= 2017 NCAA Division I Women's Swimming and Diving Championships =

American college aquatic sports competition

- Host city: Indianapolis, Indiana
- Date: March 16–18, 2017
- Venue(s): Indiana University Natatorium; Indiana University – Purdue University Indianapolis

The 2017 NCAA Division I Women's Swimming and Diving Championships were contested March 16–18, 2017 at the 36th annual NCAA-sanctioned swim meet to determine the team and individual national champions of Division I women's collegiate swimming and diving in the United States.

This year's events were hosted by Indiana University – Purdue University Indianapolis at the Indiana University Natatorium in Indianapolis, Indiana.

Stanford had a dominating performance to win their first NCAA title since 1998, and their ninth overall (the most of any college swim team). They finished 160.5 points ahead of the second place performer, California.

Kathleen Baker of California was awarded the 2017 CSCAA (College Swimming Coaches Association of America) Swimmer of the Year with her wins in the 100 and 200 backstrokes, as well as an upset over favorite Ella Eastin in the 200 individual medley. She was also a part of four of Cal's relays, contributing the fastest backstroke legs on both of Cal's medley relays. She also led off the 800 free relay to a 2nd-place finish, and was a part of Cal's 3rd place 400 free relay. Her leadoff in the 400 medley relay of 49.80 was an NCAA meet record, however, the relay was disqualified.

Meanwhile, Greg Meehan of Stanford was awarded the 2017 CSCAA Division 1 Women's Coach of the Year. He led the Cardinal to a spectacular win, including individual wins from Simone Manuel, Katie Ledecky, and Ella Eastin.

== Team standings ==
- Note: Top 10 only
- (H) = Hosts
- ^{(DC)} = Defending champions
- Italics = Debut finish in the Top 10
- Full results

Rank	Team	Points
1st place, gold medalist(s)	Stanford	526.5
2nd place, silver medalist(s)	California	366
3rd place, bronze medalist(s)	Texas A&M	292.5
4	Georgia ^{(DC)}	252.5
5	Texas	252
6	Louisville	194.5
7	NC State	194
8	Indiana (H)	185
9	USC	176
10	Minnesota	168

== Swimming Results ==
Event	Gold		Silver		Bronze	
50 freestyle	Simone Manuel; Stanford	21.17; NC	Olivia Smoliga; Georgia	21.27	Liz Li; Ohio State	21.29
100 freestyle	Simone Manuel; Stanford	45.56; US, AR	Olivia Smoliga; Georgia	46.30	Mallory Comerford; Louisville	46.35
200 freestyle	Katie Ledecky; Stanford Mallory Comerford; Louisville	1:40.36	None awarded		Simone Manuel; Stanford	1:40.70
500 freestyle	Katie Ledecky; Stanford	4:24.06; US, AR	Leah Smith; Virginia	4:28.90	Kennedy Goss; Indiana	4:36.13
1650 freestyle	Katie Ledecky; Stanford	15:07.70; MR	Leah Smith; Virginia	15:28.89	Megan Byrnes; Stanford	15:50.87
100 backstroke	Kathleen Baker; California	49.84	Olivia Smoliga; Georgia	50.04	Hannah Stevens; Missouri	50.57
200 backstroke	Kathleen Baker; California	1:48.44	Alexia Zevnik; NC State	1:49.09	Asia Seidt; Kentucky	1:49.63
100 breaststroke	Lilly King; Indiana	56.71; MR	Lindsey Horejsi; Minnesota	58.03	Laura Simon; Virginia	58.20
200 breaststroke	Lilly King; Indiana	2:03.18; US, AR	Kierra Smith; Minnesota	2:03.55	Emily Escobedo; UMBC	2:05.20
100 butterfly	Farida Osman; California	50.05	Hellen Moffitt; UNC	50.37	Louise Hansson; USC	50.45
200 butterfly	Ella Eastin; Stanford	1:51.35	Katie McLaughlin; California	1:52.37	Jen Marrkand; Virginia	1:53.15
200 IM	Kathleen Baker; California	1:51.69	Ella Eastin; Stanford	1:52.27	Madisyn Cox; Texas	1:52.58
400 IM	Ella Eastin; Stanford	3:57.57; AR	Sydney Pickrem; Texas A&M	3:59.46	Madisyn Cox; Texas	4:00.97
200 freestyle relay	California; Abbey Weitzeil (21.59); Maddie Murphy (21.83); Amy Bilquist (21.26); Farida Osman (20.91)	1:25.59; US	Stanford; Simone Manuel (21.47); Lia Neal (21.35); Janet Hu (21.80); Ally Howe (21.29)	1:25.91	Georgia; Olivia Smoliga (21.32); Veronica Burchill (21.74); Emily Cameron (22.19); Chantal Van Landeghem (21.24)	1:26.49
400 freestyle relay	Stanford; Simone Manuel (46.02); Katie Ledecky (47.59); Janet Hu (47.63); Lia Neal (46.37)	3:07.61; US, AR	Georgia; Olivia Smoliga (46.70); Veronica Burchill (47.42); Meaghan Raab (48.12); Chantal Van Landeghem (46.73)	3:08.97	California; Amy Bilquist (47.55); Kathleen Baker (47.72); Abbey Weitzeil (46.93); Farida Osman (46.88)	3:09.08
800 freestyle relay	Stanford; Simone Manuel (1:41.41); Lia Neal (1:42.15); Ella Eastin (1:41.89); Katie Ledecky (1:40.46)	6:45.91; US, AR	California; Kathleen Baker (1:42.66); Kristen Vredeveld (1:43.97); Katie McLaughlin (1:42.08); Amy Bilquist (1:42.71)	6:51.42	Michigan; Gabby Deloof (1:43.27); Rose Bi (1:43.97); Siobhán Haughey (1:41.81); G Ryan (1:44.58)	6:53.63
200 medley relay	California; Kathleen Baker (23.62); Abbey Weitzeil (26.67); Noemie Thomas (22.70); Farida Osman (21.11)	1:34.10; US	Texas A&M; Béryl Gastaldello (23.85); Jorie Caneta (26.40); Sarah Gibson (22.43); Kristen Malone (22.17)	1:34.85	Stanford; Ally Howe (24.08); Kim Williams (27.12); Janet Hu (22.75); Simone Manuel (20.95)	1:34.90
400 medley relay	Stanford; Ally Howe (51.42); Kim Williams (58.51); Janet Hu (50.27); Lia Neal (46.15)	3:26.35	Texas A&M; Lisa Bratton (51.60); Jorie Caneta (58.60); Sarah Gibson (50.28); Béryl Gastaldello (47.12)	3:27.60	Texas; Tasija Karosas (50.83); Madisyn Cox (58.30); Lauren Case (51.72); Rebecca Millard (46.89)	3:27.74

Legend: US – U.S. Open record; NC – NCAA record; MR – Meet record; AR – American record;

== Diving Results ==
Event	Gold		Silver		Bronze	
1 m diving	Alison Gibson; Texas	332.60	Sarah Bacon; Minnesota	326.50	Maria Polyakova; UCLA	325.80
3 m diving	Yu Zhou; Minnesota	392.75	Pei Lin; Miami (OH)	383.50	Kassidy Cook; Stanford	372.30
Platform diving	Olivia Rosendahl; Northwestern	335.30	Jessica Parrato; Indiana	314.45	Rebecca Quesnel; Florida International	302.35

== See also ==
- List of college swimming and diving teams
