= Ella Eastin =

American swimmer (born 1997)

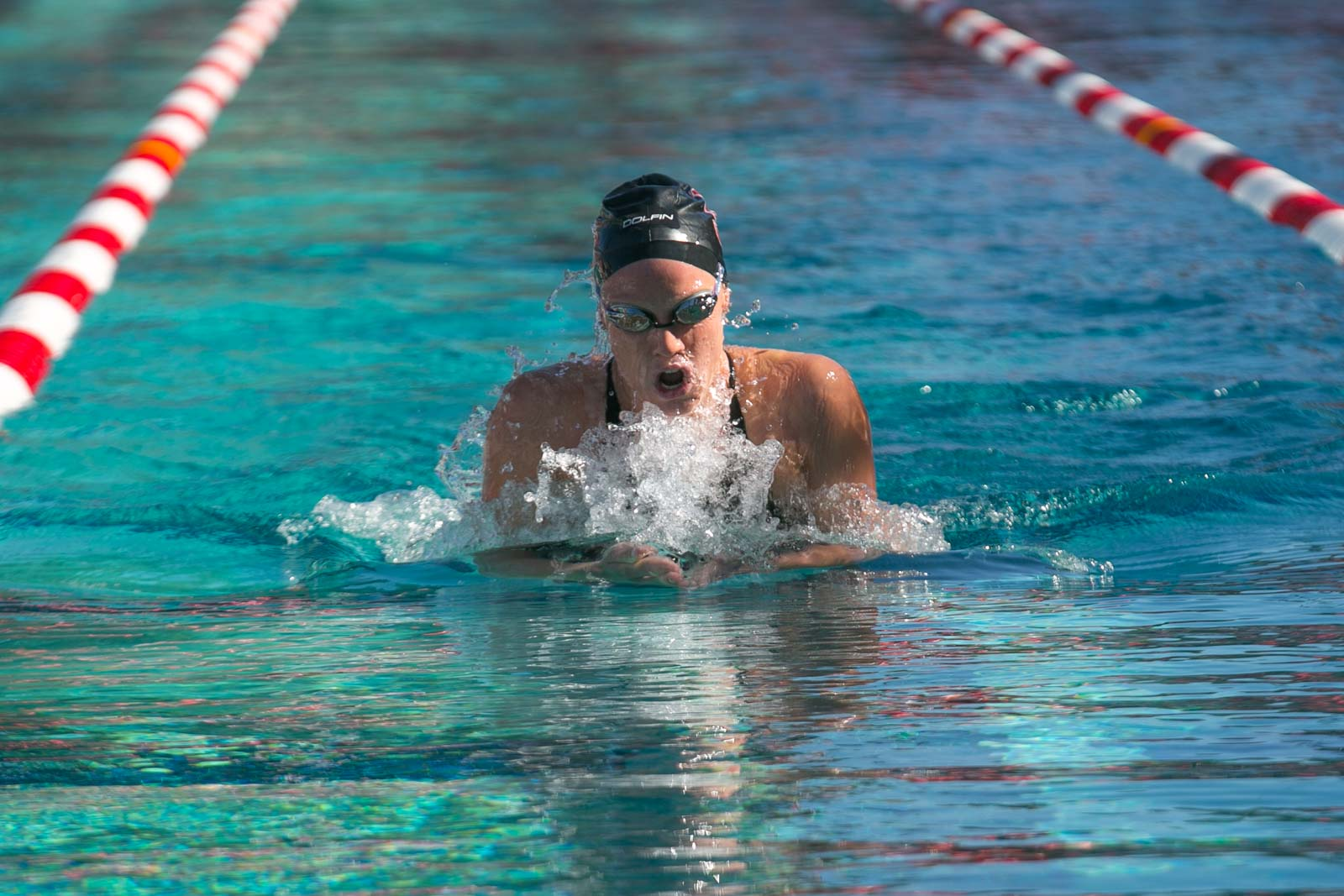
- Eastin in 2018

Personal information
- National team: United States
- Born: March 28, 1997 (age 29) Irvine, California, U.S.
- Home town: Irvine, California
- Height: 5 ft 9 in (175.3 cm)

Sport
- Sport: Swimming
- Retired: 2021
- Strokes: Individual medley, Butterfly
- Club: SOCAL Aquatics
- College team: Stanford University
- Coach: Greg Meehan
Medal record
Women's swimming
Representing the United States
Event	1st	2nd	3rd
World Championships (SC)	0	2	0
World University Games	1	3	0
Total	1	5	0
World Championships (SC)
Silver medal – second place	2016 Windsor	200 m medley
Silver medal – second place	2016 Windsor	400 m medley
World University Games
Gold medal – first place	2017 Taipei	200 m butterfly
Silver medal – second place	2017 Taipei	200 m medley
Silver medal – second place	2017 Taipei	4×200 m freestyle
Silver medal – second place	2019 Naples	200 m medley
Junior Pan Pacific Championships
Gold medal – first place	2014 Maui	200 m medley
Gold medal – first place	2014 Maui	400 m medley
Representing the Stanford Cardinal
Event	1st	2nd	3rd
NCAA Championships	12	4	1
Total	12	4	1
By race
Event	1st	2nd	3rd
200 y butterfly	2	2	0
200 y medley	2	2	0
400 y medley	4	0	0
4×100 y freestyle	1	0	1
4×200 y freestyle	3	0	0
Total	12	4	1
NCAA Championships
Gold medal – first place	2016 Atlanta	200 y medley
Gold medal – first place	2016 Atlanta	400 y medley
Gold medal – first place	2017 Indianapolis	200 y butterfly
Gold medal – first place	2017 Indianapolis	400 y medley
Gold medal – first place	2017 Indianapolis	4×200 y freestyle
Gold medal – first place	2018 Columbus	200 y butterfly
Gold medal – first place	2018 Columbus	200 y medley
Gold medal – first place	2018 Columbus	400 y medley
Gold medal – first place	2018 Columbus	4×100 y freestyle
Gold medal – first place	2018 Columbus	4×200 y freestyle
Gold medal – first place	2019 Austin	400 y medley
Gold medal – first place	2019 Austin	4×200 y freestyle
Silver medal – second place	2016 Atlanta	200 y butterfly
Silver medal – second place	2017 Indianapolis	200 y medley
Silver medal – second place	2019 Austin	200 y butterfly
Silver medal – second place	2019 Austin	200 y medley
Bronze medal – third place	2019 Austin	4×100 y freestyle

Ella Eastin (born March 28, 1997). She is an American medley specialist in Orange County California. She is now a retired swimmer specializing in the individual medley and butterfly events.

== Personal life ==
At 6 years old, Eastin and her little sister were trained by coach Todd Larsen. Eastin claims that he was her main inspiration for swimming. When Eastin was 12 years old, Larson was diagnosed with leukemia. He died 13 months later at the age of 44 due to complications from a bone marrow transplant.

Ella's grandparents were also very talented athletes as her grandfather got drafted to play baseball and her grandmother golfed professionally.

== Swimming career ==
=== College career ===
Eastin swam for the Stanford Cardinal, and is a twelve-time NCAA champion.

During her freshman season, she set an American record in the 200-yard individual medley. At the 2016 NCAA Championships, she won the 200-yard and 400-yard individual medleys, and placed second behind Kelsi Worrell in the 200-yard butterfly. Ella set a record with her 400-yard medley for the quickest swim time for any NCAA freshman.

During the first day of the 2017 NCAA Championships, Eastin, along with her teammates Simone Manuel, Lia Neal, and Katie Ledecky, set a record of 6:45.91 in the 800-yard freestyle relay. She lost the 200-yard individual medley to Kathleen Baker, but successfully defended her 400-yard individual medley title by breaking teammate Katie Ledecky's American record. She also added a win in the 200-yard butterfly.

In the 2018 NCAA Championships, Eastin set new NCAA and American records in the 200-yard individual medley with a time of 1:50.67, and she shattered Katie Ledecky's American record in the 400-yard individual medley by almost two seconds, with a time of 3:54.60. She also won the 200-yard butterfly, and she was a member of the winning relay teams in the 400-yard and 800-yard relays. Eastin was named Swimmer of the Meet.

In the 2019 NCAA Championships, Eastin won the 400-yard individual medley, and in so doing became the only woman to win four consecutive national titles in the event. She finished second in the 200-yard individual medley and in the 200-yard butterfly. She and her teammates Grace Zhao, Amalie Fackenthal, and Anya Goeders won the 200-yard medley relay. She and her teammates Katie Drabot, Taylor Ruck, and Brooke Forde took silver in the 800-yard freestyle relay.

=== International career ===
==== 2016 ====
She won silver in the women's 400 metre individual medley at the 2016 FINA World Swimming Championships (25 m). She had originally finished 3rd, but was elevated to silver, along with teammate Madisyn Cox being elevated to bronze, when Anh Vien Nguyen was disqualified from second place.

==== 2017 ====
During the 2017 Phillips 66 National Championships, Eastin grabbed second place behind Leah Smith in the 400 metre individual medley, technically qualifying her for the 2017 World Aquatics Championships in Budapest, but was disqualified for the Lochte rule.

She was named a team captain for the 2017 World University Games in Taipei.

She announced her retirement from competitive swimming in 2021 due to a diagnosis of dysautonomia, which she has linked to possible Long COVID complications. A Stanford Report article from 2026 describes her conditions as Myalgic Encephalomyelitis/Chronic Fatigue Syndrome (ME/CFS) and Postural Orthostatic Tachycardia Syndrome (POTS). Eastin could return to swimming if her condition continues to improve.

=== Current career ===
Ella Eastin founded Dysunderstood Inc., a non-profit campaign that raises awareness and educates people on complex and infection associated chronic conditions. The platform offers community, education, media awareness, and patient empowerment. Dysunderstood also hosts community events and has a podcast to further educate and empower the community. She was awarded a postgraduate scholarship of 10,000 dollars from Stanford University to continue her studies in May of 2021. As of March 17, 2026, Eastin was in the process of finishing her fourth year at Stanford's medical school, and she planned to go into pediatrics.
