= 2018 NCAA Division I Women's Swimming and Diving Championships =

American college aquatic sports competition

- Host city: Columbus, Ohio
- Date: March 14–17, 2018
- Venue(s): McCorkle Aquatic Pavilion; Ohio State University

The 2018 NCAA Division I Women's Swimming and Diving Championships were contested March 14–17, 2018 at the 37th annual NCAA-sanctioned swim meet to determine the team and individual national champions of Division I women's collegiate swimming and diving in the United States.

This year's events were hosted by Ohio State University at the McCorkle Aquatic Pavilion in Columbus, Ohio.

Stanford went back-to-back in national titles for the first time since 1996, and their tenth overall title. They finished 220 points ahead of California. The Cardinal scored in every single event except for the 1 meter diving and the platform diving. Stanford also became the third team to sweep all five relays at an NCAA Championship.

Ella Eastin of Stanford was awarded the 2018 CSCAA Swimmer of the Year with her victories in the 200 IM, 400 IM, and 200 butterfly. Her wins in the 200 IM and 400 IM were both American records. She was also a part of two winning relays, the 800 free relay (along with Katie Ledecky, Katie Drabot, and Brooke Forde), and the 400 free relay (along with Drabot, Simone Manuel, and Janet Hu).

Stanford's Greg Meehan was awarded the 2018 CSCAA Division 1 Women's Coach of the Year for the second year, coaching Simone Manuel, Ella Eastin, Katie Ledecky, and Ally Howe to individual wins.

== Team standings ==
- Note: Top 10 only
- (H) = Hosts
- ^{(DC)} = Defending champions
- Italics = Debut finish in the Top 10
- Full results

Rank	Team	Points
1st place, gold medalist(s)	Stanford ^{(DC)}	593
2nd place, silver medalist(s)	California	373
3rd place, bronze medalist(s)	Texas A&M	299
4	Michigan	267
5	Louisville	232
6	Texas	221.5
7	Tennessee	194
8	Indiana	169
9	Virginia	161
10	Minnesota	157

== Swimming Results ==
Event	Gold		Silver		Bronze	
50 freestyle	Simone Manuel; Stanford	21.18	Erika Brown; Tennessee	21.51	Liz Li; Ohio State	21.59
100 freestyle	Simone Manuel; Stanford	45.65	Mallory Comerford; Louisville	46.20	Abbey Weitzeil; California	46.74
200 freestyle	Mallory Comerford; Louisville	1:39.80	Siobhán Haughey; Michigan	1:40.69	Simone Manuel; Stanford	1:41.48
500 freestyle	Katie Ledecky; Stanford	4:26.57	Katie Drabot; Stanford	4:34.86	Kirsten Jacobsen; Arizona	4:35.04
1650 freestyle	Katie Ledecky; Stanford	15:07.57; MR	Ally McHugh; Penn State	15:36.27	Hannah Moore; NC State	15:40.68
100 backstroke	Ally Howe; Stanford	49.69; MR	Beata Nelson; Wisconsin	49.92	Kathleen Baker; California	50.18
200 backstroke	Kathleen Baker; California	1:47.30; US, AR	Asia Seidt; Kentucky	1:49.24	Beata Nelson; Wisconsin	1:49.27
100 breaststroke	Lilly King; Indiana	56.25; US, AR	Miranda Tucker; Michigan	57.98	Lindsey Kozelsky; Minnesota	58.18
200 breaststroke	Lilly King; Indiana	2:02.60; US, AR	Bethany Galat; Texas A&M	2:03.26	Sydney Pickrem; Texas A&M	2:05.76
100 butterfly	Louise Hansson; USC	49.80	Erika Brown; Tennessee	50.34	Janet Hu; Stanford	50.56
200 butterfly	Ella Eastin; Stanford	1:50.01; MR	Katie Drabot; Stanford	1:51.73	Louise Hansson; USC	1:52.64
200 IM	Ella Eastin; Stanford	1:50.67; US, AR	Kathleen Baker; California	1:51.25	Sydney Pickrem; Texas A&M	1:52.35
400 IM	Ella Eastin; Stanford	3:54.60; US, AR	Katie Ledecky; Stanford	3:58.29	Sydney Pickrem; Texas A&M	3:59.05
200 freestyle relay	Stanford; Janet Hu (21.65); Simone Manuel (20.89); Lauren Pitzer (21.62); Ally Howe (21.27)	1:25.43; US, AR	California; Maddie Murphy (21.64); Amy Bilquist (21.08); Katie McLaughlin (21.47); Abbey Weitzeil (21.01)	1:25.50	Tennessee; Erika Brown (21.61); Maddy Banic (21.86); Stanzi Moseley (21.74); Bailey Grinter (21.89)	1:27.10
400 freestyle relay	Stanford; Janet Hu (47.49); Ella Eastin (47.13); Katie Drabot (47.85); Simone Manuel (45.47)	3:07.94	California; Amy Bilquist (47.59); Abbey Weitzeil (46.37); Kathleen Baker (47.21); Katie McLaughlin (46.88)	3:08.05	Virginia; Morgan Hill (48.23); Laine Reed (47.40); Kyla Valls (47.47); Caitlin Cooper (47.40)	3:10.50
800 freestyle relay	Stanford; Katie Drabot (1:42.99); Ella Eastin (1:41.13); Brooke Forde (1:42.94); Katie Ledecky (1:39.87)	6:46.93	Michigan; Catie Deloof (1:43.35); Siobhán Haughey (1:40.49); Rose Bi (1:43.88); Gabby Deloof (1:42.31)	6:50.03	California; Robin Neumann (1:43.78); Kathleen Baker (1:42.78); Katie McLaughlin (1:41.64); Amy Bilquist (1:42.63)	6:51.42
200 medley relay	Stanford; Ally Howe (23.54); Kim Williams (26.50); Janet Hu (22.62); Simone Manuel (20.45)	1:33.11; US, AR	California; Kathleen Baker (23.56); Abbey Weitzeil (26.68); Noemie Thomas (22.66); Amy Bilquist (20.95)	1:33.85	Indiana; Ally Rockett (23.54); Lilly King (25.38); Christine Jensen (22.66); Grace Haskett (21.79)	1:33.89
400 medley relay	Stanford; Ally Howe (50.34); Kim Williams (58.59); Janet Hu (50.36); Simone Manuel (45.80)	3:25.09; US, AR	Indiana; Ally Rockett (51.31); Lilly King (56.02); Christine Jensen (51.13); Kennedy Goss (47.63)	3:26.09	California; Kathleen Baker (50.66); Ali Harrison (58.89); Noemie Thomas (50.25); Abbey Weitzeil (47.06)	3:26.86

Legend: US – U.S. Open record; MR – Meet record; AR – American record;

== Diving Results ==
Event	Gold		Silver		Bronze	
1 m diving	Sarah Bacon; Minnesota	343.50	Julia Vincent; South Carolina	333.50	Sharae Zheng; Nevada	325.25
3 m diving	Brooke Schultz; Arkansas	399.45	Sharae Zheng; Nevada	394.95	Julia Vincent; South Carolina	361.75
Platform diving	Olivia Rosendahl; Northwestern	346.15	Murphy Bromberg; Texas	335.30	Eloise Belanger; UCLA	300.65

== See also ==
- List of college swimming and diving teams
