= 2016 NCAA Division I Women's Swimming and Diving Championships =

American college aquatic sports competition

- Host city: (Georgia (U.S. state)) Atlanta
- Date: March 16–19, 2016
- Venue(s): McAuley Aquatic Center; Georgia Institute of Technology
- Athletes: 322

The 2016 NCAA Division I Women's Swimming and Diving Championships were contested March 16–19, 2016 at the 35th annual NCAA-sanctioned swim meet to determine the team and individual national champions of Division I women's collegiate swimming and diving in the United States.

This year's events were hosted by the Georgia Institute of Technology at the McAuley Aquatic Center in Atlanta.

Georgia once again returned to the top of the team standings, finishing 19 points (414–395) ahead of Stanford. This was the Lady Bulldogs' seventh team title.

Lilly King of Indiana was awarded the 2016 CSCAA (College Swimming Coaches Association of America) Swimmer of the Year. King won the 100 and 200 breaststrokes in record breaking fashion, and was the first woman under 57 seconds in the 100 breast, and the first woman to go under the 2:04 barrier in the 200 breaststroke. She helped the Hoosiers in the medley relay with splits of 56.74 and 26.05 to help Indiana to a 7th-place finish; the former was, as of 2016, the fastest relay split in history.

Georgia's Jack Bauerle was awarded the 2016 CSCAA Division 1 Women's Coach of the Year after leading the Lady Dawgs to a win over the favored Stanford Cardinal, and helped Olivia Smoliga and Brittany MacLean win individual titles.

== Team standings ==
- Note: Top 10 only
- ^{(DC)} = Defending champions
- Italics = Debut finish in the Top 10
- Full results

| Rank | Team | Points |
|---|---|---|
| 1st place, gold medalist(s) | Georgia | 414 |
| 2nd place, silver medalist(s) | Stanford | 395 |
| 3rd place, bronze medalist(s) | California ^{(DC)} | 358 |
| 4 | Texas A&M | 309 |
| 5 | Virginia | 264 |
| 6 | USC | 244.5 |
| 7 | Indiana | 228 |
| 8 | Louisville | 220 |
| 9 | NC State | 155 |
| 10 | Michigan | 150 |

== Swimming results ==
| Event | Gold | | Silver | | Bronze | |
|---|---|---|---|---|---|---|
| 50 freestyle | Olivia Smoliga; Georgia | 21.21; NC | Farida Osman; California | 21.46 | Liz Li; Ohio State | 21.48 |
| 100 freestyle | Olivia Smoliga; Georgia | 46.70 | Lia Neal; Stanford | 47.00 | Kasia Wilk; USC | 47.35 |
| 200 freestyle | Brittany MacLean; Georgia | 1:42.42 | Mallory Comerford; Louisville | 1:42.54 | Lia Neal; Stanford | 1:42.58 |
| 500 freestyle | Leah Smith; Virginia | 4:31.33 | Brittany MacLean; Georgia | 4:33.05 | Hali Flickinger; Georgia | 4:33.35 |
| 1650 freestyle | Leah Smith; Virginia | 15:32.72 | Brittany MacLean; Georgia | 15:39.29 | Rose Bi; Michigan | 15:45.26 |
| 100 backstroke | Rachel Bootsma; California | 50.28 | Courtney Bartholomew; Virginia | 50.73 | Ally Howe; Stanford | 50.86 |
| 200 backstroke | Danielle Galyer; Kentucky | 1:49.71 | Courtney Bartholomew; Virginia | 1:50.29 | Kennedy Goss; Indiana | 1:50.37 |
| 100 breaststroke | Lilly King; Indiana | 56.85; US, AR | Sarah Haase; Stanford | 57.36 | Miranda Tucker; Indiana | 58.10 |
| 200 breaststroke | Lilly King; Indiana | 2:03.59; US, AR | Miranda Tucker; Indiana | 2:06.27 | Emily Escobedo; UMBC | 2:06.43 |
| 100 butterfly | Kelsi Worrell; Louisville | 49.43; US, AR | Sarah Gibson; Texas A&M | 50.61 | Farida Osman; California | 50.76 |
| 200 butterfly | Kelsi Worrell; Louisville | 1:50.96 | Ella Eastin; Stanford | 1:51.04 | Megan Kingsley; Georgia | 1:53.10 |
| 200 IM | Ella Eastin; Stanford | 1:51.65; US, AR | Kathleen Baker; California | 1:52.95 | Kirsten Vose; USC | 1:54.27 |
| 400 IM | Ella Eastin; Stanford | 3:58.40 | Lindsey Clary; Ohio State | 4:03.61 | Emily Cameron; Georgia | 4:03.66 |
| 200 freestyle relay | California; Farida Osman (21.60); Kristen Vredeveld (21.71); Valerie Hull (21.85); Amy Bilquist (21.64) | 1:26.80 | Tennessee; Faith Johnson (22.13); Harper Bruens (21.48); Maddy Banic (21.67); Kira Toussaint (22.14) | 1:27.42 | Georgia; Olivia Smoliga (21.46); Kylie Stewart (22.16); Meaghan Raab (22.08); Emily Cameron (21.83) | 1:27.53 |
| 400 freestyle relay | USC; Kasia Wilk (47.60); Kristen Vose (47.45); Chelsea Chenault (47.85); Anika Apostalon (46.77) | 3:09.69 | Georgia; Olivia Smoliga (46.87); Brittany MacLean (47.64); Meaghan Raab (48.00); Hali Flickinger (48.31) | 3:10.82 | Texas A&M; Béryl Gastaldello (47.19); Kristen Malone (48.24); Claire Rasmus (48.77); Sarah Gibson (47.71) | 3:11.91 |
| 800 freestyle relay | Georgia; Hali Flickinger (1:42.80); Kylie Stewart (1:43.95); Meaghan Raab (1:43.59); Brittany MacLean (1:41.46) | 6:51.80 | USC; Kristen Vose (1:43.08); Anika Apostalon (1:44.34); Chelsea Chenault (1:42.69); Kasia Wilk (1:43.73) | 6:53.84 | California; Kathleen Baker (1:43.99); Elizabeth Pelton (1:44.07); Rachel Bootsma (1:44.23); Amy Bilquist (1:42.89) | 6:55.18 |
| 200 medley relay | Stanford; Ally Howe (24.16); Sarah Haase (26.38); Janet Hu (22.79); Lia Neal (21.48) | 1:34.81 | California; Rachel Bootsma (23.36); Marina García Urzainqui (27.95); Noemie Thomas (22.68); Farida Osman (21.12) | 1:35.11 | Louisville; Alina Kendzior (24.47); Andrea Cottrell (26.65); Kelsi Worrell (22.55); Mallory Comerford (21.69) | 1:35.36 |
| 400 medley relay | Stanford; Ally Howe (51.89); Sarah Haase (57.02); Janet Hu (50.65); Lia Neal (46.58) | 3:26.14; US, AR | Louisville; Alina Kendzior (52.71); Andrea Cottrell (58.23); Kelsi Worrell (49.31); Mallory Comerford (47.33) | 3:27.58 | Virginia; Courtney Bartholomew (50.95); Laura Simon (58.30); Kaitlyn Jones (52.34); Ellen Thomas (47.15) | 3:28.22 |

Legend: US – U.S. Open record; NC – NCAA record; AR – American record;

== Diving Results ==
| Event | Gold | | Silver | | Bronze | |
|---|---|---|---|---|---|---|
| 1 m diving | Sharae Zheng; Nevada | 344.95 | Eloise Belanger; UCLA | 336.00 | Pei Lin; Miami (OH) | 332.20 |
| 3 m diving | Sharae Zheng; Nevada | 404.70 | Pei Lin; Miami (OH) | 399.40 | Kahlia Warner; Florida | 387.20 |
| Platform diving | Gracia Leydon-Mahoney; Stanford | 346.15 | Yu Zhou; Minnesota | 331.80 | Mara Aiacoboae; Arizona State | 289.10 |

== See also ==
- List of college swimming and diving teams
