= 2019 NCAA Division I Women's Swimming and Diving Championships =

American college aquatic sports competition

- Host city: Austin, Texas
- Date: March 20–23, 2019
- Venue(s): Lee and Joe Jamail Texas Swimming Center; University of Texas at Austin

The 2019 NCAA Division I Women's Swimming and Diving Championships were contested from March 20–23, 2019 at the Lee and Joe Jamail Texas Swimming Center at University of Texas at Austin in Austin, Texas at the 38th annual NCAA-sanctioned swim meet to determine the team and individual national champions of Division I women's collegiate swimming and diving in the United States.

== Team standings ==
- Note: Top 10 only
- (H) = Hosts
- ^{(DC)} = Defending champions
- Full results

Rank	Team	Points
1st place, gold medalist(s)	Stanford ^{(DC)}	456.5
2nd place, silver medalist(s)	California	419
3rd place, bronze medalist(s)	Michigan	314
4	Louisville	235
5	Texas (H)	190.5
6	Virginia	188
7	NC State	187.5
8	Tennessee	185
9	Indiana	179
10	USC	159

== Swimming Results ==
Event	Gold		Silver		Bronze	
50 freestyle	Abbey Weitzeil; California	21.02; US, AR	Erika Brown; Tennessee	21.23	Mallory Comerford; Louisville	21.49
100 freestyle	Mallory Comerford; Louisville	46.20	Anna Hopkin; Arkansas	46.56	Siobhán Haughey; Michigan	46.64
200 freestyle	Mallory Comerford; Louisville	1:40.26	Taylor Ruck; Stanford	1:40.37	Siobhán Haughey; Michigan	1:40.70
500 freestyle	Brooke Forde; Stanford	4:31.34	Paige Madden; Virginia	4:32.98	Mackenzie Padington; Minnesota	4:35.21
1650 freestyle	Ally McHugh; Penn State	15:39.22	Molly Kowal; Ohio State	15:44.61	Mackenzie Padington; Minnesota	15:47.16
100 backstroke	Beata Nelson; Wisconsin	49.18; US, AR	Amy Bilquist; California	50.05	Taylor Ruck; Stanford	50.34
200 backstroke	Beata Nelson; Wisconsin	1:47.24; NC	Taylor Ruck; Stanford	1:47.59	Asia Seidt; Kentucky	1:48.65
100 breaststroke	Lilly King; Indiana	55.73; US, AR	Delaney Duncan; Eastern Michigan	57.83	Sophie Hansson; NC State	57.90
200 breaststroke	Lilly King; Indiana	2:02.90	Sydney Pickrem; Texas A&M	2:03.65	Sophie Hansson; NC State	2:06.18
100 butterfly	Louise Hansson; USC	49.26; US	Maggie MacNeil; Michigan	49.66	Katie McLaughlin; California	49.97
200 butterfly	Louise Hansson; USC	1:50.28	Ella Eastin; Stanford	1:50.46	Grace Oglesby; Louisville	1:50.80
200 IM	Beata Nelson; Wisconsin	1:50.79	Ella Eastin; Stanford	1:51.81	Sydney Pickrem; Texas A&M	1:51.84
400 IM	Ella Eastin; Stanford	3:57.03	Sydney Pickrem; Texas A&M	3:58.23	Brooke Forde; Stanford	3:59.26
200 freestyle relay	California; Maddie Murphy (21.82); Katie McLaughlin (21.37); Amy Bilquist (20.87); Abbey Weitzeil (20.49)	1:24.55; US, AR	Michigan; Maggie MacNeil (21.57); Catie DeLoof (21.59); Siobhán Haughey (21.44); Daria Pyshnenko (21.65)	1:26.25	Stanford; Taylor Ruck (21.73); Lauren Pitzer (21.66); Amalie Fackenthal (21.45); Anya Goeders (21.66)	1:26.50
400 freestyle relay	California; Isabel Ivey (47.79); Katie McLaughlin (46.62); Amy Bilquist (46.48); Abbey Weitzeil (46.07)	3:06.96; US, AR	Michigan; Maggie MacNeil (47.04); Siobhán Haughey (46.44); Catie DeLoof (46.91); Daria Pyshnenko (47.68)	3:08.07	Stanford; Lauren Pitzer (48.29); Ella Eastin (47.54); Amalie Fackenthal (48.25); Taylor Ruck (45.65)	3:09.73
800 freestyle relay	Stanford; Katie Drabot (1:43.99); Ella Eastin (1:41.03); Taylor Ruck (1:39.83); Brooke Forde (1:42.37)	6:47.22	California; Robin Neumann (1:42.94); Isabel Ivey (1:43.78); Katie McLaughlin (1:41.64); Amy Bilquist (1:42.33)	6:50.12	USC; Louise Hansson (1:41.93); Laticia Transom (1:43.61); Tatum Wade (1:43.00); Kirsten Vose (1:43.57)	6:52.13
200 medley relay	Tennessee; Meghan Small (24.03); Nikol Popov (26.51); Maddy Banic (22.58); Erika Brown (20.98)	1:34.10	California; Isabel Ivey (24.07); Ema Rajic (27.28); Maddie Murphy (22.63); Abbey Weitzeil (20.45)	1:34.43	NC State; Elise Haan (23.90); Sophie Hansson (26.64); Kylee Alons (22.94); Ky-lee Perry (21.32)	1:34.80
400 medley relay	California; Amy Bilquist (50.84); Ema Rajic (58.53); Katie McLaughlin (50.00); Abbey Weitzeil (45.87)	3:25.24	Indiana; Morgan Scott (52.19); Lilly King (55.67); Christine Jensen (51.47); Shelby Koontz (47.63)	3:26.09	Michigan; Taylor Garcia (52.50); Miranda Tucker (58.14); Maggie MacNeil (50.34); Siobhán Haughey (46.81)	3:27.49

Legend: US – U.S. Open record; NC – NCAA record; AR – American record;

== Diving Results ==
Event	Gold		Silver		Bronze	
1 m diving	Sarah Bacon; Minnesota	363.20; MR	Maria Polyakova; UCLA	346.90	Alison Gibson; Texas	338.95
3 m diving	Maria Polyakova; UCLA	396.00	Brooke Schultz; Arkansas	399.45	Alicia Blagg; Miami	394.95
Platform diving	Murphy Bromberg; Texas	391.60	Emily Meaney; Purdue	336.15	Jessica Parratto; Indiana	332.90

Legend: MR – Meet record;

== See also ==
- List of college swimming and diving teams
