= Katie McLaughlin =

American swimmer (born 1997)

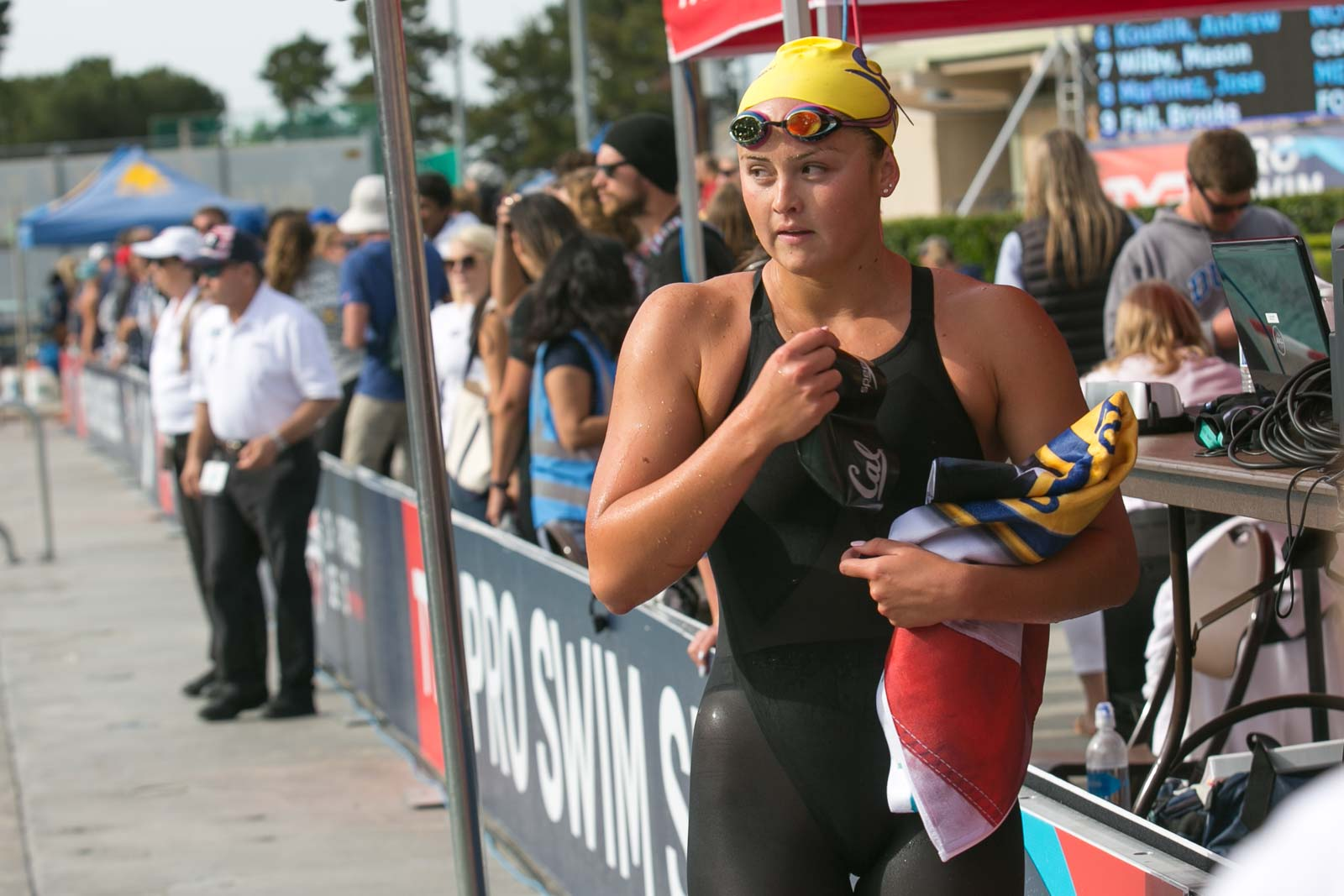
- McLaughlin in 2018

Personal information
- Full name: Kathryn McLaughlin
- National team: United States
- Born: July 9, 1997 (age 28) Dana Point, California, U.S.
- Height: 5 ft 8 in (172.7 cm)

Sport
- Sport: Swimming
- Strokes: Butterfly, freestyle
- Club: Mission Viejo Nadadores
- College team: University of California, Berkeley
Medal record
Women's swimming
Representing the United States
Olympic Games
Silver medal – second place	2020 Tokyo	4×200 m freestyle
World Championships (LC)
Gold medal – first place	2015 Kazan	4×200 m freestyle
Gold medal – first place	2019 Gwangju	4×100 m medley
Gold medal – first place	2019 Gwangju	4×100 m mixed freestyle
Silver medal – second place	2015 Kazan	4×100 m mixed medley
Silver medal – second place	2019 Gwangju	4×200 m freestyle
Pan Pacific Championships
Silver medal – second place	2018 Tokyo	4×200 m freestyle
Bronze medal – third place	2014 Gold Coast	200 m butterfly
World University Games
Silver medal – second place	2017 Taipei	4×200 m freestyle
Silver medal – second place	2017 Taipei	4×100 m medley
Bronze medal – third place	2017 Taipei	4×100 m freestyle
Representing the California Golden Bears
NCAA Championships
Gold medal – first place	2019 Austin	4×50 y freestyle
Gold medal – first place	2019 Austin	4×100 y freestyle
Gold medal – first place	2019 Austin	4×100 y medley
Silver medal – second place	2017 Indianapolis	200 y butterfly
Silver medal – second place	2017 Indianapolis	4×200 y freestyle
Silver medal – second place	2018 Columbus	4×50 y freestyle
Silver medal – second place	2018 Columbus	4×100 y freestyle
Silver medal – second place	2019 Austin	4×200 y freestyle
Bronze medal – third place	2018 Columbus	4×200 y freestyle
Bronze medal – third place	2019 Austin	100 y butterfly

Kathryn "Katie" McLaughlin (born June 9, 1997) is an American competition swimmer who specializes in butterfly and freestyle events. McLaughlin has represented the United States in international competition at the FINA world championships and the Pan Pacific Swimming Championships. She qualified for the 2020 US Olympic Swimming team in the 200m freestyle.

== Career ==
At the 2014 Pan Pacific Swimming Championships, McLaughlin won a bronze medal in the 200m butterfly. She then represented the United States at the 2015 World Aquatics Championships where she won a gold medal in the 4 × 200 m freestyle relay and a silver medal in the 4 × 100 m mixed medley relay. She also placed 6th and set a new 17-18 National Age Group Record in the 200m butterfly. In 2021, at the US Olympic Swimming Trials, she placed fourth in the 200m freestyle, earning a spot on the Olympic team.

== Tokyo 2020 Olympics ==
At the Tokyo 2020 Olympics, McLaughlin won a silver medal swimming the third leg of the Women's 4x200 meter Free Relay, with a split time of 1:55.3.
