= Diversity in swimming =

US racism in swimming

The racial composition of swimming and other aquatic sports has long been influenced by the history of segregation and violence at pools as well as the building patterns of public and private pools in America. The exclusion of people of color from public pools during the 20th century not only denied them a space for recreation and exercise but also perpetuated disparities that persist to this day. African Americans, in particular, continue to be underrepresented in swimming and aquatic sports, many facing barriers such as lack of access to swimming lessons, limited exposure to water-based activities, and lingering stereotypes of swimming as a solely "white" sport.

== Transformation of pools ==
=== Pools as bath houses ===
When swimming first became popular in America, pools were segregated by gender and class, not race. At the end of the 19th century and early 20th century, municipal pools were built in the north mainly for poor, urban, working-class Americans and used as bathing sites. Large groups of working-class men and women flocked into their gender assigned public pools and rid themselves of the dirt and grime acquired over the course of their day, while wealthier middle- and upper-class citizens used their own private baths to clean. This picture changed as a result of the redefinition of the germ theory of disease in the late 1890s. This change concluded that disease was not linked to dirtiness but rather linked to small microbes transferred by physical contact between people and the touching of shared objects or spaces. Pools, as the bathing site for many working-class Americans, were now recognized as a public health danger so cities built bath house facilities instead of pools.

=== The privatization of pools ===
After the revelation of the germ theory of disease, the influence and popularity of pools was not completely diminished but rather transformed. Pools became an arena for exercise, leisure, and sport—not cleanliness. In West Chicago Park, the Chicago Douglass Park Pool was built for the purpose of sport with a longer length suited for race competition, areas for spectators, and springboards. Initially, the facilities brought together a diverse group of poolgoers with people of all races from nearby middle and lower-class neighborhoods attending. However, soon the park board began charging an entry fee to cut down on the costs of the park, simultaneously ridding it of the boisterous lower-class boys that always seemed to cause problems. It was entry fees and intentionally choosing wealthier areas to be the host of pools that sidelined many lower-class Americans, both Black and white, from using the nice public pools.

Several strategies began being implemented by city and state officials to minimize the presence of minorities at public pools. The rise of club memberships and annual fees swept the United States around the time of the civil rights movement in an effort to exclude lower-income families from pools. Some public pools changed their hours to make it increasingly difficult for working parents to bring their children, including closing on weekends and only having open hours during the day. Other pools opted to entirely drain their pools to avoid integration.

The mid-1900s saw millions of white families leaving their homes to move into newly suburban communities, where they invested in country clubs and private recreational facilities of their own, ultimately withdrawing the taxpayer and monetary power needed to build, expand, develop, and maintain public pools. Budget constraints for public pools have led to complications such as neglect of equipment and decreased staff. This phenomenon occurred throughout the country. Between 1970 and 1980, when Cleveland's white population of the city decreased by 250,000, their recreational budget was cut by over 80%. In Mississippi, nearly 50% of all public pools had closed by 1972. Meanwhile, residential pools in the United States more than tripled between 1971 and 2000.

=== Modern-day pools ===
Over time, the number of public swimming pools in the United States decreased dramatically, reflecting the persistent legacy of racism and segregation in American society. Today, while there are more than 10 million swimming pools throughout the U.S. – approximately one pool per 30 citizens – only 309,000 are public – boiling down to just one public pool per 1,050 citizens. While the United States has more pools than most other countries, they are highly concentrated among private (and oftentimes inaccessible) spaces.

After the Great Migration, YWCA provided spaces for children of color to learn to swim. Branches of the YWCA open to people of color were often known as Phillis Wheatley branches or simply, colored branches. In the 1930s leaders of the National YWCA, under the leadership of Dorothy Guinn, researched the degree to which Black girls faced discrimination in access to swimming pools in the northern United States. Guinn's 1933 report revealed that local chapters, used a variety of tactics to exclude girls from accessing pools. A 1941 report by the YWCA subsequently found that out of 91 locations, 45 had policies that denied Black girls access to their pools. While exclusion from pools was documented, there is also evidence that some YWCA branches had swim clubs for Black girls. After a successful career as an athlete at Temple University, Inez Patterson began coaching Black girls to swim at the YWCA of Philadelphia and New York City.

The last significant monetary investment in public pools was shortly after the Great Depression under President Franklin D. Roosevelt, and since then, there has been a noticeable lack of state and federal funding. As of 2023, 96.91% of pools in the United States are private (hotels, schools, or home-owned), showcasing the difficulty of access to these facilities for the general public. Most of these private pools opened between 1950 and 1962, at around the same time as national desegregation.

Currently, the United States is undergoing a "pool shortage" – and neighborhoods of color are suffering at the forefront of this deficiency. In June 2023, Algonquin, West Louisville's only public pool, was shut down for repairs due to decades of neglected maintenance – leaving the city of over 60,000 residents without convenient access to any pool. Characterized as a predominantly black community, West Louisville especially suffers from further disparities in swimming ability and water safety. Across the United States, black and brown cities face this same story of disinvestment in public amenities and infrastructural neglect, exacerbating pre-existing disparities.

=== Gender segregation ===
From the 1890s to the 1920s, many pools were gender segregated due to the visual and physical intimacy created by the pool deck atmosphere. Swimming suits for both men and women involved minimal clothing and coverage, thus making the pool deck area visually intimate. In addition, the social and interactive aspects of swimming also made way for more physical contact, both intentional and accidental, between fellow swimmers. The issue of men and women swimming together eventually became the grounds by which many pools were segregated.

Upon desegregation in the 1950s and 1960s, the added complexity of racial tensions to these gender dynamics further acted as fuel to complicate public swimming in the United States. Black men, in particular, faced compounding barriers to swimming due to the intersection of racial and gender-based stereotypes. Societal ideas about the hyper-sexuality of black women and men have perpetuated harmful narratives surrounding their presence and integration in public swimming spaces. During this period, the rise of fashion trends that popularized more revealing feminine swimwear also fueled race-gender tensions.

These narratives made it to the legal courts, too; shortly after the decision of Brown v. Board, the NAACP initiated a local trial in Baltimore seeking to desegregate the city's municipal pools. Ultimately, the Baltimore attorney decided that despite the Supreme Court's decision to desegregate public schools, public pools were "too intimate" of a place for integration, specifically alluding to the potential dangers of white women and black men sharing sexualized spaces. Concerned with interracial intimacy, white American society upheld segregationist policies within public swimming places for much longer than the desegregation of other public facilities.

== Racial segregation of pools in America ==
=== De jure segregation ===
Local governments officially segregated pools in their cities and deployed police officers to enforce these laws.

=== De facto segregation ===
For pools that were not legally segregated, white swimmers intimidated and inflicted violence, such as drownings and beatings, on Black swimmers to enforce the divisions.

=== Transition to racial segregation ===
==== Pool intimacy ====
In the 1920s during the first pool building boom in the United States, pools began to be gender integrated in an attempt to promote family, community, and the pool as a prominent area for socialization. As gender integration was implemented, racial segregation was simultaneously adopted due to the physical and visual intimacy of swimming attire and pool decks. Pools physically intimacy, stemming from the sharing of the same water, made way for racist assumptions determining that Black Americans were dirtier and thus had more diseases that white people could contract from swimming together. Also, because of the minimal coverage of swimsuits and close proximity of pool-goers, the racist belief that Black men were "sexually aggressive" led to racial segregation of pools because white men didn't want Black men and white women to interact. The white community feared that integrated pools would allow Black men to "visually consume", touch, assault, and rape white women. The threat of sexual violence on white women was the grounds by which pools were segregated.

==== Racialized masculinity ====
Early 20th-century prevailing social expectations deemed black men as overly masculine and as a perceived threat to white masculinity, sparking concerns that the presence of African American males in public pools would undermine white male supremacy. Thus, the exclusion of African American participants from certain spaces, including access to pools, was often motivated by an underlying desire to maintain racial segregation and uphold notions of white superiority. Using their positions of power, white men in city council authorities and social authority to perpetuate sentiments of fear and reinforce racial segregation. By enacting and enforcing discriminatory policies, these individuals sought to assert and maintain white supremacy, safeguarding their perceived social dominance and privilege.

==== The Great Migration ====
The Great Migration changed the matter of cleanliness in pools from a class issue from the 1890s to the 1910s to a race issue from the 1920s to the 1930s due to the development of city slums of Black Americas.

The Great Migration was the movement of millions of Black Americans from the rural south to north, west, and midwest cities from the mid-1910s to the 1930s. A key impact of the Great Migration is the development of redlining and race restrictive housing covenants in the north to concentrate Black Americans in specific neighborhoods. Black communities dealt with restrictive housing covenants and higher rent prices which left many Black Americans with minimal options for housing. As a result, Black families were forced to subdivide their apartments and cram in extra tenants to make the inflated monthly rent payments, which left little money or time for regular maintenance of their homes. Black neighborhoods quickly became run down and overcrowded at the hands of this cycle. From a white Americans' perspective, Black migrants replaced the poor, white, European immigrants who previously inhabited the slums: the noticeably dilapidated working-class neighborhoods were now solely identified as Black communities. The worry of disease transmission in bathhouses and recreational pools was now linked to Black Americans. Pools were also unlikely to be built in or near these overcrowded black neighborhoods and entry and membership fees for other pools would have been unaffordable to Black Americans. The Great Migration shifted the societal view on cleanliness to an issue of the Black community and created deteriorated Black neighborhoods with little access to aquatic facilities.

== New Deal and swimming ==
Following the initial pool boom from 1920 to 1929, public pool construction slowed as the Great Depression began. The building and repair and renovation of pools also gave jobs to millions of unemployed Americans under the New Deal agency known as the Civil Works Administration (CWA) which later became the Works Progress Administration (WPA). In the United States, the WPA workers built 805 new swimming pools and 848 wading pools while repairing or improving 339 existing pools. The pools built and improved were described to be "examples of state-of-the-art engineering" with "massive filtration systems, heating units, and even underwater lighting" and also able to adapt to off-season recreation uses like tennis, handball, and volleyball. Pools were built in even the smallest towns and cities uniting the communities in recreation and companionship and serving as a reminder of the government's assistance during the crisis of the Great Depression. Since this major investment, pools and most other public recreational facilities have not been able to get this level of funding. So although pools built during the New Deal era served as symbols of progress, many have since fallen into rough conditions or been closed due to budget constraints and lack of proper administration. The lack of sustained investment in public pools has caused detrimental effects on marginalized communities, where access to safe and affordable recreational opportunities are extremely limited. In predominantly minority neighborhoods, the closure of public pools has left residents with little access to swimming and water-based recreation, further contributing to swimming disparities. The decline in public pool infrastructure has contributed to the privatization of swimming facilities, with many communities shifting to expensive membership-based pools or water parks for recreational swimming—widening the gap in access to swimming between high and low-income communities.

== Desegregation of pools ==
=== Legal end of segregation ===
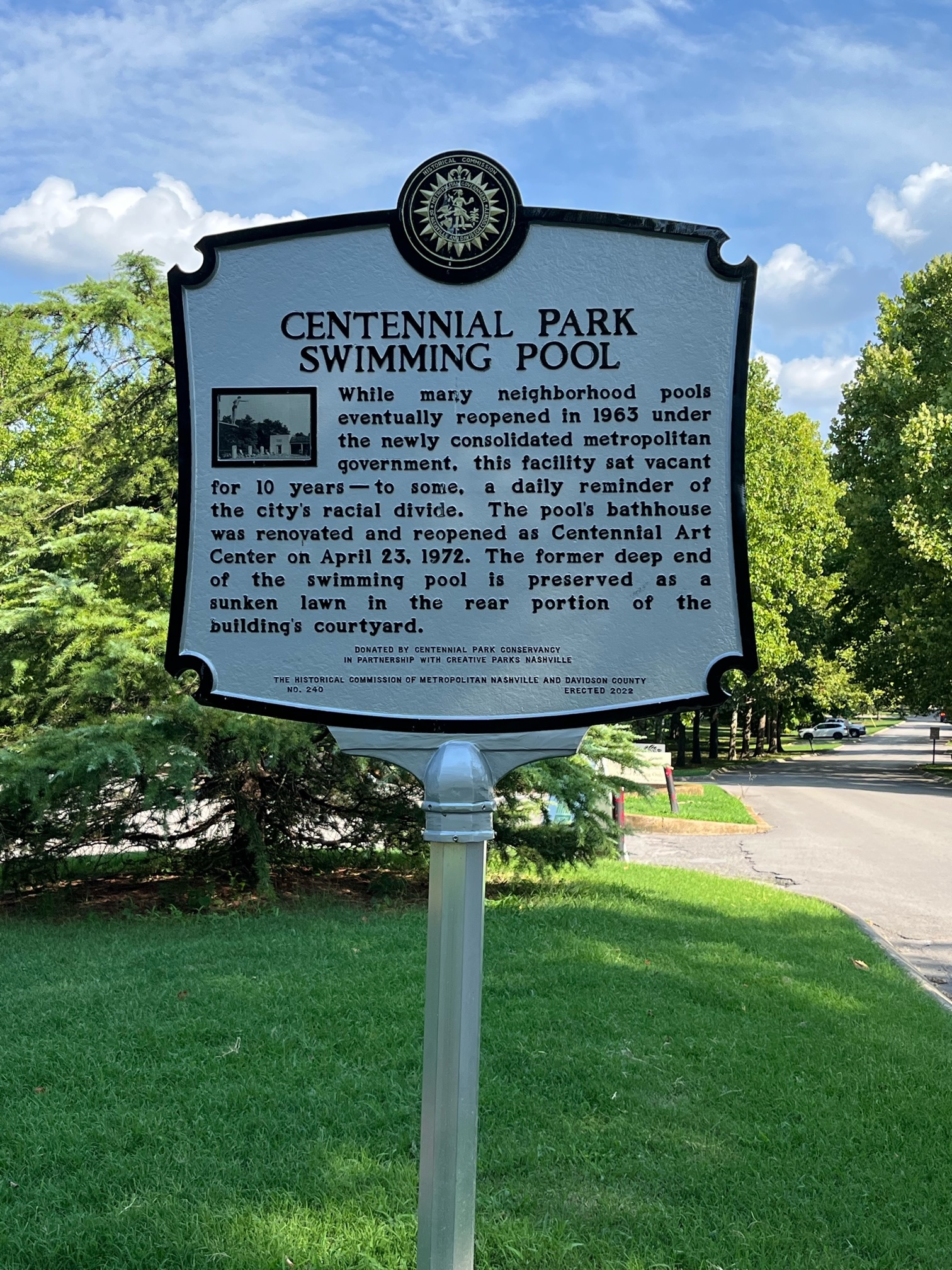
Historic marker for Centennial Park Pool in Nashville, Tennessee

In the early 1960s, African American swimmers were still banned from swimming in white owned pool in places such as Centennial Park Swimming Pool in Nashville, Tennessee. Although some cities and public pools already had begun the process of desegregation, in 1954, due to the Brown v. Board of Education decision that declared the separate but equal doctrine unconstitutional, segregation in the public sphere became illegal. Thus the division of public pools on the basis of race also became illegal because the designation of public pools based on race was inherently unequal. Later, the Civil Rights Act of 1964 further made the segregation of public facilities illegal by prohibiting discrimination on the basis of race and color.

=== White flight ===
Despite this judicial decision and government legislation, because many pools were unofficially segregated through violence and intimidation by white swimmers, the issue of access for the Black community in many ways persisted. Desegregation often brought intense racial conflict at pools so sometimes Blacks were not admitted on the grounds that their use would cause "disorder" among pool goers. In addition, instead of participating in integrated swimming, whites fled in mass numbers to the newly developed suburbs home to their private home pools and extensive aquatic facilities provided by their expensive, member-only country clubs. For example, the average number of daily white swimmers at a pool in Druid Park, Baltimore plummeted from 775 swimmers in 1955 to just six swimmers in 1956 post desegregation. This retreat marked a new private pool building boom that took place during the 1950s and 1960s which was almost exclusively accessible to whites. The boom included the construction of thousands of house pools and private swim clubs in suburban America. During the mass construction of private pools, the Federal Housing Administration openly discouraged the building of public pools, which were most accessible to Black and lower-class Americans, but encouraged private pools, which were solely available to wealthy whites living in the suburbs.

Private club memberships and home pools were exclusively available to wealthy, mainly white, Americans and their departure of the cities left the state of public pools uncertain. Without white Americans flocking to the pools for exercise and on hot summer days, there was no longer an urgent need for public pools. Cities closed and defunded pools altogether leaving almost no pools for the millions of Blacks concentrated in American cities.

==== Palmer v. Thompson ====
The Supreme Court case Palmer v. Thompson addressed the issue of shutting down public pools—the only pools accessible to the poor—post desegregation. The case involved the city of Jackson, Mississippi closing four public pools and transferring the fifth to the YMCA, which was only available to whites. In 1971, the court ruled that the city government could choose to not operate their desegregated facilities if the decision appeared neutral at face value and they are spreading "equal damage" on each person in the area. However, in reality the damage was not equal: the city closed all of the public pools that were affordable to lower income residents whom were largely composed of Black Americans.

== Major incidents and turning points ==
=== Highland Park Pool (Pittsburgh, PA) ===
On opening day of the pool park in 1931, that included two gender integrated pools, a sun deck, and a sandy beach area that overall could hold 10,000 people, prospective Black swimmers were asked to present a "health certificate" indicating the individual was disease free, while white swimmers entered without problem. When some Black swimmers were finally able to get into the park area, violence ensued: a group of Black swimmers who endured verbal intimidation to enter the pool were pelted by rocks, dunked, and punched by white swimmers, while police stationed on deck did nothing except charge the Black swimmers with inciting a riot. In 1935, a Girl Scout troop composed of Black youth organized a day to go to Highland Park Pool with the assistance of the mayor of Pittsburgh. The girls were dunked and splashed by a mob of white youth as stationed police officers turned a blind eye.

=== Paulson Pool (Pittsburgh, PA) ===
In July 1935, at the gender-segregated Paulson Pool, nine-year-old Frank Reynolds was punched and kicked in the dressing room by a gang of white kids then later held underwater by the same group. When Reynolds’ mother filed a police report, inspector Kellie of the local police station, scolded her saying "Why can’t you people use the Washington Boulevard pool (the pool designated for Black swimmers also known as the "Jim Crow Pool") ... I don't approve of colored and white people swimming together".

=== Fairgrounds Pool Park (St. Louis, MO) ===
The Fairgrounds Pool Park, originally built in 1919, reopened on June 21, 1949, for the first day of racially integrated swimming. Black swimmers lined up to enter the pool while being berated by loud boos from white youth outside of the fence surrounding the area. Inside the pool park, a Black man and white youth were stabbed and ten plus others were injured during the ongoing violence that took place over the course of the entire day. Some intimidated Black swimmers who retreated from the pool were followed and beaten up in a nearby street, while those that stayed faced attacks by whites in the pool.

When the pool closed to youths at 5 pm, a white mob that had been growing the entire day roamed the park with bats and clubs attacking every Black person in sight. This event became known as the Fairground Park riot: an event of such violence that the city of St. Louis resorted to segregation to maintain the peace.

The NAACP fought the decision to re-segregate the pool and filed a lawsuit that eventually ended segregation at Fairgrounds pool park the very next summer. That summer, the number of swimmers plummeted from 313,000 to 10,000 swimmers and just six years later in 1956 the pool was closed completely.

=== Monson Motor Lodge (St. Augustine, Fl) ===
Monson Motor Lodge in northern Florida was a hotspot for leisure and tourism. In the early 1960s, Monson Motor Lodge was still illegally segregated, actively denying access to the pool and other amenities to people of color. On June 11, 1964, Dr. Martin Luther King Jr. was refused service by the hotel manager. After refusing to leave, the manager called law enforcement and got Dr. King arrested and sent to Saint Augustine Jail, where he famously wrote "Letter from the Saint Augustine Jail", calling for people to continue the fight against racial discrimination at Monson Motor Lodge.

On June 18, 1964, black and white protestors entered the strictly whites-only pool in Monson Motor Lodge in St. Augustine, Florida. This effort also included college students on Spring Break, where they joined forces with local Civil Rights activists to protest the segregation in Monson Motor Lodge. Over 17 Rabbis and several more protestors were arrested in one of the largest mass arrests of the decade. During this chaos, college students and other young activists jumped into the Monson Motor Lodge pools in what would later famously be known as a 'wade-in'. In an attempt to rid the protestors, Monson Motor Lodge owner James Brock then poured muriatic acid on the swimmers. This image of Brock dumping buckets of acid on the swimmers made it all over U.S. newspapers and media, serving as the face of the Civil Rights Movement in Florida.

The next day, President Lyndon B. Johnson signed into law the Civil Rights Act of 1964—which many believe was an immediate product of the national embarrassment that the Monson Motor Lodge incident caused.

Monson Motor Lodge was demolished in 2003, against the demands of protestors who wanted to preserve the national memory of one of the greatest Civil Rights sit-ins of the 20th century. Replacing it was a new hotel, Hilton Bayfront, with only a singular plaque commemorating the efforts of Dr. Martin Luther King Jr, the Rabbis, and the college students on Spring Break that catapulted the passage of the Civil Rights Act of 1964.

=== Dorothy Dandridge Pool Show (Las Vegas, NV) ===
A Las Vegas hotel completely drained their pool in 1953 because nationally renowned Black entertainer Dorothy Dandridge stuck her toe in the water during one of her performances.

== Swimming at historically black colleges and universities ==
=== Howard University ===
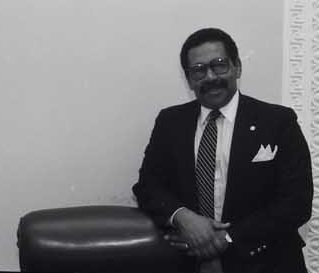
Clarence Pendleton Jr. Working in the White House

As far back as the 1920s, African American swim coach Clarence Pendleton made significant efforts to have the Howard University swim team nationally recognized and award the team the ability to compete with other swim teams. By 1933 he was no longer coaching the team but returned to Howard to give a talk about swimming. In the 1950s, while recreational facilities were still segregated in Washington, D.C., Pendleton worked as a superintendent for the "colored" facilities. Despite continued employment in aquatics and recreational jobs, Pendlton Sr. and his wife struggled financially due to segregation. Pendleton Sr. instilled a strong work ethic in his son, Clarence M. Pendleton Jr., who also coached the Howard Swim team. Pendleton Jr., who was also known as Penny, was quoted as saying his father was a strict disciplinarian who highly valued education and frequently told his son, "If you don't think, you stink." In 1965, Pendleton Jr. traveled to Egypt to coach and mentor Egyptian athletes. In the 1980s, Pendleton's son controversially served as chair of the United States Commission on Civil Rights under President Ronald Reagan.

Howard University is the only HBCU Division 1 team in the United States. As a team that is composed of almost all black swimmers, they are actively fighting the stereotype that black people are less capable swimmers. This assumption along with the fact that minority Americans are twice as likely to drown than white Americans have prompted the Howard team to fight this problem. Occasionally, the team, Sigma Gamma Rho sorority, and Olympians Maritza McClendon and Cullen Jones have worked together to provide free swim clinics to kids in the DC community.

==== Sandra Ann Arrington ====
In 1966 a woman named Sandra Ann Arrington from Columbus, Ohio joined coach Clarence Pendleton, Jr.'s team roster at Howard University as the only woman on the swim team. She was promised the opportunity to tryout for the team when she enrolled at Howard. While at Howard she competed in numerous swimming events and majored in physical education. As a result of her accomplishments in the pool, Arrington was featured in both Jet and Ebony Magazines. In December 1966 she won first place in a diving competition against Millersville State College. The press coverage highlighting her accomplishments frequently mentioned her gender. For example, the Howard University Hilltop newspaper referred to her in print as a "lady diver."

In 1967 Arrington defeated the men she competed against in a diving competition in the Central Intercollegiate Athletic Association (CIAA).

=== Spelman College ===
In 1961 a swim club for women at Spelman College was established.

== Notable activists ==
- Simone Manuel
- Brenda Villa
- Lia Neal
- Ashleigh Johnson
- Cullen Jones
- Sabir Muhammad
- Max Irving
- Schuyler Bailar
- Inez Patterson

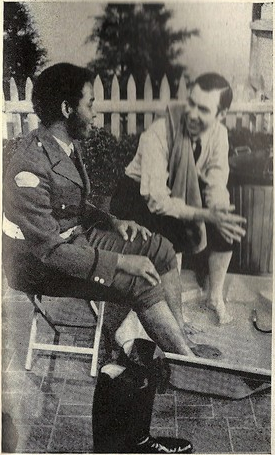
François Clemmons and Fred Rogers having a foot bath on Mr. Rogers Neighborhood

== Media influences ==
TV shows

- In May 1969, Fred Rogers or Mr. Rogers, host of the popular children's show Mister Rogers’ Neighborhood, aired a scene that was directed at the issue of black and white Americans swimming together. In the scene, Mr.Rogers invites black actor Francois Clemmons, who was recurring character Officer Clemmons on the show, to put his feet in a small pool on a hot summer day. The two men then chat by the pool and at the end of the scene Mr. Rogers shares his towel with Officer Clemmons. The scene was interpreted by watchers as a critique of the separation of blacks and whites at pools and a display of how both races can peacefully share the water together. When the scene aired in 1969, segregation was unconstitutional in the United States yet Black Americans still were not treated as equal citizens and did not share pools with fellow White Americans.
- "The Little Rascals" series character Billie "Buckwheat" Thomas, an African-American young boy, was portrayed to be the only child in the friend group that was unable to swim. While the series did not make any direct links between race and swimming capability, the portrayal of Buckwheat as the only non-swimmer in the friend circle reinforced the stereotype that black people are less proficient in swimming. This portrayal perpetuated the misconception that swimming ability is tied to race, even if it was not explicitly stated within the show. The repeated depiction of Buckwheat's inability to swim in various episodes of "The Little Rascals" series contributed to the normalization of this stereotype in popular culture.

Advertising

- Pool advertising, sunblock promotional media, and swimwear commercials often feature predominately white individuals and families, excluding people of color from the imagery associated with aquatics. 20th century advertising hyper-focused on white men and women in their depictions of the idealized 'All-American' pool experience, perpetuating exclusionary standards of leisure.

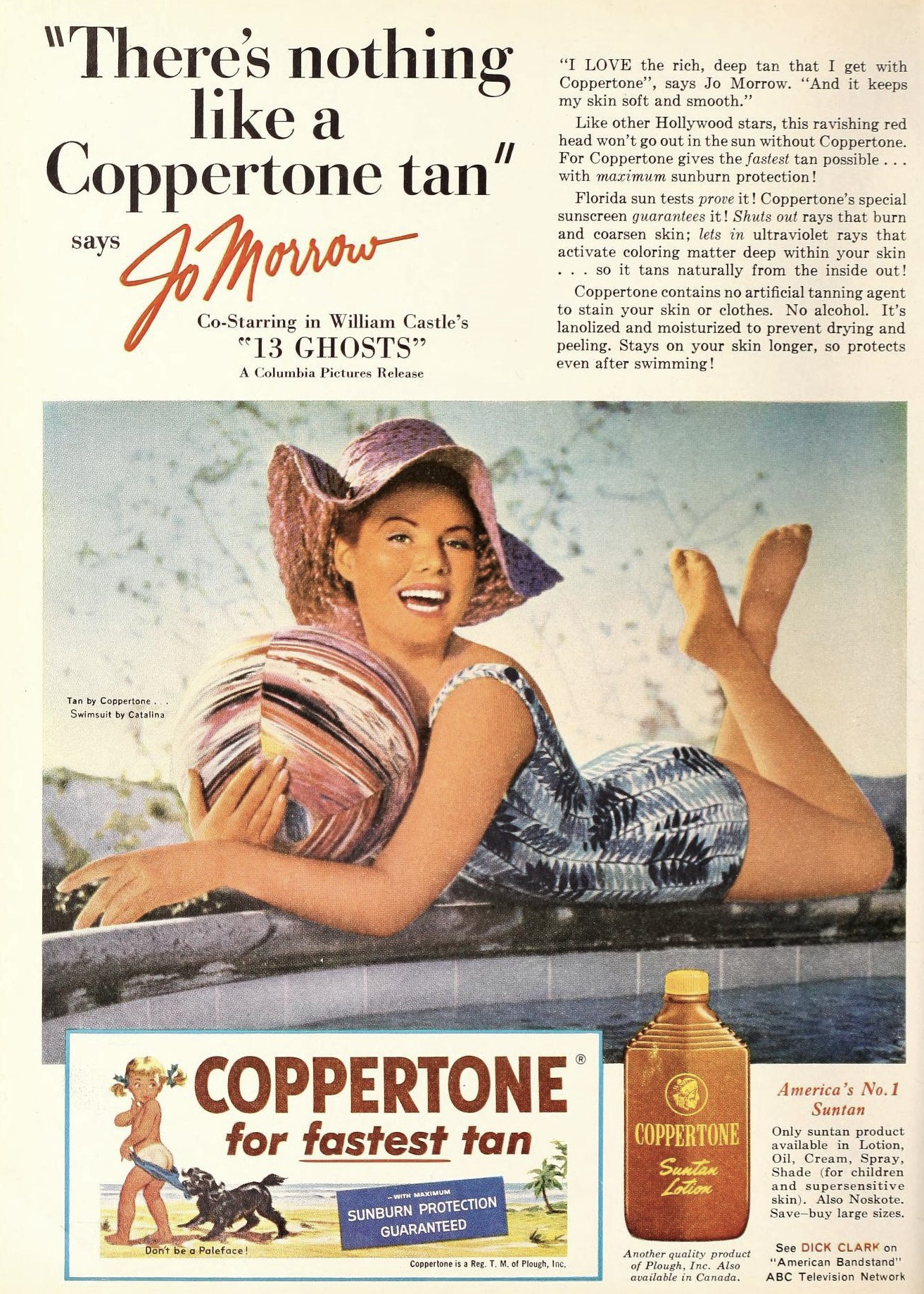
1970s tanning product ad

== See also ==
- American Beach
- Bruce's Beach
- Butler Beach
- Manhattan Beach (Florida)
- Paradise Park, Florida
