= 2014 FINA World Swimming Championships (25 m) – Women's 4 × 50 metre freestyle relay =

Women's 4 × 50 metre freestyle relay at the 2014 FINA World Swimming Championships (25 m)
- Dates: 7 December
- Competitors: 56 from 14 nations
- Winning time: 1:34.24

Medalists
gold medal	Inge Dekker; Femke Heemskerk; Maud van der Meer; Ranomi Kromowidjojo	Netherlands
silver medal	Madison Kennedy; Abbey Weitzeil; Natalie Coughlin; Amy Bilquist	United States
bronze medal	Jeanette Ottesen; Julie Levisen; Mie Nielsen; Pernille Blume	Denmark

The Women's 4 × 50 metre freestyle relay competition of the 2014 FINA World Swimming Championships (25 m) was held on 7 December.

== Records ==
Prior to the competition, the existing world and championship records were as follows.

	Nation	Time	Location	Date
World record	Denmark	1:37.04	Herning	12 December 2013

The following records were established during the competition:

Date	Event	Nation	Time	Record
7 December	Heats	Netherlands	1:35.74	WR, CR
7 December	Final	Netherlands	1:34.24	WR, CR

== Results ==
=== Heats ===
The heats were held at 09:30.

Rank	Heat	Lane	Nation	Swimmers	Time	Notes
1	2	0	Netherlands	Esmee Vermeulen (25.09); Ranomi Kromowidjojo (23.01); Maud van der Meer (23.89); Inge Dekker (23.75)	1:35.74	Q, WR
2	1	2	France	Anna Santamans (24.15); Mélanie Henique (24.49); Mathilde Cini (24.50); Marie Wattel (24.62)	1:37.76	Q
3	1	4	United States	Abbey Weitzeil (24.23); Amy Bilquist (24.13); Kathleen Baker (24.90); Amanda Weir	1:37.87	Q
4	1	3	Italy	Silvia Di Pietro (24.51); Erika Ferraioli (24.08); Giada Galizi (25.01); Ilaria Bianchi (24.87)	1:38.47	Q
5	2	5	Denmark	Mie Nielsen (24.72); Julie Levisen (24.69); Sarah Bro (24.68); Pernille Blume (24.46)	1:38.55	Q
6	1	5	China	Qiu Yuhan (24.91); Tang Yi (24.57); Shen Duo (24.65); Xiang Liu (24.54)	1:38.67	Q
7	2	4	Japan	Yayoi Matsumoto (25.17); Miki Uchida (24.01); Rino Hosoda (25.17); Sayaka Akase (25.57)	1:39.92	Q
8	1	7	Brazil	Alessandra Marchioro (25.17); Daiane Oliveira (24.28); Daynara de Paula (25.17); Manuella Lyrio (25.50)	1:40.12	Q
9	2	1	Russia	Margarita Nesterova (25.42); Arina Openysheva (25.27); Anastasiia Osipenko (25.63); Anastasiia Liazeva (25.08)	1:41.40	
10	2	8	Turkey	Ekaterina Avramova (25.42); Esra Kübra Kaçmaz (25.41); Sezin Eligül (26.49); İlknur Nihan Çakıcı (25.19)	1:42.51	
11	2	6	South Africa	Erin Gallagher (25.41); Lehesta Kemp (25.03); Trudi Maree (25.26); Rene Warnes (27.08)	1:42.78	
12	2	7	Macau	Chi Yan Tan (26.84); On Kei Lei (26.17); Weng Tong Choi (27.52); Chi Wai Long (26.84)	1:47.37	
13	1	8	India	Aditi Dhumatkar (26.40); Anusha Sanjeev Mehta (27.96); Thalasha Satish Prabhu (27.63); Malavika Vishwanath (28.03)	1:50.02	
14	2	2	San Marino	Beatrice Felici (27.12); Elena Giovannini (27.51); Elisa Bernardi (28.10); Chiara Gualtieri (28.29)	1:51.02	
—	1	1	Papua New Guinea		DNS	
—	1	6	Algeria		DNS	
—	2	3	Sweden		DNS	

=== Final ===
The final was held at 18:00.

Rank	Lane	Nation	Swimmers	Time	Notes
1st place, gold medalist(s)	4	Netherlands	Inge Dekker (24.09); Femke Heemskerk (23.24); Maud van der Meer (24.03); Ranomi Kromowidjojo (22.88)	1:34.24	WR
2nd place, silver medalist(s)	3	United States	Madison Kennedy (24.06); Abbey Weitzeil (23.40); Natalie Coughlin (23.39); Amy Bilquist (23.76)	1:34.61	AM
3rd place, bronze medalist(s)	2	Denmark	Jeanette Ottesen (23.73); Julie Levisen (24.30); Mie Nielsen (23.49); Pernille Blume (23.96)	1:35.48	
4	6	Italy	Silvia Di Pietro (24.30); Erika Ferraioli (23.35); Aglaia Pezzato (23.89); Giada Galizi (24.24)	1:35.78	
5	5	France	Anna Santamans (24.05); Mélanie Henique (24.11); Mathilde Cini (24.18); Charlotte Bonnet (23.98)	1:36.82	
6	7	China	Qiu Yuhan (24.72); Tang Yi (24.16); Shen Duo (25.07); Xiang Liu (24.63)	1:38.58	
7	1	Japan	Miki Uchida (24.22); Yayoi Matsumoto (24.56); Tomomi Aoki (24.83); Rino Hosoda (25.15)	1:38.76	
8	8	Brazil	Daiane Oliveira (25.11); Larissa Oliveira (24.18); Alessandra Marchioro (24.87); Daynara de Paula (24.62)	1:38.78	SA
