= 2014 Pan Pacific Swimming Championships – Women's 4 × 100 metre freestyle relay =

Women's 4 × 100 metre freestyle relay at the 2014 Pan Pacific Swimming Championships
- Venue: Gold Coast Aquatic Centre
- Dates: August 23, 2014 (heats & finals)
- Winning time: 3:32.46

Medalists
gold medal	Cate Campbell, Brittany Elmslie, Melanie Schlanger and Bronte Campbell	Australia
silver medal	Simone Manuel, Missy Franklin, Abbey Weitzeil and Shannon Vreeland	United States
bronze medal	Miki Uchida, Misaki Yamaguchi, Yasuko Miyamoto and Yayoi Matsumoto	Japan

The women's 4 × 100 metre freestyle relay competition at the 2014 Pan Pacific Swimming Championships took place on August 23 at the Gold Coast Aquatic Centre. The last champion was the United States.

This race consisted of eight lengths of the pool. Each of the four swimmers completed two lengths of the pool. The first swimmer had to touch the wall before the second could leave the starting block.

== Records ==
Prior to this competition, the existing world and Pan Pacific records were as follows:

World record	Australia (AUS); Bronte Campbell (53.15); Melanie Schlanger (52.76); Emma McKeon (52.91); Cate Campbell (52.16)	3:30.98	Glasgow, Scotland	July 24, 2014
Pan Pacific Championships record	United States (USA); Natalie Coughlin (54.25); Jessica Hardy (53.43); Amanda Weir (53.85); Dana Vollmer (53.58)	3:35.11	Irvine, United States	August 20, 2010

== Results ==
All times are in minutes and seconds.

KEY:	q	Fastest non-qualifiers	Q	Qualified	CR	Championships record	NR	National record	PB	Personal best	SB	Seasonal best

=== Heats ===
Heats weren't performed, as only seven teams had entered.

=== Final ===
The final was held on August 23, at 21:08.

Rank	Name	Nationality	Time	Notes
1st place, gold medalist(s)	Cate Campbell (52.89); Brittany Elmslie (53.72); Melanie Schlanger (52.97); Bronte Campbell (52.88)	Australia	3:32.46	CR
2nd place, silver medalist(s)	Simone Manuel (53.25); Missy Franklin (53.38); Abbey Weitzeil (53.81); Shannon Vreeland (53.79)	United States	3:34.23	
3rd place, bronze medalist(s)	Miki Uchida (54.76); Misaki Yamaguchi (54.83); Yasuko Miyamoto (55.05); Yayoi Matsumoto (54.42)	Japan	3:39.06	
4	Chantal van Landeghem (54.43); Victoria Poon (54.68); Michelle Williams (55.16); Alyson Ackman (55.16)	Canada	3:39.78	
5	Graciele Herrmann (55.53); Etiene Medeiros (55.01); Daynara de Paula (55.89); Alessandra Marchioro (55.77)	Brazil	3:42.20	
6	Samantha Lucie-Smith (56.45); Laura Quilter (55.90); Samantha Lee (57.15); Emma Robinson (58.01)	New Zealand	3:47.51	
7	Camille Cheng (55.68); Kin Lok Chan (58.38); Claudia Lau (59.26); Sze Hang Yu (57.15)	Hong Kong	3:50.47	
