= Amy Bilquist =

American swimmer (born 1997)

Personal information
- Born: August 11, 1997 (age 28) Scottsdale, Arizona, U.S.

Sport
- Sport: Swimming
- Strokes: Backstroke, Freestyle
- Club: DC Trident; LA Current; Scottsdale Aquatic Club
- College team: University of California, Berkeley
Medal record
Women's swimming
Representing the United States
| Event | 1st | 2nd | 3rd |
|---|---|---|---|
| World Championships (SC) | 1 | 2 | 0 |
| Total | 1 | 2 | 0 |
World Championships (SC)
| Gold medal – first place | 2014 Doha | 4×50 m mixed freestyle |
| Silver medal – second place | 2014 Doha | 4×50 m freestyle |
| Silver medal – second place | 2014 Doha | 4×100 m freestyle |
Junior Pan Pacific Championships
| Gold medal – first place | 2014 Maui | 50 m freestyle |
| Gold medal – first place | 2014 Maui | 100 m backstroke |
| Gold medal – first place | 2014 Maui | 4×200 m freestyle |
| Gold medal – first place | 2014 Maui | 4×100 m medley |
| Silver medal – second place | 2014 Maui | 4×100 m freestyle |
Representing the California Golden Bears
| Event | 1st | 2nd | 3rd |
|---|---|---|---|
| NCAA Championships | 5 | 6 | 3 |
| Total | 5 | 6 | 3 |
By race
| Event | 1st | 2nd | 3rd |
|---|---|---|---|
| 100 y backstroke | 0 | 1 | 0 |
| 4×50 y freestyle | 3 | 1 | 0 |
| 4×100 y freestyle | 1 | 1 | 1 |
| 4×200 y freestyle | 0 | 2 | 2 |
| 4×50 y medley | 0 | 1 | 0 |
| 4×100 y medley | 1 | 0 | 0 |
| Total | 5 | 6 | 3 |
NCAA Championships
| Gold medal – first place | 2016 Atlanta | 4×50 y freestyle |
| Gold medal – first place | 2017 Indianapolis | 4×50 y freestyle |
| Gold medal – first place | 2019 Austin | 4×50 y freestyle |
| Gold medal – first place | 2019 Austin | 4×100 y freestyle |
| Gold medal – first place | 2019 Austin | 4×100 y medley |
| Silver medal – second place | 2017 Indianapolis | 4×200 y freestyle |
| Silver medal – second place | 2018 Columbus | 4×50 y freestyle |
| Silver medal – second place | 2018 Columbus | 4×100 y freestyle |
| Silver medal – second place | 2018 Columbus | 4×50 y medley |
| Silver medal – second place | 2019 Austin | 100 y backstroke |
| Silver medal – second place | 2019 Austin | 4×200 y freestyle |
| Bronze medal – third place | 2016 Atlanta | 4×200 y freestyle |
| Bronze medal – third place | 2017 Indianapolis | 4×100 y freestyle |
| Bronze medal – third place | 2018 Columbus | 4×200 y freestyle |

Amy Bilquist (born August 11, 1997) is an American competitive swimmer who specializes in the backstroke and freestyle events. She represented LA Current in the 2019 season of the International Swimming League and will represent DC Trident in the 2020 season.

== Early life ==
Amy Bilquist was born August 11, 1997, in Scottsdale, Arizona, as the daughter of Brent and Julie Bilquist. Bilquist attended and swam for Carmel High School in Carmel, Indiana under head coach Chris Plumb. She was the Indiana state record-holder in the 50 and 100-yard freestyle, 200-yard medley relay, 200-yard and 400-yard freestyle relays. Bilquist swam collegiately at the University of California, Berkeley from 2015 to 2019.

== College career ==
As a freshman for the Bears, Bilquist won the 200-yard backstroke at the 2016 Pac-12 Championship Meet, third in the 100-yard backstroke, and seventh in the 50-yard freestyle. At the 2016 Women's NCAA Division I Championships, Bilquist finished fourth in the 100-yard backstroke, fifth in the 200-yard backstroke and was part of the 200-yard freestyle relay that took home the victory.

At the Pac-12 Championships of the following year, Bilquist finished fourth in the 200-yard backstroke (1:51.22), fifth in the 100-yard backstroke (51.29) and eighth in the 50-yard freestyle (22.13). At the 2017 Women's NCAA Division I Championships, Bilquist finished ninth in the 100-yard backstroke (50.86), 14th in the 200-yard backstroke (1:52.03) and 17th in the 50-yard freestyle (22.00). She was also part of Cal's gold medal in the 200-yard freestyle relay, as well as a member on the runner-up 800-yard and third place 400-yard freestyle relay teams.

As a junior, Bilquist finished third in the 50-yard freestyle and 100-yard backstroke, and fourth in the 200-yard backstroke at the 2018 Pac-12 Championships. She was a member of all three freestyle relays as well as of the 200-yard medley relay that won Pac-12 titles. At 2018 Women's NCAA Division I Championships she finished eight in the 100-yard freestyle, ninth in the 50-yard freestyle and 10th in the 100-yard backstroke. She also contributed to the second-place finish of the 200 and 400-yard freestyle relays, and 200-yard medley relays, as well as third-place finish of the 800-yard freestyle relay.

At her final 2019 Pac-12 Championships, Bilquist won the 100-yard backstroke, while she was runner-up in the 50 and 100-yard freestyle. She also contributed to four winning relays - 200, 400 and 800-yard freestyle and 400-yard medley relay. At the 2019 Women's NCAA Division I Championships she placed second in the 100-yard backstroke, and finished sixth in both the 50 and 100-yard freestyle. She was a member of three winning relay teams at the meet: 200 and 400-yard freestyle relay, and 400-yard medley relay.

== International career ==
=== 2014 Junior Pan Pacific Championships ===
Bilquist was named to the USA Junior National Team after qualifying for the 2014 Junior Pan Pacific Swimming Championships, where she won gold in the 50m freestyle and 100m backstroke. She was also part of the 400m medley and freestyle relays which were two new Junior World Records.

=== 2014 World Championships (25m) ===
Bilquist competed at the 2014 FINA World Swimming Championships (25 m) in Doha, Qatar and went home with three medals: two silvers in the women's 4×50 m freestyle and 4×100 m freestyle relays and a gold in the 4×50 m mixed freestyle relay.

=== 2016 Olympic Trials ===
She placed third in the 100m backstroke and fourth in the 200m backstroke, just missing out the Olympic team by one and two spots.

=== International Swimming League ===
Bilquist was a member of the inaugural International Swimming League (ISL) representing LA Current. She competed at the first match of the second block of the ISL held in Lewisville, Texas, as well as in the Budapest match and American Derby held in College Park, Maryland. LA Current qualified for the final match in Las Vegas and finished fourth. Bilquist will represent DC Trident in the 2020–2021 season.
