= Greg Meehan =

American swimming coach

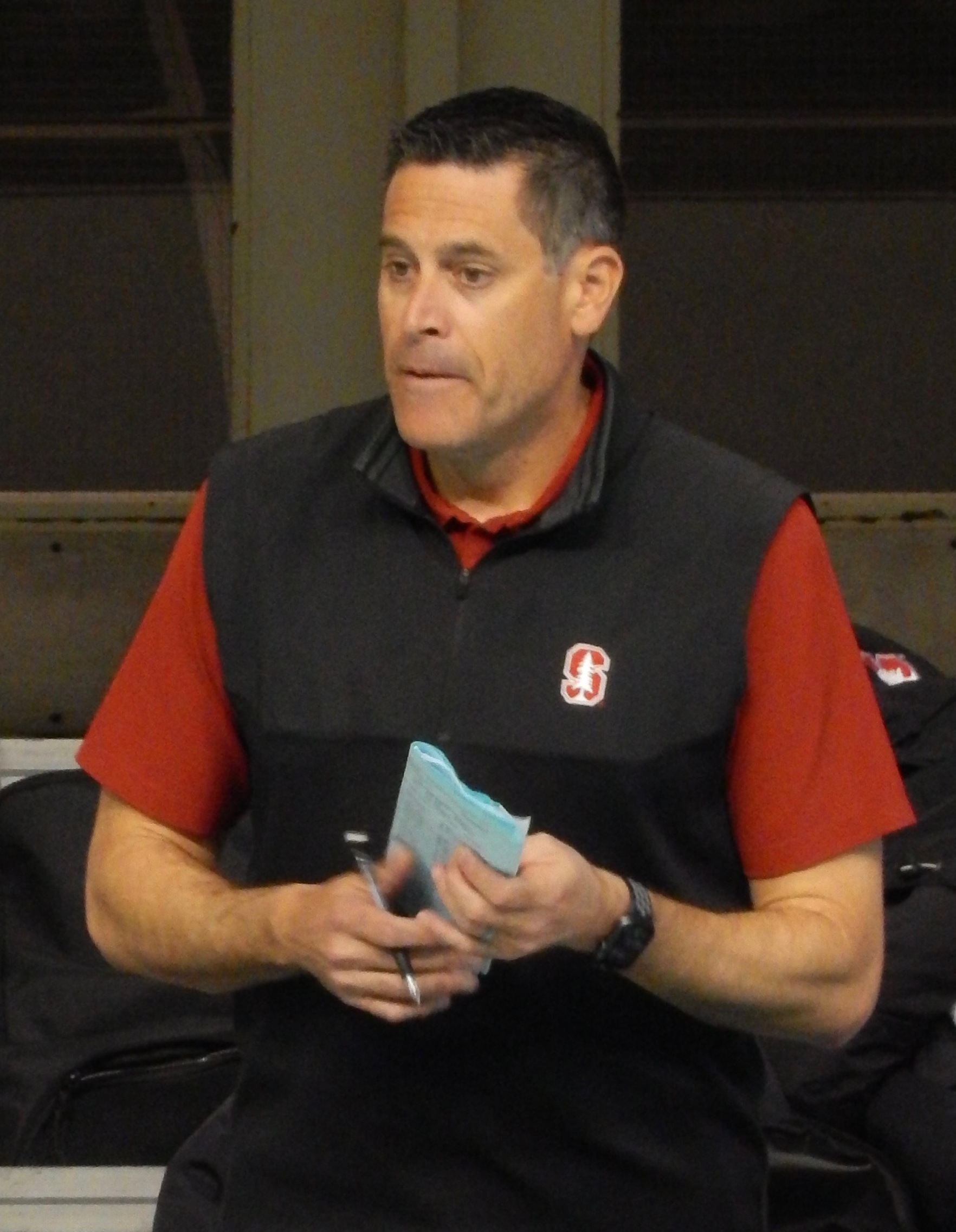
- Meehan at the 2023 Pac-12 Championships

Biographical details
- Born: circa 1976
- Education: Rider University; 1998, 2001 Graduate

Playing career
- 1995–1998: Rider University
- Position: backstroker

Coaching career (HC unless noted)
- 1998–1999: William and Mary; Asst. Coach, Interim Coach
- 1999–2001: Princeton University; Asst. Coach, Women
- 2001–2005: UCLA; Asst. Coach, Women
- 2005–2008: University of the Pacific; Men, Women's Team
- 2008–2011: University of California; Men' Asst. Coach
- 2011–2012: University of California; Men's Head Coach
- 2012–2023: Stanford University; Women's Swimming; Head coach

Head coaching record
- Overall: 47–4 dual meet record Stanford Women (As of 2017)

Accomplishments and honors

Championships
- '13, '17, '18, '23; 4 x Pac-12 Conference Champions (Stanford Women); 2 x NCAA Championships 2017–2018 (Stanford Women)

Awards
- Golden Goggle Award ('17 Coach of the Year); Pac-12 Conference (Coach of the Year for Women); 3 x CSCAA Swim. Coach of the Year

Greg Meehan is an American Olympic and college swimming coach who has served as the women's head coach for the Stanford swim team since 2012, winning NCAA championships in 2017 and 2018. He was an Olympic Coach for the US Women's Olympic Swimming Team in 2016 and 2020.

== High School swimmer ==
Meehan swam for Cardinal O'Hara High School in Marple Township outside Philadelphia, under Coach Kevin Speicher, where he performed well in the 100 backstroke and 200 and 500 freestyle events. In the National Catholic Championships at Villanova in February 1992, Meehan won the 500 freestyle event.

== College swimmer ==
As a collegiate athlete, Meehan swam for Rider University, in Lawrenceville, New Jersey, excelling as a back stroker and distance freestyler. Majoring in Mathematics and Secondary Education, he was a four-time All-Academic Team Member who graduated in 1998. He had the second fastest 200 backstroke at that time, and also excelled in the 100 backstroke and the 1,000 freestyle. He swam in the Metro Atlantic Athletic Conference (MAAC) Champion Relay Team. Rider placed second of eight teams in the Metro Atlantic Athletic Conference Swimming and Diving Championships from 1996–1999.

== Stanford University women's swim coach ==
From 2012–2025, he was the head coach and director for Stanford University women's swimming, where he led the team to four Pac-12 Conference championships, in '13, '17, '18 and '23.

In 2017 and 2018, the Stanford women's team won back-to-back NCAA championships.

At the 2023 Pac-12 Conference Championships, held at King County Aquatic Center in Federal Way, Washington, he coached Stanford Cardinal women's swimmers to the second-largest winning margin by a team in a 27 year time period, 485 points, with a combined team score of 1725.5 points. He was named the Pac-12 Conference Women's Swimming Coach of the Year for the 2022–2023 season.

== Prior coaching positions ==
He served as an associate head coach at the University of California, Berkeley (also called Cal) from 2008–2012, coaching as a head coach from 2011–2012. Prior to Cal, Meehan was the men's and women's head coach at University of the Pacific from 2005–2008. He was a UCLA women's assistant coach from 2001–2005, and a women's assistant coach at Princeton from 1999–2001. Prior to Princeton, he was an assistant and interim head coach at William and Mary from 1998–1999.

== 2016 Summer Olympics coach ==
In 2016, Meehan was selected to be an assistant coach for the US Women's Olympic Swimming Team. Meehan coached Katie Ledecky, Maya DiRado, Simone Manuel, and Lia Neal to eleven gold medals, seven silver medals, and two bronze medals.

== 2020 Summer Olympics coach ==
In 2018, Meehan was announced as the head coach for women on the 2020 US Olympic Swim Team. The women's team had a total of 35 members including pool and open water swimmers. He had five assistant coaches as part of his coaching team for the Olympic Games, there were a total of eight assistant coaches for both men and women. Under his coaching guidance, the women achieved 18 total Olympic medals at the 2020 Summer Olympics in Tokyo, Japan in July and August 2021, including three gold medals.

For the 2022 World Aquatics Championships, Meehan was one of five assistant coaches selected to the coaching squad for pool swimmers at the Championships.

== Awards and honors ==
- Golden Goggle Award, Coach of the Year: 2017, 2018
- Pac-12 Conference, Coach of the Year (for women's swimming): 2021–2022, 2022–2023
- Rider University, Rider Broncs, Hall of Fame: 2017 inductee
- SwimSwam, Swammy Award, United States Coach of the Year: 2019
