= Abbey Weitzeil =

American swimmer (born 1996)

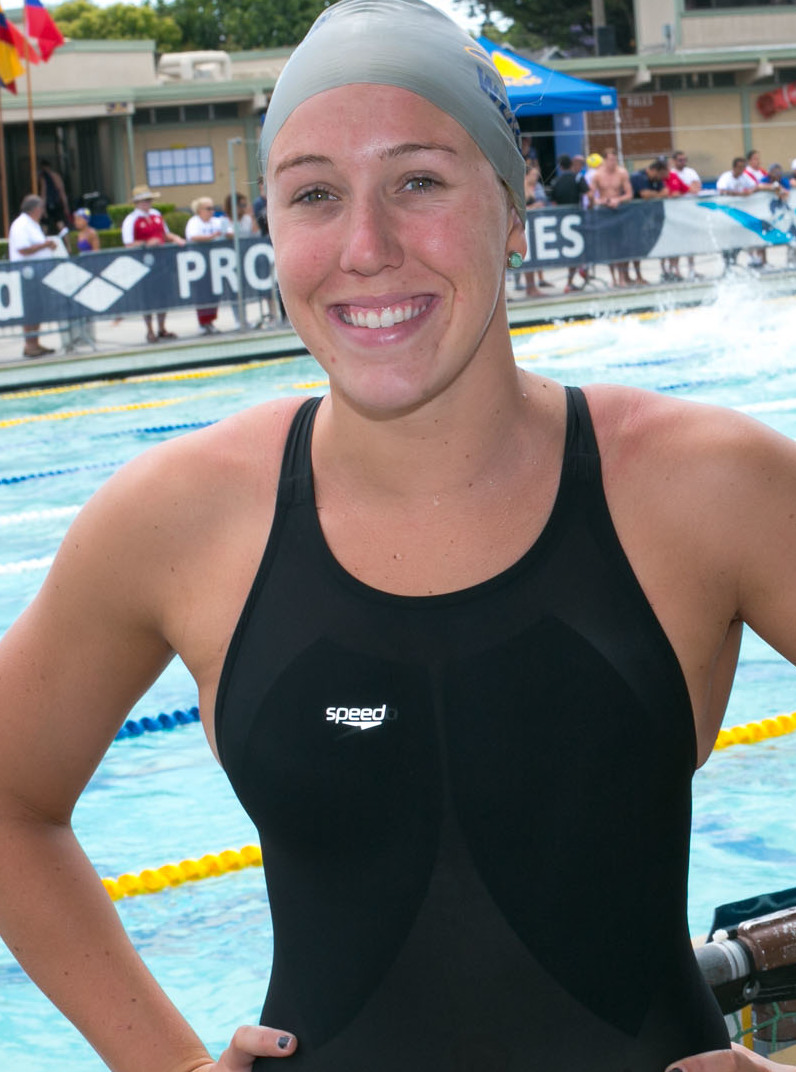
- Weitzeil in 2017

Personal information
- Full name: Abbigail Weitzeil
- National team: United States
- Born: December 3, 1996 (age 29) Santa Clarita, California, U.S.
- Height: 5 ft 10 in (178 cm)
- Weight: 130 lb (59 kg)

Sport
- Sport: Swimming
- Strokes: Freestyle
- Club: Canyons Aquatic Club
- College team: University of California, Berkeley
- Coach: Teri McKeever; Coley Stickels
Medal record
Women's swimming
Representing United States
Event	1st	2nd	3rd
Olympic Games	2	3	1
World Championships (LC)	3	3	1
World Championships (SC)	3	5	1
Pan Pacific Championships	0	1	0
Summer Universiade	1	1	1
Total	9	13	4
Olympic Games
Gold medal – first place	2016 Rio de Janeiro	4×100 m medley
Gold medal – first place	2024 Paris	4×100 m mixed medley
Silver medal – second place	2016 Rio de Janeiro	4×100 m freestyle
Silver medal – second place	2020 Tokyo	4×100 m medley
Silver medal – second place	2024 Paris	4×100 m freestyle
Bronze medal – third place	2020 Tokyo	4×100 m freestyle
World Championships (LC)
Gold medal – first place	2015 Kazan	4×100 m mixed freestyle
Gold medal – first place	2019 Gwangju	4×100 m mixed freestyle
Gold medal – first place	2023 Fukuoka	4×100 m medley
Silver medal – second place	2019 Gwangju	4×100 m freestyle
Silver medal – second place	2023 Fukuoka	4×100 m freestyle
Silver medal – second place	2023 Fukuoka	4×100 m mixed freestyle
Bronze medal – third place	2015 Kazan	4×100 m freestyle
Bronze medal – third place	2023 Fukuoka	4×100 m mixed medley
World Championships (SC)
Gold medal – first place	2014 Doha	4×50 m mixed free
Gold medal – first place	2021 Abu Dhabi	4×50 m freestyle
Gold medal – first place	2021 Abu Dhabi	4×100 m freestyle
Silver medal – second place	2014 Doha	4×50 m freestyle
Silver medal – second place	2014 Doha	4×100 m freestyle
Silver medal – second place	2021 Abu Dhabi	4×50 m medley
Silver medal – second place	2021 Abu Dhabi	4×50 m mixed medley
Silver medal – second place	2021 Abu Dhabi	4×200 m freestyle
Bronze medal – third place	2021 Abu Dhabi	100 m freestyle
Pan Pacific Championships
Silver medal – second place	2014 Gold Coast	4×100 m freestyle
Summer Universiade
Gold medal – first place	2015 Gwangju	4×100 m freestyle
Silver medal – second place	2015 Gwangju	100 m freestyle
Bronze medal – third place	2015 Gwangju	4×100 m medley

Abbigail Weitzeil (born December 3, 1996) is an American competition swimmer specializing in sprint freestyle. A multiple time Olympic medalist, she won a gold medal in the 4x100-meter medley relay for swimming in the preliminary heats and a silver medal in the 4x100-meter freestyle relay at the 2016 Rio Olympics. At the 2020 Summer Olympics she won a silver medal in the 4x100-meter medley relay and a bronze medal in the 4x100-meter freestyle relay, swimming in the final of both events. She is the American record holder in the 50-yard freestyle and is part of the American Record in the 4x100-meter freestyle relay.

== Early life and education ==
Weitzeil grew up in Santa Clarita, California. She attended Saugus High School, where she was a four-time CIF Champion in swimming and set national records in the 50 yard and 100 yard freestyle.

Weitzeil attended University of California, Berkeley from 2016 to 2020 and swam collegiately for the California Golden Bears. In her senior year at California, Weitzeil was the winner of the Honda Sports Award, given to the nation's top female collegiate competitor in swimming and diving.In September of 2024 she married former Cal swimmer Micheal Jenson. In August of 2025, they announced they were expecting their first child together, a boy.

== Swimming career ==
=== 2014 ===
==== Speedo Winter Junior National Championships ====
At the 2014 Speedo Winter Junior National Championships in Federal Way, Washington, Weitzeil set the American Record in the 100-yard freestyle. Her record time of 46.29 bested the previous record held by Simone Manuel by 0.33. She set the record while swimming lead off for Canyons Aquatic Club's 4x100 Freestyle relay. Weitzeil became the 17th teenager to hold the record in that event. This was the first American Record ever set at a Junior National event.

==== International Debut & Pan Pacifics ====
At the 2014 Phillips 66 Nationals, the selection meet for the 2014 Pan Pacific Swimming Championships and 2015 World Championships, Weitzeil qualified for both meets by finishing fifth in the 50-meter freestyle and fourth in the 100-meter freestyle. At the Pan Pacific Championships, her first international swimming competition, Weitzeil finished 10th in the 100-meter free. She also won silver as a member of the 400-meter free relay alongside Simone Manuel, Missy Franklin, and Shannon Vreeland, splitting 53.81 seconds on her leg.

==== 2014 World Swimming Championships ====
Later that year, Weitzeil went on to win one gold and two silver medals at the 2014 World Short Course Championships.

=== 2015 World Championships ===
At the 2015 World Championships, she won a gold medal in the 4x100-meter mixed freestyle relay and a bronze in 4x100-meter freestyle relay. She swam in the preliminary heats for both relays.

=== 2016 ===
==== 2016 American Short Course Championships ====
At the 2016 American Short Course Championships in Austin, Texas Weitzeil set the American Record in the 50 yard Freestyle with a time of 21.12. The previous record held by Lara Jackson was a 21.27 and was set during the "super suit" era.

==== 2016 US Olympic Trials ====
Weitzeil qualified for her first Olympics by sweeping both the 50- and the 100-meter freestyles at the 2016 US Olympic trials. In the 100-meter freestyle, she won with a time of 53.28 seconds, 24 hundredths of a second ahead of second-place finisher Simone Manuel. She also finished first in the 50-meter freestyle with a time of 24.28.

==== 2016 Summer Olympics ====
2016 Summer Olympics
Gold medal – first place	4×100 m medley relay	3:53.13
Silver medal – second place	4×100 m freestyle relay	3:31.89 (AM)

On the first night of the swimming portion at the Olympics, she won a silver medal as part of the 4×100-meter freestyle relay along with Manuel, Dana Vollmer, and Katie Ledecky in 3:31.89, which was a new American Record. Her split of 52.56 was the fastest among her team. She also swam in the preliminary heats of the 4x100-meter medley relay and received a gold medal when the team won in the finals. In her individual events, Weitzeil finished seventh in the 100-meter freestyle with a time of 53.30 and missed qualifying for the final of the 50-meter freestyle.

=== 2020 ===
When the COVID-19 pandemic briefly resulted in the 2020 Summer Olympics being cancelled before venues could be secured for July 2021, Weitzeil did not stop her training. She commuted to different pools that were open to remain on track for the Olympics which ended up being postponed to 2021.

=== 2021 ===
==== 2020 Summer Olympics ====
2020 Summer Olympics
Silver medal – second place	4x100 m medley relay	3:51.73
Bronze medal – third place	4×100 m freestyle relay	3:32.81

Weitzeil made the US Olympic swim team in two individual events for the 2020 Olympic Games in Tokyo, Japan, the 50-meter freestyle and the 100-meter freestyle. She also made the team in the 4x100-meter freestyle relay.

On day two of competition, Weitzeil swam in the final of the 4x100-meter freestyle relay, spitting the fastest 100-meter swim of any of the swimmers on the American relay with a 52.68. She and her relay teammates won the bronze medal with a relay time of 3:32.81 in the final. Weitzeil became the first University of California, Berkeley athlete to win a medal at the 2020 Olympics in any sport.

In her first individual race at the 2020 Olympics, the prelims of the 100-meter freestyle on day five of competition, Weitzeil ranked eleventh for all prelims heats with her time of 53.21 and advanced to the semifinals. In the semifinals of the event, Weitzeil lowered her time to a 52.99 and qualified for the final ranked seventh overall. Weitzeil swam the freestyle leg of the 4x100-meter mixed medley relay in the prelims heats on day six, participating in the first swimming race in the history of the Olympic Games that men and women competed in the same event. She helped the relay finish ranked second overall and advance to the final.

In the final of the 100-meter freestyle on day seven, Weitzeil placed eighth. Later the same day, Weitzel ranked seventh in the prelims of the 50-meter freestyle with her time of 24.37 and advanced to the semifinals. In the semifinals of the 50-meter freestyle on day eight, Weitzeil swam a personal best time of 24.19 and advanced to the final ranked fourth overall.

On the final day of competition, Weitzeil placed eighth with a time of 24.41 in the final of the 50-meter freestyle. For each of her individual events, the 50 meter and 100 meter freestyle, Weitzeil was the highest ranking female American swimmer and the only one to make it to the final of each event. In the final of the 4x100-meter medley relay she swam the freestyle leg of the relay and won the silver medal in the event with her finals relay teammates Regan Smith, Lydia Jacoby, Torri Huske, as well as the swimmers who had swum on the prelims relay.

==== International Swimming League ====
Weitzeil was selected for Team LA Current as part of the 2021 International Swimming League.

==== 2021 World Short Course Championships ====
2021 World Championships
Gold medal – first place	4×100 m freestyle	3:28.52
Gold medal – first place	4×50 m freestyle	1:34.22
Silver medal – second place	4×50 m medley	1:43.61
Silver medal – second place	4×50 m mixed medley	1:37.04
Silver medal – second place	4×200 m freestyle	7:36.53
Bronze medal – third place	100 m freestyle	51.64

Weitzeil entered to compete in a mix of individual events, which included the 100-meter individual medley, 50-meter freestyle, and 100-meter freestyle, for the 2021 World Short Course Championships in Abu Dhabi, United Arab Emirates in December.

In the final of the 4×100-meter freestyle relay on the first day of competition, Weitzeil substituted in for Torri Huske, and helped win a gold medal in a time of 3:28.52 which tied the relay team from Canada. The tie between the United States and the Canada relay teams was the first time in the history of the FINA World Short Course Championships that two teams tied for the gold medal in the event. On the second day, Weitzeil ranked fourth overall in the prelims heats of the 100-meter freestyle, qualifying for the semifinals with her time of 52.81 seconds. In the evening, Weitzeil won a silver medal in the 4×50 meter medley relay in 1:43.61, anchoring the relay with a time of 23.10 seconds. Later in the same session, Weitzeil qualified for the final of the 100 meter freestyle ranking fifth in the semifinals with a 52.29. For her third and final event of the evening, Weitzeil anchored the 4×50 meter mixed freestyle relay in 23.17 seconds, contributing to the 1:29.04 for a fourth-place finish.

On day three, Weitzeil swam a 59.44 in the prelims heats of the 100 meter individual medley, qualifying for the semifinals ranking eighth. Later in the day she won a bronze medal in the final of the 100 meter freestyle, finishing less than half a second behind silver medalist Sarah Sjöström of Sweden with a time of 51.64 seconds. For her second event of the evening Weitzeil placed ninth in the semifinals of the 100 meter individual medley with a time of 59.00 seconds and did not qualify for the final. Weitzeil concluded her competition on day three with the final of the 4×50 meter mixed medley relay, where she split a 23.21 to help achieve a 1:37.04 and earn the silver medal. In the morning prelims on day five, Weitzeil qualified for the semifinals of the 50 meter freestyle with a time of 23.69 seconds and ranking third overall. For the semifinals, Weitzeil ranked fourth and qualified for the final with a 23.63. Wrapping up her day five events, Weitzeil won a silver medal as part of the 4×200 meter freestyle relay, splitting a 1:54.31 for the second leg of the relay to contribute to the final time of 7:36.53.

Day six of six days of competition, Weitzeil anchored the 4×50 meter freestyle relay with a 23.62 in the prelims heats, contributing to a time of 1:35.88 and number one ranking heading into the final. She split a 23.59 leading-off the 4×50 meter freestyle relay in the final, helping win the gold medal in a time of 1:34.22. In her second event of the evening, Weitzeil swam a 23.58 and placed fifth in the final of the 50 meter freestyle. For the final event of the championships, Weitzeil anchored the 4×100 metre medley relay with a 51.06, the fastest freestyle split out of all relays in the final by over two-tenths of a second, to contribute to a fourth-place finish in 3:47.68.

== Personal best times ==
=== Long course meters (50 m pool) ===
Event	Time	Meet	Location	Date	Notes	Ref
50 m freestyle	24.00	2023 USA Swimming Championships	Indianapolis, IN, USA	July 1, 2023	sf	
100 m freestyle	52.99	2020 Summer Olympics	Tokyo, Japan	July 29, 2021	sf	

Legend: sf – semifinal

=== Short course meters (25 m pool) ===
Event	Time	Meet	Location	Date	Notes
50 m freestyle	23.44	2021 International Swimming League	Naples, Italy	September 18, 2021	AM
100 m freestyle	51.26	2020 International Swimming League	Budapest, Hungary	November 10, 2020	AM
50 m breaststroke	30.91	2020 International Swimming League	Budapest, Hungary	October 16, 2020	
50 m butterfly	25.35	2021 International Swimming League	Naples, Italy	September 19, 2021	
100 m individual medley	58.59	2020 International Swimming League	Budapest, Hungary	October 25, 2020	

Legend: AM – Americas record; e – equalled existing record;
Records not set in finals: h – heat; sf – semifinal; r – relay 1st leg; rh – relay heat 1st leg; b – B final; † – en route to final mark; so – swim-off; tt – time trial

== Awards and honors ==
- SwimSwam Top 100 (Women's): 2021 (#38), 2022 (#50)

== See also ==
- List of Olympic medalists in swimming (women)
- List of World Swimming Championships (25 m) medalists (women)
- List of United States records in swimming

Records
Preceded by Sergey Fesikov, Vladimir Morozov, Rozaliya Nasretdinova, Veronika Popova	Mixed 4 × 50 metres freestyle relay world record-holder December 6, 2014 – present With: Josh Schneider, Matt Grevers, Madison Kennedy	Succeeded by Incumbents
