= Simone Manuel =

American swimmer (born 1996)

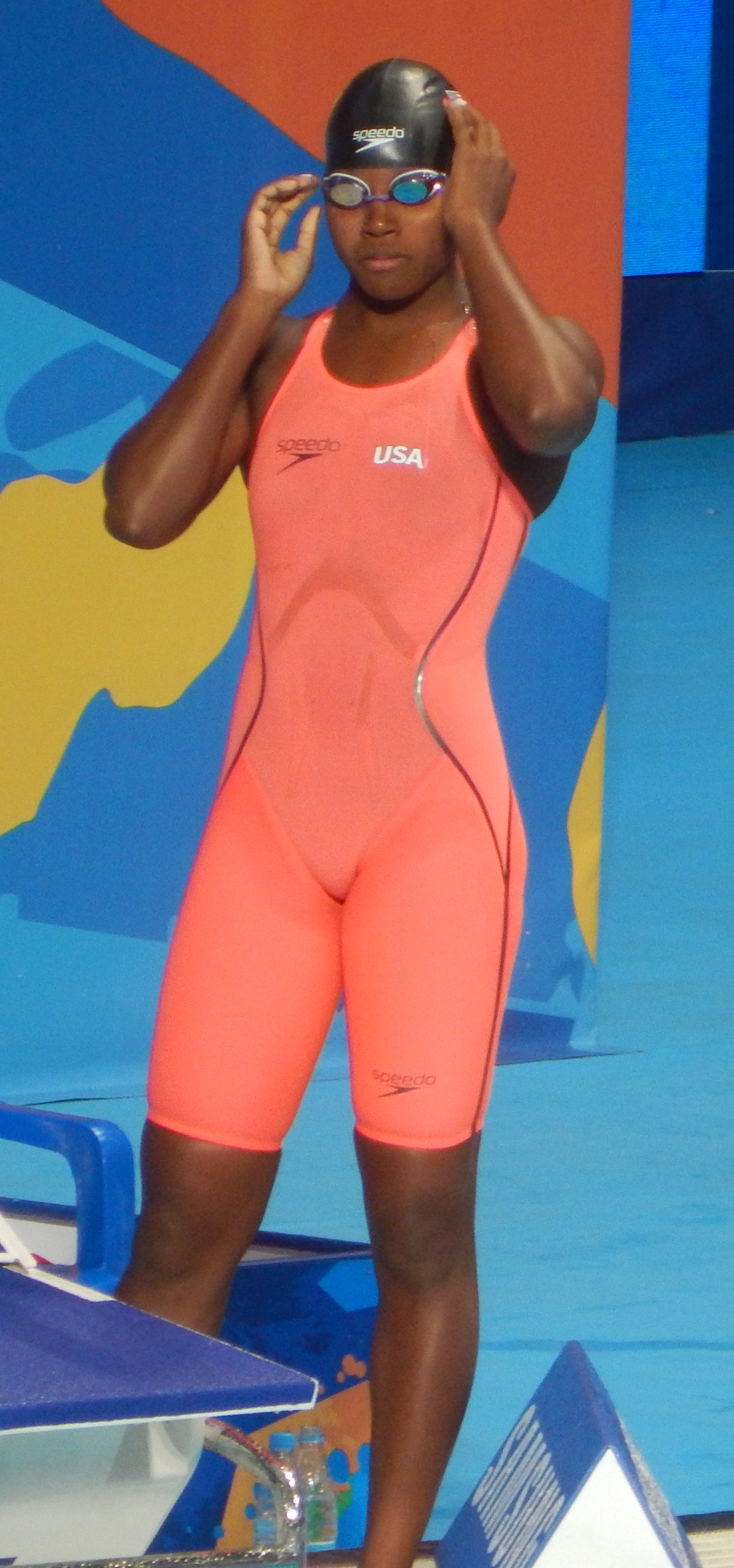
- Manuel in 2015

Personal information
- Full name: Simone Ashley Manuel
- National team: United States
- Born: August 2, 1996 (age 30) Sugar Land, Texas, U.S.
- Height: 5 ft 10 in (178 cm)
- Weight: 148 lb (67 kg)

Sport
- Sport: Swimming
- Strokes: Freestyle
- College team: Stanford University
Medal record
Women's swimming
Representing United States
Event	1st	2nd	3rd
Olympic Games	2	4	1
World Championships (LC)	13	5	2
Pan Pacific Championships	1	6	2
Total	16	15	5
Olympic Games
Gold medal – first place	2016 Rio de Janeiro	100 m freestyle
Gold medal – first place	2016 Rio de Janeiro	4×100 m medley
Silver medal – second place	2016 Rio de Janeiro	50 m freestyle
Silver medal – second place	2016 Rio de Janeiro	4×100 m freestyle
Silver medal – second place	2024 Paris	4×100 m freestyle
Silver medal – second place	2024 Paris	4×200 m freestyle
Bronze medal – third place	2020 Tokyo	4×100 m freestyle
World Championships (LC)
Gold medal – first place	2013 Barcelona	4×100 m freestyle
Gold medal – first place	2015 Kazan	4×100 m mixed freestyle
Gold medal – first place	2017 Budapest	100 m freestyle
Gold medal – first place	2017 Budapest	4×100 m freestyle
Gold medal – first place	2017 Budapest	4×100 m medley
Gold medal – first place	2017 Budapest	4×100 m mixed freestyle
Gold medal – first place	2017 Budapest	4×100 m mixed medley
Gold medal – first place	2019 Gwangju	50 m freestyle
Gold medal – first place	2019 Gwangju	100 m freestyle
Gold medal – first place	2019 Gwangju	4×100 m medley
Gold medal – first place	2019 Gwangju	4×100 m mixed freestyle
Gold medal – first place	2025 Singapore	4x100 m mixed freestyle
Gold medal – first place	2025 Singapore	4×100 m medley
Silver medal – second place	2019 Gwangju	4×100 m freestyle
Silver medal – second place	2019 Gwangju	4×200 m freestyle
Silver medal – second place	2019 Gwangju	4×100 m mixed medley
Silver medal – second place	2025 Singapore	4×100 m freestyle
Silver medal – second place	2025 Singapore	4×200 m freestyle
Bronze medal – third place	2015 Kazan	4×100 m freestyle
Bronze medal – third place	2017 Budapest	50 m freestyle
Pan Pacific Championships
Gold medal – first place	2026 Irvine	4×100 m freestyle
Silver medal – second place	2014 Gold Coast	4×100 m freestyle
Silver medal – second place	2014 Gold Coast	4×100 m medley
Silver medal – second place	2018 Tokyo	50 m freestyle
Silver medal – second place	2018 Tokyo	100 m freestyle
Silver medal – second place	2018 Tokyo	4×100 m freestyle
Silver medal – second place	2018 Tokyo	4×100 m medley
Bronze medal – third place	2014 Gold Coast	100 m freestyle
Bronze medal – third place	2018 Tokyo	4×100 m mixed medley
Junior Pan Pacific Championships
Gold medal – first place	2012 Honolulu	100 m freestyle
Gold medal – first place	2012 Honolulu	4×100 m freestyle
Gold medal – first place	2012 Honolulu	4×200 m freestyle
Gold medal – first place	2012 Honolulu	4×100 m medley

Olympics official video: 100m freestyle Olympic gold for Manuel

Simone Ashley Manuel (born August 2, 1996) is an American professional swimmer specializing in freestyle events. At the 2016 Rio Olympics, she won two gold and two silver medals: gold in the 100-meter freestyle and the 4×100-meter medley, and silver in the 50-meter freestyle and the 4×100-meter freestyle relay. In winning the 100-meter freestyle, a tie with Penny Oleksiak of Canada, Manuel became the first Black American woman to win an individual Olympic gold in swimming and set an Olympic record and an American record. At the 2020 Tokyo Olympics, she won a bronze medal as the anchor of the American 4×100-meter freestyle relay team.

Manuel also holds three world records as a member of a relay team, and she is a six-time individual NCAA Division I Women's Swimming and Diving Championships champion, becoming one of the first three African-American women to place in the top three spots in the 100-yard freestyle event in any Division I NCAA Swimming Championship. From 2014 to 2018, she attended Stanford University, where she swam for the Stanford Cardinal and helped Stanford win the NCAA team championship in women's swimming and diving in 2017 and 2018. She turned pro in July 2018.

After entering Stanford in 2014, she became a member of the Stanford Cardinal women's swimming team. She broke the school records in the 50-, 100-, and 200-yard freestyle in the same year, and in 2014, her freshman year, she also broke the American and National Collegiate Athletic Association (NCAA) records for 100-yard freestyle. Manuel is a six-time individual NCAA champion: winning the 50- and 100-yard freestyle in 2015, 2017, and 2018. She redshirted in 2016. As a senior, she won the Honda Sports Award as the nation's best female swimmer as well as the Honda Cup for the best overall female collegiate athlete.

== Swimming career ==
=== 2012 ===
Manuel swam at the 2012 United States Olympic Trials, placing 20th in the 50-meter freestyle and 17th in the 100-meter freestyle events. The following month, as a 16-year-old at the 2012 Junior Pan Pacific Swimming Championships, held at the Veterans Memorial Aquatic Center in Honolulu, she won gold medals in the 100-meter freestyle with a time of 54.80 seconds, the 4×100-meter freestyle relay where she set a Championships record of 54.60 on the first leg of the relay, the 4×200-meter freestyle relay, the 4×100-meter medley relay, placed fourth in the 50-meter freestyle with a time of 25.45 seconds, and won the B-final of the 200-meter freestyle with a 2:00.32.

=== 2013 ===
==== 2013 National Championships ====
She competed at the 2013 US National Championships, where she finished third in the 100-meter freestyle and second in the 50-meter freestyle events.

==== 2013 World Championships ====
2013 World Championships
Gold medal – first place	4×100 m freestyle relay	3:32.31

She qualified for the 2013 World Aquatics Championships in Barcelona, and she won a gold medal in the preliminary for the 4×100-meter freestyle relay.

==== 2013 Duel in the Pool ====
She also competed in the 2013 Duel in the Pool, where she won first in the 100-meter freestyle, third in the 50-meter freestyle, second in the 400-meter freestyle relay, and first in the 200-meter mixed medley relay.

=== 2014 ===
At the 2014 US National Championships, she finished first in the 50-meter freestyle, second in the 100-meter freestyle, and seventh in the 200-meter freestyle. She competed in that year's Pan Pacific Swimming Championships, where she won bronze in the 100-meter freestyle, silver in the 4×100-meter freestyle and 4×100 medley relays, and placed fourth in the 50-meter freestyle.

=== 2015 ===
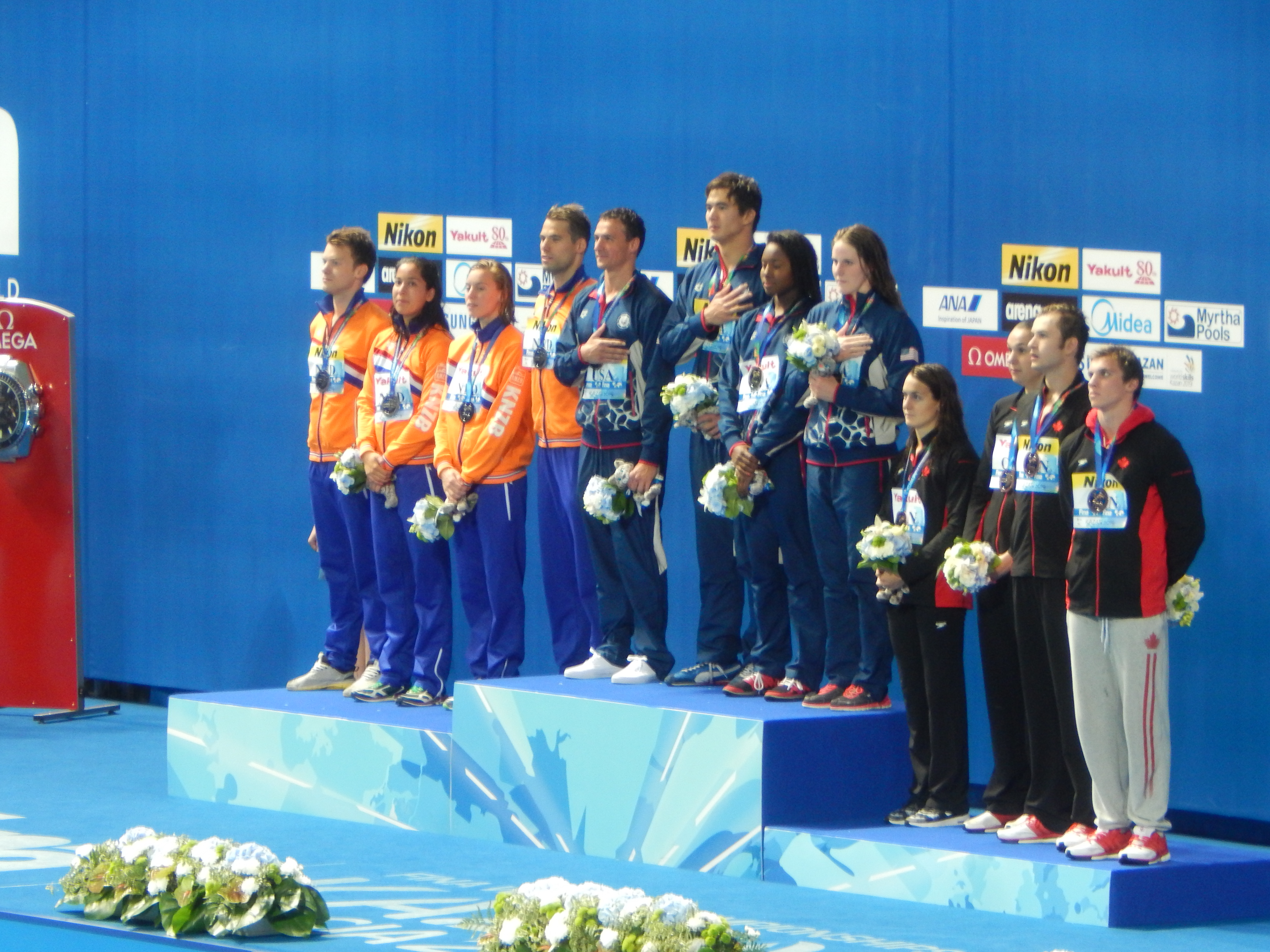
Lochte, Adrian, Manuel, and Franklin (center, left to right) together hold the mixed 4 × 100 m freestyle relay world record.

In 2015, Manuel won her first two individual NCAA championships, winning the 50- and 100-yard freestyle, setting an NCAA, American, U.S. Open, Championship, and Pool record in 100-yard freestyle with a time of 46.09. She also placed second in the 200-yard freestyle event. She became one of the first three African-American women to place in the top three spots in the 100-yard freestyle event in any Division I NCAA Swimming Championship. She competed in the 2015 World Aquatics Championships, placing fourth in the 4×100 medley relay, sixth in the 100-meter freestyle, and eighth in the 50-meter freestyle.

=== 2016 Summer Olympics ===
2016 Olympics
Gold medal – first place	100 m freestyle	52.70 (AR)
Gold medal – first place	4×100 m medley	3:53.13
Silver medal – second place	4×100 m freestyle relay	3:31.89 (AR)
Silver medal – second place	50 m freestyle	24.09

Manuel swam in the 2016 United States Olympic Trials, placing second in the 50- and 100-meter freestyle and seventh in the 200-meter freestyle. Her position in the 50- and 100-meter events qualified her to compete at the 2016 Summer Olympics in Rio de Janeiro.

She won a silver medal as part of the 4×100-meter freestyle relay along with Abbey Weitzeil, Dana Vollmer, and Katie Ledecky. She tied with Penny Oleksiak of Canada for the gold medal in the 100 m freestyle, both setting an Olympic record of 52.70. Manuel is the first African-American woman to win a gold medal in an individual swimming event and is also said to be the first black woman to achieve this. She later won silver in the 50-meter freestyle event and gold in the 4×100-meter medley relay.

=== 2017 World Championships ===
2017 World Championships
Gold medal – first place	100 m freestyle	52.27 (AR)
Gold medal – first place	4×100 m freestyle	3:31.72 (AR)
Gold medal – first place	4×100 m medley	3:51.55 (WR)
Gold medal – first place	4×100 m mixed medley	3:38.56 (WR)
Gold medal – first place	4×100 m mixed freestyle	3:19.60 (WR)
Bronze medal – third place	50 m freestyle	23.97 (AR)

At the 2017 US Nationals, the qualification meet for the World Championships in Budapest, Manuel won the 50-meter freestyle with a time of 24.27 and touched second in the 100-meter freestyle with a time of 53.05.

On the first day of the World Championships, Manuel anchored the women's 4×100-meter freestyle relay to a gold medal alongside Mallory Comerford, Kelsi Worrell, and Ledecky. She split a very fast 52.14 to anchor the team to a new American record time of 3:31.72. Manuel picked up her second gold of the meet when she anchored the mixed 4×100-meter medley relay with a split of 52.17. Together with Matt Grevers, Lilly King, and Caeleb Dressel, the team broke the world record in a time of 3:38.56. Manuel's first individual event of the meet was the 100-meter freestyle, where Swedish swimmer Sarah Sjöström was widely considered the favorite to win since she had broken the world record while leading off the 4×100-meter freestyle relay on the first night of the World Championships. In similar fashion to the previous summer at the Olympics, Manuel upset the favorite by coming from behind to win the 100-meter freestyle with an American record time of 52.27, out touching Sjöström by just four-hundredths of a second. The day after, she won her fourth gold medal in the mixed 4×00-meter freestyle relay, where she split 52.18 on the anchoring leg. Alongside Comerford, Dressel, and Nathan Adrian, they set a world record of 3:19.60. On the last night of the meet, Manuel swam the finals of both the 50-meter freestyle and the women's 4×100-meter medley relay. Touching in a bronze-winning time of 23.97, she set the American record and became the first American woman to break the 24-second barrier in the 50-meter freestyle. Manuel then anchored the women's 4×100-meter medley relay to a winning time of 3:51.55. The team of Kathleen Baker, King, Worrell, and Manuel broke the 2012 world record of 3:52.05 set by Missy Franklin, Rebecca Soni, Dana Vollmer, and Allison Schmitt.

=== 2019 World Championships ===
2019 World Championships
Gold medal – first place	50 m freestyle	24.05
Gold medal – first place	100 m freestyle	52.04 (AR)
Gold medal – first place	4×100 m medley	3:50.40 (WR)
Gold medal – first place	4×100 m mixed freestyle	3:19.40 (WR)
Silver medal – second place	4×100 m freestyle	3:31.02 (AR)
Silver medal – second place	4×200 m freestyle	7:41.87 (AR)
Silver medal – second place	4×100 m mixed medley	3:39.10

At the 2019 World Aquatics Championships in Gwangju, South Korea in July 2019, Manuel became the first female American swimmer to win both the 50-meter freestyle and 100-meter freestyle events at a single FINA long course World Aquatics Championships meet. Manuel won a total of seven medals, four gold and three silver medals, at the 2019 World Aquatics Championships. This was most won by any female in the sport of swimming at a single FINA World Aquatics Championships series meet conducted in long course meters. In the 50-meter freestyle, 100-meter freestyle, 4×100-meter medley relay, and 4×100-meter mixed freestyle relay she won gold. She won silver in the 4×100-meter freestyle relay, 4x200-meter freestyle relay, and 4×100-meter mixed medley relay.

Manuel's accomplishments were highlighted by USA Swimming and she was the recipient of the 2019 "Female Athlete of the Year" award at the 2019 Golden Goggles Awards.

=== 2021 ===
==== 2020 US Olympic Trials ====
At the 2020 USA Swimming Olympic Trials, postponed to June 2021 due to the COVID-19 pandemic, Manuel competed in the 100-meter freestyle and the 50-meter freestyle. In the 100-meter freestyle, she ranked 9th in the semifinals and did not qualify for the final. She attributed her performance to overtraining syndrome. In the 50-meter freestyle, Manuel ranked first in the final with a time of 24.29, qualifying for the US Olympic swim team in the 50-meter freestyle at the 2020 Summer Olympics.

==== 2020 Summer Olympics ====
2020 Olympics
Bronze medal – third place	4×100 m freestyle relay	3:32.81

The 2020 Summer Olympics in Tokyo, Japan were the second Olympic Games Manuel qualified to compete in. She was selected as one of three first time captains, Allison Schmitt was selected as the only second time captain, along with Ryan Murphy and Caeleb Dressel for the USA Olympic swim team.

While Manuel did not qualify to swim in the 4×100-meter freestyle relay at the 2020 US Olympic Trials, Team USA coach Greg Meehan decided to put her on the relay in the finals of the event at the 2020 Olympic Games in place of some of the relay-only swimmers who qualified at the US Olympic Trials and had already swum in the prelims. Manuel was entered as the anchor, fourth, swimmer for the relay. In the final, Manuel helped the relay finish in third place with a time of 3:32.81 and won her first medal of the 2020 Olympics, a bronze medal in the 4×100-meter freestyle relay.

On day seven of competition, Manuel swam a 24.65 in the prelims heats of the 50-meter freestyle and advanced to the semifinals ranked 11th overall. On day eight, in the semifinals of the 50-meter freestyle, Manuel finished with a time of 24.63, ranked 11th overall, and did not advance to the final of the event.

=== Sponsorships ===
Manuel turned to full-time professional swimming in July 2018, forgoing her final collegiate season with Stanford. On July 24, 2018, she signed with TYR Sport, Inc., joining former Stanford teammates Katie Ledecky and Lia Neal. Another one of Manuel's sponsors during the 2020 Summer Olympics was automotive manufacturer Toyota.

== Activism and outreach ==
=== Efforts to increase access, diversity, and inclusion in swimming ===
==== Make A Splash Foundation ====
Manuel has partnered with multiple organizations and projects whose goal is to extend opportunities and promote inclusion in swimming. She is an ambassador for the Make A Splash organization headed by the USA Swimming Foundation. This program partners with local communities to bring awareness to the need for aquatics education in underserved areas by issuing grants to local swim lesson providers. The program teaches the life-saving skills of swimming and pool safety to young children from under-resourced communities often free of charge.

==== Inclusion rider ====
Manuel signed a sponsorship with the popular swimwear company TYR Sport, Inc. in 2018 and entered the world of professional swimming. In signing her sponsorship with TYR Sport, Inc., Manuel instituted an inclusion rider in her contract. The addition, often seen in the entertainment industry to require groups to reach a specific level of diversity, was a first ever agreement of its kind in professional sports. In TYR Sport, Inc.'s press release regarding the signing of Manuel, the company describes that the inclusion rider "ensures that [Simone's] partners [or TYR] extend meaningful opportunities to traditionally underrepresented groups and that diversity be reflected in the creative efforts [Simone] pursues with the brand".

==== Promise School ====
In 2019 Manuel partnered with LeBron James' Promise School in Akron, Ohio. With this partnership, she helped form a 4-week summer swim program for students of the school. The program was hosted by the Akron YMCA that provided the swim instructors and assisted in funding the program. Out of 140 attendees, 90% had no experience in the pool. Although Manuel could not be physically present at the camp because she was training for the Olympics, she did visit the school earlier that year in March to introduce the summer program and have a meet and greet with the kids. For the duration of the camp, Manuel sent videos giving tips and encouragement to the students. In agreement with her inclusion rider, her sponsor TYR provided the children with swimsuits and other swim gear necessary for the camp.

== Career best times ==
As of August 1, 2017

Long course (50 m pool)
Event	Time	City	Date	Notes	Ref
50 m freestyle	23.97	Budapest, Hungary	July 30, 2017	Former NR, AM	
100 m freestyle	52.04	Gwangju, South Korea	July 26, 2019	NR, AM	
200 m freestyle	1:56.09	Gwangju, South Korea	July 25, 2019		
50 m freestyle (SC)	24.07	Indianapolis, U.S.	December 12, 2015		
100 m freestyle (SC)	51.69	Indianapolis, U.S.	December 11, 2015		
50 yd freestyle (SC)	21.17		March 16, 2017		
100 yd freestyle (SC)	45.56		March 18, 2017	NR	

NR – National Record
AM – Americas Record

== World records ==
Distance	Event	Time	Location	Date	Ref
4 x 50 m	Mixed medley relay^{[a]}	1:37.17	Glasgow, Scotland	December 21, 2013	
4 × 100 m	Mixed freestyle relay^{[b]}	3:23.05	Kazan, Russia	August 8, 2015	
4 × 100 m	Women's medley relay (sc)^{[c]}	3:45.20	Indianapolis, U.S.	December 11, 2015	
4 × 100 m	Mixed medley relay^{[d]}	3:38.56	Budapest, Hungary	July 27, 2017	
4 × 100 m	Mixed freestyle relay^{[e]}	3:19.60	Budapest, Hungary	July 29, 2017	
4 × 100 m	Women's medley relay^{[f]}	3:51.55	Budapest, Hungary	July 30, 2017	
4 x 100 m	Mixed freestyle relay^{[g]}	3:19.40	Gwangju, South Korea	July 27, 2019	

^{a} with Eugene Godsoe, Kevin Cordes, and Claire Donahue
^{b} with Ryan Lochte, Nathan Adrian, and Missy Franklin
^{c} short course record with Courtney Bartholomew, Katie Meili, and Kelsi Worrell
^{d} with Matt Grevers, Lilly King, and Caeleb Dressel
^{e} with Caeleb Dressel, Nathan Adrian, and Mallory Comerford
^{f} with Kathleen Baker, Lilly King, and Kelsi Worrell
^{g} with Caeleb Dressel, Zach Apple, and Mallory Comerford

== Awards and honors ==
- Forbes, 30 Under 30 in sports: 2022
- Honda Sports Award (Swimming & Diving): 2017–2018
- Honda Cup, Collegiate Woman Athlete of the Year (Swimming & Diving): 2017–2018
- Golden Goggle Award, Female Athlete of the Year: 2019
- SwimSwam Swammy Award, US Swimmer of the Year (female): 2019
- Golden Goggle Award, Female Race of the Year: 2016
- Golden Goggle Award, Relay Performance of the Year: 2017, 2019
- SwimSwam Top 100 (Women's): 2021 (#5)

== See also ==
- List of world records in swimming
- List of multiple Olympic gold medalists at a single Games
- List of Olympic medalists in swimming (women)
- List of Americas records in swimming
- List of people from Texas
- Diversity in swimming
