= Lia Neal =

American swimmer (born 1995)

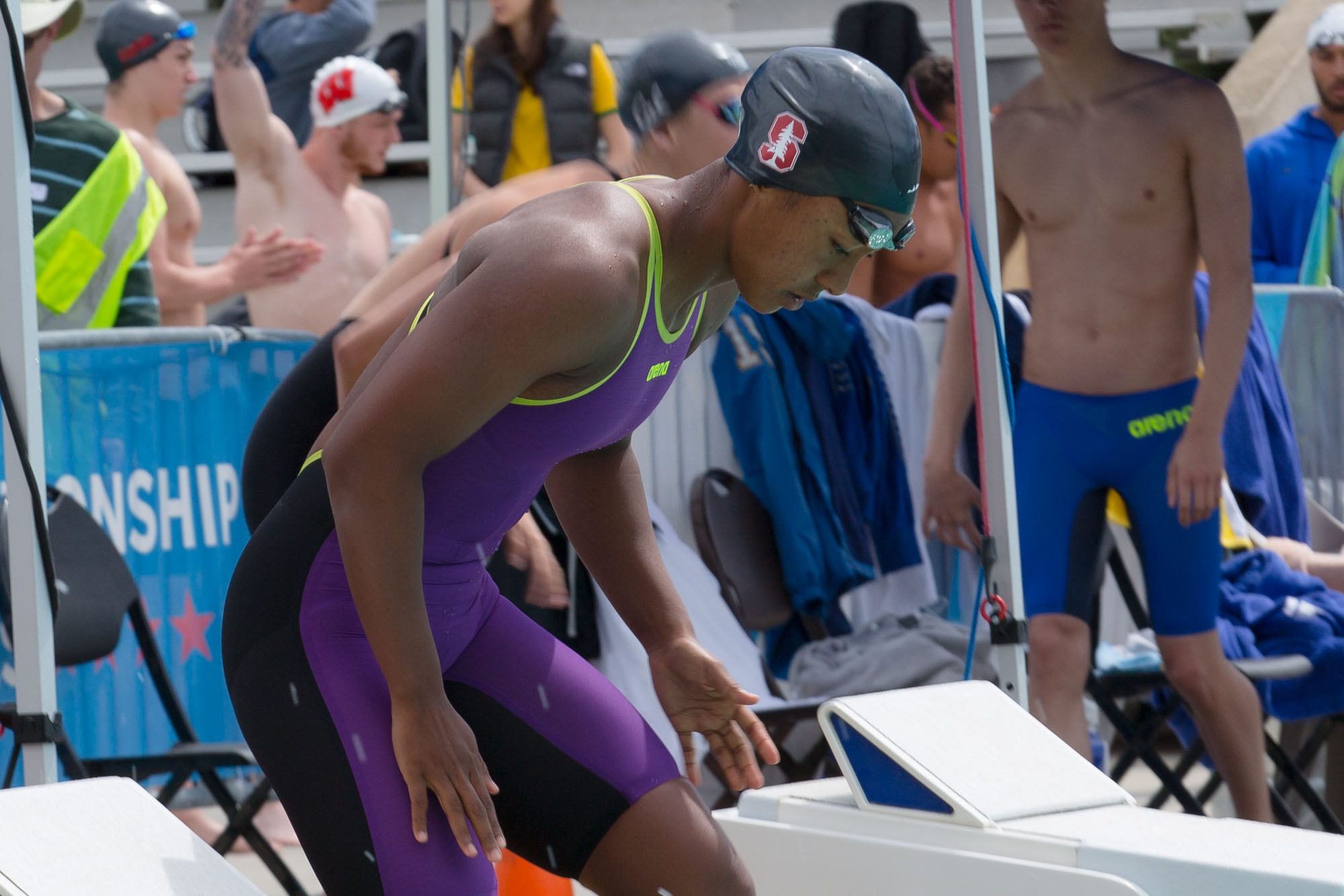

Personal information
- National team: United States
- Born: February 13, 1995 (age 31) Brooklyn, New York, U.S.
- Height: 5 ft 10 in (178 cm)

Sport
- Sport: Swimming
- Strokes: Freestyle
- Club: Asphalt Green Unified Aquatics (Eastside)
- College team: Stanford University
Medal record
Women's swimming
Representing the United States
Olympic Games
Silver medal – second place	2016 Rio de Janeiro	4×100 m freestyle
Bronze medal – third place	2012 London	4×100 m freestyle
World Championships (LC)
Gold medal – first place	2017 Budapest	4×100 m freestyle
Gold medal – first place	2017 Budapest	4×100 m mixed freestyle
Silver medal – second place	2015 Kazan	4×100 m mixed medley
Silver medal – second place	2019 Gwangju	4×100 m freestyle
Bronze medal – third place	2015 Kazan	4×100 m freestyle
World Championships (SC)
Gold medal – first place	2012 Istanbul	4×100 m freestyle
Gold medal – first place	2018 Hangzhou	4×50 m freestyle
Gold medal – first place	2018 Hangzhou	4×100 m freestyle
Gold medal – first place	2018 Hangzhou	4×100 m medley
Silver medal – second place	2018 Hangzhou	4×200 m freestyle
Bronze medal – third place	2012 Istanbul	4×100 m medley
Pan American Games
Gold medal – first place	2019 Lima	4×100 m freestyle
Gold medal – first place	2019 Lima	4×100 m medley
Summer Universiade
Gold medal – first place	2015 Gwangju	4×100 m freestyle

Lia Neal (born February 13, 1995) is an American former professional swimmer who specialized in freestyle events. In her Olympic debut at the 2012 Summer Olympics in London, she won a bronze medal in the 4×100-meter freestyle relay. In 2016, she won a silver medal in the same event at Rio de Janeiro. She was the second female African-American swimmer to make a U.S. Olympic team.

== Early life ==
Lia Neal was born in Brooklyn, New York in 1995, the daughter of Siu and Jerome Neal. Lia Neal is of African and Chinese descent. She started swimming when she was six years old in New York City. She attended the Convent of the Sacred Heart School in New York City, where she was a member of the club swim team, Asphalt Green Unified Aquatics.

== Career ==
=== 2008 US Olympic Trials ===
Neal competed at the 2008 US Olympic Trials in swimming in Omaha, Nebraska from June to July 2008 when she was 13 years old. She ranked 28th in the 50-meter freestyle and 78th in the 100-meter freestyle.

=== 2012 ===
==== 2012 US Olympic Trials ====
At the 2012 United States Olympic Trials in Omaha, Nebraska, the U.S. qualifying meet for the Olympics, Neal made the U.S. Olympic team by finishing fourth in the 100-meter freestyle with a time of 54.33 seconds, which qualified her to swim in the 4×100-meter freestyle relay.

Neal was 17 years old when she became the second female African-American swimmer to qualify for a U.S. Olympic swimming team. She was also highlighted for the geographical diversity she brought to the U.S. Olympic swimming team as she was not from a warm-weather state, such as Florida or California, where U.S. Olympic swimmers typically come from.

==== 2012 Summer Olympics ====
2012 Summer Olympics
Bronze medal – third place	4x100 m freestyle relay	3:34.24

At the 2012 Summer Olympics in London, Neal won a bronze medal in the 4×100-meter freestyle relay with Missy Franklin, Jessica Hardy and Allison Schmitt, with the U.S. team finishing third behind the teams from Australia and the Netherlands. Swimming the third leg, Neal had a split of 53.65 seconds and the U.S. team finished with a total time of 3:34.24, an American record. Neal was chosen to swim in the final based on her performance in the heats of the 4×100-meter freestyle. Swimming the lead-off leg in the heats, Neal posted a time of 54.15.

Neal made history with fellow African-American swimmers Anthony Ervin and Cullen Jones by being the first three African-Americans on a US Olympic swim team with more than one African-American swimmer. She was also a senior in high school and the first student from the Convent of the Sacred Heart since its founding in 1881 to compete in an Olympic Games.

=== 2015 ===
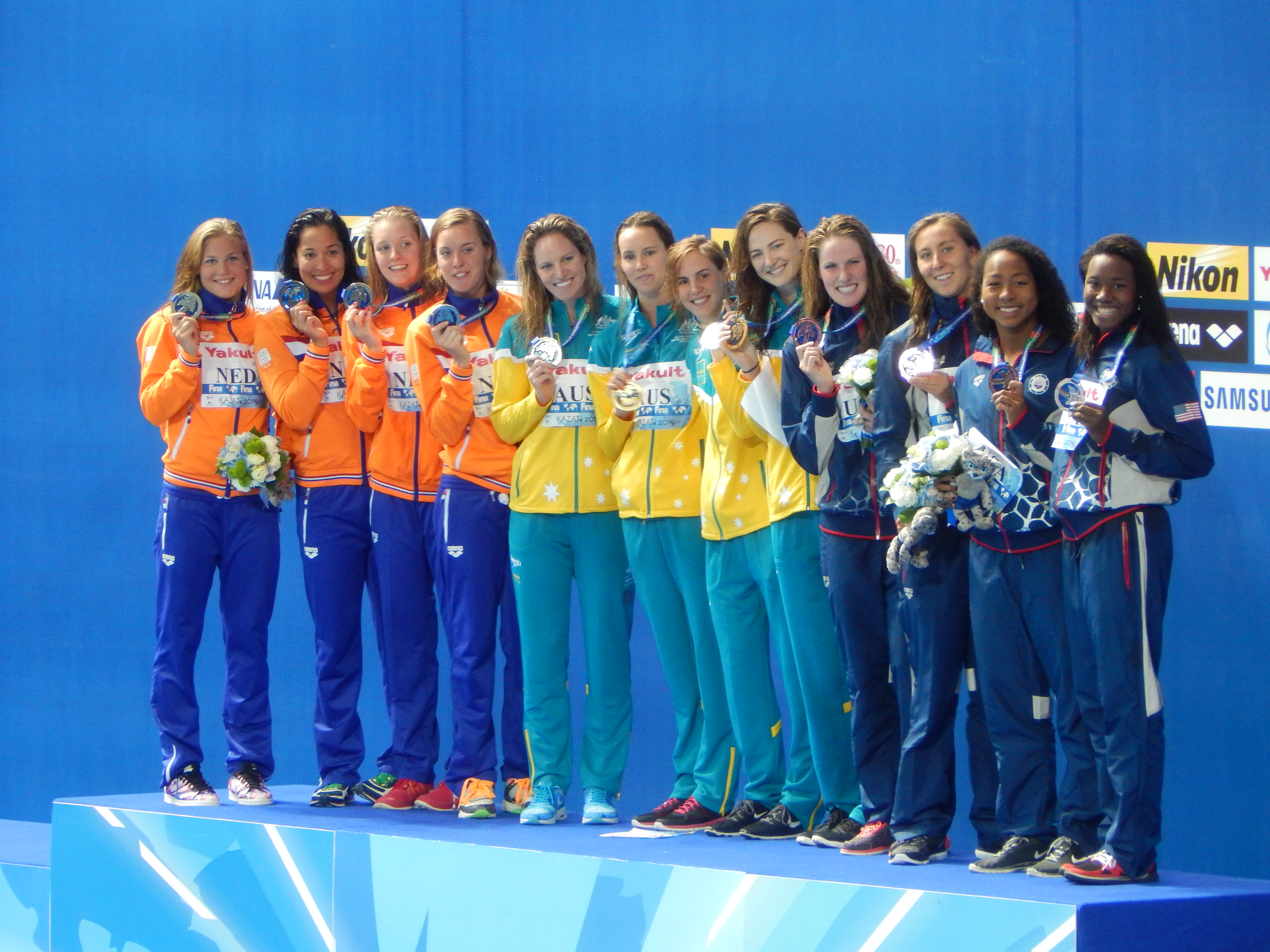
Lia Neal (second from right) with her 4x100-meter freestyle relay teammates in Kazan in 2015.

In 2015, Neal became one of the first three African-American swimmers to place in the top three spots at the 100-yard freestyle in any Women’s Division I NCAA Swimming Championship; Simone Manuel was first, Neal was second and Natalie Hinds was third.

=== 2016 Summer Olympics ===
2016 Summer Olympics
Silver medal – second place	4x100 m freestyle relay	3:31.89

In 2016 at Rio de Janeiro, Brazil, Neal won a silver medal at the Olympic Games in the Women's 4 × 100 m freestyle relay, swimming in the preliminary heats of the race.

=== 2017 ===
From 2013 to 2017, Neal competed collegiately for Stanford University where she was an 8-time NCAA champion.

=== 2019 World Championships ===
2019 World Championships
Silver medal – second place	4x100 m freestyle relay	3:31.02

In July 2019 at the 2019 World Aquatics Championships in Gwangju, South Korea, Lia Neal anchored the 4x100-meter freestyle relay swimming a 54.41 and winning a silver medal in the finals.

=== 2020 ===
In April 2020 Neal shared a bit about herself and her efforts to widen the perspective of swimmers, including herself, outside the pool via a SwimSwam podcast. One of the ways she has worked to make the swimming community more visible and approachable to those outside the swimming community is through her YouTube channel. She started the channel on August 19, 2016, and began uploading videos related to the diversification of perceptions of swimmers in March 2020 when she announced she was becoming a YouTuber.

=== 2021: Retirement from competitive swimming ===
In May 2021, Neal announced her retirement from the sport of swimming.

== Personal life ==
Neal is Catholic, having been baptized at Sacred Heart Church in Brooklyn.

=== Sponsorships ===
TYR Sport, Inc. signed Neal in 2017 as a sponsor of her professional swimming career. She earned an MBA from Harvard Business School.

== See also ==
- List of Olympic medalists in swimming (women)
- World record progression 4 × 100 metres freestyle relay
- List of people from New York (state)
- List of people from New York City
- List of people from Brooklyn
- Diversity in swimming
