= Swimming at the 2015 World Aquatics Championships – Women's 100 metre breaststroke =

Women's 100 metre breaststroke at the 2015 World Aquatics Championships
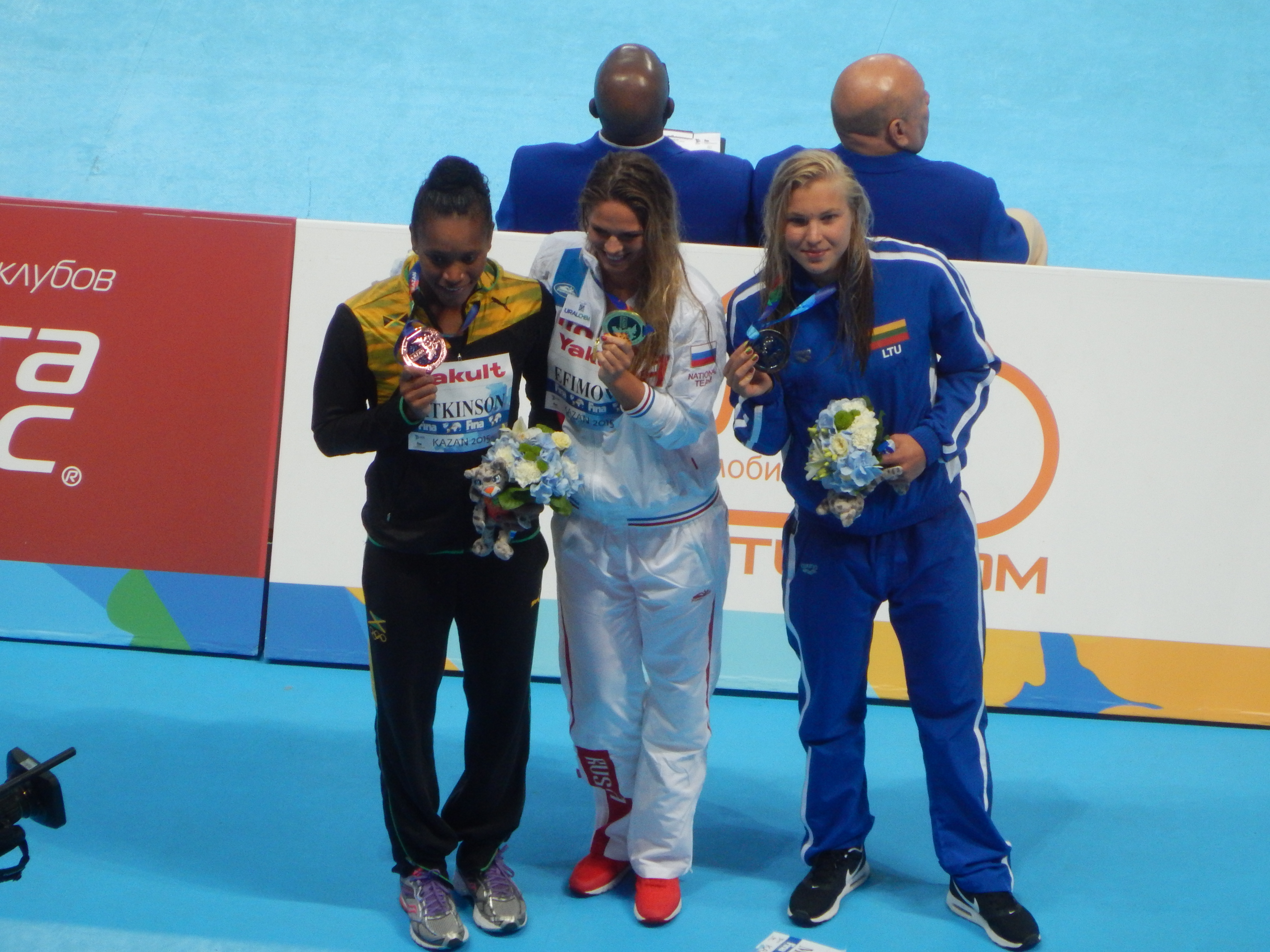
- Medallists
- Dates: 3 August (heats and semifinals); 4 August (final)
- Competitors: 70 from 61 nations
- Winning time: 1:05.66

Medalists
gold medal	Yuliya Yefimova	Russia
silver medal	Rūta Meilutytė	Lithuania
bronze medal	Alia Atkinson	Jamaica

The Women's 100 metre breaststroke competition of the swimming events at the 2015 World Aquatics Championships was held on 3 August with the heats and the semifinals and 4 August with the final.

== Records ==
Prior to the competition, the existing world and championship records were as follows.

World record	Rūta Meilutytė (LTU)	1:04.35	Barcelona, Spain	29 July 2013
Competition record	Rūta Meilutytė (LTU)	1:04.35	Barcelona, Spain	29 July 2013

== Results ==
=== Heats ===
The heats were held on 3 August at 10:07.

Rank	Heat	Lane	Name	Nationality	Time	Notes
1	6	4	Yuliya Yefimova	Russia	1:06.31	Q
2	6	3	Shi Jinglin	China	1:06.45	Q
3	6	5	Jessica Hardy	United States	1:06.68	Q
4	7	4	Rūta Meilutytė	Lithuania	1:06.75	Q
5	7	5	Kanako Watanabe	Japan	1:06.81	Q
6	7	9	Hrafnhildur Lúthersdóttir	Iceland	1:06.87	Q, NR
7	7	6	Taylor McKeown	Australia	1:06.97	Q
8	5	3	Jennie Johansson	Sweden	1:07.09	Q
8	7	3	Alia Atkinson	Jamaica	1:07.09	Q
10	5	2	Jessica Vall	Spain	1:07.13	Q
11	6	8	Fanny Lecluyse	Belgium	1:07.29	Q, NR
12	6	2	Lorna Tonks	Australia	1:07.32	Q
13	5	4	Rikke Møller Pedersen	Denmark	1:07.39	Q
14	5	9	Rachel Nicol	Canada	1:07.52	Q
14	6	6	Arianna Castiglioni	Italy	1:07.52	Q
16	5	8	Jenna Laukkanen	Finland	1:07.58	Q, NR
17	6	7	Viktoriya Zeynep Gunes	Turkey	1:07.60	
18	7	7	Rie Kaneto	Japan	1:07.71	
19	5	5	Micah Lawrence	United States	1:07.73	
20	5	6	Fiona Doyle	Ireland	1:07.81	
21	4	5	Kierra Smith	Canada	1:07.88	
22	5	1	Marina García Urzainqui	Spain	1:07.97	
23	6	9	Vanessa Grimberg	Germany	1:08.04	
24	7	1	Petra Chocová	Czech Republic	1:08.09	
25	6	1	Ilaria Scarcella	Italy	1:08.13	
26	5	7	Maria Astashkina	Russia	1:08.27	
26	7	2	Moniek Nijhuis	Netherlands	1:08.27	
28	7	8	Amit Ivry	Israel	1:09.08	
29	7	0	Mariya Liver	Ukraine	1:09.10	
30	5	0	He Yun	China	1:09.17	
31	6	0	Tjaša Vozel	Slovenia	1:09.27	
32	4	3	Anna Sztankovics	Hungary	1:09.34	
33	4	8	Dominika Sztandera	Poland	1:09.38	
34	3	9	Maria Romanjuk	Estonia	1:09.49	NR
35	4	2	Julia Sebastian	Argentina	1:09.71	
36	4	6	Jhennifer Conceição	Brazil	1:10.14	
37	4	7	Jung Seul-ki	South Korea	1:10.19	
38	3	5	Aikaterini Sarakatsani	Greece	1:10.68	
39	3	1	Mercedes Toledo	Venezuela	1:10.70	
39	4	1	Fanny Deberghes	France	1:10.70	
41	4	9	Ana Radić	Croatia	1:10.83	
42	2	4	Daniela Carrillo	Mexico	1:11.22	
43	4	0	Alina Zmushka	Belarus	1:11.39	
44	3	4	Aļona Ribakova	Latvia	1:11.45	
45	3	7	Yvette Kong	Hong Kong	1:11.46	
46	3	2	Phee Jinq En	Malaysia	1:11.76	
47	3	0	Daniela Lindemeier	Namibia	1:12.07	
48	4	4	Anastasiya Malyavina	Ukraine	1:12.77	
49	3	6	Dariya Talanova	Kyrgyzstan	1:13.68	
50	3	8	Alexandra Vinicenco	Moldova	1:13.88	
51	3	3	Sin Jin-hui	North Korea	1:14.52	
52	2	5	Lei On Kei	Macau	1:15.17	
53	2	7	Amy Micallef	Malta	1:16.02	
54	2	0	Barbara Vali-Skelton	Papua New Guinea	1:16.85	
55	2	8	Tilka Paljk	Zambia	1:17.13	
56	2	3	Jamila Lunkuse	Uganda	1:17.23	
57	2	2	Evita Leter	Suriname	1:17.97	
58	2	1	Pilar Shimizu	Guam	1:18.11	
59	2	6	Izzy Joachim	Saint Vincent and the Grenadines	1:18.28	
60	2	9	Teona Bostashvili	Georgia	1:19.53	
61	1	3	Claudia Verdino	Monaco	1:19.85	
62	1	2	Bonita Imsirovic	Botswana	1:20.81	
63	1	5	Oreoluwa Cherebin	Grenada	1:21.06	
64	1	4	Rechael Tonjor	Nigeria	1:21.54	
65	1	7	Darya Semyonova	Turkmenistan	1:23.19	
66	1	6	Anum Bandey	Pakistan	1:25.11	
67	1	1	Alphonsine Agahozo	Rwanda	1:27.80	
68	1	0	Daniah Hagul	Libya	1:28.59	
69	1	8	Sajina Aishath	Maldives	1:32.10	
	1	9	Alia Al-Shamsi	United Arab Emirates	DSQ	

=== Semifinals ===
The semifinals were held on 3 August at 17:58.

==== Semifinal 1 ====
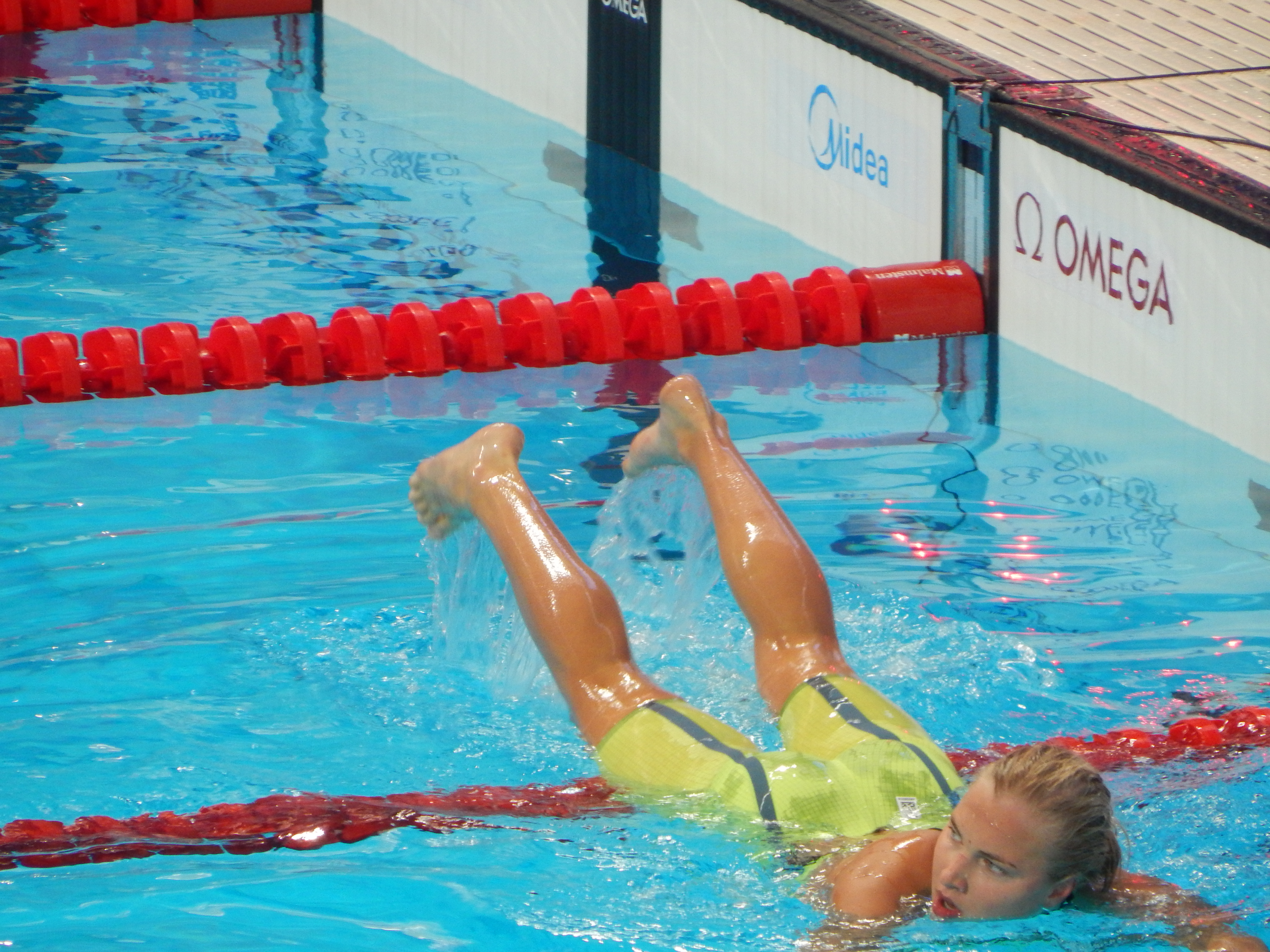
Rūta Meilutytė after her semi

Rank	Lane	Name	Nationality	Time	Notes
1	5	Rūta Meilutytė	Lithuania	1:05.64	Q
2	4	Shi Jinglin	China	1:06.28	Q
3	6	Jennie Johansson	Sweden	1:06.76	Q
4	3	Hrafnhildur Lúthersdóttir	Iceland	1:07.11	Q
5	1	Rachel Nicol	Canada	1:07.24	
6	7	Lorna Tonks	Australia	1:07.54	
7	8	Jenna Laukkanen	Finland	1:07.60	
8	2	Jessica Vall	Spain	1:08.02	

==== Semifinal 2 ====
Rank	Lane	Name	Nationality	Time	Notes
1	4	Yuliya Yefimova	Russia	1:05.60	Q
2	2	Alia Atkinson	Jamaica	1:06.21	Q, NR
3	3	Kanako Watanabe	Japan	1:06.64	Q
4	8	Arianna Castiglioni	Italy	1:06.95	Q
5	6	Taylor McKeown	Australia	1:07.19	
6	5	Jessica Hardy	United States	1:07.22	
7	1	Rikke Møller Pedersen	Denmark	1:07.42	
8	7	Fanny Lecluyse	Belgium	1:07.75	

=== Final ===
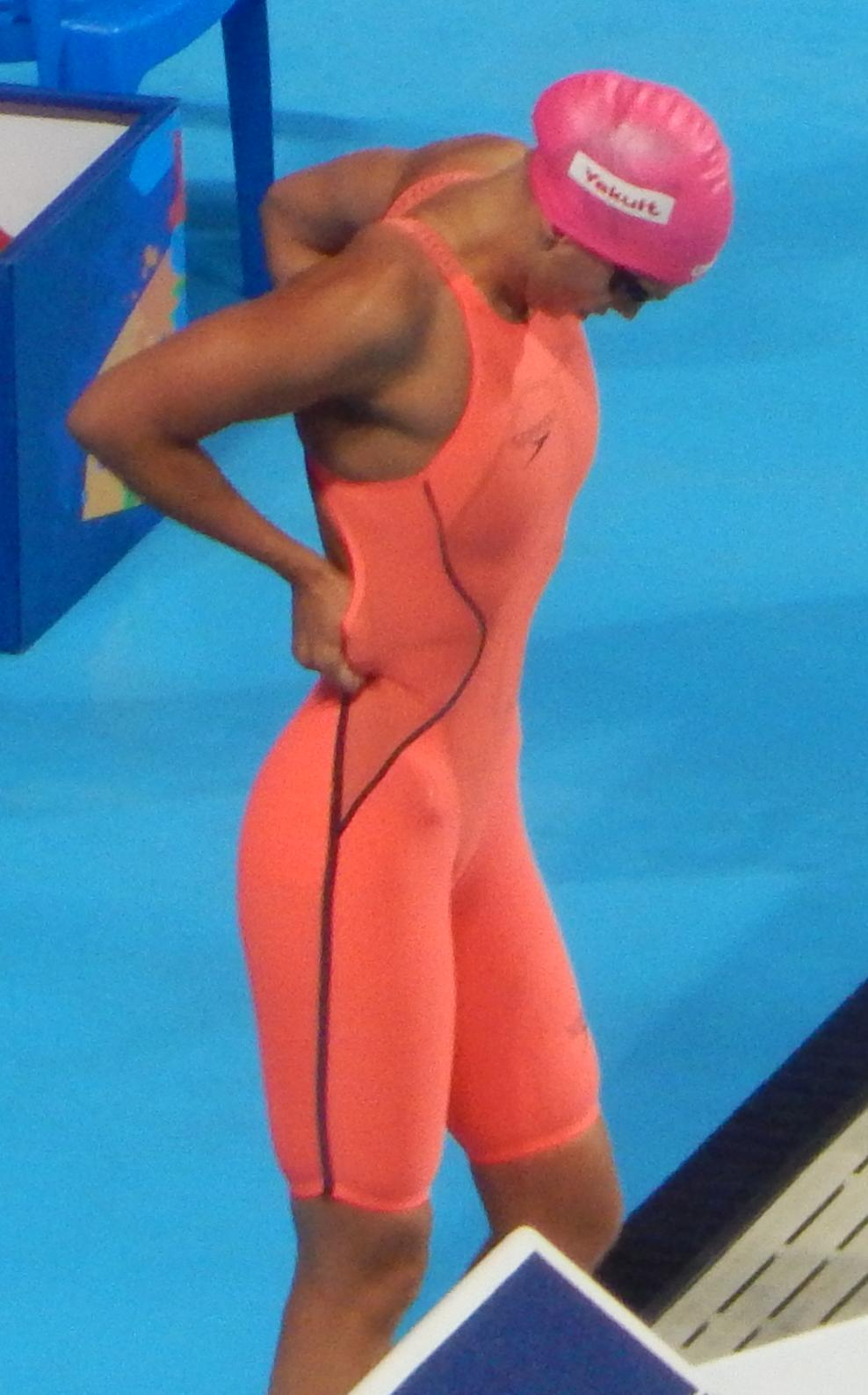
Efimova before final heat

The final was held on 4 August at 19:17.

Rank	Lane	Name	Nationality	Time	Notes
1st place, gold medalist(s)	4	Yuliya Yefimova	Russia	1:05.66	
2nd place, silver medalist(s)	5	Rūta Meilutytė	Lithuania	1:06.36	
3rd place, bronze medalist(s)	3	Alia Atkinson	Jamaica	1:06.42	
4	2	Kanako Watanabe	Japan	1:06.43	
5	6	Shi Jinglin	China	1:06.55	
6	8	Hrafnhildur Lúthersdóttir	Iceland	1:07.10	
7	7	Jennie Johansson	Sweden	1:07.17	
8	1	Arianna Castiglioni	Italy	1:07.60	
