= Swimming at the 2015 World Aquatics Championships – Women's 50 metre breaststroke =

Women's 50 metre breaststroke at the 2015 World Aquatics Championships
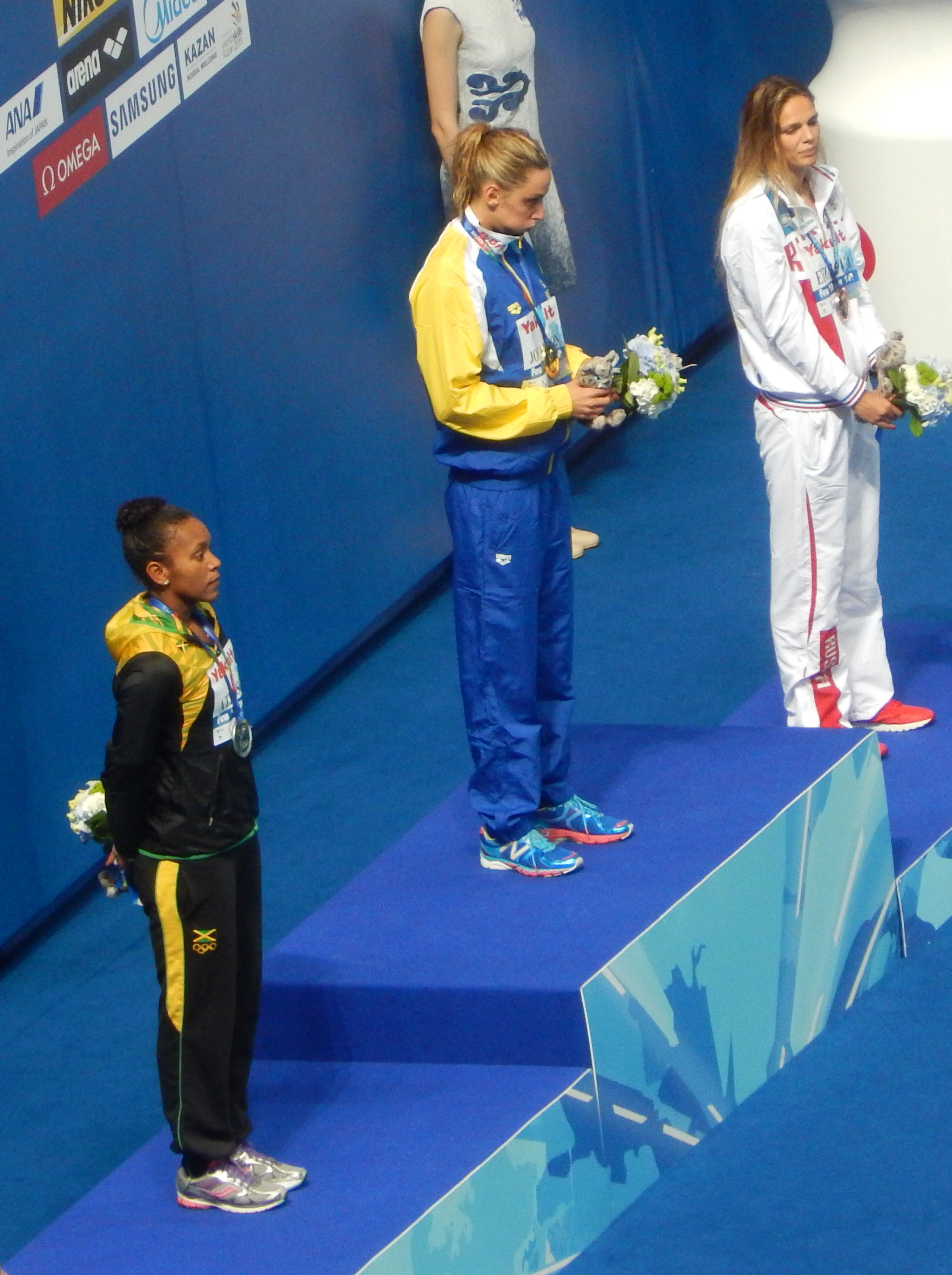
- Victory Ceremony
- Dates: 8 August (heats and semifinals); 9 August (final)
- Competitors: 74 from 67 nations
- Winning time: 30.05

Medalists
gold medal	Jennie Johansson	Sweden
silver medal	Alia Atkinson	Jamaica
bronze medal	Yuliya Yefimova	Russia

The Women's 50 metre breaststroke competition of the swimming events at the 2015 World Aquatics Championships was held on 8 August with the heats and the semifinals and 9 August with the final.

== Records ==
Prior to the competition, the existing world and championship records were as follows.

World record	Rūta Meilutytė (LTU)	29.48	Barcelona, Spain	3 August 2013
Competition record	Rūta Meilutytė (LTU)	29.48	Barcelona, Spain	3 August 2013

== Results ==
=== Heats ===
The heats were held on 8 August at 10:08.

Rank	Heat	Lane	Name	Nationality	Time	Notes
1	8	4	Rūta Meilutytė	Lithuania	29.74	Q
2	6	4	Alia Atkinson	Jamaica	30.27	Q
3	7	5	Jennie Johansson	Sweden	30.30	Q
4	7	4	Jessica Hardy	United States	30.44	Q
5	8	5	Yuliya Yefimova	Russia	30.45	Q
6	8	3	Mariya Liver	Ukraine	30.60	Q, NR
7	6	7	Fanny Lecluyse	Belgium	30.75	Q, NR
8	7	6	Jenna Laukkanen	Finland	30.79	Q, NR
9	6	5	Moniek Nijhuis	Netherlands	30.81	Q
10	7	3	Martina Carraro	Italy	30.83	Q
11	7	7	Rachel Nicol	Canada	30.86	Q
12	8	7	Arianna Castiglioni	Italy	30.90	Q
12	8	1	Hrafnhildur Lúthersdóttir	Iceland	30.90	Q, NR
14	8	0	Suo Ran	China	31.12	Q
15	8	2	Petra Chocová	Czech Republic	31.21	Q
16	6	2	Lorna Tonks	Australia	31.22	Q
17	7	2	Fiona Doyle	Ireland	31.31	
18	5	6	Dominika Sztandera	Poland	31.34	NR
19	6	3	Micah Lawrence	United States	31.38	
20	8	8	Amit Ivry	Israel	31.39	
21	7	9	Jhennifer Conceição	Brazil	31.44	
22	6	1	Viktoriya Zeynep Gunes	Turkey	31.45	
23	6	6	Rikke Møller Pedersen	Denmark	31.48	
24	7	8	Shi Jinglin	China	31.57	
25	5	1	Aikaterini Sarakatsani	Greece	31.58	
26	6	9	Alina Zmushka	Belarus	31.65	
26	7	1	Veera Kivirinta	Finland	31.65	
26	8	6	Sycerika McMahon	Ireland	31.65	
29	5	7	Lena Kreundl	Austria	31.83	
30	5	0	Mercedes Toledo	Venezuela	31.88	NR
31	5	5	Rie Kaneto	Japan	31.99	
32	6	8	Tjaša Vozel	Slovenia	32.00	
33	6	0	Martina Moravčíková	Czech Republic	32.08	
34	5	3	Anna Sztankovics	Hungary	32.11	
35	5	4	Julia Sebastian	Argentina	32.13	
36	4	7	Mai Atef	Egypt	32.14	
37	8	9	Maria Astashkina	Russia	32.18	
38	4	4	Lucia Ledererova	Slovakia	32.20	
38	7	0	Roanne Ho	Singapore	32.20	
40	5	9	Maria Romanjuk	Estonia	32.30	
41	4	2	Phee Phee Jinq En	Malaysia	32.37	
42	5	8	Tatiana Chișca	Moldova	32.38	
43	5	2	Yang Ji-won	South Korea	32.63	
44	4	6	Kong Yvette Man Yi	Hong Kong	32.72	
45	4	9	Evita Leter	Suriname	33.19	
46	4	1	Daniela Carrillo	Mexico	33.53	
47	4	3	Ivana Ninković	Bosnia and Herzegovina	33.77	
48	4	5	Dariya Talanova	Kyrgyzstan	33.89	
49	4	0	Lei On Kei	Macau	33.94	
50	4	8	Sin Jin-hui	North Korea	34.02	
51	3	5	Izzy Joachim	Saint Vincent and the Grenadines	34.09	
52	3	3	Amy Micallef	Malta	34.78	
53	3	4	Jamila Lunkuse	Uganda	34.93	
54	3	6	Chade Nersicio	Curaçao	35.30	
55	3	2	Oreoluwa Cherebin	Grenada	35.39	
56	3	7	Rechael Tonjor	Nigeria	36.10	
57	3	0	Bonita Imsirovic	Botswana	36.46	
58	3	1	Teona Bostashvili	Georgia	37.37	
59	2	3	Darya Semyonova	Turkmenistan	37.64	
60	3	9	Lianna Swan	Pakistan	37.66	
61	2	6	Hemthon Vitiny	Cambodia	37.82	
62	2	5	Angelika Ouedraogo	Burkina Faso	39.25	
63	2	4	Karina Klimyk	Tajikistan	40.17	
64	2	2	Daniah Hagul	Libya	41.17	
65	1	7	Bellore Sangala	Congo	42.48	
66	2	9	Siri Budcharern	Laos	44.14	
67	1	6	Mohamed Nazlati	Comoros	45.75	
68	2	0	Fatema Abdulmohsen	Bahrain	45.91	
69	2	8	Tayamika Chang'anamuno	Malawi	47.00	
70	1	3	Natasha Addai	Ghana	51.73	
71	1	5	Mariama Sow	Guinea	52.65	
72	2	1	Roukaya Mahamane	Niger	52.88	
73	1	2	Bunturabie Jalloh	Sierra Leone	57.64	
	2	7	Laraiba Seibou	Benin		DSQ
	1	4	Liza Kafack	Cameroon		DNS
	3	8	Kokoe Ahyee	Ivory Coast		DNS

=== Semifinals ===
The semifinals were held on 8 August at 17.56.

==== Semifinal 1 ====
Rank	Lane	Name	Nationality	Time	Notes
1	5	Jessica Hardy	United States	30.25	Q
2	3	Mariya Liver	Ukraine	30.64	Q
3	4	Alia Atkinson	Jamaica	30.78	Q
4	1	Suo Ran	China	31.03	
5	8	Lorna Tonks	Australia	31.05	
6	2	Martina Carraro	Italy	31.17	
6	7	Arianna Castiglioni	Italy	31.17	
8	6	Jenna Laukkanen	Finland	31.18	

==== Semifinal 2 ====
Rank	Lane	Name	Nationality	Time	Notes
1	4	Rūta Meilutytė	Lithuania	29.98	Q
2	3	Yuliya Yefimova	Russia	30.14	Q
3	5	Jennie Johansson	Sweden	30.39	Q
4	1	Hrafnhildur Lúthersdóttir	Iceland	30.90	Q, =NR
5	2	Moniek Nijhuis	Netherlands	30.99	Q
6	7	Rachel Nicol	Canada	31.04	
6	6	Fanny Lecluyse	Belgium	31.04	
8	8	Petra Chocová	Czech Republic	31.40	

=== Final ===
The final was held on 9 August at 17:39.

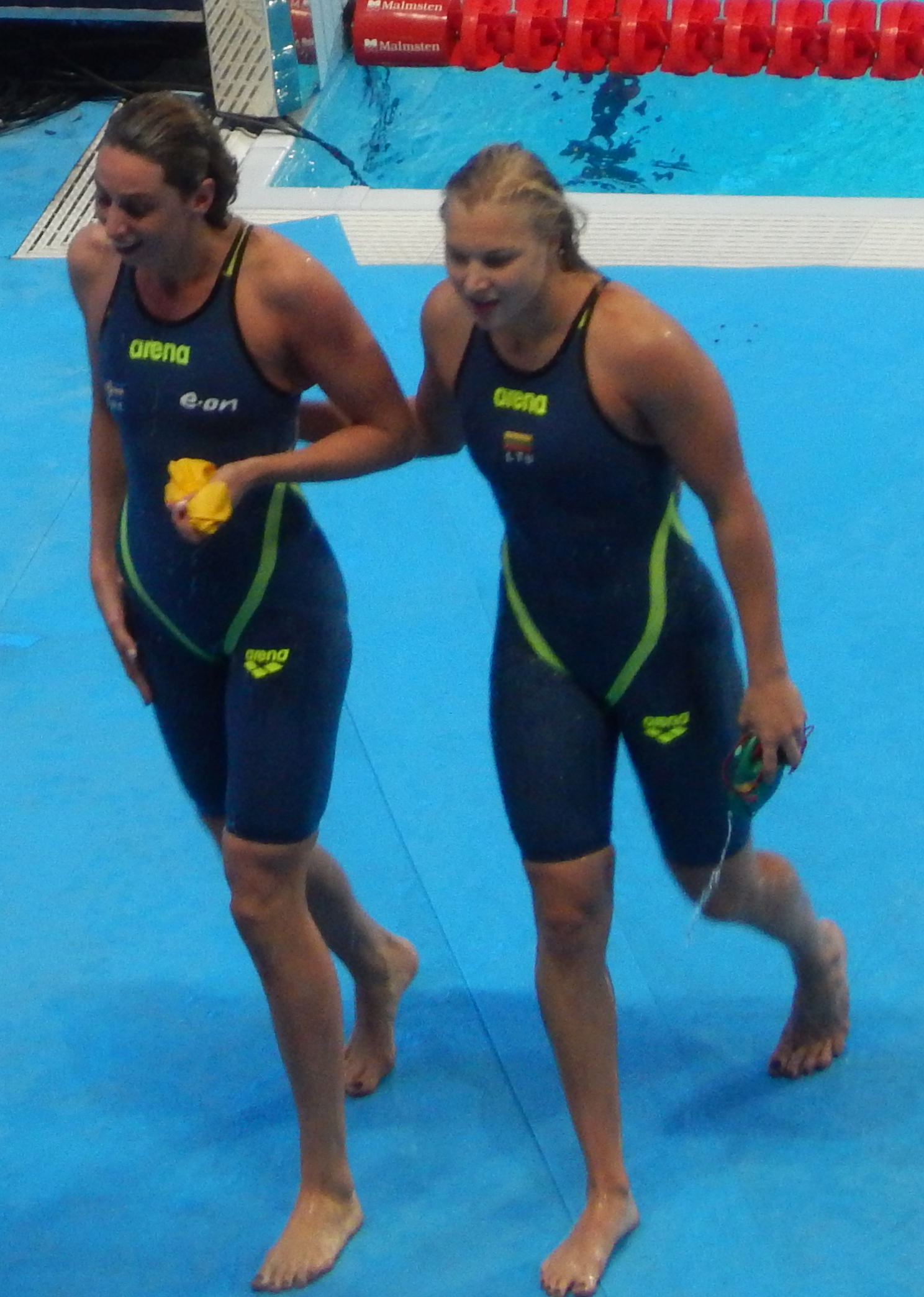
Johansson and Meilutytė after finish

Rank	Lane	Name	Nationality	Time	Notes
1st place, gold medalist(s)	6	Jennie Johansson	Sweden	30.05	NR
2nd place, silver medalist(s)	7	Alia Atkinson	Jamaica	30.11	NR
3rd place, bronze medalist(s)	5	Yuliya Yefimova	Russia	30.13	
4	4	Rūta Meilutytė	Lithuania	30.14	
5	3	Jessica Hardy	United States	30.20	
6	8	Suo Ran	China	30.74	
7	1	Hrafnhildur Lúthersdóttir	Iceland	31.12	
8	2	Mariya Liver	Ukraine	31.14	
