= 2014 Pan Pacific Swimming Championships – Women's 100 metre breaststroke =

Women's 100 metre breaststroke at the 2014 Pan Pacific Swimming Championships
- Venue: Gold Coast Aquatic Centre
- Dates: August 22, 2014 (heats & finals)
- Competitors: 18
- Winning time: 1:06.74

Medalists
gold medal	Jessica Hardy	United States
silver medal	Kanako Watanabe	Japan
bronze medal	Breeja Larson	United States

The women's 100 metre breaststroke competition at the 2014 Pan Pacific Swimming Championships took place on August 22 at the Gold Coast Aquatic Centre. The last champion was Rebecca Soni of United States.

This race consisted of two lengths of the pool, both lengths being in breaststroke.

== Records ==
Prior to this competition, the existing world and Pan Pacific records were as follows:

World record	Rūta Meilutytė (LTU)	1:04.35	Barcelona, Spain	July 29, 2013
Pan Pacific Championships record	Rebecca Soni (USA)	1:04.93	Irvine, United States	August 19, 2010

== Results ==
All times are in minutes and seconds.

KEY:	q	Fastest non-qualifiers	Q	Qualified	CR	Championships record	NR	National record	PB	Personal best	SB	Seasonal best

=== Heats ===
The first round was held on August 22, at 10:13.

Rank	Name	Nationality	Time	Notes
1	Kanako Watanabe	Japan	1:06.83	QA
2	Jessica Hardy	United States	1:06.94	QA
3	Breeja Larson	United States	1:07.06	QA
4	Taylor McKeown	Australia	1:07.48	QA
5	Lorna Tonks	Australia	1:07.51	QA
6	Micah Lawrence	United States	1:07.54	QA
7	Satomi Suzuki	Japan	1:07.59	QA
8	Rie Kaneto	Japan	1:07.97	QA
9	Sally Hunter	Australia	1:08.13	QB
10	Kierra Smith	Canada	1:08.64	QB
11	Miho Teramura	Japan	1:08.84	QB
12	Martha McCabe	Canada	1:09.19	QB
13	Tera van Beilen	Canada	1:09.39	QB
14	Mio Motegi	Japan	1:09.81	QB
15	Liu Xiaoyu	China	1:09.87	QB
16	Ana Carla Carvalho	Brazil	1:10.26	QB
17	Jonker Franko	South Africa	1:11.06	
18	Yvette Kong	Hong Kong	1:11.13	

=== B Final ===
The B final was held on August 22, at 19:38.

Rank	Name	Nationality	Time	Notes
9	Micah Lawrence	United States	1:07.16	
10	Rie Kaneto	Japan	1:08.03	
11	Sally Hunter	Australia	1:08.52	
12	Tera van Beilen	Canada	1:09.02	
13	Liu Xiaoyu	China	1:09.89	
14	Ana Carla Carvalho	Brazil	1:10.00	
15	Jonker Franko	South Africa	1:10.34	
16	Yvette Kong	Hong Kong	1:10.75	

=== A Final ===
The A final was held on August 22, at 19:38.

Rank	Name	Nationality	Time	Notes
1st place, gold medalist(s)	Jessica Hardy	United States	1:06.74	
2nd place, silver medalist(s)	Kanako Watanabe	Japan	1:06.78	
3rd place, bronze medalist(s)	Breeja Larson	United States	1:06.99	
4	Lorna Tonks	Australia	1:07.41	
5	Taylor McKeown	Australia	1:07.55	
6	Satomi Suzuki	Japan	1:07.99	
7	Kierra Smith	Canada	1:08.49	
8	Martha McCabe	Canada	1:08.96	
