= Swimming at the 2016 Summer Olympics – Women's 200 metre breaststroke =

Women's 200 metre breaststroke at the Games of the XXXI Olympiad
- Venue: Olympic Aquatics Stadium
- Dates: 10 August 2016 (heats & semifinals); 11 August 2016 (final)
- Competitors: 30 from 22 nations
- Winning time: 2:20.30

Medalists
1st place, gold medalist(s)		Rie Kaneto	Japan
2nd place, silver medalist(s)		Yuliya Yefimova	Russia
3rd place, bronze medalist(s)		Shi Jinglin	China

The women's 200 metre breaststroke event at the 2016 Summer Olympics took place on 10–11 August at the Olympic Aquatics Stadium.

== Summary ==
Japan's Rie Kaneto pulled away from a tightly-packed field over a wide margin to become the country's third gold medalist in the event's history, since Hideko Maehata topped the podium in 1936, and Kyoko Iwasaki in 1992. She swam through the final lap to a decisive gold-medal triumph in 2:20.30, but fell short of her attempt to overhaul a sub-2:20 range at the Games. Russia's Yuliya Yefimova launched a late charge on the home stretch to get her second silver of the meet in 2:21.97. Meanwhile, China's Shi Jinglin rebounded from an out-of-medal feat in the 100 m breaststroke three days earlier to earn the bronze with a 2:22.28, beating Great Britain's Chloe Tutton (2:22.34) by just six hundredths of a second.

Australia's Taylor McKeown seized a substantial lead through the initial half of the race, but slipped shortly off the podium to fifth in 2:22.43. Tutton's teammate Molly Renshaw, who scratched the existing British record earlier in the semifinals, picked up a sixth spot in 2:22.72. Outside the 2:22 club, Canada's Kierra Smith (2:23.19) and Denmark's world-record holder Rikke Møller Pedersen (2:23.74) rounded out the field.

Tandem Molly Hannis and Lilly King, the newly-crowned Olympic champion of the 100 m breaststroke, had put their medal hunt to an end in this event, as neither of them advanced to the final. Other notable swimmers missed the top eight roster, featuring Japan's Kanako Watanabe, the 2015 world champion, and Turkey's Viktoriya Zeynep Güneş, the fastest pre-race seed headed to the Games.

The medals for the competition were presented by Yumilka Ruiz, IOC member from Colombia, and the gifts were presented by Kazuo Sano, executive member of the FINA.

== Records ==
Prior to this competition, the existing world and Olympic records were as follows.

World record	Rikke Møller Pedersen (DEN)	2:19.11	Barcelona, Spain	1 August 2013
Olympic record	Rebecca Soni (USA)	2:19.59	London, United Kingdom	2 August 2012

== Competition format ==
The competition consisted of three rounds: heats, semifinals, and a final. The swimmers with the best 16 times in the heats advanced to the semifinals. The swimmers with the best 8 times in the semifinals advanced to the final. Swim-offs were used as necessary to break ties for advancement to the next round.

== Results ==
=== Heats ===
Rank	Heat	Lane	Name	Nationality	Time	Notes
1	2	5	Rikke Møller Pedersen	Denmark	2:22.72	Q
2	3	4	Rie Kaneto	Japan	2:22.86	Q
3	3	5	Taylor McKeown	Australia	2:23.00	Q
4	3	3	Chloe Tutton	Great Britain	2:23.34	Q
5	2	6	Molly Renshaw	Great Britain	2:23.37	Q
6	4	6	Kierra Smith	Canada	2:23.69	Q
7	4	4	Viktoriya Zeynep Güneş	Turkey	2:23.83	Q
8	4	5	Yuliya Yefimova	Russia	2:23.90	Q
9	4	3	Shi Jinglin	China	2:24.33	Q
10	3	6	Hrafnhildur Lúthersdóttir	Iceland	2:24.43	Q
11	2	3	Jessica Vall	Spain	2:24.55	Q
12	4	7	Molly Hannis	United States	2:24.74	Q
13	2	4	Kanako Watanabe	Japan	2:24.77	Q
14	4	1	Jenna Laukkanen	Finland	2:25.52	Q
15	2	2	Lilly King	United States	2:25.89	Q
16	2	7	Sofiya Andreeva	Russia	2:26.58	Q
17	4	2	Fanny Lecluyse	Belgium	2:27.16	
18	3	1	Martina Moravčíková	Czech Republic	2:27.51	
19	3	8	Dalma Sebestyén	Hungary	2:27.94	
20	2	8	Anna Sztankovics	Hungary	2:27.97	
21	1	4	Julia Sebastián	Argentina	2:27.98	
22	3	2	Georgia Bohl	Australia	2:28.24	
23	3	7	Martha McCabe	Canada	2:28.62	
24	4	8	Yu Jingyao	China	2:28.65	
25	1	3	Fiona Doyle	Ireland	2:29.76	
26	1	2	Sophie Hansson	Sweden	2:30.59	
27	1	7	Aļona Ribakova	Latvia	2:30.82	
28	1	6	Amit Ivry	Israel	2:31.49	
29	2	1	Back Su-yeon	South Korea	2:32.79	
	1	5	Yvette Kong	Hong Kong	DNS	

=== Semifinals ===
==== Semifinal 1 ====
Rank	Lane	Name	Nationality	Time	Notes
1	4	Rie Kaneto	Japan	2:22.11	Q
2	6	Yuliya Yefimova	Russia	2:22.52	Q
3	5	Chloe Tutton	Great Britain	2:22.71	Q
4	3	Kierra Smith	Canada	2:22.87	Q
5	2	Hrafnhildur Lúthersdóttir	Iceland	2:24.41	
6	1	Jenna Laukkanen	Finland	2:25.14	NR
7	8	Sofiya Andreeva	Russia	2:25.90	
8	7	Molly Hannis	United States	2:26.80	

==== Semifinal 2 ====
Rank	Lane	Name	Nationality	Time	Notes
1	5	Taylor McKeown	Australia	2:21.69	Q
2	3	Molly Renshaw	Great Britain	2:22.33	Q, NR
3	2	Shi Jinglin	China	2:22.37	Q
4	4	Rikke Møller Pedersen	Denmark	2:22.45	Q
5	6	Viktoriya Zeynep Güneş	Turkey	2:23.49	
6	7	Jessica Vall	Spain	2:24.22	
7	8	Lilly King	United States	2:24.59	
8	1	Kanako Watanabe	Japan	2:25.10	

=== Final ===
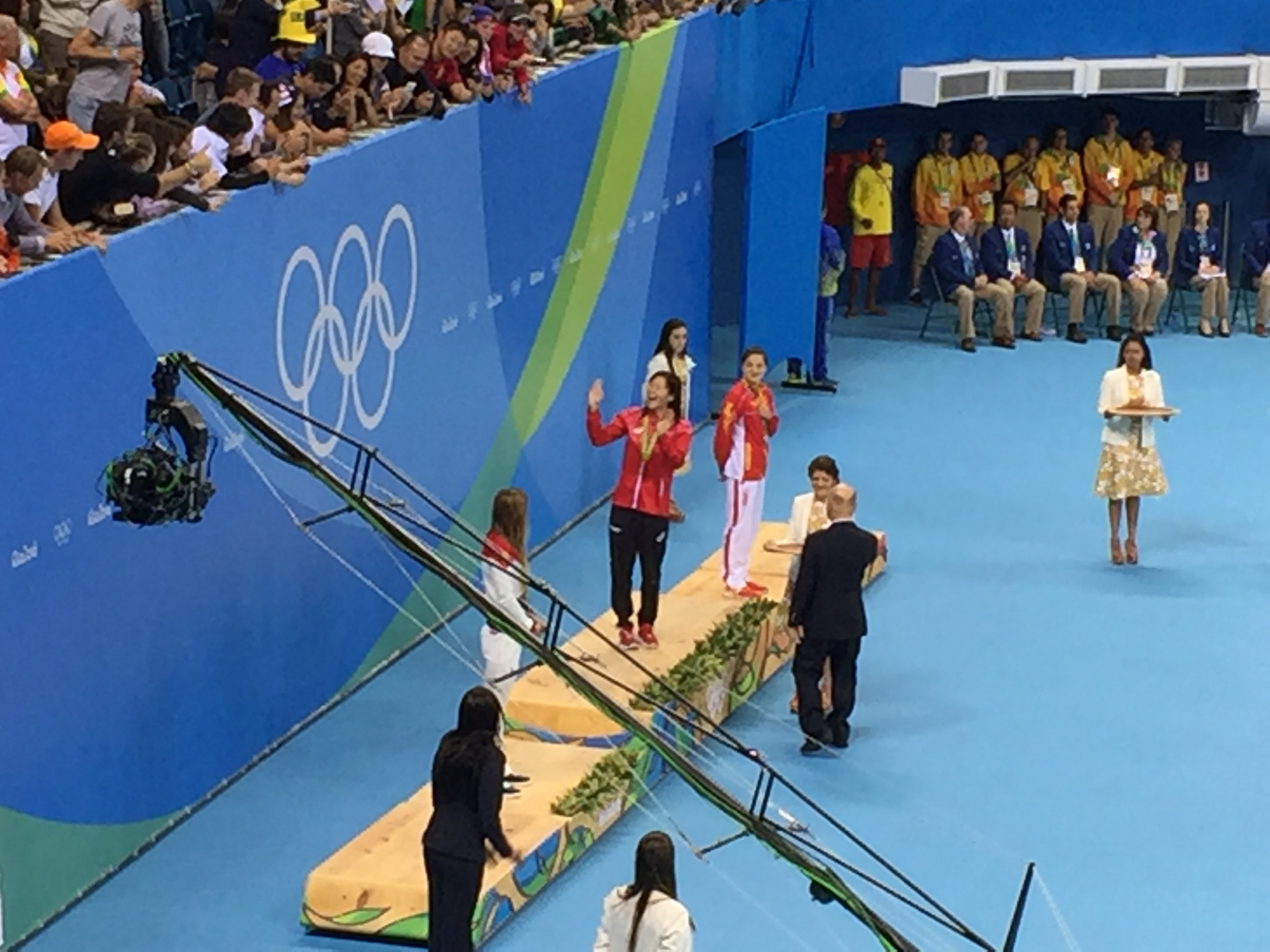
Medal ceremony. Shi Jinglin has received her bronze, Yulia Yefimova is awarded the silver, and gold medalist Rie Kaneto interacts with the audience.

Rank	Lane	Name	Nationality	Time	Notes
1st place, gold medalist(s)	5	Rie Kaneto	Japan	2:20.30	
2nd place, silver medalist(s)	7	Yuliya Yefimova	Russia	2:21.97	
3rd place, bronze medalist(s)	6	Shi Jinglin	China	2:22.28	
4	1	Chloe Tutton	Great Britain	2:22.34	
5	4	Taylor McKeown	Australia	2:22.43	
6	3	Molly Renshaw	Great Britain	2:22.72	
7	8	Kierra Smith	Canada	2:23.19	
8	2	Rikke Møller Pedersen	Denmark	2:23.74	
