= 2014 Pan Pacific Swimming Championships – Women's 200 metre breaststroke =

Women's 200 metre breaststroke at the 2014 Pan Pacific Swimming Championships
- Venue: Gold Coast Aquatic Centre
- Dates: August 24, 2014 (heats & finals)
- Competitors: 15
- Winning time: 2:21.41

Medalists
gold medal	Kanako Watanabe	Japan
silver medal	Rie Kaneto	Japan
bronze medal	Taylor McKeown	Australia

The women's 200 metre breaststroke competition at the 2014 Pan Pacific Swimming Championships took place on August 24 at the Gold Coast Aquatic Centre. The last champion was Rebecca Soni of United States.

This race consisted of four lengths of the pool, all in breaststroke.

== Records ==
Prior to this competition, the existing world and Pan Pacific records were as follows:

World record	Rikke Møller Pedersen (DEN)	2:19.11	Barcelona, Spain	August 1, 2013
Pan Pacific Championships record	Rebecca Soni (USA)	2:20.69	Irvine, United States	August 21, 2010

== Results ==
All times are in minutes and seconds.

KEY:	q	Fastest non-qualifiers	Q	Qualified	CR	Championships record	NR	National record	PB	Personal best	SB	Seasonal best

=== Heats ===
The first round was held on August 24, at 11:22.

Rank	Name	Nationality	Time	Notes
1	Rie Kaneto	Japan	2:23.18	QA
2	Kanako Watanabe	Japan	2:23.44	QA
3	Kierra Smith	Canada	2:24.02	QA
4	Breeja Larson	United States	2:24.50	QA
5	Micah Lawrence	United States	2:24.70	QA
6	Taylor McKeown	Australia	2:25.16	QA
7	Martha McCabe	Canada	2:26.12	QA
8	Mio Motegi	Japan	2:26.22	QA
9	Sally Hunter	Australia	2:26.44	QB
10	Satomi Suzuki	Japan	2:30.45	QB
11	Jonker Franko	South Africa	2:32.68	QB
12	Tera van Beilen	Canada	2:35.41	QB
13	Ana Carla Carvalho	Brazil	2:38.67	QB
14	Yvette Kong	Hong Kong	2:39.73	QB
15	Liu Xiaoyu	China	2:40.35	QB

=== B Final ===
The B final was held on August 24, at 20:35.

Rank	Name	Nationality	Time	Notes
9	Mio Motegi	Japan	2:27.20	
10	Satomi Suzuki	Japan	2:30.87	
11	Franko Jonker	South Africa	2:33.87	
12	Liu Xiaoyu	China	2:35.14	

=== A Final ===
The A final was held on August 24, at 20:35.

Rank	Name	Nationality	Time	Notes
1st place, gold medalist(s)	Kanako Watanabe	Japan	2:21.41	
2nd place, silver medalist(s)	Rie Kaneto	Japan	2:21.90	
3rd place, bronze medalist(s)	Taylor McKeown	Australia	2:22.89	
4	Kierra Smith	Canada	2:23.32	
5	Micah Lawrence	United States	2:24.60	
6	Breeja Larson	United States	2:24.90	
7	Sally Hunter	Australia	2:25.25	
8	Martha McCabe	Canada	2:25.62	
