= Swimming at the 2015 World Aquatics Championships – Women's 200 metre breaststroke =

Women's 200 metre breaststroke at the 2015 World Aquatics Championships
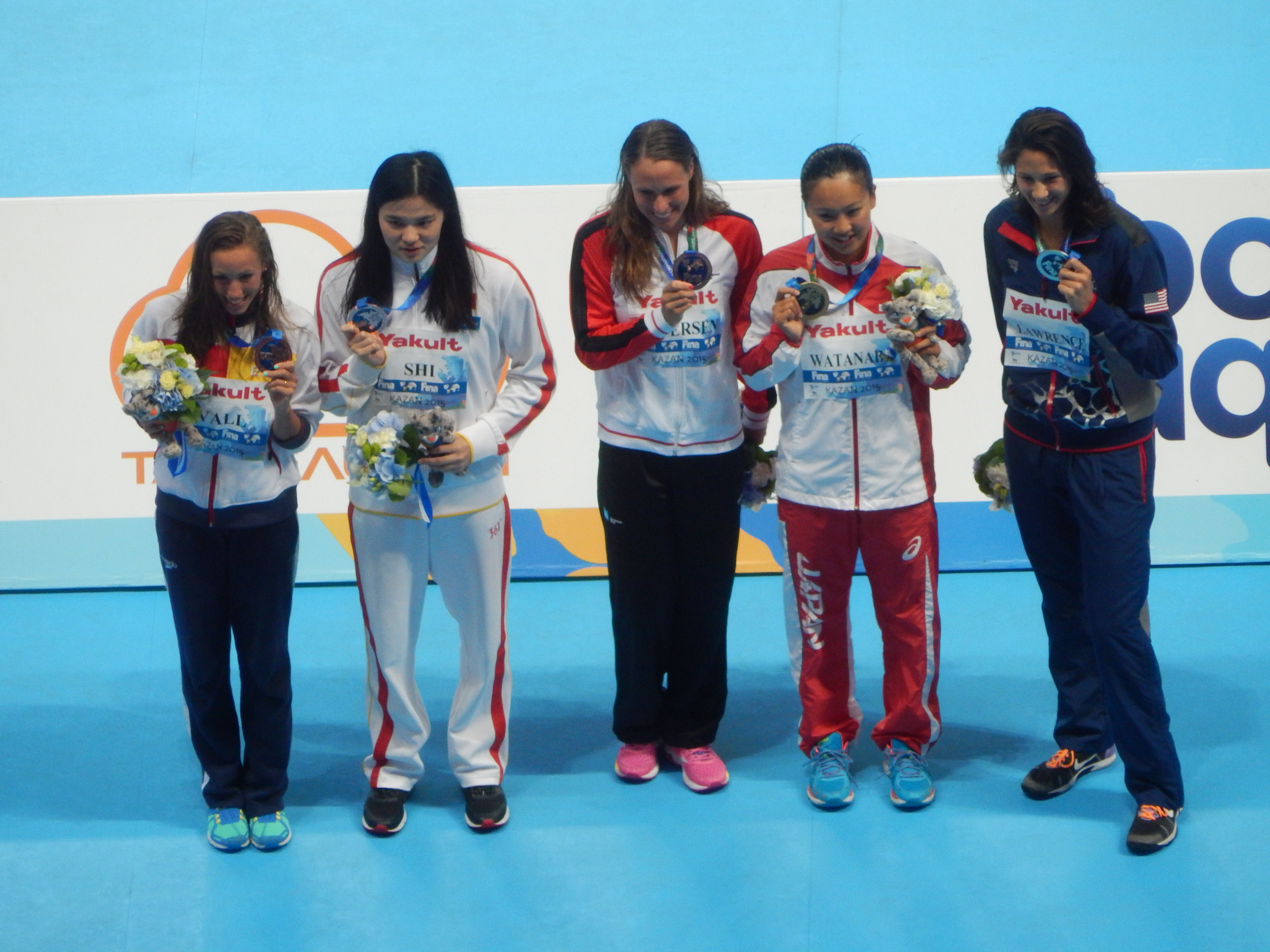
- Medallists
- Dates: 6 August (heats and semifinals); 7 August (final)
- Competitors: 50 from 42 nations
- Winning time: 2:21.15

Medalists
gold medal	Kanako Watanabe	Japan
silver medal	Micah Lawrence	United States
bronze medal	Jessica Vall	Spain
bronze medal	Rikke Møller Pedersen	Denmark
bronze medal	Shi Jinglin	China

The Women's 200 metre breaststroke competition of the swimming events at the 2015 World Aquatics Championships was held on 6 August with the heats and the semifinals and 7 August with the final.

== Records ==
Prior to the competition, the existing world and championship records were as follows.

World record	Rikke Møller Pedersen (DEN)	2:19.11	Barcelona, Spain	1 August 2013
Competition record	Rikke Møller Pedersen (DEN)	2:19.11	Barcelona, Spain	1 August 2013

== Results ==
=== Heats ===
The heats were held at 10:11.

Rank	Heat	Lane	Name	Nationality	Time	Notes
1	4	4	Kanako Watanabe	Japan	2:23.29	Q
2	4	3	Micah Lawrence	United States	2:23.32	Q
3	4	7	Hrafnhildur Lúthersdóttir	Iceland	2:23.54	Q, NR
4	3	1	Fanny Lecluyse	Belgium	2:23.77	Q, NR
5	5	3	Viktoriya Zeynep Gunes	Turkey	2:23.81	Q
6	5	4	Rikke Møller Pedersen	Denmark	2:23.90	Q
7	5	2	Jessica Vall	Spain	2:23.97	Q
8	4	6	Vitalina Simonova	Russia	2:23.99	Q
9	4	5	Taylor McKeown	Australia	2:24.02	Q
10	5	5	Shi Jinglin	China	2:24.09	Q
11	3	3	Kierra Smith	Canada	2:24.12	Q
12	5	6	Tessa Wallace	Australia	2:24.88	Q
13	5	7	Marina García Urzainqui	Spain	2:25.32	Q
14	5	8	Vanessa Grimberg	Germany	2:25.74	Q
15	3	4	Rie Kaneto	Japan	2:25.75	Q
16	5	1	Jenna Laukkanen	Finland	2:25.91	Q, NR
17	3	5	Yuliya Yefimova	Russia	2:26.11	
18	3	6	Molly Renshaw	Great Britain	2:26.32	
19	4	2	Breeja Larson	United States	2:26.38	
20	3	7	Ilaria Scarcella	Italy	2:26.40	
21	3	2	Martha McCabe	Canada	2:26.51	
22	5	0	Martina Moravčíková	Czech Republic	2:28.41	
23	4	1	Zhang Xinyu	China	2:28.57	
24	3	9	Tanja Šmid	Slovenia	2:28.64	
25	3	8	Yang Ji-won	South Korea	2:29.24	
26	4	9	Julia Sebastian	Argentina	2:29.28	
26	5	9	Anna Sztankovics	Hungary	2:29.28	
28	2	7	Ana Radić	Croatia	2:29.71	
29	3	0	Fiona Doyle	Ireland	2:29.77	NR
30	1	6	Daniela Carrillo	Mexico	2:30.65	
31	2	8	Maria Romanjuk	Estonia	2:31.37	NR
32	2	5	Raminta Dvariškytė	Lithuania	2:31.74	
33	4	0	Jung Seul-ki	South Korea	2:31.85	
34	2	0	Mercedes Toledo	Venezuela	2:32.69	NR
35	2	3	Victoria Kaminskaya	Portugal	2:33.73	
36	1	3	Samantha Yeo	Singapore	2:33.85	
37	2	2	Aļona Ribakova	Latvia	2:34.69	
38	2	6	Phiangkhwan Pawapotako	Thailand	2:34.77	
39	1	5	Daniela Lindemeier	Namibia	2:35.17	
40	2	1	Jovana Bogdanović	Serbia	2:35.88	
41	4	8	Anastasiya Malyavina	Ukraine	2:36.49	
42	2	4	Dariya Talanova	Kyrgyzstan	2:37.04	
43	1	4	Lin Pei-wun	Chinese Taipei	2:39.19	
44	1	2	Mihaela Bat	Moldova	2:40.57	
45	2	9	Sin Jin-hui	North Korea	2:41.41	
46	1	0	Tilka Paljk	Zambia	2:55.98	
47	1	1	Pilar Shimizu	Guam	2:56.47	
48	1	8	Anum Bandey	Pakistan	2:58.10	
49	1	7	Nooran Ba Matraf	Yemen	3:07.78	
50	1	9	Sajina Aishath	Maldives	3:16.50	

=== Semifinals ===
The semifinals were held at 17:51.

==== Semifinal 1 ====
Rank	Lane	Name	Nationality	Time	Notes
1	3	Rikke Møller Pedersen	Denmark	2:21.99	Q
2	4	Micah Lawrence	United States	2:22.04	Q
3	6	Vitalina Simonova	Russia	2:22.72	Q
4	2	Shi Jinglin	China	2:23.06	QSO
5	5	Fanny Lecluyse	Belgium	2:23.83	
6	7	Tessa Wallace	Australia	2:24.68	
7	1	Vanessa Grimberg	Germany	2:25.36	
8	8	Jenna Laukkanen	Finland	2:25.45	NR

==== Semifinal 2 ====
Rank	Lane	Name	Nationality	Time	Notes
1	4	Kanako Watanabe	Japan	2:22.15	Q
2	7	Kierra Smith	Canada	2:22.82	Q
3	8	Rie Kaneto	Japan	2:22.88	Q
4	6	Jessica Vall	Spain	2:22.90	Q
5	5	Hrafnhildur Lúthersdóttir	Iceland	2:23.06	QSO, NR
6	3	Viktoriya Zeynep Gunes	Turkey	2:24.01	
7	2	Taylor McKeown	Australia	2:24.41	
8	1	Marina García Urzainqui	Spain	2:25.52	

==== Swim-off ====
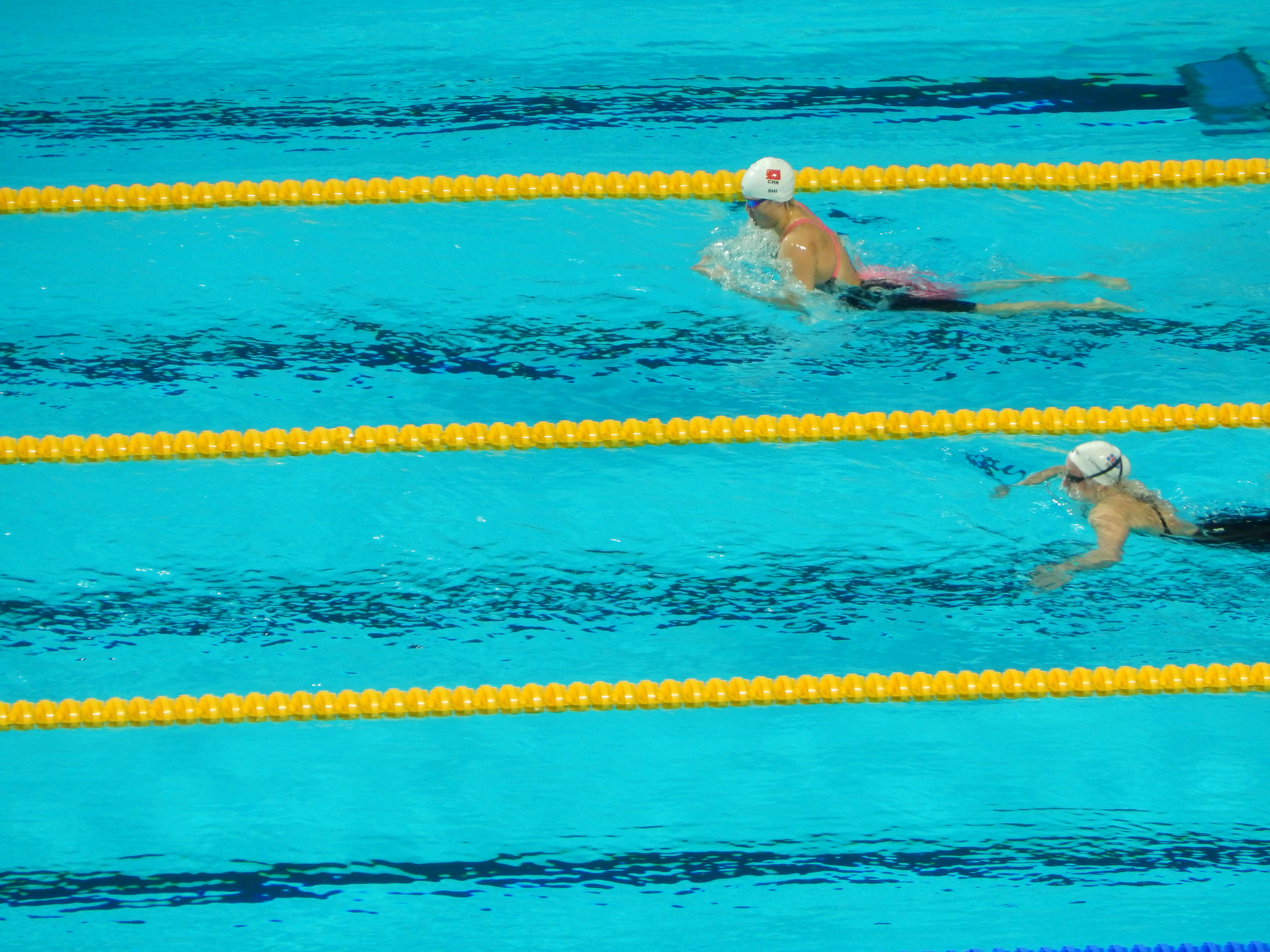
Swim-off

The swim-off was held at 19:43.

Rank	Lane	Name	Nationality	Time	Notes
1	4	Shi Jinglin	China	2:23.75	Q
2	5	Hrafnhildur Lúthersdóttir	Iceland	2:25.11	

=== Final ===
The final was held at 18:25.

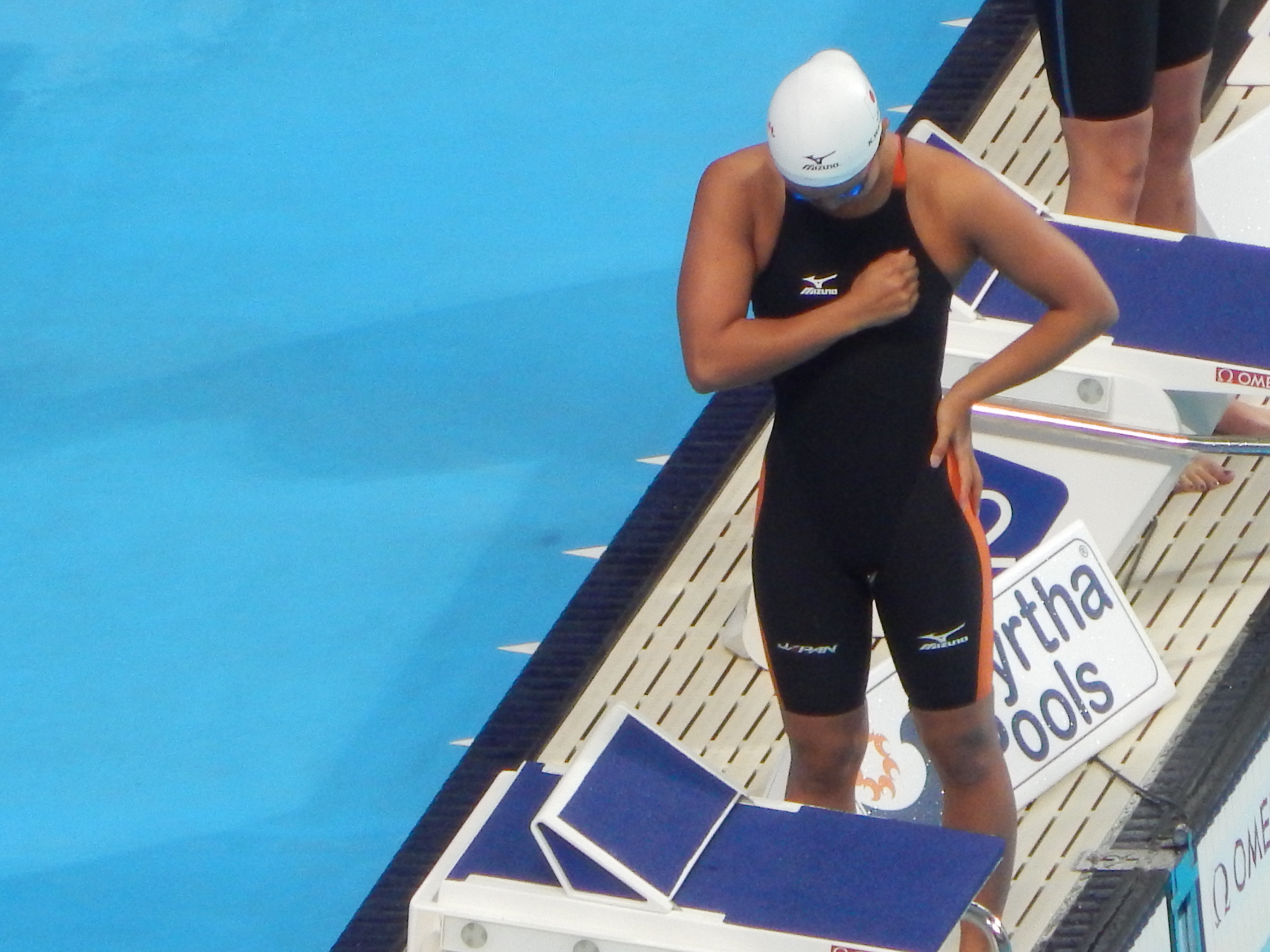
Watanabe before her final

Rank	Lane	Name	Nationality	Time	Notes
1st place, gold medalist(s)	3	Kanako Watanabe	Japan	2:21.15	
2nd place, silver medalist(s)	5	Micah Lawrence	United States	2:22.44	
3rd place, bronze medalist(s)	1	Jessica Vall	Spain	2:22.76	
3rd place, bronze medalist(s)	4	Rikke Møller Pedersen	Denmark	2:22.76	
3rd place, bronze medalist(s)	8	Shi Jinglin	China	2:22.76	
6	7	Rie Kaneto	Japan	2:23.19	
7	6	Vitalina Simonova	Russia	2:23.59	
8	2	Kierra Smith	Canada	2:23.61	
