= Swimming at the 2016 Summer Olympics – Women's 100 metre breaststroke =

Women's 100 metre breaststroke at the Games of the XXXI Olympiad
- Venue: Olympic Aquatics Stadium
- Dates: 7 August 2016 (heats & semifinals); 8 August 2016 (final)
- Competitors: 44 from 35 nations
- Winning time: 1:04.93 OR

Medalists
1st place, gold medalist(s)		Lilly King	United States
2nd place, silver medalist(s)		Yuliya Yefimova	Russia
3rd place, bronze medalist(s)		Katie Meili	United States

The women's 100 metre breaststroke event at the 2016 Summer Olympics took place on 7–8 August at the Olympic Aquatics Stadium.

== Summary ==
U.S. swimmer Lilly King stormed home on the final lap in a match against Russia's Yuliya Yefimova to capture the sprint breaststroke title for the first time since Megan Quann topped the podium in 2000. With 15 metres to go, King launched a mighty surge to pass Yefimova by more than half a second for the gold medal with a time of 1:04.93. King's time also shaved 0.24 seconds off the Olympic record set by Australia's four-time Olympian Leisel Jones in Beijing in 2008. Yefimova finished with a silver in 1:05.50. King's teammate Katie Meili snared the final podium spot with a 1:05.69 for the bronze.

China's Shi Jinglin delivered a time of 1:06.37 to pick up the fourth spot, just ahead of Canada's Rachel Nicol (1:06.68) by about three tenths of a second. Iceland's Hrafnhildur Lúthersdóttir placed sixth in 1:07.18, while Lithuania's world-record holder and defending champion Rūta Meilutytė could not reproduce her effort from London 2012 with a seventh-place time in 1:07.32. Jamaica's Alia Atkinson, fourth-place finalist at the previous Games, rounded out the top eight with a 1:08.10.

The medals for the competition were presented by Richard Peterkin, IOC member from Saint Lucia, and the gifts were presented by Donald Rukare, FINA bureau member.

== Records ==
Prior to this competition, the existing world and Olympic records were as follows.

World record	Rūta Meilutytė (LTU)	1:04.35	Barcelona, Spain	29 July 2013
Olympic record	Leisel Jones (AUS)	1:05.17	Beijing, China	10 August 2008

The following records were established during the competition:

Date	Round	Name	Nation	Time	Record
8 August	Final	Lilly King	United States	1:04.93	OR

== Competition format ==
The competition consisted of three rounds: heats, semifinals, and a final. The swimmers with the best 16 times in the heats advanced to the semifinals. The swimmers with the best 8 times in the semifinals advanced to the final. Swim-offs were used as necessary to break ties for advancement to the next round.

== Results ==
=== Heats ===
Rank	Heat	Lane	Name	Nationality	Time	Notes
1	6	4	Lilly King	United States	1:05.78	Q
2	5	4	Yuliya Yefimova	Russia	1:05.79	Q
3	4	4	Katie Meili	United States	1:06.00	Q
4	6	5	Rūta Meilutytė	Lithuania	1:06.35	Q
5	6	3	Shi Jinglin	China	1:06.55	Q
6	4	7	Rikke Møller Pedersen	Denmark	1:06.58	Q
7	5	5	Alia Atkinson	Jamaica	1:06.72	Q
8	4	6	Taylor McKeown	Australia	1:06.73	Q
9	6	6	Hrafnhildur Lúthersdóttir	Iceland	1:06.81	Q
10	5	6	Jennie Johansson	Sweden	1:06.84	Q
11	4	2	Rachel Nicol	Canada	1:06.85	Q
12	5	8	Chloé Tutton	Great Britain	1:06.88	Q
13	6	2	Satomi Suzuki	Japan	1:06.99	Q
14	6	1	Jessica Vall	Spain	1:07.07	Q
15	5	2	Viktoria Zeynep Güneş	Turkey	1:07.14	Q
16	4	3	Kanako Watanabe	Japan	1:07.22	Q
17	5	7	Arianna Castiglioni	Italy	1:07.32	
18	3	4	Jenna Laukkanen	Finland	1:07.35	NR
19	6	7	Kierra Smith	Canada	1:07.41	
20	5	3	Martina Carraro	Italy	1:07.56	
21	5	1	Fiona Doyle	Ireland	1:07.58	
22	6	8	Zhang Xinyu	China	1:07.59	
23	3	2	Molly Renshaw	Great Britain	1:07.92	
24	4	5	Georgia Bohl	Australia	1:07.96	
25	3	1	Anna Sztankovics	Hungary	1:08.06	
26	3	8	Martina Moravčíková	Czech Republic	1:08.50	
27	3	5	Sophie Hansson	Sweden	1:08.67	
28	4	1	Fanny Lecluyse	Belgium	1:08.80	
29	4	8	Daria Chikunova	Russia	1:09.12	
30	3	6	Amit Ivry	Israel	1:09.42	
31	2	5	Maria Romanjuk	Estonia	1:09.49	
32	3	3	Yvette Kong	Hong Kong	1:09.56	
33	2	4	Phee Jinq En	Malaysia	1:10.22	
34	2	6	Dariya Talanova	Kyrgyzstan	1:10.94	
35	3	7	Tjaša Vozel	Slovenia	1:11.15	
36	2	3	Tatiana Chișca	Moldova	1:11.37	
37	2	2	Evita Leter	Suriname	1:14.96	
38	2	1	Pilar Shimizu	Guam	1:16.65	
39	2	8	Izzy Shne Joachim	Saint Vincent and the Grenadines	1:17.37	
40	2	7	Jamila Lunkuse	Uganda	1:19.64	
41	1	3	Darýa Semýonowa	Turkmenistan	1:19.84	
42	1	5	Rechael Tonjor	Nigeria	1:21.43	
43	1	4	Teona Bostashvili	Georgia	1:22.91	
44	1	6	Daniah Hagul	Libya	1:25.47	

=== Semifinals ===
==== Semifinal 1 ====
Rank	Lane	Name	Nationality	Time	Notes
1	4	Yuliya Yefimova	Russia	1:05.72	Q
2	5	Rūta Meilutytė	Lithuania	1:06.44	Q
3	2	Jennie Johansson	Sweden	1:07.06	
4	3	Rikke Møller Pedersen	Denmark	1:07.07	
5	6	Taylor McKeown	Australia	1:07.12	
6	7	Chloé Tutton	Great Britain	1:07.29	
7	8	Kanako Watanabe	Japan	1:07.43	
8	1	Jessica Vall	Spain	1:07.55	

==== Semifinal 2 ====
Rank	Lane	Name	Nationality	Time	Notes
1	4	Lilly King	United States	1:05.70	Q
2	3	Shi Jinglin	China	1:06.31	Q
3	5	Katie Meili	United States	1:06.52	Q
3	6	Alia Atkinson	Jamaica	1:06.52	Q
5	2	Hrafnhildur Lúthersdóttir	Iceland	1:06.71	Q
6	7	Rachel Nicol	Canada	1:06.73	Q
7	1	Satomi Suzuki	Japan	1:07.18	
8	8	Viktoria Zeynep Güneş	Turkey	1:07.41	

=== Final ===
Rank	Lane	Name	Nationality	Time	Notes
1st place, gold medalist(s)	4	Lilly King	United States	1:04.93	OR
2nd place, silver medalist(s)	5	Yuliya Yefimova	Russia	1:05.50	
3rd place, bronze medalist(s)	2	Katie Meili	United States	1:05.69	
4	3	Shi Jinglin	China	1:06.37	
5	8	Rachel Nicol	Canada	1:06.68	
6	1	Hrafnhildur Lúthersdóttir	Iceland	1:07.18	
7	6	Rūta Meilutytė	Lithuania	1:07.32	
8	7	Alia Atkinson	Jamaica	1:08.10	
