= 2014 FINA World Swimming Championships (25 m) – Women's 200 metre breaststroke =

Women's 200 metre breaststroke at the 2014 FINA World Swimming Championships (25 m)
- Dates: 7 December
- Competitors: 43 from 34 nations
- Winning time: 2:16.92

Medalists
gold medal	Kanako Watanabe	Japan
silver medal	Rie Kaneto	Japan
bronze medal	Rikke Møller Pedersen	Denmark

The Women's 200 metre breaststroke competition of the 2014 FINA World Swimming Championships (25 m) will be held on 7 December.

== Records ==
Prior to the competition, the existing world and championship records were as follows.

	Name	Nation	Time	Location	Date
World record	Rebecca Soni	United States	2:14.57	Manchester	18 December 2009
Championship record	Rikke Møller Pedersen	Denmark	2:16.08	Istanbul	16 December 2012

== Results ==
=== Heats ===
The heats were held at 10:05.

Rank	Heat	Lane	Name	Nationality	Time	Notes
1	4	4	Kanako Watanabe	Japan	2:18.45	Q
2	5	5	Vitalina Simonova	Russia	2:18.80	Q
3	3	7	Kierra Smith	Canada	2:18.95	Q
4	3	5	Shi Jinglin	China	2:18.98	Q
5	4	5	Rie Kaneto	Japan	2:19.16	Q
6	5	4	Rikke Møller Pedersen	Denmark	2:19.24	Q
7	4	3	Martha McCabe	Canada	2:19.49	Q
8	5	6	Mariia Astashkina	Russia	2:19.71	Q
9	3	3	Sally Hunter	Australia	2:20.06	
10	3	4	Alia Atkinson	Jamaica	2:20.08	
11	4	2	Fanny Lecluyse	Belgium	2:20.13	
12	5	1	Moniek Nijhuis	Netherlands	2:21.16	
13	3	6	He Yun	China	2:21.52	
14	4	9	Emma Reaney	United States	2:21.58	
15	5	7	Jessica Vall Montero	Spain	2:21.66	
16	4	1	Jenna Laukkanen	Finland	2:22.36	
17	3	1	Hrafnhildur Lúthersdóttir	Iceland	2:22.69	
18	4	7	Vanessa Grimberg	Germany	2:22.78	
19	5	3	Viktoria Güneş	Turkey	2:22.93	
20	5	8	Tjaša Vozel	Slovenia	2:22.96	
21	5	2	Hanna Dzerkal	Ukraine	2:23.63	
22	3	8	Hannah Miley	Great Britain	2:23.71	
23	5	0	Melanie Margalis	United States	2:23.74	
24	3	2	Julia Sebastian	Argentina	2:25.37	
25	4	8	Ana Radić	Croatia	2:26.44	
26	5	9	Emily Visagie	South Africa	2:26.65	
27	2	4	Jovana Bogdanović	Serbia	2:26.92	
28	4	6	Amit Ivry	Israel	2:26.97	
29	4	0	Tatjana Schoenmaker	South Africa	2:28.25	
30	2	2	Fanni Gyurinovics	Hungary	2:29.62	
31	2	6	Lin Pei-wun	Chinese Taipei	2:29.73	
32	3	0	Dariya Talanova	Kyrgyzstan	2:33.03	
33	2	3	Ana Carla Carvalho	Brazil	2:33.64	
34	2	5	Gülşen Samanci	Turkey	2:34.07	
35	2	1	Antonia Roth	Namibia	2:34.33	
36	2	9	María Burgos	Puerto Rico	2:37.73	
37	2	8	Lei On Kei	Macau	2:39.38	
38	2	0	Sofía López	Paraguay	2:39.90	
39	1	4	Savannah Tkatchenko	Papua New Guinea	2:40.78	
40	1	3	San Su Moe Theint	Myanmar	2:51.56	
41	1	6	Bonita Imsirovic	Botswana	2:55.30	
42	1	5	Chade Nersicio	Curaçao	3:02.15	
—	3	9	Maria Marzocchi	Seychelles		DNS
—	2	7	Daniela Lindemeier	Namibia		DSQ

=== Final ===
The final were held at 18:28.

Rank	Lane	Name	Nationality	Time	Notes
1st place, gold medalist(s)	4	Kanako Watanabe	Japan	2:16.92	
2nd place, silver medalist(s)	2	Rie Kaneto	Japan	2:17.43	
3rd place, bronze medalist(s)	7	Rikke Møller Pedersen	Denmark	2:17.83	
4	3	Kierra Smith	Canada	2:18.30	
5	6	Shi Jinglin	China	2:18.64	
6	8	Mariia Astashkina	Russia	2:18.95	
7	1	Martha McCabe	Canada	2:19.17	
8	5	Vitalina Simonova	Russia	2:19.65	
