= Swimming at the 2014 Asian Games – Women's 200 metre breaststroke =

Event at the 2014 Asian Games

Women's 200 metre breaststroke at the 2014 Asian Games
- Venue: Munhak Park Tae-hwan Aquatics Center
- Date: 22 September 2014
- Competitors: 14 from 10 nations

Medalists
gold medal	Kanako Watanabe	Japan
silver medal	Rie Kaneto	Japan
bronze medal	Shi Jinglin	China

The women's 200 metre breaststroke event at the 2014 Asian Games took place on 22 September 2014 at Munhak Park Tae-hwan Aquatics Center.

== Schedule ==
All times are Korea Standard Time (UTC+09:00)

Date	Time	Event
Monday, 22 September 2014	09:00	Heats
Monday, 22 September 2014	19:57	Final

== Records ==
Prior to this competition, the existing world, Asian and Games records were as follows.

World Record	Rikke Møller Pedersen (DEN)	2:19.11	Barcelona, Spain	1 August 2013
Asian Record	Rie Kaneto (JPN); Satomi Suzuki (JPN)	2:20.72	Kumamoto, Japan; London, United Kingdom	6 September 2009; 2 August 2012
Games Record	Qi Hui (CHN)	2:23.93	Doha, Qatar	6 December 2006

== Results ==
=== Heats ===
Rank	Heat	Athlete	Time	Notes
1	1	Rie Kaneto (JPN)	2:25.42	
2	2	Kanako Watanabe (JPN)	2:27.17	
3	1	Back Su-yeon (KOR)	2:28.57	
4	2	Shi Jinglin (CHN)	2:29.43	
5	1	Zhang Xinyu (CHN)	2:30.70	
6	2	Kwon Min-ji (KOR)	2:33.11	
7	2	Phiangkhwan Pawapotako (THA)	2:33.28	
8	2	Lin Pei-wun (TPE)	2:33.80	
9	1	Jamie Yeung (HKG)	2:35.92	
10	1	Dariya Talanova (KGZ)	2:38.20	
11	1	Samantha Yeo (SIN)	2:38.52	
12	2	Yvette Kong (HKG)	2:44.44	
13	1	Fotimakhon Amilova (UZB)	2:47.83	
14	2	Aishath Sajina (MDV)	3:21.14	

=== Final ===
Rank	Athlete	Time	Notes
1st place, gold medalist(s)	Kanako Watanabe (JPN)	2:21.82	GR
2nd place, silver medalist(s)	Rie Kaneto (JPN)	2:21.92	
3rd place, bronze medalist(s)	Shi Jinglin (CHN)	2:23.58	
4	Back Su-yeon (KOR)	2:25.79	
5	Zhang Xinyu (CHN)	2:26.03	
6	Kwon Min-ji (KOR)	2:27.53	
7	Lin Pei-wun (TPE)	2:33.15	
8	Phiangkhwan Pawapotako (THA)	2:33.28	
