= Swimming at the 2014 Commonwealth Games – Women's 200 metre breaststroke =

Swimming championship

Women's 200 metre breaststroke at the 2014 Commonwealth Games
- Venue: Tollcross International Swimming Centre
- Dates: 26 July 2014
- Competitors: 26 from 15 nations
- Winning time: 2:22.36

Medalists
| gold medal | Taylor McKeown | Australia |
| silver medal | Sally Hunter | Australia |
| bronze medal | Molly Renshaw | England |

The women's 200 metre breaststroke event at the 2014 Commonwealth Games as part of the swimming programme took place on 26 July at the Tollcross International Swimming Centre in Glasgow, Scotland.

The medals were presented by Bruce Robertson, vice-president of the Commonwealth Games Federation and the quaichs were presented by Maureen Campbell, Director of Commonwealth Games Scotland and Chair of Scottish Swimming.

== Records ==
Prior to this competition, the existing world and Commonwealth Games records were as follows.

| World record | Rikke Møller Pedersen (DEN) | 2:19.11 | Barcelona, Spain | 1 August 2013 |
| Commonwealth record | Annamay Pierse (CAN) | 2:20.12 | Rome, Italy | 30 July 2009 |
| Games record | Leisel Jones (AUS) | 2:20.72 | Melbourne, Australia | 18 March 2006 |

== Results ==
=== Heats ===
| Rank | Heat | Lane | Name | Nationality | Time | Notes |
|---|---|---|---|---|---|---|
| 1 | 3 | 3 | Kierra Smith | Canada | 2:25.19 | Q |
| 2 | 3 | 5 | Molly Renshaw | England | 2:25.75 | Q |
| 3 | 4 | 4 | Taylor McKeown | Australia | 2:26.38 | Q |
| 4 | 4 | 5 | Sally Hunter | Australia | 2:26.69 | Q |
| 5 | 2 | 4 | Martha McCabe | Canada | 2:27.45 | Q |
| 6 | 2 | 5 | Tessa Wallace | Australia | 2:27.77 | Q |
| 7 | 4 | 6 | Hannah Miley | Scotland | 2:28.22 | Q |
| 8 | 4 | 3 | Alia Atkinson | Jamaica | 2:28.33 | Q |
| 9 | 2 | 3 | Tera van Beilen | Canada | 2:28.40 | |
| 10 | 2 | 6 | Chloe Tutton | Wales | 2:29.44 | |
| 11 | 3 | 4 | Sophie Taylor | England | 2:30.66 | |
| 12 | 4 | 2 | Sycerika McMahon | Northern Ireland | 2:31.98 | |
| 13 | 3 | 6 | Danielle Lowe | England | 2:33.88 | |
| 14 | 2 | 7 | Laura Kinley | Isle of Man | 2:36.25 | |
| 15 | 2 | 2 | Bethan Sloan | Wales | 2:36.98 | |
| 16 | 2 | 1 | Zara Bailey | Jamaica | 2:37.51 | |
| 17 | 4 | 7 | Samantha Yeo | Singapore | 2:38.12 | |
| 18 | 3 | 2 | Christina Loh | Malaysia | 2:38.68 | |
| 19 | 4 | 1 | Niamh Robinson | Isle of Man | 2:40.00 | |
| 20 | 3 | 1 | Irene Chrysostomou | Cyprus | 2:40.44 | |
| 21 | 3 | 7 | Nadia Adrianna Redza Goh | Malaysia | 2:41.94 | |
| 22 | 4 | 8 | Barbara Vali-Skelton | Papua New Guinea | 2:54.39 | |
| 23 | 1 | 4 | Anum Bandey | Pakistan | 2:54.81 | |
| 24 | 1 | 5 | Jocelyn Flynn | Papua New Guinea | 3:04.06 | |
| 25 | 1 | 3 | Aishath Sajina | Maldives | 3:19.00 | |
| | 3 | 8 | Izzy Joachim | Saint Vincent and the Grenadines | | DNS |

=== Final ===
| Rank | Lane | Name | Nationality | Time | Notes |
|---|---|---|---|---|---|
| 1st place, gold medalist(s) | 3 | Taylor McKeown | Australia | 2:22.36 | |
| 2nd place, silver medalist(s) | 6 | Sally Hunter | Australia | 2:23.33 | |
| 3rd place, bronze medalist(s) | 5 | Molly Renshaw | England | 2:25.00 | |
| =4 | 1 | Hannah Miley | Scotland | 2:25.40 | |
| =4 | 4 | Kierra Smith | Canada | 2:25.40 | |
| 6 | 2 | Martha McCabe | Canada | 2:25.46 | |
| 7 | 8 | Alia Atkinson | Jamaica | 2:25.48 | NR |
| 8 | 7 | Tessa Wallace | Australia | 2:27.41 | |
