= Swimming at the 2014 Asian Games – Women's 100 metre breaststroke =

Women's 100 metre breaststroke at the 2014 Asian Games
- Venue: Munhak Park Tae-hwan Aquatics Center
- Date: 21 September 2014
- Competitors: 20 from 14 nations

Medalists
gold medal	Shi Jinglin	China
silver medal	Kanako Watanabe	Japan
bronze medal	He Yun	China

The women's 100 metre breaststroke event at the 2014 Asian Games took place on 21 September 2014 at Munhak Park Tae-hwan Aquatics Center.

== Schedule ==
All times are Korea Standard Time (UTC+09:00)

Date	Time	Event
Sunday, 21 September 2014	09:00	Heats
Sunday, 21 September 2014	19:43	Final

== Records ==
Prior to this competition, the existing world, Asian and Games records were as follows.

World Record	Rūta Meilutytė (LTU)	1:04.35	Barcelona, Spain	29 July 2013
Asian Record	Ji Liping (CHN)	1:05.32	Beijing, China	29 August 2009
Games Record	Luo Xuejuan (CHN)	1:06.84	Busan, South Korea	1 October 2002

== Results ==
=== Heats ===
Rank	Heat	Athlete	Time	Notes
1	3	Kanako Watanabe (JPN)	1:08.18	
2	1	Shi Jinglin (CHN)	1:08.34	
3	2	Satomi Suzuki (JPN)	1:08.83	
4	2	Kwon Min-ji (KOR)	1:09.30	
5	3	He Yun (CHN)	1:09.95	
6	3	Yvette Kong (HKG)	1:10.50	
7	1	Yang Ji-won (KOR)	1:11.02	
8	2	Dariya Talanova (KGZ)	1:11.62	
9	3	Phiangkhwan Pawapotako (THA)	1:12.11	
10	2	Samantha Yeo (SIN)	1:12.28	
11	3	Lei On Kei (MAC)	1:12.71	
12	1	Jamie Yeung (HKG)	1:12.82	
13	1	Lin Pei-wun (TPE)	1:12.90	
14	2	Huang Wen-chi (TPE)	1:12.97	
15	2	Roanne Ho (SIN)	1:14.41	
16	1	Fotimakhon Amilova (UZB)	1:17.83	
17	2	Anushe Dinyar Engineer (PAK)	1:24.60	
18	3	Saintöriin Nomun (MGL)	1:25.38	
19	3	Sonira Bista (NEP)	1:32.24	
20	1	Aishath Sajina (MDV)	1:32.38	

=== Final ===
Rank	Athlete	Time	Notes
1st place, gold medalist(s)	Shi Jinglin (CHN)	1:06.67	GR
2nd place, silver medalist(s)	Kanako Watanabe (JPN)	1:06.80	
3rd place, bronze medalist(s)	He Yun (CHN)	1:08.11	
4	Satomi Suzuki (JPN)	1:08.61	
5	Kwon Min-ji (KOR)	1:09.19	
6	Yang Ji-won (KOR)	1:09.79	
7	Yvette Kong (HKG)	1:10.66	
8	Dariya Talanova (KGZ)	1:12.28	
