= Liu Xiaoyu =

Liu Xiaoyu is the name of:

- Liu Xiaoyu (basketball) (born 1989), Chinese professional basketball player
- Liu Xiaoyu (swimmer) (born 1988), Chinese international swimmer
- Bruce Liu (pianist) (born 1997), Canadian pianist
