= Sofiya Andreeva =

Russian swimmer

Personal information
- Full name: Sofiya Denisovna Andreeva
- Nationality: Russian
- Born: 2 August 1998 (age 27) Saint Petersburg, Russia

Sport
- Sport: Swimming
- Strokes: Breaststroke

Sofiya Denisovna Andreeva (Софья Денисовна Андреева; born 2 August 1998) is a Russian swimmer. She competed in the women's 200 metre breaststroke event at the 2016 Summer Olympics.
