= Shi Jinglin =

Chinese swimmer

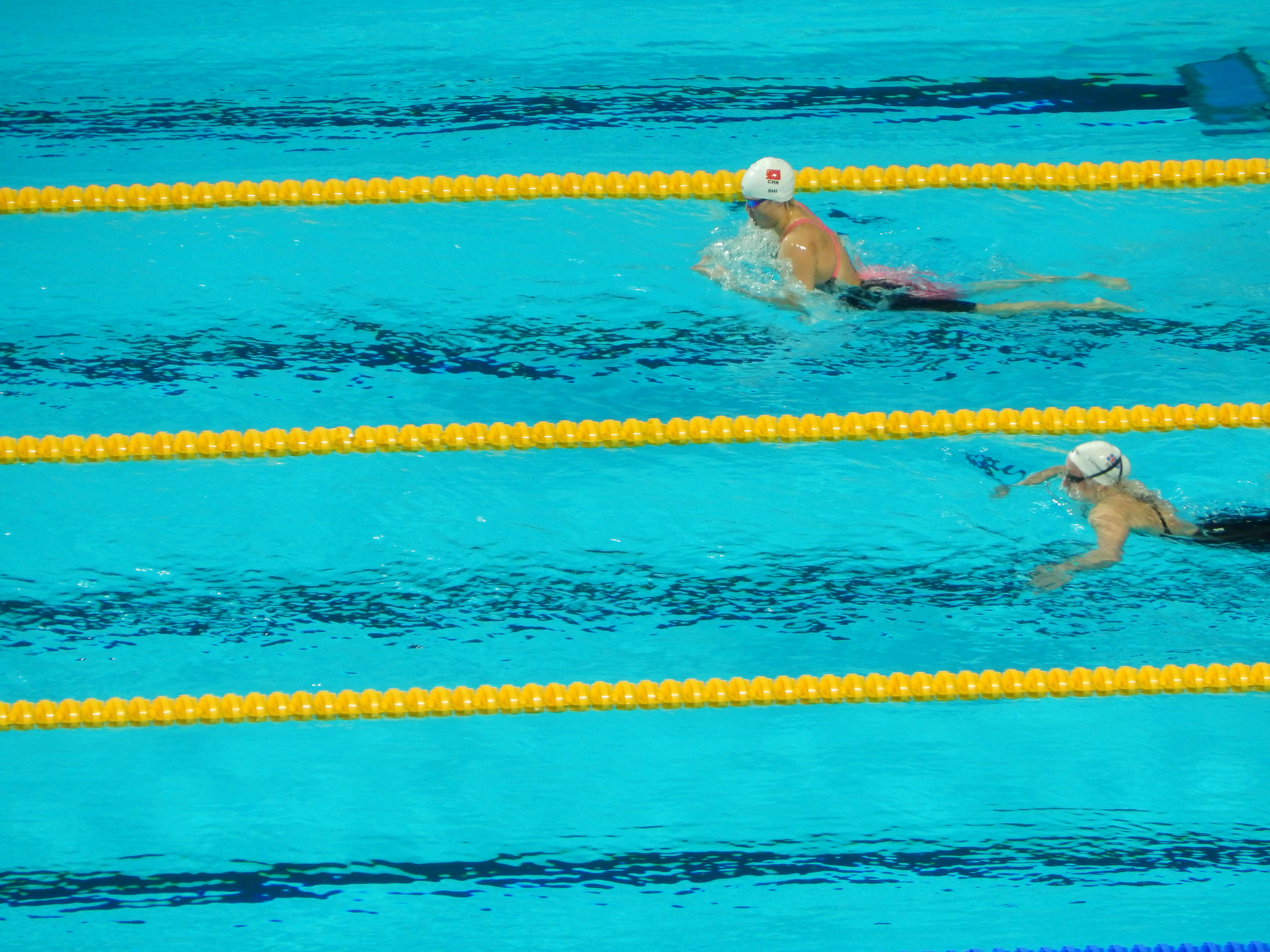
- Shi (left) with Hrafnhildur Lúthersdóttir (right) in Kazan

Personal information
- National team: China
- Born: 3 January 1993 (age 33) Nanjing, China
- Height: 1.75 m (5 ft 9 in)
- Weight: 68 kg (150 lb)

Sport
- Sport: Swimming
- Strokes: Breaststroke
- Club: Jiangsu Swimming Team
- Coach: Han Bingyan
Medal record
Women's swimming
Representing China
Olympic Games
Bronze medal – third place	2016 Rio de Janeiro	200 m breaststroke
World Championships (LC)
Gold medal – first place	2015 Kazan	4×100 m medley
Bronze medal – third place	2015 Kazan	200 m breaststroke
Bronze medal – third place	2017 Budapest	200 m breaststroke
Bronze medal – third place	2017 Budapest	4×100 m mixed medley
World Championships (SC)
Silver medal – second place	2018 Hangzhou	4×100 m medley
Asian Games
Gold medal – first place	2014 Incheon	100 m breaststroke
Gold medal – first place	2018 Jakarta	4×100 m mixed medley
Bronze medal – third place	2014 Incheon	200 m breaststroke
Bronze medal – third place	2018 Jakarta	100 m breaststroke

Shi Jinglin (Chinese: 史婧琳; pinyin: Shǐ Jìnglín; born 3 January 1993) is a Chinese competitive swimmer who specializes in the breaststroke events. She has produced a tally of five medals, two golds and three bronze, in major international competition, spanning the Olympic Games, Asian Games, and World Championships. At the 2014 Asian Games, Shi broke a meet record to claim the gold medal in the 100 m breaststroke.

== Career ==
Shi made her first Chinese team at the 2014 Asian Games in Incheon, South Korea, where she achieved two medals, a gold and a bronze, in swimming. She started off the meet by surpassing Japan's Kanako Watanabe in the first half of the race to smash the Asian Games record for a gold medal victory in the 100 m breaststroke with a time of 1:06.67, vaulting her up to eighth in the world rankings. The following day, in the 200 m breaststroke, Shi fell behind the Japanese duo Watanabe and Rie Kaneto in a sprint finish to claim the bronze at 2:23.58.

At the 2015 FINA World Championships in Kazan, Russia, Shi added two more medals, a gold and a bronze, to her career tally. In her first event, 100 m breaststroke, Shi lowered her personal best to 1:06.55 for a fifth-place finish in the final, missing out the podium by 0.13 seconds. Three days later, Shi swam a matching time of 2:22.76 in a three-way tie with Spain's Jessica Vall Montero and Denmark's world-record holder Rikke Møller Pedersen for a bronze in the 200 m breaststroke final. On the final night of the meet, Shi and her teammates Fu Yuanhui, Lu Ying, and Shen Duo put up a fast finish in 3:54.41 to claim the gold in the 4 × 100 m medley relay, just over two seconds away of the current meet record set by her team in 2009.
