= Daniah Hagul =

Libyan swimmer

Personal information
- Born: February 7, 1999 (age 27)

Sport
- Sport: Swimming

Daniah Hagul (born 7 February 1999) is a Libyan swimmer. She competed at the 2016 Summer Olympics in Rio de Janeiro. She was the only woman to compete for Libya at the 2016 Olympics.

== Early life ==
Hagul's parents, Bashir and Samira moved to Malta in the 1990s. The family would spend summer holiday's on Hagul's grandfather's farm in Azzahra, Libya. Hagul began swimming at age 3 or 4 and started seriously training in the sport at age 12 at the Neptunes Water Polo & Swimming Club of St Julians, Malta. She has earned entry into Mount Kelly school in the United Kingdom, a school which has produced a number of Olympic swimmers.

== Career ==
The political climate in Libya presented some obstacles to Hagul's competitive swimming career. In Libya, women are discouraged from wearing swimwear in public, making female competitive swimmers rare but not unprecedented. Following political upheaval in 2011, the Libyan Swimming Federation and Libyan Olympic Committee have struggled with funding. Swimming pools and clubs also became scarce in Libya after 2011. In spite of the challenges she faced, Hagul qualified for the FINA World Swimming Championships 2015 in Kazan, Russia where she competed in the 100 metre and the 50 metre breaststroke events. Hagul achieved a personal best time of 1:28.59 in the 100 metre breaststroke. She placed 68th in the event.

After her national swimming federation was not able to finance Hagul's trip to Rio de Janeiro for the Olympics. To finance the trip, Hagul turned to a crowdfunding campaign which proved successful. Hagul was the only woman to compete for Libya at the 2016 Summer Olympics in Rio de Janeiro. She competed at the 2016 Summer Olympics in the women's 100 metre breaststroke event; her time of 1:25.47 in the heats did not qualify her for the semifinals.
