= Teona Bostashvili =

Georgian swimmer

Personal information
- Born: January 19, 1998 (age 28)

Sport
- Sport: Swimming
- Strokes: Backstroke

Teona Bostashvili (born January 19, 1998) is a Georgian swimmer. She competed at the 2016 Summer Olympics in the women's 100 metre backstroke; her time of 1:22.91 in the heats did not qualify her for the semifinals.
