= Rechael Tonjor =

Nigerian swimmer (born 1991)

Personal information
- Born: 14 October 1991 (age 34)

Sport
- Sport: Swimming

Rechael Tonjor (born 14 October 1991) is a Nigerian swimmer. She competed in the women's 100 metre breaststroke event at the 2016 Summer Olympics.
