= Zhang Xinyu (swimmer) =

Chinese swimmer (born 1997)

Personal information
- Nationality: Chinese
- Born: 9 March 1997 (age 28); Yancheng, Jiangsu, China
- Height: 1.66 m (5 ft 5 in)

Sport
- Sport: Swimming

Zhang Xinyu (born 9 March 1997) is a Chinese swimmer. She competed in the women's 100 metre breaststroke event at the 2016 Summer Olympics.
