= Liu Xiaoyu (swimmer) =

Chinese swimmer

Personal information
- Born: June 25, 1988 (age 38) Shenyang, Liaoning

Sport
- Sport: Swimming

Liu Xiaoyu (simplified Chinese: 刘晓宇; traditional Chinese: 劉曉宇; pinyin: liú xiǎo yǔ; born 25 June 1988) is a Chinese female international swimmer. She competed for China at the 2012 London Olympics in the 100 m breaststroke.

== See also ==
- China at the 2012 Summer Olympics - Swimming
