= Ana Carla Carvalho =

Brazilian swimmer (born 1991)

Personal information
- Full name: Ana Carla Carvalho
- Nickname: Carlinha thumb
- Nationality: Brazil
- Born: February 14, 1991 (age 35) Guarapuava, Paraná, Brazil

Sport
- Sport: Swimming
- Strokes: Breaststroke
- Club: Clube Curitibano

Ana Carla Carvalho (born February 14, 1991, in Guarapuava) is a Brazilian swimmer.
