= Micah Lawrence =

American swimmer

Micah Sumrall
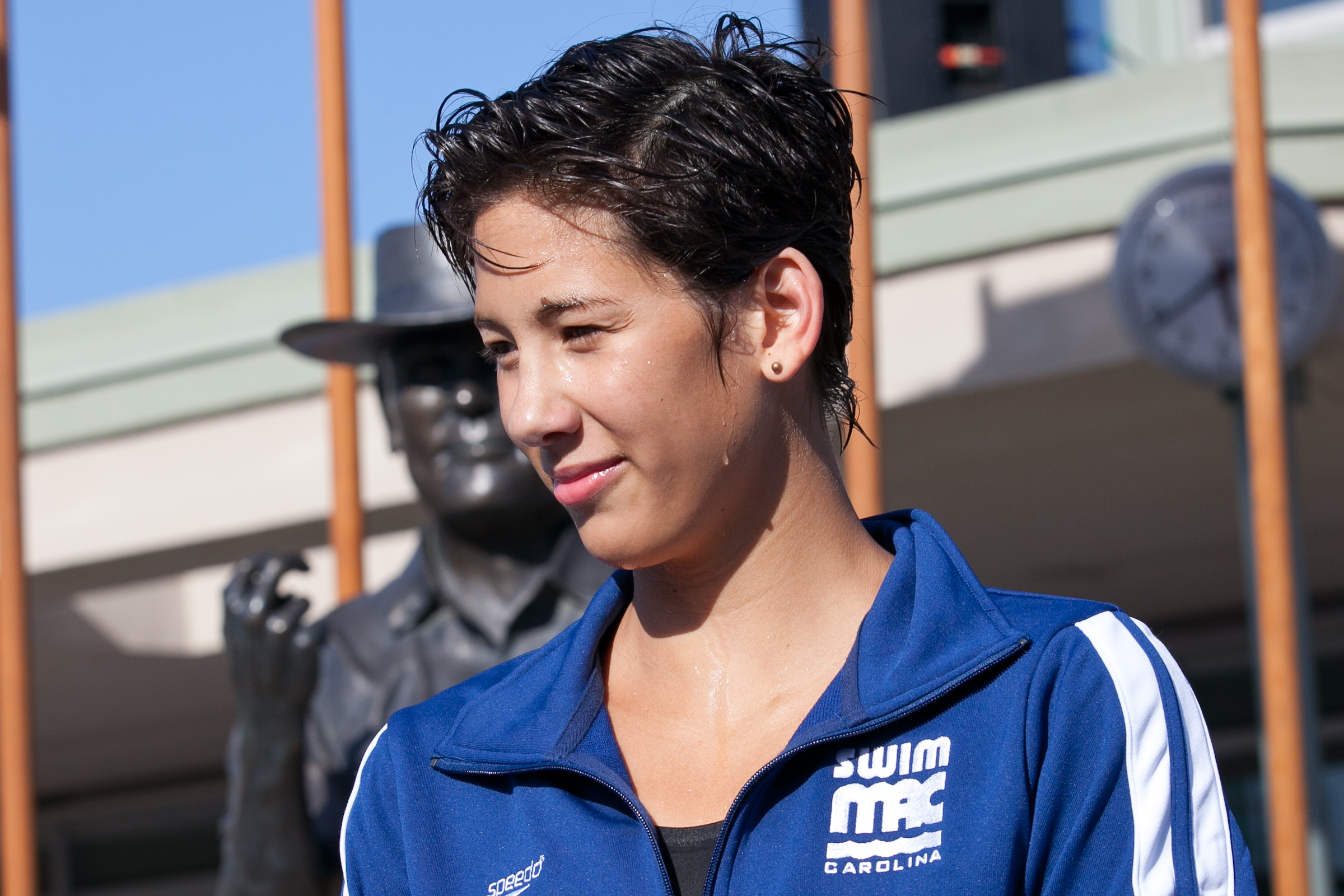
- Lawrence at the 2011 Santa Clara Invitational

Personal information
- Full name: Micah Lawrence Sumrall
- National team: United States
- Born: Micah Lawrence; July 20, 1990 (age 36) Las Cruces, New Mexico, U.S.
- Height: 6 ft 0 in (183 cm)
- Weight: 146 lb (66 kg) (2012)
- Spouse: Austin Sumrall (2017–present)

Sport
- Sport: Swimming
- Strokes: Breaststroke
- Club: Texas Gold
- College team: Auburn University
Medal record
Women's swimming
Representing the United States
World Championships (LC)
Silver medal – second place	2015 Kazan	200 m breaststroke
Bronze medal – third place	2013 Barcelona	200 m breaststroke
Pan Pacific Championships
Gold medal – first place	2018 Tokyo	200 m breaststroke

Micah Sumrall (née Lawrence, born July 20, 1990) is an American competition swimmer who specializes in the breaststroke. She was a member of the 2012 United States Olympic team, and finished sixth in the world in the 200-meter breaststroke event at the 2012 Summer Olympics.

== Early years ==
Lawrence was born in Las Cruces, New Mexico, but grew up in Pflugerville, Texas and swam for Texas Gold. She attended Pflugerville High School. She was the runner-up in the 100-yard breaststroke and 200-yard individual medley at the Texas state championships. She grew up in an athletic family; Her two older sisters were college swimmers for New Mexico State University and her youngest sister swam for Northern Michigan University. While still in high school, Lawrence became a national junior team member in 2007. After graduating from high school, she finished 36th in the 100-meter breaststroke and fourteenth in the 200-meter breaststroke at the 2008 U.S. Olympic Trials.

== College career ==
Lawrence received an athletic scholarship to attend Auburn University in Auburn, Alabama, where she swam for the Auburn Tigers swimming and diving team in National Collegiate Athletic Association (NCAA) competition from 2009 to 2011. During her three years as an Auburn swimmer, she won the Southeastern Conference (SEC) championship in the 100-yard breaststroke in 2010, and finished second in the same event, by one one-hundredth (0.01) of a second, at the NCAA national championships in 2011. She was also a member of two of Auburn's SEC championship relay teams in the 4x100-yard medley relay. She earned two All-American honors during her college career. Lawrence graduated from Queens University of Charlotte after transferring to the institution and training for the 2012 Olympic Games in the Levine Aquatic Center.

== National and international career ==
Lawrence also competed at the 2009 USA Swimming National Championships, finishing twelfth in the 100-meter breaststroke (1:09.40), and seventeenth in the 200-meter breaststroke (2:29.72). At the 2010 National Swimming Championships, she finished third in the 100-meter breaststroke (1:08.48), and eighth in the 200-meter breaststroke (2:29.70). As a result of her performance at the 2010 nationals, she was selected for the 2010–11 USA Swimming National Team. She represented the United States at the 2010 Pan Pacific Swimming Championships, finishing tenth in the 100-meter breaststroke (1:07.85), ninth in the 200-meter breaststroke (2:25.19), and eighth in the 50-meter breaststroke (32.07).

Following her junior year in 2010–11 at Auburn, she decided to take a year off from school and began to train full-time for the 2012 Olympics with former Auburn head coach David Marsh at SwimMAC Carolina. At the 2012 United States Olympic Trials in Omaha, Nebraska, the qualifying meet for the 2012 Olympics, Lawrence qualified for the U.S. Olympic team for the first time by placing second in the 200-meter breaststroke behind Rebecca Soni. At the 2012 Summer Olympics in London, she finished sixth in the final of the 200-meter breaststroke. At the 2013 World Championships, Lawrence finished 3rd to win the bronze medal in the 200m breaststroke final. Two years later at the 2015 World Championships, she won the silver medal in the 200m breaststroke.

== Personal life ==
Lawrence married Austin Sumrall on January 27, 2017, in Austin, Texas.

== See also ==
- Auburn Tigers
- List of Auburn University people
