= Kanako Watanabe =

Japanese swimmer (born 1996)

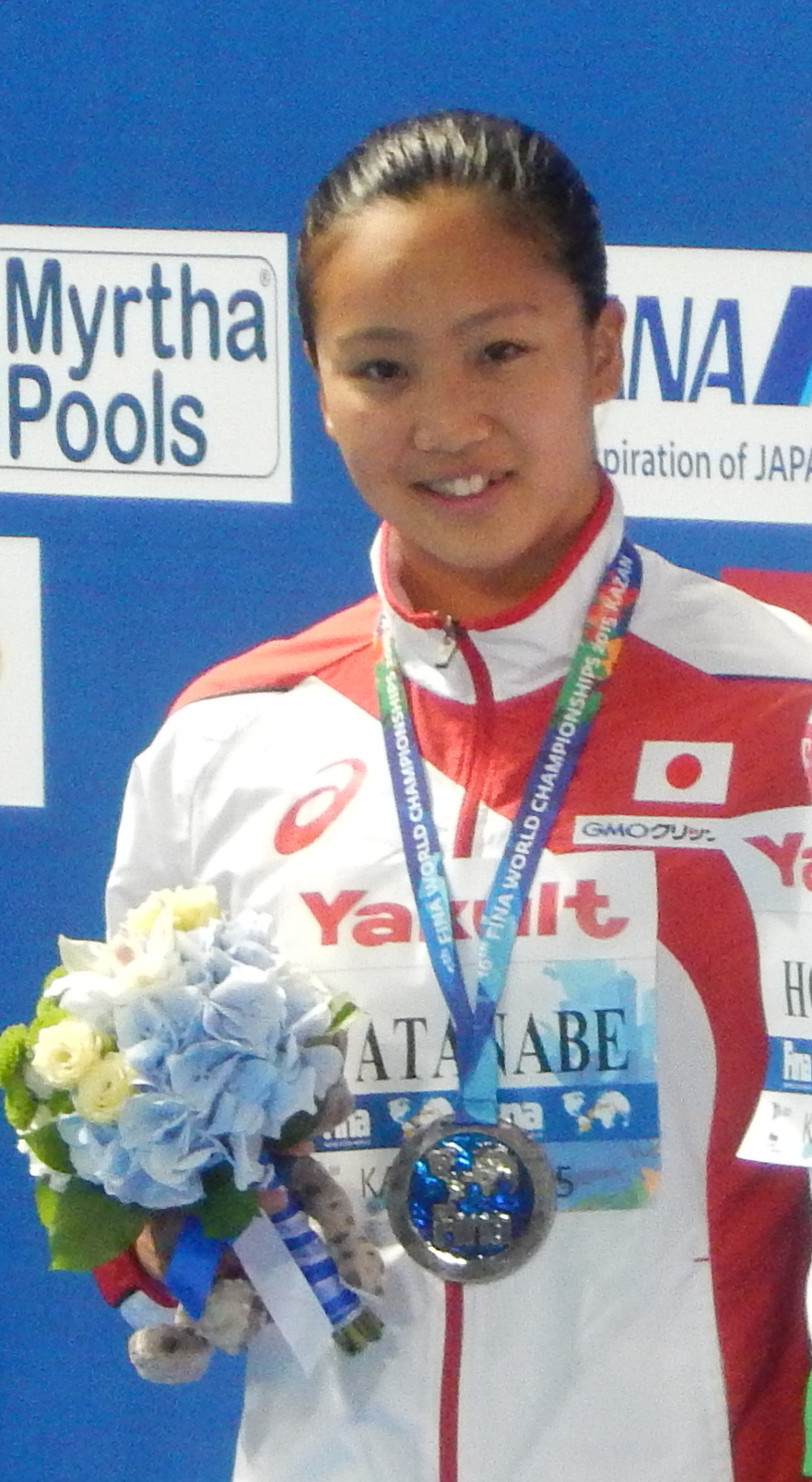
- Watanabe wins silver in Kazan

Personal information
- Full name: Kanako Watanabe
- National team: Japan
- Born: 15 November 1996 (age 29) Tokyo, Japan
- Height: 1.64 m (5 ft 5 in)
- Weight: 54 kg (119 lb)

Sport
- Sport: Swimming
- Strokes: Breaststroke, medley
Medal record
Women's swimming
Representing Japan
World Championships (LC)
Gold medal – first place	2015 Kazan	200 m breaststroke
Silver medal – second place	2015 Kazan	200 m medley
World Championships (SC)
Gold medal – first place	2014 Doha	200 m breaststroke
Bronze medal – third place	2012 Istanbul	200 m breaststroke
Bronze medal – third place	2014 Doha	4×100 m medley
Pan Pacific Championships
Gold medal – first place	2014 Gold Coast	200 m breaststroke
Silver medal – second place	2014 Gold Coast	100 m breaststroke
Asian Games
Gold medal – first place	2014 Incheon	200 m breaststroke
Gold medal – first place	2014 Incheon	4×100 m medley
Gold medal – first place	2018 Jakarta	200 m breaststroke
Silver medal – second place	2014 Incheon	100 m breaststroke
Silver medal – second place	2014 Incheon	200 m medley
Silver medal – second place	2014 Incheon	4×100 m freestyle
Summer Universiade
Gold medal – first place	2017 Taipei	100 m breaststroke
Gold medal – first place	2017 Taipei	200 m breaststroke
Gold medal – first place	2017 Taipei	4×100 m medley
Silver medal – second place	2019 Naples	4×100 m freestyle
Bronze medal – third place	2019 Naples	100 m breaststroke
Bronze medal – third place	2019 Naples	200 m breaststroke
World Junior Championships
Gold medal – first place	2011 Lima	200 m breaststroke
Gold medal – first place	2011 Lima	4×100 m medley
Silver medal – second place	2011 Lima	100 m breaststroke

Kanako Watanabe (渡部 香生子, Watanabe Kanako; born 15 November 1996) is a Japanese competitive swimmer who specializes in the breaststroke. She competed in the 2012 London Olympics at the age of 15 for the 200m Women's Breaststroke event. She again competed in the 2016 Summer Olympics in Rio De Janeiro.

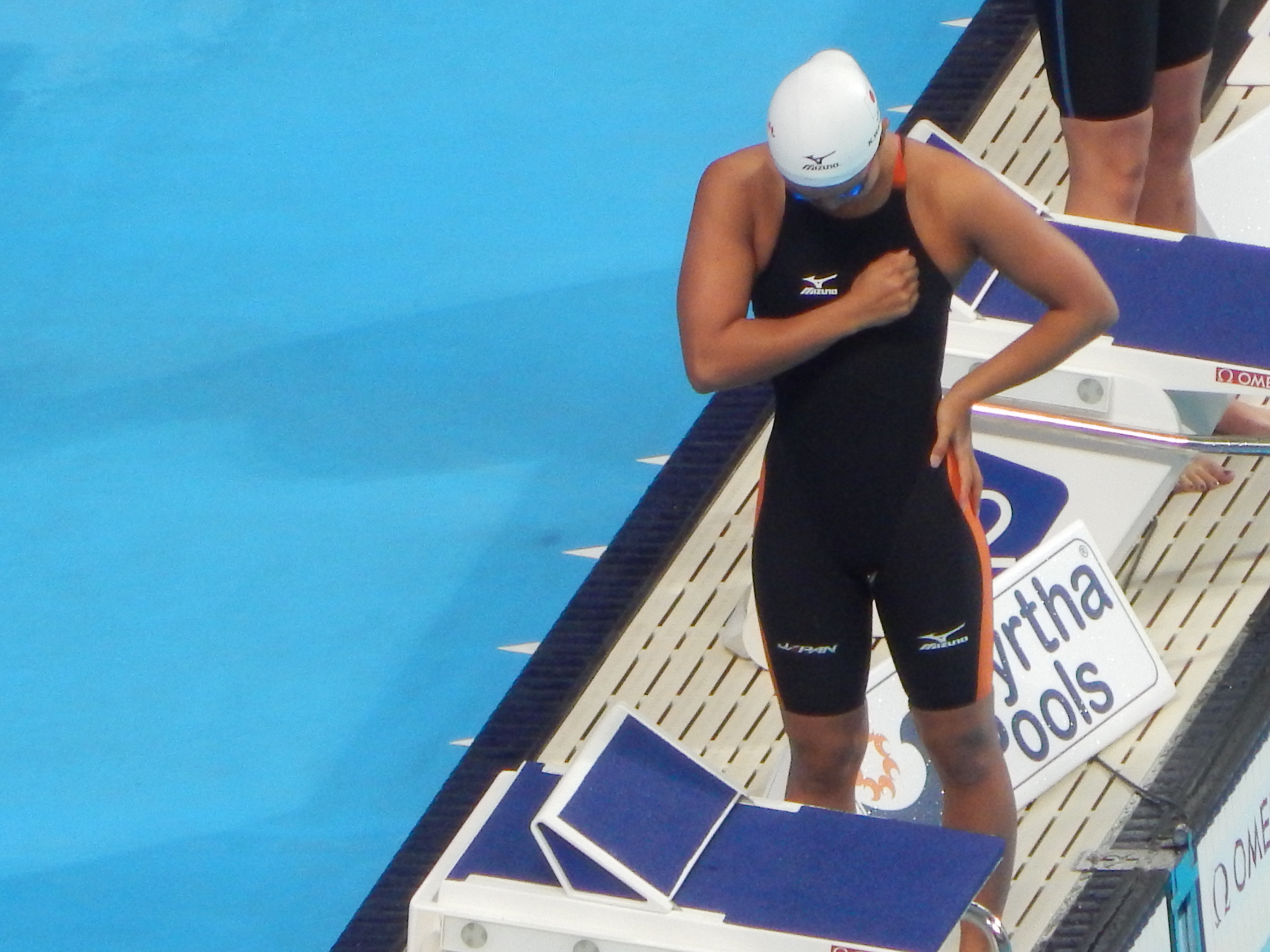
Kazan 2015

Her swimming coach is Ryuji Omi. She is the daughter of Keiji and Emiko Watanabe.

Watanabe won the silver medal in the 200m medley at the 2015 World Aquatics Championships in Kazan, Russia. She also won a gold medal in the 200 metres breaststroke, and she gave the gold medal to her coach, in a gesture of gratitude to him.

She has qualified to represent Japan at the 2020 Summer Olympics.

Records
Preceded by Rozaliya Nasretdinova, Dmitry Ermakov, Artem Lobuzov, Maria Reznikova	Mixed 4 × 50 metres freestyle relay world record-holder 18 October 2013 – 21 October 2013; With: Shinri Shioura, Sayaka Akase, Kenta Ito	Succeeded by Florent Manaudou, Jérémy Stravius, Mélanie Henique, Anna Santamans
