= Taylor McKeown =

Australian swimmer (born 1995)

Personal information
- Full name: Taylor McKeown
- National team: Australia
- Born: 17 March 1995 (age 31) Redcliffe, Queensland
- Height: 1.8 m (5 ft 11 in)
- Weight: 67 kg (148 lb)

Sport
- Sport: Swimming
- Strokes: Breaststroke
- Club: Griffith University
- Coach: Michael Bohl
Medal record
Women's swimming
Representing Australia
Olympic Games
Silver medal – second place	2016 Rio de Janeiro	4×100 m medley
World Championships (LC)
Bronze medal – third place	2015 Kazan	4×100 m medley
Bronze medal – third place	2017 Budapest	4×100 m medley
Pan Pacific Championships
Bronze medal – third place	2014 Gold Coast	200 m breaststroke
Commonwealth Games
Gold medal – first place	2014 Glasgow	200 m breaststroke
World Junior Championships
Bronze medal – third place	2011 Lima	4×200 m freestyle

Taylor McKeown (born 17 March 1995) is an Australian former competitive swimmer. She won a gold medal in the 200 metre breaststroke at the 2014 Commonwealth Games, and a silver medal at the 4 × 100 m medley relay during the 2016 Summer Olympics. McKeown also represented Australia in both the 100m breaststroke, and 200m breaststroke, qualifying fastest for the final and finishing in 5th in the 2016 Summer Olympics in Rio. She is a University of Sunshine Coast student.

In 2010, McKeown won her first national titles in the 100m and 200m breaststroke at the age of 15. Since then McKeown has dominated breaststroke and individual medley events throughout the age group swimming years. She won multiple medals and representing Australia on many junior teams events.

McKeown injured her knee prior to the 2018 Gold Coast Commonwealth Games which required surgery. McKeown struggled throughout 2018 and left her coach of 13 years. She settled on the Gold Coast in early 2019 training with her new coach Michael Bohl,

McKeown is the older sister of Olympic champion swimmer, Kaylee McKeown. After the 2022 Commonwealth Games in Birmingham, McKeown announced her retirement from competitive swimming.
