= Rie Kaneto =

Japanese swimmer (born 1988)

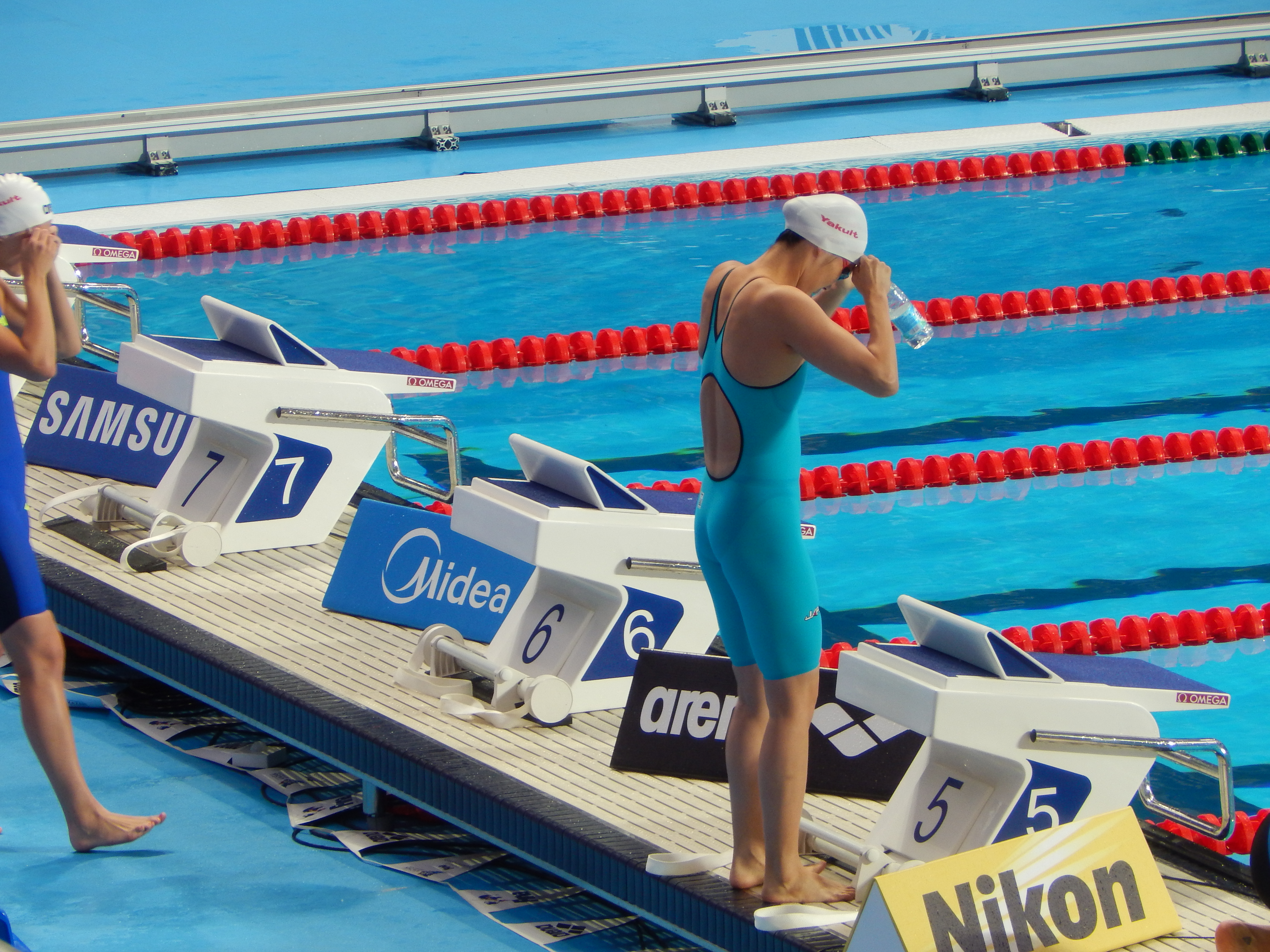
- Kazan 2015

Personal information
- Full name: Rie Kaneto
- National team: Japan
- Born: 8 September 1988 (age 37) Shobara, Hiroshima, Japan
- Height: 174 cm (5 ft 9 in)
- Weight: 67 kg (148 lb)

Sport
- Sport: Swimming
- Strokes: Breaststroke
- Club: Tokai SC
- Coach: Tsuyoshi Kato
Medal record
Women's swimming
Representing Japan
Olympic Games
Gold medal – first place	2016 Rio de Janeiro	200 m breaststroke
World Championships (SC)
Silver medal – second place	2014 Doha	200 m breaststroke
Pan Pacific Championships
Silver medal – second place	2014 Gold Coast	200 m breaststroke
Asian Games
Silver medal – second place	2014 Incheon	200 m breaststroke
Universiade
Gold medal – first place	2009 Belgrade	200 m breaststroke
Silver medal – second place	2007 Bangkok	200 m breaststroke

Rie Kaneto (金藤 理絵, Kanetō Rie; born 8 September 1988) is a Japanese competitive swimmer who specializes in breaststroke events. She won the gold medal in the 200 meter breaststroke at the 2016 Summer Olympics.

== Career ==
She represented her nation Japan, as a 19-year-old junior, at the 2008 Summer Olympics and has won a career total of four medals in a major international competition, spanning two editions of the Summer Universiade (2007 and 2009), the Short Course Worlds, and the Pan Pacific Championships. Apart from her Olympic career, Kaneto also demolished both a Japanese and Asian record of 2:20.72 at the Japan University Championships in Kumamoto. Kaneto is a physical education graduate at Tokai University in Hiroshima.

Rie made her international swimming debut at the 2007 Summer Universiade in Bangkok, Thailand, quickly claiming a silver medal in the 200 m breaststroke by less than 0.04 of a second behind South Korea's Jung Seul-ki in 2:25.63. Rie's best effort at these Games vaulted her up to twelfth in the world rankings.

Rie earned her first selection to the Japanese team to compete in the women's 200 m breaststroke at the 2008 Summer Olympics in Beijing. Leading up to the Games, she placed second behind Megumi Taneda at the Olympic trials in Tokyo with a FINA A-standard entry time of 2:26.28. Kaneto touched out Taneda to take the seventh spot in the final by nine hundredths of a second (0.09), in an outstanding time of 2:25.14.

At the 2009 Summer Universiade in Belgrade, Serbia, Rie set an Asian and Japanese mark of 2:22.32 to claim the 200 m breaststroke title, just a single hundredth margin off her record from the national championships (2:22.33).

In 2010, Rie surprisingly missed out the podium in the 200 m breaststroke at the Asian Games in Guangzhou, China, when she placed fourth behind two Chinese swimmers and new champion Jeong Da-rae of South Korea in 2:25.63.

In March 2018 Rie retired from competitive swimming.

Awards
Preceded by Emily Seebohm	Pacific Rim Swimmer of the Year; 2016	Succeeded by Emily Seebohm
