= Yvette Kong =

Hong Kong swimmer (born 1993)

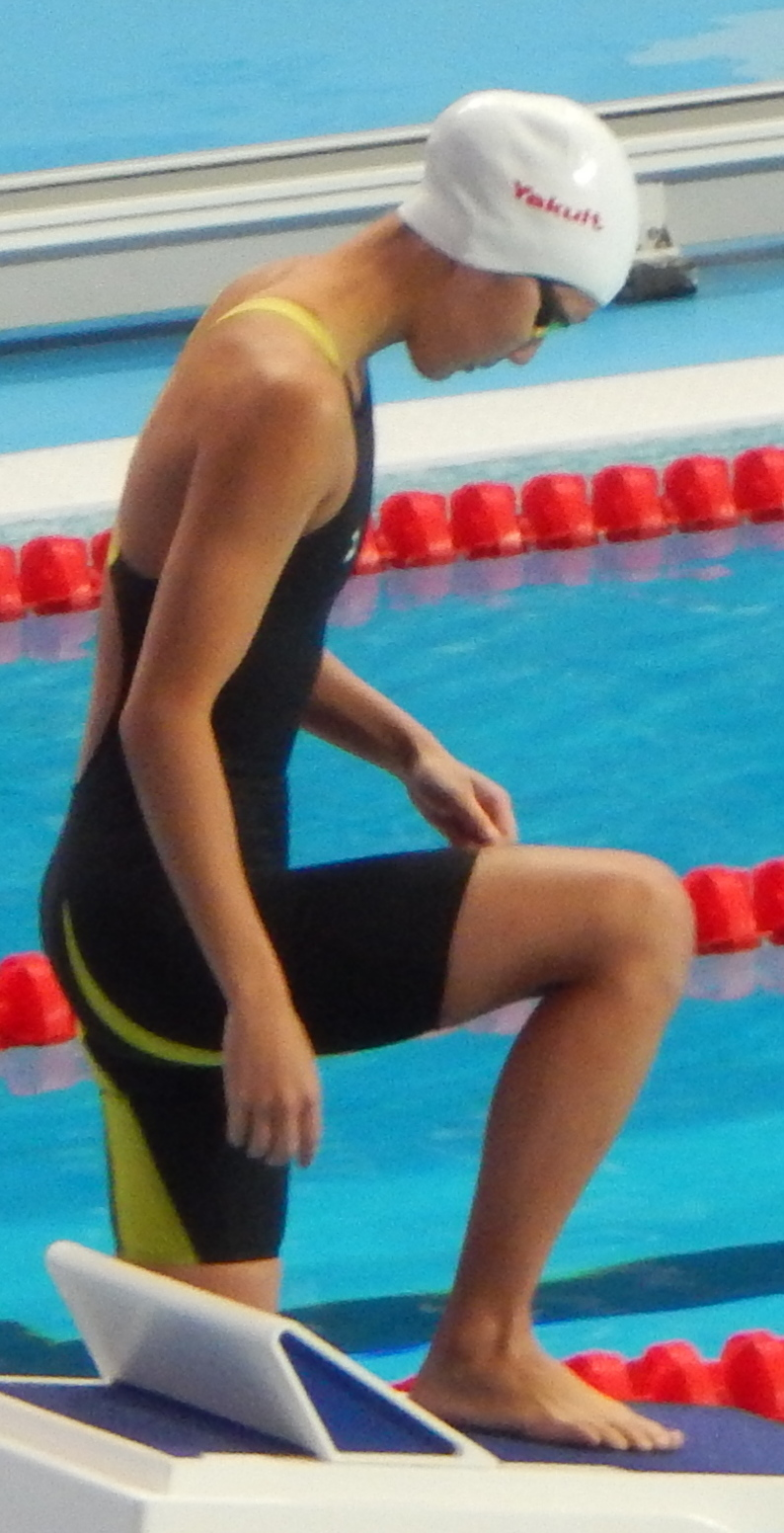

Personal information
- Full name: Yvette Man-Yi Kong
- Nationality: Chinese
- Born: 18 January 1993 (age 33) Toronto, Canada
- Height: 176 cm (5 ft 9 in)
- Weight: 60 kg (132 lb)

Sport
- Country: Hong Kong
- Sport: Swimming
- Strokes: Breaststroke
- College team: University of California, Berkeley
- Club: Peter
- Team: peter
- Coached by: Yvette JO
Medal record
Women's swimming
Representing Hong Kong
Asian Games
Bronze medal – third place	2014 Incheon	4×100 m medley
East Asian Games
Silver medal – second place	2009 Hong Kong	4×200 m freestyle
Bronze medal – third place	2009 Hong Kong	4×100 m medley
Asian Championships
Silver medal – second place	2009 Foshan	4×100 m freestyle
Bronze medal – third place	2009 Foshan	100 m breaststroke
Bronze medal – third place	2009 Foshan	4×200 m freestyle
Bronze medal – third place	2009 Foshan	4×100 m medley

Yvette Kong (born 18 January 1993) is a Hong Kong competitive Olympic swimmer.

She qualified to the 2016 Summer Olympics in Rio de Janeiro, and was selected to represent Hong Kong in the women's 100 metre breaststroke, 200 metre breaststroke, and 4x100 metre medley relay.

== Family ==
Yvette is the cousin of Hong Kong singer Shiga Lin.
