= Dariya Talanova =

Kyrgyzstani swimmer (born 1995)

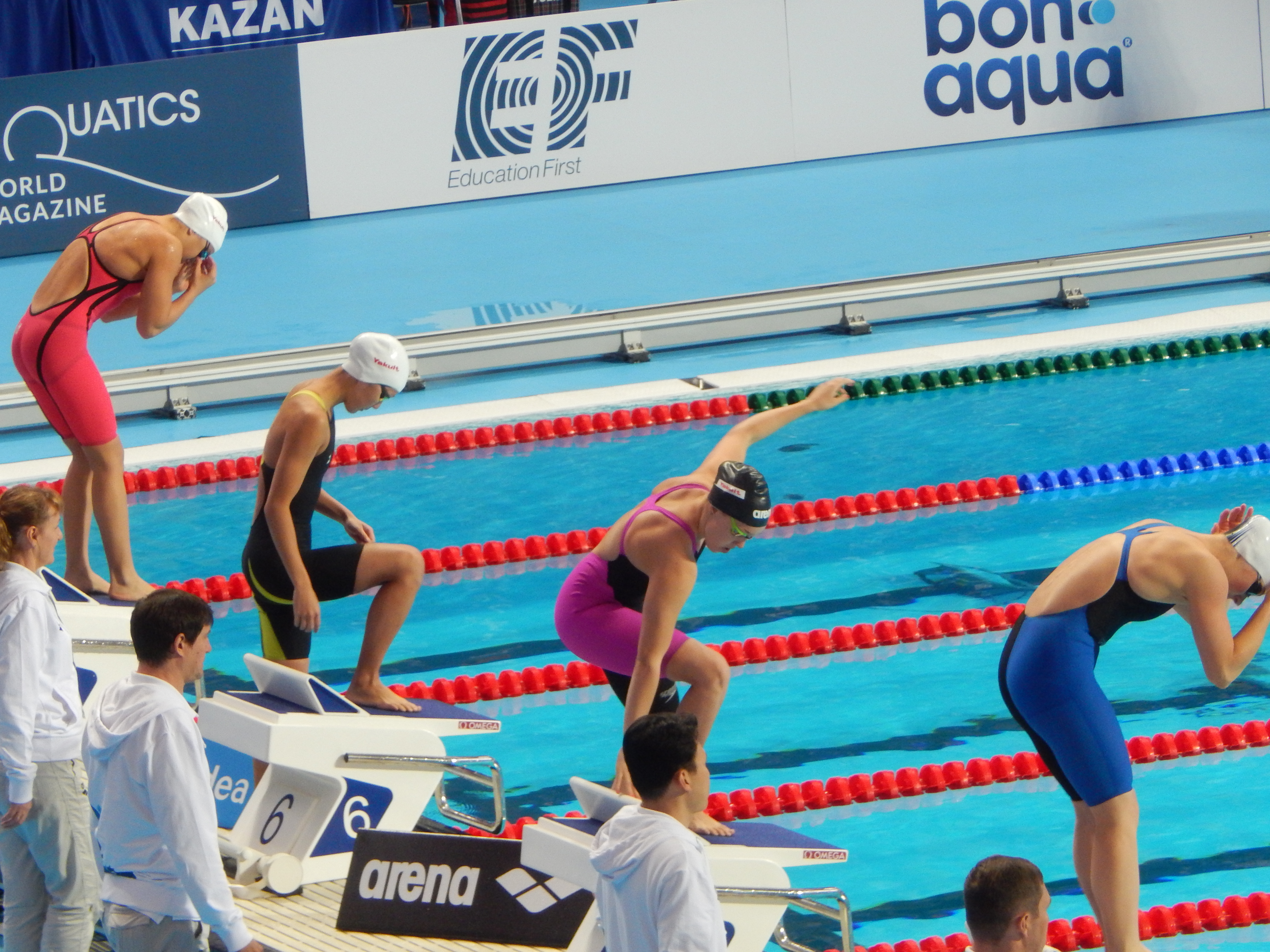
- Talanova (2nd right) at the 2015 World Championships

Personal information
- Born: 8 December 1995 (age 30) Bishkek, Kyrgyzstan
- Height: 1.68 m (5 ft 6 in)
- Weight: 52 kg (115 lb)

Sport
- Sport: Swimming

Dariya Talanova (born 8 December 1995) is a Kyrgyzstani breaststroke swimmer. At the 2012 Summer Olympics, she competed in the 200 m breaststroke, finishing in 34th (last) place overall in the heats.
