= Rikke Møller Pedersen =

Danish swimmer (born 1989)

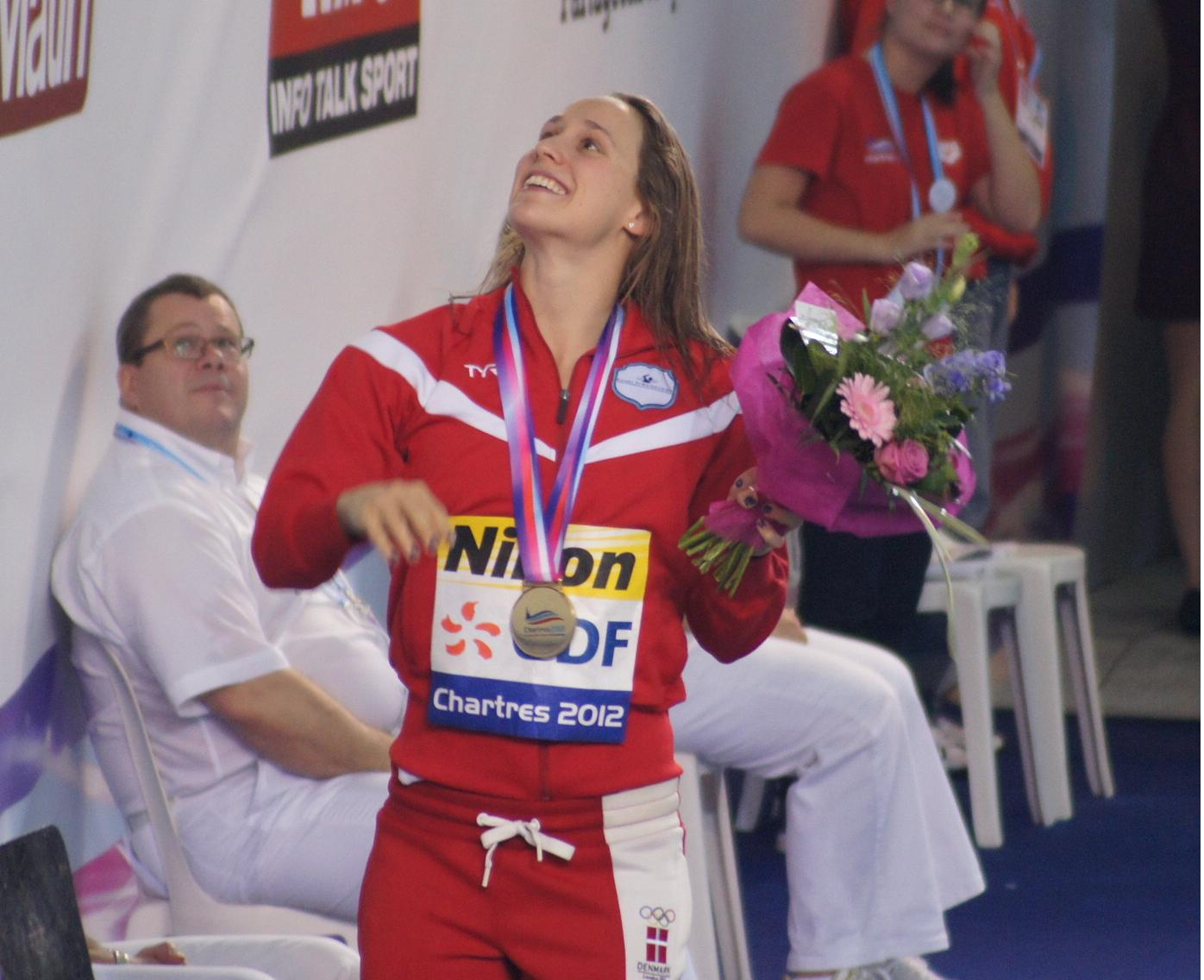
- Møller Pedersen at the 2012 European Short Course Championships in Chartres

Personal information
- National team: Denmark
- Born: 9 January 1989 (age 37) Odense, Denmark
- Height: 175 cm (5 ft 9 in)

Sport
- Sport: Swimming
- Strokes: Breaststroke
- Club: Herning Svømmeklub / NTC
- Coach: Shannon Rollason
Medal record
Women's swimming
Representing Denmark
Event	1st	2nd	3rd
Olympic Games	0	0	1
World Championships (LC)	0	1	1
World Championships (SC)	4	0	3
European Championships (LC)	4	2	1
European Championships (SC)	8	5	0
Total	16	8	6
Olympic Games
Bronze medal – third place	2016 Rio de Janeiro	4×100 m medley
World Championships (LC)
Silver medal – second place	2013 Barcelona	200 m breaststroke
Bronze medal – third place	2015 Kazan	200 m breaststroke
World Championships (SC)
Gold medal – first place	2012 Istanbul	200 m breaststroke
Gold medal – first place	2012 Istanbul	4×100 m medley
Gold medal – first place	2014 Doha	4×50 m medley
Gold medal – first place	2014 Doha	4×100 m medley
Bronze medal – third place	2010 Dubai	200 m breaststroke
Bronze medal – third place	2012 Istanbul	100 m breaststroke
Bronze medal – third place	2014 Doha	200 m breaststroke
European Championships (LC)
Gold medal – first place	2014 Berlin	100 m breaststroke
Gold medal – first place	2014 Berlin	200 m breaststroke
Gold medal – first place	2014 Berlin	4×100 m medley
Gold medal – first place	2016 London	200 m breaststroke
Silver medal – second place	2010 Budapest	100 m breaststroke
Silver medal – second place	2018 Glasgow	4×100 m medley
Bronze medal – third place	2010 Budapest	200 m breaststroke
European Championships (SC)
Gold medal – first place	2009 Istanbul	200 m breaststroke
Gold medal – first place	2011 Szczecin	200 m breaststroke
Gold medal – first place	2011 Szczecin	4×50 m medley
Gold medal – first place	2012 Chartres	100 m breaststroke
Gold medal – first place	2012 Chartres	200 m breaststroke
Gold medal – first place	2012 Chartres	4×50 m medley
Gold medal – first place	2013 Herning	200 m breaststroke
Gold medal – first place	2013 Herning	4×50 m medley
Silver medal – second place	2011 Szczecin	100 m breaststroke
Silver medal – second place	2012 Chartres	50 m breaststroke
Silver medal – second place	2013 Herning	100 m breaststroke
Silver medal – second place	2017 Copenhagen	200 m breaststroke
Silver medal – second place	2017 Copenhagen	4×50 m medley

Rikke Møller Pedersen (born 9 January 1989) is a Danish retired competitive swimmer who specialised in breaststroke. She held the 200 m breaststroke world record (long course) from 2013 to 2021.

== Career ==
In 2009, Møller Pedersen won a gold medal in the 200 m breaststroke at the European Short Course Swimming Championships.

In 2010, she won a Bronze Medal in the 200 m breaststroke at the World Short Course Swimming Championships, while she placed second in the 100 m breaststroke and third in the 200 m breaststroke at the European Aquatics Championships.

At the 2011 European Short Course Swimming Championships, she won two gold medals, in the 4×50 m medley relay and in the 200 m breaststroke respectively, and a Silver Medal in the 100 m breaststroke.

In 2012, Møller Pedersen competed at the Summer Olympics for the first time. At the 2012 European Short Course Swimming Championships in Chartres she placed first in the 100 m breaststroke and she set the European record with a time of 1:04.12. In this edition of the European Short Course Championships, she also won the 200 m breaststroke and the 4×50 m medley relay events, while she placed second in the 50 m breaststroke.

At the 2012 World Short Course Swimming Championships in Istanbul, she won the 200 m breaststroke event with a winning time of 2:16.08, the new championship record. In Istanbul, she also placed third in the 100 m breaststroke and first in the 4 × 100 m medley relay.

At the 2013 Danish Open Championships, she broke the European record in the 200 m breaststroke (long course) swimming in 2:20.53. The previous record belonged to Russian Yuliya Yefimova who had set a time of 2:20.92 at the 2012 London Olympics.

At the 2013 World Aquatics Championships, Møller Pedersen broke Rebecca Soni's 200 m breaststroke world record in the semifinals with 2:19.11, but she finished 2nd in the final behind Russian Yuliya Yefimova with a time of 2:20.08.

At the 2016 Summer Olympics in Rio de Janeiro, she won a bronze medal as a part of the 4 × 100 m medley relay alongside Jeanette Ottesen, Mie Ø. Nielsen and Pernille Blume. Here they also broke the European record with a time of 3:55.01.

In April 2017 Rikke Møller Pedersen competed in the Danish Open national qualifiers for the upcoming World Championships in Budapest. She took part in the 100 m breaststroke event and finished first with a time of 1:07.33, which qualified her for the World Championships.

Rikke Møller Pedersen competed in the 2017 Stockholm Swim Cup. In the 50 m breaststroke event she finished third with a time of 31.45. She won the 200 m breaststroke event by posting a time of 2:25.59.

After a distinguished career spanning over several Olympic Games, she announced her retirement in January 2019 via posts on her Facebook and Instagram profiles.

Records
Preceded by Rebecca Soni	World Record Holder; Women's 200 Breaststroke; 1 August 2013 – 30 July 2021	Succeeded by Tatjana Schoenamker
Preceded by Valentina Artemyeva	European Record Holder; Women's 100 Breaststroke (25m); 25 October 2009 – 15 December 2012	Succeeded by Rūta Meilutytė
