= Kierra Smith =

Canadian swimmer (born 1994)

Personal information
- National team: Canada
- Born: February 1, 1994 (age 32) Vancouver, British Columbia, Canada
- Height: 1.50 m (4 ft 11 in)
- Weight: 57 kg (126 lb)

Sport
- Sport: Swimming
- Strokes: Breaststroke
- Club: Energy Standard
Medal record
Women's swimming
Representing Canada
World Championships (LC)
Bronze medal – third place	2019 Gwangju	4×100 m medley
Pan American Games
Gold medal – first place	2015 Toronto	200 m breaststroke
Silver medal – second place	2011 Guadalajara	4×100 m medley
Silver medal – second place	2015 Toronto	4×100 m medley
Commonwealth Games
Silver medal – second place	2018 Gold Coast	4×100 m medley
Silver medal – second place	2018 Gold Coast	100 m breaststroke
Junior Pan Pacific Championships
Gold medal – first place	2012 Honolulu	100 m breaststroke
Gold medal – first place	2012 Honolulu	200 m breaststroke
Silver medal – second place	2012 Honolulu	4×100 m medley

Kierra Smith (born February 1, 1994) is a Canadian breaststroke swimmer. She won a gold medal in the 200 m breaststroke at the 2015 Pan American Games and a silver medal in the 200m breaststroke at the 2018 Commonwealth Games.

== Career ==
=== 2016 season ===
In 2016, she was officially named to Canada's Olympic team for the 2016 Summer Olympics.

=== 2017 season ===
In September 2017, Smith was named to Canada's 2018 Commonwealth Games team.

=== International Swimming League ===
In the Autumn of 2019 she was member of the inaugural International Swimming League swimming for the Energy Standard International Swim Club, who won the team title in Las Vegas, Nevada, in December.

=== 2020 season ===
In June 2021, Smith was officially named to Canada's Olympic team for the 2020 Summer Olympics (which took place in 2021 due to the COVID-19 Pandemic)
