= 2018 Pan Pacific Swimming Championships – Women's 200 metre breaststroke =

Women's 200 metre breaststroke at the 2018 Pan Pacific Swimming Championships
- Venue: Tokyo Tatsumi International Swimming Center
- Dates: 12 August (heats & finals)
- Competitors: 16 from 6 nations
- Winning time: 2:21.88

Medalists
gold medal	Micah Sumrall	United States
silver medal	Lilly King	United States
bronze medal	Satomi Suzuki	Japan

The women's 200 metre breaststroke competition at the 2018 Pan Pacific Swimming Championships took place on August 12 at the Tokyo Tatsumi International Swimming Center. The defending champion was Kanako Watanabe of Japan.

== Records ==
Prior to this competition, the existing world and Pan Pacific records were as follows:

World record	Rikke Møller Pedersen (DEN)	2:19.11	Barcelona, Spain	1 August 2013
Pan Pacific Championships record	Rebecca Soni (USA)	2:20.69	Irvine, United States	21 August 2010

== Results ==
All times are in minutes and seconds.

KEY:	QA	Qualified A Final	QB	Qualified B Final	CR	Championships record	NR	National record	PB	Personal best	SB	Seasonal best

=== Heats ===
The first round was held on 12 August from 10:00.

Only two swimmers from each country may advance to the A or B final. If a country not qualify any swimmer to the A final, that same country may qualify up to three swimmers to the B final.

Rank	Name	Nationality	Time	Notes
1	Lilly King	United States	2:22.41	QA
2	Micah Sumrall	United States	2:22.62	QA
3	Satomi Suzuki	Japan	2:23.57	QA
4	Bethany Galat	United States	2:23.78	QB
5	Kelsey Wog	Canada	2:25.13	QA
6	Sydney Pickrem	Canada	2:25.48	QA
7	Reona Aoki	Japan	2:25.78	QA
8	Kierra Smith	Canada	2:26.01	QB
9	Julia Sebastián	Argentina	2:26.73	QA
10	Jessica Hansen	Australia	2:27.10	~~QA~~, WD
11	Sakiko Shimizu	Japan	2:27.17	QB
12	Melanie Margalis	United States	2:27.99	QB
13	Macarena Ceballos	Argentina	2:28.41	QA
14	Zheng Muyan	China	2:32.13	QB
15	Rachel Nicol	Canada	2:34.01	QB
16	Leiston Pickett	Australia	2:35.07	~~QB~~, WD

=== B Final ===
The B final was held on 12 August from 17:30.

Rank	Name	Nationality	Time	Notes
9	Bethany Galat	United States	2:24.18	
10	Sakiko Shimizu	Japan	2:25.76	
11	Kierra Smith	Canada	2:26.96	
12	Melanie Margalis	United States	2:27.58	
13	Zheng Muyan	China	2:29.29	
14	Rachel Nicol	Canada	2:29.39	

=== A Final ===
The A final was held on 12 August from 17:30.

Rank	Name	Nationality	Time	Notes
1st place, gold medalist(s)	Micah Sumrall	United States	2:21.88	
2nd place, silver medalist(s)	Lilly King	United States	2:22.12	
3rd place, bronze medalist(s)	Satomi Suzuki	Japan	2:22.22	
4	Reona Aoki	Japan	2:24.46	
5	Sydney Pickrem	Canada	2:24.73	
6	Kelsey Wog	Canada	2:24.73	
7	Julia Sebastián	Argentina	2:25.55	
8	Macarena Ceballos	Argentina	2:29.51	
