= 2018 Pan Pacific Swimming Championships – Women's 100 metre breaststroke =

Women's 100 metre breaststroke at the 2018 Pan Pacific Swimming Championships
- Venue: Tokyo Tatsumi International Swimming Center
- Dates: 9 August (heats & finals)
- Competitors: 16 from 7 nations
- Winning time: 1:05.44

Medalists
gold medal	Lilly King	United States
silver medal	Jessica Hansen	Australia
bronze medal	Reona Aoki	Japan

The women's 100 metre breaststroke competition at the 2018 Pan Pacific Swimming Championships took place on August 9 at the Tokyo Tatsumi International Swimming Center. The defending champion was Rebecca Soni of the United States.

== Records ==
Prior to this competition, the existing world and Pan Pacific records were as follows:

World record	Lilly King (USA)	1:04.13	Budapest, Hungary	25 July 2017
Pan Pacific Championships record	Rebecca Soni (USA)	1:04.93	Irvine, United States	19 August 2010

== Results ==
All times are in minutes and seconds.

KEY:	QA	Qualified A Final	QB	Qualified B Final	CR	Championships record	NR	National record	PB	Personal best	SB	Seasonal best

=== Heats ===
The first round was held on 9 August from 10:00.

Only two swimmers from each country may advance to the A or B final. If a country does not qualify any swimmer to the A final, that same country may qualify up to three swimmers to the B final.

Rank	Name	Nationality	Time	Notes
1	Lilly King	United States	1:05.76	QA
2	Reona Aoki	Japan	1:06.36	QA
3	Micah Sumrall	United States	1:06.44	QA
4	Jessica Hansen	Australia	1:06.63	QA
5	Katie Meili	United States	1:06.64	QB
6	Bethany Galat	United States	1:06.67	QB
6	Satomi Suzuki	Japan	1:06.67	QA
8	Kanako Watanabe	Japan	1:07.97	~~QB~~, WD
9	Macarena Ceballos	Argentina	1:08.01	QA
10	Julia Sebastián	Argentina	1:08.06	QA
11	Kelsey Wog	Canada	1:08.13	QA
12	Kierra Smith	Canada	1:08.22	QB
13	Leiston Pickett	Australia	1:08.36	QB
14	Rachel Nicol	Canada	1:08.51	QB
15	Zheng Muyan	China	1:12.07	QB
16	Miranda Renner	Philippines	1:16.20	QB

=== B Final ===
The B final was held on 9 August from 17:30.

Rank	Name	Nationality	Time	Notes
9	Bethany Galat	United States	1:06.41	
10	Katie Meili	United States	1:06.86	
11	Kierra Smith	Canada	1:08.34	
12	Rachel Nicol	Canada	1:08.50	
13	Leiston Pickett	Australia	1:08.65	
14	Zheng Muyan	China	1:11.14	
15	Miranda Renner	Philippines	1:15.19	

=== A Final ===
The A final was held on 9 August from 17:30.

Rank	Name	Nationality	Time	Notes
1st place, gold medalist(s)	Lilly King	United States	1:05.44	
2nd place, silver medalist(s)	Jessica Hansen	Australia	1:06.20	
3rd place, bronze medalist(s)	Reona Aoki	Japan	1:06.34	
4	Satomi Suzuki	Japan	1:06.51	
5	Micah Sumrall	United States	1:06.56	
6	Julia Sebastián	Argentina	1:07.69	
7	Kelsey Wog	Canada	1:07.91	
8	Macarena Ceballos	Argentina	1:08.38	
