= Swimming at the 2019 World Aquatics Championships – Women's 100 metre breaststroke =

Women's 100 metre breaststroke at the 2019 World Aquatics Championships
- Venue: Nambu University Municipal Aquatics Center
- Location: Gwangju, South Korea
- Dates: 22 July (heats and semifinals); 23 July (final)
- Competitors: 56 from 52 nations
- Winning time: 1:04.93

Medalists
gold medal	Lilly King	United States
silver medal	Yuliya Yefimova	Russia
bronze medal	Martina Carraro	Italy

The Women's 100 metre breaststroke competition at the 2019 World Championships was held on 22 and 23 July 2019.

== Records ==
Prior to the competition, the existing world and championship records were as follows.

World record	Lilly King (USA)	1:04.13	Budapest, Hungary	25 July 2017
Competition record	Lilly King (USA)	1:04.13	Budapest, Hungary	25 July 2017

== Results ==
=== Heats ===
The heats were held on 22 July at 10:38.

Rank	Heat	Lane	Name	Nationality	Time	Notes
1	5	4	Lilly King	United States	1:06.31	Q
2	6	4	Yuliya Yefimova	Russia	1:06.58	Q
3	6	2	Martina Carraro	Italy	1:06.62	Q
4	6	3	Tatjana Schoenmaker	South Africa	1:06.76	Q
5	4	4	Reona Aoki	Japan	1:06.81	Q
6	5	2	Yu Jingyao	China	1:06.91	Q
7	5	3	Arianna Castiglioni	Italy	1:07.09	Q
8	5	6	Alia Atkinson	Jamaica	1:07.25	Q
9	6	8	Fanny Lecluyse	Belgium	1:07.27	Q, NR
10	6	7	Lisa Mamie	Switzerland	1:07.30	Q, NR
11	6	6	Jessica Vall	Spain	1:07.32	Q
12	6	5	Jessica Hansen	Australia	1:07.38	Q
13	4	7	Molly Renshaw	Great Britain	1:07.43	Q
14	4	5	Anna Belousova	Russia	1:07.56	Q
15	4	1	Alina Zmushka	Belarus	1:07.69	Q
16	5	5	Micah Sumrall	United States	1:07.81	Q
17	4	6	Tes Schouten	Netherlands	1:08.01	
18	4	3	Kierra Smith	Canada	1:08.05	
19	4	8	Ida Hulkko	Finland	1:08.34	
20	5	7	Sophie Hansson	Sweden	1:08.39	
21	5	9	Back Su-yeon	South Korea	1:08.52	
22	5	8	Kotryna Teterevkova	Lithuania	1:08.64	
22	6	0	Anna Sztankovics	Hungary	1:08.64	
24	6	1	Yeung Jamie Zhen Mei	Hong Kong	1:08.70	
24	6	9	Anna Elendt	Germany	1:08.70	
26	3	5	Maria Romanjuk	Estonia	1:08.95	
27	3	4	Phee Jinq En	Malaysia	1:09.05	
27	3	6	Viktoriya Zeynep Güneş	Turkey	1:09.05	
29	4	0	Matilde Schroder	Denmark	1:09.62	
30	5	0	Weronika Hallmann	Poland	1:09.72	
31	4	2	Shi Jinglin	China	1:09.88	
32	3	0	Ema Rajić	Croatia	1:10.10	
33	3	3	Tatiana Chișca	Moldova	1:10.16	
33	5	1	Niamh Coyne	Ireland	1:10.16	
35	3	1	Margaret Higgs	Bahamas	1:10.65	
36	4	9	Lin Pei-wun	Chinese Taipei	1:10.74	
37	2	4	Nàdia Tudó Cubells	Andorra	1:11.53	NR
38	3	8	María Jiménez Peon	Mexico	1:11.83	
39	3	2	Anandia Evato	Indonesia	1:12.96	
40	3	7	Adelaida Pchelintseva	Kazakhstan	1:13.24	
41	2	2	Lei On Kei	Macau	1:14.11	
42	3	9	Tilka Paljk	Zambia	1:15.02	
43	2	6	Maria Brunlehner	Kenya	1:15.09	
44	1	3	Jayla Pina	Cape Verde	1:16.00	
45	2	8	Tilali Scanlan	American Samoa	1:16.03	
46	2	7	Moana Wind	Fiji	1:16.56	
47	1	2	Darya Semyonova	Turkmenistan	1:16.73	
48	2	5	Amy Micallef	Malta	1:17.06	
49	2	3	Kirsten Fisher-Marsters	Cook Islands	1:17.19	
50	1	6	Chinelo Iyadi	Nigeria	1:20.48	
51	1	7	Evita Leter	Suriname	1:20.89	
52	2	0	Mishael Ayub	Pakistan	1:22.76	
53	2	9	Taeyanna Adams	Federated States of Micronesia	1:26.13	
54	2	1	Nooran Ba Matraf	Yemen	1:26.30	
55	1	4	Sajina Aishath	Maldives	1:27.10	NR
	1	5	Mariana Touré	Guinea	DNS	

=== Semifinals ===
The semifinals were held on 22 July at 20:29.

==== Semifinal 1 ====
Rank	Lane	Name	Nationality	Time	Notes
1	4	Yuliya Yefimova	Russia	1:05.56	Q
2	5	Tatjana Schoenmaker	South Africa	1:06.61	Q
3	3	Yu Jingyao	China	1:06.85	Q
4	7	Jessica Hansen	Australia	1:06.98	
5	2	Lisa Mamie	Switzerland	1:07.11	NR
6	6	Alia Atkinson	Jamaica	1:07.11	
7	1	Anna Belousova	Russia	1:07.17	
8	8	Micah Sumrall	United States	1:07.94	

==== Semifinal 2 ====
Rank	Lane	Name	Nationality	Time	Notes
1	4	Lilly King	United States	1:05.66	Q
2	3	Reona Aoki	Japan	1:06.30	Q
3	5	Martina Carraro	Italy	1:06.39	Q, NR
4	1	Molly Renshaw	Great Britain	1:06.73	Q
5	2	Fanny Lecluyse	Belgium	1:06.97	QSO, NR
6	6	Arianna Castiglioni	Italy	1:06.97	QSO
7	7	Jessica Vall	Spain	1:07.46	
8	8	Alina Zmushka	Belarus	1:07.69	

=== Swim-off ===
The swim-off was held on 22 July at 21:31.

Rank	Lane	Name	Nationality	Time	Notes
1	5	Arianna Castiglioni	Italy	1:06.39	Q, =NR
2	4	Fanny Lecluyse	Belgium	1:07.22	

=== Final ===
The final was held on 23 July at 21:47.

Rank	Lane	Name	Nationality	Time	Notes
1st place, gold medalist(s)	5	Lilly King	United States	1:04.93	
2nd place, silver medalist(s)	4	Yuliya Yefimova	Russia	1:05.49	
3rd place, bronze medalist(s)	6	Martina Carraro	Italy	1:06.36	NR
4	3	Reona Aoki	Japan	1:06.40	
5	1	Yu Jingyao	China	1:06.56	
6	2	Tatjana Schoenmaker	South Africa	1:06.60	
7	7	Molly Renshaw	Great Britain	1:06.96	
8	8	Arianna Castiglioni	Italy	1:07.06	
