= Swimming at the 2015 Pan American Games – Women's 100 metre breaststroke =

Women's 100 metre breaststroke at the 2015 Pan American Games
- Venue: CIBC Pan Am/Parapan Am Aquatics Centre and Field House
- Dates: July 17 (preliminaries and finals)
- Competitors: 18 from 13 nations
- Winning time: 1:06.26

Medalists
| Gold medal | Katie Meili | United States |
| Silver medal | Alia Atkinson | Jamaica |
| Bronze medal | Rachel Nicol | Canada |

The women's 100 metre breaststroke competition of the swimming events at the 2015 Pan American Games took place on July 17 at the CIBC Pan Am/Parapan Am Aquatics Centre and Field House in Toronto, Canada. The defending Pan American Games champion was Ann Catherine Chandler of the United States.

This race consisted of two lengths of the pool, all lengths in breaststroke. The top eight swimmers from the heats would qualify for the A final (where the medals would be awarded), while the next best eight swimmers would qualify for the B final.

== Records ==
Prior to this competition, the existing world and Pan American Games records were as follows:

| World record | Rūta Meilutytė (LTU) | 1:04.35 | Barcelona, Spain | July 29, 2013 |
| Pan American Games record | Annamay Pierse (CAN) | 1:07.78 | Rio de Janeiro, Brazil | July 17, 2007 |

The following new records were set during this competition.

| Date | Event | Name | Nationality | Time | Record |
|---|---|---|---|---|---|
| 17 July | Heat 2 | Katie Meili | United States | 1:05.64 | GR |

== Qualification ==
Each National Olympic Committee (NOC) was able to enter up to two entrants providing they had met the A standard (1:11.89) in the qualifying period (January 1, 2014 to May 1, 2015). NOCs were also permitted to enter one athlete providing they had met the B standard (1:16.20) in the same qualifying period. All other competing athletes were entered as universality spots.

== Schedule ==
All times are Eastern Time Zone (UTC-4).

| Date | Time | Round |
|---|---|---|
| July 17, 2015 | 11:11 | Heats |
| July 17, 2015 | 20:31 | Final B |
| July 17, 2015 | 20:36 | Final A |

== Results ==
| KEY: | q | Fastest non-qualifiers | Q | Qualified | GR | Games record | NR | National record | PB | Personal best | SB | Seasonal best |

=== Heats ===
The first round was held on July 17.

| Rank | Heat | Lane | Name | Nationality | Time | Notes |
|---|---|---|---|---|---|---|
| 1 | 2 | 4 | Katie Meili | United States | 1:05.64 | QA, GR |
| 2 | 3 | 5 | Rachel Nicol | Canada | 1:07.10 | QA |
| 3 | 3 | 4 | Alia Atkinson | Jamaica | 1:07.46 | QA |
| 4 | 1 | 4 | Tera van Beilen | Canada | 1:08.11 | QA |
| 5 | 1 | 5 | Jhennifer Conceição | Brazil | 1:08.75 | QB |
| 6 | 2 | 6 | Annie Lazor | United States | 1:08.94 | QA |
| 7 | 3 | 3 | Beatriz Travalon | Brazil | 1:08.99 | QA |
| 8 | 2 | 3 | Julia Sebastian | Argentina | 1:09.97 | QA |
| 9 | 2 | 5 | Macarena Ceballos | Argentina | 1:10.02 | QB |
| 10 | 1 | 6 | Mercedes Toledo | Venezuela | 1:10.53 | QB |
| 11 | 3 | 6 | Esther González | Mexico | 1:10.83 | QB |
| 12 | 1 | 3 | Arantxa Medina | Mexico | 1:11.70 | QB |
| 13 | 3 | 7 | Laura Morley | Bahamas | 1:14.70 | QB |
| 14 | 2 | 7 | Paula Tamashiro | Peru | 1:15.46 | QB |
| 15 | 2 | 2 | Evita Leter | Suriname | 1:15.84 | QB |
| 16 | 3 | 2 | Lisa Blackburn | Bermuda | 1:16.14 | QB |
| 17 | 1 | 2 | Izzy Shne Joachim | Saint Vincent and the Grenadines | 1:20.25 | |
| 18 | 1 | 7 | Oreoluwa Cherebin | Grenada | 1:21.52 | |

=== B Final ===
The B final was also held on July 17.

| Rank | Lane | Name | Nationality | Time | Notes |
|---|---|---|---|---|---|
| 9 | 4 | Macarena Ceballos | Argentina | 1:09.03 | |
| 10 | 3 | Esther González | Mexico | 1:10.54 | |
| 11 | 5 | Mercedes Toledo | Venezuela | 1:10.90 | |
| 12 | 6 | Arantxa Medina | Mexico | 1:11.32 | |
| 13 | 8 | Lisa Blackburn | Bermuda | 1:14.45 | |
| 14 | 7 | Paula Tamashiro | Peru | 1:14.84 | |
| 15 | 2 | Laura Morley | Bahamas | 1:15.20 | |
| 16 | 1 | Evita Leter | Suriname | 1:15.38 | |

=== A Final ===
The A final was also held on July 17.

| Rank | Lane | Name | Nationality | Time | Notes |
|---|---|---|---|---|---|
| 1st place, gold medalist(s) | 4 | Katie Meili | United States | 1:06.26 | |
| 2nd place, silver medalist(s) | 3 | Alia Atkinson | Jamaica | 1:06.59 | |
| 3rd place, bronze medalist(s) | 5 | Rachel Nicol | Canada | 1:07.91 | |
| 4 | 4 | Tera van Beilen | Canada | 1:08.22 | |
| 5 | 6 | Annie Lazor | United States | 1:08.72 | |
| 6 | 3 | Beatriz Travalon | Brazil | 1:09.23 | |
| 7 | 3 | Julia Sebastian | Argentina | 1:09.83 | |
| | 5 | Jhennifer Conceição | Brazil | DSQ | |
