= 2018 FINA World Swimming Championships (25 m) – Women's 200 metre breaststroke =

Women's 200 metre breaststroke at the 2018 FINA World Swimming Championships (25 m)
- Venue: Hangzhou Sports Park Stadium
- Dates: 16 December
- Competitors: 30
- Winning time: 2:18.32

Medalists
gold medal	Annie Lazor	United States
silver medal	Bethany Galat	United States
bronze medal	Fanny Lecluyse	Belgium

The women's 200 metre breaststroke competition of the 2018 FINA World Swimming Championships (25 m) was held on 16 December 2018.

== Records ==
Prior to the competition, the existing world and championship records were as follows.

	Name	Nation	Time	Location	Date
World record	Rebecca Soni	United States	2:14.57	Manchester	18 December 2009
Championship record	Rikke Møller Pedersen	Denmark	2:16.08	Istanbul	16 December 2012

== Results ==
=== Heats ===
The heats were started on 16 December at 9:52.

Rank	Heat	Lane	Name	Nationality	Time	Notes
1	2	7	Annie Lazor	United States	2:18.99	Q
2	2	5	Fanny Lecluyse	Belgium	2:20.31	Q
3	2	4	Maria Temnikova	Russia	2:20.38	Q
4	2	2	Bethany Galat	United States	2:20.58	Q
5	4	3	Yu Jingyao	China	2:20.66	Q
6	4	4	Ye Shiwen	China	2:20.73	Q
7	3	4	Jessica Vall	Spain	2:21.12	Q
8	2	3	Marina García Urzainqui	Spain	2:21.22	Q
9	4	5	Miho Takahashi	Japan	2:21.37	
10	3	3	Runa Imai	Japan	2:21.85	
11	3	6	Jenna Strauch	Australia	2:22.12	
12	3	5	Vitalina Simonova	Russia	2:22.38	
13	4	2	Jessica Hansen	Australia	2:23.36	
14	2	6	Julia Sebastián	Argentina	2:24.08	
15	3	1	Jenna Laukkanen	Finland	2:24.12	
16	4	1	Andrea Podmaníková	Slovakia	2:24.30	
17	4	8	Fantine Lesaffre	France	2:25.07	
18	4	7	Raquel Gomes Pereira	Portugal	2:25.28	
19	3	0	Maria Romanjuk	Estonia	2:25.83	
20	2	0	Kristýna Horská	Czech Republic	2:26.17	
21	3	9	Niamh Coyne	Ireland	2:26.64	
22	4	0	Viktoriya Zeynep Güneş	Turkey	2:26.82	
23	3	7	Lisa Mamie	Switzerland	2:26.84	
24	3	8	Ciara Smith	New Zealand	2:28.12	
25	1	3	Rebecca Kamau	Kenya	2:29.49	
26	3	2	Emily Visagie	South Africa	2:31.30	
27	2	1	Lin Pei-wun	Chinese Taipei	2:31.32	
28	1	4	Alexandra Schegoleva	Cyprus	2:32.83	
29	4	9	Lam Hoi Kiu	Hong Kong	2:33.08	
30	1	5	Elisa Funes	El Salvador	2:38.43	
	2	8	Cornelia Pammer	Austria	DNS	
	4	6	Jessica Steiger	Germany	DNS	

=== Final ===
The final was held on 16 December at 18:41.

Rank	Lane	Name	Nationality	Time	Notes
1st place, gold medalist(s)	4	Annie Lazor	United States	2:18.32	
2nd place, silver medalist(s)	6	Bethany Galat	United States	2:18.62	
3rd place, bronze medalist(s)	5	Fanny Lecluyse	Belgium	2:18.85	
4	2	Yu Jingyao	China	2:19.20	
5	1	Jessica Vall	Spain	2:19.37	
6	7	Ye Shiwen	China	2:19.52	
7	3	Maria Temnikova	Russia	2:19.58	
8	8	Marina García Urzainqui	Spain	2:20.33	
