= Swimming at the 2019 Pan American Games – Women's 100 metre breaststroke =

Women's 100 metre breaststroke at the 2019 Pan American Games
- Venues: Villa Deportiva Nacional, VIDENA
- Dates: August 6 (preliminaries and finals)
- Competitors: 21 from 16 nations

Medalists
Gold medal	Anne Lazor	United States
Silver medal	Julia Sebastián	Argentina
Bronze medal	Faith Knelson	Canada

The women's 100 metre breaststroke competition of the swimming events at the 2019 Pan American Games was held on 6 August 2019 at the Villa Deportiva Nacional Videna cluster.

== Records ==
Prior to this competition, the existing world and Pan American Games records were as follows:

World record	Lilly King (USA)	1:04.13	Budapest, Hungary	July 25, 2017
Pan American Games record	Katie Meili (USA)	1:05.64	Toronto, Canada	July 17, 2015

== Results ==
KEY:	q	Fastest non-qualifiers	Q	Qualified	GR	Games record	NR	National record	PB	Personal best	SB	Seasonal best

=== Heats ===
The first round was held on August 6.

Rank	Heat	Lane	Name	Nationality	Time	Notes
1	2	4	Anne Lazor	United States	1:06.79	QA
2	3	5	Julia Sebastián	Argentina	1:06.98	QA, SA
3	3	4	Molly Hannis	United States	1:07.59	QA
4	1	5	Byanca Rodríguez Villanueva	Mexico	1:08.30	QA
5	3	3	Jhennifer Conceição	Brazil	1:08.37	QA
6	1	4	Faith Knelson	Canada	1:08.47	QA
7	3	6	Mercedes Toledo Salazar	Venezuela	1:09.74	QA, NR
8	1	3	Esther González	Mexico	1:10.22	QA
9	2	5	Macarena Ceballos	Argentina	1:10.27	QB
10	2	3	Pâmela de Souza	Brazil	1:10.65	QB
11	1	6	Paula Matsumoto	Peru	1:11.21	QB, NR
12	2	6	Laura Morley	Bahamas	1:11.28	QB
13	1	2	Emily Santos	Panama	1:12.39	QB
14	2	2	Daysi Ramírez Garlobo	Cuba	1:13.75	QB
15	2	7	Elisa Funes Jovel	El Salvador	1:14.85	QB, NR
16	3	2	Micaela Sierra Graf	Uruguay	1:15.02	QB
17	1	7	Sofia Lopez Chaparro	Paraguay	1:15.99	
18	2	1	Krista Jurado Schmoock	Guatemala	1:16.20	
19	1	1	Emilie Grand'Pierre	Haiti	1:17.04	
20	3	7	Evita Leter	Suriname	1:18.44	
21	3	1	Adriana Buendia Cornejo	Peru	1:18.82	

=== Final B ===
The B final was also held on August 6.

Rank	Lane	Name	Nationality	Time	Notes
9	4	Macarena Ceballos	Argentina	1:09.48	
10	5	Pâmela de Souza	Brazil	1:10.78	
11	6	Laura Morley	Bahamas	1:11.00	
12	3	Paula Matsumoto	Peru	1:11.08	NR
13	7	Daysi Ramírez Garlobo	Cuba	1:13.63	
14	2	Emily Santos	Panama	1:14.45	
15	1	Elisa Funes Jovel	El Salvador	1:14.67	NR
16	8	Micaela Sierra Graf	Uruguay	1:16.08	

=== Final A ===
The A final was also held on August 6.

Rank	Lane	Name	Nationality	Time	Notes
1st place, gold medalist(s)	4	Anne Lazor	United States	1:06.94	
2nd place, silver medalist(s)	5	Julia Sebastián	Argentina	1:07.09	
3rd place, bronze medalist(s)	7	Faith Knelson	Canada	1:07.42	
4	6	Byanca Rodríguez Villanueva	Mexico	1:07.74	
5	2	Jhennifer Conceição	Brazil	1:08.00	
6	3	Molly Hannis	United States	1:08.32	
7	8	Esther González	Mexico	1:10.04	
8	1	Mercedes Toledo Salazar	Venezuela	1:10.20	
