= Swimming at the 2014 South American Games – Women's 200 metre breaststroke =

Women's 200 metre breaststroke at the 2014 South American Games
- Venue: Estadio Nacional
- Dates: March 9, 2014 (heats & finals)
- Competitors: 9 from 7 nations
- Winning time: 2:31.02

Medalists
gold medal	Pamela Alencar de Souza	Brazil
silver medal	Mercedes Toledo	Venezuela
bronze medal	Juliana Marin	Brazil

The women's 200 metre breaststroke competition at the 2014 South American Games took place on March 9 at the Estadio Nacional. The last champion was Carolina Mussi of Brazil.

This race consisted of four lengths of the pool, all in breaststroke.

== Records ==
Prior to this competition, the existing world and Pan Pacific records were as follows:

World record	Rikke Møller Pedersen (DEN)	2:19.11	Barcelona, Spain	August 1, 2013
South American Games record	Georgina Bardach (ARG)	2:35.28	Buenos Aires, Argentina	November 17, 2006

== Results ==
All times are in minutes and seconds.

KEY:	q	Fastest non-qualifiers	Q	Qualified	CR	Championships record	NR	National record	PB	Personal best	SB	Seasonal best

=== Heats ===
The first round was held on March 9, at 11:24.

Rank	Heat	Lane	Name	Nationality	Time	Notes
1	2	4	Julia Sebastián	Argentina	2:36.87	Q
2	2	5	Pamela Alencar de Souza	Brazil	2:36.99	Q
3	1	4	Salome Cataño	Colombia	2:37.04	Q
4	1	5	Mercedes Toledo	Venezuela	2:37.27	Q
5	1	3	Mijail Asis	Argentina	2:40.26	Q
6	1	6	Avalon Schultz Donlan	Chile	2:40.93	Q
7	2	6	Isabel Riquelme Díaz	Chile	2:42.09	Q
8	2	3	Juliana Marin	Brazil	2:43.29	Q
9	2	2	Sofia López Chaparro	Paraguay	2:49.49	

=== Final ===
The final was held on March 9, at 18:43.

Rank	Lane	Name	Nationality	Time	Notes
1st place, gold medalist(s)	5	Pamela Alencar de Souza	Brazil	2:31.02	CR
2nd place, silver medalist(s)	6	Mercedes Toledo	Venezuela	2:34.62	
3rd place, bronze medalist(s)	8	Juliana Marin	Brazil	2:36.32	
4	3	Salome Cataño	Colombia	2:37.47	
5	2	Mijail Asis	Argentina	2:37.86	
6	1	Isabel Riquelme Díaz	Chile	2:41.01	
7	7	Avalon Schultz Donlan	Chile	2:42.47	
-	4	Julia Sebastián	Argentina	DSQ	
