= Swimming at the 2014 South American Games – Women's 100 metre breaststroke =

Women's 100 metre breaststroke at the 2014 South American Games
- Venue: Estadio Nacional
- Dates: March 10, 2014 (heats & finals)
- Competitors: 9 from 6 nations
- Winning time: 1:10.40

Medalists
gold medal	Julia Sebastián	Argentina
silver medal	Macarena Ceballos	Argentina
bronze medal	Mercedes Toledo	Venezuela

The women's 100 metre breaststroke competition at the 2014 South American Games took place on March 10 at the Estadio Nacional. The last champion was Agustina de Giovanni of Argentina.

This race consisted of two lengths of the pool, both lengths being in breaststroke.

== Results ==
All times are in minutes and seconds.

KEY:	q	Fastest non-qualifiers	Q	Qualified	CR	Championships record	NR	National record	PB	Personal best	SB	Seasonal best

=== Heats ===
The first round was held on March 10, at 12:19.

Rank	Heat	Lane	Name	Nationality	Time	Notes
1	1	3	Macarena Ceballos	Argentina	1:10.83	Q
2	1	5	Mercedes Toledo	Venezuela	1:11.90	Q
3	1	4	Beatriz Travalon	Brazil	1:12.40	Q
4	2	4	Julia Sebastián	Argentina	1:12.94	Q
5	2	6	Isabel Riquelme Díaz	Chile	1:14.14	Q
6	2	5	Juliana Marin	Brazil	1:14.32	Q
7	2	3	Salome Cataño	Colombia	1:14.99	Q
8	2	2	Avalon Schultz Donlan	Chile	1:15.10	Q
9	1	6	Sofia López Chaparro	Paraguay	1:17.55	

=== Final ===
The final was held on March 10, at 20:42.

Rank	Lane	Name	Nationality	Time	Notes
1st place, gold medalist(s)	6	Julia Sebastián	Argentina	1:10.40	
2nd place, silver medalist(s)	4	Macarena Ceballos	Argentina	1:11.00	
3rd place, bronze medalist(s)	5	Mercedes Toledo	Venezuela	1:11.56	
4	7	Juliana Marin	Brazil	1:12.66	
5	3	Beatriz Travalon	Brazil	1:13.02	
6	2	Isabel Riquelme Díaz	Chile	1:14.05	
7	1	Salome Cataño	Colombia	1:15.09	
8	8	Avalon Schultz Donlan	Chile	1:15.28	
