= Swimming at the 2023 Pan American Games – Women's 100 metre breaststroke =

Women's 100 metre breaststroke at the 2023 Pan American Games
- Venue: Aquatic Center
- Date: October 21, 2023
- Competitors: 23 from 17 nations

Medalists
| Gold medal | Rachel Nicol | Canada |
| Silver medal | Sophie Angus | Canada |
| Bronze medal | Macarena Ceballos | Argentina |

The women's 100 metre breaststroke competition of the swimming events at the 2023 Pan American Games were held on October 21, 2023, at the Aquatic Center in Santiago, Chile.

== Records ==
| World record | Lilly King (USA) | 1:04.13 | Budapest, Hungary | July 25, 2017 |
| Pan American Games record | Katie Meili (USA) | 1:05.64 | Toronto, Canada | July 17, 2015 |

== Results ==
| KEY: | QA | Qualified for A final | QB | Qualified for B final | GR | Games record | NR | National record | PB | Personal best | SB | Seasonal best |

=== Heats ===
The first round was held on October 21.

| Rank | Heat | Lane | Name | Nationality | Time | Notes |
|---|---|---|---|---|---|---|
| 1 | 3 | 5 | Rachel Nicol | Canada | 1:08.10 | QA |
| 2 | 3 | 4 | Macarena Ceballos | Argentina | 1:08.12 | QA |
| 3 | 1 | 4 | Sophie Angus | Canada | 1:08.19 | QA |
| 4 | 4 | 3 | Stefanía Gómez | Colombia | 1:08.47 | QA |
| 5 | 2 | 5 | Emma Weber | United States | 1:09.00 | QA |
| 6 | 2 | 3 | Melissa Rodríguez | Mexico | 1:09.32 | QA |
| 7 | 2 | 4 | Jhennifer Conceição | Brazil | 1:09.75 | QA |
| 8 | 3 | 6 | Martina Barbeito | Argentina | 1:10.29 | QA |
| 9 | 2 | 2 | Mercedes Toledo | Venezuela | 1:10.48 | QB |
| 10 | 3 | 2 | Julia Sebastián | Argentina | 1:10.64 | QB |
| 11 | 1 | 5 | Nichelly Lysy | Brazil | 1:10.81 | QB |
| 12 | 1 | 6 | Emily Santos | Panama | 1:10.92 | QB |
| 13 | 2 | 6 | Fernanda Jiménez | Mexico | 1:11.36 | QB |
| 14 | 3 | 3 | Anna Keating | United States | 1:11.42 | QB |
| 15 | 1 | 2 | Nicole Frank | Uruguay | 1:11.44 | QB |
| 16 | 3 | 7 | Daysi Ramírez | Cuba | 1:12.92 | QB |
| 17 | 2 | 7 | Elisa Funes | El Salvador | 1:13.85 | |
| 18 | 3 | 1 | Antonia Cubillos | Chile | 1:15.11 | |
| 19 | 1 | 7 | Sabrina Lyn | Jamaica | 1:15.32 | |
| 20 | 2 | 1 | Astrid Caballero | Paraguay | 1:15.92 | |
| 21 | 1 | 1 | Zaylie Thompson | Bahamas | 1:16.75 | |
| 22 | 2 | 8 | Ana Mack | Independent Athletes Team | 1:17.03 | |
| 23 | 3 | 8 | Paola Cwu | Honduras | 1:20.43 | |

=== Final B ===
The B final was also held on October 21.

| Rank | Lane | Name | Nationality | Time | Notes |
|---|---|---|---|---|---|
| 9 | 6 | Emily Santos | Panama | 1:09.43 | |
| 10 | 3 | Nichelly Lysy | Brazil | 1:10.55 | |
| 11 | 4 | Mercedes Toledo | Venezuela | 1:10.58 | |
| 12 | 5 | Julia Sebastián | Argentina | 1:10.69 | |
| 13 | 2 | Fernanda Jiménez | Mexico | 1:11.05 | |
| 14 | 1 | Nicole Frank | Uruguay | 1:11.60 | |
| 15 | 7 | Anna Keating | United States | 1:11.73 | |
| 16 | 8 | Daysi Ramírez | Cuba | 1:13.48 | |

=== Final A ===
The A final was also held on October 21.

| Rank | Lane | Name | Nationality | Time | Notes |
|---|---|---|---|---|---|
| 1st place, gold medalist(s) | 4 | Rachel Nicol | Canada | 1:07.28 | |
| 2nd place, silver medalist(s) | 3 | Sophie Angus | Canada | 1:07.55 | |
| 3rd place, bronze medalist(s) | 5 | Macarena Ceballos | Argentina | 1:07.68 | |
| 4 | 6 | Stefanía Gómez | Colombia | 1:07.92 | NR |
| 5 | 2 | Emma Weber | United States | 1:08.13 | |
| 6 | 7 | Melissa Rodríguez | Mexico | 1:08.48 | |
| 7 | 1 | Jhennifer Conceição | Brazil | 1:10.10 | |
| 8 | 8 | Martina Barbeito | Argentina | 1:10.91 | |
