= Swimming at the 2015 Pan American Games – Women's 200 metre breaststroke =

Women's 200 metre breaststroke at the 2015 Pan American Games
- Venue: CIBC Pan Am/Parapan Am Aquatics Centre and Field House
- Dates: July 15 (preliminaries and finals)
- Competitors: 16 from 11 nations
- Winning time: 2:24.38

Medalists
Gold medal	Kierra Smith	Canada
Silver medal	Martha McCabe	Canada
Bronze medal	Annie Lazor	United States

The women's 200 metre breaststroke competition of the swimming events at the 2015 Pan American Games took place on July 15 at the CIBC Pan Am/Parapan Am Aquatics Centre and Field House in Toronto, Canada. The defending Pan American Games champion was Ashley McGregor of Canada.

This race consisted of four lengths of the pool, all lengths in breaststroke. The top eight swimmers from the heats would qualify for the A final (where the medals would be awarded), while the next best eight swimmers would qualify for the B final.

== Records ==
Prior to this competition, the existing world and Pan American Games records were as follows:

World record	Rikke Møller Pedersen (DEN)	2:19.11	Barcelona, Spain	August 1, 2013
Pan American Games record	Caitlin Leverenz (USA)	2:25.62	Rio de Janeiro, Brazil	July 22, 2007

The following new records were set during this competition.

Date	Event	Name	Nationality	Time	Record
15 July	Heat 2	Kierra Smith	Canada	2:25.41	GR
15 July	A Final	Kierra Smith	Canada	2:24.38	GR

== Qualification ==
Each National Olympic Committee (NOC) was able to enter up to two entrants providing they had met the A standard (2:36.89) in the qualifying period (January 1, 2014 to May 1, 2015). NOCs were also permitted to enter one athlete providing they had met the B standard (2:46.30) in the same qualifying period. All other competing athletes were entered as universality spots.

== Schedule ==
All times are Eastern Time Zone (UTC-4).

Date	Time	Round
July 15, 2015	10:33	Heats
July 15, 2015	19:43	Final B
July 15, 2015	19:50	Final A

== Results ==
KEY:	q	Fastest non-qualifiers	Q	Qualified	GR	Games record	NR	National record	PB	Personal best	SB	Seasonal best

=== Heats ===
The first round was held on July 15.

Rank	Heat	Lane	Name	Nationality	Time	Notes
1	2	4	Kierra Smith	Canada	2:25.41	QA, GR
2	2	3	Annie Lazor	United States	2:26.37	QA
3	1	4	Martha McCabe	Canada	2:27.47	QA
4	1	2	Esther González	Mexico	2:28.15	QA
5	1	3	Byanca Rodriguez	Mexico	2:28.73	QA
6	2	5	Alia Atkinson	Jamaica	2:28.86	QA
7	1	5	Julia Sebastian	Argentina	2:29.00	QA
8	1	6	Pamela Souza	Brazil	2:31.14	QA
9	2	6	Macarena Ceballos	Argentina	2:31.35	QB
10	2	2	Meghan Small	United States	2:32.40	QB
11	1	7	Beatriz Travalon	Brazil	2:32.73	QB
12	2	7	Mercedes Toledo	Venezuela	2:34.43	QB
13	2	1	Laura Morley	Bahamas	2:40.28	QB
14	1	8	Lisa Blackburn	Bermuda	2:42.82	QB
15	1	1	Paula Tamashiro	Peru	2:43.73	QB
16	2	8	Izzy Shne Joachim	Saint Vincent and the Grenadines	2:58.72	QB

=== B Final ===
The B final was also held on July 15.

Rank	Lane	Name	Nationality	Time	Notes
9	4	Macarena Ceballos	Argentina	2:30.76	
10	5	Meghan Small	United States	2:31.35	
11	3	Beatriz Travalon	Brazil	2:33.21	
12	6	Mercedes Toledo	Venezuela	2:33.57	
13	1	Paula Tamashiro	Peru	2:41.94	
14	2	Laura Morley	Bahamas	2:42.99	
15	7	Lisa Blackburn	Bermuda	2:46.32	

=== A Final ===
The A final was also held on July 15.

Rank	Lane	Name	Nationality	Time	Notes
1st place, gold medalist(s)	4	Kierra Smith	Canada	2:24.38	GR
2nd place, silver medalist(s)	3	Martha McCabe	Canada	2:24.51	
3rd place, bronze medalist(s)	5	Annie Lazor	United States	2:26.23	
4	7	Alia Atkinson	Jamaica	2:27.15	
5	2	Byanca Rodriguez	Mexico	2:28.87	
6	1	Julia Sebastian	Argentina	2:29.45	
7	6	Esther González	Mexico	2:29.83	
8	8	Pamela Souza	Brazil	2:32.41	
