= Swimming at the 2019 World Aquatics Championships – Women's 4 × 100 metre medley relay =

Women's 4 × 100 metre medley relay at the 2019 World Aquatics Championships
- Venue: Nambu University Municipal Aquatics Center
- Location: Gwangju, South Korea
- Dates: 28 July (heats and final)
- Competitors: 100 from 21 nations
- Teams: 21
- Winning time: 3:50.40 WR

Medalists
gold medal	Regan Smith; Lilly King; Kelsi Dahlia; Simone Manuel; Olivia Smoliga; Melanie Margalis; Katie McLaughlin; Mallory Comerford	United States
silver medal	Minna Atherton; Jessica Hansen; Emma McKeon; Cate Campbell; Kaylee McKeown; Brianna Throssell; Madison Wilson	Australia
bronze medal	Kylie Masse; Sydney Pickrem; Maggie MacNeil; Penny Oleksiak; Kierra Smith; Rebecca Smith; Taylor Ruck	Canada

The Women's 4 × 100 metre medley relay competition at the 2019 World Championships was held on 28 July 2019.

== Records ==
Prior to the competition, the existing world and championship records were as follows.

World record	United States	3:51.55	Budapest, Hungary	30 July 2017
Competition record	United States	3:51.55	Budapest, Hungary	30 July 2017

== Results ==
=== Heats ===
The heats were held on 28 July at 11:07.

Rank	Heat	Lane	Nation	Swimmers	Time	Notes
1	2	4	United States	Olivia Smoliga (58.79); Melanie Margalis (1:06.40); Katie McLaughlin (57.15); Mallory Comerford (53.05)	3:55.39	Q
2	3	4	Australia	Kaylee McKeown (59.44); Jessica Hansen (1:06.99); Brianna Throssell (58.28); Madison Wilson (53.48)	3:58.19	Q
3	2	6	Italy	Margherita Panziera (1:00.56); Arianna Castiglioni (1:06.68); Ilaria Bianchi (57.54); Federica Pellegrini (53.57)	3:58.35	Q
4	3	3	Canada	Kylie Masse (58.98); Kierra Smith (1:08.61); Rebecca Smith (58.04); Taylor Ruck (53.00)	3:58.63	Q
5	3	7	China	Fu Yuanhui (1:00.01); Yu Jingyao (1:07.28); Wang Yichun (58.13); Zhu Menghui (53.84)	3:59.26	Q
6	2	1	Sweden	Michelle Coleman (1:01.41); Sophie Hansson (1:07.33); Louise Hansson (57.43); Sarah Sjöström (53.23)	3:59.40	Q
7	3	6	Great Britain	Georgia Davies (1:00.32); Molly Renshaw (1:08.00); Alys Thomas (58.77); Anna Hopkin (52.65)	3:59.74	Q
8	2	5	Japan	Natsumi Sakai (1:00.16); Reona Aoki (1:07.65); Hiroko Makino (58.17); Rika Omoto (53.89)	3:59.87	Q
9	2	2	Germany	Laura Riedemann (1:00.20); Anna Elendt (1:08.74); Angelina Köhler (57.95); Jessica Steiger (54.02)	4:00.91	
10	3	2	Netherlands	Kira Toussaint (1:00.04); Tes Schouten (1:08.45); Kim Busch (59.90); Femke Heemskerk (53.03)	4:01.42	
11	3	8	Switzerland	Nina Kost (1:02.49); Lisa Mamie (1:06.80); Alexandra Touretski (58.68); Maria Ugolkova (53.88)	4:01.85	NR
12	3	5	Russia	Daria Vaskina (1:01.08); Anna Belousova (1:08.47); Svetlana Chimrova (58.33); Daria S Ustinova (54.38)	4:02.26	
13	1	5	South Korea	Im Da-sol (1:00.44); Back Su-yeon (1:08.70); Park Ye-rin (58.84); Jeong So-eun (55.40)	4:03.38	NR
14	2	7	Hong Kong	Stephanie Au (1:01.12); Yeung Jamie Zhen Mei (1:08.92); Chan Kin Lok (1:00.45); Siobhán Haughey (53.03)	4:03.52	
15	2	8	Poland	Alicja Tchórz (1:00.97); Weronika Hallmann (1:08.88); Paulina Nogaj (59.51); Katarzyna Wasick (54.91)	4:04.27	
16	2	3	Denmark	Mie Nielsen (1:01.79); Matilde Schroder (1:08.74); Jeanette Ottesen (58.55); Julie Kepp Jensen (55.25)	4:04.33	
17	2	0	South Africa	Mariella Venter (1:02.84); Tatjana Schoenmaker (1:07.16); Tayla Lovemore (59.34); Emma Chelius (55.78)	4:05.12	
18	1	3	Finland	Mimosa Jallow (1:01.20); Ida Hulkko (1:07.35); Jenna Laukkanen (1:00.53); Laura Lahtinen (56.42)	4:05.50	
19	3	1	Hungary	Katalin Burián (1:00.83); Anna Sztankovics (1:08.96); Liliána Szilágyi (59.25); Evelyn Verrasztó (56.57)	4:05.61	
20	1	4	Turkey	Ekaterina Avramova (1:01.95); Viktoriya Zeynep Güneş (1:09.01); Aleyna Özkan (59.42); Selen Özbilen (55.34)	4:05.72	NR
21	3	0	Singapore	Quah Jing Wen (1:05.07); Christie Chue (1:11.02); Quah Ting Wen (59.95); Cherlyn Yeoh (55.63)	4:11.67	

=== Final ===
The final was held on 28 July at 21:56.

Rank	Lane	Nation	Swimmers	Time	Notes
1st place, gold medalist(s)	4	United States	Regan Smith (57.57 WR); Lilly King (1:04.81); Kelsi Dahlia (56.16); Simone Manuel (51.86)	3:50.40	WR
2nd place, silver medalist(s)	5	Australia	Minna Atherton (59.06); Jessica Hansen (1:06.08); Emma McKeon (56.32); Cate Campbell (51.96)	3:53.42	
3rd place, bronze medalist(s)	6	Canada	Kylie Masse (59.12); Sydney Pickrem (1:06.42); Maggie MacNeil (55.56); Penny Oleksiak (52.48)	3:53.58	NR
4	3	Italy	Margherita Panziera (59.77); Martina Carraro (1:06.87); Elena Di Liddo (57.33); Federica Pellegrini (52.53)	3:56.50	NR
5	2	China	Chen Jie (1:00.89); Yu Jingyao (1:06.42); Zhang Yufei (56.44); Yang Junxuan (53.36)	3:57.11	
6	8	Japan	Natsumi Sakai (59.48); Reona Aoki (1:06.58); Hiroko Makino (58.22); Rika Omoto (53.86)	3:58.14	
7	7	Sweden	Michelle Coleman (1:01.42); Sophie Hansson (1:07.20); Louise Hansson (57.23); Sarah Sjöström (52.54)	3:58.39	
8	1	Great Britain	Georgia Davies (59.55); Molly Renshaw (1:07.72); Alys Thomas (58.56); Freya Anderson (53.55)	3:59.38	
