= Swimming at the 2018 Commonwealth Games – Women's 50 metre backstroke =

Women's 50 metre backstroke at the 2018 Commonwealth Games
- Venue: Gold Coast Aquatic Centre
- Dates: 9 April (heats, semifinals); 10 April (final)
- Competitors: 30 from 21 nations
- Winning time: 27.78

Medalists
gold medal	Emily Seebohm	Australia
silver medal	Kylie Masse	Canada
bronze medal	Georgia Davies	Wales

The women's 50 metre backstroke event at the 2018 Commonwealth Games was held on 9 and 10 April at the Gold Coast Aquatic Centre.

== Records ==
Prior to this competition, the existing world, Commonwealth and Games records were as follows:

World record	Zhao Jing (CHN)	27.06	Rome, Italy	30 July 2009
Commonwealth record	Emily Seebohm (AUS)	27.37	Budapest, Hungary	27 July 2017
Games record	Georgia Davies (WAL)	27.56	Glasgow, United Kingdom	29 July 2014

== Results ==
=== Heats ===
The heats were held on 9 April at 10:49.

Rank	Heat	Lane	Name	Nationality	Time	Notes
1	4	4	Emily Seebohm	Australia	27.63	Q
2	3	4	Georgia Davies	Wales	27.91	Q
3	4	5	Kylie Masse	Canada	27.99	Q
4	4	3	Kathleen Dawson	Scotland	28.17	Q
5	4	6	Cassie Wild	Scotland	28.31	Q
6	2	4	Holly Barratt	Australia	28.49	Q
7	2	5	Minna Atherton	Australia	28.50	Q
8	3	6	Alexia Zevnik	Canada	28.75	Q
9	3	3	Lucy Hope	Scotland	28.77	Q
10	3	2	Bobbi Gichard	New Zealand	28.81	Q
11	3	5	Jade Hannah	Canada	28.82	Q
12	2	7	Naomi Ruele	Botswana	29.18	Q
13	2	6	Danielle Hill	Northern Ireland	29.27	Q
14	2	3	Anna Maine	England	29.29	Q
15	3	7	Erin Gallagher	South Africa	29.38	Q, WD
16	2	2	Harriet West	Wales	29.46	Q
17	4	7	Mariella Venter	South Africa	29.88	Q
18	4	2	Caroline Zi Xin Chan	Malaysia	30.10	
19	3	1	Lushavel Stickland	Samoa	30.14	
20	3	8	Tatiana Tostevin	Guernsey	30.19	
21	2	1	Kalia Antoniou	Cyprus	30.62	
22	4	8	Sylvia Brunlehner	Kenya	30.72	
23	1	5	Gemma Atherley	Jersey	30.91	
24	2	8	Vinoli Kaluarachchi	Sri Lanka	31.02	
25	1	3	Aaliyah Palestrini	Seychelles	31.19	
26	4	1	Lauren Hew	Cayman Islands	31.35	
27	1	4	Bisma Khan	Pakistan	31.43	
28	1	6	Therese Soukup	Seychelles	32.88	
29	1	7	Charissa Panuve	Tonga	36.37	
30	1	2	Rebecca Asare	Ghana	36.64	

=== Semifinals ===
The semifinals were held on 9 April at 20:57.

==== Semifinal 1 ====
Rank	Lane	Name	Nationality	Time	Notes
1	4	Georgia Davies	Wales	27.86	Q
2	3	Holly Barratt	Australia	28.12	Q
3	5	Kathleen Dawson	Scotland	28.26	Q
4	6	Alexia Zevnik	Canada	28.56	
4	2	Bobbi Gichard	New Zealand	28.56	
6	7	Naomi Ruele	Botswana	29.17	
7	1	Anna Maine	England	29.33	
8	8	Mariella Venter	South Africa	29.58	

==== Semifinal 2 ====
Rank	Lane	Name	Nationality	Time	Notes
1	4	Emily Seebohm	Australia	27.89	Q
2	5	Kylie Masse	Canada	28.00	Q
3	3	Cassie Wild	Scotland	28.29	Q
4	2	Lucy Hope	Scotland	28.31	Q
5	7	Jade Hannah	Canada	28.37	Q
6	6	Minna Atherton	Australia	28.47	
7	1	Danielle Hill	Northern Ireland	28.86	
8	8	Harriet West	Wales	29.35	

=== Final ===
The final was held on 10 April at 19:50.

Rank	Lane	Name	Nationality	Time	Notes
1st place, gold medalist(s)	5	Emily Seebohm	Australia	27.78	
2nd place, silver medalist(s)	3	Kylie Masse	Canada	27.82	
3rd place, bronze medalist(s)	4	Georgia Davies	Wales	27.90	
4	6	Holly Barratt	Australia	27.96	
5	7	Cassie Wild	Scotland	28.18	
6	2	Kathleen Dawson	Scotland	28.37	
7	8	Jade Hannah	Canada	28.38	
8	1	Lucy Hope	Scotland	28.54	
