= Swimming at the 2014 South American Games – Women's 4 × 100 metre medley relay =

Women's 4 x 100 metre medley relay at the 2014 South American Games
- Venue: Estadio Nacional
- Dates: March 10, 2014 (heats & finals)
- Winning time: 4:11.49

Medalists
gold medal	Etiene Medeiros, Beatriz Travalon, Daynara de Paula and Larissa Oliveira	Brazil
silver medal	Andrea Berrino, Julia Sebastián, Maria Belen Diaz and Aixa Triay	Argentina
bronze medal	Carolina Colorado Henao, Salome Cataño, Jessica Camposano and María Muñoz	Colombia

The women's 4 x 100 metre medley relay competition at the 2014 South American Games took place on March 10 at the Estadio Nacional. The last champion was Brazil.

== Records ==
Prior to this competition, the existing world and Pan Pacific records were as follows:

World record	United States (USA); Missy Franklin (58.50); Rebecca Soni (1:04.82); Dana Vollmer (55.48); Allison Schmitt (53.25)	3:52.05	London, Great Britain	August 4, 2012
South American Games record	Brazil (BRA); Fabíola Molina (1:03.52); Tatiane Sakemi (1:13.33); Daynara de Paula (1:00.54); Tatiana Barbosa (56.58)	4:13.97	Medellín, Colombia	March 29, 2010

== Results ==
All times are in minutes and seconds.

KEY:	q	Fastest non-qualifiers	Q	Qualified	CR	Championships record	NR	National record	PB	Personal best	SB	Seasonal best

=== Heats ===
Heats weren't performed, as only seven teams had entered.

=== Final ===
The final was held on March 10, at 21:13.

Rank	Lane	Name	Nationality	Time	Notes
1st place, gold medalist(s)	5	Etiene Medeiros (1:04.14); Beatriz Travalon (1:12.77); Daynara de Paula (59.92); Larissa Oliveira (54.66)	Brazil	4:11.49	CR
2nd place, silver medalist(s)	4	Andrea Berrino (1:04.19); Julia Sebastián (1:09.60); Maria Belen Diaz (1:01.78); Aixa Triay (56.60)	Argentina	4:12.17	NR
3rd place, bronze medalist(s)	1	Carolina Colorado Henao (1:02.37); Salome Cataño (1:13.56); Jessica Camposano (1:01.47); María Muñoz (57.99)	Colombia	4:15.39	
4	3	Jeserik Pinto Sequera (1:05.40); Mercedes Toledo Salazar (1:10.80); Erika Torrellas (1:02.60); Wendy Rodriguez Crespo (57.85)	Venezuela	4:16.65	
5	6	Estefanía Urzúa Morales (1:08.37); Isabel Riquelme Díaz (1:16.78); Martina Navarro Kusch (1:05.68); Courtney Schultz Donlan (58.65)	Chile	4:29.48	NR
6	7	Nicole Marmol Gilbert (1:08.58); Samantha Arevalo (1:18.78); Sharon Bravo Rivas (1:03.27); Loren Bahamonde Cabello (1:00.20)	Ecuador	4:30.83	
7	2	Maria Arrua Villagra (1:10.08); Sofia López Chaparro (1:17.19); Paloma Riveras Ortiz (1:07.19); Karen Riveros (1:00.11)	Paraguay	4:34.57	
