= 2018 Pan Pacific Swimming Championships – Women's 4 × 100 metre medley relay =

Women's 4 × 100 metre medley relay at the 2018 Pan Pacific Swimming Championships
- Venue: Tokyo Tatsumi International Swimming Center
- Dates: 12 August
- Competitors: 20 from 5 nations
- Winning time: 3:52.74

Medalists
gold medal	Emily Seebohm; Jessica Hansen; Emma McKeon; Cate Campbell	Australia
silver medal	Kathleen Baker; Lilly King; Kelsi Dahlia; Simone Manuel	United States
bronze medal	Natsumi Sakai; Reona Aoki; Rikako Ikee; Tomomi Aoki	Japan

The women's 4 × 100 metre medley relay competition at the 2018 Pan Pacific Swimming Championships took place on August 12 at the Tokyo Tatsumi International Swimming Center. The defending champion was Australia.

== Records ==
Prior to this competition, the existing world and Pan Pacific records were as follows:

World record	United States (USA); Kathleen Baker (58.54); Lilly King (1:04.48); Kelsi Worrell (56.30); Simone Manuel (52.23)	3:51.55	Budapest, Hungary	30 July 2017
Pan Pacific Championships record	United States (USA); Natalie Coughlin (59.85); Rebecca Soni (1:05.35); Dana Vollmer (56.91); Jessica Hardy (53.12)	3:55.23	Irvine, United States	21 August 2010

== Results ==
All times are in minutes and seconds.

KEY:	CR	Championships record	NR	National record	PB	Personal best	SB	Seasonal best

=== Final ===
The final was held on 12 August from 18:00.

Rank	Lane	Nation	Swimmers	Time	Notes
1st place, gold medalist(s)	5	Australia	Emily Seebohm (59.28); Jessica Hansen (1:05.82); Emma McKeon (56.45); Cate Campbell (51.19)	3:52.74	CR
2nd place, silver medalist(s)	4	United States	Kathleen Baker (59.41); Lilly King (1:04.86); Kelsi Dahlia (56.72); Simone Manuel (52.22)	3:53.21	
3rd place, bronze medalist(s)	3	Japan	Natsumi Sakai (59.20); Reona Aoki (1:06.84); Rikako Ikee (55.48); Tomomi Aoki (53.51)	3:55.03	NR
4	6	Canada	Kylie Masse (58.63); Kelsey Wog (1:07.28); Rebecca Smith (57.51); Taylor Ruck (51.72)	3:55.14	
5	2	Philippines	Chloe Isleta (1:04.22); Miranda Renner (1:14.90); Rosalee Santa Ana (1:06.42); Nicole Oliva (56.64)	4:22.18	
