= Swimming at the 2018 Commonwealth Games – Women's 100 metre backstroke =

Women's 100 metre backstroke at the 2018 Commonwealth Games
- Venue: Gold Coast Aquatic Centre
- Dates: 6 April (heats, semifinals); 7 April (final)
- Competitors: 26 from 17 nations
- Winning time: 58.63

Medalists
gold medal	Kylie Masse	Canada
silver medal	Emily Seebohm	Australia
bronze medal	Taylor Ruck	Canada

The women's 100 metre backstroke event at the 2018 Commonwealth Games was held on 6 and 7 April at the Gold Coast Aquatic Centre.

== Schedule ==
The schedule is as follows:

All times are Australian Eastern Standard Time (UTC+10)

Date	Time	Round
Friday 6 April 2018	11:12	Qualifying
Friday 6 April 2018	20:55	Semifinals
Saturday 7 April 2018	20:03	Final

== Records ==
Prior to this competition, the existing world, Commonwealth and Games records were as follows:

World record	Kylie Masse (CAN)	58.10	Budapest, Hungary	25 July 2017
Commonwealth record	Kylie Masse (CAN)	58.10	Budapest, Hungary	25 July 2017
Games record	Belinda Hocking (AUS)	59.37	Glasgow, Great Britain	26 July 2014

The following records were established during the competition:

Date	Event	Name	Nationality	Time	Record
6 April	Heat 3	Emily Seebohm	Australia	58.91	GR
6 April	Heat 4	Kylie Masse	Canada	58.70	GR
6 April	Semifinals	Kylie Masse	Canada	58.66	GR
7 April	Final	Kylie Masse	Canada	58.63	GR

== Results ==
=== Heats ===
Rank	Heat	Lane	Name	Nation	Result	Notes
1	4	4	Kylie Masse	Canada	58.70	Q, GR
2	3	4	Emily Seebohm	Australia	58.91	Q, GR
3	4	3	Elizabeth Simmonds	England	1:00.49	Q
4	4	5	Georgia Davies	Wales	1:00.57	Q
5	2	5	Kaylee McKeown	Australia	1:00.65	Q
6	2	4	Taylor Ruck	Canada	1:00.72	Q
7	2	3	Hayley Baker	Australia	1:00.82	Q
8	4	6	Jessica Fullalove	England	1:01.04	Q
9	4	2	Bobbi Gichard	New Zealand	1:01.33	Q
10	3	3	Kathleen Dawson	Scotland	1:01.38	Q
11	3	5	Jade Hannah	Canada	1:01.51	Q
12	3	6	Cassie Wild	Scotland	1:02.29	Q
13	3	7	Naomi Ruele	Botswana	1:02.58	Q
14	2	6	Anna Maine	England	1:02.63	Q
15	4	7	Nathania van Niekerk	South Africa	1:02.81	Q
16	2	7	Danielle Hill	Northern Ireland	1:03.08	Q
17	3	2	Mariella Venter	South Africa	1:03.39	
18	3	1	Gemma Atherley	Jersey	1:04.75	
19	4	8	Tatiana Tostevin	Guernsey	1:04.90	
20	2	8	Caroline Zi Xin Chan	Malaysia	1:05.94	
21	4	1	Lushavel Stickland	Samoa	1:06.02	
22	3	8	Lauren Hew	Cayman Islands	1:06.41	
23	2	1	Sylvia Tanya Atieno Brunlehner	Kenya	1:06.64	
24	1	4	Aaliyah Palestrini	Seychelles	1:07.26	
25	1	5	Vinoli Kaluarachchi	Sri Lanka	1:07.64	
26	1	3	Therese Soukup	Seychelles	1:10.57	
27	2	2	Harriet West	Wales	DNS	

=== Semifinals ===
Rank	Heat	Lane	Name	Nation	Result	Notes
1	2	4	Kylie Masse	Canada	58.66	Q, GR
2	1	4	Emily Seebohm	Australia	58.95	Q
3	1	3	Taylor Ruck	Canada	1:00.06	Q
4	2	3	Kaylee McKeown	Australia	1:00.11	Q
5	1	5	Georgia Davies	Wales	1:00.33	Q
6	2	7	Jade Hannah	Canada	1:00.37	Q
7	2	6	Hayley Baker	Australia	1:00.63	Q
8	1	2	Kathleen Dawson	Scotland	1:00.67	QSO
9	2	5	Elizabeth Simmonds	England	1:00.67	QSO
10	1	7	Cassie Wild	Scotland	1:00.93	
11	1	6	Jessica Fullalove	England	1:01.39	
12	2	2	Bobbi Gichard	New Zealand	1:01.75	
13	1	1	Anna Maine	England	1:02.29	
14	1	8	Danielle Hill	Northern Ireland	1:02.62	
15	2	1	Naomi Ruele	Botswana	1:03.01	
16	2	8	Nathania van Niekerk	South Africa	1:03.06	

=== Swim-off ===
Rank	Lane	Name	Nationality	Time	Notes
1	4	Kathleen Dawson	Scotland	1:01.06	Q
2	5	Elizabeth Simmonds	England	1:01.13	

=== Final ===
Rank	Lane	Name	Nation	Result	Notes
1st place, gold medalist(s)	4	Kylie Masse	Canada	58.63	GR
2nd place, silver medalist(s)	5	Emily Seebohm	Australia	58.66	
3rd place, bronze medalist(s)	3	Taylor Ruck	Canada	58.97	
4	6	Kaylee McKeown	Australia	1:00.08	
5	2	Georgia Davies	Wales	1:00.17	
6	8	Kathleen Dawson	Scotland	1:00.74	
6	1	Hayley Baker	Australia	1:00.74	
8	7	Jade Hannah	Canada	1:00.83	
