= 2017 FINA World Junior Swimming Championships =

Sixth iteration of the World Junior Swimming Championships

- Host city: Indianapolis
- Date: August 23–28, 2017
- Venue: Indiana University Natatorium
- Nations: 90
- Athletes: 619

The 6th FINA World Junior Swimming Championships, was held in Indianapolis, United States. The championships were for girls aged 14–17 and boys age 15–18. Over 600 athletes from 90 different countries competed at the Championships.

== Host selection ==
Hosting rights were originally awarded to Budapest, Hungary, but they decided to withdraw since they were already hosting the 2017 World Aquatics Championships. Budapest is scheduled to host the 2019 FINA World Junior Swimming Championships. Host city Indianapolis has previously hosted U.S. Olympic Trials 4 times since 1982.

== Venue ==
The event was held at the Indiana University Natatorium, which is best known for hosting the 1987 Pan American Games. The pool is on the campus of Purdue University.

== Medal summary ==
=== Medal table ===
* Host nation (United States)

Rank	Nation	Gold	Silver	Bronze	Total
1	United States*	11	12	7	30
2	Canada	7	5	3	15
3	Japan	6	4	6	16
4	Hungary	5	8	3	16
5	Russia	3	3	8	14
6	Spain	3	1	2	6
7	Italy	2	2	1	5
8	Argentina	2	1	0	3
9	Great Britain	2	0	2	4
10	Ireland	1	1	1	3
11	Germany	1	0	0	1
12	Australia	0	1	4	5
13	France	0	1	1	2
13	Poland	0	1	1	2
15	Sweden	0	1	0	1
16	Bulgaria	0	0	1	1
16	Romania	0	0	1	1
16	Serbia	0	0	1	1
Totals (18 entries)		43	41	42	126

=== Men ===
Event	Gold		Silver		Bronze	
50 m freestyle	Michael Andrew; United States	21.75 =WJ	Maxime Grousset; France	22.25	Leonardo Deplano; Italy	22.31
100 m freestyle^{[c]}	Ivan Girev; Russia	48.33; CR	Nándor Németh; Hungary	48.95	Daniel Krueger; United States	49.35
200 m freestyle	Ivan Girev; Russia	1:46.40; WJ	Nándor Németh; Hungary	1:46.79	Elijah Winnington; Australia	1:46.81
400 m freestyle	Andrew Abruzzo; United States	3:49.19	Balázs Holló; Hungary	3:49.97	Trey Freeman III; United States	3:50.14
800 m freestyle	Andrew Abruzzo; United States	7:54.58	Dávid Lakatos; Hungary	7:56.81	Michael Brinegar; United States	7:57.22
1500 m freestyle	Andrew Abruzzo; United States	15:06.48	Michael Brinegar; United States	15:09.00	Iaroslav Potapov; Russia	15:09.18
50 m backstroke	Michael Andrew; United States	24.63; WJ	Hugo Gonzalez; Spain	25.30	Kacper Stokowski; Poland	25.38
100 m backstroke	Hugo Gonzalez; Spain	54.27; CR	Conor Ferguson; Ireland	54.51	Daniel Martin; Romania	54.55
200 m backstroke	Hugo Gonzalez; Spain	1:56.69; CR	Carson Foster; United States	1:57.87	Nikita Tretyakov; Russia	1:58.72
50 m breaststroke	Nicolò Martinenghi; Italy	27.10	Alessandro Pinzuti; Italy	27.19	Michael Andrew; United States	27.39
100 m breaststroke	Nicolò Martinenghi; Italy	59.58	Reece Whitley; United States	1:00.08	Michael Andrew; United States	1:00.37
200 m breaststroke	Daniel Roy; United States	2:10.77	Reece Whitley; United States	2:10.82	Zac Stubblety-Cook; Australia	2:10.90
50 m butterfly	Michael Andrew; United States	23.22; WJ	Andrey Minakov; Russia	23.53	Kristóf Milák; Hungary	23.72
100 m butterfly	Kristóf Milák; Hungary	51.08; CR	Egor Kuimov; Russia	51.16; NR	Andrey Minakov; Russia	51.84
200 m butterfly	Kristóf Milák; Hungary	1:53.87; CR	Yuya Sakamoto; Japan	1:57.05	Antani Ivanov; Bulgaria	1:57.54
200 m individual medley	Johannes Hintze; Germany	1:59.03; WJ	Kieran Smith; United States	1:59.56	Márton Barta; Hungary	2:00.14
400 m individual medley	Hugo Gonzalez; Spain	4:14.65; CR	Márton Barta; Hungary	4:15.65	Balázs Holló; Hungary	4:16.78
4×100 m freestyle relay^{[c]}	Hungary (HUN); Kristóf Milák (49.08); Márton Barta (50.58); Richárd Márton (50.09); Nándor Németh (48.24); Dávid Lakatos	3:17.99	Poland (POL); Karol Ostrowski (49.87); Bartosz Piszczorowicz (49.12); Kacper Stokowski (49.88); Jakub Kraska (49.66); Antoni Kałużyński	3:18.53	Australia (AUS); Jordan Brunt (49.68); Zachary Attard (49.57); Samuel Wendt (50.67); Elijah Winnington (48.63)	3:18.55
4×200 m freestyle relay	Hungary (HUN); Richárd Márton (1:48.68); Kristóf Milák (1:47.52); Balázs Holló (1:48.23); Nándor Németh (1:46.52); Ákos Kalmár; Márton Barta; Dávid Lakatos	7:10.95; WJ	United States (USA); Patrick Callan (1:47.33); Jack LeVant (1:47.98); Carson Foster (1:48.12); Trey Freeman III (1:47.53); Cody Bybee; Drew Kibler	7:10.96	Russia (RUS); Ivan Girev (1:46.62); Petr Zhikharev (1:49.43); Maksim Aleksandrov (1:48.66); Martin Malyutin (1:46.68); Mihail Bocharnikov	7:11.39
4×100 m medley relay^{[c]}	Russia (RUS); Nikita Tretyakov (56.11); Evgenii Somov (1:00.75); Egor Kuimov (51.17); Ivan Girev (48.27); Vladislav Gerasimenko; Andrey Minakov; Gleb Karasev	3:36.30; WJ	Italy (ITA); Thomas Ceccon (55.06); Nicolò Martinenghi (59.10); Federico Burdisso (52.86); Davide Nardini (49.42); Alessandro Pinzuti; Alberto Razzetti	3:36.44	Australia (AUS); Leon MacAlister (56.22); Zac Stubblety-Cook (1:00.43); Jordan Brunt (52.67); Elijah Winnington (49.07); Taj Jones; Zachary Attard	3:38.39

=== Women ===
Event	Gold		Silver		Bronze	
50 m freestyle	Rikako Ikee; Japan	24.59; CR	Grace Ariola; United States	24.82	Sayuki Ouchi; Japan	25.07
100 m freestyle	Freya Anderson; Great Britain	53.88; CR	Rikako Ikee; Japan	54.16	Kayla Sanchez; Canada	54.44
200 m freestyle	Taylor Ruck; Canada	1:57.08; CR	Ajna Késely; Hungary	1:57.10	Irina Krivonogova; Russia	1:58.51
400 m freestyle	Ajna Késely; Hungary	4:06.72	Delfina Pignatiello; Argentina	4:08.33; NR	Anastasiia Kirpichnikova; Russia	4:08.73
800 m freestyle	Delfina Pignatiello; Argentina	8:25.22; CR, SA	Ajna Késely; Hungary	8:30.62	Agueda Cons Gestido; Spain	8:30.85
1500 m freestyle	Delfina Pignatiello; Argentina	15:59.51; CR, NR	Ajna Késely; Hungary	16:15.68	Agueda Cons Gestido; Spain	16:17.84
50 m backstroke	Natsumi Sakai; Japan Jade Hannah; Canada	27.93	None awarded		Grace Ariola; United States	28.11
100 m backstroke	Regan Smith; United States	59.11; WJ	Taylor Ruck; Canada	59.23	Jade Hannah; Canada	59.62
200 m backstroke	Regan Smith; United States	2:07.45; CR	Alexandra Sumner; United States	2:09.04	Natsumi Sakai; Japan	2:09.34
50 m breaststroke	Emily Weiss; United States	30.78	Faith Knelson; Canada	30.91	Mona McSharry; Ireland	30.97
100 m breaststroke	Mona McSharry; Ireland	1:07.10; NR	Faith Knelson; Canada	1:07.47	Zoe Bartel; United States	1:07.63
200 m breaststroke	Zoe Bartel; United States	2:25.68	Ella Nelson; United States	2:27.04	Annabel Guye-Johnson; Great Britain	2:27.42
50 m butterfly	Rikako Ikee; Japan	25.46; WJ, NR	Sara Junevik; Sweden	26.18	Rebecca Smith; Canada	26.22
100 m butterfly	Rikako Ikee; Japan	57.25; CR	Rebecca Smith; Canada	58.07	Suzuka Hasegawa; Japan	58.60
200 m butterfly	Emily Large; Great Britain	2:07.74; CR	Suzuka Hasegawa; Japan	2:08.29	Keanna MacInnes; Great Britain	2:09.64
200 m individual medley	Miku Kojima; Japan	2:12.42	Kayla Sanchez; Canada	2:12.64	Cyrielle Duhamel; France	2:13.31
400 m individual medley	Miku Kojima; Japan	4:39.14	Anna Sasaki; Japan	4:40.99	Anja Crevar; Serbia	4:42.24
4×100 m freestyle relay	Canada (CAN); Taylor Ruck (53.63) CR; Penny Oleksiak (53.70); Rebecca Smith (54.65); Kayla Sanchez (54.21); Faith Knelson	3:36.19; WJ	United States (USA); Lucie Nordmann (55.15); Alex Walsh (54.87); Julia Cook (55.39); Grace Ariola (54.28); Kate Douglass; Kelly Pash	3:39.69	Japan (JPN); Sayuki Ouchi (55.61); Miku Kojima (56.37); Rikako Ikee (53.35); Natsumi Sakai (55.26); Anna Sasaki	3:40.59
4×200 m freestyle relay	Canada (CAN); Kayla Sanchez (1:59.01); Penny Oleksiak (1:56.86); Rebecca Smith (1:58.66); Taylor Ruck (1:56.94); Mabel Zavaros	7:51.47; WJ	Russia (RUS); Irina Krivonogova (1:58.61); Polina Nevmovenko (2:00.50); Vasilissa Buinaia (2:00.37); Anastasiia Kirpichnikova (1:57.85); Katarina Milutinovich	7:57.33	Japan (JPN); Waka Kobori (2:00.53); Rikako Ikee (1:56.54); Sayuki Ouchi (2:01.11); Suzuka Hasegawa (2:03.91)	8:02.09
4×100 m medley relay	Canada (CAN); Jade Hannah (1:00.68); Faith Knelson (1:07.86); Penny Oleksiak (56.91); Taylor Ruck (52.93); Kayla Sanchez	3:58.38; WJ	United States (USA); Regan Smith (59.11) =WJ; Zoe Bartel (1:07.17); Lucie Nordmann (58.66); Grace Ariola (54.25); Alexandra Sumner; Emily Weiss; Kelly Pash; Alex Walsh	3:59.19	Japan (JPN); Natsumi Sakai (59.77); Miku Kojima (1:09.01); Rikako Ikee (56.94); Sayuki Ouchi (54.25); Suzuka Hasegawa; Anna Sasaki	3:59.97

=== Mixed ===
Event	Gold		Silver		Bronze	
4×100 m freestyle relay^{[c]}	Canada (CAN); Ruslan Gaziev (49.99); Alexander Pratt (50.95); Taylor Ruck (52.72); Penny Oleksiak (52.99)	3:26.65; WJ	Australia (AUS); Elijah Winnington (49.66); Jordan Brunt (49.22); Jemima Horwood (54.89); Eliza King (54.80); Zachary Attard	3:28.57	Russia (RUS); Ivan Girev (48.64); Andrey Minakov (49.42); Irina Krivonogova (55.47); Vasilissa Buinaia (55.30); Georgii Goriachev; Gleb Karasev; Anastasiia Kirpichnikova	3:28.83
4×100 m medley relay	Canada (CAN); Taylor Ruck (59.27); Gabe Mastromatteo (1:00.81); Penny Oleksiak (56.98); Ruslan Gaziev (49.30); Jade Hannah; Mabel Zavaros	3:46.36	United States (USA); Regan Smith (58.95)^{[b]} Reece Whitley (59.42); Nicolas Alberio (53.66); Grace Ariola (54.77); Lucie Nordmann; Daniel Roy; Cody Bybee; Julia Cook	3:46.80	Russia (RUS); Polina Egorova (1:00.84); Evgenii Somov (1:00.89); Egor Kuimov (51.65); Vasilissa Buinaia (54.94); Anastasiia Avdeeva; Vladislav Gerasimenko; Sofya Lobova; Gleb Karasev	3:48.32

=== Notes ===
Relay medalists in italics participated in the heats only.
^{a} Subsequently broken by Taylor Ruck in the women's 4×100 freestyle relay.
^{b} Not recognized as a record as it was set in a mixed relay.
^{c} Matthew Willenbring of USA originally finished third in men's 100m freestyle, but later was disqualified for doping. FINA also decided to disqualify men's 4 × 100 m freestyle and 4 × 100 m medley relays and 4 × 100 m mixed freestyle relay in which Willenbring had swum.

== Participating countries ==
Competitors from the following 90 countries participated at the Championships.

- Albania (3)
- Algeria (3)
- Antigua and Barbuda (6)
- Argentina (8)
- Armenia (3)
- Aruba (3)
- Australia (30)
- Austria (2)
- Bahamas (3)
- Barbados (3)
- Belarus (4)
- Belgium (2)
- Bermuda (2)
- Bolivia (7)
- Bosnia and Herzegovina (3)
- Botswana (7)
- Brazil (16)
- British Virgin Islands (1)
- Bulgaria (5)
- Canada (14)
- Chile (7)
- China (8)
- Colombia (8)
- Costa Rica (6)
- Croatia (2)
- Curaçao (4)
- Czech Republic (6)
- Denmark (4)
- Dominican Republic (7)
- Ecuador (4)
- Egypt (5)
- Estonia (5)
- Fiji (6)
- France (6)
- Great Britain (22)
- Germany (21)
- Greece (4)
- Guatemala (10)
- Honduras (20)
- Hungary (14)
- India (6)
- Ireland (6)
- Italy (15)
- Japan (13)
- Kazakhstan (4)
- Kenya (1)
- Kyrgyzstan (3)
- Lebanon (4)
- Liechtenstein (1)
- Lithuania (3)
- Marshall Islands (2)
- Mexico (17)
- Moldova (1)
- Mongolia (5)
- Mozambique (4)
- Namibia (2)
- Nepal (7)
- Pakistan (4)
- Panama (3)
- Paraguay (15)
- Peru (4)
- Philippines (6)
- Poland (14)
- Portugal (1)
- Puerto Rico (7)
- Romania (2)
- Russia (26)
- Rwanda (1)
- Saint Lucia (1)
- Senegal (1)
- Serbia (3)
- Singapore (5)
- Slovakia (12)
- Slovenia (8)
- South Africa (16)
- South Korea (1)
- Spain (17)
- Sri Lanka (8)
- Sweden (3)
- Tanzania (3)
- Trinidad and Tobago (2)
- Tunisia (2)
- Turkey (7)
- Ukraine (4)
- Uruguay (2)
- United States (41)
- United States Virgin Islands (4)
- Uzbekistan (1)
- Venezuela (4)
- Zimbabwe (3)
