= Swimming at the 2018 Asian Games – Women's 200 metre breaststroke =

Women's 200 metre breaststroke at the 2018 Asian Games
- Venue: Gelora Bung Karno Aquatic Stadium
- Date: 20 August 2018
- Competitors: 17 from 12 nations

Medalists
gold medal	Kanako Watanabe	Japan
silver medal	Yu Jingyao	China
bronze medal	Reona Aoki	Japan

The women's 200 metre breaststroke event at the 2018 Asian Games took place on 20 August at the Gelora Bung Karno Aquatic Stadium.

== Schedule ==
All times are Western Indonesia Time (UTC+07:00)

Date	Time	Event
Monday, 20 August 2018	09:58	Heats
Monday, 20 August 2018	19:16	Final

== Records ==
Prior to this competition, the existing world, Asian and Games records were as follows.

World Record	Rikke Møller Pedersen (DEN)	2:19.11	Barcelona, Spain	1 August 2013
Asian Record	Rie Kaneto (JPN)	2:19.65	Tokyo, Japan	9 April 2016
Games Record	Kanako Watanabe (JPN)	2:21.82	Incheon, South Korea	22 September 2014

== Results ==
=== Heats ===
Rank	Heat	Athlete	Time	Notes
1	2	Kanako Watanabe (JPN)	2:27.05	
2	2	Zhang Xinyu (CHN)	2:28.48	
3	3	Reona Aoki (JPN)	2:29.16	
4	1	Yu Jingyao (CHN)	2:29.76	
5	3	Back Su-yeon (KOR)	2:30.63	
6	3	Jamie Yeung (HKG)	2:32.05	
7	3	Samantha Yeo (SGP)	2:33.74	
8	1	Lin Pei-wun (TPE)	2:35.16	
9	2	Anandia Evato (INA)	2:35.33	
10	2	Azzahra Permatahani (INA)	2:35.71	
11	1	Kim Hye-jin (KOR)	2:36.26	
12	2	Wang Chin Lam (HKG)	2:40.52	
13	1	Ngô Thị Ngọc Quỳnh (VIE)	2:44.84	
14	3	Cheang Weng Lam (MAC)	2:48.37	
15	2	Nooran Ba Matraf (YEM)	2:53.11	
16	1	Mera Abushammaleh (PLE)	2:55.44	
17	3	Aishath Hulva Khulail (MDV)	3:34.83	

=== Final ===
Rank	Athlete	Time	Notes
1st place, gold medalist(s)	Kanako Watanabe (JPN)	2:23.05	
2nd place, silver medalist(s)	Yu Jingyao (CHN)	2:23.31	
3rd place, bronze medalist(s)	Reona Aoki (JPN)	2:23.33	
4	Zhang Xinyu (CHN)	2:26.24	
5	Back Su-yeon (KOR)	2:28.48	
6	Jamie Yeung (HKG)	2:29.81	
7	Lin Pei-wun (TPE)	2:33.39	
8	Samantha Yeo (SGP)	2:33.75	
