= Faith Knelson =

Canadian swimmer (born 2001)

Personal information
- Born: 9 September 2001 (age 25) Nanaimo, British Columbia, Canada
- Home town: Ladysmith, British Columbia, Canada
- Height: 175 cm (5 ft 9 in)
- Weight: 65 kg (143 lb)

Sport
- Sport: Swimming
- Strokes: Breaststroke
- Club: Ladysmith Chemainus Swim Club/Island Swimming Club
- College team: Vanderbilt Commodores
- Coach: Ryan Mallette
Medal record
Women's swimming
Representing Canada
Pan American Games
Silver medal – second place	2019 Lima	4×100 m medley
Bronze medal – third place	2019 Lima	100 m breaststroke
World Junior Championships
Gold medal – first place	2017 Indianapolis	4×100 m medley
Gold medal – first place	2017 Indianapolis	4×100 m freestyle
Silver medal – second place	2017 Indianapolis	50 m breastroke
Silver medal – second place	2017 Indianapolis	100 m breastroke

Faith Anya Knelson (born 9 September 2001) is a Canadian swimmer. She competed at the 2017 World Junior Swimming Championships in Indianapolis, where she was part of a Canadian team that set the junior world record and championship record in the girls' 4×100 m medley.

In total, she won 4 medals at the world junior championships, including two gold and two silver. She finished 4th in the 100m breaststroke in a time of 1:07.84, and 7th in a time of 30.98 at the 2018 Commonwealth Games, which was the first major senior national meet for Knelson. Knelson spent her childhood training with the Ladysmith Chemainus Swim Club, in her hometown of Ladysmith, British Columbia, but made the move to Victoria to train with Swimming NextGen, one of Canada's elite training centres for the country's top swimmers.

== Career ==
At the 2017 Canadian Swimming Trials, Knelson claimed a silver in the 50-m breaststroke and a bronze in the 100-m breast. At the 2017 Canadian Swimming Championships, Knelson was strong in the breaststroke events, winning gold in the 50-m, silver in the 100-m and bronze in the 200-m. She was also a member of the women’s 4×100-m medley relay team that took home the gold medal. At the 2017 FINA World Junior Championships in Indianapolis, she won gold in the women's 4×100-m medley relay. She also added a pair of silver medals in the 50-m and 100-m breaststroke.

In September 2017, Knelson was named to Canada's 2018 Commonwealth Games team. At those games, Knelson placed fourth in the 100-m breaststroke and seventh in the 50-m breaststroke.

== Personal bests ==
=== Short course (25 m pool) ===
Event	Time	Venue	Date	Notes
50 m breaststroke	31.18	Ontario Junior International	15 December 2016	
100 m breaststroke	1:06.06	Ontario Junior International	15 December 2017	
200 m breaststroke	2:27.15	Ontario Junior International	16 December 2017	

=== Long course (50 m pool) ===
Event	Time	Venue	Date	Notes
50 m breaststroke	30.91	2017 FINA World Junior Swimming Championships	24 August 2017	
100 m breaststroke	1:07.30	XXI Commonwealth Games	8 April 2018	
200 m breaststroke	2:28.45	Canadian Championships	4 August 2017	
