= Annabel Guye-Johnson =

English swimmer

Personal information
- Born: 15 March 2000 (age 26) Tunbridge Wells, Great Britain

Sport
- Sport: Swimming
- Strokes: Breaststroke
- Club: Royal Tunbridge Wells Monson Swimming Club
Medal record
Representing Great Britain
World Junior Championships
Bronze medal – third place	2017 Indianapolis	200m breaststroke

Annabel Elizabeth Guye-Johnson (born 15 March 2000) is a Kent County youth swimming champion. She was the 2016 50 meter breaststroke British Champion. In 2017, she represented the UK at the 2017 FINA World Junior Swimming Championships in Indianapolis, where she won a bronze medal in the 200 meter Breaststroke.
