= Beatriz Travalon =

Brazilian swimmer (born 1993)

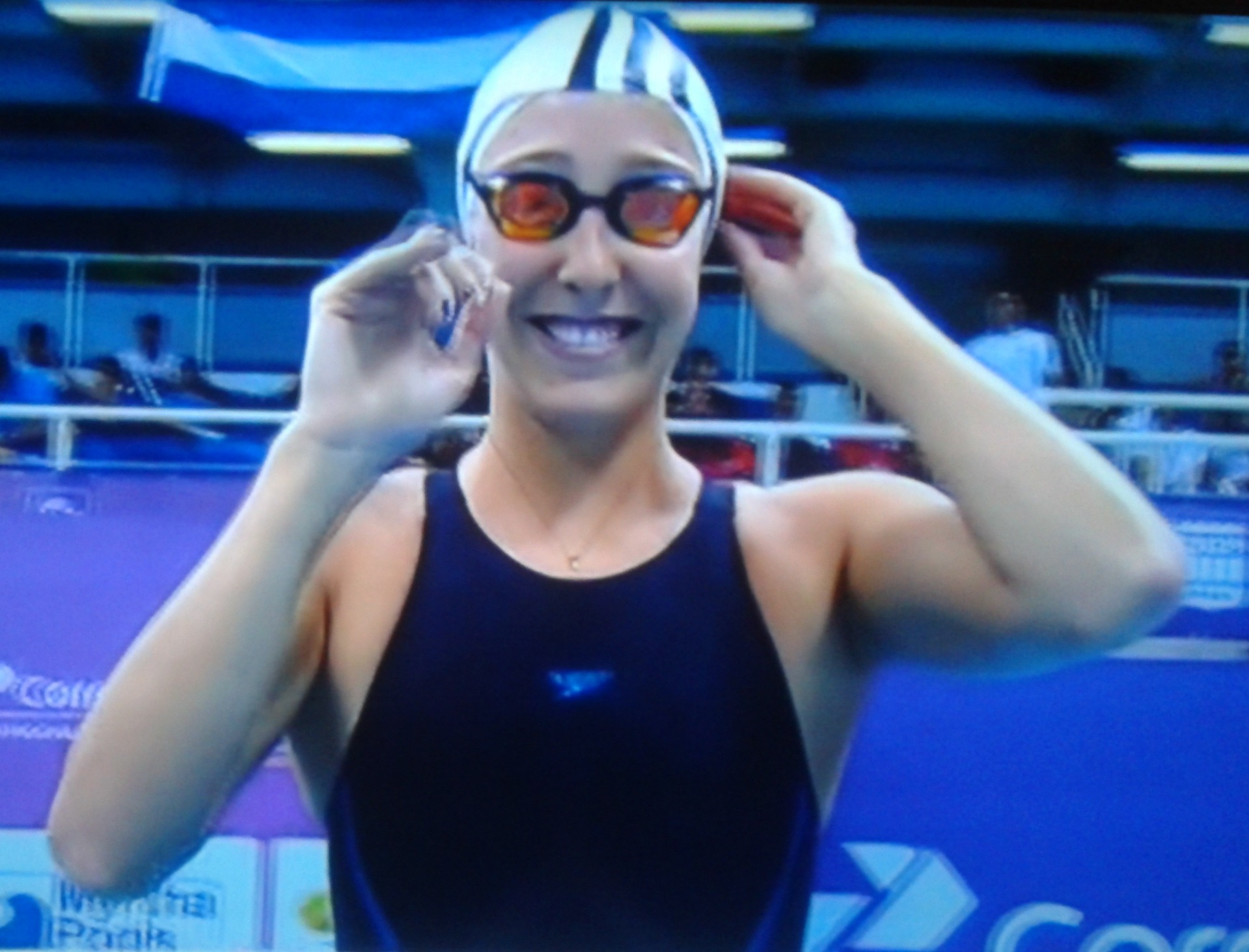

Personal information
- Full name: Beatriz Azzolini Travalon
- Nationality: Brazil
- Born: July 19, 1993 (age 32) Santo André, São Paulo, Brazil
- Height: 1.74 m (5 ft 9 in)
- Weight: 54 kg (119 lb)

Sport
- Sport: Swimming
- Strokes: Breaststroke
Medal record
Women's swimming
Representing Brazil
Pan American Games
Bronze medal – third place	2015 Toronto	4×100 m medley
South American Games
Gold medal – first place	2014 Santiago	4x100 m medley

Beatriz Azzolini Travalon (born July 19, 1993, in Santo André, São Paulo) is a breaststroke swimmer from Brazil.

At the 2012 FINA World Swimming Championships (25 m) in Istanbul, she finished 10th in the 4×100-metre medley, 13th in the 50-metre breaststroke semifinal, and 28th in the 100-metre breaststroke. Travalon broke the South American record in the 4×100-metre medley, with a time of 3:57.66, along with Fabíola Molina, Daynara de Paula and Larissa Oliveira.

She classified to swim at three proofs in the 2013 World Aquatics Championships in Barcelona. Travalon finished 20th in the 50-metre breaststroke, 39th in the 100-metre breaststroke and 12th in the 4×100-metre medley, along with Etiene Medeiros, Larissa Oliveira and Daynara de Paula.

At the 2014 South American Games, Travalon won a gold medal in the 4 × 100 metre medley relay.

At the 2015 Pan American Games in Toronto, Ontario, Canada, Travalon won a bronze medal in the 4 × 100 metre medley relay, by participating at heats. She also finished 6th in the 100 metre breaststroke, and 11th in the 200 metre breaststroke.
