= Annie Lazor =

American swimmer (born 1994)

Personal information
- Full name: Anne Denise Lanza
- Nickname: Anne
- National team: United States
- Born: Anne Denise Lazor; August 17, 1994 (age 32) Detroit, Michigan, U.S.
- Height: 5 ft 8 in (173 cm)

Sport
- Sport: Swimming
- Strokes: Breaststroke
- College team: Ohio State Buckeyes (2012–2013); Auburn Tigers (2013–2016)
- Coach: Ray Looze
Medal record
Women's swimming
Representing United States
Olympic Games
Bronze medal – third place	2020 Tokyo	200 m breaststroke
World Championships (SC)
Gold medal – first place	2018 Hangzhou	200 m breaststroke
Silver medal – second place	2022 Melbourne	4×50 m medley
Pan American Games
Gold medal – first place	2019 Lima	100 m breaststroke
Gold medal – first place	2019 Lima	200 m breaststroke
Gold medal – first place	2019 Lima	4×100 m medley
Bronze medal – third place	2015 Toronto	200 m breaststroke

Anne Denise Lanza (née Lazor; born August 17, 1994), commonly known as Annie Lazor, is a retired American competitive swimmer. She competed at the 2020 Summer Olympics, where she won the bronze medal in the 200 m breaststroke.

== Early life and education ==
Lazor was born in Detroit, Michigan, to David and Stacey Lazor. She has two siblings. Lazor attended Wylie E. Groves High School in Beverly Hills, Michigan, where she was a state champion in swimming. She graduated from high school in 2012. In 2016, she graduated from Auburn University.

== Swimming career ==
Lazor competed at the 2010 USA Swimming Championships, where she finished 44th in the 100 m breaststroke.

At the 2011 USA Swimming Championships, she tied for 52nd in the 100 m breaststroke and tied for 36th in the 200 m breaststroke.

At the 2012 United States Olympic Trials, she finished 51st in the 100 m breaststroke and 15th in the 200 m breaststroke.

Lazor started her NCAA career with the Ohio State Buckeyes in 2012–13. She finished 8th in the 200 y breaststroke at the 2013 Big Ten Championships.

At the 2013 USA Swimming Championships, she finished 21st in the 50 m breaststroke, 23rd in the 100 m breaststroke, and 12th in the 200 m breaststroke.

Lazor started competing for the Auburn Tigers during her NCAA sophomore season in 2013–14. She competed in the 100 y breaststroke, 200 y breaststroke, and 200 y individual medley at the SEC Championships.

At the 2014 USA Swimming Championships, she finished 34th in the 50 m breaststroke, 35th in the 100 m breaststroke, and 8th in the 200 m breaststroke.

At the SEC Championships during her junior season in 2014–15, Lazor finished 6th in the 100 y breaststroke (59.82) and 5th in the 200 y breaststroke (2:09.24). She helped Auburn finish 5th in the 4x100 y medley relay (3:34.58). At the 2015 NCAA Championships, she finished 20th in the 100 y breaststroke (1:00.14) and 10th in the 200 y breaststroke with a personal best time of 2:08.41. She helped her team finish 14th in the 4x100 y medley relay (3:33.92).

At the 2015 USA Swimming Championships, she finished 26th in the 100 m breaststroke and 8th in the 200 m breaststroke.

At the 2016 NCAA Championships, she finished 13th in the 100 y breaststroke and 13th in the 200 y breaststroke. She helped her team finish 21st in the 4x100 y medley relay.

Lazor competed at the 2016 United States Olympic Trials, where she finished 10th in the 100 m breaststroke and 7th in the 200 m breaststroke.

At the 2018 USA Swimming Championships, she tied for 12th in the 100 m breaststroke and finished 3rd in the 200 m breaststroke.

At the 2018 FINA World Swimming Championships (25 m), she won the gold medal in the 200 m breaststroke (2:18.32).

Lazor competed at the 2019 Pan American Games, where she won gold medals in the 100 m breaststroke, 200 m breaststroke, and 4 × 100 m medley relay.

At the 2020 United States Olympic Trials, she finished 3rd in the 100 m breaststroke (1:05.60) and 1st in the 200 m breaststroke (2:21.07).

At the 2020 Summer Olympics, she won the bronze medal in the 200 m breaststroke (2:20.84).

On Jun 30, 2023, she retired from competitive swimming and moved to coaching at the University of Florida.

== Personal best times ==
=== Long course meters (50 m pool) ===
Event	Time	Meet	Location	Date	Notes
50 m breaststroke	30.75	2020 US Olympic Trials	Omaha, Nebraska	June 14, 2021	†
100 m breaststroke	1:05.37	2020 US Olympic Trials	Omaha, Nebraska	June 14, 2021	
200 m breaststroke	2:20.77	2021 TYR Pro Swim Series - Bloomington	Bloomington, Indiana	May 19, 2021	

Legend: † – achieved en route to final mark

=== Short course meters (25 m pool) ===
Event	Time	Meet	Location	Date
50 m breaststroke	29.83	2020 International Swimming League	Budapest, Hungary	November 22, 2020
100 m breaststroke	1:03.69	2020 International Swimming League	Budapest, Hungary	November 22, 2020
200 m breaststroke	2:16.33	2020 International Swimming League	Budapest, Hungary	November 21, 2020

== Awards and honors ==
- Golden Goggle Award nominee and recipient, Perseverance Award: 2021

== Personal life ==
On December 22, 2022, Lazor announced her engagement to fellow Olympian and Brazilian swimmer Vinicius Lanza whom she had known from training extensively with at Indiana University in Bloomington.
