= Swimming at the 2010 South American Games – Women's 4 × 100 metre medley relay =

The Women's 4x100m medley relay event at the 2010 South American Games was held on March 29 at 18:30.

== Medalists ==
Gold	Silver	Bronze
Fabíola Molina; Tatiane Sakemi; Daynara de Paula; Tatiana Barbosa; Brazil	Cecilia Bertoncello; Agustina de Giovanni; Georgina Bardach; Nadia Colovini; Argentina	Carolina Colorado Henao; Monica Álvarez; María Clara Sosa; Erika Stewart; Colombia

== Records ==
Standing records prior to the 2010 South American Games
World record	China	3:52.19	Rome, Italy	1 August 2009
Competition Record	Venezuela	4:18.47	Buenos Aires, Argentina	18 November 2006
South American record	Brazil	3:58.49	Rome, Italy	1 August 2009

== Results ==
=== Final ===
Rank	Lane	Athlete	Result	Notes
1st place, gold medalist(s)	4	Brazil	4:13.97	CR
1st place, gold medalist(s)	4	Fabíola Molina	1:03.52	CR
1st place, gold medalist(s)	4	Tatiane Sakemi	1:13.33	CR
1st place, gold medalist(s)	4	Daynara de Paula	1:00.54	CR
1st place, gold medalist(s)	4	Tatiana Barbosa	56.58	CR
2nd place, silver medalist(s)	3	Argentina	4:18.10	
2nd place, silver medalist(s)	3	Cecilia Bertoncello	1:07.28	
2nd place, silver medalist(s)	3	Agustina de Giovanni	1:10.12	
2nd place, silver medalist(s)	3	Georgina Bardach	1:02.97	
2nd place, silver medalist(s)	3	Nadia Colovini	57.73	
3rd place, bronze medalist(s)	6	Colombia	4:20.53	
3rd place, bronze medalist(s)	6	Carolina Colorado Henao	1:03.51	
3rd place, bronze medalist(s)	6	Monica Álvarez	1:14.68	
3rd place, bronze medalist(s)	6	María Clara Sosa	1:03.72	
3rd place, bronze medalist(s)	6	Erika Stewart	58.62	
4	5	Venezuela	4:24.23	
4	5	Jeserik Pinto	1:06.56	
4	5	Daniela Victoria	1:15.66	
4	5	Elimar Barrios	1:03.94	
4	5	Arlene Semeco	58.07	
5	7	Peru	4:32.95	
5	7	Massie Milagros Yong	1:07.53	
5	7	Patricia Mariana San Martin	1:18.52	
5	7	Maria Graciela Rosales	1:06.81	
5	7	Maria Alejandra Perez	1:00.09	
6	2	Ecuador	4:36.83	
6	2	Diana An Yu Ibarra	1:06.71	
6	2	Camila Isabel Espinosa	1:19.56	
6	2	Yamilé Bahamonde	1:08.06	
6	2	Nicole Maria Gilbert	1:02.50	
7	1	Uruguay	4:42.44	
7	1	Ines Remersaro	1:018.36	
7	1	Antonella Scanavino	1:20.17	
7	1	Raissa Andrea Guerra	1:08.50	
7	1	Maria Sanchez	1:05.41	
8	8	Paraguay	4:47.78	
8	8	Maria Laura Britez	1:08.78	
8	8	Lujan Vargas	1:21.88	
8	8	Silvana Valenzuela	1:13.20	
8	8	Maria Nery Huerta	1:03.92	
