= Jade Hannah =

Canadian swimmer (born 2002)

Personal information
- Nickname: J
- Nationality: Bermudian / Canadian
- Born: 24 January 2002 (age 24) Paget, Bermuda
- Height: 180 cm (5 ft 11 in)
- Weight: 68 kg (150 lb)

Sport
- Sport: Swimming
- Strokes: Backstroke
- Club: Halifax Trojan Club
- Coach: Ben Titley
Medal record
Women's swimming
Representing Canada
World Junior Championships
Gold medal – first place	2017 Indianapolis	50 m backstroke
Gold medal – first place	2017 Indianapolis	4×100 m medley
Gold medal – first place	2017 Indianapolis	4×100 m mixed medley
Gold medal – first place	2019 Budapest	100 m backstroke
Gold medal – first place	2019 Budapest	200 m backstroke
Silver medal – second place	2019 Budapest	50 m backstroke
Bronze medal – third place	2017 Indianapolis	100 m backstroke
Bronze medal – third place	2019 Budapest	4×100 m medley
Bronze medal – third place	2019 Budapest	4×100 m mixed medley

Jade Hannah (born 24 January 2002) is a Canadian swimmer. She competed at the 2017 World Junior Swimming Championships in Indianapolis where she was part of a Canadian team that set the junior world record and championship record in the girl's 4×100 m medley.

== Career ==
In the 2017 World Junior Swimming Championships, Hannah won four medals at the world junior championships, including three gold and one bronze. She was the reigning junior co-world champion in the 50 m backstroke and won a bronze in the 100 m backstroke.

Hannah added to her world junior medal haul when she added two golds at the 2019 World Junior Swimming Championships in the 100 m and 200 m backstroke, as well as a silver in the 50 m backstroke. She also won two more bronze in the 4×100 m medley and 4×100 m mixed medley. This brought her career world junior total to five gold, one silver and three bronze medals, a sum of nine in all. In September 2017, Hannah was named to Canada's 2018 Commonwealth Games team.

At the age of 14 in September 2016, Hannah and her mother made the move from her hometown of Halifax, Nova Scotia to Victoria, British Columbia in order to train with High Performance Center in Victoria, BC. June 2020, Hannah moved to Toronto to train at the High Performance centre under Ben Titley at one of Canada's elite training facilities for the country's top swimmers.

== Personal bests ==
=== Long course (50 m pool) ===
Event	Time	Venue	Date	Notes
50 m backstroke	27.91	2019 FINA World Junior Swimming Championships	24 August 2019	
100 m backstroke	59.62	2017 FINA World Junior Swimming Championships	24 August 2017	
200 m backstroke	2:09.28	2019 FINA World Junior Swimming Championships	22 August 2019	

=== Short course (25 m pool) ===
Event	Time	Venue	Date	Notes
50 m backstroke	27.09	Ontario Junior International	15 December 2017	
100 m backstroke	58.22	Ontario Junior International	16 December 2017	
200 m backstroke	2:06.65	Ontario Junior International	17 December 2017	
