= Lilly King =

American swimmer (born 1997)

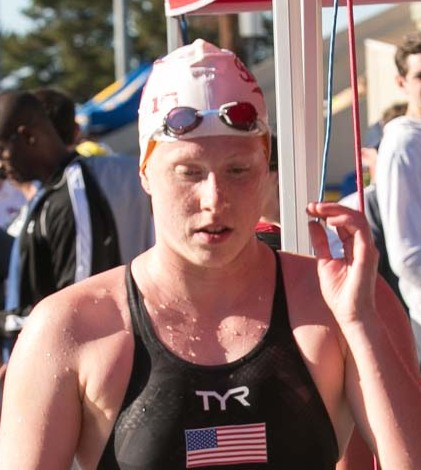
- King in 2018

Personal information
- Full name: Lillia Camille King
- Nickname: King
- National team: United States
- Born: February 10, 1997 (age 29) Evansville, Indiana, U.S.
- Height: 5 ft 8.5 in (174 cm)
- Weight: 154 lb (70 kg)

Sport
- Sport: Swimming
- Strokes: Breaststroke
- Club: Cali Condors; Indiana Swim Club
- College team: Indiana University
Medal record
Women's swimming
Representing United States
Event	1st	2nd	3rd
Olympic Games	3	2	1
World Championships (LC)	12	2	0
World Championships (SC)	7	5	2
Pan Pacific Championships	1	2	0
Total	23	11	3
Olympic Games
Gold medal – first place	2016 Rio de Janeiro	100 m breaststroke
Gold medal – first place	2016 Rio de Janeiro	4×100 m medley
Gold medal – first place	2024 Paris	4×100 m medley
Silver medal – second place	2020 Tokyo	200 m breaststroke
Silver medal – second place	2020 Tokyo	4×100 m medley
Bronze medal – third place	2020 Tokyo	100 m breaststroke
World Championships (LC)
Gold medal – first place	2017 Budapest	50 m breaststroke
Gold medal – first place	2017 Budapest	100 m breaststroke
Gold medal – first place	2017 Budapest	4×100 m medley
Gold medal – first place	2017 Budapest	4×100 m mixed medley
Gold medal – first place	2019 Gwangju	50 m breaststroke
Gold medal – first place	2019 Gwangju	100 m breaststroke
Gold medal – first place	2019 Gwangju	4×100 m medley
Gold medal – first place	2022 Budapest	200 m breaststroke
Gold medal – first place	2022 Budapest	4×100 m medley
Gold medal – first place	2022 Budapest	4×100 m mixed medley
Gold medal – first place	2023 Fukuoka	4×100 m medley
Gold medal – first place	2025 Singapore	4×100 m medley
Silver medal – second place	2019 Gwangju	4×100 m mixed medley
Silver medal – second place	2023 Fukuoka	50 m breaststroke
World Championships (SC)
Gold medal – first place	2016 Windsor	50 m breaststroke
Gold medal – first place	2016 Windsor	4×50 m medley
Gold medal – first place	2016 Windsor	4×100 m medley
Gold medal – first place	2016 Windsor	4×50 m mixed medley
Gold medal – first place	2022 Melbourne	100 m breaststroke
Gold medal – first place	2022 Melbourne	4×100 m medley
Gold medal – first place	2024 Budapest	4×100 m medley
Silver medal – second place	2016 Windsor	100 m breaststroke
Silver medal – second place	2022 Melbourne	200 m breaststroke
Silver medal – second place	2022 Melbourne	4×50 m medley
Silver medal – second place	2024 Budapest	100 m breaststroke
Silver medal – second place	2024 Budapest	4×100 m mixed medley
Bronze medal – third place	2022 Melbourne	50 m breaststroke
Bronze medal – third place	2024 Budapest	50 m breaststroke
Pan Pacific Championships
Gold medal – first place	2018 Tokyo	100 m breaststroke
Silver medal – second place	2018 Tokyo	200 m breaststroke
Silver medal – second place	2018 Tokyo	4×100 m medley
Junior Pan Pac Championships
Gold medal – first place	2014 Maui	100 m breaststroke
Gold medal – first place	2014 Maui	4×100 m medley

Lillia Camille King (born February 10, 1997) is an American former competitive swimmer who specialized in breaststroke. At the 2016 Summer Olympics, she won the gold medal in the 100-meter breaststroke competition and also won a gold medal in the 4x100 meter medley relay, in which she swam the breaststroke leg. At the 2020 Summer Olympics, King won a silver medal in the 4x100 meter medley relay for her efforts in the prelims, the silver medal in the 200-meter breaststroke, and the bronze medal in the 100-meter breaststroke. At the 2024 Summer Olympics, she won a gold medal in the 4x100 meter medley relay, where she swam the breaststroke leg. She is the current world record holder in the long course 100-meter breaststroke.

King retired from competitive swimming after the 2025 World Aquatics Championships in Singapore.

== Early life ==
King was born and raised in Evansville, Indiana, the daughter of Mark and Ginny King. Mark ran track and cross-country at Indiana State University, and Ginny swam for Eastern Kentucky University and Illinois State University. King's younger brother Alex is a walk-on swimmer at the University of Michigan. King attended FJ Reitz High School, where the school's swim team shared Lloyd Pool with five other teams. The lanes at Lloyd Pool were often overcrowded, preventing King from receiving the necessary workout she required to perform at her best competitive level, so to help compensate, King added several morning practices a week with the local masters team and joined a competitive swim team called the Newburgh Sea Creatures.

== Career ==
=== Early career ===
To gain additional competition experience in her teenage years, King swam unattached at junior national championships, with a standout performance in the 200-yard breaststroke at the 2012 Winter Junior National Championships. As a 17-year-old at the 2014 Junior Pan Pacific Swimming Championships, held in Hawaii, she won gold medals in the 100 meter breaststroke with a Championships record time of 1:07.98, and the 4×100 meter medley relay with a Championships record of 4:03.44, and placed fourth in the 200 meter breaststroke with a time of 2:29.83.

=== College ===
King attended Indiana University Bloomington, where she competed for the Indiana Hoosiers swimming and diving team.

At the NCAA Women's Division I Swimming and Diving Championships during her first year, she was the NCAA Champion in the 100 yard breaststroke (56.85) and 200 yard breaststroke (2:03.59). The performance established King as one of the best short course yards breaststroke swimmers in history, setting the American, NCAA, NCAA Meet, U.S. Open, Indiana school, Big Ten, and Georgia Tech Pool records in winning the NCAA titles. That same first year she was named the Big Ten Swimmer of the Year, earned four All-America honors, First-Team All-Big Ten, and Big Ten Freshman of the Year. King continued her elite success by claiming the 100 yard breaststroke and 200 yard breaststroke titles throughout her collegiate career and was only the 2nd swimmer ever to sweep the two events for all four years. As a senior, she won the Honda Sports Award as the nation's best female swimmer.

=== 2016 Summer Olympics ===
2016 Summer Olympics
Gold medal – first place	100 m breaststroke	1:04.93 (OR)
Gold medal – first place	4x100 m medley relay	3:53.13

At the 2016 US Olympic trials in Omaha, King won both the 100 meter breaststroke and the 200 meter breaststroke, qualifying for the 2016 Summer Olympics in Rio de Janeiro.

In the 100-meter breaststroke heats, King finished first with a time of 1:05.78 and qualified for the semifinals. There she again finished first with a time of 1:05.70. The next fastest swimmer was Yuliya Yefimova from Russia, the reigning world champion who had previously served a 16-month doping suspension for failing a 2013 drug test. Yefimova also failed a drug test in 2016, but with no research on how long the drug stayed in a person's system, she was not banned or given a suspension. As King looked on from the ready room, where swimmers gather before they race, Yefimova won her semifinal and wagged her index finger, apparently in imitation of King's own finger wag in an earlier heat. After posting the fastest time in the 100 m breaststroke semifinals, King expressed distaste. In a post-race interview with NBC and reported on by The New York Times, King said, "You wave your finger No. 1 and you've been caught drug cheating? I'm not a fan." King went on to win the Olympic gold medal in the 100-meter breaststroke, setting an Olympic record of 1:04.93 in the process.

In the 200-meter breaststroke heats, King finished 15th with a time of 2:25.89 and qualified for the semifinals. She finished 7th in her semifinal with a time of 2:24.59. She did not qualify for the final. Charlotte Wilder of USA Today said King and Yefimova's rivalry "was heightened by the backstory, the international rivalry, and the high stakes of a final event. It was the Olympics at its very, very best." Mike Decourcy and Tom Gatto of Sporting News noted the two swimmers "joined the list of the hottest U.S.-Soviet/Russian head-to-heads in sports history." As a result of her approach to the 2016 Summer Olympics and her rivalry with Yefimova, Pat Forde of Yahoo! Sports said King developed a reputation as being "friendly but fiery, with no filter and no apologies." Journalists from The Washington Post and the Associated Press criticized King's treatment of Yefimova.

=== 2017 World Championships ===
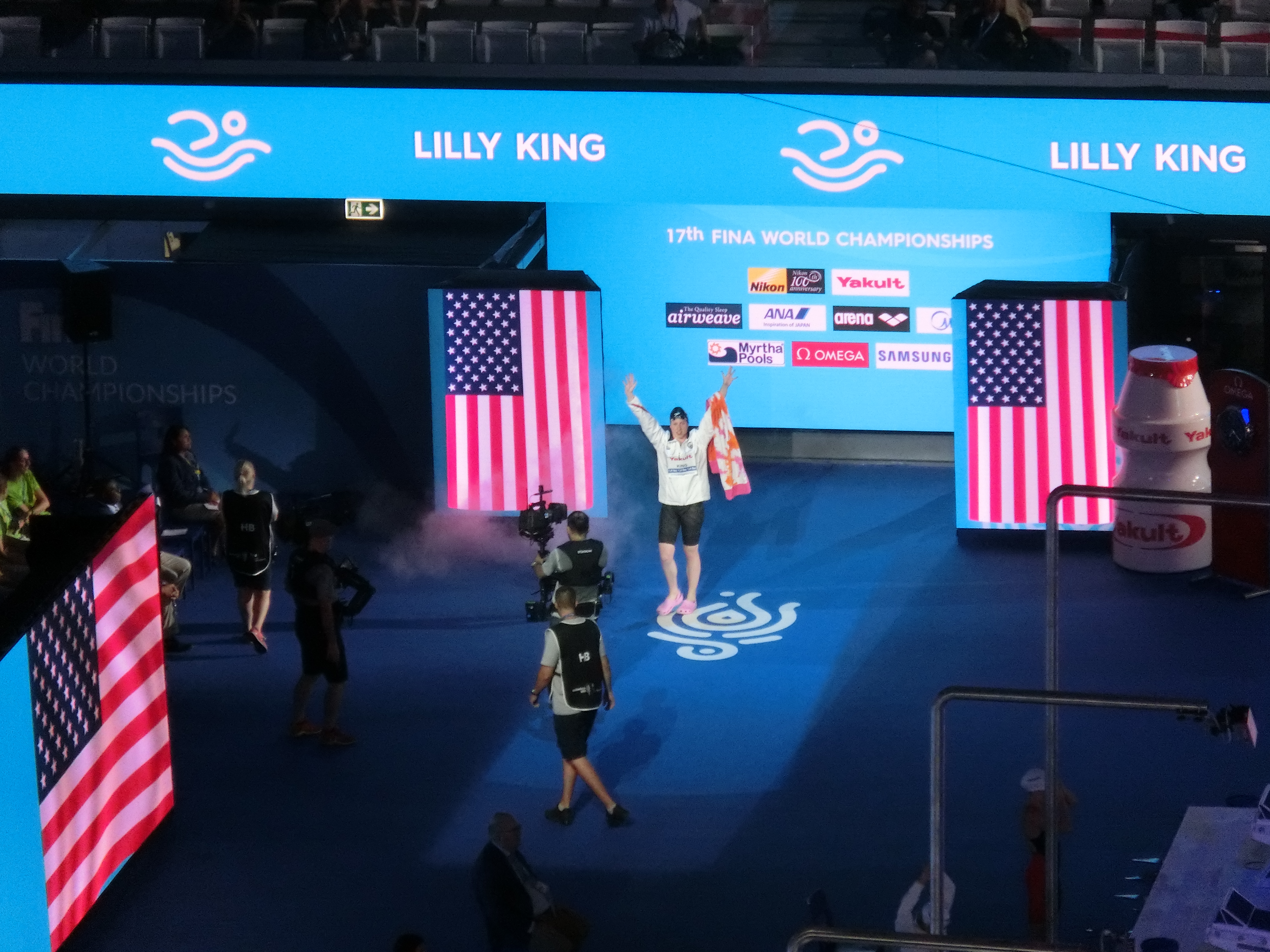
King at the 2017 World Championships in Budapest

At the 2017 US Nationals, the qualification meet for the World Aquatics Championships in Budapest, King swept the breaststroke events. She won the 50-meter breaststroke with a time of 29.66, the 100-meter breaststroke with 1:04.95, and the 200-meter breaststroke with 2:21.83.

In her first event at the 2017 World Championships, King won the 100-meter breaststroke with a world record time of 1:04.13. King's American teammate Katie Meili finished second and Yulia Efimova touched third. The race was highly anticipated because Efimova had nearly broken the former world record and mockingly wagged her finger during the semifinal.

=== 2018 ===
At the 2018 US Nationals, the qualification meet for the World Aquatics Championships in Gwangju, King won two of three breaststroke events. She dominated the 50-meter breaststroke with a time of 29.82 and the 100-meter breaststroke in 1:05.36. King also placed 5th in the 200-meter breaststroke (2:25.31).

==== 2018 Pan Pacific Championships ====
King competed in a total of three events at the 2018 Pan Pacific Championships held in Tokyo, Japan, in August 2018. She won gold in the 100-meter breaststroke with a time of 1:05.44. In her other two events, she won silver medals, swimming a 2:22.12 in the 200-meter breaststroke and splitting a 1:04.86 on the breaststroke leg of the 4x100-meter medley relay.

=== 2019 ===
==== 2019 World Championships ====
2019 World Championships
Gold medal – first place	50 m breaststroke	29.84
Gold medal – first place	100 m breaststroke	1:04.93
Gold medal – first place	4x100 m medley relay	3:50.40 (WR)
Silver medal – second place	4x100 m mixed medley relay	3:39.10

In her first event at the 2019 World Championships, King won the 100-meter breaststroke in a time of 1:04.93. She also won the 50-meter breaststroke easily with a 29.84. In the 200-meter breaststroke, King was disqualified in the prelims heats for not touching the wall simultaneously with both hands on one of her turns. King swam the breaststroke leg of the 4x100-meter mixed medley relay with Ryan Murphy swimming backstroke, Caeleb Dressel swimming butterfly, and Simone Manuel swimming freestyle. She was the only female swimmer to swim the breaststroke leg of the mixed relay out of all eight relays in the final. The relay finished second, two-hundredths of a second behind the Australian relay team, taking silver in the event. Lastly, King was a part of the world record-breaking 4x100-meter medley relay with Regan Smith, Kelsi Dahlia, and Simone Manuel in a time of 3:50.40.

==== International Swimming League ====
In 2019 she was a member of the inaugural International Swimming League representing the Cali Condors, who finished third place in the final match in Las Vegas, Nevada, in December. King was the only swimmer in the league to go undefeated in multiple matches, winning all 16 events she participated in throughout the season.

=== 2021 ===
==== 2020 US Olympic Trials ====
On the second day of the 2020 US Olympic Trials (delayed to June 2021 due to the COVID-19 pandemic), June 14, 2021, King set a Championship Record in the semifinals of the 100-meter breaststroke swimming a 1:04.72. Her time was also the fastest among women globally in the long course 100-meter breaststroke for the year up to that point in 2021. In the final for the 100-meter breaststroke the evening of the next day of competition, day three, King finished first with a time of 1:04.79, less than a second ahead of second-place finisher Lydia Jacoby, and qualified for the 2020 Summer Olympics in the event. This was King's second time making a US Olympic Team. In her post-win interview for the 100-meter breaststroke on the NBC telecast covering day three of the US Olympic Trials in swimming, King expressed excitement about getting to call herself a two-time Olympian.

In the prelims for the 200-meter breaststroke on day five of competition, King ranked third, swimming a 2:25.82 and advancing to the semifinals. She swam a 2:22.73 in the semifinals, ranking first, and advancing to the final. In the final, King swam a 2:21.75, finishing in second place and qualifying for the 2020 Summer Olympics in the event.

==== 2020 Summer Olympics ====
2020 Summer Olympics
Silver medal – second place	200 m breaststroke	2:19.92
Silver medal – second place	4x100 m medley relay	3:51.73
Bronze medal – third place	100 m breaststroke	1:05.54

Leading up to the 2020 Olympic Games, King spearheaded the topic of cheaters at the Games in the press as early as June, wagging her finger metaphorically before the start of competition to let the other swimmers know how she felt in advance if they cheated.

At the 2020 Summer Olympics in Tokyo, Japan, King swam the third fastest time overall in the prelims of the 100-meter breaststroke and advanced to the semifinals. King advanced to the final with her swim of 1:05.40 in the semifinals, ranking second overall. In the final, King won the bronze medal with a time of 1:05.54, less than a second behind the first-place finisher, American Lydia Jacoby, who swam a 1:04.95. After the race, King said "We love to keep that gold in the USA family... This kid just had the swim of her life and I'm so proud to be her teammate and win bronze for my country."

On day five of competition, King swam a 2:22.10 in her prelims heat of the 200-meter breaststroke, qualifying for the semifinals ranking second overall behind South African Tatjana Schoenmaker. In the semifinals of the event on day six of competition, King qualified for the final, ranking second in her semifinal heat and fifth overall with her time of 2:22:27. In the final of the 200-meter breaststroke, King won the silver medal with a personal best time of 2:19.92.

In the prelims of the 4x100-medley relay, King swam the breaststroke leg of the relay, splitting a 1:05.51 and helped advance the relay to the final ranked second. The finals relay placed second, and King won a silver medal for her efforts along with the other swimmers on the prelims relay and the finals relay.

==== International Swimming League ====
Team Cali Condors selected King to compete for them as part of the 2021 International Swimming League. In the final match of the year, King won the 200 meter breaststroke with a time of 2:17.06, placed second in the 50 meter breaststroke, and was disqualified in the 4x100 meter medley relay for not touching the wall simultaneously with both of her hands on the breaststroke leg of the relay. The second day of final match competition, King won the 100 meter breaststroke with a time of 1:03.75 and earned 10 points for her team. In the 4x100 meter mixed medley relay, King helped earn another 8 points for her team with relay teammates Justin Ress, Caeleb Dressel, and Natalie Hinds by achieving a fifth-place finish. Swimming news agency Swimming World declared King and her disqualification in the 4x100 meter mixed medley relay as the sole reason the Cali Condors lost to Energy Standard in the final match. At the end of the 2021 season, when most valuable player points were summed for all competitors from every match since the start of the International Swimming League in 2019, King ranked third out of 488 competitors with 832 points, trailing the top-ranked competitor Sarah Sjöström by less than 200 points.

=== 2022 ===
At the 2022 FINA World Swimming Championships (25 m) in Melbourne, King won gold in the 100-meter breaststroke and the 4 × 100 m medley relay. King, Claire Curzan, Torri Huske, and Kate Douglass set a new world record of 3.44.35. King took silver in the 200-meter breaststroke and the 4x50 medley relay. She won bronze in the 50-meter breaststroke.

=== 2024 ===
==== 2024 Summer Olympics ====
In prelims for the 100-meter breaststroke, King ranked fifth with a time of 1:06.10 and advanced to the semifinals. In the semifinals, King finished in third with a time of 1:05.64 and qualified for the finals. In the finals, King swam with a time of 1:05.60 and tied for fourth place, missing the bronze medal by 1/100th of a second.

=== 2025 ===
At the 2025 World Aquatics Championships in Singapore, King placed fifth in the women's 50-meter breaststroke final. She announced that this was the final race of her swimming career, and that she was retiring from competitive swimming.

== Awards and honors ==
- On September 11, 2018, the city of Evansville approved the new Deaconess Aquatic Center, which the facility's competition pool is named in honor of King, who personally pushed for the project.
- 2019—Honda Sports Award - Swimming & Diving
- SwimSwam Top 100 (Women's): 2021 (#4), 2022 (#12)
- Golden Goggle Awards, Relay Performance of the Year: 2024

== Personal best times ==
=== Long course meters (50 m pool) ===
Event	Time	Meet	Location	Date	Notes
50 m breaststroke	29.40	2017 World Aquatics Championships	Budapest, Hungary	July 30, 2017	Former WR
100 m breaststroke	1:04.13	2017 World Aquatics Championships	Budapest, Hungary	July 25, 2017	WR
200 m breaststroke	2:19.92	2020 Summer Olympics	Tokyo, Japan	July 29, 2021	

Legend: WR – World record; e – equalled existing record;
Records not set in finals: h – heat; sf – semifinal; r – relay 1st leg; rh – relay heat 1st leg; b – B final; † – en route to final mark; so – swim-off; tt – time trial

=== Short course meters (25 m pool) ===
Event	Time	Meet	Location	Date	Notes
50 m breaststroke	28.77	2020 International Swimming League	Budapest, Hungary	November 21, 2020	NR
100 m breaststroke	1:02.50	2020 International Swimming League	Budapest, Hungary	November 22, 2020	NR
200 m breaststroke	2:15.56	2020 International Swimming League	Budapest, Hungary	November 21, 2020	

Legend: e – equalled existing record; NR – American record;
Records not set in finals: h – heat; sf – semifinal; r – relay 1st leg; rh – relay heat 1st leg; b – B final; † – en route to final mark; so – swim-off; tt – time trial

=== Short course yards (25 yd pool) ===
Event	Time		Meet	Location	Date	Notes
50 yd breaststroke	25.98	†	2019 NCAA Championships	Austin	March 22, 2019	
100 yd breaststroke	55.73		2019 NCAA Championships	Austin	March 22, 2019	NR, US
200 yd breaststroke	2:02.60		2018 NCAA Championships	Columbus	March 17, 2018	Former NR, US

Legend: e – equalled existing record; NR – American record; US – US Open record;
Records not set in finals: h – heat; sf – semifinal; r – relay 1st leg; rh – relay heat 1st leg; b – B final; † – en route to final mark; so – swim-off; tt – time trial

== World records ==
=== Long course meters ===
No.	Event	Time	Meet	Location	Date	Age	Ref
1	100 m breaststroke	1:04.13	2017 World Aquatics Championships	Budapest, Hungary	July 25, 2017	20	
2	50 m breaststroke	29.40	2017 World Aquatics Championships	Budapest, Hungary	July 30, 2017	20	
3	4×100 m medley relay	3:50.40	2019 World Aquatics Championships	Gwangju, South Korea	July 28, 2019	22	

== Personal life ==
Following her win of a silver medal in the 200-meter breaststroke at the 2020 Summer Olympics, King expressed her frustration concerning the negative treatment of athletes who won a medal other than gold by some Americans.

After watching King's 200-meter breaststroke performance at the 2024 Olympic Trials, her boyfriend James Wells proposed to her.

== See also ==
- List of Olympic medalists in swimming (women)
- List of world records in swimming
- World record progression 50 metres breaststroke
- World record progression 100 metres breaststroke
- World record progression 4 × 100 metres medley relay

Records
Preceded by Rūta Meilutytė	Women's 50-meter breaststroke world record-holder (long course); July 30, 2017 – May 22, 2021	Succeeded by Benedetta Pilato
Preceded by Rūta Meilutytė	Women's 100-meter breaststroke world record-holder (long course); July 25, 2017 – present	Succeeded by Incumbent
