= Swimming at the 2010 South American Games – Women's 200 metre breaststroke =

The Women's 200m breaststroke event at the 2010 South American Games was held on March 28, with the heats at 10:36 and the Final at 18:05.

== Medalists ==
Gold	Silver	Bronze
Carolina Mussi; Brazil	Tatiane Sakemi; Brazil	Mijal Asis; Argentina

== Records ==
Standing records prior to the 2010 South American Games
World record	Annamay Pierse (CAN)	2:20.12	Rome, Italy	30 July 2009
Competition Record	Georgina Bardach (ARG)	2:35.48	Buenos Aires, Argentina	17 November 2006
South American record	Carolina Mussi (BRA)	2:27.42	Rio de Janeiro, Brazil	6 May 2009

== Results ==
=== Heats ===
Rank	Heat	Lane	Athlete	Result	Notes
1	1	5	Carolina Mussi (BRA)	2:42.60	Q
2	2	3	Daniela Victoria (VEN)	2:43.65	Q
3	2	4	Tatiane Sakemi (BRA)	2:44.99	Q
4	2	6	Patricia Mariana San Martin (PER)	2:46.02	Q
5	2	5	Mijal Asis (ARG)	2:46.19	Q
6	2	7	Mercedes Toledo (VEN)	2:46.29	Q
7	1	3	Monica Álvarez (COL)	2:49.17	Q
8	2	2	Raysa Malu Ruiz (PER)	2:52.94	Q
9	1	6	Laura Galarza (COL)	2:53.25	
10	1	2	Ashley Bransford (ARU)	2:54.31	
11	2	1	Silvana Valenzuela (PAR)	2:59.87	
12	1	1	Lujan Vargas (PAR)	3:02.74	
	1	4	Agustina de Giovanni (ARG)	DNS	
	1	7	Daniella van den Berg (ARU)	DNS	

=== Final ===
Rank	Lane	Athlete	Result	Notes
1st place, gold medalist(s)	4	Carolina Mussi (BRA)	2:39.75	
2nd place, silver medalist(s)	3	Tatiane Sakemi (BRA)	2:41.22	
3rd place, bronze medalist(s)	2	Mijal Asis (ARG)	2:43.13	
4	5	Daniela Victoria (VEN)	2:44.50	
5	6	Patricia Mariana San Martin (PER)	2:45.25	
6	7	Mercedes Toledo (VEN)	2:45.44	
7	1	Monica Álvarez (COL)	2:48.20	
8	8	Raysa Malu Ruiz (PER)	2:55.16	
