= Bethany Galat =

American swimmer (born 1995)

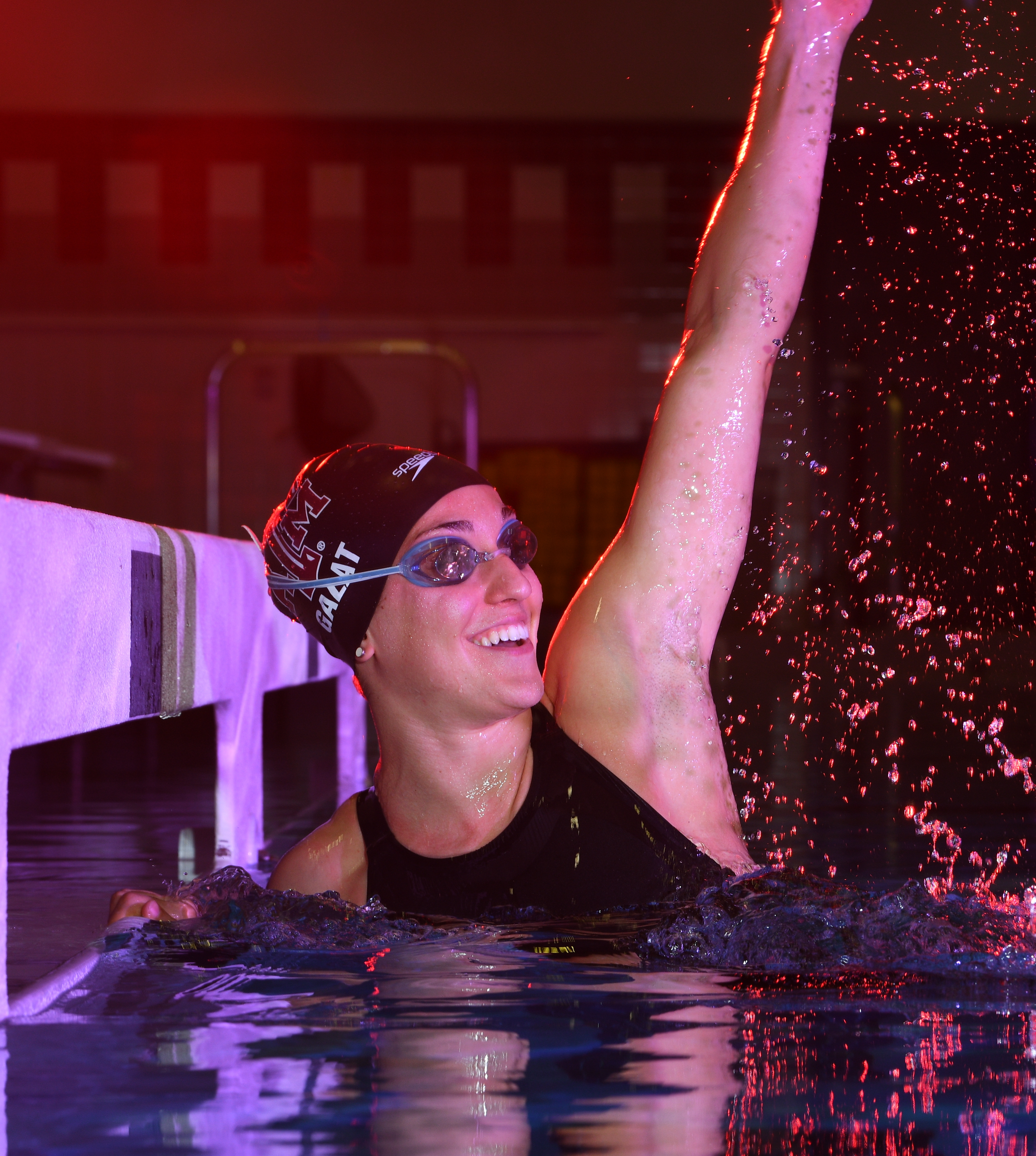
- Galat in 2017

Personal information
- National team: United States
- Born: August 10, 1995 (age 31) Mishawaka, Indiana, U.S.
- Height: 5 ft 9 in (175.3 cm)

Sport
- Sport: Swimming
- Strokes: Breaststroke, individual medley
- Club: South Bend SC
- College team: Texas A&M
- Coach: Van Driessche (South Bend); Steve Bultman (Texas A&M)
Medal record
Representing the United States
World Championships (LC)
Silver medal – second place	2017 Budapest	200 m breaststroke
World Championships (SC)
Silver medal – second place	2018 Hangzhou	200 m breaststroke
Pan American Games
Silver medal – second place	2019 Lima	200 m breaststroke
Representing the Texas A&M Aggies
NCAA Championships
Silver medal – second place	2018 Columbus	200 y breaststroke

Bethany Galat (born August 10, 1995) is an American swimmer specializing in breaststroke, who competed in the women's 200 metre breaststroke event at the 2017 World Aquatics Championships and won the silver medal with a time of 2:21.77. She performed well in both the 2016 and 2020 Olympic trails. Her best Olympic trials performance was two third-place finishes in both the 400 IM and the 200-meter breaststroke in the 2016 Rio de Janeiro Olympic trials staged in Omaha.

== Early life ==
Galat was born August 10, 1955, in Misawaka, Indiana to Coleen and Steve Galat and attended Misawaka's Penn High School, graduating in 2014. During her high school years at Penn, she had a 13th national ranking by collegeswimming.com, and as a Senior was one of the top ranked college recruits for swimmers from Indiana. She was voted a Most Valuable Player each of her four High School years. Beginning around the age of 12, she competed with the South Bend Swim club under Coach Van Driessche, later beginning High School Swimming around 14.

In the summer of her Junior year, August, 2013, she swam a 1:09.14, taking the championship in a close finish in the 100-meter breaststroke at the U.S. Junior Nationals in Irvine, California. That summer she worked as a lifeguard at Blair Hills Pool in greater South Bend. At Penn, she established seven new school records, winning the Indiana State championship in both the 200 Individual Medley from 2012 to 2014, and the 100 breaststroke in 2013 and 2014.

== Texas A&M ==
She enrolled at Texas A&M in the Fall of 2014, and swam for the outstanding program provided by women's Head Coach Steve Bultman. Bultman was a two-time Olympic Coach, and an ASCAA Hall of Fame inductee. The A&M women's swim team during Galat's tenure had a third-place team finish at the NCAA championships in the 2018 season, and won the Southeastern Conference championship successively from 2016 to 2019.

At the 2016-2017 NCAA Championships, she was awarded first-team honors as an All-American in the 200 IM, placing 5th, and in the 400 IM, placing 4th. She also received an honorable mention in the 200 breaststroke, placing, ninth.

As a Senior at the 2018 NCAA Championships in Columbus, Ohio, she captured second place in the 200 breast, third in the 100 breast and fifth in the 200 IM at the Phillips 66 National Championships and World Trials.

== International competition ==
In international competition, in her Junior year, Galat became one of the first swimmers from A&M to capture a World Championships silver medal in the 200-meter breaststroke Short Course with a 2:21.77, at the 2017 FINA World Championships in Budapest. At those years World Championships, she placed second to Yuliya Yefimova of Russia who swam a 2:19.64. She won the silver medal again in the 200-meter breaststroke in Long Course as a College Senior at the 2018 FINA World Championships in Hangzhou.

At the 2019 Pan American Games in Lima, she won a silver medal in the 200-meter breaststroke.

== U.S. Olympic trials ==
At the late June 2016 U.S. Olympic Trials held in Omaha, Nebraska, Galat was 3rd in both the 400 IM with a 4:37.69 and the 200 breaststroke where she advanced to the finals with a 2:24.52. She placed 6th in the 200 IM with a time of 2:12.82.7.

Galat stayed highly competitive and participated in the 2021 Olympic Trials in Omaha, swimming a 1:05.75 in the 100-meter breaststroke placing fourth, and a 2:22.81 in the 200-meter breaststroke again placing fourth, but did not make the Women's U.S. Olympic team, requiring a first- or second-place finish. The trials and the Olympics that year were held a year late due to the COVID virus.

Galat retired from competition in September, 2021.
