= Reona Aoki =

Japanese swimmer (born 1995)

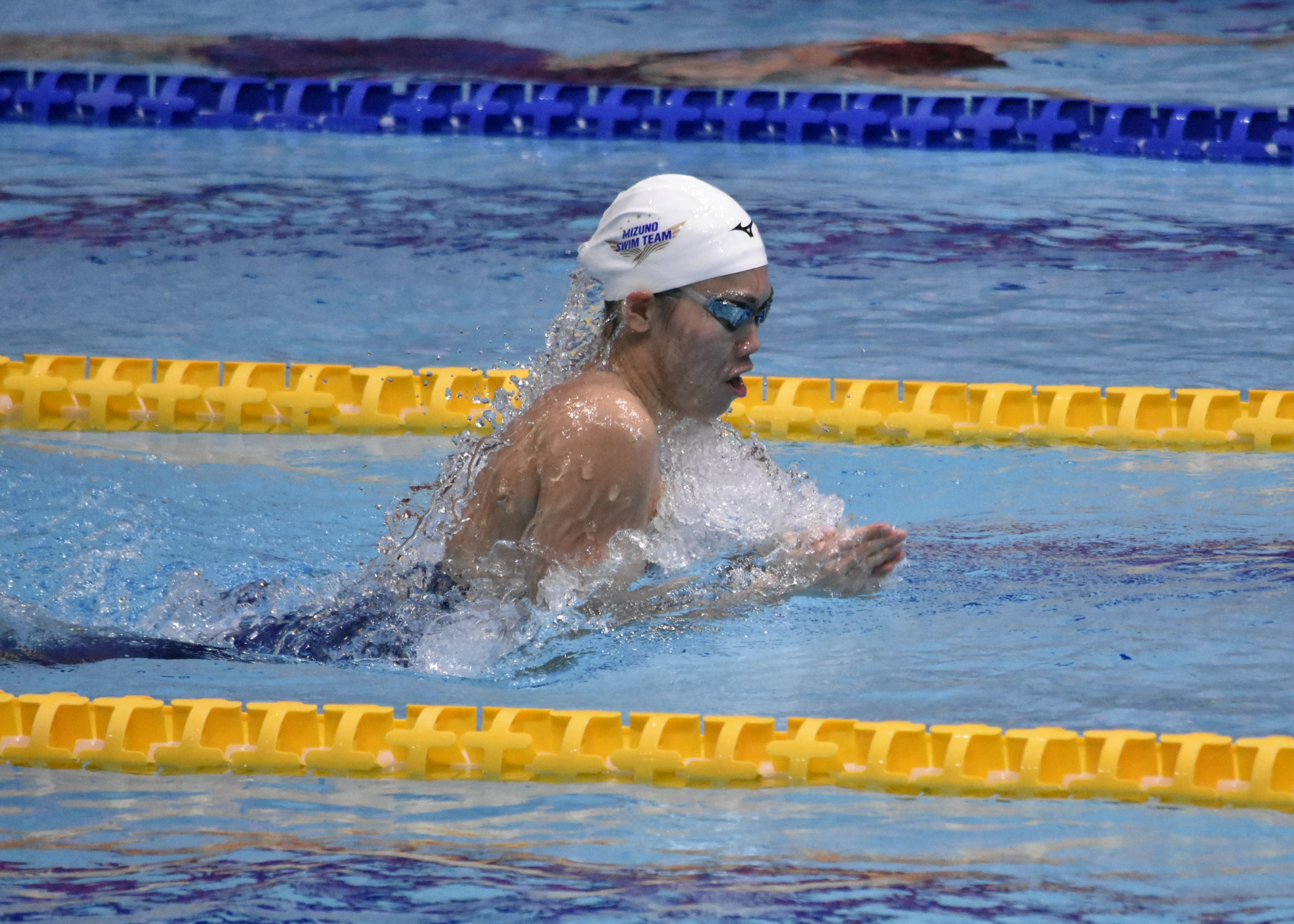
- Aoki in 2020

Personal information
- Born: 24 February 1995 (age 31) Tokyo, Japan

Sport
- Sport: Swimming
- Strokes: Breaststroke
Medal record
Representing Japan
Pan Pacific Championships
Bronze medal – third place	2018 Tokyo	100 m breaststroke
Bronze medal – third place	2018 Tokyo	4×100 m medley
Asian Games
Gold medal – first place	2018 Jakarta	4×100 m medley
Gold medal – first place	2022 Hangzhou	100 m breaststroke
Gold medal – first place	2022 Hangzhou	4×100 m medley
Silver medal – second place	2018 Jakarta	100 m breaststroke
Bronze medal – third place	2018 Jakarta	200 m breaststroke
Asian Championships
Gold medal – first place	2016 Tokyo	200 m breaststroke
Silver medal – second place	2016 Tokyo	100 m breaststroke
Universiade
Gold medal – first place	2017 Taipei	4×100 m medley
Silver medal – second place	2015 Gwangju	200 m breaststroke
Silver medal – second place	2017 Taipei	100 m breaststroke

Reona Aoki (青木 玲緒樹, Aoki Reona; born 24 February 1995) is a Japanese swimmer. She competed in the women's 100 metre breaststroke event at the 2017 World Aquatics Championships. She qualified to represent Japan at the 2020 Summer Olympics.
