= Yu Jingyao =

Chinese swimmer (born 1999)

Personal information
- Nationality: Chinese
- Born: 13 February 1999 (age 27) Beijing, China

Sport
- Sport: Swimming
Medal record
Women's swimming
Representing China
Asian Games
| Silver medal – second place | 2018 Jakarta | 200 m breaststroke |

Yu Jingyao (Chinese: 于静瑶; born 13 February 1999) is a Chinese swimmer. She competed in the women's 200 metre breaststroke event at the 2016 Summer Olympics.
