= Macarena Ceballos =

Argentine swimmer (born 1995)

Macarena Ailen Ceballos
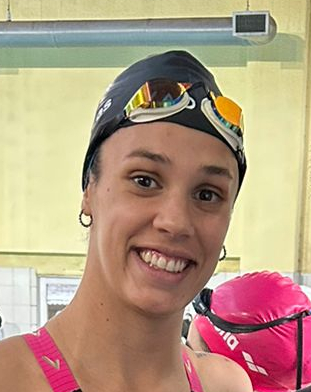

Personal information
- Born: 12 January 1995 (age 31) Río Cuarto, Córdoba, Argentina

Sport
- Sport: Swimming
Medal record
Representing Argentina
Women's swimming
Pan American Games
Bronze medal – third place	2023 Santiago	100 m breaststroke
South American Games
Gold medal – first place	2022 Asunción	100 m breaststroke
Silver medal – second place	2014 Santiago	100 m breaststroke
Silver medal – second place	2022 Asunción	200 m breaststroke
Silver medal – second place	2022 Asunción	4×100 m freestyle
Silver medal – second place	2022 Asunción	4×100 m medley
Bronze medal – third place	2022 Asunción	50 m breaststroke
Bronze medal – third place	2022 Asunción	100 m butterfly
Bronze medal – third place	2022 Asunción	4×100 m mixed medley

Macarena Ceballos (born 12 January 1995) is an Argentine swimmer. who specializes in breaststroke events. She achieved prominence at the 2013 Sudamericano Juvenil de Deportes Acuáticos and the 2014 South American Games. Throughout her career, she has represented Argentina at the Pan American Games, where she won a bronze medal in 2023, the World Aquatics Championships, and the 2024 Summer Olympics in Paris, where she finished 15th overall in the 100-meter breaststroke.

== Early life and career ==
Ceballos was born in Río Cuarto, Córdoba, on 12 January 1995. She began her athletic journey in gymnastics before transitioning to competitive swimming in 2003, later representing the Escuela de Natación Municipal de Río Cuarto during her student years.[. She won gold medals at the 2013 Sudamericano Juvenil de Deportes Acuáticos in both the 100-meter breaststroke (1:12.67) and the 200-meter breaststroke (2:34.38). In the relay events at the same championship, Ceballos joined the Argentine squad to a silver medal in the 4×100-meter medley relay alongside teammates Camila Biotti, Belén Díaz, and Rocío Corra, and secured another silver in the 4×100-meter freestyle relay with Josefina Lorda replacing Biotti.

She continued her competitive swimming at the 2014 South American Games, where she won the silver medal in the 100-meter breaststroke in 1:11.00 seconds, losing to Julia Sebastián, who set a time of 1:10.40 seconds, followed by Mercedes Toledo at 1:11.56 seconds, who took bronze. In the same year, she won a gold medal in the 100-meter breaststroke and Silver in the 50- and 200-meter breaststroke, which qualified her for the 2015 Pan American Games. At the Maria Lenk Trophy, she won a silver in the 200 m breaststroke and a bronze in the 100 m breaststroke, while Sebastian won both gold medals. In 2015, at the Santa Clara International Grand Prix, she won gold in the 4×100 medley with Virginia Bardach, Andrea Berrino and Aixa Triay. She competed in the women's 100 meter breaststroke event at the 2017 World Aquatics Championships.

In the 2023 Pan American Games, she won a bronze medal after losing to Rachel Nicol and Sophie Angus from Canada. She competed in the 2024 Summer Olympics and placed in 15th position.

== Award ==
She won the Jorge Newbery Gold Award in 2025 as one of the year's best Argentine athletes. She has already won this award multiple times since 2023.
