= Jessica Hansen =

Australian swimmer (born 1995)

Personal information
- Full name: Jessica Leigh Hansen
- Nationality: Australian
- Born: 30 June 1995 (age 30) Brisbane, Queensland, Australia
- Height: 171 cm (5 ft 7 in)
- Weight: 62 kg (137 lb)

Sport
- Sport: Swimming
- Strokes: Breaststroke
Medal record
Representing Australia
World Championships (LC)
Silver medal – second place	2019 Gwangju	4×100 m medley
Bronze medal – third place	2017 Budapest	4×100 m medley
World Championships (SC)
Bronze medal – third place	2016 Windsor	4×100 m medley
Bronze medal – third place	2018 Hangzhou	100 m breaststroke
Pan Pacific Championships
Gold medal – first place	2018 Tokyo	4×100 m medley
Silver medal – second place	2018 Tokyo	100 m breaststroke

Jessica Leigh Hansen (born 30 June 1995) is an Australian swimmer. She competed in the women's 100 metre breaststroke event at the 2017 World Aquatics Championships. Hansen attended Carey Baptist Grammar School. She completed a Bachelor of Exercise Sport Science/Business (Sports Management) degree at Deakin University.
