= Julia Sebastián =

Argentine swimmer (born 1993)

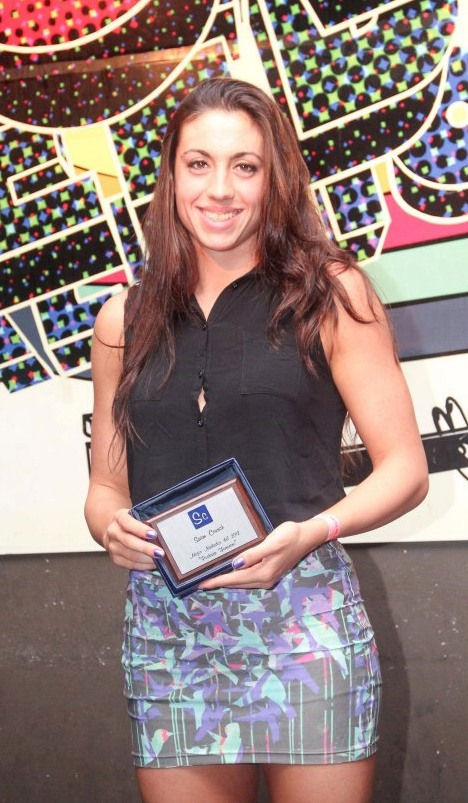
- Sebastián in 2013

Personal information
- Born: 23 November 1993 (age 32) Santa Fe, Argentina
- Height: 1.78 m (5 ft 10 in)
- Weight: 70 kg (154 lb)

Sport
- Sport: Swimming
Medal record
Representing Argentina
Pan American Games
Silver medal – second place	2019 Lima	100 m breaststroke
Bronze medal – third place	2019 Lima	200 m breaststroke
Bronze medal – third place	2019 Lima	4×100 m mixed medley
South American Championships
Gold medal – first place	2012 Belém	200 m breaststroke
Gold medal – first place	2014 Mar del Plata	50 m breaststroke
Gold medal – first place	2014 Mar del Plata	200 m breaststroke
Gold medal – first place	2016 Asunción	200 m breaststroke
Gold medal – first place	2018 Trujillo	200 m breaststroke
Gold medal – first place	2021 Buenos Aires	100 m breaststroke
Gold medal – first place	2021 Buenos Aires	200 m breaststroke
Gold medal – first place	2021 Buenos Aires	4×100 m medley
Silver medal – second place	2012 Belém	100 m breaststroke
Silver medal – second place	2014 Mar del Plata	100 m breaststroke
Silver medal – second place	2014 Mar del Plata	4×100 m medley
Silver medal – second place	2014 Mar del Plata	4×100 m mixed medley
Silver medal – second place	2016 Asunción	50 m breaststroke
Silver medal – second place	2016 Asunción	100 m breaststroke
Silver medal – second place	2018 Trujillo	50 m breaststroke
Silver medal – second place	2018 Trujillo	100 m breaststroke
Silver medal – second place	2021 Buenos Aires	50 m breaststroke
Silver medal – second place	2021 Buenos Aires	4×100 m mixed medley
Bronze medal – third place	2012 Belém	50 m breaststroke
South American Games
Gold medal – first place	2014 Santiago	100 m breaststroke
Silver medal – second place	2014 Santiago	4×100 m medley

Julia Sebastián (born 23 November 1993) is an Argentine breaststroke swimmer. She represented Argentina at the 2020 Summer Olympics in the women's 100 metre breaststroke event and the women's 200 metre breaststroke event.

== Career ==
She won a gold and a silver medal at the 2014 South American Games. As of 2014 she holds national records in all 50–200 m events. She competed at the 2019 Maria Lenk Trophy in Brazil, setting a South American record, in 200-meter breaststroke .
