= 2018 FINA World Swimming Championships (25 m) – Women's 4 × 50 metre medley relay =

Women's 4 × 50 metre medley relay at the 2018 FINA World Swimming Championships (25 m)
- Venue: Hangzhou Sports Park Stadium
- Dates: 12 December (heats and final)
- Competitors: 71 from 16 nations
- Teams: 16
- Winning time: 1:42.38 WR

Medalists
| gold medal | Olivia Smoliga; Katie Meili; Kelsi Dahlia; Mallory Comerford; Kathleen Baker; Kendyl Stewart; Erika Brown | United States |
| silver medal | Fu Yuanhui; Suo Ran; Wang Yichun; Wu Yue | China |
| bronze medal | Maaike de Waard; Kim Busch; Ranomi Kromowidjojo; Femke Heemskerk | Netherlands |

The women's 4 × 50 metre medley relay competition of the 2018 FINA World Swimming Championships (25 m) was held on 12 December 2018.

== Records ==
Prior to the competition, the existing world and championship records were as follows.

| | Nation | Time | Location | Date |
|---|---|---|---|---|
| World record | United States | 1:43.27 | Windsor, Canada | 7 December 2016 |
| Championship record | United States | 1:43.27 | Windsor, Canada | 7 December 2016 |

== Results ==
=== Heats ===
The heats were started at 09:30.

| Rank | Heat | Lane | Nation | Swimmers | Time | Notes |
|---|---|---|---|---|---|---|
| 1 | 2 | 2 | United States | Kathleen Baker (26.89); Katie Meili (29.26); Kendyl Stewart (25.22); Erika Brown (23.55) | 1:44.92 | Q |
| 2 | 1 | 5 | China | Fu Yuanhui (26.66); Suo Ran (30.31); Wang Yichun (25.10); Wu Yue (23.46) | 1:45.53 | Q |
| 3 | 2 | 8 | Japan | Miyuki Takemura (26.39); Miho Teramura (30.10); Ai Soma (25.51); Aya Sato (24.02) | 1:46.02 | Q |
| 4 | 1 | 6 | Czech Republic | Simona Kubová (26.59); Petra Chocová (30.15); Lucie Svěcená (25.79); Anika Apostalon (23.78) | 1:46.31 | Q |
| 5 | 2 | 4 | Netherlands | Maaike de Waard (26.84); Kim Busch (30.76); Ranomi Kromowidjojo (25.13); Femke Heemskerk (24.26) | 1:46.99 | Q |
| 6 | 2 | 3 | Australia | Minna Atherton (26.92); Jessica Hansen (30.17); Holly Barratt (25.84); Carla Buchanan (24.56) | 1:47.49 | Q |
| 7 | 2 | 5 | Russia | Anastasia Fesikova (27.30); Maria Temnikova (30.39); Arina Surkova (25.47); Daria Kartashova (24.57) | 1:47.73 | Q |
| 8 | 1 | 4 | Italy | Elena Di Liddo (27.08); Arianna Castiglioni (29.80); Ilaria Bianchi (26.14); Margherita Panziera (24.79) | 1:47.81 | Q |
| 9 | 2 | 7 | Germany | Laura Riedemann (27.22); Jessica Steiger (30.53); Aliena Schmidtke (25.65); Marie Pietruschka (24.72) | 1:48.12 | |
| 10 | 2 | 1 | Canada | Ingrid Wilm (27.72); Sophie Angus (30.50); Haley Black (25.14); Aela Janvier (26.20) | 1:49.56 | |
| 11 | 1 | 1 | Switzerland | Seraina Sturzenegger (27.97); Lisa Mamie (30.85); Svenja Stoffel (26.33); Alexandra Touretski (24.58) | 1:49.73 | |
| 12 | 1 | 7 | Slovakia | Karolina Hájková (27.63); Andrea Podmaníková (30.76); Tamara Potocká (26.81); Sabína Kupčová (26.04) | 1:51.24 | |
| 13 | 2 | 6 | Turkey | Ekaterina Avramova (28.00); Viktoriya Zeynep Güneş (31.25); Aleyna Özkan (27.00); Selen Özbilen (25.00) | 1:51.25 | |
| 14 | 1 | 3 | Hong Kong | Stephanie Au (27.86); Lam Hoi Kiu (31.94); Chan Kin Lok (27.70); Sze Hang Yu (24.49) | 1:51.99 | |
| 15 | 1 | 2 | New Zealand | Emma Godwin (28.06); Ciara Smith (31.96); Vanessa Ouwehand (27.37); Rebecca Moynihan (25.06) | 1:52.45 | |
| 16 | 1 | 8 | Chinese Taipei | Wang Wan-chen (30.19); Lin Pei-wun (31.84); Huang Mei-chien (26.98); Chen Szu-an (26.89) | 1:55.90 | |

=== Final ===
The final was held at 19:00.

| Rank | Lane | Nation | Swimmers | Time | Notes |
|---|---|---|---|---|---|
| 1st place, gold medalist(s) | 4 | United States | Olivia Smoliga (25.97); Katie Meili (29.29); Kelsi Dahlia (24.02); Mallory Comerford (23.10) | 1:42.38 | WR |
| 2nd place, silver medalist(s) | 5 | China | Fu Yuanhui (26.20); Suo Ran (29.63); Wang Yichun (24.84); Wu Yue (23.64) | 1:44.31 | |
| 3rd place, bronze medalist(s) | 2 | Netherlands | Maaike de Waard (26.46); Kim Busch (30.73); Ranomi Kromowidjojo (24.21); Femke Heemskerk (23.17) | 1:44.57 | |
| 4 | 3 | Japan | Miyuki Takemura (26.14); Miho Teramura (29.50); Ai Soma (25.28); Aya Sato (23.98) | 1:44.90 | |
| 5 | 7 | Australia | Minna Atherton (26.44); Jessica Hansen (29.70); Emily Seebohm (25.68); Holly Barratt (23.97) | 1:45.79 | |
| 6 | 1 | Russia | Maria Kameneva (26.51); Maria Temnikova (30.31); Arina Surkova (25.23); Rozaliya Nasretdinova (23.93) | 1:45.98 | |
| 7 | 6 | Czech Republic | Simona Kubová (26.58); Petra Chocová (29.90); Lucie Svěcená (25.86); Anika Apostalon (23.83) | 1:46.17 | |
| 8 | 8 | Italy | Carlotta Zofkova (27.38); Arianna Castiglioni (29.48); Elena Di Liddo (25.10); Margherita Panziera (24.48) | 1:46.44 | |
