= 2016 FINA World Swimming Championships (25 m) – Women's 4 × 100 metre freestyle relay =

Women's 4 × 100 metre freestyle relay at the 2016 FINA World Swimming Championships (25 m)
- Venue: WFCU Centre
- Dates: 6 December (heats and final)
- Competitors: 44 from 11 nations
- Teams: 11
- Winning time: 3:28.82

Medalists
gold medal	Amanda Weir; Kelsi Worrell; Madison Kennedy; Mallory Comerford; Ali DeLoof; Katie Drabot; Katrina Konopka	United States
silver medal	Erika Ferraioli; Silvia Di Pietro; Aglaia Pezzato; Federica Pellegrini	Italy
bronze medal	Maud van der Meer; Marrit Steenbergen; Maaike de Waard; Ranomi Kromowidjojo; Kim Busch; Robin Neumann	Netherlands

The Women's 4 × 100 metre freestyle relay competition of the 2016 FINA World Swimming Championships (25 m) was held on 6 December 2016.

== Records ==
Prior to the competition, the existing world and championship records were as follows.

	Nation	Time	Location	Date
World record Championship record	Netherlands	3:26.53	Doha	5 December 2014

=== Heats ===
The heats were held at 13:26.

Rank	Heat	Lane	Nation	Swimmers	Time	Notes
1	2	4	Canada	Sandrine Mainville (52.72); Alexia Zevnik (52.12); Michelle Williams (52.02); Taylor Ruck (52.63)	3:29.49	Q, NR
2	2	3	Italy	Erika Ferraioli (53.55); Silvia Di Pietro (52.61); Aglaia Pezzato (53.22); Federica Pellegrini (53.03)	3:32.41	Q
3	2	5	Netherlands	Maud van der Meer (53.75); Kim Busch (53.52); Robin Neumann (54.42); Ranomi Kromowidjojo (51.90)	3:33.59	Q
4	2	7	Australia	Carla Buchanan (53.89); Jemma Schlicht (54.37); Emily Seebohm (52.77); Brittany Elmslie (52.62)	3:33.65	Q
5	1	6	China	Zhu Menghui (53.21); Shen Duo (53.65); Sun Meichen (53.57); Tang Yuting (54.06)	3:34.49	Q
6	1	7	France	Anna Santamans (53.49); Marie Wattel (53.82); Mathilde Cini (54.47); Melanie Henique (53.06)	3:34.84	Q, NR
7	1	3	United States	Katrina Konopka (53.69); Katie Drabot (54.61); Madison Kennedy (53.24); Ali DeLoof (53.44)	3:34.98	Q
8	1	4	Japan	Rikako Ikee (52.69); Yui Yamane (53.79); Tomomi Aoki (53.45); Sayuki Ouchi (55.11)	3:35.04	Q
9	2	6	Denmark	Mie Nielsen (54.20); Julie Kepp Jensen (53.78); Sarah Bro (54.88); Emilie Beckmann (54.49)	3:37.35	
10	1	5	Paraguay	Karen Riveros (57.28); Sofia Lopez (59.59); Nicole Rautemberg (1:00.08); Marie Jose Arrua (58.58)	3:55.97	NR
11	1	2	Macau	Tan Chi Yan (57.94); Lei On Kei (58.92); Choi Weng Tong (1:00.01); Long Chi Wai (59.10)	3:55.97	
	2	2	Algeria			DNS

=== Final ===
The final was held at 20:12.

Rank	Lane	Nation	Swimmers	Time	Notes
1st place, gold medalist(s)	1	United States	Amanda Weir (52.95); Kelsi Worrell (51.04); Madison Kennedy (52.84); Mallory Comerford (51.99)	3:28.82	
2nd place, silver medalist(s)	5	Italy	Erika Ferraioli (53.51); Silvia Di Pietro (52.06); Aglaia Pezzato (52.52); Federica Pellegrini (52.19)	3:30.28	
3rd place, bronze medalist(s)	3	Netherlands	Maud van der Meer (53.48); Marrit Steenbergen (53.17); Maaike de Waard (53.09); Ranomi Kromowidjojo (51.36)	3:31.10	
4	6	Australia	Brittany Elmslie (52.29); Carla Buchanan (53.17); Jemma Schlicht (53.75); Emily Seebohm (52.00)	3:31.21	
5	8	Japan	Rikako Ikee (52.16); Yui Yamane (53.91); Sayuki Ouchi (54.21); Tomomi Aoki (53.81)	3:34.09	
6	7	France	Anna Santamans (53.79); Marie Wattel (53.52); Mathilde Cini (54.06); Melanie Henique (53.76)	3:35.13	
7	2	China	Zhu Menghui (53.77); Shen Duo (54.01); Sun Meichen (53.82); Tang Yuting (54.41)	3:36.01	
	4	Canada	Sandrine Mainville; Alexia Zevnik; Penny Oleksiak; Michelle Williams		DSQ
