= 2018 FINA World Swimming Championships (25 m) – Women's 4 × 100 metre medley relay =

Women's 4 × 100 metre medley relay at the 2018 FINA World Swimming Championships (25 m)
- Venue: Hangzhou Sports Park Stadium
- Dates: 16 December (heats and final)
- Competitors: 73 from 15 nations
- Teams: 15
- Winning time: 3:45.58

Medalists
gold medal	Olivia Smoliga; Katie Meili; Kelsi Dahlia; Mallory Comerford; Kathleen Baker; Kendyl Stewart; Melanie Margalis; Lia Neal	United States
silver medal	Fu Yuanhui; Shi Jinglin; Zhang Yufei; Zhu Menghui; Wang Yichun; Yang Junxuan	China
bronze medal	Margherita Panziera; Martina Carraro; Elena Di Liddo; Federica Pellegrini; Ilaria Bianchi	Italy

The women's 4 × 100 metre medley relay competition of the 2018 FINA World Swimming Championships (25 m) was held on 16 December 2018.

== Records ==
Prior to the competition, the existing world and championship records were as follows.

	Nation	Time	Location	Date
World record	United States	3:45.20	Indianapolis, United States	11 December 2015
Championship record	United States	3:47.89	Windsor, Canada	11 December 2016

== Results ==
=== Heats ===
The heats were started at 10:20.

Rank	Heat	Lane	Nation	Swimmers	Time	Notes
1	2	5	United States	Kathleen Baker (56.96); Melanie Margalis (1:04.85); Kendyl Stewart (56.29); Lia Neal (52.63)	3:50.73	Q
2	2	4	China	Fu Yuanhui (57.71); Shi Jinglin (1:05.07); Wang Yichun (56.26); Yang Junxuan (52.54)	3:51.58	Q
3	1	4	Australia	Minna Atherton (57.38); Jessica Hansen (1:05.28); Emily Seebohm (57.51); Ariarne Titmus (52.92)	3:53.09	Q
4	1	3	Italy	Margherita Panziera (57.63); Martina Carraro (1:05.32); Ilaria Bianchi (57.78); Federica Pellegrini (53.16)	3:53.89	Q
5	2	3	Japan	Emi Moronuki (57.44); Kanako Watanabe (1:06.52); Yukina Hirayama (57.81); Tomomi Aoki (53.31)	3:55.08	Q
6	1	5	Russia	Daria Ustinova (58.27); Vitalina Simonova (1:05.46); Daria Kartashova (57.61); Veronika Andrusenko (53.77)	3:55.11	Q
7	1	1	Germany	Laura Riedemann (58.40); Jessica Steiger (1:06.46); Aliena Schmidtke (58.52); Marie Pietruschka (53.92)	3:57.30	Q
8	2	2	Canada	Ingrid Wilm (58.55); Sophie Angus (1:06.46); Haley Black (56.49); Aela Janvier (55.97)	3:57.47	Q
9	1	6	Turkey	Ekaterina Avramova (59.88); Viktoriya Zeynep Güneş (1:07.59); Nida Eliz Üstündağ (58.35); Selen Özbilen (54.66)	4:00.48	
10	2	8	Switzerland	Seraina Sturzenegger (1:00.93); Lisa Mamie (1:06.79); Svenja Stoffel (58.47); Alexandra Touretski (54.47)	4:00.66	
11	2	7	Slovakia	Karolina Hájková (59.76); Andrea Podmaníková (1:07.54); Tamara Potocká (59.67); Barbora Mikuskova (55.39)	4:02.36	
12	2	1	Austria	Caroline Pilhatsch (59.49); Cornelia Pammer (1:07.84); Lena Kreundl (1:00.21); Marlene Kahler (55.29)	4:02.83	
13	1	2	New Zealand	Emma Godwin (59.22); Ciara Smith (1:09.14); Vanessa Ouwehand (1:01.82); Paige Flynn (54.20)	4:04.38	
14	2	6	Hong Kong	Wong Toto Kwan To (1:00.09); Kan Cheuk Tung Natalie (1:10.17); Chan Kin Lok (1:00.70); Sze Hang Yu (55.07)	4:06.03	
15	1	7	Chinese Taipei	Chen Szu-an (1:03.67); Lin Pei-wun (1:10.85); Huang Mei-chien (1:02.93); Wang Wan-chen (58.32)	4:15.77	

=== Final ===
The final was held at 20:00.

Rank	Lane	Nation	Swimmers	Time	Notes
1st place, gold medalist(s)	4	United States	Olivia Smoliga (55.86); Katie Meili (1:03.52); Kelsi Dahlia (54.89); Mallory Comerford (51.31)	3:45.58	CR
2nd place, silver medalist(s)	5	China	Fu Yuanhui (56.86); Shi Jinglin (1:03.97); Zhang Yufei (56.21); Zhu Menghui (51.76)	3:48.80	
3rd place, bronze medalist(s)	6	Italy	Margherita Panziera (58.39); Martina Carraro (1:04.47); Elena Di Liddo (56.41); Federica Pellegrini (52.11)	3:51.38	
4	2	Japan	Emi Moronuki (57.32); Kanako Watanabe (1:05.58); Ai Soma (56.27); Tomomi Aoki (52.64)	3:51.81	
5	7	Russia	Anastasia Fesikova (57.73); Maria Temnikova (1:06.53); Svetlana Chimrova (56.90); Maria Kameneva (52.57)	3:53.73	
6	1	Germany	Laura Riedemann (58.04); Jessica Steiger (1:05.80); Aliena Schmidtke (57.41); Annika Bruhn (52.90)	3:54.15	
7	8	Canada	Ingrid Wilm (58.63); Sophie Angus (1:06.23); Haley Black (57.08); Aela Janvier (56.10)	3:58.04	
	3	Australia	Minna Atherton (56.91); Jessica Hansen (1:04.08); Emily Seebohm; Ariarne Titmus	DSQ	
