= 2018 FINA World Swimming Championships (25 m) – Women's 4 × 50 metre freestyle relay =

Women's 4 × 50 metre freestyle relay at the 2018 FINA World Swimming Championships (25 m)
- Venue: Hangzhou Sports Park Stadium
- Dates: 16 December (heats and final)
- Competitors: 60 from 13 nations
- Teams: 13
- Winning time: 1:34.03

Medalists
gold medal	Madison Kennedy; Mallory Comerford; Kelsi Dahlia; Erika Brown; Lia Neal; Olivia Smoliga; Veronica Burchill	United States
silver medal	Ranomi Kromowidjojo; Femke Heemskerk; Kim Busch; Valerie van Roon; Maaike de Waard	Netherlands
bronze medal	Holly Barratt; Emily Seebohm; Minna Atherton; Carla Buchanan; Ariarne Titmus	Australia

The women's 4 × 50 metre freestyle relay competition of the 2018 FINA World Swimming Championships (25 m) was held on 16 December 2018.

== Records ==
Prior to the competition, the existing world and championship records were as follows.

	Nation	Time	Location	Date
World record	Netherlands	1:33.91	Copenhagen, Denmark	15 December 2017
Championship record	Netherlands	1:34.24	Doha, Qatar	7 December 2014

== Results ==
=== Heats ===
The heats were started at 9:30.

Rank	Heat	Lane	Nation	Swimmers	Time	Notes
1	2	4	Netherlands	Femke Heemskerk (23.93); Kim Busch (24.21); Valerie van Roon (24.20); Maaike de Waard (23.99)	1:36.33	Q
2	1	1	United States	Lia Neal (24.45); Olivia Smoliga (23.99); Veronica Burchill (24.44); Erika Brown (23.77)	1:36.65	Q
3	1	5	Australia	Holly Barratt (23.97); Ariarne Titmus (24.71); Minna Atherton (24.61); Carla Buchanan (24.58)	1:37.87	Q
4	1	4	Russia	Rozaliya Nasretdinova (24.84); Arina Surkova (24.18); Daria Kartashova (24.43); Veronika Andrusenko (24.81)	1:38.26	Q
5	2	7	Japan	Aya Sato (24.70); Tomomi Aoki (24.75); Emi Moronuki (24.89); Rika Omoto (24.13)	1:38.47	Q
6	2	5	China	Liu Xiang (24.64); Wu Yue (24.21); Liu Xiaohan (24.72); Wang Jingzhuo (25.16)	1:38.73	Q
7	2	6	Czech Republic	Simona Kubová (25.23); Anika Apostalon (24.28); Barbora Seemanová (24.18); Barbora Závadová (25.35)	1:39.04	Q
8	1	6	Germany	Jessica Steiger (24.84); Marie Pietruschka (24.86); Annika Bruhn (24.84); Reva Foos (24.89)	1:39.43	Q
9	2	3	Hong Kong	Kan Cheuk Tung Natalie (25.28); Sze Hang Yu (24.87); Stephanie Au (24.77); Chan Kin Lok (25.34)	1:40.26	
10	1	7	New Zealand	Paige Flynn (25.28); Rebecca Moynihan (24.84); Emma Godwin (24.99); Vanessa Ouwehand (26.17)	1:41.28	
11	2	2	Slovakia	Barbora Mikuskova (25.76); Laura Benková (25.87); Tamara Potocká (25.20); Karolina Hájková (25.27)	1:42.10	
12	1	3	Turkey	Selen Özbilen (25.38); Aleyna Özkan (26.43); Roza Erdemli (26.28); Ekaterina Avramova (25.00)	1:43.09	
13	1	2	Chinese Taipei	Huang Mei-chien (25.77); Chen Szu-an (26.56); Wang Wan-chen (26.48); Lin Pei-wun (26.45)	1:45.26	
	2	1	Brazil		DNS	

=== Final ===
The final was held at 18:00.

Rank	Lane	Nation	Swimmers	Time	Notes
1st place, gold medalist(s)	5	United States	Madison Kennedy (24.05); Mallory Comerford (23.28); Kelsi Dahlia (23.37); Erika Brown (23.33)	1:34.03	CR
2nd place, silver medalist(s)	4	Netherlands	Ranomi Kromowidjojo (23.60); Femke Heemskerk (23.32); Kim Busch (23.84); Valerie van Roon (23.79)	1:34.55	
3rd place, bronze medalist(s)	3	Australia	Holly Barratt (24.04); Emily Seebohm (24.10); Minna Atherton (24.02); Carla Buchanan (24.18)	1:36.34	
4	6	Russia	Maria Kameneva (24.37); Arina Surkova (24.06); Daria Kartashova (24.53); Rozaliya Nasretdinova (24.13)	1:37.09	
5	2	Japan	Aya Sato (24.46); Runa Imai (24.27); Rika Omoto (24.07); Tomomi Aoki (24.55)	1:37.35	
6	7	China	Liu Xiang (24.59); Wu Yue (23.97); Yang Junxuan (24.32); Liu Xiaohan (24.70)	1:37.58	
7	1	Czech Republic	Simona Kubová (25.06); Anika Apostalon (23.91); Barbora Seemanová (23.90); Barbora Závadová (25.37)	1:38.24	
8	8	Germany	Jessica Steiger (24.63); Marie Pietruschka (24.73); Annika Bruhn (24.55); Reva Foos (24.79)	1:38.70	
