= 2016 FINA World Swimming Championships (25 m) – Women's 4 × 100 metre medley relay =

Women's 4 × 100 metre medley relay at the 2016 FINA World Swimming Championships (25 m)
- Venue: WFCU Centre
- Dates: 11 December (heats and final)
- Competitors: 68 from 17 nations
- Teams: 17
- Winning time: 3:47.89

Medalists
gold medal	Ali DeLoof; Lilly King; Kelsi Worrell; Mallory Comerford; Hellen Moffitt; Molly Hannis; Sarah Gibson; Amanda Weir	United States
silver medal	Kylie Masse; Rachel Nicol; Katerine Savard; Penny Oleksiak; Hilary Caldwell; Taylor Ruck	Canada
bronze medal	Emily Seebohm; Jessica Hansen; Emily Washer; Brittany Elmslie	Australia

The Women's 4 × 100 metre medley relay competition of the 2016 FINA World Swimming Championships (25 m) was held on 11 December 2016.

== Records ==
Prior to the competition, the existing world and championship records were as follows.

	Nation	Time	Location	Date
World record	United States	3:45.20	Indianapolis	11 December 2015
Championship record	China	3:48.29	Dubai	17 December 2010

== Results ==
=== Heats ===
The heats were held at 10:34.

Rank	Heat	Lane	Nation	Swimmers	Time	Notes
1	3	5	United States	Hellen Moffitt (58.32); Molly Hannis (1:03.54); Sarah Gibson (57.81); Amanda Weir (53.18)	3:52.85	Q
2	2	5	Japan	Emi Moronuki (58.22); Miho Teramura (1:03.88); Rikako Ikee (56.74); Tomomi Aoki (54.13)	3:52.97	Q
3	2	3	Australia	Emily Seebohm (56.97); Jessica Hansen (1:05.31); Emily Washer (57.58); Brittany Elmslie (53.12)	3:52.98	Q
4	2	8	Canada	Hilary Caldwell (57.84); Rachel Nicol (1:05.94); Katerine Savard (56.90); Taylor Ruck (53.00)	3:53.68	Q
5	3	7	Italy	Silvia Scalia (58.50); Martina Carraro (1:05.66); Silvia Di Pietro (57.18); Federica Pellegrini (53.26)	3:54.60	Q
6	2	7	Russia	Mariia Kameneva (58.37); Natalia Ivaneeva (1:05.10); Veronika Popova (58.04); Rozaliya Nasretdinova (54.14)	3:55.65	Q
7	3	4	China	Chen Jie (57.39); Shi Jinglin (1:07.33); Zhang Yufei (57.41); Zhu Menghui (54.08)	3:56.21	Q
8	3	6	Great Britain	Georgia Davies (56.86); Molly Renshaw (1:06.13); Laura Stephens (58.62); Kathleen Dawson (55.03)	3:56.64	Q
9	3	8	Czech Republic	Simona Baumrtová (57.77); Martina Moravčíková (1:07.32); Lucie Svěcená (58.13); Barbora Seemanová (53.64)	3:56.86	
10	3	3	Sweden	Hanna Rosvall (1:00.12); Jessica Eriksson (1:05.73); Sara Junevik (58.78); Nathalie Lindborg (54.71)	3:59.34	
11	3	2	Iceland	Eygló Gústafsdóttir (58.14); Hrafnhildur Lúthersdóttir (1:06.20); Bryndis Hansen (59.71); Johanna Gústafsdóttir (56.03)	4:00.08	
12	2	2	Finland	Jenna Laukkanen (59.92); Silja Kansakoski (1:05.84); Emilia Bottas (1:00.63); Hanna-Maria Seppälä (53.82)	4:00.21	
13	2	6	France	Mathilde Cini (1:00.01); Solene Gallego (1:08.23); Marie Wattel (58.78); Mélanie Henique (55.17)	4:02.19	
14	2	4	Hong Kong	Wong Toto Kwan To (1:00.07); Yeung Jamie Zhen Mei (1:08.32); Chan Kin Lok (1:01.94); Sze Hang Yu (54.28)	4:04.61	
15	2	1	Singapore	Hoong En Qi (1:05.22); Samantha Yeo (1:08.60); Marina Chan (1:02.05); Amanda Lim (56.48)	4:12.35	
16	1	4	Algeria	Amel Melih (1:01.95 NR); Hannah Taleb-Bendiab (1:11.23); Hamida Nefsi (1:04.44); Souad Cherouati (1:01.11)	4:18.73	
	1	5	South Africa			DNS
	2	0	Venezuela			DNS
	3	0	Austria			DNS
	3	1	Paraguay			DNS
	1	3	Denmark	Mie Nielsen (57.68); Matilde Schroder (1:07.10); Emilie Beckmann; Signe Bro		DSQ

=== Final ===
The final was held at 20:29.

Rank	Lane	Nation	Swimmers	Time	Notes
1st place, gold medalist(s)	4	United States	Ali DeLoof (56.68); Lilly King (1:03.71); Kelsi Worrell (55.48); Mallory Comerford (52.02)	3:47.89	CR
2nd place, silver medalist(s)	6	Canada	Kylie Masse (56.29); Rachel Nicol (1:05.13); Katerine Savard (56.38); Penny Oleksiak (51.07)	3:48.87	
3rd place, bronze medalist(s)	3	Australia	Emily Seebohm (56.18); Jessica Hansen (1:04.83); Emily Washer (56.90); Brittany Elmslie (51.75)	3:49.66	
4	5	Japan	Emi Moronuki (58.25); Miho Teramura (1:03.56); Rikako Ikee (55.43); Tomomi Aoki (53.04)	3:50.28	
5	1	China	Chen Jie (57.63); Shi Jinglin (1:04.69); Zhang Yufei (56.39); Zhu Menghui (52.30)	3:51.01	
6	7	Russia	Mariia Kameneva (57.66); Natalia Ivaneeva (1:05.07); Svetlana Chimrova (57.47); Veronika Popova (52.75)	3:52.95	
7	2	Italy	Silvia Scalia (58.82); Martina Carraro (1:05.43); Silvia Di Pietro (56.38); Federica Pellegrini (52.95)	3:53.58	
8	8	Great Britain	Georgia Davies (56.83); Chloe Tutton (1:04.72); Laura Stephens (58.67); Georgia Coates (54.32)	3:54.54	
