= Swimming at the 2019 World Aquatics Championships – Women's 4 × 100 metre freestyle relay =

Women's 4 × 100 metre freestyle relay at the 2019 World Aquatics Championships
- Venue: Nambu University Municipal Aquatics Center
- Location: Gwangju, South Korea
- Dates: 21 July (heats and final)
- Competitors: 82 from 19 nations
- Teams: 19
- Winning time: 3:30.21

Medalists
gold medal	Bronte Campbell; Brianna Throssell; Emma McKeon; Cate Campbell; Madison Wilson	Australia
silver medal	Mallory Comerford; Abbey Weitzeil; Kelsi Dahlia; Simone Manuel; Allison Schmitt; Margo Geer; Lia Neal	United States
bronze medal	Kayla Sanchez; Taylor Ruck; Penny Oleksiak; Maggie MacNeil; Rebecca Smith	Canada

The Women's 4 × 100 metre freestyle relay competition at the 2019 World Championships was held on 21 July 2019.

== Records ==
Prior to the competition, the existing world and championship records were as follows.

World record	Australia	3:30.05	Gold Coast, Australia	5 April 2018
Competition record	Australia	3:31.48	Kazan, Russia	2 August 2015

The following new records were set during this competition.

Date	Event	Nation	Time	Record
21 July	Final	Australia	3:30.21	CR

== Results ==
=== Heats ===
The heats were held at 12:21.

Rank	Heat	Lane	Nation	Swimmers	Time	Notes
1	2	4	Australia	Cate Campbell (52.44); Brianna Throssell (53.66); Madison Wilson (53.90); Bronte Campbell (53.39)	3:33.39	Q
2	2	5	Canada	Kayla Sanchez (53.61); Penny Oleksiak (52.75); Rebecca Smith (54.37); Maggie MacNeil (54.00)	3:34.73	Q
3	2	1	Sweden	Michelle Coleman (54.33); Sarah Sjöström (51.91); Hanna Eriksson (55.70); Louise Hansson (54.09)	3:36.03	Q
4	1	4	United States	Allison Schmitt (55.04); Abbey Weitzeil (53.07); Margo Geer (53.61); Lia Neal (54.41)	3:36.13	Q
5	2	3	Japan	Rika Omoto (54.21); Tomomi Aoki (54.01); Aya Sato (53.98 ) Rio Shirai (53.97)	3:36.17	Q, NR
6	1	5	Netherlands	Kim Busch (55.39); Femke Heemskerk (52.60); Kira Toussaint (54.32); Ranomi Kromowidjojo (54.31)	3:36.62	Q
7	1	3	China	Zhu Menghui (54.56); Wu Qingfeng (54.99); Wang Jingzhuo (54.76); Yang Junxuan (53.58)	3:37.89	Q
8	1	2	Germany	Annika Bruhn (55.35); Reva Foos (54.85); Julia Mrozinski (54.28); Jessica Steiger (54.07)	3:38.55	Q
9	1	6	Russia	Daria S. Ustinova (54.55); Maria Kameneva (53.99); Sofya Lobova (55.55); Arina Openysheva (54.85)	3:38.94	
10	1	7	Hong Kong	Camille Cheng (55.23); Siobhán Haughey (52.89); Ho Nam Wai (56.64); Tam Hoi Lam (55.64)	3:40.40	
11	1	0	Czech Republic	Barbora Seemanová (55.09); Anna Kolářová (55.93); Simona Kubová (55.50); Anika Apostalon (54.26)	3:40.78	NR
12	2	7	Poland	Katarzyna Wilk (55.03); Alicja Tchórz (55.00); Dominika Kossakowska (55.80); Aleksandra Polańska (55.18)	3:41.01	
13	2	2	Switzerland	Nina Kost (56.03); Alexandra Touretski (55.95); Maria Ugolkova (54.22); Noémi Girardet (55.10)	3:41.30	
14	2	6	Denmark	Julie Kepp Jensen (55.45); Signe Bro (55.97); Jeanette Ottesen (54.85); Emily Gantriis (55.93)	3:42.20	
15	2	0	South Korea	Lee Kun-a (55.80); Jeong So-eun (55.22); Choi Ji-won (55.97); Jung You-in (55.59)	3:42.58	NR
16	2	8	Turkey	Selen Özbilen (55.30); Gizem Güvenç (55.63); Viktoriya Zeynep Güneş (55.89); Ekaterina Avramova (56.21)	3:43.03	NR
17	1	1	Singapore	Quah Ting Wen (55.43); Cherlyn Yeoh (54.96); Christie Chue (56.42); Quah Jing Wen (56.30)	3:43.11	NR
18	1	8	South Africa	Erin Gallagher (55.17); Tayla Lovemore (56.21); Emma Chelius (55.28); Rebecca Meder (56.69)	3:43.35	AF

=== Final ===
The final was held at 21:33.

Rank	Lane	Nation	Swimmers	Time	Notes
1st place, gold medalist(s)	4	Australia	Bronte Campbell (52.85); Brianna Throssell (53.34); Emma McKeon (52.57); Cate Campbell (51.45)	3:30.21	CR
2nd place, silver medalist(s)	6	United States	Mallory Comerford (52.98); Abbey Weitzeil (52.66); Kelsi Dahlia (53.46); Simone Manuel (51.92)	3:31.02	AM
3rd place, bronze medalist(s)	5	Canada	Kayla Sanchez (53.72); Taylor Ruck (52.19); Penny Oleksiak (52.69); Maggie MacNeil (53.18)	3:31.78	NR
4	7	Netherlands	Kim Busch (55.23); Ranomi Kromowidjojo (52.92); Kira Toussaint (54.76); Femke Heemskerk (52.41)	3:35.32	
5	1	China	Yang Junxuan (53.68); Zhu Menghui (53.39); Wu Qingfeng (54.26); Wang Jingzhuo (54.50)	3:35.83	
6	3	Sweden	Sarah Sjöström (52.23); Michelle Coleman (53.88); Louise Hansson (54.33); Sophie Hansson (55.89)	3:36.33	
7	2	Japan	Tomomi Aoki (54.62); Aya Sato (53.91); Rio Shirai (54.23); Rika Omoto (54.03)	3:36.79	
8	8	Germany	Jessica Steiger (54.59); Julia Mrozinski (55.02); Reva Foos (54.72); Annika Bruhn (54.74)	3:39.07	
