= Swimming at the 2017 World Aquatics Championships – Women's 4 × 100 metre freestyle relay =

Women's 4 × 100 metre freestyle relay at the 2017 World Aquatics Championships
- Venue: Danube Arena
- Location: Budapest, Hungary
- Dates: 23 July (heats and final)
- Competitors: 59 from 13 nations
- Teams: 13

Medalists
gold medal	Mallory Comerford; Kelsi Worrell; Katie Ledecky; Simone Manuel; Lia Neal; Olivia Smoliga	United States
silver medal	Shayna Jack; Bronte Campbell; Brittany Elmslie; Emma McKeon; Emily Seebohm; Madison Wilson	Australia
bronze medal	Kim Busch; Femke Heemskerk; Maud van der Meer; Ranomi Kromowidjojo	Netherlands

The Women's 4 × 100 metre freestyle relay competition at the 2017 World Championships will be held on 23 July 2017.

== Records ==
Prior to the competition, the existing world and championship records were as follows.

World record	Australia	3:30.65	Rio de Janeiro, Brazil	6 August 2016
Competition record	Australia	3:31.48	Kazan, Russia	2 August 2015

== Results ==
=== Heats ===
The heats were held at 11:39.

Rank	Heat	Lane	Nation	Swimmers	Time	Notes
1	1	4	United States	Lia Neal (53.94); Kelsi Worrell (53.27); Olivia Smoliga (53.67); Mallory Comerford (52.47)	3:33.35	Q
2	1	5	Netherlands	Maud van der Meer (54.72); Femke Heemskerk (52.72); Kim Busch (54.79); Ranomi Kromowidjojo (52.03)	3:34.26	Q
3	2	4	Australia	Emily Seebohm (54.32); Madison Wilson (53.94); Brittany Elmslie (53.61); Shayna Jack (53.31)	3:35.18	Q
4	1	1	Sweden	Michelle Coleman (53.21); Sarah Sjöström (52.19); Nathalie Lindborg (55.90); Louise Hansson (54.20)	3:35.50	Q
5	2	5	Canada	Sandrine Mainville (53.87); Michelle Toro (54.50); Rebecca Smith (53.93); Kayla Sanchez (53.54)	3:35.84	Q
6	2	6	China	Zhu Menghui (54.06); Ai Yanhan (54.71); Wu Yue (54.46); Zhang Yufei (53.79)	3:37.02	Q
7	1	3	Japan	Rikako Ikee (54.09); Tomomi Aoki (54.34); Yui Yamane (54.59); Chihiro Igarashi (54.44)	3:37.46	Q
8	1	6	Denmark	Signe Bro (54.85); Sarah Bro (55.60); Emilie Beckmann (55.55); Pernille Blume (52.29)	3:38.29	Q
9	2	2	Hungary	Flóra Molnár (54.93); Fanni Gyurinovics (55.16); Evelyn Verrasztó (54.73); Zsuzsanna Jakabos (54.08)	3:38.90	
10	2	3	Italy	Silvia Di Pietro (54.80); Erika Ferraioli (54.91); Giorgia Biondani (55.47); Federica Pellegrini (53.90)	3:39.08	
11	2	1	Israel	Andrea Murez (54.79); Zohar Shikler (56.75); Keren Siebner (56.03); Amit Ivry (56.78)	3:44.35	
12	1	2	Hong Kong	Siobhán Haughey (53.99 NR); Claudia Lau (56.26); Ho Nam Wai (57.48); Sze Hang Yu (56.66)	3:44.39	
13	2	7	South Africa	Erin Gallagher (55.94); Kate Beavon (59.98); Samantha Randle (1:00.68); Kaylene Corbett (1:01.23)	3:57.83	
	1	7	Slovakia	DNS		

=== Final ===
The final was held at 19:03.

Rank	Lane	Nation	Swimmers	Time	Notes
1st place, gold medalist(s)	4	United States	Mallory Comerford (52.59 AM); Kelsi Worrell (53.16); Katie Ledecky (53.83); Simone Manuel (52.14)	3:31.72	AM
2nd place, silver medalist(s)	3	Australia	Shayna Jack (53.75); Bronte Campbell (52.14); Brittany Elmslie (53.83); Emma McKeon (52.29)	3:32.01	
3rd place, bronze medalist(s)	5	Netherlands	Kim Busch (54.05); Femke Heemskerk (52.84); Maud van der Meer (53.77); Ranomi Kromowidjojo (51.98)	3:32.64	
4	2	Canada	Sandrine Mainville (53.77); Chantal Van Landeghem (52.97); Kayla Sanchez (54.16); Penny Oleksiak (52.98)	3:33.88	
5	6	Sweden	Sarah Sjöström (51.71 WR); Michelle Coleman (52.68); Ida Lindborg (55.59); Louise Hansson (53.96)	3:33.94	NR
6	7	China	Zhu Menghui (53.79); Zhang Yufei (54.31); Wu Yue (54.96); Ai Yanhan (53.43)	3:36.49	
7	1	Japan	Rikako Ikee (54.59); Tomomi Aoki (54.45); Yui Yamane (54.62); Chihiro Igarashi (54.58)	3:38.24	
8	8	Denmark	Signe Bro (54.72); Sarah Bro (56.60); Emilie Beckmann (54.84); Pernille Blume (52.70)	3:38.86	
