= 2016 FINA World Swimming Championships (25 m) – 4 × 50 metre mixed freestyle relay =

4 × 50 metre mixed freestyle relay at the 2016 FINA World Swimming Championships (25 m)
- Venue: WFCU Centre
- Dates: 7 December (heats and final)
- Competitors: 52 from 13 nations
- Teams: 13
- Winning time: 1:29.73

Medalists
gold medal	Aleksei Brianskii; Vladimir Morozov; Maria Kameneva; Rozaliya Nasretdinova; Aleksandr Popkov	Russia
silver medal	Jesse Puts; Nyls Korstanje; Ranomi Kromowidjojo; Maaike de Waard; Kim Busch; Tamara van Vliet	Netherlands
bronze medal	Yuri Kisil; Markus Thormeyer; Michelle Williams; Sandrine Mainville; Mirando Richard-Jarry; Katerine Savard; Alexia Zevnik	Canada

The 4 × 50 metre mixed freestyle relay competition of the 2016 FINA World Swimming Championships (25 m) was held on 7 December 2016.

== Records ==
Prior to the competition, the existing world and championship records were as follows.

	Nation	Time	Location	Date
World record Championship record	United States	1:28.57	Doha	6 December 2014

== Results ==
=== Heats ===
The heats were held at 11:24.

Rank	Heat	Lane	Nation	Swimmers	Time	Notes
1	4	2	Netherlands	Jesse Puts (21.41); Nyls Korstanje (21.31); Kim Busch (24.21); Tamara van Vliet (24.37)	1:31.30	Q
2	2	2	Russia	Aleksei Brianskiy (21.50); Aleksandr Popkov (21.22); Mariia Kameneva (24.28); Rozaliya Nasretdinova (24.39)	1:31.39	Q
3	3	8	France	Yonel Govindin (21.97); Clément Mignon (21.19); Mélanie Henique (24.43); Anna Santamans (23.84)	1:31.43	Q
4	2	7	Belarus	Anton Latkin (21.80); Artsiom Machekim (21.58); Yuliya Khitraya (24.20); Aliaksandra Herasimenia (24.24)	1:31.82	Q
5	4	9	Finland	Andrei Tuomola (21.76); Ari-Pekka Liukkonen (21.09); Hanna-Maria Seppälä (24.30); Fanny Teijonsalo (24.88)	1:32.03	Q
6	4	3	Japan	Shinri Shioura (21.59); Kenta Ito (21.15); Sayuki Ouchi (24.63); Tomomi Aoki (24.68)	1:32.05	Q
7	2	0	Canada	Yuri Kisil (21.62); Mirando Richard-Jarry (21.99); Alexia Zevnik (24.28); Katerine Savard (24.57)	1:32.46	Q
8	2	8	Hungary	Maksim Lobanovskii (21.41); Ádám Telegdy (22.06); Zsuzsanna Jakabos (24.34); Evelyn Verrasztó (24.77)	1:32.58	Q
9	4	4	Denmark	Magnus Jakupsson (22.33); Anders Lie Nielsen (21.20); Julie Kepp Jensen (24.45); Emilie Beckmann (24.65)	1:32.63	Q
10	3	7	China	Lin Yongqing (22.14); Yu Hexin (21.62); Sun Meichen (24.48); Liu Xiang (24.44)	1:32.68	Q
11	4	5	United States	Dillon Virva (21.68); Michael Andrew (21.44); Madison Kennedy (24.63); Amanda Weir (25.19)	1:32.94	Q
12	1	3	South Africa	Brad Tandy (21.55); Douglas Erasmus (21.39); Tayla Lovemore (24.76); Gabi Grobler (26.08)	1:33.78	Q
13	3	5	Sweden	Daniel Forndal (22.83); Robin Andreasson (21.48); Nathalie Lindborg (25.23); Ida Lindborg (24.97)	1:34.51	Q

=== Final ===
The final was held at 20:29.

Rank	Lane	Nation	Swimmers	Time	Notes
1st place, gold medalist(s)	5	Russia	Aleksei Brianskiy (21.40); Vladimir Morozov (20.44); Mariia Kameneva (24.01); Rozaliya Nasretdinova (23.88)	1:29.73	
2nd place, silver medalist(s)	4	Netherlands	Jesse Puts (21.27); Nyls Korstanje (21.15); Ranomi Kromowidjojo (23.34); Maaike de Waard (24.06)	1:29.82	
3rd place, bronze medalist(s)	1	Canada	Yuri Kisil (21.39); Markus Thormeyer (21.28); Michelle Williams (23.48); Sandrine Mainville (23.68)	1:29.83	
4	3	France	Clément Mignon (21.56); Jérémy Stravius (21.05); Anna Santamans (23.64); Mélanie Henique (23.71)	1:29.96	
5	7	Japan	Shinri Shioura (21.32); Kenta Ito (21.07); Sayuki Ouchi (24.70); Rikako Ikee (23.86)	1:30.95	
6	6	Belarus	Anton Latkin (21.86); Artsiom Machekin (21.22); Yuliya Khitraya (23.94); Aliaksandra Herasimenia (24.30)	1:31.32	
7	8	Hungary	Maksim Lobanovskii (21.70); Ádám Telegdy (21.71); Zsuzsanna Jakabos (24.48); Evelyn Verrasztó (25.09)	1:32.98	
	2	Finland	Andrei Tuomola (21.87); Ari-Pekka Liukkonen (20.87); Hanna-Maria Seppälä (24.43); Fanny Teijonsalo		DSQ
