= 2016 FINA World Swimming Championships (25 m) – Women's 100 metre butterfly =

Women's 100 metre butterfly at the 2016 FINA World Swimming Championships (25 m)
- Venue: WFCU Centre
- Dates: 10 December (heats and semifinals); 11 December (final)
- Competitors: 61 from 53 nations
- Winning time: 55.12

Medalists
gold medal	Katinka Hosszú	Hungary
silver medal	Kelsi Worrell	United States
bronze medal	Rikako Ikee	Japan

The Women's 100 Metre Butterfly competition of the 2016 FINA World Swimming Championships (25 m) was held on 10 and 11 December 2016.

== Records ==
Prior to the competition, the existing world and championship records were as follows:

	Name	Nation	Time	Location	Date
World record Championship record	Sarah Sjöström	Sweden	54.61	Doha	7 December 2014

== Results ==
=== Heats ===
The heats were held at 10:34:

Rank	Heat	Lane	Name	Nationality	Time	Notes
1	7	4	Kelsi Worrell	United States	56.11	Q
2	5	5	Katerine Savard	Canada	56.75	Q
3	5	4	Rikako Ikee	Japan	56.83	Q
4	6	4	Katinka Hosszú	Hungary	56.99	Q
5	7	3	Daiene Dias	Brazil	57.17	Q
6	6	5	Sarah Gibson	United States	57.20	Q
7	6	3	Svetlana Chimrova	Russia	57.56	Q
8	7	6	Emily Washer	Australia	57.62	Q
9	6	6	Emilie Beckmann	Denmark	57.66	Q
10	6	2	Kim Busch	Netherlands	57.79	Q
11	7	2	Lucie Svěcená	Czech Republic	57.91	Q, NR
12	6	7	Asuka Kobayashi	Japan	57.96	Q
13	7	7	Sze Hang Yu	Hong Kong	58.02	Q, NR
14	5	2	Marie Wattel	France	58.06	Q
15	7	1	Chan Kin Lok	Hong Kong	58.16	Q
16	7	8	Maria Ugolkova	Switzerland	58.20	Q
17	5	3	Kimberly Buys	Belgium	58.26	
18	6	1	Laura Stephens	Great Britain	59.19	
19	5	7	Sara Junevik	Sweden	59.29	
20	5	6	Nastja Govejšek	Slovenia	59.35	
21	7	0	Audrey Lacroix	Canada	59.44	
22	4	3	Tayla Lovemore	South Africa	59.47	
23	6	0	Hanna Rosvall	Sweden	59.78	
24	5	8	Barbora Mišendová	Slovakia	59.81	
25	6	8	Emilia Bottas	Finland	59.84	
26	5	1	Lisa Hopink	Germany	59.92	
27	4	5	Bryndis Hansen	Iceland	59.95	NR
28	4	6	Felicity Passon	Seychelles	59.99	NR
29	4	2	Martina van Berkel	Switzerland	1:00.10	
30	7	9	Wang Siqi	China	1:00.31	
31	6	9	Amina Kajtaz	Bosnia and Herzegovina	1:00.36	
32	4	4	Nida Eliz Üstündağ	Turkey	1:00.45	
33	5	9	Patarawadee Kittiya	Thailand	1:00.59	
34	5	0	Fanny Teijonsalo	Finland	1:00.88	
35	4	7	Beatričė Kanapienytė	Lithuania	1:01.41	
36	4	1	Marina Chan	Singapore	1:02.00	
37	3	5	Emily Muteti	Kenya	1:02.31	NR
38	3	0	Hoong En Qi	Singapore	1:02.88	
39	3	4	Kelsie Campbell	Jamaica	1:02.90	NR
40	3	3	Celina Marquez	El Salvador	1:03.15	NR
41	3	7	Sara Pastrana	Honduras	1:03.62	NR
42	3	6	María José Ribera	Bolivia	1:04.10	
43	4	8	Sarah Hadj-Abderrahmane	Algeria	1:04.41	
44	3	2	Ireyra Tamayo Periñan	Panama	1:04.65	NR
45	4	9	Ana Sofia Nóbrega	Angola	1:04.66	
46	4	0	Inés Marín	Chile	1:04.99	
47	2	4	Tieri Erasito	Fiji	1:05.42	
48	2	2	Kim Sol-song	North Korea	1:05.64	
49	1	5	Rosalee Mira Santa Ana	Philippines	1:05.66	
50	3	8	Kuan I Cheng	Macau	1:06.09	
51	3	1	Katie Kyle	Saint Lucia	1:06.23	NR
52	3	9	Alania Suttie	Samoa	1:06.66	NR
53	2	5	Estellah Fils Rabetsara	Madagascar	1:06.72	
54	2	1	Stefania Piccardo	Paraguay	1:06.86	
55	2	6	Annah Auckburaullee	Mauritius	1:07.57	
56	2	8	Gabriela Hernandez	Nicaragua	1:07.73	
57	2	7	Mariel Mencia	Dominican Republic	1:09.24	
58	2	0	Annie Hepler	Marshall Islands	1:11.18	NR
59	2	9	Charissa Panuve	Tonga	1:14.62	
60	1	4	Anthea Mudanye	Uganda	1:20.65	NR
	1	3	Laraiba Seibou	Benin		DSQ
	2	3	Samantha Roberts	Antigua and Barbuda		DNS
	7	5	Lu Ying	China		DNS

=== Semifinals ===
The semifinals were held at 19:00:

==== Semifinal 1 ====
Rank	Lane	Name	Nationality	Time	Notes
1	5	Katinka Hosszú	Hungary	55.82	Q
2	3	Sarah Gibson	United States	56.88	Q
3	4	Katerine Savard	Canada	56.93	Q
4	6	Emily Washer	Australia	57.44	Q
5	1	Marie Wattel	France	57.45	
6	8	Maria Ugolkova	Switzerland	57.66	NR
7	2	Kim Busch	Netherlands	57.91	
8	7	Asuka Kobayashi	Japan	58.28	

==== Semifinal 2 ====
Rank	Lane	Name	Nationality	Time	Notes
1	4	Kelsi Worrell	United States	55.80	Q
2	5	Rikako Ikee	Japan	56.68	Q
3	3	Daiene Dias	Brazil	57.10	Q
4	6	Svetlana Chimrova	Russia	57.16	Q
5	2	Emilie Beckmann	Denmark	57.54	
6	7	Lucie Svěcená	Czech Republic	57.76	NR
7	1	Sze Hang Yu	Hong Kong	58.17	
8	8	Chan Kin Lok	Hong Kong	58.27	

=== Final ===
The final was held at 19:38:

Rank	Lane	Name	Nationality	Time	Notes
1st place, gold medalist(s)	5	Katinka Hosszú	Hungary	55.12	NR
2nd place, silver medalist(s)	4	Kelsi Worrell	United States	55.22	AM
3rd place, bronze medalist(s)	3	Rikako Ikee	Japan	55.64	WJ, NR
4	2	Katerine Savard	Canada	56.15	NR
5	1	Svetlana Chimrova	Russia	57.12	
6	6	Sarah Gibson	United States	57.22	
7	8	Emily Washer	Australia	57.35	
8	7	Daiene Dias	Brazil	57.56	
