= Swimming at the 2019 Pan American Games – Women's 4 × 100 metre medley relay =

Women's 4 × 100 metre medley relay at the 2019 Pan American Games
- Venues: Villa Deportiva Nacional, VIDENA
- Dates: August 10 (preliminaries and finals)
- Competitors: 53 from 9 nations
- Winning time: 3:57.64

Medalists
Gold medal	Phoebe Bacon; Anne Lazor; Kendyl Stewart; Margo Geer; Isabelle Stadden; Molly Hannis; Sarah Gibson; Lia Neal	United States
Silver medal	Danielle Hanus; Faith Knelson; Haley Black; Alexia Zevnik; Mackenzie Glover; Mary-Sophie Harvey; Katerine Savard; Alyson Ackman	Canada
Bronze medal	Etiene Medeiros; Jhennifer Conceição; Giovanna Diamante; Larissa Oliveira; Fernanda de Goeij; Pâmela de Souza; Daynara de Paula; Manuella Lyrio	Brazil

The women's 4 × 100 metre medley relay competition of the swimming events at the 2019 Pan American Games are scheduled to be held August 10th, 2019 at the Villa Deportiva Nacional Videna cluster.

== Records ==
Prior to this competition, the existing world and Pan American Games records were as follows:

World record	United States (USA); Regan Smith (57.57); Lilly King (1:04.81); Kelsi Dahlia (56.16); Simone Manuel (51.86)	3:50.40	Gwangju, South Korea	July 28, 2019
Pan American Games record	United States (USA); Natalie Coughlin (59.05); Katie Meili (1:06.06); Kelsi Worrell (57.34); Allison Schmitt (54.08)	3:56.53	Toronto, Canada	July 18, 2015

== Results ==
KEY:	q	Fastest non-qualifiers	Q	Qualified	GR	Games record	NR	National record	PB	Personal best	SB	Seasonal best

=== Heats ===
The first round was held on August 10.

Rank	Heat	Lane	Name	Nationality	Time	Notes
1	2	4	Isabelle Stadden (1:00.29); Molly Hannis (1:08.20); Sarah Gibson (1:00.39); Lia Neal (55.44)	United States	4:04.32	Q
2	2	3	Fernanda de Goeij (1:02.46); Pâmela de Souza (1:09.57); Daynara de Paula (1:01.20); Manuella Lyrio (56.59)	Brazil	4:09.82	Q
3	1	4	Mackenzie Glover (1:03.16); Mary-Sophie Harvey (1:11.32); Katerine Savard (1:00.30); Alyson Ackman (55.48)	Canada	4:10.26	Q
4	1	5	Andrea Berrino (1:03.24); Julia Sebastián (1:10.04); Macarena Ceballos (1:02.29); Florencia Perotti (59.87)	Argentina	4:15.44	Q
5	2	5	Athena Meneses (1:05.15); Esther González (1:11.21); Diana Luna (1:01.84); Tayde Revilak (58.49)	Mexico	4:16.69	Q
6	1	6	Alexia Sotomayor (1:05.51); Paula Tamashiro (1:11.66); María Fe Muñoz (1:02.68); McKenna DeBever (57.12)	Peru	4:16.97	Q, NR
7	1	3	Carla González (1:06.77); Mercedes Toledo (1:11.87); Isabella Paez (1:01.38); Fabiana Pesce (59.10)	Venezuela	4:19.12	Q
8	2	6	Margaret Higgs (1:07.83); Lillian Higgs (1:12.71); Laura Morley (1:07.19); Ariel Weech (58.87)	Bahamas	4:26.60	Q
9	2	2	Carolina Cermelli (1:05.88); Emily Santos (1:16.02); Ireyra Tamayo (1:05.69); Catherine Cooper (1:00.28)	Panama	4:27.87	

=== Final ===
The final round was also on August 10.

Rank	Lane	Name	Nationality	Time	Notes
1st place, gold medalist(s)	4	Phoebe Bacon (59.02)GR; Anne Lazor (1:06.35); Kendyl Stewart (58.62); Margo Geer (53.65)	United States	3:57.64	
2nd place, silver medalist(s)	3	Danielle Hanus (1:00.45); Faith Knelson (1:07.57); Haley Black (59.12); Alexia Zevnik (54.76)	Canada	4:01.90	
3rd place, bronze medalist(s)	5	Etiene Medeiros (1:00.99); Jhennifer Conceição (1:08.39); Giovanna Diamante (1:00.52); Larissa Oliveira (55.06)	Brazil	4:04.96	
4	6	Andrea Berrino (1:02.70); Julia Sebastián (1:06.83); Virginia Bardach (1:01.28); Macarena Ceballos (56.89)	Argentina	4:07.70	
5	2	Celia Pulido Ortíz (1:05.56); Melissa Rodríguez (1:08.26); Diana Luna (1:01.89); Monika González-Hermosillo (57.40)	Mexico	4:11.15	
6	1	Carla González (1:05.56); Mercedes Toledo (1:10.05); Isabella Paez (1:00.55); Jeserik Pinto (57.82)	Venezuela	4:13.98	
7	7	Alexia Sotomayor (1:04.68); Paula Tamashiro (1:10.75); María Fe Muñoz (1:02.49); McKenna DeBever (56.20)	Peru	4:14.12	NR
8	8	Margaret Higgs (1:07.79); Lillian Higgs (1:12.77); Laura Morley (1:07.42); Ariel Weech (59.54)	Bahamas	4:27.52	
