= 2018 Pan Pacific Swimming Championships – Women's 4 × 100 metre freestyle relay =

Women's 4 × 100 metre freestyle relay at the 2018 Pan Pacific Swimming Championships
- Venue: Tokyo Tatsumi International Swimming Center
- Dates: 11 August
- Competitors: 20 from 5 nations
- Winning time: 3:31.58

Medalists
gold medal	Emily Seebohm; Shayna Jack; Emma McKeon; Cate Campbell	Australia
silver medal	Mallory Comerford; Margo Geer; Kelsi Dahlia; Simone Manuel	United States
bronze medal	Taylor Ruck; Kayla Sanchez; Rebecca Smith; Alexia Zevnik	Canada

The women's 4 × 100 metre freestyle relay competition at the 2018 Pan Pacific Swimming Championships took place on August 11 at the Tokyo Tatsumi International Swimming Center. The defending champion was Australia.

== Records ==
Prior to this competition, the existing world and Pan Pacific records were as follows:

World record	Australia (AUS); Shayna Jack (54.03); Bronte Campbell (52.03); Emma McKeon (52.99); Cate Campbell (51.00)	3:30.05	Gold Coast, Australia	5 April 2018
Pan Pacific Championships record	Australia (AUS); Cate Campbell (52.89); Brittany Elmslie (53.72); Melanie Schlanger (52.97); Bronte Campbell (52.88)	3:32.46	Gold Coast, Australia	23 August 2014

== Results ==
All times are in minutes and seconds.

KEY:	CR	Championships record	NR	National record	PB	Personal best	SB	Seasonal best

=== Final ===
The final was held on 11 August from 18:00.

Rank	Lane	Nation	Swimmers	Time	Notes
1st place, gold medalist(s)	4	Australia	Emily Seebohm (54.56); Shayna Jack (53.10); Emma McKeon (52.56); Cate Campbell (51.36)	3:31.58	CR
2nd place, silver medalist(s)	5	United States	Mallory Comerford (53.48); Margo Geer (53.59); Kelsi Dahlia (53.59); Simone Manuel (52.79)	3:33.45	
3rd place, bronze medalist(s)	3	Canada	Taylor Ruck (52.85); Kayla Sanchez (53.11); Rebecca Smith (54.00); Alexia Zevnik (54.11)	3:34.07	
4	6	Japan	Rikako Ikee (53.46); Mayuka Yamamoto (54.51); Tomomi Aoki (54.01); Chihiro Igarashi (54.95)	3:36.93	
5	2	Philippines	Rosalee Santa Ana (59.58); Miranda Renner (59.30); Chloe Isleta (58.47); Nicole Oliva (57.45)	3:54.80	
