= 2018 Pan Pacific Swimming Championships – Women's 100 metre butterfly =

Women's 100 metre butterfly at the 2018 Pan Pacific Swimming Championships
- Venue: Tokyo Tatsumi International Swimming Center
- Dates: 11 August (heats & finals)
- Competitors: 20 from 6 nations
- Winning time: 56.08

Medalists
gold medal	Rikako Ikee	Japan
silver medal	Kelsi Dahlia	United States
bronze medal	Emma McKeon	Australia

The women's 100 metre butterfly competition at the 2018 Pan Pacific Swimming Championships took place on August 11 at the Tokyo Tatsumi International Swimming Center. The defending champion was Alicia Coutts of Australia.

== Records ==
Prior to this competition, the existing world and Pan Pacific records were as follows:

World record	Sarah Sjöström (SWE)	55.48	Rio de Janeiro, Brazil	7 August 2016
Pan Pacific Championships record	Jessicah Schipper (AUS)	57.30	Victoria, Canada	19 August 2006

== Results ==
All times are in minutes and seconds.

KEY:	QA	Qualified A Final	QB	Qualified B Final	CR	Championships record	NR	National record	PB	Personal best	SB	Seasonal best

=== Heats ===
The first round was held on 11 August from 10:00.

Only two swimmers from each country may advance to the A or B final. If a country not qualify any swimmer to the A final, that same country may qualify up to three swimmers to the B final.

Rank	Name	Nationality	Time	Notes
1	Rikako Ikee	Japan	56.90	QA, CR
2	Kelsi Dahlia	United States	57.36	QA
3	Emma McKeon	Australia	57.99	QA
4	Rebecca Smith	Canada	58.13	QA
5	Mallory Comerford	United States	58.23	QA
6	Katie McLaughlin	United States	58.34	QB
7	Brianna Throssell	Australia	58.47	QA
8	Regan Smith	United States	58.59	QB
9	Ai Soma	Japan	58.70	QA
10	Laura Taylor	Australia	59.36	QB
11	Yui Yamane	Japan	59.41	QB
12	Suzuka Hasegawa	Japan	59.52	QB
13	Sachi Mochida	Japan	59.68	
14	Danielle Hanus	Canada	59.69	QA
15	Mabel Zavaros	Canada	1:00.34	QB
16	Kyla Leibel	Canada	1:01.54	QB
17	Miranda Renner	Philippines	1:06.32	QB
18	Gianna Garcia	Philippines	1:13.05	
19	Mineri Gomez	Guam	1:15.89	
–	Madeline Groves	Australia	DNS	

=== B Final ===
The B final was held on 11 August from 18:00.

Rank	Name	Nationality	Time	Notes
9	Katie McLaughlin	United States	57.80	
10	Regan Smith	United States	58.62	
11	Yui Yamane	Japan	59.55	
12	Laura Taylor	Australia	59.69	
13	Suzuka Hasegawa	Japan	59.78	
14	Mabel Zavaros	Canada	1:00.22	
15	Kyla Leibel	Canada	1:00.75	
16	Miranda Renner	Philippines	1:04.63	

=== A Final ===
The A final was held on 11 August from 18:00.

Rank	Name	Nationality	Time	Notes
1st place, gold medalist(s)	Rikako Ikee	Japan	56.08	CR, NR
2nd place, silver medalist(s)	Kelsi Dahlia	United States	56.44	
3rd place, bronze medalist(s)	Emma McKeon	Australia	56.54	
4	Rebecca Smith	Canada	58.19	
5	Mallory Comerford	United States	58.25	
6	Brianna Throssell	Australia	58.80	
7	Ai Soma	Japan	58.87	
8	Danielle Hanus	Canada	59.19	
