= 2016 FINA World Swimming Championships (25 m) – Women's 50 metre butterfly =

Competition at FINA World Swimming Championships (2016)

Women's 50 metre butterfly at the 2016 FINA World Swimming Championships (25 m)
- Venue: WFCU Centre
- Dates: 8 December (heats and semifinals); 9 December (final)
- Competitors: 73 from 61 nations
- Winning time: 24.92

Medalists
gold medal	Jeanette Ottesen	Denmark
silver medal	Kelsi Worrell	United States
bronze medal	Rikako Ikee	Japan

The Women's 50 metre butterfly competition of the 2016 FINA World Swimming Championships (25 m) was held on 8 and 9 December 2016.

== Records ==
Prior to the competition, the existing world and championship records were as follows.

	Name	Nation	Time	Location	Date
World record	Therese Alshammar	Sweden	24.38	Singapore	22 November 2009
Championship record	Sarah Sjöström	Sweden	24.58	Doha	5 December 2014

== Results ==
=== Heats ===
The heats were held at 09:51.

Rank	Heat	Lane	Name	Nationality	Time	Notes
1	8	3	Kelsi Worrell	United States	24.94	Q, AM
2	6	4	Silvia Di Pietro	Italy	25.37	Q
3	8	4	Jeanette Ottesen	Denmark	25.38	Q
4	8	6	Rikako Ikee	Japan	25.55	Q, WJR
5	8	5	Maaike de Waard	Netherlands	25.62	Q
6	7	4	Mélanie Henique	France	25.65	Q
7	6	8	Emily Washer	Australia	25.88	Q
7	8	2	Emilie Beckmann	Denmark	25.88	Q
9	6	6	Katerine Savard	Canada	25.96	Q
10	6	1	Sarah Gibson	United States	25.98	Q
11	7	7	Sara Junevik	Sweden	26.06	Q
12	6	2	Svetlana Chimrova	Russia	26.11	Q
12	7	6	Kimberly Buys	Belgium	26.11	Q
14	8	1	Lucie Svěcená	Czech Republic	26.18	Q, NR
15	7	3	Bryndis Hansen	Iceland	26.22	Q, NR
16	6	7	Nastja Govejšek	Slovenia	26.26	Q
17	8	8	Tayla Lovemore	South Africa	26.35	
18	7	1	Marie Wattel	France	26.38	
19	7	2	Daiene Dias	Brazil	26.43	
20	8	7	Rozaliya Nasretdinova	Russia	26.49	
21	8	0	Asuka Kobayashi	Japan	26.63	
22	5	4	Zhou Yilin	China	26.67	
23	8	9	Sze Hang Yu	Hong Kong	26.83	
24	6	0	Amina Kajtaz	Bosnia and Herzegovina	26.87	
25	6	9	Jenjira Srisa-Ard	Thailand	26.93	NR
25	7	8	Barbora Mišendová	Slovakia	26.93	
27	5	7	Felicity Passon	Seychelles	27.20	NR
28	7	9	Gabriela Ņikitina	Latvia	27.23	
29	7	0	Fanny Teijonsalo	Finland	27.35	
30	5	3	Barbora Seemanová	Czech Republic	27.36	
31	5	1	Lin Pei-wun	Chinese Taipei	27.38	
32	7	5	Lu Ying	China	27.47	
33	5	5	Marina Chan	Singapore	27.57	
34	4	1	Hanna-Maria Seppälä	Finland	27.58	
35	5	6	María José Ribera	Bolivia	27.86	
36	5	8	Beatričė Kanapienytė	Lithuania	27.89	
37	4	4	Nicole Rautemberg	Paraguay	28.03	
38	4	5	Emily Muteti	Kenya	28.04	NR
39	4	8	Celina Marquez	El Salvador	28.05	NR
40	5	9	Hoong En Qi	Singapore	28.06	
41	4	6	Jasmine Alkhaldi	Philippines	28.08	
42	5	0	Chade Nersicio	Curaçao	28.16	NR
43	5	2	Nida Eliz Üstündağ	Turkey	28.21	
44	4	3	Kelsie Campbell	Jamaica	28.27	
45	3	5	Allyson Ponson	Aruba	28.38	NR
46	4	2	Bexx Heyliger	Bermuda	28.43	
47	3	2	Caylee Watson	United States Virgin Islands	28.44	NR
48	2	4	Matelita Buadromo	Fiji	28.83	
49	3	4	Katie Kyle	Saint Lucia	29.05	NR
50	4	7	Izzy Joachim	Saint Vincent and the Grenadines	29.07	NR
51	3	3	Jennifer Rizkallah	Lebanon	29.36	
52	3	8	Long Chi Wai	Macau	29.47	
53	1	2	Anastasia Bogdanovski	Macedonia	29.48	NR
54	4	9	Samantha Roberts	Antigua and Barbuda	29.52	NR
55	3	0	Annie Hepler	Marshall Islands	29.58	NR
56	3	7	Ana Sofia Nóbrega	Angola	29.59	
57	4	0	Kuan I Cheng	Macau	29.71	
58	2	5	Kim Sol-song	North Korea	29.75	
59	3	1	Annah Auckburaullee	Mauritius	29.85	
60	3	6	Gabriela Hernandez	Nicaragua	29.87	
61	2	3	Alma Castillo	Paraguay	30.02	
62	2	0	Sonia Tumiotto	Tanzania	30.12	NR
63	3	9	Mariel Mencia	Dominican Republic	30.14	
64	2	6	Jamila Sanmoogan	Guyana	30.35	NR
65	2	2	Christina Linares	Gibraltar	30.90	NR
66	2	8	Colleen Furgeson	Marshall Islands	31.10	
67	2	1	Flaka Pruthi	Kosovo	31.56	
68	2	9	Charissa Panuve	Tonga	32.34	
69	1	4	Angel de Jesus	Northern Mariana Islands	32.65	NR
70	1	5	Vitiny Hemthon	Cambodia	32.77	NR
71	2	7	Diana Basho	Albania	32.97	
72	1	3	Anthea Mudanye	Uganda	34.97	
73	1	6	Sompathana Chamberlain	Laos	35.82	
	1	1	Fatoumata Samassékou	Mali		DNS
	1	7	Rahel Gebreselassie	Ethiopia		DNS
	6	3	Emily Seebohm	Australia		DNS
	6	5	Ranomi Kromowidjojo	Netherlands		DNS

=== Semifinals ===
The semifinals were held at 19:15.

==== Semifinal 1 ====
Rank	Lane	Name	Nationality	Time	Notes
1	4	Silvia Di Pietro	Italy	25.50	Q
2	5	Rikako Ikee	Japan	25.63	Q
3	3	Mélanie Henique	France	25.66	Q
4	6	Emilie Beckmann	Denmark	25.75	Q
5	2	Sarah Gibson	United States	25.83	
6	7	Svetlana Chimrova	Russia	26.05	
7	1	Lucie Svěcená	Czech Republic	26.09	NR
8	8	Nastja Govejšek	Slovenia	26.16	

==== Semifinal 2 ====
Rank	Lane	Name	Nationality	Time	Notes
1	4	Kelsi Worrell	United States	25.18	Q
2	5	Jeanette Ottesen	Denmark	25.29	Q
3	3	Maaike de Waard	Netherlands	25.59	Q
4	2	Katerine Savard	Canada	25.76	Q
5	1	Kimberly Buys	Belgium	25.90	
6	6	Emily Washer	Australia	25.92	
7	7	Sara Junevik	Sweden	26.22	
8	8	Bryndis Hansen	Iceland	26.38	

=== Final ===
The final was held at 18:37.

Rank	Lane	Name	Nationality	Time	Notes
1st place, gold medalist(s)	5	Jeanette Ottesen	Denmark	24.92	
2nd place, silver medalist(s)	4	Kelsi Worrell	United States	25.27	
3rd place, bronze medalist(s)	2	Rikako Ikee	Japan	25.32	WJR, NR
4	7	Mélanie Henique	France	25.33	
5	3	Silvia Di Pietro	Italy	25.35	
6	8	Katerine Savard	Canada	25.51	NR
7	1	Emilie Beckmann	Denmark	25.54	
8	6	Maaike de Waard	Netherlands	25.66	
