= Swimming at the 2019 Pan American Games – Women's 100 metre butterfly =

Women's 100 metre butterfly at the 2019 Pan American Games
- Venues: Villa Deportiva Nacional, VIDENA
- Dates: August 7 (preliminaries and finals)
- Competitors: 21 from 15 nations

Medalists
Gold medal	Kendyl Stewart	United States
Silver medal	Danielle Hanus	Canada
Bronze medal	Sarah Gibson	United States

The women's 100 metre butterfly competition of the swimming events at the 2019 Pan American Games are scheduled to be held August 7th, 2019 at the Villa Deportiva Nacional Videna cluster.

== Records ==
Prior to this competition, the existing world and Pan American Games records were as follows:

World record	Sarah Sjöström (SWE)	55.48	Rio de Janeiro, Brazil	August 7, 2016
Pan American Games record	Kelsi Worrell (USA)	57.24	Toronto, Canada	July 16, 2015

== Results ==
KEY:	q	Fastest non-qualifiers	Q	Qualified	GR	Games record	NR	National record	PB	Personal best	SB	Seasonal best

=== Heats ===
The first round will be held on August 7.

Rank	Heat	Lane	Name	Nationality	Time	Notes
1	3	4	Kendyl Stewart	United States	58.82	QA
2	2	5	Danielle Hanus	Canada	58.94	QA
3	2	4	Sarah Gibson	United States	59.16	QA
4	3	5	Haley Black	Canada	59.30	QA
5	1	4	Daynara de Paula	Brazil	1:00.21	QA
6	1	5	Giovanna Diamante	Brazil	1:00.32	QA
7	1	3	Valentina Becerra	Colombia	1:00.64	QA
8	2	3	Jeserik Pinto	Venezuela	1:00.87	QA
9	3	3	Isabella Paez	Venezuela	1:01.44	QB
10	1	6	Karen Torrez	Bolivia	1:01.73	QB
11	3	6	Diana Luna Sánchez	Mexico	1:02.05	QB
12	2	6	Athena Kovacs	Mexico	1:02.31	QB
13	3	7	Celismar Guzman	Puerto Rico	1:02.58	QB
14	3	2	Anicka Delgado	Ecuador	1:02.69	QB
15	1	2	María Fe Muñoz	Peru	1:02.92	QB
16	2	7	Silvana Cabrera	Peru	1:03.30	QB
17	2	2	Julimar Avila	Honduras	1:03.35	
18	2	1	Maria Schutzmeier	Nicaragua	1:03.99	
19	3	1	Emily MacDonald	Jamaica	1:04.74	
20	1	7	Lorena González Mendoza	Cuba	1:05.58	
21	1	1	Madelyn Moore	Bermuda	1:06.15	

=== Final B ===
The B final was also held on August 7.

Rank	Lane	Name	Nationality	Time	Notes
9	7	Anicka Delgado	Ecuador	1:01.27	NR
10	6	Athena Kovacs	Mexico	1:01.61	
11	5	Karen Torrez	Bolivia	1:01.80	
12	4	Isabella Paez	Venezuela	1:01.85	
13	3	Diana Luna Sánchez	Mexico	1:01.96	
14	2	Celismar Guzman	Puerto Rico	1:02.78	
15	1	María Fe Muñoz	Peru	1:02.88	
16	8	Silvana Cabrera	Peru	1:03.79	

=== Final A ===
The A final was also held on August 7.

Rank	Lane	Name	Nationality	Time	Notes
1st place, gold medalist(s)	4	Kendyl Stewart	United States	58.49	
2nd place, silver medalist(s)	3	Danielle Hanus	Canada	58.93	
3rd place, bronze medalist(s)	5	Sarah Gibson	United States	59.11	
4	7	Giovanna Diamante	Brazil	59.31	
5	6	Haley Black	Canada	59.32	
6	2	Daynara de Paula	Brazil	1:00.41	
7	8	Jeserik Pinto	Venezuela	1:00.64	
8	1	Valentina Becerra	Colombia	1:01.10	
