= Swimming at the 2015 Pan American Games – Women's 4 × 100 metre medley relay =

Women's 4 × 100 metre medley relay at the 2015 Pan American Games
- Venue: CIBC Pan Am/Parapan Am Aquatics Centre and Field House
- Dates: July 18 (preliminaries and finals)
- Competitors: 40 from 8 nations
- Winning time: 3:56.53

Medalists
Gold medal	Natalie Coughlin; Katie Meili; Kelsi Worrell; Allison Schmitt; United States
Silver medal	Dominique Bouchard; Rachel Nicol; Noemie Thomas; Chantal van Landeghem; Tera van Beilen; Sandrine Mainville; Canada
Bronze medal	Etiene Medeiros; Jhennifer Conceição; Daynara de Paula; Larissa Oliveira; Natalia de Luccas; Beatriz Travalon; Brazil

The women's 4 × 100 metre medley relay competition of the swimming events at the 2015 Pan American Games took place on July 18 at the CIBC Pan Am/Parapan Am Aquatics Centre and Field House in Toronto, Canada. The defending Pan American Games champion is the United States.

This race consisted of eight lengths of the pool. Each of the four swimmers completed two lengths of the pool. The order of swimming styles is: Backstroke, Breaststroke, Butterfly and Freestyle. The first swimmer had to touch the wall before the second could leave the starting block.

== Records ==
Prior to this competition, the existing world and Pan American Games records were as follows:

World record	United States (USA); Missy Franklin (58.50); Rebecca Soni (1:04.82); Dana Vollmer (55.48); Allison Schmitt (53.25)	3:52.05	London, United Kingdom	August 4, 2012
Pan American Games record	United States (USA); Rachel Bootsma (1:00.46); Ann Chandler (1:07.59); Claire Donahue (59.03); Amanda Kendall (53.92)	4:01.00	Guadalajara, Mexico	October 21, 2011

The following new records were set during this competition.

Date	Event	Nation	Time	Record
18 July	Heat 1	United States	3:57.35	GR
18 July	Final	United States	3:56.53	GR

== Schedule ==
All times are Eastern Time Zone (UTC-4).

Date	Time	Round
July 18, 2015	11:29	Heats
July 18, 2015	20:29	Final

== Results ==
=== Heats ===
The first round was held on July 18. As only eight teams had entered, the heats served as a ranking round with all eight teams advancing to the final.

Rank	Heat	Lane	Name	Nationality	Time	Notes
1	1	4	Natalie Coughlin (59.20 GR); Katie Meili (1:06.57); Kelsi Worrell (57.63); Allison Schmitt (53.95)	United States	3:57.35	Q, GR
2	1	5	Dominique Bouchard (1:01.18); Tera van Beilen (1:09.04); Noemie Thomas (58.30); Sandrine Mainville (53.76)	Canada	4:02.28	Q
3	1	3	Natalia de Luccas (1:03.07); Beatriz Travalon (1:10.08); Daynara de Paula (1:01.09); Larissa Oliveira (56.82)	Brazil	4:11.06	Q
4	1	1	Estela Davis (1:04.09); Byanca Rodriguez (1:09.62); Diana Luna (1:01.73); Liliana Ibáñez (57.19)	Mexico	4:12.63	Q
5	1	6	Andrea Berrino (1:03.50); Macarena Ceballos (1:11.50); Belen Diaz (1:03.86); Aixa Triay (56.80)	Argentina	4:15.66	Q
6	1	2	Jeserik Pinto (1:03.99); Mercedes Toledo (1:13.14); Isabella Paez (1:01.86); Andrea Garrido (1:01.23)	Venezuela	4:20.22	Q
7	1	7	Danielle Boothe (1:06.78); Breanna Roman (1:13.60); Trudian Patrick (1:04.49); Alia Atkinson (59.31)	Jamaica	4:24.18	Q
8	1	8	Andrea Cedrón (1:09.10); Paula Tamashiro (1:16.74); McKenna DeBever (1:07.97); Jessica Cattaneo (58.81)	Peru	4:32.62	Q

=== Final ===
The final was held on July 18.

Rank	Lane	Name	Nationality	Time	Notes
1st place, gold medalist(s)	4	Natalie Coughlin (59.05 GR); Katie Meili (1:06.06); Kelsi Worrell (57.34); Allison Schmitt (54.08)	United States	3:56.53	GR
2nd place, silver medalist(s)	5	Dominique Bouchard (1:00.85); Rachel Nicol (1:06.78); Noemie Thomas (57.58); Chantal van Landeghem (53.30)	Canada	3:58.51	
3rd place, bronze medalist(s)	3	Etiene Medeiros (1:00.65); Jhennifer Conceição (1:08.50); Daynara de Paula (58.41); Larissa Oliveira (54.96)	Brazil	4:02.52	
4	2	Andrea Berrino (1:02.09); Macarena Ceballos (1:09.73); Belen Diaz (1:00.93); Aixa Triay (55.49)	Argentina	4:08.24	NR
5	6	Maria González (1:01.37); Byanca Rodriguez (1:09.09); Ana Sofia Revilak (1:01.13); Liliana Ibáñez (56.67)	Mexico	4:08.26	NR
6	7	Carla González (1:04.54); Mercedes Toledo (1:11.81); Isabella Paez (1:01.18); Arlene Semeco (56.35)	Venezuela	4:13.88	NR
7	1	Danielle Boothe (1:05.89); Alia Atkinson (1:07.05); Trudian Patrick (1:04.30); Breanna Roman (57.34)	Jamaica	4:14.58	
8	8	McKenna DeBever (1:04.92); Paula Tamashiro (1:13.61); Andrea Cedrón (1:05.81); Jessica Cattaneo (58.15)	Peru	4:22.49	NR
