= Margo Geer =

American swimmer (born 1992)

Personal information
- National team: United States
- Born: March 17, 1992 (age 34) Milford Center, Ohio, U.S.
- Height: 6 ft 0 in (183 cm)
- Weight: 152 lb (69 kg)

Sport
- Sport: Swimming
- Strokes: Freestyle
- Club: Tucson Ford Dealers Aquatics
- College team: University of Arizona
Medal record
Women's swimming
Representing the United States
World Championships (LC)
Gold medal – first place	2015 Kazan	4×100 m mixed freestyle
Silver medal – second place	2015 Kazan	4×100 m mixed medley
Silver medal – second place	2019 Gwangju	4×100 m freestyle
Bronze medal – third place	2015 Kazan	4×100 m freestyle
Pan Pacific Championships
Silver medal – second place	2018 Tokyo	4×100 m freestyle
Pan American Games
Gold medal – first place	2019 Lima	100 m freestyle
Gold medal – first place	2019 Lima	4×100 m freestyle
Gold medal – first place	2019 Lima	4×100 m medley
Gold medal – first place	2019 Lima	4×100 m mixed freestyle
Silver medal – second place	2019 Lima	50 m freestyle

Margo Geer (born March 17, 1992) is an American competition swimmer specializing in sprint freestyle. She is the current head coach of the University of Alabama’s men’s and women’s programs as of August 2021 following her bid for the Olympic Games.

== Early life ==
Geer began swimming at the Springfield YMCA (SPY) in Springfield, Ohio under coaches Dave Johnson, Mickey McNeil and John Bishop at just four years old. She later swam for Fairbanks High School. She graduated the University of Arizona in 2014. Geer was a volunteer swim coach at Ohio State University during their 2016–17 season. She is an American competitive swimmer who specializes in freestyle events.

== Career ==
Geer attended the University of Arizona, where she swam for the Arizona Wildcats swimming and diving team. She was a three-time NCAA National Champion (50-yard freestyle in 2013; 100-yard freestyle in 2013 and 2014). She was also named the 2015 Pac-12 Woman of the Year. She represented the United States at the 2015 World Aquatics Championships where she won a gold medal swimming for the first-place U.S. team in the preliminary heats of the 4×100-meter mixed freestyle relay, a silver medal in the 4 × 100 m mixed medley relay, and a bronze medal in the 4×100-meter freestyle relay. After her collegiate career, she competed at the 2008, 2012, and 2016 Olympic Trials, where she finished fifth in 2012.

== Personal Life ==
Geer is married to University of Alabama philosophy professor Eric Solis.
