= Swimming at the 2019 Pan American Games – Women's 100 metre freestyle =

Women's 100 metre freestyle at the 2019 Pan American Games
- Venue: Villa Deportiva Nacional, VIDENA
- Dates: August 8 (preliminaries and finals)
- Competitors: 28 from 24 nations
- Winning time: 54.17

Medalists
Gold medal	Margo Geer	United States
Silver medal	Alexia Zevnik	Canada
Bronze medal	Larissa Oliveira	Brazil

The women's 100 metre freestyle competition of the swimming events at the 2019 Pan American Games was held on 8 August 2019 at the Villa Deportiva Nacional Videna cluster.

== Records ==
Prior to this competition, the existing world and Pan American Games records were as follows:

World Record	Sarah Sjöström (SWE)	51.71	Budapest, Hungary	July 23, 2017
Pan American Games record	Chantal van Landeghem (CAN)	53.83	Toronto, Canada	July 14, 2015

== Results ==
KEY:	q	Fastest non-qualifiers	Q	Qualified	GR	Games record	NR	National record	PB	Personal best	SB	Seasonal best

=== Heats ===
The first round was held on August 8.

Rank	Heat	Lane	Name	Nationality	Time	Notes
1	4	4	Margo Geer	United States	54.65	QA
2	4	5	Alexia Zevnik	Canada	55.36	QA
3	2	5	Alyson Ackman	Canada	55.78	QA
4	2	4	Larissa Oliveira	Brazil	56.02	QA
5	3	4	Lia Neal	United States	56.49	QA
6	3	5	Daynara de Paula	Brazil	56.65	QA
7	4	3	Elisbet Gámez Matos	Cuba	57.03	QA
8	2	3	Karen Torrez	Bolivia	57.19	QA
9	3	6	Allyson Ponson	Aruba	57.28	QB
10	1	5	Sirena Rowe	Colombia	57.48	QB
11	4	6	Anicka Delgado	Ecuador	57.51	QB
12	3	3	Jeserik Pinto	Venezuela	57.57	WD
13	4	8	Inés Marín	Chile	58.08	QB
14	4	2	Julimar Avila	Honduras	58.15	QB
15	3	2	Emily MacDonald	Jamaica	58.19	QB
16	2	6	María Mejia	Guatemala	58.57	QB
17	2	2	Madelyn Moore	Bermuda	59.02	QB
18	3	8	Jessica Cattaneo	Peru	59.05	
19	2	1	Rafaela Fernandini	Peru	59.31	
20	2	8	Lillian Higgs	Bahamas	59.32	
20	3	7	Maria Schutzmeier	Nicaragua	59.32	
22	4	7	Giselle Gursoy	Trinidad and Tobago	59.34	
23	3	1	Catharine Cooper	Panama	59.66	
24	2	7	Inés Remersaro	Uruguay	59.69	
25	4	1	Lauren Hew	Cayman Islands	1:01.38	
26	1	5	Mya de Freitas	Saint Vincent and the Grenadines	1:03.49	
27	1	4	Bianca Mitchell	Antigua and Barbuda	1:04.21	
28	1	3	Nikita Fiedtkou	Guyana	1:06.07	

=== Final B ===
The b final was also held on August 8.

Rank	Lane	Name	Nationality	Time	Notes
9	4	Allyson Ponson	Aruba	57.06	
10	3	Anicka Delgado	Ecuador	57.13	
11	5	Sirena Rowe	Colombia	57.64	
12	2	Julimar Avila	Honduras	57.74	NR
13	6	Inés Marín	Chile	57.89	
14	1	María Mejia	Guatemala	57.94	
15	7	Emily MacDonald	Jamaica	58.07	
16	8	Madelyn Moore	Bermuda	58.68	

=== Final A ===
The A final was also held on August 8.

Rank	Lane	Name	Nationality	Time	Notes
1st place, gold medalist(s)	4	Margo Geer	United States	54.17	
2nd place, silver medalist(s)	5	Alexia Zevnik	Canada	55.04	
3rd place, bronze medalist(s)	6	Larissa Oliveira	Brazil	55.25	
4	2	Lia Neal	United States	55.62	
5	3	Alyson Ackman	Canada	55.81	
6	8	Karen Torrez	Bolivia	56.59	
7	7	Daynara de Paula	Brazil	56.88	
8	1	Elisbet Gámez Matos	Cuba	57.05	
