= Katie Meili =

American swimmer (born 1991)

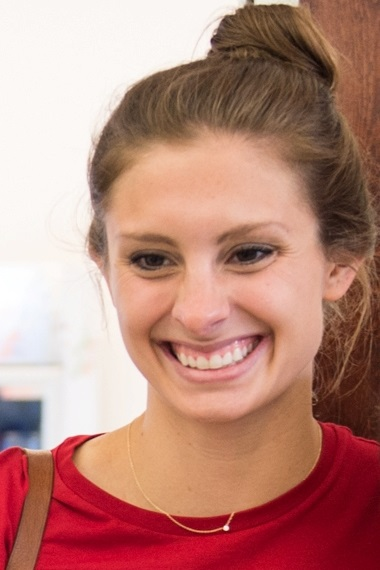

Personal information
- Full name: Catherine Michelle Meili
- Nickname: Katie
- National team: United States
- Born: April 16, 1991 (age 35) Carrollton, Texas, U.S.
- Height: 5 ft 7 in (170 cm)
- Weight: 135 lb (61 kg)

Sport
- Sport: Swimming
- Strokes: Breaststroke, freestyle, individual medley
- Club: SwimMAC Carolina
- College team: Columbia University
Medal record
Women's swimming
Representing United States
Event	1st	2nd	3rd
Summer Olympics	1	0	1
World Championships	1	1	1
World Championships (SC)	3	1	0
Pan American Games	2	1	0
Total	7	3	2
Summer Olympics
Gold medal – first place	2016 Rio de Janeiro	4×100 m medley
Bronze medal – third place	2016 Rio de Janeiro	100 m breaststroke
World Championships (LC)
Gold medal – first place	2017 Budapest	4×100 m medley
Silver medal – second place	2017 Budapest	100 m breaststroke
Bronze medal – third place	2017 Budapest	50 m breaststroke
World Championships (SC)
Gold medal – first place	2018 Hangzhou	4×50 m medley
Gold medal – first place	2018 Hangzhou	4×100 m medley
Gold medal – first place	2018 Hangzhou	4×50 m mixed medley
Silver medal – second place	2018 Hangzhou	100 m breaststroke
Pan American Games
Gold medal – first place	2015 Toronto	100 m breaststroke
Gold medal – first place	2015 Toronto	4×100 m medley
Silver medal – second place	2015 Toronto	4×100 m freestyle

Catherine Michelle "Katie" Meili (born April 16, 1991) is a former American competitive swimmer, who won a bronze medal at the 2016 Summer Olympics in the 100 meter breaststroke and a gold medal for swimming the preliminary heats of the 4 × 100-meter medley relay. In 2020, Meili joined USA Swimming Board of Directors for a four-year term as their Athlete Representative.

== Personal life ==
Meili was born in Carrollton, Texas, and her hometown is Colleyville, Texas. She graduated from Nolan Catholic High School in 2009 and Columbia University in 2013. As of 2019 she attends Georgetown Law School and is an assistant coach for their swim team. On July 8, 2019 she officially announced her retirement from competitive swimming.

== Career ==
=== 2014-2015 ===
In 2014, Meili won the 100-yard freestyle and 200-yard individual medley events at the short-course winter national championships in Greensboro, North Carolina. At the 2015 US Nationals in San Antonio, Texas, she won her first long-course national title, in the 100-meter breaststroke. At the 2015 Pan American Games in Toronto, Canada, she won the gold medal in the 100-meter breaststroke. In the heats she broke the Pan Am Games record with a time of 1:05.64. At the Duel in the Pool meet in December 2015, she broke the world record in the 4×100-meter medley relay (short course) together with her teammates Courtney Bartholomew, Kelsi Worrell, and Simone Manuel.

=== 2016 Summer Olympics ===
In 2016, Meili placed second in the 100-meter breaststroke at the US Olympic Trials and qualified for the US Olympic team for the 2016 Summer Olympics in Rio de Janeiro, Brazil. At the Olympics, she touched third in the 100-meter breaststroke behind Lilly King and Yuliya Yefimova, earning her the bronze medal. She also swam the breaststroke leg of the 4 × 100-meter medley relay in the preliminary heats, splitting a quick 1:04.93, to help the US qualify for the final. She earned a gold medal when the US team won in the finals.

=== 2017 World Championships ===
At the 2017 World Aquatics Championships, Meili won silver in the 100-meter breaststroke with a personal best time of 1:05.03, two-hundredths of a second ahead of third-place finisher Yefimova. She swam the breaststroke leg of the Women's 4x100-meter medley relay in the prelims, earning a gold medal when the US team won in the finals.

== Personal best times ==
Event	Time	Location	Date	Notes
50 m breaststroke	29.99	Budapest	July 30, 2017	
100 m breaststroke	1:05.03	Budapest	July 25, 2017	
200 m breaststroke	2:23.69	Austin	January 15, 2016	

=== USA swimming ===
In 2020, Meili joined USA Swimming Board of Directors for a four-year term as their Athlete Representative.
