= Alexia Zevnik =

Canadian swimmer (born 1994)

Personal information
- National team: Canada
- Born: March 4, 1994 (age 32) Montreal, Quebec
- Height: 185 cm (6 ft 1 in)

Sport
- Sport: Swimming
- Strokes: Freestyle, Backstroke
- College team: NC State
- Coach: Braden Holloway
Medal record
Women's swimming
Representing Canada
World Championships (SC)
Gold medal – first place	2016 Windsor	4×50 m freestyle
Gold medal – first place	2016 Windsor	4×200 m freestyle
Bronze medal – third place	2016 Windsor	4×50 m mixed freestyle
Pan Pacific Championships
Bronze medal – third place	2018 Tokyo	4×100 m freestyle
Commonwealth Games
Silver medal – second place	2018 Gold Coast	4×100 m freestyle
Pan American Games
Silver medal – second place	2019 Lima	100 m freestyle
Silver medal – second place	2019 Lima	4×100 m medley
Silver medal – second place	2019 Lima	4×100 m mixed medley
Bronze medal – third place	2019 Lima	4×100 m freestyle
Summer Universiade
Gold medal – first place	2017 Taipei	4×100 m freestyle
Silver medal – second place	2017 Taipei	200 m backstroke

Alexia Zevnik (born March 4, 1994) is a Canadian swimmer specializing in freestyle and backstroke. She placed second behind Sian Whittaker in the 200 m backstroke at the 2017 Summer Universiade in Taipei. At the 2018 Commonwealth Games, she led her team of Kayla Sanchez, Penny Oleksiak, and Taylor Ruck to a second-place finish in the 4x100 metre freestyle relay.
