= Mallory Comerford =

American swimmer (born 1997)

Personal information
- Nickname: Mal
- Nationality: American
- Born: September 6, 1997 (age 29) Kalamazoo, Michigan, U.S.
- Height: 5 ft 9 in (175.3 cm)
- Weight: 130 lb (60 kg)

Sport
- Sport: Swimming
- Strokes: Freestyle, butterfly
- Club: Cali Condors; Cardinal Aquatics
- College team: University of Louisville
- Coach: Arthur Albiero (Louisville)
Medal record
Women's swimming
Representing the United States
World Championships (LC)
Gold medal – first place	2017 Budapest	4×100 m freestyle
Gold medal – first place	2017 Budapest	4×200 m freestyle
Gold medal – first place	2017 Budapest	4×100 m medley
Gold medal – first place	2017 Budapest	4×100 m mixed freestyle
Gold medal – first place	2017 Budapest	4×100 m mixed medley
Gold medal – first place	2019 Gwangju	4×100 m medley
Gold medal – first place	2019 Gwangju	4×100 m mixed freestyle
Silver medal – second place	2019 Gwangju	4×100 m freestyle
Silver medal – second place	2019 Gwangju	4×100 m mixed medley
Bronze medal – third place	2022 Budapest	4×100 m freestyle
World Championships (SC)
Gold medal – first place	2016 Windsor	4×100 m freestyle
Gold medal – first place	2016 Windsor	4×100 m medley
Gold medal – first place	2018 Hangzhou	4×50 m freestyle
Gold medal – first place	2018 Hangzhou	4×100 m freestyle
Gold medal – first place	2018 Hangzhou	4×50 m medley
Gold medal – first place	2018 Hangzhou	4×100 m medley
Gold medal – first place	2018 Hangzhou	4×50 m mixed freestyle
Silver medal – second place	2016 Windsor	4×200 m freestyle
Silver medal – second place	2018 Hangzhou	200 m freestyle
Silver medal – second place	2018 Hangzhou	4×200 m freestyle
Bronze medal – third place	2018 Hangzhou	100 m freestyle
Pan Pacific Championships
Silver medal – second place	2018 Tokyo	4×100 m freestyle

Mallory Burckle (née Comerford; born September 6, 1997) is an American competitive swimmer specializing in freestyle events. Comerford was the winner of five gold medals at the 2017 World Aquatics Championships. She won USA Swimming's Golden Goggle Award for Breakout Performer of the Year for 2017. The following year, Comerford won eight medals in individual and relay events at the 2018 World Swimming Championships.

She is a member of the Cali Condors swim team, which is part of the International Swimming League. In college she swam for the University of Louisville under Head Coach Arthur Albiero.

== Career ==
=== International Swimming League ===
In 2019, she was a member of the inaugural International Swimming League representing the Cali Condors, who finished third place in the final match in Las Vegas, Nevada in December. Mallory had success as a part of many Condors relays, including the 400-meter medley relay which never lost all season.

=== 2016 ===
In December 2016 at the World short course championships in Windsor, Canada, Comerford finished 5th in the 200 meter freestyle, and won two gold medals and one silver medal in relays.

=== 2017 ===
At the 2017 NCAA Championships, she won the 200 yards freestyle in a time of 1:40.36, tied with Katie Ledecky.

At the 2017 U.S. Nationals, she won the gold medal in the 100 meter freestyle in a new US Open record of 52.81, and also qualified for the 2017 World Aquatics Championships.

Comerford won her first long-course world title at the 2017 World Aquatics Championships in Budapest, Hungary, in the 4 × 100 m freestyle relay. She swam a national record in the individual 100 meter freestyle of 52.59 on the first leg. She went on to win a gold medal in each of the five available relays – three women's relays and two mixed relays. In the 4 × 100 meter mixed freestyle relay, Comerford and her teammates Caeleb Dressel, Nathan Adrian, and Simone Manuel broke the world record with a time of 3:19.60.

=== 2018 World Championships ===
Comerford won a total of eight medals, 5 gold medals, 3 silver medals, and one bronze medal, spanning both individual and relay events at the 2018 World Swimming Championships in Hangzhou, China in December 2018.

=== 2019 ===
At the 2019 World Aquatics Championships, Comerford placed seventh in the 100m freestyle, and (with Zach Apple, Caeleb Dressel, and Simone Manuel) won the gold medal in the 4 x 100 mixed freestyle relay.

== Awards and honors ==
- Golden Goggle Award Breakout Performer of the Year: 2017
