= Holly Barratt =

Australian swimmer

Personal information
- Nationality: Australian
- Born: 1 January 1988 (age 38)

Sport
- Sport: Swimming
Medal record
Representing Australia
World Championships (LC)
Bronze medal – third place	2017 Budapest	4×100 m medley
World Championships (SC)
Silver medal – second place	2018 Hangzhou	50 m butterfly
Bronze medal – third place	2018 Hangzhou	50 m backstroke
Bronze medal – third place	2018 Hangzhou	4×50 m freestyle
Commonwealth Games
Silver medal – second place	2018 Gold Coast	50 m butterfly
Silver medal – second place	2022 Birmingham	50 m butterfly
Universiade
Gold medal – first place	2015 Gwangju	50 m backstroke
Bronze medal – third place	2015 Gwangju	50 m butterfly
Bronze medal – third place	2015 Gwangju	50 m freestyle

Holly Barratt (born 1 January 1988) is an Australian swimmer. She competed in the women's 50 metre backstroke event at the 2017 World Aquatics Championships.
