= Madison Kennedy =

American swimmer (born 1987)

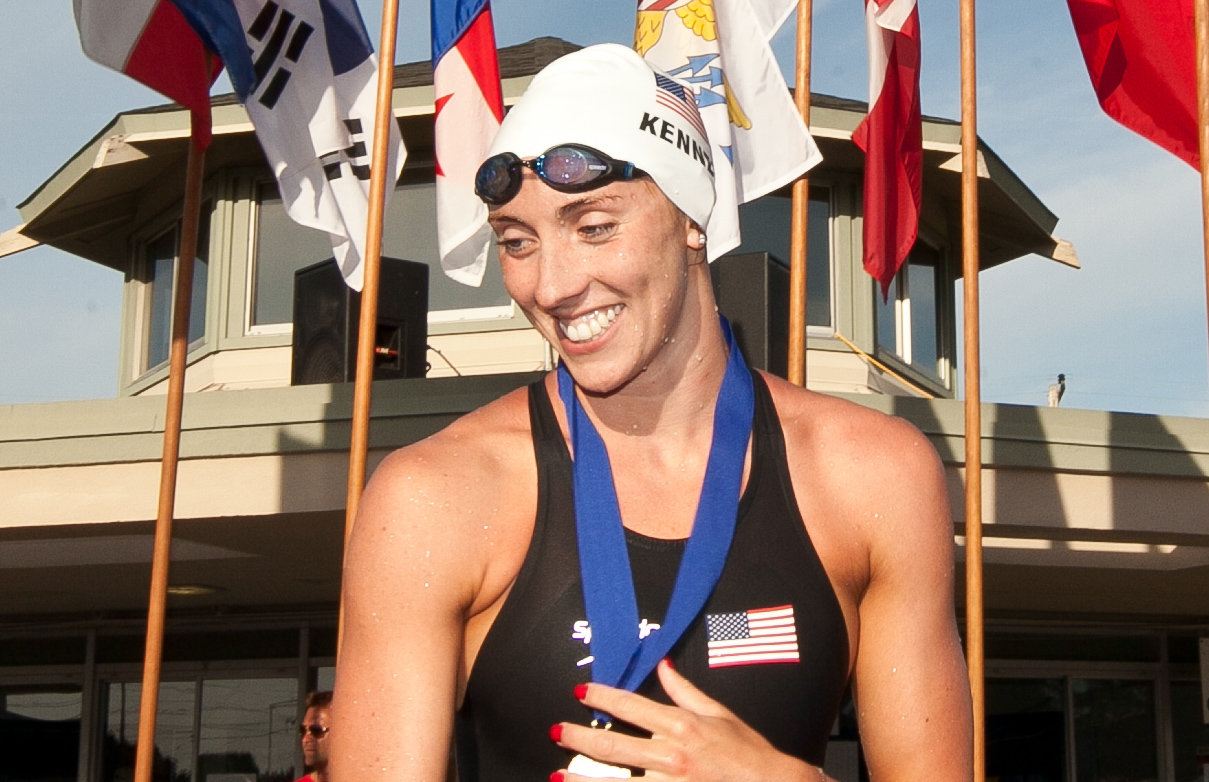
- Kennedy at the 2011 Santa Clara Grand Invitational

Personal information
- Nationality: United States
- Born: December 22, 1987 (age 38) Avon, Connecticut, U.S.
- Home town: Charlotte, North Carolina, U.S.
- Height: 6 ft 0 in (183 cm)
- Weight: 150 lb (68 kg)
- Spouse: Eric

Sport
- Sport: Swimming
- Events: 50, 100, 200 Freestyle; Freestyle relays
- Strokes: freestyle
- Club: SwimMAC Carolina; US National Team; DC Trident
- College team: Rutgers University; University of California, Berkeley
- Coach: Teri McKeever (U. Cal. Berkeley); David Marsh (SwimMAC) Carolina; Self Coached
Medal record
Women's swimming
Representing the United States
World Championships (SC)
Gold medal – first place	2016 Windsor	4×100 m freestyle
Gold medal – first place	2018 Hangzhou	4×50 m freestyle
Gold medal – first place	2018 Hangzhou	4×50 m mixed freestyle
Bronze medal – third place	2016 Windsor	50 m freestyle
Pan American Games
Gold medal – first place	2019 Lima	4×100 m mixed freestyle

Madison Kennedy (born December 22, 1987) is an American former competitive swimmer who specialized in sprint freestyle events and competed for Rutgers University and the University of California Berkeley. An exceptional national and international competitor, she has won medals at the 2010 and 2011 U.S. Nationals, the 2011, 2015, and 2019 Pan American Games, the 2014, 2016 and 2018 Short Course World Championships, and the 2009 World University Games. She is a World Record holder in the 4×50 meter freestyle relay.

== Early life ==
Kennedy was born December 22, 1987 one of three sisters to Jordana and James Kennedy in Avon, Connecticut. She attended Connecticut's Avon High School, graduating in 2005. As an Avon High Falcon swimmer, she was voted All American five times by the National Interscholastic Swimming Coaches Association (NISCA) in 2003 in the 100 and 50-yard freestyles and in 2004 in the 100, 200 and 50-yard freestyles, and the 200 individual medley. She set Avon High School records in the 100 butterfly, 100 backstroke, and the 200, 50 and 100 freestyle events, several of which still hold.

== College ==
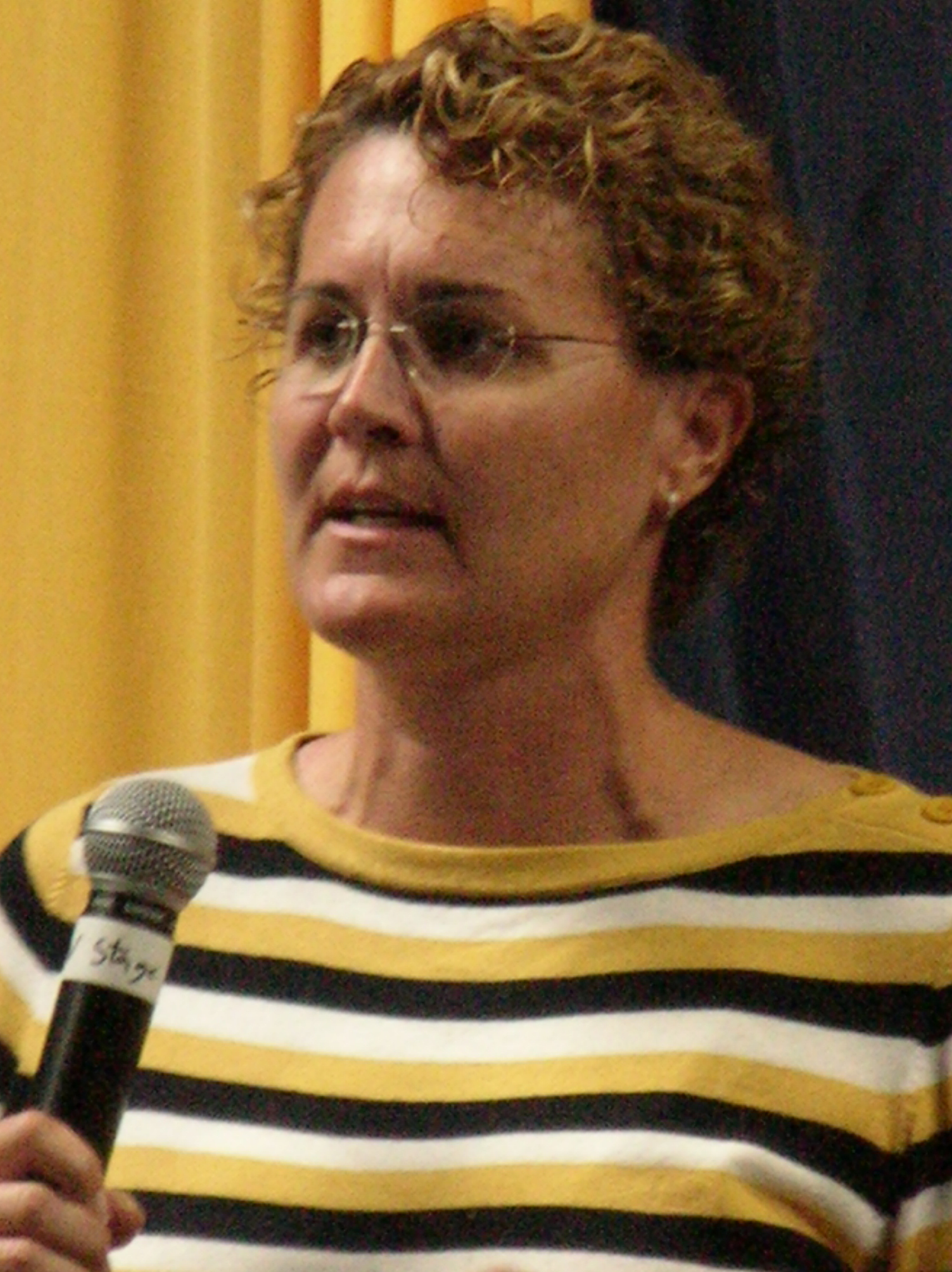
T. McKeever, 2009

She attended and swam for Rutgers University for two years. As a Freshman at Rutgers from 2005-6, she was a recipient of five honorable mention All American honors in the 50 and 100 freestyle, and the 800, 400, and 200 freestyle relays. After her Sophomore year, she transferred to the University of California Berkeley, graduating in 2010 with a Psychology major. At Berkeley, she was managed by long serving Coach Teri McKeever who directed the Cal women from 1993 until 2023. Kennedy held the Cal Berkeley's sixth best all-time performance for the 100-yard freestyle with a time of 48.18. She set a new school record for the 50-yard freestyle of 21.87, in the 2008 NCAA championship preliminaries. Helping to lead Berkeley to a 2009 NCAA National Team Championshp, she won All American honors in the 50 and 200-yard freestyle and honorable mention in the 100-freestyle.

== SwimMAC Carolina ==
After collegiate competition, she swam with SwimMAC Carolina in Charlotte, North Carolina, where she was trained by Hall of Fame Coach David Marsh of Auburn University. During the post-college portion of her ten-year career training and competiting with the U.S. National team, including her time training and competing for her national and international medals, she was with SwimMAC Carolina. She has continued to live in Charleston, South Carolina, with husband Eric.

== Competition highlights ==
She won a gold medal at the 2015 US Nationals in the 50m freestyle, and silver in 2010 and 2011. She has competed at the US Olympic Swimming Trials in 2008, 2012, and 2016. As shown with more detail in the Medals Record Pull-down on the information box at right, she competed in the 2011 Pan American games, won a silver medal at the 2015 Pan American Games, a gold in the 2019 Pan American games, multiple medals including three gold and a bronze at the 2014, 2016, and 2018 SC World Championships, and two gold medals at the 2009 World University Games.

== 2008 U.S. Olympic trials ==
Kennedy made the semifinals of the 2008 U.S. Olympics trials, recording a 25.39 in the 50-meter freestyle, placing ninth, and again made the semi-finals in the 100-meter freestyle, recording a 55.28, placing 13th.

== 2016 Olympic trials ==
In 2016, she was the fastest swimmer in the Women's 50m freestyle during the prelims at the US Olympic Trials, and placed third in the 50-meter freestyle, her highest trial finish. She came into the trials that year as the top seed, though she did not qualify for the U.S. team.

== Honors ==
She is a member of the Avon High School Falcons Hall of Fame.

In the professional ranks, she represented DC Trident at the International Swimming League from at least 2019-2021.
