= Seraina Sturzenegger =

Swiss swimmer

Personal information
- Nationality: Swiss
- Born: 25 September 1997 (age 28)

Sport
- Sport: Swimming

Seraina Sturzenegger (born 25 September 1997) is a Swiss swimmer. She competed in the women's 50 metre backstroke event at the 2018 FINA World Swimming Championships (25 m), in Hangzhou, China.
