= Wu Yue (swimmer) =

Chinese swimmer (born 1997)

Personal information
- Nationality: Chinese
- Born: 8 October 1997 (age 28)

Sport
- Sport: Swimming
- Strokes: Freestyle
Medal record
Women's swimming
Representing China
World Championships (SC)
Silver medal – second place	2018 Hangzhou	4×50 m medley
Asian Games
Gold medal – first place	2018 Jakarta	4×200 m freestyle
Silver medal – second place	2018 Jakarta	4×100 m freestyle

Wu Yue (born 8 October 1997) is a Chinese swimmer. She competed in the women's 4 × 100 metre freestyle relay event at the 2018 Asian Games, winning the silver medal.
