= Nathalie Lindborg =

Swedish swimmer

Personal information
- Nationality: Swedish
- Born: 15 April 1991 (age 35)

Sport
- Sport: Swimming
Medal record
European Championships (SC)
Silver medal – second place	2017 Copenhagen	4×50 m freestyle

Nathalie Lindborg (born 15 April 1991) is a Swedish freestyle swimmer. She competed in the women's 4 × 100 metre freestyle relay event at the 2017 World Aquatics Championships.
