= Brittany Elmslie =

Australian swimmer

Personal information
- Full name: Brittany Joyce Elmslie
- Nicknames: "Brit", "Britty", "Bidz"
- National team: Australia
- Born: 19 June 1994 (age 32) Nambour, Queensland
- Height: 180 cm (5 ft 11 in)
- Weight: 73 kg (161 lb)

Sport
- Sport: Swimming
- Strokes: Freestyle, butterfly, medley
- Club: Marion
- Coach: Peter Bishop
Medal record
Women's swimming
Representing Australia
Event	1st	2nd	3rd
Olympic Games	2	3	0
World Championships (LC)	0	3	0
World Championships (SC)	1	0	1
Pan Pacific Championships	1	1	0
Commonwealth Games	2	1	0
Total	6	8	1
Olympic Games
Gold medal – first place	2012 London	4×100 m freestyle
Gold medal – first place	2016 Rio de Janeiro	4×100 m freestyle
Silver medal – second place	2012 London	4×200 m freestyle
Silver medal – second place	2012 London	4×100 m medley
Silver medal – second place	2016 Rio de Janeiro	4×100 m medley
World Championships (LC)
Silver medal – second place	2013 Barcelona	4×100 m freestyle
Silver medal – second place	2013 Barcelona	4×200 m freestyle
Silver medal – second place	2017 Budapest	4x100 m freestyle
World Championships (SC)
Gold medal – first place	2016 Windsor	100 m freestyle
Bronze medal – third place	2016 Windsor	4x100 m medley
Pan Pacific Championships
Gold medal – first place	2014 Gold Coast	4×100 m freestyle
Silver medal – second place	2014 Gold Coast	4×200 m freestyle
Commonwealth Games
Gold medal – first place	2014 Glasgow	4×100 m freestyle
Gold medal – first place	2014 Glasgow	4×200 m freestyle
Bronze medal – third place	2014 Glasgow	50 m butterfly

Brittany Joyce Elmslie, OAM (born 19 June 1994) is an Australian former competitive swimmer. She represented Australia at the 2012 and 2016 Summer Olympics in swimming, and won a gold medal in the 4 × 100 m freestyle relay at both Games.

== Personal life ==
Elmslie was born in Nambour, Queensland. She was named a 2011–2012 YoungStar Sport Award winner for the Northside Chronicle. As of 2012, she lives in Brisbane, having moved there from Noosa (where she attended Good Shepherd Lutheran College) in 2011 in order to improve her chances of making the Olympics. In 2011 she completed her final year of school at St Margaret's Anglican Girls' School.

Elmslie is 179 centimetres (5 ft 10 in) tall and weighs 73 kilograms (161 lb).

Elmslie initially studied Business at Griffith University, majoring in Events and Sports Management. She subsequently changed her academic major to Media and Communications at Flinders University.

On June 2, 2020, Elmslie attributed her retirement from competitive swimming, to her own self-reflection after she did not qualify for the 2018 Commonwealth Games, and self-realisation at the finals of the 2019 Australian Swimming Championships in Adelaide, that she was keen on moving on from competitive swimming. Elmslie is currently mentoring young, aspiring athletes, promoting self-evaluation and sharing thought processes of elite athletes, through swimming programs, one-on-one coaching and technique efficiency coaching, conducted by her own business – Golden Perspective.

== Swimming ==
Elmslie's best time in the 100-metre freestyle is 53.54 seconds and was set at the 2016 Hancock Prospecting Australian Swimming Championships. Her best time in the 50-metre freestyle is 24.74 seconds, set at the 2016 Swimming Australia Grand Prix. Her best time in the 200-metre freestyle is 1:56.79, set at the 2014 McDonald's Queensland Championships. Her best time in the 100-metre butterfly is 57.97 seconds set at the 2015 Australian Swimming Championships. She is a member of Brisbane Grammar School Swimming Club.

At the Guam hosted 2009 Junior Pan Pacific, Elmslie finished first in the 50-metre freestyle and fourth in the 100-metre freestyle. At the 2010 Telstra Australian Swimming Championships, she made the finals in the 50-metre freestyle. At the Hawaii hosted 2010 Junior Pan Pacific, she finished third in the 4×100-metre freestyle and fifth in the 50-metre freestyle.

In 2011, after moving to Brisbane to join other swimmers coached by Matt Brown, Elmslie increased her training regime and lost 6 kilograms (13 lb). Her training partners included Emily Seebohm. At the 2012 Australian National Championships, she set a time of 1 minute 57.24 seconds in the 200-metre freestyle. She was selected to represent Australia at the 2012 Summer Olympics in the women's 4×200-metre freestyle swimming team event in her first Olympics. Going into the games, her team was considered a medal favourite. She was set to compete in the Olympics as a teenager.

At the 2012 Summer Olympics, Elmslie represented the gold medal-winning Australia team (with Cate Campbell, Alicia Coutts and Melanie Schlanger in the final) of the 4 × 100 metre freestyle relay, where the team set a then-Olympic Record of 3:33.15. Elmslie also won two silvers, as part of the Australian teams in the competitive heats of both the 4 × 100 metre medley relay and the 4 × 200 metre freestyle relay.

At the 2013 Australian Swimming Championships she won silver in the 100-metre butterfly and bronze 50-metre freestyle events, qualifying for the 2013 World Aquatics Championships. At the World Championships, she teamed up with Bronte Campbell, Emma McKeon and Emily Seebohm in the heats of the 4×100-metre freestyle relay, finishing second in their heat and overall. In the final sisters Cate and Bronte Campbell, Emma McKeon and Alicia Coutts won the silver medal, finishing 0.12 of a second behind the United States team.

At the 2016 Summer Olympics, Elmslie represented the gold medal-winning Australia team (with sisters Cate Campbell and Bronte Campbell and Emma McKeon in the final, along with Madison Wilson in the heats) of the 4 × 100 metre freestyle relay. In the final of the event, the Australian team set a then 4 × 100 metres freestyle relay World Record time of 3:30.65. Elmslie also won silver as part of the Australian team in the competitive heats of the 4 × 100 metre medley relay.

Elmslie did not qualify for the 2018 Commonwealth Games. On April 23, 2019, Elmslie announced her retirement from competitive swimming, on her personal Instagram page, at the age of 24.

== See also ==
- List of Olympic medalists in swimming (women)
- List of World Aquatics Championships medalists in swimming (women)
- List of Commonwealth Games medallists in swimming (women)
