= Maria Temnikova =

Russian swimmer

Personal information
- Native name: Мария Темникова
- Nationality: (Russia) Russian
- Born: 17 November 1995 (age 30) Yekaterinburg, Russia

Sport
- Sport: Swimming
- Strokes: Breaststroke
- Coach: Mikhail Gorelik
Medal record
Representing Russia
European Championships (SC)
Gold medal – first place	2019 Glasgow	200 m breaststroke
Silver medal – second place	2021 Kazan	200 m breaststroke
Summer Universiade
Bronze medal – third place	2017 Taipei	200 m breaststroke
European Junior Swimming Championships
Gold medal – first place	2011 Belgrade	200 m breaststroke

Maria Sergeyevna Temnikova (Russian: Мария Сергеевна Темникова) is a Russian swimmer. She won the gold medal at the 2019 European Short Course Swimming Championships in 200 m breaststroke.
