= Kim Busch =

Dutch swimmer (born 1998)

Personal information
- National team: Netherlands
- Born: 16 June 1998 (age 28) Dordrecht, Netherlands
- Height: 1.73 m (5 ft 8 in)
- Weight: 63 kg (139 lb)

Sport
- Sport: Swimming
- Strokes: Butterfly, freestyle
Medal record
Women's swimming
Representing the Netherlands
World Championships (LC)
Gold medal – first place	2024 Doha	4×100 m freestyle
Bronze medal – third place	2017 Budapest	4×100 m freestyle
World Championships (SC)
Silver medal – second place	2016 Windsor	4×50 m freestyle
Silver medal – second place	2016 Windsor	4×50 m mixed freestyle
Silver medal – second place	2018 Hangzhou	4×50 m freestyle
Silver medal – second place	2018 Hangzhou	4×100 m freestyle
Silver medal – second place	2018 Hangzhou	4×50 m mixed freestyle
Silver medal – second place	2018 Hangzhou	4×50 m mixed medley
Bronze medal – third place	2016 Windsor	4×100 m freestyle
Bronze medal – third place	2018 Hangzhou	4×50 m medley
Bronze medal – third place	2021 Abu Dhabi	4×50 m medley
Bronze medal – third place	2022 Melbourne	4×50 m freestyle
European Championships (LC)
Silver medal – second place	2018 Glasgow	4×100 m freestyle
Silver medal – second place	2020 Budapest	4×100 m freestyle
Silver medal – second place	2020 Budapest	4×100 m mixed freestyle
Bronze medal – third place	2022 Rome	4×100 m freestyle
European Championships (SC)
Gold medal – first place	2021 Kazan	4x50 m mixed freestyle
Silver medal – second place	2021 Kazan	4x50 m freestyle

Kim Busch (born 16 June 1998) is a Dutch competitive swimmer who specializes in freestyle and butterfly. As a member of the Dutch freestyle relay team she won silver in the 4×50 m event during the 2016 Short Course World Championships, and bronze in the 4 × 100 m event during the 2017 World Championships.

== Personal bests ==
Short course
Event	Time	Date	Location
50 m freestyle	23.99	2018-09-28	Budapest, Hungary
100 m freestyle	52.71	2018-11-03	Kristiansand, Norway
50 m breaststroke	30.10	2018-10-27	Aachen, Germany
50 m butterfly	25.62	2021-10-23	Amsterdam, Netherlands
100 m butterfly	57.09	2018-11-03	Kristiansand, Norway

Long course
Event	Time	Date	Location
50 m freestyle	24.67	2020-09-25	Eindhoven, Netherlands
100 m freestyle	54.05	2017-07-23	Budapest, Hungary
50 m breaststroke	31.22	2020-11-15	Eindhoven, Netherlands
50 m butterfly	26.04	2020-12-06	Rotterdam, Netherlands
100 m butterfly	59.12	2019-04-14	Eindhoven, Netherlands
