= Yui Yamane =

Japanese swimmer

Personal information
- Nationality: Japanese
- Born: 13 November 1994 (age 31)

Sport
- Sport: Swimming
- Strokes: freestyle
Medal record
Representing Japan
Summer Universiade
Silver medal – second place	2015 Gwangju	4x100m freestyle relay
Silver medal – second place	2015 Gwangju	4x100m medley relay
Bronze medal – third place	2015 Gwangju	4x200m freestyle relay

Yui Yamane (山根 優衣, Yamane Yui; born 13 November 1994) is a Japanese freestyle swimmer. She competed in the women's 4 × 100 metre freestyle relay event at the 2017 World Aquatics Championships.
