= Aela Janvier =

Canadian swimmer

Personal information
- Nationality: Canadian
- Born: 4 November 1999 (age 26)

Sport
- Sport: Swimming

Aela Janvier (born 4 November 1999) is a Canadian swimmer. She competed in the women's 200 metre backstroke event at the 2018 FINA World Swimming Championships (25 m), in Hangzhou, China.
