= Nastja Govejšek =

Slovenian swimmer

Personal information
- Nationality: SLO
- Born: 15 July 1997 (age 28) Celje, Slovenia
- Height: 1.7 m (5 ft 7 in)
- Weight: 55 kg (121 lb)

Sport
- Sport: Swimming
- Strokes: Freestyle
- College team: University of Louisville
Medal record
Nastja Govejšek
Medal record
Women's swimming
Representing Slovenia
European Championships (SC)
| Silver medal – second place | 2012 Chartres | 4×50 m mixed medley |
Youth Olympic Games
| Bronze medal – third place | 2014 Nanjing | 50 m butterfly |
European Junior Championships
| Bronze medal – third place | 2012 Antwerp | 50 m freestyle |
| Bronze medal – third place | 2013 Poznan | 50 m butterfly |

Nastja Govejšek is a Slovenian swimmer. Govejšek was born 15 July 1997 in Slovenia. At the 2012 Summer Olympics, she competed in the Women's 100 metre freestyle, finishing in 28th place overall in the heats, failing to qualify for the semifinals.
