= Sarah Gibson (swimmer) =

American swimmer (born 1995)

Personal information
- National team: United States
- Born: April 20, 1995 (age 31) Colorado Springs, Colorado, U.S.

Sport
- Sport: Swimming
- College team: Texas A&M University
Medal record
Women's swimming
Representing United States
World Championships (LC)
Gold medal – first place	2017 Budapest	4×100 m medley
Pan American Games
Gold medal – first place	2019 Lima	4×200 m freestyle
Gold medal – first place	2019 Lima	4×100 m medley
Bronze medal – third place	2019 Lima	100 m butterfly

Sarah Gibson (born April 20, 1995) is an American swimmer who completed her college career at Texas A&M University in 2017. She competed in the women's 100 metre butterfly event at the 2017 World Aquatics Championships.

Gibson, who grew up in San Antonio, was named the NCAA Division I Academic All-American across all Division I sports for the 2016–17 school year by the College Sports Information Directors of America.
