= Emi Moronuki =

Japanese swimmer

Personal information
- Nationality: Japanese
- Born: 22 October 1992 (age 33)

Sport
- Sport: Swimming

Emi Moronuki (born 22 October 1992) is a Japanese swimmer. She competed in the women's 50 metre backstroke event at the 2018 FINA World Swimming Championships (25 m), in Hangzhou, China.
