= Carla Buchanan =

Australian swimmer

Personal information
- Nationality: Australian
- Born: 31 July 1995 (age 30)

Sport
- Sport: Swimming

Carla Buchanan (born 31 July 1995) is an Australian swimmer. She competed in the women's 100 metre freestyle event at the 2018 FINA World Swimming Championships (25 m), in Hangzhou, China.
