= Kelsi Dahlia =

American swimmer (born 1994)

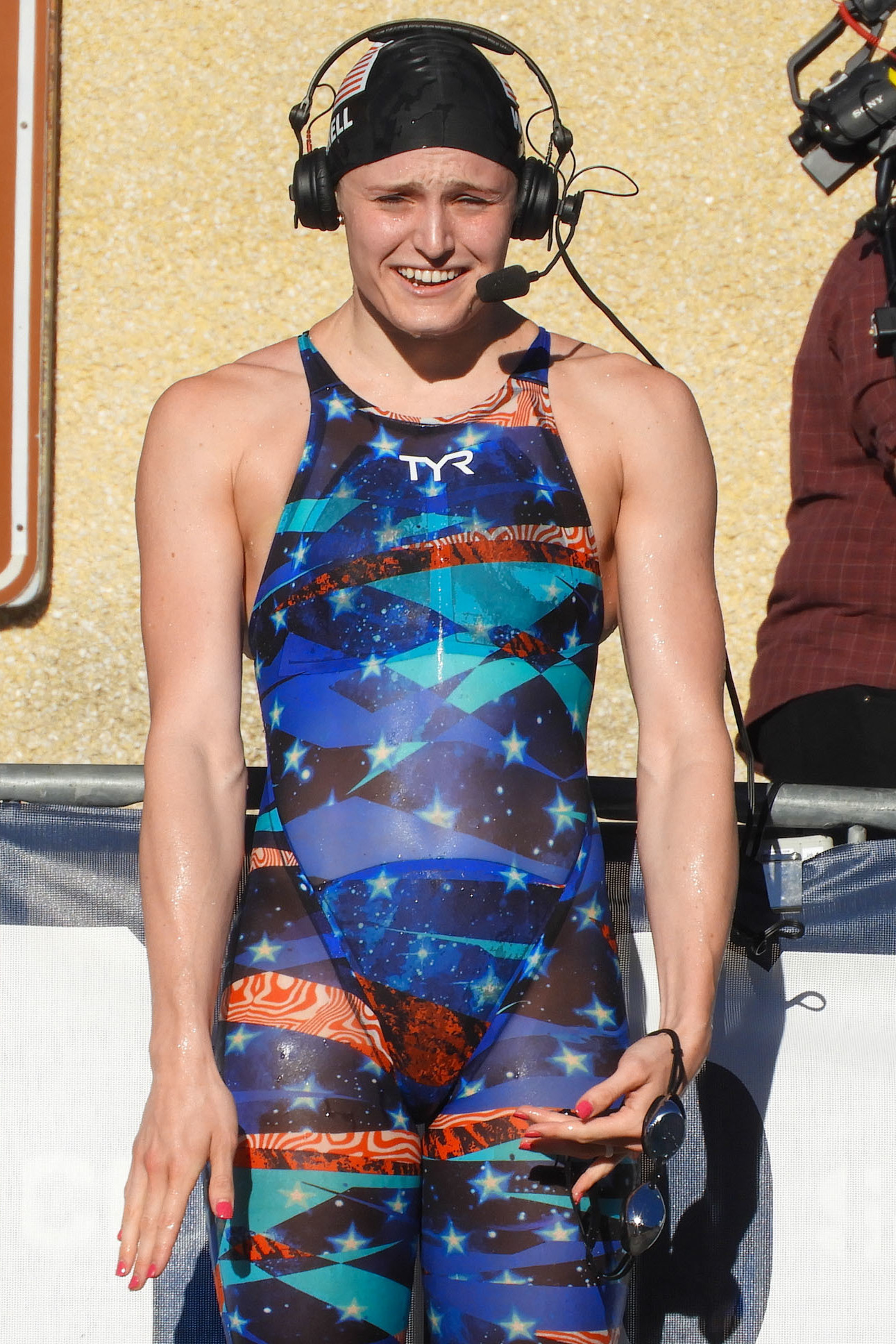
- Dahlia in 2017

Personal information
- Full name: Kelsi Worrell Dahlia
- Nationality: American
- Born: Kelsi Worrell; July 15, 1994 (age 32) Voorhees Township, New Jersey, U.S.
- Height: 5 ft 11 in (180 cm)
- Weight: 165 lb (75 kg)
- Spouse: Tom Dahlia (m. 2017)
- Relatives: Siblings: Kyle Worrell, Jarrod Worrell, Lindi Worrell, Taylor Worrell, Skylar Worrell

Sport
- Sport: Swimming
- Strokes: Butterfly, freestyle
- Club: Cali Condors; Cardinal Aquatics
- College team: University of Louisville
- Coach: Arthur Albiero (Louisville)
Medal record
Women's swimming
Representing the United States
Olympic Games
Gold medal – first place	2016 Rio de Janeiro	4×100 m medley
World Championships (LC)
Gold medal – first place	2017 Budapest	4×100 m freestyle
Gold medal – first place	2017 Budapest	4×100 m medley
Gold medal – first place	2017 Budapest	4×100 m mixed freestyle
Gold medal – first place	2017 Budapest	4×100 m mixed medley
Gold medal – first place	2019 Gwangju	4×100 m medley
Silver medal – second place	2019 Gwangju	4×100 m freestyle
Silver medal – second place	2019 Gwangju	4×100 m mixed medley
Bronze medal – third place	2017 Budapest	100 m butterfly
World Championships (SC)
Gold medal – first place	2016 Windsor	4×100 m freestyle
Gold medal – first place	2016 Windsor	4×50 m medley
Gold medal – first place	2016 Windsor	4×100 m medley
Gold medal – first place	2018 Hangzhou	100 m butterfly
Gold medal – first place	2018 Hangzhou	4×50 m freestyle
Gold medal – first place	2018 Hangzhou	4×100 m freestyle
Gold medal – first place	2018 Hangzhou	4×50 m medley
Gold medal – first place	2018 Hangzhou	4×100 m medley
Gold medal – first place	2018 Hangzhou	4×50 m mixed freestyle
Gold medal – first place	2018 Hangzhou	4×50 m mixed medley
Silver medal – second place	2016 Windsor	50 m butterfly
Silver medal – second place	2016 Windsor	100 m butterfly
Silver medal – second place	2016 Windsor	200 m butterfly
Silver medal – second place	2018 Hangzhou	200 m butterfly
Bronze medal – third place	2018 Hangzhou	50 m butterfly
Pan Pacific Championships
Silver medal – second place	2018 Tokyo	100 m butterfly
Silver medal – second place	2018 Tokyo	4×100 m freestyle
Silver medal – second place	2018 Tokyo	4×100 m medley
Pan American Games
Gold medal – first place	2015 Toronto	100 m butterfly
Gold medal – first place	2015 Toronto	4×100 m medley
Silver medal – second place	2015 Toronto	4×100 m freestyle
Representing the Louisville Cardinals
NCAA Championships
Gold medal – first place	2015 Greensboro	100 y butterfly
Gold medal – first place	2015 Greensboro	200 y butterfly
Gold medal – first place	2016 Atlanta	100 y butterfly
Gold medal – first place	2016 Atlanta	200 y butterfly
Silver medal – second place	2014 Minneapolis	100 y butterfly
Silver medal – second place	2015 Greensboro	4×50 y medley
Silver medal – second place	2016 Atlanta	4×100 y medley
Bronze medal – third place	2015 Greensboro	50 y freestyle
Bronze medal – third place	2016 Atlanta	4×50 y medley

Kelsi Worrell Dahlia (née Worrell; born July 15, 1994) is a former American competitive swimmer and 2016 Olympic champion in the 4x100 medley relay who swam for the University of Louisville and specialized in butterfly and freestyle events. At the 2018 World Championships, Dahlia won nine medals which included seven gold.

As part of the International Swimming League she competed for the Cali Condors.

== Early life and education ==
Born on July 15, 1994, to Bob and Erica Worrell in Voorhees Township, New Jersey, Dahlia grew up in Westampton Township, New Jersey where she swam for Tarnsfield Swim Club and Jersey Storm Swimming. At the Jersey Storm club, a highly competitive program, she was coached by Garrett Clark. She attended Rancocas Valley High School in Mount Holly, where she graduated as part of the class of 2012. As a Louisville senior, she won the Honda Sports Award in the swimming & diving category in 2016.

During her High School years, she earned All- American status in the 100-fly with a time of 54.93, the 100-back with a 56.81, and the 100-free with a 50.84. She was named Most Valuable Player of the Rancocas Valley High School Swim Team and was Burlington County Swimmer of the year for four consecutive years. She was a New Jersey state champion three times in the 100-fly, and also won the 100-free event. During her High School career, she was named New Jersey Swimmer of the Year and was a USA Swimming Scholastic All American.

== Swimming career ==
=== 2012–2014 ===
In 2012 Dahlia commenced at the University of Louisville, where she majored in Exercise Science. She was coached by Arthur Albiero and assistant coach Rachel Komisarz.

In March 2013, Dahlia competed at the NCAA Division I Championships in Indianapolis. She finished fourth in the 100 yd butterfly in a time of 51.80.

In March 2014, Dahlia competed at the NCAA Division I Championships in Minneapolis, Minnesota. She finished second in the 100 yd butterfly in a time of 51.09. She then swam the 200 yd butterfly, finishing fourth in a time of 1:53.63.

=== 2015 ===
In March 2015, Dahlia competed at the NCAA Division I Championships in Greensboro, North Carolina. She swam the second leg of the 200 yd freestyle relay, splitting 21.25; Louisville finished eighth in a time of 1:28.90. Dahlia then competed in the 50 yd freestyle, finishing third in a time of 21.62. She then swam in the 400 yd medley relay, splitting 50.09 on the butterfly leg; Louisville finished sixth in a time of 3:30.91. Dahlia's next event was the 200 yd medley relay, where she split 21.96 on the butterfly leg; Louisville finished second in a time of 1:35.75. Dahlia then swam in the 100 yd butterfly, where in the heats she went 49.89, breaking Natalie Coughlin's American and US Open record of 50.01 from 2002. In the final, Dahlia improved the mark to 49.81 to win the title. Her next event was the 200 yd butterfly, which she won in a time of 1:51.11.

Dahlia competed at the 2015 Pan American Games in Toronto. Her first event was the 100 m butterfly, where in the heats, she set a new games record of 57.24, surpassing the mark of 58.59 set by the US' Claire Donahue in 2011. In the final, Dahlia won the gold medal in a time of 57.78. She then competed in the 4 × 100 m medley relay. In the heats, she split 57.63 on the butterfly leg; the US qualified fastest for the final in a time of 3:57.35, a new games record. In the final, she split 57.34; the US won the gold medal in a games record time of 3:56.53.

In December 2015, Dahlia competed at the Duel in the Pool in Indianapolis, which was held in short course meters. She finished second in the 100 m butterfly in a time of 55.42, which broke Dana Vollmer's American record of 55.59 from 2010. She then swam in the 4 × 100 m medley relay, splitting 55.01 on the butterfly leg. The US finished first in a world record time of 3:45.20, surpassing the nation's own mark of 3:45.56 from 2011.

=== 2016 ===
In March 2016, Dahlia competed at the NCAA Division I Championships in Atlanta. She finished fourth in the 50 yd freestyle in a time of 21.75. She then swam in the 400 yd medley relay, splitting 49.31 on the butterfly leg; Louisville finished second in a time of 3:27.58. Dahlia then won the 100 yd butterfly in an American and US Open record time of 49.43. Her next event was the 200 yd medley relay, where she split 22.55 on the butterfly leg; Louisville finished third in a time of 1:35.36. She then competed in the 200 yd butterfly, where in the heats, she set a new meet record of 1:50.61. In the final, she won the title in a time of 1:50.96.

In August 2016, Dahlia competed at the Olympics in Rio de Janeiro. She placed ninth in the semifinals of the 100 m butterfly in a time of 57.54, 0.03 behind the eighth-place finisher. She then swam in the heats of the 4 × 100 m medley relay and was replaced by Vollmer in the final; the US eventually won the gold medal. Dahlia became the first University of Louisville swimmer to win an Olympic medal.

In December 2016, Dahlia competed at the World Championships (25 m) in Windsor, Ontario. Her first event was the 4 × 100 m freestyle relay. She split 53.04 on the second leg; the US won the gold medal in a time of 3:28.82. Dahlia then competed in the women's 4 × 50 m medley relay, splitting 24.44 on the butterfly leg; the US won the gold medal in a time of 1:43.27, breaking the world record of 1:44.04 set by Denmark in 2014. Dahlia then swam in the 200 m butterfly, winning the silver medal in a time of 2:02.89, breaking Cammile Adams' American record of 2:03.39 from 2015. She then swam in the mixed 4 × 50 m medley relay, splitting 24.59 on the butterfly leg; the US won the gold medal in a time of 1:37.22, breaking Brazil's championship record of 1:37.26 from 2014. Dahlia's next event was the 50 m butterfly, where she went 24.94 in the heats, breaking Christine Magnuson's American record of 25.65 from 2012. In the final, Dahlia won the silver medal in a time of 25.27. Her next event was the 4 × 50 m freestyle relay, in which she split 23.57 on the second leg; the US finished fourth in a time of 1:35.86. On the final day of competition, Dahlia swam in two events. First was the 100 m butterfly, where she won the silver medal in an American record time of 55.22. She then swam the butterfly leg of the 4 × 100 m medley relay, splitting 55.48; the US won the gold medal in a time of 3:47.89, breaking the championship record of 3:48.29 set by China in 2010.

=== 2017 ===
In July 2017, Dahlia competed at the World Championships in Budapest. Her first event was the women's 4 × 100 m freestyle relay, in which she split 53.16 on the second leg; the US won the gold medal in a time of 3:31.72, breaking the American record. She then swam in the 100 m butterfly, winning the bronze medal in a personal best time of 56.37. She then swam in the heats of the mixed 4 × 100 m medley relay, splitting 56.17 on the butterfly leg; the US qualified fastest in a world record time of 3:40.28, surpassing the mark of 3:41.71 set by Great Britain in 2015. Dahlia was replaced in the final, where the US broke the world record again to win the gold medal. She then swam in the heats of the mixed 4 × 100 m freestyle relay and was replaced in the final; the US eventually won the gold medal. Dahlia's final event was the women's 4 × 100 m medley relay, in which she split 56.30 on the butterfly leg; the US won the gold medal in a world record time of 3:51.55, breaking the nation's own mark of 3:52.05 from 2012.

=== 2018 ===
In August 2018, Dahlia competed at the Pan Pacific Championships in Tokyo. Her first event was the 100 m butterfly, in which she won the silver medal in a time of 56.44. She then competed in the 4 × 100 m freestyle relay, splitting 53.59 on the third leg; the US won the silver medal in a time of 3:33.45. Dahlia's final event was the women's 4 × 100 m medley relay, in which she split 56.72 on the butterfly leg; the US won the silver medal in a time of 3:53.21.

In December 2018, Dahlia competed at the World Championships (25 m) in Hangzhou. Her first event was the 4 × 100 m freestyle relay. She split 51.40 on the anchor leg; the US won the gold medal in an overall time of 3:27.78. Dahlia then competed in the women's 4 × 50 m medley relay, splitting 24.02 on the butterfly leg; the US won the gold medal in a world record time of 1:42.38. Dahlia then swam in the 200 m butterfly, winning the silver medal in an American record time of 2:01.73. She then swam in the mixed 4 × 50 m medley relay, splitting 24.71 on the butterfly leg; the US won the gold medal in a time of 1:36.40, breaking the nation's own world record of 1:37.17 from 2013. Dahlia's next event was the 50 m butterfly, where she won the bronze medal in a time of 24.97. Her next event was the 4 × 50 m freestyle relay, in which she split 23.37 on the third leg; the US won the gold medal in a time of 1:35.86. On the final day of competition, Dahlia swam in two events. First was the 100 m butterfly, where she won the gold medal in a time of 55.01. She then swam the butterfly leg of the 4 × 100 m medley relay, splitting 54.89; the US won the gold medal in a time of 3:45.58, setting a new championship record. Dahlia's nine medals was the most total medals won at a single FINA World Championships.

=== 2019 ===
In July 2019, Dahlia competed at the World Championships in Gwangju. Her first event was the 4 × 100 m freestyle relay, where she split 53.46 on the third leg; the US won the silver medal in an American record time of 3:31.02. The following day, Dahlia swam in the 100 m butterfly, finishing sixth in a time of 57.11. On day four, she swam in the heats of the mixed 4 × 100 m medley relay and was replaced in the final; the US eventually won the silver medal. On the final day, she swam in the women's 4 × 100 m medley relay, splitting 56.16 on the butterfly leg; the US won the gold medal in a world record time of 3:50.40.

Dahlia competed in the inaugural season of the International Swimming League (ISL), representing the Cali Condors, who finished third place in the final match in Las Vegas, Nevada in December. Dahlia won the 100 m butterfly at the final beating world record holder Sarah Sjöström for the second time of the season.

=== 2020–2022 ===
Dahlia competed in the second season of the ISL. In the final, she swam the butterfly leg of Cali Condors' 4 × 100 m medley relay, splitting 54.79. The final time was 3:44.52, which was ratified as a world record because all four relay swimmers were from the same nation. Dahlia held it until 2022.

In June 2021, Dahlia competed at the US Olympic trials in Omaha, Nebraska. She finished fourth in the 100 m butterfly in a time of 56.80 and did not qualify for the Olympic team.

Dahlia competed in the third and final season of the ISL. She went 54.59 in the 100 m butterfly, breaking the world record of 54.61 set by Sjöström in 2014. It stood until 2022.

In May 2022, Dahlia retired from swimming at the age of 27.

== Coaching ==
In June 2022, Dahlia was hired as an associate swimming coach for the University of Notre Dame. In the position she worked with Louisville associate Chris Lindauer, who had been hired in April 2022.

== Personal life ==
Dahlia was married in October 2017. She started competing under her married name in 2018.

== Awards and honors ==
- Honda Sports Award – Swimming & Diving (2015–16)
- Golden Goggle Awards – Relay Performance of the Year (2017, (Note: Joint winner alongside Kathleen Baker, Lilly King and Simone Manuel) 2019 (Note: Joint winner alongside Regan Smith, King and Manuel))

Records
Preceded by Sarah Sjöström	Women's 100 meter butterfly world record holder (short course); December 3, 2021 – December 18, 2022	Succeeded by Maggie Mac Neil
