= Zhu Menghui =

Chinese swimmer (born 1999)

Personal information
- Native name: 朱梦惠
- Nationality: Chinese
- Born: 23 March 1999 (age 27) Yuhuan, Taizhou, Zhejiang, China
- Height: 1.77 m (5 ft 10 in)
- Weight: 62 kg (137 lb)

Sport
- Sport: Swimming
- Strokes: Freestyle
Medal record
Women's swimming
Representing China
World Championships (LC)
Bronze medal – third place	2017 Budapest	4×100 m mixed medley
Bronze medal – third place	2023 Fukuoka	4×100 m freestyle
World Championships (SC)
Silver medal – second place	2018 Hangzhou	4×100 m medley
Bronze medal – third place	2018 Hangzhou	4×100 m freestyle
Bronze medal – third place	2021 Abu Dhabi	4×200 m freestyle
Asian Games
Gold medal – first place	2018 Jakarta	4×100 m mixed medley
Silver medal – second place	2018 Jakarta	100 m freestyle
Silver medal – second place	2018 Jakarta	4×100 m freestyle
Asian Championships
Gold medal – first place	2016 Tokyo	100 m freestyle
Gold medal – first place	2016 Tokyo	4×100 m freestyle
Silver medal – second place	2016 Tokyo	50 m freestyle
Silver medal – second place	2016 Tokyo	4×100 m medley
Junior Pan Pacific Championships
Silver medal – second place	2014 Maui	50 m freestyle
Bronze medal – third place	2014 Maui	100 m freestyle

Zhu Menghui (Chinese: 朱梦惠; born 23 March 1999) is a Chinese swimmer. She competed in the women's 4 × 100 metre freestyle relay event at the 2016 Summer Olympics.

== Personal bests ==
As of 21 December 2021

=== Long course (50-meter pool) ===
Event	Time	Meet	Date	Note(s)
50 m freestyle	24.65	2017 World Championships	29 July 2017	
100 m freestyle	53.40	2017 Chinese National Games	1 September 2017	
200 m freestyle	1:58.78	Arena Pro Swim Indianapolis	3 March 2017	
50 m backstroke	28.66	2017 Chinese National Championships	14 October 2017	
100 m backstroke	1:03.38	2021 Chinese National Championships	1 May 2021	
50 m butterfly	27.21	2015 World Cup	30 September 2015	
100 m butterfly	1:00.94	2020 Chinese National Championships	29 September 2020	

=== Short course (25-meter pool) ===
Event	Time	Meet	Date	Note(s)
50 m freestyle	23.95	2018 World Championships	15 December 2018	NR,AS
100 m freestyle	52.04	2018 World Championships	12 December 2018	NR
200 m freestyle	1.57.03	2018 World Cup	16 November 2018	
50 m backstroke	27.32	2018 World Cup	2 November 2018	
50 m butterfly	26.27	2017 World Cup	19 November 2017	
100 m butterfly	1:04.16	2013 World Cup	17 October 2013	
100 m individual medley	1:01.79	2017 World Cup	15 November 2017	

Key: NR = National Record; AS = Asian Record
