= Jessica Steiger =

German swimmer

Personal information
- Nationality: German
- Born: 24 May 1992 (age 34)

Sport
- Sport: Swimming

Jessica Steiger (born 24 May 1992) is a German swimmer. She competed in the women's 50 metre breaststroke event at the 2018 FINA World Swimming Championships (25 m), in Hangzhou, China.
