= Tomomi Aoki =

Japanese swimmer (born 1994)

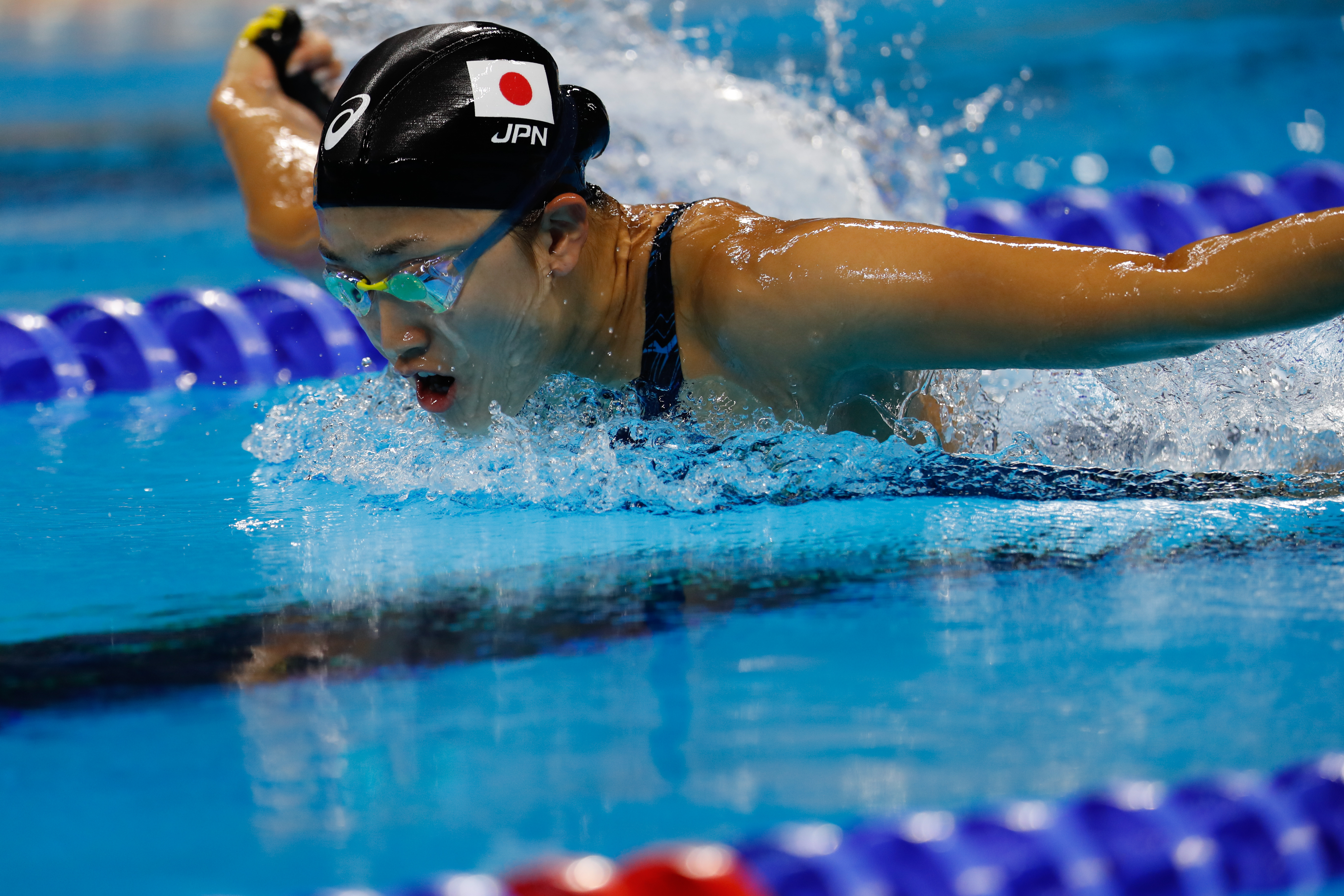

Personal information
- Born: 25 October 1994 (age 31)

Sport
- Sport: Swimming
Medal record
Representing Japan
Pan Pacific Championships
Silver medal – second place	2018 Tokyo	4×100 m mixed medley
Bronze medal – third place	2018 Tokyo	4×100 m medley
Asian Games
Gold medal – first place	2018 Jakarta	4×100 m freestyle
Gold medal – first place	2018 Jakarta	4×100 m medley
Silver medal – second place	2018 Jakarta	4×100 m mixed medley

Tomomi Aoki (青木 智美, Aoki Tomomi; born 25 October 1994) is a Japanese swimmer. She competed in the women's 4 × 200 metre freestyle relay event at the 2016 Summer Olympics.
