= Swimming at the 2018 European Aquatics Championships – Women's 100 metre breaststroke =

Women's 100 metre breaststroke at the 2018 European Aquatics Championships
- Venue: Tollcross International Swimming Centre
- Dates: 4 August (heats and semifinals); 5 August (final)
- Competitors: 48 from 27 nations
- Winning time: 1:05.53

Medalists
| gold medal | Yuliya Yefimova | Russia |
| silver medal | Rūta Meilutytė | Lithuania |
| bronze medal | Arianna Castiglioni | Italy |

The Women's 100 metre breaststroke competition of the 2018 European Aquatics Championships was held on 4 and 5 August 2018.

== Records ==
Prior to the competition, the existing world and championship records were as follows.

| | Name | Nation | Time | Location | Date |
|---|---|---|---|---|---|
| World record | Lilly King | United States | 1:04.13 | Budapest | 25 July 2017 |
| European record | Rūta Meilutytė | Lithuania | 1:04.35 | Barcelona | 29 July 2013 |
| Championship record | Rūta Meilutytė | Lithuania | 1:06.16 | London | 17 May 2016 |

The following new records were set during this competition.

| Date | Event | Name | Nationality | Time | Record |
|---|---|---|---|---|---|
| 4 August | Semifinal | Yuliya Yefimova | Russia | 1:05.87 | CR |
| 5 August | Final | Yuliya Yefimova | Russia | 1:05.53 | CR |

== Results ==
=== Heats ===
The heats were started on 4 August at 09:50.

| Rank | Heat | Lane | Name | Nationality | Time | Notes |
|---|---|---|---|---|---|---|
| 1 | 4 | 4 | Rūta Meilutytė | Lithuania | 1:06.89 | Q |
| 2 | 4 | 5 | Arianna Castiglioni | Italy | 1:07.13 | Q |
| 3 | 5 | 4 | Yuliya Yefimova | Russia | 1:07.25 | Q |
| 4 | 4 | 3 | Siobhan-Marie O'Connor | Great Britain | 1:07.32 | Q |
| 5 | 3 | 4 | Jessica Vall | Spain | 1:07.53 | Q |
| 6 | 4 | 6 | Marina García Urzainqui | Spain | 1:07.62 | Q |
| 7 | 4 | 7 | Sophie Hansson | Sweden | 1:07.70 | Q |
| 8 | 5 | 6 | Martina Carraro | Italy | 1:07.83 | Q |
| 9 | 3 | 3 | Rikke Møller Pedersen | Denmark | 1:07.90 | Q |
| 10 | 3 | 6 | Vitalina Simonova | Russia | 1:07.92 | Q |
| 11 | 5 | 0 | Anna Sztankovics | Hungary | 1:08.05 | Q |
| 12 | 3 | 7 | Fanny Lecluyse | Belgium | 1:08.17 | Q |
| 13 | 5 | 8 | Imogen Clark | Great Britain | 1:08.41 | Q |
| 14 | 4 | 8 | Ida Hulkko | Finland | 1:08.48 | Q |
| 15 | 3 | 5 | Mona McSharry | Ireland | 1:08.53 | Q |
| 15 | 3 | 8 | Matilde Schrøder | Denmark | 1:08.53 | Q |
| 15 | 5 | 5 | Sarah Vasey | Great Britain | 1:08.53 | |
| 18 | 4 | 2 | Jenna Laukkanen | Finland | 1:08.56 | |
| 18 | 5 | 3 | Tes Schouten | Netherlands | 1:08.56 | |
| 20 | 3 | 2 | Natalia Ivaneeva | Russia | 1:08.64 | |
| 21 | 5 | 2 | Jessica Steiger | Germany | 1:08.88 | |
| 22 | 1 | 4 | Anna Wermuth | Denmark | 1:08.93 | |
| 23 | 5 | 7 | Chloé Tutton | Great Britain | 1:08.94 | |
| 24 | 2 | 5 | Jessica Eriksson | Sweden | 1:08.99 | |
| 25 | 3 | 1 | Fanny Deberghes | France | 1:09.11 | |
| 26 | 5 | 9 | Lisa Mamié | Switzerland | 1:09.14 | |
| 27 | 4 | 0 | Maria Romanjuk | Estonia | 1:09.18 | |
| 28 | 5 | 1 | Kotryna Teterevkova | Lithuania | 1:09.22 | |
| 29 | 4 | 1 | Weronika Hallmann | Poland | 1:09.28 | |
| 30 | 2 | 6 | Tatiana Chișca | Moldova | 1:09.31 | NR |
| 31 | 2 | 1 | Anastasia Gorbenko | Israel | 1:09.44 | |
| 32 | 3 | 0 | Viktoriya Zeynep Güneş | Turkey | 1:09.70 | |
| 33 | 2 | 3 | Tjaša Vozel | Slovenia | 1:09.87 | |
| 34 | 2 | 2 | Thea Blomsterberg | Denmark | 1:09.91 | |
| 35 | 2 | 7 | Dalma Sebestyén | Hungary | 1:10.21 | |
| 36 | 1 | 6 | Alina Bulmag | Moldova | 1:10.35 | |
| 36 | 1 | 2 | Cornelia Pammer | Austria | 1:10.35 | |
| 38 | 1 | 3 | Nikoletta Pavlopoulou | Greece | 1:10.49 | |
| 39 | 2 | 0 | Stina Kajsa Colleou | Norway | 1:10.78 | |
| 40 | 1 | 5 | Sara Staudinger | Switzerland | 1:10.96 | |
| 41 | 2 | 8 | Raquel Pereira | Portugal | 1:11.22 | |
| 42 | 3 | 9 | Tina Čelik | Slovenia | 1:11.44 | |
| 43 | 2 | 4 | Elena Guttmann | Austria | 1:11.53 | |
| 44 | 1 | 1 | Kristýna Horská | Czech Republic | 1:11.80 | |
| 44 | 1 | 7 | Lea Polonsky | Israel | 1:11.80 | |
| 46 | 1 | 8 | Maria Harutjunjan | Estonia | 1:11.97 | |
| 47 | 2 | 9 | Veera Kivirinta | Finland | 1:12.00 | |
| 48 | 4 | 9 | Andrea Podmaníková | Slovakia | 1:12.18 | |

=== Semifinals ===
The semifinals were held on 4 August at 17:31.

==== Semifinal 1 ====
| Rank | Lane | Name | Nationality | Time | Notes |
|---|---|---|---|---|---|
| 1 | 5 | Siobhan-Marie O'Connor | Great Britain | 1:06.99 | Q |
| 2 | 4 | Arianna Castiglioni | Italy | 1:07.01 | Q |
| 3 | 3 | Marina García Urzainqui | Spain | 1:07.58 | Q |
| 4 | 6 | Martina Carraro | Italy | 1:07.71 | Q |
| 5 | 2 | Vitalina Simonova | Russia | 1:07.90 | |
| 6 | 7 | Fanny Lecluyse | Belgium | 1:07.95 | |
| 7 | 1 | Ida Hulkko | Finland | 1:08.04 | |
| 8 | 8 | Mona McSharry | Ireland | 1:08.40 | |

==== Semifinal 2 ====
| Rank | Lane | Name | Nationality | Time | Notes |
|---|---|---|---|---|---|
| 1 | 5 | Yuliya Yefimova | Russia | 1:05.87 | Q, CR |
| 2 | 3 | Jessica Vall | Spain | 1:07.08 | Q |
| 3 | 4 | Rūta Meilutytė | Lithuania | 1:07.16 | Q |
| 4 | 6 | Sophie Hansson | Sweden | 1:07.61 | Q |
| 5 | 2 | Rikke Møller Pedersen | Denmark | 1:07.96 | |
| 6 | 1 | Imogen Clark | Great Britain | 1:08.36 | |
| 7 | 7 | Anna Sztankovics | Hungary | 1:08.59 | |
| 8 | 8 | Matilde Schrøder | Denmark | 1:08.76 | |

=== Final ===
The final was held on 5 August at 17:25.

| Rank | Lane | Name | Nationality | Time | Notes |
|---|---|---|---|---|---|
| 1st place, gold medalist(s) | 4 | Yuliya Yefimova | Russia | 1:05.53 | CR |
| 2nd place, silver medalist(s) | 2 | Rūta Meilutytė | Lithuania | 1:06.26 | |
| 3rd place, bronze medalist(s) | 3 | Arianna Castiglioni | Italy | 1:06.54 | |
| 4 | 6 | Jessica Vall | Spain | 1:06.98 | |
| 5 | 5 | Siobhan-Marie O'Connor | Great Britain | 1:07.30 | |
| 6 | 7 | Marina García Urzainqui | Spain | 1:07.55 | |
| 7 | 8 | Martina Carraro | Italy | 1:07.59 | |
| 8 | 1 | Sophie Hansson | Sweden | 1:07.67 | |
