= Swimming at the 2024 European Aquatics Championships – Women's 100 metre breaststroke =

Women's 100 metre breaststroke at the 2024 European Aquatics Championships
- Venue: Sports Centre Milan Gale Muškatirović
- Dates: 18 June (heats and semifinals); 19 June (final)
- Winning time: 1:06.41

Medalists
gold medal	Eneli Jefimova	Estonia
silver medal	Lisa Mamié	Switzerland
bronze medal	Olivia Klint Ipsa	Sweden

The Women's 100 metre breaststroke competition of the 2024 European Aquatics Championships was held on 18 and 19 June 2024.

== Records ==
Prior to the competition, the existing world, European and championship records were as follows.

	Name	Nation	Time	Location	Date
World record	Lilly King	United States	1:04.13	Budapest	25 July 2017
European record	Rūta Meilutytė	Lithuania	1:04.35	Barcelona	29 July 2013
Championship record	Yuliya Efimova	Russia	1:05.53	Glasgow	5 August 2018

== Results ==
=== Heats ===
The heats were started on 18 June at 10:00.
Qualification Rules: The 16 fastest from the heats qualify to semifinals.

Rank	Heat	Lane	Name	Nationality	Time	Notes
1	4	5	Anastasia Gorbenko	Israel	1:06.15	Q
2	4	4	Eneli Jefimova	Estonia	1:06.67	Q
3	2	4	Lisa Mamié	Switzerland	1:07.19	Q
4	3	5	Olivia Klint Ipsa	Sweden	1:07.48	Q
5	3	3	Maria Romanjuk	Estonia	1:07.95	Q
6	3	4	Dominika Sztandera	Poland	1:08.17	Q
7	3	1	Kristýna Horská	Czech Republic	1:08.25	Q
8	4	2	Tina Čelik	Slovenia	1:08.36	Q
9	3	2	Ana Blažević	Croatia	1:08.76	Q
10	2	6	Leah Schlosshan	Great Britain	1:08.92	Q
11	4	3	Clara Rybak-Andersen	Denmark	1:09.04	Q
12	4	6	Niamh Coyne	Ireland	1:09.06	Q
13	2	5	Ida Hulkko	Finland	1:09.07	Q
14	3	7	Emelie Fast	Sweden	1:09.11	Q
15	3	6	Ana Rodrigues	Portugal	1:09.15	Q
16	2	8	Teya Nikolova	Bulgaria	1:09.22	Q
17	2	2	Eszter Békési	Hungary	1:09.43	
18	2	3	Andrea Podmaníková	Slovakia	1:09.48	
19	2	1	Ellie McCartney	Ireland	1:09.53	
20	4	0	Eleni Kontogeorgou	Greece	1:09.79	
21	1	4	Veera Kivirinta	Finland	1:09.88	
22	4	7	Chara Angelaki	Greece	1:09.93	
23	2	0	Nikoleta Trníková	Slovakia	1:10.37	
24	4	1	Martina Bukvić	Serbia	1:10.38	
25	2	7	Silje Rongevær Slyngstadli	Norway	1:10.81	
26	4	8	Klara Thormalm	Sweden	1:10.88	
27	3	0	Anna Munk Fuglsang	Denmark	1:11.10	
28	4	9	Anniina Murto	Finland	1:11.37	
29	3	9	Kiia Metsäkonkola	Finland	1:11.94	
30	2	9	Nadia Tudo	Andorra	1:12.59	
31	1	3	Stella Gjoka	Albania	1:15.00	
32	1	5	Birgitta Ingólfsdóttir	Iceland	1:15.34	
	3	8	Diana Petkova	Bulgaria	Disqualified	

=== Semifinals ===
The semifinals were started on 18 June at 18:54.
Qualification Rules: The 8 fastest from the heats qualify to the final.

Rank	Heat	Lane	Name	Nationality	Time	Notes
1	2	4	Eneli Jefimova	Estonia	1:06.60	Q
2	2	5	Olivia Klint Ipsa	Sweden	1:06.92	Q
3	1	4	Lisa Mamié	Switzerland	1:07.32	Q
4	2	3	Dominika Sztandera	Poland	1:07.35	Q
5	1	3	Kristýna Horská	Czech Republic	1:07.72	Q
6	1	5	Maria Romanjuk	Estonia	1:08.00	Q
7	2	2	Leah Schlosshan	Great Britain	1:08.35	Q
8	1	8	Andrea Podmaníková	Slovakia	1:08.72	Q
9	1	6	Ana Blažević	Croatia	1:08.83	
10	1	7	Ida Hulkko	Finland	1:08.91	
11	2	8	Teya Nikolova	Bulgaria	1:08.95	
12	2	1	Emelie Fast	Sweden	1:09.04	
13	2	7	Niamh Coyne	Ireland	1:09.07	
14	1	1	Ana Rodrigues	Portugal	1:09.17	
15	2	6	Tina Čelik	Slovenia	1:09.23	
16	1	2	Clara Rybak-Andersen	Denmark	1:09.48	

=== Final ===
The final was held on 19 June at 18:58.

Rank	Lane	Name	Nationality	Time	Notes
1st place, gold medalist(s)	4	Eneli Jefimova	Estonia	1:06.41	
2nd place, silver medalist(s)	3	Lisa Mamié	Switzerland	1:07.15	
3rd place, bronze medalist(s)	6	Olivia Klint Ipsa	Sweden	1:07.73	
4	5	Dominika Sztandera	Poland	1:07.75	
5	7	Maria Romanjuk	Estonia	1:08.22	
6	1	Ida Hulkko	Finland	1:08.94	
7	8	Ana Blažević	Croatia	1:09.25	
8	2	Andrea Podmaníková	Slovakia	1:09.27	
