= 2022 FINA World Swimming Championships (25 m) – Women's 100 metre breaststroke =

Swimming competition

Women's 100 metre breaststroke at the 2022 FINA World Swimming Championships (25 m)
- Venue: Melbourne Sports and Aquatic Centre
- Location: Melbourne, Australia
- Dates: 14 December (heats and semifinals); 15 December (final)
- Competitors: 52 from 45 nations
- Winning time: 1:02.67

Medalists
gold medal	Lilly King	United States
silver medal	Tes Schouten	Netherlands
bronze medal	Anna Elendt	Germany

The Women's 100 metre breaststroke competition of the 2022 FINA World Swimming Championships (25 m) was held on 14 and 15 December 2022.

== Records ==
Prior to the competition, the existing world and championship records were as follows.

World record	Rūta Meilutytė (LTU) Alia Atkinson (JAM) Alia Atkinson (JAM)	1:02.36	Moscow, Russia Doha, Qatar Chartres, France	12 October 2013 6 December 2014 26 August 2016
Competition record	Alia Atkinson (JAM)	1:02.36	Doha, Qatar	6 December 2014

== Results ==
=== Heats ===
The heats were started on 14 December at 12:30.

Rank	Heat	Lane	Name	Nationality	Time	Notes
1	7	4	Rūta Meilutytė	Lithuania	1:03.81	Q
2	5	6	Lara van Niekerk	South Africa	1:03.93	Q
3	5	4	Lilly King	United States	1:03.94	Q
4	6	4	Tang Qianting	China	1:04.07	Q
5	5	3	Tes Schouten	Netherlands	1:04.22	Q
6	5	5	Anna Elendt	Germany	1:04.53	Q
7	6	2	Mai Fukasawa	Japan	1:04.57	Q
8	6	5	Reona Aoki	Japan	1:04.58	Q
9	7	5	Sophie Hansson	Sweden	1:04.64	Q
10	7	1	Sydney Pickrem	Canada	1:04.73	Q
11	6	8	Thea Blomsterberg	Denmark	1:04.74	Q
12	4	4	Imogen Clark	Great Britain	1:05.05	Q
13	6	3	Benedetta Pilato	Italy	1:05.21	Q
14	7	2	Ida Hulkko	Finland	1:05.25	Q
15	5	2	Charlotte Bonnet	France	1:05.28	Q
15	7	7	Yang Chang	China	1:05.28	Q
17	6	7	Jenna Strauch	Australia	1:05.30	
18	5	7	Andrea Podmaníková	Slovakia	1:05.31	
19	7	8	Florine Gaspard	Belgium	1:05.49	
20	6	6	Annie Lazor	United States	1:05.51	
21	5	8	Lisa Mamié	Switzerland	1:05.56	
22	4	7	Macarena Ceballos	Argentina	1:05.62	
23	4	5	Klara Thormalm	Sweden	1:05.85	
24	4	6	Rachel Nicol	Canada	1:05.91	
25	4	8	Maria Romanjuk	Estonia	1:06.26	
26	1	1	Tara Vovk	Slovenia	1:06.29	
26	7	6	Chelsea Hodges	Australia	1:06.29	
28	6	1	Letitia Sim	Singapore	1:06.49	
29	4	2	Kristýna Horská	Czech Republic	1:06.57	
30	5	1	Veera Kivirinta	Finland	1:06.59	
31	3	5	Moon Su-a	South Korea	1:06.96	
32	4	3	Lena Kreundl	Austria	1:07.15	
33	3	7	Thanya Dela Cruz	Philippines	1:07.17	NR
34	3	1	Mary Connolly	Cook Islands	1:07.66	NR
35	3	4	Stefanía Gómez	Colombia	1:08.71	
36	3	6	Lam Hoi Kiu	Hong Kong	1:09.04	
37	3	3	Adelaida Pchelintseva	Kazakhstan	1:09.42	
38	1	7	Chen Pui Lam	Macau	1:09.79	NR
39	3	2	Nàdia Tudó	Andorra	1:11.31	
40	2	5	Victoria Russell	Bahamas	1:11.56	
41	2	1	Jayla Pina	Cape Verde	1:12.72	
42	1	6	Chahat Arora	India	1:13.13	NR
43	2	7	Asia Kent	Gibraltar	1:13.80	
44	2	8	Kelera Mudunasoko	Fiji	1:13.86	
45	2	6	Marina Abu Shamaleh	Palestine	1:13.92	
46	3	8	Krista Jurado	Guatemala	1:14.13	
47	2	2	Lara Dashti	Kuwait	1:14.61	
48	2	3	Emilie Grand'Pierre	Haiti	1:15.19	
49	1	4	Maria Batallones	Northern Mariana Islands	1:18.08	
50	1	5	Mariama Touré	Guinea	1:33.89	
51	1	2	Batourou Touré	Mali	1:49.99	
52	1	3	Salima Ahmadou	Niger	1:58.58	
	2	4	Ramudi Samarakoon	Sri Lanka	Did not start	
	4	1	Silje Slyngstadli	Norway	Did not start	
	7	3	Kotryna Teterevkova	Lithuania	Did not start	

=== Semifinals ===
The semifinals were started on 14 December at 20:45.

Rank	Heat	Lane	Name	Nationality	Time	Notes
1	2	5	Lilly King	United States	1:03.33	Q
2	2	4	Rūta Meilutytė	Lithuania	1:03.40	Q
3	1	6	Reona Aoki	Japan	1:04.13	Q
4	2	3	Tes Schouten	Netherlands	1:04.31	Q
5	1	4	Lara van Niekerk	South Africa	1:04.36	Q
5	1	5	Tang Qianting	China	1:04.36	Q
7	2	6	Mai Fukasawa	Japan	1:04.45	Q
8	1	3	Anna Elendt	Germany	1:04.46	Q
9	1	1	Ida Hulkko	Finland	1:04.85	
10	2	2	Sophie Hansson	Sweden	1:04.88	
11	1	8	Yang Chang	China	1:04.99	
12	1	2	Sydney Pickrem	Canada	1:05.08	
13	2	7	Thea Blomsterberg	Denmark	1:05.22	
14	1	7	Imogen Clark	Great Britain	1:05.40	
15	2	1	Benedetta Pilato	Italy	1:05.46	
16	2	8	Charlotte Bonnet	France	1:05.51	

=== Final ===
The final was held on 15 December at 20:37.

Rank	Lane	Name	Nationality	Time	Notes
1st place, gold medalist(s)	4	Lilly King	United States	1:02.67	
2nd place, silver medalist(s)	6	Tes Schouten	Netherlands	1:03.90	NR
3rd place, bronze medalist(s)	8	Anna Elendt	Germany	1:04.05	NR
4	7	Tang Qianting	China	1:04.06	
5	2	Lara van Niekerk	South Africa	1:04.12	
6	3	Reona Aoki	Japan	1:04.30	
7	1	Mai Fukasawa	Japan	1:04.48	
	5	Rūta Meilutytė	Lithuania	Disqualified	
