= Swimming at the 2022 European Aquatics Championships – Women's 100 metre breaststroke =

Women's 100 metre breaststroke at the 2022 European Aquatics Championships
- Venue: Foro Italico
- Dates: 12 August (heats and semifinals); 13 August (final)
- Competitors: 37 from 24 nations
- Winning time: 1:05.97

Medalists
gold medal	Benedetta Pilato	Italy
silver medal	Lisa Angiolini	Italy
bronze medal	Rūta Meilutytė	Lithuania

The Women's 100 metre breaststroke competition of the 2022 European Aquatics Championships was held on 12 and 13 August 2022.

== Records ==
Prior to the competition, the existing world, European and championship records were as follows.

	Name	Nationality	Time	Location	Date
World record	Lilly King	United States	1:04.13	Budapest	25 July 2017
European record	Rūta Meilutytė	Lithuania	1:04.35	Barcelona	29 July 2013
Championship record	Yuliya Yefimova	Russia	1:05.53	Glasgow	5 August 2018

== Results ==
=== Heats ===
The heats were started on 12 August at 09:31.

Rank	Heat	Lane	Name	Nationality	Time	Notes
1	2	4	Benedetta Pilato	Italy	1:05.77	Q
2	2	3	Lisa Angiolini	Italy	1:06.00	Q
3	3	4	Arianna Castiglioni	Italy	1:06.55	
4	4	5	Martina Carraro	Italy	1:07.04	
5	4	4	Sophie Hansson	Sweden	1:07.05	Q
6	2	5	Kotryna Teterevkova	Lithuania	1:07.22	Q
7	4	3	Mona McSharry	Ireland	1:07.30	Q
8	3	3	Lisa Mamié	Switzerland	1:07.38	Q
9	3	6	Tes Schouten	Netherlands	1:07.54	Q
10	3	5	Rūta Meilutytė	Lithuania	1:07.88	Q
11	2	6	Kara Hanlon	Great Britain	1:07.91	Q
12	4	6	Jessica Vall	Spain	1:08.00	Q
13	2	7	Klara Thormalm	Sweden	1:08.08	Q
14	2	2	Niamh Coyne	Ireland	1:08.11	Q
15	4	7	Dominika Sztandera	Poland	1:08.60	Q
16	4	2	Maria Romanjuk	Estonia	1:08.74	Q
17	4	0	Clara Rybak-Andersen	Denmark	1:08.79	Q
18	3	7	Thea Blomsterberg	Denmark	1:09.18	Q
18	3	1	Bente Fischer	Germany	1:09.18	Q
20	4	1	Andrea Podmaníková	Slovakia	1:09.24	
21	3	0	Ana Blažević	Croatia	1:09.28	
22	2	1	Veera Kivirinta	Finland	1:09.44	
23	3	2	Florine Gaspard	Belgium	1:09.45	
24	4	8	Julia Månsson	Sweden	1:09.71	
25	3	8	Ana Rodrigues	Portugal	1:09.73	
26	3	9	Kamila Isayeva	Ukraine	1:09.79	
27	2	8	Adèle Blanchetière	France	1:09.86	
28	2	9	Laura Lahtinen	Finland	1:09.92	
29	2	0	Kristýna Horská	Czech Republic	1:09.96	
30	4	9	Maria Drasidou	Greece	1:11.01	
31	1	4	Eleni Kontogeorgou	Greece	1:11.52	
32	1	3	Meri Mataja	Croatia	1:11.71	
33	1	6	Martta Ruuska	Finland	1:11.82	
34	1	5	Ellie McCartney	Ireland	1:12.16	
35	1	2	Defne Coşkun	Turkey	1:12.80	
36	1	7	Nàdia Tudó	Andorra	1:13.85	
37	1	1	Amy Micallef	Malta	1:18.39	

=== Semifinals ===
The semifinals were started on 12 August at 18:24.

Rank	Heat	Lane	Name	Nationality	Time	Notes
1	2	4	Benedetta Pilato	Italy	1:06.16	Q
2	1	6	Rūta Meilutytė	Lithuania	1:06.41	Q
3	2	3	Mona McSharry	Ireland	1:06.44	Q
4	1	5	Kotryna Teterevkova	Lithuania	1:06.67	Q
5	2	5	Sophie Hansson	Sweden	1:06.83	q
6	1	4	Lisa Angiolini	Italy	1:06.85	q
7	2	6	Tes Schouten	Netherlands	1:07.26	q
8	2	2	Kara Hanlon	Great Britain	1:07.35	q
9	1	3	Lisa Mamié	Switzerland	1:07.39	
10	1	2	Jessica Vall	Spain	1:07.86	
11	1	7	Niamh Coyne	Ireland	1:08.00	
12	2	7	Klara Thormalm	Sweden	1:08.15	
13	2	1	Dominika Sztandera	Poland	1:08.23	
14	1	8	Thea Blomsterberg	Denmark	1:08.46	
15	2	8	Clara Rybak-Andersen	Denmark	1:08.60	
16	1	1	Maria Romanjuk	Estonia	1:08.67	
17	1	0	Bente Fischer	Germany	1:08.78	

=== Final ===
The final was held on 13 August at 18:28.

Rank	Lane	Name	Nationality	Time	Notes
1st place, gold medalist(s)	4	Benedetta Pilato	Italy	1:05.97	
2nd place, silver medalist(s)	7	Lisa Angiolini	Italy	1:06.34	
3rd place, bronze medalist(s)	5	Rūta Meilutytė	Lithuania	1:06.50	
4	6	Kotryna Teterevkova	Lithuania	1:06.61	
5	3	Mona McSharry	Ireland	1:07.14	
6	2	Sophie Hansson	Sweden	1:07.31	
7	1	Tes Schouten	Netherlands	1:07.66	
8	8	Kara Hanlon	Great Britain	1:08.08	
