= 2022 FINA World Swimming Championships (25 m) – Women's 50 metre breaststroke =

Swimming competition

Women's 50 metre breaststroke at the 2022 FINA World Swimming Championships (25 m)
- Venue: Melbourne Sports and Aquatic Centre
- Location: Melbourne, Australia
- Dates: 17 December (heats and semifinals); 18 December (final)
- Competitors: 48 from 44 nations
- Winning time: 28.50

Medalists
gold medal	Rūta Meilutytė	Lithuania
silver medal	Lara van Niekerk	South Africa
bronze medal	Lilly King	United States

The Women's 50 metre breaststroke competition of the 2022 FINA World Swimming Championships (25 m) was held on 17 and 18 December 2022.

== Records ==
Prior to the competition, the existing world and championship records were as follows.

World record	Alia Atkinson (JAM)	28.56	Budapest, Hungary	6 October 2018
Competition record	Rūta Meilutytė (LTU)	28.81	Doha, Qatar	3 December 2014

The following new records were set during this competition:

Date	Event	Name	Nationality	Time	Record
17 December	Semifinal 2	Rūta Meilutytė	Lithuania	28.37	WR

== Results ==
=== Heats ===
The heats were started on 17 December at 12:36.

Rank	Heat	Lane	Name	Nationality	Time	Notes
1	7	4	Rūta Meilutytė	Lithuania	29.10	Q
2	5	4	Tang Qianting	China	29.38	Q, AS
3	6	3	Lara van Niekerk	South Africa	29.45	Q, AF
4	7	5	Imogen Clark	Great Britain	29.51	Q
5	6	4	Lilly King	United States	29.53	Q
6	6	7	Anna Elendt	Germany	29.59	Q
7	6	5	Benedetta Pilato	Italy	29.63	Q
8	6	6	Veera Kivirinta	Finland	29.72	Q
9	7	6	Florine Gaspard	Belgium	29.79	Q
10	7	3	Reona Aoki	Japan	29.81	Q
11	7	2	Chelsea Hodges	Australia	29.84	Q
12	5	3	Ida Hulkko	Finland	29.89	Q
13	6	2	Klara Thormalm	Sweden	30.06	Q
14	5	6	Andrea Podmaníková	Slovakia	30.14	Q
15	6	1	Fleur Vermeiren	Belgium	30.22	Q
16	5	2	Macarena Ceballos	Argentina	30.33	Q
17	7	7	Charlotte Bonnet	France	30.35	
18	5	1	Silje Slyngstadli	Norway	30.36	
19	4	2	Tara Vovk	Slovenia	30.39	NR
20	4	5	Rachel Nicol	Canada	30.43	
21	7	8	Jenjira Srisaard	Thailand	30.48	NR
22	4	4	Letitia Sim	Singapore	30.59	
23	4	3	Annie Lazor	United States	30.69	
24	5	8	Lisa Mamié	Switzerland	30.84	
25	6	8	Adelaida Pchelintseva	Kazakhstan	30.87	
26	4	8	Thanya Dela Cruz	Philippines	31.19	NR
27	3	4	Mary Connolly	Cook Islands	31.68	NR
28	4	1	Lam Hoi Kiu	Hong Kong	31.71	
29	3	5	Kirabo Namutebi	Uganda	32.47	NR
30	3	3	Victoria Russell	Bahamas	32.54	
31	2	1	Chahat Arora	India	32.91	NR
32	3	6	Marina Abu Shamaleh	Palestine	33.49	
33	3	1	Emilie Grand'Pierre	Haiti	33.71	NR
34	3	2	Kelera Mudunasoko	Fiji	34.05	
35	3	7	Lara Dashti	Kuwait	34.21	
36	2	4	Maria Batallones	Northern Mariana Islands	34.58	
37	3	8	Taeyanna Adams	Federated States of Micronesia	36.64	
38	2	3	Ria Save	Tanzania	38.22	
39	2	5	Jessica Makwenda	Malawi	38.99	
40	2	6	Mariama Touré	Guinea	40.92	
41	1	3	Ungilreng Ruluked	Palau	41.65	
42	2	2	Abbi Illis	Sint Maarten	42.87	
43	1	4	Mary Yongai	Sierra Leone	46.98	
44	2	7	Salima Ahmadou	Niger	48.33	
45	1	5	Batourou Touré	Mali	48.96	
	4	6	Diana Petkova	Bulgaria	Disqualified	
	4	7	Maria Romanjuk	Estonia	Disqualified	
	5	7	Jenna Strauch	Australia	Disqualified	
	5	5	Sophie Hansson	Sweden	Did not start	
	7	1	Kotryna Teterevkova	Lithuania	Did not start	

=== Semifinals ===
The semifinals were started on 17 December at 21:07.

Rank	Heat	Lane	Name	Nationality	Time	Notes
1	2	4	Rūta Meilutytė	Lithuania	28.37	Q, WR
2	2	3	Lilly King	United States	28.86	Q
3	2	5	Lara van Niekerk	South Africa	29.27	Q, AF
4	1	4	Tang Qianting	China	29.28	Q, AS
5	1	5	Imogen Clark	Great Britain	29.30	Q, NR
6	2	6	Benedetta Pilato	Italy	29.42	Q
7	1	3	Anna Elendt	Germany	29.52	Q, NR
8	1	6	Veera Kivirinta	Finland	29.80	Q
9	2	7	Chelsea Hodges	Australia	29.85	
10	1	7	Ida Hulkko	Finland	29.94	
11	2	2	Florine Gaspard	Belgium	29.98	
12	1	2	Reona Aoki	Japan	30.01	
12	2	1	Klara Thormalm	Sweden	30.01	
14	1	8	Macarena Ceballos	Argentina	30.10	
15	1	1	Andrea Podmaníková	Slovakia	30.21	
16	2	8	Fleur Vermeiren	Belgium	30.29	

=== Final ===
The final was held on 18 December at 19:49.

Rank	Lane	Name	Nationality	Time	Notes
1st place, gold medalist(s)	4	Rūta Meilutytė	Lithuania	28.50	
2nd place, silver medalist(s)	3	Lara van Niekerk	South Africa	29.09	AF
3rd place, bronze medalist(s)	5	Lilly King	United States	29.11	
4	6	Tang Qianting	China	29.22	AS
5	1	Anna Elendt	Germany	29.30	NR
6	2	Imogen Clark	Great Britain	29.47	
7	7	Benedetta Pilato	Italy	29.48	
8	8	Veera Kivirinta	Finland	29.84	
