= 2021 FINA World Swimming Championships (25 m) – Women's 50 metre breaststroke =

Swimming competition

Women's 50 metre breaststroke at the 2021 FINA World Swimming Championships (25 m)
- Venue: Etihad Arena
- Location: Abu Dhabi, United Arab Emirates
- Dates: 16 December (heats and semifinals); 17 December (final)
- Competitors: 64 from 59 nations
- Winning time: 29.34

Medalists
gold medal	Anastasia Gorbenko	Israel
silver medal	Benedetta Pilato	Italy
bronze medal	Sophie Hansson	Sweden

The Women's 50 metre breaststroke competition of the 2021 FINA World Swimming Championships (25 m) was held on 16 and 17 December 2021.

== Records ==
Prior to the competition, the existing world and championship records were as follows.

World record	Alia Atkinson (JAM)	28.56	Budapest, Hungary	6 October 2018
Competition record	Rūta Meilutytė (LTU)	28.81	Doha, Qatar	3 December 2014

== Results ==
=== Heats ===
The heats were started on 16 December at 10:41.

Rank	Heat	Lane	Name	Nationality	Time	Notes
1	7	4	Alia Atkinson	Jamaica	29.55	Q
2	7	3	Sophie Hansson	Sweden	29.57	Q, NR
3	8	4	Benedetta Pilato	Italy	29.73	Q
3	8	5	Ida Hulkko	Finland	29.73	Q
5	7	6	Mona McSharry	Ireland	29.90	Q
6	8	6	Veera Kivirinta	Finland	30.02	Q
7	7	5	Anastasia Gorbenko	Israel	30.08	Q
8	6	6	Jhennifer Conceição	Brazil	30.11	Q
9	7	2	Lydia Jacoby	United States	30.16	Q
9	8	8	Fanny Lecluyse	Belgium	30.16	Q
11	7	1	Andrea Podmaníková	Slovakia	30.17	Q, NR
11	8	3	Alina Zmushka	Belarus	30.17	Q
13	6	5	Nika Godun	Russian Swimming Federation	30.32	Q
14	8	2	Klara Thormalm	Sweden	30.39	Q
15	7	7	Kotryna Teterevkova	Lithuania	30.41	Q
16	6	3	Florine Gaspard	Belgium	30.45	QSO
16	6	7	Molly Renshaw	Great Britain	30.45	QSO
18	6	9	Jenjira Srisaard	Thailand	30.53	NR
19	6	8	Jessica Vall	Spain	30.56	
20	6	2	Eneli Jefimova	Estonia	30.61	
21	8	0	Maria Drasidou	Greece	30.67	
22	8	1	Cornelia Pammer	Austria	30.73	
23	8	7	Lisa Mamié	Switzerland	30.75	
24	6	1	Kim Busch	Netherlands	30.82	
25	5	6	Diana Petkova	Bulgaria	30.98	NR
26	7	8	Evgeniia Chikunova	Russian Swimming Federation	31.12	
27	5	3	Lam Hoi Kiu	Hong Kong	31.33	
28	5	1	Lillian Higgs	Bahamas	31.38	NR
28	5	8	Eszter Békési	Hungary	31.38	
30	6	0	Back Su-yeon	South Korea	31.39	
31	5	7	Melissa Rodríguez	Mexico	31.52	NR
32	5	4	Justine Delmas	France	31.65	
33	5	5	Adelaida Pchelintseva	Kazakhstan	31.73	
34	7	9	Martina Barbeito	Argentina	31.82	
35	5	0	Houda El Baroudi	Morocco	31.89	
36	4	4	Emily Santos	Panama	32.08	NR
37	5	9	Marissa Lugo	Puerto Rico	32.39	NR
38	4	6	Alicia Kok Shun	Mauritius	32.79	NR
39	4	1	Elisa Funes	El Salvador	32.93	NR
40	4	2	Claudia Verdino	Monaco	33.13	
41	4	5	Kirabo Namutebi	Uganda	33.35	
42	4	0	Anaika Charles	Grenada	33.95	
43	2	5	Marina Abu Shamaleh	Palestine	34.00	NR
44	4	8	Mariam Mithqal	Jordan	34.07	NR
45	4	7	Naima Hazell	Saint Lucia	34.11	
45	4	9	Valentina Aloisio	Bolivia	34.11	
47	2	3	Ekaterina Smorkalova	Kyrgyzstan	35.42	
48	3	5	Taeyanna Adams	Federated States of Micronesia	36.11	
49	3	3	Upaasti Maharjan	Nepal	37.13	
50	2	8	Shoko Litulumar	Northern Mariana Islands	39.91	
51	2	1	Sophie Beth Taylor	Turks and Caicos Islands	42.71	
52	3	6	Brhane Amare	Ethiopia	43.34	
53	3	1	Kanu Isha	Sierra Leone	45.35	
54	1	5	Naima-Zahra Amison	Djibouti	47.37	
55	2	6	Sabrina Ikromova	Tajikistan	49.61	
56	2	0	Mariama Conte	Guinea	50.47	
57	3	0	Sira Sowe	Gambia	54.64	
	1	4	Claudette Ishimwe	Rwanda	DSQ	
	3	4	Lara Dashti	Kuwait	DSQ	
	3	8	Salima Ahmadou	Niger	DSQ	
	5	2	Nina Stanisavljević	Serbia	DSQ	
	6	4	Arianna Castiglioni	Italy	DSQ	
	7	0	Tang Qianting	China	DSQ	
	8	9	Tjaša Vozel	Slovenia	DSQ	
	1	3	Rita Acaba Ocomo	Equatorial Guinea	DNS	
	2	2	Grace Nguelo'o	Cameroon	DNS	
	2	4	Anaikah Thélémaque	Haiti	DNS	
	2	7	Eunike Mathayo	Tanzania	DNS	
	3	2	Aminata Sangafe	Mali	DNS	
	3	7	Fatoumata Tinta	Burkina Faso	DNS	
	3	9	Danitrias Omba	Democratic Republic of the Congo	DNS	
	4	3	Jayla Pina	Cape Verde	DNS	

==== Swim-off ====
The swim-off was held on 16 December at 12:42.

Rank	Lane	Name	Nationality	Time	Notes
1	4	Florine Gaspard	Belgium	30.11	Q
2	5	Molly Renshaw	Great Britain	30.33	

=== Semifinals ===
The semifinals were started on 16 December at 18:21.

Rank	Heat	Lane	Name	Nationality	Time	Notes
1	2	1	Nika Godun	Russian Swimming Federation	29.42	Q
2	1	5	Ida Hulkko	Finland	29.62	Q
3	2	3	Mona McSharry	Ireland	29.65	Q, NR
4	1	4	Sophie Hansson	Sweden	29.76	Q
4	2	5	Benedetta Pilato	Italy	29.76	Q
6	2	6	Anastasia Gorbenko	Israel	29.77	Q
7	1	2	Fanny Lecluyse	Belgium	29.85	Q
8	1	3	Veera Kivirinta	Finland	29.97	Q
9	1	6	Jhennifer Conceição	Brazil	30.03	
10	2	7	Andrea Podmaníková	Slovakia	30.08	NR
11	1	8	Florine Gaspard	Belgium	30.10	
12	2	8	Kotryna Teterevkova	Lithuania	30.19	
13	2	2	Lydia Jacoby	United States	30.21	
14	1	7	Alina Zmushka	Belarus	30.24	
15	1	1	Klara Thormalm	Sweden	30.33	
	2	4	Alia Atkinson	Jamaica	DSQ	

=== Final ===
The final was held on 17 December at 18:42.

Rank	Lane	Name	Nationality	Time	Notes
1st place, gold medalist(s)	7	Anastasia Gorbenko	Israel	29.34	NR
2nd place, silver medalist(s)	2	Benedetta Pilato	Italy	29.50	
3rd place, bronze medalist(s)	6	Sophie Hansson	Sweden	29.55	NR
4	3	Mona McSharry	Ireland	29.59	NR
5	4	Nika Godun	Russian Swimming Federation	29.79	
6	5	Ida Hulkko	Finland	29.88	
7	1	Fanny Lecluyse	Belgium	29.95	
8	8	Veera Kivirinta	Finland	30.07	
