= 2024 World Aquatics Swimming Championships (25 m) – Women's 50 metre breaststroke =

Swimming competition

Women's 50 metre breaststroke at the 2024 World Aquatics Swimming Championships (25 m)
- Venue: Duna Arena
- Location: Budapest, Hungary
- Dates: 14 December (heats and semifinals); 15 December (final)
- Competitors: 63
- Winning time: 28.54

Medalists
gold medal	Rūta Meilutytė	Lithuania
silver medal	Tang Qianting	China
bronze medal	Lilly King	United States

The women's 50 metre breaststroke event at the 2024 World Aquatics Swimming Championships (25 m) was held from 14 to 15 December 2024 at the Duna Arena in Budapest, Hungary.

== Records ==
Prior to the competition, the existing world and championship records were as follows.

World record	Ruta Meilutyte (LTU)	28.37	Melbourne, Australia	17 December 2022
Competition record	Ruta Meilutyte (LTU)	28.37	Melbourne, Australia	17 December 2022

The following record was established during the competition:

== Results ==
=== Heats ===
The heats were started on 14 December at 10:40.

Rank	Heat	Lane	Name	Nationality	Time	Notes
1	7	4	Tang Qianting	China	29.15	Q
2	5	5	Lilly King	United States	29.20	Q
3	5	4	Eneli Jefimova	Estonia	29.24	Q
=4	6	4	Benedetta Pilato	Italy	29.38	Q
=4	7	5	Rūta Meilutytė	Lithuania	29.38	Q
6	6	5	Veera Kivirinta	Finland	29.62	Q
7	6	3	Alina Zmushka	Neutral Athletes A	29.84	Q
8	5	6	Sophie Hansson	Sweden	29.86	Q
=9	5	3	Silje Slyngstadli	Norway	29.92	Q
=9	5	7	Yuliya Efimova	Neutral Athletes B	29.92	Q
=9	6	0	Angharad Evans	United Kingdom	29.92	Q
12	6	1	Sophie Angus	Canada	30.02	Q
13	7	0	Dominika Sztandera	Poland	30.10	Q
14	5	2	Tessa Giele	Netherlands	30.14	Q
15	5	8	Chiara Della Corte	Italy	30.20	Q
16	6	7	Meri Mataja	Croatia	30.21	Q
=17	6	9	Alexanne Lepage	Canada	30.25	R
=17	7	3	Evgeniia Chikunova	Neutral Athletes B	30.25	R
19	7	7	Klara Thormalm	Sweden	30.28	
20	7	6	Andrea Podmaníková	Slovakia	30.33	
21	4	5	Kotryna Teterevkova	Lithuania	30.34	
22	4	4	Teya Nikolova	Bulgaria	30.35	
=23	6	6	Lara van Niekerk	South Africa	30.36	
=23	7	2	Adelaida Pchelintseva	Kazakhstan	30.36	NR
25	6	2	Diana Petkova	Bulgaria	30.39	
26	4	3	Macarena Ceballos	Argentina	30.47	
27	5	1	Jenjira Srisa-Ard	Thailand	30.48	=NR
28	7	8	Park Sieun	South Korea	30.61	
=29	3	4	Lin Pei-wun	Chinese Taipei	30.62	NR
=29	4	1	Kristýna Horská	Czech Republic	30.62	
31	4	7	Emma Weber	United States	30.67	
32	3	5	Henrietta Fangli	Hungary	30.70	
33	6	8	Kotomi Kato	Japan	30.76	
34	7	1	Ana Pinho Rodrigues	Portugal	30.83	
35	5	0	Stefanía Gómez	Colombia	30.85	
36	7	9	Yu Jingyao	China	30.87	
37	4	8	Mercedes Toledo	Venezuela	30.92	NR
38	3	6	Lanihei Connolly	Cook Islands	30.96	NR
39	4	0	Phee Jinq En	Malaysia	31.05	NR
40	4	6	Maria Thaleia Drasidou	Greece	31.11	
41	5	9	Brearna Crawford	New Zealand	31.20	
42	3	2	Imane Houda El Barodi	Morocco	31.40	
43	4	9	Niamh Coyne	Ireland	31.48	
44	4	2	Man Wui Kiu	Hong Kong	31.49	
=45	3	3	Lynn El Hajj	Lebanon	31.67	NR
=45	3	8	Valerie Rose Tarazi	Palestine	31.67	NR
47	3	0	Nguyen Thuy Hien	Vietnam	32.90	
48	3	1	Will-Insha Jules-Marthe	Cape Verde	33.02	
49	3	7	Ellie Shaw	Netherlands Antilles	33.12	
50	3	9	Victoria Russell	Bahamas	33.26	
51	2	5	Anaika Otway	Grenada	33.31	
52	2	4	Stella Gjoka	Albania	33.43	
53	2	8	Yun-Suh Chang	Botswana	34.10	NR
54	2	6	Vaoahi Afu	Tonga	34.26	
55	2	3	Kestra Kihleng	Federated States of Micronesia	36.14	
56	2	2	Hamna Ahmed	Maldives	36.55	NR
57	1	4	Maesha Saadi	Comoros	37.51	
58	2	7	Aynur Merdanova	Turkmenistan	37.67	
59	2	0	Ceylia Djeutcha	Cameroon	38.29	
60	2	9	Divine Miansadi Mpolo	Democratic Republic of the Congo	53.51	
	1	3	Xiang Kombate	Togo	Did not start	
	1	5	Mimarcia Ie	Guinea-Bissau	Disqualified	
	2	1	Mariama Touré	Guinea	Did not start	
	3	6	Teresa Ivan	Slovakia	Disqualified	

=== Semifinals ===
The semifinals were started on 14 December at 17:48.

Rank	Heat	Lane	Name	Nationality	Time	Notes
1	2	3	Rūta Meilutytė	Lithuania	28.39	Q
2	2	4	Tang Qianting	China	28.86	Q
3	1	4	Lilly King	United States	28.99	Q
4	2	1	Dominika Sztandera	Poland	29.22	Q, NR
5	1	5	Benedetta Pilato	Italy	29.24	Q
6	2	5	Eneli Jefimova	Estonia	29.39	Q
7	1	3	Veera Kivirinta	Finland	29.44	Q
8	2	6	Alina Zmushka	Neutral Athletes A	29.68	Q
9	1	1	Tessa Giele	Netherlands	29.80	R
10	1	6	Sophie Hansson	Sweden	29.89	R
11	1	2	Yuliya Efimova	Neutral Athletes B	29.92	
12	2	7	Angharad Evans	United Kingdom	29.95	
13	1	7	Sophie Angus	Canada	30.03	
14	2	2	Silje Slyngstadli	Norway	30.04	
15	2	8	Chiara Della Corte	Italy	30.06	
16	1	8	Meri Mataja	Croatia	30.17	NR

=== Final ===
The final was held on 15 December at 17:47.

Rank	Lane	Name	Nationality	Time	Notes
1st place, gold medalist(s)	4	Rūta Meilutytė	Lithuania	28.54	
2nd place, silver medalist(s)	5	Tang Qianting	China	28.86	
3rd place, bronze medalist(s)	3	Lilly King	United States	28.91	
4	2	Benedetta Pilato	Italy	29.11	
5	7	Eneli Jefimova	Estonia	29.13	
6	6	Dominika Sztandera	Poland	29.49	
7	8	Alina Zmushka	Neutral Athletes A	29.56	
8	1	Veera Kivirinta	Finland	29.69	
