= Swimming at the 2018 European Aquatics Championships – Women's 50 metre breaststroke =

Women's 50 metre breaststroke at the 2018 European Aquatics Championships
- Venue: Tollcross International Swimming Centre
- Dates: 8 August (heats and semifinals); 9 August (final)
- Competitors: 43 from 25 nations
- Winning time: 29.81

Medalists
gold medal	Yuliya Yefimova	Russia
silver medal	Imogen Clark	Great Britain
bronze medal	Arianna Castiglioni	Italy

The Women's 50 metre breaststroke competition of the 2018 European Aquatics Championships was held on 8 and 9 August 2018.

== Records ==
Prior to the competition, the existing world and championship records were as follows.

	Name	Nation	Time	Location	Date
World record	Lilly King	United States	29.40	Budapest	25 July 2017
European record	Rūta Meilutytė	Lithuania	29.48	Barcelona	3 August 2013
Championship record	Rūta Meilutytė	Lithuania	29.88	Berlin	23 August 2014

The following new records were set during this competition.

Date	Event	Name	Nationality	Time	Record
8 August	Semifinal	Yuliya Yefimova	Russia	29.66	CR

== Results ==
=== Heats ===
The heats were started on 8 August at 09:51.

Rank	Heat	Lane	Name	Nationality	Time	Notes
1	5	4	Yuliya Yefimova	Russia	30.20	Q
2	5	5	Arianna Castiglioni	Italy	30.30	Q
3	3	4	Imogen Clark	Great Britain	30.40	Q
4	3	5	Natalia Ivaneeva	Russia	30.60	Q
5	4	4	Rūta Meilutytė	Lithuania	30.73	Q
5	4	5	Sarah Vasey	Great Britain	30.73	Q
7	3	6	Sophie Hansson	Sweden	30.79	Q
8	3	3	Martina Carraro	Italy	30.87	Q
9	4	3	Jenna Laukkanen	Finland	31.03	Q
10	5	6	Mona McSharry	Ireland	31.09	Q
11	5	3	Ida Hulkko	Finland	31.11	Q
12	5	2	Anna Sztankovics	Hungary	31.15	Q
13	4	6	Veera Kivirinta	Finland	31.26	
14	4	7	Matilde Schrøder	Denmark	31.32	Q
15	4	8	Tatiana Chișca	Moldova	31.40	Q
16	5	7	Fanny Lecluyse	Belgium	31.43	Q
17	3	7	Rikke Møller Pedersen	Denmark	31.44	Q
18	3	8	Jessica Eriksson	Sweden	31.77	
19	5	8	Fanny Deberghes	France	31.80	
20	4	2	Jessica Vall	Spain	31.86	
21	3	9	Maria Romanjuk	Estonia	32.00	
22	5	9	Kotryna Teterevkova	Lithuania	32.01	
23	2	6	Viktoriya Zeynep Güneş	Turkey	32.05	
24	5	1	Weronika Hallmann	Poland	32.08	
25	2	5	Elena Guttmann	Austria	32.11	
25	3	2	Tes Schouten	Netherlands	32.11	
27	2	7	Anna Wermuth	Denmark	32.26	
28	3	1	Susann Bjørnsen	Norway	32.30	
29	4	1	Alina Zmushka	Belarus	32.32	
30	5	0	Petra Chocová	Czech Republic	32.35	
31	2	3	Lisa Mamie	Switzerland	32.48	
31	1	3	Cornelia Pammer	Austria	32.48	
33	4	0	Tina Čelik	Slovenia	32.65	
34	2	4	Tjaša Vozel	Slovenia	32.70	
35	4	9	Vitalina Simonova	Russia	32.77	
36	2	8	Alina Bulmag	Moldova	32.80	
37	1	4	Sara Staudinger	Switzerland	32.89	
38	1	5	Nikoleta Trníková	Slovakia	32.98	
39	2	1	Maria Harutjunjan	Estonia	33.04	
40	2	2	Nikoletta Pavlopoulou	Greece	33.08	
41	3	0	Andrea Podmaníková	Slovakia	33.32	
42	2	9	Stina Colleou	Norway	33.62	
43	2	0	Thea Blomsterberg	Denmark	33.74	

=== Semifinals ===
The semifinals were started on 8 August at 17:25.

==== Semifinal 1 ====
Rank	Lane	Name	Nationality	Time	Notes
1	3	Rūta Meilutytė	Lithuania	30.38	Q
2	4	Arianna Castiglioni	Italy	30.40	Q
3	5	Natalia Ivaneeva	Russia	30.56	Q
4	6	Martina Carraro	Italy	30.70	Q
5	7	Anna Sztankovics	Hungary	31.34	
6	2	Mona McSharry	Ireland	31.45	
7	1	Tatiana Chișca	Moldova	31.51	
8	8	Rikke Møller Pedersen	Denmark	31.70	

==== Semifinal 2 ====
Rank	Lane	Name	Nationality	Time	Notes
1	4	Yuliya Yefimova	Russia	29.66	Q, CR
2	5	Imogen Clark	Great Britain	30.04	Q
3	7	Ida Hulkko	Finland	30.53	Q
4	6	Sophie Hansson	Sweden	30.72	Q
5	3	Sarah Vasey	Great Britain	31.02	
6	2	Jenna Laukkanen	Finland	31.18	
7	1	Matilde Schrøder	Denmark	31.55	
8	8	Fanny Lecluyse	Belgium	31.57	

=== Final ===
The final was started on 9 August at 16:55.

Rank	Lane	Name	Nationality	Time	Notes
1st place, gold medalist(s)	4	Yuliya Yefimova	Russia	29.81	
2nd place, silver medalist(s)	5	Imogen Clark	Great Britain	30.34	
3rd place, bronze medalist(s)	6	Arianna Castiglioni	Italy	30.41	
4	3	Rūta Meilutytė	Lithuania	30.46	
5	2	Ida Hulkko	Finland	31.02	
6	1	Martina Carraro	Italy	31.11	
7	7	Natalia Ivaneeva	Russia	31.19	
8	8	Sophie Hansson	Sweden	31.23	
