= Swimming at the 2022 European Aquatics Championships – Women's 50 metre breaststroke =

Women's 50 metre breaststroke at the 2022 European Aquatics Championships
- Venue: Foro Italico
- Dates: 16 August (heats and semifinals); 17 August (final)
- Competitors: 33 from 21 nations
- Winning time: 29.59

Medalists
gold medal	Rūta Meilutytė	Lithuania
silver medal	Benedetta Pilato	Italy
bronze medal	Imogen Clark	Great Britain

The Women's 50 metre breaststroke competition of the 2022 European Aquatics Championships was held on 16 and 17 August 2022.

== Records ==
Prior to the competition, the existing world, European and championship records were as follows.

	Name	Nation	Time	Location	Date
World record European record Championship record	Benedetta Pilato	Italy	29.30	Budapest	22 May 2021

== Results ==
=== Heats ===
The heats were started on 16 August at 09:45.

Rank	Heat	Lane	Name	Nationality	Time	Notes
1	2	4	Arianna Castiglioni	Italy	29.91	Q
2	4	4	Benedetta Pilato	Italy	29.93	Q
3	3	4	Rūta Meilutytė	Lithuania	30.12	Q
4	4	5	Imogen Clark	Great Britain	30.18	Q
5	3	3	Veera Kivirinta	Finland	30.34	Q
6	2	3	Lisa Angiolini	Italy	30.62	
7	3	5	Sophie Hansson	Sweden	30.80	Q
8	2	5	Martina Carraro	Italy	30.90	
9	4	3	Florine Gaspard	Belgium	30.94	Q
10	2	6	Ana Rodrigues	Portugal	31.04	Q, NR
10	4	6	Kotryna Teterevkova	Lithuania	31.04	Q
12	2	2	Louise Palmans	Netherlands	31.37	Q
13	3	1	Mona McSharry	Ireland	31.41	Q
14	4	2	Klara Thormalm	Sweden	31.43	Q
15	3	2	Kara Hanlon	Great Britain	31.60	Q
16	4	7	Lisa Mamié	Switzerland	31.72	Q
17	2	7	Dominika Sztandera	Poland	31.74	Q
18	3	6	Maria Drasidou	Greece	31.77	Q
19	3	0	Andrea Podmaníková	Slovakia	31.86	
20	3	8	Laura Lahtinen	Finland	31.93	
21	4	9	Maria Romanjuk	Estonia	31.94	
22	3	7	Jessica Vall	Spain	32.07	
23	4	8	Kamila Isayeva	Ukraine	32.08	
24	2	8	Meri Mataja	Croatia	32.22	
25	2	1	Nele Schulze	Germany	32.28	
26	2	0	Cecilia Viberg	Sweden	32.30	
27	4	0	Julia Månsson	Sweden	32.54	
28	1	5	Nina Stanisavljević	Serbia	32.79	
29	4	1	Jenna Laukkanen	Finland	32.82	
30	1	3	Eleni Kontogeorgou	Greece	33.22	
31	1	4	Martta Ruuska	Finland	33.54	
32	1	7	Varsenik Manucharyan	Armenia	34.23	
33	1	2	Amy Micallef	Malta	35.55	
	1	6	Defne Coşkun	Turkey	Did not start	
	2	9	Thea Blomsterberg	Denmark	Did not start	
	3	9	Niamh Coyne	Ireland	Did not start	

=== Semifinals ===
The semifinals were started on 16 August at 18:31.

Rank	Heat	Lane	Name	Nationality	Time	Notes
1	2	5	Rūta Meilutytė	Lithuania	29.44	Q, NR
2	1	4	Benedetta Pilato	Italy	29.85	Q
3	1	5	Imogen Clark	Great Britain	30.10	Q
4	2	4	Arianna Castiglioni	Italy	30.27	Q
5	2	3	Veera Kivirinta	Finland	30.77	q
6	2	6	Florine Gaspard	Belgium	30.86	q
7	2	7	Mona McSharry	Ireland	30.90	q
8	1	3	Sophie Hansson	Sweden	31.05	q
9	1	6	Kotryna Teterevkova	Lithuania	31.07	
10	2	1	Kara Hanlon	Great Britain	31.32	
11	2	2	Ana Rodrigues	Portugal	31.33	
12	2	8	Dominika Sztandera	Poland	31.35	
13	1	7	Klara Thormalm	Sweden	31.38	
14	1	8	Maria Drasidou	Greece	31.57	
15	1	2	Louise Palmans	Netherlands	31.62	
16	1	1	Lisa Mamié	Switzerland	31.69	

=== Final ===
The final was held on 17 August at 18:05.

Rank	Lane	Name	Nationality	Time	Notes
1st place, gold medalist(s)	4	Rūta Meilutytė	Lithuania	29.59	
2nd place, silver medalist(s)	5	Benedetta Pilato	Italy	29.71	
3rd place, bronze medalist(s)	3	Imogen Clark	Great Britain	30.31	
4	6	Arianna Castiglioni	Italy	30.43	
5	2	Veera Kivirinta	Finland	30.86	
6	8	Sophie Hansson	Sweden	31.02	
7	1	Mona McSharry	Ireland	31.15	
8	7	Florine Gaspard	Belgium	31.46	
