= 2022 FINA World Swimming Championships (25 m) – Women's 200 metre breaststroke =

Swimming competition

Women's 200 metre breaststroke at the 2022 FINA World Swimming Championships (25 m)
- Venue: Melbourne Sports and Aquatic Centre
- Location: Melbourne, Australia
- Dates: 16 December (heats and final)
- Competitors: 31 from 25 nations
- Winning time: 2:15.77 CR

Medalists
gold medal	Kate Douglass	United States
silver medal	Lilly King	United States
bronze medal	Tes Schouten	Netherlands

The Women's 200 metre breaststroke competition of the 2022 FINA World Swimming Championships (25 m) was held on 16 December 2022.

== Records ==
Prior to the competition, the existing world and championship records were as follows.

World record	Rebecca Soni (USA)	2:14.57	Manchester, United Kingdom	18 December 2009
Competition record	Rikke Moller Pedersen (DEN)	2:16.08	Istanbul, Turkey	16 December 2012

The following new records were set during this competition:

Date	Event	Name	Nationality	Time	Record
16 December	Final	Kate Douglass	United States	2:15.77	CR

== Results ==
=== Heats ===
The heats were started at 11:19.

Rank	Heat	Lane	Name	Nationality	Time	Notes
1	4	7	Kate Douglass	United States	2:16.52	Q
2	5	4	Lilly King	United States	2:18.59	Q
3	5	5	Tes Schouten	Netherlands	2:18.70	Q, NR
4	3	5	Sydney Pickrem	Canada	2:19.57	Q
4	4	5	Tang Qianting	China	2:19.57	Q
6	4	3	Jenna Strauch	Australia	2:19.75	Q
7	3	3	Thea Blomsterberg	Denmark	2:19.88	Q
8	3	4	Abbie Wood	Great Britain	2:20.26	Q
9	4	8	Lisa Mamié	Switzerland	2:20.45	NR
10	5	6	Kelsey Wog	Canada	2:20.57	
11	5	1	Mikayla Smith	Australia	2:20.67	
12	5	7	Yumeno Kusuda	Japan	2:20.82	
13	5	3	Kristýna Horská	Czech Republic	2:21.22	
14	2	7	Letitia Sim	Singapore	2:21.60	NR
15	3	2	Charlotte Bonnet	France	2:21.94	
16	2	3	Macarena Ceballos	Argentina	2:22.10	
17	4	1	Emelie Fast	Sweden	2:22.22	
18	2	2	Moon Su-a	South Korea	2:23.41	
19	3	8	Rebecca Meder	South Africa	2:23.64	
20	5	2	Andrea Podmaníková	Slovakia	2:24.12	
21	3	1	Nikoleta Trníková	Slovakia	2:24.62	
22	3	6	Yang Chang	China	2:24.80	
23	2	6	Maria Romanjuk	Estonia	2:25.53	
24	1	5	Nicole Frank	Uruguay	2:26.44	NR
25	2	1	Chang Yujuan	Hong Kong	2:26.76	
26	2	8	Phiangkhwan Pawapotako	Thailand	2:28.50	
27	2	5	Laura Lahtinen	Finland	2:28.80	
28	1	4	Nàdia Tudó	Andorra	2:31.45	
29	1	6	Asia Kent	Gibraltar	2:36.22	
30	1	3	Krista Jurado	Guatemala	2:36.34	
	5	8	Emily Visagie	South Africa	Disqualified	
	1	2	Ramudi Samarakoon	Sri Lanka	Did not start	
	2	4	Lena Kreundl	Austria	Did not start	
	3	7	Kotomi Kato	Japan	Did not start	
	4	2	Anna Elendt	Germany	Did not start	
	4	4	Sophie Hansson	Sweden	Did not start	
	4	6	Kotryna Teterevkova	Lithuania	Did not start	

=== Final ===
The final was held at 19:42.

Rank	Lane	Name	Nationality	Time	Notes
1st place, gold medalist(s)	4	Kate Douglass	United States	2:15.77	CR
2nd place, silver medalist(s)	5	Lilly King	United States	2:17.13	
3rd place, bronze medalist(s)	3	Tes Schouten	Netherlands	2:18.19	
4	7	Jenna Strauch	Australia	2:18.87	
5	2	Tang Qianting	China	2:19.28	
6	6	Sydney Pickrem	Canada	2:19.35	
7	1	Thea Blomsterberg	Denmark	2:20.14	
8	8	Abbie Wood	Great Britain	2:21.48	
