= Florine Gaspard =

Belgian swimmer (born 2001)

Personal information
- National team: Belgium
- Born: 28 December 2001 (age 24) Bastogne, Belgium

Sport
- Sport: Swimming
- Strokes: Breaststroke, Freestyle
- Club: CN Marseille
Medal record
Women's swimming
Representing Belgium
European Championships (SC)
Silver medal – second place	2025 Lublin	100 m breaststroke
Bronze medal – third place	2025 Lublin	50 m breaststroke

Florine Gaspard (born 28 December 2001) is a Belgian competitive swimmer specializing in sprint breaststroke events. She is the Belgian record holder in the long course and short course 50-metre breaststroke. She placed sixth in the final of the 50-metre breaststroke at the 2021 European Short Course Championships. At the 2022 European Aquatics Championships (long course), she placed eighth in the final of the 50-metre breaststroke. At the World Short Course Championships, she placed eleventh in the semifinals of the 50-metre breaststroke in 2021 and 2022.

== Background ==
Gaspard was born 28 December 2001 in Belgium. In 2022, she relocated from her hometown of Bastogne to Marseille, France to train with CN Marseille leading up to her appearance at the 2024 Summer Olympics, which were held in Paris, France.

== Career ==
=== 2018–2019 ===
Competing at the 2018 European Junior Swimming Championships, held in July in Helsinki, Finland, when she was 16 years of age, Gaspard placed twentieth in the 50-metre breaststroke with a time of 32.58 seconds, thirty-ninth with a time of 1:12.64 in 100-metre breaststroke, and fortieth in the 200-metre breaststroke with a time of 2:37.73. The following year, as a 17-year-old at the 2019 World University Games, with swimming competition conducted in July at Piscina Felice Scandone in Naples, Italy, she placed eighteenth in the 50-metre breaststroke with a time of 32.05 seconds, twenty-third in the 200-metre breaststroke with a 2:35.84, and thirty-second in both the 50 metre freestyle, with a time of 26.76 seconds, and the 100-metre breaststroke with a time of 1:11.79. Later in the year, at her first short course senior continental-scale Championships, the 2019 European Short Course Championships in December in Glasgow, Scotland when she was 18 years old, she placed twentieth in the 50-metre breaststroke with a 30.74, thirtieth in the 100-metre breaststroke with a 1:07.11, and thirty-ninth in the 50-metre freestyle with a time of 25.59 seconds.

=== 2021 ===
==== 2021 European Short Course Championships ====
On day one, 2 November, of the 2021 European Short Course Championships conducted at the Palace of Water Sports in Kazan, Russia, Gaspard placed twelfth in the semifinals of the 100-metre breaststroke with a personal best time of 1:05.58. Four days later, in the semifinals of the 50-metre breaststroke, she set her first Begian record with a personal best time of 29.70 seconds and advanced to the final ranking fourth. Day six of six, she competed in the first international championships final of her career, tying Klara Thormalm of Sweden for sixth-place in the final of the 50-metre breaststroke with a time of 30.17 seconds, which was 0.37 seconds behind bronze medalist Nika Godun of Russia.

Following her success at the European Short Course Championships, Gaspard competed at the long course 2021 French Winter National Championships in Montpellier, France, setting a new Belgian record in the 50-metre breaststroke with a personal best time of 30.56 seconds, which was 0.19 seconds faster than the former record of 30.75 seconds set by Fanny Lecluyse in 2015.

==== 2021 World Short Course Championships ====
The first day of the 2021 World Short Course Championships, contested starting 16 December at Etihad Arena in Abu Dhabi, United Arab Emirates, Gaspard tied Molly Renshaw of Great Britain for sixteenth-place in the preliminaries of the 50-metre breaststroke with a time of 30.45 seconds, which meant the two swimmers would need to compete in a swim-off to determine which one got to compete in the semifinals. In the swim-off, she lowered her time to 30.11 seconds, finishing 0.22 seconds ahead of Molly Renshaw to qualify for her first World Championships semifinal. Later in the day, in the evening semifinals session, she placed eleventh with a time of 30.10 seconds. Three days after that, she did not start competition in the 100-metre breaststroke.

=== 2022 ===
At the long course 2022 Belgian National Championships, held in April in Antwerp, Gaspard won three gold medals and national titles, the first in the 50-metre breaststroke and the second two in the 50-metre freestyle, with a personal best time of 25.80 seconds, and the 100-metre breaststroke with a time of 1:08.17.

==== 2022 World Aquatics Championships ====
Gaspard was named to the Team Belgium roster for the 2022 World Aquatics Championships, held starting in June at Danube Arena in Budapest, Hungary, in both sprint breaststroke events, the 50-metre breaststroke and the 100-metre breaststroke. It marked her first FINA World Aquatics Championships. In her first event, the 100-metre breaststroke starting on day two of pool swimming competition, she placed twenty-sixth overall with a time of 1:09.22. Five days later, in the preliminaries of the 50-metre breaststroke, her second and final event, she placed seventeenth with a time of 31.10 seconds, which was 1.33 seconds behind the first-ranked swimmer in the preliminary heats Lara van Niekerk of South Africa.

==== 2022 European Aquatics Championships ====
In August, Gaspard competed at her first LEN European Aquatics Championships, the 2022 European Aquatics Championships with pool swimming competition at Foro Italico in Rome, Italy. For her first event, the 100-metre breaststroke, she placed twenty-third in the preliminary heats with a time of 1:09.45 and did not qualify for the semifinals. Four days later, on the morning of 16 August, she ranked ninth in the preliminary heats of the 50-metre breaststroke with a time of 30.94 seconds and qualified for the semifinals. Later in the day, she achieved a 30.86 in the semifinals, qualifying for her first final at a LEN European Aquatics Championships and second final at a European Championships ranking sixth overall. The following day, she placed eighth in the final with a time of 31.46 seconds.

==== 2022 Swimming World Cup ====
For the 2022 FINA Swimming World Cup stop held in Berlin, Germany, Gaspard was one of ten athletes from CN Marseille who competed at the stop, entering to compete in five events, the 50-metre freestyle, 50-metre breaststroke, 100-metre breaststroke, 50-metre butterfly, and 100-metre individual medley. The first day of competition, 21 October, she achieved a placing of thirty-seventh in the 50-metre freestyle with a time of 25.60 seconds and a rank of fifteenth in the preliminaries of the 100-metre individual medley with a time of 1:00.96. Day two of three, she placed twenty-seventh in the 50-metre butterfly with a time of 26.96 seconds for her first event of the day, followed up by a twentieth-place in the 100-metre breaststroke with a time of 1:07.38. On the morning of day three, she qualified for the final of the 50-metre breaststroke with a rank of eighth and time of 30.48 seconds in the preliminary heats. In the evening final, she placed fourth with a time of 30.05 seconds, which was 0.02 seconds behind bronze medalist Anastasia Gorbenko of Israel and 1.45 seconds behind gold medalist Rūta Meilutytė of Lithuania.

==== 2022 World Short Course Championships ====
The morning of day two of the 2022 World Short Course Championships, held in December in Melbourne, Australia, Gaspard placed nineteenth in the 100 metre breaststroke with a near personal best time of 1:05.49, which was 0.04 seconds off her personal best time of 1:05.45. For the preliminaries of her second of two events, the 50 metre breaststroke beginning on day five, she achieved a time of 29.79 seconds and qualified for the semifinals ranking ninth overall. In the semifinals, she placed eleventh overall with a time of 29.98 seconds and did not advance to the final.

=== 2023 ===
2023 Belgian Championships
Gold medal – first place	50 m breaststroke	30.53 (NR)
Gold medal – first place	100 m breaststroke	1:07.95

At the 2023 Mediterranean Open Meet, conducted in March in long course metres in Marseille, France, Gaspard won the silver medal in the 100-metre breaststroke with a time of 1:08.02 and achieved a personal best time of 57.18 seconds in the 100-metre freestyle. She entered to compete in two individual events, the 50-metre breaststroke and 100-metre breaststroke, at the 2023 Belgian Open Championships in April. In the preliminaries of the 50-metre breaststroke on day one, 21 April, she ranked first with a 30.65 and qualified for the evening final. In the evening final, she won the national title with a Belgian record, personal best, and 2023 World Aquatics Championships qualifying time of 30.53 seconds. The following morning, she ranked first and qualified for the final of the 100-metre breaststroke with a 1:08.87 in the preliminaries. In the evening final, she won the national title with a time of 1:07.95.

Two months later, Gaspard won the gold medal in the 100 metre breaststroke at the 2023 French Elite Championships in Rennes, France, finishing in a personal best and 2023 World Aquatics Championships qualifying time of 1:07.21.

On 15 December Gaspard broke twice the national record for 50 metres freestyle and with a best of 24.65s qualified for the 2024 Summer Olympics in Paris.

== International championships (50 m) ==
Meet	50 freestyle	50 breaststroke	100 breaststroke	200 breaststroke
Junior level
EJC 2018 (age: 16)		20th (32.58)	39th (1:12.64)	40th (2:37.73)
Senior level
WUG 2019 (age: 17)	32nd (26.76)	18th (32.05)	32nd (1:11.79)	23rd (2:35.84)
WC 2022 (age: 20)		17th (31.10)	26th (1:09.22)	
EC 2022 (age: 20)		8th (31.46)	23rd (1:09.45)	

== International championships (25 m) ==
Meet	50 freestyle	50 breaststroke	100 breaststroke
EC 2019 (age: 17)	39th (25.59)	20th (30.74)	30th (1:07.11)
EC 2021 (age: 19)		6th (30.17)	12th (1:05.58)
WC 2021 (age: 19)		11th (30.10)	DNS
WC 2022 (age: 20)		11th (29.98)	19th (1:05.49)

== Personal best times ==
=== Long course metres (50 m pool) ===
Event	Time	Meet	Location	Date	Notes	Ref
50 m freestyle	24.65	Meeting National des Hortillons	Amiens, France	15 December 2023	NR	
50 m breaststroke	30.53	2023 Belgian Open Championships	Antwerp	21 April 2023	NR	
100 m breaststroke	1:07.21	2023 French Elite Championships	Rennes, France	14 June 2023		

Legend: NR – Belgian record;
Records not set in finals: h – heat; sf – semifinal; r – relay 1st leg; rh – relay heat 1st leg; b – B final; † – en route to final mark; so – swim-off; tt – time trial

=== Short course metres (25 m pool) ===
Event	Time		Meet	Location	Date	Notes	Ref
50 m breaststroke	29.70	sf	2021 European Short Course Championships	Kazan, Russia	6 November 2021	NR	
100 m breaststroke	1:03.61		2025 European Championships	Lublin, Poland	2 December 2025		

Legend: NR – Belgian record;
Records not set in finals: h – heat; sf – semifinal; r – relay 1st leg; rh – relay heat 1st leg; b – B final; † – en route to final mark; so – swim-off; tt – time trial

== National records ==
=== Long course metres (50 m pool) ===
No.	Event	Time	Meet	Location	Date	Status	Ref
1	50 m breaststroke	30.56	2021 French Winter National Championships	Montpellier, France	9 December 2021	Former	
2	50 m breaststroke (2)	30.53	2023 Belgian Open Championships	Antwerp	21 April 2023	Current	

=== Short course metres (25 m pool) ===
No.	Event	Time		Meet	Location	Date	Status	Ref
1	50 m breaststroke	29.70	sf	2021 European Short Course Championships	Kazan, Russia	6 November 2021	Current	

== Awards and honours ==
- Sports Merit of Bastogne, individual category: 2022
- Provincial Sports Merit: 2022 (#4)
