= Kayla van der Merwe =

British swimmer

Personal information
- National team: Great Britain
- Born: 15 November 2002 (age 23) Great Britain

Sport
- Sport: Swimming
- Strokes: Breaststroke
- Club: Poole, Winchester City Penguins (former)
Medal record
Women's swimming
Representing Great Britain
Event	1st	2nd	3rd
World Junior Championships	0	1	1
European Junior Championships	1	0	2
Total	1	1	3
World Junior Championships
Silver medal – second place	2019 Budapest	50 m breaststroke
Bronze medal – third place	2019 Budapest	100 m breaststroke
European Junior Championships
Gold medal – first place	2019 Kazan	100 m breaststroke
Bronze medal – third place	2019 Kazan	200 m breaststroke
Bronze medal – third place	2019 Kazan	4×100 m medley

Kayla van der Merwe (born 15 November 2002) is a British competitive swimmer. At the 2019 World Junior Championships, she won the silver medal in the 50 metre breaststroke and the bronze medal in the 100 metre breaststroke. She won the gold medal in the 100 metre breaststroke and bronze medals in the 200 metre breaststroke and 4×100 metre medley relay at the 2019 European Junior Championships.

== Background ==
Van der Merwe was born on 15 November 2002 in Great Britain. She trains in England and formerly competed for the Winchester City Penguins. She currently competes with the Poole swim club.

== Career ==
=== 2019 ===
==== 2019 European Junior Championships ====
In July 2019, Van der Merwe competed at the 2019 European Junior Swimming Championships, held in Kazan, Russia at the Palace of Water Sports, where she won the gold medal in the 100 metre breaststroke with a time of 1:07.12, the bronze medal in the 200 metre breaststroke in 2:26.55, a bronze medal in the 4×100 metre medley relay, where she split a 1:07.70 for the breaststroke leg of the relay in the final, and placed 4th in both the 50 metre breaststroke, with a 31.47, and the 4×100 metre mixed medley relay, splitting a 1:07.80 for the breaststroke leg of the relay.

==== 2019 World Junior Championships ====
2019 World Junior Championships
Silver medal – second place	50 m breaststroke	30.91
Bronze medal – third place	100 m breaststroke	1:07.06

At the 2019 World Junior Championships at Danube Arena in Budapest, Hungary, Van der Merwe won the silver medal in the 50 metre breaststroke with a personal best time of 30.91 seconds, which was 0.31 seconds slower than the gold medalist in the event, Benedetta Pilato of Italy. In the 100 metre breaststroke, she won the bronze medal and set a new British age group record with her time of 1:07.06 for the 16-year-old girls age group, finishing just 0.09 seconds behind silver medalist Kaitlyn Dobler of the United States and 0.04 seconds ahead of fourth-place finisher Anastasia Makarova of Russia. For her third and final individual event, Van der Merwe placed fourth in the final of the 200 metre breaststroke in 2:25.27, which was 0.28 seconds behind the bronze medalist in the event Mei Ishihara of Japan.

==== 2019 European Short Course Championships ====
The 2019 European Short Course Swimming Championships was the swimming competition at which Van der Merwe made her senior international debut. As part of the competition, held at Tollcross International Swimming Centre in December in Glasgow, Scotland, she placed 34th in the prelims heats of the 50 metre breaststroke with a time of 31.36 seconds. In the 100 metre breaststroke prelims heats, she swam a 1:06.83 and placed 24th overall. She placed 11th in the prelims heats of the 200 metre breaststroke with a 2:23.15. For the prelims heats of the 4×50 metre medley relay, she split a 31.01 for the breaststroke leg of the relay in the prelims heats, helping qualify the relay for the final ranking third. In the final, Siobhan-Marie O'Connor substituted in for Van der Merwe and the relay placed fifth in 1:45.65.

=== 2020–2022 ===
At the LEN Swimming Cup stop in Luxembourg in January 2020, Van der Merwe won a gold medal in the 100 metre breaststroke along with Matilde Schrøder of Denmark, who she tied, and a silver medal in the 200 metre breaststroke. In January 2021, Van der Merwe was named to the England Swimming Team in advance of the 2022 Commonwealth Games.

On the first day of the 2022 British Swimming Championships in early April, the selection meet for the 2022 Commonwealth Games, Van der Merwe tied for eleventh-rank in the preliminary heats of the 50 metre breaststroke with a time of 32.61 seconds, qualifying for the b-final. In the evening b-final she placed third, eleventh overall, with a time of 32.39 seconds. For the 200 metre breaststroke prelims heats on day two, she decided not to compete. The sixth and final day, she swam a 1:09.22 in the prelims heats of the 100 metre breaststroke, qualifying for the final ranking fourth. She swam a 1:08.83 in the final to place fourth, finishing over four-tenths of a second ahead of fifth-place finisher Abbie Wood and 1.31 seconds behind first-place finisher Kara Hanlon. In July, at the 2022 British Summer Swimming Championships, she improved upon her time and placing in the 50 metre breaststroke from April, winning the bronze medal with a time of 32.31 seconds.

=== 2023 ===
At the 2023 Australian Swimming Trials in Melbourne, Australia, Van der Merwe ranked sixth in the preliminaries of the 100 metre breaststroke on day two with a 1:10.03 and qualified for the evening final. She went on to place second in the b-final with a time of 1:09.40.

== International championships ==
Meet	50 breaststroke	100 breaststroke	200 breaststroke	4×50 medley relay	4×100 medley relay	4×100 mixed medley relay
Junior level
EJC 2019 (age: 16)	4th (31.47)	(gold) (1:07.12)	(bronze) (2:26.55)	—N/a	(bronze) (split 1:07.70, br leg)	4th (split 1:07.80, br leg)
WJC 2019 (age: 16)	(silver) (30.91)	(bronze) (1:07.06)	4th (2:25.27)	—N/a		
Senior level
ESC 2019 (age: 17)	34th (31.36)	24th (1:06.83)	11th (2:23.15)	5th^{[a]} (split 31.01, br leg)	—N/a	—N/a

^{a} Van der Merwe swam only in the prelims heats.

== Personal best times ==
=== Long course metres (50 m pool) ===
Event	Time	Meet	Location	Date	Age	Ref
50 m breaststroke	30.91	2019 World Junior Championships	Budapest, Hungary	21 August 2019	16	
100 m breaststroke	1:07.06	2019 World Junior Championships	Budapest, Hungary	23 August 2019	16	
200 m breaststroke	2:25.27	2019 World Junior Championships	Budapest, Hungary	25 August 2019	16	

=== Short course metres (25 m pool) ===
Event	Time		Meet	Location	Date	Age	Ref
50 m breaststroke	31.36	h	2019 European Short Course Championships	Glasgow, Scotland	4 December 2019	17	
100 m breaststroke	1:06.06		2019 Manchester International	Manchester	20 October 2019	16	
200 m breaststroke	2:22.10		2019 International Swimming League	London	23 November 2019	17	

Legend: h – heat

== Awards and honours ==
- Swim England, Talent Athlete of the Year (Swimming): 2019
