= Matilde Schrøder =

Danish swimmer (born 1996)

Personal information
- National team: Denmark
- Born: 23 March 1996 (age 30)

Sport
- Sport: Swimming
- Strokes: Breaststroke
Medal record
Women's swimming
Representing Denmark
World Championships (SC)
Bronze medal – third place	2016 Windsor	4x50 m medley

Matilde Schrøder (born 23 March 1996) is a Danish swimmer. She won a bronze medal at the 2016 World Championships in the 4x50 m medley and represented Denmark at the 2019 World Aquatics Championships.

== Career ==
At the 2014 Danish Short Course Championships, Schrøder won a bronze medal in the 100 metre breaststroke, behind Moniek Nijhuis and Moeller Pedersen.

Schrøder won the 50 metre breaststroke at the 2016 Danish Open. She then competed at the 2016 FINA World Championships. She finished 28th in the heats of the 100 metre breaststroke. She finished 30th in the heats of the 50 metre breaststroke. She competed with Mie Nielsen, Emilie Beckmann, and Jeanette Ottesen in the 4 × 50 metre medley relay, and they won the bronze medal.

Schrøder won the 100 metre breaststroke at the 2018 FFN Golden Tour Camille-Muffat Sarcelles. She then competed at the 2018 European Aquatics Championships. In the 50 metre breaststroke, she finished 14th in the heats and 7th in the semifinals. In the 100 metre breaststroke, she finished 15th in the heats and 8th in the semifinals.

Schrøder competed at the 2019 World Aquatics Championships. In the 50 metre breaststroke, she finished 27th in the heats. In the 100 metre breaststroke, she finished 29th in the heats. She competed with Mie Nielsen, Jeanette Ottesen, and Julie Kepp Jensen in the 4 × 100 metre medley relay where they finished 16th in the heats. She then won the 100 metre breaststroke at the 2019 Danish Open Short Course Championships with a personal best time of 1:05.92.

At the LEN Swimming Cup stop in Luxembourg in January 2020, Schrøder tied with Kayla van der Merwe for the gold medal in the 100 metre breaststroke.
