= Benedetta Pilato =

Italian swimmer (born 2005)

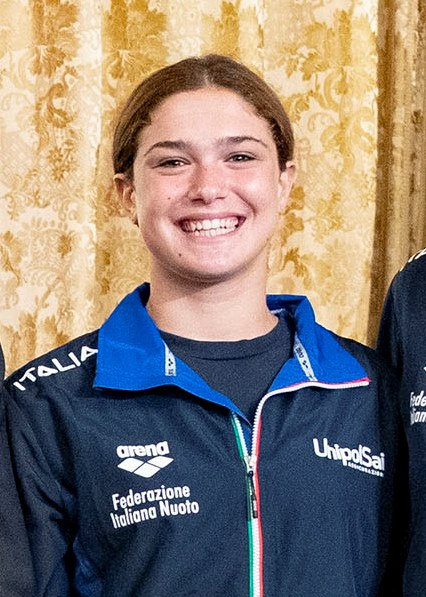
- Pilato in 2019

Personal information
- National team: Italy
- Born: 28 January 2005 (age 21) Taranto, Italy
- Height: 1.70 m (5 ft 7 in)
- Weight: 65 kg (143 lb)

Sport
- Sport: Swimming
- Strokes: Breaststroke
- Club: Circolo Canottieri Aniene
Medal record
Women's swimming
Representing Italy
Senior level
Event	1st	2nd	3rd
World Championships (LC)	1	2	3
World Championships (SC)	0	1	1
European Championships (LC)	2	3	1
European Championships (SC)	2	4	0
Mediterranean Games	1	0	0
Total	6	10	5
Junior
Event	1st	2nd	3rd
World Junior Championships	1	0	0
European Junior Championships	2	1	0
Total	3	1	0
Senior level
World Championships (LC)
Gold medal – first place	2022 Budapest	100 m breaststroke
Silver medal – second place	2019 Gwangju	50 m breaststroke
Silver medal – second place	2022 Budapest	50 m breaststroke
Bronze medal – third place	2023 Fukuoka	50 m breaststroke
Bronze medal – third place	2024 Doha	50 m breaststroke
Bronze medal – third place	2025 Singapore	50 m breaststroke
World Championships (SC)
Silver medal – second place	2021 Abu Dhabi	50 m breaststroke
Bronze medal – third place	2021 Abu Dhabi	4×50 m mixed medley
European Championships (LC)
Gold medal – first place	2020 Budapest	50 m breaststroke
Gold medal – first place	2022 Rome	100 m breaststroke
Silver medal – second place	2022 Rome	50 m breaststroke
Silver medal – second place	2026 Paris	50 m breaststroke
Silver medal – second place	2026 Paris	4×100 m medley
Bronze medal – third place	2026 Paris	100 m breaststroke
European Championships (SC)
Gold medal – first place	2019 Glasgow	50 m breaststroke
Gold medal – first place	2023 Otopeni	50 m breaststroke
Silver medal – second place	2019 Glasgow	4×50 m medley
Silver medal – second place	2021 Kazan	50 m breaststroke
Silver medal – second place	2023 Otopeni	100 m breaststroke
Silver medal – second place	2023 Otopeni	4×50 m medley
Mediterranean Games
Gold medal – first place	2026 Taranto	100 m breaststroke
Junior level
World Junior Championships
Gold medal – first place	2019 Budapest	50 m breaststroke
European Junior Championships
Gold medal – first place	2019 Kazan	50 m breaststroke
Gold medal – first place	2021 Rome	50 m breaststroke
Silver medal – second place	2019 Kazan	4×100 m medley relay

Benedetta Pilato (born 28 January 2005) is an Italian swimmer. She is the European champion in the 50 metre breaststroke in 2021 and the 100 metre breaststroke in 2022 as well as the silver medalist in the 50 metre breaststroke in 2022. In 2021, she won a silver medal in the 50 metre breaststroke at the 2021 World Short Course Championships. She is the world champion in the 100 metre breaststroke and the silver medal in the 50 metre breaststroke at the 2022 World Aquatics Championships.

== Career ==
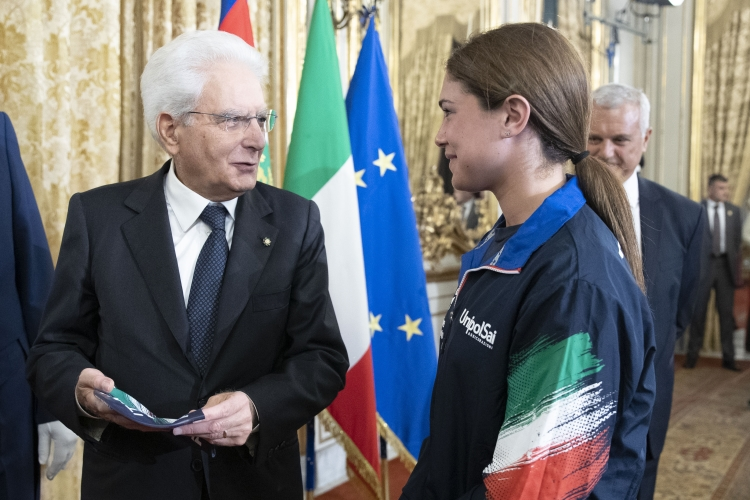
Pilato and the Italian President Sergio Mattarella in 2019 in Quirinale.

=== 2019–2020: World Championships silver medalist at 14 years of age ===
==== 2019 European Junior Championships ====
On 3 July, at the 2019 European Junior Swimming Championships held in Kazan, Russia, Pilato won the gold medal in the 50 metre breaststroke with a Championships record time of 30.16 seconds, finishing over one full second ahead of silver medalist Kotryna Teterevkova of Lithuania and Anastasia Makarova of Russia. Two days later, she won a silver medal in the 4×100 metre medley relay, contributing a split of 1:07.70 for the breaststroke leg of the relay to the final time of 4:05.66. In the final of the 4×100 metre mixed medley relay the next day, she helped achieve a fifth-place finish in 3:55.49, splitting a 1:10.15 for the breaststroke leg of the relay. For her fourth and final event, on 7 July, she placed fifth in the 100 metre breaststroke with a time of 1:08.22.

==== 2019 World Aquatics Championships ====
Pilato competed in the women's 50 metre breaststroke at the 2019 World Aquatics Championships, winning the silver medal, at the age of 14.

On 27 July 2019, at the beginning of the senior national team, at the 2019 World Championships in Gwangju, South Korea, she entered the final of the 50 breaststroke with the third best time (30.17), after setting the new Italian record and winning her heat in 29.98, beating her previous record set at the Settecolli Trophy (30.13). The next day, she placed second in the final with a time of 30.00 seconds, finishing 0.16 seconds behind gold medalist Lilly King of the United States and 0.15 seconds ahead of bronze medalist Yuliya Yefimova of Russia.

==== 2019 World Junior Championships ====
The month following the senior World Championships, Pilato competed at the 2019 FINA World Junior Swimming Championships, held in Budapest, Hungary, where she won the world junior title and gold medal in the 50 metre breaststroke with a time of 30.60 seconds, finishing over three-tenths of a second ahead of silver medalist Kayla van der Merwe of Great Britain and bronze medalist Kaitlyn Dobler of the United States. She also placed sixth in the 100 metre breaststroke with a time of 1:08.21 and fourth in the 4×100 metre medley relay with a final time of 4:05.29.

==== 2019 European Short Course Championships ====
In December, at the 2019 European Short Course Swimming Championships held in Glasgow, Scotland, Pilato won the gold medal in the 50 metre breaststroke in a world junior record time of 29.32 seconds, after setting world junior records in the preliminaries heats, at 29.62 seconds, and the semifinals, at 29.48 seconds. She also won a silver medal as part of the 4×100 metre medley relay, splitting a 29.18 for the breaststroke leg of the relay in the final, and placed thirteenth in the preliminaries of the 100 metre breaststroke with a 1:06.07, where she did not advance to the semifinals as she was not one of the two fastest swimmers representing Italy.

==== 2020 Italian National Championships ====
In December 2020, at 15 years of age, Pilato set a world junior record in the long course 50 metre breaststroke at the 2020 Italian Winter National Swimming Championships, in Riccione, with a time of 29.61 seconds. The following month, she was the recipient of SwimSwam's World Junior Female Swimmer of the Year award for the year 2020.

=== 2021: 16-year-old world record setter in 50 metre breaststroke ===
In April 2021, at the Italian National Swimming Championships, Pilato achieved a spot on the 2020 Olympic Team for Italy in the 100 metre breaststroke.

==== 2020 European Aquatics Championships ====
In May 2021, at the 2020 European Aquatics Championships, conducted in long course metres and held in Budapest, Hungary, Pilato tied Sophie Hansson of Sweden for third-rank in the preliminaries of the 100 metre breaststroke with a time of 1:06.34 and did not advance to the semifinals as she was not one of the two fastest Italian swimmers. Four days later, she set a new world junior record in the preliminaries of the 50 metre breaststroke with a time of 29.50 seconds, lowering the former record she set in December by 0.09 seconds, setting a new Championships record, and qualifying for the semifinals ranking first. Later in the day, in the evening semifinals, she set a new world record, world junior record, and Championships record at 16 years, 114 days of age with a time of 29.30 seconds, breaking the former record of 29.40 seconds set by Lilly King in 2017, and qualifying her to the final ranking first. In the final the following day, she won the gold medal and European title with a time of 29.35 seconds, finishing 0.84 seconds ahead of silver medalist Ida Hulkko of Finland.

==== 2021 European Junior Championships ====
At the 2021 European Junior Swimming Championships, held in early July in Rome, Pilato won the gold medal in the 50 metre breaststroke with a time of 30.13 seconds, and contributed a split of 1:06.58 for the breaststroke leg of the 4×100 metre mixed medley relay in the preliminaries before being substituted out and Simone Cerasuolo substituted in for the finals relay, which went on to be disqualified while swimming.

==== 2020 Summer Olympics ====
At the 2020 Summer Olympics in Tokyo, Japan, Pilato entered as the number six seed in the 100 metre breaststroke, in the prelims round of competition on 25 July 2021, she was disqualified and did not advance to the semifinals round of competition. The reason for Pilato's disqualification was that she did not move her feet on the same horizontal plane during her kicks, which is also known as a scissor kick.

==== International Swimming League ====
Pilato was selected to compete on team Energy Standard for the 2021 International Swimming League.

==== 2021 European Short Course Championships ====
Leading up to the 2021 European Short Course Swimming Championships held at the Palace of Water Sports in Kazan, Russia in November, Pilato was highlighted as a competitor to watch in one of the top five female races, the 100 metre breaststroke, by SwimSwam. Pilato won her prelims heat in the 100 metre breaststroke on day one of competition, 2 November, with a time of 1:05.23 and ranked fourth amongst Italian swimmers, sixth overall. As Pilato was the fourth fastest Italian across all prelims heats of the event, she did not advance to the semifinals since only the two fastest swimmers in the prelims heats from a country were eligible for the semifinals. On the fifth day, she swam a 29.62 in the prelims heats of the 50 metre breaststroke and qualified for the semifinals ranked first. Later in the day, she swam a 29.67 in the semifinals, ranked second overall, and advanced to the final of the event the next day. On the last day of competition, Pilato won her first medal of the competition, a silver medal in the 50 metre breaststroke with a time of 29.75 seconds in the final.

==== 2021 World Short Course Championships ====
Pilato entered to compete in one individual event at the 2021 World Short Course Championships in Abu Dhabi, United Arab Emirates, the 50 metre breaststroke. In the prelims heats of the event, she ranked third overall with a time of 29.73 seconds and qualified for the semifinals. Pilato qualified for the final of the 50 metre breaststroke with a time of 29.76 seconds in the semifinals, ranking fourth overall. In the final, Pilato won the silver medal with a time of 29.50 seconds, finishing less than two-tenths of a second behind gold medalist Anastasia Gorbenko of Israel. Pilato split a 29.78 for the breaststroke leg of the 4×50 metre mixed medley relay in the prelims heats on day three, helping advance the relay to the final ranking fourth. The finals relay, on which Nicolò Martinenghi substituted for Pilato, placed third and she won a bronze medal for her prelims contributions.

=== 2022: World and European champion in 100 metre breaststroke ===
==== 2022 World Aquatics Championships ====
At the 2022 World Aquatics Championships in Budapest, Hungary, she won the gold medal in the 100 metre breaststroke at 17 years of age, swimming a time of 1:05.93 in the final to finish five-hundredths of a second ahead of silver medalist Anna Elendt of Germany. In the 50 metre breaststroke, she won the silver medal with a time of 29.80 seconds, which was one-tenth of a second slower than gold medalist Rūta Meilutytė of Lithuania and one-tenth of a second faster than bronze medalist Lara van Niekerk of South Africa. For the 4×100 metre medley relay, she split a 1:07.00 for the breaststroke leg of the relay in the final to help achieve a seventh-place finish.

==== 2022 European Aquatics Championships ====
On the third day of the 2022 European Aquatics Championships, held in Rome in August, Pilato won the gold medal in the 100 metre breaststroke with a time of 1:05.97. Four days later, in the 50 metre breaststroke, she finished in a time of 29.71 seconds and won the silver medal. Later in the same session, she split a 1:05.65 for the breaststroke leg of the 4×100 metre medley relay in the final, helping place fourth and finish less than three-tenths of a second behind the team from the Netherlands that won the bronze medal.

==== 2022 World Short Course Championships ====
For the 2022 World Short Course Championships, held in December in Melbourne, Australia, Pilato placed fifteenth in the first of her two individuals events, the 100 metre breaststroke, on the second day of competition with a time of 1:05.46 in the semifinals that did not qualify her to the final. For her second and final event, the 50 metre breaststroke, she improved upon her placing, this time finishing seventh in the final on day six with a time of 29.48 seconds, which was less than one second behind the first-place finisher and less than four-tenths of a second behind the second-place finisher.

== World records ==
Long course metres (50 m pool)

No.	Event	Time		Meet	Venue	Date	Age	Notes	Ref
1	50 m breaststroke	29.30	sf	2020 European Aquatics Championships	(Hungary) Budapest	22 May 2021	16 years, 114 days	also WJ	

Legend: WJ – World junior record; sf – semifinal

== Personal bests ==
Long course metres (50 m pool)

Event	Time		Meet	Venue	Date	Notes	Ref
50 m breaststroke	29.30	sf	2020 European Aquatics Championships	(Hungary) Budapest	22 May 2021	WR WJ ER EJ CR NR	
100 m breaststroke	1:05.70		2022 Italian National Spring Championships	(Italy) Riccione	9 April 2022		

Legend: WR – World record; ER – European record; NR – Italian record; WJ – World junior record; EJ – European junior record; CR – Championships record;
Records not set in finals: h – heat; sf – semifinal; r – relay 1st leg; rh – relay heat 1st leg; b – B final; † – en route to final mark; so – swim-off; tt – time trial

Short course metres (25 m pool)

Event	Time	Meet	Venue	Date	Notes	Ref
50 m breaststroke	28.81	2020 International Swimming League	(Hungary) Budapest	21 November 2020	WJ NR	
100 m breaststroke	1:03.55	2020 International Swimming League	(Hungary) Budapest	15 November 2020	NR	

Legend: NR – Italian record; WJ – World junior record;
Records not set in finals: h – heat; sf – semifinal; r – relay 1st leg; rh – relay heat 1st leg; b – B final; † – en route to final mark; so – swim-off; tt – time trial

== International championships ==
Long course metres (50 m pool)

Meet	50 breaststroke	100 breaststroke	4×100 medley	4×100 mixed medley
Junior level
EJC 2019	1st place, gold medalist(s)	5th	2nd place, silver medalist(s)	5th
WJC 2019	1st place, gold medalist(s)	6th	4th	
EJC 2021	1st place, gold medalist(s)			DSQ^{[a]}^{[b]}
Senior level
WC 2019	2nd place, silver medalist(s)			
EC 2020	1st place, gold medalist(s)	3rd (h)		
OG 2020		DSQ		
WC 2022	2nd place, silver medalist(s)	1st place, gold medalist(s)	7th	
EC 2022	2nd place, silver medalist(s)	1st place, gold medalist(s)	4th	
WC 2023	3rd place, bronze medalist(s)			
OG 2024		4th		

^{a} Pilato swam only in the heats.
^{b} Pilato was not a member of the relay disqualified in the final.

Short course metres (25 m pool)

Meet	50 breaststroke	100 breaststroke	4×50 medley	4×50 mixed medley
EC 2019	1st place, gold medalist(s)	13th (h)	2nd place, silver medalist(s)	
EC 2021	2nd place, silver medalist(s)	6th (h)		
WC 2021	2nd place, silver medalist(s)			(bronze) (h)^{[a]}
WC 2022	7th	15th		
EC 2023	1st place, gold medalist(s)	2nd place, silver medalist(s)		

^{a} Pilato swam only in the heats.

== Awards and honours ==
- SwimSwam Swammy Award, World Junior Female Swimmer of the Year: 2020
- SwimSwam Top 100 (Women's): 2021 (#32), 2022 (#25)

== Personal life ==
In 2025, Pilato and fellow swimmer Chiara Tarantino were detained at Changi Airport in Singapore after surveillance footage showed them taking perfumes from a shop without paying. They underwent several hours of questioning and searches, which revealed that Tarantino had placed the items in Pilato's luggage. Following intervention by the Italian Embassy in Singapore, they were moved to a hotel and later permitted to leave Singapore a few days afterwards, having received a warning and a repatriation document while their passports were temporarily confiscated.

== See also ==
- Italy national swimming team – Women multiple medalists
- 50 m breaststroke – Women long course all-time top 25

Records
Preceded by (United States) Lilly King	Women's 50-meter breaststroke world record-holder (long course); 22 May 2021 – present	Succeeded by Incumbent
