= Tes Schouten =

Dutch swimmer (born 2000)

Personal information
- Nationality: Dutch
- Born: 31 December 2000 (age 25) Bodegraven, Netherlands

Sport
- Sport: Swimming
- Strokes: Breaststroke
Medal record
Women's swimming
Representing the Netherlands
Olympic Games
Bronze medal – third place	2024 Paris	200 m breaststroke
World Championships (LC)
Gold medal – first place	2024 Doha	200 m breaststroke
Silver medal – second place	2024 Doha	100 m breaststroke
Bronze medal – third place	2023 Fukuoka	200 m breaststroke
World Championships (SC)
Silver medal – second place	2022 Melbourne	100 m breaststroke
Bronze medal – third place	2022 Melbourne	200 m breaststroke
European Championships (LC)
Bronze medal – third place	2022 Rome	4×100 m medley
European Games
Silver medal – second place	2015 Baku	4×100 m medley
European Junior Championships
Silver medal – second place	2017 Netanya	100 m breaststroke

Tes Schouten (born 31 December 2000) is a Dutch swimmer. She competed in the women's 100 metre breaststroke at the 2019 World Aquatics Championships.

In 2017, she won the silver medal in the girls' 100 metre breaststroke at the 2017 European Junior Swimming Championships held in Netanya, Israel.

== Personal bests ==
Short course
Event	Time	Date	Location
50 m breaststroke	30.21	2020-10-18	Amsterdam, Netherlands
100 m breaststroke	1:03.90NR	2022-12-15	Melbourne, Australia
200 m breaststroke	2:18.19NR	2022-12-16	Melbourne, Australia

Long course
Event	Time	Date	Location
50 m breaststroke	30.97	2019-04-07	The Hague, Netherlands
100 m breaststroke	1:05.71NR	2023-04-09	Eindhoven, Netherlands
200 m breaststroke	2:21.71NR	2023-06-09	Amersfoort, Netherlands
