= Rūta Meilutytė =

Lithuanian swimmer (born 1997)

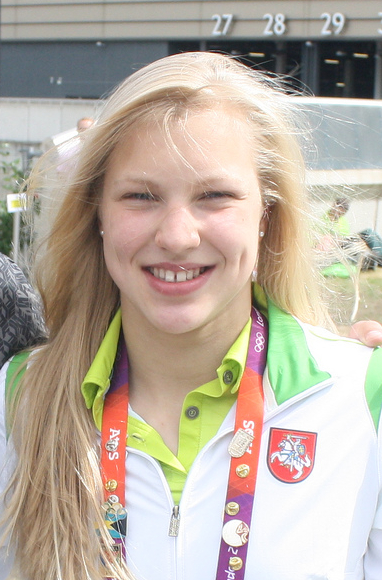
- Meilutytė at 2012 Summer Olympics

Personal information
- National team: Lithuania
- Born: 19 March 1997 (age 29) Kaunas, Lithuania
- Height: 1.73 m (5 ft 8 in)
- Weight: 74 kg (163 lb)

Sport
- Sport: Swimming
- Strokes: Breaststroke, freestyle
- Coach: Tadas Duškinas
Medal record
Women's swimming
Representing Lithuania
Senior level
Event	1st	2nd	3rd
Olympic Games	1	0	0
World Championships (LC)	6	2	1
World Championships (SC)	5	3	0
European Championships (LC)	4	1	1
European Championships (SC)	5	1	0
Total	21	7	2
Junior
Event	1st	2nd	3rd
Youth Olympic Games	2	0	0
World Junior Championships	4	2	0
European Junior Championships	1	1	0
European Youth Olympic Festival	1	1	1
Total	8	4	1
Senior level
Olympic Games
Gold medal – first place	2012 London	100 m breaststroke
World Championships (LC)
Gold medal – first place	2013 Barcelona	100 m breaststroke
Gold medal – first place	2022 Budapest	50 m breaststroke
Gold medal – first place	2023 Fukuoka	50 m breaststroke
Gold medal – first place	2023 Fukuoka	100 m breaststroke
Gold medal – first place	2024 Doha	50 m breaststroke
Gold medal – first place	2025 Singapore	50 m breaststroke
Silver medal – second place	2013 Barcelona	50 m breaststroke
Silver medal – second place	2015 Kazan	100 m breaststroke
Bronze medal – third place	2022 Budapest	100 m breaststroke
World Championships (SC)
Gold medal – first place	2012 Istanbul	50 m breaststroke
Gold medal – first place	2012 Istanbul	100 m breaststroke
Gold medal – first place	2014 Doha	50 m breaststroke
Gold medal – first place	2022 Melbourne	50 m breaststroke
Gold medal – first place	2024 Budapest	50 m breaststroke
Silver medal – second place	2012 Istanbul	100 m medley
Silver medal – second place	2014 Doha	100 m breaststroke
Silver medal – second place	2018 Hangzhou	50 m breaststroke
European Championships (LC)
Gold medal – first place	2014 Berlin	50 m breaststroke
Gold medal – first place	2016 London	100 m breaststroke
Gold medal – first place	2022 Rome	50 m breaststroke
Gold medal – first place	2026 Paris	50 m breaststroke
Silver medal – second place	2018 Glasgow	100 m breaststroke
Bronze medal – third place	2022 Rome	100 m breaststroke
European Championships (SC)
Gold medal – first place	2013 Herning	50 m breaststroke
Gold medal – first place	2013 Herning	100 m breaststroke
Gold medal – first place	2013 Herning	100 m medley
Gold medal – first place	2017 Copenhagen	50 m breaststroke
Gold medal – first place	2017 Copenhagen	100 m breaststroke
Silver medal – second place	2025 Lublin	50 m breaststroke
Junior level
Youth Olympic Games
Gold medal – first place	2014 Nanjing	50 m breaststroke
Gold medal – first place	2014 Nanjing	100 m breaststroke
World Junior Championships
Gold medal – first place	2013 Dubai	50 m freestyle
Gold medal – first place	2013 Dubai	50 m breaststroke
Gold medal – first place	2013 Dubai	100 m breaststroke
Gold medal – first place	2013 Dubai	200 m medley
Silver medal – second place	2013 Dubai	100 m freestyle
Silver medal – second place	2013 Dubai	4×100 m mixed medley
European Junior Championships
Gold medal – first place	2013 Poznań	100 m breaststroke
Silver medal – second place	2013 Poznań	50 m freestyle
European Youth Olympic Festival
Gold medal – first place	2011 Trabzon	100 m breaststroke
Silver medal – second place	2011 Trabzon	50 m freestyle
Bronze medal – third place	2011 Trabzon	100 m freestyle
- Grand Cross of Order for Merits to Lithuania

Rūta Meilutytė Lithuanian pronunciation: [ruːˈtɐ mʲɛɪ̯ɫʊˈtʲi̇̂ːtʲeː]; (born 19 March 1997) is a Lithuanian swimmer. She is an Olympian gold medallist, the current world record holder in the short course 50 metre breaststroke, 100 metre breaststroke and long course 50 metre breaststroke. She is a former world record holder in the long course 100 metre breaststroke.

At the age of 15, Meilutytė, based in Britain at Plymouth College and the associated Plymouth Leander Swimming Club under the guidance of a coaching team led by Jon Rudd, had already broken eleven Lithuanian women's swimming records. At the 2011 European Youth Summer Olympic Festival in Trabzon, she won the gold medal in the 100m breaststroke, a silver in the 50m freestyle and a bronze in the 100m freestyle. At the 2012 Summer Olympics in London, Meilutytė won the gold medal in the women's 100 metre breaststroke with a time of 1:05.47. At age 15, she was also the youngest Lithuanian athlete to win an Olympic gold medal.

In 2013 Meilutytė broke her own European record by 0.01 of a second. Meilutytė competed at the 2013 World Aquatics Championships in Barcelona and achieved world records in the 50 and 100 metre breaststroke. At the age of 17 she became the first swimmer in history to win all available junior and senior international swimming championships at least once.

From July 2019 to July 2021, Meilutytė served a 24-month suspension for anti-doping rule violations between April 2018 and March 2019. She returned to national competition in December 2021.

== Early and personal life ==
Meilutytė was born in Kaunas, Lithuania, on 19 March 1997, the daughter of Saulius Meilutis and Ingrida Meilutienė. Meilutytė has two older brothers, Margiris (age 26 as of 2018), who is a law student, and Mindaugas (age 30 as of 2018). Meilutytė began swimming at the age of seven. Although not particularly tall, she has had size 43 feet (EU) since she was 13 years old. Meilutytė went to Kaunas "Milikoniai" middle-school from ages 6–13.

In 2025, she told the BBC's Panorama that she had been bullied "left broken" by her former coach, Jon Rudd, and that his "toxic training environment and controlling food culture" had contributed to Meilutytė developing depression and an eating disorder.

== Career ==
=== Early career ===
In 2011, she broke her first Lithuanian swimming record in the women's 50m and 100 meters breaststroke.

=== 2012: Olympic and double World champion at 15 years of age ===
==== 2012 Summer Olympics ====
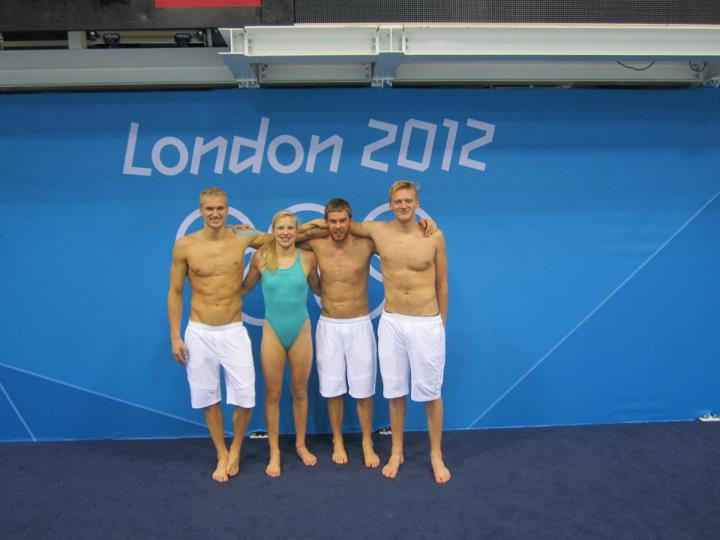
Rūta at the 2012 Summer Olympics with the Lithuanian swim team.

After earning selection to compete at the 2012 Summer Olympics, Rūta Meilutytė became the youngest Lithuanian swimmer to compete at the modern Olympic Games. In her first event, the 100 metre breaststroke heats, Meilutytė placed first, with a time of 1:05.56, and broke the national Lithuanian swimming record for the 100 metre breaststroke. At the 100 metre breaststroke semi-finals, Meilutytė also placed first, by breaking her previously set Lithuanian swimming record and she also broke the women's 100 metre breaststroke European record, with a time of 1:05.21. She then won the gold medal in the final with a time of 1:05.47, at 15 years, 133 days of age. Meilutytė also competed in the 50m freestyle, where she failed to progress to the semi-final despite winning her heat and setting a new national record of 25.55 seconds, and the 100m freestyle.

During the 41st European Olympic Committees (EOC) General Assembly, Meilutytė was named 2012 best European young athlete of the year.

==== 2012 World Swimming Championships ====
At the 2012 FINA World Swimming Championships (25 m) in Istanbul, Turkey, Meilutytė competed in four events: 50 metre breaststroke, 100 metre breaststroke, 100 metre freestyle and 100 metre individual medley.

In her first event, 50 metre breaststroke heats, Meilutytė placed first, with a time of 29.56 seconds, and broke the national Lithuanian swimming record, European record and Championship record for the women's 50 metre breaststroke (short-course). In the 50 metre breaststroke semi-finals, Meilutytė also placed first, by breaking the same records again, with a time of 29.51 seconds. During the 50 metre breaststroke final, she won the gold medal, by beating Alia Atkinson (29.62) and Jessica Hardy (29.82) with a time of 29.44 seconds and for the third time broke all three records for the women's 50 metre breaststroke (short-course).

At the 100 metre freestyle, where she progressed to the semi-final by placing 5th in her heat and setting a new national record of 53.54 seconds. Due to the fact that the semi-finals of women's 100 metre freestyle were held just 19 minutes before the 50 metre breaststroke final, Meilutytė withdrew from the 100 metre freestyle semi-finals because of the schedule being too tight.

Meilutytė also competed in the 100 metre individual medley. During the 100 metre individual medley heats, Meilutytė placed second and set a new national record of 59.33 seconds. In the 100 metre individual medley semi-finals she placed third and again set a new national record of 59.15 seconds. In the final of the same event, Meilutytė won the silver medal and for the third time set a new national record of 58.79 seconds.

On the third day of the Championships, Meilutytė competed in 100 metre breaststroke heats, where she placed first and set a new national record of 1:04.69. At the 100 metre breaststroke semi-finals she placed second, with a time of 1:04.81. On 15 December, Meilutytė competed in her last event of the 2012 FINA World Swimming Championships – the 100 metre breaststroke finals, and won her second gold medal in this championship, with a time of 1:03.52, and broke the national Lithuanian swimming record, European record and Championship record (which was previously held by Rebecca Soni) for the women's 100 metre breaststroke (short-course).

During this championship, Meilutytė broke various national Lithuanian swimming records nine times, European – four times and Championship records also four times.

=== 2013: Three world records as a 16-year-old ===
==== 2013 World Aquatics championships ====
At the 2013 World Aquatics Championships in Barcelona, Spain, Meilutytė has competed in three events: 50 metre breaststroke, 100 metre breaststroke and 100 metre freestyle. On 29 July 2013, Meilutytė competed in her first event – the 100 metre breaststroke heats, where she placed first with a time of 1:04.52, and broke the national Lithuanian swimming record, European record and Championship record for the 100 metre breaststroke (long course). On the same day in the 100 metre breaststroke semi-finals Meilutytė broke the World record in 100 metre breaststroke, finishing with a time of 1:04.35 seconds and becoming the first record-holder of the championships and the first Lithuanian athlete to break a swimming world record since Lithuania gained independence from the Soviet Union in 1990. During the 100 metre breaststroke final, she won the gold medal, by beating Yuliya Efimova (1:05.02) and Jessica Hardy (1:05.52) with a time of 1:04.42.

Meilutytė also competed in the 100 metre freestyle, where she finished with a time of 55.72 and failed to progress to the semi-final. She also was scheduled to compete in the 50 metre freestyle, but did not start because wanted to concentrate on her next event – 50 metre breaststroke.

In 50 metre breaststroke heats, Meilutytė placed third, with a time of 30.07. On the same day, during the 50 metre breaststroke semi-finals, Meilutytė placed first, with a time of 29.48, and broke world record in 50 metre breaststroke, which was previously held by Yuliya Yefimova, who broke it in the 50 metre breaststroke heats on the same day before. On the next and the last day of the championships, Meilutytė competed in 50 metre breaststroke final, where she won the silver medal with a time of 29.59.

==== 2013 World Junior Swimming Championships ====
At the 2013 FINA World Junior Swimming Championships in Dubai, United Arab Emirates, Meilutytė competed in eight events: 50 metre freestyle, 100 metre freestyle, 50 metre breaststroke, 100 metre breaststroke, 50 metre backstroke, 50 metre butterfly, 200 metre individual medley and 4×100 metre mixed medley.

In her first event, 50 metre breaststroke heats, Meilutytė qualified to the semi-final with a time of 31.10 seconds and broke Championship record. In the 50 metre breaststroke semi-finals, Meilutytė placed first, with a time of 30.04 seconds and broke 50 metre breaststroke Championship record for the second time. At the 50 metre breaststroke final, she finished first and won gold medal with a time of 29.86 seconds, beating Viktorija Solnceva (31.34) and Sophie Taylor (31.38) and for the third time breaking Championship record.

In the 100 metre breaststroke heats, Meilutyte placed second with a time of 1:08.62 seconds. At the 100 metre breaststroke semi-finals, she placed third with a time of 1:08.49 seconds. During 50 metre breaststroke final, she won gold medal, by beating Sophie Taylor (1:07.36) and Viktorija Solnceva (1:07.53) with a time of 1:06.61 seconds and broke Championship record for the girl's 100 metre breaststroke (long-course).

In 50 metre backstroke heats, Meilutytė finished seventh with a time of 29.04 seconds, broke Lithuanian swimming record for the women's 50 metre backstroke (long-course). In the 50 metre backstroke semi-finals, she finished fourth, with a time of 28.78 seconds and broke Lithuanian record for the second time. During 50 metre backstroke final, Meilutytė placed fifth with a time of 29.03 seconds.

In 50 metre freestyle heats, she finished second with a time of 25.36 seconds, while in 50 metre freestyle semi-finals, Meilutyte broke Lithuanian record and finished second with a time of 25.19 seconds. During the 50 metre freestyle final, Meilutyte won gold medal by beating Rozaliya Nasretdinova (25.16) and Siobhan Bernadette Haughey (25.38) and for the second time breaking Lithuanian swimming record for the women's 50 metre freestyle (long-course).

Meilutytė also broke Lithuanian record in 50 metre butterfly heats, where she placed fifth with a time of 27.29 seconds. During 50 metre butterfly semi-finals, she finished seventh with a time of 27.14 seconds and broke Lithuanian swimming record for the second time. Meilutytė withdrew from the 50 metre butterfly final because of the great physical load.

In the 100 metre freestyle heats, Meilutyte finished fourth with a time of 55.65 seconds. In the 100 metre freestyle semi-finals, she placed second with a time of 55.16 seconds, broke Lithuanian swimming record for the women's 100 metre freestyle (long-course). During 100 metre freestyle final, Meilutytė won silver medal, finishing behind Siobhan Bernadette Haughey (54.47) with a time of 54.94 seconds.

In 200 metre individual medley heats, Meilutytė finished first with a time of 2:15.10 seconds. During the 200 metre individual medley final, she won gold medal, by beating Emu Higuchi (2:15.15) and Ella Eastin (2:15.34) and broke Championship and Lithuanian swimming record.

Meilutyte also competed in 4×100 metre mixed medley with Danas Rapšys, Povilas Strazdas, Eva Gliožerytė. During 4×100 metre mixed medley heats, they finished third with a time of 3:55.74 seconds and qualified to the final. At the 4×100 metre mixed medley final, Meilutyte, Rapšys, Strazdas and Gliožerytė finished second and won silver medal with a time of 3:52.52 seconds.

During this Championship, Meilutytė broke various Championship records five times, Lithuanian records nine times and won six medals – gold medals for 50 metre freestyle, 50 metre breaststroke, 100 metre breaststroke and 200 metre individual medley, while for 100 metre freestyle and 4×100 metre mixed medley she won silver medals.

==== 2013 Swimming World Cup ====
Meilutytė participated in one meet of 2013 FINA Swimming World Cup in Moscow, Russia. On the overall women's scoring of the 2013 FINA Swimming World Cup, she placed fourteenth with total of 80 points. At the meet in Moscow, Meilutytė competed in four events: 50 metre breaststroke, 100 metre breaststroke, 50 metre freestyle and 100 metre individual medley.

In 50 metre breaststroke heats, Meilutytė placed second with a time of 29.96 seconds. In 50 metre breaststroke final, she won gold medal, by beating Alia Atkinson (29.33) and Dorothea Brandt (30.35) with a time of 28.89 seconds and broke European swimming record for women's 50 metre breaststroke (short course) which was previously held by herself. In 100 metre breaststroke heats, Meilutytė placed third with a time of 1:06.03 seconds. In 100 metre breaststroke final, she won gold medal, by beating Yuliya Yefimova (1:03.53) and Alia Atkinson (1:04.64) with a time of 1:02.36 and set a new world swimming record for women's 100 metre breaststroke (short course).

Meilutytė also competed in 50 metre freestyle heats, where she placed tenth with a time of 25.18 seconds and did not qualify to the final. In 100 metre individual medley heats, she placed fifth with a time of 1:0.97 seconds. In 100 metre individual medley final, Meilutytė won her third gold medal at 2013 FINA Swimming World Cup, by beating Katinka Hosszú (58.75) and Alia Atkinson (59.12) with a time of 58.57 seconds. She also broke Lithuanian swimming record for women's 100 metre individual medley (short course).

==== 2013 European Short Course Swimming Championships ====
At the 2013 European Short Course Swimming Championships in Herning, Denmark, Meilutytė competed three events: 50 metre breaststroke, 100 metre breaststroke and 100 metre individual medley. She won gold medals and broke Championship records for all three events.

=== 2014 ===
==== 2014 Summer Youth Olympics ====
At the 2014 Summer Youth Olympics in Nanjing, China, Meilutytė has competed in three events: 50 metre breaststroke, 100 metre breaststroke and 100 metre freestyle.

In her first event, 50 metre breaststroke heats, Meilutytė placed third, with a time of 32.11 seconds. In the 50 metre breaststroke semi-finals, Meilutytė placed first, with a time of 31.67 seconds. During the 50 metre breaststroke final, she won the gold medal, by beating Julia Willers (31.78) and Anna Sztankovics (31.84) with a time of 30.14 seconds. At the 100 metre breaststroke heats, Meilutytė placed second, with a time of 1:08.97 seconds. At the 100 metre breaststroke semi-finals she placed first, with a time of 1:07.83. On the next day of the 2014 Summer Youth Olympics, Meilutytė competed in 100 metre breaststroke final, where she won the gold medal with a time of 1:05.39.

Meilutytė also competed in the 100 metre freestyle. During the 100 metre freestyle heats, Meilutytė placed fourth, with a time of 56.20 seconds. On the same day in the 100 metre freestyle semi-finals, where she placed fourth, with a time of 55.46 seconds. During the 100 metre freestyle final, Meilutytė placed fifth and set a new personal record of 55.17 seconds. She also was scheduled to compete in the 200 metre individual medley, but did not start due to the pain in her shoulder.

==== 2014 European Aquatics Championships ====
At the 2014 European Aquatics Championships in Berlin, Germany, Meilutytė has competed in two events: 50 metre breaststroke and 50 metre freestyle. On 23 August 2014, Meilutytė competed in her first event – the 50 metre breaststroke heats, where she placed first with a time of 30.73. On the same day in the 50 metre breaststroke semi-finals Meilutytė broke the Championship record in 50 metre breaststroke, previously held by Yuliya Efimova (30.29 seconds), finishing with a time of 29.88 seconds. On 24 August 2014, Meilutytė competed in the 50 metre breaststroke final, where she won the gold medal with a time of 29.89 seconds, thus making it the last gold medal she needed to reach first ever Aquatic Grand Slam, which requires to win gold medal in swimming events at Olympic Games, Youth Olympic Games, FINA World Senior (long-course and short-course) and Junior Championships, Swimming World Cup, European Youth and Senior Championships (long-course and short-course). Meilutytė is the first Lithuanian swimmer ever to win gold medal in a long-course European Aquatics Championships.

At the 50 metre freestyle, she progressed to the semi-final by placing 17th with the time of 25.54 seconds. Meilutytė decided to withdraw from the 50 metre freestyle semi-finals because she wanted to save energy for the 50 metre breaststroke final.

==== 2014 Swimming World Cup ====
Meilutytė participated in two meets of the 2014 FINA Swimming World Cup – in Singapore and Tokyo, Japan. On the overall women's scoring of the 2014 FINA Swimming World Cup, she placed thirteenth with total of 45 points.

At the meet in Tokyo, Japan, Meilutytė competed in four events: 50 metre breaststroke, 100 metre breaststroke, 50 metre freestyle, and 100 metre individual medley. In 50 metre breaststroke heats, she placed first with a time of 29.90 seconds. During the 50 metre breaststroke final, Meilutytė won gold medal, by beating Alia Atkinson (29.66) and Lillia King (30.13) with a time of 29.36 seconds. Meilutytė also competed in 100 metre breaststroke event, where she won silver medal with a time of 1:03.72 seconds.

In 100 metre individual medley heats, Meilutytė placed sixth, with a time of 1:00.33 seconds. In the 100 metre individual medley final, she placed fourth, with a time of 59.23 seconds. In 50 metre freestyle heats, Meilutytė placed twelfth, with a time of 25.15 seconds and did not qualify to the final. Meilutytė was also scheduled to compete in 100 metre freestyle, but decided to withdraw because she wanted to prepare for the 50 metre breaststroke event.

At the 2014 FINA Swimming World Cup meet in Singapore, Meilutytė competed in three events: 100 metre breaststroke, 50 metre freestyle and 100 metre individual medley. In 50 metre breaststroke heats, she placed second with a time of 30.09 seconds. In the 50 metre breaststroke final, she won a silver medal with a time of 29.26 seconds. Meilutytė also competed in the 100 metre breaststroke event. In 100 metre breaststroke heats, she finished first, beating Alia Atkinson (1:05.16) and Katie Meili (1:07.07) with a time of 1:04.89. In the 100 metre breaststroke final, Meilutytė won a silver medal with a time of 1:03.05 seconds.

In 50 metre freestyle heats, Meilutytė placed tenth with a time of 25.60 seconds and did not qualify to the final. In 100 metre individual medley heats, Meilutytė placed fourth with a time of 1:00.32 seconds. In the final, she won a bronze medal with a time of 59.00 seconds.

==== 2014 World Swimming Championships ====
At the 2014 FINA World Swimming Championships (25 m) in Doha, Qatar, Meilutytė competed in four events: 50 metre breaststroke, 100 metre breaststroke, 100 metre freestyle and 100 metre individual medley.

=== 2015 ===
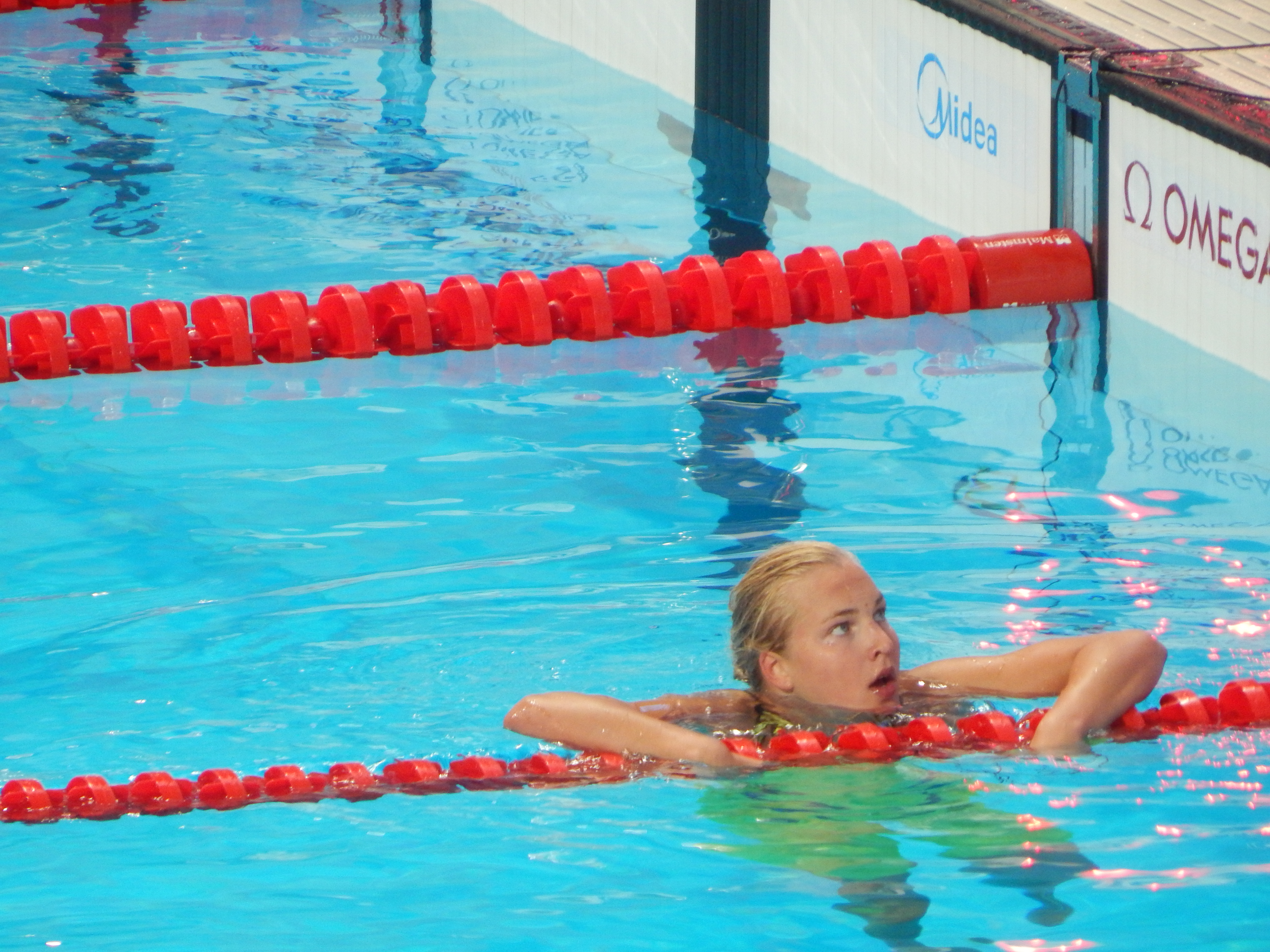
100m breast semi-final in Kazan 2015

==== 2015 World Aquatics championships ====
At the 2015 World Aquatics Championships in Kazan, Russia, Meilutytė competed in two events: 50 metre breaststroke and 100 metre breaststroke.

==== Short hiatus ====
In September 2015 Meilutytė suffered an injury to her elbow while riding a bike from her home at Plymouth to her training camp. She had to undergo a small surgery, which was done by surgeon Andre Murphy. Because of this, Meilutytė had to take a break from her everyday swimming for a few weeks and then undergo rehabilitation. Because of the accident, she did not participate at the 2015 European Short Course Swimming Championships in Netanya, Israel.

=== 2016 ===
==== 2016 Summer Olympics ====
At the 2016 Summer Olympics in Rio de Janeiro, Meilutytė finished seventh in the 100 metre breaststroke.

=== 2017 ===
==== 2017 World Aquatics championships ====
At the 2017 World Aquatics Championships in Budapest, Hungary, Meilutytė has competed in three events: 100 metre breaststroke, 50 metre breaststroke and 50 metre freestyle.

On 24 July 2017, Meilutytė competed in her first event – the 100 metre breaststroke heats, where she placed third with a time of 1:05.81. On the same day, during semi-finals Meilutytė also placed third, put up a 1:05.06, marking her fastest performance in this event since she 2013. Meilutytė finished fourth in the 100 metre breaststroke final with a 1:05.65. She was well off her previous World Record time of 1:04.35, which was broken by Lilly King, who swam a 1:04.13.

Meilutytė also competed in the 50 metre freestyle heats, where she finished with a time of 26.03 and failed to progress to the semi-final.

In 50 metre breaststroke heats, Meilutytė placed sixth, with a time of 30.58, to secure her spot for the semi-finals. On the evening session, she placed fourth with a time of 30.40 seconds. Meilutytė managed to finish in fourth place on the final round by twenty-one hundredths of a second (0.21) behind American Katie Meili, clocking at 30.20. Russian Yuliya Yefimova placed second and Meili's teammate Lilly King broke another World Record with a time of 29.40.

=== 2018 ===
==== 2018 European Aquatics Championships ====
At the 2018 European Aquatics Championships in Glasgow, United Kingdom, Meilutytė competed in the 50 metre freestyle, 100 metre breaststroke, Mixed 4 × 100 metre medley relay and 50 metre breaststroke. On 3 August 2018, Meilutytė competed in her first event – the 50 metre freestyle heats, where she placed tenth with a time of 25.20. On the same day in the 50 metre freestyle semi-finals Meilutytė broke her own national record (25.10 seconds), finishing with a time of 25.04 seconds. During the 50 metre freestyle final, Meilutytė placed eighth with a time of 25.16. At the 100 metre breaststroke heats, Meilutytė placed first, with a time of 1:06.89 seconds. At the 100 metre breaststroke semi-finals she placed fifth, with a time of 1:07.16. On the next day of the 2018 European Aquatics Championships, Meilutytė competed in 100 metre breaststroke final, where she won the silver medal with a time of 1:06.26.

=== 2019–2021: Suspension and return ===
==== Suspension due to anti-doping rule violations ====
In early May 2019, Meilutytė was facing at least a one-year suspension for not being present for doping tests in April 2018, August 2018, and March 2019. On 21 May 2019, Meilutytė announced her retirement from sports. Five days later, Swimming World officially called her career as permanently over, with no prospects of ever returning to competition, and dubbed her actions the "Fall of an Olympic Champion". Four days earlier, NBC Sports propagated the same sentiment, including that she was a "shock Olympic swimming champion". On 21 July 2019, Meilutytė was officially suspended from swimming competition by FINA from 21 July 2019 to 20 July 2021 due to her three anti-doping rule violations of not being present for testing.

==== Return to competition ====
Returning to competition following the two year suspension, Meilutytė competed at the 2021 Lithuanian Short Course Championships in Klaipėda in December in the 100 metre breaststroke, where she won the gold medal with a time of 1:05.23, the 50 metre butterfly, where she won the silver medal with a 26.69, and the 50 metre breaststroke, in which she won the gold medal in 29.33 seconds.

=== 2022: World and European champion in 50 metre breaststroke ===
==== 2022 World Aquatics Championships ====
In 2022, Meilutytė returned to training, attending a training camp with the Lithuania National Team from January to February. At the long course 2022 Winter Lithuanian Championships, she won the gold medal in the 50 metre breaststroke with a 30.24 and the gold medal in the 50 metre freestyle in a time of 25.19 seconds. Two months later, she achieved a 2022 World Aquatics Championships qualifying time in the 100 metre breaststroke, finishing in 1:07.07 in a silver medal-winning performance at the 2022 Lithuanian Swimming Championships. At the 2022 World Aquatics Championships she won the bronze medal in the women's 100 metre breaststroke, finishing behind Anna Elendt (1:05.98) and Benedetta Pilato (1:05.93) with a time of 1:06.02. On 25 July, ten years after winning Olympic gold and nine years after her last world championship win, Meilutytė won a second world title, taking out the 50m breaststroke in Budapest.

==== 2022 European Aquatics Championships ====
For her first event at the 2022 European Aquatics Championships, held in August in Rome, Italy, Meilutytė won the bronze medal in the 100 metre breaststroke with a time of 1:06.50, which was 0.53 seconds slower than gold medalist Benedetta Pilato and 0.16 seconds behind silver medalist Lisa Angiolini of Italy. In her second event, the 50 metre freestyle, she placed thirty-first in the preliminary heats with a time of 26.38 seconds and did not advance to the semifinals stage of competition. On 17 August, the seventh day of competition, she won the European title and gold medal in the 50 metre breaststroke, finishing over one-tenth of a second ahead of the next-fastest swimmer with a time of 29.59 seconds.

==== 2022 Swimming World Cup ====
On 23 October, at the 2022 FINA Swimming World Cup stop in Berlin, Germany, Meilutytė won the gold medal and set a new European record and Lithuanian record in the short course 50 metre breaststroke with a time of 28.60 seconds, which was just four-hundredths of a second slower than the world record of 28.56 seconds by Alia Atkinson in 2018. In addition to her gold medal in the 50 metre breaststroke, she won the gold medal in the 100 metre breaststroke with a time of 1:03.07 and placed fifth in the 100 metre individual medley with a time of 59.08 seconds over the full three days in Berlin.

The following stop of the circuit, in Toronto, Canada beginning 28 October, Meilutytė started off with a seventh-place finish in the final of the 100 metre individual medley on day one with a time of 59.67 seconds. On the second day, she won the gold medal in the 100 metre breaststroke with a time of 1:02.95, which made her the only female to swim faster than 1:03.00 in the final. In the morning preliminaries she had finished in a time of 1:04.74 to qualify for the final ranking fourth, just 0.04 seconds behind third-ranked Lydia Jacoby of the United States and 0.20 seconds behind first-ranked Anna Elendt. The next day, she was the only female to swim faster than 29.00 seconds in the 50 metre breaststroke, winning the gold medal with a time of 28.96 seconds, which was 1.29 seconds faster than bronze medalist Anastasia Gorbenko of Israel.

In the 100 metre individual medley on day one of the stop in the third and final location, Indianapolis, United States, Meilutytė placed seventh with a time of 59.58 seconds. She followed up with a gold medal-win in the 100 metre breaststroke on day two, finishing 0.97 seconds ahead of the second-place finisher with a US Open record time of 1:02.77. She made it another gold medal in a US Open record time the following day, winning the 50 metre breaststroke with a time of 28.70 seconds. Across all three stops of the World Cup, she earned 151.9 points for her performances, ranking as the fifth overall highest-scoring female competitor.

==== 2022 World Short Course Championships ====
At the 2022 World Short Course Championships, held in Melbourne, Australia, Meilutytė ranked first in the preliminaries of the 100 metre breaststroke on day two with a time of 1:03.81 and qualified for the evening semifinals. She finished in 1:03.40 in the semifinals to qualify for the final ranking second. During racing in the final the following day, she was disqualified. Beginning again, this time in the preliminaries of the 50 metre breaststroke on day five, she qualified for the semifinals ranked first with a time of 29.10 seconds. In the semifinals, she set the first world record of the Championships in a stage other than an event final, achieving a new world record time of 28.37 seconds. She won the gold medal in the final with a time of 28.50 seconds, which made her the world title holder in the female 50 metre breaststroke for both the long course and short course World Championships in 2022.

== Personal bests ==
As of 2 August 2025

Event	Time	Meet	Location	Date	Note(s)
50m breaststroke (long course)	29.16	2023 World Aquatics Championships	Fukuoka, Japan	30 July 2023	WR
100m breaststroke (long course)	1:04.35	2013 World Aquatics Championships	Barcelona, Spain	29 July 2013	NR/ER
200m breaststroke (long course)	2:25.62	Energy for Swim	Rome, Italy	9 August 2017	NR
50m breaststroke (short course)	28.37	2022 World Short Course Championships	Melbourne, Australia	17 December 2022	WR
100m breaststroke (short course)	1:02.36	2013 FINA Swimming World Cup Moscow	Moscow, Russia	12 October 2013	NR/WR
200m breaststroke (short course)	2:22.21	2017 FINA Swimming World Cup Moscow	Moscow, Russia	3 August 2017	NR
50m butterfly (long course)	27.14	2013 World Junior Championships	Dubai, UAE	28 August 2013	NR
50m butterfly (short course)	26.62	2013 Lithuanian Championships	Anykščiai, Lithuania	20 December 2013	NR
50m backstroke (long course)	28.78	2013 World Junior Championships	Dubai, UAE	29 August 2013	
100m backstroke (long course)	1.04.19	2012 British GAS Swimming Competition	Plymouth, United Kingdom	7 May 2012	
50m backstroke (short course)	28.36	2013 ASA South West Regional Championships	Millfield, United Kingdom	7 December 2013	
50m freestyle (long course)	25.04	2018 European Aquatics Championships	Glasgow, United Kingdom	3 August 2018	NR
100m freestyle (long course)	54.94	2013 World Junior Championships	Dubai, UAE	28 August 2013	NR
200m freestyle (long course)	2:00.11	2014 British Championships	Glasgow, United Kingdom	10 April 2014	NR
50m freestyle (short course)	24.95	2013 Lithuanian Championships	Anykščiai, Lithuania	20 December 2013	NR
100m freestyle (short course)	53.54	2012 World Championships	Istanbul, Turkey	13 December 2012	NR
200m individual medley (long course)	2:12.32	2013 World Junior Championships	Dubai, UAE	29 August 2013	NR
100m individual medley (short course)	57.68	European Championships	Herning, Denmark	14 December 2013	NR
200m individual medley (short course)	2:09.55	2012 Lithuanian Championships	Anykščiai, Lithuania	22 December 2012	NR

== Records ==
Legend: records marked bold are still held by Rūta Meilutytė.

=== European records ===
Type	Distance	Event	Time	Meet	Location	Date	Age	Ref
ER	100m (long course)	Breaststroke	1:05.21	2012 Summer Olympics	London, United Kingdom	29 July 2012	15	
ER	50m (short course)	Breaststroke	29.44	2012 World Championships	Istanbul, Turkey	13 Dec 2012	15	
ER	100m (short course)	Breaststroke	1:03.52	2012 World Championships	Istanbul, Turkey	15 Dec 2012	15	
ER	100m (long course)	Breaststroke	1:05.20	2013 International Swimming Meeting of Monte-Carlo	Monte Carlo, Monaco	8 June 2013	16	
ER	50m (long course)	Breaststroke	29.96	2013 International Swimming Meeting of Barcelona	Barcelona, Spain	11 June 2013	16	
ER	100m (long course)	Breaststroke	1:04.35	2013 World Aquatics Championships	Barcelona, Spain	29 July 2013	16	
ER	100m (short course)	Breaststroke	1:02.36	2013 FINA Swimming World Cup Moscow	Moscow, Russia	12 October 2013	16	
ER	50m (short course)	Breaststroke	28.89	2013 FINA Swimming World Cup Moscow	Moscow, Russia	13 October 2013	16	
ER	50m (short course)	Breaststroke	28.81	2014 FINA World Swimming Championships	Doha, Qatar	3 December 2014	17	
ER	50m (short course)	Breaststroke	28.60	2022 FINA Swimming World Cup Berlin	Berlin, Germany	23 October 2022	25	
ER	50m (short course)	Breaststroke	28.37	2022 FINA World Short Course Championships	Melbourne, Australia	17 December 2022	25	

=== World records ===
Type	Distance	Event	Time	Meet	Location	Date	Age	Ref
WR	100m (long course)	Breaststroke	1:04.35	2013 World Aquatics Championships	Barcelona, Spain	29 July 2013	16	
WR	50m (long course)	Breaststroke	29.48	2013 World Aquatics Championships	Barcelona, Spain	3 August 2013	16	
WR	100m (short course)	Breaststroke	1:02.36	2013 FINA Swimming World Cup Moscow	Moscow, Russia	12 October 2013	16	
WR	50m (short course)	Breaststroke	28.37	2022 World Short Course Championships	Melbourne, Australia	17 December 2022	25	

== International championships (50 m) ==
Meet	50 freestyle	100 freestyle	50 backstroke	50 breaststroke	100 breaststroke	50 butterfly	200 medley	4×100 mixed medley
Junior level
EJC 2013	2nd place, silver medalist(s)				1st place, gold medalist(s)			
WJC 2013	1st place, gold medalist(s)	2nd place, silver medalist(s)	5th	1st place, gold medalist(s)	1st place, gold medalist(s)	7th (sf,WD)	1st place, gold medalist(s)	2nd place, silver medalist(s)
YOG 2014		5th		1st place, gold medalist(s)	1st place, gold medalist(s)		DNS	
Senior level
OG 2012	26th	23rd	—N/a	—N/a	1st place, gold medalist(s)	—N/a		—N/a
WC 2013		27th		2nd place, silver medalist(s)	1st place, gold medalist(s)			—N/a
EC 2014	17th (h,WD)			1st place, gold medalist(s)				
WC 2015				4th	2nd place, silver medalist(s)			
EC 2016					1st place, gold medalist(s)			
OG 2016			—N/a	—N/a	7th	—N/a		—N/a
WC 2017	37th			4th	4th			
EC 2018	8th			4th	2nd place, silver medalist(s)			
WC 2022	34th			1st place, gold medalist(s)	3rd place, bronze medalist(s)			
EC 2022	31st			1st place, gold medalist(s)	3rd place, bronze medalist(s)			
WC 2023				1st place, gold medalist(s)	1st place, gold medalist(s)			
WC 2024				1st place, gold medalist(s)	17th			15th

== International championships (25 m) ==
Meet	50 freestyle	100 freestyle	50 breaststroke	100 breaststroke	200 breaststroke	100 medley
WC 2012	DNS	5th (h,WD)	1st place, gold medalist(s)	1st place, gold medalist(s)		2nd place, silver medalist(s)
EC 2013	DNS		1st place, gold medalist(s)	1st place, gold medalist(s)		1st place, gold medalist(s)
WC 2014	DNS		1st place, gold medalist(s)	2nd place, silver medalist(s)		5th
EC 2017			1st place, gold medalist(s)	1st place, gold medalist(s)	DNS	
WC 2018	32nd		2nd place, silver medalist(s)	14th		12th
WC 2022			1st place, gold medalist(s)	DSQ		

== Personal life ==
In June 2025, Rūta Meilutytė publicly came out as bisexual in a message of solidarity with the LGBTQ+ community. In a post shared on social media and during a Pride Month initiative in Lithuania, Meilutytė stated, “I am one of them,” expressing personal identification with the community. Her message was widely seen as both a personal revelation and a strong gesture of support for LGBTQ+ visibility in sports and Lithuanian society more broadly. Meilutytė’s announcement received widespread attention, especially given her status as one of Lithuania’s most prominent athletes.

== Decorations ==

Grand Cross of Order for Merits to Lithuania (10 August 2012)

== See also ==
- List of Olympic medalists in swimming (women)
- List of Youth Olympic Games gold medalists who won Olympic gold medals
- List of World Aquatics Championships medalists in swimming (women)
- List of World Swimming Championships (25 m) medalists (women)
- List of Lithuanian records in swimming
- List of Baltic records in swimming
- List of European records in swimming
- List of world records in swimming
- World record progression 50 metres breaststroke
- World record progression 100 metres breaststroke

Records
Preceded by Yuliya Yefimova	Women's 50 m breaststroke world record holder (long course); 3 August 2013 – 30 July 2017	Succeeded by Lilly King
Preceded by Jessica Hardy	Women's 100 m breaststroke world record holder (long course); 29 July 2013 – 25 July 2017	Succeeded by Lilly King
Preceded by Alia Atkinson	Women's 50-metre breaststroke world record holder (short course); 17 December 2022 – present	Succeeded by Incumbent
Preceded by Rebecca Soni	Women's 100-metre breaststroke world record holder (short course); 12 October 2013 – present Alia Atkinson (tied 3 December 2014)	Succeeded by Incumbent
Preceded by Yuliya Yefimova; Yuliya Yefimova	Women's 50 m breaststroke European record holder (long course); 11 June 2013 – 3 August 2013; 3 August 2013 – present	Succeeded by Yuliya Yefimova; Incumbent
Preceded by Yuliya Yefimova	Women's 100 m breaststroke European record holder (long course); 29 July 2012 – 8 June 2013; 8 June 2013 – present	Succeeded by Incumbent
Preceded by Janne Schäfer	Women's 50 m breaststroke European record holder (short course); 12 December 2012 – present	Succeeded by Incumbent
Preceded by Rikke Møller-Pedersen	Women's 100 m breaststroke European record holder (short course); 15 December 2012 – present	Succeeded by Incumbent
Awards
Preceded by Tobiasz Lis	Best European Young Athlete of the Year; 2012, 2013	Succeeded by Simone Sabbioni
Preceded by Laura Asadauskaitė	Lithuanian Sportsman of the Year; 2012, 2013	Succeeded by Repealed
Preceded by Laura Asadauskaitė	Lithuanian Sportswoman of the Year; 2014, 2018, 2022	Succeeded by Incumbent
