= Imogen Clark (swimmer) =

British swimmer (born 1999)

Personal information
- Full name: Imogen Louise Clark
- Nationality: British
- Born: 1 June 1999 (age 27) Chesterfield, Derbyshire, England
- Height: 5 ft 8 in (173 cm)
- Weight: 60 kg (132 lb)

Sport
- Sport: Swimming
- Strokes: Breaststroke
- Club: Derby Excel
Medal record
Representing Great Britain
European Championships (LC)
Silver medal – second place	2018 Glasgow	50 m breaststroke
Bronze medal – third place	2022 Rome	50 m breaststroke
Representing England
Commonwealth Games
Silver medal – second place	2022 Birmingham	50 m breaststroke

Imogen Louise Clark (born 1 June 1999) is a British swimmer.

She competed in the 50 m breaststroke event at the 2018 European Aquatics Championships, winning the silver medal.

== International Swimming League ==
In the Autumn of 2019 she was member of the inaugural International Swimming League swimming for Energy Standard, who won the team title in Las Vegas, Nevada, in December.

== Personal ==
Clark is from Morton in Derbyshire. She is epileptic.
