= Kristýna Horská =

Czech swimmer (born 1997)

Personal information
- Nationality: Czech Republic
- Born: 30 September 1997 (age 28)

Sport
- Sport: Swimming
Medal record
Women's swimming
Representing Czech Republic
European Championships (LC)
| Gold medal – first place | 2024 Belgrade | 200 m breaststroke |
European Championships (SC)
| Bronze medal – third place | 2023 Otopeni | 200 m breaststroke |

Kristýna Horská (born 30 September 1997) is a Czech former swimmer. She competed in the 2020 Summer Olympics.
