= Klara Thormalm =

Swedish swimmer (born 1998)

Personal information
- Nationality: Swedish
- Born: 29 March 1998 (age 28)

Sport
- Sport: Swimming
Medal record
Women's swimming
Representing Sweden
Event	1st	2nd	3rd
World Championships (SC)	0	0	1
Total	0	0	1
World Championships (SC)
Bronze medal – third place	2022 Melbourne	4×50 m medley

Klara Thormalm (born 29 March 1998) is a Swedish swimmer. She competed in the women's 100 metre breaststroke event at the 2020 European Aquatics Championships, in Budapest, Hungary.
