= Veera Kivirinta =

Finnish swimmer (born 1995)

Personal information
- Born: 6 April 1995 (age 31)

Sport
- Sport: Swimming
Medal record
Women's swimming
Representing Finland
European Championships (LC)
Silver medal – second place	2024 Belgrade	50 m breaststroke

Veera Kivirinta (born 6 April 1995) is a Finnish swimmer. She competed in the women's 50 metre breaststroke event at the 2017 World Aquatics Championships.
