= Lisa Mamié =

Swiss swimmer (born 1998)

Personal information
- Nationality: Swiss
- Born: 27 October 1998 (age 27)

Sport
- Sport: Swimming
Medal record
Women's swimming
Representing Switzerland
Event / 1st / 2nd / 3rd; European Championships / 1 / 2 / 1
European Championships (LC)
Gold medal – first place	2022 Rome	200 m breaststroke
Silver medal – second place	2020 Budapest	200 m breaststroke
Silver medal – second place	2024 Belgrade	100 m breaststroke
Bronze medal – third place	2024 Belgrade	200 m breaststroke

Lisa Mamié (born 27 October 1998) is a retired Swiss swimmer. She competed in the women's 100 metre breaststroke at the 2019 World Aquatics Championships. In 2014, she represented Switzerland at the 2014 Summer Youth Olympics held in Nanjing, China.
