= Andrea Podmaníková =

Slovak swimmer (born 1998)

Personal information
- Nationality: Slovak
- Born: 23 February 1998 (age 28) Topoľčany, Slovakia
- Height: 71 in (180 cm)

Sport
- Sport: Swimming
- Strokes: breaststroke
- Club: Priana SportClub (Topoľčany, Slovakia)
- College team: Southern Methodist University; North Carolina State University
- Coach: Steve Collins (SMU); Braden Holloway (NC State)

Andrea Podmaníková (born 23 February 1998) is a Slovak swimmer who competed for Southern Methodist and North Carolina State universities and represented her native Slovakia at the 2020 Tokyo Olympics in the 100 and 200 breaststroke events. After the Olympics, she won two bronze medals in international competitions in May 2022, first in the 50 breaststroke at the FINA Swimming World Cup in the U.S. and later in the 100 butterfly at the Grand Prix Slovakia.

Podmanikova was born 23 February 1998 in Topoľčany, Nitra, Slovakia to Daniela Podmanikova, and had two brothers, Tomas and Lukas. She trained and competed for Coach Vladimir Zeleznik at Priana SportClub Topolcany. She was a member of the Slovak National Team, and in 2016 was recognized as the Slovak Swimming Federation's best female swimmer.

Prior to college, she competed for Slovakia in the women's 100 metre breaststroke event on 27 July at the 2017 World Aquatics Championships, placing 30th and recording a time of 1:10.13.

== Collegiate swimming ==
From 2018 to 2019, she attended Southern Methodist University and swam for Head Coach Steve Collins. On March 2, 2019, she set a school record in the 200 breaststroke of 2:08.66. She competed in both the 100 and 200 breaststroke at the 2018 and 2019 NCAA Championships and was all conference in the 100 and 200 breaststroke, the 200 free and medley relays, and the 400 medley relay. A solid student, she was a three-time American Athletic Conference Swimmer of the week, and on the Athletic Conference Academic All-Academic Team in 2019.

She transferred to North Carolina State University in her Sophomore year where she swam for former NC State All American swimmer Braden Holloway through 2023. At NC State, she was a three time All American in the 100 breaststroke between 2021 and 2023, and in 2021 in the 200 breaststroke as well.

== 2020 Tokyo Olympics ==
In late July, 2021, she represented Slovakia at the 2020 Summer Olympics held in Tokyo, Japan. She placed 28th in the Women's 100-meter breaststroke with a time of 1:08.36 placing first in the second heat, and finishing around 2.8 seconds from contending for a bronze medal. America took the gold, with South Africa taking the silver, and Lily King of the American team taking the bronze with a time of 1:05.54.

In the women's 200-meter breaststroke, she placed 30th with a time of 2:29.56, with South African swimmer Tatjana Shoenmaker taking the gold and Americans Lily King and Annie Lazor taking the silver and bronze medals.

=== International competition highlights ===
She held two bronze medals in international competition. She won a bronze medal in the 50 breaststroke at the FINA Swimming World Cup in the U.S. at the age of 24 in May 2022, with a time of 29.89. She won a bronze medal in the 100 butterfly with a time of 1:02.59 at the Grand Prix Slovakia in her native country in May 2022.

In 2024, she swam in the World Aquatics Championships in Hungary in the 4x100 and 4x50 Medley relays. She swam in the European swimming championships in the 100 and 200 breaststroke and 100 medley in Romania in 2023.
