= Swimming at the 2025 World Aquatics Championships – Women's 100 metre breaststroke =

Women's 100 metre breaststroke at the 2025 World Aquatics Championships
- Venue: World Aquatics Championships Arena
- Location: Singapore Sports Hub, Kallang
- Dates: 28 July (heats and semifinals); 29 July (final)
- Competitors: 56 from 50 nations
- Winning time: 1:05.19

Medalists
gold medal	Anna Elendt	Germany
silver medal	Kate Douglass	United States
bronze medal	Tang Qianting	China

The women's 100 metre breaststroke event at the 2025 World Aquatics Championships WAS held from 28 to 29 July 2025 at the World Aquatics Championships Arena at the Singapore Sports Hub in Kallang, Singapore.

== Background ==
China’s Tang Qianting is the favourite for the event, as she won the event at the 2024 World Championships and finished second at the 2024 Olympics. She won the 2025 Chinese Championships in 1:05.57, the second-fastest time this year, and holds the fastest time of 1:04.39 from the past two years. In April, Great Britain’s Angharad Evans swam 1:05.37, which is the fastest time this year. She is aiming for her first major long course medal. Germany’s Anna Elendt ranks third in 2025 with 1:05.72, her fastest since earning silver in 2022.

The USA’s Kate Douglass, Estonia’s Eneli Jefimova, and Italy’s Anita Bottazzo have all swum under 1:06 in 2025 and are close in rankings. Lithuania’s Rūta Meilutytė and the USA’s Lilly King, both former world champions, are in contention but must return to their past form to reach the podium. Other finalists could include Ireland’s Mona McSharry, Russia’s Evgeniia Chikunova, Japan’s Satomi Suzuki, Italy’s Lisa Angiolini, and Belarus’s Alina Zmushka.

== Qualification ==
Each National Federation was permitted to enter a maximum of two qualified athletes in each individual event, but they could do so only if both of them had attained the "A" standard qualification time. For this event, the "A" standard qualification time was 1:06.87 seconds. Federations could enter one athlete into the event if they met the "B" standard qualification time. For this event, the "B" standard qualification time was 1:09.21 seconds. Athletes could also enter the event if they had met an "A" or "B" standard in a different event and their Federation had not entered anyone else. Additional considerations applied to Federations who had few swimmers enter through the standard qualification times. Federations in this category could at least enter two men and two women to the competition, all of whom could enter into up to two events.

Top 10 fastest qualification times
Swimmer	Country	Time	Competition
Tang Qianting	China	1:04.39	2024 Chinese Championships
Tatjana Smith	South Africa	1:05.00	2024 Summer Olympics
Angharad Evans	Great Britain	1:05.37	2025 Great British Championships
Lilly King	United States	1:05.43	2024 United States Olympic Trials
Benedetta Pilato	Italy	1:05.44	Sette Colli 2024
Mona McSharry	Ireland	1:05.51	2024 Summer Olympics
Anna Elendt	Germany	1:05.72	2025 German Championships
Lydia Jacoby	United States	1:05.74	Texas stop of the 2024 TYR Pro Swim Series
Reona Aoki	Japan	1:05.76	2024 Japanese Olympic Trials
Kate Douglass	United States	1:05.79	2025 United States Championships

== Records ==
Prior to the competition, the existing world and championship records were as follows.

World record	Lilly King (USA)	1:04.13	Budapest, Hungary	25 July 2017
Competition record	Lilly King (USA)	1:04.13	Budapest, Hungary	25 July 2017

== Heats ==
The heats took place on 28 July 10:44.

Rank	Heat	Lane	Swimmer	Nation	Time	Notes
1	6	5	Mona McSharry	Ireland	1:05.99	Q
2	5	5	Anna Elendt	Germany	1:06.01	Q
3	5	6	Satomi Suzuki	Japan	1:06.13	Q
4	5	2	Evgeniia Chikunova	Neutral Athletes B	1:06.19	Q
5	6	1	Kotryna Teterevkova	Lithuania	1:06.21	Q
6	6	3	Kate Douglass	United States	1:06.32	Q
7	6	4	Tang Qianting	China	1:06.45	Q
8	5	7	Rūta Meilutytė	Lithuania	1:06.55	Q
9	6	2	Lisa Angiolini	Italy	1:06.59	Q
10	5	3	Anita Bottazzo	Italy	1:06.83	Q
10	6	7	Yang Chang	China	1:06.83	Q
12	5	0	Dominika Sztandera	Poland	1:06.85	Q
12	6	6	Eneli Jefimova	Estonia	1:06.85	Q
14	4	9	Florine Gaspard	Belgium	1:06.89	Q, NR
15	4	4	Lilly King	United States	1:06.93	Q
16	4	6	Alina Zmushka	Neutral Athletes A	1:06.96	Q
17	5	8	Macarena Ceballos	Argentina	1:06.99	
18	5	4	Angharad Evans	Great Britain	1:07.04	
19	4	1	Henrietta Fángli	Hungary	1:07.08	
20	4	5	Reona Aoki	Japan	1:07.19	
21	5	1	Ella Ramsay	Australia	1:07.23	
22	4	7	Sienna Toohey	Australia	1:07.24	
23	4	8	Letitia Sim	Singapore	1:07.25	
24	4	2	Anastasia Gorbenko	Israel	1:07.34	
25	6	8	Alexanne Lepage	Canada	1:07.35	
26	3	0	Lanihei Connolly	Cook Islands	1:07.40	NR
27	6	9	Rebecca Meder	South Africa	1:07.50	
28	4	3	Sophie Hansson	Sweden	1:07.67	
29	5	9	Silje Slyngstadli	Norway	1:08.31	
30	2	4	Veera Kivirinta	Finland	1:08.33	
31	4	0	Clara Rybak-Andersen	Denmark	1:08.39	
32	3	5	Ko Ha-ru	South Korea	1:08.46	
33	3	6	Teya Nikolova	Bulgaria	1:08.59	
34	3	4	Kristýna Horská	Czech Republic	1:08.79	
35	6	0	Lisa Mamié	Switzerland	1:08.84	
36	3	8	Melissa Rodríguez	Mexico	1:09.30	
37	3	7	Emily Santos	Panama	1:09.62	
38	3	9	Nikoletta Pavlopoulou	Greece	1:09.83	
39	3	3	Jimena Ruiz	Spain	1:09.84	
40	3	2	Andrea Podmaníková	Slovakia	1:10.35	
41	2	5	Mercedes Toledo	Venezuela	1:10.44	
42	2	3	Lynn El Hajj	Lebanon	1:10.85	
43	2	8	Candice Gao	Hong Kong	1:10.86	
44	2	9	Maria Erokhina	Cyprus	1:10.90	
45	2	2	Chen Pui Lam	Macau	1:11.51	
46	2	6	Nicole Frank	Uruguay	1:12.18	
47	1	6	Avigayle Tromp	Aruba	1:12.25	NR
48	2	0	Lea Osberg Højsted	Faroe Islands	1:13.19	
49	2	7	Nàdia Tudó	Andorra	1:13.28	
50	2	1	Adelaida Pchelintseva	Kazakhstan	1:13.46	
51	1	4	Jayla Pina	Cape Verde	1:14.00	
52	1	3	Stella Gjoka	Albania	1:15.07	
53	1	5	Marina Abu Shamaleh	Palestine	1:15.60	
54	1	1	Maria Batallones	Northern Mariana Islands	1:17.38	NR
55	1	7	Duana Lama	Nepal	1:17.71	
56	1	2	Sairy Escalante	Honduras	1:19.67	
	3	1	Phee Jinq En	Malaysia	Did not start	

== Semifinals ==
The semifinals took place on 28 July at 19:29.

Rank	Heat	Lane	Swimmer	Nation	Time	Notes
1	1	3	Kate Douglass	United States	1:05.49	Q
2	1	2	Anita Bottazzo	Italy	1:05.61	Q
3	2	6	Tang Qianting	China	1:05.87	Q
4	1	5	Evgeniia Chikunova	Neutral Athletes B	1:05.97	Q
5	1	8	Alina Zmushka	Neutral Athletes A	1:06.09	Q
6	2	5	Satomi Suzuki	Japan	1:06.12	Q
7	1	4	Anna Elendt	Germany	1:06.13	Q
8	2	3	Kotryna Teterevkova	Lithuania	1:06.17	Q
9	2	8	Lilly King	United States	1:06.26	
10	2	1	Eneli Jefimova	Estonia	1:06.28	
11	2	4	Mona McSharry	Ireland	1:06.33	
12	2	2	Lisa Angiolini	Italy	1:06.40	
13	1	6	Rūta Meilutytė	Lithuania	1:06.57	
14	2	7	Yang Chang	China	1:06.84	
15	1	7	Dominika Sztandera	Poland	1:07.34	
16	1	1	Florine Gaspard	Belgium	1:07.46	

== Final ==
The final took place on 29 July at 20:44.

Rank	Lane	Name	Nationality	Time	Notes
1st place, gold medalist(s)	1	Anna Elendt	Germany	1:05.19	NR
2nd place, silver medalist(s)	4	Kate Douglass	United States	1:05.27	
3rd place, bronze medalist(s)	3	Tang Qianting	China	1:05.64	
4	7	Satomi Suzuki	Japan	1:05.78	
5	6	Evgeniia Chikunova	Neutral Athletes B	1:06.04	
6	5	Anita Bottazzo	Italy	1:06.06	
7	2	Alina Zmushka	Neutral Athletes A	1:06.38	
8	8	Kotryna Teterevkova	Lithuania	1:06.61	
