= Swimming at the 2026 European Aquatics Championships – Women's 100 metre breaststroke =

Women's 100 metre breaststroke at the 2026 European Aquatics Championships
- Venue: Paris Aquatic Centre
- Dates: 11 August (heats and semifinals); 12 August (final)
- Competitors: 45 from 27 nations
- Winning time: 1:04.87 CR

Medalists
gold medal	Angharad Evans	Great Britain
silver medal	Mona McSharry	Ireland
bronze medal	Benedetta Pilato	Italy

The Women's 100 metre breaststroke competition of the 2026 European Aquatics Championships was held on 11 and 12 August 2026.

== Records ==
Prior to the competition, the existing world, European and championship records were as follows.

	Name	Nation	Time	Location	Date
World record	Lilly King	United States	1:04.13	Budapest	25 July 2017
European record	Rūta Meilutytė	Lithuania	1:04.35	Barcelona	29 July 2013
Championship record	Yuliya Efimova	Russia	1:05.53	Glasgow	5 August 2018

The following records were achieved during the competition.

Date	Event	Name	Nation	Time	Record
11 August	Heat 5	Angharad Evans	Great Britain	1:05.45	CR
11 August	Semifinal 2	Angharad Evans	Great Britain	1:04.97	CR
12 August	Final	Angharad Evans	Great Britain	1:04.87	CR
12 August	Final	Angharad Evans	Great Britain	1:04.87	NR

== Results ==
=== Heats ===
The heats were started on 11 August at 10:12.
Qualification Rules: The 16 fastest from the heats qualify to semifinals.

Rank	Heat	Lane	Swimmer	Nation	Time	Notes
1	5	4	Angharad Evans	Great Britain	1:05.45	Q, CR
2	5	3	Mona McSharry	Ireland	1:05.97	Q
3	5	5	Benedetta Pilato	Italy	1:06.20	Q
4	4	3	Lisa Angiolini	Italy	1:06.31	Q
5	5	6	Tes Schouten	Netherlands	1:06.48	Q
6	4	4	Anna Elendt	Germany	1:06.74	Q
7	4	5	Eneli Jefimova	Estonia	1:06.85	Q
8	3	5	Evgeniia Chikunova	Neutral Athletes B	1:06.89	Q
9	4	6	Dominika Sztandera	Poland	1:06.97	Q
10	3	3	Alina Zmushka	Neutral Athletes A	1:07.04	Q
11	5	8	Olivia Klint Ipsa	Sweden	1:07.30	Q
12	5	2	Yuliya Efimova	Neutral Athletes B	1:07.38	Q
13	3	6	Florine Gaspard	Belgium	1:07.49	Q
14	5	1	Tina Čelik	Slovenia	1:07.54	Q, NR
15	3	0	Ralina Giliazova	Neutral Athletes B	1:07.70	
16	3	4	Anita Bottazzo	Italy	1:07.73	
17	4	2	Anastasia Gorbenko	Israel	1:07.79	Q
18	5	7	Ellie McCartney	Ireland	1:07.96	Q
19	3	2	Barbara Mazurkiewicz	Poland	1:08.14	
20	3	8	Clara Rybak-Andersen	Denmark	1:08.17	
21	2	7	Nikoletta Pavlopoulou	Greece	1:08.82	
21	4	7	Lena Ludwig	Germany	1:08.82	
23	3	7	Silje Rongevær Slyngstadli	Norway	1:08.87	
24	4	1	Martina Bukvić	Serbia	1:08.91	
25	4	0	Kay-Lyn Löhr	Switzerland	1:09.24	
26	3	9	Moa Bergdahl	Sweden	1:09.31	
27	5	0	Andromachi Tasakou	Greece	1:09.34	
28	2	6	Chiara Della Corte	Italy	1:09.44	
29	3	1	Diana Petkova	Bulgaria	1:09.46	
30	4	9	Egle Salu	Estonia	1:09.53	
31	2	5	Ana Rodrigues	Portugal	1:09.67	
32	2	3	Yana Klikotska	Ukraine	1:09.75	
33	2	2	Nikoleta Trníková	Slovakia	1:09.79	
34	2	4	Jenna Pulkkinen	Finland	1:09.90	
35	2	0	Iryna Miliutina	Ukraine	1:10.03	
36	5	9	Maria Erokhina	Cyprus	1:10.04	
37	1	4	Tea Winblad	Sweden	1:10.07	
38	1	3	Anastasia Basisto	Moldova	1:10.22	
39	2	9	Jenna Laukkanen	Finland	1:10.29	
40	1	5	Frida Stretre Løbersli	Norway	1:10.61	
41	2	1	Anniina Murto	Finland	1:10.99	
42	2	8	Birgitta Ingólfsdóttir	Iceland	1:12.66	
43	4	8	Teya Nikolova	Bulgaria	1:14.24	
44	1	6	Kiia Metsäkonkola	Finland	1:14.34	
45	1	2	Stella Gjoka	Albania	1:14.57	

=== Semifinals ===
The heats were started on 11 August at 18:54.
Qualification Rules: The 8 fastest from the heats qualify to the final.

Rank	Heat	Lane	Swimmer	Nation	Time	Notes
1	2	4	Angharad Evans	Great Britain	1:04.97	Q, CR
2	1	4	Mona McSharry	Ireland	1:05.64	Q
3	2	6	Eneli Jefimova	Estonia	1:05.78	Q
4	2	5	Benedetta Pilato	Italy	1:05.85	Q
5	1	3	Anna Elendt	Germany	1:05.92	Q
6	1	6	Evgeniia Chikunova	Neutral Athletes B	1:06.16	Q
7	2	3	Tes Schouten	Netherlands	1:06.36	Q
8	1	5	Lisa Angiolini	Italy	1:06.47	Q
9	1	2	Alina Zmushka	Neutral Athletes A	1:06.59	
10	2	2	Dominika Sztandera	Poland	1:07.00	
11	2	7	Olivia Klint Ipsa	Sweden	1:07.05	
12	2	8	Anastasia Gorbenko	Israel	1:07.11	
13	1	7	Yuliya Efimova	Neutral Athletes B	1:07.19	
14	2	1	Florine Gaspard	Belgium	1:07.83	
15	1	1	Tina Čelik	Slovenia	1:08.04	
16	1	8	Ellie McCartney	Ireland	1:08.37	

=== Final ===
The final was held on 12 August at 18:58.

Rank	Lane	Swimmer	Nation	Time	Notes
1st place, gold medalist(s)	4	Angharad Evans	Great Britain	1:04.87	CR
2nd place, silver medalist(s)	5	Mona McSharry	Ireland	1:05.41	NR
3rd place, bronze medalist(s)	6	Benedetta Pilato	Italy	1:05.89	
4	3	Eneli Jefimova	Estonia	1:05.94	
5	7	Evgeniia Chikunova	Neutral Athletes B	1:06.08	
6	1	Tes Schouten	Netherlands	1:06.31	
7	2	Anna Elendt	Germany	1:06.37	
8	8	Lisa Angiolini	Italy	1:06.73	
