= 2024 World Aquatics Swimming Championships (25 m) – Women's 100 metre breaststroke =

Swimming competition

Women's 100 metre breaststroke at the 2024 World Aquatics Swimming Championships (25 m)
- Venue: Duna Arena
- Location: Budapest, Hungary
- Dates: 11 December (heats and semifinals); 12 December (final)
- Competitors: 66 from 59 nations
- Winning time: 1:02.38

Medalists
gold medal	Tang Qianting	China
silver medal	Lilly King	United States
bronze medal	Eneli Jefimova	Estonia

The women's 100 metre breaststroke event at the 2024 World Aquatics Swimming Championships (25 m) was held from 11 to 12 December 2024 at the Duna Arena in Budapest, Hungary.

== Records ==
Prior to the competition, the existing world and championship records were as follows.

World record	Rūta Meilutytė (LTU) Alia Atkinson (JAM) Alia Atkinson (JAM)	1:02.36	Moscow, Russia Doha, Qatar Chartres, France	12 October 2013 6 December 2014 26 August 2016
Competition record	Alia Atkinson (JAM)	1:02.36	Doha, Qatar	6 December 2014

== Results ==
=== Heats ===
The heats were started on 11 December at 9:52.

Rank	Heat	Lane	Name	Nationality	Time	Notes
1	6	7	Angharad Evans	Great Britain	1:03.45	Q, NR
2	7	7	Lilly King	United States	1:03.50	Q
3	7	4	Tang Qianting	China	1:03.52	Q
4	6	3	Rūta Meilutytė	Lithuania	1:04.27	Q
5	6	4	Eneli Jefimova	Estonia	1:04.34	Q
6	5	5	Alina Zmushka	Neutral Athletes A	1:04.42	Q
6	6	6	Sophie Angus	Canada	1:04.42	Q
8	5	6	Rebecca Meder	South Africa	1:04.57	Q
9	6	5	Evgeniia Chikunova	Neutral Athletes B	1:04.61	Q
10	5	1	Kotryna Teterevkova	Lithuania	1:04.62	Q
11	7	3	Kotomi Kato	Japan	1:04.67	Q
12	5	2	Yuliya Yefimova	Neutral Athletes B	1:04.77	Q
13	6	1	Kristýna Horská	Czech Republic	1:04.78	Q, NR
13	7	0	Dominika Sztandera	Poland	1:04.78	Q
15	7	8	Emma Weber	United States	1:04.81	Q
16	7	5	Sophie Hansson	Sweden	1:04.97	Q
17	4	3	Henrietta Fángli	Hungary	1:05.09	R, NR
18	4	4	Olivia Klint Ipsa	Sweden	1:05.13	R
19	6	2	Clara Rybak-Andersen	Denmark	1:05.20	
20	5	4	Benedetta Pilato	Italy	1:05.30	
21	5	7	Park Si-eun	South Korea	1:05.36	NR
22	4	5	Lara van Niekerk	South Africa	1:05.57	
23	7	1	Diana Petkova	Bulgaria	1:05.78	
24	6	8	Silje Slyngstadli	Norway	1:05.82	
25	7	6	Yu Jingyao	China	1:05.83	
26	5	3	Andrea Podmaníková	Slovakia	1:05.84	
27	4	2	Sydney Pickrem	Canada	1:05.92	
28	7	9	Macarena Ceballos	Argentina	1:05.93	
29	7	2	Tara Kinder	Australia	1:06.29	
30	3	3	Lin Pei-wun	Chinese Taipei	1:06.43	NR
31	5	9	Veera Kivirinta	Finland	1:06.49	
32	4	6	Man Wui Kiu	Hong Kong	1:06.61	
33	4	0	Stefanía Gómez	Colombia	1:06.85	
34	5	0	Brearna Crawford	New Zealand	1:07.10	
35	4	9	Mercedes Toledo	Venezuela	1:07.19	
36	5	8	Meri Mataja	Croatia	1:07.24	
37	3	7	Lanihei Connolly	Cook Islands	1:07.36	NR
38	3	4	Emily Santos	Panama	1:07.37	NR
39	4	1	Phee Jinq En	Malaysia	1:07.40	
40	6	0	Niamh Coyne	Ireland	1:07.49	
41	4	7	Brigitta Vass	Romania	1:07.62	
42	4	8	Adelaida Pchelintseva	Kazakhstan	1:07.74	=NR
43	6	9	Ana Rodrigues	Portugal	1:07.82	
44	3	6	Lynn El Hajj	Lebanon	1:08.36	NR
45	3	2	Anastasia Basisto	Moldova	1:09.22	
46	1	3	Maria Erokhina	Cyprus	1:09.49	NR
47	3	5	Saovanee Boonamphai	Thailand	1:09.62	
48	3	8	Nàdia Tudó	Andorra	1:09.69	
49	1	6	Angelina Messina	Laos	1:09.95	
50	3	9	Imane Houda El Barodi	Morocco	1:10.08	
51	2	5	Marina Abu Shamaleh	Palestine	1:12.49	NR
52	2	4	Ellie Shaw	Antigua and Barbuda	1:12.98	NR
53	2	2	Duana Lama	Nepal	1:13.50	
54	2	7	Nicole Mack	Guatemala	1:13.64	
55	2	6	Will-Insha Jules-Marthe	Cape Verde	1:13.66	
56	2	3	Stella Gjoka	Albania	1:13.87	
57	2	1	Anaika Otway	Grenada	1:14.45	
58	3	0	Rhanishka Gibbs	Bahamas	1:14.99	
59	2	8	Vaoahi Afu	Tonga	1:16.15	
60	1	7	Yun-Suh Chang	Botswana	1:16.41	NR
61	2	9	Kestra Kihleng	Federated States of Micronesia	1:20.19	
62	1	4	Hamna Ahmed	Maldives	1:20.69	NR
63	2	0	Aynur Merdanova	Turkmenistan	1:22.04	
64	1	5	Ceylia Djeutcha	Cameroon	1:25.41	
65	1	2	Diaraye Bah	Guinea	1:28.18	
	3	1	Lea Højsted	Faroe Islands	Disqualified	

=== Semifinals ===
The semifinals were started on 11 December at 18:13.

Rank	Heat	Lane	Name	Nationality	Time	Notes
1	2	5	Tang Qianting	China	1:02.37	Q, AS
2	1	4	Lilly King	United States	1:03.23	Q
3	2	2	Evgeniia Chikunova	Neutral Athletes B	1:03.70	Q
4	2	4	Angharad Evans	Great Britain	1:03.71	Q
5	2	3	Eneli Jefimova	Estonia	1:03.80	Q
6	1	3	Alina Zmushka	Neutral Athletes A	1:03.89	Q, NR
7	1	6	Rebecca Meder	South Africa	1:04.04	Q
8	1	2	Kotryna Teterevkova	Lithuania	1:04.15	Q
9	1	1	Dominika Sztandera	Poland	1:04.23	R
10	1	7	Yuliya Yefimova	Neutral Athletes B	1:04.38	R
11	2	6	Sophie Angus	Canada	1:04.53	
12	2	7	Kotomi Kato	Japan	1:04.55	
13	1	5	Rūta Meilutytė	Lithuania	1:04.75	
14	2	1	Kristýna Horská	Czech Republic	1:04.78	NR
15	1	8	Sophie Hansson	Sweden	1:05.10	
16	2	8	Emma Weber	United States	1:05.36	

=== Final ===
The final was held on 12 December at 18:30.

Rank	Lane	Name	Nationality	Time	Notes
1st place, gold medalist(s)	4	Tang Qianting	China	1:02.38	
2nd place, silver medalist(s)	5	Lilly King	United States	1:02.80	
3rd place, bronze medalist(s)	2	Eneli Jefimova	Estonia	1:03.25	
4	7	Alina Zmushka	Neutral Athletes A	1:03.41	NR
5	3	Evgeniia Chikunova	Neutral Athletes B	1:03.79	
6	1	Rebecca Meder	South Africa	1:03.93	
7	6	Angharad Evans	Great Britain	1:04.08	
8	8	Kotryna Teterevkova	Lithuania	1:04.65	
