= Swimming at the 2026 European Aquatics Championships – Women's 50 metre breaststroke =

Women's 50 metre breaststroke at the 2026 European Aquatics Championships
- Venue: Paris Aquatic Centre
- Dates: 15 August (heats and semifinals); 16 August (final)
- Competitors: 41 from 26 nations
- Winning time: 29.93

Medalists
gold medal	Rūta Meilutytė	Lithuania
silver medal	Benedetta Pilato	Italy
bronze medal	Mona McSharry	Ireland

The Women's 50 metre breaststroke competition of the 2026 European Aquatics Championships was held on 15 and 16 August 2026.

== Records ==
Prior to the competition, the existing world, European and championship records were as follows.

	Name	Nationality	Time	Location	Date
World record	Rūta Meilutytė	Lithuania	29.16	Fukuoka	30 July 2023
European record	Rūta Meilutytė	Lithuania	29.16	Fukuoka	30 July 2023
Championship record	Benedetta Pilato	Italy	29.30	Budapest	22 May 2021

== Results ==
=== Heats ===
The heats began on 15 August at 10:24.
Qualification Rules: The 16 fastest from the heats qualify to the semifinals.

Rank	Heat	Lane	Swimmer	Country	Time	Notes
1	4	4	Benedetta Pilato	Italy	29.86	Q
2	5	3	Veera Kivirinta	Finland	30.17	Q
3	5	4	Rūta Meilutytė	Lithuania	30.21	Q
4	3	6	Mona McSharry	Ireland	30.37	Q
5	4	3	Florine Gaspard	Belgium	30.39	Q
6	5	5	Anna Elendt	Germany	30.53	Q
7	4	5	Anita Bottazzo	Italy	30.58	Q
8	5	6	Ralina Giliazova	Neutral Athletes B	30.59	Q
9	3	2	Egle Salu	Estonia	30.61	Q
9	4	6	Lisa Angiolini	Italy	30.61	
9	4	7	Dominika Sztandera	Poland	30.61	Q
12	3	4	Eneli Jefimova	Estonia	30.64	Q
13	4	8	Olivia Klint Ipsa	Sweden	30.89	Q
14	3	8	María Ramos	Spain	30.90	Q
15	3	3	Anastasia Gorbenko	Israel	30.91	Q
16	3	7	Kotryna Teterevkova	Lithuania	30.95	Q
17	5	1	Alina Zmushka	Neutral Athletes A	30.98	Q
18	5	0	Ana Rodrigues	Portugal	30.99	R
19	3	1	Diana Petkova	Bulgaria	31.07	R?
19	4	2	Yuliya Efimova	Neutral Athletes B	31.07	
21	5	2	Silje Rongevær Slyngstadli	Norway	31.18	
22	3	5	Barbara Mazurkiewicz	Poland	31.19	
23	4	1	Frida Stretre Lobersli	Norway	31.29	
24	4	0	Jimena Ruiz	Spain	31.46	
25	3	0	Anniina Murto	Finland	31.53	
26	2	2	Tina Čelik	Slovenia	31.55	
27	2	6	Iryna Miliutina	Ukraine	31.72	
28	5	9	Schastine Tabor	Denmark	31.76	
29	3	9	Lena Ludwig	Germany	31.84	
30	2	1	Andromachi Tasakou	Greece	31.87	
30	2	5	Moa Bergdahl	Sweden	31.87	
32	1	4	Maria Erokhina	Cyprus	32.04	
33	2	7	Clara Rybak-Andersen	Denmark	32.06	
34	2	4	Jenna Pulkkinen	Finland	32.13	
35	5	8	Meri Mataja	Croatia	32.19	
36	2	8	Martina Bukvić	Serbia	32.22	
37	1	5	Kay-Lyn Löhr	Switzerland	32.45	
38	2	3	Birgitta Ingólfsdóttir	Iceland	32.74	
39	4	9	Kiia Metsäkonkola	Finland	32.77	
40	5	7	Teya Nikolova	Bulgaria	32.79	
41	1	3	Stella Gjoka	Albania	33.28	

=== Semifinals ===
The semifinals were started on 15 August at 19:01.
Qualification Rules: The first 2 competitors of each semifinal and the remaining fastest (up to a total of 8 qualified competitors) from the semifinals advance to the final.

Rank	Heat	Lane	Name	Nationality	Time	Notes
1	2	4	Benedetta Pilato	Italy	29.84	Q
2	2	7	Eneli Jefimova	Estonia	29.93	Q
3	2	5	Rūta Meilutytė	Lithuania	30.05	Q
4	1	4	Veera Kivirinta	Finland	30.26	Q
5	1	3	Anna Elendt	Germany	30.34	Q
6	2	3	Florine Gaspard	Belgium	30.42	Q
7	1	5	Mona McSharry	Ireland	30.43	Q
8	2	1	María Ramos	Spain	30.47	Q, NR
9	1	6	Ralina Giliazova	Neutral Athletes B	30.55	
9	2	8	Kotryna Teterevkova	Lithuania	30.55	
11	1	2	Dominika Sztandera	Poland	30.58	
12	2	2	Egle Salu	Estonia	30.61	
13	2	6	Anita Bottazzo	Italy	30.65	
14	1	7	Olivia Klint Ipsa	Sweden	30.88	
15	1	8	Alina Zmushka	Neutral Athletes A	30.91	
16	1	1	Anastasia Gorbenko	Israel	32.50	

=== Final ===
The final took place on the evening of 16 August.

Rank	Lane	Name	Nationality	Time	Notes
1st place, gold medalist(s)	3	Rūta Meilutytė	Lithuania	29.93	
2nd place, silver medalist(s)	4	Benedetta Pilato	Italy	29.94	
3rd place, bronze medalist(s)	1	Mona McSharry	Ireland	29.95	NR
4	5	Eneli Jefimova	Estonia	30.00	
5	2	Anna Elendt	Germany	30.35	
6	6	Veera Kivirinta	Finland	30.41	
7	7	Florine Gaspard	Belgium	30.74	
8	8	María Ramos	Spain	30.95	
