= Swimming at the 2026 European Aquatics Championships – Women's 4 × 100 metre medley relay =

Women's 4 × 100 metre medley relay at the 2026 European Aquatics Championships
- Venue: Paris Aquatic Centre
- Dates: 16 August
- Competitors: 72 from 15 nations
- Teams: 15
- Winning time: 3:53.50 CR

Medalists
gold medal	Lauren Cox; Angharad Evans; Keanna Macinnes; Freya Colbert; Katie Shanahan; Emily Richards; Theodora Taylor	Great Britain
silver medal	Sara Curtis; Benedetta Pilato; Anita Gastaldi; Emma Virginia Menicucci; Lisa Angiolini	Italy
bronze medal	Alina Gaifutdinova; Evgeniia Chikunova; Daria Klepikova; Kira Manokhina; Yuliya Yefimova; Arina Surkova; Alexandra Kuznetsova

The Women's 4 × 100 metre medley relay competition of the 2026 European Aquatics Championships was held on 16 August 2026.

== Records ==
Prior to the competition, the existing world, European and championship records were as follows.

	Team	Time	Location	Date
World record	United States	3:49.34	Singapore	3 August 2025
European record	Russia	3:53.38	Budapest	30 July 2017
Championship record	Great Britain	3:54.01	Budapest	23 May 2021

== Results ==
=== Heats ===
The heats were started at 10:36.

Rank	Heat	Lane	Nation	Swimmers	Time	Notes
1	2	1	Italy	Sara Curtis (58.75); Lisa Angiolini (1:06.23); Anita Gastaldi (58.03); Emma Virginia Menicucci (54.10)	3:57.11	Q
2	1	4	Germany	Lise Seidel (1:00.85); Anna Elendt (1:06.13); Angelina Köhler (56.36); Nina Holt (53.78)	3:57.12	Q
3	2	7	Great Britain	Katie Shanahan (1:00.50); Angharad Evans (1:04.67); Emily Richards (58.48); Theodora Taylor (54.12)	3:57.77	Q
4	2	4	France	Pauline Mahieu (59.86); Chloé Braun (1:08.51); Marie Wattel (57.61); Albane Cachot (53.40)	3:59.38	Q
5	1	5	Neutral Athletes B	Alina Gaifutdinova (1:00.10); Yuliya Yefimova (1:07.45); Arina Surkova (57.89); Alexandra Kuznetsova (54.94)	4:00.38	Q
6	2	3	Netherlands	Maaike de Waard (1:00.50); Marrit Steenbergen (1:08.23); Kim Busch (58.69); Milou van Wijk (53.18)	4:00.60	Q
7	2	6	Ireland	Lottie Cullen (1:01.25); Mona McSharry (1:04.75); Ellie McCartney (1:00.83); Grace Davison (54.12)	4:00.95	Q
8	1	3	Spain	Irene Ciércoles (59.93); Alba Vázquez (1:07.98); Laura Cabanes (59.13); María Daza (54.28)	4:01.32	Q, NR
9	2	2	Poland	Adela Piskorska (1:01.03); Dominika Sztandera (1:06.97); Zuzanna Famulok (58.78); Barbara Leśniewska (55.32)	4:02.10	
10	2	5	Israel	Tom Mienis (1:00.48); Anastasia Gorbenko (1:07.31); Lea Polonsky (59.56); Daria Golovaty (54.84)	4:02.19	
11	1	7	Sweden	Louise Hansson (1:02.06); Olivia Klint Ipsa (1:07.37); Sara Junevik (58.05); Sofia Åstedt (54.76)	4:02.24	
12	1	2	Denmark	Emma Brogaard Krogh (1:01.32); Clara Rybak-Andersen (1:07.53); Schastine Tabor (59.08); Martine Damborg (54.50)	4:02.43	
13	1	1	Norway	Ingeborg Løyning (1:01.16); Silje Rongevær Slyngstadli (1:08.77); Sandra Maria Balto (59.53); Hedda Øritsland (56.03)	4:05.49	NR
14	2	8	Switzerland	Gaia Rasmussen (1:02.25); Kay-Lyn Löhr (1:08.73); Julia Ullmann (59.33); Angelina Patt (56.88 )	4:07.19	
	1	6	Greece	Eleni Antoniadou (1:02.77); Andromachi Tasakou (1:10.03); Anna Vlachou; Nikoletta Pavlopoulou	Disqualified	

=== Final ===
The final was held at 20:02.

Rank	Lane	Nation	Swimmers	Time	Notes
1st place, gold medalist(s)	3	Great Britain	Lauren Cox (59.67); Angharad Evans (1:03.75); Keanna Macinnes (56.81); Freya Colbert (53.27)	3:53.50	CR
2nd place, silver medalist(s)	4	Italy	Sara Curtis (58.43) NR; Benedetta Pilato (1:04.53); Anita Gastaldi (57.07); Emma Virginia Menicucci (53.57)	3:53.60	NR
3rd place, bronze medalist(s)	2	Neutral Athletes B	Alina Gaifutdinova (59.14); Evgeniia Chikunova (1:05.45); Daria Klepikova (55.65); Kira Manokhina (53.55)	3:53.79	
4	5	Germany	Lise Seidel (1:00.71); Anna Elendt (1:05.83); Angelina Köhler (56.26); Nina Holt (53.41)	3:56.21	
5	6	France	Mary-Ambre Moluh (58.62); Chloé Braun (1:08.13); Marie Wattel (56.65); Béryl Gastaldello (53.23)	3:56.63	
6	1	Ireland	Lottie Cullen (1:00.64); Mona McSharry (1:04.72); Ellen Walshe (57.73); Grace Davison (54.17)	3:57.26	NR
7	7	Netherlands	Maaike de Waard (1:00.21); Marrit Steenbergen (1:08.48); Tessa Giele (57.48); Milou van Wijk (53.16)	3:59.33	
8	8	Spain	Irene Ciércoles (1:00.22); Alba Vázquez (1:07.68); Laura Cabanes (58.71); María Daza (53.64)	4:00.25	NR
