= Swimming at the 2025 World Aquatics Championships – Women's 200 metre breaststroke =

Women's 200 metre breaststroke at the 2025 World Aquatics Championships
- Venue: World Aquatics Championships Arena
- Location: Singapore Sports Hub, Kallang, Singapore
- Dates: 31 July (heats and semifinals); 1 August (final)
- Competitors: 32 from 26 nations
- Winning time: 2:18.50

Medalists
gold medal	Kate Douglass	United States
silver medal	Evgeniia Chikunova
bronze medal	Kaylene Corbett	South Africa
bronze medal	Alina Zmushka

The women's 200 metre breaststroke event at the 2025 World Aquatics Championships was held from 31 July to 1 August 2025 at the World Aquatics Championships Arena at the Singapore Sports Hub in Kallang, Singapore.

== Background ==
The event is expected to be one of the closest races of the meet, with Olympic champion Kate Douglass and world record holder Evgeniia Chikunova racing each other in the long course version of the event for the first time. Chikunova leads the world this year with a 2:20.36 and holds the world record at 2:17.55. Douglass is ranked second this season with a 2:20.78 and won Olympic gold last year in 2:19.24.

Great Britain’s Angharad Evans (2:21.86) and American Alex Walsh (2:22.45) are the next fastest this season. Behind them, over a dozen swimmers are packed tightly between 2:23 and 2:24, including returning Olympic finalists and national record holders, making the remaining finals spots highly competitive.

== Qualification ==
Each National Federation was permitted to enter a maximum of two qualified athletes in each individual event, but they could do so only if both of them had attained the "A" standard qualification time. For this event, the "A" standard qualification time was 2:25.91 minutes. Federations could enter one athlete into the event if they met the "B" standard qualification time. For this event, the "B" standard qualification time was 2:31.02 minutes. Athletes could also enter the event if they had met an "A" or "B" standard in a different event and their Federation had not entered anyone else. Additional considerations applied to Federations who had few swimmers enter through the standard qualification times. Federations in this category could at least enter two men and two women to the competition, all of whom could enter into up to two events.

Top 10 fastest qualification times
Swimmer	Country	Time	Competition
Tatjana Smith	South Africa	2:19.01	2024 South African Championships
Kate Douglass	United States	2:19.24	2024 Summer Olympics
Evgeniia Chikunova	Individual Neutral Athletes	2:20.36	2025 Russian Championships
Tes Schouten	Netherlands	2:21.05	2024 Summer Olympics
Angharad Evans	Great Britain	2:21.86	2025 Great British Championships
Lilly King	United States	2:21.93	2024 United States Olympic Trials
Alex Walsh	United States	2:22.38	2024 United States Olympic Trials
Mona McSharry	Ireland	2:22.49	2024 Mel Zajac Jr. International
Satomi Suzuki	Japan	2:22.54	2024 Summer Olympics
Ye Shiwen	China	2:22.55	2024 Chinese Championships

== Records ==
Prior to the competition, the existing world and championship records were as follows.

World record	Evgeniia Chikunova (RUS)	2:17.55	Kazan, Russia	21 April 2023
Competition record	Rikke Møller Pedersen (DEN)	2:19.11	Barcelona, Spain	1 August 2013

The following new records were set during this competition.

Date	Event	Name	Nationality	Time	Record
1 August	Final	Kate Douglass	United States	2:18.50	CR

== Heats ==
The heats took place on 31 July at 10:53.

Rank	Heat	Lane	Swimmer	Nation	Time	Notes
1	3	4	Evgeniia Chikunova	Neutral Athletes B	2:22.30	Q
2	4	4	Kate Douglass	United States	2:23.28	Q
3	2	3	Alina Zmushka	Neutral Athletes A	2:24.24	Q
4	2	4	Angharad Evans	Great Britain	2:24.82	Q
5	3	8	Lyu Qinyao	China	2:24.93	Q
6	4	7	Clara Rybak-Andersen	Denmark	2:24.98	Q
7	3	3	Kaylene Corbett	South Africa	2:25.10	Q
8	2	7	Ellie McCartney	Ireland	2:25.22	Q
9	2	5	Satomi Suzuki	Japan	2:25.26	Q
10	2	6	Anna Elendt	Germany	2:25.43	Q
11	3	6	Kotryna Teterevkova	Lithuania	2:25.58	Q
12	4	3	Ella Ramsay	Australia	2:25.95	Q
13	4	2	Kristýna Horská	Czech Republic	2:26.29	Q
14	4	5	Alex Walsh	United States	2:26.56	Q
15	2	8	Park Si-eun	South Korea	2:26.74	Q
16	2	0	Macarena Ceballos	Argentina	2:26.82	Q
17	4	6	Mary-Sophie Harvey	Canada	2:26.95	
18	3	1	Lisa Angiolini	Italy	2:26.98	
19	2	2	Francesca Fangio	Italy	2:27.01	
20	2	1	Sophie Angus	Canada	2:27.51	
21	4	8	Emma Carrasco	Spain	2:27.80	
22	4	0	Letitia Sim	Singapore	2:27.91	
22	4	1	Kotomi Kato	Japan	2:27.91	
24	3	2	Rebecca Meder	South Africa	2:28.40	
25	3	7	Tara Kinder	Australia	2:29.32	
26	2	9	Lanihei Connolly	Cook Islands	2:29.87	NR
27	3	9	Emily Santos	Panama	2:30.95	
28	4	9	Maria Romanjuk	Estonia	2:32.56	
29	1	4	Jialian Candice Gao	Hong Kong	2:34.03	
30	1	6	Maria Erokhina	Cyprus	2:34.62	
31	1	5	Nàdia Tudó	Andorra	2:36.84	
32	1	3	Stephanie Iannaccone	Guatemala	2:37.06	
	3	0	Lisa Mamié	Switzerland	Did not start	
	3	5	Mona McSharry	Ireland	Did not start	

== Semifinals ==
The semifinals took place on 31 July at 19:45.

Rank	Heat	Lane	Swimmer	Nation	Time	Notes
1	2	4	Evgeniia Chikunova	Neutral Athletes B	2:20.65	Q
2	1	4	Kate Douglass	United States	2:20.96	Q
3	2	7	Kotryna Teterevkova	Lithuania	2:22.98	Q
4	1	5	Angharad Evans	Great Britain	2:23.32	Q
5	2	5	Alina Zmushka	Neutral Athletes A	2:23.33	Q
6	1	6	Ellie McCartney	Ireland	2:23.79	Q
7	2	6	Kaylene Corbett	South Africa	2:23.81	Q
8	1	3	Clara Rybak-Andersen	Denmark	2:24.10	Q
9	1	7	Ella Ramsay	Australia	2:24.24	
10	2	3	Lyu Qinyao	China	2:24.33	
11	1	2	Anna Elendt	Germany	2:24.39	
12	1	1	Alex Walsh	United States	2:25.16	
13	2	1	Kristýna Horská	Czech Republic	2:25.95	
14	2	2	Satomi Suzuki	Japan	2:26.44	
15	1	8	Macarena Ceballos	Argentina	2:28.30	
16	2	8	Park Si-eun	South Korea	2:29.67	

== Final ==
The final took place on 1 August at 20:08.

Rank	Lane	Swimmer	Nation	Time	Notes
1st place, gold medalist(s)	5	Kate Douglass	United States	2:18.50	CR, AM
2nd place, silver medalist(s)	4	Evgeniia Chikunova	Neutral Athletes B	2:19.96	
3rd place, bronze medalist(s)	1	Kaylene Corbett	South Africa	2:23.52	
3rd place, bronze medalist(s)	2	Alina Zmushka	Neutral Athletes A	2:23.52	
5	6	Angharad Evans	Great Britain	2:24.21	
6	3	Kotryna Teterevkova	Lithuania	2:24.25	
7	7	Ellie McCartney	Ireland	2:25.22	
8	8	Clara Rybak-Andersen	Denmark	2:25.36	
