= Swimming at the 2026 European Aquatics Championships – Women's 200 metre breaststroke =

Women's 200 metre breaststroke at the 2026 European Aquatics Championships
- Venue: Paris Aquatic Centre
- Dates: 13 August (heats and semifinals); 14 August (final)
- Competitors: 24 from 18 nations
- Winning time: 2:19.32 CR

Medalists
gold medal	Evgeniia Chikunova
silver medal	Angharad Evans	Great Britain
bronze medal	Mona McSharry	Ireland

The Women's 100 metre breaststroke competition of the 2026 European Aquatics Championships was held on 13 and 14 August 2026.

== Records ==
Prior to the competition, the existing world, European and championship records were as follows.

	Name	Nation	Time	Location	Date
World record	Evgeniia Chikunova	Russia	2:17.55	Kazan	21 April 2023
European record	Evgeniia Chikunova	Russia	2:17.55	Kazan	21 April 2023
Championship record	Rikke Møller Pedersen	Denmark	2:19.84	Berlin	22 August 2014

== Results ==
=== Heats ===
The heats were held on 13 August at 10:40.
Qualification Rules: The 16 fastest from the heats qualify to semifinals.

Rank	Heat	Lane	Swimmer	Nation	Time	Notes
1	3	4	Angharad Evans	Great Britain	2:22.66	Q
2	3	5	Mona McSharry	Ireland	2:23.37	Q
3	2	4	Evgeniia Chikunova	Neutral Athletes B	2:24.18	Q
4	2	3	Anna Elendt	Germany	2:25.56	Q
5	1	5	Kotryna Teterevkova	Lithuania	2:26.27	Q
6	3	3	Alina Zmushka	Neutral Athletes A	2:26.55	Q
7	1	4	Tes Schouten	Netherlands	2:26.69	Q
8	2	2	Nikoleta Trníková	Slovakia	2:26.84	Q
9	1	3	Ellie McCartney	Ireland	2:26.95	Q
10	3	6	Clara Rybak-Andersen	Denmark	2:27.19	Q
11	3	2	Lena Ludwig	Germany	2:27.89	Q
12	2	5	Lisa Angiolini	Italy	2:28.24	Q
13	1	6	Kay-Lyn Löhr	Switzerland	2:28.47	Q
14	1	2	Anna Pirovano	Italy	2:29.49	Q
15	1	7	Yana Klikotska	Ukraine	2:30.31	Q
16	1	8	Jenna Laukkanen	Finland	2:30.52	Q
17	2	1	Olivia Klint Ipsa	Sweden	2:30.78	
18	2	6	Eneli Jefimova	Estonia	2:30.82	
19	3	7	Martina Bukvić	Serbia	2:30.89	
20	3	8	Tea Winblad	Sweden	2:31.03	
21	2	7	Maria Erokhina	Cyprus	2:31.76	
22	1	1	Jenna Pulkkinen	Finland	2:32.92	
23	2	8	Emma Barthel	Luxembourg	2:33.93	
	3	1	Iryna Miliutina	Ukraine	DQ	

=== Semifinals ===
The semifinals were started on 13 August at 19:07.
Qualification Rules: The 8 fastest from the heats qualify to the final.

Rank	Heat	Lane	Swimmer	Nation	Time	Notes
1	2	5	Evgeniia Chikunova	Neutral Athletes B	2:20.71	Q
2	2	4	Angharad Evans	Great Britain	2:20.96	Q
3	2	6	Tes Schouten	Netherlands	2:23.26	Q
4	1	4	Mona McSharry	Ireland	2:23.53	Q
5	1	5	Anna Elendt	Germany	2:23.60	Q
6	2	3	Kotryna Teterevkova	Lithuania	2:24.08	Q
7	2	2	Ellie McCartney	Ireland	2:24.15	Q
8	1	3	Alina Zmushka	Neutral Athletes A	2:24.44	Q
9	1	7	Lisa Angiolini	Italy	2:24.68	
10	1	2	Clara Rybak-Andersen	Denmark	2:25.47	
11	1	6	Nikoleta Trníková	Slovakia	2:26.69	NR
12	2	8	Yana Klikotska	Ukraine	2:28.32	
13	2	1	Kay-Lyn Löhr	Switzerland	2:28.75	
14	2	7	Lena Ludwig	Germany	2:28.89	
15	1	1	Anna Pirovano	Italy	2:29.07	
16	1	8	Jenna Laukkanen	Finland	2:29.85	

=== Final ===
The final was held on 14 August at 18:43.

Rank	Lane	Name	Nationality	Time	Notes
1st place, gold medalist(s)	4	Evgeniia Chikunova	Neutral Athletes B	2:19.32	CR
2nd place, silver medalist(s)	5	Angharad Evans	Great Britain	2:21.21	
3rd place, bronze medalist(s)	6	Mona McSharry	Ireland	2:22.43	
4	3	Tes Schouten	Netherlands	2:22.67	
5	2	Anna Elendt	Germany	2:23.81	
6	7	Kotryna Teterevkova	Lithuania	2:23.92	
7	8	Alina Zmushka	Neutral Athletes A	2:25.24	
8	1	Ellie McCartney	Ireland	2:26.93	
