= Swimming at the 2020 Summer Olympics – Women's 4 × 100 metre medley relay =

Women's 4 × 100 metre medley relay at the Games of the XXXII Olympiad
- Venue: Tokyo Aquatics Centre
- Dates: 30 July 2021 (heats); 1 August 2021 (final)
- Competitors: 79 from 16 nations
- Teams: 16
- Winning time: 3:51.60 OR

Medalists
1st place, gold medalist(s)		Kaylee McKeown, Chelsea Hodges, Emma McKeon, Cate Campbell, Mollie O'Callaghan*, Emily Seebohm*, Brianna Throssell*	Australia
2nd place, silver medalist(s)		Regan Smith, Lydia Jacoby, Torri Huske, Abbey Weitzeil, Erika Brown*, Claire Curzan*, Lilly King*, Rhyan White*	United States
3rd place, bronze medalist(s)		Kylie Masse, Sydney Pickrem, Maggie Mac Neil, Penny Oleksiak, Taylor Ruck*, Kayla Sanchez*; *Indicates the swimmer only competed in the preliminary heats.	Canada

The women's 4 × 100 metre medley relay event at the 2020 Summer Olympics was held on 30 July and 1 August 2021 at the Tokyo Aquatics Centre. It was the event's sixteenth consecutive appearance, having been held at every edition since 1960.

The medals for the competition were presented by U.S. IOC Vice President Anita DeFrantz, and the gifts were presented by India's FINA Bureau Member Virendra Nanavati.

== Summary ==
In a close affair with the U.S., the Australian favourites prevailed to recapture their Olympic title after thirteen years. The three medallists in the individual 100 m backstroke led off their nation's respective relays, with Canada's Kylie Masse (57.90) edging out Australia's Kaylee McKeown (58.01) and the U.S.' Regan Smith (58.05). Though the U.S. led after the breaststroke leg, Chelsea Hodges was significantly faster than expected, splitting 1:05.57 to keep Australia within half a second of the Americans. Coming off her triumph in the 50 m freestyle earlier in the session, Emma McKeon (55.91) cut the U.S.' margin in half before stalwart Cate Campbell (52.11) delivered a perfect ending with an Olympic record of 3:51.60. By winning another gold, McKeon ended the meet as the most decorated Australian Olympian of all time with eleven medals to her name as well as just the second woman in history - after Soviet gymnast Maria Gorokhovskaya in 1952 - to win seven medals at a single Games.

Third after Smith's backstroke leg, 100 m breaststroke champion Lydia Jacoby (1:05.03) moved the U.S. into the lead, albeit the margin was not as large as expected given it was a shade off her flat-start winning time and Hodges's remarkable swim. Similarly, Torri Huske (56.16) also failed to replicate her flat-start time from the individual 100 m butterfly, narrowing the U.S.' lead to 0.25 seconds. Swimming the anchor leg, Abbey Weitzeil (52.49) could not contend with Campbell's speed as the U.S. settled for the silver in 3:51.73 - just 0.13 seconds behind the Australians. Notably, the U.S.' relative inexperience told as their relay changeover add-up of 1.05 seconds was the equal highest in the field (along with China) and more than half a second greater than the Australians' add-up of 0.49 seconds.

While Masse's lead-off leg put the Canadians in the lead, individual medley swimmer Sydney Pickrem had the slowest breaststroke leg in the field by more than half a second to have the Canadians in third at the 200 m mark. The 100 m butterfly champion Maggie Mac Neil then split a field-best 55.27 before 2016 100 m freestyle champion Penny Oleksiak (52.26) anchored the Canadians home in a bronze medal-winning and national record time of 3:52.60. It would also mark Canada's fourth podium finish in the event's history and their first since 1988. Despite receiving a strong butterfly split from Zhang Yufei (55.39), China could not step up on the podium as they finished in 3:54.13 for fourth, edging out Sweden (3:54.27), who broke their national record by almost a second. Italy (3:56.68) finished in a distant sixth spot ahead of ROC (3:56.93) and Japan (3:58.12).

== Records ==
Prior to this competition, the existing world and Olympic records were as follows.

World record	United States (USA); Regan Smith (57.57); Lilly King (1:04.81); Kelsi Dahlia (56.16); Simone Manuel (51.86)	3:50.40	Gwangju, South Korea	28 July 2019
Olympic record	United States; Missy Franklin (58.50); Rebecca Soni (1:04.82); Dana Vollmer (55.48); Allison Schmitt (53.25)	3:52.05	London, United Kingdom	4 August 2012

The following record was established during the competition:

Date	Event	Name	Nation	Time	Record
1 August	Final	Kaylee McKeown (58.01); Chelsea Hodges (1:05.57); Emma McKeon (55.91); Cate Campbell (52.11)	Australia	3:51.60	OR

== Qualification ==
The top 12 teams in this event at the 2019 World Aquatics Championships qualified for the Olympics. An additional 4 teams will qualify through having the fastest times at approved qualifying events during the qualifying period (1 March 2019 to 30 May 2020).

== Competition format ==
The competition consists of two rounds: heats and a final. The relay teams with the best 8 times in the heats advance to the final. Swim-offs are used as necessary to break ties for advancement to the next round.

== Schedule ==
All times are Japan Standard Time (UTC+9)

Date	Time	Round
30 July	20:57	Heats
1 August	11:15	Final

== Results ==
=== Heats ===
The relay teams with the top 8 times, regardless of heat, advanced to the final.

Rank	Heat	Lane	Nation	Swimmers	Time	Notes
1	2	5	Canada	Taylor Ruck (59.64); Sydney Pickrem (1:07.03); Maggie Mac Neil (55.82); Kayla Sanchez (52.68)	3:55.17	Q
2	2	4	United States	Rhyan White (59.19); Lilly King (1:05.51); Claire Curzan (57.65); Erika Brown (52.83)	3:55.18	Q
3	1	4	Australia	Emily Seebohm (59.37); Chelsea Hodges (1:06.16); Brianna Throssell (57.51); Mollie O'Callaghan (52.35)	3:55.39	Q
4	1	3	Italy	Margherita Panziera (1:00.55); Arianna Castiglioni (1:05.26); Elena Di Liddo (56.74); Federica Pellegrini (53.24)	3:55.79	Q, NR
5	2	6	Sweden	Michelle Coleman (1:00.73); Sophie Hansson (1:05.61); Louise Hansson (56.79); Sarah Sjöström (53.10)	3:56.23	Q
6	1	2	Japan	Anna Konishi (59.75); Kanako Watanabe (1:06.34); Rikako Ikee (57.50); Chihiro Igarashi (53.58)	3:57.17	Q
7	2	3	ROC	Anastasia Fesikova (1:00.26); Yuliya Yefimova (1:06.31); Svetlana Chimrova (56.95); Maria Kameneva (53.84)	3:57.36	Q
8	1	6	China	Chen Jie (1:00.62); Tang Qianting (1:05.73); Yu Yiting (57.84); Wu Qingfeng (53.51)	3:57.70	Q
9	1	5	Great Britain	Cassie Wild (1:01.10); Sarah Vasey (1:06.49); Harriet Jones (57.95); Freya Anderson (52.58)	3:58.12	
10	2	2	Netherlands	Kira Toussaint (58.99); Tes Schouten (1:09.98); Maaike de Waard (58.01); Femke Heemskerk (52.91)	3:59.89	
11	1	7	Germany	Laura Riedemann (1:00.45); Anna Elendt (1:06.17); Lisa Höpink (58.87); Annika Bruhn (54.67)	4:00.16	
12	2	7	Belarus	Anastasiya Shkurdai (1:00.64); Alina Zmushka (1:07.25); Anastasiya Kuliashova (57.37); Nastassia Karakouskaya (55.23)	4:00.49	
13	2	1	Hong Kong	Toto Wong (1:01.61); Jamie Yeung (1:08.69); Siobhán Haughey (57.67); Camille Cheng (54.89)	4:02.86	
14	1	1	South Africa	Mariella Venter (1:01.03); Tatjana Schoenmaker (1:07.41); Erin Gallagher (59.76); Aimee Canny (54.82)	4:03.02	
15	2	8	Denmark	Karoline Sørensen (1:02.53); Clara Rybak-Andersen (1:08.09); Emilie Beckmann (58.99); Signe Bro (54.43)	4:04.04	
16	1	8	Spain	África Zamorano (1:01.78); Jessica Vall (1:07.37); Mireia Belmonte (1:00.88); Lidón Muñoz (54.11)	4:04.14	

=== Final ===
Rank	Lane	Nation	Swimmers	Time	Notes
1st place, gold medalist(s)	3	Australia	Kaylee McKeown (58.01); Chelsea Hodges (1:05.57); Emma McKeon (55.91); Cate Campbell (52.11)	3:51.60	OR, OC
2nd place, silver medalist(s)	5	United States	Regan Smith (58.05); Lydia Jacoby (1:05.03); Torri Huske (56.16); Abbey Weitzeil (52.49)	3:51.73	
3rd place, bronze medalist(s)	4	Canada	Kylie Masse (57.90); Sydney Pickrem (1:07.17); Maggie Mac Neil (55.27); Penny Oleksiak (52.26)	3:52.60	NR
4	8	China	Peng Xuwei (59.63); Tang Qianting (1:06.09); Zhang Yufei (55.39); Yang Junxuan (53.02)	3:54.13	
5	2	Sweden	Michelle Coleman (59.75); Sophie Hansson (1:05.67); Louise Hansson (56.12); Sarah Sjöström (52.73)	3:54.27	NR
6	6	Italy	Margherita Panziera (1:00.03); Martina Carraro (1:05.88); Elena Di Liddo (56.96); Federica Pellegrini (53.81)	3:56.68	
7	1	ROC	Maria Kameneva (59.95); Evgeniia Chikunova (1:05.99); Svetlana Chimrova (56.70); Arina Surkova (54.29)	3:56.93	
8	7	Japan	Anna Konishi (59.92); Kanako Watanabe (1:06.61); Rikako Ikee (57.92); Chihiro Igarashi (53.67)	3:58.12	
