= Swimming at the 2024 Summer Olympics – Women's 100-metre breaststroke =

Women's 100-metre breaststroke at the Games of the XXXIII Olympiad
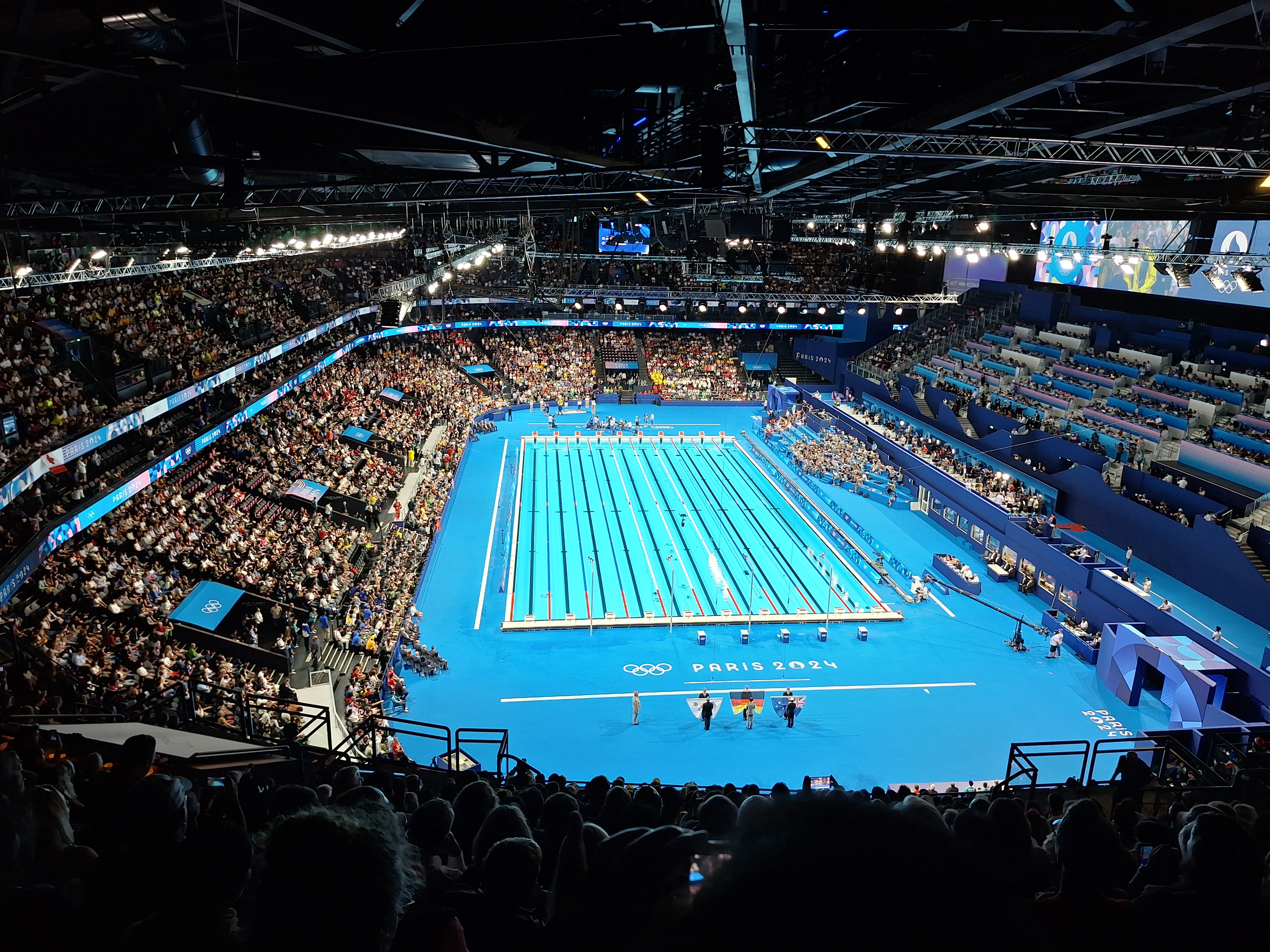
- Paris La Défense Arena after it was converted to a swimming pool for the swimming events
- Venue: Paris La Défense Arena
- Dates: 28 July 2024 (Heats and Semis); 29 July 2024 (Final)
- Competitors: 37 from 32 nations
- Winning time: 1:05.28

Medalists
1st place, gold medalist(s)		Tatjana Smith	South Africa
2nd place, silver medalist(s)		Tang Qianting	China
3rd place, bronze medalist(s)		Mona McSharry	Ireland

The women's 100-metre breaststroke event at the 2024 Summer Olympics was held from 28 to 29 July 2024 at Paris La Défense Arena, which was converted to a swimming pool for the swimming events.

China's Tang Qianting was the favourite to win, though Lithuania's Rūta Meilutytė, the US's Lilly King, Italy's Benedetta Pilato and South Africa's Tatjana Smith were also in contention to win medals. All except Meilutytė qualified for the final. In the semifinals, national records for Ireland and Belarus were broken.

In the final, Smith won gold with the winning time of 1:05.28. Tang finished second with 1:05.54 and Ireland's Mona McSharry won bronze with 1:05.59, 0.01 seconds ahead of both Pilato and King, who tied for fourth with 1:05.60. McSharry's bronze made her Ireland's first swimming medallist since 1996 and second swimming medallist ever.

== Background ==
The defending champion, Lydia Jacoby, failed to qualify after placing third in the 2024 United States Olympic trials held over a month earlier. China's Tang Qianting won the event at the 2024 World Championships, and had the fastest qualifying time of 1:04.39. Lithuania's Rūta Meilutytė won the event at the 2023 Championships, where she swam the fastest qualifying time of 1:04.62. She had had a foot surgery in February to fix an injury, which doctors estimated would take around two months to recover from. Retta Race from SwimSwam commented that it "put a question mark" on her form.

The US' Lilly King won the event at the 2016 Olympics, and she had the third fastest qualifying time of 1:04.75, while Italy's Benedetta Pilato won it at the 2022 World Championships, and she had the fourth fastest qualifying time of 1:05.44. South Africa's Tatjana Smith finished second at the 2020 Olympics, and she finished second again at the 2023 World Championships.

Both SwimSwam and Swimming World predicted Tang would win gold. SwimSwam predicted Smith would win silver and King would take bronze, while Swimming World predicted it would be the other way around.

The event was held at Paris La Défense Arena, which was converted to a swimming pool for the swimming events.

== Qualification ==
Each National Olympic Committee (NOC) was permitted to enter a maximum of two qualified athletes in each individual event, but only if both of them had attained the Olympic Qualifying Time (OQT). For this event, the OQT was 1:06.79 seconds. World Aquatics then considered athletes qualifying through universality; NOCs were given one event entry for each gender, which could be used by any athlete regardless of qualification time, providing the spaces had not already been taken by athletes from that nation who had achieved the OQT. Finally, the rest of the spaces were filled by athletes who had met the Olympic Consideration Time (OCT), which was 1:07.12 for this event. In total, 23 athletes qualified through achieving the OQT, twelve athletes qualified through universality places and two athletes qualified through achieving the OCT.

Top 10 fastest qualification times
Swimmer	Country	Time	Competition
Tang Qianting	China	01:04:39	2024 Chinese Championships
Rūta Meilutytė	Lithuania	01:04:62	2023 World Aquatics Championships
Lilly King	United States	01:04:75	2023 United States National Championships
Benedetta Pilato	Italy	01:05:44	2024 Sette Colli Trophy
Tatjana Smith	South Africa	01:05:53	2023 World Aquatics Championships
Angharad Evans	Great Britain	01:05:54	2024 AP Race London International
Mona McSharry	Ireland	01:05:55	2023 World Aquatics Championships
Tes Schouten	Netherlands	01:05:71	2024 Eindhoven Qualification Meet
Reona Aoki	Japan	01:05:76	2024 Japanese Olympic Trials
Sophie Hansson	Sweden	01:05:83	2024 Stockholm Open

== Heats ==
Five heats (preliminary rounds) took place on 28 July 2024, starting at 11:27. (Note: All times are Central European Summer Time (UTC+2)) The swimmers with the best 16 times in the heats advanced to the semifinals. Smith qualified with the fastest time of 1:05.00, while Tang, King, Pilato and Meilutytė also all qualified, among others. Israel's Anastasia Gorbenko qualified with the seventh fastest time, but withdrew to focus on her other events at the Games. This opened up the spot for China's Yang Chang, who swam the 17th fastest time, to qualify.

Results
Rank	Heat	Lane	Swimmer	Nation	Time	Notes
1	4	5	Tatjana Smith	South Africa	1:05.00	Q
2	5	4	Tang Qianting	China	1:05.63	Q
3	5	3	Mona McSharry	Ireland	1:05.74	Q
4	4	6	Satomi Suzuki	Japan	1:06.04	Q
5	3	4	Lilly King	United States	1:06.10	Q
6	5	5	Benedetta Pilato	Italy	1:06.19	Q
7	3	2	Anastasia Gorbenko	Israel	1:06.22	Q, WD
8	5	7	Eneli Jefimova	Estonia	1:06.24	Q
9	4	4	Rūta Meilutytė	Lithuania	1:06.34	Q
10	4	1	Alina Zmushka	Individual Neutral Athletes	1:06.37	Q
10	3	6	Lisa Angiolini	Italy	1:06.37	Q
12	3	5	Angharad Evans	Great Britain	1:06.38	Q
13	5	6	Sophie Hansson	Sweden	1:06.66	Q
14	4	3	Tes Schouten	Netherlands	1:06.69	Q
15	5	2	Kotryna Teterevkova	Lithuania	1:06.76	Q
16	4	8	Macarena Ceballos	Argentina	1:06.89	Q
17	4	7	Yang Chang	China	1:06.91	q
18	5	8	Sophie Angus	Canada	1:06.93	
19	3	3	Reona Aoki	Japan	1:06.98	
20	3	1	Anna Elendt	Germany	1:07.00	
21	5	1	Dominika Sztandera	Poland	1:07.22	
22	2	4	Jenna Strauch	Australia	1:07.27	
23	3	8	Lisa Mamié	Switzerland	1:07.65	
23	4	2	Emma Weber	United States	1:07.65	
25	3	7	Letitia Sim	Singapore	1:07.75	
26	2	3	Ida Hulkko	Finland	1:08.73	
27	2	5	Jessica Vall	Spain	1:08.78	
28	2	6	Kristýna Horská	Czech Republic	1:08.96	
29	2	2	Stefanía Gómez	Colombia	1:09.16	
30	2	7	Emily Santos	Panama	1:09.94	
31	2	1	Lynn El Hajj	Lebanon	1:10.27	
32	2	8	Lanihei Connolly	Cook Islands	1:10.45	
33	1	4	Rouxin Tan	Malaysia	1:12.50	
34	1	5	Imane El Barodi	Morocco	1:14.57	
35	1	3	Ellie Shaw	Antigua and Barbuda	1:14.78	
36	1	6	Aminata Barrow	The Gambia	1:15.12	
37	1	2	Lara Dashti	Kuwait	1:15.67	NR

== Semifinals ==
Two semifinals took place on 28 July, starting at 21:10. The swimmers with the best eight times in the semifinals advanced to the final. Tang won the first semifinal with the fourth fastest qualifying time of 1:05.83, while Smith won the second semifinal with the fastest qualifying time of 1:05.00. King and Pilato also qualified, though Meilutytė did not. Ireland's Mona McSharry qualified with the second fastest time of 1:05.51, which broke her own Irish record in the event. Neutral Athlete Alina Zmushka swam a time of 1:05.93 to qualify, which broke the Belarusian record. (Note: Russian and Belarusian athletes were only eligible to compete at the Games as Individual Neutral Athletes, due to the Russian invasion of Ukraine.)

Results
Rank	Heat	Lane	Swimmer	Nation	Time	Notes
1	2	4	Tatjana Smith	South Africa	1:05.00	Q
2	2	5	Mona McSharry	Ireland	1:05.51	Q, NR
3	2	3	Lilly King	United States	1:05.64	Q
4	1	4	Tang Qianting	China	1:05.83	Q
5	1	2	Alina Zmushka	Individual Neutral Athletes	1:05.93	Q, NR
6	2	7	Angharad Evans	Great Britain	1:05.99	Q
7	1	3	Benedetta Pilato	Italy	1:06.12	Q
8	2	6	Eneli Jefimova	Estonia	1:06.23	Q
9	1	6	Lisa Angiolini	Italy	1:06.39	
10	2	1	Tes Schouten	Netherlands	1:06.56	
11	2	2	Rūta Meilutytė	Lithuania	1:06.89	
12	1	5	Satomi Suzuki	Japan	1:06.90	
13	1	7	Sophie Hansson	Sweden	1:06.96	
14	1	8	Yang Chang	China	1:07.20	
15	2	8	Macarena Ceballos	Argentina	1:07.31	
16	1	1	Kotryna Teterevkova	Lithuania	1:07.48	

== Final ==
The final took place at 21:34 on 29 July. Tang swam the fastest first 50 metres, touching the wall at the end of the first length in 29.94, however Smith overtook her over the second half of the race to win with a time of 1:05.28. Tang finished second with 1:05.54 and McSharry finished third with 1:05.59, 0.01 seconds ahead of both Pilato and King, who tied for fourth with 1:05.60.

McSharry winning the bronze medal made her Ireland's first swimming medallist since 1996 and second Irish swimming medallist ever. It was also Ireland's first medal of the Games in any sport. At 27 years old, Smith became the oldest person to win a medal in this event at the Olympics.

Results
Rank	Lane	Swimmer	Nation	Time	Notes
1st place, gold medalist(s)	4	Tatjana Smith	South Africa	1:05.28	
2nd place, silver medalist(s)	6	Tang Qianting	China	1:05.54	
3rd place, bronze medalist(s)	5	Mona McSharry	Ireland	1:05.59	
4	1	Benedetta Pilato	Italy	1:05.60	
4	3	Lilly King	United States	1:05.60	
6	7	Angharad Evans	Great Britain	1:05.85	
7	8	Eneli Jefimova	Estonia	1:06.50	
8	2	Alina Zmushka	Individual Neutral Athletes	1:06.54	

Statistics
Name	15 metre split (s)	50 metre split (s)	50–65 metre split (s)	Time (s)	Stroke rate (strokes/min)
Tatjana Smith	7.18	30.62	9.98	1:05.28	47.1
Tang Qianting	6.95	29.94	10.03	1:05.54	52.5
Mona McSharry	7.50	30.56	9.84	1:05.59	50.3
Benedetta Pilato	7.07	30.62	9.84	1:05.60	45.7
Lilly King	7.13	31.00	9.79	1:05.60	49.1
Angharad Evans	7.53	30.61	10.13	1:05.85	44.9
Eneli Jefimova	7.47	30.69	10.08	1:06.50	53.0
Alina Zmushka	7.33	31.12	9.98	1:06.54	50.9
