= Swimming at the 2020 Summer Olympics – Women's 100 metre breaststroke =

Women's 100 metre breaststroke at the Games of the XXXII Olympiad
- Venue: Tokyo Aquatics Centre
- Dates: 25 July 2021 (heats); 26 July 2021 (semifinals); 27 July 2021 (final)
- Competitors: 45 from 38 nations
- Winning time: 1:04.95

Medalists
1st place, gold medalist(s)		Lydia Jacoby	United States
2nd place, silver medalist(s)		Tatjana Schoenmaker	South Africa
3rd place, bronze medalist(s)		Lilly King	United States

The women's 100 metre breaststroke event at the 2020 Summer Olympics was held from 25 July to 27 July 2021 at the Tokyo Aquatics Centre. It was the event's fourteenth consecutive appearance, having been held at every edition since 1968.

== Summary ==
The U.S.' teen Lydia Jacoby upset South Africa's Tatjana Schoenmaker and defending champion Lilly King to capture the sprint breaststroke title. Hanging with the leaders at the turn, Jacoby broke away over the final 20 metres to win gold by almost three tenths of a second in 1:04.95. With the performance, Jacoby became just the sixth woman in history to break the 1:05 barrier. First at the turn, Schoenmaker could not contend with Jacoby's blistering final lap and settled for silver in a time of 1:05.22, 0.4 seconds shy off her Olympic record in the heats. Meanwhile, Jacoby's teammate and 2016 champion Lilly King was 0.03 seconds ahead of Jacoby at the turn but could not fend off the youngster's charge, taking bronze in 1:05.54.

ROC's Evgeniia Chikunova delivered a time of 1:05.90 to pick up the fourth spot, just ahead of teammate and defending silver medallist Yuliya Yefimova (1:06.02) by about a tenth of a second. Sweden's Sophie Hansson placed sixth in 1:06.07, while Martina Carraro (1:06.19) and Ireland's Mona McSharry (1:06.94) rounded out the championship field.

== Records ==
Prior to this competition, the existing world and Olympic records were as follows.

World record	Lilly King (USA)	1:04.13	Budapest, Hungary	25 July 2017
Olympic record	Lilly King (USA)	1:04.93	Rio de Janeiro, Brazil	8 August 2016

The following records were established during the competition:

Date	Event	Swimmer	Nation	Time	Record
July 25	Heat 5	Tatjana Schoenmaker	South Africa	1:04.82	OR

== Qualification ==
The Olympic Qualifying Time for the event is 1:07.07. Up to two swimmers per National Olympic Committee (NOC) can automatically qualify by swimming that time at an approved qualification event. The Olympic Selection Time is 1:09.08. Up to one swimmer per NOC meeting that time is eligible for selection, allocated by world ranking until the maximum quota for all swimming events is reached. NOCs without a female swimmer qualified in any event can also use their universality place.

== Competition format ==
The competition consisted of three rounds: heats, semifinals, and a final. The swimmers with the best 16 times in the heats advanced to the semifinals. The swimmers with the best 8 times in the semifinals advanced to the final. Swim-offs are used as necessary to break ties for advancement to the next round.

== Schedule ==
All times are Japan Standard Time (UTC+9)

Date	Time	Round
25 July	19:34	Heats
26 July	10:50	Semifinals
27 July	11:17	Final

== Results ==
=== Heats ===
The swimmers with the top 16 times, regardless of heat, advanced to the semifinals.

Rank	Heat	Lane	Swimmer	Nation	Time	Notes
1	5	5	Tatjana Schoenmaker	South Africa	1:04.82	Q, OR, AF
2	5	4	Lydia Jacoby	United States	1:05.52	Q
3	6	4	Lilly King	United States	1:05.55	Q
4	6	5	Sophie Hansson	Sweden	1:05.66	Q, NR
5	6	3	Martina Carraro	Italy	1:05.85	Q
6	6	6	Evgeniia Chikunova	ROC	1:06.16	Q
7	6	8	Ida Hulkko	Finland	1:06.19	Q, NR
8	4	4	Yuliya Yefimova	ROC	1:06.21	Q
9	5	6	Mona McSharry	Ireland	1:06.39	Q
10	4	3	Tang Qianting	China	1:06.47	Q
11	6	2	Sarah Vasey	Great Britain	1:06.61	Q
12	5	3	Chelsea Hodges	Australia	1:06.70	Q
13	5	7	Lisa Mamié	Switzerland	1:06.76	Q
14	5	2	Eneli Jefimova	Estonia	1:06.79	Q
15	3	1	Kotryna Teterevkova	Lithuania	1:06.82	Q
16	3	2	Anna Elendt	Germany	1:06.96	Q
17	4	2	Kanako Watanabe	Japan	1:07.01	
18	5	1	Jessica Vall	Spain	1:07.07	
19	4	6	Reona Aoki	Japan	1:07.29	
20	4	1	Jessica Hansen	Australia	1:07.50	
21	4	7	Alina Zmushka	Belarus	1:07.58	
22	3	6	Alia Atkinson	Jamaica	1:07.70	
23	4	8	Kelsey Wog	Canada	1:07.73	
24	6	7	Kierra Smith	Canada	1:07.87	
25	3	4	Tes Schouten	Netherlands	1:07.89	
26	3	5	Fanny Lecluyse	Belgium	1:07.93	
27	6	1	Emelie Fast	Sweden	1:07.98	
28	2	3	Andrea Podmaníková	Slovakia	1:08.36	NR
29	2	5	Phee Jinq En	Malaysia	1:08.40	NR
30	3	7	Melissa Rodríguez	Mexico	1:08.76	
31	3	3	Julia Sebastián	Argentina	1:09.35	
32	2	7	Tilali Scanlan	American Samoa	1:10.01	
33	2	4	Ema Rajić	Croatia	1:10.02	
34	3	8	Diana Petkova	Bulgaria	1:10.61	
35	2	6	Emily Santos	Panama	1:12.10	
36	2	8	Kirsten Fisher-Marsters	Cook Islands	1:13.98	
37	1	3	Emilie Grand'Pierre	Haiti	1:14.82	NR
38	2	2	Alicia Kok Shun	Mauritius	1:15.42	
39	1	5	Darya Semyonova	Turkmenistan	1:16.37	
40	1	4	Jayla Pina	Cape Verde	1:16.96	
41	1	2	Taeyanna Adams	Federated States of Micronesia	1:25.36	
42	1	7	Nooran Ba-Matraf	Yemen	1:27.79	
43	1	6	Aishath Sajina	Maldives	1:33.59	
—	2	1	Claudia Verdino	Monaco	DSQ	
—	4	5	Benedetta Pilato	Italy	DSQ	
—	1	1	Mariama Toure	Guinea	DNS	
—	5	8	Anastasia Gorbenko	Israel	DNS	

=== Semifinals ===
The swimmers with the best 8 times, regardless of heat, advanced to the final.

Rank	Heat	Lane	Swimmer	Nation	Time	Notes
1	2	4	Tatjana Schoenmaker	South Africa	1:05.07	Q
2	2	5	Lilly King	United States	1:05.40	Q
3	1	4	Lydia Jacoby	United States	1:05.72	Q
4	1	5	Sophie Hansson	Sweden	1:05.81	Q
5	1	6	Yuliya Yefimova	ROC	1:06.34	Q
6	1	3	Evgeniia Chikunova	ROC	1:06.47	Q
7	2	3	Martina Carraro	Italy	1:06.50	Q
8	2	2	Mona McSharry	Ireland	1:06.59	Q
9	1	7	Chelsea Hodges	Australia	1:06.60	
10	1	2	Tang Qianting	China	1:06.63	
11	2	7	Sarah Vasey	Great Britain	1:06.87	
12	2	6	Ida Hulkko	Finland	1:07.02	
13	1	8	Anna Elendt	Germany	1:07.31	
14	2	8	Kotryna Teterevkova	Lithuania	1:07.39	
15	2	1	Lisa Mamié	Switzerland	1:07.41	
16	1	1	Eneli Jefimova	Estonia	1:07.58	

=== Final ===
Rank	Lane	Swimmer	Nation	Time	Notes
1st place, gold medalist(s)	3	Lydia Jacoby	United States	1:04.95	
2nd place, silver medalist(s)	4	Tatjana Schoenmaker	South Africa	1:05.22	
3rd place, bronze medalist(s)	5	Lilly King	United States	1:05.54	
4	7	Evgeniia Chikunova	ROC	1:05.90	
5	2	Yuliya Yefimova	ROC	1:06.02	
6	6	Sophie Hansson	Sweden	1:06.07	
7	1	Martina Carraro	Italy	1:06.19	
8	8	Mona McSharry	Ireland	1:06.94	
