= Swimming at the 2020 Summer Olympics – Women's 200 metre breaststroke =

Women's 200 metre breaststroke at the Games of the XXXII Olympiad
- Venue: Tokyo Aquatics Centre
- Dates: 28 July 2021 (heats); 29 July 2021 (semifinals); 30 July 2021 (final)
- Competitors: 31 from 24 nations
- Winning time: 2:18.95 WR

Medalists
| 1st place, gold medalist(s) | | Tatjana Schoenmaker | South Africa |
| 2nd place, silver medalist(s) | | Lilly King | United States |
| 3rd place, bronze medalist(s) | | Annie Lazor | United States |

The women's 200 metre breaststroke event at the 2020 Summer Olympics was held from 28 to 30 July 2021 at the Tokyo Aquatics Centre. It was the event's twenty-third consecutive appearance, having been held at every edition since 1924.

== Summary ==
South Africa's Tatjana Schoenmaker came from behind to become her nation's first Olympic champion in this event since Penny Heyns in 1996. Trailing the U.S.' Lilly King at the halfway mark, Schoenmaker moved through the field in the penultimate lap. Almost half a second ahead of world record pace at the final turn, Schoenmaker closed strongly to become the first woman to break the 2:19 barrier and win gold in a world record time of 2:18.95.

King, a 100 m breaststroke specialist over the years, established an early lead out of lane 2. However, King could not hold off Schoenmaker's ferocious charge over the back-half and settled for silver in 2:19.92. Meanwhile, King's teammate Annie Lazor (2:20.84) had the fastest final lap in the field, edging out ROC's Evgeniia Chikunova (2:20.88) by four one-hundredths of a second to claim bronze. More than a second back, Schoenmaker's teammate Kaylene Corbett (2:22.06) took fifth, while 2016 Olympian Molly Renshaw of Great Britain (2:22.65) and her teammate Abbie Wood (2:23.72) placed sixth and seventh. Belgium's Fanny Lecluyse (2:24.57) rounded out the championship field.

== Records ==
Prior to this competition, the existing world and Olympic records were as follows.

| World record | Rikke Møller Pedersen (DEN) | 2:19.11 | Barcelona, Spain | 1 August 2013 |
| Olympic record | Rebecca Soni (USA) | 2:19.59 | London, United Kingdom | 2 August 2012 |

The following records were established during the competition:

| Date | Event | Swimmer | Nation | Time | Record |
|---|---|---|---|---|---|
| July 28 | Heat 4 | Tatjana Schoenmaker | South Africa | 2:19.16 | OR |
| July 30 | Final | Tatjana Schoenmaker | South Africa | 2:18.95 | WR |

== Qualification ==
The Olympic Qualifying Time for the event is 2:25.52. Up to two swimmers per National Olympic Committee (NOC) can automatically qualify by swimming that time at an approved qualification event. The Olympic Selection Time is 2:29.89. Up to one swimmer per NOC meeting that time is eligible for selection, allocated by world ranking until the maximum quota for all swimming events is reached. NOCs without a female swimmer qualified in any event can also use their universality place.

== Competition format ==
The competition consists of three rounds: heats, semifinals, and a final. The swimmers with the best 16 times in the heats advance to the semifinals. The swimmers with the best 8 times in the semifinals advance to the final. Swim-offs are used as necessary to break ties for advancement to the next round.

== Schedule ==
All times are Japan Standard Time (UTC+9)

| Date | Time | Round |
|---|---|---|
| 28 July 2021 | 19:36 | Heats |
| 29 July 2021 | 11:54 | Semifinals |
| 30 July 2021 | 10:41 | Final |

== Results ==
=== Heats ===
The swimmers with the top 16 times, regardless of heat, advanced to the semifinals.

| Rank | Heat | Lane | Swimmer | Nation | Time | Notes |
|---|---|---|---|---|---|---|
| 1 | 4 | 4 | Tatjana Schoenmaker | South Africa | 2:19.16 | Q, OR, AF |
| 2 | 3 | 5 | Lilly King | United States | 2:22.10 | Q |
| 3 | 4 | 5 | Evgenia Chikunova | ROC | 2:22.16 | Q |
| 4 | 2 | 7 | Kaylene Corbett | South Africa | 2:22.48 | Q |
| 5 | 3 | 4 | Annie Lazor | United States | 2:22.76 | Q |
| 6 | 2 | 4 | Molly Renshaw | Great Britain | 2:22.99 | Q |
| 7 | 2 | 3 | Maria Temnikova | ROC | 2:23.13 | Q |
| 8 | 2 | 1 | Yu Jingyao | China | 2:23.17 | Q |
| 9 | 4 | 2 | Jenna Strauch | Australia | 2:23.30 | Q |
| 10 | 3 | 2 | Jessica Vall | Spain | 2:23.31 | Q |
| 11 | 2 | 2 | Fanny Lecluyse | Belgium | 2:23.42 | Q |
| 12 | 4 | 8 | Sophie Hansson | Sweden | 2:23.82 | Q |
| 13 | 2 | 6 | Francesca Fangio | Italy | 2:23.89 | Q |
| 14 | 4 | 3 | Lisa Mamié | Switzerland | 2:23.91 | Q |
| 15 | 2 | 5 | Abbie Wood | Great Britain | 2:24.13 | Q |
| 16 | 4 | 6 | Kelsey Wog | Canada | 2:24.27 | Q |
| 17 | 4 | 7 | Abbey Harkin | Australia | 2:24.41 | |
| 18 | 3 | 6 | Kanako Watanabe | Japan | 2:24.73 | |
| 19 | 1 | 4 | Kristýna Horská | Czech Republic | 2:25.03 | NR |
| 20 | 1 | 6 | Mona McSharry | Ireland | 2:25.08 | NR |
| 21 | 4 | 1 | Martina Carraro | Italy | 2:26.17 | |
| 22 | 3 | 7 | Marina García Urzainqui | Spain | 2:26.21 | |
| 23 | 1 | 2 | Kotryna Teterevkova | Lithuania | 2:26.82 | |
| 24 | 1 | 3 | Melissa Rodríguez | Mexico | 2:26.87 | |
| 25 | 1 | 5 | Eszter Békési | Hungary | 2:26.89 | |
| 26 | 3 | 1 | Alina Zmushka | Belarus | 2:27.59 | |
| 27 | 1 | 7 | Eneli Jefimova | Estonia | 2:27.87 | |
| 28 | 2 | 8 | Anastasia Gorbenko | Israel | 2:28.41 | |
| 29 | 3 | 8 | Julia Sebastián | Argentina | 2:29.55 | |
| 30 | 1 | 1 | Andrea Podmaníková | Slovakia | 2:29.56 | |
| 31 | 1 | 8 | Phee Jinq En | Malaysia | 2:32.57 | |
| | 3 | 3 | Sydney Pickrem | Canada | DNS | |

=== Semifinals ===
The swimmers with the best 8 times, regardless of heat, advanced to the final.

| Rank | Heat | Lane | Swimmer | Nation | Time | Notes |
|---|---|---|---|---|---|---|
| 1 | 2 | 4 | Tatjana Schoenmaker | South Africa | 2:19.33 | Q |
| 2 | 2 | 5 | Evgenia Chikunova | ROC | 2:20.57 | Q |
| 3 | 2 | 3 | Annie Lazor | United States | 2:21.94 | Q |
| 4 | 1 | 5 | Kaylene Corbett | South Africa | 2:22.08 | Q |
| 5 | 1 | 4 | Lilly King | United States | 2:22.27 | Q |
| 6 | 2 | 8 | Abbie Wood | Great Britain | 2:22.35 | Q |
| 7 | 1 | 3 | Molly Renshaw | Great Britain | 2:22.70 | Q |
| 8 | 2 | 7 | Fanny Lecluyse | Belgium | 2:23.73 | Q |
| 9 | 2 | 2 | Jenna Strauch | Australia | 2:24.25 | |
| 10 | 1 | 7 | Sophie Hansson | Sweden | 2:24.28 | |
| 11 | 2 | 6 | Maria Temnikova | ROC | 2:24.69 | |
| 12 | 1 | 6 | Yu Jingyao | China | 2:24.76 | |
| 13 | 1 | 2 | Jessica Vall | Spain | 2:24.87 | |
| 14 | 1 | 1 | Lisa Mamié | Switzerland | 2:25.11 | |
| 15 | 2 | 1 | Francesca Fangio | Italy | 2:27.56 | |
| | 1 | 8 | Kelsey Wog | Canada | DSQ | |

=== Final ===
| Rank | Lane | Name | Nation | Time | Notes |
|---|---|---|---|---|---|
| 1st place, gold medalist(s) | 4 | Tatjana Schoenmaker | South Africa | 2:18.95 | WR |
| 2nd place, silver medalist(s) | 2 | Lilly King | United States | 2:19.92 | |
| 3rd place, bronze medalist(s) | 3 | Annie Lazor | United States | 2:20.84 | |
| 4 | 5 | Evgenia Chikunova | ROC | 2:20.88 | |
| 5 | 6 | Kaylene Corbett | South Africa | 2:22.06 | |
| 6 | 1 | Molly Renshaw | Great Britain | 2:22.65 | |
| 7 | 7 | Abbie Wood | Great Britain | 2:23.72 | |
| 8 | 8 | Fanny Lecluyse | Belgium | 2:24.57 | |
