= Swimming at the 2024 European Aquatics Championships – Women's 50 metre breaststroke =

Women's 50 metre breaststroke at the 2024 European Aquatics Championships
- Venue: Sports Centre Milan Gale Muškatirović
- Dates: 22 June (heats and semifinals); 23 June (final)
- Competitors: 27 from 17 nations
- Winning time: 30.55

Medalists
gold medal	Dominika Sztandera	Poland
silver medal	Veera Kivirinta	Finland
bronze medal	Olivia Klint Ipsa	Sweden

The Women's 50 metre breaststroke competition of the 2024 European Aquatics Championships was held on 19 and 20 June 2024.

== Records ==
Prior to the competition, the existing world, European and championship records were as follows.

	Name	Nationality	Time	Location	Date
World record	Rūta Meilutytė	Lithuania	29.16	Fukuoka	30 July 2023
European record	Rūta Meilutytė	Lithuania	29.16	Fukuoka	30 July 2023
Championship record	Benedetta Pilato	Italy	29.30	Budapest	22 May 2021

== Results ==
=== Heats ===
The heats were started on 22 June at 10:09.
Qualification Rules: The 16 fastest from the heats qualify to the semifinals.

Rank	Heat	Lane	Name	Nationality	Time	Notes
1	3	4	Veera Kivirinta	Finland	30.58	Q
2	3	5	Ana Rodrigues	Portugal	30.90	Q
3	1	5	Teya Nikolova	Bulgaria	31.17	Q
4	2	4	Ida Hulkko	Finland	31.20	Q
5	1	4	Dominika Sztandera	Poland	31.21	Q
6	3	3	Olivia Klint Ipsa	Sweden	31.23	Q
7	1	3	Maria Drasidou	Greece	31.33	Q
8	2	6	Kiia Metsäkonkola	Finland	31.46	
9	2	8	Tina Čelik	Slovenia	31.49	Q
10	1	6	Meri Mataja	Croatia	31.55	Q
11	3	7	Maria Romanjuk	Estonia	31.58	Q
12	2	3	Schastine Tabor	Denmark	31.69	Q
13	3	6	Emelie Fast	Sweden	31.70	Q
14	2	5	Silje Rongevær Slyngstadli	Norway	31.71	Q
15	3	2	Chara Angelaki	Greece	31.80	Q
16	1	7	Klara Thormalm	Sweden	31.83	
17	2	7	Tara Vovk	Slovenia	31.84	Q
18	1	1	Diana Petkova	Bulgaria	31.94	Swim-off > Q
18	3	8	Kristýna Horská	Czech Republic	31.94	Swim-off
20	1	2	Anniina Murto	Finland	32.25	
21	2	2	Andrea Podmaníková	Slovakia	32.28	
22	2	1	Niamh Coyne	Ireland	32.52	
23	1	8	Birgitta Ingólfsdóttir	Iceland	32.55	
24	3	1	Anna Munk Fuglsang	Denmark	32.70	
25	3	0	Martina Bukvić	Serbia	32.94	
26	2	0	Nikoleta Trníková	Slovakia	32.95	
27	1	0	Stella Gjoka	Albania	33.70	

=== Swim-off ===
The swim-off was held on 22 June at 10:42.
Qualification Rules: The best time advance to the semifinals.

Rank	Lane	Name	Nationality	Time	Notes
1	4	Diana Petkova	Bulgaria	31.78	Q
2	5	Kristýna Horská	Czech Republic	31.97	

=== Semifinals ===
The semifinals were started on 22 June at 19:19.
Qualification Rules: The first 2 competitors of each semifinal and the remaining fastest (up to a total of 8 qualified competitors) from the semifinals advance to the final.

Rank	Heat	Lane	Name	Nationality	Time	Notes
1	2	4	Veera Kivirinta	Finland	30.73	Q
2	2	3	Dominika Sztandera	Poland	30.86	Q
3	2	5	Teya Nikolova	Bulgaria	30.91	Q, NR
4	1	3	Olivia Klint Ipsa	Sweden	31.15	Q
5	2	7	Schastine Tabor	Denmark	31.30	Q
6	1	4	Ana Rodrigues	Portugal	31.34	Q
7	1	5	Ida Hulkko	Finland	31.36	Q
7	2	6	Maria Drasidou	Greece	31.36	Q
9	2	2	Meri Mataja	Croatia	31.39	
10	1	8	Diana Petkova	Bulgaria	31.47	
11	1	6	Tina Čelik	Slovenia	31.52	
12	2	1	Silje Rongevær Slyngstadli	Norway	31.53	
13	1	2	Maria Romanjuk	Estonia	31.56	
14	1	7	Emelie Fast	Sweden	31.74	
15	2	8	Tara Vovk	Slovenia	31.84	
15	1	1	Chara Angelaki	Greece	32.00	

=== Final ===
The final was held on 23 June at 18:35.

Rank	Lane	Name	Nationality	Time	Notes
1st place, gold medalist(s)	5	Dominika Sztandera	Poland	30.55	NR
2nd place, silver medalist(s)	4	Veera Kivirinta	Finland	30.65	
3rd place, bronze medalist(s)	6	Olivia Klint Ipsa	Sweden	30.90	
4	8	Maria Drasidou	Greece	30.95	
5	3	Teya Nikolova	Bulgaria	30.97	
6	1	Ida Hulkko	Finland	30.99	
7	7	Ana Rodrigues	Portugal	31.08	
8	2	Schastine Tabor	Denmark	31.48	
