= Mona McSharry =

Irish swimmer (born 2000)

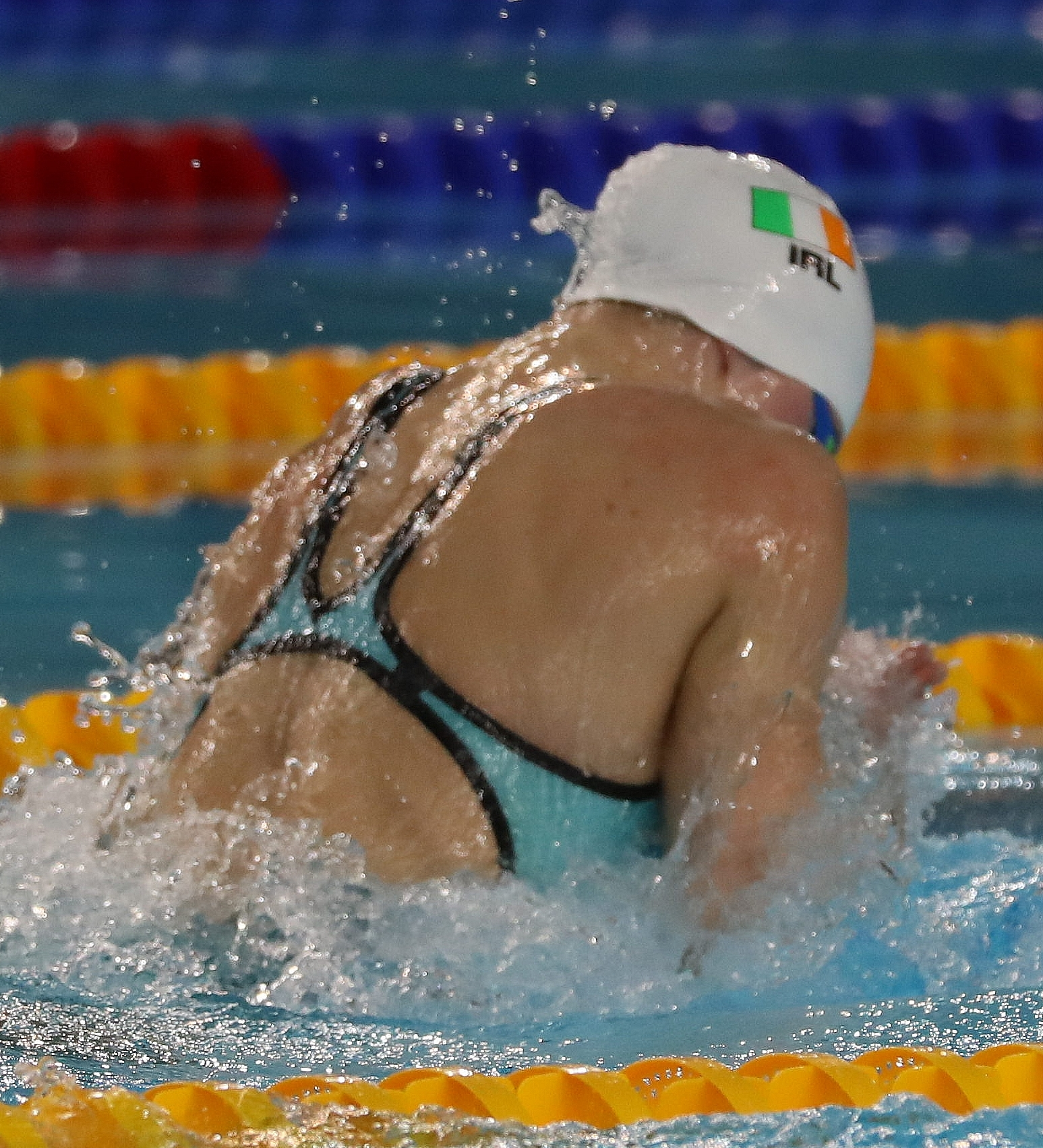
- McSharry in 2018

Personal information
- Full name: Mona Lucille McSharry
- Nationality: Irish
- Born: 21 August 2000 (age 26) Grange, County Sligo, Ireland

Sport
- Sport: Swimming
- Strokes: Breaststroke
Medal record
Women's swimming
Representing Ireland
Olympic Games
Bronze medal – third place	2024 Paris	100 m breaststroke
World Championships (SC)
Bronze medal – third place	2021 Abu Dhabi	100 m breaststroke
European Championships (LC)
Silver medal – second place	2026 Paris	100 m breaststroke
Bronze medal – third place	2026 Paris	200 m breaststroke
Bronze medal – third place	2026 Paris	50 m breaststroke
European Championships (SC)
Bronze medal – third place	2019 Glasgow	50 m breaststroke
World Junior Championships
Gold medal – first place	2017 Indianapolis	100 m breaststroke
Bronze medal – third place	2017 Indianapolis	50 m breaststroke
European Junior Championships
Gold medal – first place	2017 Netanya	50 m breaststroke
Gold medal – first place	2017 Netanya	100 m breaststroke
Silver medal – second place	2017 Netanya	200 m breaststroke
Silver medal – second place	2016 Hódmezővásárhely	100 m breaststroke
Bronze medal – third place	2016 Hódmezővásárhely	50 m breaststroke
European U-23 Championships
Gold medal – first place	2023 Dublin	50 m breaststroke
Gold medal – first place	2023 Dublin	100 m breaststroke
Gold medal – first place	2023 Dublin	200 m breaststroke

Mona Lucille McSharry (born 21 August 2000) is an Irish competitive swimmer. She is a two-time Olympian and won a bronze medal in the 100 metre breaststroke at the 2024 Summer Olympics. McSharry is also a World Championships (25m) and European Short Course Championships bronze medallist, a junior world champion and a two-time junior European champion.

McSharry is the holder of multiple national senior records, including 50 m, 100 m and 200 m breaststroke in both long course and short course, and 100 m individual medley in short course.

== Career ==
McSharry won her first international medals when she placed second in the 100 m breaststroke and third in the 50 m breaststroke at the 2016 European Junior Championships. In 2017, she won the 50 m breaststroke and 100 m breaststroke events, and placed second in the 200 breaststroke at the European Junior Championships in Netanya. In August of that year, she won the 100 m breaststroke event and finished third in the 50 m breaststroke at the World Junior Championships in Indianapolis.

McSharry won the RTÉ Young Sportsperson of the Year in 2017 becoming the inaugural winner of the award, she beat sprinter Gina Akpe-Moses and Kerry footballer David Clifford.

McSharry competed for Ireland at the 2018 Summer Youth Olympics she finished fourth in the Girls 50m Breastroke and 100m Breastroke events.

McSharry won the bronze medal in the 50 m breaststroke at the 2019 European Short Course Championships in Glasgow.

She competed at the 2020 Summer Olympics in Tokyo, finishing eight in the final 100m breaststroke in a time of 1:06.94, Qualifying for the final meant she became Ireland's first Olympic finalist in Swimming since 1996. McSharry finished 20th in the 200m breaststroke but broke a national record.

McSharry won a bronze medal in the 100 m breaststroke at the 2021 World Championships (25m).

On 29 July 2024, McSharry won a bronze medal in the 100m breaststroke at the 2024 Summer Olympics in Paris, she also finished in 11th place overall in the 100m breaststroke, by winning the medal she won Ireland's first medal at the 2024 Games and Ireland's first medal in Swimming in 28 years, McSharry was Ireland's flag bearer for the Closing Ceremony of the Paris Games Alongside Rower Fintan McCarthy.

In August 2026 she won European Championship medals at the 2026 European Aquatics Championships in Paris in all three Breaststroke events, her first a Silver in the 100m Breaststroke breaking her own national record finishing second to Britain's Angharad Evans, McSharry then won a Bronze in the 200m Breaststroke and another bronze in the 50m Breaststroke she finished in a time of 29.95 a new national record and just 0.02 of a second off Gold.

2026 World Aquatics Swimming World Cup
Gold medal – first place	Baku	100m Breaststroke
Gold medal – first place	Tashkent	100m Breaststroke
Gold medal – first place	Astana	100m Breaststroke
Silver medal – second place	Tashkent	50m Breaststroke
Silver medal – second place	Baku	200m Breaststroke
Bronze medal – third place	Tashkent	200m Breaststroke
Bronze medal – third place	Baku	50m Breaststroke
Bronze medal – third place	Astana	50m Breaststroke
Bronze medal – third place	Astana	200m Breaststroke

McSharry won $10,000 by winning Gold in the 100m Breaststroke at all three stops at the 2026 World Aquatics Swimming World Cup achieving the Triple Crown, events took place in Azerbaijan, Uzbekistan and Kazakhstan.

== Results ==
Olympic Results
Year	100m Breast	200m Breast	4 × 100m medley relay
2021	8th	—	—
2024	3rd place, bronze medalist(s)	11th	11th (h)

World Championships Results
Year	50m Breast	100m Breast	200m Breast	4 × 100 m Free Relay	4 × 100 m medley relay
2017	—	24th	—	—	—
2021 (25m)	4th	3rd place, bronze medalist(s)	7th	—	—
2023	11th	5th	15th	15th	13th
2024	8th	5th	5th	—	—
2025	25th	11th	DNS	—	—

== Personal life ==
McSharry grew up in Grange, County Sligo. In 2019, McSharry and her family competed in the seventh series of the popular RTÉ reality competition, Ireland's Fittest Family. They won the competition under the guidance of mentor, former rugby player, Donncha O'Callaghan.

== Records ==
Record	Event	Time	Meet	Date	Club
NR	50m breaststroke	30.29	Irish Championships	3 April 2023	Marlins
NR	100m breaststroke	1:05.51	Olympics Games	28 July 2024	Ireland
NR	200m breaststroke	2:22.22	Irish Open Championships	10 April 2026	Marlins
NR	4 × 100 m freestyle relay	3:41.75	World Championships	23 July 2023	Ireland
NR	4 × 100 m medley relay	4:00.12	Olympics Games	3 August 2024	Ireland
NR	50m breaststroke (SC)	29.59	World Championships	17 December 2021	Ireland
NR	100m breaststroke (SC)	1:03.92	World Championships	20 December 2021	Ireland
NR	200m breaststroke (SC)	2:20.19	World Championships	21 December 2021	Ireland
NR	100m individual medley (SC)	59.35	World Championships	18 December 2021	Ireland
NR	4 × 100 m freestyle relay (SC)	3:41.09	Irish Championships	12 December 2019	Larne
NR	4 × 200 m freestyle relay (SC)	8:07.86	Irish Championships	13 December 2019	Kilkenny
NR	4×50m medley relay (SC)	1:49.31	European Championships	8 December 2019	Ireland
NR	4×50m freestyle relay (SC)	1:31.86	European Championships	7 December 2019	Ireland
NR	4×50m medley relay (SC)	1:41.00	European Championships	5 December 2019	Ireland
