= Sophie Hansson =

Swedish swimmer (born 1998)

Personal information
- Full name: Sophie Elizabeth Hansson
- Nationality: Swedish
- Born: 2 August 1998 (age 27) Helsingborg, Sweden
- Height: 1.86 m (6 ft 1 in)
- Weight: 74 kg (163 lb)

Sport
- Sport: Swimming
- Event(s): Breaststroke, Freestyle
- Club: Helsingborgs SS
- College team: North Carolina State
- Coach: Braden Holloway (NCSU)
Medal record
Women's swimming
Representing Sweden
Event	1st	2nd	3rd
World Championships (LC)	0	1	0
World Championships (SC)	2	1	2
European Championships (LC)	2	0	0
European Championships (SC)	1	0	1
Total	5	2	3
World Championships (LC)
Silver medal – second place	2024 Doha	4×100 m medley
World Championships (SC)
Gold medal – first place	2021 Abu Dhabi	4×50 m medley
Gold medal – first place	2021 Abu Dhabi	4×100 m medley
Silver medal – second place	2021 Abu Dhabi	100 m breaststroke
Bronze medal – third place	2021 Abu Dhabi	50 m breaststroke
Bronze medal – third place	2021 Abu Dhabi	4×100 m freestyle
European Championships (LC)
Gold medal – first place	2020 Budapest	100 m breaststroke
Gold medal – first place	2022 Rome	4×100 m medley
European Championships (SC)
Gold medal – first place	2017 Copenhagen	4×50 m medley
Silver medal – second place	2025 Lublin	4×50 m medley
Bronze medal – third place	2017 Copenhagen	50 m breaststroke

Sophie Elizabeth Hansson (born 2 August 1998) is a Swedish Olympic swimmer who swam for North Carolina State University, and represented Sweden in the 2016 Rio de Janeiro, 2020 Tokyo and 2024 Paris Olympics, competing in breaststroke and relay events. In May 2021 she set a new Swedish record in the 100-meter breaststroke with a time of 1:05.69. Her older sister Louise Hansson is also a competitive swimmer and swam with her in the 2020 Tokyo Olympics.

Hansson was born 2 August 1998 in Helsingborg, Skåne, Sweden, and both she and her older sister Louise swam for the local Helsingborgs SS club, known in Sweden as Helsingborg Simsällskap. She attended Filbornaskolan High School.

In early international competition highlights, she captured the silver medal in Singapore at the 2015 Junior World Championships in both the 50 and 100 breaststroke. At the 2017 European Championships, she captured a gold medal in the 4x50 medley relay and took a bronze medal in the 50 breaststroke.

== North Carolina State University ==
Hansson was a student at North Carolina State University from 2019-2022, where she swam for Head Coach Braden Holloway. At NC State, she was an NCAA champion in 2021 in her signature events, the 100 and 200 breaststroke and the 200 and 400 medley relay.

She was an All American 22 times from 2019-2022 in the 100 and 200 breaststroke, and in the 200 and 400 medley relay. In varying years she also was an All American in the 200 and 400 freestyle relays.

She was an Atlantic Coast Conference Champion 11 times in the 100 and 200 breaststroke from 2019-2021. She was an ACC champion in varying years in the 200 and 400 medley relays, and the 200 freestyle relay.

During her career at NC State, on May 17, 2021, she broke the standing Swedish record in the 100 meter breaststroke with a time of 1:05.69, breaking her former Swedish National record which she set in the prior month.

== International competition ==
As a prolific international competitor, in five World and European Championships from 2017-2024 she won 5 gold medals, 3 silver medals, and 2 bronze medals. As a breastroke specialist she won golds in the 4x100 and 4x50 medley relays, and the 100 meter breaststroke.

== Olympics ==
=== 2016 Rio Olympics ===
Hansson competed in the women's 100 metre breaststroke event at the 2016 Summer Olympics, finishing 27th with a time of 1:08.67. Lily King took the gold medal for the U.S., with a time of 1:04.93.

She finished 26th in the women's 200 metre breaststroke with a time of 2:30.59.

=== 2020 Olympics ===
She competed in four events for Sweden in the 2020 Summer Olympics in Tokyo. Improving her times from the 2016 Olympics, she again swam in the women's 100 metre breaststroke, making the finals and placing sixth with a personal best time of 1:06.7, around 1.16 seconds from contending for a bronze medal. Lily King of the American team won the bronze with a time of 1:05.54.

In her second breaststroke event she competed in the women's 200 metre breaststroke, just missing the finals and placing tenth with a time of 2:24.28. Annie Lazor of the U.S. team took the bronze with a time of 2:20.84.

She swam in the Women's 4x100 metre freestyle relay in the final heat, placing sixth with a combined team time of 3:24.69 and finishing only five seconds behind the Women's gold medal team from Australia and less than two seconds from the bronze medal team from the United States. The Swedish team included Sarah Sjostrom, Michelle Coleman, Sophie's sister Louise Hansson, Sophie, and Sarah Junevik.

In the 4x100 Women's Medley Relay, the Swedish team again made the finals, placing fifth with a time of 3:54.27. The Australian team took gold, the American team took the silver, and the Canadian team took the bronze with a time of 3:52.60.

=== 2024 Olympics ===
At the 2024 Paris Olympics, Hannson swam in the women's 100 metre breaststroke and women's 200 metre breaststroke, and competed with the Swedish team in the 4×100 medley relay, where the Swedish team placed 7th.

In the 100-meter breaststroke, she placed 13th with a 1:06.96. In the 200-meter breaststroke, she placed 20th with a time of 2:28.10, and did not advance to the finals.

=== Honors ===
During her collegiate swimming career, she was the ACC Women's Freshman of the Year in 2019, and a Honda Sport Award Finalist in 2021. As a solid academic performer, she was part of the Academic All-Atlantic Coast Conference Team all four years from 2019-2022, and in varying years, a College Swimming and Diving Coaches Association (CSCAA) Scholar, and a CoSIDA Academic All-American.
