= Tatjana Smith =

South African swimmer (born 1997)

Personal information
- Born: Tatjana Schoenmaker; 9 July 1997 (age 29) Johannesburg, South Africa
- Height: 178 cm (5 ft 10 in)
- Weight: 63 kg (139 lb)
- Relative: Siya Kolisi (former brother-in-law)

Sport
- Sport: Swimming
- Strokes: Breaststroke
Medal record
Women's swimming
Representing South Africa
Olympic Games
Gold medal – first place	2020 Tokyo	200 m breaststroke
Gold medal – first place	2024 Paris	100 m breaststroke
Silver medal – second place	2020 Tokyo	100 m breaststroke
Silver medal – second place	2024 Paris	200 m breaststroke
World Championships (LC)
Gold medal – first place	2023 Fukuoka	200 m breaststroke
Silver medal – second place	2019 Gwangju	200 m breaststroke
Silver medal – second place	2023 Fukuoka	100 m breaststroke
Commonwealth Games
Gold medal – first place	2018 Gold Coast	100 m breaststroke
Gold medal – first place	2018 Gold Coast	200 m breaststroke
Gold medal – first place	2022 Birmingham	200 m breaststroke
Silver medal – second place	2022 Birmingham	100 m breaststroke
African Games
Gold medal – first place	2015 Brazzaville	50 m breaststroke
Gold medal – first place	2015 Brazzaville	100 m breaststroke
Gold medal – first place	2015 Brazzaville	200 m breaststroke
Summer Universiade
Gold medal – first place	2019 Naples	100 m breaststroke
Gold medal – first place	2019 Naples	200 m breaststroke
Silver medal – second place	2017 Taipei	200 m breaststroke
African Youth Games
Gold medal – first place	2014 Gaborone	50 m breaststroke
Gold medal – first place	2014 Gaborone	100 m breaststroke
African Junior Championships
Gold medal – first place	2013 Lusaka	50 m breaststroke
Gold medal – first place	2013 Lusaka	100 m breaststroke
Gold medal – first place	2013 Lusaka	200 m breaststroke
Gold medal – first place	2013 Lusaka	4×100 m freestyle
Gold medal – first place	2013 Lusaka	4×200 m freestyle
Gold medal – first place	2013 Lusaka	4×100 m medley

Tatjana Smith (née Schoenmaker; born 9 July 1997) is a Dutch swimmer who specialised in breaststroke events. She is a two-time Olympic champion and the most decorated South African Olympian in history. Smith won the gold medal in the 200-metre breaststroke and the silver medal in the 100-metre breaststroke at the 2020 Olympic Games, setting Olympic records in both events and the world record in the former, and the gold medal in the 100-metre breaststroke and the silver medal in the 200-metre breaststroke at the 2024 Olympic Games. She is also a World Championships gold medalist (2023) and two-time silver medalist (2019, 2023). Due to controversy with swimming South Africa, as well as Swimming South Africa alleged corruption related issues, during November 2026, she announced she now represents the Dutch national swimming team.

Smith is the former world record holder in the long course 200-metre breaststroke and is the African record holder in the long course and short course 100-metre breaststroke, as well as the short course 200-metre breaststroke.

== Career ==
=== 2018 Commonwealth Games ===
Smith competed at the 2018 Commonwealth Games, winning gold medals in women's 100-metre breaststroke (1:06.41) and the women's 200-metre breaststroke (2:22.02).

=== 2021 ===
Leading up to the 2021 South Africa National Swimming Championships, Smith set a new South African record in the 100-metre breaststroke with a time of 1:05.89 at a South African Time Trials competition in Stellenbosch in February. On day one of the 2021 South Africa National Swimming Championships, 7 April in Gqeberha, she won the national title in the 50-metre breaststroke with a South African record time of 30.32, which was 0.10 seconds faster than the South African record time of 30.42 she set in the preliminaries and 0.10 seconds faster than the record prior to that, which she set in December 2020. On the third day of competition, she won the 200-metre breaststroke national title with a South African record time of 2:20.17. The fourth and final day, she won a third national title in an individual breaststroke event, this time finishing first in the final of the 100-metre breaststroke with a South African record time of 1:05.74, which was 1.66 seconds faster than silver medalist Lara van Niekerk. Her times in the 100-metre and 200-metre breaststroke, qualified her to represent South Africa at the 2020 Summer Olympics.

==== 2020 Summer Olympics ====
2020 Summer Olympics
Gold medal – first place	200 m breaststroke	2:18.95 (WR)
Silver medal – second place	100 m breaststroke	1:05.22

Smith entered the delayed 2020 Summer Olympics in Tokyo, Japan as the number one seed and predicted winner of the 200-metre breaststroke. She also entered the 100-metre breaststroke as the number four seed.

In the prelims of the 100-metre breaststroke, Smith ranked first out of all heats, advanced to the semifinals, and set a new Olympic record and a new African record in the event with her time of 1:04.82. The Olympic record she broke was a time of 1:04.93 set at the 2016 Summer Olympics by American Lilly King. Her time of 30.21 seconds for the first 50-metre portion of the event set new African and South African records in the 50-metre breaststroke. In the semifinals, Smith swam the fastest time of 1:05.07 and ranked first heading into the final. In the final, Smith won the silver medal with a time of 1:05.22, which was the first medal for a South African woman in swimming at an Olympic Games since 2000.

In the prelims heats of the 200-metre breaststroke on day five of competition, Smith swam a 2:19.16, setting a new Olympic record, advancing to the semifinals ranked first overall and swimming less than a tenth of a second slower than the world record of 2:19.11 set by Rikke Pedersen. In the event's semifinals, Smith swam a 2:19.33 and ranked first, heading into the final. In the final, Smith set a new world record in the 200-metre breaststroke with her time of 2:18.95 and won the gold medal. Her world record was the first individual world record set in the sport of swimming at the 2020 Olympic Games. Her gold medal was the first gold medal won by an athlete from South Africa at the 2020 Summer Olympics and the first gold medal in an individual swimming event at an Olympic Games by a female South African since Penny Heyns at the 1996 Summer Olympics. Her teammate, Kaylene Corbett, also reached the finals, making it the first time since Sydney 2000 that two South African women reached the finals of the same event.

=== 2022 ===
At the 2022 South Africa National Swimming Championships, Smith won the silver medal in the 50-metre breaststroke, placing second less than three-tenths of a second behind Lara van Niekerk with a time of 30.87 seconds and achieving a qualifying time for the 2022 World Aquatics Championships and 2022 Commonwealth Games in the event. She won the gold medal in the 200-metre breaststroke on day three with a time of 2:24.01. In her third event, she swam a 1:06.06 to win the silver medal in the 100-metre breaststroke, which also marked the third event she qualified in for the World Championships and Commonwealth Games. In June, she was named as one of twelve women on the South Africa swim team for the 2022 Commonwealth Games.

==== 2022 Commonwealth Games ====
2022 Commonwealth Games
Gold medal – first place	200 m breaststroke	2:21.92
Silver medal – second place	100 m breaststroke	1:06.68

For the preliminaries of the 50-metre breaststroke, on day one, in swimming at the 2022 Commonwealth Games, Smith swam a 30.76 and qualified for the semifinals ranking fourth. She qualified for the final the following day with a time of 30.94 seconds in the semifinals. In the final, she finished in 30.41 seconds and placed fourth. The next morning, she ranked first in the preliminaries of the 200-metre breaststroke by over three full seconds with her time of 2:21.76, qualifying for the evening final. She won the gold medal in the final, swimming 1.20 seconds slower than the Games record of 2:20.72 set by Leisel Jones of Australia in 2006 with her time of 2:21.92. It was the third gold medal for South Africa at the 2022 Commonwealth Games across all sports. On the fourth morning, she ranked second in the preliminaries of the 100-metre breaststroke with a 1:07.10 and qualified for the semifinals. She ranked second behind Lara van Niekerk again in the semifinals, finishing in a time of 1:06.43 to qualify for the final. In the final, she won the silver medal with a time of 1:06.68.

=== 2023 ===
On the first day of the 2023 South Africa National Swimming Championships in April, Smith won the national title in the 100-metre breaststroke with a 2023 World Aquatics Championships qualifying time of 1:05.89 as well as a national title in the 4×200-metre freestyle relay, swimming the second leg of the relay to contribute to a final mark of 7:13.91. She won the national title in the 200-metre breaststroke two days later with a World Championships qualifying time of 2:22.44, finishing 2.96 seconds ahead of the second-place finisher. She won the silver medal in the 50-metre breaststroke on day four less than one second behind the gold medalist with a World Championships qualifying time of 30.71 seconds. The final day she withdrew from further competition in the 400-metre freestyle after swimming a 4:25.27 in the morning preliminary heats.

=== 2024 Summer Olympics ===
Smith won gold in the 100-metre breaststroke and silver in the 200-metre breaststroke at the Paris Olympics, becoming the most decorated South African Olympian in history in the process, in addition to being one of the flag-bearers for South Africa at the closing ceremony. She announced her retirement from competitive swimming after her last race at the Games.

2024 Summer Olympics
Gold medal – first place	100 m breaststroke	1:05.00
Silver medal – second place	200 m breaststroke	2:19.60

Representing the Netherlands

Smith confirmed that she will be representing the Netherlands for the next chapter of her career due to her Dutch father. She announced it via an Instagram post on 10 November 2026. She stated “representing South Africa was a childhood dream come true, and it’s a chapter [she] will always look back on with immense pride and gratitude”. This came following a dispute with Swimming South Africa over her prize money.

== International championships (50 m) ==
Meet	400 freestyle	50 breaststroke	100 breaststroke	200 breaststroke	200 medley	4×100 freestyle	4×200 freestyle	4×100 medley	4×100 mixed medley
Junior level
AJC 2013	6th	1st place, gold medalist(s)	1st place, gold medalist(s)	1st place, gold medalist(s)		1st place, gold medalist(s)	1st place, gold medalist(s)	1st place, gold medalist(s)	—N/a
AYG 2014		1st place, gold medalist(s)	1st place, gold medalist(s)						—N/a
Senior level
AG 2015		1st place, gold medalist(s)	1st place, gold medalist(s)	1st place, gold medalist(s)					
WUG 2017		12th	4th	2nd place, silver medalist(s)	30th				—N/a
CG 2018		4th	1st place, gold medalist(s)	1st place, gold medalist(s)					—N/a
WUG 2019		4th	1st place, gold medalist(s)	1st place, gold medalist(s)					
WC 2019		17th	6th	2nd place, silver medalist(s)				17th	15th
OG 2020		—N/a	2nd place, silver medalist(s)	1st place, gold medalist(s)				14th	
CG 2022		4th	2nd place, silver medalist(s)	1st place, gold medalist(s)					
WC 2023		WD^{[a]}	2nd place, silver medalist(s)	1st place, gold medalist(s)					
OG 2024		—N/a	1st place, gold medalist(s)	2nd place, silver medalist(s)					

^{a} Schoenmaker placed 14th in the preliminary heats but chose to withdraw from the semifinal.

== International championships (25 m) ==
Meet	50 breaststroke	100 breaststroke	200 breaststroke	200 medley	4×50 medley	4×100 medley
WC 2014	37th	35th	29th	40th	10th	13th

== Personal best times ==
=== Long course metres (50 m pool) ===
Event	Time		Meet	Location	Date	Notes	Ref
50 m breaststroke	30.21	†, h	2020 Summer Olympics	Tokyo, Japan	25 July 2021		
100 m breaststroke	1:04.82	h	2020 Summer Olympics	Tokyo, Japan	25 July 2021	OR, AF	
200 m breaststroke	2:18.95		2020 Summer Olympics	Tokyo, Japan	30 July 2021	OR, AF	

Legend: WR – World record; AF – African record; NR – South African record; e – equalled existing record; OR – Olympic record;
Records not set in finals: h – heat; sf – semifinal; r – relay 1st leg; rh – relay heat 1st leg; b – B final; † – en route to final mark; so – swim-off; tt – time trial

=== Short course metres (25 m pool) ===
Event	Time	Meet	Location	Date	Notes	Ref
50 m breaststroke	30.20	2020 South Africa Short Course Championships	Pietermaritzburg	26 October 2020	Former NR	
100 m breaststroke	1:03.89	2020 South Africa Short Course Championships	Pietermaritzburg	25 October 2020	AF, NR	
200 m breaststroke	2:18.02	2020 South Africa Short Course Championships	Pietermaritzburg	26 October 2020	AF, NR	

Legend: AF – African record; NR – South African record; e – equalled existing record;
Records not set in finals: h – heat; sf – semifinal; r – relay 1st leg; rh – relay heat 1st leg; b – B final; † – en route to final mark; so – swim-off; tt – time trial

== World records ==
=== Long course metres (50 m pool) ===
No.	Event	Time	Meet	Location	Date	Ref
1	200 m breaststroke	2:18.95	2020 Summer Olympics	Tokyo, Japan	30 July 2021	

== Awards ==
- 2018 Swammy Award: African Female Swimmer of the Year.
- 2019 SA Sports Awards: Sports Star of the Year, Sportswoman of the Year.
- 2019 Swammy Award: African Female Swimmer of the Year.
- 2020 Swammy Award: African Female Swimmer of the Year.
- SwimSwam Top 100 (Women's): 2021 (#50), 2022 (#6).
- FINA, Top 10 Moments: 2020 Summer Olympics (#4 for world record and becoming the first woman to swim the 200 metre breaststroke in less than 2:19.00).
- 2021 Swimming World: African Female Swimmer of the Year award.
- 2021 SA Sports Awards: Sports Star of the Year, Sportswoman of the Year.
- 2022 Forbes Woman Africa Sports Award.
- Sportswoman of the Year 2025

== Personal life ==
In February 2023, Smith confirmed her relationship with Joel Smith. They were married in Robertson, Western Cape on November 4, 2023.

== See also ==
- World record progression 200 metres breaststroke
- List of African records in swimming

Records
Preceded by (Denmark) Rikke Møller Pedersen	World Record Holder; Women's 200 Breaststroke; 30 July 2021 – 21 April 2023	Succeeded by (Russia) Evgeniia Chikunova
