= Evgeniia Chikunova =

Russian swimmer (born 2004)

Personal information
- Nationality: Russian
- Born: 17 November 2004 (age 21) St. Petersburg, Russia

Sport
- Sport: Swimming
Medal record
Women's swimming
Representing Neutral Athletes B
World Championships (LC)
Silver medal – second place	2025 Singapore	200 m breaststroke
World Championships (SC)
Silver medal – second place	2024 Budapest	200 m breaststroke
European Championships (LC)
Gold medal – first place	2026 Paris	200 m breaststroke
Bronze medal – third place	2026 Paris	4×100 m medley
Representing Russian Swimming Federation
World Championships (SC)
Silver medal – second place	2021 Abu Dhabi	200 m breaststroke
Representing Russia
European Championships (LC)
Silver medal – second place	2020 Budapest	4×100 m medley
European Championships (SC)
Gold medal – first place	2021 Kazan	200 m breaststroke
Silver medal – second place	2021 Kazan	100 m breaststroke
World Junior Championships
Gold medal – first place	2019 Budapest	100 m breaststroke
Gold medal – first place	2019 Budapest	200 m breaststroke
Silver medal – second place	2019 Budapest	4×100 m medley

Evgeniia Igorevna Chikunova (Russian: Евгения Игоревна Чикунова; born 17 November 2004) is a Russian swimmer. She competed in the women's 100 metre breaststroke, 200 metre breaststroke, and 4 × 100 metre medley relay at the 2020 Summer Olympics. Trains under the guidance of Honored Coach of Russia Vitta Novozhilova.

In 2019 she broke the junior world record for the 200 metre breaststroke (short course) with a time of 2:17.71 and broke her own record twice in 2021 with a time of 2:17.57 and then 2:16.88.

On 19 April 2023, at the year's Russian National Championships conducted in long course metres at the Palace of Water Sports in Kazan, Chikunova won the gold medal in the 100 metre breaststroke with a personal best time of 1:04.92, which was a world-leading time for the 2023 year (fastest time by a female swimmer in-competition in the 2023 year up through the time of the swim). In the final of the 200 metre breaststroke two days later, she won the gold medal with a personal best time of 2:17.55, which was 1.40 seconds faster than the world record in the event.

Records
Preceded by Tatjana Schoenmaker	World Record Holder; Women's 200 Breaststroke; 21 April 2023 – present	Succeeded by Incumbent
