= Angharad Evans =

British swimmer

Personal information
- Nationality: British
- Born: 25 April 2003 (age 23) Cambridge, England

Sport
- Sport: Swimming
- Event: Breaststroke
- University team: University of Stirling
- Coach: Ben Higson/Brad Hay
Medal record
Women's swimming
Representing Great Britain
World Championships (SC)
Silver medal – second place	2024 Budapest	4×100 m medley
European Championships (LC)
Gold medal – first place	2026 Paris	100 m breaststroke
Gold medal – first place	2026 Paris	4×100 m medley
Silver medal – second place	2026 Paris	200 m breaststroke
European Championships (SC)
Silver medal – second place	2025 Lublin	200 m breaststroke
Representing Scotland
Commonwealth Games
Gold medal – first place	2026 Glasgow	100 m breaststroke
Gold medal – first place	2026 Glasgow	200 m breaststroke
Silver medal – second place	2026 Glasgow	4 x 100 m medley
Bronze medal – third place	2026 Glasgow	mixed 4 x 100 m medley

Angharad Evans (born 25 April 2003) is a British swimmer specialising in the breaststroke. Born in England, she represented Scotland at the 2026 Commonwealth Games, and competed for Great Britain at the 2024 Summer Olympics, the 2025 World Aquatics Championships and the 2026 European Aquatics Championships.

Evans is a double Commonwealth Games champion and double European champion from 2026, and a five-time national champion between 2024 and 2026. In August 2026, Evans swam the fastest female breaststroke relay leg in history, 1:03.75 in helping Great Britain win gold in the final of the Women's 4 x 100 metre medley relay at the 2026 European Aquatics Championships.

== Early life ==
Evans was born in Cambridge, England, with an American mother and British father. Her Welsh name reflects her Welsh-speaking paternal grandparents. She resides in Scotland, and opted to represent Scotland internationally.

== Career ==
Evans studied at the University of Georgia in the United States and then the University of Stirling in Scotland.

In April 2024, she won the 100 metres breaststroke title at the 2024 Aquatics GB Swimming Championships, setting a time of 1:06.54 and was subsequently named in the British team for the 2024 Summer Olympics. In May 2024, she set a new British record of 1:05.54 on her way to winning the 100 metres breaststroke competition at the AP Race International meeting in London.

In her international debut at the Paris Olympics, she reached the 100 metres breaststroke final, turning at 50 metres in third place and finishing the race in sixth place with a time of 1:05.85.

Evans won the 200 metres breaststroke title at the 2025 Aquatics GB Swimming Championships, which sealed a qualification place for the 2025 World Aquatics Championships in Singapore. She also retained her 100 metres title in a national record time of 1:05.37. Subsequently at the World Championships, she reached the final of the 200 metres breaststroke.

At the Aquatics GB Champs in April 2026, she retained her titles, posting British record times of 2:19.70 in the 200 and 1:04.96 in the 100 metres.

At the 2026 Commonwealth Games, Evans won the gold medal in the 100 metres breaststroke, winning Scotland's 4th gold medal of the games.. She also won gold in the 200 metres breaststroke, silver in the 4 x 100m medley, and bronze in the mixed 4 x 100m medley.
