= Ellie McCartney =

Swimmer (born 2005)

Personal information
- Born: April 13, 2005 (age 21) Enniskillen, Northern Ireland

Sport
- Sport: Swimming
- Strokes: Medley, breaststroke
Medal record
Representing Ireland
European Junior Championships
Bronze medal – third place	2023 Belgrade	200m individual medley
European U-23 Championships
Gold medal – first place	2025 Samorin	200 m Medley
Silver medal – second place	2025 Samorin	200 m Breastorke
Bronze medal – third place	2025 Samorin	100 m Breastorke
Representing Northern Ireland
Commonwealth Youth Games
Gold medal – first place	2023 Trinbago	200m breaststroke
Gold medal – first place	2023 Trinbago	200m individual medley
Bronze medal – third place	2023 Trinbago	100m breaststroke

Ellie McCartney is an international swimmer for Ireland, and Northern Ireland in the Commonwealth Games. She competed at the 2023 Commonwealth Youth Games in Trinidad and Tobago in the 100 and 200 metre breaststroke, and 200 metre Individual medley, where she won two gold and a bronze medal, making her double Commonwealth Youth Games champion. That same summer she represented Ireland in the European Junior Swimming Championships where she finished in third place in a personal best time of 2:14.31. In December 2023, she competed in the European Short Course Championships in Romania, making the 200 meter Individual Medley final alongside her teammate Ellen Walshe.

== Championship Results ==
World Championships
Year	200m IM	200m Breast
2024 (25m)	—	17th
2025	25th	7th

European Championships
Year	200m IM	100m Breast	200m Breast
2022	24th	34th	25th
2023 (25m)	8th	26th	DSQ
2024	8th	19th	8th
