= Alina Zmushka =

Belarusian swimmer (born 1997)

Alina Zmushko
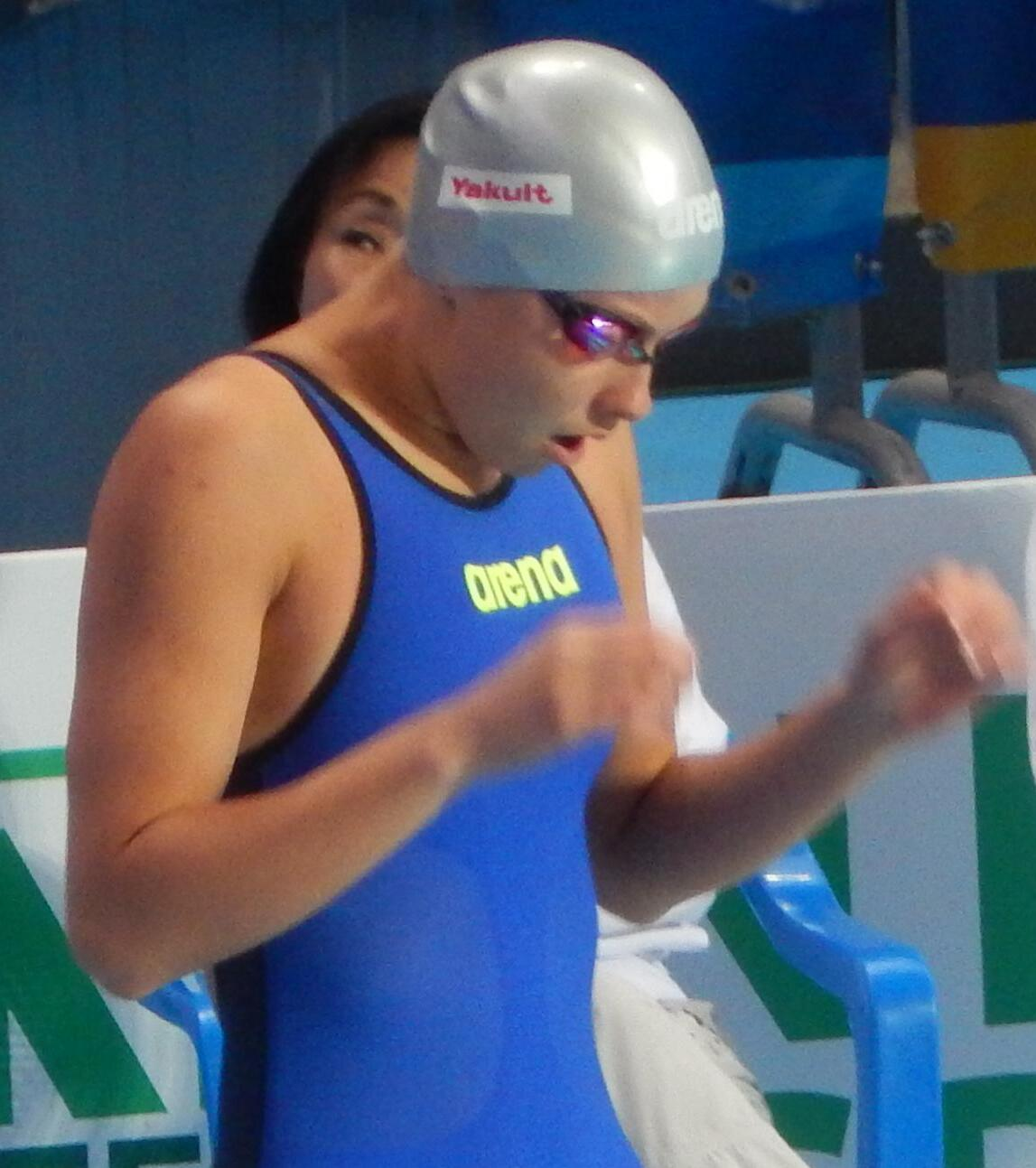
- Zmushko in 2015

Personal information
- Nationality: Belarusian
- Born: 5 January 1997 (age 29) Kalinkavichy, Belarus
- Height: 178 cm (5 ft 10 in)

Sport
- Country: Belarus
- Sport: Swimming
Medal record
Representing Neutral Athletes A
World Championships (LC)
Bronze medal – third place	2025 Singapore	200 m breaststroke

Alina Igorevna Zmushko (Belarusian: Аліна Ігараўна Змушко; born 5 January 1997) is a Belarusian swimmer. She is the 2025 World bronze medalist in the 200 metre breaststroke. She represented Belarus at the 2020 Summer Olympics and competed at the 2024 Summer Olympics as an Individual Neutral Athlete.

== Career ==
At the 2019 Belarus Championships, Zmushko broke her own national record in the 100 metre breaststroke to win the event. She also broke Inna Kapishina national record from 2007 in the 200 metre breaststroke. She competed in the 100 metre breaststroke at the 2019 World Aquatics Championships and finished 15th in the semifinals. She also competed in the 50 metre breaststroke and finished ninth in the semifinals.

Zmushko broke her own national record in the 200 metre breaststroke at the 2020 Belarus Championships. She qualified to represent Belarus at the 2020 Summer Olympics in the 100 and 200 metre breaststroke events. She finished 21st in the 100 metre breaststroke heats and 26th in the 200 metre breaststroke heats. Additionally, she comepetd with the 4 × 100 metre medley relay that placed 12th in the heats.

Zmushko was one of four swimmers to be approved by the International Olympic Committee to compete as an Individual Neutral Athlete at the 2024 Summer Olympics. She competed in the 100 metre breaststroke and advanced to the final in fifth place and set a new national record. She ultimately finished eighth in the final. She also competed in the 200 metre breaststroke but did not advance beyond the heats.

Zmushko competed as a Neutral Athlete at the 2025 World Aquatics Championships. She tied with South Africa's Kaylene Corbett for the bronze medal in the 200 metre breaststroke. She also finished seventh in the 100 metre breaststroke final.
