= Eneli Jefimova =

Estonian swimmer (born 2006)

Personal information
- Nationality: Estonian
- Born: 27 December 2006 (age 19)

Sport
- Sport: Swimming
- Strokes: Breaststroke
Medal record
Women's swimming
Representing Estonia
Senior level
Event	1st	2nd	3rd
Olympic Games	0	0	0
World Championships (LC)	0	0	0
World Championships (SC)	0	0	1
European Championships (LC)	1	0	0
European Championships (SC)	3	2	0
Total	4	2	1
Junior / U-23 level
Event	1st	2nd	3rd
World Junior Championships	1	1	1
European Junior Championships	7	2	1
European U-23 Championships	2	0	0
Total	10	3	2
Senior level
World Championships (SC)
Bronze medal – third place	2024 Budapest	100 m breaststroke
European Championships (LC)
Gold medal – first place	2024 Belgrade	100 m breaststroke
European Championships (SC)
Gold medal – first place	2025 Lublin	50 m breaststroke
Gold medal – first place	2025 Lublin	100 m breaststroke
Gold medal – first place	2023 Otopeni	100 m breaststroke
Silver medal – second place	2023 Otopeni	50 m breaststroke
Silver medal – second place	2021 Kazan	100 m breaststroke
Junior / U-23 level
World Junior Championships
Gold medal – first place	2023 Netanya	50 m breaststroke
Silver medal – second place	2023 Netanya	100 m breaststroke
Bronze medal – third place	2023 Netanya	200 m breaststroke
European Junior Championships
Gold medal – first place	2021 Rome	100 m breaststroke
Gold medal – first place	2022 Bucharest	50 m breaststroke
Gold medal – first place	2022 Bucharest	100 m breaststroke
Gold medal – first place	2022 Bucharest	200 m breaststroke
Gold medal – first place	2023 Belgrade	50 m breaststroke
Gold medal – first place	2023 Belgrade	100 m breaststroke
Gold medal – first place	2024 Vilnius	100 m breaststroke
Silver medal – second place	2021 Rome	200 m breaststroke
Silver medal – second place	2023 Belgrade	200 m breaststroke
Bronze medal – third place	2021 Rome	50 m breaststroke
European U-23 Championships
Gold medal – first place	2025 Šamorín	50 m breaststroke
Gold medal – first place	2025 Šamorín	100 m breaststroke

Eneli Jefimova (born 27 December 2006) is an Estonian swimmer. She competed in the women's 100 metre breaststroke event at the 2020 European Aquatics Championships, in Budapest, Hungary. In July 2021, she won the gold medal in the 100m breaststroke event at the European Junior Swimming Championships in Rome, Italy. She won a silver medal in the 100 m breaststroke event at the 2021 European Short Course Swimming Championships in Kazan, Russia.

She made her Olympic debut at the 2020 Olympics at the age of 14, where reached semi-finals in 100 metre breaststroke (16th) and finished 27th in 200 metre breaststroke.

== International championships (50 m) ==
Meet	50 breaststroke	100 breaststroke	200 breaststroke	200 medley	50 freestyle	4×100 medley	4×100 mixed medley
Junior / U-23 level
EJC 2021	3rd place, bronze medalist(s)	1st place, gold medalist(s)	2nd place, silver medalist(s)			10th	14th
EJC 2022	1st place, gold medalist(s)	1st place, gold medalist(s)	1st place, gold medalist(s)				6th
EJC 2023	1st place, gold medalist(s)	1st place, gold medalist(s)	2nd place, silver medalist(s)	38th			6th
WJC 2023	1st place, gold medalist(s)	2nd place, silver medalist(s)	3rd place, bronze medalist(s)				
EJC 2024		1st place, gold medalist(s)					
EUC 2025	1st place, gold medalist(s)	1st place, gold medalist(s)	10th				
Senior level
EC 2021	12th	8th	24th		56th		16th
OG 2020	—N/a	16th	27th				
WC 2022	6th	9th	19th				DSQ
WC 2023	8th	6th	21st				19th
EC 2024		1st place, gold medalist(s)	17th				
OG 2024	—N/a	7th	23rd				
WC 2025	6th	10th					
EC 2026	4th	4th	18th				

== International championships (25 m) ==
Meet	50 breaststroke	100 breaststroke	200 breaststroke	4×50 medley	4×50 mixed medley
EC 2021	9th	2nd place, silver medalist(s)	19th		15th
WC 2021	20th	13th	22nd		12th
EC 2023	2nd place, silver medalist(s)	1st place, gold medalist(s)	7th	9th	6th
WC 2024	5th	3rd place, bronze medalist(s)			15th
EC 2025	1st place, gold medalist(s)	1st place, gold medalist(s)	10th		8th

Awards
Preceded by Kelly Sildaru	Estonian Athlete of the Year; 2023–2024	Succeeded by incumbent
Preceded by Kelly Sildaru; Karmen Bruus	Estonian Young Athlete of the Year; 2021; 2023–2024	Succeeded by Karmen Bruus incumbent
