= Anna Elendt =

German swimmer (born 2001)

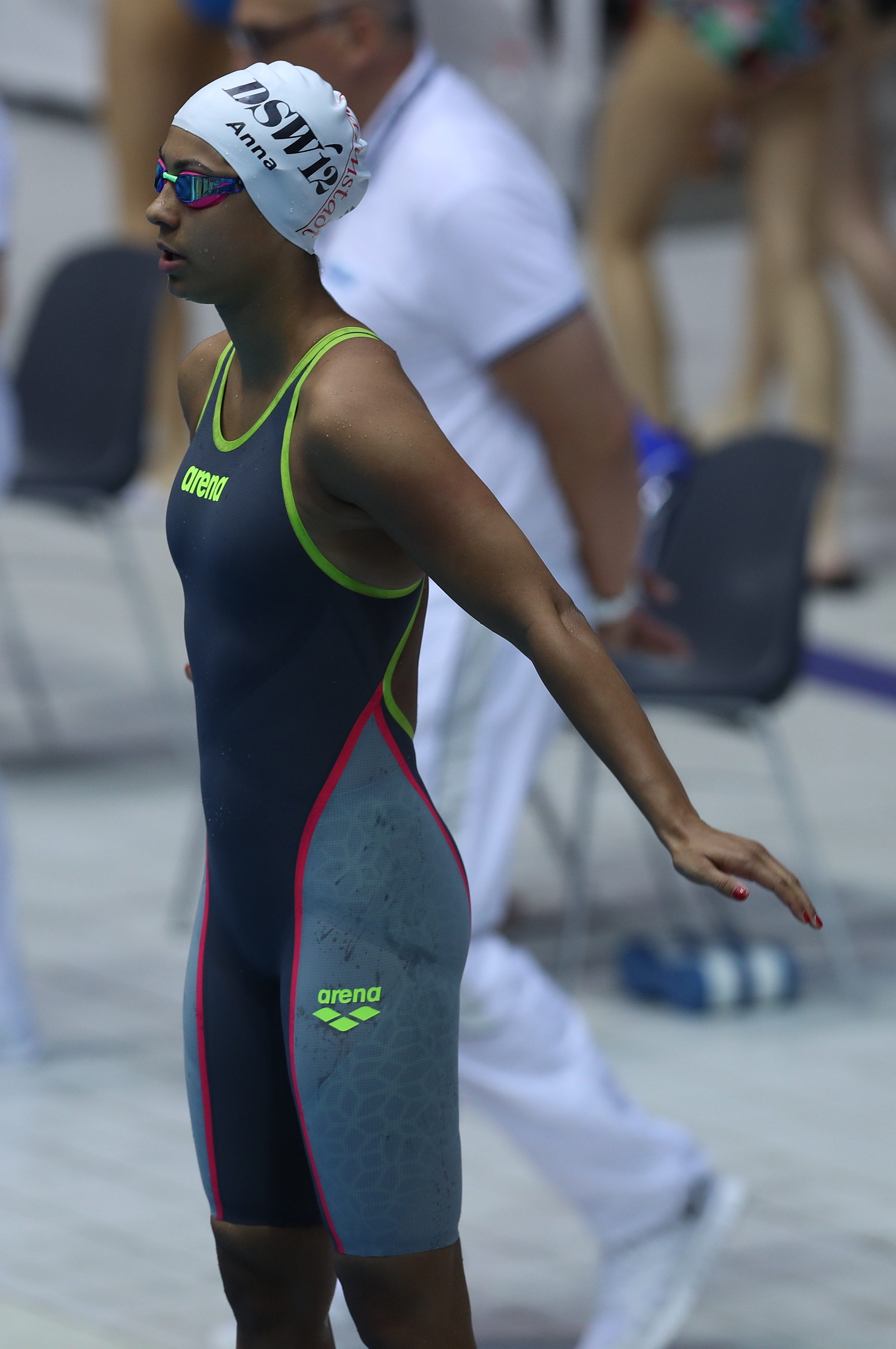
- Anna Elendt in 2018

Personal information
- Full name: Anna Charlott Darcel Elendt
- National team: Germany
- Born: 4 September 2001 (age 25) Dreieich, Germany
- Height: 175 cm (5 ft 9 in)
- Weight: 64 kg (141 lb)

Sport
- Sport: Swimming
- Strokes: Breaststroke
- College team: University of Texas at Austin
Medal record
Women's swimming
Representing Germany
Event	1st	2nd	3rd
World Championships (LC)	1	1	0
World Championships (SC)	0	0	1
European Junior Championships	0	1	2
Total	1	2	3
World Championships (LC)
Gold medal – first place	2025 Singapore	100 m breaststroke
Silver medal – second place	2022 Budapest	100 m breaststroke
World Championships (SC)
Bronze medal – third place	2022 Melbourne	100 m breaststroke
European Championships (SC)
Gold medal – first place	2025 Lublin	200 m breaststroke
European Junior Championships
Silver medal – second place	2018 Helsinki	50 m breaststroke
Bronze medal – third place	2018 Helsinki	100 m breaststroke
Bronze medal – third place	2018 Helsinki	4×100 m medley

Anna Charlott Darcel Elendt (born 4 September 2001) is a German swimmer. She competed in the women's 50 metre breaststroke and women's 100 metre breaststroke at the 2019 World Aquatics Championships. She holds the National Record in the 100m breaststroke, with a time of 1:06.50, which she achieved at the German Swimming Championships on 4 June 2021 in Berlin.

== Early life and education ==
Elendt was born 4 September 2001 and calls Dreieich, Germany her hometown. She is one of three children of parents Melanie and Philipp Elendt.

She attended Carl von Weinberg Schule for high school. Collegiately, Elendt decided to live and train in the United States, and began competing for the University of Texas swim team in the autumn of 2020.

== Career ==
=== 2018 European Junior Championships ===
At the 2018 European Junior Championships in Helsinki, Finland in July 2018, Elendt won three medals. She won a silver medal in the 50 metre breaststroke, a bronze medal in the 100 metre breaststroke, and a bronze medal in the 4x100 metre medley relay.

=== 2019 World Championships ===
In July 2019 at the World Aquatics Championships in Gwangju, South Korea, Elendt competed in two individual events and the 4x100 meter relay. She ranked 7th in the final of the 50 metre breaststroke with a time of 31.06. In the 100 metre breaststroke she swam a 1:08.70 and tied for 24th place in the prelims. On the 4x100 metre medley relay, Elendt swam a 1:08.74 on the breaststroke leg of the relay. The relay ranked 9th overall.

=== 2020 ===
At the 2020 Toyota US Open Championships, Elendt won the 100 metre breaststroke ahead of second-place finisher Lydia Jacoby with a time of 1:07.50. Elendt earned the "Big 12 Swimming & Diving Newcomer of the Week" award for the week of December 1 following her performance at the US Open.

==== 2020 Summer Olympics ====
Elendt qualified to compete at the 2020 Summer Olympics in Tokyo, Japan, in the 100 metre breaststroke as part of Germany's 2020 Olympic team. She was also one of the swimmers on the 4x100 metre medley relay at the 2019 World Championships that qualified the relay for the 2020 Olympics.

=== 2021 ===
During Elendt's first collegiate season for the Texas Longhorns, she received the "Big 12 Swimming & Diving Newcomer of the Week” award for the week of February 24 from the Big 12 Conference. The award recognized her accomplishment of winning the 100 yard breaststroke with a time of 1:00.56 and the 200 yard breaststroke with a time of 2:12.94 in the last dual meet of the season.

==== 2021 German National Championships ====
On 4 June 2021, at the German National Swimming Championships, Elendt set a new national record in the 100 metre breaststroke with a time of 1:06.50 and was the first female German athlete to swim faster than 1:07 in the event. The next day, she broke the national record of Germany in the 50 metre breaststroke with her time of 30.67.

On 25 July 2021, Elendt competed in the 100 metre breaststroke prelims, swimming a 1:06.96, ranking 16th for all prelims heats, and advancing to the semifinals.

=== 2025 ===
On July 30, 2025, Elendt won a gold medal and the World championship in Singapore, finishing the 100 breast stroke in 1:05.19 minutes.
