= Dominika Sztandera =

Polish swimmer (born 1997)

Personal information
- Born: 19 January 1997 (age 29)

Sport
- Sport: Swimming
Medal record
Women's swimming
Representing Poland
European Championships (LC)
Gold medal – first place	2024 Belgrade	50 m breaststroke
Gold medal – first place	2024 Belgrade	4×100 m medley relay
European Championships (SC)
Gold medal – first place	2019 Glasgow	4×50 m medley relay
Bronze medal – third place	2021 Kazan	4x50 m freestyle relay
World University Games
Silver medal – second place	2021 Chengdu	50 m breaststroke
Silver medal – second place	2021 Chengdu	4×100 m medley
Silver medal – second place	2021 Chengdu	4×100 m mixed medley
Bronze medal – third place	2021 Chengdu	100 m breaststroke

Dominika Anna Sztandera (born 19 January 1997) is a Polish swimmer. She competed in the women's 100 metre breaststroke event at the 2017 World Aquatics Championships. In 2014, she represented Poland at the 2014 Summer Youth Olympics held in Nanjing, China.
