= Clara Rybak-Andersen =

Danish swimmer (born 2003)

Personal information
- Nationality: Danish
- Born: 18 December 2003 (age 22)

Sport
- Sport: Swimming
Medal record
Women's swimming
Representing Denmark
European Championships (LC)
Silver medal – second place	2024 Belgrade	200 m breaststroke

Clara Rybak-Andersen (born 18 December 2003) is a Danish swimmer. She competed in the female 4 × 100 metre medley relay at the 2020 Summer Olympics.
