= Swimming at the 2016 European Aquatics Championships – Women's 100 metre breaststroke =

Women's 100 metre breaststroke at the 2016 European Aquatics Championships
- Dates: 17–18 May
- Competitors: 48 from 28 nations
- Winning time: 1:06.17

Medalists
gold medal	Rūta Meilutytė	Lithuania
silver medal	Hrafnhildur Lúthersdóttir	Iceland
bronze medal	Chloe Tutton	Great Britain

The Women's 100 metre breaststroke competition of the 2016 European Aquatics Championships was held on 17 and 18 May 2016.

== Records ==
Prior to the competition, the existing world, European and championship records were as follows.

	Name	Nation	Time	Location	Date
World record	Rūta Meilutytė	Lithuania	1:04.35	Barcelona	29 July 2013
European record	Rūta Meilutytė	Lithuania	1:04.35	Barcelona	29 July 2013
Championship record	Rikke Møller Pedersen	Denmark	1:06.23	Berlin	20 August 2014

== Results ==
=== Heats ===
The heats were held on 17 May at 10:29.

Rank	Heat	Lane	Name	Nationality	Time	Notes
1	5	4	Rūta Meilutytė	Lithuania	1:06.97	Q
2	4	3	Jenna Laukkanen	Finland	1:07.67	Q
3	4	4	Martina Carraro	Italy	1:07.73	Q
4	3	3	Chloe Tutton	Great Britain	1:07.92	Q
5	5	5	Hrafnhildur Lúthersdóttir	Iceland	1:07.99	Q
6	5	1	Martina Moravčíková	Czech Republic	1:08.25	Q
7	4	5	Arianna Castiglioni	Italy	1:08.31	Q
8	3	7	Molly Renshaw	Great Britain	1:08.43	Q
9	3	6	Sophie Hansson	Sweden	1:08.56	Q
10	3	4	Viktoriya Zeynep Güneş	Turkey	1:08.59	Q
11	5	3	Fanny Lecluyse	Belgium	1:08.67	Q
12	3	5	Fiona Doyle	Ireland	1:08.79	Q
13	5	6	Ilaria Scarcella	Italy	1:08.83	
14	4	7	Petra Chocová	Czech Republic	1:08.86	Q
15	5	2	Natalia Ivaneeva	Russia	1:09.09	Q
16	5	0	Vilma Ekström	Sweden	1:09.16	Q
17	3	8	Silja Kaensaekoski	Finland	1:09.20	Q
18	4	1	Fanny Deberghes	France	1:09.39	
19	1	4	Andrea Podmaníková	Slovakia	1:09.61	
20	4	8	Dalma Sebestyén	Hungary	1:09.67	
21	4	9	Jessica Steiger	Germany	1:09.71	
22	4	2	Mariya Liver	Ukraine	1:09.78	
23	3	0	Jessica Eriksson	Sweden	1:09.88	
24	2	2	Ariel Braathen	Norway	1:09.89	
25	2	5	Maria Romanjuk	Estonia	1:09.95	
26	4	6	Amit Ivry	Israel	1:10.08	
27	5	7	Katie Matts	Great Britain	1:10.12	
27	4	0	Lisa Fissneider	Italy	1:10.12	
29	3	2	Tjaša Vozel	Slovenia	1:10.16	
30	3	1	Mona McSharry	Ireland	1:10.27	
31	2	6	Lena Kreundl	Austria	1:10.30	
32	2	0	Christina Nothdurfter	Austria	1:10.53	
33	5	9	Dominika Sztandera	Poland	1:10.66	
34	2	3	Alina Bulmag	Moldova	1:10.74	
35	5	8	Ana Rodrigues	Portugal	1:10.75	
36	2	8	Lisa Mamie	Switzerland	1:10.80	
37	1	5	Veera Kivirinta	Finland	1:10.97	
38	1	6	Monika Štěpánová	Czech Republic	1:10.99	
39	2	4	Alina Zmushka	Belarus	1:11.13	
40	3	9	Sycerika McMahon	Ireland	1:11.18	
41	1	2	Maria Harutjunjan	Estonia	1:11.22	
42	1	3	Aļona Ribakova	Latvia	1:11.23	
43	2	7	Weronika Paluszek	Poland	1:11.28	
44	2	9	Lisa Zaiser	Austria	1:11.75	
45	1	1	Emina Pasukan	Bosnia and Herzegovina	1:12.23	
46	2	1	Stina Colleou	Norway	1:12.49	
47	1	7	Karleen Kersa	Estonia	1:12.87	
48	1	8	Lucia Ledererová	Slovakia	1:15.66	

=== Semifinals ===
The semifinals were held on 17 May at 18:42.

==== Semifinal 1 ====
Rank	Lane	Name	Nationality	Time	Notes
1	5	Chloe Tutton	Great Britain	1:07.69	Q
2	2	Viktoriya Zeynep Güneş	Turkey	1:07.81	Q
3	6	Molly Renshaw	Great Britain	1:07.82	Q
4	7	Fiona Doyle	Ireland	1:07.99	Q
5	4	Jenna Laukkanen	Finland	1:08.22	
6	1	Natalia Ivaneeva	Russia	1:08.59	
7	3	Martina Moravčíková	Czech Republic	1:08.80	
8	8	Silja Kaensaekoski	Finland	1:08.85	

==== Semifinal 2 ====
Rank	Lane	Name	Nationality	Time	Notes
1	4	Rūta Meilutytė	Lithuania	1:06.16	Q, CR
2	3	Hrafnhildur Lúthersdóttir	Iceland	1:07.28	Q
3	5	Martina Carraro	Italy	1:07.53	Q
4	2	Sophie Hansson	Sweden	1:07.59	Q
5	6	Arianna Castiglioni	Italy	1:08.29	
6	1	Petra Chocová	Czech Republic	1:08.35	
7	7	Fanny Lecluyse	Belgium	1:08.38	
8	8	Vilma Ekström	Sweden	1:09.48	

=== Final ===
The final was held on 18 May at 18:57.

Rank	Lane	Name	Nationality	Time	Notes
1st place, gold medalist(s)	4	Rūta Meilutytė	Lithuania	1:06.17	
2nd place, silver medalist(s)	5	Hrafnhildur Lúthersdóttir	Iceland	1:06.45	
3rd place, bronze medalist(s)	2	Chloe Tutton	Great Britain	1:07.50	
4	8	Fiona Doyle	Ireland	1:07.76	
5	3	Martina Carraro	Italy	1:07.81	
6	7	Viktoriya Zeynep Güneş	Turkey	1:07.83	
7	1	Molly Renshaw	Great Britain	1:07.93	
8	6	Sophie Hansson	Sweden	1:07.99	
