= Swimming at the 2014 European Aquatics Championships – Women's 100 metre breaststroke =

Women's 100 metre breaststroke at the Swimming at the 2014 European Aquatics Championships
- Dates: 19–20 August
- Competitors: 46 from 26 nations
- Winning time: 1:06.23

Medalists
gold medal	Rikke Møller Pedersen	Denmark
silver medal	Jennie Johansson	Sweden
bronze medal	Arianna Castiglioni	Italy

The Women's 100 metre breaststroke competition of the 2014 European Aquatics Championships was held on 19–20 August.

== Records ==
Prior to the competition, the existing world, European and championship records were as follows.

	Name	Nation	Time	Location	Date
World record	Rūta Meilutytė	Lithuania	1:04.35	Barcelona	28 July 2013
European record	Rūta Meilutytė	Lithuania	1:04.35	Barcelona	29 July 2013
Championship record	Yuliya Yefimova	Russia	1:06.32	Budapest	11 August 2010

== Results ==
=== Heats ===
The heats were held at 09:53.

Rank	Heat	Lane	Name	Nationality	Time	Notes
1	4	6	Arianna Castiglioni	Italy	1:07.50	Q
2	5	4	Rikke Møller Pedersen	Denmark	1:07.57	Q
3	5	6	Petra Chocová	Czech Republic	1:07.66	Q
4	3	4	Jèssica Vall	Spain	1:07.83	Q
4	5	5	Jennie Johansson	Sweden	1:07.83	Q
6	5	3	Moniek Nijhuis	Netherlands	1:08.16	Q
7	3	3	Vitalina Simonova	Russia	1:08.27	Q
8	5	1	Martina Moravčíková	Czech Republic	1:08.39	Q
9	3	2	Amit Ivry	Israel	1:08.55	Q
10	3	5	Fiona Doyle	Ireland	1:08.77	Q
11	3	7	Mariya Liver	Ukraine	1:08.81	Q
12	4	2	Vanessa Grimberg	Germany	1:08.84	Q
12	4	3	Maria Astashkina	Russia	1:08.84	Q
14	3	1	Fanny Lecluyse	Belgium	1:08.97	Q
15	4	7	Hrafnhildur Lúthersdóttir	Iceland	1:09.12	Q
16	3	6	Giulia De Ascentis	Italy	1:09.19	Q
17	4	0	Sycerika McMahon	Ireland	1:09.23	
18	5	0	Olga Tovstogan	Ukraine	1:09.27	
19	4	1	Molly Renshaw	Great Britain	1:09.30	
20	5	7	Jenna Laukkanen	Finland	1:09.31	
21	4	5	Marina García Urzainqui	Spain	1:09.41	
22	3	9	Coralie Dobral	France	1:09.84	
23	5	2	Joline Höstman	Sweden	1:09.98	
24	5	8	Claire Polit	France	1:10.33	
25	3	0	Tjaša Vozel	Slovenia	1:10.42	
26	3	8	Elisa Celli	Italy	1:10.50	
27	2	0	Tanja Šmid	Slovenia	1:10.60	
28	2	2	Maria Romanjuk	Estonia	1:10.69	
29	2	3	Ana Radič	Croatia	1:10.72	
30	4	9	Vilma Ekström	Sweden	1:10.76	
31	2	6	Jessica Eriksson	Sweden	1:10.88	
32	4	8	Louise Dalgaard	Denmark	1:10.92	
32	5	9	Alona Ribakova	Latvia	1:10.92	
34	2	4	Anastasia Korotkov	Israel	1:11.00	
35	2	5	Veera Kivirinta	Finland	1:11.12	
36	1	7	Gizem Bozkurt	Turkey	1:11.59	
37	2	8	Tatiana Chişca	Moldova	1:11.80	
38	2	7	Andrea Podmaníková	Slovakia	1:11.97	
39	2	9	Ivana Ninković	Bosnia and Herzegovina	1:12.55	
39	1	6	Maria Harutjunjan	Estonia	1:12.55	
41	1	1	Alina Bulmag	Moldova	1:12.98	
42	4	4	Sophie Taylor	Great Britain	1:13.47	
43	1	2	Eva Jordová	Czech Republic	1:13.70	
44	1	5	Jovana Bogdanović	Serbia	1:13.86	
45	1	3	Edita Chrápavá	Czech Republic	1:17.08	
—	2	1	Stina Collelou	Norway		DSQ
—	1	4	Anna Maekinen	Finland		DNS

=== Semifinals ===
The semifinals were held at 18:38.

==== Semifinal 1 ====
Rank	Lane	Name	Nationality	Time	Notes
1	4	Rikke Møller Pedersen	Denmark	1:06.34	Q
2	5	Jennie Johansson	Sweden	1:07.39	Q
3	7	Maria Astashkina	Russia	1:07.66	Q
4	3	Moniek Nijhuis	Netherlands	1:07.82	Q
5	8	Giulia De Ascentis	Italy	1:08.20	
6	6	Martina Moravčíková	Czech Republic	1:08.38	
7	2	Fiona Doyle	Ireland	1:08.39	
8	1	Fanny Lecluyse	Belgium	1:08.89	

==== Semifinal 2 ====
Rank	Lane	Name	Nationality	Time	Notes
1	4	Arianna Castiglioni	Italy	1:07.31	Q
2	3	Jèssica Vall	Spain	1:07.52	Q
3	5	Petra Chocová	Czech Republic	1:07.70	Q
4	6	Vitalina Simonova	Russia	1:07.84	Q
5	2	Amit Ivry	Israel	1:07.89	
6	8	Hrafnhildur Lúthersdóttir	Iceland	1:08.19	
7	1	Vanessa Grimberg	Germany	1:08.50	
8	7	Mariya Liver	Ukraine	1:08.59	

=== Final ===
The final was held 18:57.

Rank	Lane	Name	Nationality	Time	Notes
1st place, gold medalist(s)	4	Rikke Møller Pedersen	Denmark	1:06.23	CR
2nd place, silver medalist(s)	3	Jennie Johansson	Sweden	1:07.04	
3rd place, bronze medalist(s)	5	Arianna Castiglioni	Italy	1:07.36	
4	6	Jèssica Vall	Spain	1:07.51	
5	1	Moniek Nijhuis	Netherlands	1:07.64	
6	8	Vitalina Simonova	Russia	1:07.99	
7	7	Petra Chocová	Czech Republic	1:08.11	
8	2	Maria Astashkina	Russia	1:08.19	
