= Swimming at the 2016 European Aquatics Championships – Women's 50 metre breaststroke =

Women's 50 metre breaststroke at the 2016 European Aquatics Championships
- Dates: 21–22 May
- Competitors: 41 from 23 nations
- Winning time: 30.81

Medalists
gold medal	Jennie Johansson	Sweden
silver medal	Hrafnhildur Lúthersdóttir	Iceland
bronze medal	Jenna Laukkanen	Finland

The Women's 50 metre breaststroke competition of the 2016 European Aquatics Championships was held on 21 and 22 May 2016.

== Records ==
Prior to the competition, the existing world, European and championship records were as follows.

	Name	Nation	Time	Location	Date
World record	Rūta Meilutytė	Lithuania	29.48	Barcelona	3 August 2013
European record	Rūta Meilutytė	Lithuania	29.48	Barcelona	3 August 2013
Championship record	Rūta Meilutytė	Lithuania	29.88	Berlin	23 August 2014

== Results ==
=== Heats ===
The heats were held on 21 May at 09:00.

Rank	Heat	Lane	Name	Nationality	Time	Notes
1	5	4	Jennie Johansson	Sweden	30.75	Q
2	3	3	Hrafnhildur Lúthersdóttir	Iceland	30.94	Q
3	3	5	Jenna Laukkanen	Finland	31.01	Q
4	5	5	Arianna Castiglioni	Italy	31.02	Q
5	3	4	Mariya Liver	Ukraine	31.16	Q
6	5	6	Sophie Hansson	Sweden	31.19	Q
7	4	3	Natalia Ivaneeva	Russia	31.22	Q
8	5	3	Martina Carraro	Italy	31.27	Q
9	5	2	Petra Chocová	Czech Republic	31.41	Q
10	4	2	Veera Kivirinta	Finland	31.42	Q
11	4	5	Fanny Lecluyse	Belgium	31.67	Q
12	3	2	Dominika Sztandera	Poland	31.68	Q
13	3	8	Martina Moravčíková	Czech Republic	31.70	Q
14	4	6	Fiona Doyle	Ireland	31.80	Q
15	5	1	Jessica Eriksson	Sweden	31.82	
16	5	7	Amit Ivry	Israel	31.90	Q
17	5	0	Christina Nothdurfter	Austria	31.99	Q
18	3	9	Silja Kaensaekoski	Finland	32.06	
19	4	1	Jessica Vall	Spain	32.14	
20	4	0	Vilma Ekström	Sweden	32.21	
21	5	9	Ana Rodrigues	Portugal	32.27	
22	5	8	Alina Zmushka	Belarus	32.34	
23	2	5	Andrea Podmaníková	Slovakia	32.49	
24	2	6	Maria Romanjuk	Estonia	32.52	
25	4	7	Tjaša Vozel	Slovenia	32.54	
26	3	6	Ilaria Scarcella	Italy	32.55	
27	3	7	Katie Matts	Great Britain	32.63	
28	3	0	Lena Kreundl	Austria	32.65	
29	4	9	Sycerika McMahon	Ireland	32.78	
30	2	3	Lucia Ledererová	Slovakia	32.87	
31	2	7	Maria Harutjunjan	Estonia	32.88	
31	2	8	Ariel Braathen	Norway	32.88	
33	2	0	Molly Renshaw	Great Britain	32.91	
34	2	2	Karleen Kersa	Estonia	33.05	
35	2	1	Lisa Mamie	Switzerland	33.24	
36	3	1	Lisa Fissneider	Italy	33.48	
37	1	5	Emina Pasukan	Bosnia and Herzegovina	33.51	
38	1	3	Monika Štěpánová	Czech Republic	33.55	
39	1	4	Stina Colleou	Norway	33.59	
40	2	9	Alina Bulmag	Moldova	33.65	
	2	4	Dalma Sebestyén	Hungary	DSQ	
	4	4	Viktoriya Zeynep Güneş	Turkey	DNS	
	4	8	Fanny Deberghes	France	DNS	

=== Semifinals ===
The semifinals were held on 21 May at 16:23.

==== Semifinal 1 ====
Rank	Lane	Name	Nationality	Time	Notes
1	4	Hrafnhildur Lúthersdóttir	Iceland	30.83	Q
2	3	Sophie Hansson	Sweden	30.95	Q
3	2	Veera Kivirinta	Finland	30.98	Q
4	6	Martina Carraro	Italy	31.14	S-off
5	5	Arianna Castiglioni	Italy	31.16	
6	1	Fiona Doyle	Ireland	31.66	
7	7	Dominika Sztandera	Poland	31.71	
8	8	Christina Nothdurfter	Austria	32.04	

==== Semifinal 2 ====
Rank	Lane	Name	Nationality	Time	Notes
1	4	Jennie Johansson	Sweden	30.74	Q
2	5	Jenna Laukkanen	Finland	30.81	Q
3	3	Mariya Liver	Ukraine	30.90	Q
4	2	Petra Chocová	Czech Republic	31.13	Q
5	6	Natalia Ivaneeva	Russia	31.14	S-off
6	7	Fanny Lecluyse	Belgium	31.50	
7	1	Martina Moravčíková	Czech Republic	31.66	
8	8	Amit Ivry	Israel	31.94	

==== Swim-off ====
The Swim-off was held on 21 May at 18:32.

Rank	Lane	Name	Nationality	Time	Notes
1	5	Natalia Ivaneeva	Russia	30.95	Q
2	4	Martina Carraro	Italy	31.00	

=== Final ===
The final was held on 22 May at 16:12.

Rank	Lane	Name	Nationality	Time	Notes
1st place, gold medalist(s)	4	Jennie Johansson	Sweden	30.81	
2nd place, silver medalist(s)	3	Hrafnhildur Lúthersdóttir	Iceland	30.91	
3rd place, bronze medalist(s)	5	Jenna Laukkanen	Finland	30.95	
4	6	Mariya Liver	Ukraine	30.99	
5	7	Veera Kivirinta	Finland	31.12	
6	2	Sophie Hansson	Sweden	31.13	
7	8	Natalia Ivaneeva	Russia	31.18	
8	1	Petra Chocová	Czech Republic	31.63	
