= Swimming at the 2016 European Aquatics Championships – Women's 200 metre breaststroke =

Women's 200 metre breaststroke at the 2016 European Aquatics Championships
- Dates: 19 May
- Competitors: 40 from 28 nations
- Winning time: 2:21.69

Medalists
gold medal	Rikke Møller Pedersen	Denmark
silver medal	Jessica Vall	Spain
bronze medal	Hrafnhildur Lúthersdóttir	Iceland

The Women's 200 metre breaststroke competition of the 2016 European Aquatics Championships was held on 19 May 2016.

== Records ==
Prior to the competition, the existing world, European and championship records were as follows.

	Name	Nation	Time	Location	Date
World record	Rikke Møller Pedersen	Denmark	2:19.11	Barcelona	28 July 2013
European record	Rikke Møller Pedersen	Denmark	2:19.11	Barcelona	28 July 2013
Championship record	Rikke Møller Pedersen	Denmark	2:19.84	Berlin	22 August 2014

== Results ==
=== Heats ===
The heats were held on 19 May at 10:00.

Rank	Heat	Lane	Name	Nationality	Time	Notes
1	3	5	Molly Renshaw	Great Britain	2:24.70	Q
2	3	4	Chloe Tutton	Great Britain	2:25.79	Q
3	4	4	Rikke Møller Pedersen	Denmark	2:25.90	Q
4	4	5	Hrafnhildur Lúthersdóttir	Iceland	2:25.99	Q
5	5	5	Jessica Vall	Spain	2:26.29	Q
6	5	4	Viktoriya Zeynep Güneş	Turkey	2:26.54	Q
7	4	3	Jenna Laukkanen	Finland	2:26.78	Q
8	3	2	Martina Moravčíková	Czech Republic	2:27.24	Q
9	5	6	Georgia Coates	Great Britain	2:27.79	
10	4	6	Dalma Sebestyén	Hungary	2:27.92	Q
11	3	3	Ilaria Scarcella	Italy	2:28.67	Q
12	4	7	Fiona Doyle	Ireland	2:29.07	Q
13	5	8	Jessica Eriksson	Sweden	2:29.68	Q
14	5	7	Jessica Steiger	Germany	2:29.96	Q
15	4	2	Francesca Fangio	Italy	2:30.08	Q
16	5	3	Fanny Lecluyse	Belgium	2:30.16	Q
17	5	0	Stina Colleou	Norway	2:30.30	Q
18	3	0	Vilma Ekström	Sweden	2:30.35	
19	3	6	Katie Matts	Great Britain	2:30.45	
20	5	2	Lisa Fissneider	Italy	2:30.65	
21	3	9	Andrea Podmaníková	Slovakia	2:30.67	
22	3	8	Lisa Mamie	Switzerland	2:30.82	
23	5	9	Monika Štěpánová	Czech Republic	2:31.04	
24	2	3	Maria Romanjuk	Estonia	2:31.55	
24	5	8	Weronika Paluszek	Poland	2:31.59	
26	2	4	Mona McSharry	Ireland	2:31.77	
27	4	1	Natalia Ivaneeva	Russia	2:31.86	
28	2	8	Petra Chocová	Czech Republic	2:32.45	
29	1	3	Patricia Aschan	Finland	2:32.61	
30	4	0	Victoria Kaminskaya	Portugal	2:33.34	
31	2	7	Sophie Hansson	Sweden	2:33.56	
32	51	1	Tjaša Vozel	Slovenia	2:33.86	
33	2	5	Raminta Dvarishkyte	Lithuania	2:34.90	
34	2	1	Aļona Ribakova	Latvia	2:35.18	
35	2	6	Ariel Braathen	Norway	2:35.78	
36	4	9	Mariya Liver	Ukraine	2:36.47	
37	1	5	Emina Pašukan	Bosnia and Herzegovina	2:38.27	
38	1	4	Alina Bulmag	Moldova	2:39.52	
39	2	2	Ana Rodrigues	Portugal	2:39.79	
	3	1	Ana Radić	Croatia	DSQ	
	3	7	Fanny Deberghes	France	DNS	

=== Semifinals ===
The semifinals were held on 19 May at 19:21.

==== Semifinal 1 ====
Rank	Lane	Name	Nationality	Time	Notes
1	4	Chloe Tutton	Great Britain	2:23.76	Q
2	3	Viktoriya Zeynep Güneş	Turkey	2:23.94	Q
3	5	Hrafnhildur Lúthersdóttir	Iceland	2:24.11	Q
4	6	Martina Moravčíková	Czech Republic	2:25.78	Q
5	2	Ilaria Scarcella	Italy	2:28.09	
6	1	Francesca Fangio	Italy	2:28.42	
7	8	Stina Colleou	Norway	2:29.03	
8	7	Jessica Eriksson	Sweden	2:29.22	

==== Semifinal 2 ====
Rank	Lane	Name	Nationality	Time	Notes
1	5	Rikke Møller Pedersen	Denmark	2:24.10	Q
2	3	Jessica Vall	Spain	2:24.56	Q
3	4	Molly Renshaw	Great Britain	2:24.85	Q
4	6	Jenna Laukkanen	Finland	2:25.47	Q
5	8	Fanny Lecluyse	Belgium	2:25.92	
6	2	Dalma Sebestyén	Hungary	2:26.53	
7	7	Fiona Doyle	Ireland	2:28.75	
8	1	Jessica Steiger	Germany	2:29.62	

=== Final ===
The final was held on 20 May at 18:40.

Rank	Lane	Name	Nationality	Time	Notes
1st place, gold medalist(s)	3	Rikke Møller Pedersen	Denmark	2:21.69	
2nd place, silver medalist(s)	2	Jessica Vall	Spain	2:22.56	
3rd place, bronze medalist(s)	6	Hrafnhildur Lúthersdóttir	Iceland	2:22.96	
4	7	Molly Renshaw	Great Britain	2:23.18	
5	5	Viktoriya Zeynep Güneş	Turkey	2:23.40	
6	4	Chloe Tutton	Great Britain	2:24.07	
7	1	Jenna Laukkanen	Finland	2:25.97	
8	8	Martina Moravčíková	Czech Republic	2:29.42	
