= Swimming at the 2012 European Aquatics Championships – Women's 100 metre breaststroke =

Women's 100 metre breaststroke at the 2012 European Aquatics Championships
- Dates: May 22, 2012 (heats and semifinals); May 23, 2012 (final)
- Competitors: 49 from 29 nations
- Winning time: 1:07.33

Medalists
gold medal	Sarah Poewe	Germany
silver medal	Jennie Johansson	Sweden
bronze medal	Marina Garcia Urzainqui	Spain

The women's 100 metre breaststroke competition of the swimming events at the 2012 European Aquatics Championships took place May 22 and 23. The heats and semifinals took place on May 22, the final on May 23.

== Records ==
Prior to the competition, the existing world, European and championship records were as follows.

	Name	Nation	Time	Location	Date
World record	Jessica Hardy	United States	1:04.45	Federal Way	August 7, 2009
European record	Yuliya Efimova	Russia	1:05.41	Rome	July 28, 2009
Championship record	Yuliya Efimova	Russia	1:06.32	Budapest	August 11, 2010

== Results ==
=== Heats ===
49 swimmers participated in 7 heats.

Rank	Heat	Lane	Name	Nationality	Time	Notes
1	7	3	Caroline Ruhnau	Germany	1:07.85	Q
2	6	4	Sarah Poewe	Germany	1:08.05	Q
3	6	6	Sycerika McMahon	Ireland	1:08.37	Q, NR
4	7	4	Jennie Johansson	Sweden	1:08.38	Q
5	6	3	Petra Chocová	Czech Republic	1:08.58	Q
6	7	5	Concepcion Badillo Diaz	Spain	1:08.75	Q
7	5	7	Martina Moravciková	Czech Republic	1:08.92	Q
8	5	5	Marina Garcia Urzainqui	Spain	1:09.17	Q
9	7	6	Valentina Artemyeva	Russia	1:09.35	Q
10	4	5	Katharina Stiberg	Norway	1:09.65	Q
11	6	8	Hrafnhildur Lúthersdóttir	Iceland	1:09.66	Q
12	5	2	Chiara Boggiatto	Italy	1:09.67	Q
13	7	7	Dilara Buse Günaydin	Turkey	1:09.67	Q
14	5	8	Tanja Šmid	Slovenia	1:09.98	Q
15	5	6	Fiona Doyle	Ireland	1:10.16	Q
16	4	6	Mariya Liver	Ukraine	1:10.21	Q
17	6	5	Joline Höstman	Sweden	1:10.23	
18	7	1	Anna Sztankovics	Hungary	1:10.37	
19	4	3	Sara Nordenstam	Norway	1:10.39	
20	7	2	Vanessa Grimberg	Germany	1:10.46	
21	5	3	Sophie Allen	Great Britain	1:10.56	
22	2	2	Brigitta Gregus	Hungary	1:10.59	
23	6	2	Irina Novikova	Russia	1:10.61	
24	5	4	Lisa Fissneider	Italy	1:10.69	
25	5	1	Fanny Lecluyse	Belgium	1:10.82	
26	2	5	Alona Ribakova	Latvia	1:10.83	NR
26	3	4	Ganna Dzerkal	Ukraine	1:10.83	
28	7	8	Fanny Babou	France	1:10.88	
29	4	4	Ana Pinho Rodrigues	Portugal	1:10.91	
30	6	7	Tjasa Vozel	Slovenia	1:10.93	
31	3	6	Raminta Dvariškytė	Lithuania	1:11.07	
32	1	5	Ivana Ninković	Bosnia and Herzegovina	1:11.19	NR
33	3	8	Anastasia Christoforou	Cyprus	1:11.34	
34	4	8	Zuzana Mimovicová	Slovakia	1:11.65	
35	2	4	Anastasiya Malyavina	Ukraine	1:11.94	
35	3	3	Erla Dögg Haraldsdóttir	Iceland	1:11.94	
37	4	2	Mario Georgia Michalaka	Greece	1:11.98	
38	4	1	Ewa Scieszko	Poland	1:12.12	
39	3	7	Shani Stallard	Ireland	1:12.28	
40	4	7	Tatiana Chisca	Moldova	1:12.30	
41	3	5	Evghenia Tanasienco	Moldova	1:12.33	
42	2	7	Dorottya Bíró	Hungary	1:12.70	
43	3	2	Helena Pikhartová	Czech Republic	1:12.84	
44	2	6	Sandra Swierczewska	Austria	1:13.14	
45	2	3	Evelina Aizpuriete	Latvia	1:13.23	
46	1	4	Vangelina Draganova	Bulgaria	1:13.89	
47	1	3	Maria Harutjunjan	Estonia	1:14.22	
	6	1	Jenna Laukkanen	Finland	DSQ	
	3	1	Ceren Dilek	Turkey	DSQ	

=== Semifinals ===
The eight fasters swimmers advanced to the final.

==== Semifinal 1 ====
Rank	Lane	Name	Nationality	Time	Notes
1	5	Jennie Johansson	Sweden	1:07.65	Q
2	4	Sarah Poewe	Germany	1:07.70	Q
3	6	Marina Garcia Urzainqui	Spain	1:08.08	Q
4	3	Concepcion Badilla Diaz	Spain	1:08.40	Q
5	7	Chiara Boggiatto	Italy	1:08.87	Q
6	8	Mariya Liver	Ukraine	1:09.22	
7	1	Katharina Stiberg	Norway	1:09.44	
	2	Tanja Šmid	Slovenia		DSQ

==== Semifinal 2 ====
Rank	Lane	Name	Nationality	Time	Notes
1	4	Caroline Ruhnau	Germany	1:08.01	Q
2	5	Sycerika McMahon	Ireland	1:08.37	Q, NR
3	6	Martina Moravciková	Czech Republic	1:08.93	Q
4	3	Petra Chocová	Czech Republic	1:09.00	
5	8	Fiona Doyle	Ireland	1:09.68	
6	2	Valentina Artemyeva	Russia	1:09.76	
7	7	Hrafnhildur Lúthersdóttir	Iceland	1:10.06	
8	1	Dilara Buse Günaydin	Turkey	1:10.32	

=== Final ===
The final was held at 17.52.

Rank	Lane	Name	Nationality	Time	Notes
1st place, gold medalist(s)	5	Sarah Poewe	Germany	1:07.33	
2nd place, silver medalist(s)	4	Jennie Johansson	Sweden	1:07.85	
3rd place, bronze medalist(s)	6	Marina Garcia Urzainqui	Spain	1:07.91	
4	3	Caroline Ruhnau	Germany	1:07.95	
5	2	Sycerika McMahon	Ireland	1:08.72	
6	7	Concepcion Badilla Diaz	Spain	1:08.76	
7	1	Chiara Boggiatto	Italy	1:08.82	
8	8	Martina Moravciková	Czech Republic	1:08.87	
