= 2014 FINA World Swimming Championships (25 m) – Women's 100 metre breaststroke =

Women's 100 metre breaststroke at the 2014 FINA World Swimming Championships (25 m)
- Dates: 5 December (heats and semifinals); 6 December (final)
- Competitors: 57 from 46 nations
- Winning time: 1:02.36

Medalists
gold medal	Alia Atkinson	Jamaica
silver medal	Rūta Meilutytė	Lithuania
bronze medal	Moniek Nijhuis	Netherlands

The Women's 100 metre breaststroke competition of the 2014 FINA World Swimming Championships (25 m) was held on 5 December with the heats and the semifinals and 6 December with the final.

== Records ==
Prior to the competition, the existing world and championship records were as follows.

	Name	Nation	Time	Location	Date
World record	Rūta Meilutytė	Lithuania	1:02.36	Moscow	12 October 2013
Championship record	Rūta Meilutytė	Lithuania	1:03.52	Istanbul	15 December 2012

The following records were established during the competition:

Date	Event	Name	Nation	Time	Record
5 December	Semifinals	Rūta Meilutytė	Lithuania	1:02.43	CR
6 December	Final	Alia Atkinson	Jamaica	1:02.36	CR, =WR

== Results ==
=== Heats ===
The heats were held at 10:55.

Rank	Heat	Lane	Name	Nationality	Time	Notes
1	5	5	Moniek Nijhuis	Netherlands	1:04.32	Q
2	5	4	Rūta Meilutytė	Lithuania	1:04.47	Q
3	3	2	Shi Jinglin	China	1:04.88	Q
4	4	4	Rikke Møller Pedersen	Denmark	1:04.91	Q
5	6	4	Alia Atkinson	Jamaica	1:04.98	Q
6	5	3	Kanako Watanabe	Japan	1:05.04	Q
7	6	8	Emma Reaney	United States	1:05.17	Q
8	4	6	Fanny Lecluyse	Belgium	1:05.21	Q
9	4	3	Sally Hunter	Australia	1:05.24	Q
10	4	7	Viktoria Güneş	Turkey	1:05.31	Q
11	4	5	Jennie Johansson	Sweden	1:05.39	
12	5	6	Mariia Astashkina	Russia	1:05.53	
13	6	3	Leiston Pickett	Australia	1:05.62	Q
14	4	8	Jenna Laukkanen	Finland	1:05.64	Q
15	6	5	Satomi Suzuki	Japan	1:05.92	Q
16	3	7	Kierra Smith	Canada	1:06.13	
16	6	1	Tjaša Vozel	Slovenia	1:06.13	
16	6	2	Melanie Margalis	United States	1:06.13	
19	4	0	Sophie Taylor	Great Britain	1:06.14	
19	6	7	Vanessa Grimberg	Germany	1:06.14	
21	4	1	Jèssica Vall Montero	Spain	1:06.22	
22	5	8	Hrafnhildur Lúthersdóttir	Iceland	1:06.26	
23	6	0	Petra Chocová	Czech Republic	1:06.43	
24	5	7	Arianna Castiglioni	Italy	1:06.49	
25	5	2	Ganna Dzerkal	Ukraine	1:06.50	
26	5	0	Mariya Liver	Ukraine	1:06.60	
27	4	2	Tera van Beilen	Canada	1:06.61	
28	6	6	Valentina Artemeva	Russia	1:06.80	
29	5	1	Amit Ivry	Israel	1:07.24	
30	4	9	Zhang Xinyu	China	1:07.36	
31	6	9	Ana Carla Carvalho	Brazil	1:07.82	
32	3	8	Hannah Miley	Great Britain	1:07.86	
33	3	5	Lisa Zaiser	Austria	1:07.97	
34	3	4	Julia Sebastian	Argentina	1:08.45	
35	3	3	Tatjana Schoenmaker	South Africa	1:08.62	
36	5	9	Ana Radić	Croatia	1:09.04	
37	2	2	Fanni Gyurinovics	Hungary	1:09.27	
38	3	1	Gulsen Samancı	Turkey	1:09.32	
39	3	9	Emily Visagie	South Africa	1:09.33	
40	3	0	Tatiana Chişca	Moldova	1:09.63	
41	2	3	Amira Kouza	Algeria	1:10.01	
42	2	4	Karleen Kersa	Estonia	1:10.38	
43	3	6	Dariya Talanova	Kyrgyzstan	1:10.77	
44	2	6	Daniela Lindemeier	Namibia	1:10.79	
45	2	1	Lin Pei-wun	Chinese Taipei	1:11.19	
46	2	7	Sofía López	Paraguay	1:12.41	
47	2	0	María Burgos	Puerto Rico	1:13.55	
48	1	4	Savannah Tkatchenko	Papua New Guinea	1:14.88	
49	1	3	Oreoluwa Cherebin	Grenada	1:14.98	
50	1	6	Rachael Tonjor	Nigeria	1:17.95	
51	2	9	Tegan McCarthy	Papua New Guinea	1:18.51	
52	1	5	San Su Moe Theint	Myanmar	1:18.63	
53	1	2	Bonita Imsirovic	Botswana	1:20.10	
54	2	5	Maria Marzocchi	Seychelles	1:27.12	
55	1	7	Angela Kendrick	Marshall Islands	1:29.81	
56	1	8	Sogbadji Charmel	Benin	1:41.42	
—	2	8	Chade Nersicio	Curaçao		DNS
—	1	1	Niharika Tuladhar	Nepal		DSQ

=== Swim-off ===
The swim-off was held at 12:27.

Rank	Lane	Name	Nationality	Time	Notes
1	4	Kierra Smith	Canada	1:05.65	Q
2	5	Tjaša Vozel	Slovenia	1:06.35	

=== Semifinals ===
The semifinals were held at 19:09.

==== Semifinal 1 ====
Rank	Lane	Name	Nationality	Time	Notes
1	4	Rūta Meilutytė	Lithuania	1:02.43	Q, CR
2	5	Rikke Møller Pedersen	Denmark	1:04.71	Q
3	6	Fanny Lecluyse	Belgium	1:04.87	Q
4	3	Kanako Watanabe	Japan	1:05.21	
5	8	Kierra Smith	Canada	1:05.57	
6	2	Viktoria Güneş	Turkey	1:05.67	
7	1	Jenna Laukkanen	Finland	1:05.70	
8	7	Mariia Astashkina	Russia	1:05.72	

==== Semifinal 2 ====
Rank	Lane	Name	Nationality	Time	Notes
1	3	Alia Atkinson	Jamaica	1:03.59	Q
2	4	Moniek Nijhuis	Netherlands	1:03.96	Q
3	2	Sally Hunter	Australia	1:04.23	Q
4	5	Shi Jinglin	China	1:04.54	Q
5	7	Jennie Johansson	Sweden	1:05.04	Q
6	6	Emma Reaney	United States	1:05.50	
7	1	Leiston Pickett	Australia	1:05.60	
8	8	Satomi Suzuki	Japan	1:05.90	

=== Final ===
The final were held at 18:06.

Rank	Lane	Name	Nationality	Time	Notes
1st place, gold medalist(s)	5	Alia Atkinson	Jamaica	1:02.36	CR, =WR
2nd place, silver medalist(s)	4	Rūta Meilutytė	Lithuania	1:02.46	
3rd place, bronze medalist(s)	3	Moniek Nijhuis	Netherlands	1:04.03	
4	2	Shi Jinglin	China	1:04.52	
5	6	Sally Hunter	Australia	1:04.82	
6	7	Rikke Møller Pedersen	Denmark	1:04.84	
7	8	Jennie Johansson	Sweden	1:05.08	
8	1	Fanny Lecluyse	Belgium	1:05.58	
