= Swimming at the 2014 European Aquatics Championships – Women's 50 metre breaststroke =

Women's 50 metre breaststroke at the Swimming at the 2014 European Aquatics Championships
- Dates: 23–24 August
- Competitors: 47 from 26 nations
- Winning time: 29.89

Medalists
gold medal	Rūta Meilutytė	Lithuania
silver medal	Jennie Johansson	Sweden
bronze medal	Moniek Nijhuis	Netherlands

The Women's 50 metre breaststroke competition of the 2014 European Aquatics Championships was held on 23–24 August.

== Records ==
Prior to the competition, the existing world, European and championship records were as follows.

	Name	Nation	Time	Location	Date
World record	Rūta Meilutytė	Lithuania	29.48	Barcelona	3 August 2013
European record	Rūta Meilutytė	Lithuania	29.48	Barcelona	3 August 2013
Championship record	Yuliya Yefimova	Russia	30.29	Budapest	15 August 2010

== Results ==
=== Heats ===
The heats were held at 09:30.

Rank	Heat	Lane	Name	Nationality	Time	Notes
1	5	4	Rūta Meilutytė	Lithuania	30.73	Q
2	3	5	Moniek Nijhuis	Netherlands	30.75	Q
3	4	4	Jennie Johansson	Sweden	30.79	Q
4	4	3	Dorothea Brandt	Germany	30.82	Q
5	4	6	Sycerika McMahon	Ireland	31.02	Q
6	5	3	Mariya Liver	Ukraine	31.13	Q
7	4	5	Rikke Møller Pedersen	Denmark	31.21	Q
7	5	7	Hrafnhildur Lúthersdóttir	Iceland	31.21	Q
9	3	4	Petra Chocová	Czech Republic	31.25	Q
10	3	2	Arianna Castigloni	Italy	31.36	Q
11	4	8	Martina Moravčíková	Czech Republic	31.45	Q
12	4	7	Amit Ivry	Israel	31.50	Q
13	3	3	Fiona Doyle	Ireland	31.63	Q
14	4	1	Veera Kivrina	Finland	31.71	Q
15	5	1	Fanny Lecluyse	Belgium	31.84	Q
16	3	6	Caroline Ruhnau	Germany	31.85	Q
17	3	1	Louise Dalgaard	Denmark	31.90	
18	3	7	Jenna Laukkanen	Finland	31.91	
19	4	2	Jessica Vall	Spain	31.99	
20	5	0	Maria Astashkina	Russia	32.01	
21	2	2	Vitalina Simonova	Russia	32.03	
22	4	9	Jessica Eriksson	Sweden	32.13	
23	3	8	Tjaša Vozel	Slovenia	32.20	
24	5	2	Marina García Urzainqui	Spain	32.43	
25	2	3	Olga Tovstogan	Ukraine	32.45	
26	2	5	Coralie Dobral	France	32.53	
27	4	0	Giulia De Ascentis	Italy	32.54	
28	3	0	Anna Mäkinen	Finland	32.64	
29	3	9	Gizem Bozkurt	Turkey	32.68	
30	2	0	Vilma Ekström	Sweden	32.78	
31	2	8	Eva Jordová	Czech Republic	32.79	
32	5	8	Ivana Ninković	Bosnia and Herzegovina	32.82	
33	2	6	Claire Polit	France	32.83	
34	1	3	Andrea Podmaníková	Slovakia	32.87	
35	2	7	Christina Nothdurfter	Austria	32.90	
36	1	8	Maria Harutjunjan	Estonia	32.91	
37	2	9	Alona Ribakova	Latvia	32.94	
38	1	5	Maria Romanjuk	Estonia	33.14	
39	2	1	Tatiana Chişca	Moldova	33.15	
40	1	7	Stina Colleou	Norway	33.22	
41	2	4	Lisa Zaiser	Austria	33.23	
42	1	0	Alina Bulmag	Moldova	33.55	
43	1	1	Ana Radič	Croatia	33.72	
44	1	4	Anastasia Korotkov	Israel	33.73	
45	1	2	Julia Kukla	Austria	34.05	
46	1	6	Edita Chrápavá	Czech Republic	34.16	
—	5	6	Lisa Fissneider	Italy		DSQ
—	5	5	Sophie Taylor	Great Britain		DNS
—	5	9	Birgit Koschischek	Austria		DNS

=== Semifinals ===
The semifinals were held at 16:20.

==== Semifinal 1 ====
Rank	Lane	Name	Nationality	Time	Notes
1	5	Dorothea Brandt	Germany	30.83	Q
2	4	Moniek Nijhuis	Netherlands	30.98	Q
3	6	Hrafnhildur Lúthersdóttir	Iceland	31.31	Q
4	3	Mariya Liver	Ukraine	31.32	q, swim-off
5	7	Amit Ivry	Israel	31.42	
6	2	Arianna Castigloni	Italy	31.53	
7	1	Veera Kivrina	Finland	31.67	
8	8	Caroline Ruhnau	Germany	31.79	

==== Semifinal 2 ====
Rank	Lane	Name	Nationality	Time	Notes
1	4	Rūta Meilutytė	Lithuania	29.88	Q, CR
2	5	Jennie Johansson	Sweden	30.74	Q
3	2	Petra Chocová	Czech Republic	31.09	Q
4	1	Fiona Doyle	Ireland	31.30	Q
5	6	Rikke Møller Pedersen	Denmark	31.32	q, swim-off
6	3	Sycerika McMahon	Ireland	31.50	
7	7	Martina Moravčíková	Czech Republic	31.80	
8	8	Fanny Lecluyse	Belgium	32.25	

==== Swim-off ====
The swim-off was held at 18:19.

Rank	Lane	Name	Nationality	Time	Notes
1	5	Mariya Liver	Ukraine	31.23	Q
2	4	Rikke Møller Pedersen	Denmark	31.40	

=== Final ===
The final was held at 16:09.

Rank	Lane	Name	Nationality	Time	Notes
1st place, gold medalist(s)	4	Rūta Meilutytė	Lithuania	29.89	
2nd place, silver medalist(s)	5	Jennie Johansson	Sweden	30.52	
3rd place, bronze medalist(s)	6	Moniek Nijhuis	Netherlands	30.64	
4	8	Mariya Liver	Ukraine	30.68	
5	3	Dorothea Brandt	Germany	30.82	
6	2	Petra Chocová	Czech Republic	31.13	
7	7	Fiona Doyle	Ireland	31.37	
8	1	Hrafnhildur Lúthersdóttir	Iceland	31.53	
