= 2014 FINA World Swimming Championships (25 m) – Women's 50 metre breaststroke =

Women's 50 metre breaststroke at the 2014 FINA World Swimming Championships (25 m)
- Dates: 3 December (heats and semifinals); 4 December (final)
- Competitors: 65 from 49 nations
- Winning time: 28.84

Medalists
gold medal	Rūta Meilutytė	Lithuania
silver medal	Alia Atkinson	Jamaica
bronze medal	Moniek Nijhuis	Netherlands

The women's 50 metre breaststroke competition of the 2014 FINA World Swimming Championships (25 m) was held on 3 December with the heats and the semifinals and 4 December with the final.

== Records ==
Prior to the competition, the existing world and championship records were as follows.

	Name	Nation	Time	Location	Date
World record	Jessica Hardy	United States	28.80	Berlin	15 November 2009
Championship record	Rūta Meilutytė	Lithuania	29.44	Istanbul	13 December 2012

The following records were established during the competition:

Date	Event	Name	Nation	Time	Record
12 December	Semifinals	Rūta Meilutytė	Lithuania	28.81	CR

== Results ==
=== Heats ===
The heats were held at 10:05.

Rank	Heat	Lane	Name	Nationality	Time	Notes
1	7	4	Alia Atkinson	Jamaica	29.48	Q
2	5	4	Moniek Nijhuis	Netherlands	29.62	Q
3	6	4	Rūta Meilutytė	Lithuania	29.72	Q
4	5	5	Leiston Pickett	Australia	29.96	Q
5	6	3	Sally Hunter	Australia	30.06	Q
6	6	7	Fanny Lecluyse	Belgium	30.13	Q
7	4	3	Emma Reaney	United States	30.20	Q
8	5	3	Valentina Artemyeva	Russia	30.22	Q
9	7	5	Jennie Johansson	Sweden	30.43	Q
10	7	7	Jenna Laukkanen	Finland	30.54	Q
11	6	9	Sophie Taylor	Great Britain	30.57	Q
12	6	5	Rikke Møller Pedersen	Denmark	30.64	Q
13	5	6	Suo Ran	China	30.66	Q
14	6	6	Amit Ivry	Israel	30.68	Q
15	6	2	Tera van Beilen	Canada	30.71	Q
16	7	3	Satomi Suzuki	Japan	30.72	Q
17	5	7	Hanna Dzerkal	Ukraine	30.77	
18	5	8	Mariya Liver	Ukraine	30.78	
19	7	2	Hrafnhildur Lúthersdóttir	Iceland	30.79	
20	5	2	Petra Chocová	Czech Republic	30.87	
21	5	1	Kanako Watanabe	Japan	30.91	
21	7	6	He Yun	China	30.91	
23	6	8	Ana Carla Carvalho	Brazil	30.94	
24	7	1	Mariia Astashkina	Russia	30.98	
25	5	9	Lisa Zaiser	Austria	31.00	
26	7	0	Viktoria Güneş	Turkey	31.12	
27	7	8	Natalie Coughlin	United States	31.16	
28	4	5	Birgit Koschischek	Austria	31.18	
28	7	9	Tjaša Vozel	Slovenia	31.18	
30	5	0	Jèssica Vall Montero	Spain	31.28	
31	1	8	Kierra Smith	Canada	31.35	
32	4	9	Hanna-Maria Seppälä	Finland	31.39	
33	4	2	Gülşen Samancı	Turkey	31.52	
33	6	0	Arianna Castiglioni	Italy	31.52	
35	4	4	Julia Sebastian	Argentina	31.64	
36	1	1	Sviatlana Khakhlova	Belarus	31.71	
37	4	7	Tatjana Schoenmaker	South Africa	31.79	
38	3	4	Hannah Miley	Great Britain	31.84	
39	4	8	Tatiana Chişca	Moldova	31.96	
40	3	5	Emily Visagie	South Africa	32.01	
41	3	3	Fanni Gyurinovics	Hungary	32.02	
42	4	0	Karleen Kersa	Estonia	32.03	
43	6	1	Amira Kouza	Algeria	32.38	NR
44	3	7	Jenjira Srisa-Ard	Thailand	32.47	
45	4	6	Dariya Talanova	Kyrgyzstan	32.61	
46	3	6	Daniela Lindemeier	Namibia	33.18	
47	3	2	Chade Nersicio	Curaçao	33.78	
48	3	1	Savannah Tkatchenko	Papua New Guinea	34.25	
49	2	3	Matelita Buadromo	Fiji	34.50	
50	3	9	Oreoluwa Cherebin	Grenada	34.53	
51	3	0	Rachael Tonjor	Nigeria	35.36	
52	2	6	San Su Moe Theint	Myanmar	35.55	
53	2	4	Tegan McCarthy	Papua New Guinea	35.73	
54	3	8	Lianna Swan	Pakistan	36.03	
55	2	2	Bonita Imsirovic	Botswana	36.49	
56	2	1	Angelika Ouedraogo	Burkina Faso	38.11	
57	1	6	Niharika Tuladhar	Nepal	38.56	
58	2	7	Maria Marzocchi	Seychelles	38.66	
59	2	9	Angela Kendrick	Marshall Islands	39.95	
60	2	8	Annie Hepler	Marshall Islands	39.96	
61	1	4	Jamila Sanmoogan	Guyana	40.27	
62	4	1	Anisha Payet	Seychelles	44.46	
63	1	2	Sogbadji Charmel	Benin	44.52	
64	1	5	Ramata Coulibaly	Mali	47.77	
—	1	3	Christelle Moboutou	Republic of the Congo		DNS
—	1	7	Essolizam Awizoba	Togo		DNS
—	2	5	Kokoe Ahyee	Ivory Coast		DNS
—	2	0	Joyce Rudaseswa	Rwanda		DSQ

=== Semifinals ===
The semifinals were held at 18:07.

==== Semifinal 1 ====
Rank	Lane	Name	Nationality	Time	Notes
1	4	Moniek Nijhuis	Netherlands	29.69	Q
2	5	Leiston Pickett	Australia	29.79	Q
3	6	Valentina Artemyeva	Russia	30.31	Q
4	3	Fanny Lecluyse	Belgium	30.33	
5	7	Rikke Møller Pedersen	Denmark	30.42	
6	8	Satomi Suzuki	Japan	30.55	
7	2	Jenna Laukkanen	Finland	30.67	
8	1	Amit Ivry	Israel	30.91	

==== Semifinal 2 ====
Rank	Lane	Name	Nationality	Time	Notes
1	5	Rūta Meilutytė	Lithuania	28.81	Q, CR, ER
2	4	Alia Atkinson	Jamaica	28.99	Q
3	2	Jennie Johansson	Sweden	30.08	Q
3	3	Sally Hunter	Australia	30.08	Q
5	6	Emma Reaney	United States	30.32	Q
6	7	Sophie Taylor	Great Britain	30.46	
7	1	Suo Ran	China	30.71	
8	8	Tera van Beilen	Canada	31.03	

=== Final ===
The final was held at 18:22.

Rank	Lane	Name	Nationality	Time	Notes
1st place, gold medalist(s)	4	Rūta Meilutytė	Lithuania	28.84	
2nd place, silver medalist(s)	5	Alia Atkinson	Jamaica	28.91	
3rd place, bronze medalist(s)	3	Moniek Nijhuis	Netherlands	29.64	
4	6	Leiston Pickett	Australia	29.83	
5	2	Jennie Johansson	Sweden	29.99	
6	8	Emma Reaney	United States	30.05	
7	7	Sally Hunter	Australia	30.22	
8	1	Valentina Artemyeva	Russia	30.37	
