= 2016 FINA World Swimming Championships (25 m) – Women's 100 metre breaststroke =

Women's 100 metre breaststroke at the 2016 FINA World Swimming Championships (25 m)
- Venue: WFCU Centre
- Dates: 9 December (heats and semifinals); 10 December (final)
- Competitors: 60 from 46 nations
- Winning time: 1:03.03

Medalists
| gold medal | Alia Atkinson | Jamaica |
| silver medal | Lilly King | United States |
| bronze medal | Molly Hannis | United States |

The Women's 100 metre breaststroke competition of the 2016 FINA World Swimming Championships (25 m) was held on 9 and 10 December 2016.

== Records ==
Prior to the competition, the existing world and championship records were as follows.

| | Name | Nation | Time | Location | Date |
|---|---|---|---|---|---|
| World record | Rūta Meilutytė | Lithuania | 1:02.36 | Moscow | 12 October 2013 |
| Championship record | Alia Atkinson | Jamaica | 1:02.36 | Doha | 6 December 2014 |

== Results ==
=== Heats ===
The heats were held at 11:00.

| Rank | Heat | Lane | Name | Nationality | Time | Notes |
|---|---|---|---|---|---|---|
| 1 | 6 | 4 | Lilly King | United States | 1:04.05 | Q |
| 2 | 6 | 5 | Jenna Laukkanen | Finland | 1:04.76 | Q |
| 3 | 7 | 4 | Alia Atkinson | Jamaica | 1:05.27 | Q |
| 4 | 7 | 3 | Molly Renshaw | Great Britain | 1:05.44 | Q |
| 5 | 7 | 5 | Molly Hannis | United States | 1:05.52 | Q |
| 6 | 5 | 4 | Miho Teramura | Japan | 1:05.61 | Q |
| 7 | 7 | 7 | Silja Kansakoski | Finland | 1:05.67 | Q |
| 8 | 7 | 9 | Chloe Tutton | Great Britain | 1:05.76 | Q |
| 9 | 7 | 2 | Misaki Sekiguchi | Japan | 1:05.78 | Q |
| 10 | 5 | 3 | Jessica Hansen | Australia | 1:05.88 | Q |
| 11 | 6 | 6 | Natalia Ivaneeva | Russia | 1:05.89 | Q |
| 12 | 5 | 2 | Martina Carraro | Italy | 1:05.93 | Q |
| 13 | 4 | 4 | Fiona Doyle | Ireland | 1:05.95 | Q, NR |
| 14 | 5 | 7 | Hrafnhildur Lúthersdóttir | Iceland | 1:06.06 | Q, NR |
| 15 | 6 | 2 | Rachel Nicol | Canada | 1:06.10 | Q |
| 16 | 5 | 8 | Kierra Smith | Canada | 1:06.18 | Q |
| 17 | 6 | 3 | Shi Jinglin | China | 1:06.19 | |
| 18 | 7 | 1 | Andrea Podmaníková | Slovakia | 1:06.33 | |
| 19 | 5 | 5 | Fanny Lecluyse | Belgium | 1:06.44 | |
| 20 | 6 | 7 | Jessica Eriksson | Sweden | 1:06.54 | |
| 21 | 6 | 1 | Jessica Vall | Spain | 1:06.63 | |
| 22 | 6 | 0 | Martina Moravčíková | Czech Republic | 1:06.86 | |
| 23 | 7 | 6 | Sophie Hansson | Sweden | 1:07.00 | |
| 24 | 4 | 5 | Yu Jingyao | China | 1:07.42 | |
| 25 | 5 | 1 | Petra Chocová | Czech Republic | 1:07.61 | |
| 26 | 6 | 9 | Macarena Ceballos | Argentina | 1:07.64 | |
| 27 | 7 | 8 | Solene Gallego | France | 1:07.93 | |
| 28 | 6 | 8 | Matilde Schrøder | Denmark | 1:08.08 | |
| 29 | 4 | 2 | Susann Bjornsen | Norway | 1:08.11 | |
| 30 | 4 | 6 | Christina Nothdurfter | Austria | 1:08.47 | |
| 31 | 3 | 5 | Yeung Jamie Zhen Mei | Hong Kong | 1:08.56 | |
| 32 | 5 | 0 | Kaylene Corbett | South Africa | 1:08.73 | |
| 33 | 4 | 3 | Phiangkhwan Pawapotako | Thailand | 1:08.78 | NR |
| 34 | 4 | 9 | Liao Man-wen | Chinese Taipei | 1:08.91 | |
| 35 | 7 | 0 | Valentina Artemeva | Russia | 1:09.71 | |
| 36 | 4 | 0 | Hannah Taleb-Bendiab | Algeria | 1:10.17 | |
| 37 | 4 | 1 | Rebecca Kamau | Kenya | 1:10.22 | |
| 38 | 5 | 9 | Dariya Talanova | Kyrgyzstan | 1:10.34 | |
| 39 | 4 | 8 | Roanne Ho | Singapore | 1:11.38 | |
| 40 | 3 | 1 | Tilka Paljk | Zambia | 1:11.48 | NR |
| 41 | 3 | 3 | Emina Pašukan | Bosnia and Herzegovina | 1:11.57 | |
| 42 | 3 | 7 | Tatiana Chișca | Moldova | 1:11.60 | |
| 43 | 3 | 2 | Lei On Kei | Macau | 1:12.29 | |
| 44 | 4 | 7 | Leili Tilvaldyeva | Kyrgyzstan | 1:12.60 | |
| 45 | 3 | 0 | Sofia Lopez | Paraguay | 1:13.00 | |
| 46 | 3 | 8 | Chade Nersicio | Curaçao | 1:13.56 | NR |
| 47 | 2 | 4 | Izzy Joachim | Saint Vincent and the Grenadines | 1:14.25 | NR |
| 48 | 3 | 6 | Cheang Weng Lam | Macau | 1:15.00 | |
| 49 | 2 | 5 | Melisa Zhdrella | Kosovo | 1:16.30 | NR |
| 50 | 3 | 9 | Sophia Ortiz | Paraguay | 1:17.67 | |
| 51 | 1 | 5 | Mahfuza Khatun | Bangladesh | 1:18.76 | NR |
| 52 | 2 | 3 | Jang Myong-gyong | North Korea | 1:19.26 | |
| 53 | 2 | 6 | Tilali Scanlan | American Samoa | 1:19.54 | NR |
| 54 | 2 | 2 | Cecilia Medina | Honduras | 1:21.82 | |
| 55 | 1 | 4 | Colleen Furgeson | Marshall Islands | 1:22.93 | NR |
| 56 | 2 | 7 | Niharika Tuladhar | Nepal | 1:25.32 | NR |
| 57 | 2 | 1 | Kejsi Delli | Albania | 1:26.06 | |
| 58 | 2 | 8 | Anthea Mudanye | Uganda | 1:26.17 | |
| 59 | 1 | 3 | Ruthie Long | Marshall Islands | 1:32.40 | |
| | 3 | 4 | Samantha Yeo | Singapore | | DSQ |
| | 5 | 6 | Lena Kreundl | Austria | | DNS |

=== Semifinals ===
The semifinals were held at 20:09.

==== Semifinal 1 ====
| Rank | Lane | Name | Nationality | Time | Notes |
|---|---|---|---|---|---|
| 1 | 3 | Miho Teramura | Japan | 1:05.03 | Q |
| 2 | 4 | Jenna Laukkanen | Finland | 1:05.09 | Q |
| 3 | 6 | Chloe Tutton | Great Britain | 1:05.20 | Q, NR |
| 4 | 2 | Jessica Hansen | Australia | 1:05.29 | |
| 5 | 5 | Molly Renshaw | Great Britain | 1:05.35 | |
| 6 | 8 | Kierra Smith | Canada | 1:05.45 | |
| 7 | 1 | Hrafnhildur Lúthersdóttir | Iceland | 1:05.67 | NR |
| 8 | 7 | Martina Carraro | Italy | 1:06.09 | |

==== Semifinal 2 ====
| Rank | Lane | Name | Nationality | Time | Notes |
|---|---|---|---|---|---|
| 1 | 4 | Lilly King | United States | 1:04.06 | Q |
| 2 | 3 | Molly Hannis | United States | 1:04.50 | Q |
| 3 | 5 | Alia Atkinson | Jamaica | 1:04.72 | Q |
| 4 | 8 | Rachel Nicol | Canada | 1:05.15 | Q |
| 5 | 6 | Silja Kansakoski | Finland | 1:05.17 | Q |
| 6 | 7 | Natalia Ivaneeva | Russia | 1:05.31 | |
| 7 | 1 | Fiona Doyle | Ireland | 1:05.61 | NR |
| 8 | 2 | Misaki Sekiguchi | Japan | 1:05.94 | |

=== Final ===
The final was held at 20:06.

| Rank | Lane | Name | Nationality | Time | Notes |
|---|---|---|---|---|---|
| 1st place, gold medalist(s) | 3 | Alia Atkinson | Jamaica | 1:03.03 | |
| 2nd place, silver medalist(s) | 4 | Lilly King | United States | 1:03.35 | |
| 3rd place, bronze medalist(s) | 5 | Molly Hannis | United States | 1:03.89 | |
| 4 | 2 | Jenna Laukkanen | Finland | 1:04.62 | |
| 5 | 8 | Chloe Tutton | Great Britain | 1:04.79 | NR |
| 6 | 1 | Silja Kansakoski | Finland | 1:05.16 | |
| 7 | 6 | Miho Teramura | Japan | 1:05.23 | |
| 8 | 7 | Rachel Nicol | Canada | 1:05.48 | |
