= 2016 FINA World Swimming Championships (25 m) – Women's 50 metre breaststroke =

Women's 50 metre breaststroke at the 2016 FINA World Swimming Championships (25 m)
- Venue: WFCU Centre
- Dates: 6 December (heats and semifinals); 7 December (final)
- Competitors: 60 from 46 nations
- Winning time: 28.92

Medalists
gold medal	Lilly King	United States
silver medal	Alia Atkinson	Jamaica
bronze medal	Molly Hannis	United States

The Women's 50 metre breaststroke competition of the 2016 FINA World Swimming Championships (25 m) was held on 6 and 7 December 2016.

== Records ==
Prior to the competition, the existing world and championship records were as follows.

	Name	Nation	Time	Location	Date
World record	Alia Atkinson	Jamaica	28.64	Tokyo	26 October 2016
Championship record	Rūta Meilutytė	Lithuania	28.81	Doha	3 December 2014

== Results ==
=== Heats ===
The heats were held at 11:12.

Rank	Heat	Lane	Name	Nationality	Time	Notes
1	7	4	Alia Atkinson	Jamaica	29.48	Q
2	7	5	Jenna Laukkanen	Finland	29.71	Q, =NR
3	6	4	Lilly King	United States	29.84	Q
4	5	4	Molly Hannis	United States	29.92	Q
5	6	5	Fanny Lecluyse	Belgium	30.06	Q
6	5	5	Natalia Ivaneeva	Russia	30.23	Q
7	5	3	Miho Teramura	Japan	30.27	Q
8	7	1	Jessica Hansen	Australia	30.35	Q
9	5	6	Susan Bjornsen	Norway	30.41	Q
10	7	6	Martina Carraro	Italy	30.43	Q
11	5	2	Rachel Nicol	Canada	30.52	Q
11	7	3	Sophie Hansson	Sweden	30.52	Q
13	6	3	Valentina Artemyeva	Russia	30.55	Q
14	5	1	Misaki Sekiguchi	Japan	30.61	Q
15	7	2	Hrafnhildur Lúthersdóttir	Iceland	30.64	Q, NR
16	5	0	Silja Kansakoski	Finland	30.70	Q
17	4	5	Fiona Doyle	Ireland	30.77	
18	6	6	Petra Chocová	Czech Republic	30.89	
19	7	7	Jessica Eriksson	Sweden	30.92	
20	6	1	Shi Jinglin	China	30.99	
20	7	8	Andrea Podmaníková	Slovakia	30.99	NR
22	5	7	Macarena Ceballos	Argentina	31.01	NR
23	7	0	Martina Moravčíková	Czech Republic	31.05	
24	6	2	Lena Kreundl	Austria	31.07	
25	6	8	Solene Gallego	France	31.13	
26	5	9	Jessica Vall	Spain	31.17	
26	6	7	Christina Nothdurfter	Austria	31.17	
28	4	6	Kierra Smith	Canada	31.25	
29	5	8	Kaylene Corbett	South Africa	31.55	
30	7	9	Matilde Schroder	Denmark	31.71	
31	4	4	Yu Jingyao	China	31.80	
32	6	9	Tatiana Chișca	Moldova	31.81	
33	4	7	Jenjira Srisa-Ard	Thailand	32.07	NR
34	4	1	Liao Man-Wen	Chinese Taipei	32.18	
35	4	0	Tilka Paljk	Zambia	32.29	NR
36	4	3	Roanne Ho	Singapore	32.40	
37	3	4	Izzy Shne Joachim	Saint Vincent and the Grenadines	32.43	NR
38	4	2	Hannah Taleb-Bendiab	Algeria	32.75	
39	4	8	Emina Pasukan	Bosnia and Herzegovina	32.81	
40	6	0	Lei On Kei	Macau	33.29	
41	4	9	Leili Tilvadyeva	Kyrgyzstan	33.38	
42	3	5	Chade Nersicio	Curaçao	33.51	NR
43	3	1	Cheang Weng Lam	Macau	33.55	
44	3	7	Hamida Nefsi	Algeria	33.71	
45	3	0	Melisa Zhdrella	Kosovo	34.00	NR
46	3	2	Sofia Lopez	Paraguay	34.07	NR
47	3	3	Naomy Grand-Pierre	Haiti	34.22	
48	3	6	Sophia Ortiz	Paraguay	34.76	
49	1	5	Mahfuza Khatun	Bangladesh	35.30	NR
50	3	9	Tilali Scanlan	American Samoa	35.34	NR
51	2	7	Colleen Furgeson	Marshall Islands	35.37	NR
52	3	8	Jang Myong Gyong	North Korea	35.78	
53	2	3	Tiareth Cijntje	Curaçao	36.08	
54	2	5	Cecilia Medina	Honduras	37.04	NR
55	2	2	Niharika Tuladhar	Nepal	37.94	NR
56	2	6	Kejsi Delli	Albania	38.65	
57	2	8	Annie Hepler	Marshall Islands	38.85	
58	2	0	Anthea Mudanye	Uganda	40.48	
59	2	4	Angel de Jesus	Northern Mariana Islands	41.15	NR
60	2	9	Tayamika Chang'anamuno	Malawi	44.13	NR
	1	3	Angelika Ouedraogo	Burkina Faso		DNS
	1	4	Bunturabie Jalloh	Sierra Leone		DNS
	1	6	Laila Zangwio	Ghana		DNS
	2	1	Nazlati Mohamed Andhumdine	Comoros		DNS

=== Semifinals ===
The semifinals were held at 18:56.

==== Semifinal 1 ====
Rank	Lane	Name	Nationality	Time	Notes
1	5	Molly Hannis	United States	29.88	Q
2	4	Jenna Laukkanen	Finland	30.06	Q
3	6	Jessica Hansen	Australia	30.22	Q
4	3	Natalia Ivaneeva	Russia	30.30	Q
5	8	Silja Kansakoski	Finland	30.39	
6	2	Martina Carraro	Italy	30.43	
7	7	Sophie Hansson	Sweden	30.70	
8	1	Misaki Sekiguchi	Japan	30.80	

==== Semifinal 2 ====
Rank	Lane	Name	Nationality	Time	Notes
1	4	Alia Atkinson	Jamaica	29.09	Q
2	5	Lilly King	United States	29.17	Q, NR
3	3	Fanny Lecluyse	Belgium	30.17	Q
4	2	Susan Bjornsen	Norway	30.33	Q
5	6	Miho Teramura	Japan	30.35	
6	7	Rachel Nicol	Canada	30.38	
7	8	Hrafnhildur Lúthersdóttir	Iceland	30.47	NR
8	1	Valentina Artemyeva	Russia	30.49	

=== Final ===
The final was held at 19:11.

Rank	Lane	Name	Nationality	Time	Notes
1st place, gold medalist(s)	5	Lilly King	United States	28.92	NR
2nd place, silver medalist(s)	4	Alia Atkinson	Jamaica	29.11	
3rd place, bronze medalist(s)	3	Molly Hannis	United States	29.58	
4	6	Jenna Laukkanen	Finland	29.72	
5	1	Natalia Ivaneeva	Russia	30.14	
6	8	Susan Bjornsen	Norway	30.28	
7	7	Jessica Hansen	Australia	30.43	
8	2	Fanny Lecluyse	Belgium	30.45	
