= Swimming at the 2014 European Aquatics Championships – Women's 4 × 100 metre medley relay =

Swimming competition

Women's 4 × 100 metre medley relay at the Swimming at the 2014 European Aquatics Championships
- Dates: 24 August
- Competitors: 64 from 14 nations
- Winning time: 3:55.62

Medalists
gold medal	Mie Nielsen; Rikke Møller Pedersen; Jeanette Ottesen; Pernille Blume	Denmark
silver medal	Ida Lindborg; Jennie Johansson; Sarah Sjöström; Michelle Coleman; Louise Hansson	Sweden
bronze medal	Georgia Davies; Sophie Taylor; Jemma Lowe; Francesca Halsall; Elizabeth Simmonds; Rebecca Turner	Great Britain

The Women's 4 × 100 metre medley relay competition of the 2014 European Aquatics Championships was held on 24 August.

== Records ==
Prior to the competition, the existing world, European and championship records were as follows.

	Nation	Time	Location	Date
World record	United States	3:52.05	London	4 August 2012
European record	Germany	3:55.79	Rome	1 August 2009
Championship record	Germany	3:58.43	Debrecen	27 May 2012

== Results ==
=== Heats ===
The heats were held at 10:09.

Rank	Heat	Lane	Nationality	Swimmers	Time	Notes
1	1	3	Denmark	Mie Nielsen (1:00.43); Rikke Møller Pedersen (1:06.37); Jeanette Ottesen (59.10); Pernille Blume (53.92)	3:59.82	Q
2	1	4	Netherlands	Wendy van den Zanden (1:02.89); Moniek Nijhuis (1:07.51); Inge Dekker (57.40); Femke Heemskerk (53.48)	4:01.28	Q
3	1	5	Sweden	Ida Lindborg (1:01.31); Jennie Johansson (1:06.89); Louise Hansson (1:00.09); Michelle Coleman (53.54)	4:01.83	Q
4	2	6	Great Britain	Elizabeth Simmonds (1:00.92); Sophie Taylor (1:08.05); Jemma Lowe (58.50); Rebecca Turner (55.56)	4:03.03	Q
5	2	7	Italy	Arianna Barbieri (1:02.06); Giulia De Ascentis (1:08.87); Elena Di Liddo (58.32); Erika Ferraioli (54.40)	4:03.65	Q
6	2	4	Ukraine	Daryna Zevina (1:01.97); Mariya Liver (1:07.52); Lyubov Korol (59.68); Darya Stepanyuk (54.94)	4:04.11	Q
7	2	3	Spain	Duane Da Rocha (1:00.88); Jessica Vall (1:08.23); Judit Ignacio (59.55); Fatima Gallardo (55.57)	4:04.23	Q
8	2	2	Russia	Daria Ustinova (1:01.06); Maria Astashkina (1:08.62); Svetlana Chimrova (59.81); Margarita Nesterova (55.05)	4:04.54	Q
9	1	2	Germany	Lisa Graf (1:01.73); Vanessa Grimberg (1:09.19); Alexandra Wenk (58.97); Annika Bruhn (54.92)	4:04.81	
10	1	6	France	Mathilde Cini (1:02.37); Coralie Dobral (1:09.17); Marie Wattel (59.59); Charlotte Bonnet (55.06)	4:06.19	
11	2	1	Czech Republic	Simona Baumrtová (1:01.04); Martina Moravcikova (1:08.45); Barbora Závadová (1:00.93); Anna Kolářová (56.48)	4:06.90	
12	1	7	Belgium	Maaike Ramael (1:04.38); Fanny Lecluyse (1:08.67); Kimberly Buys (58.08); Jolien Sysmans (55.94)	4:07.07	
13	2	5	Finland	Mimosa Jallow (1:02.56); Jenna Laukkanen (1:09.18); Tanja Kylliäinen (1:01.55); Hanna-Maria Seppälä (55.19)	4:08.48	
14	1	1	Serbia	Andrea Basaraba (1:07.78); Jovana Bogdanović (1:16.72); Katarina Simonović (1:04.91); Miroslava Najdanovski (57.60)	4:27.01	

=== Final ===
The final was held at 16:55.

Rank	Lane	Nationality	Swimmers	Time	Notes
1st place, gold medalist(s)	4	Denmark	Mie Nielsen (1:00.37); Rikke Møller Pedersen (1:06.07); Jeanette Ottesen (56.15); Pernille Blume (53.03)	3:55.62	ER, CR
2nd place, silver medalist(s)	3	Sweden	Ida Lindborg (1:01.25); Jennie Johansson (1:06.28); Sarah Sjöström (55.47); Michelle Coleman (53.04)	3:56.04	
3rd place, bronze medalist(s)	6	Great Britain	Georgia Davies (1:00.00); Sophie Taylor (1:06.97); Jemma Lowe (57.97); Francesca Halsall (53.03)	3:57.97	
4	5	Netherlands	Wendy van den Zanden (1:02.31); Moniek Nijhuis (1:06.70); Inge Dekker (56.92); Femke Heemskerk (52.40)	3:58.33	
5	2	Italy	Carlotta Zofkova (1:00.65); Arianna Castiglioni (1:07.31); Ilaria Bianchi (57.60); Erika Ferraioli (54.06)	3:59.62	
6	8	Russia	Daria Ustinova (1:00.85); Vitalina Simonova (1:07.81); Svetlana Chimrova (59.00); Veronika Popova (53.90)	4:01.56	
7	1	Spain	Duane Da Rocha (1:00.58); Jessica Vall (1:07.36); Judit Ignacio (1:00.11); Fatima Gallardo (54.79)	4:02.84	
8	7	Ukraine	Daryna Zevina (1:01.96); Mariya Liver (1:07.13); Lyubov Korol (1:00.01); Darya Stepanyuk (55.34)	4:04.44	
