= Swimming at the 2016 European Aquatics Championships – Women's 4 × 100 metre medley relay =

Women's 4 × 100 metre medley relay at the 2016 European Aquatics Championships
- Dates: 22 May
- Competitors: 61 from 14 nations
- Teams: 14

Medalists
| gold medal | Kathleen Dawson; Chloe Tutton; Siobhan-Marie O'Connor; Francesca Halsall | Great Britain |
| silver medal | Carlotta Zofkova; Martina Carraro; Ilaria Bianchi; Erika Ferraioli | Italy |
| bronze medal | Mimosa Jallow; Jenna Laukkanen; Emilia Pikkarainen; Hanna-Maria Seppälä | Finland |

The Women's 4 × 100 metre medley relay competition of the 2016 European Aquatics Championships was held on 22 May 2016.

== Records ==
Prior to the competition, the existing world, European and championship records were as follows.

| | Nation | Time | Location | Date |
|---|---|---|---|---|
| World record | United States | 3:52.05 | London | 4 August 2012 |
| European record | Sweden | 3:55.24 | Kazan | 9 August 2015 |
| Championship record | Denmark | 3:55.62 | Berlin | 24 August 2014 |

== Results ==
=== Heats ===
The heats were held at 09:59.

| Rank | Heat | Lane | Nation | Swimmers | Time | Notes |
|---|---|---|---|---|---|---|
| 1 | 1 | 8 | Sweden | Ida Lindborg (1:01.54); Jennie Johansson (1:06.11); Stina Gardell (59.89); Louise Hansson (55.45) | 4:02.99 | Q |
| 2 | 1 | 4 | Finland | Mimosa Jallow (1:01.21); Jenna Laukkanen (1:06.85); Emilia Pikkarainen (59.78); Hanna-Maria Seppälä (55.56) | 4:03.40 | Q |
| 3 | 1 | 5 | Italy | Carlotta Zofkova (1:01.17); Arianna Castiglioni (1:08.35); Ilaria Bianchi (59.07); Erika Ferraioli (54.90) | 4:03.49 | Q |
| 4 | 1 | 2 | Great Britain | Georgia Davies (1:00.51); Molly Renshaw (1:08.77); Laura Stephens (59.15); Harriet Cooper (55.10) | 4:03.53 | Q |
| 5 | 2 | 3 | Czech Republic | Simona Baumrtová (1:01.20); Martina Moravčíková (1:07.71); Lucie Svěcená (58.86); Anna Kolařová (56.13) | 4:04.25 | Q |
| 6 | 2 | 2 | Poland | Alicja Tchórz (1:01.16); Dominika Sztandera (1:09.28); Anna Dowgiert (59.15); Aleksandra Urbańczyk (55.87) | 4:05.46 | Q |
| 7 | 2 | 8 | Belgium | Jade Smits (1:04.55); Fanny Lecluyse (1:07.71); Kimberly Buys (58.25); Lotte Goris (55.66) | 4:06.17 | Q |
| 8 | 1 | 7 | Iceland | Eygló Ósk Gústafsdóttir (1:00.96); Hrafnhildur Lúthersdóttir (1:06.51); Jóhanna Gústafsdóttir (1:03.12); Bryndís Hansen (55.78) | 4:06.37 | Q |
| 9 | 2 | 7 | Turkey | Ekaterina Avramova (1:01.24); Viktoriya Zeynep Güneş (1:08.29); Gizem Bozkurt (1:01.14); Ilknur Nihan Cakici (55.87) | 4:06.54 | |
| 10 | 1 | 1 | Slovakia | Katarína Listopadová (1:01.69); Andrea Podmaníková (1:10.37); Barbora Misendová (1:00.79); Miroslava Syllabová (55.83) | 4:08.68 | |
| 11 | 2 | 6 | Switzerland | Martina van Berkel (1:04.15); Lisa Mamie (1:10.82); Maria Ugolkova (58.95); Noemi Girardet (55.29) | 4:09.21 | |
| 12 | 1 | 3 | Austria | Caroline Pilhatsch (1:02.25); Lena Kreundl (1:11.57); Birgit Koschischek (59.15); Lisa Zaiser (56.15) | 4:09.42 | |
| 13 | 2 | 5 | Hungary | Kata Burián (1:03.14); Dalma Sebestyén (1:09.09); Adél Juhász (1:02.35); Réka György (57.47) | 4:12.05 | |
| 14 | 2 | 4 | Portugal | Francisca Gomes Azevedo (1:04.66); Ana Pinho Rodrigues (1:10.32); Ana Catarina Monteiro (1:00.39); Ana Sofia Leite (58.46) | 4:13.83 | |
| | 2 | 1 | France | DNS | | |
| | 1 | 6 | Israel | DNS | | |

=== Final ===
The final was held on 22 May at 17:06.

| Rank | Lane | Nation | Swimmers | Time | Notes |
|---|---|---|---|---|---|
| 1st place, gold medalist(s) | 6 | Great Britain | Kathleen Dawson (59.82); Chloe Tutton (1:06.94); Siobhan-Marie O'Connor (57.69); Francesca Halsall (54.12) | 3:58.57 | |
| 2nd place, silver medalist(s) | 3 | Italy | Carlotta Zofkova (1:01.07); Martina Carraro (1:07.18); Ilaria Bianchi (58.36); Erika Ferraioli (54.12) | 4:00.73 | |
| 3rd place, bronze medalist(s) | 5 | Finland | Mimosa Jallow (1:00.42); Jenna Laukkanen (1:06.42); Emilia Pikkarainen (59.56); Hanna-Maria Seppälä (55.09) | 4:01.49 | |
| 4 | 2 | Czech Republic | Simona Baumrtová (1:01.34); Martina Moravčíková (1:07.65); Lucie Svěcená (58.27); Anna Kolařová (55.47) | 4:02.73 | |
| 5 | 4 | Sweden | Ida Lindborg (1:02.06); Jennie Johansson (1:06.50); Stina Gardell (59.77); Louise Hansson (54.98) | 4:03.31 | |
| 6 | 8 | Iceland | Eygló Ósk Gústafsdóttir (1:01.14); Hrafnhildur Lúthersdóttir (1:06.21); Bryndís Hansen (1:00.09); Jóhanna Gústafsdóttir (57.62) | 4:05.06 | |
| 7 | 1 | Belgium | Jade Smits (1:04.34); Fanny Lecluyse (1:07.38); Kimberly Buys (58.06); Lotte Goris (55.45) | 4:05.23 | |
| 8 | 7 | Poland | Alicja Tchórz (1:01.88); Dominika Sztandera (1:10.21); Anna Dowgiert (58.77); Aleksandra Urbańczyk (55.96) | 4:06.82 | |
