= Amira Kouza =

Algerian swimmer (born 1989)

Personal information
- Born: August 13, 1989 (age 36)

Sport
- Sport: Swimming
Medal record
Representing Algeria
African Games
| Silver medal – second place | 2007 Algiers | 50m breaststroke |
| Bronze medal – third place | 2007 Algiers | 4x100m medley relay |
Islamic Solidarity Games
| Bronze medal – third place | 2013 Palembang | 50m breaststroke |

Radja Amira Kouza (born 13 August 1989) is an Algerian breaststroke swimmer and triathlete. She won silver at the 2007 All-Africa Games in 50m Breaststroke and bronze in the 4 × 100 m Medley relay.

== Career ==
Kouza holds several national records in swimming. In 2006, at the age of 17, she competed at the Nantes Natacion in Nantes, France where her recorded time in the breastroke events are still records for Algerian female competitors in French swimming events. In 2007, she swam a time of 2:35.80 in the 200m breaststroke at the Algeria 25m Championships. In 2014, she competed at the 2014 World Short Course Swimming Championships in Doha, where she broke national records in the 50m breaststroke with a time of 32.38 and 100m breaststroke with a time of 1:10.01. Yet the times were not fast enough to proceed, and she finished 43rd in the 50m breaststroke and 41st in the 100m.

In April 2008, Koura competed in the Telkom SA Senior National Championships at King's Park Aquatic Centre in Durban. She won bronze in the 50m breaststroke with a time of 33.52, behind Suzaan van Biljon of South Africa who took gold and Tasmynne Roe of South Africa who took silver.

In 2013, Kouza won a bronze medal in the 50m breastroke at the Islamic Solidarity Games in Palembang, Indonesia. She finished with a time of 33.77, behind Christina Loh Yen Ling who took gold with a time of, 33.23 and the Mostafa May of Egypt who won silver with a time of 33.27.

Amira Kouza has more recently been competing in triathlons. She finished 10th in the 2015 Pescara Mediterranean Beach Games in September 2015.
