= Moniek Nijhuis =

Dutch swimmer (born 1988)

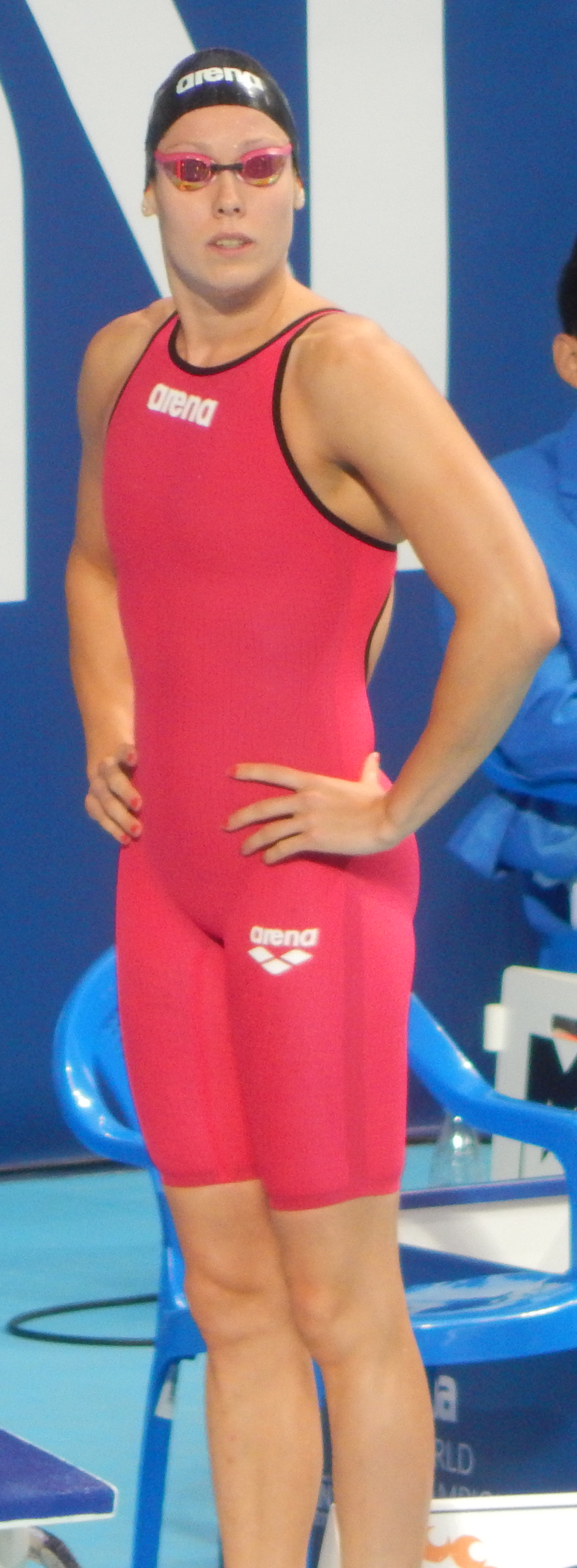

Personal information
- Nationality: Dutch
- Born: 20 March 1988 (age 38) Overdinkel, Netherlands
- Height: 1.78 m (5 ft 10 in)
- Weight: 66 kg (146 lb)

Sport
- Sport: Swimming
- Strokes: Breaststroke
- Club: De Dolfijn
Medal record
World Championships (SC)
Bronze medal – third place	2014 Doha	50 m breaststroke
Bronze medal – third place	2014 Doha	100 m breaststroke
European Championships
Bronze medal – third place	2014 Berlin	50 m breaststroke
European Championships (SC)
Gold medal – first place	2004 Vienna	4×50 m medley
Gold medal – first place	2005 Triëste	4×50 m medley
Gold medal – first place	2008 Rijeka	4×50 m medley
Gold medal – first place	2009 Istanbul	4×50 m medley
Gold medal – first place	2009 Istanbul	50 m breaststroke
Gold medal – first place	2010 Eindhoven	100 m breaststroke
Gold medal – first place	2010 Eindhoven	4×50 m medley
Gold medal – first place	2015 Netanya	4×50 m medley
Silver medal – second place	2009 Istanbul	100 m breaststroke
Silver medal – second place	2010 Eindhoven	50 m breaststroke
Silver medal – second place	2015 Netanya	100 m breaststroke
Bronze medal – third place	2003 Dublin	4×50 m medley
Bronze medal – third place	2008 Rijeka	50 m breaststroke
Bronze medal – third place	2013 Herning	50 m breaststroke

Moniek Nijhuis (born 20 March 1988) is a Dutch swimmer who specializes in breaststroke. After she had been a professional swimmer, under the guidance of Martin Truijens, for several years she took a break from professional swimming after she missed out on the Dutch team for the 2008 Summer Olympics. She wanted to concentrate more on her studies and train less. She still swims at De Dolfijn swimming club in Amsterdam.

== Swimming career ==
After she won the bronze medal in the 50 m breaststroke at the European Junior Swimming Championships 2003 in Glasgow, Scotland. Nijhuis took part in the European Short Course Swimming Championships 2003 in Dublin, Ireland where she won a bronze medal in the 4×50 m medley alongside Hinkelien Schreuder, Chantal Groot and Marleen Veldhuis. At the European Junior Swimming Championships 2004 in Lisbon, Portugal she won two gold medals in the 50 m, breaking the national record of Madelon Baans, and 100 m breaststroke. In December at the European Short Course Swimming Championships 2004 in Vienna, Austria she won a gold medal in the 4×50 m medley together with Schreuder, Dekker and Veldhuis breaking the world record.

=== 2005/2006 ===
In 2005 Nijhuis qualified for the 2005 World Aquatics Championships in Montreal Canada. She ended 13th in the 50 m breaststroke, the only distance she swam. During the European Short Course Swimming Championships 2005 in Triest, Italy she once again broke the world record in the 4×50 m medley, with the same team as the year before. Individually she ended 7th in the 50 m breaststroke.

Nijhuis then travelled to Budapest, Hungary for the 2006 European Aquatics Championships. There she ended 6th in the 50 m breaststroke and 25th in the 100 m. With the 4 × 100 m medley team she ended 5th alongside Hinkelien Schreuder, Inge Dekker and Marleen Veldhuis. At the European Short Course Swimming Championships 2006 in Helsinki, Finland she finished 4th in the 50 m breaststroke and 11th in the 100 m breaststroke.

=== 2007/2008 ===
After she failed to qualify for the 2007 World Aquatics Championships, Nijhuis bettered the national record in the 50 m and 100 m breaststroke at the Long Course and the 100 m breaststroke at the short course. The European Short Course Swimming Championships 2007 were a big disappointment when she didn't reached any final.

Nijhuis competed at the 2008 European Aquatics Championships in Eindhoven in her home country. She failed to qualify for the 2008 Summer Olympics when she performed disappointingly in the 100 m breaststroke. In the 50 m breaststroke she ended 6th in the final after she swam a national record in the semifinal. A few weeks after this championships Nijhuis announced that she would make a step back in her career focusing more on her study and put less hours in her swimming career.

=== 2008/2009 season ===
Nijhuis broke the national record in the 50 m and 100 m breaststroke (SC) in Aachen at an early season meet. At the Swim Cup Eindhoven 2008 she lowered the national record in the 50 m breaststroke (LC). The week afterwards she took part in the European Short Course Swimming Championships 2008 in Rijeka, Croatia. There she won her first individual medal, bronze, in the 50 m breaststroke and also reached a 6th place in the 100 m breaststroke, in both events she lowered her own national record. In the 4×50 m medley she won a gold medal alongside Ranomi Kromowidjojo, Hinkelien Schreuder and Marleen Veldhuis equalling the world record that was set by Australia.

2012 Olympics

She competed in the 100 m breaststroke and the 4 × 100 m medley relay at the 2012 Summer Olympics.

== Personal bests ==
Short course
Event	Time	Date	Location
50 m breaststroke	NR 29.62	2014-12-03	Doha, Qatar
100 m breaststroke	NR 1:03.96	2014-12-05	Doha, Qatar
200 m breaststroke	NR 2:21.16	2014-12-07	Doha, Qatar

Long course
Event	Time	Date	Location
50 m breaststroke	NR 30.38	2009-08-01	Rome, Italy
100 m breaststroke	NR 1:07.18	2015-04-03	Eindhoven, Netherlands
200 m breaststroke	2:29.61	2015-04-05	Eindhoven, Netherlands

== See also ==
- Dutch records in swimming
- List of swimmers
