= Jennie Johansson =

Swedish swimmer (born 1988)

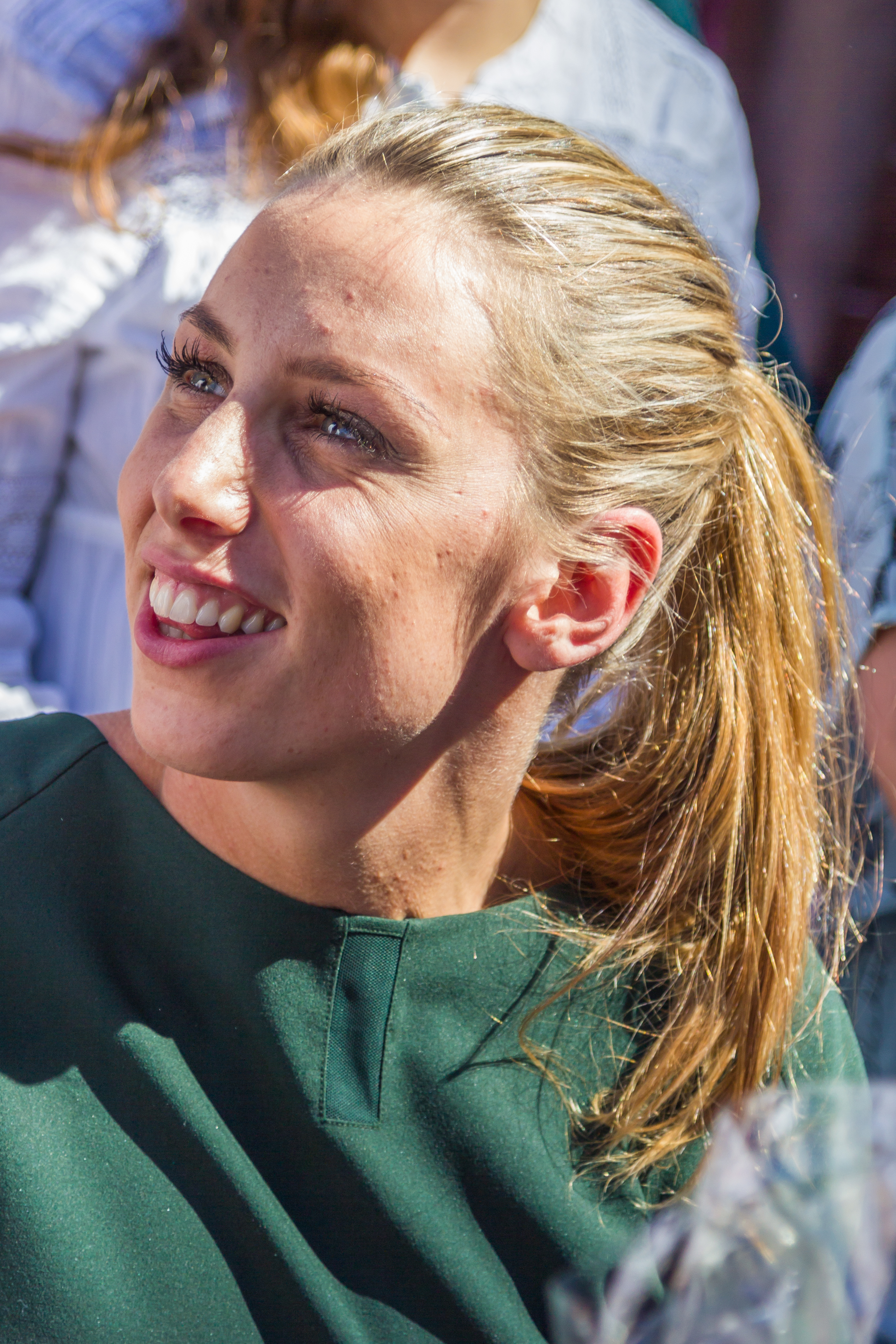
- Johansson in 2015

Personal information
- Full name: Jennie Caroline Eleonore Johansson
- National team: Sweden
- Born: 15 June 1988 (age 38) Hedemora, Sweden
- Height: 1.85 m (6 ft 1 in)
- Weight: 72 kg (159 lb)

Sport
- Sport: Swimming
- Strokes: Breaststroke, medley
- Club: Uppsala SS
Medal record
Women's swimming
Representing Sweden
World Championships (LC)
Gold medal – first place	2015 Kazan	50 m breaststroke
Silver medal – second place	2015 Kazan	4×100 m medley
European Championships (LC)
Gold medal – first place	2016 London	50 m breaststroke
Silver medal – second place	2010 Budapest	100 m breaststroke
Silver medal – second place	2012 Debrecen	100 m breaststroke
Silver medal – second place	2014 Berlin	50 m breaststroke
Silver medal – second place	2014 Berlin	100 m breaststroke
Silver medal – second place	2014 Berlin	4×100 m medley
Bronze medal – third place	2010 Budapest	50 m breaststroke
European Championships (SC)
Silver medal – second place	2013 Herning	4×50 m medley
Bronze medal – third place	2009 Istanbul	100 m breaststroke
Bronze medal – third place	2013 Herning	50 m breaststroke
Bronze medal – third place	2013 Herning	100 m breaststroke

Jennie Caroline Eleonore Johansson (born 15 June 1988) is a Swedish former Olympic swimmer and former European record holder in 4 × 100 metre medley relay, who competed at the 2012 and 2016 Summer Olympics.

Johansson has represented Upsala SS and SK Neptun.

== Career ==
Johansson competed for Sweden at the 2012 Summer Olympics. She won gold in the 50 metre breaststroke at the 2015 World Aquatics Championships in Kazan, Russia.

Jennie Johansson competed in 2016 Summer Olympics in Rio de Janeiro, where she participated in the 100 m breaststroke and 4 × 100 m medley relay events, but she did not reach the finals.

In November 2016, it was revealed that Jennie Johansson and fellow Swedish swimmer Michelle Coleman had been barred from participating in international events representing Sweden, due to disciplinary reasons. They were still entitled to use national team training facilities.

In March 2017, Jennie Johansson competed in the Edinburgh International Swim Meet and won the 100 m breaststroke event with a time of 1:07.43. She also won the 50 m breaststroke silver with a time of 31.30.

Jennie Johansson competed in the 2017 Stockholm Swim Cup in the 50 m breaststroke event which she won the prelims with a time of 30.39, setting a world lead. In the finals she clocked a time of 30.57 and won gold medal in Eriksdalsbadet. In the 100 m breaststroke event, she won the first place with a time of 1:06.30 which is a new Swedish record and personal best.

Johansson publicly announced her retirement from the sport in March 2018.
