= Martina Carraro =

Italian swimmer (born 1993)

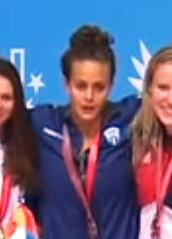
- Carraro on 2015 Summer Universiade podium of the 50 m breaststroke in Gwangju.

Personal information
- Nationality: Italian
- Born: 21 June 1993 (age 33) Genoa, Italy

Sport
- Sport: Swimming
- Strokes: Breaststroke
- Club: Fiamme Azzurre
Medal record
Women's swimming
Representing Italy
Event	1st	2nd	3rd
World Championships (LC)	0	0	1
World Championships (SC)	0	1	2
European Championships (LC)	0	3	2
European Championships (SC)	1	1	2
Universiade	0	0	1
Mediterranean Games	0	1	0
Total	1	6	8
World Championships (LC)
Bronze medal – third place	2019 Gwangju	100 m breaststroke
World Championships (SC)
Silver medal – second place	2016 Windsor	4×50 m medley
Bronze medal – third place	2018 Hangzhou	50 m breaststroke
Bronze medal – third place	2018 Hangzhou	4×100 m medley
European Championships (LC)
Silver medal – second place	2016 London	4×100 m medley
Silver medal – second place	2016 London	4×100 m mixed medley
Silver medal – second place	2022 Rome	200 m breaststroke
Bronze medal – third place	2020 Budapest	100 m breaststroke
Bronze medal – third place	2020 Budapest	4×100 m medley
European Championships (SC)
Gold medal – first place	2019 Glasgow	100 m breaststroke
Silver medal – second place	2019 Glasgow	50 m breaststroke
Bronze medal – third place	2019 Glasgow	200 m breaststroke
Bronze medal – third place	2015 Netanya	4×50 m medley
Youth level
Summer Youth Olympics
Silver medal – second place	2010 Singapore	50 m breaststroke

Martina Carraro (born 21 June 1993) is an Italian swimmer. She competed at the 2020 Summer Olympics, in 100 m breaststroke and 200 m breaststroke. She was European champion in short course in the 100 m breaststroke at the 2019 European Short Course Swimming Championships in Glasgow, Scotland.

== Career ==
=== 2012–2018 ===
In 2012, Carraro moved to Bologna, joining the Swimming Club Azzurra 1991 led by the coach Fabrizio Bastelli. On 9 July 2015, at the 2015 Gwangju Universiade, he sets the Italian record in the long course on 50 meters breaststroke, with a time of 30.89 in the semifinal, improving his previous record of 31.00 set in Rome during the Seven Trophy Colli 2015. Subsequently, she still improves this record during the 2015 Kazan World Championships in heats with a time of 30.83, a record that will be later broken by Arianna Castiglioni.

In 2016 she enlisted in the Fiamme Azzurre Sports Group, than competed in the women's 100 metre breaststroke event at the 2016 Summer Olympics.

=== 2019–present ===
On 23 July 2019, at the Gwangju World Championships, she won the bronze in the 100 meters, with a time of 1:06.36, behind the American Lilly King and the Russian Julija Efimova. In 2020 she qualified to represent Italy at the 2020 Summer Olympics. In 2021, she won two bronze medals with the relay team at the Swimming European Championships Hungary 2020.

At the 2022 European Aquatics Championships, held in Rome, she won the silver medal in the 200 metre breaststroke with a time of 2:23.64, finishing 0.37 seconds behind gold medalist Lisa Mamié of Switzerland.

== See also ==
- 50 m breaststroke - Women long course all-time top 25
