= Ilaria Scarcella =

Italian swimmer (born 1993)

Personal information
- National team: Italy
- Born: 6 July 1993 (age 32) Genoa, Italy

Sport
- Sport: Swimming
- Strokes: Breaststroke
- Club: Nuotatori Rivarolesi (2001-2009); G.S. Fiamme Gialle (2010-2016); G.S. Fiamme Oro (2017- )
Medal record
Universiade
Gold medal – first place	2015 Gwangju	4×100 m medley
European Junior Championships
Gold medal – first place	2009 Prague	50 m breaststroke
Gold medal – first place	2009 Prague	100 m breaststroke
Gold medal – first place	2009 Prague	200 m breaststroke
Silver medal – second place	2009 Prague	4×100 m medley

Ilaria Scarcella (born 6 July 1993) is an Italian swimmer who competed at the 2009 World Aquatics Championships and won a silver medal at senior level with the national team at the 2015 Summer Universiade.

== Biography ==
Scarcella was initially an athlete of Nuotatori Rivarolesi. Then, she was a member of another Italian military sports body, the Gruppo Sportivo Fiamme Oro, from 2010 to 2016.

== National titles ==
She won two national championships at the individual senior level:

- Italian Swimming Championships
  - 100 m breaststroke: 2009
  - 200 m breaststroke: 2009

== See also ==
- Italy at the 2015 World Aquatics Championships
