= Vanessa Grimberg =

German swimmer

Personal information
- National team: Germany
- Born: 28 January 1993 (age 33)
- Height: 176 cm (5 ft 9 in)
- Weight: 63 kg (139 lb)

Sport
- Sport: Swimming

Vanessa Grimberg (born 28 January 1993) is a German swimmer. At the 2016 Summer Olympics in Rio de Janeiro, she competed as a member of Germany's women's 4 x 100 metre medley relay team. The team finished 12th in the heats and did not qualify for the final.
