= Natalia Ivaneeva =

Russian swimmer

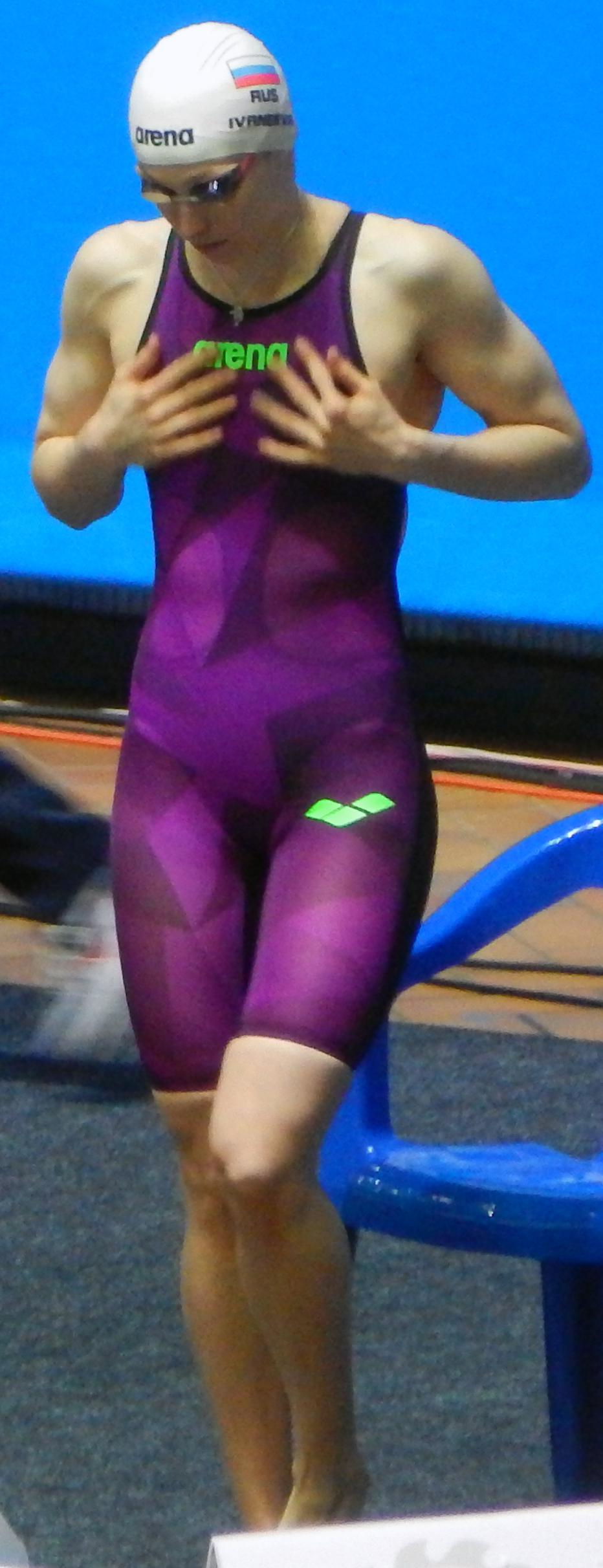
- 2018 Russian National Championships

Personal information
- Born: 9 February 1990 (age 36)

Sport
- Sport: Swimming
Medal record
Women's swimming
Representing Russia
World Championships (LC)
Silver medal – second place	2017 Budapest	4×100 m medley
European Championships (SC)
Bronze medal – third place	2015 Netanya	50 m breaststroke

Natalia Ivaneeva (born 9 February 1990) is a Russian swimmer. She competed in the women's 100 metre breaststroke event at the 2017 World Aquatics Championships.
