= Alina Bulmag =

Moldovan swimmer (born 1995)

Personal information
- Born: 6 September 1995 (age 30)

Sport
- Sport: Swimming

Alina Bulmag (born 6 September 1995) is a Moldovan swimmer. She competed in the women's 100 metre breaststroke event at the 2017 World Aquatics Championships.
