= Maria Harutjunjan =

Estonian swimmer

Personal information
- Born: September 17, 1995 (age 30) Tartu, Estonia
- Education: Audentes Sports Gymnasium; Wyoming University

Sport
- Sport: Swimming

Maria Harutjunjan (born 17 September 1995) is an Estonian swimmer.

She was born in Tartu. In 2014 she graduated from Audentes Sports Gymnasium in Tallinn, and 2019 Wyoming University in USA.

She began her swimming career in 2002, coached by Mihhail Krupnin. She is multiple-times Estonian champion in different swimming disciplines. 2010–2018 she was a member of Estonian national swimming team.
