= Arianna Castiglioni =

Italian swimmer (born 1997)

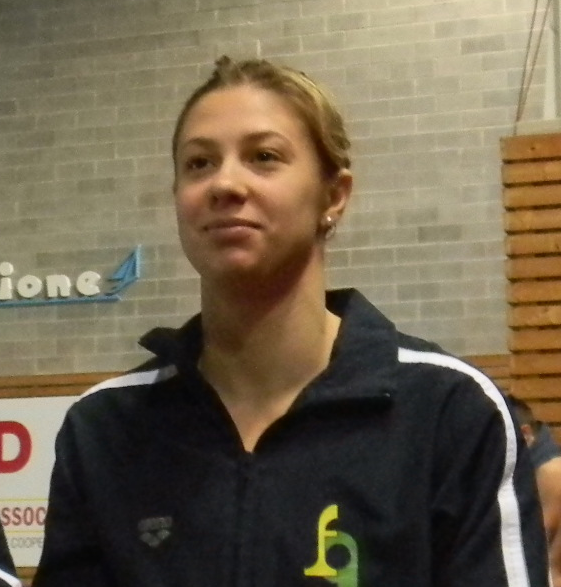

Personal information
- Born: 15 August 1997 (age 28) Busto Arsizio, Italy

Sport
- Sport: Swimming
- Club: Team Insubrika
Medal record
Representing Italy
European Championships (LC)
Silver medal – second place	2020 Budapest	100 m breaststroke
Bronze medal – third place	2014 Berlin	100 m breaststroke
Bronze medal – third place	2018 Glasgow	50 m breaststroke
Bronze medal – third place	2018 Glasgow	100 m breaststroke
Bronze medal – third place	2018 Glasgow	4×100 m mixed medley
Bronze medal – third place	2020 Budapest	4×100 m medley
European Championships (SC)
Silver medal – second place	2019 Glasgow	100 m breaststroke
Silver medal – second place	2019 Glasgow	4×50 m medley
Bronze medal – third place	2021 Kazan	4×50 m medley
Mediterranean Games
Gold medal – first place	2018 Tarragona	50 m breaststroke
Gold medal – first place	2018 Tarragona	4×100 m medley
Bronze medal – third place	2018 Tarragona	100 m breaststroke

Arianna Castiglioni (born 15 August 1997) is an Italian breaststroke swimmer. She was alternate at the 2020 Summer Olympics, in 4 × 100 m medley relay.

She won a bronze medal in the 100 m at the 2014 European Aquatics Championships.
