= Tjaša Vozel =

Slovenian swimmer

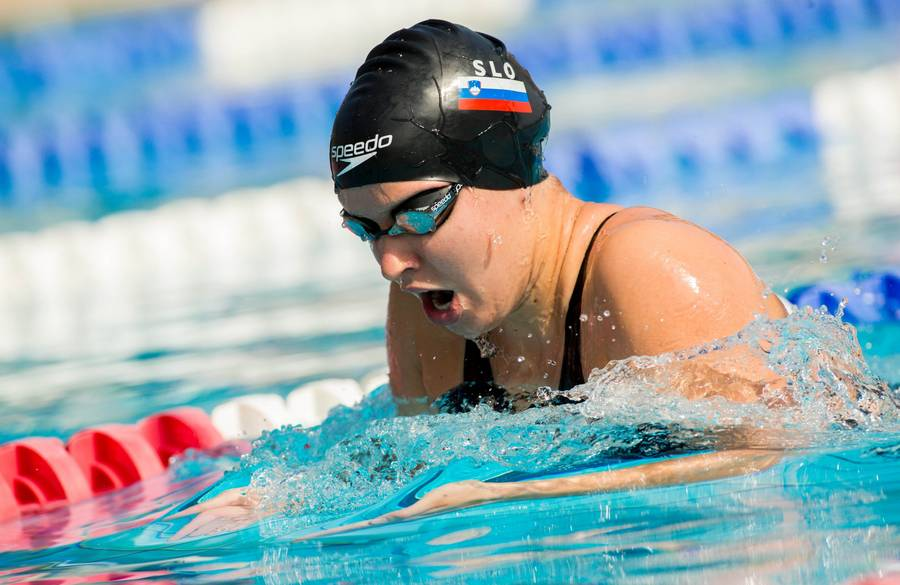
- Tjaša Vozel in 2014

Personal information
- Nationality: Slovenia
- Born: 14 July 1990 (age 35) Trbovlje
- Height: 170 cm (67 in)
- Weight: 57 kg (126 lb)

Sport
- Sport: Swimming

Tjaša Vozel (born 14 July 1990) is a Slovenian swimmer. She is competing for Slovenia at the 2012 Summer Olympics.
