= Hrafnhildur Lúthersdóttir =

Icelandic swimmer (born 1991)

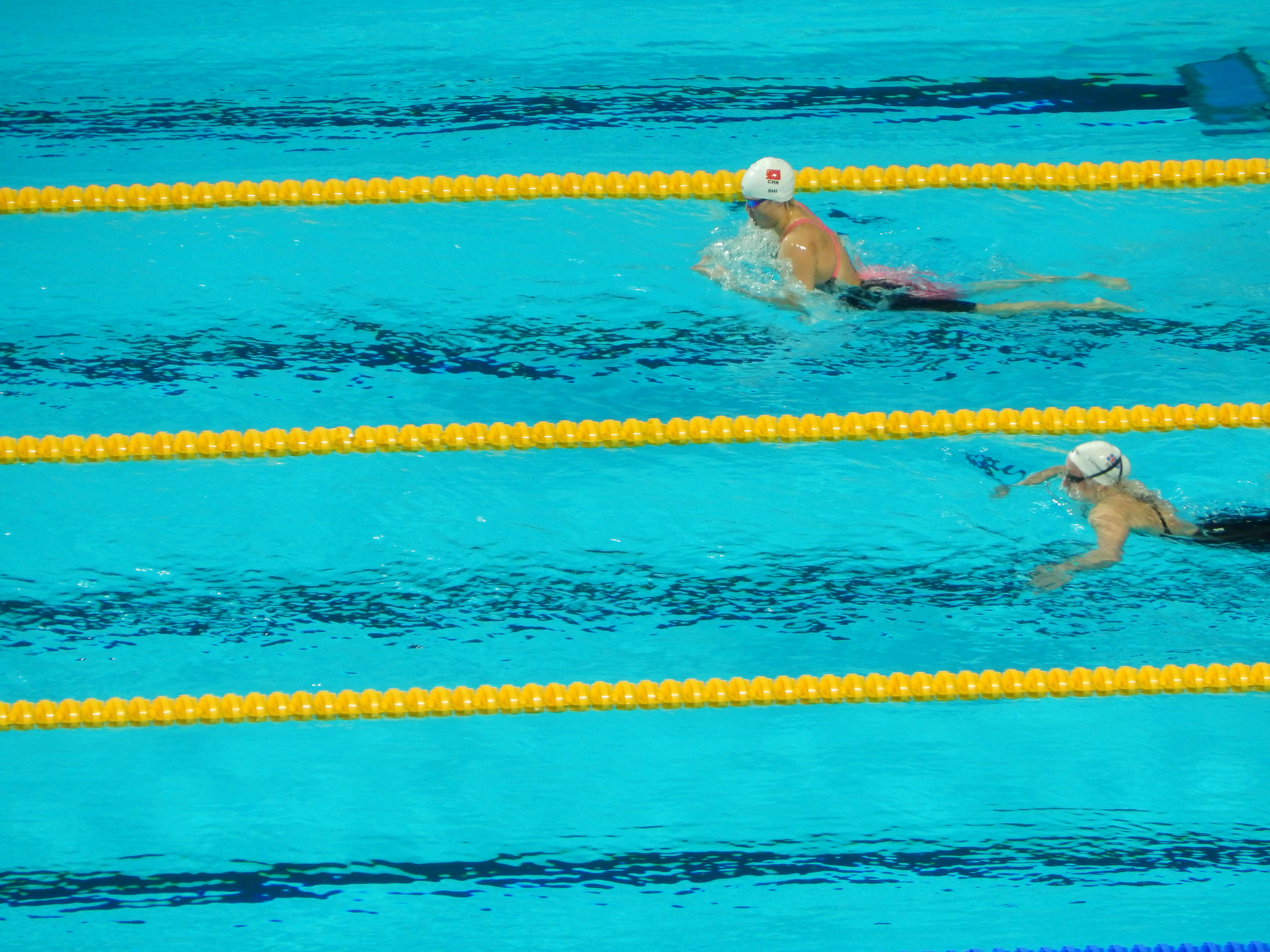

Personal information
- National team: Iceland
- Born: 2 August 1991 (age 35)
- Height: 178 cm (5 ft 10 in)
- Weight: 65 kg (143 lb)

Sport
- Sport: Swimming
- Strokes: Breaststroke
- College team: University of Florida
Medal record
Women's swimming
Representing Iceland
European Championships (LC)
Silver medal – second place	2016 London	50 m breaststroke
Silver medal – second place	2016 London	100 m breaststroke
Bronze medal – third place	2016 London	200 m breaststroke
Games of the Small States of Europe
Gold medal – first place	2009 Cyprus	100 m breaststroke
Gold medal – first place	2009 Cyprus	200 m breaststroke
Gold medal – first place	2009 Cyprus	200 m medley
Gold medal – first place	2009 Cyprus	4x100 m medley
Gold medal – first place	2011 Liechtenstein	100 m breaststroke
Gold medal – first place	2011 Liechtenstein	200 m breaststroke
Gold medal – first place	2011 Liechtenstein	200 m medley
Gold medal – first place	2013 Luxembourg	100 m breaststroke
Gold medal – first place	2013 Luxembourg	200 m breaststroke
Gold medal – first place	2013 Luxembourg	200 m medley
Gold medal – first place	2013 Luxembourg	4x100 m freestyle
Gold medal – first place	2013 Luxembourg	4x200 m freestyle
Gold medal – first place	2013 Luxembourg	4x100 m medley
Gold medal – first place	2015 Iceland	100 m breaststroke
Gold medal – first place	2015 Iceland	200 m breaststroke
Gold medal – first place	2015 Iceland	200 m medley
Gold medal – first place	2015 Iceland	400 m medley
Gold medal – first place	2017 San Marino	100 m breaststroke
Gold medal – first place	2017 San Marino	200 m breaststroke
Gold medal – first place	2017 San Marino	200 m medley
Gold medal – first place	2017 San Marino	400 m medley
Gold medal – first place	2017 San Marino	4x100 m freestyle
Gold medal – first place	2017 San Marino	4x200 m freestyle
Gold medal – first place	2017 San Marino	4x100 m medley
Silver medal – second place	2011 Liechtenstein	4x100 m medley

Hrafnhildur Lúthersdóttir (Icelandic pronunciation: [ˈr̥apn̥ˌhɪltʏr ˈluːtʰɛr̥sˌtouʰtɪr̥]; born 2 August 1991 in Hafnarfjörður is an Icelandic former swimmer. Born in Iceland, Lúthersdóttir moved to the United States to study public relations and swam for the University of Florida.

At the 2012 Summer Olympics, she was competed in the 4×100-medley relay but did not win a medal. She also competed in the 200 m breaststroke but did not progress past the first round.

At the 2016 Summer Olympics, she competed for Iceland in both the 100 m breaststroke and the 200 m breaststroke. She finished 6th in the 100 m breaststroke with a time of 1:07.18 and 5th in her semifinal of the 200 m breaststroke with a time of 2:24.41. She did not qualify for the finals, but was the flag bearer for Iceland during the closing ceremony. That same year, she won three medals at the European Championships, silver in the women's 50 and 100 m breaststroke, and bronze in the women's 200 m breastroke.

== Personal life ==
Hrafnhildur is the sister of musician Auðunn Lúthersson, better known as Auður.
