= Fiona Doyle =

Irish swimmer

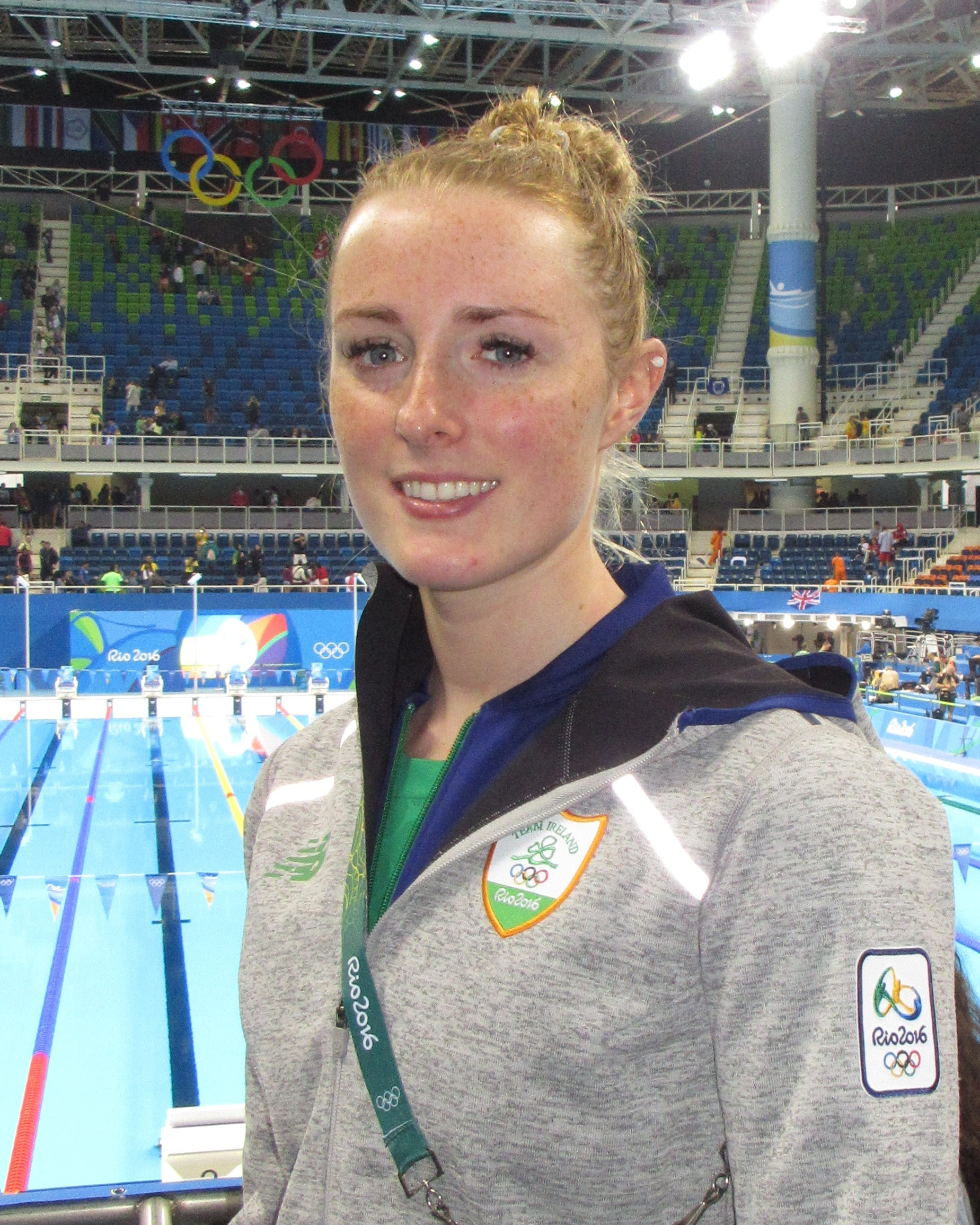
- Doyle at the 2016 Rio Olympics

Personal information
- Full name: Fiona Doyle
- Nationality: Irish
- Born: 4 October 1991 (age 35) Limerick, Ireland

Sport
- Sport: Swimming
- Club: UCSC / Portmarnock SC
- College team: University of Calgary DINOS
Medal record
Universiade
Silver medal – second place	2013 Kazan	100 m breaststroke
Silver medal – second place	2015 Gwangju	50 m breaststroke
Bronze medal – third place	2015 Gwangju	100 m breaststroke

Fiona Doyle (born 4 October 1991) is a former Irish competitive swimmer. She represented Ireland in the 2016 Rio Olympics swimming in the 100M and 200M Breaststroke. In 2013, she competed in the 100m event at the World Aquatics Championships in Barcelona where she finished eleventh overall. She won a silver medal in the 100 m breaststroke at the 2013 Summer Universiade.

In recognition of her achievements she was awarded Swim Alberta Female International Swimmer of the Year 2012/2013, University of Calgary female Athlete of the Year 2013 and SwimIreland High Performance Athlete of the Year 2013, 2014 and 2015.

Doyle represented Ireland in the women's 100 metres and 200 metres breaststroke at the 2016 Rio de Janeiro Olympic Games.

== Early life ==
Fiona attended primary school at St. Nessan's National School in Mungret, County Limerick, she then moved to the Crescent College Comprehensive in Dooradoyle, County Limerick for her second-level education. When she moved to Dublin in 2009 she attended the Institute of Education for her final year.

Fiona and her twin sister Eimear learned to swim in Saint Paul's Swimming Club which was founded in 1974 by their paternal grandad Michael J. Doyle. They then progressed to lane swimming and transferred to Limerick Swimming Club and were coached by Gerry Ryan, John Dempsey, Anne Mulcair and Barbara Nalewko. Fiona also has four other siblings.

== Career ==
In 2005, Fiona qualified for her first major international swim meet, the European Youth Olympic Festival in which she placed 4th in the 100m breaststroke in a time of 1.13. and broke her previously held Irish Record in the process. Later that summer, she went on to better that time and win a gold medal at the British Age Group Championships, Sheffield. In 2006, Swim Ireland established a High Performance centre in Limerick at the University of Limerick Arena. Fiona and Eimear were amongst the first swimmers to be selected for the new squad coached by Canadian, Steve Price and in 2007, they represented Ireland at the European Junior Swimming Championships in Antwerp where they both made finals.

In 2008 Fiona moved to Edmonton for eight weeks in an attempt to qualify for the Beijing Olympics and trained with Steve Price who had taken up the Head Coach position with EKSC, earlier in the year. While in Canada she competed in the 2008 Alberta Senior Provincial Championship in Calgary where she won Gold in the 200m Breaststroke breaking the Irish Junior record in a time of 2:35.26 and took silver in the 50 & 100 Breaststroke and 100 Freestyle. While she failed to achieve the A qualifying standard, she was still determined to swim at the Olympics. In 2009, she moved to Dublin to train with Portmarnock Swimming Club and the NAC High Performance Centre where she was coached by Anne Burdis, Peter O’Brien and Paul O’Donovan.

Doyle accepted a sports scholarship from the University of Calgary, as she wanted to train under Head Coach Mike Blondal, who had coached other international and Olympic class swimmers.

In 2014, Doyle competed in the European Long Course Championships, where she placed 7th in the 50m breaststroke.

Swim Ireland awarded her athlete of the year 2014 for the second year running.

In 2015, Doyle was awarded the 2015 CIS female swimmer of the year after winning all the breaststroke events. This was the first time since 2009 that a clean sweep was accomplished in the breaststroke events.

During the 2015 World University Games, in Gwangju South Korea, Doyle was 2nd in the 50m breaststroke and 3rd in the 100m breaststroke and she became the first Irish swimmer to qualify for the 2016 Summer Olympics.

=== 2016 Summer Olympics ===
At the Rio Olympics, she was eliminated in the heats of the 100 metre and 200 metre breaststroke events, finishing 21st and 25th respectively.

Doyle strongly criticised the participation of Russian swimmers previously sanctioned for doping offences, including Yuliya Efimova. She accused FINA and the International Olympic Committee of failing to uphold anti-doping standards and argued that the decisions were unfair to clean athletes.

=== Post-swimming career ===
After the Rio Olympics, Doyle returned to Limerick and coached swimmers part-time, whilst studying for a Medicine degree at the University of Limerick. Doyle now works as a doctor in the Irish Health Service Executive.

== International competition ==
Fiona has represented Ireland in the following competitions;

2005 EYOF Lignano
2005 European Short Course Championships Trieste
2006 European Junior Championships Majorica
2007 European Junior Championships Antwerp
2008 FINA Youth World Swimming Championships Monterey
2008 European Short Course Championships Croatia
2009 World Aquatics Championships XIII FINA World Championships Rome
2011 Summer Universiade World University Games Shenzhen
2013 Summer Universiade World University Games Kazan
2013 World Aquatics Championships XV FINA World Championships Barcelona
2013 Duel in the Pool Championships Europe vs. USA Glasgow
2014 European Long Course Championships Berlin
2015 Summer Universiade World University Games Gwangju
2015 World Aquatics Championships XVI FINA World Championships Kazan
2016 European Long Course Championships London
2016 Rio Olympic Games
