= Mariya Liver =

Ukrainian swimmer (born 1990)

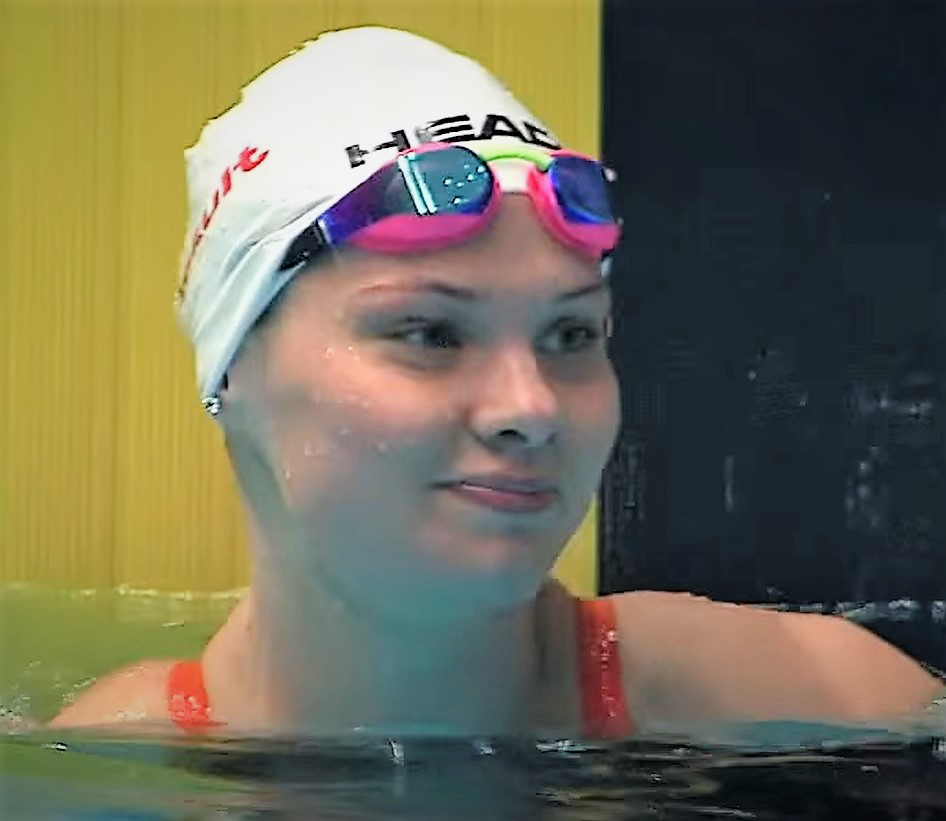
- Liver after winning 50m breaststroke in Swimming at the 2015 Summer Universiade

Personal information
- Full name: Mariya Volodymyrivna Liver
- Nationality: UKR
- Born: 11 November 1990 (age 35) Dnipropetrovsk, Ukrainian SSR, Soviet Union
- Height: 168 cm (5 ft 6 in)
- Weight: 54 kg (119 lb)

Sport
- Sport: Swimming
- Strokes: Breaststroke
Medal record
Swimming
Representing Ukraine
Summer Universiade
Gold medal – first place	2015 Gwangju	50m breaststroke

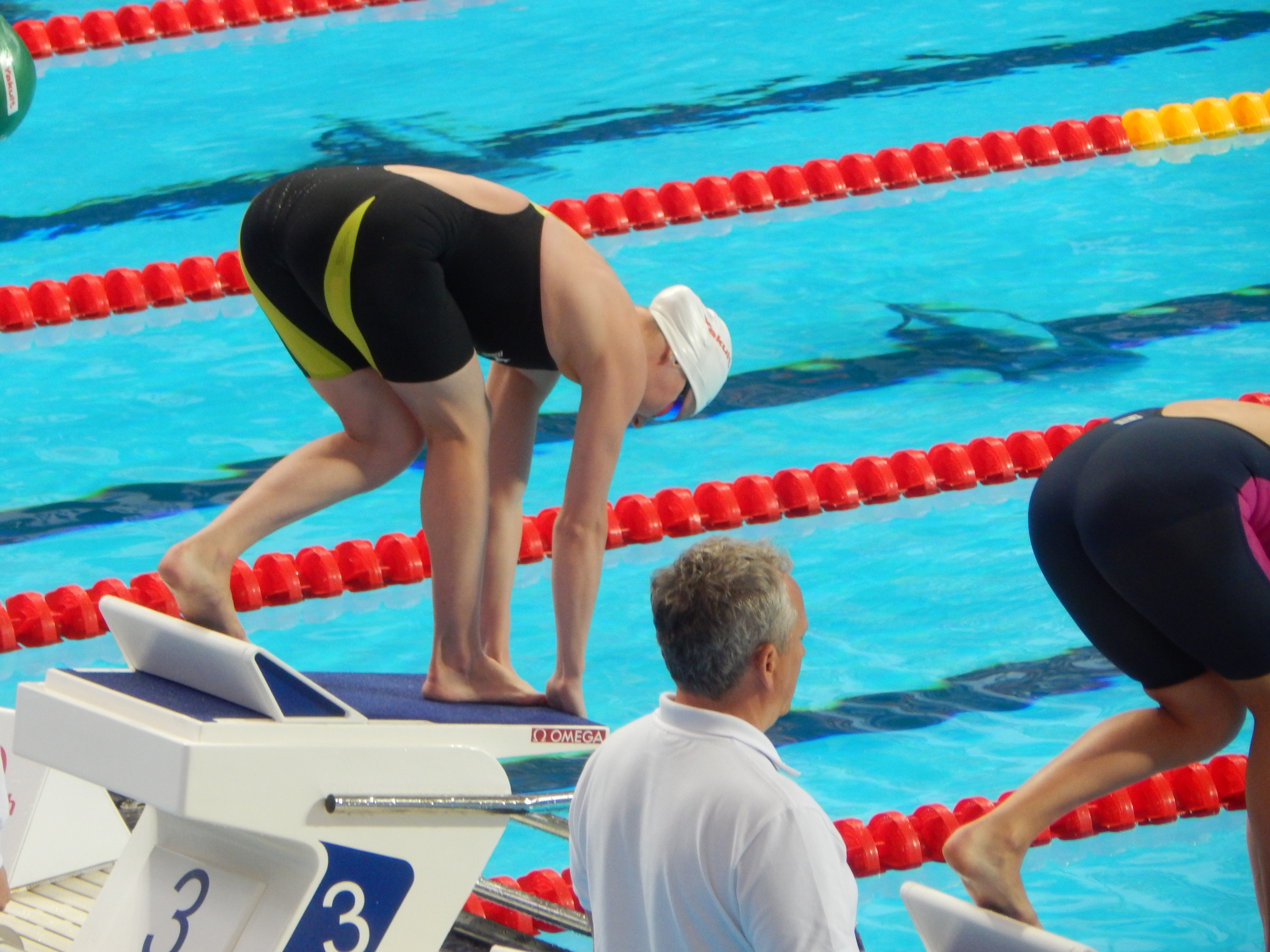
Kazan 2015

Maria Liver (Ukrainian: Марія Володимирівна Лівер; born 11 November 1990) is a Ukrainian swimmer. She competed for Ukraine at the 2012 Summer Olympics. Liver is the Ukrainian record holder in 50m breaststroke.
