= Petra Chocová =

Czech swimmer (born 1986)

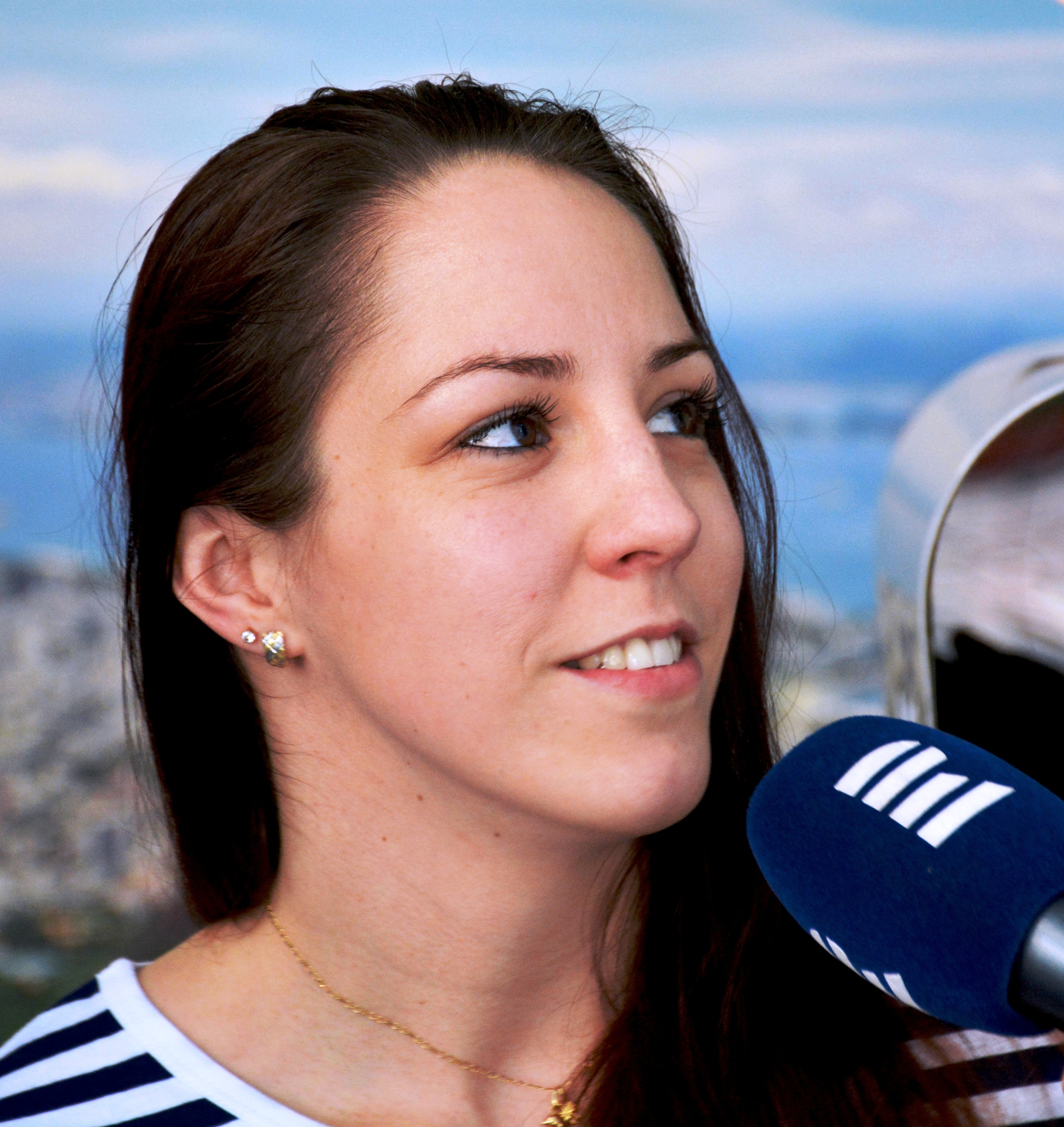

Personal information
- Full name: Petra Chocová
- Nationality: Czech
- Born: 16 August 1986 (age 39) Česká Lípa, Czechoslovakia
- Height: 1.69 m (5 ft 7 in)
- Weight: 61 kg (134 lb)

Sport
- Sport: Swimming
- Strokes: Breaststroke
- Club: PK Česká Lípa
Medal record
Representing Czech Republic
European Championships (LC)
| Gold medal – first place | 2012 Debrecen | 50 m breaststroke |
European Championships (SC)
| Gold medal – first place | 2012 Chartres | 50 m breaststroke |
| Silver medal – second place | 2012 Chartres | 100 m breaststroke |
| Silver medal – second place | 2012 Chartres | 4×50 m medley |
Summer Universiade
| Silver medal – second place | 2013 Kazan | 50 m breaststroke |

Petra Chocová (Czech pronunciation: [ˈpɛtra ˈxotsovaː], born 16 August 1986) is a Czech swimmer specialising in breaststroke.

== Biography ==
Chocová was born and lives in Česká Lípa. Her father Tomáš Choc introduced her to swimming at the age of five and was her coach for many years.

Despite winning several medals in junior categories Chocová's swimming career in adults was marred by problems with her shoulder. She underwent three surgeries before she could fully focus on the training.

At 2012 European Long Course Championships in Debrecen, Chocová won a bronze medal in non-Olympics distance of 50-metre breaststroke in a time of 31.25, a national record. In August 2012, Petra Chocová competed at 2012 Summer Olympics in London. In 100-metre breaststroke event she finished 24th and did not advance to the semi-finals.

The end of the year was more successful for her as she won gold and silver medals at short-course European championships clocking 30.02 and 1:05.50 in 50-metre and 100-metre breaststroke events. She added another silver medal as a part of 4×50 m medley relay team.

Three weeks later at 2012 World Short Course Championships in Istanbul, Petra Chocová finished 6th and 8th in 50 m and 100 m breaststroke respectively. She set a new 100-metre breaststroke national record for the Czech Republic in August 2014, completing the course in a time of 1:07.66 at the 2014 European Aquatics Championships in Berlin.

== Personal bests ==
Long course

- 50 m breaststroke 31.25 NR (27 May 2012, Debrecen, Hungary)
- 100 m breaststroke 1:07.66 NR (19 August 2014, Berlin, Germany)
- 200 m breaststroke 2:28.37 NR (30 July 2009, Rome, Italy)

Short course

- 50 m breaststroke 30.02 NR (twice on 22 November 2012, Chartres, France)
- 100 m breaststroke 1:05.50 NR (25 November 2012, Chartres, France)
- 200 m breaststroke 2:24.08 NR (23 November 2012, Chartres, France)
