= Jenna Laukkanen =

Finnish swimmer

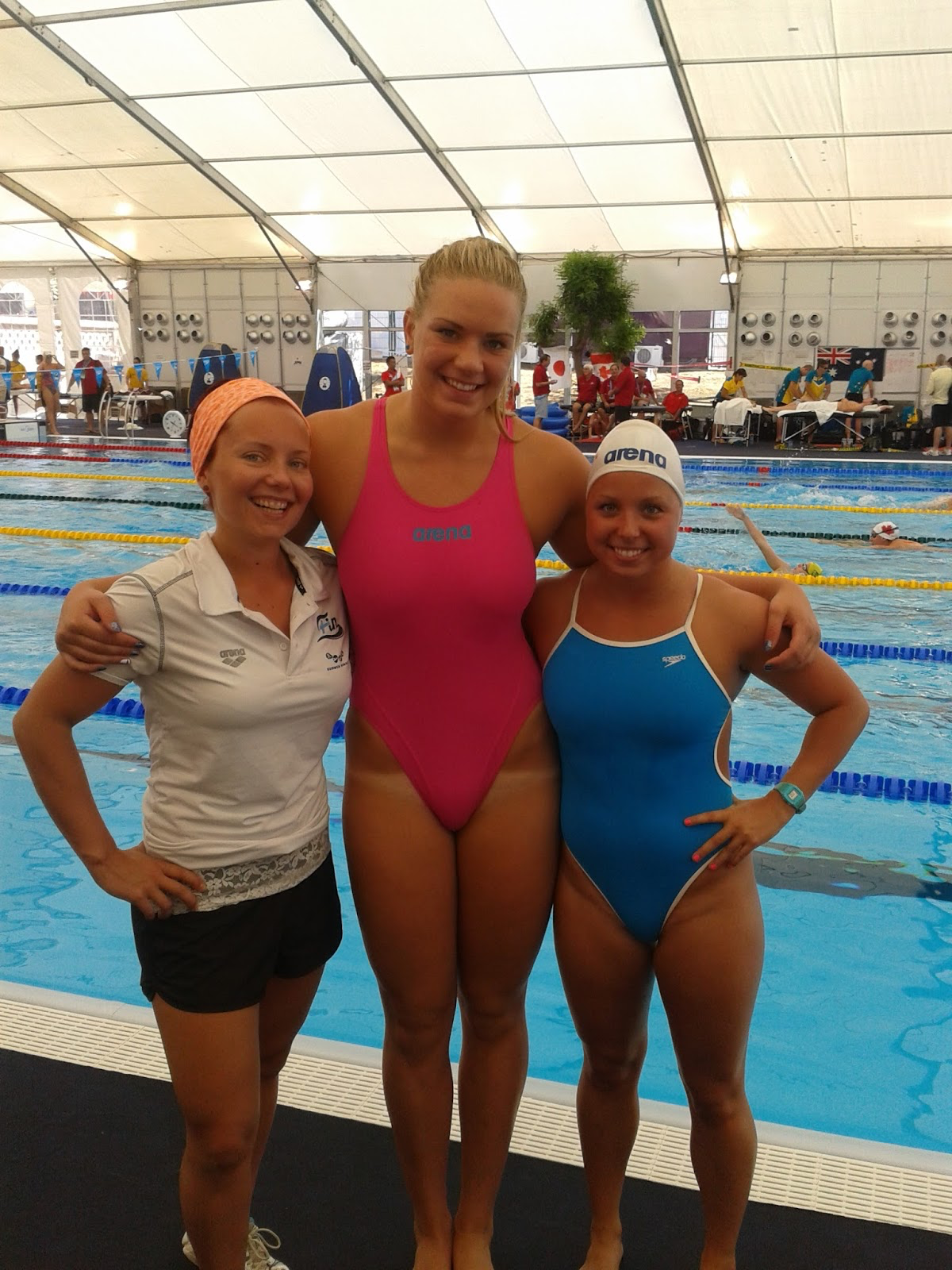
- Jenna Laukkanen, center, at 2013 World Aquatics Championships

Personal information
- Nationality: Finland
- Born: March 2, 1995 (age 31) Kuhmo, Finland
- Height: 1.82 m (6 ft 0 in)
- Weight: 80 kg (176 lb)

Sport
- Sport: Swimming
- Strokes: Breaststroke
Medal record
Women's swimming
Representing Finland
European Championships (LC)
Bronze medal – third place	2016 London	50 m breaststroke
Bronze medal – third place	2016 London	4×100 m medley
European Championships (SC)
Gold medal – first place	2015 Netanya	50 m breaststroke
Gold medal – first place	2015 Netanya	100 m breaststroke
Silver medal – second place	2017 Copenhagen	50 m breaststroke
Silver medal – second place	2017 Copenhagen	100 m breaststroke
Bronze medal – third place	2019 Glasgow	100 m individual medley
Bronze medal – third place	2019 Glasgow	100 m breaststroke

Jenna Laukkanen (born 2 March 1995) is a Finnish swimmer with a specialty in the breaststroke. She currently represents Team Iron in the International Swimming League.

Laukkanen competed in the 2011 European Junior Swimming Championships, winning a bronze medal in the 50m breaststroke and a silver medal in the 100m breaststroke. She competed for Team Finland at the 2012 Summer Olympics. Her final ranking in the 100m breaststroke was 34th and 32nd in the 200m breaststroke. In the 2015 European Short Course Swimming Championships, Laukkanen won gold medals in the 50m and 100m breaststroke. At the 2016 European Aquatics Championships, she won bronze medals in the 50m breaststroke and the 4 × 100 m medley. She competed for Team Finland at the 2016 Summer Olympics in Rio de Janeiro, Brazil.

== International Swimming League ==
In 2019 she was a member of the 2019 International Swimming League representing Team Iron.
