= Martina Moravčíková =

Czech swimmer (born 1988)

Personal information
- Born: August 13, 1988 (age 37) Rimavská Sobota, Czechoslovakia

Sport
- Sport: Swimming
- Strokes: Breaststroke
- College team: Tennessee
Medal record
Representing Czech Republic
Summer Universiade
Bronze medal – third place	2015 Gwangju	200m breaststroke

Martina Moravčíková (Czech pronunciation: [ˈmarcɪna ˈmoraftʃiːkovaː]; born August 13, 1988) is a Czech swimmer. At the 2012 Summer Olympics, she competed in the Women's 200 metre breaststroke, finishing in 26th place overall in the heats, failing to qualify for the semifinals. At the 2016 Olympic Games, she competed in the women's 100 m and 200 m breaststroke. She narrowly missed qualifying for the semifinals in the 200 m.

== Personal and early life ==
Martina Moravčíková was born in 1988 to Ingrid Moravcikova and Jaroslav, a NATO officer. She resides in Tennessee where from 2010 to 2011 she attended University of Tennessee. There, she obtained a double major in global studies, language and world business. She enjoys extreme sports such as surfing and snowboarding. A huge admirer of Australian gold medalist Leisel Jones, she aspires to work in the American-Chinese import and export business.
