= Fanny Lecluyse =

Belgian swimmer (born 1992)

Personal information
- Born: 11 March 1992 (age 34) Kortrijk, Belgium

Sport
- Sport: Swimming
- Strokes: Breaststroke
- Club: Royal Dauphins Mouscronnois
Medal record
Women's swimming
Representing Belgium
World Championships (SC)
Bronze medal – third place	2018 Hangzhou	200 m breaststroke
European Championships (SC)
Gold medal – first place	2015 Netanya	200 m breaststroke
Silver medal – second place	2015 Netanya	50 m breaststroke
Bronze medal – third place	2011 Szczecin	200 m breaststroke
Bronze medal – third place	2017 Copenhagen	200 m breaststroke

Fanny Lecluyse (born 11 March 1992) is a Belgian former swimmer. At the 2012 Summer Olympics, she competed in the women's 200 metre breaststroke, finishing in 19th place overall in the heats, failing to qualify for the semifinals. Belgium's Olympic Committee said that Lecluyse "was sent home before the end of the games after an incident of inappropriate behavior."

She won bronze in the 200 m breaststroke at the 2018 Short Course World Championships. She has also won four medals at the European Championships in the 25 m pool (gold in the 200 m breaststroke in 2015, silver in the 50 m breaststroke also in 2015, and bronze in the 200 m breaststroke in 2011 and 2017).

At the 2016 Olympics, she competed in the 100 and 200 m breaststroke. She competed in the 200m breaststroke at the 2020 Olympics.
