= Swimming at the 2024 Summer Olympics – Women's 200-metre breaststroke =

Women's 200-metre breaststroke at the Games of the XXXIII Olympiad
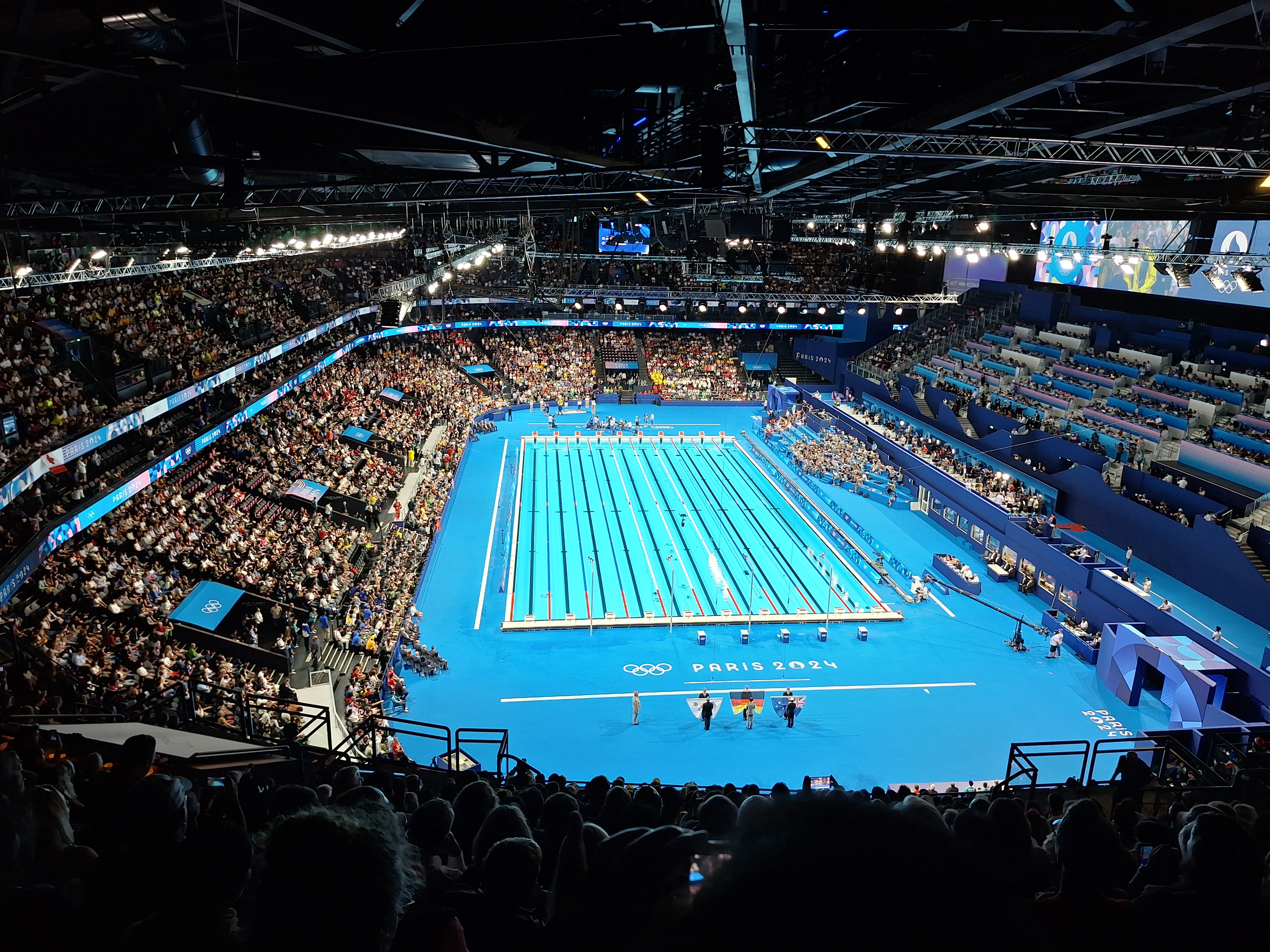
- Paris La Défense Arena after it was converted to a swimming pool for the swimming events
- Venue: Paris La Défense Arena
- Dates: 31 July 2024 (Heats and Semis); 1 August 2024 (Final)
- Competitors: 23 from 19 nations
- Winning time: 2:19.24

Medalists
1st place, gold medalist(s)		Kate Douglass	United States
2nd place, silver medalist(s)		Tatjana Smith	South Africa
3rd place, bronze medalist(s)		Tes Schouten	Netherlands

The women's 200-metre breaststroke event at the 2024 Summer Olympics was held from 31 July to 1 August 2024 at Paris La Défense Arena, which was converted to a swimming pool for the swimming events.

South Africa's Tatjana Smith and the US' Kate Douglass were considered by Swimming World and SwimSwam to be the most likely to win the race, while the Netherlands' Tes Schouten and the US' Lilly King were also considered likely to win medals. All four of them qualified for the final. In the final, Smith and Douglass swam close to each other the entire race, but Douglass finished first to win gold with a time of 2:19.24. Smith won silver with 2:19.60 and Schouten won bronze with 2:21.05. Douglass' swim broke her own American record by 0.06. Smith retired from swimming after the race.

== Background ==
South Africa's Tatjana Smith won the event at the previous Olympics. (Note: In November 2023, after getting married, Tatjana changed her last name from Schoenmaker to Smith.) She also won the event at the 2022 Commonwealth Games and at the 2023 World Championships, and had the third fastest qualifying time of 2:20.80. The fastest qualifying time of 02:19:30 belonged to the US' Kate Douglass, who also won silver at the 2023 and 2024 World Championships. She also won the 100 metres freestyle event at the US Olympic Trials, but chose not to compete in order to focus on the 200 metres breaststroke. Tes Schouten of the Netherlands won the event at the 2024 World Championships, where she swam the second fastest qualifying time of 02:19:81. The US' Lilly King won silver at the previous Olympics, and she held the fourth fastest qualifying time of 02:20:95.

SwimSwam predicted Smith would win and Douglass would come second, while Swimming World predicted it would be the other way around. Both SwimSwam and Swimming World predicted Schouten would come third.

The event was held at Paris La Défense Arena, which was converted to a swimming pool for the swimming events.

== Qualification ==
Each National Olympic Committee (NOC) was permitted to enter a maximum of two qualified athletes in each individual event, but only if both of them had attained the Olympic Qualifying Time (OQT). For this event, the OQT was 2:23.91. World Aquatics then considered athletes qualifying through universality; NOCs were given one event entry for each gender, which could be used by any athlete regardless of qualification time, providing the spaces had not already been taken by athletes from that nation who had achieved the OQT. Finally, the rest of the spaces were filled by athletes who had met the Olympic Consideration Time (OCT), which was 2:24.63 for this event. In total, 16 athletes qualified through achieving the OQT, three athletes qualified through universality places and four athletes qualified through achieving the OCT.

Top 10 fastest qualification times
Swimmer	Country	Time	Competition
Kate Douglass	United States	02:19:30	2024 Pro Swim Series Knoxville
Tes Schouten	Netherlands	02:19:81	2024 World Aquatics Championships
Tatjana Smith	South Africa	02:20:80	2023 World Aquatics Championships
Lilly King	United States	02:20:95	2023 United States National Championships
Thea Blomsterberg	Denmark	02:22:42	2023 World Aquatics Championships
Mona McSharry	Ireland	02:22:49	2024 Mel Zajac Jr. International
Ye Shiwen	China	02:22:55	2024 Chinese Championships
Jenna Strauch	Australia	02:22:83	2023 World Aquatics Championships
Kotryna Teterevkova	Lithuania	02:22:86	2023 Summer World University Games
Ella Ramsay	Australia	02:22:87	2024 Australian Olympic Trials

== Heats ==
Three heats (preliminary rounds) took place on 31 July 2024, starting at 11:00. (Note: All times are Central European Summer Time (UTC+2)) The swimmers with the best 16 times in the heats advanced to the semifinals. Smith qualified with the fastest time of 2:21.57, Schouten qualified second, Douglass qualified third and King qualified in eleventh place. 35-year-old Jessica Vall of Spain qualified in ninth place. None of the competitors swam faster than their Olympic Qualifying Time.

Results
Rank	Heat	Lane	Swimmer	Nation	Time	Notes
1	1	4	Tatjana Smith	South Africa	2:21.57	Q
2	2	4	Tes Schouten	Netherlands	2:23.08	Q
3	3	4	Kate Douglass	United States	2:23.44	Q
4	3	3	Ye Shiwen	China	2:23.67	Q
5	1	6	Kaylene Corbett	South Africa	2:23.85	Q
6	3	2	Satomi Suzuki	Japan	2:23.80	Q
7	1	5	Mona McSharry	Ireland	2:23.98	Q
8	2	3	Jenna Strauch	Australia	2:24.38	Q
9	2	7	Jessica Vall	Spain	2:24.52	Q
10	1	3	Kotryna Teterevkova	Lithuania	2:24.59	Q
11	3	5	Lilly King	United States	2:24.91	Q
12	2	2	Kelsey Wog	Canada	2:25.11	Q
13	2	6	Sydney Pickrem	Canada	2:25.45	Q
14	3	6	Ella Ramsay	Australia	2:25.61	Q
15	3	7	Francesca Fangio	Italy	2:25.85	Q
16	1	2	Kristýna Horská	Czech Republic	2:26.28	Q
17	2	1	Lisa Mamié	Switzerland	2:26.39	
18	2	8	Macarena Ceballos	Argentina	2:26.55	
19	2	5	Thea Blomsterberg	Denmark	2:27.81	
20	1	1	Sophie Hansson	Sweden	2:28.10	
21	1	7	Alina Zmushka	Individual Neutral Athletes	2:28.19	
22	3	1	Letitia Sim	Singapore	2:29.46	
23	3	8	Eneli Jefimova	Estonia	2:30.68	

== Semifinals ==
Two semifinals took place on 31 July, starting at 22:03. The swimmers with the best 8 times in the semifinals advanced to the final. Schouten won the first semifinal to qualify with the third fastest time of 2:22.74, while Douglass won the second semifinal to qualify with the fastest time of 2:19.74. Smith finished second in the second heat to qualify with the second fastest time of 2:19.94. The other final qualifiers were South Africa's Kaylene Corbett, China's Ye Shiwen, King, Lithuania's Kotryna Teterevkova and Japan's Satomi Suzuki.

Results
Rank	Heat	Lane	Swimmer	Nation	Time	Notes
1	2	5	Kate Douglass	United States	2:19.74	Q
2	2	4	Tatjana Smith	South Africa	2:19.94	Q
3	1	4	Tes Schouten	Netherlands	2:22.74	Q
4	1	3	Kaylene Corbett	South Africa	2:22.87	Q
5	1	5	Ye Shiwen	China	2:23.13	Q
6	2	7	Lilly King	United States	2:23.25	Q
7	1	2	Kotryna Teterevkova	Lithuania	2:23.42	Q
8	2	3	Satomi Suzuki	Japan	2:23.54	Q
9	2	1	Sydney Pickrem	Canada	2:24.03	
10	1	6	Jenna Strauch	Australia	2:24.05	
11	2	6	Mona McSharry	Ireland	2:24.48	
12	1	1	Ella Ramsay	Australia	2:24.56	
13	1	7	Kelsey Wog	Canada	2:24.82	
14	2	8	Francesca Fangio	Italy	2:25.39	
15	1	8	Kristýna Horská	Czech Republic	2:25.77	
16	2	2	Jessica Vall	Spain	2:26.22	

== Final ==
The final took place at 21:11 on 1 August 2024. Douglass and Smith swam close to each other the entire race. Smith was 0.23 seconds ahead of Douglass at the 50 metre split, but at the 100 metre split Douglass was ahead by 0.12, and 150 metres into the race she was 0.19 seconds ahead. Douglass finished first with a new American Record of 2:19.24, Smith finished second to win the silver with 2:19.60 and Schouten finished third with 2:21.05.

Douglass' swim broke her own American record by 0.06, winning her her first individual Olympic medal. Smith's silver was her fourth Olympic medal, which tied her for the most medals won by a South African swimmer with Chad le Clos. She retired from swimming after the race.

Results
Rank	Lane	Swimmer	Nation	Time	Notes
1st place, gold medalist(s)	4	Kate Douglass	United States	2:19.24	AM
2nd place, silver medalist(s)	5	Tatjana Smith	South Africa	2:19.60	
3rd place, bronze medalist(s)	3	Tes Schouten	Netherlands	2:21.05	
4	8	Satomi Suzuki	Japan	2:22.54	
5	1	Kotryna Teterevkova	Lithuania	2:23.75	
6	2	Ye Shiwen	China	2:24.31	
7	6	Kaylene Corbett	South Africa	2:24.46	
8	7	Lilly King	United States	2:25.91	

Statistics
Name	50 metre split	100 metre split	150 metre split	Time	Stroke rate (strokes/min)
Kate Douglass	00:31.83	01:07.09	01:42.90	2:19.24	34.9
Tatjana Smith	00:31.60	01:07.21	01:43.09	2:19.60	35.7
Tes Schouten	00:32.07	01:07.57	01:43.79	2:21.05	33.4
Satomi Suzuki	00:32.15	01:08.03	01:45.19	2:22.54	37.6
Kotryna Teterevkova	00:32.80	01:09.47	01:46.28	2:23.75	34.1
Ye Shiwen	00:32.85	01:09.26	01:46.54	2:24.31	36.7
Kaylene Corbett	00:32.66	01:08.95	01:45.86	2:24.46	41.0
Lilly King	00:32.25	01:08.62	01:46.70	2:25.91	41.8
