= Swimming at the 2022 Commonwealth Games – Women's 50 metre breaststroke =

Women's 50 metre breaststroke at the 2022 Commonwealth Games
- Venue: Sandwell Aquatics Centre
- Dates: 29 July (heats, semifinals); 30 July (final)
- Competitors: 33 from 25 nations
- Winning time: 29.73 GR

Medalists
gold medal	Lara van Niekerk	South Africa
silver medal	Imogen Clark	England
bronze medal	Chelsea Hodges	Australia

The women's 50 metre breaststroke event at the 2022 Commonwealth Games will be held on 29 and 30 July at the Sandwell Aquatics Centre.

== Records ==
Prior to this competition, the existing world, Commonwealth and Games records were as follows:

World record	Benedetta Pilato (ITA)	29.30	Budapest, Hungary	22 May 2021
Commonwealth record	Lara van Niekerk (RSA)	29.72	Port Elizabeth, South Africa	6 April 2022
Games record	Alia Atkinson (JAM)	30.17	Glasgow, United Kingdom	24 July 2014

The following records were established during the competition:

Date	Event	Name	Nationality	Time	Record
29 July	Heat 5	Lara van Niekerk	South Africa	29.82	GR
29 July	Semifinal 2	Lara van Niekerk	South Africa	29.80	GR
30 July	Final	Lara van Niekerk	South Africa	29.73	GR

== Schedule ==
The schedule is as follows:

All times are British Summer Time (UTC+1)

Date	Time	Round
Friday 29 July 2022	11:37	Qualifying
Friday 29 July 2022	20:19	Semifinals
Saturday 30 July 2022	19:12	Final

== Results ==
=== Heats ===
Rank	Heat	Lane	Name	Nationality	Time	Notes
1	5	4	Lara van Niekerk	South Africa	29.82	Q, GR
2	4	4	Imogen Clark	England	30.26	Q
3	3	4	Chelsea Hodges	Australia	30.66	Q
4	5	5	Tatjana Schoenmaker	South Africa	30.76	Q
5	3	5	Jenna Strauch	Australia	30.77	Q
6	5	3	Kara Hanlon	Scotland	30.99	Q
7	4	6	Kaylene Corbett	South Africa	31.07	Q
8	4	3	Abbey Harkin	Australia	31.48	Q
9	5	6	Sophie Angus	Canada	31.55	Q
10	4	5	Sarah Vasey	England	31.65	Q
11	3	3	Letitia Sim	Singapore	31.67	Q
12	3	6	Laura Kinley	Isle of Man	32.34	Q
13	3	1	Lanihei Connolly	Cook Islands	32.77	Q, NR
14	4	2	Phee Jinq En	Malaysia	32.80	Q
15	3	2	Laura le Cras	Guernsey	33.09	Q
16	5	2	Lillian Higgs	Bahamas	33.18	Q
17	5	7	Rhanishka Gibbs	Bahamas	33.28	R
18	4	1	Kirsten Fisher-Marsters	Cook Islands	33.61	R
19	3	7	Mackenzie Headley	Jamaica	33.85	
20	4	7	Kirabo Namutebi	Uganda	33.87	
21	5	8	Kelera Mudunasoko	Fiji	34.14	
22	5	1	Tilka Paljk	Zambia	34.20	
23	4	8	Tessa Ip Hen Cheung	Mauritius	34.45	
24	3	8	Asia Kent	Gibraltar	34.47	
25	2	4	Georgia-Leigh Vele	Papua New Guinea	36.51	
26	1	4	Tia Gun-Munro	Saint Vincent and the Grenadines	37.24	
27	2	1	Abigail Deshong	Saint Vincent and the Grenadines	37.42	
28	2	2	Brooke Yon	Saint Helena	37.51	
29	2	3	Unilez Takyi	Ghana	37.68	
30	2	5	Mst Morium Akter	Bangladesh	37.90	
31	2	6	Mishael Aisha Hyat Ayub	Pakistan	37.96	
32	2	7	Vaoahi Afu	Tonga	40.65	
33	1	5	Kanu Isha	Sierra Leone	48.66	
	1	3	Siomha Brady	Northern Ireland	DNS	

=== Semifinals ===
Rank	Heat	Lane	Name	Nationality	Time	Notes
1	2	4	Lara van Niekerk	South Africa	29.80	Q, GR
2	1	4	Imogen Clark	England	30.24	Q
3	2	5	Chelsea Hodges	Australia	30.50	Q
4	2	3	Jenna Strauch	Australia	30.89	Q
5	1	5	Tatjana Schoenmaker	South Africa	30.94	Q
6	1	3	Kara Hanlon	Scotland	31.20	Q
7	1	6	Abbey Harkin	Australia	31.39	Q
8	2	6	Kaylene Corbett	South Africa	31.43	Q
9	2	2	Sophie Angus	Canada	31.45	R
10	1	2	Sarah Vasey	England	31.47	R
11	2	7	Letitia Sim	Singapore	31.56	
12	1	7	Laura Kinley	Isle of Man	32.47	
13	1	1	Phee Jinq En	Malaysia	32.54	
14	2	1	Lanihei Connolly	Cook Islands	32.91	
15	1	8	Lillian Higgs	Bahamas	33.10	
16	2	8	Laura le Cras	Guernsey	33.26	

=== Final ===
Rank	Lane	Name	Nationality	Time	Notes
1st place, gold medalist(s)	4	Lara van Niekerk	South Africa	29.73	GR
2nd place, silver medalist(s)	5	Imogen Clark	England	30.02	NR
3rd place, bronze medalist(s)	3	Chelsea Hodges	Australia	30.05	OC
4	2	Tatjana Schoenmaker	South Africa	30.41	
5	6	Jenna Strauch	Australia	30.85	
6	8	Kaylene Corbett	South Africa	31.10	
7	1	Abbey Harkin	Australia	31.20	
8	7	Kara Hanlon	Scotland	31.39	
