= Lara van Niekerk =

South African swimmer (born 2003)

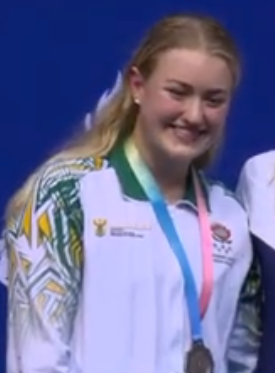
- At the 2025 Summer World University Games

Personal information
- National team: South Africa
- Born: 13 May 2003 (age 23) Pretoria, South Africa

Sport
- Sport: Swimming
- Strokes: Breaststroke
- Coach: Eugene da Ponte
Medal record
Women's swimming
Representing South Africa
Event	1st	2nd	3rd
World Championships (LC)	0	0	1
World Championships (SC)	0	1	0
Commonwealth Games	3	0	1
African Championships	7	2	0
Total	10	3	2
World Championships (LC)
Bronze medal – third place	2022 Budapest	50 m breaststroke
World Championships (SC)
Silver medal – second place	2022 Melbourne	50 m breaststroke
Commonwealth Games
Gold medal – first place	2022 Birmingham	50 m breaststroke
Gold medal – first place	2026 Glasgow	50 m breaststroke
Gold medal – first place	2022 Birmingham	100 m breaststroke
Bronze medal – third place	2026 Glasgow	4×100 m medley relay
World University Games
Silver medal – second place	2025 Rhine-Ruhr	50 m breaststroke
African Championships
Gold medal – first place	2018 Algiers	50 m breaststroke
Gold medal – first place	2018 Algiers	100 m breaststroke
Gold medal – first place	2018 Algiers	200 m breaststroke
Gold medal – first place	2018 Algiers	4×100 m medley
Gold medal – first place	2024 Luanda	50 m breaststroke
Gold medal – first place	2024 Luanda	200 m breaststroke
Gold medal – first place	2024 Luanda	4×100 m mixed medley
Silver medal – second place	2024 Luanda	100 m breaststroke
Silver medal – second place	2024 Luanda	4×100 m freestyle
African Junior Championships
Gold medal – first place	2017 Cairo	50 m breaststroke
Gold medal – first place	2017 Cairo	100 m breaststroke
Gold medal – first place	2017 Cairo	4×100 m medley
Gold medal – first place	2017 Cairo	4×100 m mixed medley
Silver medal – second place	2017 Cairo	200 m breaststroke

Lara van Niekerk (born 13 May 2003) is a South African competitive swimmer. She is the current African, Commonwealth, and South African record holder in the long course 50-metre breaststroke and the African and South African record holder in the short course 50-metre breaststroke. She won gold medals in the 50-metre breaststroke at the 2018 African Swimming Championships and the 2022 Commonwealth Games as well as a silver medal at the 2022 World Short Course Championships and the bronze medal at the 2022 World Aquatics Championships (long course) in the same event. In the 100-metre breaststroke, she won gold medals at the 2018 African Swimming Championships and the 2022 Commonwealth Games.

== Background ==
Van Niekerk was born 13 May 2003 in South Africa.

== Career ==
=== 2017–2019 ===
At the 2017 African Junior Swimming Championships in Cairo, Egypt in March, Van Niekerk won a total of five medals including gold medals in the 100-metre breaststroke, 4×100-metre mixed medley relay, 50-metre breaststroke, 4×100-metre medley relay, and a silver medal in the 200-metre breaststroke.

2018 African Championships
Gold medal – first place	200 m breaststroke	2:35.25
Gold medal – first place	50 m breaststroke	31.99 (CR)
Gold medal – first place	100 m breaststroke	1:11.13
Gold medal – first place	4×100 m medley	4:12.83

In 2018, at the year's African Swimming Championships in Algiers, Algeria, Van Niekerk won a gold medal in each of the four events she competed. She won her first gold medal in the 200-metre breaststroke with a time of 2:35.25. For her second gold medal, she won the 50-metre breaststroke with a new Championships record time of 31.99 seconds, which broke the former record of 32.06 seconds set by Tilka Paljk of Zambia in the prelims heats. In the 100-metre breaststroke, she won her third gold medal of the Championships, finishing over eight-tenths of a second ahead of the silver medalist in the event with a time of 1:11.13. For her fourth and final event of the Championships, she concluded with another gold medal, this time helping win the 4×100-metre medley relay in 4:12.83, splitting a 1:10.40 for the breaststroke leg of the relay.

The following year, Van Niekerk competed in four events at the 2019 World Junior Swimming Championships in Budapest, Hungary, placing fourth in the 50-metre breaststroke with a 31.12, 20th in the 100-metre breaststroke with a 1:10.95, 30th in the 200-metre breaststroke with a 2:36.91, and tenth in 4:15.71 as part of the 4×100-metre medley relay with a split of 1:11.42 for the breaststroke leg of the relay.

=== 2021 ===
In April 2021, at the 2021 South Africa National Swimming Championships in Gqeberha, Van Niekerk won the silver medal in the 100-metre breaststroke with a time of 1:07.40, which was 1.68 seconds faster than the Olympic Selection Time of 1:09.08 and 0.33 seconds slower than the Olympic Qualification Time of 1:07.07, however she was not sent to represent South Africa at the 2020 Summer Olympics as that one roster spot went to automatic qualifier Tatjana Schoenmaker who won the gold medal in an Olympic Qualifying Time.

At the 2021 South Africa National Short Course Championships in Pietermaritzburg in September, Van Niekerk set two new African and South African records in the short course 50-metre breaststroke, first setting a mark of 30.06 seconds in the prelims heats, then lowering her records to a time of 29.85 seconds in the final. Her swim made her the first South African woman to swim the race in less than 30 seconds. Approximately two months later, she set new African, South African, and Commonwealth records in the long course 50-metre breaststroke with a time of 29.88 seconds at the 2021 Northern Tigers Swimming Championships in Pretoria. With her time of 29.88 seconds, she also became the first South African woman to finish the event faster than 30 seconds and the seventh-fastest female swimmer in the event in history.

=== 2022 ===
==== 2022 South Africa National Championships (LC) ====
Van Niekerk swam faster than 1:07.00 in the long course 100-metre breaststroke twice at the 2022 Grand Prix international meet number two in Durban in February, first swimming a personal best time of 1:06.52 in the preliminary heats, then a 1:06.74 in the final. For the 2022 South Africa National Swimming Championships in Gqeberha in April, in part a selection meet to determine the 2022 World Aquatics Championships and 2022 Commonwealth Games South Africa team members, she entered to compete in the 50-metre breaststroke, 50-metre freestyle, 50-metre butterfly, and 100-metre breaststroke. On the first day of competition, 6 April, she set new African, South African, and Commonwealth records in the 50-metre breaststroke, lowering her former mark of 29.88 seconds from 2021 to 29.72 seconds in the prelims heats of the event. The records were ratified by the governing body for aquatic sports in South Africa, Swimming South Africa, on 7 April 2022.

In the final, Van Niekerk placed first in 30.60 seconds, finishing 0.27 seconds ahead of second-place finisher Tatjana Schoenmaker and attaining a qualifying time for both the World Championships and the Commonwealth Games. In the prelims heats of the 50-metre freestyle on day two, she swam a 27.53 in prelims heat six and did not advance to the final in the evening. For the 50-metre butterfly prelims heats on day three, she placed sixth in prelims heat one with a time of 28.57 seconds, not making the top eight across all prelims heats and thus not qualifying for the evening final. On the fourth day, in the prelims heats of the 100-metre breaststroke, she swam a personal best time of 1:06.08 and qualified for the evening final, where she went on to swim a personal best time of 1:05.67 to win the gold medal and achieve a qualifying time for the World Championships and Commonwealth Games. She was named to both the 2022 World Aquatics Championships and 2022 Commonwealth Games teams.

==== 2022 World Aquatics Championships ====
2022 World Championships (LC)
Bronze medal – third place	50 m breaststroke	29.90

In her first event of the 2022 World Aquatics Championships, the 100-metre breaststroke, Van Niekerk qualified for the evening semifinals with a time of 1:06.75 and rank of tenth from the preliminaries. She equalled her time of 1:06.75 in the semifinals, this time placing thirteenth and not advancing to the final. In the preliminaries of the 50-metre breaststroke five days later, she ranked first overall with a time of 29.77 seconds and advanced to the semifinals. She finished in a time of 29.99 seconds in the semifinals, qualifying for the final ranking third behind Benedetta Pilato of Italy and Rūta Meilutytė of Lithuania. In the final of the 50-metre breaststroke, she won the first medal for South Africa in any aport at the 2022 World Aquatics Championships, a bronze medal with a time of 29.90 seconds, and continued on the streak of South Africa winning at least one medal at a FINA World Aquatics Championships since 2001.

==== 2022 Commonwealth Games ====
2022 Commonwealth Games
Gold medal – first place	50 m breaststroke	29.73 (GR)
Gold medal – first place	100 m breaststroke	1:05.47

On the first day of swimming at the 2022 Commonwealth Games, in Birmingham, England starting the month following the World Championships, Van Niekerk ranked first in the preliminaries of the 50-metre breaststroke, setting a new Games record with her time of 29.82 seconds and qualifying for the semifinals. She lowered her Games record to a 29.80 in the semifinals, qualifying for the final ranking first. In the final the following day, she won the gold medal with a Games record time of 29.73 seconds. Her gold medal was the first medal of any kind for South Africa at the 2022 Commonwealth Games in any sport.

Day four, Van Niekerk qualified for the semifinals of the 100-metre breaststroke with a 1:06.40 in the morning preliminaries, which was 0.70 seconds ahead of second-ranked Tatjana Schoenmaker. Swimming under the 1:06.00 threshold for the first time at a Commonwealth Games in the semifinals with a time of 1:05.96, she qualified for the final of the event along with fellow South Africans Tatjana Schoenmaker, who ranked second, and Kaylene Corbett, who ranked seventh. She won the gold medal in the final with a personal best time of 1:05.47. Later in the session, she helped set new African and South African records in the 4×100-metre mixed medley relay in the final, splitting a 1:05.41 to contribute to the new records's time of 3:44.38 and help place fourth. Day six of six, she split a 1:05.56 in the final of the 4×100-metre medley relay, contributing to a fourth-place finish less than two-tenths of a second behind the team from England in a new African and South African record time of 3:59.63.

==== 2022 South Africa National Championships (SC) ====
At the 2022 South Africa Short Course Championships, held in mid-August in Pietermaritzburg, Van Niekerk set a new African record in the 50-metre breaststroke with a time of 29.62 seconds, which doubled as a qualifying time for the 2022 World Short Course Swimming Championships. Prior to setting the new record and winning the gold medal in the evening final, she set a new record of 29.67 seconds in the morning preliminaries heats. She also achieved a qualifying time, and the national title, in the 200-metre breaststroke with a personal best time of 2:22.75. Earlier in the Championships, she achieved qualifying and personal best times in the 100-metre breaststroke twice, first in the preliminaries heats with a time of 1:04.92, and second in the final of the event with a 1:04.89 to win the gold medal and national title.

==== 2022 World Short Course Championships ====
2022 World Championships (SC)
Silver medal – second place	50 m breaststroke	29.09 (AF)

On day two of the 2022 World Short Course Championships in December, Van Niekerk ranked second in the preliminaries of the 100 metre breaststroke at the Melbourne Sports and Aquatic Centre with a personal best time of 1:03.93, advancing to the semifinals. For the evening session, she tied for fifth-rank in the semifinals with a time of 1:04.36 and qualified for the final. She placed fifth in the final the following day with a time of 1:04.12. The fifth morning, she ranked third in the preliminaries of the 50 metre breaststroke, setting a new African record with a time of 29.45 seconds and qualifying for the semifinals. In the evening, she lowered the African record to 29.27 seconds and qualified for the final ranking third. She won the first silver medal for South Africa at the competition, and the second silver medal for South Africa in the female event following Penelope Heyns in 1999, in the final, finishing in a new African record time of 29.09 seconds.

=== 2023 ===
At the long course 2023 South African National Championships in April in Gqeberha, Van Niekerk achieved a 2023 World Aquatics Championships qualifying time in the 100-metre breaststroke on day one with a time of 1:06.96 and overall rank of first in the morning preliminaries. She improved her qualifying time to a 1:06.74 in the final, winning the silver medal. On the fourth day, she won the gold medal and national title in the 50-metre breaststroke with a World Championships qualifying time of 29.78 seconds, which was 0.93 seconds faster than the next-fastest competitor. On the final day of the 2023 Mare Nostrum tour, 21 May, she won the gold medal in the 50-metre breaststroke with a tour record time of 29.75 seconds.

== International championships (50 m) ==
Meet	50 breaststroke	100 breaststroke	200 breaststroke	4×100 medley relay	4×100 mixed medley relay
Junior level
AJC 2017 (age: 13)	(gold) (33.16)	(gold) (1:12.13)	(silver) (2:38.68)	(gold) (relay - 4:26.97)	(gold) (relay - 4:16.00)
WJC 2019 (age: 16)	4th (31.12)	20th (1:10.95)	30th (2:36.91)	10th (relay - 4:15.71)	
Senior level
AC 2018 (age: 15)	(gold) (31.99 CR)	(gold) (1:11.13)	(gold) (2:35.25)	(gold) (relay - 4:12.83)	
WC 2022 (age: 19)	(bronze) (29.90)	13th (1:06.75)			
CG 2022 (age: 19)	(gold) (29.73 GR)	(gold) (1:05.47)		4th (relay - 3:59.63 AF)	4th (relay - 3:44.38 AF)

== International championships (25 m) ==
Meet	50 breaststroke	100 breaststroke
WC 2022 (age: 19)	(silver) (29.09 AF)	5th (1:04.12)

== Personal best times ==
=== Long course metres (50 m pool) ===
Event	Time		Meet	Location	Date	Notes	Ref
50 m breaststroke	29.72	h	2022 SA National Swimming Championships	Gqeberha	6 April 2022	AF, NR, CR	
100 m breaststroke	1:05.47		2022 Commonwealth Games	Birmingham, England	2 August 2022		
200 m breaststroke	2:31.30		2021 South Africa Grand Prix No. 4	Durban	29 May 2021		

Legend: AF – African record; NR – South African record; CR – Commonwealth record

=== Short course metres (25 m pool) ===
Event	Time		Meet	Location	Date	Notes	Ref
50 m breaststroke	29.09		2022 World Short Course Championships	Melbourne, Australia	18 December 2022	AF, NR	
100 m breaststroke	1:03.93	h	2022 World Short Course Championships	Melbourne, Australia	14 December 2022		
200 m breaststroke	2:22.75		2022 South Africa National Short Course Championships	Pietermaritzburg	14 August 2022		

Legend: AF – African record; NR – South African record

== Continental and national records ==
=== Long course metres (50 m pool) ===
No.	Event	Time		Meet	Location	Date	Type	Status	Notes	Ref
1	50 m breaststroke	29.88		2021 Northern Tigers Swimming Championships	Pretoria	20 December 2021	AF, NR	Former	Former CR	
2	50 m breaststroke (2)	29.72	h	2022 SA National Swimming Championships	Gqeberha	6 April 2022	AF, NR	Current	CR	
3	4×100 m mixed medley	3:44.38		2022 Commonwealth Games	Birmingham, England	2 August 2022	AF, NR	Current		
4	4×100 m medley	3:59.63		2022 Commonwealth Games	Birmingham, England	3 August 2022	AF, NR	Current		

Legend: AF – African record; CR – Commonwealth record; NR – South African record;
Records not set in finals: h – heat; sf – semifinal; r – relay 1st leg; rh – relay heat 1st leg; b – B final; † – en route to final mark; so – swim-off; tt – time trial

=== Short course metres (25 m pool) ===
No.	Event	Time		Meet	Location	Date	Type	Status	Ref
1	50 m breaststroke	30.06	h	2021 South Africa National Short Course Championships	Pietermaritzburg	16 September 2021	AF, NR	Former	
2	50 m breaststroke (2)	29.85		2021 South Africa National Short Course Championships	Pietermaritzburg	16 September 2021	AF, NR	Former	
3	50 m breaststroke (3)	29.67	h	2022 South Africa National Short Course Championships	Pietermaritzburg	13 August 2022	AF, NR	Former	
4	50 m breaststroke (4)	29.62		2022 South Africa National Short Course Championships	Pietermaritzburg	13 August 2022	AF, NR	Former	
5	50 m breaststroke (5)	29.45	h	2022 World Short Course Championships	Melbourne, Australia	17 December 2022	AF, NR	Former	
6	50 m breaststroke (6)	29.27	sf	2022 World Short Course Championships	Melbourne, Australia	17 December 2022	AF, NR	Former	
7	50 m breaststroke (7)	29.09		2022 World Short Course Championships	Melbourne, Australia	18 December 2022	AF, NR	Current	

Legend: AF – African record; NR – South African record;
Records not set in finals: h – heat; sf – semifinal; r – relay 1st leg; rh – relay heat 1st leg; b – B final; † – en route to final mark; so – swim-off; tt – time trial

== Awards and honours ==
- GSport Award, Momentum Athlete of the Year: 2022 (awarded 14 September 2022)
- GSport Award, Global Woman in Sport: 2022 (awarded 14 September 2022)
- GSport Award honour, Ministerial Recognition of Excellence: 2022 (awarded 14 September 2022)
- Gauteng Sport Award finalist, Sportswoman of the Year: 2022 (announced 3 November 2022)
- Gauteng Sport Award finalist, Sport Personality of the Year: 2022 (announced 3 November 2022)
- Swimming World, Female African Swimmer of the Year: 2022 (awarded 24 December 2022)
- Swammy Award, African Female Swimmer of the Year: 2022 (awarded 27 December 2022)
- SA Sports Award, Sportswoman of the Year: 2022 (awarded 25 March 2023)

== See also ==
- List of African records in swimming
