= Telkom SA National Aquatic Championships =

Aquatics competition in South Africa

The Telkom SA National Aquatic Championships is a yearly open competition event in South Africa which incorporates all aquatic disciplines under the auspices of Swimming South Africa: swimming, water polo, diving, synchronized swimming and open water swimming. The events are held in major cities across South Africa in April and provide the basis for selection for teams to represent South Africa and compete at the FINA World Championships, All Africa Games, Commonwealth Games and the Olympic Games. Each sport has its own championships, for example the 2022 SA National Swimming Championships, which combined are a given year's Telkom SA National Aquatic Championships.

== Editions ==
=== 2016–2021 ===
Year	Championships	Venue	Location	Dates	Results
2016	2016 SA National Open Water Championships 2016 SA National Water Polo Championships 2016 SA National Artistic Swimming Championships 2016 SA National Swimming Championships 2016 SA National Youth Swimming Championships 2016 SA National Diving Championships	Eikenhof Dam – Kings Park Aquatic Centre Kings Park Aquatic Centre Kings Park Aquatic Centre Kings Park Aquatic Centre	Grabouw – Durban Durban Durban Durban	5–6 March 31 March – 3 April 7–10 April 10–16 April 10–16 April 12–15	completed completed completed completed completed completed
2017	2017 SA National Open Water Championships 2017 SA National Water Polo Championships 2017 SA National Artistic Swimming Championships 2017 SA National Swimming Championships 2017 SA National Junior Swimming Championships 2017 SA National Diving Championships	Marina Martinique Stellenbosch University Kings Park Aquatic Centre Kings Park Aquatic Centre Kings Park Aquatic Centre Kings Park Aquatic Centre	Jeffreys Bay Stellenbosch Durban Durban Durban Durban	4–5 March 17–21 March 1–4 April 3–8 April 3–8 April 5–9 April	completed completed completed completed completed completed
2018	2018 SA National Open Water Championships 2018 SA National Water Polo Championships 2018 SA National Artistic Swimming Championships 2018 SA National Swimming Championships 2018 SA National Junior Swimming Championships 2018 SA National Diving Championships	Marina Martinique St Stithians College Newton Park Swimming Pool Newton Park Swimming Pool Kings Park Aquatic Centre De Jong Diving Centre	Jeffreys Bay Johannesburg Port Elizabeth Port Elizabeth Durban Pretoria	3–4 March 5–8 April 19–22 April 23–28 April 21–25 March 17–19 April	completed completed completed completed completed completed
2019	2019 SA National Open Water Championships 2019 SA National Water Polo Championships 2019 SA National Artistic Swimming Championships 2019 SA National Swimming Championships 2019 SA National Junior Swimming Championships 2019 SA National Diving Championships	Marina Martinique – Kings Park Aquatic Centre Kings Park Aquatic Centre Kings Park Aquatic Centre Kings Park Aquatic Centre	Jeffreys Bay Gauteng Durban Durban Durban Durban	2–3 March – 5–9 April 8–12 April 8–12 April 10–14 April	completed completed completed completed completed completed
2020	2020 SA National Open Water Championships	Marina Martinique	Jeffreys Bay	7–8 March	completed
2021	2021 SA National Open Water Championships 2021 SA National Water Polo Championships 2021 SA National Artistic Swimming Championships 2021 SA National Swimming Championships 2021 SA National Junior Swimming Championships 2021 SA National Diving Championships	Marina Martinique cancelled Newton Park Swimming Pool Newton Park Swimming Pool Newton Park Swimming Pool –	Jeffreys Bay cancelled Port Elizabeth Port Elizabeth Port Elizabeth Gauteng	3–4 March cancelled 1–6 April 7–12 April 7–12 April 1–6 April	completed n/a completed completed completed completed

=== 2022–2024 ===
The following are the planned Championships for 2022 thru 2024.

Year	Championships	Venue	Location	Dates	Results
2022	2022 SA National Open Water Championships 2022 SA National Water Polo Championships 2022 SA National Artistic Swimming Championships 2022 SA National Swimming Championships 2022 SA National Junior Swimming Championships 2022 SA National Diving Championships	Marina Martinique Joan Harrison Newton Park Swimming Pool Newton Park Swimming Pool Newton Park Swimming Pool Kings Park Aquatic Centre	Jeffreys Bay Buffalo City Gqeberha Gqeberha Gqeberha Durban	4–6 March 18–21 March 3–5 April 6–11 April 6–11 April 11–15 April	completed completed completed completed completed completed
2023	2023 SA National Open Water Championships 2023 SA National Water Polo Championships 2023 SA National Artistic Swimming Championships 2023 SA National Swimming Championships 2023 SA National Junior Swimming Championships 2023 SA National Diving Championships	Marina Martinique TBC TBC Newton Park Swimming Pool Kings Park Aquatic Centre TBC	Jeffreys Bay TBC TBC Gqeberha Durban TBC	10–12 March TBC TBC 12–16 April 21–25 March TBC	completed to be competed to be competed completed completed to be competed
2024	2024 SA National Open Water Championships 2024 SA National Water Polo Championships 2024 SA National Artistic Swimming Championships 2024 SA National Swimming Championships 2024 SA National Junior Swimming Championships 2024 SA National Diving Championships	TBC TBC TBC TBC TBC TBC	TBC TBC TBC TBC TBC TBC	TBC 1–3 March TBC TBC 3–8 April 9–13 April TBC	to be competed to be competed to be competed to be competed to be competed to be competed

== 2011 ==
In 2011, the open water swimming was held at Marina Martinique, Jeffreys Bay from 17–18 April.

M/V	Event	Gold	Time	Silver	Time	Bronze	Time
Men	3 km	(South Africa) Danie Marais	2:24:11.79	(South Africa) Jan Petrus van der Merwe	36:19.29	(South Africa) Martin Binedell	36:56.98
Men	5 km	(South Africa) Troyden Prinsloo	55:44.12	(South Africa) Chad Ho	55:44.44	(South Africa) Danie Marais	56:06.00
Men	10 km	(South Africa) Troyden Prinsloo (South Africa) Chad Ho	1:57:18.37			(South Africa) Michael Marais	2:24:11.79
Women	3 km	(South Africa) Michelle Weber	37:25.09	(South Africa) Nina Nicholas	37:54.56	(South Africa) Dominique Dryding	38:04.62
Women	5 km	(South Africa) Natalie Du Toit	1:00:27.09	(South Africa) Michelle Weber	1:01:23.33	(South Africa) Nicole Brits	1:02:43.50
Women	10 km	(South Africa) Natalie Du Toit	2:02:21.21	(South Africa) Jessica Roux	2:09:30.70	(South Africa) Nicole Brits	2:11:07.38

In 2011, the event was held on 11–16 April at Newton Park, Port Elizabeth.

== See also ==
- Sport in South Africa
- List of swimming competitions
