= Swimming at the 2025 Summer World University Games – Women's 100 metre breaststroke =

Women's 100 metre breaststroke at the 2025 Summer World University Games
- Venue: Schwimm- und Sprunghalle im Europasportpark
- Location: Berlin
- Dates: 22 July (heats and semifinals); 23 July (final)
- Competitors: 44 from 31 nations

Medalists
gold medal	Emma Weber	United States
silver medal	Barbara Mazurkiewicz	Poland
bronze medal	Shona Branton	Canada

The women's 100 metre breaststroke at the 2025 Summer World University Games in Rhine-Ruhr, Germany was held from 22 to 23 July 2025. Emma Weber from the United States won the gold medal, Barbara Mazurkiewicz from Poland took the silver medal and Shona Branton from Canada earned the bronze medal.

== Schedule ==
All times are Central European Time (UTC+1)

Date	Time	Round
22 July	10:12	Heats
22 July	20:16	Semifinals
23 July	19:08	Final

== Records ==
Prior to the competition, the world and Universiade records were as follows.

Category	Swimmer	Record	Date	Place	Event
World record	(United States) Lilly King	1:04.13	25 July 2017	Budapest, Hungary	2017 World Championships
Universiade record	(Russia) Yuliya Yefimova	1:05.48	12 July 2013	Kazan, Russia	2013 Summer Universiade

== Results ==
=== Heats ===
All entered athletes competed across multiple seeded heats in the morning session. Swimmers with the top 16 fastest times advanced, regardless of which individual heat they swam.

Rank	Heat	Lane	Swimmer	Nation	Time	Notes
1	6	4	Emma Weber	United States	1:07.65	Q
2	6	3	Simone Moll	South Africa	1:07.87	Q
3	5	4	Shona Branton	Canada	1:08.58	Q
4	4	3	Barbara Mazurkiewicz	Poland	1:08.80	Q
5	4	6	Lara van Niekerk	South Africa	1:08.92	Q
6	6	5	Yuyumi Obatake	Japan	1:08.94	Q
7	6	6	Moa Bergdahl	Sweden	1:09.05	Q
8	4	5	Anna Morgan	Great Britain	1:09.41	Q
9	4	4	Francesca Zucca	Italy	1:09.48	Q
10	4	7	Anniina Murto	Finland	1:09.63	Q
11	5	7	Jenna Pulkkinen	Finland	1:09.66	Q
12	5	6	Sára Bozsó	Hungary	1:09.70	Q
13	6	1	Chiara Della Corte	Italy	1:09.97	Q
14	5	3	Aliz Kalmár	Hungary	1:10.13	Q
15	6	7	Yumeno Kusuda	Japan	1:10.23	Q
16	6	2	Kyla Brown	Australia	1:10.32	Q
17	5	1	Aina Fernández	Spain	1:10.39	
18	5	5	Piper Enge	United States	1:11.03	
19	4	8	Maria Erokhina	Cyprus	1:11.07	
20	5	2	Hazal Özkan	Turkey	1:11.25	
20	6	8	Kim Herkle	Germany	1:11.25	
22	5	8	Lam Hoi Kiu	Hong Kong	1:11.26	
23	3	3	Megan Sng	Hong Kong	1:11.61	
24	3	7	Elle Tay	Singapore	1:11.70	
24	3	5	Nina Vadovičová	Slovakia	1:11.70	
26	3	4	Anastasia Basisto	Moldova	1:12.11	
27	3	6	Hung Chieh-yu	Chinese Taipei	1:12.15	
28	3	2	Melanie Chong	Singapore	1:12.66	
29	3	8	Sara Mihalič	Slovenia	1:12.84	
30	4	1	Martina Barbeito	Argentina	1:12.85	
31	2	3	Hanna-Marleen Mõtsnik	Estonia	1:13.94	
32	3	1	Kwon Woo-jin	South Korea	1:14.21	
33	2	7	Naga Vasupalli	India	1:16.32	
34	2	4	Marie Toompuu	Estonia	1:17.18	
35	2	5	Antonia Cubillos	Chile	1:17.92	
36	2	2	Marija Goberga	Latvia	1:18.69	
37	2	1	Divyanka Pradhan	India	1:19.02	
38	2	6	Mia Martinicorena	Argentina	1:19.31	
39	1	3	Karen Barros	Ecuador	1:20.70	
40	2	8	Florencia Orpis	Chile	1:20.98	
41	1	5	Edith Camacho	Mexico	1:22.21	
42	1	6	Dayanna Barreto	Ecuador	1:23.70	
43	1	4	Kong Sin Ian	Macau	1:23.75	
—	1	2	Paige van der Westhuizen	Zimbabwe	DNS	

=== Semifinals ===
The 16 advancing swimmers were split into two semifinal heats of 8 during the evening session. The swimmers recording the top 8 fastest times advanced to the final round.

Rank	Heat	Lane	Swimmer	Nation	Time	Notes
1	2	4	Emma Weber	United States	1:07.28	Q
2	2	5	Shona Branton	Canada	1:07.82	Q
3	1	4	Simone Moll	South Africa	1:07.94	Q
4	1	5	Barbara Mazurkiewicz	Poland	1:08.15	Q
5	1	1	Aliz Kalmár	Hungary	1:08.31	Q
6	2	3	Lara van Niekerk	South Africa	1:08.46	Q
7	2	2	Francesca Zucca	Italy	1:08.89	Q
8	1	3	Yuyumi Obatake	Japan	1:09.05	Q
9	1	6	Anna Morgan	Great Britain	1:09.23	
10	2	6	Moa Bergdahl	Sweden	1:09.34	
11	2	7	Jenna Pulkkinen	Finland	1:09.38	
12	1	7	Sára Bozsó	Hungary	1:09.50	
13	2	1	Chiara Della Corte	Italy	1:09.57	
14	1	2	Anniina Murto	Finland	1:09.92	
15	2	8	Yumeno Kusuda	Japan	1:10.10	
16	1	8	Kyla Brown	Australia	1:10.19	

=== Final ===
The fastest 8 swimmers competed in a single race to determine the gold, silver and bronze medalists.

Rank	Lane	Swimmer	Nation	Time	Notes
1st place, gold medalist(s)	4	Emma Weber	United States	1:07.09	
2nd place, silver medalist(s)	6	Barbara Mazurkiewicz	Poland	1:07.57	
3rd place, bronze medalist(s)	5	Shona Branton	Canada	1:07.75	
4	2	Aliz Kalmár	Hungary	1:08.10	
5	1	Francesca Zucca	Italy	1:08.11	
6	7	Lara van Niekerk	South Africa	1:08.30	
7	3	Simone Moll	South Africa	1:08.32	
8	8	Yuyumi Obatake	Japan	1:09.29	
