= 2018 African Swimming Championships – Women's 50 metre breaststroke =

Women's 50 metre breaststroke at the 2018 African Swimming Championships
- Venue: Mohamed Boudiaf Olympic Complex
- Dates: 12 September (heats and final)
- Competitors: 15 from 11 nations
- Winning time: 31.99

Medalists
gold medal	Lara van Niekerk	South Africa
silver medal	Tilka Paljk	Zambia
bronze medal	Jade Simons	South Africa

The Women's 50 metre breaststroke competition of the 2018 African Swimming Championships was held on 12 September 2018.

== Records ==
Prior to the competition, the existing world and championship records were as follows.

	Name	Nation	Time	Location	Date
World record	Lilly King	United States	29.40	Budapest	30 July 2017
African record	Tatjana Schoenmaker	South Africa	30.82	Gold Coast	6 April 2018
Championship record	Kaylene Corbett	South Africa	32.58	Bloemfontein	18 October 2016

The following new records were set during this competition.

Date	Event	Name	Nationality	Time	Record
12 September	Heat	Tilka Paljk	Zambia	32.06	CR
12 September	Final	Lara van Niekerk	South Africa	31.99	CR

== Results ==
=== Heats ===
The heats were started on 12 September at 10:15.

Rank	Name	Nationality	Time	Notes
1	Tilka Paljk	Zambia	32.06	Q CR
2	Lara van Niekerk	South Africa	32.25	Q
3	Jade Simons	South Africa	33.77	Q
4	Rowida Hesham	Egypt	33.87	Q
5	Habiba Belghith	Tunisia	33.99	Q
6	Imane El Barodi	Morocco	34.10	Q
7	Rebecca Kamau	Kenya	35.09	Q
8	Tessa Ip Hen Cheung	Mauritius	35.11	Q
9	Hamida Rania Nefsi	Algeria	35.12	
10	Meriem Cheikh	Algeria	35.47	
11	Hiba Laknit	Morocco	36.02	
12	Samantha Rakotovelo	Madagascar	38.02	
	Jannat Bique	Mozambique	Did not start	
	Evelyn Nmor	Nigeria	Did not start	
	Nkem Chukwuemeke	Nigeria	Did not start	

=== Final ===
The final was started on 12 September.

Rank	Lane	Name	Nationality	Time	Notes
1st place, gold medalist(s)	5	Lara van Niekerk	South Africa	31.99	CR
2nd place, silver medalist(s)	4	Tilka Paljk	Zambia	32.15	
3rd place, bronze medalist(s)	3	Jade Simons	South Africa	33.10	
4	6	Rowida Hesham	Egypt	33.64	
5	2	Habiba Belghith	Tunisia	34.17	
6	7	Imane El Barodi	Morocco	34.36	
7	1	Rebecca Kamau	Kenya	34.50	
8	8	Tessa Ip Hen Cheung	Mauritius	34.73	
