= Swimming at the 2022 Commonwealth Games – Women's 100 metre breaststroke =

Women's 100 metre breaststroke

Women's 100 metre breaststroke at the 2022 Commonwealth Games
- Venue: Sandwell Aquatics Centre
- Dates: 1 August (heats, semifinals); 2 August (final)
- Competitors: 28 from 20 nations
- Winning time: 1:05.47

Medalists
gold medal	Lara van Niekerk	South Africa
silver medal	Tatjana Schoenmaker	South Africa
bronze medal	Chelsea Hodges	Australia

The women's 100 metre breaststroke event at the 2022 Commonwealth Games was held on 1 and 2 August at the Sandwell Aquatics Centre.

== Records ==
Prior to this competition, the existing world, Commonwealth and Games records were as follows:

World record	Lilly King (USA)	1:04.13	Budapest, Hungary	25 July 2017
Commonwealth record	Tatjana Schoenmaker (RSA)	1:04.82	Tokyo, Japan	25 July 2021
Games record	Leisel Jones (AUS)	1:05.09	Melbourne, Australia	20 March 2006

== Schedule ==
The schedule is as follows:

All times are British Summer Time (UTC+1)

Date	Time	Round
Monday 1 August 2022	11:36	Qualifying
Monday 1 August 2022	21:04	Semifinals
Tuesday 2 August 2022	19:07	Final

== Results ==
=== Heats ===
Rank	Heat	Lane	Name	Nationality	Time	Notes
1	3	4	Lara van Niekerk	South Africa	1:06.40	Q
2	4	4	Tatjana Schoenmaker	South Africa	1:07.10	Q
3	3	5	Molly Renshaw	England	1:07.54	Q
4	2	4	Chelsea Hodges	Australia	1:07.68	Q
5	4	5	Jenna Strauch	Australia	1:07.80	Q
6	4	3	Abbey Harkin	Australia	1:07.85	Q
7	3	3	Kara Hanlon	Scotland	1:07.99	Q
8	2	6	Kaylene Corbett	South Africa	1:08.12	Q
9	2	3	Sophie Angus	Canada	1:08.99	Q
9	4	6	Imogen Clark	England	1:08.99	Q
11	3	6	Letitia Sim	Singapore	1:09.29	Q
12	2	5	Sarah Vasey	England	1:09.62	Q
13	2	2	Laura Kinley	Isle of Man	1:10.66	Q
14	4	2	Phee Jinq En	Malaysia	1:11.32	Q
15	4	7	Lanihei Connolly	Cook Islands	1:11.90	Q
16	3	2	Lillian Higgs	Bahamas	1:12.67	Q
17	4	1	Tessa Ip Hen Cheung	Mauritius	1:13.99	R
18	3	7	Kirsten Fisher-Marsters	Cook Islands	1:15.02	R
19	2	1	Tilka Paljk	Zambia	1:15.26	
20	3	8	Laura le Cras	Guernsey	1:15.27	
21	2	8	Asia Kent	Gibraltar	1:15.80	
22	4	8	Kelera Mudunasoko	Fiji	1:16.23	
23	3	1	Rhanishka Gibbs	Bahamas	1:18.44	
24	1	4	Mst Morium Akter	Bangladesh	1:20.37	
25	1	5	Tia Gun-Munro	Saint Vincent and the Grenadines	1:22.01	
26	1	3	Mishael Aisha Hyat Ayub	Pakistan	1:22.12	
27	1	6	Brooke Yon	Saint Helena	1:22.99	
28	1	2	Vaoahi Afu	Tonga	1:29.31	
	2	7	Mackenzie Headley	Jamaica	DNS	

=== Semifinals ===
Rank	Heat	Lane	Name	Nationality	Time	Notes
1	2	4	Lara van Niekerk	South Africa	1:05.96	Q
2	1	4	Tatjana Schoenmaker	South Africa	1:06.43	Q
3	1	5	Chelsea Hodges	Australia	1:07.16	Q
4	2	3	Jenna Strauch	Australia	1:07.30	Q
5	2	5	Molly Renshaw	England	1:07.42	Q
6	1	3	Abbey Harkin	Australia	1:07.61	Q
7	1	6	Kaylene Corbett	South Africa	1:07.96	Q
8	2	6	Kara Hanlon	Scotland	1:08.08	Q
9	2	7	Letitia Sim	Singapore	1:08.58	R
10	1	2	Imogen Clark	England	1:08.60	R
11	2	2	Sophie Angus	Canada	1:08.63	
12	1	7	Sarah Vasey	England	1:09.05	
13	2	1	Laura Kinley	Isle of Man	1:10.77	
14	1	1	Phee Jinq En	Malaysia	1:11.42	
15	2	8	Lanihei Connolly	Cook Islands	1:11.76	
16	1	8	Lillian Higgs	Bahamas	1:12.97	

=== Final ===
Rank	Lane	Name	Nationality	Time	Notes
1st place, gold medalist(s)	4	Lara van Niekerk	South Africa	1:05.47	
2nd place, silver medalist(s)	5	Tatjana Schoenmaker	South Africa	1:06.68	
3rd place, bronze medalist(s)	3	Chelsea Hodges	Australia	1:07.05	
4	2	Molly Renshaw	England	1:07.36	
5	7	Abbey Harkin	Australia	1:07.47	
6	6	Jenna Strauch	Australia	1:07.60	
7	1	Kaylene Corbett	South Africa	1:07.62	
8	8	Kara Hanlon	Scotland	1:08.67	
