= Swimming at the 2025 Summer World University Games – Women's 50 metre breaststroke =

Women's 50 metre breaststroke at the 2025 Summer World University Games
- Venue: Schwimm- und Sprunghalle im Europasportpark
- Location: Berlin
- Dates: 18 July (heats and semifinals); 19 July (final)
- Competitors: 45 from 32 nations

Medalists
gold medal	Emma Weber	United States
silver medal	Lara van Niekerk	South Africa
bronze medal	Barbara Mazurkiewicz	Poland

The women's 50 metre breaststroke at the 2025 Summer World University Games in Rhine-Ruhr, Germany was held from 18 to 19 July 2025. Emma Weber from the United States won the gold medal, Lara van Niekerk from South Africa took the silver medal and Barbara Mazurkiewicz from Poland earned the bronze medal.

== Schedule ==
All times are Central European Time (UTC+1)

Date	Time	Round
18 July	10:40	Heats
18 July	19:52	Semifinals
19 July	19:35	Final

== Records ==
Prior to the competition, the world and Universiade records were as follows.

Category	Swimmer	Record	Date	Place	Event
World record	(Lithuania) Rūta Meilutytė	29.16	30 July 2023	Fukuoka, Japan	2023 World Championships
Universiade record	(Russia) Yuliya Yefimova	30.12	16 July 2013	Kazan, Russia	2013 Summer Universiade

== Results ==
=== Heats ===
All entered athletes competed across multiple seeded heats in the morning session. Swimmers with the top 16 fastest times advanced, regardless of which individual heat they swam.

Rank	Heat	Lane	Swimmer	Nation	Time	Notes
1	6	4	Emma Weber	United States	30.79	Q
2	6	3	Lara van Niekerk	South Africa	30.90	Q
3	4	4	Barbara Mazurkiewicz	Poland	31.10	Q
4	5	5	Anna Morgan	Great Britain	31.12	Q
5	5	4	Piper Enge	United States	31.14	Q
5	6	5	Shona Branton	Canada	31.14	Q
7	6	6	Yuyumi Obatake	Japan	31.17	Q
8	5	3	Simone Moll	South Africa	31.29	Q
9	5	6	Sára Bozsó	Hungary	31.40	Q
10	6	2	Aliz Kalmár	Hungary	31.48	Q
11	4	6	Jenna Pulkkinen	Finland	31.55	Q
12	4	5	Iana Shakirova	Individual Neutral Athletes	31.66	Q
13	5	1	Chiara Della Corte	Italy	31.84	Q
14	6	7	Chiu Yi-chen	Chinese Taipei	31.85	Q
15	4	2	Kyla Brown	Australia	31.87	Q
16	5	2	Moa Bergdahl	Sweden	31.88	Q
17	4	3	Kiia Metsäkonkola	Finland	31.93	
18	5	7	Francesca Zucca	Italy	32.02	
19	4	7	Ashley McMillan	Canada	32.06	
20	4	8	Maria Erokhina	Cyprus	32.56	
21	3	2	Hazal Özkan	Turkey	32.62	
22	3	5	Lee Seung-gyeong	South Korea	32.78	
23	5	8	Nina Vadovičová	Slovakia	32.88	
24	4	1	Anastasia Basisto	Moldova	32.99	
25	3	6	Hanna-Marleen Mõtsnik	Estonia	33.00	
26	6	8	Lam Hoi Kiu	Hong Kong	33.01	
27	3	3	Hung Chieh-yu	Chinese Taipei	33.17	
28	2	3	Elle Tay	Singapore	33.19	
29	2	4	Melanie Chong	Singapore	33.21	
30	3	8	Sara Mihalič	Slovenia	33.29	
31	3	7	Kwon Woo-jin	South Korea	33.30	
32	3	4	Adrianna Szwabińska	Poland	33.38	
33	6	1	Martina Barbeito	Argentina	33.40	
34	2	6	Naga Vasupalli	India	34.66	
35	2	1	Rithvika Mittapalli	India	34.78	
36	3	1	Mia Martinicorena	Argentina	35.06	
37	2	7	Marija Goberga	Latvia	35.22	
38	1	2	Florencia Orpis	Chile	36.28	
39	1	4	Karen Barros	Ecuador	36.48	
40	2	2	Kong Sin Ian	Macau	36.95	
41	2	8	Edith Camacho	Mexico	37.25	
42	1	5	Dayanna Barreto	Ecuador	38.14	
43	1	3	Altjin Amgalan	Mongolia	48.79	
44	1	6	Dorah Nankunda	Uganda	49.57	
—	2	5	Paige van der Westhuizen	Zimbabwe	DNS	

=== Semifinals ===
The 16 advancing swimmers were split into two semifinal heats of 8 during the evening session. The swimmers recording the top 8 fastest times advanced to the final round.

Rank	Heat	Lane	Swimmer	Nation	Time	Notes
1	2	4	Emma Weber	United States	30.53	Q
2	2	5	Barbara Mazurkiewicz	Poland	30.63	Q
3	1	4	Lara van Niekerk	South Africa	30.64	Q
4	2	3	Piper Enge	United States	31.01	Q
5	1	6	Simone Moll	South Africa	31.21	Q
6	1	7	Iana Shakirova	Individual Neutral Athletes	31.23	Q
7	1	3	Shona Branton	Canada	31.25	Q
8	2	1	Chiara Della Corte	Italy	31.45	SO
8	1	5	Anna Morgan	Great Britain	31.45	SO
10	2	7	Jenna Pulkkinen	Finland	31.54	
10	2	2	Sára Bozsó	Hungary	31.54	
12	1	8	Moa Bergdahl	Sweden	31.55	
13	2	6	Yuyumi Obatake	Japan	31.58	
14	1	2	Aliz Kalmár	Hungary	31.65	
15	2	8	Kyla Brown	Australia	31.67	
16	1	1	Chiu Yi-chen	Chinese Taipei	32.15	

=== Swim-off ===
The winner advanced to the final.

Rank	Lane	Swimmer	Nation	Time	Notes
1	5	Chiara Della Corte	Italy	31.23	Q
2	4	Anna Morgan	Great Britain	31.37	

=== Final ===
The fastest 8 swimmers competed in a single race to determine the gold, silver and bronze medalists.

Rank	Lane	Swimmer	Nation	Time	Notes
1st place, gold medalist(s)	4	Emma Weber	United States	30.61	
2nd place, silver medalist(s)	3	Lara van Niekerk	South Africa	30.68	
3rd place, bronze medalist(s)	5	Barbara Mazurkiewicz	Poland	30.76	
4	2	Simone Moll	South Africa	30.98	
5	6	Piper Enge	United States	31.08	
6	1	Shona Branton	Canada	31.18	
7	7	Iana Shakirova	Individual Neutral Athletes	31.38	
8	8	Chiara Della Corte	Italy	31.68	
