= Emma Weber =

American swimmer

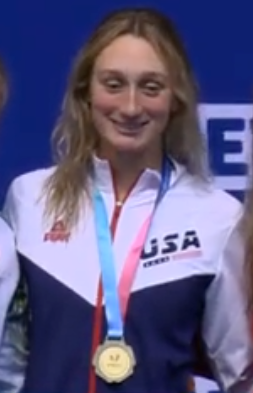
- At the 2025 Summer World University Games

Personal information
- Full name: Emma Lebron Weber
- Born: January 2004 (age 22) Denver, Colorado, U.S.
- Height: 5 ft 11 (176cm)
- Weight: 140 lb (64 kg)

Sport
- Country: United States
- Sport: Women's swimming
- Strokes: Breaststroke
- Club: Denver Hilltoppers
- College team: University of Virginia
- Coach: Nick Frasersmith (Regis Jesuit); Todd DeSorbo (Virginia)
Medal record
Women's swimming
Representing the United States
Olympic Games
Gold medal – first place	2024 Paris	4×100 m medley
World Championships (SC)
Gold medal – first place	2024 Budapest	4×100 m medley
Pan American Games
Silver medal – second place	2023 Santiago	4×100 m medley
World University Games
Gold medal – first place	2025 Rhine-Ruhr	50 m breaststroke
Gold medal – first place	2025 Rhine-Ruhr	100 m breaststroke
Gold medal – first place	2025 Rhine-Ruhr	4x100 m medley

Emma Lebron Weber (born 2004) is an American competitive swimmer who competed for the University of Virginia and participated in the 2024 Summer Olympics where she won a gold-medal in the Women's 4×100 m medley. She competed at the 2023 Pan American Games where she won a silver medal for the United States and at the 2025 World University Games where she won three gold medals.

== Early-life ==
Weber was born in Denver, Colorado to Kurt and Deidre Weber. From an athletic family, Weber's mother Deidre ran High School track. Emma attended Fairview High School in Boulder, but by her Senior year transferred to Regis Jesuit, a co-ed Catholic private preparatory school in greater Denver, where she graduated in 2022. Regis Jesuit had a stronger swim program than Fairview, and after her transfer, she was closer to her club team, the Denver Hilltoppers. At Regis Jesuit, she was coached by Nick Frasersmith, who had previously coached Olympic swimmers Missy Franklin and Clark Smith.

In Thornton, Colorado in March 2021, Weber captured Class 5A Colorado state championships in both the 200-yard individual medley with a time of 2:01.71 and the 100-yard breaststroke with a state record time of 59.93, making her the first Colorado high school girl's swimmer to go under 1 minute for the 100 breaststroke.

In an interview with The Denver Post, Weber cited Missy Franklin, who had earlier attended Regis Jesuit, as an early-inspiration for her, and often visualized going to the Olympics like her.

Qualifying as a high school junior for the June 2021 Olympic trials in Eugene, Oregon, Weber finished 12th overall in her event, failing to qualify for the U.S. team.

== University of Virginia ==
Weber competed for the NCAA division-one, University of Virginia Cavaliers swimming and diving team under head coach, Todd DeSorbo from 2023-2026. In 2025, she was enrolled in the UVA College of Arts and Sciences. From 2023-25, Emma was an All American in the 100 or 200 breaststroke in three successive years, and received All Atlantic Coast Conference honors in the 100 breaststroke in the same three years. During Weber's years of tenure with the University of Virginia Women's swim team under DeSorbo, the Cavaliers won successive NCAA National championships from 2023-2025.

== 2024 Paris Olympic gold ==
At the 2024 U.S. Olympic trials in Indianapolis, in an unexpected victory, Weber placed second in the finals of the 100-meter breaststroke with a time of 1:06.10 behind Lilly King's winning 1:05.43. The second place finish qualified Weber for the U.S. Olympic team, beating defending champion Lydia Jacoby.

Weber earned a gold medal in the 2024 Olympics by swimming in the preliminaries of the Women's 4×100 m medley, helping the U.S. team to advance to the finals. After the preliminaries in the 4x100 meter medley relay finals, where Weber did not swim, the team of Regan Smith on Backstroke, Lilly King on Breaststroke, Gretchen Walsh on Butterfly, and Torri Huske on Freestyle anchor swam a world record time of 3:49.63. The Australian team took the silver and the Chinese team took the bronze. Weber placed 23rd overall at the 2024 games in the Women's 100-meter breast stroke with a time of 1:07.65.

Continuing to compete after the 2024 Olympics, Weber won three golds at the 2025 Summer World University Games, with one in the 4×100 m medley, one in the 100 m breaststroke, and one in the 50 m breaststroke.
