= 2022 SA National Swimming Championships =

Swimming competition in South Africa

- Host city: Gqeberha, Eastern Cape, South Africa
- Date(s): 6–11 April 2022
- Venue(s): Newton Park Swimming Pool
- Nations participating: 9
- Events: 44 (men: 21; women: 21; mixed: 2); 18 para swimming (men: 9; women: 9)

The 2022 SA National Swimming Championships was held from 6 to 11 April 2022 in Gqeberha, South Africa at the Newton Park Swimming Pool. Events were competed in a long course (50 metres long) swimming pool. It served as a selection meet for determining the swimmers to represent South Africa at the 2022 World Aquatics Championships and 2022 Commonwealth Games. It was held concurrently with the 2022 SA National Junior Swimming Championships as part of the multi-sport 2022 Telkom SA National Aquatic Championships. The meet was open to international competition and included multi-class para swimming events.

== Event schedule ==
A total of 62 events were competed over six days, including 18 para swimming events. For para swimming events, men and women had the same schedule. Heats started at 07:30 on days one and four, and started at 08:30 on days two, three, five, and six. Senior finals started at 18:00 each day.

H	Heats	(gold)	Finals

M = Morning session (starting at 07:30 - days 1, 4; 08:30 - days 2, 3, 5, 6), E = Evening session (starting at 18:00 - all days)

Men
Date →	Wed 6		Thu 7		Fri 8		Sat 9		Sun 10		Mon 11	
Event ↓	M	E	M	E	M	E	M	E	M	E	M	E
50 m freestyle									H	1st place, gold medalist(s)		
100 m freestyle					H	1st place, gold medalist(s)						
200 m freestyle			H	1st place, gold medalist(s)								
400 m freestyle	H	1st place, gold medalist(s)										
800 m freestyle								1st place, gold medalist(s)				
1500 m freestyle												1st place, gold medalist(s)
50 m backstroke					H	1st place, gold medalist(s)						
100 m backstroke	H	1st place, gold medalist(s)										
200 m backstroke									H	1st place, gold medalist(s)		
50 m breaststroke							H	1st place, gold medalist(s)				
100 m breaststroke			H	1st place, gold medalist(s)								
200 m breaststroke	H	1st place, gold medalist(s)										
50 m butterfly	H	1st place, gold medalist(s)										
100 m butterfly							H	1st place, gold medalist(s)				
200 m butterfly					H	1st place, gold medalist(s)						
200 m individual medley											H	1st place, gold medalist(s)
400 m individual medley			H	1st place, gold medalist(s)								
4×50 m freestyle relay								1st place, gold medalist(s)				
4×100 m freestyle relay				1st place, gold medalist(s)								
4×200 m freestyle relay						1st place, gold medalist(s)						
4×100 m medley relay												1st place, gold medalist(s)

Women
Date →	Wed 6		Thu 7		Fri 8		Sat 9		Sun 10		Mon 11	
Event ↓	M	E	M	E	M	E	M	E	M	E	M	E
50 m freestyle			H	1st place, gold medalist(s)								
100 m freestyle							H	1st place, gold medalist(s)				
200 m freestyle	H	1st place, gold medalist(s)										
400 m freestyle											H	1st place, gold medalist(s)
800 m freestyle										1st place, gold medalist(s)		
1500 m freestyle						1st place, gold medalist(s)						
50 m backstroke									H	1st place, gold medalist(s)		
100 m backstroke			H	1st place, gold medalist(s)								
200 m backstroke							H	1st place, gold medalist(s)				
50 m breaststroke	H	1st place, gold medalist(s)										
100 m breaststroke							H	1st place, gold medalist(s)				
200 m breaststroke					H	1st place, gold medalist(s)						
50 m butterfly					H	1st place, gold medalist(s)						
100 m butterfly	H	1st place, gold medalist(s)										
200 m butterfly									H	1st place, gold medalist(s)		
200 m individual medley							H	1st place, gold medalist(s)				
400 m individual medley	H	1st place, gold medalist(s)										
4×50 m freestyle relay						1st place, gold medalist(s)						
4×100 m freestyle relay				1st place, gold medalist(s)								
4×200 m freestyle relay								1st place, gold medalist(s)				
4×100 m medley relay												1st place, gold medalist(s)

Mixed
Date →	Wed 6		Thu 7		Fri 8		Sat 9		Sun 10		Mon 11	
Event ↓	M	E	M	E	M	E	M	E	M	E	M	E
4×100 m freestyle relay		1st place, gold medalist(s)										
4×100 m medley relay										1st place, gold medalist(s)		

Para swimming (multi-class, men and women)
Date →	Wed 6		Thu 7		Fri 8		Sat 9		Sun 10		Mon 11	
Event ↓	M	E	M	E	M	E	M	E	M	E	M	E
50 m freestyle	H	1st place, gold medalist(s)										
100 m freestyle									H	1st place, gold medalist(s)		
50 m backstroke									H	1st place, gold medalist(s)		
100 m backstroke			H	1st place, gold medalist(s)								
50 m breaststroke	H	1st place, gold medalist(s)										
100 m breaststroke							H	1st place, gold medalist(s)				
50 m butterfly							H	1st place, gold medalist(s)				
100 m butterfly					H	1st place, gold medalist(s)						
200 m individual medley											H	1st place, gold medalist(s)

== Overall results ==
Key: Highlighted swimmers achieved the "A" qualifying time for the 2022 World Aquatics Championships and the 2022 Commonwealth Games in the event. Highlighted swimmers achieved a "B" qualifying time and were named to the 2022 World Aquatics Championships roster for South Africa in the event.

=== Men ===
Event	Gold		Silver		Bronze	
50 m freestyle	Pieter Coetze (RSA); Aquatics Guateng Tshwane	22.34	Brad Tandy (RSA); KwaZulu-Natal	22.49	Clayton Jimmie (RSA); KwaZulu-Natal	22.82
100 m freestyle	Matthew Sates (RSA); KwaZulu-Natal	48.97	Pieter Coetze (RSA); Aquatics Guateng Tshwane	50.17	Alexander Skinner (NAM); Namibia	50.43
200 m freestyle	Matthew Sates (RSA); KwaZulu-Natal	1:46.15	Max Litchfield (GBR); Great Britain	1:49.49	Andrew Ross (RSA); Aquatics Guateng Tshwane	1:49.59
400 m freestyle	Matthew Sates (RSA); KwaZulu-Natal	3:49.37	Max Litchfield (GBR); Great Britain	3:51.37	Andrew Ross (RSA); Aquatics Guateng Tshwane	3:56.92
800 m freestyle	Aneesh Gowda (IND); India	8:14.45	Roberto Gomes (RSA); Aquatics Guateng Tshwane	8:19.10	Ruan Breytenbach (RSA); Aquatics Guateng Tshwane	8:20.30
1500 m freestyle	Righardt Muller (RSA); Western Cape Aquatics	15.36.70	Aneesh Gowda (IND); India	15:48.89	Ruan Breytenbach (RSA); Aquatics Guateng Tshwane	16:03.42
50 m backstroke	Pieter Coetze (RSA); Aquatics Guateng Tshwane	24.74	Jonah Pool-Jones (RSA); Western Cape Aquatics	26.32	Ruard van Renen (RSA); Western Cape Aquatics	26.56
100 m backstroke	Pieter Coetze (RSA); Aquatics Guateng Tshwane	54.08^{[a]}	Ruard van Renen (RSA); Western Cape Aquatics	57.04	Liam Vehbi (RSA); Eastern Cape Aquatics	58.03
200 m backstroke	Ruan Ras (RSA); Aquatics Guateng Tshwane	2:05.03	Guy Brooks (RSA); KwaZulu-Natal	2:05.33	Utkarsh Santosh Patil (IND); India	2:07.21
50 m breaststroke	Michael Houlie (RSA); Western Cape Aquatics	27.22^{[b]}	Brenden Crawford (RSA); Aquatics Guateng Ekurhuleni	28.12	Joshua Emslie (RSA); Western Cape Aquatics	28.98
100 m breaststroke	Brenden Crawford (RSA); Aquatics Guateng Ekurhuleni	1:01.00	Michael Houlie (RSA); Western Cape Aquatics	1:01.56	Matthew Randle (RSA); Aquatics Guateng Tshwane	1:02.96
200 m breaststroke	Kian Keylock (RSA); Aquatics Guateng Ekurhuleni	2:14.47	Matthew Randle (RSA); Aquatics Guateng Tshwane	2:14.49	Ruan Breytenbach (RSA); Aquatics Guateng Tshwane	2:16.50
50 m butterfly	Chad le Clos (RSA); Western Cape Aquatics	23.93	Pieter Coetze (RSA); Aquatics Guateng Tshwane	24.14	Matthew Sates (RSA); KwaZulu-Natal	24.28
100 m butterfly	Chad le Clos (RSA); Western Cape Aquatics	51.88	Matthew Sates (RSA); KwaZulu-Natal	52.06	Pieter Coetze (RSA); Aquatics Guateng Tshwane	53.52
200 m butterfly	Chad le Clos (RSA); Western Cape Aquatics	1:55.75	Max Litchfield (GBR); Great Britain	1:57.66	Ethan du Preez (RSA); Western Cape Aquatics	1:59.57
200 m individual medley	Matthew Sates (RSA); KwaZulu-Natal	1:58.37	Max Litchfield (GBR); Great Britain	1:59.96	Kian Keylock (RSA); Aquatics Guateng Ekurhuleni	2:04.52
400 m individual medley	Max Litchfield (GBR); Great Britain	4:15.39	Ruan Breytenbach (RSA); Aquatics Guateng Tshwane	4:27.14	Ruan Ras (RSA); Aquatics Guateng Tshwane	4:27.34
4×50 m freestyle relay	Aquatics Guateng Tshwane; Pieter Coetze (22.15)^{[c]}	1:30.75	KwaZulu-Natal	1:31.05	Western Cape Aquatics	1:31.42
4×100 m freestyle relay	KwaZulu-Natal	3:22.68	Aquatics Guateng Tshwane	3:23.05	Western Cape Aquatics	3:24.55
4×200 m freestyle relay	Aquatics Guateng Tshwane (a-relay)	7:36.53	Aquatics Guateng Tshwane (b-relay)	7:36.75	KwaZulu-Natal	7:41.27
4×100 m medley relay	Western Cape Aquatics	3:47.97	Aquatics Guateng Tshwane (a-relay)	3:50.49	Aquatics Guateng Tshwane (b-relay)	3:53.75

^{a} Coetze swam a FINA "A" cut time of 53.96 seconds in the heats.
^{b} Houlie swam a FINA "A" cut time, though was not automatically qualified for the 2022 World Aquatics Championships team as he did not qualify in an Olympic event.
^{c} Coetze swam a FINA "A" cut time of 22.15 seconds in the 50 metre freestyle for the lead-off leg of the relay.

=== Women ===
Event	Gold		Silver		Bronze	
50 m freestyle	Emma Chelius (RSA); KwaZulu-Natal	25.08	Erin Gallagher (RSA); Aquatics Guateng Tshwane	25.39	Aimee Canny (RSA); Western Cape Aquatics Olivia Nel (RSA); Western Cape Aquatics	25.62
100 m freestyle	Aimee Canny (RSA); Western Cape Aquatics	54.71	Erin Gallagher (RSA); Aquatics Guateng Tshwane	54.73	Emma Chelius (RSA); KwaZulu-Natal	55.70
200 m freestyle	Aimee Canny (RSA); Western Cape Aquatics	1:58.34	Duné Coetzee (RSA); Aquatics Guateng Tshwane	2:00.60	Erin Gallagher (RSA); Aquatics Guateng Tshwane	2:00.72
400 m freestyle	Duné Coetzee (RSA); Aquatics Guateng Tshwane	4:12.35	Michaela Pulford (RSA); Aquatics Guateng Ekurhuleni	4:15.93	Rebecca Meder (RSA); KwaZulu-Natal	4:20.47
800 m freestyle	Michaela Pulford (RSA); Aquatics Guateng Ekurhuleni	8:46.33	Catherine van Rensburg (RSA); Aquatics Guateng Tshwane	8:53.55	Leigh McMorran (RSA); Aquatics Guateng Johannesburg	8:58.50
1500 m freestyle	Stephanie Houtman (RSA); Aquatics Guateng Tshwane	16:55.55	Catherine van Rensburg (RSA); Aquatics Guateng Tshwane	17:04.28	Leigh McMorran (RSA); Aquatics Guateng Johannesburg	17:08.30
50 m backstroke	Olivia Nel (RSA); Western Cape Aquatics	28.81	Rebecca Meder (RSA); KwaZulu-Natal	28.86	Kerryn Herbst (RSA); Aquatics Guateng Tshwane	29.43
100 m backstroke	Rebecca Meder (RSA); KwaZulu-Natal	1:02.55	Kerryn Herbst (RSA); Aquatics Guateng Tshwane	1:02.98	Olivia Nel (RSA); Western Cape Aquatics	1:03.00
200 m backstroke	Hannah Pearse (RSA); Aquatics Guateng Tshwane	2:15.78	Samantha Randle (RSA); Aquatics Guateng Tshwane		Bernelee Doster (RSA); Aquatics Guateng Johannesburg	
50 m breaststroke	Lara van Niekerk (RSA); Aquatics Guateng Tshwane	30.60	Tatjana Schoenmaker (RSA); Aquatics Guateng Tshwane	30.87	Kaylene Corbett (RSA); Aquatics Guateng Tshwane	31.94
100 m breaststroke	Lara van Niekerk (RSA); Aquatics Guateng Tshwane	1:05.67	Tatjana Schoenmaker (RSA); Aquatics Guateng Tshwane	1:06.06	Kaylene Corbett (RSA); Aquatics Guateng Tshwane	1:08.63
200 m breaststroke	Tatjana Schoenmaker (RSA); Aquatics Guateng Tshwane	2:24.01	Kaylene Corbett (RSA); Aquatics Guateng Tshwane	2:24.66	Emily Visagie (RSA); KwaZulu-Natal	2:32.57
50 m butterfly	Erin Gallagher (RSA); Aquatics Guateng Tshwane	26.39	Inge Weidemann (RSA); Aquatics Guateng Tshwane	27.24	Rebecca Meder (RSA); KwaZulu-Natal	27.35
100 m butterfly	Erin Gallagher (RSA); Aquatics Guateng Tshwane	59.78	Duné Coetzee (RSA); Aquatics Guateng Tshwane	1:00.82	Rebecca Meder (RSA); KwaZulu-Natal	1:01.50
200 m butterfly	Duné Coetzee (RSA); Aquatics Guateng Tshwane	2:11.88	Trinity Hearne (RSA); Western Cape Aquatics	2:15.46	Leigh McMorran (RSA); Aquatics Guateng Johannesburg	2:17.88
200 m individual medley	Rebecca Meder (RSA); KwaZulu-Natal	2:15.01	Dakota Tucker (RSA); Aquatics Guateng Johannesburg	2:18.26	Aimee Canny (RSA); Western Cape Aquatics	2:18.98
400 m individual medley	Rebecca Meder (RSA); KwaZulu-Natal	4:49.04	Samantha Randle (RSA); Aquatics Guateng Tshwane	4:55.81	Marlies Ross (RSA); Aquatics Guateng Tshwane	4:56.26
4×50 m freestyle relay	Aquatics Guateng Tshwane	1:43.45	Western Cape Aquatics	1:44.06	KwaZulu-Natal	1:44.08
4×100 m freestyle relay	Western Cape Aquatics	3:46.42	KwaZulu-Natal	3:50.11	Aquatics Guateng Tshwane	3:54.05
4×200 m freestyle relay	Aquatics Guateng Tshwane (a-relay)	8:23.15	Aquatics Guateng Tshwane (b-relay)	8:33.80	Western Cape Aquatics	8:37.74
4×100 m medley relay	Aquatics Guateng Tshwane (a-relay)		Western Cape Aquatics		Aquatics Guateng Tshwane (b-relay)	

=== Mixed ===
Event	Gold		Silver		Bronze	
4×100 m freestyle relay	Western Cape Aquatics	3:33.52	Aquatics Guateng Tshwane	3:35.57	KwaZulu-Natal	3:41.69
4×100 m medley relay	Aquatics Guateng Tshwane (a-relay)	3:54.34	Western Cape Aquatics	3:57.22	Aquatics Guateng Tshwane (b-relay)	4:02.73

=== Medal table ===
* Host nation (Eastern Cape Aquatics)

Rank	Nation	Gold	Silver	Bronze	Total
1	Aquatics Guateng Tshwane (RSA)	19	23	17	59
2	Western Cape Aquatics (RSA)	11	7	10	28
3	KwaZulu-Natal (RSA)	9	6	10	25
4	Aquatics Guateng Ekurhuleni (RSA)	3	2	1	6
5	Great Britain (GBR)	1	4	0	5
6	India (IND)	1	1	1	3
7	Aquatics Guateng Johannesburg (RSA)	0	1	4	5
8	Eastern Cape Aquatics (RSA)*	0	0	1	1
8	Namibia (NAM)	0	0	1	1
Totals (9 entries)		44	44	45	133

=== Qualification via time trial ===
The following qualifying time was achieved during a time trial conducted as part of the Championships.

Event	Name	Time	Date	Day	Qualification meet	Ref
200 m backstroke	Pieter Coetze (RSA)	1:56.92	11 April 2022	6	2022 World Aquatics Championships, 2022 Commonwealth Games	

== Records set ==
=== Men ===
Event	Stage	Name	Time	Date	Day	Record	Ref
200 m freestyle	Heats	Alexander Skinner (NAM)	1:52.11	7 April 2022	2	Namibian record	
100 m freestyle	Final	Alexander Skinner (NAM)	50.43	8 April 2022	3	Namibian record	

=== Women ===
Event	Stage	Name	Time	Date	Day	Record	Ref
50 m breaststroke	Heats	Lara van Niekerk (RSA)	29.72	6 April 2022	1	Commonwealth record, African record, South African record	

== Broadcast ==
A live broadcast of day one was aired on YouTube by Swimming South Africa. Days two, three, four, five, and six were streamed live as well. Aired broadcasts were continuous stream format, meaning they covered heats through finals, and were segmented into two videos if exceeding 12 hours in length.

== Participating nations ==
Athletes from countries including the following participated at the Championships.

- Botswana (BOTS)
- Great Britain (GBR)
- India (IND)
- Mozambique (CDTM)
- Namibia (NAM)
- South Africa (RSA, by region)
- Seychelles (SEY)
- Zambia (ZAM)
- Zimbabwe (ZIM)

=== South Africa regional representation ===
Athletes from South Africa competed on teams by province/region, including the following.

- Ekurhuleni, Gauteng (Aquatics Guateng Ekurhuleni - AGA)
- Johannesburg, Gauteng (Aquatics Guateng Johannesburg - AGB)
- Tshwane, Gauteng (Aquatics Guateng Tshwane - AGC)
- Eastern Cape (Eastern Cape Aquatics - ECA)
- FAAC
- Free State (FSA)
- HAM
- KwaZulu-Natal (KZNA)
- Limpopo (LP)
- Mpumalanga (MPA)
- North West (North West Swimming - NWS)
- Western Cape (Western Cape Aquatics - WCA)

== Incidents ==
On the morning of the last day of competition, Monday 11 April 2022, 45-year-old security guard Monde Qheru was found dead in the Newton Park Swimming Pool.

== See also ==
- South Africa at the 2022 Commonwealth Games
- South Africa at the 2022 World Aquatics Championships
- Telkom SA National Aquatic Championships
- List of swimming competitions
