= 2018 African Swimming Championships – Women's 200 metre breaststroke =

Women's 200 metre breaststroke at the 2018 African Swimming Championships
- Venue: Mohamed Boudiaf Olympic Complex
- Dates: 11 September (heats and final)
- Competitors: 12 from 9 nations
- Winning time: 2:35.25

Medalists
gold medal	Lara van Niekerk	South Africa
silver medal	Rowida Hesham	Egypt
bronze medal	Hamida Rania Nefsi	Algeria

The Women's 200 metre breaststroke competition of the 2018 African Swimming Championships was held on 11 September 2018.

== Records ==
Prior to the competition, the existing world and championship records were as follows.

	Name	Nation	Time	Location	Date
World record	Rikke Møller Pedersen	Denmark	2:19.11	Barcelona	1 August 2013
African record	Tatjana Schoenmaker	South Africa	2:22.02	Gold Coast	7 April 2018
Championship record	Sarra Lajnef	Tunisia	2:32.16	Casablanca	14 September 2010

== Results ==
=== Heats ===
The heats were started on 11 September at 11:20.

Rank	Name	Nationality	Time	Notes
1	Lara van Niekerk	South Africa	2:39.15	Q
2	Rebecca Kamau	Kenya	2:41.18	Q
3	Hamida Rania Nefsi	Algeria	2:42.08	Q
4	Rowida Hesham	Egypt	2:42.33	Q
5	Habiba Belghith	Tunisia	2:43.13	Q
6	Tessa Ip Hen Cheung	Mauritius	2:46.73	Q
7	Hiba Laknit	Morocco	2:47.00	Q
8	Fatima Jayla	Cape Verde	2:55.55	Q
9	Lesa La Troya	Cape Verde	2:56.74	
	Khensa Belkacemi	Algeria	Disqualified	
	Jade Simons	South Africa	Disqualified	
	Evelyn Nmor	Nigeria	Did not start	

=== Final ===
The final was started on 11 September.

Rank	Lane	Name	Nationality	Time	Notes
1st place, gold medalist(s)	4	Lara van Niekerk	South Africa	2:35.25	
2nd place, silver medalist(s)	6	Rowida Hesham	Egypt	2:38.99	
3rd place, bronze medalist(s)	3	Hamida Rania Nefsi	Algeria	2:40.10	
4	2	Habiba Belghith	Tunisia	2:40.11	
5	5	Rebecca Kamau	Kenya	2:41.42	
6	7	Tessa Ip Hen Cheung	Mauritius	2:44.56	
7	1	Hiba Laknit	Morocco	2:45.51	
8	8	Fatima Jayla	Cape Verde	2:55.77	
