= Swimming at the 2019 African Games – Women's 100 metre breaststroke =

Women's 100 metre breaststroke at the 2019 African Games
- Venue: Mohammed V Sports Complex – Olympic Pool
- Dates: 22 August (heats and final)
- Competitors: 9 from 7 nations
- Winning time: 1:09.75

Medalists
gold medal	Kaylene Corbett	South Africa
silver medal	Christin Mundell	South Africa
bronze medal	Sarah Soliman	Egypt

The Women's 100 metre breaststroke competition of the 2019 African Games was held on 22 August 2019.

== Records ==
Prior to the competition, the existing world and championship records were as follows.

	Name	Nation	Time	Location	Date
World record	Lilly King	United States	1:04.13	Budapest	25 July 2017
African record	Tatjana Schoenmaker	South Africa	1:06.32	Naples	5 July 2019
Games record	Penny Heyns	South Africa	1:07.58	Johannesburg	15 September 1999

== Results ==
=== Heats ===
The heats were started on 22 August at 10:30.

Rank	Heat	Lane	Name	Nationality	Time	Notes
1	1	4	Christin Mundell	South Africa	1:11.23	Q
2	2	4	Kaylene Corbett	South Africa	1:12.11	Q
3	2	5	Sarah Soliman	Egypt	1:14.10	Q
4	2	3	Rebecca Kamau	Kenya	1:14.25	Q
5	1	5	Tilka Paljk	Zambia	1:15.71	Q
6	2	6	Maria Brunlehner	Kenya	1:15.85	Q, WD
7	1	6	Hiba Laknit	Morocco	1:16.36	Q
8	1	3	Tessa Ip Hen Cheung	Mauritius	1:16.71	Q
9	2	2	Berhane Amare	Ethiopia	1:35.13	Q

=== Final ===
The final was started on 22 August at 17:00.

Rank	Lane	Name	Nationality	Time	Notes
1st place, gold medalist(s)	5	Kaylene Corbett	South Africa	1:09.75	
2nd place, silver medalist(s)	4	Christin Mundell	South Africa	1:10.67	
3rd place, bronze medalist(s)	3	Sarah Soliman	Egypt	1:13.36	
4	2	Tilka Paljk	Zambia	1:13.78	
5	6	Rebecca Kamau	Kenya	1:13.99	
6	7	Hiba Laknit	Morocco	1:15.88	
7	1	Tessa Ip Hen Cheung	Mauritius	1:16.05	
8	8	Berhane Amare	Ethiopia	1:34.46	
