= Kings Park Stadium =

Sports venue in Durban, South Africa

Coordinates: 29°49′30″S 31°1′47″E

Hollywoodbets Kings Park Stadium
- Kings Park Stadium
- Shark Tank
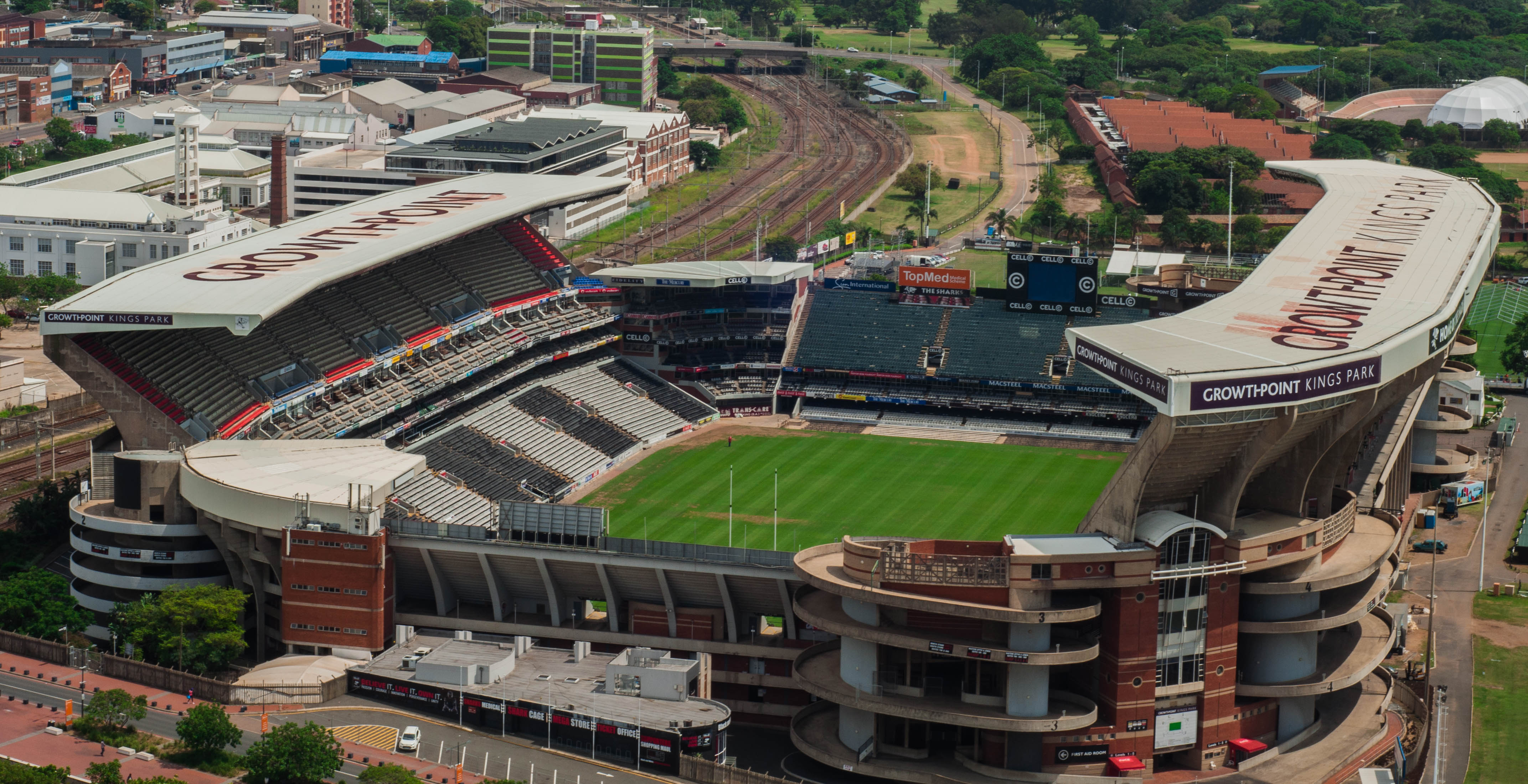
- View of the stadium in 2015
- Interactive map of Hollywoodbets Kings Park Stadium
- Former names: ABSA Stadium (2000–2010); Mr Price Kings Park (2011–2012); Growthpoint Kings Park (2013–2018); Jonsson Kings Park (2018–2022)
- Address: Jacko Jackson Drive, Kings Park Sporting Precinct, Stamford Hill
- Location: Durban, KwaZulu-Natal, South Africa
- Owner: Natal Sharks (Pty.) Ltd. (formerly); eThekwini Metropolitan Municipality
- Capacity: 46,000 (regular capacity); 60,000 (max capacity)
- Executive suites: 350
- Type: Stadium
- Surface: Grass
- Record attendance: 57,000 (South Africa–New Zealand; 2002 Tri Nations Series)
- Field shape: Rectangular (Football, Rugby union)
- Current use: Rugby union
- Public transit: Metrorail KwaZulu-Natal

Construction
- Built: 1891 (former ground); 1958 (modern ground)
- Opened: 1958; 68 years ago
- Renovated: 1976; 1984; 1993–1995

Tenants
- Sharks (URC) (Note: The Sharks formerly participated in the Super Rugby competition between 1996 and 2020.) (1996–present); Sharks (Currie Cup) (Currie Cup) (1956–present); South Africa national rugby union team (various matches)

Kings Park Stadium (known as Hollywoodbets Kings Park for sponsorship reasons since 2022), colloquially known as the Shark Tank, is a stadium located in the Kings Park Sporting Precinct in Durban, South Africa. It is the home of the Sharks rugby union team.

The stadium was originally built with a capacity of 12,000 and opened in 1958, extensively renovated in the 1980s and then again in time for the 1995 Rugby World Cup. It currently has a capacity of 46,000, after renovations reduced the capacity from 54,000 and is the home ground of the Sharks. The stadium is also used by Durban-based Premier Soccer League football (soccer) clubs, as well as for large football finals.

It was previously also known as the ABSA Stadium (between 2000 and 2010), Mr Price Kings Park Stadium (in 2011 and 2012), Growthpoint Kings Park (between 2013 and early 2017), and Jonsson Kings Park (between 2018 and 2021) due to sponsorship deals.

== 1995 Rugby World Cup ==
The stadium was used as one of the venues for the 1995 Rugby World Cup held in South Africa. The stadium hosted three pool games in Pool B. The stadium also hosted one quarter final with France defeating Ireland 36–12. A very wet semi final was played here on 17 June 1995 between South Africa and France.

Date	Team	Result	Team	Round	Attendance
27 May 1995	Argentina	18–24	England	Pool B	35,000
31 May 1995	England	27–20	Italy	Pool B	45,093
4 June 1995	England	44–22	Western Samoa	Pool B	35,000
10 June 1995	France	36–12	Ireland	Quarter-final	20,000
17 June 1995	South Africa	19–15	France	Semi-final	49,773

== 1996 African Cup of Nations ==
The stadium was one of four venues for the 1996 African Cup of Nations. It hosted 3 group matches, a quarter final and semi final.

Date	Team	Result	Team	Round	Attendance
16 January 1996	Gabon	1–2	Liberia	Group C	5,000
19 January 1996	Gabon	2–0	Zaire	Group C	4,000
24 January 1996	Angola	3–3	Cameroon	Group A	6,000
28 January 1996	Gabon	1–1 (a.e.t.) (1–4 (p))	Tunisia	Quarter-final	4,000
31 January 1996	Zambia	2–4	Tunisia	Semi-final	5,000

== Other events ==
Artist	Tour	Date
Whitney Houston	The Bodyguard World Tour	8 November 1994
Roxette	Crash! Boom! Bang! Tour	6 January 1995
Bon Jovi	These Days Tour	3 December 1995
Tina Turner	Wildest Dreams Tour	18 April 1996
Gloria Estefan	Evolution World Tour	20 March 1997
Michael Jackson	HIStory World Tour (the last show of the tour)	15 October 1997
Janet Jackson	The Velvet Rope Tour	19 November 1998
Live	The Distance to Here Tour	20 June 2000
R.E.M.	Around the Sun Tour	8 March 2005
Metallica	Escape from the Studio '06	21 March 2006
Robbie Williams	Close Encounters Tour	10 April 2006
Celine Dion	Taking Chances World Tour	20 February 2008
Rod Stewart	South Africa Tour	4 December 2008

== Springbok matches ==
Date	Opponent	Result	Winner	Competition	Attendance
21 July 1962	British & Irish Lions	3–0	South Africa	1962 British Lions tour of South Africa	40,000
23 May 1964	Wales	24–3	South Africa	1964 Wales tour of Kenya and South Africa	35,000
15 July 1967	France	26–3	South Africa	1967 France tour of South Africa	39,000
16 August 1969	Australia	16–9	South Africa	1969 Australia tour of South Africa	40,000
19 June 1971	France	8–8	draw	1971 France tour of South Africa	40,000
24 July 1976	New Zealand	16–7	South Africa	1976 New Zealand tour of South Africa	46,000
3 May 1980	South American XV	18–9	South Africa	1980 South American XV tour of South Africa	37,000
6 June 1981	Ireland	12–10	South Africa	1981 Ireland tour of South Africa	38,600
17 May 1986	New Zealand Cavaliers	18–19	New Zealand Cavaliers	1986 New Zealand Cavaliers tour of South Africa	42,000
26 June 1993	France	20–20	draw	1993 France tour of South Africa	45,000
17 June 1995	South Africa	19–15	France	1995 Rugby World Cup	49,773
17 August 1996	South Africa	19–23	New Zealand	1996 New Zealand tour of South Africa	52,000
28 June 1997	South Africa	15–18	British & Irish Lions	1997 British Lions tour of South Africa	50,000
15 August 1998	South Africa	24–23	New Zealand	1998 Tri Nations Series	45,000
19 June 1999	South Africa	101–0	Italy	1999 Italy tour of South Africa	36,210
26 August 2000	South Africa	18–19	Australia	2000 Tri Nations Series	52,000
23 June 2001	South Africa	20–15	France	2001 France tour of South Africa and New Zealand	44,794
10 August 2002	South Africa	23–30	New Zealand	2002 Tri Nations Series	57,000
7 June 2003	South Africa	29–25	Scotland	2003 Scotland tour of South Africa	37,528
21 August 2004	South Africa	23–19	Australia	2004 Tri Nations Series	52,247
18 June 2005	France	30–30	draw	2005 France tour of South Africa and Australia	50,419
10 June 2006	South Africa	36–16	Scotland	2006 Scotland tour of South Africa	32,066
23 June 2007	South Africa	21–26	New Zealand	2007 Tri Nations Series	51,861
23 August 2008	South Africa	15–27	Australia	2008 Tri Nations Series	48,123
20 June 2009	South Africa	26–21	British & Irish Lions	2009 British & Irish Lions tour of South Africa	49,055
1 August 2009	South Africa	31–19	New Zealand	2009 Tri Nations Series	43,149
13 August 2011	South Africa	9–14	Australia	2011 Tri Nations Series	47,850
9 June 2012	South Africa	22–17	England	2012 England tour of South Africa	43,052
8 June 2013	South Africa	44–10	Italy	Quadrangular Tournament	23,663
14 June 2014	South Africa	38–16	Wales	2014 Wales tour of South Africa	37,182
8 August 2015	South Africa	25–37	Argentina	2015 Rugby Championship	27,447
8 October 2016	South Africa	15–57	New Zealand	2016 Rugby Championship	51,500
17 June 2017	South Africa	37–15	France	2017 France tour of South Africa	27,712
18 August 2018	South Africa	34–21	Argentina	2018 Rugby Championship	26,836
24 September 2022	South Africa	38–21	Argentina	2022 Rugby Championship	45,982
13 July 2024	South Africa	24-25	Ireland	2024 Ireland tour of South Africa	52,000
27 September 2025	South Africa	67-30	Argentina	2025 Rugby Championship	45,158

=== Statistics ===
Statistics updated to most recent match against Argentina, 13 July 2024.

Opponent	P	W	D	L	W%	F	A	Diff.
Argentina	4	3	0	1	75.00	164	109	+55
Australia	5	2	0	3	40.00	81	88	–7
British & Irish Lions	3	2	0	1	66.67	44	39	+5
England	1	1	0	0	100.00	22	17	+5
France	7	4	3	0	57.14	160	106	+54
Ireland	2	1	0	1	50.00	36	35	+1
Italy	2	2	0	0	100.00	145	10	+135
New Zealand	7	3	0	4	42.86	149	185	–36
New Zealand Cavaliers	1	0	0	1	0.00	18	19	–1
Scotland	2	2	0	0	100.00	65	41	+24
South American XV	1	1	0	0	100.00	18	9	+9
Wales	2	2	0	0	100.00	62	19	+43
Opponent	36	22	3	11	61.11	897	647	+250

== Future ==
With the construction of the new Moses Mabhida Stadium for the 2010 FIFA World Cup less than 200m away, the local government had hoped that the Sharks would relocate. However, this is unlikely as they have a 50-year lease on Kings Park which runs to 2056.
