= Swimming South Africa =

Sports governing body in South Africa

Swimming South Africa SSA
- IOC nation: RSA
- Sport: Swimming
- Other sports: Water Polo; Diving; Synchro
- Official website: www.swimsa.org

HISTORY
- Year of formation: 1899
- Former names: South African Amateur Swimming Union

AFFILIATIONS
- International federation: Fédération Internationale de Natation (FINA)
- FINA member since: 1909
- Continental association: African Swimming Confederation
- National Olympic Committee: South African Sports Confederation and Olympic Committee

Swimming South Africa (SSA) is the national governing body for the sport of swimming in South Africa, recognised by the FINA

The body also administers water polo. SSA controversially withdrew both the men's and women's water polo teams from the 2024 Olympics for not being realistic medal contenders.

== Competitions ==
- Telkom SA National Aquatic Championships
- 2022 SA National Swimming Championships

== YouTube channel ==
Swimming South Africa maintains a YouTube channel, branded as SwimSA TV, where it provides live broadcasts of a variety of its swimming competitions, such as the Swimming Grand Prix and National Aquatic Championships.

== See also ==
- Lifesaving South Africa
