= Swimming at the 2022 Commonwealth Games – Women's 200 metre breaststroke =

Women's 200 metre breaststroke at the 2022 Commonwealth Games
- Venue: Sandwell Aquatics Centre
- Dates: 31 July
- Competitors: 14 from 10 nations
- Winning time: 2:21.92

Medalists
gold medal	Tatjana Schoenmaker	South Africa
silver medal	Jenna Strauch	Australia
bronze medal	Kaylene Corbett	South Africa

The women's 200 metre breaststroke event at the 2022 Commonwealth Games was held on 31 July at the Sandwell Aquatics Centre.

== Records ==
Prior to this competition, the existing world, Commonwealth and Games records were as follows:

World record	Tatjana Schoenmaker (RSA)	2:18.95	Tokyo, Japan	30 July 2021
Commonwealth record	Tatjana Schoenmaker (RSA)	2:18.95	Tokyo, Japan	30 July 2021
Games record	Leisel Jones (AUS)	2:20.72	Melbourne, Australia	18 March 2006

== Schedule ==
The schedule is as follows:

All times are British Summer Time (UTC+1)

Date	Time	Round
Sunday 31 July 2022	10:41	Heats
Sunday 31 July 2022	20:22	Final

== Results ==
=== Heats ===
Rank	Heat	Lane	Name	Nationality	Time	Notes
1	2	4	Tatjana Schoenmaker	South Africa	2:21.76	Q
2	2	3	Jenna Strauch	Australia	2:24.97	Q
3	1	4	Molly Renshaw	England	2:25.06	Q
4	1	5	Kaylene Corbett	South Africa	2:25.08	Q
5	1	3	Abbey Harkin	Australia	2:26.11	Q
6	2	5	Abbie Wood	England	2:26.80	WD
7	2	6	Taylor McKeown	Australia	2:28.15	Q
8	1	6	Tessa Cieplucha	Canada	2:30.04	Q
9	2	2	Letitia Sim	Singapore	2:30.52	R, Q
10	1	2	Mya Rasmussen	New Zealand	2:33.62	R
11	1	7	Asia Kent	Gibraltar	2:43.98	
12	2	7	Adara Stoddard	Barbados	2:46.15	
13	1	1	Zaylie-Elizabeth Thompson	Bahamas	2:51.09	
14	2	1	Kelera Mudunasoko	Fiji	2:53.40	

=== Final ===
Rank	Lane	Name	Nationality	Time	Notes
1st place, gold medalist(s)	4	Tatjana Schoenmaker	South Africa	2:21.92	
2nd place, silver medalist(s)	5	Jenna Strauch	Australia	2:23.65	
3rd place, bronze medalist(s)	6	Kaylene Corbett	South Africa	2:23.67	
4	3	Molly Renshaw	England	2:24.00	
5	2	Abbey Harkin	Australia	2:24.07	
6	7	Taylor McKeown	Australia	2:25.50	
7	1	Tessa Cieplucha	Canada	2:28.43	
8	8	Letitia Sim	Singapore	2:29.06	
