= Tilka Paljk =

Slovenian-Zambian swimmer

Personal information
- Nationality: Zambian
- Born: 18 February 1997 (age 29) Postojna, Slovenia

Sport
- Sport: Swimming
Medal record
Representing Zambia
African Games
Bronze medal – third place	2019 Casablanca	50 m breaststroke
African Championships
Silver medal – second place	2018 Algiers	50 m breaststroke

Tilka Paljk (born 18 February 1997) is a Slovenian swimmer. She competed in the women's 100 metre breaststroke event at the 2017 World Aquatics Championships. She also competed in three events at the 2018 Commonwealth Games. Paljk was born in Postojna, Slovenia. Paljk was named the Zambia Sportswoman of the Year in 2018 and 2019, and was named in Forbes Africa 30 under 30 in 2021.

== Major results ==
=== Individual ===
==== Long course ====
Year	Competition	Venue	Position	Event	Notes
Representing Zambia
2013	World Championships	Barcelona, Spain	62nd (h)	50 m freestyle	29.05
2013	World Championships	Barcelona, Spain	56th (h)	50 m breaststroke	34.28
2014	Commonwealth Games	(United Kingdom) Glasgow, Great Britain	38th (h)	50 m freestyle	28.20
2014	Commonwealth Games	(United Kingdom) Glasgow, Great Britain	23rd (h)	50 m breaststroke	35.19
2014	Commonwealth Games	(United Kingdom) Glasgow, Great Britain	33rd (h)	100 m breaststroke	1:20.44
2015	World Championships	Kazan, Russia	55th (h)	100 m breaststroke	1:17.13
2015	World Championships	Kazan, Russia	46th (h)	200 m breaststroke	2:55.98
2017	World Championships	Budapest, Hungary	32nd (h)	50 m breaststroke	32.72
2017	World Championships	Budapest, Hungary	36th (h)	100 m breaststroke	1:12.65
2018	Commonwealth Games	Gold Coast, Australia	22nd (h)	50 m freestyle	27.47
2018	Commonwealth Games	Gold Coast, Australia	13th (sf)	50 m breaststroke	32.05
2018	Commonwealth Games	Gold Coast, Australia	21st (h)	100 m breaststroke	1:12.01
2018	African Championships	Algiers, Algeria	2nd	50 m breaststroke	32.15
2018	African Championships	Algiers, Algeria	4th	100 m breaststroke	1:13.41
2019	World Championships	Gwangju, South Korea	34th (h)	50 m breaststroke	32.37
2019	World Championships	Gwangju, South Korea	42nd (h)	100 m breaststroke	1:15.02
2019	African Games	Casablanca, Morocco	7th	50 m freestyle	27.39
2019	African Games	Casablanca, Morocco	3rd	50 m breaststroke	32.92
2019	African Games	Casablanca, Morocco	4th	100 m breaststroke	1:13.78
2021	Olympic Games	Tokyo, Japan	52nd (h)	50 m freestyle	27.34
2022	World Championships	Budapest, Hungary	40th (h)	50 m breaststroke	33.64
2022	World Championships	Budapest, Hungary	56th (h)	50 m butterfly	31.48
2022	Commonwealth Games	(United Kingdom) Birmingham, Great Britain	39th (h)	50 m freestyle	27.94
2022	Commonwealth Games	(United Kingdom) Birmingham, Great Britain	22nd (h)	50 m breaststroke	34.20
2022	Commonwealth Games	(United Kingdom) Birmingham, Great Britain	19th (h)	100 m breaststroke	1:15.26

==== Short course ====
Year	Competition	Venue	Position	Event	Notes
Representing Zambia
2016	World Championships	Windsor, Canada	64th (h)	50 m freestyle	26.89
2016	World Championships	Windsor, Canada	80th (h)	100 m freestyle	58.67
2016	World Championships	Windsor, Canada	35th (h)	50 m breaststroke	32.29
2016	World Championships	Windsor, Canada	40th (h)	100 m breaststroke	1:11.48
2018	World Championships	Hangzhou, China	33rd (h)	50 m breaststroke	31.84
2018	World Championships	Hangzhou, China	36th (h)	100 m breaststroke	1:11.22

=== Relay ===
==== Long course ====
Year	Competition	Venue	Team	Position	Event	Notes
Representing Zambia
2015	World Championships	Kazan, Russia	Howard / Axiotis / Goveia / Paljk	20th (h)	4 × 100 m mixed medley	4:14.40
2019	African Games	Casablanca, Morocco	Naidu / Goveia / Paljk / Mwape	10th (h)	4 × 100 m mixed medley	4:27.78
2022	Commonwealth Games	(United Kingdom) Birmingham, Great Britain	Naidu / Moyo / Phiri / Paljk	16th (h)	4 × 100 m mixed medley	4:30.43

==== Short course ====
Year	Competition	Venue	Team	Position	Event	Notes
Representing Zambia
2016	World Championships	Windsor, Canada	Howard / Axiotis / Goveia / Paljk	23rd (h)	4 × 50 m mixed medley	1:50.01

== Personal bests ==
Event	Result	SP	Competition	Venue	Date
Long course
50 m Breaststroke	32.05 NR	771	Commonwealth Games	(Australia) Gold Coast	5 April 2018
100 m Breaststroke	1:12.01 NR	706	Commonwealth Games	(Australia) Gold Coast	8 April 2018
Short course
50 m Breaststroke	31.74 NR	772	CANA Zone IV Championships	(Malawi) Lilongwe	21 March 2018
100 m Breaststroke	1:10.17 NR	701	CANA Zone IV Championships	(Malawi) Lilongwe	23 March 2018

- This list include only above 700 Swimming points time.

Olympic Games
Preceded by Mathews Punza	Flag bearer for Zambia; Tokyo 2020 with Everisto Mulenga	Succeeded by Muzala Samukonga; Margaret Tembo
