= Kings Park Sporting Precinct =

Site in Durban, South Africa

Coordinates: 29°49′29″S 31°1′47″E

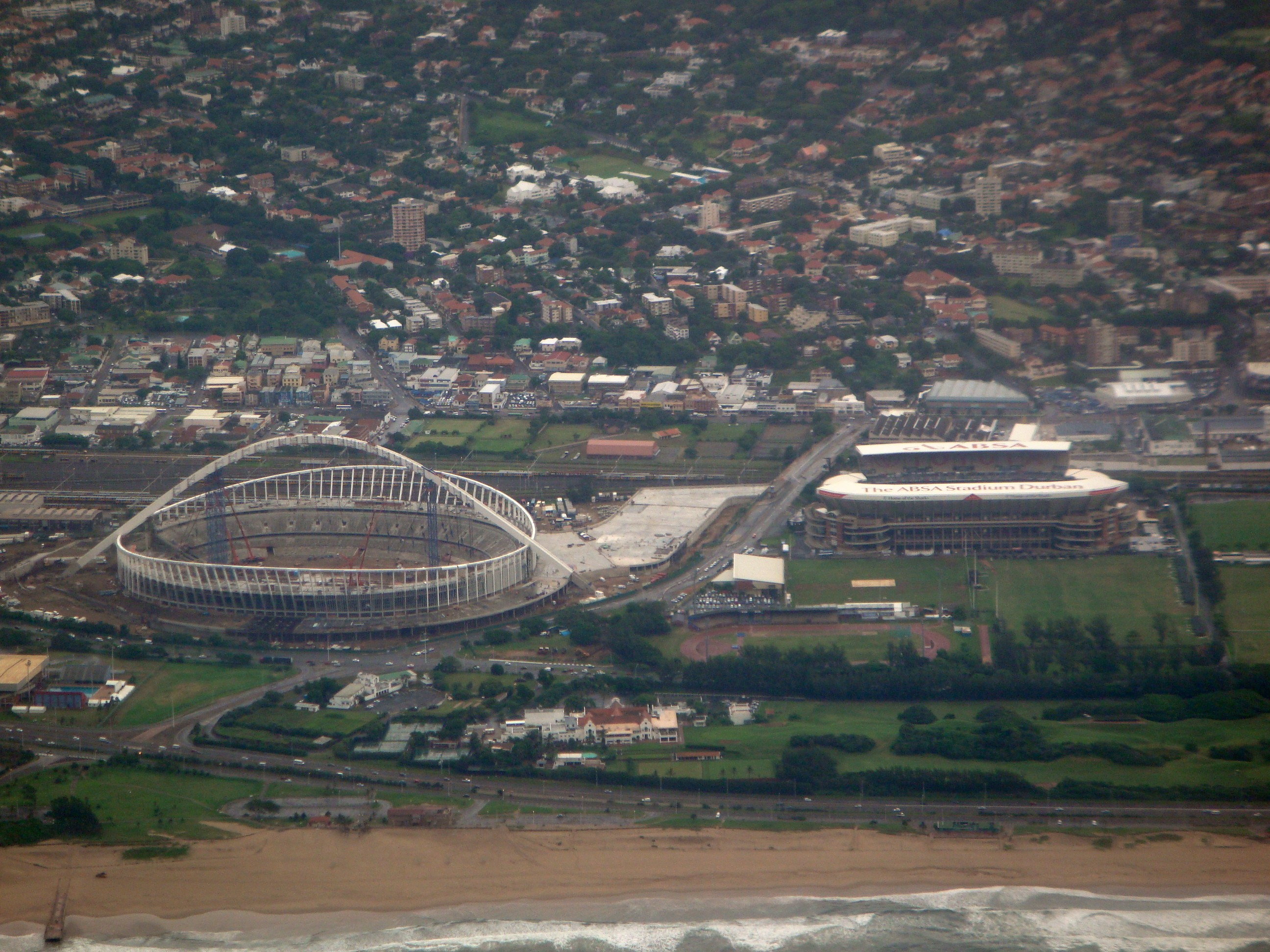
Aerial view of the precinct, under construction, 2009

Kings Park Sporting Precinct is a site located in Stamford Hill, Durban, KwaZulu Natal, South Africa. It was developed primarily to host the 2010 FIFA World Cup, but will also form part of the city's long-term plan to host the Summer Olympics. The precinct regularly hosts domestic and international rugby union and association football events, as well as national and international swimming galas.

The Kings Park Sporting Precinct is managed by the City of Durban.

== Recent developments ==
The Moses Mabhida Stadium was completed in 2009 and involved massive regeneration of the surrounding infrastructure. This included the construction of a pedestrian walkway under NMR Avenue to Oasis/Country Club Beach in the east. This walkway links the stadium to the Golden Mile beachfront. In terms of cultural facilities, the stadium will also contain a sports museum, a multi-media centre and a sports science institute operated by the University of KwaZulu Natal. Walter Gilbert Road, which is situated between Moses Mabhida and Kings Park, is closed and pedestrianised during large events.

== Events ==
Currently, events held in the precinct are dominated by athletics, rugby, and soccer. The precinct also hosts aquatic events at the Kings Park Aquatics Centre, and previously hosted the A1 Grand Prix (the only street circuit in the series). The precinct also serves as part of the routes for the Spar 10 km Ladies Race, East Coast Radio Big Walk and many functions at the Suncoast Casino and Entertainment World.

== Facilities ==
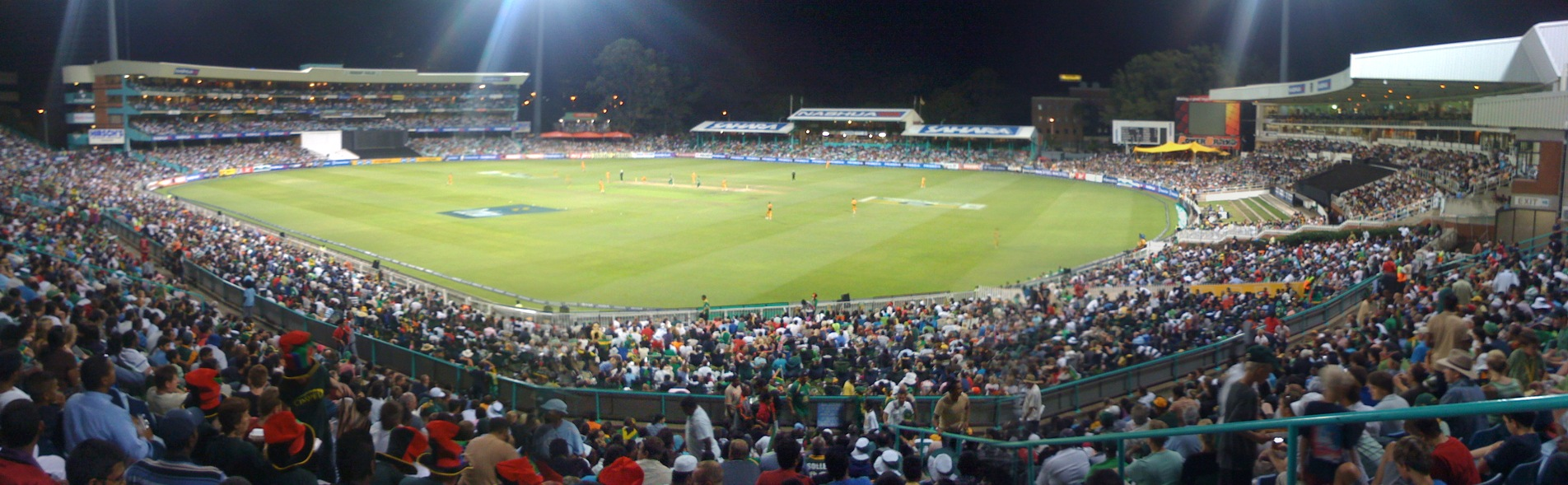
Kingsmead Cricket Stadium

The Kings Park Sporting Precinct currently has the capability to host 42 Olympic Codes and is just under 2 km from Sahara Kingsmead Cricket Stadium and the Greyville Racecourse, home of the Durban July. The Kings Park Sports Medicine Centre is located on Walter Gilbert Road between the two largest stadiums. The precinct, along with the ICC Durban will be the epicentre of the World Transplant Games in 2013.

== Sporting venues ==
- Moses Mabhida Stadium - football, athletics
- Kings Park Stadium - rugby, football, concerts
- Outer Fields, Kings Park - rugby, athletics
- Collegians Athletics Stadium - athletics
- Kings Park Aquatic Centre - aquatics including swimming, diving and synchronised swimming
- Cyril Geoghegan Velodrome - cycling
- Newmarket Stables
- Battery Beaches I and II, Oasis Beach, and Country Club Beach - all ocean sports
- Blue Lagoon / Umgeni River - canoeing
- Stables Archery Range - archery
- Golf courses - Windor Park; Windsor Mashie; Durban Country Club

== Other facilities ==
- Suncoast Casino and Entertainment World
- BMX Track

== Accommodation ==
- Suncoast Casino and Entertainment World

== Transport ==
The precinct is served by a railway line and three stations, Umgeni, Moses Mabhida Stadium and Durban. The M4 provides road access up the north coast and the M12 to the city centre. The R102 (M19) runs inland towards Westville.
