= Kaylene Corbett =

South African swimmer (born 1999)

Personal information
- Nationality: South African
- Born: 15 June 1999 (age 27) Bloemfontein, South Africa
- Height: 1.73 m (5 ft 8 in)

Sport
- Sport: Swimming
- Strokes: Breaststroke
Medal record
Women's swimming
Representing South Africa
Event	1st	2nd	3rd
World Championships (LC)	0	0	1
Commonwealth Games	0	0	1
African Games	5	0	0
African Championships	4	0	0
Pan Pacific Championships	0	0	1
Summer Universiade	0	2	0
Total	9	2	3
World Championships (LC)
Bronze medal – third place	2025 Singapore	200 m breaststroke
Pan Pacific Championships
Bronze medal – third place	2026 Irvine	200 m breaststroke
Commonwealth Games
Bronze medal – third place	2022 Birmingham	200 m breaststroke
African Games
Gold medal – first place	2019 Casablanca	50 m breaststroke
Gold medal – first place	2019 Casablanca	100 m breaststroke
Gold medal – first place	2019 Casablanca	200 m breaststroke
Gold medal – first place	2019 Casablanca	4×100 m medley
Gold medal – first place	2019 Casablanca	4×100 m mixed medley
African Championships
Gold medal – first place	2016 Bloemfontein	50 m breaststroke
Gold medal – first place	2016 Bloemfontein	100 m breaststroke
Gold medal – first place	2016 Bloemfontein	200 m breaststroke
Gold medal – first place	2016 Bloemfontein	4×100 m medley
Summer Universiade
Silver medal – second place	2021 Chengdu	100 m breaststroke
Silver medal – second place	2021 Chengdu	200 m breaststroke

Kaylene Corbett (born 15 June 1999) is a South African swimmer. She competed in the women's 100 metre breaststroke event at the 2017 World Aquatics Championships. At the 2022 Commonwealth Games, she won the bronze medal in the 200 metre breaststroke.

== 2021–2022 ==
In June 2021, she qualified to represent South Africa at the 2020 Summer Olympics. She won the second semi-final of the 200 metre breaststroke and joined her teammate, Tatjana Schoenmaker, in the final. It was the first time since Sydney 2000 that two South African women reached the finals of the same event. Corbett managed fifth place while Schoenmaker took gold.

The following year, in April 2022, she won the silver medal in the 200 metre breaststroke at the year's South Africa National Swimming Championships with a 2022 World Aquatics Championships and 2022 Commonwealth Games qualifying time of 2:24.66. In June, she was named as a member of the South Africa team for the 2022 Commonwealth Games.

=== 2022 Commonwealth Games ===
In her first event as part of swimming at the 2022 Commonwealth Games, the 50 metre breaststroke, Corbett qualified for the semifinals with a time of 31.07 seconds and overall seventh-rank. She swam a time of 31.43 seconds in the semifinals, qualifying for the final along with fellow South Africans Lara van Niekerk and Tatjana Schoenmaker. The following day, she placed sixth in the final with a time of 31.10 seconds. On day three, she qualified for the final of the 200 metre breaststroke ranking fourth in the preliminaries with a time of 2:25.08. In the final, she finished less than two seconds behind gold medalist Tatjana Schoenmaker with a time of 2:23.67 and won the bronze medal. For the preliminaries of the 100 metre breaststroke on day four, she swam a 1:08.12 and qualified for the semifinals ranking eighth. Dropping 0.16 seconds from her time in the semifinals, she ranked seventh and advanced to the final. In the final, she improved her time to a 1:07.62 and placed seventh.
