= Jenna Strauch =

Australian swimmer (born 1997)

Jenna Strauch OLY
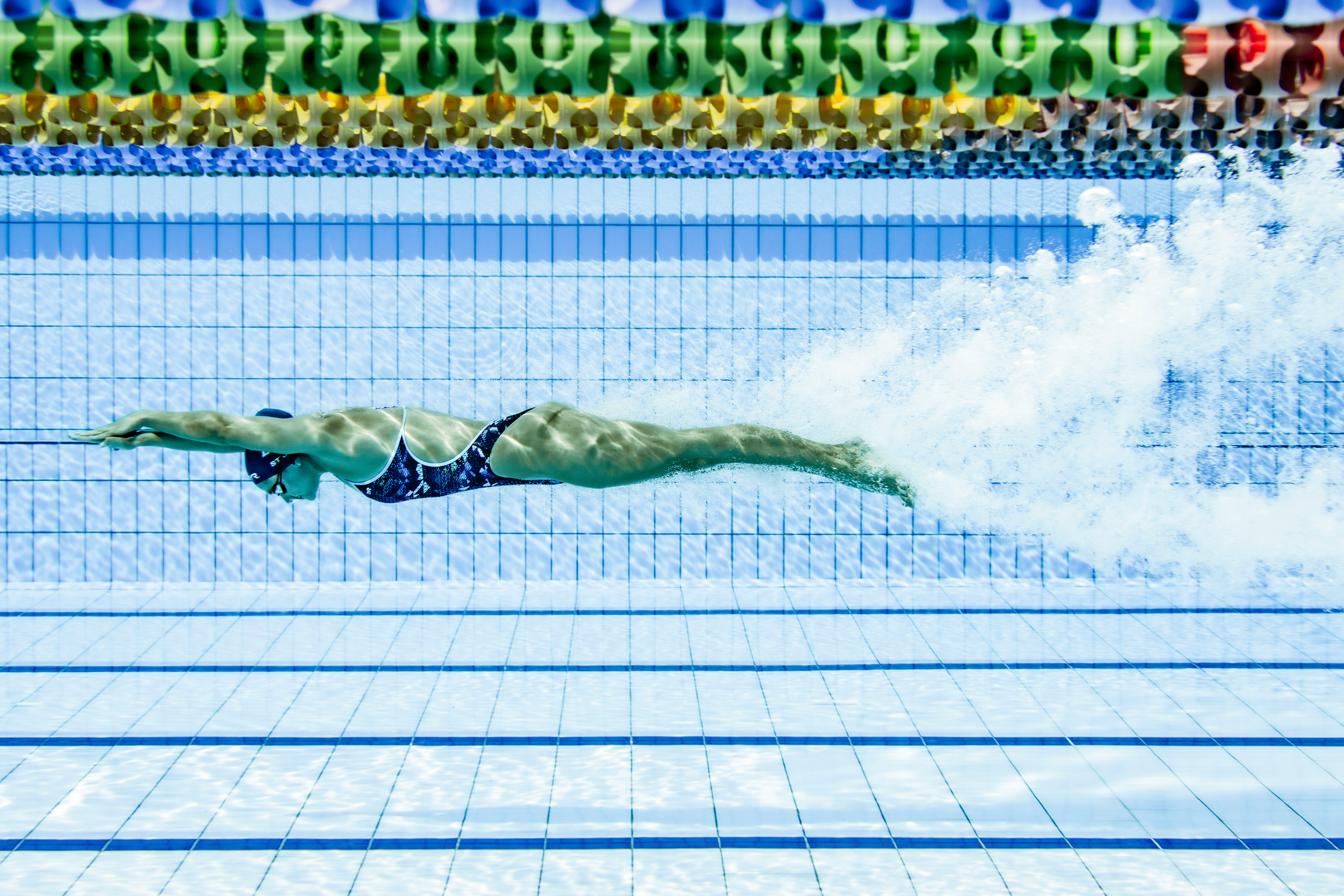
- Strauch in 2021

Personal information
- Full name: Jenna Elise Strauch
- Nationality: Australian
- Born: 24 March 1997 (age 29) Bendigo, Australia

Sport
- Sport: Swimming
- Strokes: Breaststroke
- Club: Rackley Miami
- Coach: Richard Scarce
Medal record
Olympic Games
Silver medal – second place	2024 Paris	4×100 m medley
World Championships (LC)
Silver medal – second place	2022 Budapest	200 m breaststroke
Silver medal – second place	2022 Budapest	4×100 m medley
World Championships (SC)
Gold medal – first place	2022 Melbourne	4×50 m medley
Silver medal – second place	2022 Melbourne	4×100 m medley
Commonwealth Games
Silver medal – second place	2022 Birmingham	200 m breaststroke

Jenna Strauch OLY (born 24 March 1997) is a former Australian swimmer. Jenna first represented Australia at the 2013 FINA World Junior Swimming Championships. She competed in the women's 200 metre breaststroke at the 2019 World Aquatics Championships held in Gwangju, South Korea. Jenna reached the semi-finals and she did not qualify to compete in the final. Jenna then went on to represent Australia in the 2020 Summer Olympics where she made it to the semi-finals in the 200m Breaststroke qualifying 9th fastest in the world.

== Biography ==
After competing at the 2013 FINA World Junior Swimming Championships Jenna then fell ill battling undiagnosed parasites for over a year which saw her take significant time out of the pool. After making a recovering in 2015 she made the move from her home town of Bendigo to the Gold Coast, Queensland. Jenna was the recipient of the Gina Rinehart Swimming Excellence Scholarship through Bond University where she studied Biomedical sciences in 2016. Training under Richard Scarce, Jenna went on the make her first national senior team at the 2018 FINA World Swimming Championships (25 m) She claimed her first national title in 2019 at The Australian National Long Course Championships. This was a breakthrough meet for Jenna which saw her sign deals with TYR Australia. She competed the 2020 Summer Olympics swimming in career best form placing her top 10 in the world.
