= Swimming at the 2016 European Aquatics Championships – Men's 200 metre freestyle =

Men's 200 metre freestyle at the 2016 European Aquatics Championships
- Dates: 17–18 May
- Competitors: 67 from 30 nations
- Winning time: 1:46.02

Medalists
gold medal	Sebastiaan Verschuren	Netherlands
silver medal	Velimir Stjepanović	Serbia
bronze medal	James Guy	Great Britain

The Men's 200 metre freestyle competition of the 2016 European Aquatics Championships was held on 17 and 18 May 2016.

== Records ==
Prior to the competition, the existing world, European and championship records were as follows.

	Name	Nation	Time	Location	Date
World record	Paul Biedermann	Germany	1:42.00	Rome	28 July 2009
European record	Paul Biedermann	Germany	1:42.00	Rome	28 July 2009
Championship record	Pieter van den Hoogenband	Netherlands	1:44.89	Berlin	2 August 2002

== Results ==
=== Heats ===
The heats were held on 17 May at 10:00.

Rank	Heat	Lane	Name	Nationality	Time	Notes
1	8	2	Glenn Surgeloose	Belgium	1:46.93	Q
2	6	4	Velimir Stjepanović	Serbia	1:47.03	Q
3	8	4	James Guy	Great Britain	1:47.11	Q
4	6	5	Maarten Brzoskowski	Netherlands	1:47.35	Q
5	6	2	Matias Koski	Finland	1:47.48	Q
6	8	8	Kacper Majchrzak	Poland	1:47.59	Q
7	6	8	Andrea Mitchell D'Arrigo	Italy	1:47.61	Q
8	7	4	Sebastiaan Verschuren	Netherlands	1:47.69	Q
9	8	3	Dion Dreesens	Netherlands	1:48.05	
10	7	6	Pieter Timmers	Belgium	1:48.09	Q
11	6	7	Lorys Bourelly	France	1:48.16	Q
12	6	6	Louis Croenen	Belgium	1:48.29	
13	8	7	Dominik Kozma	Hungary	1:48.45	Q
14	5	6	Albert Puig	Spain	1:48.73	Q
15	7	5	Jordan Pothain	France	1:48.79	Q
16	8	6	Péter Bernek	Hungary	1:48.80	Q
17	5	4	Víctor Martín	Spain	1:48.81	Q
18	7	1	Kyle Stolk	Netherlands	1:48.83	
19	7	2	Felix Auböck	Austria	1:48.89	Q
20	8	5	Robert Renwick	Great Britain	1:48.95	
21	6	9	Dieter Dekoninck	Belgium	1:48.98	
22	5	2	Jordan Sloan	Ireland	1:49.01	
23	4	2	Doğa Çelik	Turkey	1:49.15	
24	8	9	Tom Kremer	Israel	1:49.36	
25	3	1	Marius Radu	Romania	1:49.39	
26	4	1	Isak Eliasson	Sweden	1:49.53	
27	5	7	Adam Paulsson	Sweden	1:49.57	
28	4	7	Ádám Telegdy	Hungary	1:49.63	
29	7	0	Filippo Megli	Italy	1:49.72	
30	7	3	Duncan Scott	Great Britain	1:49.77	
31	6	1	Alexandre Haldemann	Switzerland	1:49.80	
32	5	0	Dimitrios Dimitriou	Greece	1:49.82	
33	4	6	Kacper Klich	Poland	1:49.97	
34	8	0	Illya Teslenko	Ukraine	1:50.00	
35	3	5	Henning Mühlleitner	Germany	1:50.12	
36	5	5	Henrik Christiansen	Norway	1:50.17	
37	4	8	Christoffer Carlsen	Sweden	1:50.21	
38	4	4	Anže Tavčar	Slovenia	1:50.30	
39	5	9	Nils Liess	Switzerland	1:50.53	
40	5	1	Ido Haber	Israel	1:50.62	
40	7	8	Miguel Durán	Spain	1:50.62	
42	6	0	Alexi Konovalov	Israel	1:50.64	
43	3	7	Aleksi Schmid	Switzerland	1:50.67	
44	3	2	Kregor Zirk	Estonia	1:50.70	
45	7	9	David Brandl	Austria	1:50.93	
46	3	4	Miguel Nascimento	Portugal	1:50.99	
46	2	4	Uroš Nikolić	Serbia	1:50.99	
48	3	3	Kaan Özcan	Turkey	1:51.00	
49	3	8	Gustaf Dahlman	Sweden	1:51.24	
50	2	2	Kemal Arda Gürdal	Turkey	1:51.26	
51	3	6	Ergecan Gezmiş	Turkey	1:51.33	
52	2	5	Pit Brandenburger	Luxembourg	1:51.55	
52	5	3	Alexei Sancov	Moldova	1:51.55	
54	4	3	Markus Lie	Norway	1:51.60	
55	4	9	Stefan Šorak	Serbia	1:51.84	
56	4	0	Petr Novák	Czech Republic	1:52.16	
57	2	3	Pavol Jelenák	Slovakia	1:52.60	
58	3	9	Thomas Liess	Switzerland	1:52.88	
59	7	7	Cameron Kurle	Great Britain	1:53.03	
60	2	6	Irakli Revishvili	Georgia	1:53.19	
61	2	0	Daniel Martin	Romania	1:53.26	
62	2	8	Andri Aedma	Estonia	1:53.43	
63	2	7	Karl Luht	Estonia	1:53.86	
64	1	3	Yonatan Batsha	Israel	1:54.33	
65	2	1	Davide Bernardi	San Marino	1:57.85	
66	1	4	Cristian Santi	San Marino	1:59.12	
67	1	5	Gianluca Pasolini	San Marino	1:59.78	
	3	0	Truls Wigdel	Norway	DNS	
	4	5	Eduardo Solaeche	Spain	DNS	
	5	8	Christos Katrantzis	Greece	DNS	
	6	3	Danas Rapšys	Lithuania	DNS	
	8	1	Clément Mignon	France	DNS	

=== Semifinals ===
The semifinals were held on 17 May at 19:23.

==== Semifinal 1 ====
Rank	Lane	Name	Nationality	Time	Notes
1	6	Sebastiaan Verschuren	Netherlands	1:45.87	Q
2	4	Velimir Stjepanović	Serbia	1:46.04	Q
3	3	Kacper Majchrzak	Poland	1:46.95	Q
4	5	Maarten Brzoskowski	Netherlands	1:47.62	Q
5	1	Péter Bernek	Hungary	1:48.22	
6	2	Lorys Bourelly	France	1:48.71	
7	8	Felix Auböck	Austria	1:48.85	
8	7	Albert Puig	Spain	1:49.29	

==== Semifinal 2 ====
Rank	Lane	Name	Nationality	Time	Notes
1	5	James Guy	Great Britain	1:46.59	Q
2	4	Glenn Surgeloose	Belgium	1:46.91	Q
3	6	Andrea Mitchell D'Arrigo	Italy	1:47.56	Q
4	3	Matias Koski	Finland	1:47.58	Q
5	2	Pieter Timmers	Belgium	1:47.73	
6	7	Dominik Kozma	Hungary	1:47.85	
7	1	Jordan Pothain	France	1:48.35	
8	8	Víctor Martín	Spain	1:48.66	

=== Final ===
The final was held on 18 May at 18:51.

Rank	Lane	Name	Nationality	Time	Notes
1st place, gold medalist(s)	4	Sebastiaan Verschuren	Netherlands	1:46.02	
2nd place, silver medalist(s)	5	Velimir Stjepanović	Serbia	1:46.26	
3rd place, bronze medalist(s)	3	James Guy	Great Britain	1:46.42	
4	1	Matias Koski	Finland	1:46.98	NR
5	6	Glenn Surgeloose	Belgium	1:47.05	
6	2	Kacper Majchrzak	Poland	1:47.45	
7	8	Maarten Brzoskowski	Netherlands	1:47.85	
8	7	Andrea Mitchell D'Arrigo	Italy	1:48.05	
