= Swimming at the 2016 European Aquatics Championships – Men's 100 metre freestyle =

Men's 100 metre freestyle at the 2016 European Aquatics Championships
- Dates: 19–20 May
- Competitors: 88 from 33 nations
- Winning time: 48.25

Medalists
gold medal	Luca Dotto	Italy
silver medal	Sebastiaan Verschuren	Netherlands
bronze medal	Clément Mignon	France

The men's 100 metre freestyle competition of the 2016 European Aquatics Championships was held on 19 and 20 May 2016.

== Records ==
Prior to the competition, the existing world, European and championship records were as follows.

	Name	Nation	Time	Location	Date
World record	César Cielo	Brazil	46.91	Rome	30 July 2009
European record	Alain Bernard	France	47.12	Rome	29 July 2009
Championship record	Alain Bernard	France	47.50	Eindhoven	22 March 2008

== Results ==
=== Heats ===
The heats were held on 19 May at 10:20.

Rank	Heat	Lane	Name	Nationality	Time	Notes
1	8	4	Clément Mignon	France	48.40	Q
2	9	3	Velimir Stjepanović	Serbia	48.59	Q
3	8	5	Sebastiaan Verschuren	Netherlands	48.61	Q
4	8	6	Glenn Surgeloose	Belgium	48.64	Q
5	10	4	Luca Dotto	Italy	48.68	Q
6	9	4	Jérémy Stravius	France	48.82	Q
7	9	5	Pieter Timmers	Belgium	48.84	Q
8	10	5	Andrey Grechin	Russia	48.86	Q
9	8	8	Richárd Bohus	Hungary	48.92	Q
10	9	2	Kristian Golomeev	Greece	48.94	Q
11	10	3	Mehdy Metella	France	49.15	
12	10	6	Simonas Bilis	Lithuania	49.17	Q
13	10	1	Kacper Majchrzak	Poland	49.21	Q
14	10	2	Filippo Magnini	Italy	49.25	Q
15	7	2	Anže Tavčar	Slovenia	49.27	Q
16	8	9	Dieter Dekoninck	Belgium	49.29	
17	9	0	Marius Radu	Romania	49.31	Q
18	9	6	Duncan Scott	Great Britain	49.36	Q
19	8	2	Luca Leonardi	Italy	49.37	
20	9	1	Markel Alberdi	Spain	49.42	
21	7	0	Doğa Çelik	Turkey	49.46	
22	9	8	Dominik Kozma	Hungary	49.51	
22	6	3	Tom Kremer	Israel	49.51	
24	6	0	Matias Koski	Finland	49.53	
25	8	1	Péter Holoda	Hungary	49.59	
25	6	6	Curtis Coulter	Ireland	49.59	
27	7	1	Kemal Arda Gürdal	Turkey	49.73	
28	7	5	Mindaugas Sadauskas	Lithuania	49.75	
29	10	0	Isak Eliasson	Sweden	49.77	
30	8	0	Christos Katrantzis	Greece	49.78	
31	7	4	Miguel Ortiz-Cañavate	Spain	49.85	
32	7	9	Ben Schwietert	Netherlands	49.86	
33	10	7	Odyssefs Meladinis	Greece	49.88	
33	4	2	Norbert Trandafir	Romania	49.88	
35	7	3	Kyle Stolk	Netherlands	49.89	
36	9	9	Jonathan Boffa	Italy	49.99	
37	8	3	Benjamin Proud	Great Britain	50.02	
38	9	7	Jasper Aerents	Belgium	50.04	
39	10	9	Ari-Pekka Liukkonen	Finland	50.05	
39	10	8	Krisztián Takács	Hungary	50.05	
41	6	1	Maarten Brzoskowski	Netherlands	50.09	
42	5	4	Andrej Barna	Serbia	50.10	
43	4	3	Mislav Sever	Croatia	50.15	
44	3	0	Alin Coste	Romania	50.20	
45	5	3	Shane Ryan	Ireland	50.22	
45	7	6	David Gamburg	Israel	50.22	
47	6	5	Bruno Ortiz-Cañavate	Spain	50.29	
48	6	7	Alexi Konovalov	Israel	50.30	
49	6	8	Emre Sakçı	Turkey	50.33	
50	3	5	Miguel Nascimento	Portugal	50.35	
51	4	4	Julien Henx	Luxembourg	50.40	
51	7	8	Christoffer Carlsen	Sweden	50.40	
53	3	4	Uroš Nikolić	Serbia	50.48	
53	6	2	Oskitz Aguilar	Spain	50.48	
55	5	0	Søren Dahl	Denmark	50.55	
56	6	9	Alexandre Haldemann	Switzerland	50.56	
57	4	1	Ivan Levaj	Croatia	50.59	
58	4	6	Heiko Gigler	Austria	50.64	
59	4	5	Povilas Strazdas	Lithuania	50.66	
60	5	1	Baslakov İskender	Turkey	50.72	
61	6	4	Daniel Macovei	Romania	50.75	
62	5	8	Markus Lie	Norway	50.77	
63	5	7	Erik van Dooren	Switzerland	50.78	
64	7	7	Pjotr Degtjarjov	Estonia	50.86	
65	3	2	Robin Andreasson	Sweden	50.95	
66	4	0	Daniel Forndal	Sweden	50.96	
67	3	6	Alexei Sancov	Moldova	51.03	
68	3	7	Felix Auböck	Austria	51.07	
69	3	9	Kregor Zirk	Estonia	51.11	
70	4	7	Illya Teslenko	Ukraine	51.15	
71	4	9	Raphaël Stacchiotti	Luxembourg	51.16	
72	5	6	Jordan Sloan	Ireland	51.23	
73	4	8	Aleksi Schmid	Switzerland	51.42	
74	2	7	Gabriel Lopes	Portugal	51.43	
75	3	8	Andri Aedma	Estonia	51.44	
76	3	3	Cameron Kurle	Great Britain	51.50	
77	3	1	David Brandl	Austria	51.58	
77	2	3	Tadas Duškinas	Lithuania	51.58	
79	5	5	Ziv Kalontarov	Israel	51.68	
80	2	4	Pit Brandenburger	Luxembourg	51.72	
81	2	5	Matthew Zammit	Malta	51.80	
82	2	8	Omiros Zagkas	Cyprus	51.89	
83	2	1	Vahan Mkhitaryan	Armenia	53.12	
84	2	0	Davide Bernardi	San Marino	53.41	
85	1	4	Vladimir Mamikonyan	Armenia	53.76	
86	1	5	Cristian Santi	San Marino	55.04	
87	1	3	Gianluca Pasolini	San Marino	55.13	
88	2	6	Pavel Izbisciuc	Moldova	55.74	
	2	2	Ilijan Malčić	Bosnia and Herzegovina	DNS	
	5	2	Ralf Tribuntsov	Estonia	DNS	
	5	9	Mario Todorović	Croatia	DNS	
	8	7	Robert Renwick	Great Britain	DNS	

=== Semifinals ===
The semifinals were held on 19 May at 18:22.

==== Semifinal 1 ====
Rank	Lane	Name	Nationality	Time	Notes
1	4	Velimir Stjepanović	Serbia	48.62	Q
2	5	Glenn Surgeloose	Belgium	48.83	Q
3	3	Jérémy Stravius	France	48.86	Q
4	6	Andrey Grechin	Russia	48.87	Q
5	1	Anže Tavčar	Slovenia	48.88	
6	2	Kristian Golomeev	Greece	48.92	
7	7	Kacper Majchrzak	Poland	49.11	
7	8	Duncan Scott	Great Britain	49.11	

==== Semifinal 2 ====
Rank	Lane	Name	Nationality	Time	Notes
1	3	Luca Dotto	Italy	48.36	Q
2	4	Clément Mignon	France	48.59	Q
3	5	Sebastiaan Verschuren	Netherlands	48.65	Q
4	6	Pieter Timmers	Belgium	48.76	Q
5	7	Simonas Bilis	Lithuania	48.89	
6	2	Richárd Bohus	Hungary	48.99	
7	8	Marius Radu	Romania	49.11	
8	1	Filippo Magnini	Italy	49.18	

=== Final ===
The final was held on 20 May at 18:47.

Rank	Lane	Name	Nationality	Time	Notes
1st place, gold medalist(s)	4	Luca Dotto	Italy	48.25	
2nd place, silver medalist(s)	6	Sebastiaan Verschuren	Netherlands	48.32	
3rd place, bronze medalist(s)	5	Clément Mignon	France	48.36	
4	1	Jérémy Stravius	France	48.53	
5	2	Pieter Timmers	Belgium	48.64	
6	3	Velimir Stjepanović	Serbia	48.72	
7	7	Glenn Surgeloose	Belgium	48.75	
8	8	Andrey Grechin	Russia	48.85	
