= Belgium at the 2016 Summer Olympics =

- IOC code: BEL
- NOC: Belgian Olympic and Interfederal Committee
- Website: www.teambelgium.be (in Dutch and French)

in Rio de Janeiro
- Competitors: 108 in 19 sports
- Flag bearers: Olivia Borlée (opening); Nafissatou Thiam (closing)
- Medals Ranked 35th: Gold 2 Silver 2 Bronze 2 Total 6

Summer Olympics appearances (overview)
- 1900; 1904; 1908; 1912; 1920; 1924; 1928; 1932; 1936; 1948; 1952; 1956; 1960; 1964; 1968; 1972; 1976; 1980; 1984; 1988; 1992; 1996; 2000; 2004; 2008; 2012; 2016; 2020; 2024; 2028

Other related appearances
- 1906 Intercalated Games

Belgium competed at the 2016 Summer Olympics in Rio de Janeiro, Brazil, from 5 to 21 August 2016. Since the nation's official debut in 1900, Belgian athletes had appeared in every edition of the Summer Olympic Games, with the exception of the 1904 Summer Olympics in St. Louis. The Belgian team consisted of 108 athletes, 70 men and 38 women, across nineteen sports.

Belgium returned home from Rio de Janeiro with six medals (two in each color), which matched its overall tally from the 1996 Summer Olympics in Atlanta. A third of the medal tally was distributed to the Belgian cyclists, including the first ever gold of the Games won by Greg Van Avermaet in the men's road race. These Games also marked a historic first for the Belgians on the podium in collective sports after nearly a century, bringing them home a silver medal in the men's field hockey tournament. Indeed, the Belgian men surpassed their female counterparts in the medal count for the first time since 1988.

Apart from Van Avermaet and the men's field hockey team, other medals were distributed to the following athletes on the Belgian roster: a gold to Nafissatou Thiam, who edged out the defending champion Jessica Ennis-Hill of Great Britain in the women's heptathlon; a silver to Pieter Timmers, who became the first Belgian swimmer to ascend the Olympic podium, since Frédérik Deburghgraeve captured the gold in Atlanta two decades earlier; and two bronzes to judoka and three-time Olympian Dirk Van Tichelt (men's lightweight) and track cyclist Jolien D'Hoore (women's omnium).

== Medalists ==
Medal	Name	Sport	Event	Date
Gold	Greg Van Avermaet	Cycling	Men's road race	August 6
Gold	Nafissatou Thiam	Athletics	Women's heptathlon	August 13
Silver	Pieter Timmers	Swimming	Men's 100 m freestyle	August 10
Silver	Belgium men's national field hockey team: Arthur Van Doren; John-John Dohmen; Florent van Aubel; Sebastien Dockier; Cédric Charlier; Gauthier Boccard; Emmanuel Stockbroekx; Thomas Briels; Felix Denayer; Vincent Vanasch; Simon Gougnard; Loïck Luypaert; Tom Boon; Jérôme Truyens; Elliot Van Strydonck; Tanguy Cosyns	Field hockey	Men's tournament	August 18
Bronze	Dirk Van Tichelt	Judo	Men's 73 kg	August 8
Bronze	Jolien D'Hoore	Cycling	Women's omnium	August 16

Medals by sport
Sport	1st place, gold medalist(s)	2nd place, silver medalist(s)	3rd place, bronze medalist(s)	Total
Cycling	1	0	1	2
Athletics	1	0	0	1
Hockey	0	1	0	1
Swimming	0	1	0	1
Judo	0	0	1	1
Total	2	2	2	6

Medals by day
Day	Date	1st place, gold medalist(s)	2nd place, silver medalist(s)	3rd place, bronze medalist(s)	Total
Day 1	6 August	1	0	0	1
Day 2	7 August	0	0	0	0
Day 3	8 August	0	0	1	1
Day 4	9 August	0	0	0	0
Day 5	10 August	0	1	0	1
Day 6	11 August	0	0	0	0
Day 7	12 August	0	0	0	0
Day 8	13 August	1	0	0	1
Day 9	14 August	0	0	0	0
Day 10	15 August	0	0	0	0
Day 11	16 August	0	0	1	1
Day 12	17 August	0	0	0	0
Day 13	18 August	0	1	0	1
Day 14	19 August	0	0	0	0
Day 15	20 August	0	0	0	0
Day 16	21 August	0	0	0	0
Total		2	2	2	6

Medals by gender
Gender	1st place, gold medalist(s)	2nd place, silver medalist(s)	3rd place, bronze medalist(s)	Total
Male	1	2	1	4
Female	1	0	1	2
Total	2	2	2	6

== Competitors ==
The Belgian Olympic and Interfederal Committee fielded a roster of 108 athletes, 70 men and 38 women, to compete across nineteen different sports at these Games; it was the nation's second-largest delegation sent to the Olympics, falling short of the record achieved in London 2012 (111) by a few athletes. Roughly three quarters of the nation's full roster size were made up of males more than their female counterparts, due to the attendance of the men's field hockey squad and the proliferation of men in judo, swimming, and track and field making the cut.

For individual-based sports, Belgium made its Olympic debut in golf (new to the 2016 Games), as well as its return to fencing after 12 years and archery after 16 years. Additionally, the Belgian female gymnasts were selected to compete in the team all-around for the first time at these Games after nearly seven decades. Track and field accounted for the largest number of athletes on the Belgian team, with 26 entries, while there was a single competitor each in archery, sprint canoeing, fencing, rowing, shooting, and weightlifting.

The Belgian roster featured London 2012 bronze medalists Charline Van Snick (women's extra-lightweight judo) and sailing veteran Evi Van Acker (Laser Radial), taekwondo fighter and former Iranian refugee Raheleh Asemani (women's 57 kg), world-ranked tennis player David Goffin, rising heptathlon star Nafissatou Thiam, badminton siblings Yuhan and Lianne Tan, and the prominent Borlée track and field quartet of twins and three-time Olympians Kévin and Jonathan, their younger brother Dylan, and their lone sister and 2008 relay champion Olivia, who eventually served as the nation's flag bearer in the opening ceremony.

Fifteen-year-old gymnast Senna Deriks, who helped the Belgians secure one of available berths in the women's team all-around at the Games, was the country's youngest competitor, with equestrian eventing rider and four-time Olympian Joris Vanspringel rounding out the lineup as the oldest competitor (aged 53). Vanspringel's teammate Karin Donckers topped the list of most experienced athletes on the Belgian roster, by becoming the country's first female to participate in her record six Olympics.

The following is the list of number of competitors in the Games. Note that reserves in fencing, field hockey, football, and handball are not counted as athletes:

Sport	Men	Women	Total
Archery	1	0	1
Athletics	15	11	26
Badminton	1	1	2
Canoeing	1	0	1
Cycling	8	8	16
Equestrian	3	2	5
Fencing	1	0	1
Field hockey	16	0	16
Golf	2	1	3
Gymnastics	1	5	6
Judo	4	1	5
Rowing	1	0	1
Sailing	3	1	4
Shooting	1	0	1
Swimming	7	2	9
Taekwondo	2	1	3
Tennis	1	2	3
Triathlon	2	2	4
Weightlifting	1	0	1
Total	70	38	108

== Archery ==
One Belgian archer has qualified for the men's individual recurve at the Olympics by virtue of a top five national finish at the 2016 Archery World Cup meet in Antalya, Turkey, signifying the nation's Olympic return to the sport for the first time since 2000.

Athlete	Event	Ranking round		Round of 64	Round of 32	Round of 16	Quarterfinals	Semifinals	Final / BM	
Athlete	Event	Score	Seed	Opposition Score	Opposition Score	Opposition Score	Opposition Score	Opposition Score	Opposition Score	Rank
Robin Ramaekers	Men's individual	654	42	Tyack (AUS); W 6–2	Rodríguez (ESP); L 0–6	did not advance				

== Athletics ==
Belgian athletes have so far achieved qualifying standards in the following athletics events (up to a maximum of 3 athletes in each event):

Key

- Note–Ranks given for track events are within the athlete's heat only
- Q = Qualified for the next round
- q = Qualified for the next round as a fastest loser or, in field events, by position without achieving the qualifying target
- NR = National record
- N/A = Round not applicable for the event
- Bye = Athlete not required to compete in round

Track & road events
Men

Athlete	Event	Heat		Semifinal		Final	
Athlete	Event	Result	Rank	Result	Rank	Result	Rank
Bashir Abdi	5000 m	13:42.83	16	—N/a		did not advance	
Bashir Abdi	10000 m	—N/a				28:01.49	20
Jonathan Borlée	200 m	20.64	5	did not advance			
Jonathan Borlée	400 m	46.01	4	did not advance			
Kevin Borlée	400 m	45.90	5	did not advance			
Michaël Bultheel	400 m hurdles	49.37	5 q	49.46	5	did not advance	
Florent Caelen	Marathon	—N/a				2:17:59	44
Jeroen D'hoedt	3000 m steeplechase	8:48.29	13	—N/a		did not advance	
Pieter-Jan Hannes	1500 m	3:38.89	8 q	3:43.71	12	did not advance	
Koen Naert	Marathon	—N/a				2:14:53	22
Willem Van Schuerbeeck	Marathon	—N/a				2:18:56	56
Jonathan Borlée; Kevin Borlée; Dylan Borlée; Antoine Gillet; Robin Vanderbemden; Julien Watrin	4 × 400 m relay	2:59.25 NR	1 Q	—N/a		2:58.52 NR	4

Women

Athlete	Event	Heat		Semifinal		Final	
Athlete	Event	Result	Rank	Result	Rank	Result	Rank
Cynthia Bolingo	200 m	23.98	8	did not advance			
Olivia Borlée	200 m	23.53	7	did not advance			
Louise Carton	5000 m	15:34.39	11	—N/a		did not advance	
Axelle Dauwens	400 m hurdles	57.68	7	did not advance			
Veerle Dejaeghere	Marathon	—N/a				2:37:39	47
Renée Eykens	800 m	2:00.00	4 q	2:00.45	5	did not advance	
Els Rens	Marathon	—N/a				2:45:52	84
Manuela Soccol	Marathon	—N/a				2:44:18	74
Anne Zagré	100 m hurdles	12.85	2 Q	DSQ		did not advance	

Field events

Athlete	Event	Qualification		Final	
Athlete	Event	Distance	Position	Distance	Position
Philip Milanov	Men's discus throw	62.68	12 q	62.22	9

Combined events – Men's decathlon

Athlete	Event	100 m	LJ	SP	HJ	400 m	110H	DT	PV	JT	1500 m	Final	Rank
Thomas Van der Plaetsen	Result	11.24	7.66	12.84	2.16	49.63	15.01	43.58	5.40	62.09	4:32.21	8332	8
Thomas Van der Plaetsen	Points	808	975	657	953	832	848	738	1035	769	717	8332	8

Combined events – Women's heptathlon

Athlete	Event	100H	HJ	SP	200 m	LJ	JT	800 m	Final	Rank
Nafissatou Thiam	Result	13.56	1.98	14.91	25.10	6.58	53.13	2:16.54	6810	1st place, gold medalist(s)
Nafissatou Thiam	Points	1041	1211	855	878	1033	921	871	6810	1st place, gold medalist(s)

== Badminton ==
Belgium has qualified two badminton players for each of the following events into the Olympic tournament. London 2012 siblings Yuhan and Lianne Tan were selected among the top 34 individual shuttlers each in the men's and women's singles based on the BWF World Rankings as of 5 May 2016.

Athlete	Event	Group Stage				Elimination	Quarterfinal	Semifinal	Final / BM	
Athlete	Event	Opposition Score	Opposition Score	Opposition Score	Rank	Opposition Score	Opposition Score	Opposition Score	Opposition Score	Rank
Yuhan Tan	Men's singles	Zilberman (ISR); L (20–22, 12–21)	Chou T-c (TPE); L (14–21, 8–21)	—N/a	3	did not advance				
Lianne Tan	Women's singles	Wang (USA); L (17–21, 22–20, 14–21)	Li Xr (CHN); L (11–21, 11–21)	Santos (POR); W (21–16, 21–18)	3	did not advance				

== Canoeing ==
=== Sprint ===
Belgium has received an unused host quota place in the men's K-1 1000 m to the Olympics, as the next highest-ranked eligible nation, not yet qualified, at the 2015 ICF Canoe Sprint World Championships.

Athlete	Event	Heats		Semifinals		Final	
Athlete	Event	Time	Rank	Time	Rank	Time	Rank
Artuur Peters	Men's K-1 1000 m	3:34.178	5 Q	3:37.586	7 FB	3:33.521	11

Qualification Legend: FA = Qualify to final (medal); FB = Qualify to final B (non-medal)

== Cycling ==
=== Road ===
Belgian riders qualified for the following quota places in the men's and women's Olympic road race by virtue of their top 15 final national ranking in the 2015 UCI World Tour (for men) and top 22 in the UCI World Ranking (for women). The women's road cycling team was named to the Olympic roster on June 9, 2016, with the men joining them on July 22.

Men

Athlete	Event	Time	Rank
Laurens De Plus	Road race	did not finish	
Philippe Gilbert	Road race	6:23.23	42
Serge Pauwels	Road race	6:16.17	22
Greg Van Avermaet	Road race	6:10.05	1st place, gold medalist(s)
Tim Wellens	Road race	did not finish	
Tim Wellens	Time trial	1:16:49.71	20

Women

Athlete	Event	Time	Rank
Ann-Sophie Duyck	Road race	did not finish	
Ann-Sophie Duyck	Time trial	48:17.60	23
Lotte Kopecky	Road race	4:02:07	45
Lotte Kopecky	Time trial	48:09.86	21
Anisha Vekemans	Road race	3:58:03	29

=== Track ===
Following the completion of the 2016 UCI Track Cycling World Championships, Belgian riders have accumulated spots in both the men's and women's omnium, by virtue of their final individual UCI Olympic rankings in those events.

Omnium

Athlete	Event	Scratch race		Individual pursuit			Elimination race		Time trial			Flying lap			Points race		Total points	Rank
Athlete	Event	Rank	Points	Time	Rank	Points	Rank	Points	Time	Rank	Points	Time	Rank	Points	Points	Rank	Total points	Rank
Jasper De Buyst	Men's omnium	18	6	4:36.246	16	12	15	10	DNS			DNS			DNS		28	DNF
Jolien D'Hoore	Women's omnium	3	36	3:30.202	3	36	2	38	35.326	4	34	14.195	7	28	27	8	199	3rd place, bronze medalist(s)

=== Mountain biking ===
Belgian mountain bikers qualified for two men's and one women's quota place into the Olympic cross-country race, as a result of the nation's ninth-place finish for men and twelfth for women, respectively, in the UCI Olympic Ranking List of May 25, 2016. The mountain biking team was named to the Olympic roster on June 9, 2016.

Athlete	Event	Time	Rank
Ruben Scheire	Men's cross-country	1:37:36	11
Jens Schuermans	Men's cross-country	1:39:30	18
Githa Michiels	Women's cross-country	1:40:23	21

=== BMX ===
Belgian riders qualified for one women's quota place in BMX at the Olympics, as a result of the nation's top three finish for women in the UCI BMX Individual Ranking List of May 31, 2016. BMX cyclist Elke Vanhoof was named to the Olympic roster on June 9, 2016.

Athlete	Event	Seeding		Semifinal		Final	
Athlete	Event	Result	Rank	Points	Rank	Result	Rank
Elke Vanhoof	Women's BMX	35.325	6	13	3 Q	39.538	6

== Equestrian ==
Belgium has entered two jumping riders into the Olympic equestrian competition by virtue of their top four finish outside the group selection in the individual FEI Olympic Rankings. Two eventing riders and one dressage rider have been added to the squad by virtue of the following results in the individual FEI Olympic rankings: a top nine finish from the combined overall in eventing, and a top two finish from South Western Europe in dressage.

Belgian equestrian team was named on July 12, 2016.

=== Dressage ===
Athlete	Horse	Event	Grand Prix		Grand Prix Special		Grand Prix Freestyle		Overall	
Athlete	Horse	Event	Score	Rank	Score	Rank	Technical	Artistic	Score	Rank
Jorinde Verwimp	Tiamo	Individual	70.771	35	did not advance					

=== Eventing ===
Athlete	Horse	Event	Dressage		Cross-country			Jumping						Total	
Athlete	Horse	Event	Dressage		Cross-country			Qualifier			Final			Total	
Athlete	Horse	Event	Penalties	Rank	Penalties	Total	Rank	Penalties	Total	Rank	Penalties	Total	Rank	Penalties	Rank
Karin Donckers	Fletcha van't Verahof	Individual	41.10	7	Eliminated			did not advance							
Joris Vanspringel	Lully des Aulnes	Individual	54.30	52	21.60	75.90	26	8.00	83.90	25 Q	4.00	87.90	24	87.90	24

=== Jumping ===
Athlete	Horse	Event	Qualification								Final					Total	
Athlete	Horse	Event	Round 1		Round 2			Round 3			Round A		Round B			Total	
Athlete	Horse	Event	Penalties	Rank	Penalties	Total	Rank	Penalties	Total	Rank	Penalties	Rank	Penalties	Total	Rank	Penalties	Rank
Jérôme Guery	Grand Cru	Individual	0	=1 Q	10	10	=44 Q	5	15	37 Q	8	28	did not advance			8	28
Nicola Philippaerts	Zilverstar	Individual	DSQ		did not advance												

== Fencing ==
Belgium has entered one fencer into the Olympic competition, signifying the nation's sporting comeback for the first time since 2004. Seppe van Holsbeke had claimed his Olympic spot in the men's sabre by finishing among the top four individuals at the European Zonal Qualifier in Prague, Czech Republic.

Athlete	Event	Round of 32	Round of 16	Quarterfinal	Semifinal	Final / BM	
Athlete	Event	Opposition Score	Opposition Score	Opposition Score	Opposition Score	Opposition Score	Rank
Seppe van Holsbeke	Men's sabre	Dershwitz (USA); W 15–12	Dolniceanu (ROU); L 13–15	did not advance			

== Field hockey ==
Summary

Key:

- FT – After full time.
- P – Match decided by penalty-shootout.

Team	Event	Group Stage						Quarterfinal	Semifinal	Final / BM	
Team	Event	Opposition Score	Opposition Score	Opposition Score	Opposition Score	Opposition Score	Rank	Opposition Score	Opposition Score	Opposition Score	Rank
Belgium men's	Men's tournament	Great Britain; W 4–1	Brazil; W 12–0	Australia; W 1–0	Spain; W 3–1	New Zealand; L 1–3	1	India; W 3–1	Netherlands; W 3–1	Argentina; L 2–4	2nd place, silver medalist(s)

=== Men's tournament ===
Belgium men's field hockey team qualified for the Olympics by having achieved a top three finish at the second stop of the 2014–15 Men's FIH Hockey World League Semifinals. Only three nations qualified through this route, but India had already secured qualification as the continental champion after the team's success at the 2014 Asian Games, leaving the remaining teams to automatically receive the three quotas.

Team roster

The following is the Belgium roster in the men's field hockey tournament of the 2016 Summer Olympics.

Head coach: Shane McLeod

4. Arthur Van Doren
7. John-John Dohmen (C)
8. Florent van Aubel
9. Sebastien Dockier
10. Cédric Charlier
12. Gauthier Boccard
15. Emmanuel Stockbroekx
17. Thomas Briels
19. Felix Denayer
21. Vincent Vanasch (GK)
22. Simon Gougnard
25. Loïck Luypaert
27. Tom Boon
28. Jérôme Truyens
29. Elliot Van Strydonck
32. Tanguy Cosyns

Reserves:

- Alexandre de Paeuw
- Jeremy Gucassoff (GK)
- Alexander Hendrickx

Group play

Pos	Team	Pld	W	D	L	GF	GA	GD	Pts	Qualification
1	Belgium	5	4	0	1	21	5	+16	12	Quarter-finals
2	Spain	5	3	1	1	13	6	+7	10	Quarter-finals
3	Australia	5	3	0	2	13	4	+9	9	Quarter-finals
4	New Zealand	5	2	1	2	17	8	+9	7	Quarter-finals
5	Great Britain	5	1	2	2	14	10	+4	5	
6	Brazil (H)	5	0	0	5	1	46	−45	0	

Source: Rio2016
Rules for classification: 1) Points; 2) Matches won; 3) Goal difference; 4) Goals for; 5) Head-to-head result.
(H) Hosts

6 August 2016
12:30

Belgium	4–1	Great Britain
Truyens 5'; Cosyns 32'; Gougnard 35'; Charlier 56'	Report	Catlin 27'

Umpires:
John Weight (RSA)
Coen van Bunge (NED)

7 August 2016
19:30

Brazil	0–12	Belgium
	Report	Van Aubel 12'; Van Doren 14', 54'; Cosyns 18', 53'; Denayer 25'; Truyens 28'; Boccard 33'; Briels 33'; Dockier 41'; Charlier 48'; Dohmen 51'

Umpires:
Germán Montes de Oca (ARG)
Javed Shaikh (IND)

9 August 2016
20:30

Belgium	1–0	Australia
Cosyns 16'	Report

Umpires:
John Wright (RSA)
Marcin Grochal (POL)

11 August 2016
13:30

Spain	1–3	Belgium
Quemada 41'	Report	Charlier 6'; Stockbroekx 16'; Charlier 21'

Umpires:
Christian Blasch (GER)
Germán Montes de Oca (ARG)

12 August 2016
18:00

Belgium	1–3	New Zealand
Van Aubel 58'	Report	Child 31'; Wilson 37'; Inglis 52'

Umpires:
Germán Montes de Oca (ARG)
John Wright (RSA)

Quarterfinal

14 August 2016
12:30

Belgium	3–1	India
Dockier 34', 45'; Boon 50'	Report	A. Singh 15'

Umpires:
Simon Taylor (NZL)
Nathan Stagno (GBR)

Semifinal

16 August 2016
17:00

Belgium	3–1	Netherlands
Truyens 25'; Dohmen 29' van Aubel 46'	Report	van der Weerden 29'

Umpires:
Germán Montes de Oca (ARG)
Murray Grime (AUS)

Gold medal match

18 August 2016
17:00

Belgium	2–4	Argentina
Cosyns 3'; Boccard 45'	Report	P. Ibarra 12'; Ortiz 15'; Peillat 22'; Mazzilli 60'

Umpires:
John Wright (RSA)
Christian Blasch (GER)

== Golf ==
Belgium has entered three golfers into the Olympic tournament. Nicolas Colsaerts (world no. 124), Thomas Pieters (world no. 66), and Chloe Leurquin (world no. 402) qualified directly among the top 60 eligible players for their respective individual events based on the IGF World Rankings as of 11 July 2016.

Athlete	Event	Round 1	Round 2	Round 3	Round 4	Total		
Athlete	Event	Score	Score	Score	Score	Score	Par	Rank
Nicolas Colsaerts	Men's	68	71	71	73	283	−1	=30
Thomas Pieters	Men's	67	66	77	65	275	−9	4
Chloe Leurquin	Women's	79	78	71	75	303	+19	56

== Gymnastics ==
=== Artistic ===
Belgium has fielded a full squad of six artistic gymnasts (one man and five women) into the Olympic competition. The women's squad had claimed one of the remaining four spots in the team all-around for the first time since 1948, while an additional Olympic berth had been awarded to the Belgian male gymnast, who participated in the apparatus and all-around events at the Olympic Test Event in Rio de Janeiro. Lone male gymnast Dennis Goossens, along with the women's squad, were named to the Belgian roster for the Games on July 14, 2016.

Men

Athlete	Event	Qualification								Final							
Athlete	Event	Apparatus						Total	Rank	Apparatus						Total	Rank
Athlete	Event	F	PH	R	V	PB	HB	Total	Rank	F	PH	R	V	PB	HB	Total	Rank
Dennis Goossens	Rings	—N/a		15.366	—N/a			15.366	7 Q	—N/a		14.933	—N/a			14.933	8

Women
Team

Athlete	Event	Qualification						Final					
Athlete	Event	Apparatus				Total	Rank	Apparatus				Total	Rank
Athlete	Event	V	UB	BB	F	Total	Rank	V	UB	BB	F	Total	Rank
Senna Deriks	Team	14.000	13.533	—N/a				did not advance					
Nina Derwael	Team	13.900	15.133	13.966	13.533	56.532	19 Q	did not advance					
Rune Hermans	Team	13.133	13.775	13.700	13.900	54.508	34	did not advance					
Gaëlle Mys	Team	14.133	—N/a	13.833	13.566	—N/a		did not advance					
Laura Waem	Team	—N/a	14.133	13.966	13.366	—N/a		did not advance					
Total	Team	42.033	43.041	41.765	40.999	167.838	12	did not advance					

Individual finals

Athlete	Event	Apparatus				Total	Rank
Athlete	Event	V	UB	BB	F	Total	Rank
Nina Derwael	All-around	13.966	15.300	13.300	13.733	56.299	19

== Judo ==
Belgium has qualified a total of five judokas for each of the following weight classes at the Games. Jasper Lefevere, Toma Nikiforov, London 2012 Olympians Joachim Bottieau and bronze medalist Charline van Snick, and two-time Olympian Dirk van Tichelt were ranked among the top 22 eligible judokas for men and top 14 for women in the IJF World Ranking List of May 30, 2016.

Athlete	Event	Round of 64	Round of 32	Round of 16	Quarterfinals	Semifinals	Repechage	Final / BM	
Athlete	Event	Opposition Result	Opposition Result	Opposition Result	Opposition Result	Opposition Result	Opposition Result	Opposition Result	Rank
Jasper Lefevere	Men's −66 kg	Smagulov (KAZ); L 000–000 S	did not advance						
Dirk Van Tichelt	Men's −73 kg	Bye	Zemouri (QAT); W 100–000	An C-r (KOR); W 010–000	Iartcev (RUS); W 011–010	Ono (JPN); L 000–111	Bye	Ungvári (HUN); W 100–000	3rd place, bronze medalist(s)
Joachim Bottieau	Men's −81 kg	Bye	Marconcini (ITA); L 000–000 S	did not advance					
Toma Nikiforov	Men's −100 kg	Bye	Mahjoub (IRI); W 100–000	Gviniashvili (GEO); L 000–101	did not advance				
Charline Van Snick	Women's −48 kg	—N/a	Ungureanu (ROU); W 100–000	Menezes (BRA); L 000–001	did not advance				

== Rowing ==
Belgium has qualified one boat in the men's single sculls for the Olympics by virtue of his top three finish at the 2016 European & Final Qualification Regatta in Lucerne, Switzerland.

Athlete	Event	Heats		Repechage		Quarterfinals		Semifinals		Final	
Athlete	Event	Time	Rank	Time	Rank	Time	Rank	Time	Rank	Time	Rank
Hannes Obreno	Men's single sculls	7:09.06	1 QF	Bye		6:48.90	1 SA/B	7:06.76	3 FA	6:47.42	4

Qualification Legend: FA=Final A (medal); FB=Final B (non-medal); FC=Final C (non-medal); FD=Final D (non-medal); FE=Final E (non-medal); FF=Final F (non-medal); SA/B=Semifinals A/B; SC/D=Semifinals C/D; SE/F=Semifinals E/F; QF=Quarterfinals; R=Repechage

== Sailing ==
Belgian sailors have qualified one boat in each of the following classes through the 2014 ISAF Sailing World Championships, the individual fleet Worlds, and Oceanian qualifying regattas. They also picked up a spare Olympic berth freed by Africa as the next highest-ranked eligible crew in the 49er class based on the results at the 2015 World Championships. The sailing crew, highlighted by London 2012 bronze medalist Evi van Acker, was named to the Olympic roster on June 2, 2016.

Athlete	Event	Race													Net points	Final rank
Athlete	Event	1	2	3	4	5	6	7	8	9	10	11	12	M*	Net points	Final rank
Wannes Van Laer	Men's Laser	27	~~30~~	12	11	23	12	23	13	1	18	—N/a		EL	140	17
Yannick Lefèbvre; Tom Pelsmaekers	Men's 49er	19	14	13	17	9	3	8	8	12	~~20~~	14	8	EL	125	17
Evi Van Acker	Women's Laser Radial	2	13	2	~~29~~	16	15	11	2	1	5	—N/a		6	78	4

M = Medal race; EL = Eliminated – did not advance into the medal race

== Shooting ==
Belgium has qualified one shooter in the men's trap by securing an available Olympic berth at the 2015 World Shotgun Championships in Lonato, Italy, as long as he obtained a minimum qualifying score (MQS) by March 31, 2016. The berth was awarded to rookie Maxime Mottet, as one of the nominated athletes from the second batch being named to the Olympic team.

Athlete	Event	Qualification		Semifinal		Final	
Athlete	Event	Points	Rank	Points	Rank	Points	Rank
Maxime Mottet	Men's trap	116	10	did not advance			

Qualification Legend: Q = Qualify for the next round; q = Qualify for the bronze medal (shotgun)

== Swimming ==
Belgian swimmers have so far achieved qualifying standards in the following events (up to a maximum of 2 swimmers in each event at the Olympic Qualifying Time (OQT), and potentially 1 at the Olympic Selection Time (OST)):

Men

Athlete	Event	Heat		Semifinal		Final	
Athlete	Event	Time	Rank	Time	Rank	Time	Rank
Jasper Aerents	50 m freestyle	22.61	39	did not advance			
Basten Caerts	200 m breaststroke	2:13.44	32	did not advance			
Louis Croenen	200 m butterfly	1:56.48	14 Q	1:56.03	8 Q	1:57.04	8
François Heersbrandt	50 m freestyle	22.58	38	did not advance			
Glenn Surgeloose	100 m freestyle	48.65	19	did not advance			
Glenn Surgeloose	200 m freestyle	1:47.19	17 Q*	1:47.36	14	did not advance	
Pieter Timmers	100 m freestyle	48.46	9 Q	48.14 NR	6 Q	47.80 NR	2nd place, silver medalist(s)
Emmanuel Vanluchene	200 m individual medley	2:01.36	23	did not advance			
Jasper Aerents; Dieter Dekoninck; Glenn Surgeloose; Pieter Timmers; Emmanuel Vanluchene	4 × 100 m freestyle relay	3:14.16	7 Q	—N/a		3:13.57 NR	6
Louis Croenen; Dieter Dekoninck; Glenn Surgeloose; Pieter Timmers; Emmanuel Vanluchene	4 × 200 m freestyle relay	7:08.72	6 Q	—N/a		7:11.64	8

Women

Athlete	Event	Heat		Semifinal		Final	
Athlete	Event	Time	Rank	Time	Rank	Time	Rank
Kimberly Buys	100 m butterfly	57.91 NR	12 Q	58.63	14	did not advance	
Fanny Lecluyse	100 m breaststroke	1:08.80	28	did not advance			
Fanny Lecluyse	200 m breaststroke	2:27.16	17	did not advance			

== Taekwondo ==
Belgium entered three athletes into the taekwondo competition at the Olympics. Si Mohamed Ketbi and Jaouad Achab qualified automatically for their respective weight classes by finishing in the top 6 WTF Olympic rankings. Initially a member of the Refugee Olympic Athletes, Iranian-born Raheleh Asemani acquired a dual citizenship to compete internationally for Belgium at the Olympics by virtue of a top two finish in the women's lightweight category (57 kg) at the European Qualification Tournament in Istanbul, Turkey.

Athlete	Event	Round of 16	Quarterfinals	Semifinals	Repechage	Final / BM	
Athlete	Event	Opposition Result	Opposition Result	Opposition Result	Opposition Result	Opposition Result	Rank
Si Mohamed Ketbi	Men's −58 kg	Khalil (AUS); L 1–8	did not advance				
Jaouad Achab	Men's −68 kg	M Kassman (PNG); W 15–1 PTG	Robak (POL); W 9–7	Denisenko (RUS); L 1–6	Bye	Lee D-h (KOR); L 7–11	5
Raheleh Asemani	Women's −57 kg	Carstens (PAN); W 13–1 PTG	Jones (GBR); L 2–7	Did not advance	Bakkal (MAR); W 12–0 PTG	Malak (EGY); L 0–1	5

== Tennis ==
Belgium has entered three tennis players (one man and two women) into the Olympic tournament. David Goffin (world no. 11), Kirsten Flipkens (world no. 61), and Yanina Wickmayer (world no. 50) qualified directly among the top 56 eligible players for their respective singles events based on the ATP and WTA World Rankings as of June 6, 2016.

Athlete	Event	Round of 64	Round of 32	Round of 16	Quarterfinals	Semifinals	Final / BM	
Athlete	Event	Opposition Score	Opposition Score	Opposition Score	Opposition Score	Opposition Score	Opposition Score	Rank
David Goffin	Men's singles	Groth (AUS); W 6–4, 6–2	Sela (ISR); W 6–3, 6–3	Bellucci (BRA); L 6–7^{(10–12)}, 4–6	did not advance			
Kirsten Flipkens	Women's singles	V Williams (USA); W 4–6, 6–3, 7–6^{(7–5)}	Šafářová (CZE); W 6–2, ret	Siegemund (GER); L 4–6, 3–6	did not advance			
Yanina Wickmayer	Women's singles	Strýcová (CZE); L 6–7^{(6–8)}, 1–6	did not advance					
Kirsten Flipkens; Yanina Wickmayer	Women's doubles	—N/a	Voskoboeva / Shvedova (KAZ); W 6–1, ret	Muguruza / Suárez Navarro (ESP); L 5–7, 6–2, 2–6	did not advance			

== Triathlon ==
Belgium has qualified four triathletes for each of the following events at the Olympics. Jelle Geens, Marten van Riel, Claire Michel, and Katrien Verstuyft were ranked among the top 40 eligible triathletes each in the men's and women's event, respectively, based on the ITU Olympic Qualification List as of May 15, 2016.

Athlete	Event	Swim (1.5 km)	Trans 1	Bike (40 km)	Trans 2	Run (10 km)	Total Time	Rank
Jelle Geens	Men's	18:36	0:49	59:14	0:37	32:49	1:52:05	38
Marten Van Riel	Men's	17:27	0:49	55:03	0:34	32:10	1:46:03	6
Claire Michel	Women's	21:11	0:56	Lapped				
Katrien Verstuyft	Women's	22:08	1:00	Lapped				

== Weightlifting ==
Belgium has received an unused quota place from IWF to send a male weightlifter to the Olympics, as a response to the complete ban of the Russian weightlifting team from the Games due to "multiple positive" cases of doping.

Athlete	Event	Snatch		Clean & Jerk		Total	Rank
Athlete	Event	Result	Rank	Result	Rank	Total	Rank
Tom Goegebuer	Men's −56 kg	111	12	130	14	241	14

== See also ==
- Belgium at the 2016 Summer Paralympics
