= Swimming at the 2016 European Aquatics Championships – Men's 4 × 200 metre freestyle relay =

Men's 4 × 200 metre freestyle relay at the 2016 European Aquatics Championships
- Dates: 21 May
- Competitors: 77 from 17 nations
- Teams: 17
- Winning time: 7:07.82

Medalists
gold medal	Dion Dreesens; Maarten Brzoskowski; Kyle Stolk; Sebastiaan Verschuren	Netherlands
silver medal	Louis Croenen; Glenn Surgeloose; Dieter Dekoninck; Pieter Timmers	Belgium
bronze medal	Andrea Mitchell D'Arrigo; Filippo Magnini; Luca Dotto; Gabriele Detti	Italy

The Men's 4 × 200 metre freestyle relay competition of the 2016 European Aquatics Championships was held on 21 May 2016.

== Records ==
Prior to the competition, the existing world, European and championship records were as follows.

	Nation	Time	Location	Date
World record	United States	6:58.55	Rome	31 July 2009
European record	Russia	6:59.15	Rome	31 July 2009
Championship record	Russia	7:06.71	Budapest	14 August 2010

== Results ==
=== Heats ===
The heats were held at 09:47.

Rank	Heat	Lane	Nation	Swimmers	Time	Notes
1	2	3	Hungary	Ádám Telegdy (1:49.31); Gergő Kis (1:48.50); Péter Bernek (1:47.40); Dominik Kozma (1:47.25)	7:12.46	Q
2	2	5	Great Britain	Stephen Milne (1:48.45); Ieuan Lloyd (1:48.57); Daniel Wallace (1:49.14); Duncan Scott (1:47.52)	7:13.68	Q
3	1	7	France	Jérémy Stravius (1:48.22); Jordan Pothain (1:48.70); Yannick Agnel (1:48.28); Lorys Bourelly (1:48.63)	7:13.83	Q
4	1	8	Belgium	Dieter Dekoninck (1:49.19); Lorenz Weiremans (1:49.06); Louis Croenen (1:48.64); Glenn Surgeloose (1:47.08)	7:13.97	Q
5	1	6	Netherlands	Dion Dreesens (1:46.93); Ben Schwietert (1:49.05); Joost Reijns (1:49.95); Kyle Stolk (1:48.14)	7:14.07	Q
6	2	2	Italy	Andrea Mitchell D'Arrigo (1:48.19); Filippo Megli (1:49.50); Jonathan Boffa (1:49.14); Filippo Magnini (1:47.51)	7:14.34	Q
7	2	7	Poland	Jan Świtkowski (1:48.48); Kacper Klich (1:48.98); Kacper Majchrzak (1:47.84); Wojciech Wojdak (1:50.61)	7:15.91	Q
8	2	1	Israel	Tom Kremer (1:48.85); Alexi Konovalov (1:49.64); Ido Haber (1:48.97); David Gamburg (1:48.79)	7:16.25	Q
9	2	4	Sweden	Adam Paulsson (1:49.75); Isak Eliasson (1:48.30); Christoffer Carlsen (1:48.41); Victor Johansson (1:49.86)	7:16.32	
10	2	0	Spain	Marc Sanchez Torrens (1:49.35); Víctor Martín (1:48.41); Albert Puig (1:48.23); Eduardo Solaeche (1:51.18)	7:17.17	
11	1	5	Serbia	Velimir Stjepanović (1:46.74); Uroš Nikolić (1:50.20); Stefan Šorak (1:49.82); Andrej Barna (1:50.60)	7:17.36	
12	1	1	Switzerland	Alexandre Haldemann (1:49.55); Nils Liess (1:49.44); Jérémy Desplanches (1:49.96); Aleksi Schmid (1:51.52)	7:20.47	
13	2	6	Austria	Felix Auboeck (1:49.45); David Brandl (1:49.16); Sebastian Steffan (1:52.18); Heiko Gigler (1:52.10)	7:22.89	
14	1	3	Turkey	Nezir Karap (1:51.04); Doğa Çelik (1:50.39); Kaan Özcan (1:51.10); Ergecan Gezmiş (1:51.05)	7:23.58	
15	2	8	Slovenia	Anže Tavčar (1:50.36); Martin Bau (1:50.96); Robert Žbogar (1:51.25); Grega Popović (1:52.02)	7:24.59	
16	1	4	Norway	Henrik Christiansen (1:50.25); Markus Lie (1:51.29); Truls Wigdel (1:52.21); Sindri Jakobsson (1:53.97)	7:27.72	
17	1	2	Estonia	Kregor Zirk (1:51.27); Andri Aedma (1:54.43); Karl Luht (1:54.55); Martin Liivamägi (1:52.93)	7:33.18	

=== Final ===
The final was held at 18:03.

Rank	Lane	Nation	Swimmers	Time	Notes
1st place, gold medalist(s)	2	Netherlands	Dion Dreesens (1:47.92); Maarten Brzoskowski (1:46.55); Kyle Stolk (1:47.88); Sebastiaan Verschuren (1:45.47)	7:07.82	
2nd place, silver medalist(s)	6	Belgium	Louis Croenen (1:48.47); Glenn Surgeloose (1:46.12); Dieter Dekoninck (1:47.70); Pieter Timmers (1:45.99)	7:08.28	
3rd place, bronze medalist(s)	7	Italy	Andrea Mitchell D'Arrigo (1:47.57); Filippo Magnini (1:47.82); Luca Dotto (1:47.52); Gabriele Detti (1:45.39)	7:08.30	
4	1	Poland	Jan Świtkowski (1:47.43); Paweł Korzeniowski (1:47.46); Kacper Klich (1:47.82); Kacper Majchrzak (1:45.60)	7:08.31	NR
5	3	France	Lorys Bourelly (1:49.38); Yannick Agnel (1:46.25); Jordan Pothain (1:47.15); Jérémy Stravius (1:46.40)	7:09.18	
6	5	Great Britain	Robert Renwick (1:48.72); James Guy (1:45.64); Stephen Milne (1:48.57); Duncan Scott (1:47.80)	7:10.73	
7	4	Hungary	Dominik Kozma (1:48.30); Gergő Kis (1:49.06); Ádám Telegdy (1:48.71); Péter Bernek (1:46.92)	7:12.99	
8	8	Israel	Tom Kremer (1:48.66); Alexi Konovalov (1:49.03); Ido Haber (1:49.98); David Gamburg (1:49.15)	7:16.82	
