= Swimming at the 2016 Summer Olympics – Men's 200 metre freestyle =

Men's 200 metre freestyle at the Games of the XXXI Olympiad
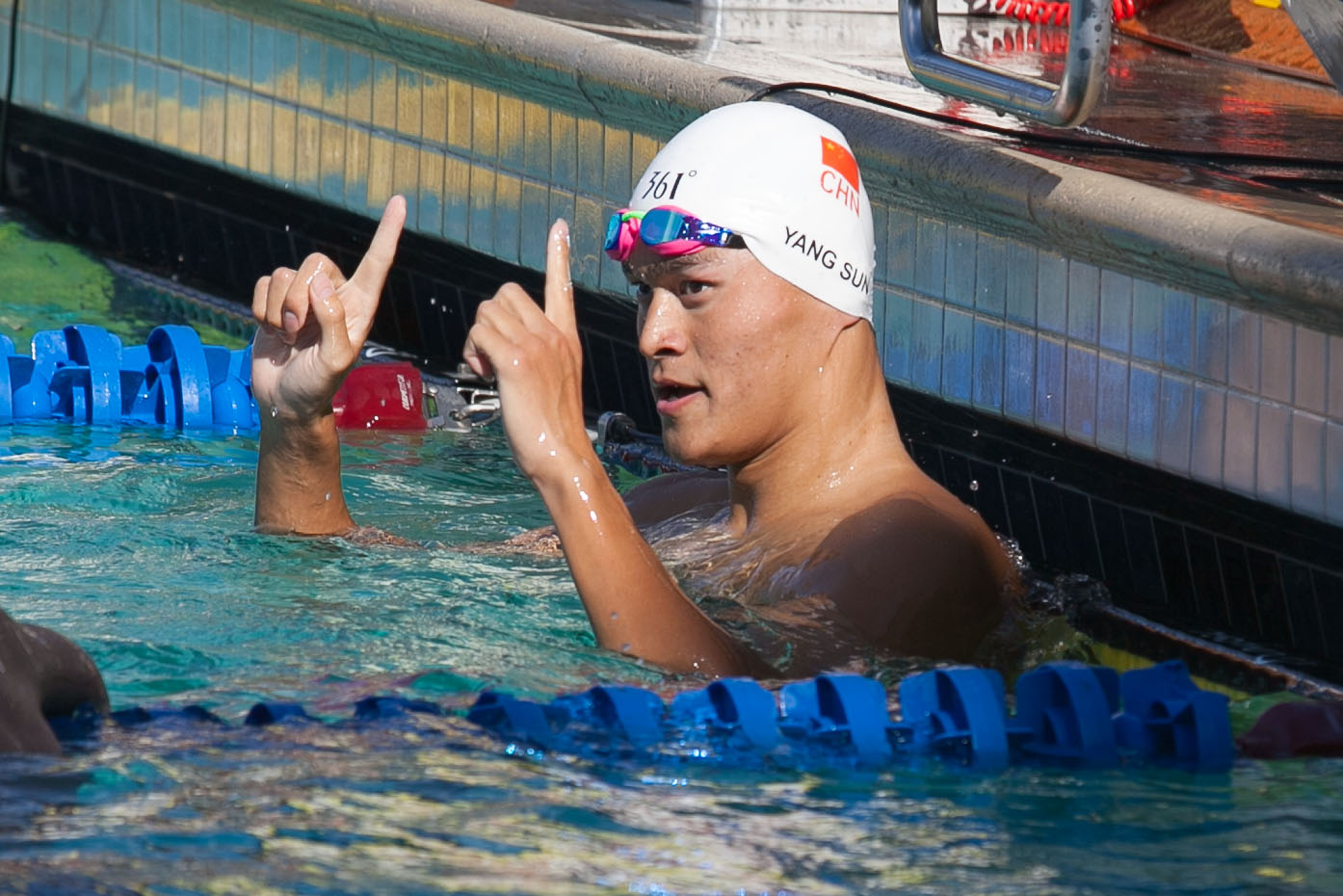
- Gold medalist Sun Yang (earlier in 2016)
- Venue: Olympic Aquatics Stadium
- Dates: 7 August 2016 (heats & semifinals); 8 August 2016 (final)
- Competitors: 47 from 36 nations
- Winning time: 1:44.65

Medalists
1st place, gold medalist(s)		Sun Yang	China
2nd place, silver medalist(s)		Chad le Clos	South Africa
3rd place, bronze medalist(s)		Conor Dwyer	United States

The men's 200 metre freestyle event at the 2016 Summer Olympics took place between 7–8 August at the Olympic Aquatics Stadium. There were 47 competitors from 36 nations.

== Summary ==
After a runner-up feat in the 400 m freestyle two days earlier, China's Sun Yang put up a monumental effort for the Olympic mid-distance freestyle title in a race against Chad le Clos of South Africa and Conor Dwyer of the United States. Hanging with the leaders at the 150-metre turn, Sun made a late charge on the final lap to edge out Le Clos in front and did not let Dwyer pass him for the gold medal in 1:44.65. Despite his early jump to the immediate lead before the final stretch, Le Clos could not hold off Sun to finish with a silver and an African record time in 1:45.20. Meanwhile, Dwyer powered home with a bronze in 1:45.23. Sun was the sixth man to win multiple medals in the event. Le Clos's silver was South Africa's first medal in the men's 200 metre freestyle.

Swimming on the outside lane, 2015 World champion James Guy of Great Britain improved upon his position to finish fourth with a 1:45.49. Dwyer's teammate Townley Haas claimed the fifth spot in 1:45.58, while Germany's world record holder Paul Biedermann (1:45.84), Japan's Kosuke Hagino (1:45.90), the Olympic champion in the 400 m individual medley, and Russia's Aleksandr Krasnykh (1:45.91) rounded out the field.

Other notable swimmers featured France's Yannick Agnel, who missed a chance to defend his Olympic title after fading to nineteenth in the prelims with a 1:47.35, and two-time silver medalist Park Tae-hwan of South Korea, who posted a twenty-ninth-place time of 1:48.06 in his fourth Olympic appearance. Shortly after the Games, Agnel, aged 24, officially confirmed his retirement from international swimming.

The medals for the competition were presented by Tsunekazu Takeda, Japan, member of the International Olympic Committee and the gifts were presented by Kazuo Sano, Bureau Member of FINA.

== Background ==
This was the 15th appearance of the 200 metre freestyle event. It was first contested in 1900. It would be contested a second time, though at 220 yards, in 1904. After that, the event did not return until 1968; since then, it has been on the programme at every Summer Games.

Five of the 8 finalists from the 2012 Games returned: gold medalist Yannick Agnel of France, silver medalists Sun Yang of China and Park Tae-hwan of South Korea, fifth-place finisher Paul Biedermann of Germany, and seventh-place finisher Thomas Fraser-Holmes of Australia. Agnel had won the 2013 World Championship; James Guy of Great Britain had won in 2015. Sun was favoured, having had the strongest season so far in 2016.

Antigua and Barbuda, Aruba, Jordan, Palestine, and Samoa each made their debut in the event. Australia made its 15th appearance, the only nation to have competed in all prior editions of the event.

== Qualification ==
Each National Olympic Committee (NOC) could enter up to two swimmers if both met the Olympic Qualifying Time (or "OQT"). An NOC with no swimmers meeting the OQT but at least one swimmer meeting the Olympic Selection Time (or "OST") was not guaranteed a place, but was eligible for selection to fill the overall 900 swimmer quota for the Games. For 2016, the OQT was 1:47.97 while the OST was 1:51.75. The qualifying window was 1 March 2015 to 3 July 2016; only approved meets (generally international competitions and national Olympic trials) during that period could be used to meet the standards. There were also universality places available; if no male swimmer from a nation qualified in any event, the NOC could enter one male swimmer in an event.

The two swimmers per NOC limit had been in place since the 1984 Games.

== Competition format ==
The competition followed the format established in 2000, with three rounds: heats, semifinals, and a final. The advancement rule followed the format introduced in 1952. A swimmer's place in the heat was not used to determine advancement; instead, the fastest times from across all heats in a round were used. The top 16 swimmers from the heats advanced to the semifinals. The top 8 semifinalists advanced to the final. Swim-offs were used as necessary to break ties.

This swimming event used freestyle swimming, which means that the method of the stroke is not regulated (unlike backstroke, breaststroke, and butterfly events). Nearly all swimmers use the front crawl or a variant of that stroke. Because an Olympic-size swimming pool is 50 metres long, this race consisted of four lengths of the pool.

== Records ==
Prior to this competition, the existing world and Olympic records were as follows.

World record	Paul Biedermann (GER)	1:42.00	Rome, Italy	28 July 2009
Olympic record	Michael Phelps (USA)	1:42.96	Beijing, China	12 August 2008

== Schedule ==
All times are Brasília Time (UTC−3)

Date	Time	Round
Sunday, 7 August 2016	13:19; 22:11	Heats; Semifinals
Monday, 8 August 2016	22:21	Final

== Results ==
=== Heats ===
The heats began at 1:19pm.

Rank	Heat	Lane	Swimmer	Nation	Time	Notes
1	5	4	Sun Yang	China	1:45.75	Q
2	4	4	Paul Biedermann	Germany	1:45.78	Q
3	5	6	Chad le Clos	South Africa	1:45.89	Q
4	6	3	Conor Dwyer	United States	1:45.95	Q
5	4	5	Townley Haas	United States	1:46.13	Q
5	6	4	James Guy	Great Britain	1:46.13	Q
7	6	5	Kosuke Hagino	Japan	1:46.19	Q
8	5	3	Sebastiaan Verschuren	Netherlands	1:46.32	Q
9	5	5	Thomas Fraser-Holmes	Australia	1:46.49	Q
10	6	6	Velimir Stjepanovic	Serbia	1:46.64	Q
11	4	6	Jérémy Stravius	France	1:46.67	Q, WD*
12	4	8	Dominik Kozma	Hungary	1:46.68	Q
13	5	7	Myles Brown	South Africa	1:46.78	Q
14	2	4	Cristian Quintero	Venezuela	1:47.02	Q, NR
15	5	1	Kacper Majchrzak	Poland	1:47.12	Q
16	6	7	Alexander Krasnykh	Russia	1:47.15	Q
17	4	7	Glenn Surgeloose	Belgium	1:47.19	Q
18	3	6	Felix Auböck	Austria	1:47.24	
19	4	3	Yannick Agnel	France	1:47.35	
20	3	7	Matthew Stanley	New Zealand	1:47.37	
21	6	8	Matias Koski	Finland	1:47.40	
22	3	4	Federico Grabich	Argentina	1:47.41	
23	3	3	Andrea Mitchell D'Arrigo	Italy	1:47.46	
24	3	8	Marwan El-Kamash	Egypt	1:47.52	
25	4	2	João de Lucca	Brazil	1:47.63	
26	3	2	Welson Sim	Malaysia	1:47.67	
27	6	1	Dion Dreesens	Netherlands	1:47.76	
28	5	8	Christoph Fildebrandt	Germany	1:47.81	
29	6	2	Park Tae-hwan	South Korea	1:48.06	
30	5	2	David McKeon	Australia	1:48.38	
31	1	4	Khader Baqlah	Jordan	1:48.42	
32	2	6	Shang Keyuan	China	1:48.46	
33	2	5	Marco Belotti	Italy	1:48.71	
34	1	3	Alexei Sancov	Moldova	1:48.85	
35	2	3	Cameron Kurle	Great Britain	1:49.08	
36	3	1	Nikita Lobintsev	Russia	1:49.35	
37	3	5	Péter Bernek	Hungary	1:49.73	
38	2	2	Alexandre Haldemann	Switzerland	1:49.94	
39	1	5	Anže Tavčar	Slovenia	1:49.96	
40	2	1	Henrik Christiansen	Norway	1:50.09	
41	2	7	Hoàng Quý Phước	Vietnam	1:50.39	
41	2	8	Ahmed Mathlouthi	Tunisia	1:50.39	
43	1	6	Marcelo Acosta	El Salvador	1:51.46	
44	1	7	Noah Mascoll-Gomes	Antigua and Barbuda	1:53.16	
45	1	2	Mikel Schreuders	Aruba	1:55.10	
46	1	1	Brandon Schuster	Samoa	1:57.72	
47	1	8	Ahmed Gebrel	Palestine	1:59.71	
—	4	1	Nicolas Oliveira	Brazil	DNS	

* Qualified, but pulled out of semi-finals to focus on 4 × 100 m freestyle relay.

=== Semifinals ===
Rank	Heat	Lane	Swimmer	Nation	Time	Notes
1	2	4	Sun Yang	China	1:44.63	Q
2	2	6	Kosuke Hagino	Japan	1:45.45	Q
3	1	5	Conor Dwyer	United States	1:45.55	Q
4	1	4	Paul Biedermann	Germany	1:45.69	Q
4	2	8	Aleksandr Krasnykh	Russia	1:45.69	Q
6	2	3	Townley Haas	United States	1:45.92	Q
7	2	5	Chad le Clos	South Africa	1:45.94	Q
8	1	3	James Guy	Great Britain	1:46.23	Q
9	2	2	Thomas Fraser-Holmes	Australia	1:46.24	
10	1	1	Kacper Majchrzak	Poland	1:46.30	NR
11	1	6	Sebastiaan Verschuren	Netherlands	1:46.34	
12	1	7	Myles Brown	South Africa	1:46.57	
13	1	2	Velimir Stjepanović	Serbia	1:47.28	
14	1	8	Glenn Surgeloose	Belgium	1:47.36	
15	2	7	Dominik Kozma	Hungary	1:47.53	
16	2	1	Cristian Quintero	Venezuela	1:48.00	

=== Final ===
Rank	Lane	Swimmer	Nation	Time	Notes
1st place, gold medalist(s)	4	Sun Yang	China	1:44.65	
2nd place, silver medalist(s)	1	Chad le Clos	South Africa	1:45.20	AF
3rd place, bronze medalist(s)	3	Conor Dwyer	United States	1:45.23	
4	8	James Guy	Great Britain	1:45.49	
5	7	Townley Haas	United States	1:45.58	
6	6	Paul Biedermann	Germany	1:45.84	
7	5	Kosuke Hagino	Japan	1:45.90	
8	2	Aleksandr Krasnykh	Russia	1:45.91	
