= Swimming at the 2016 Summer Olympics – Men's 100 metre freestyle =

Men's 100 metre freestyle at the Games of the XXXI Olympiad
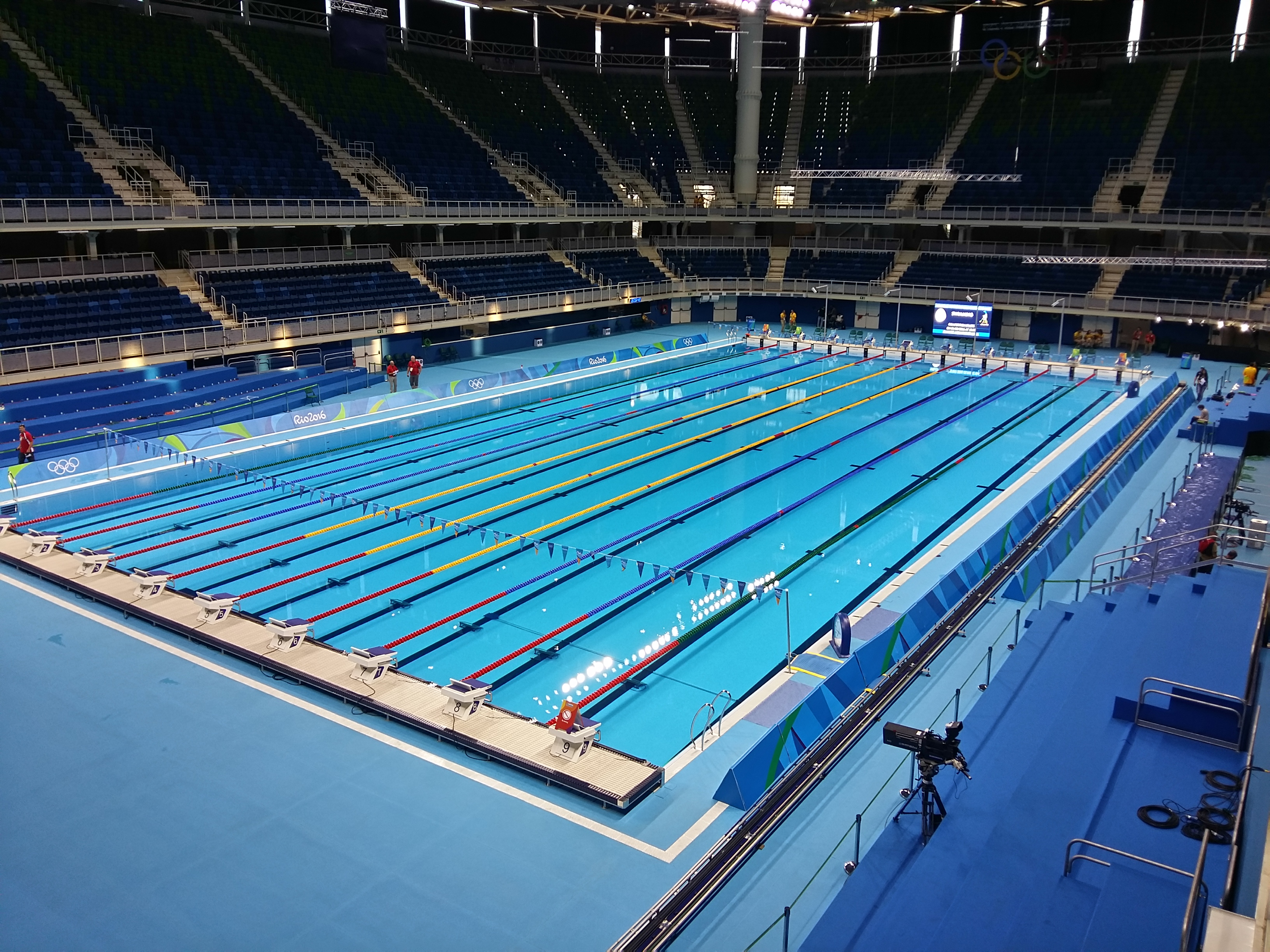
- Aquatics stadium
- Venue: Olympic Aquatics Stadium
- Dates: 9 August 2016 (heats & semifinals); 10 August 2016 (final)
- Competitors: 59 from 46 nations
- Winning time: 47.58 WJ

Medalists
1st place, gold medalist(s)		Kyle Chalmers	Australia
2nd place, silver medalist(s)		Pieter Timmers	Belgium
3rd place, bronze medalist(s)		Nathan Adrian	United States

The men's 100 metre freestyle event at the 2016 Summer Olympics took place in Rio de Janeiro between 9–10 August at the Olympic Aquatics Stadium.

== Summary ==
At 18 years of age, Kyle Chalmers defeated the experienced field of sprinters to become Australia's first Olympic champion in this event since Michael Wenden topped the podium in 1968. Rallying from seventh at the halfway turn, he overhauled the field for the gold medal and a junior world record in 47.58. Swimming out of lane seven, Pieter Timmers posted a 47.80 to take home the silver for the Belgians, along with a national record. Meanwhile, U.S. sprinter and defending champion Nathan Adrian barely advanced out of the prelims earlier, but bounced back to earn a bronze in the final with a 47.85.

Leading the race early on the initial length, Canada's Santo Condorelli narrowly slipped out of the podium to fourth in 47.88, just a 0.03-second deficit behind Adrian. British teenager Duncan Scott finished fifth in 48.01 to match his own national record that he set in the heats. American youngster Caeleb Dressel picked up a sixth spot in 48.02, while Australia's pre-race favorite Cameron McEvoy dropped back to seventh in 48.12. Amid the delight of the home crowd, Brazil's Marcelo Chierighini rounded out the field with an eighth-place time in 48.42.

Notable swimmers missed the final roster, including China's Ning Zetao, the defending World champion, and Russia's Vladimir Morozov, who was allowed to compete in Rio, after filing a successful appeal against his possible doping report ban.

== Qualification ==
Each National Olympic Committee (NOC) could enter up to two swimmers if both met the Olympic Qualifying Time (or "OQT"). An NOC with no swimmers meeting the OQT but at least one swimmer meeting the Olympic Selection Time (or "OST") was not guaranteed a place, but was eligible for selection to fill the overall 900 swimmer quota for the Games. For 2016, the OQT was 48.99 seconds while the OST was 50.70 seconds. The qualifying window was 1 March 2015 to 3 July 2016; only approved meets (generally international competitions and national Olympic trials) during that period could be used to meet the standards. There were also universality places available; if no male swimmer from a nation qualified in any event, the NOC could enter one male swimmer in an event.

The two swimmers per NOC limit had been in place since the 1984 Games.

== Records ==
Prior to this competition, the existing world and Olympic records were as follows.

World record	César Cielo (BRA)	46.91	Rome, Italy	30 July 2009
Olympic record	Eamon Sullivan (AUS)	47.05	Beijing, China	13 August 2008

== Competition format ==
The competition consisted of three rounds: heats, semifinals, and a final. The swimmers with the best 16 times in the heats advanced to the semifinals. The swimmers with the best 8 times in the semifinals advanced to the final. Swim-offs were used as necessary to break ties for advancement to the next round.

== Schedule ==
All times are Brasilia Time (UTC-3)

Date	Time	Round
Tuesday, 9 August 2016	13:02; 22:03	Heats; Semifinals
Wednesday, 10 August 2016	23:03	Final

== Results ==
=== Heats ===
Rank	Heat	Lane	Name	Nation	Time	Notes
1	7	3	Kyle Chalmers	Australia	47.90	Q, WJ
2	7	2	Caeleb Dressel	United States	47.91	Q
3	5	6	Duncan Scott	Great Britain	48.01	Q, NR
4	8	4	Cameron McEvoy	Australia	48.12	Q
5	6	5	Santo Condorelli	Canada	48.22	Q
6	6	8	Joseph Schooling	Singapore	48.27	Q, NR
7	8	8	Damian Wierling	Germany	48.35	Q
8	6	3	Vladimir Morozov	Russia	48.39	Q
9	8	2	Pieter Timmers	Belgium	48.46	Q
10	8	5	Luca Dotto	Italy	48.47	Q
11	7	8	Yuri Kisil	Canada	48.49	Q
12	6	2	Sebastiaan Verschuren	Netherlands	48.51	Q
13	6	6	Marcelo Chierighini	Brazil	48.53	Q
14	6	4	Ning Zetao	China	48.57	Q
14	8	3	Clément Mignon	France	48.57	Q
16	7	4	Nathan Adrian	United States	48.58	Q
17	6	1	Katsumi Nakamura	Japan	48.61	
18	7	5	Jérémy Stravius	France	48.62	
19	5	5	Glenn Surgeloose	Belgium	48.65	
20	5	1	Kristian Golomeev	Greece	48.68	
21	7	6	Andrey Grechin	Russia	48.75	
22	8	6	Federico Grabich	Argentina	48.78	
23	4	2	Dylan Carter	Trinidad and Tobago	48.80	NR
24	4	6	Richárd Bohus	Hungary	48.86	
25	6	7	Yu Hexin	China	48.87	
26	4	4	Dominik Kozma	Hungary	48.92	
27	7	7	Shinri Shioura	Japan	48.94	
28	8	7	Nicolas Oliveira	Brazil	49.05	
29	7	1	Benjamin Proud	Great Britain	49.14	
30	5	4	Simonas Bilis	Lithuania	49.16	
31	3	4	Oussama Sahnoune	Algeria	49.20	
32	4	3	Park Tae-hwan	South Korea	49.24	
32	8	1	Velimir Stjepanović	Serbia	49.24	
34	4	1	Cristian Quintero	Venezuela	49.25	
35	4	5	Yauhen Tsurkin	Belarus	49.37	
36	5	8	Anže Tavčar	Slovenia	49.38	
37	5	7	Filippo Magnini	Italy	49.40	
38	5	2	Marius Radu	Romania	49.57	
39	5	3	Björn Hornikel	Germany	49.62	
40	3	2	Shane Ryan	Ireland	49.82	
41	3	3	Aleksandar Nikolov	Bulgaria	50.08	
42	4	7	Ari-Pekka Liukkonen	Finland	50.14	
42	4	8	Matthew Stanley	New Zealand	50.14	
44	3	5	Benjamin Hockin	Paraguay	50.26	
45	2	6	Igor Mogne	Mozambique	50.65	NR
45	3	6	Ziv Kalontarov	Israel	50.65	
47	3	8	Raphaël Stacchiotti	Luxembourg	50.79	
48	2	5	Sean Gunn	Zimbabwe	50.87	
49	3	7	Bradley Vincent	Mauritius	50.89	
50	2	4	Matthew Abeysinghe	Sri Lanka	50.96	
51	2	3	Andrew Chetcuti	Malta	51.37	
52	1	4	Jhonny Pérez	Dominican Republic	51.50	
53	3	1	Nicholas Magana	Peru	51.53	
54	1	3	Thibaut Amani Danho	Ivory Coast	52.78	
55	2	2	Miguel Mena	Nicaragua	53.40	
56	2	1	Rami Anis	Refugee Olympic Team	54.35	
57	2	7	Sovijja Pou	Cambodia	54.55	
58	2	8	Sirish Gurung	Nepal	57.76	NR
59	1	5	Robel Kiros Habte	Ethiopia	1:04.95	

=== Semifinals ===
Rank	Heat	Lane	Name	Nation	Time	Notes
1	1	8	Nathan Adrian	United States	47.83	Q
2	2	4	Kyle Chalmers	Australia	47.88	Q, WJ
3	2	3	Santo Condorelli	Canada	47.93	Q
3	1	5	Cameron McEvoy	Australia	47.93	Q
5	1	4	Caeleb Dressel	United States	47.97	Q
6	2	2	Pieter Timmers	Belgium	48.14	Q, NR
7	2	5	Duncan Scott	Great Britain	48.20	Q
8	2	1	Marcelo Chierighini	Brazil	48.23	Q
9	1	6	Vladimir Morozov	Russia	48.26	
10	2	7	Yuri Kisil	Canada	48.28	
10	1	7	Sebastiaan Verschuren	Netherlands	48.28	
12	1	1	Ning Zetao	China	48.37	
13	1	2	Luca Dotto	Italy	48.49	
14	2	8	Clément Mignon	France	48.57	
15	2	6	Damian Wierling	Germany	48.66	
16	1	3	Joseph Schooling	Singapore	48.70	

=== Final ===
Rank	Lane	Name	Nation	Time	Notes
1st place, gold medalist(s)	5	Kyle Chalmers	Australia	47.58	WJ
2nd place, silver medalist(s)	7	Pieter Timmers	Belgium	47.80	NR
3rd place, bronze medalist(s)	4	Nathan Adrian	United States	47.85	
4	6	Santo Condorelli	Canada	47.88	
5	1	Duncan Scott	Great Britain	48.01	NR
6	2	Caeleb Dressel	United States	48.02	
7	3	Cameron McEvoy	Australia	48.12	
8	8	Marcelo Chierighini	Brazil	48.41	
