= List of Belgian records in swimming =

The Belgian Records in Swimming are the fastest times ever swum by a Belgian swimmer. These records are kept by the Royal Belgium Swimming Federation ((Flemish) Koninklijke Belgische Zwembond (KBZB), (in French) Fédération Royale Belge de Natation (FRBN)).

The federation keeps records for both males and females, for long course (50m) and short course (25m) competition. Records are kept in the following events:

- freestyle: 50, 100, 200, 400, 800 and 1500;
- backstroke: 50, 100 and 200;
- breaststroke: 50, 100 and 200;
- butterfly: 50, 100 and 200;
- individual medley: 100 (25m only), 200 and 400;
- relays: 4x50 free (25m only), 4x100 free, 4x200 free, 4x50 medley (25m only) and 4x100 medley.

== Long course (50m) ==
=== Men ===
Event	Time		Name	Club	Date	Meet	Location	Ref
50 m freestyle	22.10	h	Vincent Van Hooydonck	Belgium	1 August 2026	European Championships	Paris, France	
100 m freestyle	47.80		Pieter Timmers	Belgium	10 August 2016	Olympic Games	Rio de Janeiro, Brazil	
200 m freestyle	1:45.72	sf	Lucas Henveaux	Belgium	13 August 2026	European Championships	Paris, France	
400 m freestyle	3:44.61	=	Lucas Henveaux	Belgium	11 February 2024	World Championships	Doha, Qatar	
400 m freestyle	3:44.61	=	Lucas Henveaux	California Aquatics	9 April 2026	Swim Open Stockholm	Stockholm, Sweden	
800 m freestyle	7:51.51	h	Lucas Henveaux	Belgium	29 July 2024	Olympic Games	Paris, France	
1500 m freestyle	15:11.04	h	Tom Vangeneugden	Belgium	15 August 2008	Olympic Games	Beijing, China	
50m backstroke	24.98		Noah Verreth	Vzf	15 March 2026	Lausanne Cup	Lausanne, Switzerland	
100m backstroke	53.62		Noah Verreth	Meetjesland-Gent Alliantie Zwemteam	22 March 2026	Flanders Cup	Antwerp, Belgium	
200m backstroke	1:59.64	h	Stefaan Maene	Belgium	28 July 1992	Olympic Games	Barcelona, Spain	
50m breaststroke	27.64		Basten Caerts	De Beringse Tuimelaars	10 May 2018	Belgian Championships	Ghent, Belgium	
100m breaststroke	1:00.60	h	Frédérik Deburghgraeve	Belgium	20 July 1996	Olympic Games	Atlanta, United States	
200m breaststroke	2:10.83		Noah De Schryver	Koninklijke Zwemclub Neptunus	23 April 2023	Belgian Championships	Antwerp, Belgium	
50m butterfly	23.34	sf	François Heersbrandt	Belgium	2 August 2015	World Championships	Kazan, Russia	
100m butterfly	52.00	h	Louis Croenen	Belgium	9 April 2021	Eindhoven Qualification Meet	Eindhoven, Netherlands	
200m butterfly	1:55.39		Louis Croenen	Belgium	5 August 2015	World Championships	Kazan, Russia	
200m individual medley	1:57.60	tt	Lucas Henveaux	Liege Natation	25 April 2025	Belgian Championships	Antwerp, Belgium	
400m individual medley	4:16.71	h	Ward Bauwens	Belgium	28 July 2012	Olympic Games	London, Great Britain	
4×100m freestyle relay	3:13.57		Glenn Surgeloose (48.73); Jasper Aerents (48.47); Emmanuel Vanluchene (48.82); Pieter Timmers (47.55)	Belgium	7 August 2016	Olympic Games	Rio de Janeiro, Brazil	
4×200m freestyle relay	7:08.28		Louis Croenen (1:48.47); Glenn Surgeloose (1:46.12); Dieter Dekoninck (1:47.70); Pieter Timmers (1:45.99)	Belgium	21 May 2016	European Championships	London, Great Britain	
4×100m medley relay	3:40.46	h	Nils Van Audekerke (56.96); Jonas Coreelman (1:02.05); Louis Croenen (52.93); Pieter Timmers (48.52)	Belgium	22 May 2016	European Championships	London, Great Britain	

Legend: # – Record awaiting ratification by Belgian Swimming Federation; WR – World record; ER – European record; e – equalled existing record;
Records not set in finals: h – heat; sf – semifinal; r – relay 1st leg; rh – relay heat 1st leg; b – B final; † – en route to final mark; so – swim-off; tt – time trial

=== Women ===
Event	Time		Name	Club	Date	Meet	Location	Ref
50 m freestyle	24.42		Florine Gaspard	Belgium	14 April 2025	Swim Open Stockholm	Stockholm, Sweden	
100 m freestyle	53.62		Roos Vanotterdijk	Zwemvereniging De Meerkoet Bre	9 February 2025	Flanders Cup	Antwerp, Belgium	
200 m freestyle	1:56.52	sf	Sarah Dumont	Belgium	12 August 2026	European Championships	Paris, France	
400 m freestyle	4:06.27		Valentine Dumont	Belgium	25 June 2023	Sette Colli Trophy	Rome, Italy	
800 m freestyle	8:30.44		Sarah Dumont	Belgium	27 June 2026	Sette Colli Trophy	Rome, Italy	
1500 m freestyle	16:22.18		Alisée Pisane	Belgium	12 March 2023	Edinburgh International	Edinburgh, Great Britain	
50m backstroke	27.67	sf	Roos Vanotterdijk	Belgium	30 July 2025	World Championships	Singapore, Singapore	
100m backstroke	58.97		Roos Vanotterdijk	Zwemvereniging De Meerkoet Bre	8 February 2025	Flanders Cup	Antwerp, Belgium	
200m backstroke	2:11.82		Kimberly Buys	Brabo Antwerpen	23 January 2011	Diamond Swimming Race	Antwerp, Belgium	
50 m breaststroke	30.26		Florine Gaspard	Club De Natation Bastogne	15 May 2026	Belgian Championships	Antwerp, Belgium	
100m breaststroke	1:06.89	h	Florine Gaspard	Belgium	28 July 2025	World Championships	Singapore, Singapore	
200m breaststroke	2:23.30		Fanny Lecluyse	Belgium	27 June 2021	Sette Colli Trophy	Rome, Italy	
50m butterfly	25.12		Roos Vanotterdijk	Belgium	12 August 2026	European Championships	Paris, France	
100m butterfly	55.84		Roos Vanotterdijk	Belgium	28 July 2025	World Championships	Singapore, Singapore	
200m butterfly	2:09.64		Sarah Dumont	Belgium	6 July 2024	European Junior Championships	Vilnius, Lithuania	
200m individual medley	2:09.73		Roos Vanotterdijk	Belgium	14 June 2025	French Championships	Montpellier, France	
400m individual medley	4:42.44		Sarah Dumont	Belgium	2 July 2024	European Junior Championships	Vilnius, Lithuania	
4×100m freestyle relay	3:43.11		Valentine Dumont (55.50); Juliette Dumont (54.90); Lotte Goris (56.60); Lana Ravelingien (56.11)	Belgium	19 January 2020	Flanders Cup	Antwerp, Belgium	
4×200m freestyle relay	8:01.73	h	Valentine Dumont (1:58.90); Kimberly Buys (2:01.78); Lana Ravelingien (2:00.84); Lotte Goris (2:00.21)	Belgium	21 May 2021	European Championships	Budapest, Hungary	
4×100m medley relay	4:04.54	h	Roos Vanotterdijk (1:00.91); Florine Gaspard (1:09.14); Valentine Dumont (59.09); Fleur Verdonck (55.40)	Belgium	30 July 2023	World Championships	Fukuoka, Japan	

Legend: # – Record awaiting ratification by Belgian Swimming Federation; WR – World record; ER – European record; e – equalled existing record;
Records not set in finals: h – heat; sf – semifinal; r – relay 1st leg; rh – relay heat 1st leg; b – B final; † – en route to final mark; so – swim-off; tt – time trial

=== Mixed relay ===
Event	Time		Name	Club	Date	Meet	Location	Ref
4×100 m freestyle relay	3:31.76	h, standard time to beat	Jasper Aerents (49.89); Emmanuel Vanluchene (49.34); Juliette Dumont (56.64); Goris Lotte (55.89)	Belgium	8 August 2018	European Championships	Glasgow, Great Britain	
4×200 m freestyle relay	8:13.87		L. Ravelingien; J. Desmedt; C. Feyen; N. Martens	Brabo Antwerpen	3 April 2022	-	Antwerpen, Belgium	
4×100 m medley relay	3:51.22	h, standard time to beat	Emmanuel Vanluchene (56.32); Basten Caerts (1:00.32); Kimberly Buys (58.39); Juliette Dumont (56.19)	Belgium	6 August 2018	European Championships	Glasgow, Great Britain	

Legend: # – Record awaiting ratification by Belgian Swimming Federation; WR – World record; ER – European record; e – equalled existing record;
Records not set in finals: h – heat; sf – semifinal; r – relay 1st leg; rh – relay heat 1st leg; b – B final; † – en route to final mark; so – swim-off; tt – time trial

== Short course (25m) ==
=== Men ===
Event	Time		Name	Club	Date	Meet	Location	Ref
50m freestyle	21.22	sf	Pieter Timmers	Belgium	6 December 2019	European Championships	Glasgow, Great Britain	
100m freestyle	46.54		Pieter Timmers	Belgium	17 December 2017	European Championships	Copenhagen, Denmark	
200m freestyle	1:41.13		Lucas Henveaux	Belgium	15 December 2024	World Championships	Budapest, Hungary	
400m freestyle	3:36.01		Lucas Henveaux	Belgium	16 October 2026	World Cup	Astana, Kazakhstan	
800m freestyle	7:28.03		Lucas Henveaux	Belgium	6 December 2025	European Championships	Lublin, Poland	
1500m freestyle	14:33.14		Lucas Henveaux	Belgium	15 October 2026	World Cup	Astana, Kazakhstan	
50m backstroke	23.25		Noah Verreth	Mega	7 November 2026	Flanders Championships	Mol, Belgium	
100m backstroke	50.23	h	Noah Verreth	Zwemfed	23 October 2026	Dutch Qualifiers	Rotterdam, Netherlands	
200m backstroke	1:53.14		Noah Verreth	Mega	6 November 2026	Flanders Championships	Mol, Belgium	
50m breaststroke	26.73	h	Basten Caerts	Belgium	11 August 2017	World Cup	Eindhoven, Netherlands	
100m breaststroke	57.71		Basten Caerts	Belgium	3 August 2017	World Cup	Moscow, Russia	
200m breaststroke	2:04.51		Noah De Schryver	Koninklijke Zwemclub Neptunus	9 November 2025	Belgian Championships	Ghent, Belgium	
50m butterfly	22.59	sf	François Heersbrandt	Belgium	5 December 2014	World Championships	Doha, Qatar	
100m butterfly	50.44		François Heersbrandt	Belgium	9 December 2011	European Championships	Szczecin, Poland	
200m butterfly	1:52.84	h	Louis Croenen	Belgium	16 December 2021	World Championships	Abu Dhabi, United Arab Emirates	
100m individual medley	52.59		Emmanuel Vanluchene	Belgium	11 December 2015	Scottish Championships	Edinburgh, Great Britain	
200m individual medley	1:55.17		Emmanuel Vanluchene	Belgium	12 December 2015	Scottish Championships	Edinburgh, Great Britain	
400m individual medley	4:03.89		Lucas Henveaux	Belgium	7 December 2025	European Championships	Lublin, Poland	
4×50m freestyle relay	1:24.72		François Heersbrandt (21.26); Jasper Aerents (21.12); Emmanuel Vanluchene (21.35); Glenn Surgeloose (20.99)	Belgium	6 December 2014	World Championships	Doha, Qatar	
4×100m freestyle relay	3:07.54		Jasper Aerents (47.59); Pieter Timmers (46.08); Emmanuel Vanluchene (46.60); Glenn Surgeloose (47.27)	Belgium	3 December 2014	World Championships	Doha, Qatar	
4×200m freestyle relay	6:52.66		Louis Croenen (1:44.91); Glenn Surgeloose (1:43.29); Emmanuel Vanluchene (1:42.33); Pieter Timmers (1:42.13)	Belgium	4 December 2014	World Championships	Doha, Qatar	
4×50m medley relay	1:35.70		Emmanuel Vanluchene (24.46); Jonas Coreelman (27.57); Francois Heersbrandt (22.46); Jasper Aerents (21.21)	Belgium	8 December 2011	European Championships	Szczecin, Poland	
4×100m medley relay	3:39.25		Dieter Dekoninck; Nick Verscheure; Gino Stevenheydens; Wim Goris	BRABO	4 August 2009	-	Leuven, Belgium	

Legend: # – Record awaiting ratification by Belgian Swimming Federation; WR – World record; ER – European record; e – equalled existing record;
Records not set in finals: h – heat; sf – semifinal; r – relay 1st leg; rh – relay heat 1st leg; b – B final; † – en route to final mark; so – swim-off; tt – time trial

=== Women ===
Event	Time		Name	Club	Date	Meet	Location	Ref
50 m freestyle	23.80		Florine Gaspard	Club De Natation Bastogne	7 November 2025	Belgian Championships	Ghent, Belgium	
100 m freestyle	52.57		Florine Gaspard	Club De Natation Bastogne	9 November 2025	Belgian Championships	Ghent, Belgium	
200 m freestyle	1:53.65		Roos Vanotterdijk	Zwemvereniging De Meerkoet Bre	6 November 2026	Flanders Championships	Mol, Belgium	
400 m freestyle	4:00.05		Valentine Dumont	Aqua Centurions	9 November 2020	International Swimming League	Budapest, Hungary	
800 m freestyle	8:20.84		Alisée Pisane	AAS Sarcelles Natation 95	5 November 2022	French Championships	Chartres, France	
1500 m freestyle	15:55.33		Alisée Pisane	Belgium	8 December 2023	European Championships	Otopeni, Romania	
50m backstroke	26.31		Roos Vanotterdijk	Belgium	8 October 2026	World Cup	Tashkent, Uzbekistan	
100m backstroke	56.78		Roos Vanotterdijk	Zwemvereniging De Meerkoet Bree	10 November 2024	Belgian Championships	Ghent, Belgium	
200m backstroke	2:06.29		Kimberly Buys	Zwemclub Brabo Antwerpen	30 January 2010	International Meet	Uster, Switzerland	
50m breaststroke	29.33		Florine Gaspard	Club De Natation Bastogne	9 November 2025	Belgian Championships	Ghent, Belgium	
100m breaststroke	1:03.61	sf	Florine Gaspard	Belgium	2 December 2025	European Championships	Lublin, Poland	
200m breaststroke	2:18.07		Roos Vanotterdijk	Zwemvereniging De Meerkoet Bree	7 November 2025	Belgian Championships	Ghent, Belgium	
50m butterfly	24.56		Roos Vanotterdijk	Belgium	15 October 2026	World Cup	Astana, Kazakhstan	
100 m butterfly	54.80		Roos Vanotterdijk	Belgium	16 October 2026	World Cup	Astana, Kazakhstan	
200m butterfly	2:07.96		Valentine Dumont	LA Current	21 November 2021	International Swimming League	Eindhoven, Netherlands	
100m individual medley	56.68		Roos Vanotterdijk	Belgium	8 October 2026	World Cup	Tashkent, Uzbekistan	
200m individual medley	2:05.07		Roos Vanotterdijk	Belgium	17 October 2026	World Cup	Astana, Kazakhstan	
400m individual medley	4:35.89		Fanny Lecluyse	Royal Dauphins Mouscronnois	5 November 2017	Nordsjøstevnet	Kristiansand, Norway	
4×50m freestyle relay	1:40.60		Annelies De Mare (25.44); Ni Van Koeckhoven (25.10); Sarah Wegria (25.22); Jolien Sysmans (24.84)	Belgium	12 December 2008	European Championships	Rijeka, Croatia	
4×100m freestyle relay	3:45.99		Emily Vavourakis; Kimberly Buys; Kim Caluwaerts; Tine Bossuyt	BRABO	27 December 2006	-	Leuven, Belgium	
4×200m freestyle relay	8:13.57		Kim Caluwaerts; Tine Bossuyt; Emily Vavourakis; Kimberly Buys	BRABO	27 December 2006	-	Leuven, Belgium	
4×50m medley relay	1:48.44		Jasmjin Verhaegen (27.67); Kim Janssens (30.84); Kimberly Buys (25.73); Jolien Sysmans (24.20)	Belgium	25 November 2012	European Championships	Chartres, France	
4×100m medley relay	4:09.22		Lynn Caluwaerts (1:04.03); Elise Matthysen; Kimberly Buys; Emily Vavourakis	BRABO	8 August 2008	-	Berchem, Belgium	

Legend: # – Record awaiting ratification by Belgian Swimming Federation; WR – World record; ER – European record; e – equalled existing record;
Records not set in finals: h – heat; sf – semifinal; r – relay 1st leg; rh – relay heat 1st leg; b – B final; † – en route to final mark; so – swim-off; tt – time trial

=== Mixed relay ===
Event	Time	Name	Club	Date	Meet	Location	Ref
4×50 m freestyle relay	1:35.47	Dries Vangoetsenhoven (22.93); Sebastien De Meulemeester (22.18); Kimberly Buys (25.20); Lotte Goris (25.16)	Zwemclub Brabo Antwerpen	11 November 2018	Belgian Championships	Ghent, Belgium	
4×50 m medley relay	1:43.95	Jade Smits (28.06); Fleur Vermeiren (30.00); Jesse De Smedt (23.76); Elias Meeus (22.13)	Brabo Antwerpen	2 July 2022	Speedo Fast Water Meet	Amsterdam, Netherlands	

Legend: # – Record awaiting ratification by Belgian Swimming Federation; WR – World record; ER – European record; e – equalled existing record;
Records not set in finals: h – heat; sf – semifinal; r – relay 1st leg; rh – relay heat 1st leg; b – B final; † – en route to final mark; so – swim-off; tt – time trial
