= Swimming at the 2012 Summer Olympics – Men's 200 metre freestyle =

Men's 200 metre freestyle at the Games of the XXX Olympiad
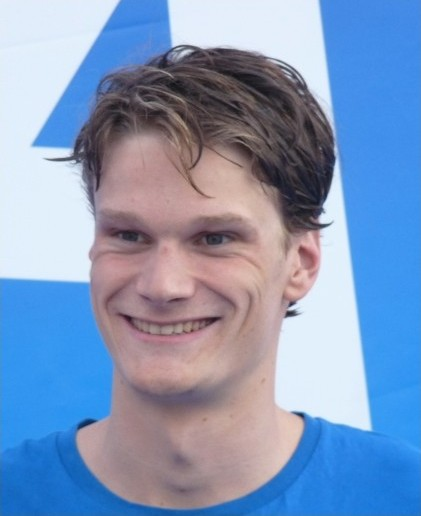
- Gold medalist Yannick Agnel
- Venue: London Aquatics Centre
- Dates: July 29, 2012 (heats & semifinals); July 30, 2012 (final)
- Competitors: 40 from 31 nations
- Winning time: 1:43.14

Medalists
1st place, gold medalist(s)		Yannick Agnel	France
2nd place, silver medalist(s)		Sun Yang	China
2nd place, silver medalist(s)		Park Tae-Hwan	South Korea

The men's 200 metre freestyle event at the 2012 Summer Olympics took place on 29–30 July at the London Aquatics Centre in London, United Kingdom. There were 40 competitors from 31 nations.

After overhauling the Americans in the 4 × 100 freestyle relay with a stunning anchor leg, France's Yannick Agnel pulled away from a star-studded field by over a full body length to earn his second Olympic gold in swimming at these Games. Billed as the "Race of the Century", he came up again with a spectacular swim on the final stretch to hit the wall first in 1:43.14, posting a textile best in the process and moving rapidly to third in the world's all time rankings. Meanwhile, South Korea's Park Tae-Hwan and China's Sun Yang tied for the silver medal in a matching time of 1:44.93, following a dramatic rivalry in the 400 m freestyle final two days earlier. Agnel's gold was France's first medal in the men's 200 metre freestyle, with Sun's silver the first for China. Park was the fifth man to win multiple medals in the event, adding to his 2008 silver.

U.S. swimmer Ryan Lochte, the reigning world champion, missed the podium by 11-hundredths of a second with a fourth-place time in 1:45.04. Germany's world-record holder Paul Biedermann faded down the stretch to pick up a fifth spot in 1:45.53, edging out British home favorite Robbie Renwick by a full body length with a highly-creditable, sixth-place effort (1:46.53). Australia's Thomas Fraser-Holmes (1:46.93) and Russia's Danila Izotov (1:47.75) also vied for an Olympic medal to round out the stellar championship field.

Notable swimmers missed out the final roster featuring Lochte's teammate Ricky Berens, who replaced Michael Phelps to fill out the slot for the Americans but placed ninth (1:46.87); and Switzerland's Dominik Meichtry, a sixth-place finalist in Beijing four years earlier, who finished fifteenth in the semifinals (1:48.25).

== Background ==
This was the 14th appearance of the 200 metre freestyle event. It was first contested in 1900. It would be contested a second time, though at 220 yards, in 1904. After that, the event did not return until 1968; since then, it has been on the programme at every Summer Games.

Four of the 8 finalists from the 2008 Games returned: silver medalist Park Tae-Hwan of South Korea, fifth-place finisher Paul Biedermann of Germany, sixth-place finisher Dominik Meichtry of Switzerland, and eighth-place finisher Robbie Renwick of Great Britain. Reigning gold medalist Michael Phelps qualified but elected not to compete in eight events again, dropping this event. Biedermann had won the 2009 World Championship and taken bronze in 2011. American Ryan Lochte was the reigning World Champion. Phelps had placed second both times. Lochte was the favourite without Phelps competing, though Park, Sun Yang of China (the 400 metres champion in London), and Yannick Agnel of France were serious contenders.

Brunei, the Dominican Republic, and Paraguay each made their debut in the event. Australia made its 14th appearance, the only nation to have competed in all prior editions of the event.

== Qualification ==
Each National Olympic Committee (NOC) could enter up to two swimmers if both met the Olympic Qualifying Time (or "OQT"). An NOC with no swimmers meeting the OQT but at least one swimmer meeting the Olympic Selection Time (or "OST") was not guaranteed a place, but was eligible for selection to fill the overall 900 swimmer quota for the Games. For 2012, the OQT was 1:47.82 while the OST was 1:51.59. The qualifying window was 1 March 2011 to 3 July 2012; only approved meets (generally international competitions and national Olympic trials) during that period could be used to meet the standards. There were also universality places available; if no male swimmer from a nation qualified in any event, the NOC could enter one male swimmer in an event.

Nine nations (Australia, the Cayman Islands, China, France, Great Britain, Germany, the Netherlands, Russia, and the United States) had two swimmers meet the OQT. Five more (Hungary, New Zealand, Paraguay, South Korea, and Switzerland) had one swimmer qualify through the OQT. 12 NOCs received a place through OST selection. 6 nations used universality places in the men's 200 metre freestyle.

The two swimmers per NOC limit had been in place since the 1984 Games.

== Competition format ==
The competition followed the format established in 2000, with three rounds: heats, semifinals, and a final. The advancement rule followed the format introduced in 1952. A swimmer's place in the heat was not used to determine advancement; instead, the fastest times from across all heats in a round were used. The top 16 swimmers from the heats advanced to the semifinals. The top 8 semifinalists advanced to the final. Swim-offs were used as necessary to break ties.

This swimming event used freestyle swimming, which means that the method of the stroke is not regulated (unlike backstroke, breaststroke, and butterfly events). Nearly all swimmers use the front crawl or a variant of that stroke. Because an Olympic-size swimming pool is 50 metres long, this race consisted of four lengths of the pool.

== Records ==
Prior to this competition, the existing world and Olympic records were as follows.

World record	Paul Biedermann (GER)	1:42.00	Rome, Italy	28 July 2009
Olympic record	Michael Phelps (USA)	1:42.96	Beijing, China	12 August 2008

== Schedule ==
The competition returned to a two-day schedule, with heats and semifinals on the same day.

All times are British Summer Time (UTC+1)

Date	Time	Round
Sunday, 29 July 2012	10:20; 19:37	Heats; Semifinals
Monday, 30 July 2012	19:43	Final

== Results ==
=== Heats ===
The top 16 advanced to the semifinals.

Rank	Heat	Lane	Swimmer	Nation	Time	Notes
1	5	5	Sun Yang	China	1:46.24	Q
2	5	4	Ryan Lochte	United States	1:46.45	Q
3	6	4	Yannick Agnel	France	1:46.60	Q
4	4	5	Danila Izotov	Russia	1:46.61	Q
5	6	5	Park Tae-hwan	South Korea	1:46.79	Q
6	4	2	Robert Renwick	Great Britain	1:46.86	Q
7	6	2	Kenrick Monk	Australia	1:46.94	Q
8	5	3	Ricky Berens	United States	1:47.07	Q
9	5	7	Dominik Kozma	Hungary	1:47.18	Q
10	4	4	Paul Biedermann	Germany	1:47.27	Q
11	6	3	Sebastiaan Verschuren	Netherlands	1:47.31	Q
12	4	3	Grégory Mallet	France	1:47.39	Q
13	6	6	Thomas Fraser-Holmes	Australia	1:47.50	Q
14	5	2	Brett Fraser	Cayman Islands	1:47.74	Q
15	6	7	Artem Lobuzov	Russia	1:47.91	Q
16	4	6	Dominik Meichtry	Switzerland	1:47.97	Q
17	3	3	Blake Worsley	Canada	1:48.14	
18	6	1	Matthew Stanley	New Zealand	1:48.19	
19	4	1	Ieuan Lloyd	Great Britain	1:48.52	
20	6	8	Shaune Fraser	Cayman Islands	1:48.53	
21	3	4	Nimrod Shapira Bar-Or	Israel	1:48.60	
22	3	5	Cristian Quintero Valero	Venezuela	1:48.71	
23	5	6	Li Yunqi	China	1:48.72	
24	4	7	Clemens Rapp	Germany	1:48.75	
25	3	7	Glenn Surgeloose	Belgium	1:48.77	
26	5	8	Benjamin Hockin	Paraguay	1:48.91	
27	3	2	David Brandl	Austria	1:49.00	
27	5	1	Dion Dreesens	Netherlands	1:49.00	
29	4	8	Marco Belotti	Italy	1:49.14	
30	3	6	Ahmed Mathlouthi	Tunisia	1:49.68	
31	2	5	Matias Koski	Finland	1:49.84	
32	2	4	Radovan Siljevski	Serbia	1:51.40	
33	2	2	Mario Montoya	Costa Rica	1:51.66	
34	2	3	Sebastián Jahnsen Madico	Peru	1:52.36	
35	3	8	Tiago Venâncio	Portugal	1:52.36	
36	2	6	Jessie Lacuna	Philippines	1:52.91	
37	1	4	Nicholas Schwab	Dominican Republic	1:53.41	NR
38	2	7	Raúl Martínez Colomer	Puerto Rico	1:54.23	
39	1	5	Mathieu Marquet	Mauritius	1:58.91	
40	1	3	Anderson Lim	Brunei	2:02.26	NR
—	3	1	Mads Glæsner	Denmark	DNS	

=== Semifinals ===
Rank	Heat	Lane	Swimmer	Nation	Time	Notes
1	2	4	Sun Yang	China	1:45.61	Q
2	2	5	Yannick Agnel	France	1:45.84	Q
3	2	3	Park Tae-hwan	South Korea	1:46.02	Q
4	1	2	Paul Biedermann	Germany	1:46.10	Q
5	1	4	Ryan Lochte	United States	1:46.31	Q
6	1	3	Robbie Renwick	Great Britain	1:46.65	Q
6	1	5	Danila Izotov	Russia	1:46.65	Q
8	2	1	Thomas Fraser-Holmes	Australia	1:46.80	Q
9	1	6	Ricky Berens	United States	1:46.87	
10	2	2	Dominik Kozma	Hungary	1:46.93	
11	2	7	Sebastiaan Verschuren	Netherlands	1:46.95	
12	1	1	Brett Fraser	Cayman Islands	1:47.01	
13	2	6	Kenrick Monk	Australia	1:47.38	
14	1	7	Grégory Mallet	France	1:47.56	
15	1	8	Dominik Meichtry	Switzerland	1:48.25	
16	2	8	Artem Lobuzov	Russia	1:48.26	

=== Final ===
Rank	Lane	Swimmer	Nation	Time	Notes
1st place, gold medalist(s)	5	Yannick Agnel	France	1:43.14	NR
2nd place, silver medalist(s)	4	Sun Yang	China	1:44.93	NR
2nd place, silver medalist(s)	3	Park Tae-hwan	South Korea	1:44.93	
4	2	Ryan Lochte	United States	1:45.04	
5	6	Paul Biedermann	Germany	1:45.53	
6	1	Robbie Renwick	Great Britain	1:46.53	
7	8	Thomas Fraser-Holmes	Australia	1:46.93	
8	7	Danila Izotov	Russia	1:47.75	
