= Maarten Brzoskowski =

Dutch swimmer (born 1995)

Personal information
- National team: Netherlands
- Born: 19 September 1995 (age 30) Best, Netherlands
- Height: 185 cm (6 ft 1 in)
- Weight: 79 kg (174 lb)

Sport
- Sport: Swimming
- Strokes: Freestyle
- Club: PSV
- Coach: Marcel Wouda
Medal record
Men's swimming
Representing the Netherlands
European Championships (LC)
Gold medal – first place	2016 London	4×200 m freestyle

Maarten Brzoskowski (born 19 September 1995) is a Dutch competitive swimmer of Polish origin who specializes in freestyle. He holds the Dutch records in both the long course and short course 400 meter freestyle events.

His father's grandfather emigrated during World War I from Poland to the Netherlands.

== Career ==
Brzoskowski participated in his first international championships at the 2014 European Aquatics Championships in Berlin, swimming the 400, 800, and 1500 meter freestyle events.

He qualified for the 800 meter and 1500 meter freestyle at the 2015 World Aquatics Championships in Kazan, Russia, where he finished 16th and 15th in the heats. After the world championships, he shifted his focus from the 1500 meter to the 400 meter. Later that year, he made the finals in the 200 and 400 meter freestyle events at the 2015 European Short Course Championships in Netanya, Israel.

At the 2016 European Aquatics Championships in London, he won the gold medal in the 4 × 200 meter freestyle relay, swimming the second leg. The team, also consisting of Dion Dreesens, Kyle Stolk, and Sebastiaan Verschuren, broke the Dutch record. Individually Brzoskowski made the finals in the 200 and 400 meter freestyle events. In the latter he finished 5th, breaking the 14-year old Dutch record held by Pieter van den Hoogenband.

Brzoskowski qualified for the 2016 Summer Olympics in Rio de Janeiro. He finished 18th in the 400 meter freestyle, and 7th in the final of the 4 × 200 meter freestyle relay.

== Personal bests ==
Short course
Event	Time	Date	Location
200 m freestyle	1:43.27	2020-12-17	Amsterdam, Netherlands
400 m freestyle	3:39.91	2016-12-06	Windsor, Canada
800 m freestyle	7:45.00	2021-12-03	The Hague, Netherlands
200 m butterfly	1:52.33	2018-10-27	Aachen, Germany

Long course
Event	Time	Date	Location
200 m freestyle	1:46.62	2019-06-21	Amersfoort, Netherlands
400 m freestyle	3:47.09NR	2016-05-16	London, United Kingdom
800 m freestyle	7:54.31	2015-08-04	Kazan, Russia
200 m butterfly	1:58.84	2018-12-16	Sarcelles, France
