= 2017 European Short Course Swimming Championships =

Water sport competitions

- Host city: Copenhagen, Denmark
- Date(s): 13–17 December
- Venue(s): Royal Arena
- Events: 40

The 2017 European Short Course Swimming Championships took place in Copenhagen, Denmark, from 13 to 17 December 2017. The meet was held in the Royal Arena, which was finished in early 2017. It was the first major sports event in this arena, which has a capacity of circa 12,500.

It was the second time that Denmark hosted this event, after the 2013 edition in Herning.

== Bidding process ==
Poland and Italy were also bidding to host the championships. The decision to select Copenhagen was announced by LEN President Paolo Barelli on 9 October 2015.

== Medal summary ==
=== Medal table ===
Host nation

Rank	Nation	Gold	Silver	Bronze	Total
1	Russia (RUS)	9	5	4	18
2	Hungary (HUN)	8	3	2	13
3	Italy (ITA)	5	7	5	17
4	Netherlands (NED)	5	3	3	11
5	Germany (GER)	3	3	1	7
5	Sweden (SWE)	3	3	1	7
7	Lithuania (LTU)	3	0	1	4
8	France (FRA)	1	2	5	8
9	Ukraine (UKR)	1	2	0	3
10	Great Britain (GBR)	1	1	4	6
11	Spain (ESP)	1	0	1	2
12	Denmark (DEN)*	0	3	4	7
13	Poland (POL)	0	2	1	3
14	Finland (FIN)	0	2	0	2
14	Greece (GRE)	0	2	0	2
16	Belarus (BLR)	0	1	1	2
16	Belgium (BEL)	0	1	1	2
18	Norway (NOR)	0	0	4	4
19	Liechtenstein (LIE)	0	0	1	1
19	Romania (ROU)	0	0	1	1
19	Serbia (SRB)	0	0	1	1
Totals (21 entries)		40	40	41	121

=== Men's events ===
Event	Gold		Silver		Bronze	
50 m freestyle	Vladimir Morozov; Russia	20.31 CR, NR	Ben Proud; Great Britain	20.66 NR	Luca Dotto; Italy	20.78
100 m freestyle	Luca Dotto; Italy	46.11	Pieter Timmers; Belgium	46.54 NR	Duncan Scott; Great Britain	46.64
200 m freestyle	Danas Rapšys; Lithuania	1:40.85 NR	Aleksandr Krasnykh; Russia	1:42.22	Duncan Scott; Great Britain	1:43.07
400 m freestyle	Aleksandr Krasnykh; Russia	3:35.51	Péter Bernek; Hungary	3:35.96	Henrik Christiansen; Norway	3:38.63
1500 m freestyle	Mykhailo Romanchuk; Ukraine	14:14.59 NR	Gregorio Paltrinieri; Italy	14:22.93	Henrik Christiansen; Norway	14:25.66
50 m backstroke	Simone Sabbioni; Italy	23.05 NR	Kliment Kolesnikov; Russia	23.07 WJ	Jérémy Stravius; France	23.12
100 m backstroke	Kliment Kolesnikov; Russia	48.99 WJ	Simone Sabbioni; Italy	49.68 NR	Robert Glință; Romania	49.99 NR
200 m backstroke	Kliment Kolesnikov; Russia	1:48.02 WJ CR	Radosław Kawęcki; Poland	1:48.46	Danas Rapšys; Lithuania	1:49.06 NR
50 m breaststroke	Fabio Scozzoli; Italy	25.62 ER CR	Kirill Prigoda; Russia	25.68 NR	Adam Peaty; Great Britain	25.70 NR
100 m breaststroke	Adam Peaty; Great Britain	55.94 ER CR	Fabio Scozzoli; Italy	56.15 NR	Kirill Prigoda; Russia	56.28
200 m breaststroke	Kirill Prigoda; Russia	2:01.11 NR	Marco Koch; Germany	2:01.52	Mikhail Dorinov; Russia	2:01.85
50 m butterfly	Aleksandr Popkov; Russia	22.42	Andriy Hovorov; Ukraine	22.43	Ben Proud; Great Britain; Sebastian Sabo; Serbia	22.44
100 m butterfly	Matteo Rivolta; Italy	49.93	Piero Codia; Italy	49.96	Marius Kusch; Germany	50.01
200 m butterfly	Aleksandr Kharlanov; Russia	1:50.54	Andreas Vazaios; Greece	1:51.29	Tamás Kenderesi; Hungary	1:52.25
100 m individual medley	Marco Orsi; Italy	51.76 NR	Sergey Fesikov; Russia	51.94	Kyle Stolk; Netherlands	51.99
200 m individual medley	Philip Heintz; Germany	1:52.41	Andreas Vazaios; Greece	1:53.27 NR	Tomoe Zenimoto Hvas; Norway	1:54.16
400 m individual medley	Péter Bernek; Hungary	3:59.47	Philip Heintz; Germany	4:03.16	Gergely Gyurta; Hungary	4:03.36
4 × 50 m freestyle relay	Russia; Kliment Kolesnikov (21.24 WJ); Vladimir Morozov (20.59); Sergey Fesikov (20.49); Mikhail Vekovishchev (20.91); Sergey Fesikov; Aleksandr Popkov; Ivan Kuzmenko	1:23.23	Italy; Luca Dotto (20.92); Lorenzo Zazzeri (20.83); Alessandro Miressi (21.17); Marco Orsi (20.75); Andrea Vergani	1:23.67	Poland; Paweł Juraszek (21.20); Filip Wypych (21.13); Jakub Książek (21.33); Konrad Czerniak (20.78); Kacper Stokowski	1:24.44 NR
4 × 50 m medley relay	Russia; Kliment Kolesnikov (22.83 WJ); Kirill Prigoda (25.26); Aleksandr Popkov (22.11); Vladimir Morozov (20.24); Nikita Ulyanov; Aleksandr Sadovnikov; Mikhail Vekovishchev	1:30.44 WR	Italy; Simone Sabbioni (23.14); Fabio Scozzoli (25.45); Piero Codia (22.72); Luca Dotto (20.60); Niccolò Bonacchi; Nicolò Martinenghi; Alessandro Miressi	1:31.91	Belarus; Pavel Sankovich (23.16); Ilya Shymanovich (25.48); Yauhen Tsurkin (22.23); Anton Latkin (21.19)	1:32.06

Legend: WR - World record; WBT - World best time; ER - European record; NR - National record; CR - Championship record; WJ - Junior world record

=== Women's events ===
Event	Gold		Silver		Bronze	
50 m freestyle	Sarah Sjöström; Sweden	23.30 CR	Ranomi Kromowidjojo; Netherlands	23.31	Pernille Blume; Denmark	23.49 =NR
100 m freestyle	Ranomi Kromowidjojo; Netherlands	50.95 CR	Sarah Sjöström; Sweden	51.03	Pernille Blume; Denmark	51.63
200 m freestyle	Charlotte Bonnet; France	1:52.19	Femke Heemskerk; Netherlands	1:53.41	Veronika Andrusenko; Russia	1:53.75
400 m freestyle	Boglárka Kapás; Hungary	3:58.15 NR	Sarah Köhler; Germany	3:59.12 NR	Julia Hassler; Liechtenstein	4:02.43 NR
800 m freestyle	Sarah Köhler; Germany	8:10.65 NR	Boglárka Kapás; Hungary	8:11.13	Simona Quadarella; Italy	8:16.53
50 m backstroke	Katinka Hosszú; Hungary	25.95	Alicja Tchórz; Poland	26.09	Maaike de Waard; Netherlands	26.40
100 m backstroke	Katinka Hosszú; Hungary	55.66	Kira Toussaint; Netherlands	56.21 NR	Maria Kameneva; Russia	57.01
200 m backstroke	Katinka Hosszú; Hungary	2:01.59	Daryna Zevina; Ukraine	2:02.27	Margherita Panziera; Italy	2:02.43 NR
50 m breaststroke	Rūta Meilutytė; Lithuania	29.36	Jenna Laukkanen; Finland	29.54 NR	Sophie Hansson; Sweden	29.77 NR
100 m breaststroke	Rūta Meilutytė; Lithuania	1:03.79	Jenna Laukkanen; Finland	1:04.25 NR	Jessica Vall; Spain	1:04.80 NR
200 m breaststroke	Jessica Vall; Spain	2:18.41 NR	Rikke Møller Pedersen; Denmark	2:19.53	Fanny Lecluyse; Belgium	2:19.86
50 m butterfly	Ranomi Kromowidjojo; Netherlands	24.78	Emilie Beckmann; Denmark	25.16	Maaike de Waard; Netherlands	25.46
100 m butterfly	Sarah Sjöström; Sweden	55.00 CR	Marie Wattel; France	55.97	Emilie Beckmann; Denmark	56.22
200 m butterfly	Franziska Hentke; Germany	2:03.92	Ilaria Bianchi; Italy	2:04.22 NR	Lara Grangeon; France	2:04.31
100 m individual medley	Katinka Hosszú; Hungary	56.97	Sarah Sjöström; Sweden	57.92	Susann Bjørnsen; Norway	59.26
200 m individual medley	Katinka Hosszú; Hungary	2:04.43	Evelyn Verrasztó; Hungary	2:08.09	Ilaria Cusinato; Italy	2:08.19
400 m individual medley	Katinka Hosszú; Hungary	4:24.78	Lara Grangeon; France	4:28.77	Fantine Lesaffre; France	4:30.68
4 × 50 m freestyle relay	Netherlands; Ranomi Kromowidjojo (23.42); Femke Heemskerk (23.19); Tamara van Vliet (23.65); Valerie van Roon (23.65); Kim Busch; Kira Toussaint	1:33.91 WR	Sweden; Michelle Coleman (24.42); Sarah Sjöström (22.94); Louise Hansson (24.21); Nathalie Lindborg (24.35); Magdalena Kuras	1:35.92	Denmark; Emilie Beckmann (24.61); Mie Nielsen (24.10); Julie Kepp Jensen (23.89); Pernille Blume (23.42); Emily Gantriis	1:36.02
4 × 50 m medley relay	Sweden; Hanna Rosvall (26.96); Sophie Hansson (29.30); Sarah Sjöström (24.27); Michelle Coleman (23.90); Sara Junevik	1:44.43 NR	Denmark; Julie Kepp Jensen (26.97); Rikke Møller Pedersen (30.00); Emilie Beckmann (24.82); Pernille Blume (23.21); Caroline Erichsen; Mie Nielsen	1:45.00	France; Mathilde Cini (26.72); Charlotte Bonnet (30.01); Mélanie Henique (24.80); Marie Wattel (23.82); Fanny Deberghes	1:45.35 NR

Legend: WR - World record; WBT - World best time; ER - European record; NR - National record; CR - Championship record

=== Mixed events ===
Event	Gold		Silver		Bronze	
4 × 50 m mixed freestyle	Netherlands; Nyls Korstanje (21.42); Kyle Stolk (20.66); Ranomi Kromowidjojo (23.01); Femke Heemskerk (23.30); Jesse Puts; Tamara van Vliet; Valerie van Roon	1:28.39 WR	Russia; Vladimir Morozov (20.55); Sergey Fesikov (20.67); Maria Kameneva (23.82); Rozaliya Nasretdinova (23.49); Kliment Kolesnikov; Mikhail Vekovishchev	1:28.53 NR	Italy; Luca Dotto (20.87); Marco Orsi (20.74); Federica Pellegrini (24.12); Erika Ferraioli (23.65); Lorenzo Zazzeri; Andrea Vergani	1:29.38
4 × 50 m mixed medley	Netherlands; Kira Toussaint (26.13); Arno Kamminga (26.03); Joeri Verlinden (22.46); Ranomi Kromowidjojo (23.09); Timon Evenhuis; Tamara van Vliet	1:37.71 CR, NR	Belarus; Pavel Sankovich (22.89); Ilya Shymanovich (25.32); Anastasiya Shkurdai (25.28); Yuliya Khitraya (24.25)	1:37.74 NR	France; Jérémy Stravius (22.94); Theo Bussiere (26.25); Mélanie Henique (25.39); Charlotte Bonnet (23.17)	1:37.75 NR
