= Kyle Stolk =

Dutch swimmer (born 1996)

Personal information
- Full name: Kyle Stolk
- National team: Netherlands
- Born: 28 June 1996 (age 30) Edenvale, Gauteng, South Africa
- Height: 1.86 m (6 ft 1 in)
- Weight: 84 kg (185 lb)

Sport
- Sport: Swimming
- Strokes: Freestyle
- Club: PSV Eindhoven
- Coach: Marcel Wouda
Medal record
Men's swimming
Representing the Netherlands
European Championships (LC)
Gold medal – first place	2016 London	4×200 m freestyle
Silver medal – second place	2018 Glasgow	4×100 m mixed freestyle
Youth Olympic Games
Silver medal – second place	2014 Nanjing	200 m freestyle

Kyle Stolk (born 28 June 1996) is a Dutch competitive swimmer who specializes in freestyle events. He won a silver medal in the boys' 200 m freestyle at the 2014 Summer Youth Olympics in Nanjing, and finished seventh as a member of the Dutch swimming squad in the 4 × 200 m freestyle relay at the 2016 Summer Olympics in Rio de Janeiro. Stolk currently trains for the swimming league at PSV Eindhoven, under the tutelage of his coach and three-time Olympian Marcel Wouda.

Stolk launched into the global scene as a junior swimmer at the 2014 Summer Youth Olympics in Nanjing. There, he nearly charged to the front at the final stretch of the boys' 200 m freestyle, before fading to a runner-up finish in 1:48.59, trailing the Italian swimmer Nicolangelo di Fabio by a small fraction of a second.

Two years later, Stolk was selected to the Dutch swimming roster at his senior Olympic debut in Rio de Janeiro, competing only in the men's 4 × 200 m freestyle relay. He swam through the third quarter of the race with a split of 1:47.59 to deliver the Dutch foursome of Dion Dreesens, youngster Maarten Brzoskowski, and anchor Sebastiaan Verschuren a seventh-place time in 7:09.10, holding off the Belgians from the end of the final field by more than two seconds.
