= Luca Dotto =

Italian swimmer (born 1990)

Personal information
- National team: Italy
- Born: 18 April 1990 (age 36) Camposampiero, Italy
- Height: 1.92 m (6 ft 4 in)
- Weight: 80 kg (176 lb)

Sport
- Sport: Swimming
- Strokes: Freestyle
- Club: G.S. Forestale
Medal record
Event	1st	2nd	3rd
Olympic Games	0	0	0
World Championships (LC)	0	1	1
World Championships (SC)	0	1	1
European Championships (LC)	2	3	3
European Championships (SC)	3	5	4
Mediterranean Games	1	1	2
Total	6	11	11
World Championships (LC)
Silver medal – second place	2011 Shanghai	50 m freestyle
Bronze medal – third place	2015 Kazan	4×100 m freestyle
World Championships (SC)
Silver medal – second place	2012 Istanbul	4×100 m freestyle
Bronze medal – third place	2014 Doha	4×50 m freestyle
European Championships (LC)
Gold medal – first place	2014 Berlin	4×100 m mixed freestyle
Gold medal – first place	2016 London	100 m freestyle
Silver medal – second place	2016 London	4×100 m freestyle
Silver medal – second place	2016 London	4×100 m mixed freestyle
Silver medal – second place	2018 Glasgow	4×100 m freestyle
Bronze medal – third place	2014 Berlin	4×100 m freestyle
Bronze medal – third place	2016 London	4x200 m freestyle
Bronze medal – third place	2018 Glasgow	4×100 m mixed medley
European Championships (SC)
Gold medal – first place	2010 Eindhoven	4×50 m freestyle
Gold medal – first place	2011 Szczecin	4×50 m freestyle
Gold medal – first place	2017 Copenhagen	100 m freestyle
Silver medal – second place	2011 Szczecin	100 m freestyle
Silver medal – second place	2013 Herning	4×50 m freestyle
Silver medal – second place	2013 Herning	4×50 m mixed freestyle
Silver medal – second place	2017 Copenhagen	4×50 m freestyle
Silver medal – second place	2017 Copenhagen	4×50 m medley
Bronze medal – third place	2009 Istanbul	4×50 m freestyle
Bronze medal – third place	2010 Eindhoven	100 m freestyle
Bronze medal – third place	2017 Copenhagen	50 m freestyle
Bronze medal – third place	2017 Copenhagen	4x50 m mixed freestyle
Mediterranean Games
Gold medal – first place	2013 Mersin	4×100 m freestyle
Silver medal – second place	2013 Mersin	50 m freestyle
Bronze medal – third place	2013 Mersin	100 m freestyle
Bronze medal – third place	2018 Tarragona	100 m freestyle
Youth level
European Junior Championships
Gold medal – first place	2008 Belgrade	50 m freestyle
Silver medal – second place	2008 Belgrade	4×100 m freestyle
Bronze medal – third place	2007 Antwerp	50 m freestyle
Youth World Championships
Gold medal – first place	2008 Monterrey	100 m freestyle
Gold medal – first place	2008 Monterrey	4×100 m freestyle
Silver medal – second place	2008 Monterrey	50 m freestyle

Luca Dotto (born 18 April 1990) is an Italian swimmer. He held the Italian record in the 100 m freestyle with a time of 47.96 from April 21, 2016, to August 12, 2018 and was the first Italian to swim the distance in under 48 seconds. He also won the silver medal in the 50 m freestyle at the 2011 World Aquatics Championships in Shanghai.

Dotto is an athlete of the Centro Sportivo Carabinieri.

== Biography ==
He competed at the 2012 and 2016 Summer Olympics, competing in the 50 m and 100 m freestyle, and as part of the Italian men's 4 x 100 m freestyle and 4 x 100 m medley teams on both occasions.

== See also ==
- Italian swimmers multiple medalists at the international competitions
