= Kacper Klich =

Polish swimmer

Personal information
- Born: 12 November 1994 (age 31) Chorzów, Poland
- Height: 1.82 m (6 ft 0 in)
- Weight: 78 kg (172 lb)

Sport
- Sport: Swimming

Kacper Klich (born 12 November 1994) is a Polish swimmer. He competed in the men's 4 × 200 metre freestyle relay event at the 2016 Summer Olympics.
