= Lorys Bourelly =

French swimmer (born 1992)

Personal information
- Born: 27 May 1992 (age 34) Fort-de-France, Martinique

Sport
- Sport: Swimming
Medal record
Representing France
Summer Universiade
Bronze medal – third place	2011 Shenzhen	4x100m freestyle relay

Lorys Bourelly (born 27 May 1992) is a French swimmer. He competed in the men's 4 × 200 metre freestyle relay event at the 2016 Summer Olympics.
