= Anže Tavčar =

Slovenian swimmer

Personal information
- Born: 2 December 1994 (age 31) Ljubljana, Slovenia
- Height: 1.86 m (6 ft 1 in)
- Weight: 174 lb (79 kg)

Sport
- Sport: Swimming
- Strokes: Freestyle
- Club: Plavalni Klub Ljubljana
- College team: Indiana Hoosiers

Anže Tavčar (born 2 December 1994) is a Slovenian competitive swimmer, who specializes in sprint freestyle events. At the 2016 Summer Olympics he competed in the men's 100 meter freestyle and men's 200 meter freestyle. His career's most notable performance remains 100 meters freestyle at the 2016 LEN European Aquatics Championships where he, with the time of 0:48.88, became the first Slovenian swimmer as well as the first Indiana Hoosier to break the 49 second barrier.

Tavčar enrolled at the University of Louisville School of Dentistry in 2018 and is scheduled to receive his degree in May 2022.
