= Pieter Timmers =

Belgian swimmer

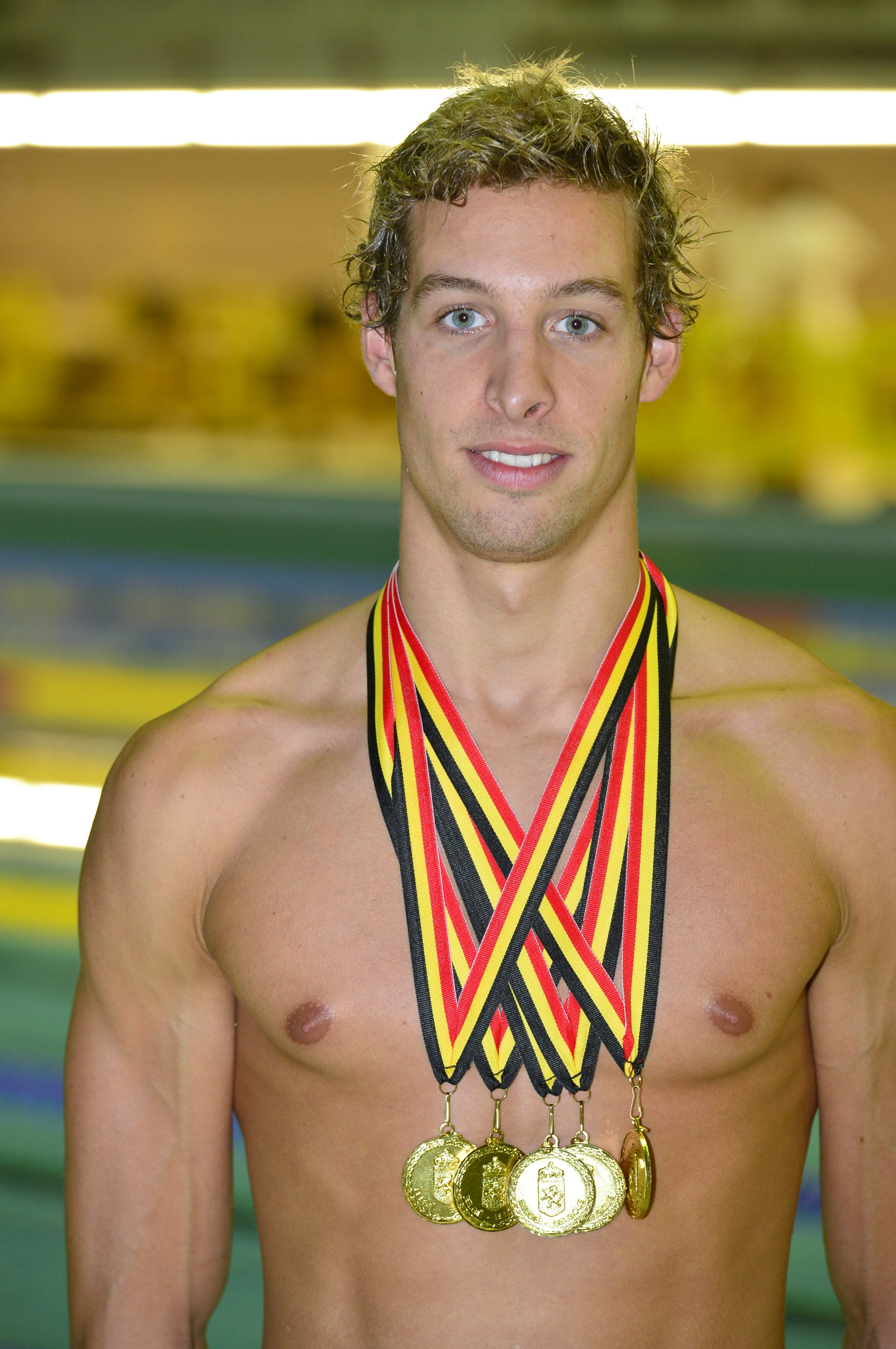

Personal information
- National team: Belgium
- Born: 21 January 1988 (age 38) Neerpelt, Belgium
- Height: 2.00 m (6 ft 7 in)
- Weight: 89 kg (196 lb)

Sport
- Sport: Swimming
- Strokes: Freestyle
- Club: Brabo Antwerp
- Coach: Ronald Gaastra
Medal record
Men's swimming
Representing Belgium
Olympic Games
Silver medal – second place	2016 Rio de Janeiro	100 m freestyle
European Championships (LC)
Silver medal – second place	2016 London	4×200 m freestyle
Bronze medal – third place	2014 Berlin	4×200 m freestyle
Bronze medal – third place	2016 London	4×100 m freestyle
European Championships (SC)
Silver medal – second place	2012 Chartres	200 m freestyle
Silver medal – second place	2015 Netanya	100 m freestyle
Silver medal – second place	2015 Netanya	200 m freestyle
Silver medal – second place	2017 Copenhagen	100 m freestyle
Bronze medal – third place	2012 Chartres	4×50 m freestyle
Bronze medal – third place	2013 Herning	4×50 m freestyle

Pieter Timmers (born 21 January 1988) is a Belgian retired competitive swimmer who specialized in sprint freestyle events. He won the silver medal in the 100 meter freestyle at the 2016 Olympics. Timmers currently holds nine Belgian records, and seven national titles in long and short course freestyle (50, 100, and 200). Timmers is a resident athlete for Brabo Antwerp, and trains under his personal coach Ronald Gaastra. He stands 2.00 m (6 ft 7 in), and weighs 89 kg (196 lb). He ended his career in Budapest in the second season of the International Swimming League in 2020.

== Career ==
Timmers qualified for three swimming events at the 2012 Summer Olympics in London, by clearing a FINA B-standard entry time of 48.92 (100 m freestyle) from the Belgian Championships in Antwerp, just a 0.10-second deficit from an A-cut and a Belgian record held by Yoris Grandjean. He also teamed up with Dieter Dekoninck, Emmanuel Vanluchene, and Jasper Aerents in the 4 × 100 m freestyle relay. Swimming the anchor leg, Timmers recorded a fastest split of 48.18, but the Belgian team rounded out the finale to last place in 3:14.40.

On the fourth day of the Games, Timmers competed in two events with 90 minutes in between. In the 100 m freestyle, he won the seventh heat, which included two-time Olympic champion Yannick Agnel of France. Swimming in lane eight, he blasted a new Belgian record of 48.54 to pick up a matching sixth seed with Cayman Islands' Brett Fraser from the preliminary heats. Followed by the evening session, Timmers fell short in his bid for the final, as he matched a twelfth-place finish with Australia's James Roberts in his semifinal run, outside a record time of 48.57. Timmers placed twelfth as a member of the Belgian team in the 4 × 200 m freestyle relay. Teaming with Dekoninck, Louis Croenen, and Glenn Surgeloose, Timmers anchored the race with a split of 1:48.28 to set a Belgian record of 7:14.44 in the heats.

At the 2012 European Short Course Swimming Championships in Chartres, France, Timmers earned his first two career medals in an international competition. In the 200 m freestyle, he touched second behind Agnel with a new short-course Belgian record of 1:43.08. Timmers also solidified his Belgian team (Vanluchene, Grandjean, and Aerents) with a bronze in the 4×50 m freestyle relay, posting a time of 1:25.60.

At the 2016 Olympics Timmers won the silver medal in the men's 100 m freestyle. He finished with a time of 47.80, breaking his own Belgian Record and was awarded with a silver medal. He also swam the 4 × 100 m relay to a 6th place in a new Belgian Record, and the Belgian team finished 8th in the 4 × 200 m freestyle relay.

=== International Swimming League ===
In 2019 Timmers was member of the 2019 International Swimming League representing Team Iron. In 2020 he joined the New York Breakers and ended his career with a 4 × 100 m freestyle mixed relay in Budapest.
