= Tom Kremer =

Game inventor and marketer (1930–2017)

Thomas Kremer (26 May 1930 – 24 June 2017) was a game inventor and marketer who acquired the rights to market the Rubik's Cube.

Tom Kremer was a games designer, entrepreneur and publisher, best known for his discovery and popularisation of the Rubik's Cube. As an octogenarian he founded the publishing house Notting Hill Editions, with the aim of reinvigorating the lost art of the essay.

== Biography ==
Kremer was born in the Székely Land region of Transylvania, Romania in 1930, the son of Lilly (née Heller) and Bundy Kremer, an army officer. As a teenager he was imprisoned at the Bergen-Belsen concentration camp, he was freed upon its liberation in April 1945. Travelling to Israel, he joined the fight for the country's independence, gained in 1948. Following studies in philosophy at the University of Edinburgh, where he met his future wife Alison Emily Balfour, he carried out post-graduate research at the Sorbonne.

Kremer had been living in England and working in games design since the 1960s when he visited a trade show in Germany and saw the Rubik's Cube for the first time in 1979. His son David recalled: "The cube wasn't a big sensation at the Nuremberg toy fair: it was just a small thing in a backwater section at this huge event." Kremer licensed the design to the Ideal Toy Company, which by 1983 had already sold some 300m of the fiendishly complicated 3D puzzle. The Cube's worldwide success came, he said, because it "challenges you with simplicity. You can handle it, and yet it has enormous hidden complexity." But it also became a victim of its own success, as his son explained: "Everybody had one. The cube went from world's greatest fad to zero: there were thousands piled up in warehouses." Kremer later reacquired the licence, allowing him to introduce it to new generations of puzzlers.

Kremer was a cofounder of Winning Moves Games and later chairman of the board, while cofounder Philip Orbanes served as president. It was while serving at Winning Moves that Kremer was able to reacquire the Rubik's Cube in 2000.

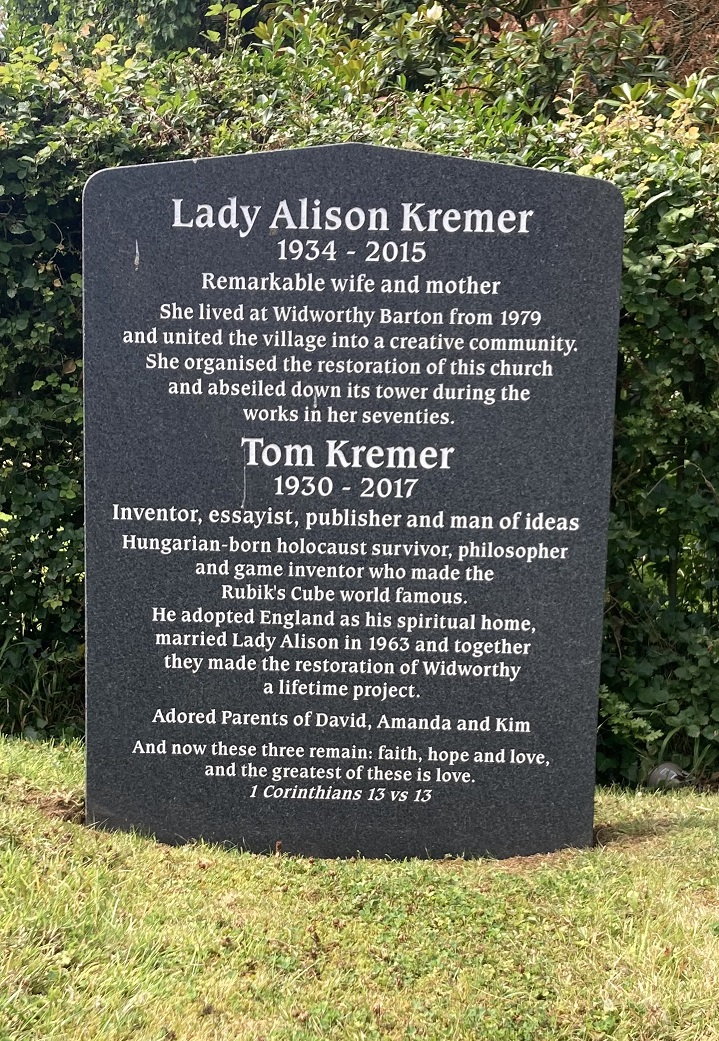
Gravestone of Lady Alison Kremer and Tom Kremer at St Cuthbert's Church, Widworthy

In 1963 Kremer married Lady Alison Balfour, daughter of Robert Balfour, 3rd Earl of Balfour; she died in 2015.
