= Alexandre Haldemann =

Swiss swimmer

Personal information
- Nationality: Swiss
- Born: 8 March 1995 (age 31) Geneva [Meyrin], Switzerland

Sport
- Sport: Swimming

Alexandre Haldemann (born 8 March 1995) is a Swiss swimmer. He competed in the men's 200 metre freestyle event at the 2016 Summer Olympics.
