= Dion Dreesens =

Dutch swimmer (born 1993)

Personal information
- National team: Netherlands
- Born: 30 April 1993 (age 33) Venray

Sport
- Sport: Swimming
- Strokes: Freestyle
Medal record
Men's swimming
Representing the Netherlands
European Championships (LC)
Gold medal – first place	2016 London	4×200 m freestyle

Dion Dreesens (born 30 April 1993) is a Dutch swimmer.

He competed at the 2012 Summer Olympics in the men's 200 metre freestyle, finishing in 27th place in the heats, failing to qualify for the semifinals.

Dreesens qualified for the 2016 Summer Olympics in Rio de Janeiro in the 200 metre freestyle and the 4 × 200 metre freestyle relay. He finished 27th in the heats of the 200 m freestyle, and finished 7th in the final with the relay.
