= Sebastiaan Verschuren =

Dutch swimmer (born 1988)

Personal information
- National team: Netherlands
- Born: 7 October 1988 (age 37) Amsterdam, Netherlands
- Height: 1.92 m (6 ft 4 in)
- Weight: 84 kg (185 lb)

Sport
- Sport: Swimming
- Strokes: Freestyle
- Club: Nationaal Zweminstituut Amsterdam
Medal record
Men's swimming
Representing the Netherlands
World Championships (LC)
Silver medal – second place	2015 Kazan	4×100 m mixed freestyle
European Championships (LC)
Gold medal – first place	2016 London	200 m freestyle
Gold medal – first place	2016 London	4×200 m freestyle
Gold medal – first place	2016 London	4×100 m mixed freestyle
Silver medal – second place	2016 London	100 m freestyle
Bronze medal – third place	2010 Budapest	200 m freestyle
Bronze medal – third place	2010 Budapest	4×100 m medley
European Championships (SC)
Bronze medal – third place	2013 Herning	4×50 m mixed freestyle

Sebastiaan Verschuren (born 7 October 1988) is a Dutch former competitive swimmer who specialized in short- and middle-distance freestyle events. At the 2016 European Aquatics Championships he won the gold medal in the 200 meter freestyle. He participated in the 2012 and 2016 Olympics, finishing 5th in the 100 meter freestyle in 2012.

== Swimming career ==
After competing in the European Junior Swimming Championships in 2005 and 2006 Verschuren made his international senior debut at the 2006 European Aquatics Championships in Budapest, Hungary with a 19th position in the 1500 m freestyle.

Two years later he participated in the 2008 European Aquatics Championships in Eindhoven in his home country, where he reached 13th place in the 200 m freestyle. In the 4 × 200 m freestyle, he finished 9th in the heats, just missing out on the final and qualification for the 2008 Summer Olympics.

At the 2012 Olympics in London, Verschuren finished 5th in the final of the 100 m freestyle. He also competed in the 200 m freestyle and the 4 × 100 m medley relay.

Verschuren qualified for the 2016 Summer Olympics in Rio de Janeiro in the 100 and 200 meter freestyle, and the 4 × 200 meter freestyle relay. In the 200 meter freestyle, he finished 11th in the semifinals.

== Personal bests ==
Short course
Event	Time	Date	Location
100 m freestyle	47.21	7 August 2013	Eindhoven, Netherlands
200 m freestyle	1:43.25	8 August 2013	Eindhoven, Netherlands
400 m freestyle	3:51.42	8 November 2014	Tilburg, Netherlands
1500 m freestyle	15:22.77	18 December 2005	Amsterdam, Netherlands

Long course
Event	Time	Date	Location
100 m freestyle	47.88	10 August 2012	London, United Kingdom
200 m freestyle	1:45.69	27 July 2009	Rome, Italy
400 m freestyle	3:48.95	7 April 2011	Eindhoven, Netherlands
800 m freestyle	8:08.90	10 June 2006	Eindhoven, Netherlands
1500 m freestyle	15:35.26	11 March 2006	Antwerp, Belgium

== See also ==
- List of Dutch records in swimming
