= Louis Croenen =

Belgian swimmer (born 1994)

Personal information
- Full name: Louis Croenen
- National team: Belgium
- Born: 4 January 1994 (age 32) Turnhout, Antwerp
- Height: 1.86 m (6 ft 1 in)
- Weight: 79 kg (174 lb)

Sport
- Sport: Swimming
- Strokes: Freestyle
Medal record
Men's swimming
Representing Belgium
European Championships (LC)
Silver medal – second place	2016 London	4×200 m freestyle
Bronze medal – third place	2014 Berlin	4×200 m freestyle
European Championships (SC)
Bronze medal – third place	2011 Szczecin	4×50 m freestyle

Louis Croenen (born 4 January 1994) is a Belgian competitive swimmer. He competed in the 4 × 200 metre freestyle relay event at the 2012 Summer Olympics. In 2016 he competed at the 2016 Summer Olympics in the men's 200 metre butterfly event and the men's 4 x 200 metre freestyle relay event.

He has qualified to represent Belgium at the 2020 Summer Olympics.
