= Glenn Surgeloose =

Belgian swimmer

Personal information
- National team: Belgium
- Born: 4 September 1989 (age 36) Ghent, Belgium
- Height: 1.82 m (6 ft 0 in)
- Weight: 82 kg (181 lb)

Sport
- Sport: Swimming
- Strokes: Freestyle, butterfly
- Club: Liege Natation
- Coach: Andre Henveaux
Medal record
European Championships (LC)
Silver medal – second place	2016 London	4x200 m freestyle
Bronze medal – third place	2014 Berlin	4x200 m freestyle
Bronze medal – third place	2016 London	4×100 m freestyle
European Championships (SC)
Bronze medal – third place	2015 Netanya	200 m freestyle
European Junior Championships
Bronze medal – third place	2007 Antwerp	200 m freestyle
Bronze medal – third place	2007 Antwerp	4x100 m freestyle

Glenn Surgeloose (born 4 September 1989) is a Belgian swimmer, who specializes in sprint freestyle events. He collected a bronze medal in the 200 m freestyle at the 2007 European Junior Swimming Championships in Antwerp, Belgium. Surgeloose is a member of Brabo Antwerp, and is coached and trained by Ronald Gaastra.

== Career ==
Surgeloose made his first Belgian team, as a 19-year-old, at the 2008 Summer Olympics in Beijing, where he qualified for the men's 200 m freestyle. He cleared a FINA B-standard entry time of 1:49.36 from the Mare Nostrum Barcelona International Trophy in Spain. He cruised to seventh place and thirtieth overall in heat five by a tenth of a second (0.10) behind Greece's Andreas Zisimos in 1:48.92.

At the 2010 European Aquatics Championships in Budapest, Hungary, Surgeloose broke a new long-course Belgian record of 1:48.29 to round out the finale in the 200 m freestyle. Surgeloose's personal best and overhauling effort in the final propelled him up to the top 25 world rankings.

At the 2012 Summer Olympics in London, Surgeloose competed in both individual and relay swimming events. A year earlier, he posted a FINA B-cut of 1:48.96 (200 m freestyle) from the World Championships in Shanghai, China. In the 200 m freestyle, Surgeloose challenged seven other swimmers on the third heat, including three-time Olympian Tiago Venâncio of Portugal and semifinalist Nimrod Shapira Bar-Or of Israel. He raced to fourth place by six hundredths of a second (0.06) behind Venezuela's Cristian Quintero in his personal textile best of 1:48.77. Surgeloose failed to advance into the semifinals, as he placed twenty-fifth overall in the preliminaries. Surgeloose also placed twelfth as a member of the Belgian team in the 4 × 200 m freestyle relay. Teaming with Pieter Timmers, Dieter Dekoninck, and Louis Croenen, Surgeloose swam the second leg with a split of 1:48.22 to set a Belgian record of 7:14.44 in the heats.

At the 2016 Summer Olympics, he competed in the 100 m and 200 m freestyle events and helped Belgium's 4 × 100 m freestyle and 4 × 200 m freestyle teams into the final of both events.
