= Swimming at the 2016 Summer Olympics – Qualification =

For the swimming competitions at the 2016 Summer Olympics, the following qualification systems were in place. Qualification ended on 3 July 2016.

== Qualifying standards ==
A National Olympic Committee (NOC) may enter a maximum of 2 qualified athletes in each individual event, only if both athletes have attained the Olympic Qualifying Time (OQT). One athlete per event can potentially enter if they meet the Olympic Selection Time (OST) or if the quota of 900 athletes has not been targeted. NOCs may also permit swimmers regardless of time (1 per gender) under a Universality place, as long as they have no swimmers meeting either of the standard entry times (OQT/OST).

In the relay events, a maximum of 16 qualifying teams in each relay event must be permitted to accumulate a total of 96 relay teams; each NOC may enter only one team. The first twelve teams in each relay event at the 2015 World Championships will automatically compete for the relay events at the Olympics; while the remaining four per relay event must obtain their fastest entry times based on the FINA World Rankings of 31 May 2016 during the process.

Following the end of the qualification period, FINA will assess the number of athletes having achieved the OQT, the number of relay-only swimmers, and the number of Universality places, before inviting athletes with OST to fulfill the total quota of 900. Additionally, OST places will be distributed by event according to the position of the FINA World Rankings during the qualifying deadline (3 July 2016).

The qualifying time standards must be obtained in World Championships, Continental Championships, Continental Qualification Events, National Championships and Trials, or International Competitions approved by FINA in the period between 1 March 2015 to 3 July 2016.

FINA qualifying standards are as follows:

Men's events			Women's events		
Event	OQT	OST	Event	OQT	OST
50 m freestyle	22.27	23.05	50 m freestyle	25.28	26.17
100 m freestyle	48.99	50.70	100 m freestyle	54.43	56.34
200 m freestyle	1:47.97	1:51.75	200 m freestyle	1:58.96	2:03.13
400 m freestyle	3:50.44	3:58.51	400 m freestyle	4:09.08	4:17.80
−	−	−	800 m freestyle	8:33.97	8:51.96
1500 m freestyle	15:14.77	15:46.79	−	−	−
100 m backstroke	54.36	56.26	100 m backstroke	1:00.25	1:02.36
200 m backstroke	1:58.22	2:02.36	200 m backstroke	2:10.60	2:15.17
100 m breaststroke	1:00.57	1:02.69	100 m breaststroke	1:07.85	1:10.22
200 m breaststroke	2:11.66	2:16.27	200 m breaststroke	2:26.94	2:32.08
100 m butterfly	52.36	54.19	100 m butterfly	58.74	1:00.80
200 m butterfly	1:56.97	2:01.06	200 m butterfly	2:09.33	2:13.86
200 m individual medley	2:00.28	2:04.39	200 m individual medley	2:14.26	2:18.96
400 m individual medley	4:16.71	4:25.69	400 m individual medley	4:43.46	4:53.38

== Individual events ==
Those who have achieved the Olympic Qualifying Time (OQT) or the Olympic Selection Time (OST), or have been guaranteed a Universality place are listed below for each of the following individual events:

=== Men's individual events ===
==== Men's 50 m freestyle ====
Qualification standard	No. of athletes	NOC	Qualified swimmers
Olympic Qualifying Time – 22.27	2	Australia	Matthew Abood; Cameron McEvoy
Olympic Qualifying Time – 22.27	2	Belgium	François Heersbrandt; Jasper Aerents
Olympic Qualifying Time – 22.27	2	Brazil	Bruno Fratus; Ítalo Duarte
Olympic Qualifying Time – 22.27	2	Canada	Santo Condorelli; Yuri Kisil
Olympic Qualifying Time – 22.27	2	China	Ning Zetao; Yu Hexin
Olympic Qualifying Time – 22.27	2	France	Frédérick Bousquet; Florent Manaudou
Olympic Qualifying Time – 22.27	2	Greece	Kristian Golomeev; Odysseas Meladinis
Olympic Qualifying Time – 22.27	2	Italy	Federico Bocchia; Luca Dotto
Olympic Qualifying Time – 22.27	2	Japan	Katsumi Nakamura; Shinri Shioura
Olympic Qualifying Time – 22.27	2	Poland	Paweł Juraszek; Filip Wypych
Olympic Qualifying Time – 22.27	2	South Africa	Douglas Erasmus; Brad Tandy
Olympic Qualifying Time – 22.27	2	United States	Nathan Adrian; Anthony Ervin
Olympic Qualifying Time – 22.27	1	Algeria	Oussama Sahnoune
Olympic Qualifying Time – 22.27	1	Argentina	Federico Grabich
Olympic Qualifying Time – 22.27	1	Egypt	Ali Khalafalla
Olympic Qualifying Time – 22.27	1	Finland	Ari-Pekka Liukkonen
Olympic Qualifying Time – 22.27	1	Germany	Damian Wierling
Olympic Qualifying Time – 22.27	1	Great Britain	Benjamin Proud
Olympic Qualifying Time – 22.27	1	Hungary	Krisztián Takács
Olympic Qualifying Time – 22.27	1	Israel	Ziv Kalontarov
Olympic Qualifying Time – 22.27	1	Lithuania	Simonas Bilis
Olympic Qualifying Time – 22.27	1	Puerto Rico	Erik Risolvato
Olympic Qualifying Time – 22.27	1	Romania	Norbert Trandafir
Olympic Qualifying Time – 22.27	1	Russia	Aleksei Brianskii
Olympic Qualifying Time – 22.27	1	Trinidad and Tobago	George Bovell
Olympic Qualifying Time – 22.27	1	Ukraine	Andriy Hovorov
Olympic Selection Time – 23.05	1	Albania	Sidni Hoxha^{[b]}
Olympic Selection Time – 23.05	1	Croatia	Mario Todorović^{[b]}
Olympic Selection Time – 23.05	1	Hong Kong	Geoffrey Cheah^{[b]}
Olympic Selection Time – 23.05	1	Ireland	Shane Ryan^{[a]}
Olympic Selection Time – 23.05	1	Suriname	Renzo Tjon A Joe
Olympic Selection Time – 23.05	1	Venezuela	Cristian Quintero^{[a]}
Universality Places	1	Armenia	Vahan Mkhitaryan
Universality Places	1	Bangladesh	Mahfizur Rahman Sagor
Universality Places	1	Bahrain	Farhan Saleh
Universality Places	1	Benin	Jules Bessan
Universality Places	1	Bolivia	José Alberto Quintanilla
Universality Places	1	Burkina Faso	Tindwende Sawadogo
Universality Places	1	Burundi	Billy-Scott Irakose
Universality Places	1	Central African Republic	Christian Nassif
Universality Places	1	Comoros	Athoumane Solihi
Universality Places	1	Republic of the Congo	Dienov Andres Koka
Universality Places	1	Djibouti	Bourhan Abro
Universality Places	1	Fiji	Meli Malani
Universality Places	1	Gabon	Maël Ambonguilat
Universality Places	1	The Gambia	Pap Jonga
Universality Places	1	Ghana	Abeiku Jackson
Universality Places	1	Guinea	Amadou Camara
Universality Places	1	Haiti	Frantz Dorsainvil
Universality Places	1	Kosovo	Lum Zhaveli
Universality Places	1	Laos	Santisouk Inthavong
Universality Places	1	Lebanon	Anthony Barbar
Universality Places	1	Libya	Ahmad Attellesey
Universality Places	1	Malawi	Brave Lifa
Universality Places	1	Maldives	Ibrahim Nishwan
Universality Places	1	Marshall Islands	Giordan Harris
Universality Places	1	Federated States of Micronesia	Dionisio Augustine
Universality Places	1	Mongolia	Batsaikhany Dulguun
Universality Places	1	Montenegro	Maksim Inić
Universality Places	1	Niger	Albachir Mouctar
Universality Places	1	Nigeria	Samson Opuakpo
Universality Places	1	Palau	Shawn Dingilius-Wallace
Universality Places	1	Rwanda	Eloi Imaniraguha
Universality Places	1	Saint Lucia	Jordan Augier
Universality Places	1	Saint Vincent and the Grenadines	Nikolas Sylvester
Universality Places	1	Senegal	Abdoul Niane
Universality Places	1	Seychelles	Adam Viktora
Universality Places	1	Sierra Leone	Osman Kamara
Universality Places	1	Sudan	Abdelaziz Mohamed Ahmed
Universality Places	1	Tajikistan	Olim Qurbonov
Universality Places	1	Tanzania	Hilal Hemed Hilal
Universality Places	1	Togo	Eméric Kpegba
Universality Places	1	Uganda	Joshua Tibatemwa
Total	85		

==== Men's 100 m freestyle ====
Qualification standard	No. of athletes	NOC	Qualified swimmers
Olympic Qualifying Time – 48.99	2	Australia	Kyle Chalmers; Cameron McEvoy
Olympic Qualifying Time – 48.99	2	Belgium	Glenn Surgeloose; Pieter Timmers
Olympic Qualifying Time – 48.99	2	Brazil	Marcelo Chierighini; Nicolas Oliveira
Olympic Qualifying Time – 48.99	2	Canada	Santo Condorelli; Yuri Kisil
Olympic Qualifying Time – 48.99	2	China	Ning Zetao; Yu Hexin
Olympic Qualifying Time – 48.99	2	France	Clément Mignon; Jérémy Stravius
Olympic Qualifying Time – 48.99	2	Germany	Björn Hornikel; Damian Wierling
Olympic Qualifying Time – 48.99	2	Great Britain	Benjamin Proud; Duncan Scott
Olympic Qualifying Time – 48.99	2	Hungary	Richárd Bohus; Dominik Kozma
Olympic Qualifying Time – 48.99	2	Italy	Luca Dotto; Filippo Magnini
Olympic Qualifying Time – 48.99	2	Japan	Katsumi Nakamura; Shinri Shioura
Olympic Qualifying Time – 48.99	2	Poland	Konrad Czerniak; Paweł Korzeniowski
Olympic Qualifying Time – 48.99	2	United States	Nathan Adrian; Caeleb Dressel
Olympic Qualifying Time – 48.99	1	Argentina	Federico Grabich
Olympic Qualifying Time – 48.99	1	Belarus	Yauhen Tsurkin
Olympic Qualifying Time – 48.99	1	Greece	Kristian Golomeev
Olympic Qualifying Time – 48.99	1	Lithuania	Simonas Bilis
Olympic Qualifying Time – 48.99	1	Netherlands	Sebastiaan Verschuren
Olympic Qualifying Time – 48.99	1	Romania	Marius Radu
Olympic Qualifying Time – 48.99	1	Russia	Andrey Grechin
Olympic Qualifying Time – 48.99	1	Serbia	Velimir Stjepanović
Olympic Qualifying Time – 48.99	1	Singapore	Joseph Schooling
Olympic Qualifying Time – 48.99	1	Slovenia	Anže Tavčar
Olympic Qualifying Time – 48.99	1	South Korea	Park Tae-hwan
Olympic Selection Time – 50.70	1	Algeria	Oussama Sahnoune^{[a]}
Olympic Selection Time – 50.70	1	Bulgaria	Aleksandar Nikolov^{[b]}
Olympic Selection Time – 50.70	1	Finland	Ari-Pekka Liukkonen^{[a]}
Olympic Selection Time – 50.70	1	Ireland	Shane Ryan^{[a]}
Olympic Selection Time – 50.70	1	Israel	Ziv Kalontorov^{[a]}
Olympic Selection Time – 50.70	1	Luxembourg	Raphaël Stacchiotti^{[b]}
Olympic Selection Time – 50.70	1	Mauritius	Bradley Vincent^{[b]}
Olympic Selection Time – 50.70	1	New Zealand	Matthew Stanley^{[a]}
Olympic Selection Time – 50.70	1	Paraguay	Benjamin Hockin^{[b]}
Olympic Selection Time – 50.70	1	Peru	Nicholas Magana^{[b]}
Olympic Selection Time – 50.70	1	Sri Lanka	Matthew Abeysinghe^{[b]}
Olympic Selection Time – 50.70	1	Trinidad and Tobago	Dylan Carter
Olympic Selection Time – 50.70	1	Venezuela	Cristian Quintero^{[a]}
Universality Places	1	Cambodia	Pou Sovijja
Universality Places	1	Ivory Coast	Thibaut Danho
Universality Places	1	Dominican Republic	Jhonny Pérez
Universality Places	1	Ethiopia	Robel Habte
Universality Places	1	Malta	Andrew Chetcuti
Universality Places	1	Mozambique	Igor Mogne
Universality Places	1	Nepal	Shirish Gurung
Universality Places	1	Nicaragua	Miguel Mena
Universality Places	1	Refugee Olympic Team	Rami Anis
Universality Places	1	Zimbabwe	Sean Gunn
Total	60		

==== Men's 200 m freestyle ====
Qualification standard	No. of athletes	NOC	Qualified swimmers
Olympic Qualifying Time – 1:47.97	2	Australia	Thomas Fraser-Holmes; David McKeon
Olympic Qualifying Time – 1:47.97	2	Belgium	Glenn Surgeloose; Pieter Timmers
Olympic Qualifying Time – 1:47.97	2	Brazil	Nicolas Oliveira; João de Lucca
Olympic Qualifying Time – 1:47.97	2	China	Shang Keyuan; Sun Yang
Olympic Qualifying Time – 1:47.97	2	France	Yannick Agnel; Jérémy Stravius
Olympic Qualifying Time – 1:47.97	2	Germany	Paul Biedermann; Christoph Fildebrandt
Olympic Qualifying Time – 1:47.97	2	Great Britain	James Guy; Cameron Kurle
Olympic Qualifying Time – 1:47.97	2	Hungary	Péter Bernek; Dominik Kozma
Olympic Qualifying Time – 1:47.97	2	Italy	Marco Belotti; Andrea Mitchell D'Arrigo
Olympic Qualifying Time – 1:47.97	2	Netherlands	Dion Dreesens; Sebastiaan Verschuren
Olympic Qualifying Time – 1:47.97	2	Poland	Kacper Majchrzak; Jan Świtkowski
Olympic Qualifying Time – 1:47.97	2	South Africa	Myles Brown; Chad le Clos
Olympic Qualifying Time – 1:47.97	2	United States	Conor Dwyer; Townley Haas
Olympic Qualifying Time – 1:47.97	1	Argentina	Federico Grabich
Olympic Qualifying Time – 1:47.97	1	Austria	Felix Auböck
Olympic Qualifying Time – 1:47.97	1	Egypt	Marwan El-Kamash
Olympic Qualifying Time – 1:47.97	1	Finland	Matias Koski
Olympic Qualifying Time – 1:47.97	1	Japan	Kosuke Hagino
Olympic Qualifying Time – 1:47.97	1	Malaysia	Welson Sim
Olympic Qualifying Time – 1:47.97	1	New Zealand	Matthew Stanley
Olympic Qualifying Time – 1:47.97	1	Russia	Alexander Krasnykh
Olympic Qualifying Time – 1:47.97	1	Serbia	Velimir Stjepanović
Olympic Qualifying Time – 1:47.97	1	South Korea	Park Tae-hwan
Olympic Qualifying Time – 1:47.97	1	Venezuela	Cristian Quintero
Olympic Selection Time – 1:51.75	1	Aruba	Mikel Schreuders^{[b]}
Olympic Selection Time – 1:51.75	1	El Salvador	Marcelo Acosta^{[a]}
Olympic Selection Time – 1:51.75	1	Jordan	Khader Baqlah^{[b]}
Olympic Selection Time – 1:51.75	1	Moldova	Alexei Sancov^{[b]}
Olympic Selection Time – 1:51.75	1	Norway	Henrik Christiansen^{[a]}
Olympic Selection Time – 1:51.75	1	Switzerland	Alexandre Haldemann
Olympic Selection Time – 1:51.75	1	Tunisia	Ahmed Mathlouthi^{[a]}
Olympic Selection Time – 1:51.75	1	Vietnam	Hoàng Quý Phước^{[b]}
Universality Places	1	Antigua and Barbuda	Noah Mascoll-Gomes
Universality Places	1	Iraq	Bakr Al-Dulaimi
Universality Places	1	Palestine	Ahmed Gebrel
Universality Places	1	Samoa	Brandon Schuster
Total	49		

==== Men's 400 m freestyle ====
Qualification standard	No. of athletes	NOC	Qualified swimmers
Olympic Qualifying Time – 3:50.44	2	Australia	Mack Horton; David McKeon
Olympic Qualifying Time – 3:50.44	2	Austria	Felix Auböck; David Brandl
Olympic Qualifying Time – 3:50.44	2	China	Sun Yang; Qiu Ziao
Olympic Qualifying Time – 3:50.44	2	Denmark	Mads Glæsner; Anton Ipsen
Olympic Qualifying Time – 3:50.44	2	Egypt	Ahmed Akram; Marwan El-Kamash
Olympic Qualifying Time – 3:50.44	2	Germany	Clemens Rapp; Florian Vogel
Olympic Qualifying Time – 3:50.44	2	Great Britain	James Guy; Stephen Milne
Olympic Qualifying Time – 3:50.44	2	Hungary	Péter Bernek; Gergő Kis
Olympic Qualifying Time – 3:50.44	2	New Zealand	Matthew Hutchins; Matthew Stanley
Olympic Qualifying Time – 3:50.44	2	Poland	Wojciech Wojdak; Filip Zaborowski
Olympic Qualifying Time – 3:50.44	2	Russia	Vyacheslav Andrushenko; Alexander Krasnykh
Olympic Qualifying Time – 3:50.44	2	United States	Conor Dwyer; Connor Jaeger
Olympic Qualifying Time – 3:50.44	1	Brazil	Luiz Altamir Melo
Olympic Qualifying Time – 3:50.44	1	Canada	Ryan Cochrane
Olympic Qualifying Time – 3:50.44	1	Czech Republic	Jan Micka
Olympic Qualifying Time – 3:50.44	1	Finland	Matias Koski
Olympic Qualifying Time – 3:50.44	1	France	Jordan Pothain
Olympic Qualifying Time – 3:50.44	1	Italy	Gabriele Detti
Olympic Qualifying Time – 3:50.44	1	Japan	Naito Ehara
Olympic Qualifying Time – 3:50.44	1	Malaysia	Welson Sim
Olympic Qualifying Time – 3:50.44	1	Netherlands	Maarten Brzoskowski
Olympic Qualifying Time – 3:50.44	1	Norway	Henrik Christiansen
Olympic Qualifying Time – 3:50.44	1	Serbia	Velimir Stjepanović
Olympic Qualifying Time – 3:50.44	1	South Africa	Myles Brown
Olympic Qualifying Time – 3:50.44	1	South Korea	Park Tae-hwan
Olympic Qualifying Time – 3:50.44	1	Spain	Miguel Durán
Olympic Qualifying Time – 3:50.44	1	Tunisia	Ahmed Mathlouthi
Olympic Qualifying Time – 3:50.44	1	Turkey	Nezir Karap
Olympic Selection Time – 3:58.51	1	Barbados	Alex Sobers^{[b]}
Olympic Selection Time – 3:58.51	1	El Salvador	Marcelo Acosta^{[a]}
Olympic Selection Time – 3:58.51	1	Georgia	Irakli Revishvili^{[b]}
Olympic Selection Time – 3:58.51	1	Greece	Dimitrios Dimitriou
Olympic Selection Time – 3:58.51	1	Philippines	Jessie Lacuna^{[b]}
Olympic Selection Time – 3:58.51	1	Venezuela	Cristian Quintero^{[a]}
Universality Places	1	Andorra	Pol Arias
Universality Places	1	Cayman Islands	Geoffrey Butler
Universality Places	1	Cyprus	Iacovos Hadjiconstantinou
Universality Places	1	Pakistan	Haris Bandey
Total	50		

==== Men's 1500 m freestyle ====
Qualification standard	No. of athletes	NOC	Qualified swimmers
Olympic Qualifying Time – 15:14.77	2	Australia	Mack Horton; Jack McLoughlin
Olympic Qualifying Time – 15:14.77	2	Brazil	Brandonn Almeida; Miguel Valente
Olympic Qualifying Time – 15:14.77	2	China	Qiu Ziao; Sun Yang
Olympic Qualifying Time – 15:14.77	2	Denmark	Anton Ipsen; Pál Joensen
Olympic Qualifying Time – 15:14.77	2	France	Nicolas D'Oriano; Damien Joly
Olympic Qualifying Time – 15:14.77	2	Great Britain	Stephen Milne; Timothy Shuttleworth
Olympic Qualifying Time – 15:14.77	2	Hungary	Gergely Gyurta; Kristóf Rasovszky
Olympic Qualifying Time – 15:14.77	2	Italy	Gabriele Detti; Gregorio Paltrinieri
Olympic Qualifying Time – 15:14.77	2	Poland	Mateusz Sawrymowicz; Wojciech Wojdak
Olympic Qualifying Time – 15:14.77	2	Russia	Ilya Druzhinin; Yaroslav Potapov
Olympic Qualifying Time – 15:14.77	2	Spain	Antonio Arroyo; Marc Sánchez
Olympic Qualifying Time – 15:14.77	2	Ukraine	Serhiy Frolov; Mykhailo Romanchuk
Olympic Qualifying Time – 15:14.77	2	United States	Connor Jaeger; Jordan Wilimovsky
Olympic Qualifying Time – 15:14.77	1	Argentina	~~Martín Carrizo~~; Martín Naidich
Olympic Qualifying Time – 15:14.77	1	Austria	Felix Auböck
Olympic Qualifying Time – 15:14.77	1	Canada	Ryan Cochrane
Olympic Qualifying Time – 15:14.77	1	Czech Republic	Jan Micka
Olympic Qualifying Time – 15:14.77	1	Ecuador	Esteban Enderica
Olympic Qualifying Time – 15:14.77	1	Egypt	Ahmed Akram
Olympic Qualifying Time – 15:14.77	1	El Salvador	Marcelo Acosta
Olympic Qualifying Time – 15:14.77	1	Germany	Florian Wellbrock
Olympic Qualifying Time – 15:14.77	1	Mexico	Ricardo Vargas
Olympic Qualifying Time – 15:14.77	1	Norway	Henrik Christiansen
Olympic Qualifying Time – 15:14.77	1	Slovakia	Richárd Nagy
Olympic Qualifying Time – 15:14.77	1	South Africa	Matthew Meyer
Olympic Qualifying Time – 15:14.77	1	South Korea	Park Tae-hwan
Olympic Qualifying Time – 15:14.77	1	Tunisia	Oussama Mellouli
Olympic Selection Time – 15:46.79	1	Bosnia and Herzegovina	Mihajlo Čeprkalo^{[b]}
Olympic Selection Time – 15:46.79	1	Chile	Felipe Tapia^{[b]}
Olympic Selection Time – 15:46.79	1	Cook Islands	Wesley Roberts^{[b]}
Olympic Selection Time – 15:46.79	1	Malaysia	Welson Sim^{[a]}
Olympic Selection Time – 15:46.79	1	New Zealand	Matthew Hutchins^{[a]}
Olympic Selection Time – 15:46.79	1	Slovenia	Martin Bau
Universality Places	0	—	—
Total	46		

==== Men's 100 m backstroke ====
Qualification standard	No. of athletes	NOC	Qualified swimmers
Olympic Qualifying Time – 54.36	2	Australia	Josh Beaver; Mitch Larkin
Olympic Qualifying Time – 54.36	2	Belarus	Viktar Staselovich; Mikita Tsmyh
Olympic Qualifying Time – 54.36	2	China	Li Guangyuan; Xu Jiayu
Olympic Qualifying Time – 54.36	2	Japan	Junya Hasegawa; Ryosuke Irie
Olympic Qualifying Time – 54.36	2	Poland	Radosław Kawęcki; Tomasz Polewka
Olympic Qualifying Time – 54.36	2	Russia	Evgeny Rylov; Grigory Tarasevich
Olympic Qualifying Time – 54.36	2	United States	Ryan Murphy; David Plummer
Olympic Qualifying Time – 54.36	1	Brazil	Guilherme Guido
Olympic Qualifying Time – 54.36	1	Canada	Javier Acevedo
Olympic Qualifying Time – 54.36	1	France	Camille Lacourt
Olympic Qualifying Time – 54.36	1	Germany	Jan-Philip Glania
Olympic Qualifying Time – 54.36	1	Great Britain	Chris Walker-Hebborn
Olympic Qualifying Time – 54.36	1	Greece	Apostolos Christou
Olympic Qualifying Time – 54.36	1	Hungary	Gábor Balog
Olympic Qualifying Time – 54.36	1	Ireland	Shane Ryan
Olympic Qualifying Time – 54.36	1	Israel	Yakov-Yan Toumarkin
Olympic Qualifying Time – 54.36	1	Italy	Simone Sabbioni
Olympic Qualifying Time – 54.36	1	Lithuania	Danas Rapšys
Olympic Qualifying Time – 54.36	1	New Zealand	Corey Main
Olympic Qualifying Time – 54.36	1	Romania	Robert Glință
Olympic Qualifying Time – 54.36	1	Singapore	Quah Zheng Wen
Olympic Qualifying Time – 54.36	1	South Africa	Christopher Reid
Olympic Selection Time – 56.26	1	Jamaica	Timothy Wynter^{[b]}
Olympic Selection Time – 56.26	1	South Korea	Won Young-jun
Olympic Selection Time – 56.26	1	Spain	Hugo González^{[a]}
Olympic Selection Time – 56.26	1	Venezuela	Albert Subirats^{[a]}
Universality Places	1	Botswana	David van der Colff
Universality Places	1	Kenya	Hamdan Bayusuf
Universality Places	1	Morocco	Driss Lahrichi
Universality Places	1	Qatar	Noah Al-Khulaifi
Universality Places	1	Turkmenistan	Merdan Ataýew
Universality Places	1	United Arab Emirates	Yaaqoub Al-Saadi
Total	39		

==== Men's 200 m backstroke ====
Qualification standard	No. of athletes	NOC	Qualified swimmers
Olympic Qualifying Time – 1:58.22	2	Australia	Josh Beaver; Mitch Larkin
Olympic Qualifying Time – 1:58.22	2	China	Li Guangyuan; Xu Jiayu
Olympic Qualifying Time – 1:58.22	2	Germany	Christian Diener; Jan-Philip Glania
Olympic Qualifying Time – 1:58.22	2	Hungary	Dávid Földházi; Ádám Telegdy
Olympic Qualifying Time – 1:58.22	2	Japan	Ryosuke Irie; Masaki Kaneko
Olympic Qualifying Time – 1:58.22	2	Russia	Evgeny Rylov; Andrey Shabasov
Olympic Qualifying Time – 1:58.22	2	United States	Ryan Murphy; Jacob Pebley
Olympic Qualifying Time – 1:58.22	1	Belarus	Mikita Tsmyh
Olympic Qualifying Time – 1:58.22	1	Brazil	Leonardo de Deus
Olympic Qualifying Time – 1:58.22	1	Greece	Apostolos Christou
Olympic Qualifying Time – 1:58.22	1	Israel	Yakov-Yan Toumarkin
Olympic Qualifying Time – 1:58.22	1	Lithuania	Danas Rapšys
Olympic Qualifying Time – 1:58.22	1	New Zealand	Corey Main
Olympic Qualifying Time – 1:58.22	1	Poland	Radosław Kawęcki
Olympic Qualifying Time – 1:58.22	1	Spain	Hugo González
Olympic Selection Time – 2:02.36	1	Colombia	Omar Pinzón
Olympic Selection Time – 2:02.36	1	Romania	Robert Glință^{[a]}
Olympic Selection Time – 2:02.36	1	Virgin Islands	Rexford Tullius^{[b]}
Universality Places	1	Azerbaijan	Boris Kirillov
Total	26		

==== Men's 100 m breaststroke ====
Qualification standard	No. of athletes	NOC	Qualified swimmers
Olympic Qualifying Time – 1:00.57	2	Australia	Jake Packard; Joshua Palmer
Olympic Qualifying Time – 1:00.57	2	Brazil	Felipe França Silva; João Gomes Júnior
Olympic Qualifying Time – 1:00.57	2	China	Li Xiang; Yan Zibei
Olympic Qualifying Time – 1:00.57	2	Great Britain	Adam Peaty; Ross Murdoch
Olympic Qualifying Time – 1:00.57	2	Japan	Yasuhiro Koseki; Ippei Watanabe
Olympic Qualifying Time – 1:00.57	2	Lithuania	Andrius Šidlauskas; Giedrius Titenis
Olympic Qualifying Time – 1:00.57	2	Russia	Kirill Prigoda; Vsevolod Zanko
Olympic Qualifying Time – 1:00.57	2	United States	Kevin Cordes; Cody Miller
Olympic Qualifying Time – 1:00.57	1	Colombia	Jorge Murillo
Olympic Qualifying Time – 1:00.57	1	Germany	Christian vom Lehn
Olympic Qualifying Time – 1:00.57	1	Greece	Panagiotis Samilidis
Olympic Qualifying Time – 1:00.57	1	Hungary	Dániel Gyurta
Olympic Qualifying Time – 1:00.57	1	Iceland	Anton Sveinn McKee
Olympic Qualifying Time – 1:00.57	1	Italy	Andrea Toniato
Olympic Qualifying Time – 1:00.57	1	Kazakhstan	Dmitriy Balandin
Olympic Qualifying Time – 1:00.57	1	New Zealand	Glenn Snyders
Olympic Qualifying Time – 1:00.57	1	Poland	Marcin Stolarski
Olympic Qualifying Time – 1:00.57	1	Serbia	Čaba Silađi
Olympic Qualifying Time – 1:00.57	1	Slovakia	Tomáš Klobučník
Olympic Qualifying Time – 1:00.57	1	Slovenia	Damir Dugonjič
Olympic Qualifying Time – 1:00.57	1	South Africa	Cameron van der Burgh
Olympic Selection Time – 1:02.69	1	Bahamas	Dustin Tynes^{[b]}
Olympic Selection Time – 1:02.69	1	Canada	Jason Block
Olympic Selection Time – 1:02.69	1	Finland	Matti Mattsson^{[a]}
Olympic Selection Time – 1:02.69	1	Ireland	Nicholas Quinn^{[a]}
Olympic Selection Time – 1:02.69	1	Luxembourg	Laurent Carnol^{[a]}
Olympic Selection Time – 1:02.69	1	Panama	Édgar Crespo^{[b]}
Olympic Selection Time – 1:02.69	1	Switzerland	Yannick Käser^{[a]}
Olympic Selection Time – 1:02.69	1	Sweden	Erik Persson^{[a]}
Olympic Selection Time – 1:02.69	1	Syria	Azad Al-Barazi^{[b]}
Olympic Selection Time – 1:02.69	1	Thailand	Radomyos Matjiur^{[b]}
Olympic Selection Time – 1:02.69	1	Uruguay	Martín Melconian^{[b]}
Olympic Selection Time – 1:02.69	1	Uzbekistan	Vladislav Mustafin^{[b]}
Olympic Selection Time – 1:02.69	1	Venezuela	Carlos Claverie^{[a]}
Universality Places	1	Bermuda	Julian Fletcher
Universality Places	1	Grenada	Corey Ollivierre
Universality Places	1	Guam	Benjamin Schulte
Universality Places	1	Tonga	Amini Fonua
Total	46		

==== Men's 200 m breaststroke ====
Qualification standard	No. of athletes	NOC	Qualified swimmers
Olympic Qualifying Time – 2:11.66	2	Brazil	Tales Cerdeira; Thiago Simon
Olympic Qualifying Time – 2:11.66	2	China	Li Xiang; Mao Feilian
Olympic Qualifying Time – 2:11.66	2	Great Britain	Craig Benson; Andrew Willis
Olympic Qualifying Time – 2:11.66	2	Greece	Dimitrios Koulouris; Panagiotis Samilidis
Olympic Qualifying Time – 2:11.66	2	Hungary	Dániel Gyurta; Dávid Horváth*
Olympic Qualifying Time – 2:11.66	2	Japan	Yasuhiro Koseki; Ippei Watanabe
Olympic Qualifying Time – 2:11.66	2	Russia	Anton Chupkov; Ilya Khomenko
Olympic Qualifying Time – 2:11.66	2	South Africa	Jarred Crous; Cameron van der Burgh
Olympic Qualifying Time – 2:11.66	2	United States	Kevin Cordes; Josh Prenot
Olympic Qualifying Time – 2:11.66	1	Canada	Ashton Baumann
Olympic Qualifying Time – 2:11.66	1	Colombia	Jorge Murillo
Olympic Qualifying Time – 2:11.66	1	Finland	Matti Mattsson
Olympic Qualifying Time – 2:11.66	1	Germany	Marco Koch
Olympic Qualifying Time – 2:11.66	1	Iceland	Anton Sveinn McKee
Olympic Qualifying Time – 2:11.66	1	Ireland	Nicholas Quinn
Olympic Qualifying Time – 2:11.66	1	Italy	Luca Pizzini
Olympic Qualifying Time – 2:11.66	1	Kazakhstan	Dmitriy Balandin
Olympic Qualifying Time – 2:11.66	1	Lithuania	Giedrius Titenis
Olympic Qualifying Time – 2:11.66	1	Luxembourg	Laurent Carnol
Olympic Qualifying Time – 2:11.66	1	South Korea	Choi Kyu-woong
Olympic Qualifying Time – 2:11.66	1	Sweden	Erik Persson
Olympic Qualifying Time – 2:11.66	1	Switzerland	Yannick Käser
Olympic Qualifying Time – 2:11.66	1	Ukraine	Dmytro Oseledets
Olympic Qualifying Time – 2:11.66	1	Venezuela	Carlos Claverie
Olympic Selection Time – 2:16.27	1	Belgium	Basten Caerts
Olympic Selection Time – 2:16.27	1	Chinese Taipei	Lee Hsuan-yen^{[b]}
Olympic Selection Time – 2:16.27	1	Estonia	Martin Allikvee^{[b]}
Olympic Selection Time – 2:16.27	1	New Zealand	Glenn Snyders^{[a]}
Universality Places	1	Kyrgyzstan	Denis Petrashov
Universality Places	1	Iran	Arya Nasimi Shad
Total	39		

==== Men's 100 m butterfly ====
Qualification standard	No. of athletes	NOC	Qualified swimmers
Olympic Qualifying Time – 52.36	2	Australia	Grant Irvine; David Morgan
Olympic Qualifying Time – 52.36	2	Belarus	Pavel Sankovich; Yauhen Tsurkin
Olympic Qualifying Time – 52.36	2	Brazil	Marcos Macedo; Henrique Martins
Olympic Qualifying Time – 52.36	2	China	Li Zhuhao; Zhang Qibin
Olympic Qualifying Time – 52.36	2	France	Mehdy Metella; Jérémy Stravius
Olympic Qualifying Time – 52.36	2	Hungary	László Cseh; Bence Pulai
Olympic Qualifying Time – 52.36	2	Italy	Piero Codia; Matteo Rivolta
Olympic Qualifying Time – 52.36	2	Poland	Konrad Czerniak; Paweł Korzeniowski
Olympic Qualifying Time – 52.36	2	Russia	Evgeny Koptelov; Aleksandr Sadovnikov
Olympic Qualifying Time – 52.36	2	Singapore	Quah Zheng Wen; Joseph Schooling
Olympic Qualifying Time – 52.36	2	United States	Michael Phelps; Tom Shields
Olympic Qualifying Time – 52.36	1	Argentina	Santiago Grassi
Olympic Qualifying Time – 52.36	1	Germany	Steffen Deibler
Olympic Qualifying Time – 52.36	1	Great Britain	James Guy
Olympic Qualifying Time – 52.36	1	Guatemala	Luis Martínez
Olympic Qualifying Time – 52.36	1	Japan	Takuro Fujii
Olympic Qualifying Time – 52.36	1	Mexico	Long Yuan Gutiérrez
Olympic Qualifying Time – 52.36	1	Netherlands	Joeri Verlinden
Olympic Qualifying Time – 52.36	1	South Africa	Chad le Clos
Olympic Qualifying Time – 52.36	1	Ukraine	Lyubomyr Lemeshko
Olympic Qualifying Time – 52.36	1	Venezuela	Albert Subirats
Olympic Selection Time – 54.19	1	Canada	Santo Condorelli^{[a]}
Olympic Selection Time – 54.19	1	Indonesia	Glenn Victor Sutanto
Olympic Selection Time – 54.19	1	Papua New Guinea	Ryan Pini^{[b]}
Universality Places	1	Guyana	Hannibal Gaskin
Universality Places	1	Honduras	Allan Gutiérrez
Universality Places	1	Kuwait	Abbas Qali
Universality Places	1	Madagascar	Anthonny Sitraka Ralefy
Universality Places	1	Mali	Oumar Touré
Universality Places	1	Myanmar	Thint Myaat
Universality Places	1	Refugee Olympic Team	Rami Anis
Universality Places	1	Zambia	Ralph Goveia
Total	43		

==== Men's 200 m butterfly ====
Qualification standard	No. of athletes	NOC	Qualified swimmers
Olympic Qualifying Time – 1:56.97	2	Australia	Grant Irvine; David Morgan
Olympic Qualifying Time – 1:56.97	2	Brazil	Kaio de Almeida; Leonardo de Deus
Olympic Qualifying Time – 1:56.97	2	China	Li Zhuhao; Wu Yuhang
Olympic Qualifying Time – 1:56.97	2	Hungary	László Cseh; Tamás Kenderesi
Olympic Qualifying Time – 1:56.97	2	Japan	Masato Sakai; Daiya Seto
Olympic Qualifying Time – 1:56.97	2	Russia	Evgeny Koptelov; Daniil Pakhomov
Olympic Qualifying Time – 1:56.97	2	United States	Michael Phelps; Tom Shields
Olympic Qualifying Time – 1:56.97	1	Belgium	Louis Croenen
Olympic Qualifying Time – 1:56.97	1	Colombia	Jonathan Gómez
Olympic Qualifying Time – 1:56.97	1	Denmark	Viktor Bromer
Olympic Qualifying Time – 1:56.97	1	France	Jordan Coelho
Olympic Qualifying Time – 1:56.97	1	Greece	Stefanos Dimitriadis
Olympic Qualifying Time – 1:56.97	1	Poland	Jan Świtkowski
Olympic Qualifying Time – 1:56.97	1	Singapore	Quah Zheng Wen
Olympic Qualifying Time – 1:56.97	1	South Africa	Chad le Clos
Olympic Qualifying Time – 1:56.97	1	Spain	Carlos Peralta
Olympic Selection Time – 2:01.06	1	India	Sajan Prakash^{[b]}
Olympic Selection Time – 2:01.06	1	Israel	Gal Nevo^{[a]}
Olympic Selection Time – 2:01.06	1	New Zealand	Bradlee Ashby^{[a]}
Olympic Selection Time – 2:01.06	1	Slovenia	Robert Žbogar
Olympic Selection Time – 2:01.06	1	Sweden	Simon Sjödin^{[a]}
Universality Places	0	—	—
Total	28		

==== Men's 200 m individual medley ====
Qualification standard	No. of athletes	NOC	Qualified swimmers
Olympic Qualifying Time – 2:00.28	2	Australia	Thomas Fraser-Holmes; Travis Mahoney
Olympic Qualifying Time – 2:00.28	2	Brazil	Thiago Pereira; Henrique Rodrigues
Olympic Qualifying Time – 2:00.28	2	China	Hu Yixuan; Wang Shun
Olympic Qualifying Time – 2:00.28	2	Great Britain	Ieuan Lloyd; Daniel Wallace
Olympic Qualifying Time – 2:00.28	2	Japan	Hiromasa Fujimori; Kosuke Hagino
Olympic Qualifying Time – 2:00.28	2	Portugal	Diogo Carvalho; Alexis Santos
Olympic Qualifying Time – 2:00.28	2	United States	Ryan Lochte; Michael Phelps
Olympic Qualifying Time – 2:00.28	1	Belgium	Emmanuel Vanluchene
Olympic Qualifying Time – 2:00.28	1	Egypt	Mohamed Hussein
Olympic Qualifying Time – 2:00.28	1	Germany	Philip Heintz
Olympic Qualifying Time – 2:00.28	1	Greece	Andreas Vazaios
Olympic Qualifying Time – 2:00.28	1	Hungary	Dávid Verrasztó
Olympic Qualifying Time – 2:00.28	1	Israel	Gal Nevo
Olympic Qualifying Time – 2:00.28	1	Italy	Federico Turrini
Olympic Qualifying Time – 2:00.28	1	Luxembourg	Raphaël Stacchiotti
Olympic Qualifying Time – 2:00.28	1	New Zealand	Bradlee Ashby
Olympic Qualifying Time – 2:00.28	1	Russia	Semen Makovich
Olympic Qualifying Time – 2:00.28	1	Spain	Eduardo Solaeche
Olympic Qualifying Time – 2:00.28	1	Sweden	Simon Sjödin
Olympic Qualifying Time – 2:00.28	1	Switzerland	Jérémy Desplanches
Olympic Selection Time – 2:04.39	1	Latvia	Uvis Kalniņš
Olympic Selection Time – 2:04.39	1	Macedonia	Marko Blaževski^{[b]}
Olympic Selection Time – 2:04.39	1	Tunisia	Ahmed Mathlouthi^{[a]}
Universality Places	0	—	—
Total	30		

==== Men's 400 m individual medley ====
Qualification standard	No. of athletes	NOC	Qualified swimmers
Olympic Qualifying Time – 4:16.71	2	Australia	Thomas Fraser-Holmes; Travis Mahoney
Olympic Qualifying Time – 4:16.71	2	Germany	Jacob Heidtmann; Johannes Hintze
Olympic Qualifying Time – 4:16.71	2	Hungary	Gergely Gyurta; Dávid Verrasztó
Olympic Qualifying Time – 4:16.71	2	Italy	Luca Marin; Federico Turrini
Olympic Qualifying Time – 4:16.71	2	Japan	Kosuke Hagino; Daiya Seto
Olympic Qualifying Time – 4:16.71	2	South Africa	Michael Meyer; Sebastien Rousseau
Olympic Qualifying Time – 4:16.71	2	United States	Chase Kalisz; Jay Litherland
Olympic Qualifying Time – 4:16.71	1	Brazil	Brandonn Almeida
Olympic Qualifying Time – 4:16.71	1	China	Wang Shun
Olympic Qualifying Time – 4:16.71	1	Great Britain	Max Litchfield
Olympic Qualifying Time – 4:16.71	1	Slovakia	Richárd Nagy
Olympic Qualifying Time – 4:16.71	1	Spain	Joan Lluís Pons
Olympic Selection Time – 4:25.69	1	Angola	Pedro Pinotes^{[b]}
Olympic Selection Time – 4:25.69	1	Czech Republic	Pavel Janeček
Olympic Selection Time – 4:25.69	1	Israel	Gal Nevo^{[a]}
Olympic Selection Time – 4:25.69	1	Liechtenstein	Christoph Meier^{[b]}
Olympic Selection Time – 4:25.69	1	Luxembourg	Raphaël Stacchiotti^{[a]}
Olympic Selection Time – 4:25.69	1	Portugal	Alexis Santos^{[a]}
Olympic Selection Time – 4:25.69	1	Switzerland	Jérémy Desplanches^{[a]}
Universality Places	1	Cuba	Luis Vega
Total	27		

=== Women's individual events ===
==== Women's 50 m freestyle ====
Qualification standard	No. of athletes	NOC	Qualified swimmers
Olympic Qualifying Time – 25.28	2	Australia	Bronte Campbell; Cate Campbell
Olympic Qualifying Time – 25.28	2	Belarus	Aliaksandra Herasimenia; Yuliya Khitraya
Olympic Qualifying Time – 25.28	2	Brazil	Graciele Herrmann; Etiene Medeiros
Olympic Qualifying Time – 25.28	2	Canada	Chantal van Landeghem; Michelle Williams
Olympic Qualifying Time – 25.28	2	China	Chen Xinyi; Liu Xiang
Olympic Qualifying Time – 25.28	2	Denmark	Pernille Blume; Jeanette Ottesen
Olympic Qualifying Time – 25.28	2	France	Mélanie Henique; Anna Santamans
Olympic Qualifying Time – 25.28	2	Greece	Theodora Drakou; Theodora Giareni
Olympic Qualifying Time – 25.28	2	Israel	Andrea Murez; Zohar Shikler
Olympic Qualifying Time – 25.28	2	Italy	Silvia Di Pietro; Erika Ferraioli
Olympic Qualifying Time – 25.28	2	Japan	Rikako Ikee; Yayoi Matsumoto
Olympic Qualifying Time – 25.28	2	Netherlands	Inge Dekker; Ranomi Kromowidjojo
Olympic Qualifying Time – 25.28	2	Poland	Anna Dowgiert; Aleksandra Urbańczyk
Olympic Qualifying Time – 25.28	2	Russia	Natalya Lovtsova; Rozaliya Nasretdinova
Olympic Qualifying Time – 25.28	2	Sweden	Therese Alshammar; Sarah Sjöström
Olympic Qualifying Time – 25.28	2	United States	Simone Manuel; Abbey Weitzeil
Olympic Qualifying Time – 25.28	1	Austria	Birgit Koschischek
Olympic Qualifying Time – 25.28	1	Bahamas	Arianna Vanderpool-Wallace
Olympic Qualifying Time – 25.28	1	Egypt	Farida Osman
Olympic Qualifying Time – 25.28	1	Germany	Dorothea Brandt
Olympic Qualifying Time – 25.28	1	Great Britain	Francesca Halsall
Olympic Qualifying Time – 25.28	1	Hungary	Flóra Molnár
Olympic Qualifying Time – 25.28	1	Mexico	Liliana Ibáñez
Olympic Qualifying Time – 25.28	1	Norway	Susann Bjørnsen
Olympic Qualifying Time – 25.28	1	Puerto Rico	Vanessa García
Olympic Qualifying Time – 25.28	1	Switzerland	Sasha Touretski
Olympic Qualifying Time – 25.28	1	Ukraine	Darya Stepanyuk
Olympic Selection Time – 26.17	1	Aruba	Allyson Ponson^{[b]}
Olympic Selection Time – 26.17	1	Bolivia	Karen Torrez^{[b]}
Olympic Selection Time – 26.17	1	Botswana	Naomi Ruele^{[b]}
Olympic Selection Time – 26.17	1	Chinese Taipei	Lin Pei-wun^{[b]}
Olympic Selection Time – 26.17	1	Colombia	Isabella Arcila^{[b]}
Olympic Selection Time – 26.17	1	Hong Kong	Camille Cheng^{[a]}
Olympic Selection Time – 26.17	1	Luxembourg	Julie Meynen
Olympic Selection Time – 26.17	1	Syria	Bayan Jumah^{[b]}
Universality Places	1	Antigua and Barbuda	Samantha Roberts
Universality Places	1	Armenia	Monika Vasilyan
Universality Places	1	Bahrain	Fatema Almahmeed
Universality Places	1	Bangladesh	Sonia Akter Tumpa
Universality Places	1	Benin	Laraïba Seibou
Universality Places	1	Bermuda	Rebecca Heyliger
Universality Places	1	British Virgin Islands	Elinah Phillip
Universality Places	1	Burkina Faso	Angelika Ouedraogo
Universality Places	1	Burundi	Elsie Uwamahoro
Universality Places	1	Cambodia	Hemthon Vitiny
Universality Places	1	Central African Republic	Chloe Sauvourel
Universality Places	1	Comoros	Nazlati Mohamed Andhumdine
Universality Places	1	Republic of the Congo	Bellore Sangala
Universality Places	1	Dominican Republic	Dorian McMenemy
Universality Places	1	Ethiopia	Rahel Gebresilassie
Universality Places	1	Guinea	Mariama Sow
Universality Places	1	Guyana	Jamila Sanmoogan
Universality Places	1	Haiti	Naomy Grand'Pierre
Universality Places	1	Jordan	Talita Baqlah
Universality Places	1	Kuwait	Faye Sultan
Universality Places	1	Laos	Siri Arun Budcharern
Universality Places	1	Malawi	Ammara Pinto
Universality Places	1	Mali	Fatoumata Samassékou
Universality Places	1	Malta	Nicola Muscat
Universality Places	1	Marshall Islands	Colleen Furgeson
Universality Places	1	Federated States of Micronesia	Debra Daniel
Universality Places	1	Mongolia	Yesuin Bayar
Universality Places	1	Morocco	Noura Mana
Universality Places	1	Myanmar	Ei Ei Thet
Universality Places	1	Niger	Roukaya Mahamane
Universality Places	1	Pakistan	Lianna Swan
Universality Places	1	Palau	Dirngulbai Misech
Universality Places	1	Palestine	Mary Al-Atrash
Universality Places	1	Senegal	Awa Ly N'diaye
Universality Places	1	Sierra Leone	Bunturabie Jalloh
Universality Places	1	Sudan	Haneen Ibrahim
Universality Places	1	Tajikistan	Anastasia Tyurina
Universality Places	1	Tanzania	Magdalena Moshi
Universality Places	1	Togo	Adzo Kpossi
Universality Places	1	Tonga	Irene Prescott
Universality Places	1	United Arab Emirates	Nada Al-Bedwawi
Total	92		

==== Women's 100 m freestyle ====
Qualification standard	No. of athletes	NOC	Qualified swimmers
Olympic Qualifying Time – 54.43	2	Australia	Bronte Campbell; Cate Campbell
Olympic Qualifying Time – 54.43	2	Brazil	Larissa Oliveira; Etiene Medeiros
Olympic Qualifying Time – 54.43	2	Canada	Penny Oleksiak; Chantal van Landeghem
Olympic Qualifying Time – 54.43	2	China	Shen Duo; Zhu Menghui
Olympic Qualifying Time – 54.43	2	France	Charlotte Bonnet; Béryl Gastaldello
Olympic Qualifying Time – 54.43	2	Italy	Erika Ferraioli; Federica Pellegrini
Olympic Qualifying Time – 54.43	2	Japan	Rikako Ikee; Miki Uchida
Olympic Qualifying Time – 54.43	2	Netherlands	Femke Heemskerk; Ranomi Kromowidjojo
Olympic Qualifying Time – 54.43	2	Sweden	Michelle Coleman; Sarah Sjöström
Olympic Qualifying Time – 54.43	2	United States	Simone Manuel; Abbey Weitzeil
Olympic Qualifying Time – 54.43	1	Bahamas	Arianna Vanderpool-Wallace
Olympic Qualifying Time – 54.43	1	Belarus	Aliaksandra Herasimenia
Olympic Qualifying Time – 54.43	1	Denmark	Pernille Blume
Olympic Qualifying Time – 54.43	1	Israel	Andrea Murez
Olympic Qualifying Time – 54.43	1	Poland	Katarzyna Wilk
Olympic Qualifying Time – 54.43	1	Russia	Veronika Popova
Olympic Selection Time – 56.34	1	Bulgaria	Nina Rangelova^{[a]}
Olympic Selection Time – 56.34	1	Hong Kong	Camille Cheng^{[a]}
Olympic Selection Time – 56.34	1	Luxembourg	Julie Meynen
Olympic Selection Time – 56.34	1	Norway	Susann Bjørnsen^{[a]}
Olympic Selection Time – 56.34	1	Philippines	Jasmine Alkhaldi^{[b]}
Olympic Selection Time – 56.34	1	Switzerland	Maria Ugolkova^{[a]}
Olympic Selection Time – 56.34	1	Thailand	Natthanan Junkrajang^{[b]}
Universality Places	1	Albania	Nikol Merizaj
Universality Places	1	Andorra	Mónica Ramírez
Universality Places	1	Angola	Ana Sofia Nóbrega
Universality Places	1	Azerbaijan	Fatima Alkaramova
Universality Places	1	Cook Islands	Tracy Keith-Matchitt
Universality Places	1	Madagascar	Estellah Fils Rabetsara
Universality Places	1	Maldives	Aminath Shajan
Universality Places	1	Mauritius	Heather Arseth
Universality Places	1	Montenegro	Jovana Terzić
Universality Places	1	Paraguay	Karen Riveros
Universality Places	1	Romania	Ana Iulia Dascăl
Universality Places	1	Uruguay	Ines Remersaro
Universality Places	1	Zambia	Jade Howard
Total	46		

==== Women's 200 m freestyle ====
Qualification standard	No. of athletes	NOC	Qualified swimmers
Olympic Qualifying Time – 1:58.96	2	Australia	Bronte Barratt; Emma McKeon
Olympic Qualifying Time – 1:58.96	2	Brazil	Manuella Lyrio; Larissa Oliveira
Olympic Qualifying Time – 1:58.96	2	Canada	Brittany MacLean; Penny Oleksiak
Olympic Qualifying Time – 1:58.96	2	China	Ai Yanhan; Shen Duo
Olympic Qualifying Time – 1:58.96	2	France	Coralie Balmy; Charlotte Bonnet
Olympic Qualifying Time – 1:58.96	2	Great Britain	Georgia Coates; Eleanor Faulkner
Olympic Qualifying Time – 1:58.96	2	Hong Kong	Camille Cheng; Siobhán Haughey
Olympic Qualifying Time – 1:58.96	2	Hungary	Ajna Késely; Evelyn Verrasztó
Olympic Qualifying Time – 1:58.96	2	Italy	Federica Pellegrini; Alice Mizzau
Olympic Qualifying Time – 1:58.96	2	Japan	Chihiro Igarashi; Rikako Ikee
Olympic Qualifying Time – 1:58.96	2	Netherlands	Femke Heemskerk; Robin Neumann
Olympic Qualifying Time – 1:58.96	2	Russia	Arina Openysheva; Veronika Popova
Olympic Qualifying Time – 1:58.96	2	Spain	Patricia Castro; Melani Costa
Olympic Qualifying Time – 1:58.96	2	Sweden	Sarah Sjöström; Michelle Coleman
Olympic Qualifying Time – 1:58.96	2	United States	Missy Franklin; Katie Ledecky
Olympic Qualifying Time – 1:58.96	1	Bulgaria	Nina Rangelova
Olympic Qualifying Time – 1:58.96	1	Germany	Annika Bruhn
Olympic Qualifying Time – 1:58.96	1	Serbia	Katarina Simonović
Olympic Selection Time – 2:03.13	1	Bahamas	Joanna Evans^{[a]}
Olympic Selection Time – 2:03.13	1	Cuba	Elisbet Gamez^{[b]}
Olympic Selection Time – 2:03.13	1	Czech Republic	Barbora Seemanová
Olympic Selection Time – 2:03.13	1	Honduras	Sara Pastrana^{[b]}
Olympic Selection Time – 2:03.13	1	Israel	Andrea Murez^{[a]}
Olympic Selection Time – 2:03.13	1	Macedonia	Anastasia Bogdanovski^{[b]}
Olympic Selection Time – 2:03.13	1	Peru	Andrea Cedrón^{[b]}
Olympic Selection Time – 2:03.13	1	Vietnam	Nguyễn Thị Ánh Viên^{[a]}
Universality Places	1	Fiji	Matelita Buadromo
Universality Places	1	Ghana	Kaya Forson
Universality Places	1	India	Shivani Kataria
Total	44		

==== Women's 400 m freestyle ====
Qualification standard	No. of athletes	NOC	Qualified swimmers
Olympic Qualifying Time – 4:09.08	2	Australia	Jessica Ashwood; Tamsin Cook
Olympic Qualifying Time – 4:09.08	2	Canada	Brittany MacLean; Emily Overholt
Olympic Qualifying Time – 4:09.08	2	China	Cao Yue; Zhang Yuhan
Olympic Qualifying Time – 4:09.08	2	Hungary	Boglárka Kapás; Ajna Késely
Olympic Qualifying Time – 4:09.08	2	Italy	Diletta Carli; Alice Mizzau
Olympic Qualifying Time – 4:09.08	2	Spain	Mireia Belmonte; Melani Costa
Olympic Qualifying Time – 4:09.08	2	United States	Katie Ledecky; Leah Smith
Olympic Qualifying Time – 4:09.08	1	Denmark	Lotte Friis
Olympic Qualifying Time – 4:09.08	1	France	Coralie Balmy
Olympic Qualifying Time – 4:09.08	1	Germany	Sarah Köhler
Olympic Qualifying Time – 4:09.08	1	Great Britain	Jazmin Carlin
Olympic Qualifying Time – 4:09.08	1	Netherlands	Sharon van Rouwendaal
Olympic Qualifying Time – 4:09.08	1	New Zealand	Lauren Boyle
Olympic Qualifying Time – 4:09.08	1	Russia	Arina Openysheva
Olympic Qualifying Time – 4:09.08	1	Slovenia	Anja Klinar
Olympic Qualifying Time – 4:09.08	1	Venezuela	Andreina Pinto
Olympic Qualifying Time – 4:09.08	1	Vietnam	Nguyễn Thị Ánh Viên
Olympic Selection Time – 4:17.80	1	Bahamas	Joanna Evans^{[a]}
Olympic Selection Time – 4:17.80	1	Brazil	Manuella Lyrio^{[a]}
Olympic Selection Time – 4:17.80	1	Chile	Kristel Köbrich^{[a]}
Olympic Selection Time – 4:17.80	1	Guatemala	Valerie Gruest^{[a]}
Olympic Selection Time – 4:17.80	1	Japan	Chihiro Igarashi^{[a]}
Olympic Selection Time – 4:17.80	1	Serbia	Katarina Simonović^{[a]}
Universality Places	1	Barbados	Lani Cabrera
Universality Places	1	El Salvador	Rebeca Quinteros
Universality Places	1	Lebanon	Gabrielle Doueihy
Total	33		

==== Women's 800 m freestyle ====
Qualification standard	No. of athletes	NOC	Qualified swimmers
Olympic Qualifying Time – 8:33.97	2	Australia	Jessica Ashwood; Tamsin Cook
Olympic Qualifying Time – 8:33.97	2	China	Hou Yawen; Zhang Yuhan
Olympic Qualifying Time – 8:33.97	2	Germany	Leonie Beck; Sarah Köhler
Olympic Qualifying Time – 8:33.97	2	Great Britain	Jazmin Carlin; Camilla Hattersley
Olympic Qualifying Time – 8:33.97	2	Hungary	Boglárka Kapás; Éva Risztov
Olympic Qualifying Time – 8:33.97	2	Italy	Diletta Carli; Martina De Memme
Olympic Qualifying Time – 8:33.97	2	New Zealand	Lauren Boyle; Emma Robinson
Olympic Qualifying Time – 8:33.97	2	Slovenia	Anja Klinar; Tjaša Oder
Olympic Qualifying Time – 8:33.97	2	Spain	Mireia Belmonte; María Vilas
Olympic Qualifying Time – 8:33.97	2	United States	Katie Ledecky; Leah Smith
Olympic Qualifying Time – 8:33.97	1	Bahamas	Joanna Evans
Olympic Qualifying Time – 8:33.97	1	Canada	Brittany MacLean
Olympic Qualifying Time – 8:33.97	1	Chile	Kristel Köbrich
Olympic Qualifying Time – 8:33.97	1	Denmark	Lotte Friis
Olympic Qualifying Time – 8:33.97	1	France	Coralie Balmy
Olympic Qualifying Time – 8:33.97	1	Guatemala	Valerie Gruest
Olympic Qualifying Time – 8:33.97	1	Netherlands	Sharon van Rouwendaal
Olympic Qualifying Time – 8:33.97	1	Russia	Arina Openysheva
Olympic Qualifying Time – 8:33.97	1	Venezuela	Andreina Pinto
Olympic Selection Time – 8:51.96	1	Liechtenstein	Julia Hassler^{[b]}
Olympic Selection Time – 8:51.96	1	Portugal	Tamila Holub
Universality Places	1	Ivory Coast	Talita Te Flan
Total	32		

==== Women's 100 m backstroke ====
Qualification standard	No. of athletes	NOC	Qualified swimmers
Olympic Qualifying Time – 1:00.25	2	Australia	Emily Seebohm; Madison Wilson
Olympic Qualifying Time – 1:00.25	2	Canada	Dominique Bouchard; Kylie Masse
Olympic Qualifying Time – 1:00.25	2	China	Fu Yuanhui; Wang Xueer
Olympic Qualifying Time – 1:00.25	2	United States	Kathleen Baker; Olivia Smoliga
Olympic Qualifying Time – 1:00.25	1	Brazil	Etiene Medeiros
Olympic Qualifying Time – 1:00.25	1	Denmark	Mie Nielsen
Olympic Qualifying Time – 1:00.25	1	Great Britain	Georgia Davies
Olympic Qualifying Time – 1:00.25	1	Hungary	Katinka Hosszú
Olympic Qualifying Time – 1:00.25	1	Iceland	Eygló Ósk Gústafsdóttir
Olympic Qualifying Time – 1:00.25	1	Japan	Natsumi Sakai
Olympic Qualifying Time – 1:00.25	1	Netherlands	Kira Toussaint
Olympic Qualifying Time – 1:00.25	1	Russia	Anastasia Fesikova
Olympic Qualifying Time – 1:00.25	1	Slovakia	Katarína Listopadová
Olympic Qualifying Time – 1:00.25	1	Ukraine	Daryna Zevina
Olympic Qualifying Time – 1:00.25	1	Zimbabwe	Kirsty Coventry
Olympic Selection Time – 1.02.36	1	Croatia	Matea Samardžić^{[a]}
Olympic Selection Time – 1.02.36	1	Czech Republic	Simona Baumrtová^{[a]}
Olympic Selection Time – 1.02.36	1	Finland	Mimosa Jallow
Olympic Selection Time – 1.02.36	1	Hong Kong	Claudia Lau^{[a]}
Olympic Selection Time – 1.02.36	1	Israel	Andrea Murez^{[a]}
Olympic Selection Time – 1.02.36	1	Kazakhstan	Yekaterina Rudenko^{[b]}
Olympic Selection Time – 1.02.36	1	Poland	Alicja Tchorz^{[a]}
Olympic Selection Time – 1.02.36	1	Seychelles	Alexus Laird^{[b]}
Olympic Selection Time – 1.02.36	1	Spain	Duane da Rocha^{[a]}
Olympic Selection Time – 1.02.36	1	Sweden	Michelle Coleman^{[a]}
Universality Places	1	Cayman Islands	Lara Butler
Universality Places	1	Kenya	Talisa Lanoe
Universality Places	1	Kosovo	Rita Zeqiri
Universality Places	1	Nepal	Gaurika Singh
Universality Places	1	Samoa	Evelina Afoa
Universality Places	1	Sri Lanka	Kimiko Raheem
Universality Places	1	Virgin Islands	Caylee Watson
Total	36		

==== Women's 200 m backstroke ====
Qualification standard	No. of athletes	NOC	Qualified swimmers
Olympic Qualifying Time – 2:10.60	2	Australia	Belinda Hocking; Emily Seebohm
Olympic Qualifying Time – 2:10.60	2	Canada	Dominique Bouchard; Hilary Caldwell
Olympic Qualifying Time – 2:10.60	2	China	Chen Jie; Liu Yaxin
Olympic Qualifying Time – 2:10.60	2	Germany	Lisa Graf; Jenny Mensing
Olympic Qualifying Time – 2:10.60	2	Hungary	Réka György; Katinka Hosszú
Olympic Qualifying Time – 2:10.60	2	Spain	Duane da Rocha; África Zamorano
Olympic Qualifying Time – 2:10.60	2	United States	Maya DiRado; Missy Franklin
Olympic Qualifying Time – 2:10.60	1	Croatia	Matea Samardžić
Olympic Qualifying Time – 2:10.60	1	Czech Republic	Simona Baumrtová
Olympic Qualifying Time – 2:10.60	1	Hong Kong	Claudia Lau
Olympic Qualifying Time – 2:10.60	1	Iceland	Eygló Ósk Gústafsdóttir
Olympic Qualifying Time – 2:10.60	1	Italy	Margherita Panziera
Olympic Qualifying Time – 2:10.60	1	Japan	Natsumi Sakai
Olympic Qualifying Time – 2:10.60	1	Poland	Alicja Tchórz
Olympic Qualifying Time – 2:10.60	1	Russia	Anastasia Fesikova
Olympic Qualifying Time – 2:10.60	1	Ukraine	Daryna Zevina
Olympic Qualifying Time – 2:10.60	1	Zimbabwe	Kirsty Coventry
Olympic Selection Time – 2:15.17	1	Switzerland	Martina van Berkel
Olympic Selection Time – 2:15.17	1	Turkey	Ekaterina Avramova
Universality Places	1	Indonesia	Yessy Yosaputra
Total	27		

==== Women's 100 m breaststroke ====
Qualification standard	No. of athletes	NOC	Qualified swimmers
Olympic Qualifying Time – 1:07.85	2	Australia	Georgia Bohl; Taylor McKeown
Olympic Qualifying Time – 1:07.85	2	Canada	Rachel Nicol; Kierra Smith
Olympic Qualifying Time – 1:07.85	2	China	Shi Jinglin; Zhang Xinyu
Olympic Qualifying Time – 1:07.85	2	Great Britain	Molly Renshaw; Chloe Tutton
Olympic Qualifying Time – 1:07.85	2	Italy	Martina Carraro; Arianna Castiglioni
Olympic Qualifying Time – 1:07.85	2	Japan	Satomi Suzuki; Kanako Watanabe
Olympic Qualifying Time – 1:07.85	2	Sweden	Sophie Hansson; Jennie Johansson
Olympic Qualifying Time – 1:07.85	2	United States	Lilly King; Katie Meili
Olympic Qualifying Time – 1:07.85	1	Belgium	Fanny Lecluyse
Olympic Qualifying Time – 1:07.85	1	Denmark	Rikke Møller Pedersen
Olympic Qualifying Time – 1:07.85	1	Finland	Jenna Laukkanen
Olympic Qualifying Time – 1:07.85	1	Hong Kong	Yvette Kong
Olympic Qualifying Time – 1:07.85	1	Iceland	Hrafnhildur Lúthersdóttir
Olympic Qualifying Time – 1:07.85	1	Ireland	Fiona Doyle
Olympic Qualifying Time – 1:07.85	1	Israel	Amit Ivry
Olympic Qualifying Time – 1:07.85	1	Jamaica	Alia Atkinson
Olympic Qualifying Time – 1:07.85	1	Lithuania	Rūta Meilutytė
Olympic Qualifying Time – 1:07.85	1	Spain	Jessica Vall
Olympic Qualifying Time – 1:07.85	1	Russia	Daria Chikunova
Olympic Qualifying Time – 1:07.85	1	Turkey	Zeynep Güneş
Olympic Selection Time – 1:10.22	1	Czech Republic	Martina Moravčíková^{[a]}
Olympic Selection Time – 1:10.22	1	Estonia	Maria Romanjuk^{[b]}
Olympic Selection Time – 1:10.22	1	Hungary	Anna Sztankovics^{[a]}
Olympic Selection Time – 1:10.22	1	Malaysia	Phee Jinq En^{[b]}
Olympic Selection Time – 1:10.22	1	Moldova	Tatiana Chişca^{[b]}
Olympic Selection Time – 1:10.22	1	Slovenia	Tjaša Vozel
Universality Places	1	Georgia	Teona Bostashvili
Universality Places	1	Guam	Pilar Shimizu
Universality Places	1	Kyrgyzstan	Dariya Talanova
Universality Places	1	Libya	Daniah Hagul
Universality Places	1	Nigeria	Rechael Tonjor
Universality Places	1	Saint Vincent and the Grenadines	Izzy Joachim
Universality Places	1	Suriname	Evita Leter
Universality Places	1	Turkmenistan	Darya Semyonova
Universality Places	1	Uganda	Jamila Lunkuse
Total	43		

==== Women's 200 m breaststroke ====
Qualification standard	No. of athletes	NOC	Qualified swimmers
Olympic Qualifying Time – 2:26.94	2	Australia	Georgia Bohl; Taylor McKeown
Olympic Qualifying Time – 2:26.94	2	Canada	Kierra Smith; Martha McCabe
Olympic Qualifying Time – 2:26.94	2	China	Shi Jinglin; Yu Jingyao
Olympic Qualifying Time – 2:26.94	2	Great Britain	Molly Renshaw; Chloe Tutton
Olympic Qualifying Time – 2:26.94	2	Hungary	Dalma Sebestyén; Anna Sztankovics
Olympic Qualifying Time – 2:26.94	2	Japan	Rie Kaneto; Kanako Watanabe
Olympic Qualifying Time – 2:26.94	2	United States	Lilly King; Molly Hannis
Olympic Qualifying Time – 2:26.94	1	Belgium	Fanny Lecluyse
Olympic Qualifying Time – 2:26.94	1	Czech Republic	Martina Moravčíková
Olympic Qualifying Time – 2:26.94	1	Denmark	Rikke Møller Pedersen
Olympic Qualifying Time – 2:26.94	1	Finland	Jenna Laukkanen
Olympic Qualifying Time – 2:26.94	1	Iceland	Hrafnhildur Lúthersdóttir
Olympic Qualifying Time – 2:26.94	1	South Korea	Back Su-yeon
Olympic Qualifying Time – 2:26.94	1	Spain	Jessica Vall
Olympic Qualifying Time – 2:26.94	1	Russia	Sofiya Andreeva
Olympic Qualifying Time – 2:26.94	1	Turkey	Zeynep Güneş
Olympic Selection Time – 2:32.08	1	Argentina	Julia Sebastián
Olympic Selection Time – 2:32.08	1	Hong Kong	Yvette Kong^{[a]}
Olympic Selection Time – 2:32.08	1	Ireland	Fiona Doyle^{[a]}
Olympic Selection Time – 2:32.08	1	Israel	Amit Ivry^{[a]}
Olympic Selection Time – 2:32.08	1	Sweden	Sophie Hansson^{[a]}
Universality Places	1	Latvia	Aļona Ribakova
Total	29		

==== Women's 100 m butterfly ====
Qualification standard	No. of athletes	NOC	Qualified swimmers
Olympic Qualifying Time – 58.74	2	Australia	Madeline Groves; Emma McKeon
Olympic Qualifying Time – 58.74	2	Brazil	Daynara de Paula; Daiene Dias
Olympic Qualifying Time – 58.74	2	Canada	Penny Oleksiak; Noemie Thomas
Olympic Qualifying Time – 58.74	2	China	Chen Xinyi; Lu Ying
Olympic Qualifying Time – 58.74	2	France	Béryl Gastaldello; Marie Wattel
Olympic Qualifying Time – 58.74	2	Greece	Anna Ntountounaki; Kristel Vourna*
Olympic Qualifying Time – 58.74	2	Japan	Natsumi Hoshi; Rikako Ikee
Olympic Qualifying Time – 58.74	2	Russia	Svetlana Chimrova; Natalya Lovtsova
Olympic Qualifying Time – 58.74	2	Sweden	Louise Hansson; Sarah Sjöström
Olympic Qualifying Time – 58.74	2	United States	Kelsi Worrell; Dana Vollmer
Olympic Qualifying Time – 58.74	1	Belgium	Kimberly Buys
Olympic Qualifying Time – 58.74	1	Czech Republic	Lucie Svěcená
Olympic Qualifying Time – 58.74	1	Denmark	Jeanette Ottesen
Olympic Qualifying Time – 58.74	1	Egypt	Farida Osman
Olympic Qualifying Time – 58.74	1	Germany	Alexandra Wenk
Olympic Qualifying Time – 58.74	1	Hungary	Liliána Szilágyi
Olympic Qualifying Time – 58.74	1	Italy	Ilaria Bianchi
Olympic Qualifying Time – 58.74	1	New Zealand	Helena Gasson
Olympic Qualifying Time – 58.74	1	Slovakia	Katarína Listopadová
Olympic Qualifying Time – 58.74	1	South Korea	An Se-hyeon
Olympic Qualifying Time – 58.74	1	Spain	Judit Ignacio
Olympic Selection Time – 1:00.80	1	Bahamas	Arianna Vanderpool-Wallace^{[a]}
Olympic Selection Time – 1:00.80	1	Israel	Amit Ivry^{[a]}
Olympic Selection Time – 1:00.80	1	Singapore	Quah Ting Wen^{[b]}
Olympic Selection Time – 1:00.80	1	Switzerland	Danielle Villars
Olympic Selection Time – 1:00.80	1	Ukraine	Darya Stepanyuk^{[a]}
Universality Places	1	Bosnia and Herzegovina	Amina Kajtaz
Universality Places	1	Costa Rica	Marie Laura Meza
Universality Places	1	Cyprus	Sotiria Neofytou
Universality Places	1	Grenada	Oreoluwa Cherebin
Universality Places	1	Mozambique	Jannah Sonnenschein
Universality Places	1	Nicaragua	Dalia Torrez Zamora
Universality Places	1	Qatar	Nada Arkaji
Universality Places	1	Refugee Olympic Team	Yusra Mardini
Universality Places	1	Rwanda	Johanna Umurungi
Universality Places	1	Yemen	Nooran Ba Matraf
Total	46		

==== Women's 200 m butterfly ====
Qualification standard	No. of athletes	NOC	Qualified swimmers
Olympic Qualifying Time – 2:09.33	2	Australia	Madeline Groves; Brianna Throssell
Olympic Qualifying Time – 2:09.33	2	China	Zhang Yufei; Zhou Yilin
Olympic Qualifying Time – 2:09.33	2	Hungary	Katinka Hosszú; Liliána Szilágyi
Olympic Qualifying Time – 2:09.33	2	Italy	Alessia Polieri; Stefania Pirozzi
Olympic Qualifying Time – 2:09.33	2	Japan	Suzuka Hasegawa; Natsumi Hoshi
Olympic Qualifying Time – 2:09.33	2	South Korea	An Se-hyeon; Park Jin-young
Olympic Qualifying Time – 2:09.33	2	Spain	Mireia Belmonte; Judit Ignacio
Olympic Qualifying Time – 2:09.33	2	United States	Cammile Adams; Hali Flickinger
Olympic Qualifying Time – 2:09.33	1	Canada	Audrey Lacroix
Olympic Qualifying Time – 2:09.33	1	France	Lara Grangeon
Olympic Qualifying Time – 2:09.33	1	Germany	Franziska Hentke
Olympic Qualifying Time – 2:09.33	1	Great Britain	Aimee Willmott
Olympic Qualifying Time – 2:09.33	1	Slovenia	Anja Klinar
Olympic Qualifying Time – 2:09.33	1	Switzerland	Martina van Berkel
Olympic Selection Time – 2:13.86	1	Argentina	Virginia Bardach^{[a]}
Olympic Selection Time – 2:13.86	1	Brazil	Joanna Melo^{[a]}
Olympic Selection Time – 2:13.86	1	New Zealand	Helena Gasson^{[a]}
Olympic Selection Time – 2:13.86	1	Turkey	Nida Eliz Üstündağ
Olympic Selection Time – 2:13.86	1	Venezuela	Andreina Pinto^{[a]}
Universality Places	1	Panama	María Far Núñez
Total	28		

==== Women's 200 m individual medley ====
Qualification standard	No. of athletes	NOC	Qualified swimmers
Olympic Qualifying Time – 2:14.26	2	Australia	Alicia Coutts; Kotuku Ngawati
Olympic Qualifying Time – 2:14.26	2	Austria	Lena Kreundl; Lisa Zaiser
Olympic Qualifying Time – 2:14.26	2	Canada	Sydney Pickrem; Erika Seltenreich-Hodgson
Olympic Qualifying Time – 2:14.26	2	China	Ye Shiwen; Zhou Min
Olympic Qualifying Time – 2:14.26	2	Czech Republic	Simona Baumrtová; Barbora Závadová
Olympic Qualifying Time – 2:14.26	1	Great Britain	Hannah Miley; Siobhan-Marie O'Connor
Olympic Qualifying Time – 2:14.26	2	Hungary	Katinka Hosszú; Zsuzsanna Jakabos
Olympic Qualifying Time – 2:14.26	2	Italy	Sara Franceschi; Luisa Trombetti
Olympic Qualifying Time – 2:14.26	2	Japan	Runa Imai; Miho Teramura
Olympic Qualifying Time – 2:14.26	2	South Korea	Kim Seo-yeong; Nam Yoo-sun
Olympic Qualifying Time – 2:14.26	2	Spain	Mireia Belmonte; África Zamorano
Olympic Qualifying Time – 2:14.26	2	Sweden	Stina Gardell; Louise Hansson
Olympic Qualifying Time – 2:14.26	2	United States	Maya DiRado; Melanie Margalis
Olympic Qualifying Time – 2:14.26	1	Argentina	Virginia Bardach
Olympic Qualifying Time – 2:14.26	1	Brazil	Joanna Melo
Olympic Qualifying Time – 2:14.26	1	Finland	Tanja Kylliäinen
Olympic Qualifying Time – 2:14.26	1	France	Lara Grangeon
Olympic Qualifying Time – 2:14.26	1	Germany	Alexandra Wenk
Olympic Qualifying Time – 2:14.26	1	Hong Kong	Siobhán Haughey
Olympic Qualifying Time – 2:14.26	1	Iceland	Hrafnhildur Lúthersdóttir
Olympic Qualifying Time – 2:14.26	1	Netherlands	Marrit Steenbergen
Olympic Qualifying Time – 2:14.26	1	Russia	Viktoriya Andreeva
Olympic Qualifying Time – 2:14.26	1	Switzerland	Maria Ugolkova
Olympic Qualifying Time – 2:14.26	1	Uzbekistan	Ranohon Amanova
Olympic Qualifying Time – 2:14.26	1	Vietnam	Nguyễn Thị Ánh Viên
Olympic Selection Time – 2:18.96	1	Israel	Amit Ivry^{[a]}
Olympic Selection Time – 2:18.96	1	Poland	Katarzyna Baranowska
Olympic Selection Time – 2:18.96	1	Portugal	Victoria Kaminskaya^{[a]}
Olympic Selection Time – 2:18.96	1	Serbia	Anja Crevar^{[a]}
Universality Places	0	—	—
Total	43		

==== Women's 400 m individual medley ====
Qualification standard	No. of athletes	NOC	Qualified swimmers
Olympic Qualifying Time – 4:43.46	2	Australia	Blair Evans; Keryn McMaster
Olympic Qualifying Time – 4:43.46	2	Canada	Emily Overholt; Sydney Pickrem
Olympic Qualifying Time – 4:43.46	2	China	Ye Shiwen; Zhou Min
Olympic Qualifying Time – 4:43.46	2	France	Lara Grangeon; Fantine Lesaffre
Olympic Qualifying Time – 4:43.46	2	Great Britain	Hannah Miley; Aimee Willmott
Olympic Qualifying Time – 4:43.46	2	Hungary	Katinka Hosszú; Zsuzsanna Jakabos
Olympic Qualifying Time – 4:43.46	2	Italy	Sara Franceschi; Luisa Trombetti
Olympic Qualifying Time – 4:43.46	2	Japan	Sakiko Shimizu; Miho Takahashi
Olympic Qualifying Time – 4:43.46	2	Spain	Mireia Belmonte; María Vilas
Olympic Qualifying Time – 4:43.46	2	United States	Elizabeth Beisel; Maya DiRado
Olympic Qualifying Time – 4:43.46	1	Argentina	Virginia Bardach
Olympic Qualifying Time – 4:43.46	1	Brazil	Joanna Melo
Olympic Qualifying Time – 4:43.46	1	Czech Republic	Barbora Závadová
Olympic Qualifying Time – 4:43.46	1	Germany	Franziska Hentke
Olympic Qualifying Time – 4:43.46	1	Portugal	Victoria Kaminskaya
Olympic Qualifying Time – 4:43.46	1	Serbia	Anja Crevar
Olympic Qualifying Time – 4:43.46	1	Slovenia	Anja Klinar
Olympic Qualifying Time – 4:43.46	1	Turkey	Zeynep Güneş
Olympic Qualifying Time – 4:43.46	1	Uzbekistan	Ranohon Amanova
Olympic Qualifying Time – 4:43.46	1	Vietnam	Nguyễn Thị Ánh Viên
Olympic Selection Time – 4:53.68	1	Austria	Jördis Steinegger
Olympic Selection Time – 4:53.68	1	Croatia	Matea Samardžić^{[a]}
Olympic Selection Time – 4:53.68	1	Finland	Tanja Kylliäinen^{[a]}
Olympic Selection Time – 4:53.68	1	Switzerland	Martina van Berkel^{[a]}
Universality Places	0	—	—
Total	34		

== Relay events ==
=== Men's 4 × 100 m freestyle relay ===
Qualification event	No. of teams	Qualified teams
2015 World Championships	11	Russia; Brazil; Italy; France; Japan; Canada; Poland; China; Belgium; Germany; United States
Best times of non-qualifiers	5	Australia; Greece; Romania; Hungary; Spain
Total	16	

=== Men's 4 × 200 m freestyle relay ===
Qualification event	No. of teams	Qualified teams
2015 World Championships	12	Australia; United States; Great Britain; Germany; Poland; Netherlands; Russia; Belgium; Spain; Japan; France; Denmark
Best times of non-qualifiers	4	Italy; Brazil; Hungary; South Africa
Total	16	

=== Men's 4 × 100 m medley relay ===
Qualification event	No. of teams	Qualified teams
2015 World Championships	12	United States; Australia; France; Japan; Germany; Great Britain; Poland; Russia; Italy; Brazil; China; Lithuania
Best times of non-qualifiers	4	South Africa; Hungary; Canada; Greece
Total	16	

=== Women's 4 × 100 m freestyle relay ===
Qualification event	No. of teams	Qualified teams
2015 World Championships	12	Australia; Netherlands; United States; Sweden; Canada; China; Italy; France; Japan; Russia; Brazil; Poland
Best times of non-qualifiers	4	Denmark; Spain; Switzerland; Israel
Total	16	

=== Women's 4 × 200 m freestyle relay ===
Qualification event	No. of teams	Qualified teams
2015 World Championships	12	Italy; United States; Australia; Sweden; China; Japan; Great Britain; France; Russia; Brazil; Canada; Germany
Best times of non-qualifiers	4	Hungary; Netherlands; Spain; Slovenia
Total	16	

=== Women's 4 × 100 m medley relay ===
Qualification event	No. of teams	Qualified teams
2015 World Championships	12	China; United States; Sweden; Australia; Denmark; Canada; Italy; Russia; Germany; France; Great Britain; Japan
Best times of non-qualifiers	4	Finland; Brazil; Czech Republic; Hong Kong
Total	16	

== Notes ==
a.	Qualified in other events
b.	Under universality place, but reached the Olympic Selection Time
