= Swimming at the 2015 World Aquatics Championships – Men's 50 metre freestyle =

Men's 50 metre freestyle at the 2015 World Aquatics Championships
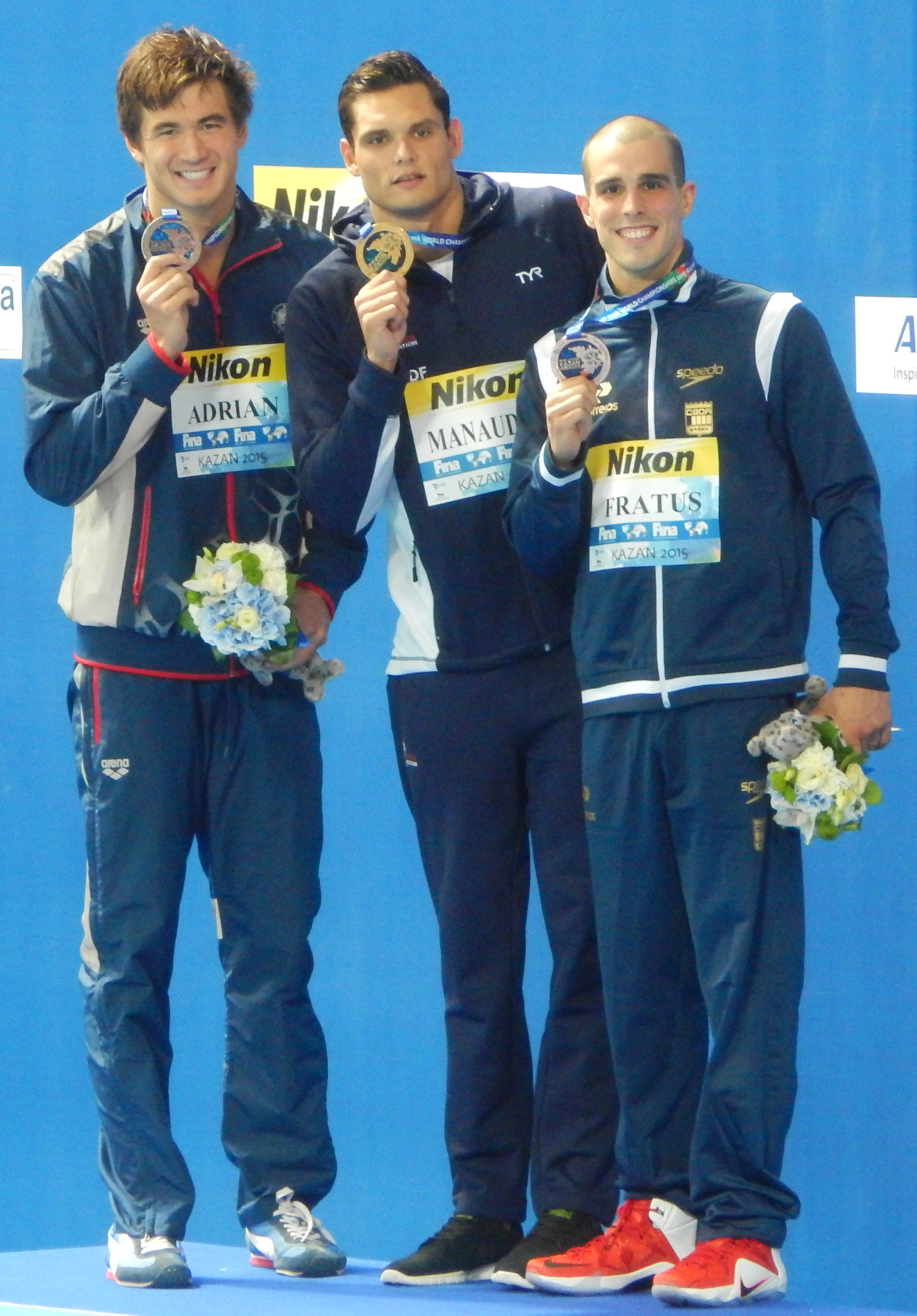
- Victory Ceremony
- Dates: 7 August (heats and semifinals); 8 August (final)
- Competitors: 115 from 105 nations
- Winning time: 21.19

Medalists
gold medal	Florent Manaudou	France
silver medal	Nathan Adrian	United States
bronze medal	Bruno Fratus	Brazil

The men's 50 metre freestyle competition of the swimming events at the 2015 World Aquatics Championships was held on 7 August with the heats and the semifinals and 8 August with the final.

Despite losing lane four to American Nathan Adrian, France's Florent Manaudou threw down a personal and textile best of 21.19 to win his first World Championship in the event, holding off Adrian and Brazilian Bruno Fratus by over three-tenths of a second, an enormous margin in swimming's shortest race. Adrian grabbed the silver in 21.52, following up a new American Record of 21.37 achieved earlier in the semifinals. Fratus took home the bronze, his first World Championship medal ever, in 21.55. Vladimir Morozov, the defending silver medalist from Barcelona, missed the podium in fourth place by a fingertip in 21.56. Ukraine's Andriy Hovorov and Italy's Marco Orsi tied for fifth in 21.86, while Greece's Kristian Golomeev, the defending NCAA 100 freestyle champion, took seventh in 21.98. Great Britain's Benjamin Proud finished eight in 22.04 to round out the championship final.

Plagued by injury, Brazil's defending World Champion César Cielo scratched the event. Other notable swimmers included China's Ning Zetao (22.18) and American Anthony Ervin (22.02), who both missed the championship final.

== Records ==
Prior to the competition, the existing world and championship records were as follows.

World record	César Cielo (BRA)	20.91	São Paulo, Brazil	18 December 2009
Competition record	César Cielo (BRA)	21.08	Rome, Italy	1 August 2009

== Results ==
=== Heats ===
The heats were held at 09:30.

Rank	Heat	Lane	Name	Nationality	Time	Notes
1	12	4	Florent Manaudou	France	21.71	Q
2	11	2	Nathan Adrian	United States	21.73	Q
3	12	2	Kristian Golomeev	Greece	21.87	Q, NR
4	12	5	Vladimir Morozov	Russia	21.97	Q
5	11	5	Bruno Fratus	Brazil	22.01	Q
6	10	4	Marco Orsi	Italy	22.03	Q
7	10	5	Ben Proud	Great Britain	22.13	Q
8	10	3	Krisztián Takács	Hungary	22.21	Q
9	11	7	Andriy Hovorov	Ukraine	22.23	Q
10	12	6	Katsumi Nakamura	Japan	22.25	Q
11	11	3	Matthew Abood	Australia	22.28	Q
12	10	7	Shinri Shioura	Japan	22.34	Q
13	12	7	Andrey Grechin	Russia	22.38	Q
14	10	6	Ning Zetao	China	22.43	Q
15	11	4	Anthony Ervin	United States	22.44	Q
16	12	8	Odysseus Meladinis	Greece	22.47	Q
17	10	1	François Heersbrandt	Belgium	22.48	
17	11	1	Luca Dotto	Italy	22.48	
19	12	1	Clément Mignon	France	22.50	
20	10	2	Yu Hexin	China	22.51	
20	10	0	Simonas Bilis	Lithuania	22.51	
22	11	6	Ari-Pekka Liukkonen	Finland	22.54	
23	9	6	Christoffer Carlsen	Sweden	22.61	
24	12	9	Marius Radu	Romania	22.65	
25	10	9	Miguel Ortiz-Cañavate	Spain	22.66	
25	11	0	Renzo Tjon A Joe	Suriname	22.66	
27	9	0	Anton Latkin	Belarus	22.67	
27	11	8	Jasper Aerents	Belgium	22.67	
29	9	5	Geoffrey Cheah	Hong Kong	22.68	
30	9	8	Mario Todorović	Croatia	22.71	
31	9	3	Boris Stojanović	Serbia	22.81	
32	11	9	Dylan Carter	Trinidad and Tobago	22.82	
33	9	7	Ali Khalafalla	Egypt	22.88	
33	10	8	Karl Krug	Canada	22.88	
35	8	5	Sidni Hoxha	Albania	22.93	
36	9	1	Cristian Quintero	Venezuela	22.94	
37	8	2	Julien Henx	Luxembourg	22.97	
38	8	3	Virdhawal Khade	India	23.01	
39	8	0	Elvis Burrows	Bahamas	23.06	
40	9	2	Demir Atasoy	Turkey	23.16	
41	8	1	Oliver Elliot	Chile	23.29	
41	9	9	Luís Flores	Puerto Rico	23.29	
43	8	7	Jordan Augier	Saint Lucia	23.30	
44	7	2	Vahan Mkhitaryan	Armenia	23.36	
45	12	0	Alejandro Escudero	Mexico	23.38	
46	8	8	Andrew Chetcuti	Malta	23.43	
47	7	6	Sam Seghers	Papua New Guinea	23.46	
48	7	7	Allan Gutiérrez	Honduras	23.47	
49	8	6	Mohammad Madwa	Kuwait	23.50	
50	7	5	Maksim Inić	Montenegro	23.54	
51	8	4	Gabriel Melconian Alvez	Uruguay	23.73	
52	8	9	Meli Malani	Fiji	23.78	
53	7	9	Jagger Stephens	Guam	23.84	
54	5	5	Ahmad Attellesey	Libya	23.89	
54	7	8	Mikel Schreuders	Aruba	23.89	
56	6	4	Thibaut Danho	Ivory Coast	23.91	
57	7	4	Stanislav Karnaukhov	Kyrgyzstan	23.92	
58	6	3	Jhonny Pérez	Dominican Republic	24.11	
59	6	2	Sidrell Williams	Jamaica	24.15	
60	6	6	Abdoul Niane	Senegal	24.18	
61	6	0	José Alberto Quintanilla	Bolivia	24.19	
62	7	0	Miguel Mena	Nicaragua	24.25	
63	7	3	Anthony Barbar	Lebanon	24.31	
64	6	7	Cherantha de Silva	FINA Independent Athletes	24.32	
65	4	6	Mahfizur Rahman Sagor	Bangladesh	24.43	
66	6	9	João Aguiar	Angola	24.44	
67	5	2	Christian Nikles	Brunei	24.55	NR
68	6	5	Issa Mohamed	Kenya	24.56	
69	5	3	Denilson da Costa	Mozambique	24.66	
70	5	9	Abeiku Jackson	Ghana	24.72	
71	4	3	Noah Mascoll-Gomes	Antigua and Barbuda	24.79	
72	5	0	Hilal Hemed Hilal	Tanzania	24.86	
73	5	7	Alex Sobers	Barbados	24.87	
74	5	1	Lum Zhaveli	Kosovo	24.91	
75	5	4	Farhan Saleh	Bahrain	24.98	
76	6	1	Samson Opuakpo	Nigeria	25.02	
77	4	4	Valentin Gorshkov	Turkmenistan	25.07	
78	4	5	Kerry Ollivierre	Grenada	25.37	
79	5	8	Batsaikhany Dulguun	Mongolia	25.42	
80	4	2	Joshua Tibatemwa	Uganda	25.54	NR
81	5	6	Mohammad Abdo	Palestine	25.84	
82	3	3	Andrew Fowler	Guyana	26.03	
83	4	7	Giordan Harris	Marshall Islands	26.18	
84	4	8	Muhammad Saad	Pakistan	26.19	
85	1	5	Mamadou Soumaré	Mali	26.41	
86	3	2	Billy-Scott Irakose	Burundi	26.50	
87	3	5	Olim Qurbonov	Tajikistan	26.64	
88	3	8	Shane Cadogan	Saint Vincent and the Grenadines	26.70	
89	3	4	Ibrahim Nishwan	Maldives	26.76	
90	3	6	Dionisio Augustine	Federated States of Micronesia	26.92	
91	1	3	Amadou Camara	Guinea	26.99	
92	2	4	Shawn Dingilius-Wallace	Palau	27.02	
93	3	7	Mohamed Adnan	Maldives	27.17	
94	1	4	Pap Jonga	The Gambia	27.24	
94	3	9	Jules Bessan	Benin	27.24	
96	2	5	Takumi Sugie	Northern Mariana Islands	27.26	
97	6	8	Athoumane Soilihi	Comoros	27.34	
98	2	7	Santisouk Inthavong	Laos	27.42	
99	4	1	Sirish Gurung	Nepal	27.45	
100	1	2	Ebrahim Al-Maleki	Yemen	27.55	
101	2	3	Albachir Mouctar	Niger	27.57	
102	3	0	Hemthon Ponloeu	Cambodia	27.63	
103	2	0	Osman Kamara	Sierra Leone	27.70	
104	2	2	Patrick Rukundo	Rwanda	27.75	
105	2	1	Abdelaziz Ahmed	Sudan	27.88	
106	2	8	Eméric Kpegba	Togo	28.29	
107	3	1	Tindwende Sawadogo	Burkina Faso	28.39	
108	1	9	Dienov Andres Koka	Congo	28.53	
109	2	6	Brave Lifa	Malawi	29.07	
110	2	9	Mael Ambonguilat	Gabon	29.25	
111	1	0	Ahmed Alwan	Djibouti	30.77	
112	1	7	Frantz Dorsainvil	Haiti	31.93	
113	1	8	Mokhoro Makara	Lesotho	55.80	
	1	1	Shad Perriere	Central African Republic		DNS
	1	6	Charly Ndjoume	Cameroon		DNS
	7	1	Lorenzo Loria	Mexico		DNS
	9	4	Pjotr Degtjarjov	Estonia		DNS
	12	3	César Cielo	Brazil		DNS
	4	0	Abdelmalik Muktar	Ethiopia		DSQ
	4	9	Temaruata Strickland	Cook Islands		DSQ

=== Semifinals ===
The semifinals were held at 18.09.

==== Semifinal 1 ====
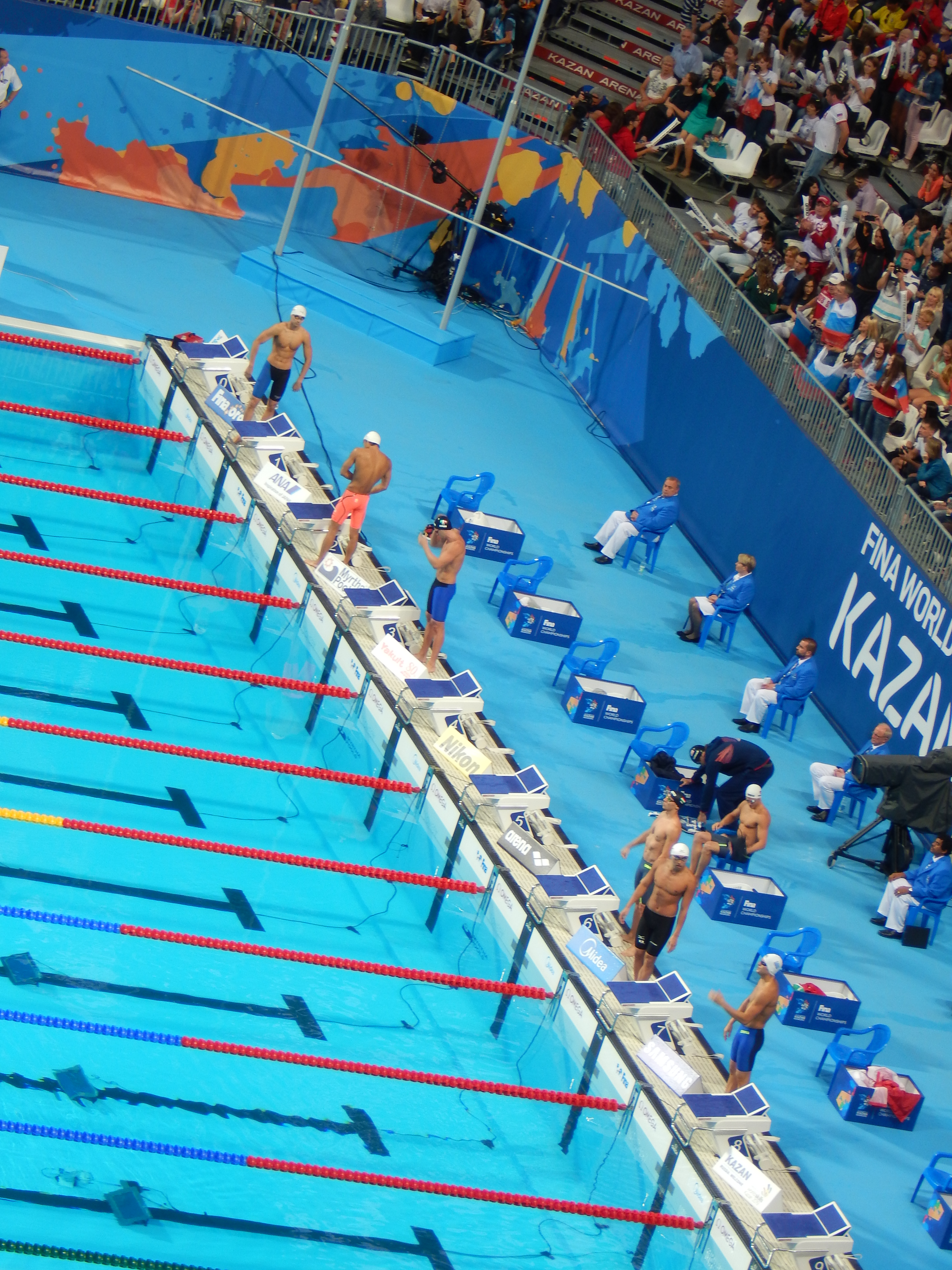
First semi

Rank	Lane	Name	Nationality	Time	Notes
1	4	Nathan Adrian	United States	21.37	Q, NR
2	3	Marco Orsi	Italy	21.86	Q
3	5	Vladimir Morozov	Russia	22.02	QSO
4	6	Krisztián Takács	Hungary	22.07	
5	7	Shinri Shioura	Japan	22.08	
6	8	Odysseus Meladinis	Greece	22.14	
7	2	Katsumi Nakamura	Japan	22.15	
8	1	Ning Zetao	China	22.28	

==== Semifinal 2 ====
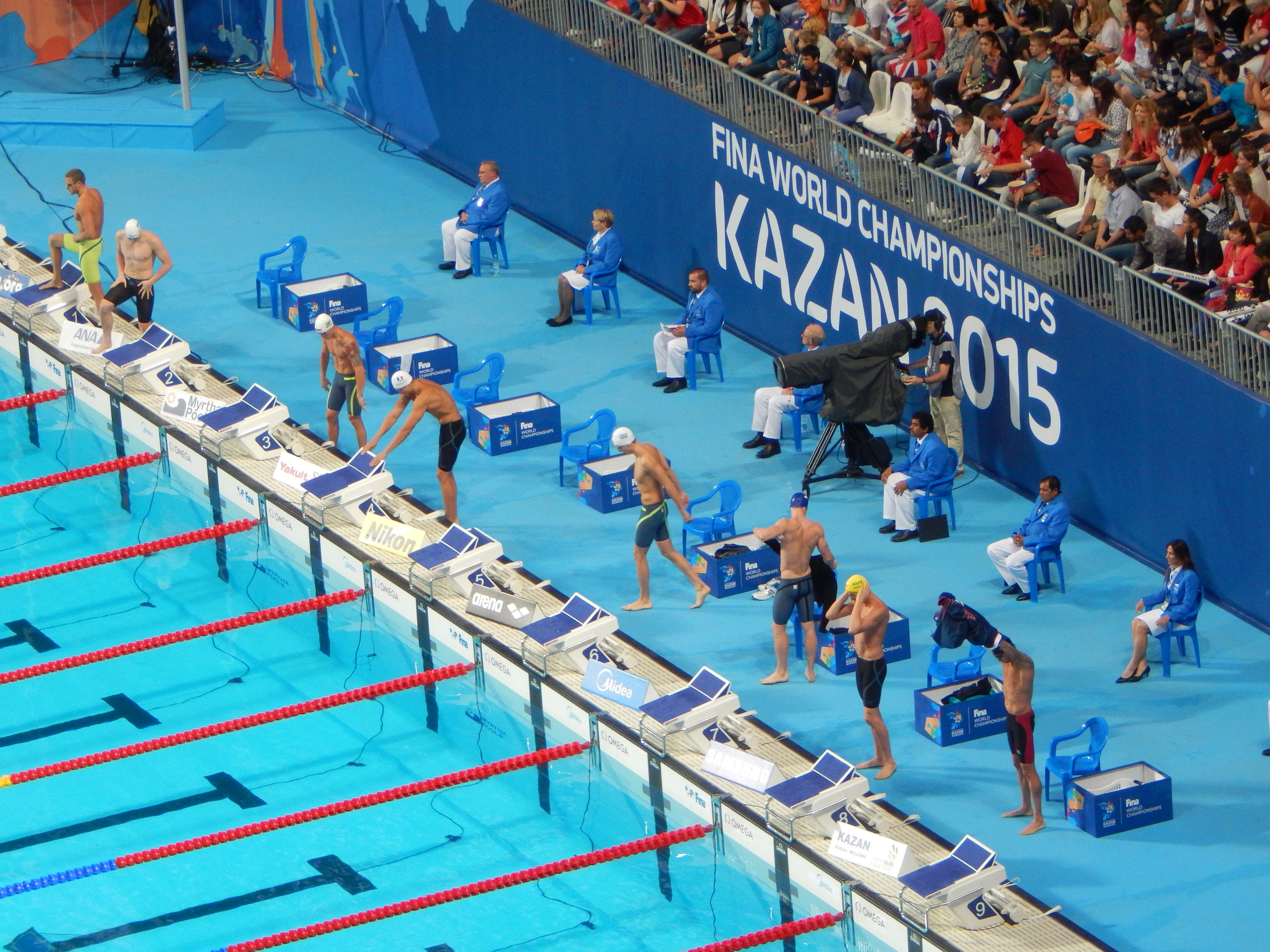
Second semi

Rank	Lane	Name	Nationality	Time	Notes
1	4	Florent Manaudou	France	21.41	Q
2	3	Bruno Fratus	Brazil	21.60	Q
3	6	Benjamin Proud	Great Britain	21.88	Q
4	5	Kristian Golomeev	Greece	21.89	Q
5	2	Andriy Hovorov	Ukraine	21.93	Q
6	8	Anthony Ervin	United States	22.02	QSO
7	7	Matthew Abood	Australia	22.16	
8	1	Andrey Grechin	Russia	22.66	

==== Swim-off ====
The swim-off was held at 19:38.

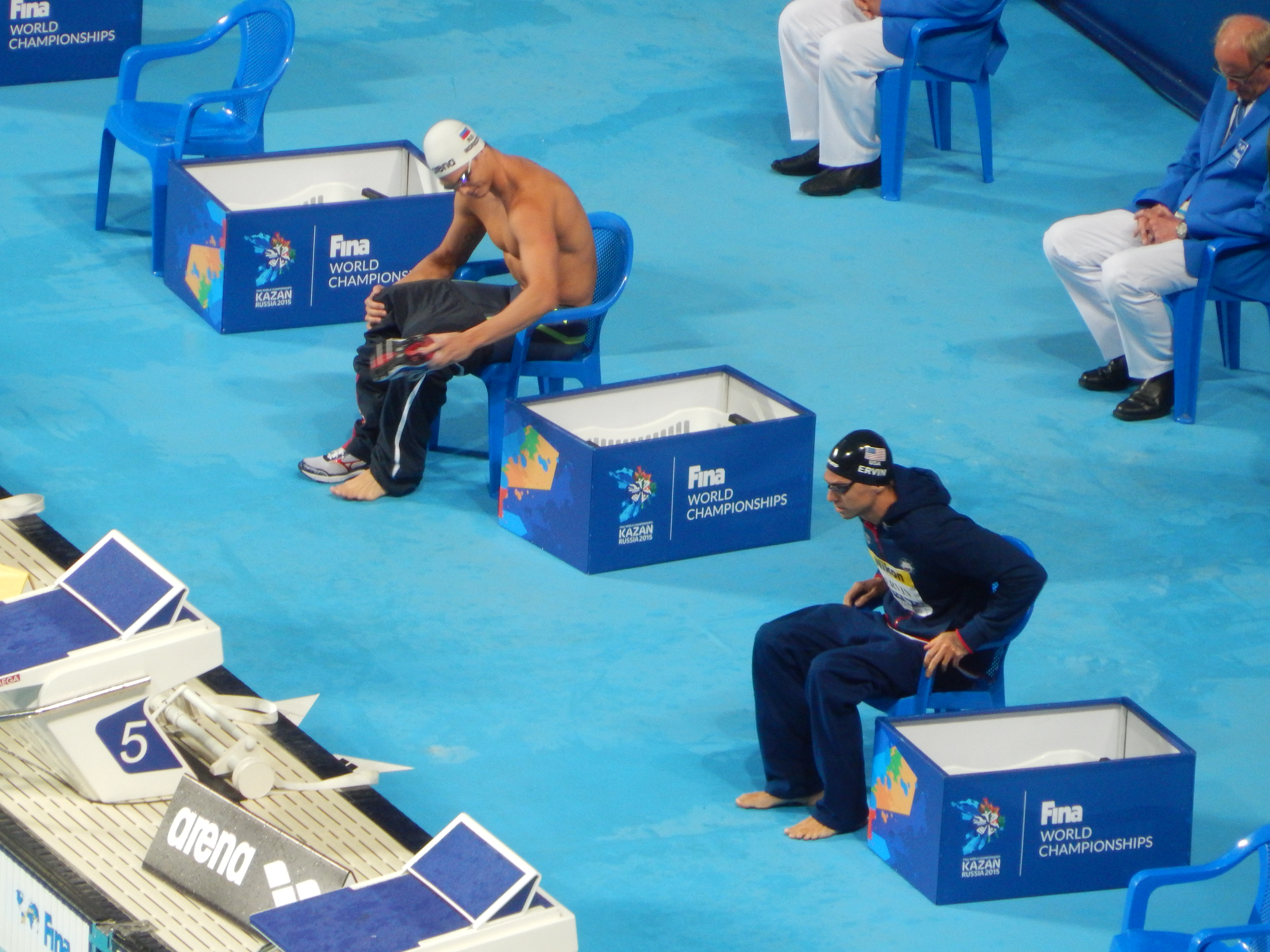
Before the swim-off

Rank	Lane	Name	Nationality	Time	Notes
1	4	Vladimir Morozov	Russia	21.90	Q
2	5	Anthony Ervin	United States	21.98	

=== Final ===
The final was held on 8 August at 17:39.

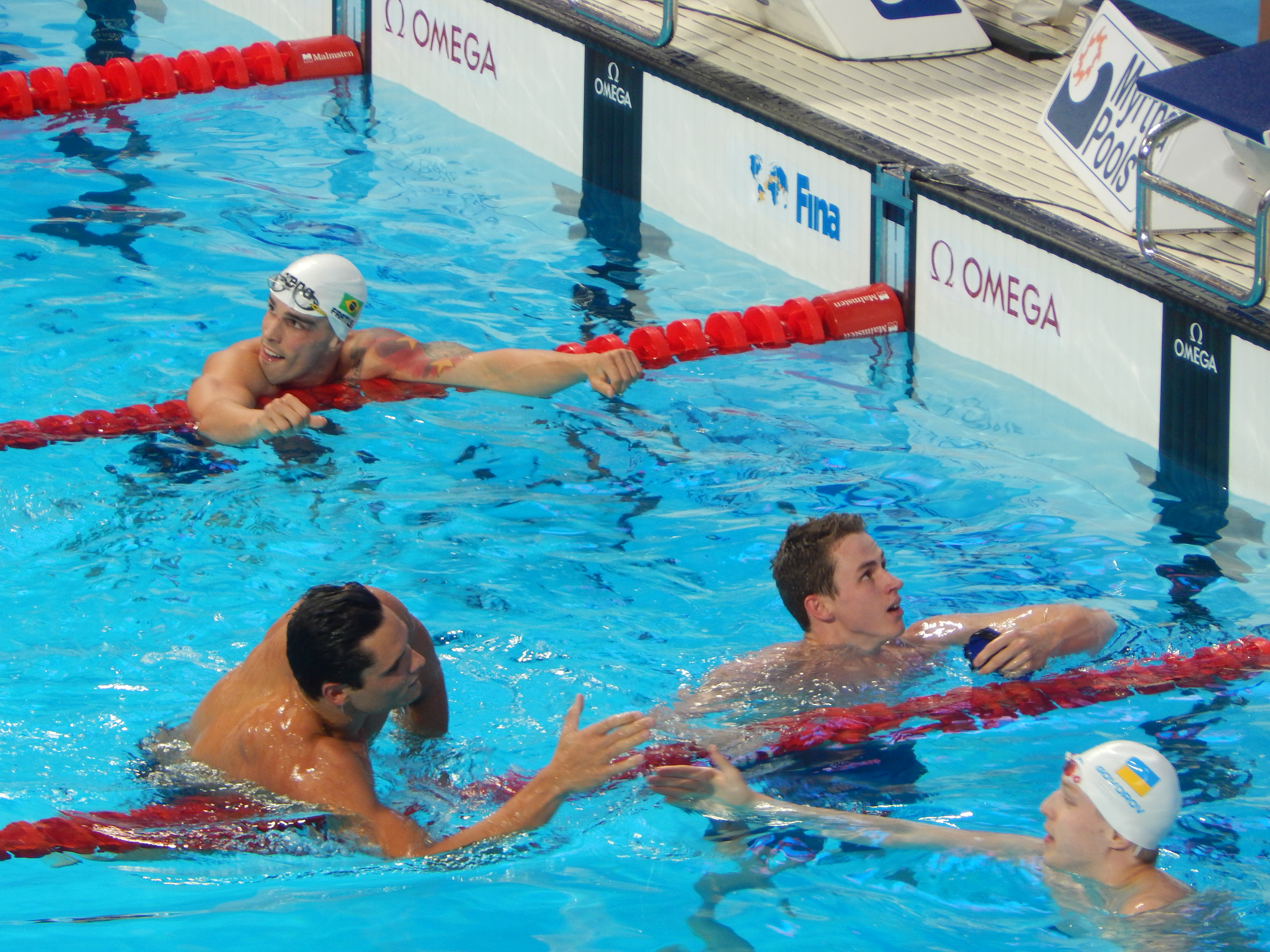
After finish

Rank	Lane	Name	Nationality	Time	Notes
1st place, gold medalist(s)	5	Florent Manaudou	France	21.19	
2nd place, silver medalist(s)	4	Nathan Adrian	United States	21.52	
3rd place, bronze medalist(s)	3	Bruno Fratus	Brazil	21.55	
4	8	Vladimir Morozov	Russia	21.56	
5	1	Andriy Hovorov	Ukraine	21.86	
5	6	Marco Orsi	Italy	21.86	
7	7	Kristian Gkolomeev	Greece	21.98	
8	2	Benjamin Proud	Great Britain	22.04	
