= Swimming at the 2015 World Aquatics Championships – Men's 50 metre butterfly =

Men's 50 metre butterfly at the 2015 World Aquatics Championships
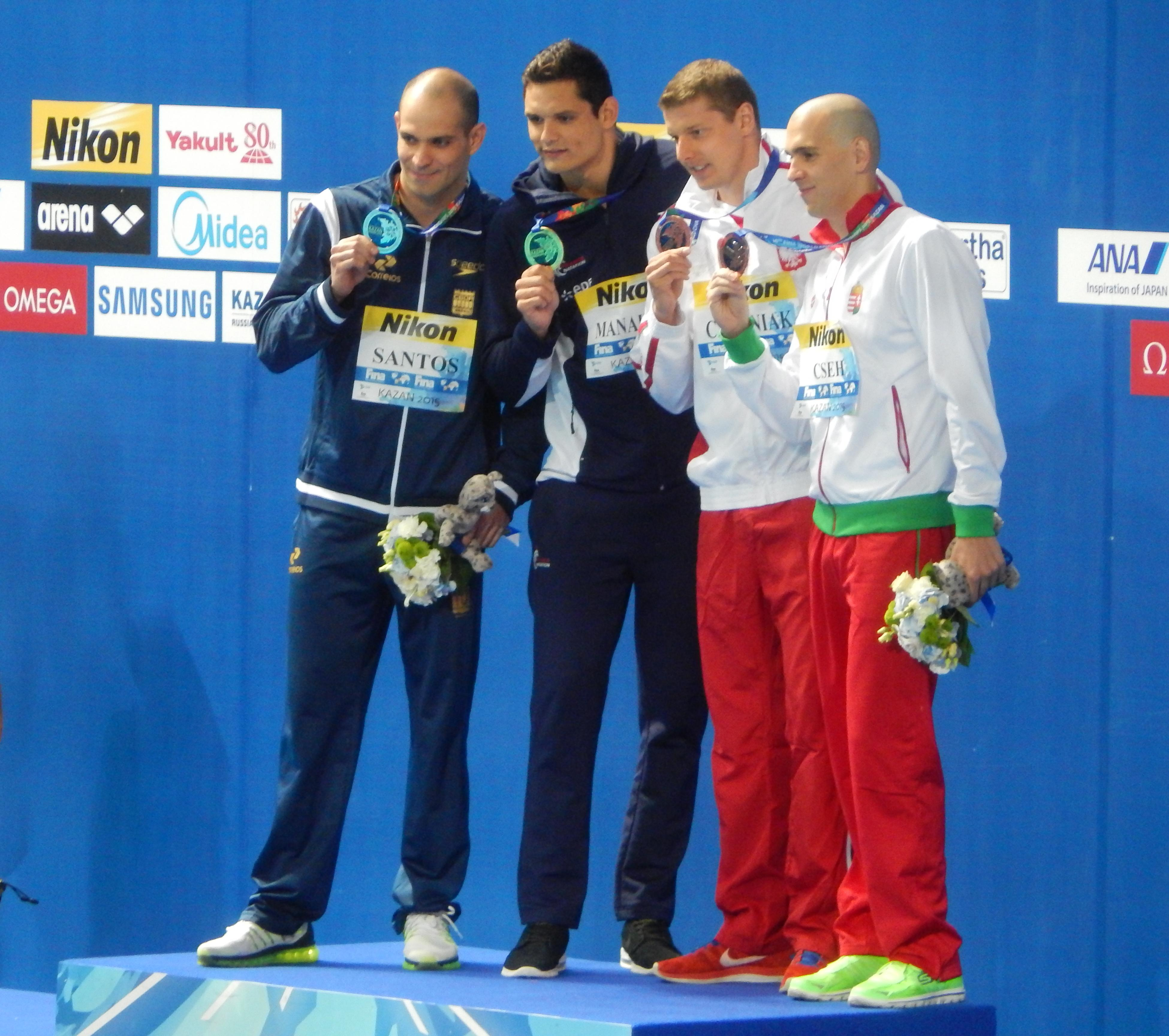
- Victory Ceremony
- Dates: 2 August (heats and semifinals); 3 August (final)
- Competitors: 80 from 77 nations
- Winning time: 22.97

Medalists
| gold medal | Florent Manaudou | France |
| silver medal | Nicholas Santos | Brazil |
| bronze medal | László Cseh | Hungary |
| bronze medal | Konrad Czerniak | Poland |

The Men's 50 metre butterfly competition of the swimming events at the 2015 World Aquatics Championships was held on 2 August with the heats and the semifinals and 3 August with the final.

== Records ==
Prior to the competition, the existing world and championship records were as follows.

| World record | Rafael Muñoz (ESP) | 22.43 | Málaga, Spain | 5 April 2009 |
| Competition record | Milorad Čavić (SRB) | 22.67 | Rome, Italy | 27 July 2009 |

== Results ==
=== Heats ===
The heats were held at 10:44.

| Rank | Heat | Lane | Name | Nationality | Time | Notes |
|---|---|---|---|---|---|---|
| 1 | 9 | 5 | Florent Manaudou | France | 23.15 | Q |
| 2 | 8 | 2 | László Cseh | Hungary | 23.32 | Q, NR |
| 3 | 9 | 3 | Rafael Muñoz | Spain | 23.36 | Q |
| 4 | 8 | 6 | Konrad Czerniak | Poland | 23.38 | Q, NR |
| 5 | 7 | 6 | Joseph Schooling | Singapore | 23.40 | Q, NR |
| 6 | 8 | 4 | Nicholas Santos | Brazil | 23.41 | Q |
| 7 | 9 | 2 | Shi Yang | China | 23.43 | Q |
| 8 | 8 | 3 | Chad le Clos | South Africa | 23.45 | Q |
| 9 | 8 | 5 | Yauhen Tsurkin | Belarus | 23.49 | Q |
| 9 | 9 | 4 | Andriy Hovorov | Ukraine | 23.49 | Q |
| 11 | 7 | 4 | Ben Proud | Great Britain | 23.58 | Q |
| 12 | 7 | 2 | François Heersbrandt | Belgium | 23.59 | Q |
| 13 | 7 | 7 | Takeshi Kawamoto | Japan | 23.61 | Q |
| 14 | 7 | 5 | César Cielo | Brazil | 23.66 | Q |
| 15 | 7 | 8 | Santo Condorelli | Canada | 23.67 | Q |
| 15 | 9 | 0 | Dylan Carter | Trinidad and Tobago | 23.67 | Q, NR |
| 17 | 7 | 1 | Aleksandr Popkov | Russia | 23.75 | |
| 18 | 7 | 3 | Piero Codia | Italy | 23.81 | |
| 19 | 8 | 1 | Jayden Hadler | Australia | 23.83 | |
| 20 | 6 | 9 | Tadas Duškinas | Lithuania | 23.85 | |
| 21 | 9 | 6 | Yu Hexin | China | 23.87 | |
| 21 | 9 | 8 | Ivan Lenđer | Serbia | 23.87 | |
| 23 | 9 | 1 | Tim Phillips | United States | 23.91 | |
| 24 | 8 | 9 | Kristian Golomeev | Greece | 23.96 | |
| 25 | 8 | 0 | Mario Todorović | Croatia | 24.00 | |
| 26 | 6 | 5 | Santiago Grassi | Argentina | 24.03 | |
| 27 | 7 | 9 | Geoffrey Cheah | Hong Kong | 24.12 | |
| 28 | 6 | 8 | Søren Dahl | Denmark | 24.13 | |
| 28 | 7 | 0 | Albert Subirats | Venezuela | 24.13 | |
| 30 | 6 | 4 | Christoffer Carlsen | Sweden | 24.18 | |
| 30 | 8 | 8 | Ryan Pini | Papua New Guinea | 24.18 | |
| 32 | 5 | 4 | Elvis Burrows | Bahamas | 24.19 | |
| 33 | 6 | 1 | Luis Martínez | Guatemala | 24.20 | |
| 34 | 6 | 2 | Ben Hockin | Paraguay | 24.24 | |
| 35 | 6 | 7 | Ralf Tribuntsov | Estonia | 24.28 | |
| 36 | 6 | 6 | Jan Šefl | Czech Republic | 24.34 | |
| 37 | 9 | 9 | Tomer Zamir | Israel | 24.49 | |
| 38 | 6 | 3 | Glenn Sutanto | Indonesia | 24.51 | |
| 39 | 5 | 5 | Franco Reyes | Panama | 24.60 | |
| 40 | 6 | 0 | Omar Eissa | Egypt | 24.63 | |
| 41 | 4 | 5 | Anthonny Ralefy | Madagascar | 24.69 | |
| 42 | 8 | 7 | Alejandro Escudero | Mexico | 24.73 | |
| 43 | 5 | 1 | Zuhayr Pigot | Suriname | 24.76 | |
| 44 | 9 | 7 | Daniel Ramírez | Mexico | 24.83 | |
| 45 | 5 | 3 | Anthony John Barbar | Lebanon | 24.88 | NR |
| 46 | 5 | 2 | Ralph Goveia | Zambia | 25.16 | |
| 47 | 5 | 6 | Thibaut Danho | Ivory Coast | 25.33 | |
| 48 | 5 | 9 | Bradley Vincent | Mauritius | 25.42 | |
| 49 | 5 | 7 | Maksim Inić | Montenegro | 25.52 | |
| 50 | 4 | 3 | Joshua Daniel | Saint Lucia | 25.61 | |
| 51 | 4 | 6 | Ifeakachuku Nmor | Nigeria | 25.91 | |
| 52 | 5 | 8 | Ahmad Attellesey | Libya | 25.94 | |
| 53 | 3 | 5 | Oumar Touré | Mali | 26.13 | |
| 54 | 5 | 0 | Vahan Mkhitaryan | Armenia | 26.19 | |
| 55 | 4 | 4 | Abeiku Jackson | Ghana | 26.41 | |
| 56 | 4 | 1 | Hasan Sadeq | Iraq | 26.93 | |
| 57 | 4 | 2 | Adam Viktora | Seychelles | 27.08 | |
| 58 | 4 | 0 | Ibrahim Nishwan | Maldives | 27.42 | |
| 59 | 3 | 4 | Muhammad Saad | Pakistan | 27.66 | |
| 60 | 4 | 8 | Stefano Mitchell | Antigua and Barbuda | 27.72 | |
| 61 | 3 | 6 | Myat Thint | Myanmar | 27.77 | |
| 62 | 3 | 2 | Borhane Abro | Djibouti | 27.99 | |
| 63 | 4 | 7 | Yacop Al-Khulaifi | Qatar | 28.31 | |
| 64 | 4 | 9 | Nikolas Sylvester | Saint Vincent and the Grenadines | 28.39 | |
| 65 | 3 | 0 | Meriton Veliu | Kosovo (Note: This designation is without prejudice to position on status, and is in line with UNSC 1244 and the ICJ Opinion on the Kosovo declaration of independence) | 28.67 | |
| 66 | 3 | 3 | Ammaar Ghadiyali | Tanzania | 28.81 | |
| 67 | 2 | 2 | Abdelaziz Ahmed | Sudan | 29.66 | |
| 68 | 3 | 1 | Olim Kurbanov | Tajikistan | 29.82 | |
| 69 | 2 | 5 | Kaleo Kihleng | Federated States of Micronesia | 30.15 | |
| 70 | 1 | 6 | Dienov Koka | Congo | 30.20 | |
| 71 | 3 | 8 | Billy-Scott Irakoze | Burundi | 30.44 | |
| 72 | 2 | 6 | Yousef Al-Nehmi | Yemen | 30.53 | |
| 73 | 2 | 3 | Brave Lifa | Malawi | 30.92 | |
| 74 | 3 | 7 | Robel Habte | Ethiopia | 30.95 | |
| 75 | 2 | 8 | Chaoili Aonzoudine | Comoros | 31.09 | |
| 76 | 3 | 9 | Andrew Fowler | Guyana | 31.14 | |
| 77 | 2 | 4 | Jules Bessan | Benin | 31.53 | |
| 78 | 1 | 3 | Pap Jonga | The Gambia | 32.36 | |
| 79 | 1 | 5 | Osman Kamara | Sierra Leone | 35.21 | |
| 80 | 2 | 1 | Mael Ambonguilat | Gabon | 35.30 | |
| | 1 | 4 | Charly Ndjoume | Cameroon | DNS | |
| | 2 | 7 | Albarchir Mouctar | Niger | DNS | |

=== Semifinals ===
The semifinals were held on 2 August at 18:07.

==== Semifinal 1 ====
| Rank | Lane | Name | Nationality | Time | Notes |
|---|---|---|---|---|---|
| 1 | 3 | Nicholas Santos | Brazil | 23.05 | Q |
| 2 | 4 | László Cseh | Hungary | 23.06 | Q, NR |
| 3 | 5 | Konrad Czerniak | Poland | 23.07 | Q, NR |
| 4 | 2 | Andriy Hovorov | Ukraine | 23.15 | Q |
| 5 | 1 | César Cielo | Brazil | 23.29 | Q |
| 6 | 7 | François Heersbrandt | Belgium | 23.34 | NR |
| 7 | 6 | Chad le Clos | South Africa | 23.49 | |
| 8 | 8 | Dylan Carter | Trinidad and Tobago | 23.60 | NR |

==== Semifinal 2 ====
| Rank | Lane | Name | Nationality | Time | Notes |
|---|---|---|---|---|---|
| 1 | 4 | Florent Manaudou | France | 22.84 | Q, =NR |
| 2 | 7 | Ben Proud | Great Britain | 23.24 | Q |
| 3 | 3 | Joseph Schooling | Singapore | 23.27 | Q, AS |
| 4 | 8 | Santo Condorelli | Canada | 23.30 | NR |
| 5 | 2 | Yauhen Tsurkin | Belarus | 23.41 | |
| 6 | 5 | Rafael Muñoz | Spain | 23.44 | |
| 6 | 6 | Shi Yang | China | 23.44 | |
| 8 | 1 | Takeshi Kawamoto | Japan | 23.74 | |

=== Final ===
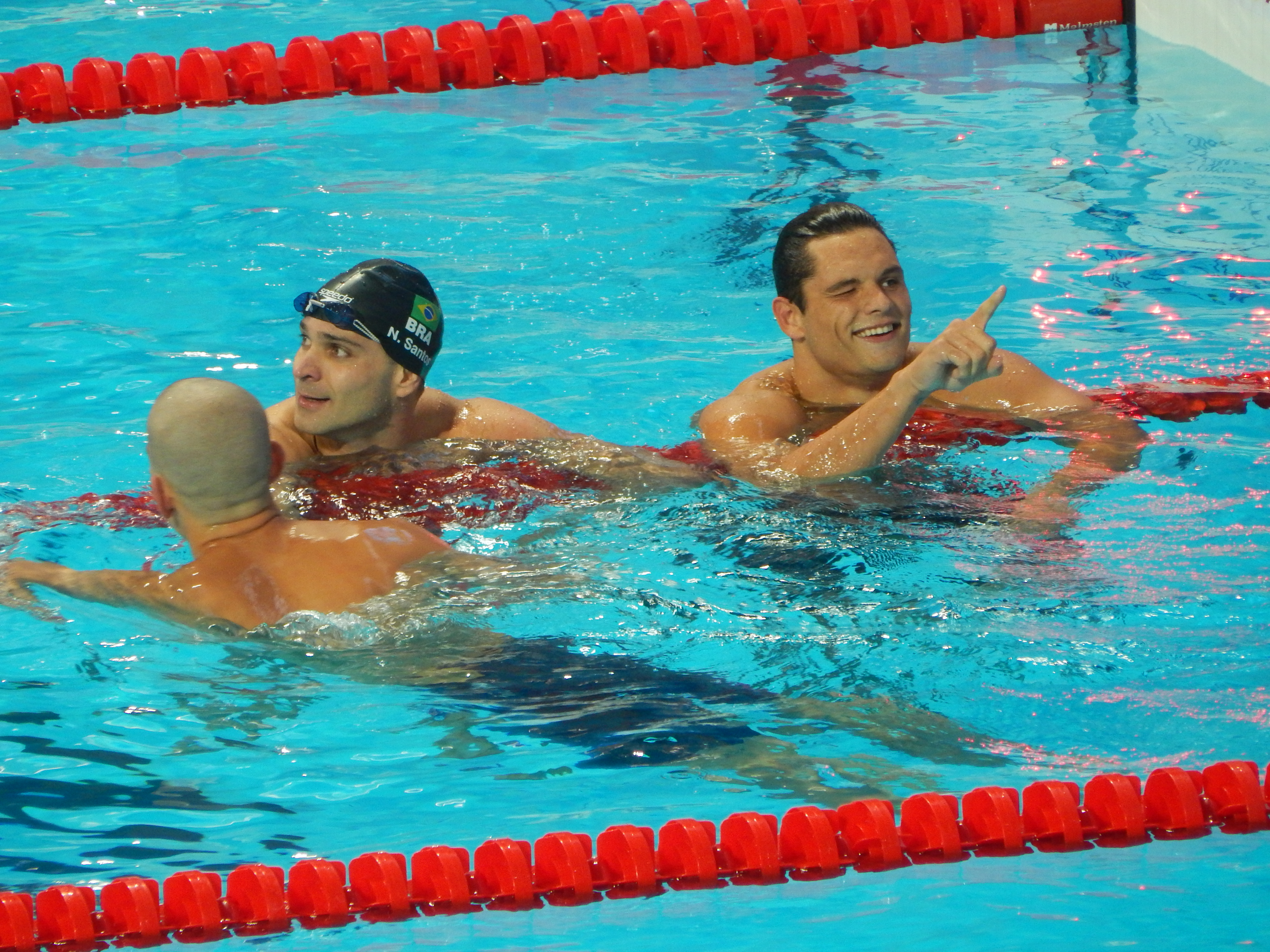
Medallists of 50m butterfly final: László Cseh, Nicholas Santos and Florent Manaudou

The final was held on 3 August at 18:17.

| Rank | Lane | Name | Nationality | Time | Notes |
|---|---|---|---|---|---|
| 1st place, gold medalist(s) | 4 | Florent Manaudou | France | 22.97 | |
| 2nd place, silver medalist(s) | 5 | Nicholas Santos | Brazil | 23.09 | |
| 3rd place, bronze medalist(s) | 3 | László Cseh | Hungary | 23.15 | |
| 3rd place, bronze medalist(s) | 6 | Konrad Czerniak | Poland | 23.15 | |
| 5 | 2 | Andriy Hovorov | Ukraine | 23.18 | |
| 6 | 8 | César Cielo | Brazil | 23.21 | |
| 7 | 1 | Joseph Schooling | Singapore | 23.25 | AS |
| 8 | 7 | Ben Proud | Great Britain | 23.39 | |
