= Swimming at the 2016 Summer Olympics – Men's 50 metre freestyle =

Men's 50 metre freestyle at the Games of the XXXI Olympiad
- Venue: Olympic Aquatics Stadium
- Dates: 11 August 2016 (heats & semifinals); 12 August 2016 (final)
- Competitors: 85 from 72 nations
- Winning time: 21.40

Medalists
1st place, gold medalist(s)		Anthony Ervin	United States
2nd place, silver medalist(s)		Florent Manaudou	France
3rd place, bronze medalist(s)		Nathan Adrian	United States

The men's 50 metre freestyle event at the 2016 Summer Olympics took place on 11–12 August at the Olympic Aquatics Stadium.

== Summary ==
Sixteen years after he tied for the gold with Gary Hall, Jr., U.S. swimmer Anthony Ervin, aged 35, reclaimed his title in the program's shortest race to become the oldest male champion in Olympic swimming history. He threw down a gold-medal time of 21.40 to touch out the defending titleholder Florent Manaudou of France by a hundredth of a second. Manaudou was quick off the blocks, but could not catch Ervin near the wall to finish with a silver in 21.41. Meanwhile, Ervin's teammate Nathan Adrian swam to another bronze-medal feat at the Games with a 21.49.

Separated the top three by almost two tenths of a second, Great Britain's Benjamin Proud finished off the podium with a fourth-place time in 21.68, while Ukraine's Andriy Govorov, who led a vast field of swimmers earlier in the heats, slipped shortly to fifth in 21.74. Brazil's hometown favorite Bruno Fratus, fourth-place finalist from London 2012, and South Africa's Brad Tandy shared the sixth spot in a matching 21.79, with Lithuanian swimmer Simonas Bilis (22.08) closing out the field.

Other notable swimmers featured Australia's Cameron McEvoy, Russia's Vladimir Morozov, Manaudou's brother-in-law and countryman Frédérick Bousquet, and Trinidad and Tobago's George Bovell, who scored a twenty-seventh place finish in his fifth Olympic appearance.

== Records ==
Prior to this competition, the existing world and Olympic records were as follows.

World record	César Cielo (BRA)	20.91	São Paulo, Brazil	18 December 2009
Olympic record	César Cielo (BRA)	21.30	Beijing, China	16 August 2008

== Qualification ==
The Olympic Qualifying Time for the event was 22.27 seconds. Up to two swimmers per National Olympic Committee (NOC) could automatically qualify by swimming that time at an approved qualification event. The Olympic Selection Time was 23.05 seconds. Up to one swimmer per NOC meeting that time was eligible for selection, allocated by world ranking until the maximum quota for all swimming events was reached. NOCs without a male swimmer qualified in any event could also use their universality place.

== Competition format ==
The competition consisted of three rounds: heats, semifinals, and a final. The swimmers with the best 16 times in the heats advanced to the semifinals. The swimmers with the best 8 times in the semifinals advanced to the final. Swim-offs were used as necessary to break ties for advancement to the next round.

== Results ==
=== Heats ===
The swimmers with the top 16 times, regardless of heat, advanced to the semifinals.

Rank	Heat	Lane	Name	Nation	Time	Notes
1	11	3	Andriy Govorov	Ukraine	21.49	Q, NR
2	10	4	Nathan Adrian	United States	21.61	Q
3	10	5	Anthony Ervin	United States	21.63	Q
4	11	4	Florent Manaudou	France	21.72	Q
5	9	4	Cameron McEvoy	Australia	21.80	Q
6	9	5	Vladimir Morozov	Russia	21.81	Q
7	10	3	Benjamin Proud	Great Britain	21.83	Q
7	10	7	Santo Condorelli	Canada	21.83	Q
9	9	2	Luca Dotto	Italy	21.87	Q
10	10	6	Kristian Gkolomeev	Greece	21.93	Q
10	11	5	Bruno Fratus	Brazil	21.93	Q
12	9	6	Brad Tandy	South Africa	21.94	Q
13	11	6	Ítalo Duarte	Brazil	21.96	Q
14	9	7	Shinri Shioura	Japan	22.01	Q
14	11	8	Simonas Bilis	Lithuania	22.01	Q, NR
16	10	8	Norbert Trandafir	Romania	22.10	Q
17	11	2	Krisztián Takács	Hungary	22.12	
18	10	2	Katsumi Nakamura	Japan	22.13	
19	9	3	Damian Wierling	Germany	22.18	
20	8	2	Yu Hexin	China	22.20	
21	7	8	Renzo Tjon-A-Joe	Suriname	22.23	NR
21	8	4	Filip Wypych	Poland	22.23	
23	7	2	Ali Khalafalla	Egypt	22.25	=NR
23	11	7	Ari-Pekka Liukkonen	Finland	22.25	
25	7	1	Oussama Sahnoune	Algeria	22.27	
25	9	1	Frédérick Bousquet	France	22.27	
27	8	7	George Bovell	Trinidad and Tobago	22.30	
28	8	3	Aleksei Brianskiy	Russia	22.33	
29	7	7	Douglas Erasmus	South Africa	22.37	
30	8	8	Ning Zetao	China	22.38	
31	7	6	Federico Grabich	Argentina	22.44	
32	6	4	Geoffrey Cheah	Hong Kong	22.46	
33	8	5	Odysseus Meladinis	Greece	22.47	
33	10	1	Matthew Abood	Australia	22.47	
35	7	3	Yuri Kisil	Canada	22.50	
35	9	8	Paweł Juraszek	Poland	22.50	
37	11	1	Federico Bocchia	Italy	22.54	
38	8	1	François Heersbrandt	Belgium	22.58	
39	7	4	Jasper Aerents	Belgium	22.61	
40	6	5	Mario Todorović	Croatia	22.65	
41	1	3	Sidni Hoxha	Albania	22.80	NR
41	8	6	Ziv Kalontarov	Israel	22.80	
43	6	6	Shane Ryan	Ireland	22.88	
44	6	3	Cristian Quintero	Venezuela	22.92	
45	6	2	Jordan Augier	Saint Lucia	23.28	
46	6	7	José Alberto Quintanilla	Bolivia	23.35	
47	6	1	Vahan Mkhitaryan	Armenia	23.50	
48	5	6	Abdoul Niane	Senegal	23.66	
49	4	4	Hilal Hemed Hilal	Tanzania	23.70	NR
50	6	8	Anthony Barbar	Lebanon	23.77	
51	5	4	Meli Malani	Fiji	23.88	
51	5	5	Maksim Inić	Montenegro	23.88	
53	5	3	Ahmad Attellesey	Libya	23.89	
54	5	7	Mahfizur Rahman Sagor	Bangladesh	23.92	
55	5	8	Abeiku Jackson	Ghana	24.30	
56	1	7	Adam Viktora	Seychelles	24.32	
57	5	1	Lum Zhaveli	Kosovo	24.53	
58	4	5	Farhan Farhan	Bahrain	24.61	
59	4	3	Samson Opuakpo	Nigeria	24.85	
60	5	2	Batsaikhany Dulguun	Mongolia	24.90	
61	2	1	Nikolas Sylvester	Saint Vincent and the Grenadines	25.64	NR
62	4	8	Olim Qurbonov	Tajikistan	25.77	
63	4	7	Giordan Harris	Marshall Islands	25.81	
64	4	6	Joshua Tibatemwa	Uganda	25.98	
65	3	5	Dionisio Augustine	Federated States of Micronesia	26.17	
66	4	1	Billy-Scott Irakose	Burundi	26.36	
67	2	7	Tindwende Sawadogo	Burkina Faso	26.38	
68	4	2	Eloi Imaniraguha	Rwanda	26.43	
69	3	8	Santisouk Inthavong	Laos	26.54	NR
70	2	4	Albachir Mouctar	Niger	26.56	NR
71	3	4	Ibrahim Nishwan	Maldives	26.72	
72	3	6	Shawn Dingilius-Wallace	Palau	26.78	
73	2	5	Osman Kamara	Sierra Leone	26.90	
74	2	2	Bourhan Abro	Djibouti	27.13	
75	1	5	Maël Ambonguilat	Gabon	27.21	NR
76	3	1	Athoumane Solihi	Comoros	27.31	
77	3	2	Jules Bessan	Benin	27.32	
78	3	3	Amadou Camara	Guinea	27.35	
79	3	7	Pap Jonga	The Gambia	27.48	
80	2	6	Eméric Kpegba	Togo	27.67	
81	2	3	Abdelaziz Mohamed Ahmed	Sudan	27.71	
82	2	8	Dienov Andres Koka	Republic of the Congo	28.00	
83	1	4	Brave Lifa	Malawi	28.54	
84	1	2	Christian Nassif	Central African Republic	30.00	
85	1	6	Frantz Dorsainvil	Haiti	30.86	

=== Semifinals ===
The swimmers with the best 8 times, regardless of heat, advanced to the final.

Rank	Heat	Lane	Name	Nation	Time	Notes
1	1	5	Florent Manaudou	France	21.32	Q
2	2	4	Andriy Govorov	Ukraine	21.46	Q, NR
2	2	5	Anthony Ervin	United States	21.46	Q
4	1	4	Nathan Adrian	United States	21.47	Q
5	2	6	Benjamin Proud	Great Britain	21.54	Q, NR
6	2	7	Bruno Fratus	Brazil	21.71	Q
6	2	8	Simonas Bilis	Lithuania	21.71	Q, NR
8	1	7	Brad Tandy	South Africa	21.80	Q
9	2	2	Luca Dotto	Italy	21.84	
10	1	3	Vladimir Morozov	Russia	21.88	
11	2	3	Cameron McEvoy	Australia	21.89	
12	1	6	Santo Condorelli	Canada	21.97	
13	1	2	Kristian Gkolomeev	Greece	21.98	
14	1	8	Norbert Trandafir	Romania	21.99	
15	2	1	Ítalo Duarte	Brazil	22.05	
16	1	1	Shinri Shioura	Japan	22.18	

=== Final ===
Rank	Lane	Name	Nation	Time	Notes
1st place, gold medalist(s)	3	Anthony Ervin	United States	21.40	
2nd place, silver medalist(s)	4	Florent Manaudou	France	21.41	
3rd place, bronze medalist(s)	6	Nathan Adrian	United States	21.49	
4	2	Benjamin Proud	Great Britain	21.68	
5	5	Andriy Govorov	Ukraine	21.74	
6	7	Bruno Fratus	Brazil	21.79	
6	8	Brad Tandy	South Africa	21.79	
8	1	Simonas Bilis	Lithuania	22.08	
