= Abdelaziz Mohamed Ahmed =

Sudanese swimmer

Personal information
- Nationality: Sudanese
- Born: 12 October 1994 (age 30)
- Height: 1.81 m (5 ft 11 in)
- Weight: 72 kg (159 lb)

Sport
- Country: Sudan
- Sport: Swimming

Abdelaziz Mohamed Ahmed (born 12 October 1994) is a Sudanese swimmer. He represented Sudan at the 2016 Summer Olympics in the Men's 50 metre freestyle event where he placed 81st in the heats with a time of 27.71 seconds. He did not advance to the semifinals.
