= Ítalo Duarte =

Brazilian swimmer (born 1992)

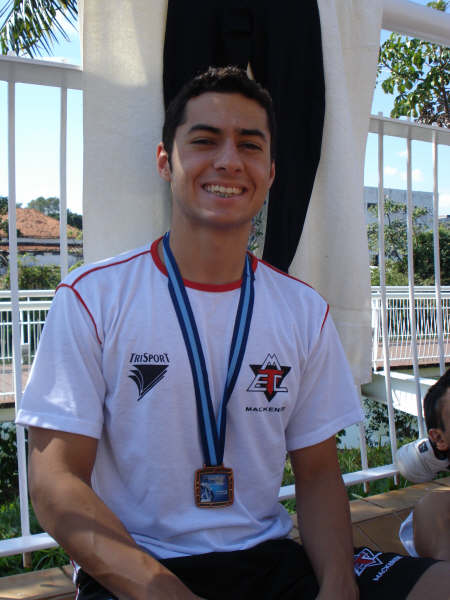

Personal information
- Full name: Ítalo Manzine Amaral Duarte Garófalo
- National team: Brazil
- Born: 13 March 1992 (age 34) Belo Horizonte, Brazil
- Height: 1.80 m (5 ft 11 in)
- Weight: 73 kg (161 lb)

Sport
- Sport: Swimming
- Strokes: Freestyle
Medal record
Men's swimming
Representing Brazil
Universiade
Silver medal – second place	2017 Taipei	50 m freestyle

Ítalo Manzine Amaral Duarte Garófalo (born 13 March 1992) is a Brazilian competitive swimmer who specializes in freestyle.

In April 2016, at the Maria Lenk Trophy, held in Rio de Janeiro, he made César Cielo, the 2008 Olympic gold medalist in the 50-metre freestyle, fail to qualify for the 2016 Summer Olympics. In the 50-metre freestyle, Cielo won the heats with 21.99, staying temporarily with the Brazil's second vacancy. However, in the final, Ítalo Duarte finished second, with a time of 21.82. Cielo finished third, with a time of 21.91. Brazil's Olympic vacancies were with Bruno Fratus and Ítalo Duarte.

He participated in the 2016 Summer Olympics in Rio de Janeiro, swimming the 50 meter freestyle. He swam the 13th time in the heats and qualified for the semifinals, where he was eliminated.
