= Dionisio Augustine =

Micronesian swimmer

Dionisio Augustine II
Personal information
- Nationality: Micronesian
- Born: 16 June 1992 (age 33); Pohnpei
- Height: 1.53 m (5 ft 0 in)
- Weight: 65 kg (143 lb)

Sport
- Country: Micronesia
- Sport: Swimming

Dionisio Augustine II (born 16 June 1992) is a Micronesian Olympic swimmer. He represented his country at the 2016 Summer Olympics in the Men's 50 metre freestyle event where he ranked 65th with a time of 26.17 seconds. He did not advance to the semifinals.
