= Adam Viktora =

Seychellois swimmer

Personal information
- Nationality: Seychellois
- Born: 6 September 1996 (age 28); Czech Republic
- Height: 1.88 m (6 ft 2 in)
- Weight: 94 kg (207 lb)

Sport
- Country: Seychelles
- Sport: Swimming

Adam Viktora (born 6 September 1996) is a Seychellois Olympic swimmer. He represented his country at the 2016 Summer Olympics in the Men's 50 metre freestyle event where he ranked at #56 with a time of 24.30 seconds. He did not advance to the semifinals.

In 2014, he represented Seychelles at the 2014 Summer Youth Olympics held in Nanjing, China.
