= Frantz Dorsainvil =

Haitian swimmer (born 1991)

Personal information
- Nationality: Haitian
- Born: 2 July 1991 (age 35)

Sport
- Sport: Swimming

Frantz Dorsainvil (born 2 July 1991) is a Haitian swimmer. He received a universality spot to compete in 50m freestyle at the 2015 Pan American Games in Toronto and finished 22nd with a time of 33.83 seconds. He competed in the men's 50 metre freestyle event at the 2016 Summer Olympics, where he ranked 83rd with a time of 30.86 seconds. He did not advance to the semifinals.
