= Dienov Andres Koka =

Congolese swimmer

Personal information
- Nationality: Congolese
- Born: 2 August 1996 (age 29)

Sport
- Sport: Swimming

Dienov Andres Koka (born 2 August 1996) is a Congolese swimmer. He competed in the men's 50 metre freestyle event at the 2016 Summer Olympics, where he ranked 82nd with a time of 28.00 seconds. He did not advance to the semifinals.
