= Amadou Camara =

Guinean swimmer

Personal information
- Nationality: Guinean
- Born: 10 September 1994 (age 31)
- Height: 1.63 m (5 ft 4 in)
- Weight: 69 kg (152 lb)

Sport
- Country: Guinea
- Sport: Swimming

Amadou Camara (born 10 September 1994) is a Guinean Olympic swimmer.

== Career ==
He represented his country at the 2016 Summer Olympics in the Men's 50 metre freestyle event where he ranked 78th in the heats with a time of 27.35 seconds. He did not advance to the semifinals.

Amadou Camara was did not return to Guinea after the 2016 Summer Olympics in Brazil, having disappeared 48 hours before the team's scheduled departure. He was one of two Guinean athletes disappearing prior to the scheduled return of their country's contingent. The other was Mamadama Bangoura, who competed in judo.
