= Billy-Scott Irakose =

Burundian swimmer

Billy-Scott Irakoze
Personal information
- Full name: Irakoze Billy Scott
- Nationality: Burundian
- Born: 30 October 1996 (age 29) Hawaï
- Height: 196 cm (6 ft 5 in)
- Weight: 75 kg (165 lb)

Sport
- Sport: Swimming
- Strokes: Freestyle
- Club: Fitness Club de Bujumbura
- College team: USIU dolphins

Billy-Scott Irakose (born 30 October 1996) is a Burundian swimmer. He competed in the men's 50 metre freestyle event at the 2016 Summer Olympics, where he ranked 66th with a time of 26.36 seconds. He did not advance to the semifinals. He represented Burundi at the 2019 African Games held in Rabat, Morocco.
