= Eméric Kpegba =

Togolese swimmer (born 1999)

Personal information
- Nationality: Togolese
- Born: 29 May 1999 (age 27)

Sport
- Sport: Swimming

Eméric Kpegba (born 29 May 1999) is a Togolese swimmer. He competed in the men's 50 metre freestyle event at the 2016 Summer Olympics. He ranked 80th in the heats with a time of 27.67 seconds, and did not advance to the semifinals. In 2019, he represented Togo at the 2019 African Games held in Rabat, Morocco. He ranked 34th in the men's 50 metre butterfly with a time of 32.33 seconds and 38th in the men's 50 metre freestyle with 27.72 seconds.
