= Jules Bessan =

Beninese swimmer (born 1979)

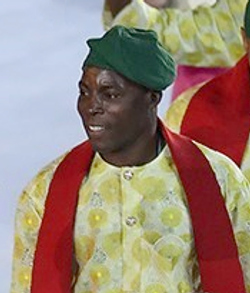
- Bessan at the 2016 Olympics

Personal information
- Nationality: Beninese
- Born: 14 April 1979 (age 46) Cotonou, Benin
- Height: 1.83 m (6 ft 0 in)
- Weight: 85 kg (187 lb)

Sport
- Country: Benin
- Sport: Swimming

Jules Yao Bessan (born 14 April 1979) is a Beninese Olympic swimmer. He represented his country at the 2016 Summer Olympics in the 50 metre freestyle event where he placed 77th with a time of 27.32 seconds. He did not advance to the semifinals.

Bessan holds the Beninese national record in 50 metre freestyle and 50 metre breaststroke.
