= Maël Ambonguilat =

Gabonese swimmer (born 1997)

Personal information
- Born: 9 November 1997 (age 28)

Sport
- Sport: Swimming

Maël Ambonguilat (born 9 November 1997) is a Gabonese swimmer. He competed in the men's 50 metre freestyle event at the 2016 Summer Olympics. The first Olympic swimmer to compete for Gabon, Amboniguilat ranked 75th with a time of 27.21 seconds, in a field of 85 swimmers. He did not advance to the semifinals.
