= Maksim Inić =

Montenegrin swimmer

Personal information
- Born: 26 May 1996 (age 30)

Sport
- Sport: Swimming

Maksim Inić (born 26 May 1996) is a Montenegrin swimmer. He competed in the men's 50 metre freestyle event at the 2016 Summer Olympics.
