= Ahmad Attellesey =

Libyan swimmer (born 1995)

Personal information
- Nationality: Libyan
- Born: 30 July 1995 (age 30) Malmö, Sweden

Sport
- Sport: Swimming

Ahmad Attellesey (born 30 July 1995) is a Libyan swimmer. He competed in the men's 50 metre freestyle event at the 2016 Summer Olympics.
