= Pap Jonga =

Gambian swimmer

Personal information
- Full name: Pap D. Jonga
- Nationality: Gambian
- Born: 1 July 1997 (age 29) Barra, North Bank, Gambia

Sport
- Sport: Swimming

Pap D. Jonga (born 1 July 1997) is a Gambian swimmer. The first Olympic swimmer to compete for the Gambia, Jonga competed in the men's 50 metre freestyle event at the 2016 Summer Olympics, where he ranked 79th in the heats with a time of 27.48 seconds. He did not advance to the semifinals.
