= Brave Lifa =

Malawian swimmer

Personal information
- Nationality: Malawian
- Born: 5 September 1995 (age 30)

Sport
- Sport: Swimming
- Strokes: 50M Freestyle, 50M Butterfly
- Club: Barracudas 2008-2011, ABCCA Stingrays

Brave Lifa (born 5 September 1995) is a Malawian swimmer. He competed in the men's 50 metre freestyle event at the 2016 Summer Olympics, where he ranked 83rd with a time of 28.54 seconds. He did not advance to the semifinals.
