= Nishwan Ibrahim =

Maldivian swimmer

Personal information
- Nationality: Maldivian
- Born: 12 June 1997 (age 28) Malé, Maldives

Sport
- Country: Maldives
- Sport: Swimming

Nishwan Ibrahim (born 12 June 1997) is a Maldivian Olympic swimmer. He represented his country at the 2016 Summer Olympics.
