= Osman Kamara (swimmer) =

Sierra Leonean swimmer (born 1987)

Personal information
- Born: December 31, 1987 (age 38)

Sport
- Sport: Swimming

Osman Kamara (born 31 December 1987) is a Sierra Leonean swimmer. He competed in the 100 m freestyle, 50 m backstroke and 50 m butterfly events at the 2012 FINA World Swimming Championships (25 m) and in the 50 m freestyle and 50 m butterfly events at the 2013 World Aquatics Championships in Barcelona. In Barcelona he set national records for the 50 m butterfly and 50 m freestyle.
