= Swimming at the 2020 European Aquatics Championships – Women's 50 metre breaststroke =

Swimming competition

Women's 50 metre breaststroke at the 2020 European Aquatics Championships
- Venue: Danube Arena
- Dates: 22 May 2021 (heats and semifinals); 23 May 2021 (final)
- Competitors: 51 from 29 nations
- Winning time: 29.35

Medalists
gold medal	Benedetta Pilato	Italy
silver medal	Ida Hulkko	Finland
bronze medal	Yuliya Yefimova	Russia

The Women's 50 metre breaststroke competition of the 2020 European Aquatics Championships was held on 22 and 23 May 2021.

== Records ==
Before the competition, the existing world, European and championship records were as follows.

	Name	Nation	Time	Location	Date
World record	Lilly King	United States	29.40	Budapest	30 July 2017
European record	Rūta Meilutytė	Lithuania	29.48	Barcelona	3 August 2013
Championship record	Yuliya Yefimova	Russia	29.66	Glasgow	8 August 2018

The following new records were set during this competition.

Date	Event	Name	Nationality	Time	Record
22 May	Heats	Benedetta Pilato	Italy	29.50	CR
22 May	Semifinals	Benedetta Pilato	Italy	29.30	WR, CR

== Results ==
=== Heats ===
The heats were started on 22 May at 10:52.

Rank	Heat	Lane	Name	Nationality	Time	Notes
1	6	4	Benedetta Pilato	Italy	29.50	Q, CR, WJ, NR
2	4	5	Arianna Castiglioni	Italy	30.15	Q
3	6	5	Ida Hulkko	Finland	30.40	Q
4	5	5	Sophie Hansson	Sweden	30.46	Q
5	5	4	Yuliya Yefimova	Russia	30.55	Q
6	4	4	Martina Carraro	Italy	30.57	
7	6	6	Sarah Vasey	Great Britain	30.58	Q
8	5	3	Rosey Metz	Netherlands	30.63	Q
9	5	2	Emelie Fast	Sweden	30.64	Q
10	6	3	Alina Zmushka	Belarus	30.81	Q
11	6	2	Eneli Jefimova	Estonia	30.83	Q, NR
12	5	8	Veera Kivirinta	Finland	30.95	Q
13	4	3	Tatiana Belonogoff	Russia	31.05	Q
14	5	7	Anna Sztankovics	Hungary	31.09	Q
15	3	7	Klara Thormalm	Sweden	31.12	
16	2	3	Ema Rajić	Croatia	31.19	Q, NR
17	4	8	Jenna Laukkanen	Finland	31.28	
18	4	7	Lisa Angiolini	Italy	31.39	
19	6	8	Lisa Mamie	Switzerland	31.42	Q
20	6	0	Jessica Steiger	Germany	31.46	Q
21	5	1	Kotryna Teterevkova	Lithuania	31.51	
22	4	0	Maria-Thaleia Drasidou	Greece	31.55	
22	5	9	Anne Louise Palmans	Netherlands	31.55	
24	3	5	Andrea Podmaníková	Slovakia	31.69	
25	6	9	Maria Romanjuk	Estonia	31.70	
26	4	1	Dominika Sztandera	Poland	31.75	
27	3	4	Petra Halmai	Hungary	31.78	
28	4	2	Tes Schouten	Netherlands	31.82	
29	5	6	Evgeniia Chikunova	Russia	31.90	
30	3	9	Niamh Coyne	Ireland	31.99	
31	4	6	Jessica Vall	Spain	32.05	
32	6	1	Fleur Vermeiren	Belgium	32.08	
33	3	6	Thea Blomsterberg	Denmark	32.12	
33	2	4	Arina Sisojeva	Latvia	32.12	
35	4	9	Hannah Brunzell	Sweden	32.18	
35	6	7	Maria Temnikova	Russia	32.18	
37	3	0	Siiri Einiö	Finland	32.20	
37	3	8	Lena Kreundl	Austria	32.20	
39	3	1	Justine Delmas	France	32.23	
40	2	6	Anastasia Basisto	Moldova	32.28	
41	3	3	Diana Petkova	Bulgaria	32.29	
42	1	4	Bente Fischer	Germany	32.31	
42	5	0	Cornelia Pammer	Austria	32.31	
44	2	5	Alina Tkachenko	Ukraine	32.35	
45	2	8	Clara Rybak-Andersen	Denmark	32.42	
46	3	2	Tjaša Vozel	Slovenia	32.47	
47	2	1	Alíz Kalmár	Hungary	32.67	
48	2	2	Nina Vadovičová	Slovakia	32.73	
49	2	7	Hazal Özkan	Turkey	32.90	
50	1	5	Nikoleta Trníková	Slovakia	33.59	
51	1	3	Nàdia Tudó	Andorra	33.79	

=== Semifinals ===
The semifinals were started on 22 May at 18:57.

==== Semifinal 1 ====
Rank	Lane	Name	Nationality	Time	Notes
1	3	Sarah Vasey	Great Britain	30.35	Q
2	4	Arianna Castiglioni	Italy	30.44	Q
3	5	Sophie Hansson	Sweden	30.53	q
4	7	Tatiana Belonogoff	Russia	30.84	q
5	6	Emelie Fast	Sweden	30.88	
6	2	Eneli Jefimova	Estonia	30.97	
7	1	Ema Rajić	Croatia	31.04	NR
8	8	Jessica Steiger	Germany	31.37	

==== Semifinal 2 ====
Rank	Lane	Name	Nationality	Time	Notes
1	4	Benedetta Pilato	Italy	29.30	Q, WR
2	3	Yuliya Yefimova	Russia	30.25	Q
3	5	Ida Hulkko	Finland	30.39	q
4	7	Veera Kivirinta	Finland	30.76	q
5	6	Rosey Metz	Netherlands	30.90	
6	2	Alina Zmushka	Belarus	30.91	
7	1	Anna Sztankovics	Hungary	31.04	
8	8	Lisa Mamie	Switzerland	31.51	

=== Final ===
The final was held on 23 May at 18:10.

Rank	Lane	Name	Nationality	Time	Notes
1st place, gold medalist(s)	4	Benedetta Pilato	Italy	29.35	
2nd place, silver medalist(s)	6	Ida Hulkko	Finland	30.19	NR
3rd place, bronze medalist(s)	5	Yuliya Yefimova	Russia	30.22	
4	3	Sarah Vasey	Great Britain	30.23	
5	7	Sophie Hansson	Sweden	30.31	
6	2	Arianna Castiglioni	Italy	30.35	
7	1	Veera Kivirinta	Finland	30.72	
8	8	Tatiana Belonogoff	Russia	30.77	
