= Swimming at the 2020 European Aquatics Championships – Women's 100 metre breaststroke =

Swimming competition

Women's 100 metre breaststroke at the 2020 European Aquatics Championships
- Venue: Danube Arena
- Dates: 18 May 2021 (heats and semifinals); 19 May 2021 (final)
- Competitors: 60 from 30 nations
- Winning time: 1:05.69

Medalists
gold medal	Sophie Hansson	Sweden
silver medal	Arianna Castiglioni	Italy
bronze medal	Martina Carraro	Italy

The women's 100 metre breaststroke competition of the 2020 European Aquatics Championships was held on 18 and 19 May 2021.

== Records ==
Before the competition, the existing world, European and championship records were as follows.

	Name	Nationality	Time	Location	Date
World record	Lilly King	United States	1:04.13	Budapest	25 July 2017
European record	Rūta Meilutytė	Lithuania	1:04.35	Barcelona	29 July 2013
Championship record	Yuliya Yefimova	Russia	1:05.53	Glasgow	5 August 2018

== Results ==
=== Heats ===
The heats were started on 18 May at 10:19.

Rank	Heat	Lane	Name	Nationality	Time	Notes
1	6	5	Arianna Castiglioni	Italy	1:05.98	Q
2	5	4	Martina Carraro	Italy	1:06.26	Q
3	4	5	Sophie Hansson	Sweden	1:06.34	Q
3	4	4	Benedetta Pilato	Italy	1:06.34	
5	3	7	Emelie Fast	Sweden	1:06.64	Q
6	5	5	Evgeniia Chikunova	Russia	1:06.76	Q
7	5	3	Sarah Vasey	Great Britain	1:06.85	Q
8	4	3	Lisa Mamie	Switzerland	1:06.86	Q
9	5	6	Molly Renshaw	Great Britain	1:06.93	Q
10	6	4	Yuliya Yefimova	Russia	1:06.97	Q
10	6	3	Mona McSharry	Ireland	1:06.97	Q
12	6	6	Jessica Vall	Spain	1:07.03	Q
13	5	7	Lisa Angiolini	Italy	1:07.04	
14	6	2	Eneli Jefimova	Estonia	1:07.15	Q
15	4	2	Ida Hulkko	Finland	1:07.25	Q
16	6	7	Tes Schouten	Netherlands	1:07.45	Q
17	4	6	Tatiana Belonogoff	Russia	1:07.65	
18	4	9	Anastasia Gorbenko	Israel	1:07.67	Q, NR
19	3	2	Maria Romanjuk	Estonia	1:08.09	QSO
19	6	1	Kotryna Teterevkova	Lithuania	1:08.09	QSO
21	4	7	Jessica Steiger	Germany	1:08.31	
22	4	0	Dominika Sztandera	Poland	1:08.52	
23	2	2	Veera Kivirinta	Finland	1:08.59	
23	6	0	Rosey Metz	Netherlands	1:08.59	
25	3	3	Marina García Urzainqui	Spain	1:08.69	
26	6	8	Petra Halmai	Hungary	1:08.70	
27	3	0	Viktoriya Zeynep Güneş	Turkey	1:08.83	
28	1	5	Klara Thormalm	Sweden	1:08.92	
29	2	6	Clara Rybak-Andersen	Denmark	1:08.99	
29	5	2	Maria Temnikova	Russia	1:08.99	
31	4	8	Ema Rajić	Croatia	1:09.01	
31	4	1	Tjaša Vozel	Slovenia	1:09.01	
33	3	5	Thea Blomsterberg	Denmark	1:09.10	
34	5	9	Bente Fischer	Germany	1:09.32	
35	5	8	Diana Petkova	Bulgaria	1:09.34	
36	2	4	Andrea Podmaníková	Slovakia	1:09.38	
37	2	0	Anastasia Basisto	Moldova	1:09.49	
38	2	3	Josephine Dumont	Belgium	1:09.61	
39	5	1	Jenna Laukkanen	Finland	1:09.62	
40	3	6	Kristýna Horská	Czech Republic	1:09.64	
41	2	7	Eva Kummen	Norway	1:09.86	
42	3	1	Hannah Brunzell	Sweden	1:09.93	
43	1	4	Victoria Kaminskaya	Portugal	1:10.03	
44	2	9	Raquel Pereira	Portugal	1:10.04	
45	6	9	Anna Sztankovics	Hungary	1:10.19	
46	5	0	Eszter Békési	Hungary	1:10.36	
47	1	7	Stina Kajsa Colleou	Norway	1:10.43	
48	1	6	Hazal Özkan	Turkey	1:10.44	
49	1	0	Ana Blažević	Croatia	1:10.57	
50	3	8	Lea Polonsky	Israel	1:10.60	
51	1	8	Maria Drasidou	Greece	1:10.80	
52	2	8	Arina Sisojeva	Latvia	1:10.91	
53	3	4	Laura Lahtinen	Finland	1:10.93	
54	1	1	Alíz Kalmár	Hungary	1:10.95	
55	1	3	Nina Vadovičová	Slovakia	1:10.97	
56	1	2	Nikoleta Trníková	Slovakia	1:11.14	
57	2	5	Kim Herkle	Germany	1:11.57	
58	3	9	Fleur Vermeiren	Belgium	1:11.84	
59	1	9	Nàdia Tudó	Andorra	1:14.41	
	2	1	Alina Tkachenko	Ukraine	Disqualified	

==== Swim-off ====
The swim-off was held on 18 May at 11:19.

Rank	Lane	Name	Nationality	Time	Notes
1	5	Kotryna Teterevkova	Lithuania	1:07.33	Q
2	4	Maria Romanjuk	Estonia	1:07.68	

=== Semifinals ===
The semifinals were held on 18 May at 18:31.

==== Semifinal 1 ====
Rank	Lane	Name	Nationality	Time	Notes
1	4	Martina Carraro	Italy	1:06.09	Q
2	6	Molly Renshaw	Great Britain	1:06.21	Q, NR
3	2	Mona McSharry	Ireland	1:06.42	q
4	7	Eneli Jefimova	Estonia	1:06.47	q, NR
5	3	Sarah Vasey	Great Britain	1:06.53	q
6	8	Kotryna Teterevkova	Lithuania	1:07.36	
7	1	Tes Schouten	Netherlands	1:07.39	
8	5	Emelie Fast	Sweden	1:07.85	

==== Semifinal 2 ====
Rank	Lane	Name	Nationality	Time	Notes
1	5	Sophie Hansson	Sweden	1:05.69	Q, NR
2	4	Arianna Castiglioni	Italy	1:06.24	Q
2	2	Yuliya Yefimova	Russia	1:06.24	Q
4	3	Evgeniia Chikunova	Russia	1:06.60	
5	1	Ida Hulkko	Finland	1:06.73	NR
6	8	Anastasia Gorbenko	Israel	1:06.74	NR
7	6	Lisa Mamie	Switzerland	1:06.77	
8	7	Jessica Vall	Spain	1:06.93	

=== Final ===
The final was held on 19 May at 18:25.

Rank	Lane	Name	Nationality	Time	Notes
1st place, gold medalist(s)	4	Sophie Hansson	Sweden	1:05.69	=NR
2nd place, silver medalist(s)	6	Arianna Castiglioni	Italy	1:06.13	
3rd place, bronze medalist(s)	5	Martina Carraro	Italy	1:06.21	
4	2	Yuliya Yefimova	Russia	1:06.33	
5	3	Molly Renshaw	Great Britain	1:06.35	
6	8	Sarah Vasey	Great Britain	1:06.42	
7	7	Mona McSharry	Ireland	1:06.58	
8	1	Eneli Jefimova	Estonia	1:06.83	
