= Belgium at the 2023 World Aquatics Championships =

- Flag of Belgium
- FINA code: BEL
- National federation: Royal Belgian Swimming Federation
- Website: belswim.be (in Dutch)

in Fukuoka, Japan
- Competitors: 14 in 3 sports
- Medals: Gold 0 Silver 0 Bronze 0 Total 0

World Aquatics Championships appearances
- 1973; 1975; 1978; 1982; 1986; 1991; 1994; 1998; 2001; 2003; 2005; 2007; 2009; 2011; 2013; 2015; 2017; 2019; 2022; 2023; 2024

Belgium is set to compete at the 2023 World Aquatics Championships in Fukuoka, Japan from 14 to 30 July.

== Artistic swimming ==
Mixed

Athlete	Event	Preliminaries		Final	
Athlete	Event	Points	Rank	Points	Rank
Renaud Barral; Lisa Ingenito	Duet technical routine	170.9367	10 Q	189.2567	11
Renaud Barral; Lisa Ingenito	Duet free routine	147.1521	7 Q	144.7812	7

== Open water swimming ==
Belgium entered 1 open water swimmer.

Men

Athlete	Event	Time	Rank
Logan Vanhuys	Men's 5 km	56:43.2	14
Logan Vanhuys	Men's 10 km	1:54:03.1	18

== Swimming ==
Belgium entered 12 swimmers.

Men

Athlete	Event	Heat		Semifinal		Final	
Athlete	Event	Time	Rank	Time	Rank	Time	Rank
Noah De Schryver	200 metre breaststroke	2:12.63	24	Did not advance			
Lucas Henveaux	200 metre freestyle	1:46.40	7 Q	1:46.77	15	Did not advance	
Lucas Henveaux	400 metre freestyle	3:47.88	13	—		Did not advance	

Women

Athlete	Event	Heat		Semifinal		Final	
Athlete	Event	Time	Rank	Time	Rank	Time	Rank
Valentine Dumont	200 metre freestyle	1:58.23	16 Q	1:57.97	13	Did not advance	
Valentine Dumont	400 metre freestyle	4:10.09	15	—		Did not advance	
Florine Gaspard	50 metre breaststroke	30.75	16 Q	30.67	15	Did not advance	
Florine Gaspard	100 metre breaststroke	1:08.34	27	Did not advance			
Alisée Pisane	800 metre freestyle	8:32.52 NR	14	—		Did not advance	
Alisée Pisane	1500 metre freestyle	16:25.15	18	—		Did not advance	
Roos Vanotterdijk	50 metre freestyle	25.74	37	Did not advance			
Roos Vanotterdijk	100 metre freestyle	55.89	28	Did not advance			
Roos Vanotterdijk	50 metre backstroke	28.69	29	Did not advance			
Roos Vanotterdijk	100 metre backstroke	1:00.95	22	Did not advance			
Fleur Vermeiren	50 metre breaststroke	30.73	15 Q	31.26	16	Did not advance	
Valentine Dumont; Fleur Verdonck; Lana Ravelingien; Lotte Vanhauwaert	4 × 200 m freestyle relay	8:06.94	17	—		Did not advance	
Fleur Verdonck; Florine Gaspard; Roos Vanotterdijk; Valentine Dumont	4 × 100 m medley relay	4:04.54 NR	15	—		Did not advance	

Mixed

Athlete	Event	Heat		Final	
Athlete	Event	Time	Rank	Time	Rank
Stan Franckx; Florine Gaspard; Valentine Dumont; Lucas Henveaux	4 × 100 m medley relay	3:54.06	20	Did not advance	
