= Belgium at the 2019 World Aquatics Championships =

- Flag of Belgium
- World Aquatics code: BEL
- National federation: Royal Belgian Swimming Union
- Website: belswim.be (in Dutch)

in Gwangju, South Korea
- Medals: Gold 0 Silver 0 Bronze 0 Total 0

World Aquatics Championships appearances
- 1973; 1975; 1978; 1982; 1986; 1991; 1994; 1998; 2001; 2003; 2005; 2007; 2009; 2011; 2013; 2015; 2017; 2019; 2022; 2023; 2024; 2025

Belgium competed at the 2019 World Aquatics Championships in Gwangju, South Korea from 12 to 28 July.

== Open water swimming ==
Belgium qualified one male open water swimmer.

Athlete	Event	Time	Rank
Logan Vanhuys	Men's 10 km	1:48:17.5	15

== Swimming ==
Belgium entered 10 swimmers.

Men

Athlete	Event	Heat		Semifinal		Final	
Athlete	Event	Time	Rank	Time	Rank	Time	Rank
Louis Croenen	200 m butterfly	1:56.35	6 Q	1:59.12	15	did not advance	
Pieter Timmers	50 m freestyle	22.32	20	did not advance			
Pieter Timmers	100 m freestyle	48.76	=14 Q	48.91	16	did not advance	
Sebastien De Meulemeester; Jasper Aerents; Thomas Thijs; Pieter Timmers	4 × 100 m freestyle relay	3:15.34	14	—N/a		did not advance	
Louis Croenen; Alexandre Marcourt; Thomas Thijs; Sebastien De Meulemeester	4 × 200 m freestyle relay	7:12.99	13	—N/a		did not advance	

Women

Athlete	Event	Heat		Semifinal		Final	
Athlete	Event	Time	Rank	Time	Rank	Time	Rank
Kimberly Buys	50 m butterfly	26.23	14 Q	26.51	16	did not advance	
Kimberly Buys	100 m butterfly	59.26	25	did not advance			
Valentine Dumont	100 m freestyle	54.90	27	did not advance			
Valentine Dumont	200 m freestyle	1:59.11	=15 Q	1:58.78	15	did not advance	
Valentine Dumont	400 m freestyle	4:12.92	18	—N/a		did not advance	
Valentine Dumont	200 m butterfly	2:13.78	24	did not advance			
Fanny Lecluyse	50 m breaststroke	31.42	18	did not advance			
Fanny Lecluyse	100 m breaststroke	1:07.27	9 Q	1:06.97; SO: 1:07.22	17	did not advance	
Fanny Lecluyse	200 m breaststroke	2:25.05	7 Q	2:23.76	6 Q	2:25.23	7
Fleur Vermeiren	50 m breaststroke	31.36	16 Q	31.74	16	did not advance	
