= Belgium at the 2024 World Aquatics Championships =

- Flag of Belgium
- FINA code: BEL
- National federation: Royal Belgian Swimming Federation
- Website: belswim.be (in Dutch)

in Doha, Qatar
- Competitors: 11 in 3 sports
- Medals: Gold 0 Silver 0 Bronze 0 Total 0

World Aquatics Championships appearances
- 1973; 1975; 1978; 1982; 1986; 1991; 1994; 1998; 2001; 2003; 2005; 2007; 2009; 2011; 2013; 2015; 2017; 2019; 2022; 2023; 2024

Belgium competed at the 2024 World Aquatics Championships in Doha, Qatar from 2 to 18 February.

== Competitors ==
The following is the list of competitors in the Championships.

Sport	Men	Women	Total
Artistic swimming	1	0	1
Open water swimming	1	0	1
Swimming	1	8	9
Total	3	8	11

== Artistic swimming ==
Men

Athlete	Event	Preliminaries		Final	
Athlete	Event	Points	Rank	Points	Rank
Renaud Barral	Solo technical routine	167.4516	12 Q	166.4566	12
Renaud Barral	Solo free routine	118.8895	8 Q	117.4333	8

== Open water swimming ==
Men

Athlete	Event	Time	Rank
Logan Vanhuys	Men's 5 km	53:23.4	22
Logan Vanhuys	Men's 10 km	1:51:25.0	33

== Swimming ==
Belgium entered 9 swimmers.

Men

Athlete	Event	Heat		Semifinal		Final	
Athlete	Event	Time	Rank	Time	Rank	Time	Rank
Lucas Henveaux	200 metre freestyle	1:46.93	9 Q	1:46.75	11	Did not advance	
Lucas Henveaux	400 metre freestyle	3:46.15 NR	7 Q	—		3:44.61 NR	5
Lucas Henveaux	800 metre freestyle	7:52.10 NR	19	—		Did not advance	

Women

Athlete	Event	Heat		Semifinal		Final	
Athlete	Event	Time	Rank	Time	Rank	Time	Rank
Valentine Dumont	200 metre freestyle	1:58.40	11 Q	1:58.57	13	Did not advance	
Valentine Dumont	400 metre freestyle	4:10.96	13	—		Did not advance	
Lucie Hanquet	1500 metre freestyle	16:48.23	21	—		Did not advance	
Grace Palmer	200 metre breaststroke	2:29.03	18	Did not advance			
Alisée Pisane	800 metre freestyle	8:45.28	18	—		Did not advance	
Alisée Pisane	1500 metre freestyle	16:37.91	19	—		Did not advance	
Roos Vanotterdijk	50 metre backstroke	28.98	24	Did not advance			
Roos Vanotterdijk	50 metre butterfly	26.47	17	Did not advance			
Fleur Vermeiren	50 metre breaststroke	31.08	14 Q	31.60	16	Did not advance	
Valentine Dumont; Camille Henveaux; Lucie Hanquet; Lotte Vanhauwaert	4 × 200 m freestyle relay	8:06.56	15	—		Did not advance	
