= Belgium at the 2022 World Aquatics Championships =

- Flag of Belgium
- World Aquatics code: BEL
- National federation: Royal Belgian Swimming Union
- Website: belswim.be (in Dutch)

in Budapest, Hungary
- Competitors: 5 in 2 sports
- Medals: Gold 0 Silver 0 Bronze 0 Total 0

World Aquatics Championships appearances
- 1973; 1975; 1978; 1982; 1986; 1991; 1994; 1998; 2001; 2003; 2005; 2007; 2009; 2011; 2013; 2015; 2017; 2019; 2022; 2023; 2024; 2025

Belgium competed at the 2022 World Aquatics Championships in Budapest, Hungary from 17 June to 3 July.

== Open water swimming ==
Belgium qualified one male open water swimmer.

Athlete	Event	Time	Rank
Logan Vanhuys	Men's 10 km	1:53:24.5	10

== Swimming ==
Belgium entered 4 swimmers.

Men

Athlete	Event	Heat		Semifinal		Final	
Athlete	Event	Time	Rank	Time	Rank	Time	Rank
Louis Croenen	100 m butterfly	53.38	36	did not advance			
Louis Croenen	200 m butterfly	1:57.63	20	did not advance			

Women

Athlete	Event	Heat		Semifinal		Final	
Athlete	Event	Time	Rank	Time	Rank	Time	Rank
Valentine Dumont	100 m freestyle	55.14	20	did not advance			
Valentine Dumont	200 m freestyle	1:58.86	17	did not advance			
Valentine Dumont	400 m freestyle	4:13.33	20	—N/a		did not advance	
Florine Gaspard	50 m breaststroke	31.10	17	did not advance			
Florine Gaspard	100 m breaststroke	1:09.22	26	did not advance			
Fleur Vermeiren	50 m breaststroke	30.70	=9 Q	30.98	15	did not advance	
