= Belgium at the 2011 World Aquatics Championships =

Sporting event delegation

- Flag of Belgium
- World Aquatics code: BEL
- National federation: Koninklijke Belgische Zwembond
- Website: www.belswim.be

in Shanghai, China
- Competitors: 12 in 2 sports
- Medals: Gold 0 Silver 0 Bronze 0 Total 0

World Aquatics Championships appearances
- 1973; 1975; 1978; 1982; 1986; 1991; 1994; 1998; 2001; 2003; 2005; 2007; 2009; 2011; 2013; 2015; 2017; 2019; 2022; 2023; 2024; 2025

Belgium competed at the 2011 World Aquatics Championships in Shanghai, China between July 16 and 31, 2011.

== Open water swimming ==
Men

Athlete	Event	Final	
Athlete	Event	Time	Position
Tom Vangeneugden	Men's 10km	1:54:43.5	12
Tom Vangeneugden	Men's 25km	DNS	
Brian Ryckeman	Men's 10km	1:54:36.1	7
Brian Ryckeman	Men's 25km	DNS	

== Swimming ==
Belgium qualified 8 swimmers.

Men

Athlete	Event	Heats		Semifinals		Final	
Athlete	Event	Time	Rank	Time	Rank	Time	Rank
Jasper Aerents	Men's 50m Freestyle	22.73	30	did not advance			
Jasper Aerents	Men's 100m Freestyle	49.75	31	did not advance			
Glenn Surgeloose	Men's 200m Freestyle	1:48.96	26	did not advance			
Francois Heersbrandt	Men's 50m Butterfly	23.73	11 Q	23.68	13	did not advance	
Francois Heersbrandt	Men's 100m Butterfly	52.65	17	did not advance			
Yoris Grandjean; Glenn Surgeloose; Jasper Aerents; Pieter Timmers	Men's 4 × 100 m Freestyle Relay	DSQ				did not advance	
Dieter Dekoninck; Glenn Surgeloose; Mathieu Fonteyn; Pieter Timmers	Men's 4 × 200 m Freestyle Relay	7:17.39	13			did not advance	

Women

Athlete	Event	Heats		Semifinals		Final	
Athlete	Event	Time	Rank	Time	Rank	Time	Rank
Kimberly Buys	Women's 100m Backstroke	1:02.48	28	did not advance			
Kimberly Buys	Women's 200m Backstroke	2:13.01	22	did not advance			
Kimberly Buys	Women's 100m Butterfly	59.88	31	did not advance			
Kim Janssens	Women's 100m Breaststroke	1:09.25	20	did not advance			
Fanny Lecluyse	Women's 200m Breaststroke	2:27.67	14 Q	2:25.92	10	did not advance	
Fanny Lecluyse	Women's 200m IM	2:14.97	16 Q	2:13.68	14	did not advance	
