= Belgium at the 2015 World Aquatics Championships =

- Flag of Belgium
- FINA code: BEL
- National federation: Koninklijke Belgische Zwembond
- Website: www.belswim.be

in Kazan, Russia
- Competitors: 11 in 2 sports
- Medals: Gold 0 Silver 0 Bronze 0 Total 0

World Aquatics Championships appearances
- 1973; 1975; 1978; 1982; 1986; 1991; 1994; 1998; 2001; 2003; 2005; 2007; 2009; 2011; 2013; 2015; 2017; 2019; 2022; 2023; 2024

Belgium competed at the 2015 World Aquatics Championships in Kazan, Russia from 24 July to 9 August 2015.

== Open water swimming ==
Belgium has qualified one swimmer to compete in the open water marathon.

Athlete	Event	Time	Rank
Brian Ryckeman	Men's 10 km	did not start	

== Swimming ==
Belgian swimmers have achieved qualifying standards in the following events (up to a maximum of 2 swimmers in each event at the A-standard entry time, and 1 at the B-standard):

Men

Athlete	Event	Heat		Semifinal		Final	
Athlete	Event	Time	Rank	Time	Rank	Time	Rank
Jasper Aerents	50 m freestyle	22.67	=27	did not advance			
Jasper Aerents	100 m freestyle	49.24	22	did not advance			
Louis Croenen	100 m butterfly	DNS		did not advance			
Louis Croenen	200 m butterfly	1:56.33	12 Q	1:55.49	7 Q	1:55.39	7
François Heersbrandt	50 m freestyle	22.48	=17	did not advance			
François Heersbrandt	50 m backstroke	25.55	26	did not advance			
François Heersbrandt	50 m butterfly	23.59	12 Q	23.34	10	did not advance	
Lander Hendrickx	400 m freestyle	3:51.61	31	—		did not advance	
Pieter Timmers	100 m freestyle	48.58	6 Q	48.22	4 Q	48.31	=7
Pieter Timmers	200 m freestyle	1:48.43	25	did not advance			
Jasper Aerents; Emmanuel Vanluchenne; Pieter Timmers; Glenn Surgeloose	4 × 100 m freestyle relay	3:15.50	9	—		did not advance	
Louis Croenen; Glenn Surgeloose; Dieter Dekoninck; Pieter Timmers	4 × 200 m freestyle relay	7:10.92	8 Q	—		7:09.64	6

Women

Athlete	Event	Heat		Semifinal		Final	
Athlete	Event	Time	Rank	Time	Rank	Time	Rank
Kimberly Buys	100 m freestyle	55.66	31	did not advance			
Kimberly Buys	200 m freestyle	2:02.54	40	did not advance			
Kimberly Buys	50 m butterfly	26.28	10 Q	26.43	16	did not advance	
Kimberly Buys	100 m butterfly	58.36	13 Q	59.08	16	did not advance	
Fanny Lecluyse	50 m breaststroke	30.75	7 Q	31.04	=10	did not advance	
Fanny Lecluyse	100 m breaststroke	1:07.29	11 Q	1:07.75	15	did not advance	
Fanny Lecluyse	200 m breaststroke	2:23.77 NR	4 Q	2:23.83	10	did not advance	
