= Belgium at the 2013 World Aquatics Championships =

- Flag of Belgium
- World Aquatics code: BEL
- National federation: Koninklijke Belgische Zwembond
- Website: www.belswim.be

in Barcelona, Spain
- Competitors: 11 in 2 sports
- Medals Ranked 24th: Gold 0 Silver 1 Bronze 0 Total 1

World Aquatics Championships appearances
- 1973; 1975; 1978; 1982; 1986; 1991; 1994; 1998; 2001; 2003; 2005; 2007; 2009; 2011; 2013; 2015; 2017; 2019; 2022; 2023; 2024; 2025

Belgium competed at the 2013 World Aquatics Championships in Barcelona, Spain between 19 July and 4 August 2013.

== Medalists ==
Medal	Name	Sport	Event	Date
Silver	Brian Ryckeman	Open water swimming	Men's 25 km	27 July

== Open water swimming ==
Belgium qualified a single quota in open water swimming.

Athlete	Event	Time	Rank
Brian Ryckeman	Men's 10 km	1:49:29.3	11
Brian Ryckeman	Men's 25 km	4:47:27.4	2nd place, silver medalist(s)

== Swimming ==
Belgian swimmers earned qualifying standards in the following events (up to a maximum of 2 swimmers in each event at the A-standard entry time, and 1 at the B-standard):

Men

Athlete	Event	Heat		Semifinal		Final	
Athlete	Event	Time	Rank	Time	Rank	Time	Rank
Ward Bauwens	400 m freestyle	3:53.60	23	—N/a		Did not advance	
Ward Bauwens	200 m individual medley	2:03.24	33	Did not advance			
Ward Bauwens	400 m individual medley	4:25.07	27	—N/a		Did not advance	
Louis Croenen	50 m backstroke	DNS		Did not advance			
Yoris Grandjean	50 m freestyle	22.85	33	Did not advance			
Yoris Grandjean	50 m butterfly	23.68	20	Did not advance			
François Heersbrandt	50 m butterfly	23.75	22	Did not advance			
François Heersbrandt	100 m butterfly	52.75	18	Did not advance			
Glenn Surgeloose	200 m freestyle	1:49.04	25	Did not advance			
Pieter Timmers	100 m freestyle	48.76	8 Q	48.65	12	Did not advance	
Pieter Timmers	200 m freestyle	1:47.89	8 Q	1:47.99	15	Did not advance	
Jasper Aerents; Dieter Dekoninck; Glenn Surgeloose; Emmanuel Vanluchenne	4 × 100 m freestyle relay	3:15.52	9	—N/a		Did not advance	
Dieter Dekoninck; Glenn Surgeloose; Pieter Timmers; Emmanuel Vanluchenne	4 × 200 m freestyle relay	7:10.69 NR	5 Q	—N/a		7:11.15	7

Women

Athlete	Event	Heat		Semifinal		Final	
Athlete	Event	Time	Rank	Time	Rank	Time	Rank
Kimberly Buys	100 m freestyle	55.68 NR	25	Did not advance			
Kimberly Buys	50 m backstroke	29.16	27	Did not advance			
Kimberly Buys	100 m backstroke	1:01.35	17 Q	1:01.24	15	Did not advance	
Kimberly Buys	50 m butterfly	26.35	10 Q	26.48	15	Did not advance	
Kimberly Buys	100 m butterfly	59.28	19	Did not advance			
Kim Janssens	50 m breaststroke	31.52 NR	18	Did not advance			
Kim Janssens	100 m breaststroke	1:08.36 NR	16 Q	1:08.73	16	Did not advance	
