= Swimming at the 2019 World Aquatics Championships – Women's 50 metre breaststroke =

Women's 50 metre breaststroke at the 2019 World Aquatics Championships
- Venue: Nambu University Municipal Aquatics Center
- Location: Gwangju, South Korea
- Dates: 27 July (heats and semifinals); 28 July (final)
- Competitors: 56 from 51 nations
- Winning time: 29.84

Medalists
| gold medal | Lilly King | United States |
| silver medal | Benedetta Pilato | Italy |
| bronze medal | Yuliya Yefimova | Russia |

The Women's 50 metre breaststroke competition at the 2019 World Championships was held on 27 and 28 July 2019.

== Records ==
Prior to the competition, the existing world and championship records were as follows.

| World record | Lilly King (USA) | 29.40 | Budapest, Hungary | 30 July 2017 |
| Competition record | Lilly King (USA) | 29.40 | Budapest, Hungary | 30 July 2017 |

== Results ==
=== Heats ===
The heats were held on 27 July at 10:40.

| Rank | Heat | Lane | Name | Nationality | Time | Notes |
|---|---|---|---|---|---|---|
| 1 | 4 | 4 | Benedetta Pilato | Italy | 29.98 | Q, NR |
| 2 | 6 | 4 | Lilly King | United States | 30.18 | Q |
| 3 | 5 | 5 | Martina Carraro | Italy | 30.38 | Q |
| 4 | 6 | 5 | Alia Atkinson | Jamaica | 30.53 | Q |
| 5 | 5 | 4 | Yuliya Yefimova | Russia | 30.63 | Q |
| 6 | 6 | 6 | Jessica Hansen | Australia | 30.69 | Q |
| 7 | 6 | 3 | Alina Zmushka | Belarus | 30.71 | Q |
| 8 | 4 | 5 | Ida Hulkko | Finland | 30.72 | Q |
| 9 | 5 | 3 | Sophie Hansson | Sweden | 30.96 | Q |
| 10 | 6 | 1 | Rosey Metz | Netherlands | 30.99 | Q |
| 11 | 6 | 2 | Tes Schouten | Netherlands | 31.03 | Q |
| 12 | 4 | 2 | Anna Sztankovics | Hungary | 31.13 | Q |
| 13 | 4 | 3 | Anna Belousova | Russia | 31.20 | Q |
| 13 | 5 | 7 | Suo Ran | China | 31.20 | Q |
| 15 | 5 | 8 | Anna Elendt | Germany | 31.24 | Q |
| 16 | 4 | 7 | Fleur Vermeiren | Belgium | 31.36 | Q |
| 17 | 5 | 6 | Tatjana Schoenmaker | South Africa | 31.40 | |
| 18 | 6 | 7 | Fanny Lecluyse | Belgium | 31.42 | |
| 19 | 5 | 2 | Jenna Laukkanen | Finland | 31.48 | |
| 20 | 6 | 9 | Kotryna Teterevkova | Lithuania | 31.53 | |
| 21 | 4 | 6 | Jessica Vall | Spain | 31.58 | |
| 21 | 4 | 9 | Maria Romanjuk | Estonia | 31.58 | |
| 23 | 3 | 3 | Jamie Yeung | Hong Kong | 31.61 | NR |
| 24 | 4 | 8 | Tatiana Chișca | Moldova | 31.68 | |
| 25 | 4 | 0 | Lisa Mamie | Switzerland | 31.70 | |
| 26 | 5 | 9 | Adelaida Pchelintseva | Kazakhstan | 31.94 | |
| 27 | 4 | 1 | Matilde Schroder | Denmark | 31.98 | |
| 28 | 3 | 1 | Back Su-yeon | South Korea | 32.02 | |
| 29 | 6 | 8 | Weronika Hallmann | Poland | 32.07 | |
| 30 | 5 | 1 | Niamh Coyne | Ireland | 32.12 | |
| 31 | 5 | 0 | Phee Jinq En | Malaysia | 32.23 | |
| 32 | 3 | 4 | Gülşen Samancı | Turkey | 32.28 | |
| 33 | 3 | 6 | Jenjira Srisaard | Thailand | 32.33 | |
| 34 | 3 | 2 | Tilka Paljk | Zambia | 32.37 | |
| 34 | 6 | 0 | Lin Pei-wun | Chinese Taipei | 32.37 | |
| 36 | 3 | 5 | Christie Chue | Singapore | 32.39 | |
| 36 | 3 | 7 | Ema Rajić | Croatia | 32.39 | |
| 38 | 1 | 7 | Jayla Pina | Cape Verde | 33.52 | |
| 39 | 3 | 8 | Nàdia Tudó | Andorra | 33.67 | NR |
| 40 | 3 | 0 | Kirsten Fisher-Marsters | Cook Islands | 34.44 | |
| 41 | 2 | 8 | Evita Leter | Suriname | 34.58 | |
| 42 | 3 | 9 | Naima Hazell | Saint Lucia | 34.79 | |
| 43 | 2 | 3 | Darya Semyonova | Turkmenistan | 35.33 | |
| 44 | 1 | 4 | Chinelo Iyadi | Nigeria | 35.64 | |
| 45 | 1 | 6 | Elodie Poo-cheong | Mauritius | 36.72 | |
| 46 | 1 | 3 | Naomy Grand-Pierre | Haiti | 37.02 | |
| 47 | 2 | 4 | Taeyanna Adams | Micronesia | 37.13 | |
| 48 | 2 | 5 | Siri Arun Budcharern | Laos | 40.72 | |
| 49 | 2 | 0 | Aaliyah Palestrini | Seychelles | 40.90 | |
| 50 | 2 | 1 | Sylvia Caloiaro | Tanzania | 42.30 | |
| 51 | 2 | 6 | Soukeyna Pitroipa | Burkina Faso | 44.18 | |
| 52 | 2 | 7 | Mariama Touré | Guinea | 44.35 | |
| 53 | 1 | 2 | Aichata Konate | Mali | 49.20 | |
| 54 | 1 | 5 | Pilar Ndong | Equatorial Guinea | 49.32 | |
| 55 | 2 | 2 | Safia Houssein | Djibouti | 49.56 | |
| 56 | 2 | 9 | Odrina Kaze | Burundi | 49.77 | |
| | 1 | 1 | Lina Selo | Ethiopia | DNS | |

=== Semifinals ===
The semifinals were started on 27 July at 20:26.

==== Semifinal 1 ====
| Rank | Lane | Name | Nationality | Time | Notes |
|---|---|---|---|---|---|
| 1 | 4 | Lilly King | United States | 29.84 | Q |
| 2 | 5 | Alia Atkinson | Jamaica | 30.61 | Q |
| 3 | 6 | Ida Hulkko | Finland | 30.91 | Q |
| 4 | 3 | Jessica Hansen | Australia | 30.92 | Q |
| 5 | 7 | Anna Sztankovics | Hungary | 31.41 | |
| 6 | 2 | Rosey Metz | Netherlands | 31.44 | |
| 7 | 1 | Suo Ran | China | 31.46 | |
| 8 | 8 | Fleur Vermeiren | Belgium | 31.74 | |

==== Semifinal 2 ====
| Rank | Lane | Name | Nationality | Time | Notes |
|---|---|---|---|---|---|
| 1 | 3 | Yuliya Yefimova | Russia | 30.12 | Q |
| 2 | 4 | Benedetta Pilato | Italy | 30.17 | Q |
| 3 | 5 | Martina Carraro | Italy | 30.23 | Q |
| 4 | 8 | Anna Elendt | Germany | 31.10 | Q |
| 5 | 6 | Alina Zmushka | Belarus | 31.11 | |
| 6 | 2 | Sophie Hansson | Sweden | 31.12 | |
| 7 | 7 | Tes Schouten | Netherlands | 31.31 | |
| 8 | 1 | Anna Belousova | Russia | 31.56 | |

=== Final ===
The final was held on 28 July at 20:09.

| Rank | Lane | Name | Nationality | Time | Notes |
|---|---|---|---|---|---|
| 1st place, gold medalist(s) | 4 | Lilly King | United States | 29.84 | |
| 2nd place, silver medalist(s) | 3 | Benedetta Pilato | Italy | 30.00 | |
| 3rd place, bronze medalist(s) | 5 | Yuliya Yefimova | Russia | 30.15 | |
| 4 | 2 | Alia Atkinson | Jamaica | 30.34 | |
| 5 | 6 | Martina Carraro | Italy | 30.49 | |
| 6 | 1 | Jessica Hansen | Australia | 30.84 | |
| 7 | 8 | Anna Elendt | Germany | 31.06 | |
| 8 | 7 | Ida Hulkko | Finland | 31.23 | |
