= List of Belgian flags =

"The Belgian Nation chooses red, yellow and black as its colours" – article 193 of the Belgian constitution

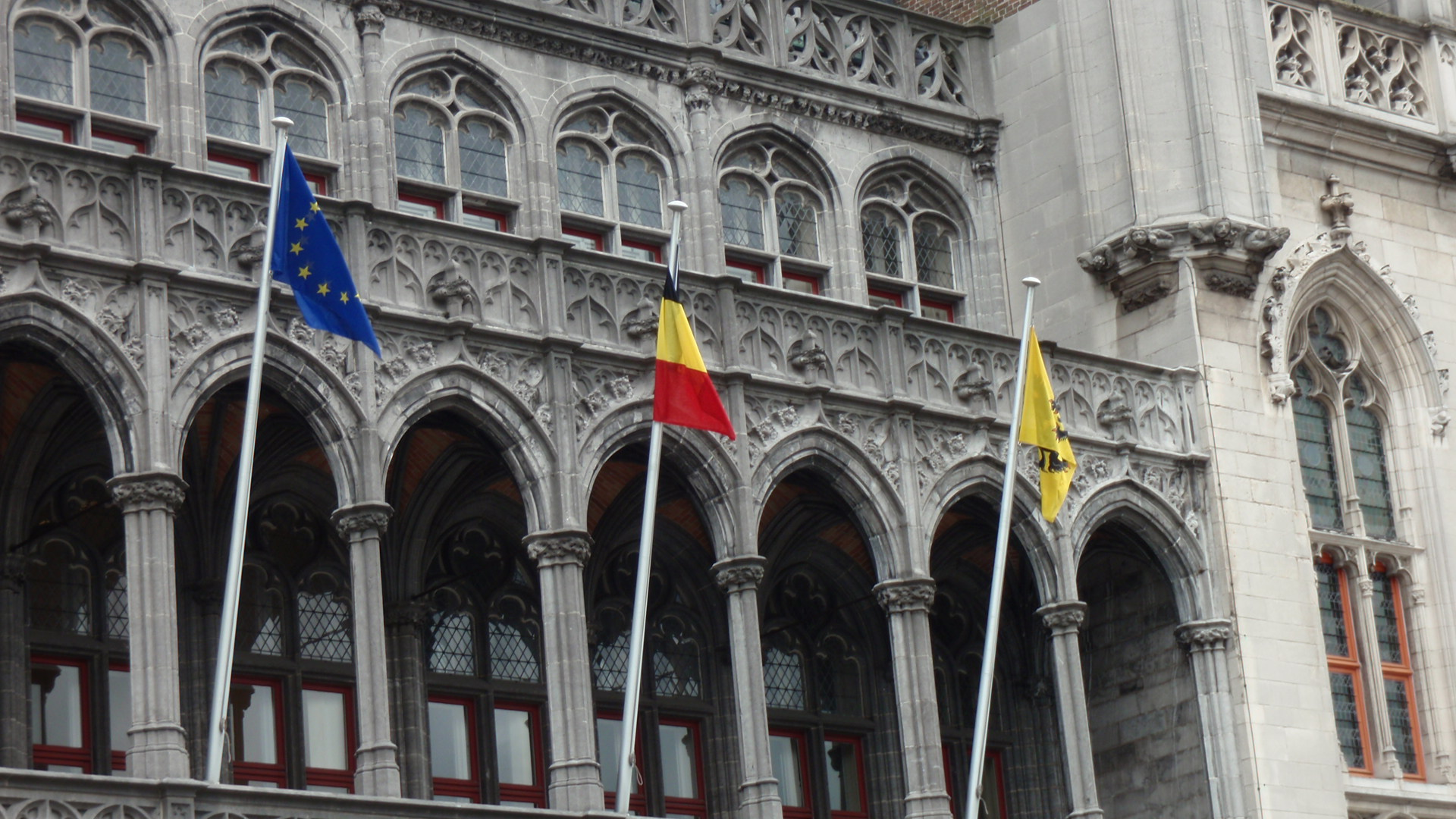
Flags on a Flemish town hall with (left to right) the European, Belgian and Flemish Community flags

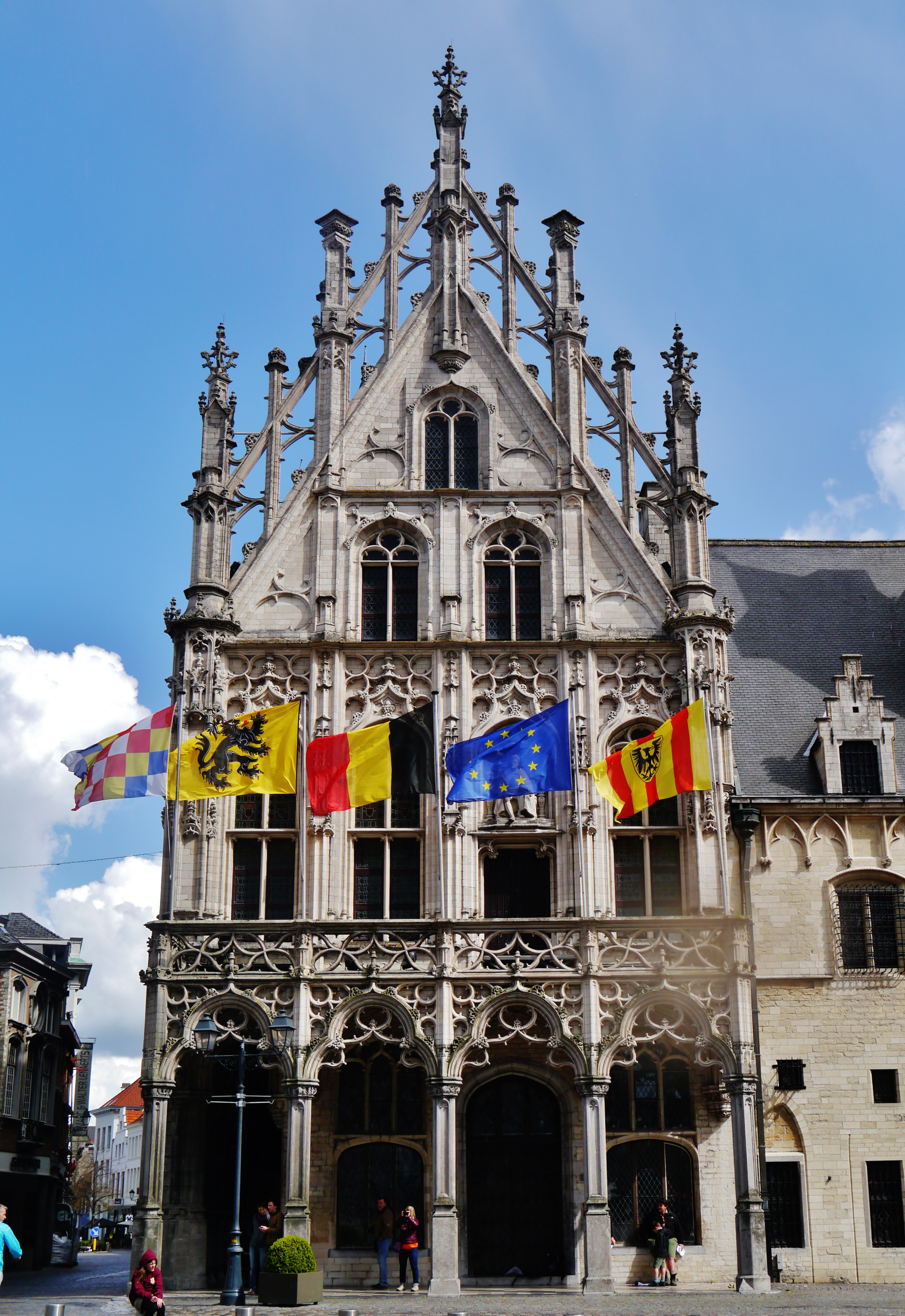
Flags on a town hall in Mechelen with (left to right) the flags of Antwerp, Flanders, Belgium, Europe and Mechelen

This is a list of flags used in Belgium.

== National flag ==
Flag	Date	Use	Description
	1831–present	Flag of Belgium	A vertical tricolour of black, yellow, and red with a 13:15 ratio. Technically the national flag, but rarely seen in the officially approved dimensions.

=== Ensign ===
Flag	Date	Use	Description
	1831–present	Civil ensign of Belgium	A vertical tricolour of black, yellow, and red with a 2:3 ratio.
	1950–present	State ensign of Belgium	A vertical tricolour of black, yellow, and red defaced by a lion rampant ensigned by a crown, both sable (black), the lion armed and langued gules (red).

=== Military ===
Flag	Date	Use	Description
	1950–present	Flag of the Belgian Army	The Army badge, crowned, on a white field.
	1950–present	Air force ensign of the Belgian Air Force	The Air Force badge and roundel on a blue field.
	1950–present	Naval ensign of the Belgian Navy	A yellow saltire on a white field, bordered above and below in red and to the left and right in black, charged on the top with a crown above crossed cannons and on the bottom by a fouled anchor.

=== Navy ===
Flag	Date	Use	Description
	1831–present	Naval jack of the Belgian Navy	A vertical tricolour of black, yellow, and red with a 1:1 ratio.
	1831–present	Pennant of the Belgian Navy	Rectangular black-yellow-red pennant with split fly
	1831–present	Commodore of Belgium	The rectangular tricolour of Belgium with split fly
	1966–present	The flag hoisted by Belgian yachts registered in yachting associations approved by the Minister, also called the "Belgian yacht ensign"	The national ensign to be hoisted by Belgian yachts is made of three equal vertical stripes of black, yellow, and red; the black stripe is placed at hoist.
	1999–present	Belgian pleasure boats often hoist the "European civil ensign"	The European Union flag with the Belgian civil ensign in canton, with a white fimbriation.
	2016–present	The civil ensign, bearing a black lion, is flown by non-naval ships with a crew partly from the Naval Reserve.	A vertical tricolour of black, yellow, and red defaced by a lion rampant, sable (black), armed and langued gules (red).
	2021–present	The Belgian Naval Auxiliary Ensign or the flag of Sovereignty ship under Belgian command	A blue background with the Belgian naval ensign in the top hoist corner, and a white fouled anchor with a crown on top in the fly.
	1957–present	Standard of the Admiral Benelux	

== Sub-national ==
=== Regions ===
Flag	Administrative division	Adopted	Description
	Flemish Region	1973	A black lion with red claws and tongue on a yellow field. Blazon: Or, a lion rampant armed and langued Gules.
	Walloon Region	1998–present	A red rooster on a yellow field.
	Brussels-Capital Region	2015	

=== Communities ===
Flag	Administrative division	Adopted	Description
	Flemish Community	1973	A black lion with red claws and tongue on a yellow field. Blazon: Or, a lion rampant armed and langued Gules.
	French Community	1991–present	A red rooster on a yellow field.
	German-speaking community	1990	

=== Provinces ===
Flag	Administrative division	Adopted	Description
	West Flanders	1997	Coveted background in 12 pieces of gold and azure, with a heart shield of gules in the middle over the whole
	East Flanders	1999	
	Antwerp	1997	
	Limburg	1996	
	Flemish Brabant	1996	
	Walloon Brabant	1995	
	Hainaut		The province does not officially have a flag
	Namur	1953	
	Liège		The province does not officially have a flag
	Luxembourg	2018	Azure and white horizontal stripes with the crowned red lion

=== Former provinces ===
Flag	Administrative division	Adopted	Description
	Brabant	1837	A golden lion (Leo Belgicus) on a black field.

=== Brussels ===
Flag	Date	Use	Description
	1991–2015	First version of Flag of Brussels-Capital Region	A blue field with a yellow iris with a white border on top.
	2015–present	Flag of the Brussels-Capital Region	
	1930–present	Flag of Brussels (city)	Emblem of Archangel Michael slaying the dragon

=== Community commissions in Brussels ===
Flag	Date	Use
	1989–present	Flag of the Common Community Commission
	1989–present	Flag of the Flemish Community Commission
	1989–present	Flag of the French Community Commission

== Royal standards ==
=== Monarch ===
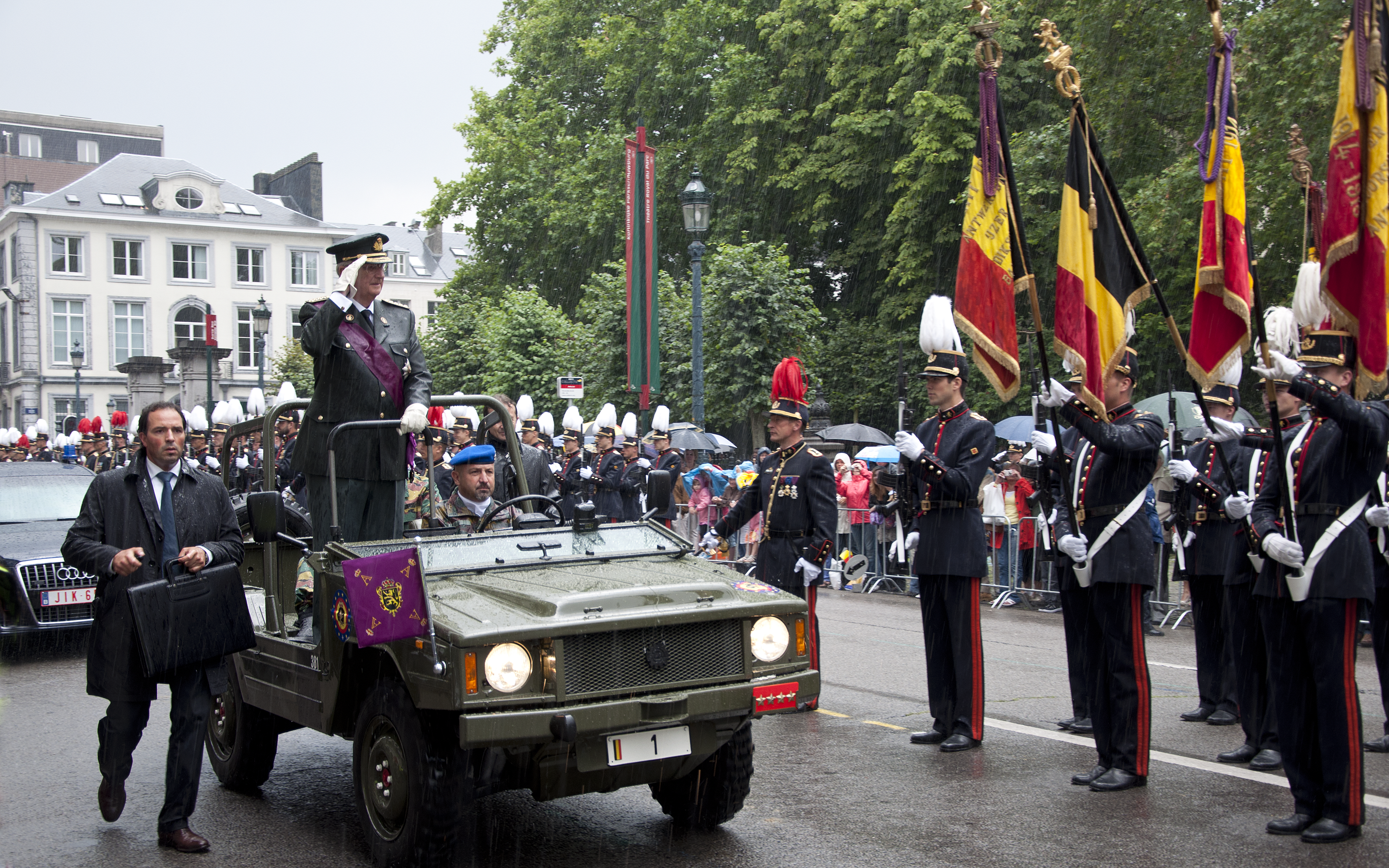
The royal standard of King Albert II

Each royal standard for a monarch is a square rouge ponceau banner of the royal arms, personalised with the king's cypher in each corner.

Flag	Date	Use
	1831–present	The Belgian flag with the royal crown
	1831–1865	Royal standard of Leopold I
	1865–1909	Royal standard of Leopold II
	1909–1934	Royal standard of Albert I
	1934–1951	Royal standard of Leopold III
	1951–1993	Royal standard of Baudouin I
	1993–2013	Royal standard of Albert II
	2013–present	Royal standard of Philippe

== Historical flags ==
Flag	Date	Use	Description
	800–888	Imperial Oriflamme of Charlemagne	A three-pointed green field with eight golden crosses and six flowers.
	862–1797	Flag of the County of Flanders	A yellow flag with a black lion in the center. "Or, a lion rampant armed and langued Gules"
	900–1477	Flag of the County of Hainaut	A yellow quartered banner with two black and two red lions.
	980–1790	Flag of the Prince-Bishopric of Liège, also of the Republic of Liège	A bicolour, with two equal vertical bands of red and yellow.
	1065–1797	Flag of the Duchy of Limburg	A white background with a red lion on it
	1183–1794	Flag of the Duchy of Brabant	A golden lion on a black field.
	1482–1714	Flag of the Spanish Netherlands	A white flag with the cross of Burgundy.
	1482–1714	Civil Ensign of the Spanish Netherlands	A horizontal tricolour of red, white, and yellow, with the Cross of Burgundy in the centre.
	1781–1786	Flag of the Austrian Netherlands	A tricolour, with three equal horizontal bands of red, white, and gold with the arms of Austria.
	1789–1790	Flag of the United Belgian States	A tricolour, with three equal horizontal bands of red, black, and yellow.
	1830–1831	Flag of the Belgian Revolution and the first Belgian flag	A tricolour, with three equal horizontal bands of black, yellow, and red.
	1831–present	Flag of Belgium	A vertical tricolour of red, yellow, and black.

=== Colonial flags ===
Flag	Date	Use	Description
	1908–1960	Flag of the Belgian Congo	A blue flag with a yellow five-pointed star previously used by the Congo Free State (1885-1908).
	1936–1960	Standard of the governor-general of the Belgian Congo	A vertical tricolour of black, yellow, and red, with a yellow star in the canton on a blue field.

=== Other historic flags ===
Flag	Date	Use	Description
	1883–1920	Flag of Neutral Moresnet	A tricolour, with three equal horizontal bands of black, white, and blue.
	1897–1899	Masthead pennant of the RV Belgica during the Belgian Antarctic Expedition of 1897–1899	A white swallowtail pennant defaced with the intertwined initials "YC" in black and gold, and two red triangles placed along the hoist.
	1722–1731	Flag of the Belgian Ostend Company (Austrian Netherlands)	

== Other ==
Flag	Date	Use	Description
	1955–present	Flag of Europe	A circle of twelve five-pointed gold (yellow) stars on a blue field.
	1957–present	Unofficial flag of Benelux	A tricolour, with three horizontal bands of red, white, and blue representing the Netherlands and Luxembourg and a black box in the middle representing Belgium. With a yellow lion in the centre.
