= Belgium at the 2017 World Aquatics Championships =

- Flag of Belgium
- World Aquatics code: BEL
- National federation: Koninklijke Belgische Zwembond
- Website: www.belswim.be

in Budapest, Hungary
- Competitors: 4 in 2 sports
- Medals: Gold 0 Silver 0 Bronze 0 Total 0

World Aquatics Championships appearances
- 1973; 1975; 1978; 1982; 1986; 1991; 1994; 1998; 2001; 2003; 2005; 2007; 2009; 2011; 2013; 2015; 2017; 2019; 2022; 2023; 2024; 2025

Belgium was scheduled to compete at the 2017 World Aquatics Championships in Budapest, Hungary from 14 July to 30 July.

== Open water swimming ==
Belgium has entered one open water swimmer

Athlete	Event	Time	Rank
Logan Vanhuys	Men's 5 km	54:54.3	13

== Swimming ==
Belgian swimmers have achieved qualifying standards in the following events (up to a maximum of 2 swimmers in each event at the A-standard entry time, and 1 at the B-standard):

Athlete	Event	Heat		Semifinal		Final	
Athlete	Event	Time	Rank	Time	Rank	Time	Rank
Louis Croenen	Men's 100 m butterfly	52.74	27	did not advance			
Louis Croenen	Men's 200 m butterfly	1:56.75	17	did not advance			
Pieter Timmers	Men's 50 m freestyle	22.47	26	did not advance			
Pieter Timmers	Men's 100 m freestyle	48.67	13 Q	48.96	16	did not advance	
Pieter Timmers	Men's 200 m freestyle	1:48.13	31	did not advance			
Kimberly Buys	Women's 50 m butterfly	25.82	9 Q	25.70	7 Q	25.78	7
Kimberly Buys	Women's 100 m butterfly	58.45	13 Q	58.49	16	did not advance	
