= List of Finnish records in swimming =

The Finnish records in swimming are the fastest ever performances of swimmers from Finland that are recognised and ratified by the Finnish Swimming Federation (Finnish: Suomen Uimaliitto).

== Long course (50 m) ==
=== Men ===
Event	Time		Name	Club	Date	Meet	Location	Ref
50 m freestyle	21.58		Ari-Pekka Liukkonen	Cetus Espoo	6 July 2017	Finnish Championships	Tampere, Finland	
100 m freestyle	49.25	h	Tomas Koski	Athens Bulldog	29 June 2025	Southern Zone South Sectional Championships	Ocala, United States	
200 m freestyle	1:46.36		Tomas Koski	Athens Bulldog	27 June 2025	Southern Zone South Sectional Championships	Ocala, United States	
400 m freestyle	3:47.45		Tomas Koski	Athens Bulldog	28 June 2025	Southern Zone South Sectional Championships	Ocala, United States	
800 m freestyle	7:54.70	h	Matias Koski	Finland	30 July 2013	World Championships	Barcelona, Spain	
1500 m freestyle	15:09.17		Matias Koski	Finland	29 March 2012	Indianapolis Grand Prix	Indianapolis, United States	
50m backstroke	25.32	h	Kalle Mäkinen	Auburn University	5 March 2026	TYR Pro Swim Series	Westmont, United States	
100m backstroke	55.48		Ajjuub Ezzat	Oly Swimming	28 March 2026	Central Zone East Spring Speedo Sectionals	Indianapolis, United States	
200m backstroke	2:00.70		Jani Sievinen	Finland	26 May 1996	International Meeting	Monaco	
200m backstroke	2:00.32	h, #	Ajjuub Ezzat	Finland	11 August 2026	European Championships	Paris, France	
50m breaststroke	27.26		Olli Kokko	Finland	16 August 2022	European Championships	Rome, Italy	
100m breaststroke	59.99	sf	Matti Mattsson	Finland	17 May 2021	European Championships	Budapest, Hungary	
200m breaststroke	2:07.13	NR	Matti Mattsson	Finland	29 July 2021	Olympic Games	Tokyo, Japan	
50m butterfly	23.50		Jere Hård	Finland	30 Jul 2002	European Championships	Berlin, Germany	
100m butterfly	53.08		Jere Hård	Finland	23 Jul 2001	World Championships	Fukuoka, Japan	
200m butterfly	1:59.32		Vesa Hanski	Finland	23 Aug 1997	European Championships	Seville, Spain	
200m individual medley	1:58.16		Jani Sievinen	Finland	11 Sep 1994	World Championships	Rome, Italy	
400m individual medley	4:13.29	NR	Jani Sievinen	Finland	8 Sep 1994	World Championships	Rome, Italy	
4×50m freestyle relay	1:32.44		Ari-Pekka Liukkonen; Toni Kurkinen; Ville Kallinen; Severi Allonen	-	10 Oct 2009	-	Jyväskylä, Finland	
4×100m freestyle relay	3:21.80		Jani Sievinen; Vesa Hanski; Janne Blomqvist; Antti Kasvio	Finland	6 Aug 1993	European Championships	Sheffield, United Kingdom	
4×200m freestyle relay	7:28.71		Finland	27 July 1992	Olympic Games	Barcelona, Spain		
4×200m freestyle relay	7:16.85	h, #	Tomas Koski (1:47.25); Ronny Brännkärr (1:49.74); Luukas Vainio (1:48.60); Ajjuub Ezzat (1:51.26)	Finland	10 August 2026	European Championships	Paris, France	
4×50m medley relay	1:39.52	NR	Sergei Haukka (26.82); Lassi Ohtonen (28.00); Tuomas Pokkinen (23.69); Ari-Pekka Liukkonen (21.01)	Cetus Espoo	22 March 2015	Grand Prix 3	Espoo, Finland	
4×100m medley relay	3:40.63		Jani Sievinen; Jarno Pihlava; Jere Hård; Matti Rajakylä	Finland	16 May 2004	European Championships	Madrid, Spain	

Legend: # – Record awaiting ratification by Finnish Swimming Association; WR – World record; ER – European record; NR – Nordic record; e – equalled existing record;
Records not set in finals: h – heat; sf – semifinal; r – relay 1st leg; rh – relay heat 1st leg; b – B final; † – en route to final mark; so – swim-off; tt – time trial

=== Women ===
Event	Time		Name	Club	Date	Meet	Location	Ref
50m freestyle	24.77		Fanny Teijonsalo	Finland	29 May 2021	Mare Nostrum	Monte Carlo, Monaco	
100m freestyle	53.60	h	Hanna-Maria Seppälä	Finland	13 Aug 2008	Olympic Games	Beijing, China	
200m freestyle	1:58.68		Hanna-Maria Seppälä	-	28 Jun 2009	Finnish Championships	Helsinki, Finland	
400m freestyle	4:16.05		Malla Hämäläinen	Finland	11 April 2026	Swim Open Stockholm	Stockholm, Sweden	
400m freestyle	4:15.92	#	Malla Hämäläinen	Vieskan Uimarit	25 June 2026	Finnish Championships	Espoo, Finland	
800m freestyle	8:44.55			Finland	11 July 2026	European Junior Championships	Munich, Germany	
800m freestyle	8:41.02	h, #	Malla Hämäläinen	Finland	10 August 2026	European Championships	Paris, France	
1500m freestyle	16:42.77		Malla Hämäläinen	Finland	9 April 2026	Swim Open Stockholm	Stockholm, Sweden	
50m backstroke	27.42	h, NR	Mimosa Jallow	Finland	4 August 2018	European Championships	Glasgow, Great Britain	
100m backstroke	1:00.06	h	Mimosa Jallow	Finland	25 July 2021	Olympic Games	Tokyo, Japan	
200m backstroke	2:12.87		Vilma Oura	Finland	29 June 2017	European Junior Championships	Netanya, Israel	
50m breaststroke	30.19		Ida Hulkko	Finland	23 May 2021	European Championships	Budapest, Hungary	
50m breaststroke	30.17	h, #	Veera Kivirinta	Finland	15 August 2026	European Championships	Paris, France	
100m breaststroke	1:06.19	h	Ida Hulkko	Finland	25 July 2021	Olympic Games	Tokyo, Japan	
200m breaststroke	2:25.14	sf	Jenna Laukkanen	Finland	10 August 2016	Olympic Games	Rio de Janeiro, Brazil	
50m butterfly	26.24	sf, =	Mimosa Jallow	Finland	8 August 2018	European Championships	Glasgow, United Kingdom	
50m butterfly	26.24	sf, =, #	Aliisa Soini	Finland	11 August 2026	European Championships	Paris, France	
100m butterfly	58.68	=	Emilia Pikkarainen	-	2013	Simmis-uinnit	Helsinki, Finland	
100m butterfly	58.68	=	Aliisa Soini	Finland	10 April 2026	Swim Open Stockholm	Stockholm, Sweden	
100m butterfly	58.55	h, #	Aliisa Soini	Finland	13 August 2026	European Championships	Paris, France	
200m butterfly	2:10.39	h	Laura Lahtinen	Finland	24 July 2019	World Championships	Gwangju, South Korea	
200m individual medley	2:14.20	h	Tanja Kylliäinen	Cardinal Aquatics	14 November 2015	Arena Pro Series Minneapolis	Minneapolis, United States	
400m individual medley	4:45.33	h	Tanja Kylliäinen	Finland	6 August 2016	Olympic Games	Rio de Janeiro, Brazil	
4×50m freestyle relay	1:43.37		Jenni Moisio (27.01); Marlene Niemi (25.69); Mimosa Jallow (24.25); Susanne Hirvonen (26.42)	Kampuksen Plaani	5 May 2018	Tampere Open Championships	Tampere, Finland	
4×100m freestyle relay	3:42.98	h	Linda Laihorinne (56.63); Emilia Pikkarainen (56.50); Riia-Rosa Koskelainen (56.02); Hanna-Maria Seppälä (53.83)	Finland	26 Jul 2009	World Championships	Rome, Italy	
4×200m freestyle relay	8:21.90		Fanny Teijonsalo (2:06.42); Noora Laukkanen (2:05.89); Aino Otava (2:04.20); Hanna-Maria Seppälä (2:05.39)	Cetus	22 April 2015	Finnish Championships	Vaasa, Finland	
4×50m medley relay	1:55.05		Susanne Hirvonen (29.94); Marlene Niemi (32.85); Mimosa Jallow (25.66); Jenni Moisio (26.60)	Kampuksen Plaani	6 May 2018	Tampere Open Championships	Tampere, Finland	
4×100m medley relay	4:01.49		Mimosa Jallow (1:00.42); Jenna Laukkanen (1:06.42); Emilia Pikkarainen (59.56); Hanna-Maria Seppälä (55.09)	Finland	22 May 2016	European Championships	London, Great Britain	

Legend: # – Record awaiting ratification by Finnish Swimming Association; WR – World record; ER – European record; NR – Nordic record; e – equalled existing record;
Records not set in finals: h – heat; sf – semifinal; r – relay 1st leg; rh – relay heat 1st leg; b – B final; † – en route to final mark; so – swim-off; tt – time trial

=== Mixed relay ===
Event	Time		Name	Club	Date	Meet	Location	Ref
4×50m freestyle relay	1:35.47		Fanny Teijonsalo; Hanna-Maria Seppälä; Tatu Waltari; Ari-Pekka Liukkonen	Cetus Espoo	3 July 2015	-	Helsinki, Finland	
4×100m freestyle relay	3:38.11	h, #	Alex Nurminen (51.19); Aron Zautasvili (51.14); Olivia Riekki (57.67); Riialiina Kiljala (58.11)	Finland	3 July 2024	European Junior Championships	Vilnius, Lithuania	
4×50m medley relay	1:45.70		Miikka Ruohoniemi; Inka Vahtola; Mihail Khanoukaev; Miikka Ruohoniemi	Cetus Espoo	27 June 2025	-	Helsinki, Finland	
4×100m medley relay	3:53.94	h	Mimosa Jallow (1:01.08); Sami Aaltomaa (1:02.18); Tanja Kylliäinen (1:01.23); Ari-Pekka Liukkonen (49.45)	Finland	17 May 2016	European Championships	London, Great Britain	

Legend: # – Record awaiting ratification by Finnish Swimming Association; WR – World record; ER – European record; e – equalled existing record;
Records not set in finals: h – heat; so – swim-off

== Short course (25 m) ==
=== Men ===
Event	Time		Name	Club	Date	Meet	Location	Ref
50m freestyle	21.20		Ari-Pekka Liukkonen	Cetus Espoo	17 November 2018	Finnish Championships	Vaasa, Finland	
100m freestyle	47.13	h	Tomas Koski	Finland	11 December 2024	World Championships	Budapest, Hungary	
200m freestyle	1:41.91		Tomas Koski	Heinolan Isku	21 December 2025	Finnish Championships	Jyväskylä, Finland	
400m freestyle	3:40.15		Tomas Koski	Heinolan Isku	19 December 2025	Finnish Championships	Jyväskylä, Finland	
800m freestyle	7:41.65		Antti Kasvio	-	1 February 1995	-	Espoo, Finland	
1500m freestyle	14:46.80		Antti Kasvio	-	20 January 1994	Finnish Championships	Kuopio, Finland	
50m backstroke	23.76	rh	Ajjuub Ezzat	Finland	7 December 2025	European Championships	Lublin, Poland	
100m backstroke	50.98		Ronny Brännkärr	TaTu Tampere	31 October 2026	Finnish Grand Prix	Jyväskylä, Finland	
200m backstroke	1:53.34		Jani Sievinen	-	19 January 1996	-	Lappeenranta, Finland	
50m breaststroke	26.24	h, so	Olli Kokko	Finland	17 December 2022	World Championships	Melbourne, Australia	
100m breaststroke	58.04	sf	Olli Kokko	Finland	3 November 2021	European Championships	Kazan, Russia	
200m breaststroke	2:04.63		Matti Mattsson	Porin Uimaseura	14 December 2019	Finnish Championships	Tampere, Finland	
50m butterfly	22.65	NR	Riku Pöytäkivi	HSS	28 September 2019	Speedo Cup	Espoo, Finland	
100m butterfly	50.88		Riku Pöytäkivi	Helsingfors Simsällskap	14 December 2019	Finnish Championships	Tampere, Finland	
200m butterfly	1:54.77		Eetu Autio	Turun Urheiluliitto - Uinti	31 October 2026	Finnish Grand Prix	Jyväskylä, Finland	
100m individual medley	52.28	h, so	Ronny Brännkärr	Finland	15 December 2022	World Championships	Melbourne, Australia	
200m individual medley	1:53.98		Ronny Brännkärr	Finland	6 December 2025	European Championships	Lublin, Poland	
400m individual medley	4:06.03		Jani Sievinen	-	20 January 1996	-	Lappeenranta, Finland	
4×50m freestyle relay	1:25.39		Andrei Tuomola (21.85); Ari-Pekka Liukkonen (20.70); Tatu Waltari (21.62); Anton Herrala (21.22)	Finland	2 December 2015	European Championships	Netanya, Israel	
4×100m freestyle relay	3:13.06	h	Ari-Pekka Liukkonen (48.51); Matias Koski (47.63); Andrei Tuomola (48.39); Riku Pöytäkivi (48.53)	Finland	6 December 2016	World Championships	Windsor, Canada	
4×200m freestyle relay	7:10.06		Luukas Vaino (1:44.85); Mihail Khanoukaev (1:47.76); Aku Kaila (1:48.98); Roope Paatos (1:48.47)	Cetus Espoo	16 December 2022	Finnish Championships	Vaasa, Finland	
4×50m medley relay	1:34.23	h	Niko Mäkelä (24.04); Andrei Tuomola (26.61); Riku Pöytäkivi (22.51); Ari-Pekka Liukkonen (21.07)	Finland	8 December 2019	European Championships	Glasgow, Great Britain	
4×100m medley relay	3:32.52		Aku Kaila (54.72); Miikka Ruohoniemi (58.06); Tuomas Kiviluoma (52.47); Ari-Pekka Liukkonen (47.28)	Cetus	18 December 2021	Lyhyen radan mestaruuskilpailut	Espoo, Finland	

Legend: # – Record awaiting ratification by Finnish Swimming Association; WR – World record; ER – European record; NR – Nordic record; e – equalled existing record;
Records not set in finals: h – heat; sf – semifinal; r – relay 1st leg; rh – relay heat 1st leg; b – B final; † – en route to final mark; so – swim-off; tt – time trial

=== Women ===
Event	Time		Name	Club	Date	Meet	Location	Ref
50m freestyle	24.13		Fanny Teijonsalo	Energy Standard	18 September 2021	International Swimming League	Naples, Italy	
100m freestyle	52.28	sf	Hanna-Maria Seppälä	Finland	11 December 2008	European Championships	Rijeka, Croatia	
200m freestyle	1:54.50		Hanna-Maria Seppälä	Cetus	19 September 2009	TYR Cup	Espoo, Finland	
400m freestyle	4:07.32		Ada Hakkarainen	Helsingfors Simsällskap	1 November 2026	Finnish Grand Prix	Jyväskylä, Finland	
800m freestyle	8:31.22		Ada Hakkarainen	Finland	6 December 2023	European Championships	Otopeni, Romania	
1500m freestyle	16:12.34		Ada Hakkarainen	Hss	27 October 2023	North Sea Meet	Stavanger, Norway	
50m backstroke	26.33		Mimosa Jallow	Finland	5 November 2021	European Championships	Kazan, Russia	
100m backstroke	56.81		Mimosa Jallow	Finland	6 November 2021	European Championships	Kazan, Russia	
200m backstroke	2:07.10		Anu Koivisto	Finland	16 December 2001	European Championships	Antwerp, Belgium	
50m breaststroke	29.33	NR	Ida Hulkko	Iron	5 November 2020	International Swimming League	Budapest, Hungary	
100m breaststroke	1:04.25		Jenna Laukkanen	Finland	16 December 2017	European Championships	Copenhagen, Denmark	
200m breaststroke	2:20.75		Jenna Laukkanen	Vuokatti	19 November 2015	Finnish Championships	Espoo, Finland	
50m butterfly	25.45	sf	Laura Lahtinen	Finland	2 December 2025	European Championships	Lublin, Poland	
100m butterfly	55.39	h	Laura Lahtinen	Finland	4 December 2025	European Championships	Lublin, Poland	
200m butterfly	2:03.13		Laura Lahtinen	Finland	18 October 2024	World Cup	Shanghai, China	
100m individual medley	58.42		Jenna Laukkanen	Iron	6 November 2020	International Swimming League	Budapest, Hungary	
200m individual medley	2:09.48		Laura Lahtinen	Hss	27 October 2023	North Sea Meet	Stavanger, Norway	
400m individual medley	4:35.91	h	Tanja Kylliäinen	Finland	3 December 2014	World Championships	Doha, Qatar	
4×50m freestyle relay	1:38.13		Emilia Pikkarainen (25.09); Lotta Nevalainen (24.29); Laura Kurki (24.21); Hanna-Maria Seppälä (24.54)	Finland	22 November 2012	European Championships	Chartres, France	
4×100m freestyle relay	3:40.14		Fanny Teijonsalo (54.38); Peppi Siirtola (55.86); Inka Vahtola (55.22); Anna Kotonen (54.68)	Cetus Espoo	17 December 2022	Finnish Championships	Vaasa, Finland	
4×200m freestyle relay	8:07.34		Kaisla Kollanus (2:00.90); Vilma Ruotsalainen (2:03.73); Tanja Kylliäinen (2:01.22); Vilma Oura (2:01.49)	Helsingfors Simsällskap	19 November 2017	Suomen mestaruusuinnit	Oulu, Finland	
4×50m medley relay	1:46.22		Mimosa Jallow (26.72); Veera Kivirinta (29.45); Jenna Laukkanen (25.55); Marlene Niemi (24.50)	Finland	17 December 2017	European Championships	Copenhagen, Denmark	
4×100m medley relay	3:54.81		Mimosa Jallow (58.64); Jenna Laukkanen (1:04.78); Emilia Pikkarainen (58.47); Hanna-Maria Seppälä (52.92)	Finland	7 December 2014	World Championships	Doha, Qatar	

Legend: # – Record awaiting ratification by Finnish Swimming Association; WR – World record; ER – European record; NR – Nordic record; e – equalled existing record;
Records not set in finals: h – heat; sf – semifinal; r – relay 1st leg; rh – relay heat 1st leg; b – B final; † – en route to final mark; so – swim-off; tt – time trial

=== Mixed relay ===
Event	Time	Name	Club	Date	Meet	Location	Ref
4×50m freestyle relay	1:31.23	Andrei Tuomola (22.26); Ari-Pekka Liukkonen (20.84); Jenna Laukkanen (24.06); Mimosa Jallow (24.07)	Finland	12 December 2018	World Championships	Hangzhou, China	
4×50m medley relay	1:38.71	Mimosa Jallow (26.87); Jenna Laukkanen (29.41); Riku Pöytäkivi (22.32); Ari-Pekka Liukkonen (20.11)	Finland	6 August 2017	World Cup	Berlin, Germany	

Legend: # – Record awaiting ratification by Finnish Swimming Association; WR – World record; ER – European record; NR – Nordic record; e – equalled existing record;
Records not set in finals: h – heat; so – swim-off

== Gallery ==
Some of the current Finnish record holders:

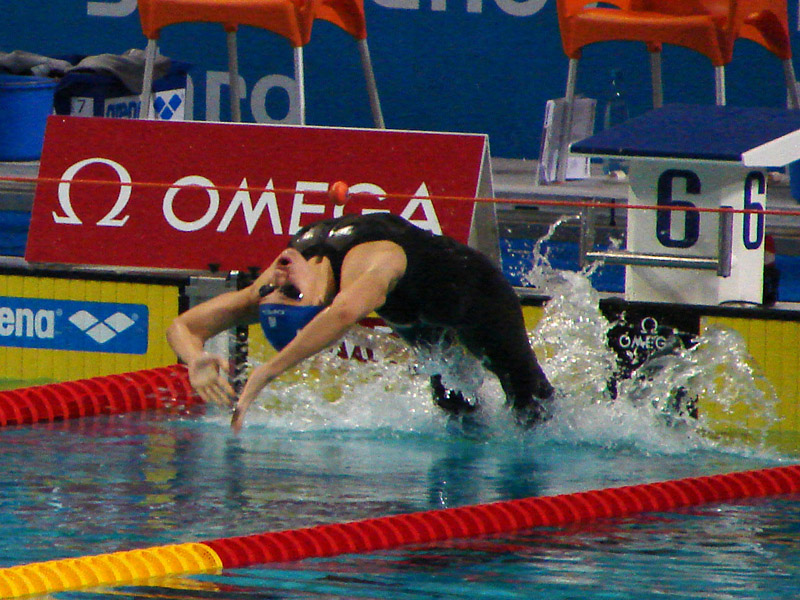
Hanna-Maria Seppälä

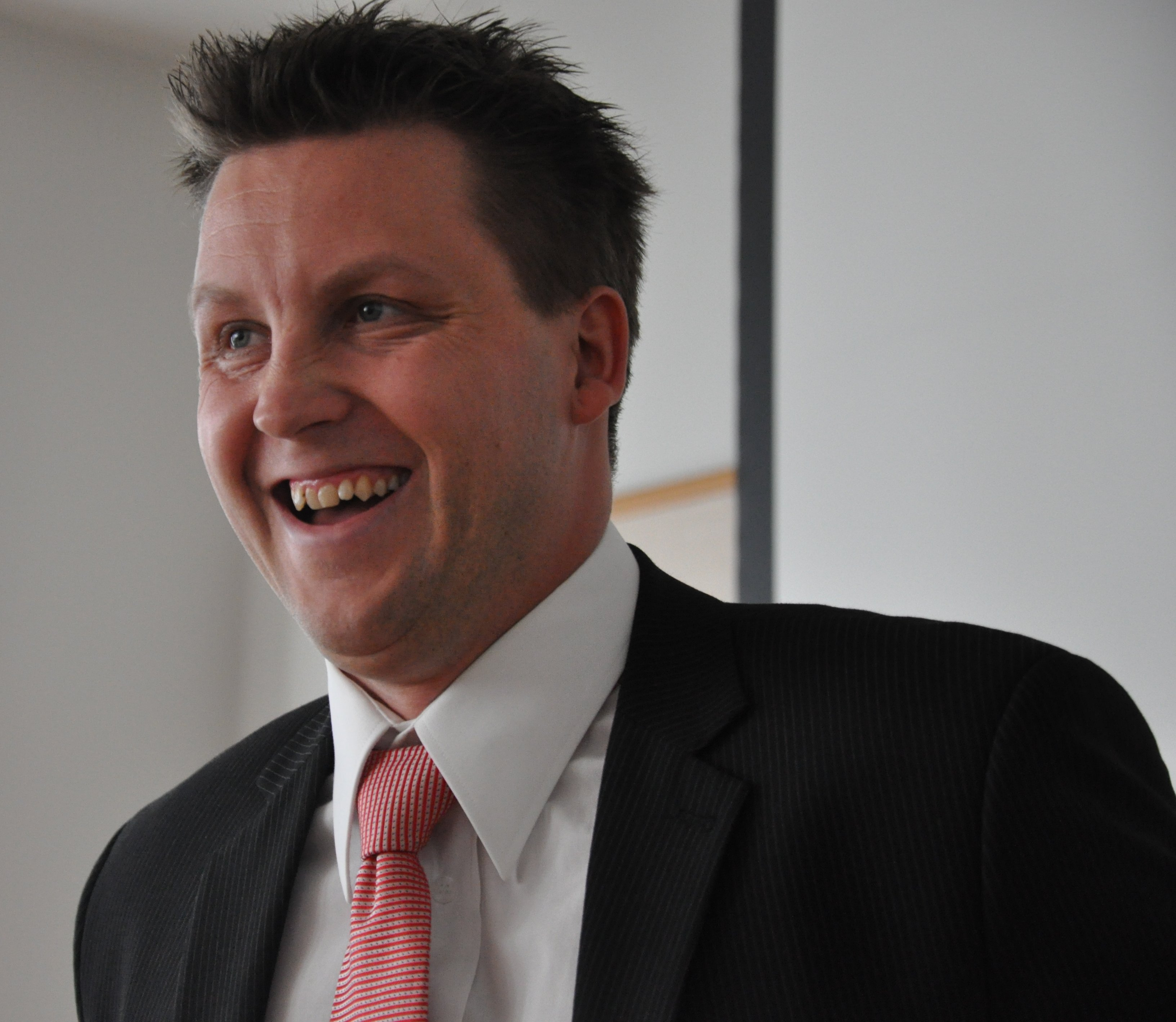
Jani Sievinen
