= Petri Hulkko =

Finnish general

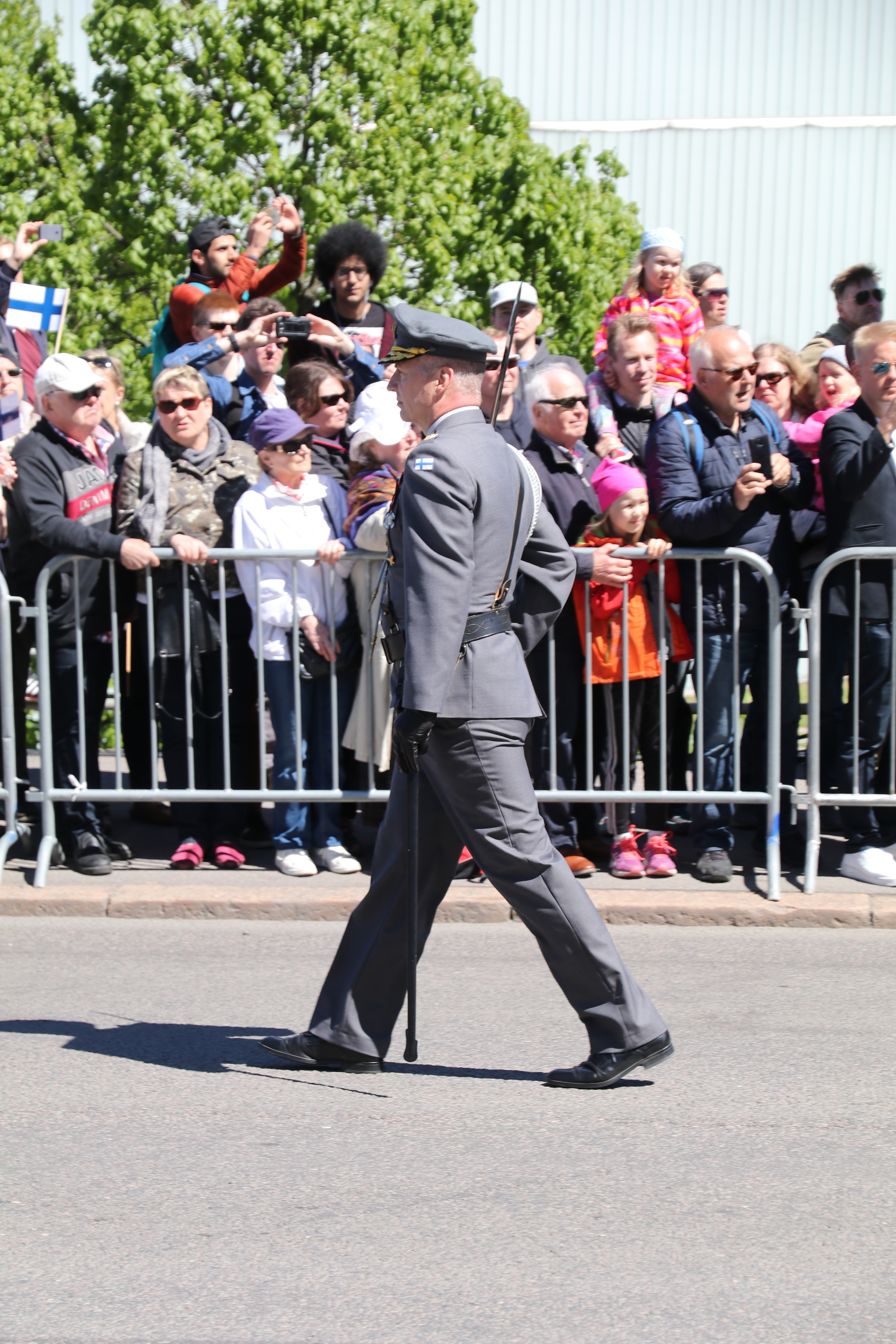
- Petri Hulkko as a major general in 2017
- Born: Petri Jussi Mikael Hulkko; 26 September 1961 (age 65); Juuka, Finland
- Children: Ida Hulkko
- Military career
- Allegiance: Finland
- Branch: Finnish Army
- Service years: 1984–2021
- Rank: Lieutenant general
- Commands: Utti Jaeger Regiment 2004–2008; Finnish Army 2017–present
- Awards: Commander of the White Rose of Finland; Knight, First Class, of the Order of the Lion of Finland; Medal for Military Merits (Finland)
- Website: puolustusvoimat.fi/en/about-us/general-officers/petri-hulkko

Petri Jussi Mikael Hulkko (born 26 September 1961) is a Finnish three-star general. He has served as the commander of the Finnish Army since August 2017 to January 2021. He is now retired.

Hulkko graduated from the Cadet School in 1984. He has since served as the commander of the Utti Jaeger Regiment from 2004 to 2008, as a military advisor to the minister of defence from 2008 to 2011, as chief of operations of the army from 2012 to 2016 and as chief of staff of the army in 2017.

Hulkko is the cousin of Finnish rock musician Andy McCoy. He is the father of Finnish national team swimmer Ida Hulkko.
