= Flag of Benelux =

Benelux
- Flag of Benelux
- Use: Other
- Proportion: 2:3
- Design: A horizontal triband of red, white, and blue with a yellow lion rampant facing left covering a black rectangle in the middle band.

The flag of Benelux is an unofficial flag commissioned by the Committee for Belgian–Dutch–Luxembourgish Cooperation in 1951. It is an amalgam of the flags of the member states: Belgium, the Netherlands, and Luxembourg. The flag is not authorised to represent the Economic Union of Benelux.

The red stripe is from the flag of Luxembourg, the blue stripe is from the flag of the Netherlands, and the black stripe and yellow lion rampant are taken from the coat of arms of Belgium. The lion also historically represents the Low Countries area as a whole, since each constituent nation possesses a coat of arms featuring a lion rampant facing left (Leo Belgicus), which during the 17th century already symbolised the Low Lands as a whole or in part.
