= Tatiana Belonogoff =

Russian swimmer

Personal information
- Nationality: Russian
- Born: 16 July 2001 (age 24)

Sport
- Sport: Swimming

Tatiana Belonogoff (born 16 July 2001) is a Russian swimmer. She competed in the women's 100 metre breaststroke event at the 2020 European Aquatics Championships, in Budapest, Hungary.
