= Petra Halmai =

Hungarian swimmer (born 1997)

Personal information
- Nationality: Hungarian
- Born: 29 May 1997 (age 29) Dombóvár, Hungary

Sport
- Sport: Swimming
- College team: Florida Gulf Coast University

Petra Halmai (born 29 May 1997) is a Hungarian swimmer. She competed in the women's 100 metre breaststroke event at the 2020 European Aquatics Championships, in Budapest, Hungary. She also represented Hungary at the 2020 Summer Olympics in Tokyo, Japan.

== Personal life ==
Halmai is in a relationship with Great Britain men's national basketball team player Amin Adamu.
