= Vexillological symbol =

Symbols used to describe flags

Vexillological symbols are used by vexillologists to indicate certain characteristics of flags, such as where they are used, who uses them, and what they look like. The symbols were created by vexillologist Whitney Smith and then adopted by the International Federation of Vexillological Associations (FIAV) in the early 1970s. Vexillologist Željko Heimer added the symbols for normal and historical in the early 1990s.

== Status and design symbols ==
Vexillological symbols describe information on a flag's recognition status and design.

List of symbols
Symbol	Meaning
Small vexillological symbol or pictogram in black and white showing the different uses of the flag	Normal or de jure version of flag, or obverse side
Small vexillological symbol or pictogram in black and white showing the different uses of the flag	Design was proposed in the past, but never officially adopted
Small vexillological symbol or pictogram in black and white showing the different uses of the flag	Design is a reconstruction, based on past observation
Small vexillological symbol or pictogram in black and white showing the different uses of the flag	Reverse side of flag
Small vexillological symbol or pictogram in black and white showing the different uses of the flag	An acceptable variant of the standard flag
Small vexillological symbol or pictogram in black and white showing the different uses of the flag	One of several alternative versions of the flag that can be displayed
Small vexillological symbol or pictogram in black and white showing the different uses of the flag	De facto flag, widely accepted and used
Small vexillological symbol or pictogram in black and white showing the different uses of the flag	Flag has different designs on its obverse side and its reverse side
Small vexillological symbol or pictogram in black and white showing the different uses of the flag	Obverse side meant to be hoisted with pole to the observer's right
Design officially authorized to represent nation by government of that nation	Design officially authorized to represent nation by government of that nation (not necessary to use when the de jure symbol is used)
Small vexillological symbol or pictogram in black and white showing the different uses of the flag	Design used in the past, but now abandoned
Reverse side is mirror image of obverse side	Reverse side is mirror image of obverse side
Reverse side is congruent with obverse side	Reverse side is congruent to the obverse side
Information on reverse side is not available	Information on reverse side is not available
Flag can be hung vertically by hoisting on a normal pole, then turning the pole 90°	Flag can be hung vertically by hoisting on a normal pole, then turning the pole 90°
Flag can be hung vertically by rotating the design first	Flag can be hung vertically by rotating the design first
Vertical hoist method of flag is unknown	Vertical hoist method of flag is unknown
Design has no element that can be rotated	Design has no element which can be rotated
Flag can be hoisted vertically only	Flag can only be hoisted vertically
Small vexillological symbol or pictogram in black and white showing the different uses of the flag	Flag is not authorized to represent the group or country

Examples
Flag of Paraguay
The normal and two-sided symbols indicate this is the obverse side of an authorized flag, and that the reverse side is different.

Flag of Paraguay
The reverse, official, and two-sided symbols indicate this is the reverse side of an authorized flag, and that the obverse side is different.

Flag of France
The normal symbol indicates this is the official flag of the nation.

Flag of France
The normal and variant symbols indicate this flag is an acceptable variant of the national flag.

Flag of Antarctica
The de facto symbol indicates the flag is widely accepted and used, but not codified by law.

Royal Standard of Lesotho (1966–1987)
The historical symbol indicates that the design was used in the past but is no longer used.

Incorrect Variant of Royal Standard of Lesotho (1966–1987)
The reconstructed symbol indicates that this flag was drawn based purely on written sources.

Flag of Eswatini
The mirror symbol indicates that the reverse side of the flag is a mirrored version of the obverse side.

Flag of Eswatini with Black Tassels
The alternate symbol indicates that this is one of several other acceptable alternative variants of the flag. The Eswatini flag can have lighter colors and blue tassels as well.

Flag of Benelux
The no-flag symbol indicates that this flag cannot be officially used to represent the group or country.

Flag of Saudi Arabia
The sinister and equal symbols indicate that the national flag's hoist is on its right side and that its reverse and obverse sides are identical. The vertical inapplicable symbol indicates that the flag cannot have its elements rotated.

Hanging Flag of Saudi Arabia
The vertical exclusive symbol indicates that this version of the national flag can only be displayed vertically.

== Usage symbols ==
The usage symbols are based on a grid of two rows representing use on land and use on water, and three columns representing private use, public use, and military use. Each circle in the grid indicates the flag has one or more of the following six basic usages:

	Private	Public	Military
Land	Civil flag Flown by private citizens on land	State flag Flown by the government on land	War flag Flown by the military on land
Water	Civil ensign Flown by private vessels	State ensign Flown by government vessels	Naval ensign Flown by military vessels

A single design may be associated with no usages or multiple usages. Heimer suggested an additional row for air ensigns, but it has not been adopted by FIAV. The air ensign row refers to flags displayed on aircraft, including when on the ground, and air installations. The air ensign row is placed above the remaining two rows.

List of symbols
Symbol	Meaning	Symbol	Meaning
Small vexillological symbol or pictogram in black and white showing the different uses of the flag	Civil flag	Small vexillological symbol or pictogram in black and white showing the different uses of the flag	National flag
Small vexillological symbol or pictogram in black and white showing the different uses of the flag	State flag	Small vexillological symbol or pictogram in black and white showing the different uses of the flag	National ensign
Small vexillological symbol or pictogram in black and white showing the different uses of the flag	War flag	Small vexillological symbol or pictogram in black and white showing the different uses of the flag	State and war flag, war ensign
Small vexillological symbol or pictogram in black and white showing the different uses of the flag	Civil ensign	Small vexillological symbol or pictogram in black and white showing the different uses of the flag	State flag, civil and war ensign
Small vexillological symbol or pictogram in black and white showing the different uses of the flag	State ensign	Small vexillological symbol or pictogram in black and white showing the different uses of the flag	Civil and state flags and ensigns
Small vexillological symbol or pictogram in black and white showing the different uses of the flag	War ensign	Small vexillological symbol or pictogram in black and white showing the different uses of the flag	State and war flags and ensigns
Small vexillological symbol or pictogram in black and white showing the different uses of the flag	Civil and state flag	Small vexillological symbol or pictogram in black and white showing the different uses of the flag	National flag, civil ensign
Small vexillological symbol or pictogram in black and white showing the different uses of the flag	State and war flag	Small vexillological symbol or pictogram in black and white showing the different uses of the flag	National flag, state ensign
Small vexillological symbol or pictogram in black and white showing the different uses of the flag	Civil and state ensign	Small vexillological symbol or pictogram in black and white showing the different uses of the flag	National flag, civil and state ensign
Small vexillological symbol or pictogram in black and white showing the different uses of the flag	State and war ensign	Small vexillological symbol or pictogram in black and white showing the different uses of the flag	National flag, state and war ensign
Small vexillological symbol or pictogram in black and white showing the different uses of the flag	Civil flag and ensign	Small vexillological symbol or pictogram in black and white showing the different uses of the flag	State and war flag, national ensign
Small vexillological symbol or pictogram in black and white showing the different uses of the flag	State flag and ensign	Small vexillological symbol or pictogram in black and white showing the different uses of the flag	Civil and state flag, national ensign
Small vexillological symbol or pictogram in black and white showing the different uses of the flag	War flag and ensign	Small vexillological symbol or pictogram in black and white showing the different uses of the flag	National flag and ensign
Small vexillological symbol or pictogram in black and white showing the different uses of the flag	Civil and war ensign	Small vexillological symbol or pictogram in black and white showing the different uses of the flag	Civil flag, war ensign
Small vexillological symbol or pictogram in black and white showing the different uses of the flag	Civil flag, state ensign	Small vexillological symbol or pictogram in black and white showing the different uses of the flag	Civil flag, state and war ensign
Small vexillological symbol or pictogram in black and white showing the different uses of the flag	Civil flag, civil and war ensign	Small vexillological symbol or pictogram in black and white showing the different uses of the flag	Civil flag, civil and state ensign
Small vexillological symbol or pictogram in black and white showing the different uses of the flag	Civil flag, national ensign	Small vexillological symbol or pictogram in black and white showing the different uses of the flag	Civil and war flag
Small vexillological symbol or pictogram in black and white showing the different uses of the flag	Civil and war flag, war ensign	Small vexillological symbol or pictogram in black and white showing the different uses of the flag	Civil and war flag, state ensign
Small vexillological symbol or pictogram in black and white showing the different uses of the flag	Civil and war flag, state and war ensign	Small vexillological symbol or pictogram in black and white showing the different uses of the flag	Civil and war flag, civil ensign
Small vexillological symbol or pictogram in black and white showing the different uses of the flag	Civil and war flags and ensigns	Small vexillological symbol or pictogram in black and white showing the different uses of the flag	Civil and war flag, civil and state ensign
Small vexillological symbol or pictogram in black and white showing the different uses of the flag	Civil and war flag, national ensign	Small vexillological symbol or pictogram in black and white showing the different uses of the flag	Civil and state flag, war ensign
Small vexillological symbol or pictogram in black and white showing the different uses of the flag	Civil and state flag, state ensign	Small vexillological symbol or pictogram in black and white showing the different uses of the flag	Civil and state flag, state and war ensign
Small vexillological symbol or pictogram in black and white showing the different uses of the flag	Civil and state flag, civil ensign	Small vexillological symbol or pictogram in black and white showing the different uses of the flag	Civil and state flag, civil and war ensign
Small vexillological symbol or pictogram in black and white showing the different uses of the flag	State flag, war ensign	Small vexillological symbol or pictogram in black and white showing the different uses of the flag	State flag, state and war ensign
Small vexillological symbol or pictogram in black and white showing the different uses of the flag	State flag, civil ensign	Small vexillological symbol or pictogram in black and white showing the different uses of the flag	State flag, state and civil ensign
Small vexillological symbol or pictogram in black and white showing the different uses of the flag	State flag, national ensign	Small vexillological symbol or pictogram in black and white showing the different uses of the flag	State flag and ensign, war flag
Small vexillological symbol or pictogram in black and white showing the different uses of the flag	State and war flag, civil ensign	Small vexillological symbol or pictogram in black and white showing the different uses of the flag	State and war flag, civil and war ensign
Small vexillological symbol or pictogram in black and white showing the different uses of the flag	State and war flag, civil and state ensign	Small vexillological symbol or pictogram in black and white showing the different uses of the flag	War flag, state ensign
Small vexillological symbol or pictogram in black and white showing the different uses of the flag	War flag, state and war ensign	Small vexillological symbol or pictogram in black and white showing the different uses of the flag	War flag, civil ensign
Small vexillological symbol or pictogram in black and white showing the different uses of the flag	War flag, civil and war ensign	Small vexillological symbol or pictogram in black and white showing the different uses of the flag	War flag, civil and state ensign
Small vexillological symbol or pictogram in black and white showing the different uses of the flag	War flag, national ensign	Small vexillological symbol or pictogram in black and white showing the different uses of the flag	National flag, war ensign
Small vexillological symbol or pictogram in black and white showing the different uses of the flag	National flag, civil and war ensign	Small vexillological symbol or pictogram in black and white showing the different uses of the flag	Other

Examples
The civil flag and ensign of Serbia is used by Serbian citizens on land and sea

The state flag and ensign is used by the Serbian government on land and sea

The war flag is used by the Serbian Army

The naval ensign is used by the Serbian River Flotilla

== See also ==
- Glossary of vexillology
