= Andrei Tuomola =

Finnish swimmer

Personal information
- Nationality: Finnish
- Born: 4 May 1989 (age 37)

Sport
- Sport: Swimming

Andrei Tuomola (born 4 May 1989) is a Finnish swimmer. He competed in the men's 50 metre breaststroke event at the 2018 FINA World Swimming Championships (25 m), in Hangzhou, China.
