= Royal Belgian Swimming Federation =

Belgian Olympic Swimming Team

- Sport: Swimming
- Abbreviation: (KBZB/FRBN)
- Affiliation: FINA
- Regional affiliation: LEN
- Location: Brussels
- Chairman: Daniel Motton
- Secretary: Wouter Georges

Official website
- www.belswim.be
- (Belgium)

The Royal Belgian Swimming Federation (Dutch: Koninklijke Belgische Zwembond; French: Fédération Royale Belge de Natation) is the umbrella swimming association in Belgium and is responsible for all types of swimming: swimming in lanes, water polo, synchronised swimming, diving and open water swimming. The federation has its registered office in Brussels. Michel Louwagie is the current president since 1998. The RBSF is affiliated with the Belgian Olympic Committee, the Ligue Européenne de Natation and the Federation Internationale de Natation. The Board of Directors and the General Assembly of the RBSF consist of representatives of the Flemish and Francophone swimming federations (the Vlaamse Zwemfederatie and the Fédération Francophone Belge de Natation, respectively). The Belgian Swimming Federation is formally authorized to represent the Belgian swimming world and to deliver athletes and teams to international tournaments. The informal power and sport policy lie in fact with the regional swimming federations, which have the financial resources.

== See also ==
- Swimming at the Summer Olympics § Medal table
- FINA World Aquatics Championships#All-time medal since 1973
