= Ida Hulkko =

Finnish swimmer (born 1998)

Personal information
- Born: 12 December 1998 (age 27) Mikkeli, Finland

Sport
- Sport: Swimming
- College team: Florida State
Medal record
Women's swimming
Representing Finland
European Championships (LC)
Silver medal – second place	2020 Budapest	50 m breaststroke

Ida Hulkko (born 12 December 1998) is a Finnish swimmer specializing in the breaststroke. She competed at the 2017 European Short Course Swimming Championships, as well as the 2018 European Aquatics Championships, placing 5th in the 50m breaststroke finals. She swam at the 2018 FINA Short Course Championships, reaching the final in the 50m breaststroke.

She also swam for the Florida State Seminoles of NCAA Division I. Hulkko announced she would redshirt the 2019-20 collegiate season in order to train for Tokyo. In May 2020, Hulkko announced she would not be returning to swim for the Seminoles.

In 2021, Hulkko won silver in the 50 metre breaststroke at the 2020 European Aquatics Championships, setting a national record in the process. She qualified to represent Finland at the 2020 Summer Olympics in Tokyo. At the games, Hulkko progressed to the semi-finals in the Women's 100 metre breaststroke after setting a national record in her heat. In 2024, Hulkko competed in the Summer Olympics in Paris, once again competing in the 100 metre breastroke. She finished 26th in the heats and did not advance.

Hulkko is the daughter of Finnish Army general Petri Hulkko. She got engaged to Turkish swimmer Metin Aydın in 2024.
