= Sarah Vasey =

British swimmer (born 1996)

Personal information
- Full name: Sarah Marie Vasey
- Nationality: British
- Born: 29 August 1996 (age 29) Derby, England
- Height: 5 ft 9 in (175 cm)
- Weight: 9 st 8 lb (61 kg)

Sport
- Sport: Swimming
- Strokes: Breaststroke
Medal record
Representing Great Britain
European Championships (LC)
Gold medal – first place	2020 Budapest	4×100 m medley
Representing England
Commonwealth Games
Gold medal – first place	2018 Gold Coast	50 m breastroke

Sarah Marie Vasey (born 29 August 1996) is a former British swimmer. She competed in the women's 50 metre and 100 metre breaststroke events at the 2017 World Aquatics Championships. Vasey qualified for the 50 metre breaststroke final at the 2018 Commonwealth Games, Gold Coast, Australia and went on to win gold.

Vasey was included in April 2021 as a member of the "high quality" British team to go to the postponed 2020 Olympics in Tokyo. She joined an "exceptionally high quality" swimming team which included Jacob Whittle, Abbie Wood and Molly Renshaw who are all from Derbyshire and also at their first Olympics.

On 23 September 2022, Vasey announced her retirement from the sport.
