= Ema Rajić =

Croatian swimmer (born 2000)

Personal information
- Nationality: Croatian
- Born: 24 February 2000 (age 26)

Sport
- Sport: Swimming
- College team: University of California, Berkeley
Medal record
Women's swimming
Representing the California Golden Bears
NCAA Championships
| Gold medal – first place | 2019 Austin | 4×100 y medley |
| Silver medal – second place | 2019 Austin | 4×50 y medley |

Ema Rajić (born 24 February 2000) is a Croatian swimmer. She graduated from University Laboratory High School in 2018. She competed in the women's 50 metre breaststroke at the 2019 World Aquatics Championships, but she did not advance to the semi-finals.

In 2019, she was part of the California Golden Bear's NCAA National Champions in the 400 medley relay and Runner-Up National Champions in the 200 yard medley relay held in Austin, Texas. She qualified for and participated in the 100-yard breaststroke NCAA A final, where she placed eighth.

In 2021, she competed in the women's 50 metre freestyle event at the 2020 Summer Olympics held in Tokyo, Japan. She also competed in the women's 100 metre breaststroke event.
