= Rosey Metz =

Dutch swimmer (born 2001)

Personal information
- Nationality: Dutch
- Born: 14 June 2001 (age 25)

Sport
- Sport: Swimming

Rosey Metz (born 14 June 2001) is a Dutch swimmer. She competed in the women's 50 metre breaststroke at the 2019 World Aquatics Championships. She qualified to compete in the semi-finals but she did not qualify to compete in the final.

== Personal bests ==
Short course
Event	Time	Date	Location
50 m breaststroke	29.69	2021-12-04	The Hague, Netherlands
100 m breaststroke	1:06.59	2021-11-14	Rotterdam, Netherlands
200 m breaststroke	2:25.73	2021-12-03	The Hague, Netherlands

Long course
Event	Time	Date	Location
50 m breaststroke	30.63	2021-05-22	Budapest, Hungary
100 m breaststroke	1:08.20	2020-12-05	Rotterdam, Netherlands
200 m breaststroke	2:31.28	2021-03-20	Marseille, France
