= Valentine Dumont =

Belgian swimmer (born 2000)

Personal information
- Nationality: Belgian
- Born: 2 July 2000 (age 25)

Sport
- Sport: Swimming
Medal record
Representing Belgium
European Junior Championships
Silver medal – second place	2017 Netanya	200m freestyle
Silver medal – second place	2017 Netanya	4x200m freestyle relay
Bronze medal – third place	2017 Netanya	200m butterfly
Bronze medal – third place	2017 Netanya	4x100m freestyle relay

Valentine Dumont (born 2 July 2000) is a Belgian swimmer. She competed in the women's 200 metre freestyle at the 2019 World Aquatics Championships. In 2017, she won the silver medal in the girls' 200 metre freestyle at the 2017 European Junior Swimming Championships held in Netanya, Israel.
