= Jasper Aerents =

Belgian swimmer (born 1992)

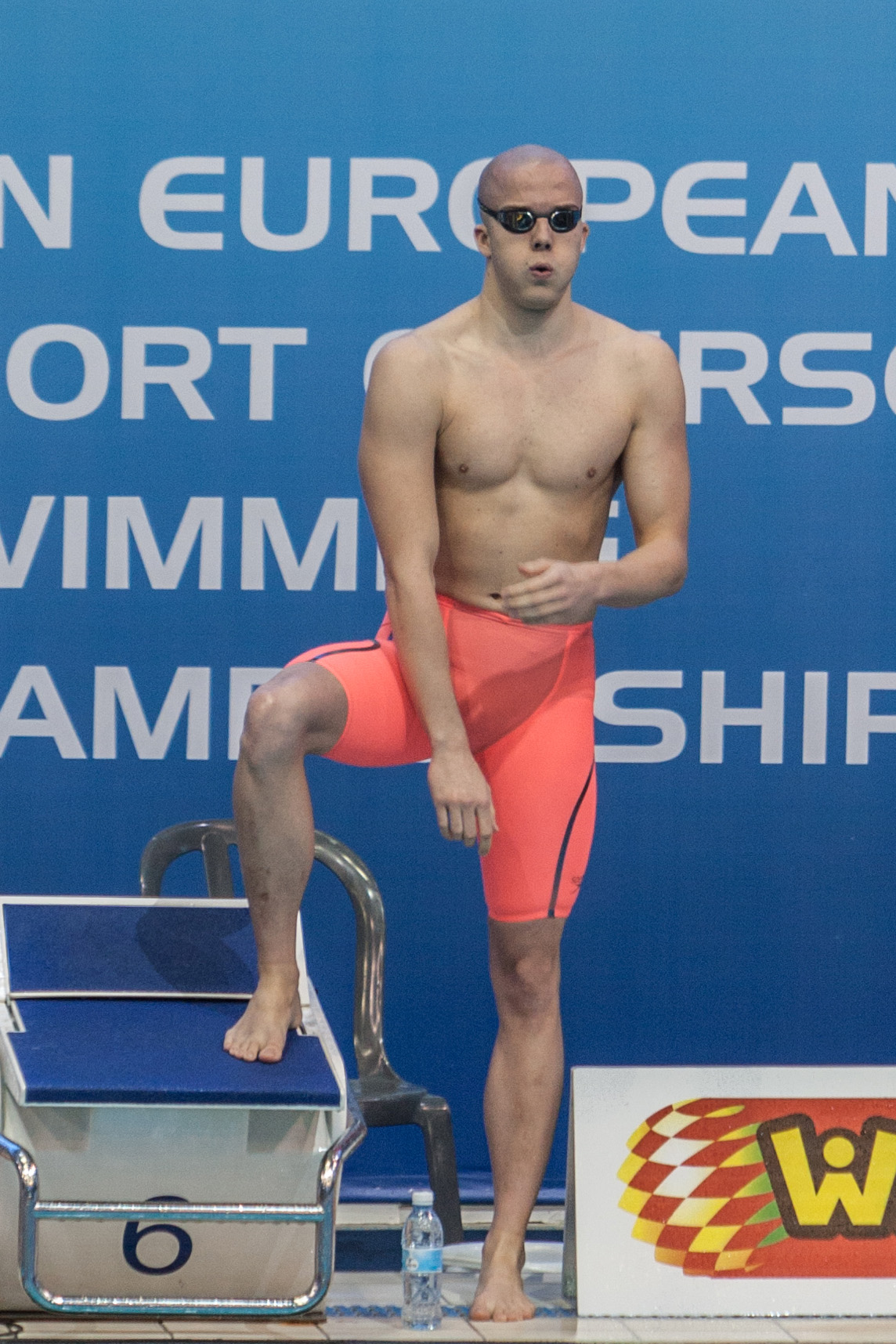
- Aerents at the 2015 European Short Course Championships, Netanya

Personal information
- Nationality: Belgium
- Born: 18 December 1992 (age 33) Ghent, Belgium
- Height: 1.90 m (6 ft 3 in)
- Weight: 84 kg (185 lb)

Sport
- Sport: Swimming
- Strokes: Freestyle
- Club: Koninklijke Brugse Zwemkring
- Coach: Rik Valcke (BEL)
Medal record
European Championships (LC)
Bronze medal – third place	2016 London	4×100 m freestyle
European Championships (SC)
Bronze medal – third place	2011 Szczecin	4×50 m freestyle
Bronze medal – third place	2012 Chartres	4×50 m freestyle
Bronze medal – third place	2013 Herning	4×50 m freestyle
European Junior Championships
Silver medal – second place	2010 Helsinki	50 m freestyle

Jasper Aerents (born 18 December 1992) is a Belgian swimmer, who specialized in sprint freestyle events.

== Career ==
He won two bronze medals, as a member of the Belgian swimming team, in the 4×50 m freestyle relay at the 2011 European Short Course Swimming Championships in Szczecin, Poland, and at the 2012 European Short Course Swimming Championships in Chartres, France. He also captured a silver medal in the 50 m freestyle at the 2010 European Junior Swimming Championships in Helsinki, Finland by a quarter of a second (0.25) behind Ukraine's Andriy Hovorov, in a personal best of 22.79.

Aerents is a member of Regal Swimming Club (Dutch: Koninklijke Brugse Zwemkring) in Belgium, and is coached and trained by Rik Valcke.

Aerents qualified for two swimming events at the 2012 Summer Olympics in London, by clearing a FINA B-standard entry time of 22.42 (50 m freestyle) from the Nancy Long Course Invitational in Nancy, France. He also teamed up with Dieter Dekoninck, Emmanuel Vanluchene, and Pieter Timmers in the 4 × 100 m freestyle relay. Swimming the second leg, Aerents recorded a split of 48.34, but the Belgian team rounded out the finale to last place in 3:14.40. In the 50 m freestyle, Aerents topped the fifth heat by 0.21 of a second ahead of China's Shi Yang in 22.43, just a 0.01-second deficit from his entry time and personal best. Aerents failed to advance into the semifinals, as he placed twenty-second out of 58 swimmers in the preliminaries.
