= Fleur Vermeiren =

Belgian swimmer (born 2002)

Personal information
- Nationality: Belgian
- Born: 21 June 2002 (age 24)

Sport
- Sport: Swimming

Fleur Vermeiren (born 21 June 2002) is a Belgian swimmer. She competed in the women's 50 metre breaststroke at the 2019 World Aquatics Championships. She qualified to compete in the semi-finals but she did not qualify to compete in the final.
