= Flag of Belgium =

Kingdom of Belgium
- Use: National flag
- Proportion: 13:15 (Note: According to the Official Guide to Belgian Protocol. It has a 13:15 aspect ratio, though it is rarely seen in this ratio.)
- Adopted: 23 January 1831; 195 years ago
- Design: A vertical tricolour of black, yellow, and red.
- Use: Civil ensign
- Proportion: 2:3 or similar
- Design: A vertical tricolour of black, yellow, and red.

The national flag of the Kingdom of Belgium is a tricolour consisting of three equal vertical bands displaying the national colours: black, yellow, and red. The colours were taken from the coat of arms of the Duchy of Brabant, and the vertical design may be based on the flag of France. When flown, the black band is nearest the pole (at the hoist side). It has the unusual proportions of 13∶15, and therefore, unlike the flags of Switzerland and the Vatican City, it is not a perfect square.

In 1830, the flag, at that time non-officially, consisted of three horizontal bands, with the colors red, yellow and black. On 23 January 1831, the National Congress enshrined the tricolor in the Constitution, but did not determine the direction and order of the color bands. As a result, the "official" flag was given vertical stripes with the colors black, yellow and red.

== Previous flags ==
After the death of Charlemagne, the present-day territory of Belgium (except the County of Flanders) became part of Lotharingia, which had a flag of two horizontal red stripes separated by a white stripe. The territory then passed into Spanish hands, and after the coronation of Charles V, Holy Roman Emperor, yellow and red, the colours of Spain, were added. From the 16th century to the end of the 18th century, the colours of what is now Belgium were red, white and yellow. Occasionally, the red Cross of Burgundy was placed on the white section of the flag.

During the period of Austrian rule, a number of different flags were tried. Eventually, the Austrian emperor imposed the Austrian flag. The population of Brussels was opposed to this, and, following the example of France, red, yellow and black cockades began to appear, those being the colours of Brabant. The colours thus correspond to the red lion of Hainaut, Limburg and Luxembourg, the yellow lion of Brabant, and the black lion of Flanders and Namur.

== Independence and adoption of current flag ==
Flag of the Brabant Revolution (1789–1790)

Flag of the Belgian Revolution (1830–1831)

On 27 August 1830, the day after the rioting at the La Monnaie theatre and the start of the Belgian Revolution, the flag of France flew from the city hall of Brussels. The insurgents hastily replaced it with a tricolour of red, yellow, and black horizontal stripes (similar to the one used during the Brabant Revolution of 1789–1790 which had established the United States of Belgium) made at a nearby fabric store. As a result, Article 193 of the Constitution of Belgium describes the colours of the Belgian nation as Red, Yellow, and Black, the reverse order shown in the official flag.

On 23 January 1831, the stripes changed from horizontal to vertical, and on 12 October, the flag attained its modern form, with the black placed at the hoist side of the flag.

== Design and specifications ==
Construction sheet of the flag of Belgium.

The official guide to protocol in Belgium states that the national flag measures 2.6 m (8.5 ft) tall for each 3 m (9.8 ft) wide, giving it a ratio of 13:15. Each of the stripes is one-third of the width of the flag. The yellow is in fact yellow and not the darker gold of the flag of Germany, which is a black-red-gold tricolour, striped horizontally.

== Variants ==
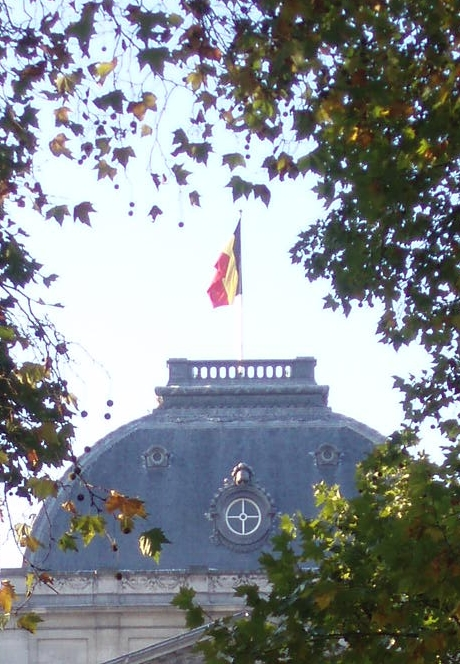
The flag on the Royal Palace of Brussels in the official 13:15 aspect ratio.

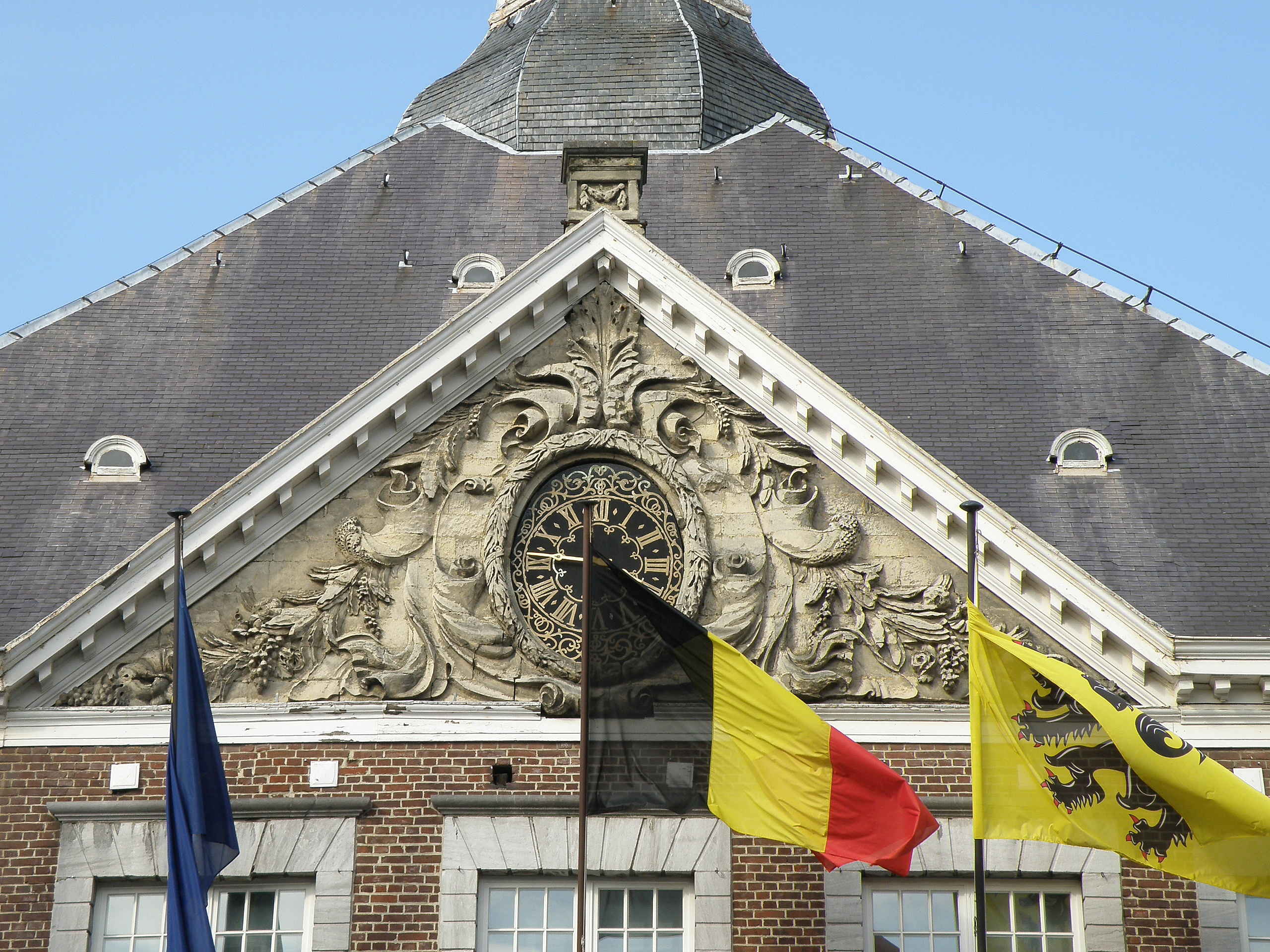
The 2:3 ratio is more commonly displayed on town halls. Pictured: town hall of Hasselt.

=== National flag and civil ensign ===
The national flag has the unusual proportions of 13:15.

The 2:3 flag is the civil ensign, the correct flag for use by civilians at sea.

Flag of Belgium

Civil flag of Belgium

=== Government Ensign of Belgium ===
The Belgian government ensign is used by state-owned vessels and government agencies operating at sea, including customs, police, and coast guard vessels, as well as official transport ships for Belgian authorities and maritime service vessels like those for pilotage, hydrography, and lighthouse maintenance. It distinguishes these ships from civilian vessels (which use the national flag) and navy.

The Belgian government ensign consists of a vertical tricolour of black, yellow, and red defaced by a lion rampant ensigned by a crown, both sable (black), the lion armed and langued gules (red).

Government Ensign of Belgium

=== Naval ensign and jack ===
The naval ensign of Belgium has the three national colours in a saltire, on a white field, with a black crown above crossed cannons at the top and a black anchor at the bottom. It was created in 1950, shortly after the Belgian Navy was re-established, having been a section of the British Royal Navy during World War II, and it is reminiscent of the White Ensign of the Royal Navy.

There is also an official Belgian naval jack, which is the same as the national flag, except in a 1:1 ratio, making it square.

Naval Jack of Belgium

Belgian Naval pennant

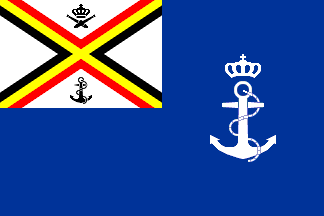
The Belgian Naval Auxiliary Ensign

=== Royal standard and flags on the royal palaces ===
The royal standard of Belgium is the personal standard of the current king, Philippe, and features his monogram, an 'F' (for the Dutch 'Filip'), crossed with a 'P' in the four corners. The designs of royal standards of past monarchs have been similar.

The flags are flown above the palaces when the monarch is in Belgium, not necessarily just in one of the palaces. The flags are not flown if the monarch is on a state visit overseas or on holiday outside of Belgium. There have been exceptions to this rule, but, in general, presence or absence of the flag is a reasonably reliable indicator of whether or not the monarch is in the country.

Flag of Belgium (with crown)

Royal Standard of King Philippe of Belgium

=== Military flags of Belgium ===
The flags of the Belgian Land, Air, and Naval Components represent their different branches in the Belgian military.

The flag of the Belgian Land Component was adopted on 1 September 1982. The flag is white with the Army shield topped by a Royal crown. The Army shield is red with a black embattled wall. The shield is charged with a raised sword hold by two hands, the sinister one being bare and the dexter one covered with a gauntlet. The dexter hand is placed over the sinister one. The sword and the hands are all yellow. The Royal crown is yellow with a red cap, decorated with white pearls and gems. The number, shape, and colour of the pearls and gems vary from flag to flag.

The flag of the Belgian Air Force was adopted on 4 February 1948. The flag of the Belgian Air Component is the badge of the air force and roundel of the Air force on a blue field.

The flag of the Belgian Navy was adopted on 2 March 1950. The ensign reminds the White Ensign of the Royal Navy, from which the Belgian Navy was re-established. The St. Andrew's cross was derived from the Cross of Burgundy, which decorated the ensigns of the Belgian ships during the Burgondian rule. The colours of the cross are the national colours. The crossed cannons highlight the military status of the ensign. The crown is the emblem of the kingdom, The anchors symbolize the ship's crews.

Flag of the Belgian Land Component

Air Force ensign of Belgium

Naval ensign of Belgium

== Protocol ==
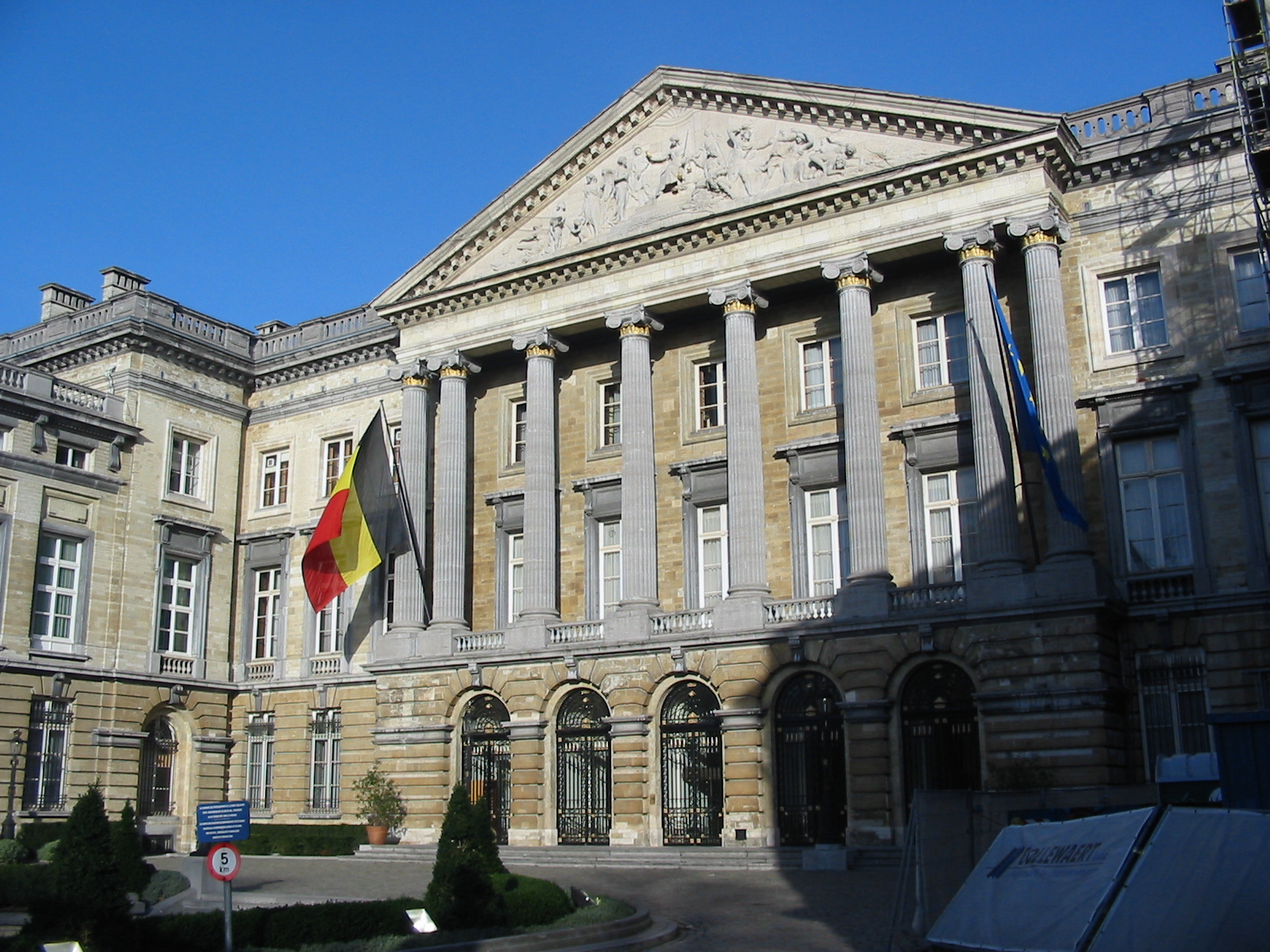
The flag on the Belgian Federal Parliament building

As Belgium is a federal state, the flag of Belgium and the flags of the communities or regions in principle occupy the same rank. Nonetheless, when flags are raised and lowered or carried in a procession, the national flag takes precedence over all the others.

The order of precedence is:

1. The national flag of Belgium
2. The flag of the community or region of Belgium
3. The European Flag
4. The flags of the provinces of Belgium, in alphabetical order in the local language, if more than one is flown
5. The flag of the municipality

If there is a visiting head of state, that country's flag may be set second in precedence, all other flags dropping a rank.

== See also ==
- List of Belgian flags
- Flag of Flanders
- Flag of Wallonia
- Flag of Brussels
- Driekleur trikot
- Coat of arms of Belgium
