= Benin at the 2025 World Aquatics Championships =

- Flag of Benin
- World Aquatics code: BEN
- National federation: Benin Swimming Federation

in Singapore
- Competitors: 3 in 1 sport
- Medals: Gold 0 Silver 0 Bronze 0 Total 0

World Aquatics Championships appearances
- 1973; 1975; 1978; 1982; 1986; 1991; 1994; 1998; 2001; 2003; 2005; 2007; 2009; 2011; 2013; 2015; 2017; 2019; 2022; 2023; 2024; 2025

Benin is competing at the 2025 World Aquatics Championships in Singapore from 11 July to 3 August 2025.

== Competitors ==
The following is the list of competitors in the Championships.

Sport	Men	Women	Total
Swimming	2	1	3
Total	2	1	3

== Swimming ==
Men

Athlete	Event	Heat		Semifinal		Final	
Athlete	Event	Time	Rank	Time	Rank	Time	Rank
Alexis Kpade	100 m backstroke	57.50 NR	53	Did not advance			
Alexis Kpade	200 m backstroke	2:06.23	39	Did not advance			
Jefferson Kpanou	50 m butterfly	25.64	68	Did not advance			
Jefferson Kpanou	100 m butterfly	58.16	68	Did not advance			

Women

Athlete	Event	Heat		Semifinal		Final	
Athlete	Event	Time	Rank	Time	Rank	Time	Rank
Ionnah Eliane Douillet	50 m freestyle	27.38	56	Did not advance			
Ionnah Eliane Douillet	50 m butterfly	29.48	63	Did not advance			
