= Comoros at the 2025 World Aquatics Championships =

- Flag of Comoros
- World Aquatics code: COM
- National federation: Comoros Swimming Federation

in Singapore
- Competitors: 2 in 1 sport
- Medals: Gold 0 Silver 0 Bronze 0 Total 0

World Aquatics Championships appearances
- 2007; 2009; 2011; 2013; 2015; 2017; 2019; 2022; 2023; 2024; 2025

Comoros is competing at the 2025 World Aquatics Championships in Singapore from 11 July to 3 August 2025.

== Competitors ==
The following is the list of competitors in the Championships.

Sport	Men	Women	Total
Swimming	1	1	2
Total	1	1	2

== Swimming ==
Men

Athlete	Event	Heat		Semifinal		Final	
Athlete	Event	Time	Rank	Time	Rank	Time	Rank
Hassane Hadji	100 m freestyle	1:02.55	101	Did not advance			
Hassane Hadji	50 m butterfly	30.22	94	Did not advance			

Women

Athlete	Event	Heat		Semifinal		Final	
Athlete	Event	Time	Rank	Time	Rank	Time	Rank
Maesha Saadi	50 m freestyle	28.66	71	Did not advance			
Maesha Saadi	50 m breaststroke	36.23	48	Did not advance			
