= Suriname at the 2025 World Aquatics Championships =

- Flag of Suriname
- World Aquatics code: SUR
- National federation: Surinaamse Zwem Bond

in Singapore
- Competitors: 2 in 1 sport
- Medals: Gold 0 Silver 0 Bronze 0 Total 0

World Aquatics Championships appearances
- 1973; 1975; 1978; 1982; 1986; 1991; 1994; 1998; 2001; 2003; 2005; 2007; 2009; 2011; 2013; 2015; 2017; 2019; 2022; 2023; 2024; 2025

Suriname competed at the 2025 World Aquatics Championships in Singapore from July 11 to August 3, 2025.

== Competitors ==
The following is the list of competitors in the Championships.

Sport	Men	Women	Total
Swimming	1	1	2
Total	1	1	2

== Swimming ==
Suriname entered 2 swimmers.

Men

Athlete	Event	Heat		Semi-final		Final	
Athlete	Event	Time	Rank	Time	Rank	Time	Rank
Jeno Heyns	50 m freestyle	24.44	77	Did not advance			
Jeno Heyns	50 m butterfly	25.46	62	Did not advance			

Women

Athlete	Event	Heat		Semi-final		Final	
Athlete	Event	Time	Rank	Time	Rank	Time	Rank
Amazya Macrooy	1000 m freestyle	1:07.92	76	Did not advance			
Amazya Macrooy	100 m butterfly	1:14.69	57	Did not advance			
