= Ethiopia at the 2025 World Aquatics Championships =

- Flag of Ethiopia
- World Aquatics code: ETH
- National federation: Ethiopian Swimming Federation

in Singapore
- Competitors: 2 in 1 sport
- Medals: Gold 0 Silver 0 Bronze 0 Total 0

World Aquatics Championships appearances
- 2009; 2011; 2013; 2015; 2017; 2019; 2022; 2023; 2024; 2025

Ethiopia is competing at the 2025 World Aquatics Championships in Singapore from 11 July to 3 August 2025.

== Competitors ==
The following is the list of competitors in the Championships.

Sport	Men	Women	Total
Swimming	1	1	2
Total	1	1	2

== Swimming ==
Men

Athlete	Event	Heat		Semifinal		Final	
Athlete	Event	Time	Rank	Time	Rank	Time	Rank
Temkin Getachew Mohammed	50 m freestyle	28.14	108	Did not advance			
Temkin Getachew Mohammed	50 m breaststroke	39.42	78	Did not advance			

Women

Athlete	Event	Heat		Semifinal		Final	
Athlete	Event	Time	Rank	Time	Rank	Time	Rank
Lina Alemayehu Selo	50 m freestyle	31.58	93	Did not advance			
Lina Alemayehu Selo	50 m butterfly	34.63	78	Did not advance			
