= Suriname at the 2017 World Aquatics Championships =

- Flag of Suriname
- FINA code: SUR
- National federation: Surinaamse Zwem Bond
- Website: www.surinameswimming.com

in Budapest, Hungary
- Competitors: 3 in 1 sport
- Medals: Gold 0 Silver 0 Bronze 0 Total 0

World Aquatics Championships appearances
- 1973; 1975; 1978; 1982; 1986; 1991; 1994; 1998; 2001; 2003; 2005; 2007; 2009; 2011; 2013; 2015; 2017; 2019; 2022; 2023; 2024

Suriname competed at the 2017 World Aquatics Championships in Budapest, Hungary from 14 July to 30 July.

== Swimming ==
Suriname has received a Universality invitation from FINA to send three swimmers (one man and two women) to the World Championships.

Athlete	Event	Heat		Semifinal		Final	
Athlete	Event	Time	Rank	Time	Rank	Time	Rank
Renzo Tjon-A-Joe	Men's 50 m freestyle	23.51	65	did not advance			
Xiomara Getrouw	Women's 50 m backstroke	30.74	47	did not advance			
Evita Leter	Women's 50 m breaststroke	33.77	34	did not advance			
Evita Leter	Women's 100 m breaststroke	1:17.48	=44	did not advance			
