= List of Beninese records in swimming =

The Beninese records in swimming are the fastest ever performances of swimmers from the Benin, which are recognised and ratified by the Federation Beninoise de Natation.

All records were set in finals unless noted otherwise.

== Long Course (50 m) ==
=== Men ===
Event	Time		Name	Club	Date	Meet	Location	Ref
50 m freestyle	24.61	h	Emmanuel Kpanou	Benin	13 March 2024	African Games	Accra, Ghana	
100 m freestyle	55.14	h	Marc Dansou	Benin	20 August 2022	African Championships	Tunis, Tunisia	
200 m freestyle	2:32.88	h	Mahugnigan Tevoedjre	Benin	30 April 2024	African Championships	Luanda, Angola	
400 m freestyle								
800 m freestyle								
1500 m freestyle								
50 m backstroke	26.52	sf	Alexis Kpade	Benin	11 November 2025	Islamic Solidarity Games	Riyadh, Saudi Arabia	
100 m backstroke	57.50	h	Alexis Kpade	Benin	28 July 2025	World Championships	Singapore, Singapore	
200 m backstroke	2:04.55		Alexis Kpade	Benin	6 May 2026	African Championships	Oran, Algeria	
50 m breaststroke	31.09	h	Emmanuel Kpanou	Benin	12 March 2024	African Games	Accra, Ghana	
100 m breaststroke	1:20.20	h	Kuassi Zianse	Benin	30 April 2024	African Championships	Luanda, Angola	
200 m breaststroke								
50 m butterfly	24.88	h, =	Emmanuel Kpanou	Benin	10 March 2024	African Games	Accra, Ghana	
50 m butterfly	24.88	h, =	Emmanuel Kpanou	Benin	30 April 2024	African Championships	Luanda, Angola	
100 m butterfly	58.62	h	Emmanuel Kpanou	Benin	11 March 2024	African Games	Accra, Ghana	
200 m butterfly								
200 m individual medley	2:29.77	h	Alexis Kpade	Benin	13 March 2024	African Games	Accra, Ghana	
400 m individual medley								
4×100 m freestyle relay	3:59.32	h	Marc Dansou (57.89); Alexis Kpade (55.82); Emmanuel Kpanou (1:01.14); Kuassi Zianse (1:04.47)	Benin	12 March 2024	African Games	Accra, Ghana	
4×200 m freestyle relay								
4×100 m medley relay	4:13.30		Alexis Kpade (59.00); Marc Dansou (1:11.87); Emmanuel Kpanou (58.23); Kuassi Zianse (1:04.20)	Benin	13 March 2024	African Games	Accra, Ghana	

Legend: # – Record awaiting ratification by Federation Beninoise de Natation; WR – World record; AF – African record;
Records not set in finals: h – heat; sf – semifinal; r – relay 1st leg; rh – relay heat 1st leg; b – B final; † – en route to final mark; so – swim-off; tt – time trial

=== Women ===
Event	Time		Name	Club	Date	Meet	Location	Ref
50 m freestyle	29.75	h	Nafissath Radji	Benin	13 March 2024	African Games	Accra, Ghana	
100 m freestyle	1:05.61		Nafissath Radji	Benin	27 Mai 2022	African Zone 2 Championships	Dakar, Senegal	
200 m freestyle								
400 m freestyle								
800 m freestyle								
1500 m freestyle								
50 m backstroke	34.38	h	Nafissath Radji	Benin	11 March 2024	African Games	Accra, Ghana	
100 m backstroke	1:18.84	h	Nafissath Radji	Benin	12 March 2024	African Games	Accra, Ghana	
200 m backstroke								
50 m breaststroke	45.80	h, †	Charmel Morgane Faosite Sogbadji	Benin	29 July 2013	World Championships	Barcelona, Spain	
100 m breaststroke	1:43.41	h	Charmel Morgane Faosite Sogbadji	Benin	29 July 2013	World Championships	Barcelona, Spain	
200 m breaststroke								
50 m butterfly	28.88	h	Hasna Hougue	Benin	6 May 2026	African Championships	Oran, Algeria	
100 m butterfly								
200 m butterfly								
200 m individual medley								
400 m individual medley								
4×100 m freestyle relay								
4×200 m freestyle relay								
4×100 m medley relay								

Legend: # – Record awaiting ratification by Federation Beninoise de Natation; WR – World record; AF – African record;
Records not set in finals: h – heat; sf – semifinal; r – relay 1st leg; rh – relay heat 1st leg; b – B final; † – en route to final mark; so – swim-off; tt – time trial

=== Mixed relay ===
Event	Time		Name	Club	Date	Meet	Location	Ref
4 × 100 m freestyle relay	4:03.05	h	Marc Dansou; Nafissath Radji; Ionnah Douillet; Alexis Kpade	Benin	30 April 2024	African Championships	Luanda, Angola	
4 × 100 m medley relay	4:29.18	h	Nafissath Radji; Marc Dansou; Emmanuel Kpanou; Ionnah Douillet	Benin	30 April 2024	African Championships	Luanda, Angola	

Legend: # – Record awaiting ratification by Federation Beninoise de Natation; WR – World record; AF – African record;
Records not set in finals: h – heat; so – swim-off

== Short Course (25 m) ==
=== Men ===
Event	Time		Name	Club	Date	Meet	Location	Ref
50 m freestyle	22.13	h	Orhan Dine	Benin	14 December 2024	World Championships	Budapest, Hungary	
100 m freestyle	53.06	h	Marc Dansou	Benin	20 December 2021	World Championships	Abu Dhabi, United Arab Emirates	
200 m freestyle	2:50.93	h	Godonou Wilfrid Tevoedjre	Benin	15 December 2010	World Championships	Dubai, United Arab Emirates	
400 m freestyle								
800 m freestyle								
1500 m freestyle								
50 m backstroke	35.30	h	Ablam Hodadje Awoussou	Benin	14 December 2012	World Championships	Istanbul, Turkey	
100 m backstroke								
200 m backstroke								
50 m breaststroke	28.56	h	Orhan Dine	Benin	14 December 2024	World Championships	Budapest, Hungary	
100 m breaststroke	1:21.44	h	Gildas Koumondji	Benin	11 December 2018	World Championships	Hangzhou, China	
200 m breaststroke								
50 m butterfly	24.49	h	Jefferson Kpanou	Benin	10 December 2024	World Championships	Budapest, Hungary	
100 m butterfly	56.33	h	Jefferson Kpanou	Benin	13 December 2024	World Championships	Budapest, Hungary	
200 m butterfly								
100 m individual medley								
200 m individual medley								
400 m individual medley								
4×50 m freestyle relay								
4×100 m freestyle relay								
4×200 m freestyle relay								
4×50 m medley relay								
4×100 m medley relay								

Legend: # – Record awaiting ratification by Federation Beninoise de Natation; WR – World record; AF – African record;
Records not set in finals: h – heat; sf – semifinal; r – relay 1st leg; rh – relay heat 1st leg; b – B final; † – en route to final mark; so – swim-off; tt – time trial

=== Women ===
Event	Time		Name	Club	Date	Meet	Location	Ref
50 m freestyle	27.29	h	Ionnah Douillet	Benin	14 December 2024	World Championships	Budapest, Hungary	
100 m freestyle	1:06.31	h	Nafissath Radji	Benin	17 December 2021	World Championships	Abu Dhabi, United Arab Emirates	
200 m freestyle								
400 m freestyle								
800 m freestyle								
1500 m freestyle								
50 m backstroke								
100 m backstroke								
200 m backstroke								
50 m breaststroke	41.13	h	Nafissath Radji	Benin	11 December 2018	World Championships	Hangzhou, China	
100 m breaststroke	1:41.01	h	Chaemel Morgane Faosite Sogbadji	Benin	17 December 2010	World Championships	Dubai, United Arab Emirates	
200 m breaststroke								
50 m butterfly	37.90	h	Laraïba Seibou	Benin	13 December 2018	World Championships	Hangzhou, China	
100 m butterfly								
200 m butterfly								
100 m individual medley								
200 m individual medley								
400 m individual medley								
4×50 m freestyle relay								
4×100 m freestyle relay								
4×200 m freestyle relay								
4×50 m medley relay								
4×100 m medley relay								

Legend: # – Record awaiting ratification by Federation Beninoise de Natation; WR – World record; AF – African record;
Records not set in finals: h – heat; sf – semifinal; r – relay 1st leg; rh – relay heat 1st leg; b – B final; † – en route to final mark; so – swim-off; tt – time trial

=== Mixed relay ===
Event	Time		Name	Club	Date	Meet	Location	Ref
4×50 m freestyle relay								
4×50 m medley relay	2:13.02	h	Nafissath Radji (36.22); Gildas Koumondji (35.87); Jefferson Kpanou (30.13); Laraïba Seibou (30.80)	Benin	13 December 2018	World Championships	Hangzhou, China	

Legend: # – Record awaiting ratification by Federation Beninoise de Natation; WR – World record; AF – African record;
Records not set in finals: h – heat; so – swim-off
