= Suriname at the 2013 World Aquatics Championships =

- Flag of Suriname
- World Aquatics code: SUR
- National federation: Surinaamse Zwem Bond
- Website: www.surinameswimming.com

in Barcelona, Spain
- Competitors: 3 in 1 sports
- Medals: Gold 0 Silver 0 Bronze 0 Total 0

World Aquatics Championships appearances
- 1973; 1975; 1978; 1982; 1986; 1991; 1994; 1998; 2001; 2003; 2005; 2007; 2009; 2011; 2013; 2015; 2017; 2019; 2022; 2023; 2024; 2025

Suriname is competing at the 2013 World Aquatics Championships in Barcelona, Spain between 19 July and 4 August 2013.

== Swimming ==
Surinamese swimmers achieved qualifying standards in the following events (up to a maximum of 2 swimmers in each event at the A-standard entry time, and 1 at the B-standard):

Men

Athlete	Event	Heat		Semifinal		Final	
Athlete	Event	Time	Rank	Time	Rank	Time	Rank
Rafael van Leeuwaarde	50 m breaststroke	29.66	57	did not advance			
Rafael van Leeuwaarde	100 m breaststroke	1:06.22	61	did not advance			

Women

Athlete	Event	Heat		Semifinal		Final	
Athlete	Event	Time	Rank	Time	Rank	Time	Rank
Evita Leter	50 m breaststroke	33.55	53	did not advance			
Evita Leter	100 m breaststroke	1:15.31	49	did not advance			
Chinyere Pigot	50 m freestyle	25.83 NR	28	did not advance			
Chinyere Pigot	100 m freestyle	57.34	41	did not advance			
