= Suriname at the 2015 World Aquatics Championships =

- Flag of Suriname
- FINA code: SUR
- National federation: Surinaamse Zwem Bond
- Website: www.surinameswimming.com

in Kazan, Russia
- Competitors: 4 in 1 sport
- Medals: Gold 0 Silver 0 Bronze 0 Total 0

World Aquatics Championships appearances
- 1973; 1975; 1978; 1982; 1986; 1991; 1994; 1998; 2001; 2003; 2005; 2007; 2009; 2011; 2013; 2015; 2017; 2019; 2022; 2023; 2024

Suriname competed at the 2015 World Aquatics Championships in Kazan, Russia from 24 July to 9 August 2015.

== Swimming ==
Surinamese swimmers have achieved qualifying standards in the following events (up to a maximum of 2 swimmers in each event at the A-standard entry time, and 1 at the B-standard):

Men

Athlete	Event	Heat		Semifinal		Final	
Athlete	Event	Time	Rank	Time	Rank	Time	Rank
Zuhayr Pigot	50 m butterfly	24.76	43	did not advance			
Zuhayr Pigot	100 m butterfly	54.20	42	did not advance			
Renzo Tjon-A-Joe	50 m freestyle	22.66	=55	did not advance			
Renzo Tjon-A-Joe	100 m freestyle	50.12	42	did not advance			

Women

Athlete	Event	Heat		Semifinal		Final	
Athlete	Event	Time	Rank	Time	Rank	Time	Rank
Evita Leter	50 m breaststroke	33.19	45	did not advance			
Evita Leter	100 m breaststroke	1:17.97	57	did not advance			
Chinyere Pigot	50 m freestyle	26.18	46	did not advance			
Chinyere Pigot	100 m freestyle	57.36	48	did not advance			
