= Suriname at the 2019 World Aquatics Championships =

- Flag of Suriname
- FINA code: SUR
- National federation: Surinaamse Zwem Bond

in Gwangju, South Korea
- Competitors: 4 in 1 sport
- Medals: Gold 0 Silver 0 Bronze 0 Total 0

World Aquatics Championships appearances
- 1973; 1975; 1978; 1982; 1986; 1991; 1994; 1998; 2001; 2003; 2005; 2007; 2009; 2011; 2013; 2015; 2017; 2019; 2022; 2023; 2024

Suriname competed at the 2019 World Aquatics Championships in Gwangju, South Korea from 12 to 28 July.

== Swimming ==
Suriname entered four swimmers.

Men

Athlete	Event	Heat		Semifinal		Final	
Athlete	Event	Time	Rank	Time	Rank	Time	Rank
Irvin Hoost	50 m butterfly	25.97	66	did not advance			
Irvin Hoost	100 m butterfly	DSQ		did not advance			
Renzo Tjon-A-Joe	50 m freestyle	22.33	=21	did not advance			
Renzo Tjon-A-Joe	100 m freestyle	49.85	39	did not advance			

Women

Athlete	Event	Heat		Semifinal		Final	
Athlete	Event	Time	Rank	Time	Rank	Time	Rank
Xiomara Getrouw	50 m backstroke	31.42	34	did not advance			
Evita Leter	50 m breaststroke	34.58	41	did not advance			
Evita Leter	100 m breaststroke	1:20.89	51	did not advance			
