= 2024 World Aquatics Swimming Championships (25 m) – Women's 50 metre freestyle =

Swimming competition

Women's 50 metre freestyle at the 2024 World Aquatics Swimming Championships (25 m)
- Venue: Duna Arena
- Location: Budapest, Hungary
- Dates: 14 December (heats and semifinals); 15 December (final)
- Competitors: 94 from 85 nations
- Winning time: 22.83 WR

Medalists
gold medal	Gretchen Walsh	United States
silver medal	Kate Douglass	United States
bronze medal	Katarzyna Wasick	Poland

The women's 50 metre freestyle event at the 2024 World Aquatics Swimming Championships (25 m) was held from 14 to 15 December 2024 at the Duna Arena in Budapest, Hungary.

== Records ==
Prior to the competition, the existing world and championship records were as follows.

World record	Ranomi Kromowidjojo (NED)	22.93	Berlin, Germany	7 August 2017
Competition record	Emma McKeon (AUS)	23.04	Melbourne, Australia	17 December 2022

The following record was established during the competition:

Date	Event	Name	Nationality	Time	Record
14 December	Heat 8	Gretchen Walsh	United States	23.02	CR
14 December	Semifinal 2	Gretchen Walsh	United States	22.87	WR
15 December	Final	Gretchen Walsh	United States	22.83	WR

== Results ==
=== Heats ===
The heats were started on 14 December at 9:53.

Rank	Heat	Lane	Name	Nationality	Time	Notes
1	8	3	Gretchen Walsh	United States	23.02	Q, CR, AM
2	9	5	Kate Douglass	United States	23.20	Q
3	10	4	Katarzyna Wasick	Poland	23.64	Q
4	10	5	Arina Surkova	Neutral Athletes B	23.86	Q
5	9	2	Silvia Di Pietro	Italy	23.88	Q
5	10	2	Mélanie Henique	France	23.88	Q
7	9	4	Sara Curtis	Italy	23.93	Q
8	8	5	Meg Harris	Australia	23.98	Q
8	9	3	Liu Shuhan	China	23.98	Q
10	7	4	Eva Okaro	Great Britain	24.02	Q
11	8	4	Alexandria Perkins	Australia	24.11	Q
12	7	3	Caitlin de Lange	South Africa	24.14	Q, AF
13	9	1	Maaike de Waard	Netherlands	24.20	Q
14	8	6	Barbora Janíčková	Czech Republic	24.27	Q
15	9	6	Daria Trofimova	Neutral Athletes B	24.31	Q
16	10	7	Milou van Wijk	Netherlands	24.33	Q
17	9	0	Jana Pavalić	Croatia	24.34	R
18	10	3	Danielle Hill	Ireland	24.35	R
19	9	7	Sara Junevik	Sweden	24.39	
19	9	9	Jenjira Srisa-Ard	Thailand	24.39	NR
21	10	6	Analia Pigrée	France	24.42	
22	8	7	Kalia Antoniou	Cyprus	24.50	
23	8	2	Yume Jinno	Japan	24.51	
24	7	7	Nele Schulze	Germany	24.53	
25	8	1	Petra Senanszky	Hungary	24.55	
26	8	0	Kornelia Fiedkiewicz	Poland	24.57	
27	8	8	Theodora Drakou	Greece	24.58	NR
28	8	9	Nina Jazy	Germany	24.61	
29	9	8	Lillian Slušná	Slovakia	24.64	
30	6	3	Jillian Crooks	Cayman Islands	24.70	NR
31	7	2	Li Sum Yiu	Hong Kong	24.80	
31	7	5	Smiltė Plytnykaitė	Lithuania	24.80	
31	7	9	Zoe Pedersen	New Zealand	24.80	
34	6	4	Mari Moen	Norway	24.85	
35	6	2	Marina Spadoni	El Salvador	24.86	NR
35	10	1	Hur Yeon-kyung	South Korea	24.86	
37	7	1	Penny Oleksiak	Canada	24.90	
37	10	9	María Daza	Spain	24.90	
39	6	7	Kirabo Namutebi	Uganda	24.93	NR
40	6	6	Yeo Chiok Sze	Singapore	25.00	
41	10	8	Xie Ziqi	China	25.07	
42	6	5	Amel Melih	Algeria	25.09	=NR
43	7	6	Lena Kreundl	Austria	25.25	
44	7	8	Jóhanna Elín Guðmundsdóttir	Iceland	25.28	
45	7	0	Rafaela Fernandini	Peru	25.41	
46	5	5	Elisabeth Timmer	Aruba	25.45	NR
47	6	9	Sara Mose	Kenya	25.62	NR
48	6	1	Nguyễn Thúy Hiền	Vietnam	25.79	
49	6	0	Elizaveta Pecherskikh	Kyrgyzstan	25.83	NR
50	5	6	Pak Mi-song	North Korea	26.11	
51	5	1	Jovana Kuljača	Montenegro	26.22	
52	5	4	Adaku Nkem Nwandu	Nigeria	26.24	
53	4	5	Varsenik Manucharyan	Armenia	26.26	NR
54	5	3	Hana Beiqi	Kosovo	26.35	
55	5	2	Oumy Diop	Senegal	26.45	NR
56	5	7	Antsa Rabejaona	Madagascar	26.46	NR
57	4	4	Aunjelique Liddie	Netherlands Antilles	26.47	
58	6	8	Rhanishka Gibbs	Bahamas	26.54	
59	3	0	Davia Richardson	Belize	26.60	
60	5	8	Christina Rach	Eritrea	26.76	
61	5	0	Darielys Ortiz	Dominican Republic	26.93	
62	4	7	Jhnayali Tokome-Garap	Papua New Guinea	26.96	
63	4	1	Naekeisha Louis	Saint Lucia	26.97	
64	4	2	Noelie Annette Lacour	Gabon	27.01	NR
65	5	9	Riley Sofia Miller	United States Virgin Islands	27.14	NR
66	4	6	Aleka Persaud	Guyana	27.15	
67	4	3	Ionnah Eliane Douillet	Benin	27.29	NR
68	4	8	Batsanalyn Maral	Mongolia	27.37	
69	3	3	Maria Lopes Freitas	Angola	27.62	
70	3	4	Anastasiya Morginshtern	Turkmenistan	27.63	NR
71	3	8	Sharmeen Mohd Mharvin	Brunei	27.82	
72	1	6	Liana Planz	American Samoa	27.84	
73	3	6	Kyra Dalilah De Cuba	Curaçao	27.87	
74	4	9	Marina Abu Shamaleh	Palestine	28.01	
75	3	5	Carolann Faeamani	Tonga	28.18	
76	4	0	Kaiya Brown	Samoa	28.37	
77	2	6	Mayah Chouloute	Haiti	28.43	
78	3	2	Southada Daviau	Laos	28.55	
79	2	3	Jasmine Schofield	Dominica	28.61	
80	2	4	Maesha Saadi	Comoros	28.76	NR
81	3	1	Siwakhile Dlamini	Eswatini	28.80	
82	1	4	Chanchakriya Kheun	Cambodia	29.14	
83	3	7	Tayamika Changanamuno	Malawi	29.58	
84	2	2	Saba Sultan	Kuwait	29.65	
85	3	9	Anushiya Tandukar	Nepal	29.81	
86	1	1	Aragsan Mugabo	Rwanda	30.05	
87	2	7	Grace Manuela Nguelo'O	Cameroon	30.72	
88	2	1	Leena Mohamedahmed	Sudan	30.78	
89	2	8	Lina Alemayehu Selo	Ethiopia	31.31	
90	1	3	Aliyana Kachra	Tanzania	31.75	
91	2	9	Emiliya Khalikova	Tajikistan	32.49	
92	1	7	Hazel Alamy	Sierra Leone	36.36	
93	1	2	Xiang Kombate	Togo	41.69	
94	1	5	Salena Marlin	Timor-Leste	42.76	
	1	0	Ibrahim Miandabu Anyatu	Democratic Republic of the Congo	Did not start	
	1	8	Mimarcia Ie	Guinea-Bissau	Did not start	
	2	0	Mariama Touré	Guinea	Did not start	
	2	5	Angelina Smythe	Seychelles	Did not start	
	10	0	Fanny Teijonsalo	Finland	Did not start	

=== Semifinals ===
The semifinals were started on 14 December at 17:48.

Rank	Heat	Lane	Name	Nationality	Time	Notes
1	2	4	Gretchen Walsh	United States	22.87	Q, WR
2	1	4	Kate Douglass	United States	23.35	Q
3	2	5	Katarzyna Wasick	Poland	23.46	Q
4	2	3	Silvia Di Pietro	Italy	23.68	Q, NR
5	1	5	Arina Surkova	Neutral Athletes B	23.69	Q
6	1	2	Eva Okaro	Great Britain	23.71	Q
7	1	6	Meg Harris	Australia	23.74	Q
8	2	6	Sara Curtis	Italy	23.76	Q
9	1	3	Mélanie Henique	France	23.89	
10	1	1	Barbora Janíčková	Czech Republic	23.99	NR
11	2	7	Alexandria Perkins	Australia	24.01	
12	2	2	Liu Shuhan	China	24.03	
13	1	8	Milou van Wijk	Netherlands	24.08	
14	2	8	Daria Trofimova	Neutral Athletes B	24.11	
15	1	7	Caitlin de Lange	South Africa	24.21	
16	2	1	Maaike de Waard	Netherlands	24.22	

=== Final ===
The final was held on 15 December at 17:32.

Rank	Lane	Name	Nationality	Time	Notes
1st place, gold medalist(s)	4	Gretchen Walsh	United States	22.83	WR
2nd place, silver medalist(s)	5	Kate Douglass	United States	23.05	
3rd place, bronze medalist(s)	3	Katarzyna Wasick	Poland	23.37	
4	7	Eva Okaro	Great Britain	23.66	WJ
5	1	Meg Harris	Australia	23.73	
6	6	Silvia Di Pietro	Italy	23.85	
7	8	Sara Curtis	Italy	23.87	
8	2	Arina Surkova	Neutral Athletes B	23.95	
