= Swimming at the 2023 World Aquatics Championships – Women's 50 metre freestyle =

Women's 50 metre freestyle at the 2023 World Aquatics Championships
- Venue: Marine Messe Fukuoka
- Location: Fukuoka, Japan
- Dates: 29 July (heats and semifinals); 30 July (final)
- Competitors: 102 from 97 nations
- Winning time: 23.62

Medalists
gold medal	Sarah Sjöström	Sweden
silver medal	Shayna Jack	Australia
bronze medal	Zhang Yufei	China

The women's 50 metre freestyle competition at the 2023 World Aquatics Championships was held on 29 and 30 July 2023.

== Records ==
Prior to the competition, the existing world and championship records were as follows.

World record	Sarah Sjöström (SWE)	23.67	Budapest, Hungary	29 July 2017
Competition record	Sarah Sjöström (SWE)	23.67	Budapest, Hungary	29 July 2017

The following new records were set during this competition.

Date	Event	Name	Nationality	Time	Record
29 July	Semifinal	Sarah Sjöström	Sweden	23.61	WR

== Results ==
=== Heats ===
The heats were started on 29 July at 10:32.

Rank	Heat	Lane	Name	Nationality	Time	Notes
1	11	4	Sarah Sjöström	Sweden	23.93	Q
2	10	5	Shayna Jack	Australia	24.02	Q
3	9	4	Abbey Weitzeil	United States	24.29	Q
4	11	3	Zhang Yufei	China	24.44	Q
5	11	6	Michelle Coleman	Sweden	24.51	Q
6	9	3	Anna Hopkin	Great Britain	24.61	Q
7	10	3	Marrit Steenbergen	Netherlands	24.63	Q
8	10	4	Emma McKeon	Australia	24.69	Q
9	11	5	Katarzyna Wasick	Poland	24.71	Q
10	9	7	Julie Kepp Jensen	Denmark	24.79	Q
11	9	1	Neža Klančar	Slovenia	24.80	Q, NR
12	9	6	Valerie van Roon	Netherlands	24.82	Q
13	9	5	Gretchen Walsh	United States	24.83	Q
14	10	2	Marie Wattel	France	24.84	Q
15	10	0	Farida Osman	Egypt	24.86	Q
15	10	6	Cheng Yujie	China	24.86	Q
17	10	7	Petra Senánszky	Hungary	25.04	
18	10	9	Chiara Tarantino	Italy	25.11	
19	11	0	Theodora Drakou	Greece	25.12	
20	9	2	Rikako Ikee	Japan	25.27	
21	11	2	Mélanie Henique	France	25.31	
22	11	1	Kalia Antoniou	Cyprus	25.33	
23	11	7	Emma Chelius	South Africa	25.34	
24	8	1	Teresa Ivan	Slovakia	25.39	
25	11	9	Stephanie Balduccini	Brazil	25.40	
26	9	9	Jeong So-eun	South Korea	25.45	
27	8	9	Ana Sofia Revilak	Mexico	25.48	
28	10	1	Quah Ting Wen	Singapore	25.52	
29	8	4	Tam Hoi Lam	Hong Kong	25.54	
30	7	0	Anicka Delgado	Ecuador	25.55	
30	10	8	Danielle Hill	Ireland	25.55	
32	7	2	Jillian Crooks	Cayman Islands	25.66	NR
33	8	0	Andrea Berrino	Argentina	25.67	
34	8	5	Barbora Seemanová	Czech Republic	25.68	
35	11	8	Jenjira Srisaard	Thailand	25.70	
36	8	6	Hanna Henderson	Canada	25.71	
37	9	8	Roos Vanotterdijk	Belgium	25.74	
38	8	7	Sirena Rowe	Colombia	25.79	
39	8	2	Nina Kost	Switzerland	25.80	
40	7	4	Cherelle Thompson	Trinidad and Tobago	25.85	
41	7	3	Amel Melih	Algeria	25.89	
42	7	6	Huang Mei-chien	Chinese Taipei	25.95	
43	7	5	Maddy Moore	Bermuda	26.06	
44	8	3	Daria Golovaty	Israel	26.11	
45	7	9	Lismar Lyon	Venezuela	26.27	
46	7	7	Ieva Maļuka	Latvia	26.29	
47	8	8	Jasmine Alkhaldi	Suspended Member Federation	26.30	
48	6	6	María José Ribera	Bolivia	26.37	
49	3	9	Maria Brunlehner	Suspended Member Federation	26.49	
50	7	1	Kirabo Namutebi	Uganda	26.54	
51	6	4	Rhanishka Gibbs	Bahamas	26.64	
52	2	0	Mia Phiri	Zambia	26.86	
53	6	2	Maxine Egner	Botswana	26.90	
54	6	3	Mariel Mencia	Dominican Republic	26.96	
55	7	8	Elisabeth Timmer	Aruba	27.01	
56	6	1	Marie Khoury	Lebanon	27.04	
57	6	5	Mikaili Charlemagne	Saint Lucia	27.10	
58	6	7	Varsenik Manucharyan	Armenia	27.26	
59	1	6	Adaku Nwandu	Nigeria	27.33	
60	5	7	Tilly Collymore	Grenada	27.35	
61	4	2	Mia Lee	Guam	27.54	NR
62	5	2	Aunjelique Liddie	Antigua and Barbuda	27.86	
63	6	0	Aleka Persaud	Guyana	27.98	
64	5	6	Mariam Mithqal	Jordan	28.02	
65	5	4	Kaiya Brown	Samoa	28.04	
66	6	8	Georgia-Leigh Vele	Papua New Guinea	28.06	
67	5	3	Kennice Greene	Saint Vincent and the Grenadines	28.23	
67	5	5	Jovana Kuljaca	Montenegro	28.23	
69	4	4	Noelani Day	Tonga	28.24	
70	2	2	Sophia Latiff	Tanzania	28.34	
71	5	0	Marina Abu Shamaleh	Palestine	28.45	
71	6	9	Bisma Khan	Pakistan	28.45	
73	5	9	Ayah Binrajab	Bahrain	28.72	
74	5	1	Anastasiya Morginshtern	Turkmenistan	28.73	
75	5	8	Maria Freitas	Angola	28.78	
76	3	0	Denise Donelli	Mozambique	28.97	
77	4	0	Kestra Kihleng	Federated States of Micronesia	29.17	
78	4	5	Ekaterina Bordachyova	Tajikistan	29.39	
79	4	6	Arleigha Hall	Turks and Caicos Islands	29.40	
80	4	3	Nafissath Radji	Benin	29.81	
81	1	5	Loane Russet	Vanuatu	30.47	
82	4	8	Sonia Khatun	Bangladesh	30.49	
83	2	6	Shoko Litulumar	Northern Mariana Islands	30.55	
84	4	9	Mashael Al-Ayed	Saudi Arabia	30.57	
85	4	1	Saba Sultan	Kuwait	30.59	
86	1	4	La Troya Pina	Cape Verde	30.71	
87	3	5	Siwakhile Dlamini	Eswatini	30.78	
88	3	3	Iman Kouraogo	Burkina Faso	31.06	
89	3	4	Ammara Pinto	Malawi	31.17	
90	2	1	Aya Mpali	Gabon	32.00	
91	3	6	Nada Arkaji	Qatar	32.11	
92	3	2	Yuri Hosei	Palau	32.14	
93	2	8	Alia Ishimwe	Burundi	32.16	
94	3	8	Maesha Saadi	Comoros	33.05	NR
95	1	2	Estelle Nguelo'o Noubissi	Cameroon	33.23	
96	3	1	Marie Amenou	Togo	33.44	
97	1	3	Lina Alemayehu Selo	Ethiopia	33.93	
98	3	7	Imelda Ximenes Belo	Timor-Leste	34.14	
99	1	7	Claudette Ishimwe	Rwanda	35.37	
100	2	7	Vanessa Bobimbo	Congo	37.37	
101	2	3	Salima Ahmadou Youssoufou	Niger	37.80	
102	2	9	Olamide Sam	Sierra Leone	48.58	
	2	4	Mariama Sow	Guinea	Did not start	
	2	5	Nina Amison	Djibouti	Did not start	
	4	7	Taffi Illis	Sint Maarten	Did not start	
	9	0	Ana Rodrigues	Portugal	Did not start	

=== Semifinals ===
The semifinals were held on 29 July at 20:16.

Rank	Heat	Lane	Name	Nationality	Time	Notes
1	2	4	Sarah Sjöström	Sweden	23.61	Q, WR
2	1	4	Shayna Jack	Australia	24.01	Q
3	1	5	Zhang Yufei	China	24.20	Q
4	2	5	Abbey Weitzeil	United States	24.27	Q
5	1	8	Cheng Yujie	China	24.56	Q
6	2	3	Michelle Coleman	Sweden	24.63	Q
7	1	6	Emma McKeon	Australia	24.67	Q
8	1	1	Marie Wattel	France	24.68	SO
8	2	6	Marrit Steenbergen	Netherlands	24.68	SO
10	1	2	Julie Kepp Jensen	Denmark	24.70	
11	2	1	Gretchen Walsh	United States	24.71	
12	2	2	Katarzyna Wasick	Poland	24.72	
13	1	3	Anna Hopkin	Great Britain	24.73	
14	1	7	Valerie van Roon	Netherlands	24.78	
15	2	7	Neža Klančar	Slovenia	24.84	
16	2	8	Farida Osman	Egypt	25.34	

==== Swim-off ====
The swim-off was held on 29 July at 22:11.

Rank	Lane	Name	Nationality	Time	Notes
1	5	Marrit Steenbergen	Netherlands	24.53	Q
2	4	Marie Wattel	France	24.62	

=== Final ===
The final was held on 30 July at 20:46.

Rank	Lane	Name	Nationality	Time	Notes
1st place, gold medalist(s)	4	Sarah Sjöström	Sweden	23.62	
2nd place, silver medalist(s)	5	Shayna Jack	Australia	24.10	
3rd place, bronze medalist(s)	3	Zhang Yufei	China	24.15	
4	6	Abbey Weitzeil	United States	24.32	
5	1	Emma McKeon	Australia	24.35	
6	2	Cheng Yujie	China	24.45	
7	7	Michelle Coleman	Sweden	24.46	
8	8	Marrit Steenbergen	Netherlands	24.61	
