= Comoros at the 2013 World Aquatics Championships =

- Flag of the Comoros
- World Aquatics code: COM
- National federation: Comoros Swimming Federation

in Barcelona, Spain
- Competitors: 1 in 1 sports
- Medals: Gold 0 Silver 0 Bronze 0 Total 0

World Aquatics Championships appearances
- 2007; 2009; 2011; 2013; 2015; 2017; 2019; 2022; 2023; 2024; 2025

Comoros competed at the 2013 World Aquatics Championships in Barcelona, Spain, from 19 July to 4 August 2013.

== Swimming ==
Comoran swimmers achieved qualifying standards in the following events (up to a maximum of two swimmers in each event at the A-standard entry time, and one at the B-standard):

Women

Athlete	Event	Heat		Semifinal		Final	
Athlete	Event	Time	Rank	Time	Rank	Time	Rank
Nazlati Mohamed Andhumdine	50 m freestyle	38.45	82	did not advance			
Nazlati Mohamed Andhumdine	100 m freestyle	1:33.88	73	did not advance			
