= Benin at the 2023 World Aquatics Championships =

- Flag of Benin
- FINA code: BEN
- National federation: Benin Swimming Federation

in Fukuoka, Japan
- Competitors: 2 in 1 sport
- Medals: Gold 0 Silver 0 Bronze 0 Total 0

World Aquatics Championships appearances
- 1973; 1975; 1978; 1982; 1986; 1991; 1994; 1998; 2001; 2003; 2005; 2007; 2009; 2011; 2013; 2015; 2017; 2019; 2022; 2023; 2024

Benin is set to compete at the 2023 World Aquatics Championships in Fukuoka, Japan from 14 to 30 July.

== Swimming ==
Algeria entered 2 swimmers.

Men

Athlete	Event	Heat		Semifinal		Final	
Athlete	Event	Time	Rank	Time	Rank	Time	Rank
Marc Dansou	50 metre freestyle	25.16	89	Did not advance			
Marc Dansou	100 metre freestyle	55.43	99	Did not advance			

Women

Athlete	Event	Heat		Semifinal		Final	
Athlete	Event	Time	Rank	Time	Rank	Time	Rank
Nafissath Radji	50 metre freestyle	29.81	80	Did not advance			
Nafissath Radji	50 metre backstroke	35.40	59	Did not advance			
