= List of Comorian records in swimming =

The Comorian records in swimming are the fastest ever performances of swimmers from the Comoros, which are recognised and ratified by the Comoros Swimming Federation.

All records were set in finals unless noted otherwise.

== Long Course (50 m) ==
=== Men ===
Event	Time		Name	Club	Date	Meet	Location	Ref
50 m freestyle	28.68	h	Hassani Azlene	Comoros	30 August 2023	Indian Ocean Island Games	Antananarivo, Madagascar	
100 m freestyle	1:02.55	h	Hadji Hassane	Comoros	30 July 2025	World Championships	Singapore, Singapore	
200 m freestyle								
400 m freestyle								
800 m freestyle								
1500 m freestyle								
50 m backstroke								
100 m backstroke								
200 m backstroke								
50 m breaststroke	36.61	h	Athoumane Athoumane	Comoros	25 July 2017	World Championships	Budapest, Hungary	
100 m breaststroke	1:24.99	h	Mdoiouhoma Fayadi	Comoros	30 April 2024	African Championships	Luanda, Angola	
200 m breaststroke								
50 m butterfly	30.53	h	Athoumane Solihi	Comoros	23 July 2017	World Championships	Budapest, Hungary	
100 m butterfly	1:21.89	h	Chaoili Aonzoudine	Comoros	7 August 2015	World Championships	Kazan, Russia	
200 m butterfly								
200 m individual medley								
400 m individual medley								
4×100 m freestyle relay								
4×200 m freestyle relay								
4×100 m medley relay								

Legend: # – Record awaiting ratification by Comoros Swimming Federation; WR – World record; AF – African record;
Records not set in finals: h – heat; sf – semifinal; r – relay 1st leg; rh – relay heat 1st leg; b – B final; † – en route to final mark; so – swim-off; tt – time trial

=== Women ===
Event	Time		Name	Club	Date	Meet	Location	Ref
50 m freestyle	33.05	h	Maesha Saadi	Comoros	29 July 2023	World Championships	Fukuoka, Japan	
100 m freestyle	1:33.88	h	Nazlati Mohamed Andhumdine	Comoros	1 August 2013	World Championships	Barcelona, Spain	
200 m freestyle								
400 m freestyle								
800 m freestyle								
1500 m freestyle								
50 m backstroke	48.32	h	Nazlati Mohamed Andhumdine	Comoros	26 July 2017	World Championships	Budapest, Hungary	
100 m backstroke								
200 m backstroke								
50 m breaststroke	45.75	h	Nazlati Mohamed Andhumdine	Comoros	8 August 2015	World Championships	Kazan, Russia	
100 m breaststroke								
200 m breaststroke								
50 m butterfly								
100 m butterfly								
200 m butterfly								
200 m individual medley								
400 m individual medley								
4×100 m freestyle relay								
4×200 m freestyle relay								
4×100 m medley relay								

Legend: # – Record awaiting ratification by Comoros Swimming Federation; WR – World record; AF – African record;
Records not set in finals: h – heat; sf – semifinal; r – relay 1st leg; rh – relay heat 1st leg; b – B final; † – en route to final mark; so – swim-off; tt – time trial

== Short Course (25 m) ==
=== Men ===
Event	Time		Name	Club	Date	Meet	Location	Ref
50 m freestyle	26.47	h	Chaoili Chaoili	Comoros	4 December 2014	World Championships	Doha, Qatar	
100 m freestyle								
200 m freestyle								
400 m freestyle								
800 m freestyle								
1500 m freestyle								
50 m backstroke								
100 m backstroke								
200 m backstroke								
50 m breaststroke								
100 m breaststroke								
200 m breaststroke								
50 m butterfly	31.08	h	Chaoili Chaoili	Comoros	5 December 2014	World Championships	Doha, Qatar	
100 m butterfly								
200 m butterfly								
100 m individual medley								
200 m individual medley								
400 m individual medley								
4×50 m freestyle relay								
4×100 m freestyle relay								
4×200 m freestyle relay								
4×50 m medley relay								
4×100 m medley relay								

Legend: # – Record awaiting ratification by Comoros Swimming Federation; WR – World record; AF – African record;
Records not set in finals: h – heat; sf – semifinal; r – relay 1st leg; rh – relay heat 1st leg; b – B final; † – en route to final mark; so – swim-off; tt – time trial

=== Women ===
Event	Time		Name	Club	Date	Meet	Location	Ref
50 m freestyle	28.76	h	Maesha Saadi	Comoros	14 December 2024	World Championships	Budapest, Hungary	
100 m freestyle								
200 m freestyle								
400 m freestyle								
800 m freestyle								
1500 m freestyle								
50m backstroke								
100m backstroke								
200m backstroke								
50 m breaststroke	37.51	h	Maesha Saadi	Comoros	14 December 2024	World Championships	Budapest, Hungary	
100 m breaststroke								
200 m breaststroke								
50 m butterfly								
100 m butterfly								
200 m butterfly								
100 m individual medley								
200 m individual medley								
400 m individual medley								
4×50 m freestyle relay								
4×100 m freestyle relay								
4×200 m freestyle relay								
4×50 m medley relay								
4×100 m medley relay								

Legend: # – Record awaiting ratification by Comoros Swimming Federation; WR – World record; AF – African record;
Records not set in finals: h – heat; sf – semifinal; r – relay 1st leg; rh – relay heat 1st leg; b – B final; † – en route to final mark; so – swim-off; tt – time trial
