= Benin at the 2024 World Aquatics Championships =

- Flag of Benin
- FINA code: BEN
- National federation: Benin Swimming Federation

in Doha, Qatar
- Competitors: 3 in 1 sport
- Medals: Gold 0 Silver 0 Bronze 0 Total 0

World Aquatics Championships appearances
- 1973; 1975; 1978; 1982; 1986; 1991; 1994; 1998; 2001; 2003; 2005; 2007; 2009; 2011; 2013; 2015; 2017; 2019; 2022; 2023; 2024

Benin competed at the 2024 World Aquatics Championships in Doha, Qatar from 2 to 18 February.

== Competitors ==
The following is the list of competitors in the Championships.

Sport	Men	Women	Total
Swimming	2	1	3
Total	2	1	3

== Swimming ==
Benin entered 3 swimmers.

Men

Athlete	Event	Heat		Semifinal		Final	
Athlete	Event	Time	Rank	Time	Rank	Time	Rank
Alexis Kpade	100 metre backstroke	58.03	42	Did not advance			
Alexis Kpade	200 metre individual medley	2:07.25	30	Did not advance			
Jefferson Kpanou	50 metre freestyle	24.83	77	Did not advance			
Jefferson Kpanou	100 metre freestyle	57.54	94	Did not advance			

Women

Athlete	Event	Heat		Semifinal		Final	
Athlete	Event	Time	Rank	Time	Rank	Time	Rank
Ionnah Eliane Douillet	50 metre freestyle	DSQ		Did not advance			
Ionnah Eliane Douillet	100 metre freestyle	1:01.88	57	Did not advance			
