= Comoros at the 2017 World Aquatics Championships =

Comoros at the 2015 World Aquatics Championships
- Flag of the Comoros
- FINA code: COM
- National federation: Comoros Swimming Federation

in Budapest, Hungary
- Competitors: 3 in 1 sport
- Medals: Gold 0 Silver 0 Bronze 0 Total 0

World Aquatics Championships appearances
- 2007; 2009; 2011; 2013; 2015; 2017; 2019; 2022; 2023; 2024

Comoros competed at the 2017 World Aquatics Championships in Budapest, Hungary from 14 July to 30 July.

== Swimming ==
Comoros has received a Universality invitation from FINA to send three swimmers (two men and one woman) to the World Championships.

Athlete	Event	Heat		Semifinal		Final	
Athlete	Event	Time	Rank	Time	Rank	Time	Rank
Chaoili Aonzoudine	Men's 50 m freestyle	DNS		Did not advance			
Chaoili Aonzoudine	Men's 50 m backstroke	DNS		Did not advance			
Athoumane Solihi	Men's 50 m breaststroke	36.61	78	Did not advance			
Athoumane Solihi	Men's 50 m butterfly	30.53	79	Did not advance			
Nazlati Mohamed Andhumdine	Women's 50 m freestyle	DNS		Did not advance			
Nazlati Mohamed Andhumdine	Women's 50 m backstroke	48.32	63	Did not advance			
