= Seibou =

Seibou is both a given name and a surname. Notable people with the name include:

- Séïbou Mama (born 1995), Beninese footballer
- Laraïba Seibou (born 2000), Beninese swimmer
