= Benin at the 2017 World Aquatics Championships =

- Flag of Benin
- FINA code: BEN
- National federation: Benin Swimming Federation

in Budapest, Hungary
- Competitors: 3 in 1 sport
- Medals: Gold 0 Silver 0 Bronze 0 Total 0

World Aquatics Championships appearances
- 1973; 1975; 1978; 1982; 1986; 1991; 1994; 1998; 2001; 2003; 2005; 2007; 2009; 2011; 2013; 2015; 2017; 2019; 2022; 2023; 2024

Benin competed at the 2017 World Aquatics Championships in Budapest, Hungary from 14 July to 30 July.

== Swimming ==
Benin has received a Universality invitation from FINA to send three swimmers (two men and one woman) to the World Championships.

Athlete	Event	Heat		Semifinal		Final	
Athlete	Event	Time	Rank	Time	Rank	Time	Rank
Ablam Awoussou	Men's 50 m backstroke	34.47	55	did not advance			
Ablam Awoussou	Men's 50 m breaststroke	36.34	77	did not advance			
Jefferson Kpanou	Men's 50 m freestyle	28.29	115	did not advance			
Jefferson Kpanou	Men's 100 m freestyle	1:10.40	110	did not advance			
Nafissath Radji	Women's 50 m freestyle	32.53	81	did not advance			
Nafissath Radji	Women's 50 m butterfly	42.12	59	did not advance			
