= Comoros at the 2011 World Aquatics Championships =

- Flag of the Comoros
- FINA code: COM
- National federation: Comoros Swimming Federation

in Shanghai, China
- Competitors: 3 in 1 sports
- Medals: Gold 0 Silver 0 Bronze 0 Total 0

World Aquatics Championships appearances
- 2007; 2009; 2011; 2013; 2015; 2017; 2019; 2022; 2023; 2024

Comoros competed at the 2011 World Aquatics Championships in Shanghai, China between July 16 and 31, 2011.

== Swimming ==
Comoros qualified 3 swimmers.

Men

Athlete	Event	Heats		Semifinals		Final	
Athlete	Event	Time	Rank	Time	Rank	Time	Rank
Athoumani Youssouf	50 m freestyle	28.52	96	did not advance			
Athoumani Youssouf	100 m freestyle	1:04.75	100	did not advance			
Ahmed Chawali	50 m freestyle	28.82	100	did not advance			
Ahmed Chawali	100 m freestyle	DSQ		did not advance			

Women

Athlete	Event	Heats		Semifinals		Final	
Athlete	Event	Time	Rank	Time	Rank	Time	Rank
Ayouba Ali Sihame	100 m freestyle	1:21.54	77	did not advance			
