= Suriname at the 2023 World Aquatics Championships =

- Flag of Suriname
- FINA code: SUR
- National federation: Surinaamse Zwem Bond

in Fukuoka, Japan
- Competitors: 2 in 1 sport
- Medals: Gold 0 Silver 0 Bronze 0 Total 0

World Aquatics Championships appearances
- 1973; 1975; 1978; 1982; 1986; 1991; 1994; 1998; 2001; 2003; 2005; 2007; 2009; 2011; 2013; 2015; 2017; 2019; 2022; 2023; 2024

Suriname is set to compete at the 2023 World Aquatics Championships in Fukuoka, Japan from 14 to 30 July.

== Swimming ==
Suriname entered 2 swimmers.

Men

Athlete	Event	Heat		Semifinal		Final	
Athlete	Event	Time	Rank	Time	Rank	Time	Rank
Jeno Heyns	50 metre backstroke	28.30	55	Did not advance			
Jeno Heyns	50 metre butterfly	26.21	68	Did not advance			
Hendrik Powdar	1500 metre freestyle	17:58.15	29	—		Did not advance	
Hendrik Powdar	50 metre breaststroke	30.75	51	Did not advance			
