= Ethiopia at the 2015 World Aquatics Championships =

- Flag of Ethiopia
- World Aquatics code: ETH
- National federation: Ethiopian Swimming Federation

in Kazan, Russia
- Competitors: 3 in 1 sport
- Medals: Gold 0 Silver 0 Bronze 0 Total 0

World Aquatics Championships appearances
- 2009; 2011; 2013; 2015; 2017; 2019; 2022; 2023; 2024; 2025

Ethiopia competed at the 2015 World Aquatics Championships in Kazan, Russia from 24 July to 9 August 2015.

== Swimming ==
Ethiopian swimmers have achieved qualifying standards in the following events (up to a maximum of 2 swimmers in each event at the A-standard entry time, and 1 at the B-standard):

Men

Athlete	Event	Heat		Semifinal		Final	
Athlete	Event	Time	Rank	Time	Rank	Time	Rank
Robel Habte	100 m freestyle	1:04.41	115	did not advance			
Robel Habte	50 m butterfly	30.95	74	did not advance			
Abdelmalik Muktar	50 m freestyle	DSQ		did not advance			
Abdelmalik Muktar	50 m breaststroke	35.89	70	did not advance			

Women

Athlete	Event	Heat		Semifinal		Final	
Athlete	Event	Time	Rank	Time	Rank	Time	Rank
Rahel Gebresilassie	50 m freestyle	32.49	99	did not advance			
Rahel Gebresilassie	50 m butterfly	36.15	62	did not advance			
