= Ethiopia at the 2024 World Aquatics Championships =

- Flag of Ethiopia
- FINA code: ETH
- National federation: Ethiopian Swimming Federation

in Doha, Qatar
- Competitors: 2 in 1 sport
- Medals: Gold 0 Silver 0 Bronze 0 Total 0

World Aquatics Championships appearances
- 2009; 2011; 2013; 2015; 2017; 2019; 2022; 2023; 2024

Ethiopia competed at the 2024 World Aquatics Championships in Doha, Qatar from 2 to 18 February.

== Competitors ==
The following is the list of competitors in the Championships.

Sport	Men	Women	Total
Swimming	1	1	2
Total	1	1	2

== Swimming ==
Ethiopia entered 2 swimmers.

Men

Athlete	Event	Heat		Semifinal		Final	
Athlete	Event	Time	Rank	Time	Rank	Time	Rank
Bereket Demissie Girkebo	50 metre freestyle	28.17	109	Did not advance			
Bereket Demissie Girkebo	50 metre butterfly	30.26	63	Did not advance			

Women

Athlete	Event	Heat		Semifinal		Final	
Athlete	Event	Time	Rank	Time	Rank	Time	Rank
Lina Alemayehu Selo	50 metre freestyle	32.62	100	Did not advance			
Lina Alemayehu Selo	50 metre butterfly	36.34	56	Did not advance			
