= Comoros at the 2015 World Aquatics Championships =

- Flag of the Comoros
- FINA code: COM
- National federation: Comoros Swimming Federation

in Kazan, Russia
- Competitors: 3 in 1 sport
- Medals: Gold 0 Silver 0 Bronze 0 Total 0

World Aquatics Championships appearances
- 2007; 2009; 2011; 2013; 2015; 2017; 2019; 2022; 2023; 2024

Comoros competed at the 2015 World Aquatics Championships in Kazan, Russia from 24 July to 9 August 2015.

== Swimming ==
Comorian swimmers have achieved qualifying standards in the following events (up to a maximum of 2 swimmers in each event at the A-standard entry time, and 1 at the B-standard):

Men

| Athlete | Event | Heat | | Semifinal | | Final | |
| Athlete | Event | Time | Rank | Time | Rank | Time | Rank |
|---|---|---|---|---|---|---|---|
| Chaoili Aonzoudine | 50 m butterfly | 31.09 | 75 | did not advance | | | |
| Chaoili Aonzoudine | 100 m butterfly | 1:21.89 | 73 | did not advance | | | |
| Athoumane Soilihi | 50 m freestyle | 27.34 | 97 | did not advance | | | |
| Athoumane Soilihi | 100 m freestyle | 1:03.09 | 113 | did not advance | | | |

Women

| Athlete | Event | Heat | | Semifinal | | Final | |
| Athlete | Event | Time | Rank | Time | Rank | Time | Rank |
|---|---|---|---|---|---|---|---|
| Mohamed Nazlati | 50 m freestyle | 37.64 | 107 | did not advance | | | |
| Mohamed Nazlati | 50 m breaststroke | 45.75 | 67 | did not advance | | | |
