= Ethiopia at the 2019 World Aquatics Championships =

- Flag of Ethiopia
- World Aquatics code: ETH
- National federation: Ethiopian Swimming Federation

in Gwangju, South Korea
- Competitors: 4 in 1 sport
- Medals: Gold 0 Silver 0 Bronze 0 Total 0

World Aquatics Championships appearances
- 2009; 2011; 2013; 2015; 2017; 2019; 2022; 2023; 2024; 2025

Ethiopia competed at the 2019 World Aquatics Championships in Gwangju, South Korea from 12 to 28 July.

== Swimming ==
Ethiopia entered four swimmers.

Men

Athlete	Event	Heat		Semifinal		Final	
Athlete	Event	Time	Rank	Time	Rank	Time	Rank
Achala Gekabel	50 m butterfly	29.59	84	Did not advance			
Achala Gekabel	100 m butterfly	1:06.40	77	Did not advance			
Abdelmalik Muktar	50 m freestyle	27.39	=116	Did not advance			
Abdelmalik Muktar	50 m breaststroke	35.17	72	Did not advance			

Women

Athlete	Event	Heat		Semifinal		Final	
Athlete	Event	Time	Rank	Time	Rank	Time	Rank
Rahel Gebresilassie	50 m freestyle	32.36	92	Did not advance			
Rahel Gebresilassie	50 m butterfly	36.37	63	Did not advance			
Lina Selo	100 m freestyle	1:14.88	90	Did not advance			
Lina Selo	50 m breaststroke	DNS		Did not advance			
