= Swimming at the 2019 World Aquatics Championships – Women's 50 metre backstroke =

Women's 50 metre backstroke at the 2019 World Aquatics Championships
- Venue: Nambu University Municipal Aquatics Center
- Location: Gwangju, South Korea
- Dates: 24 July (heats and semifinals); 25 July (final)
- Competitors: 48 from 43 nations
- Winning time: 27.33

Medalists
gold medal	Olivia Smoliga	United States
silver medal	Etiene Medeiros	Brazil
bronze medal	Daria Vaskina	Russia

The Women's 50 metre backstroke competition at the 2019 World Championships was held on 24 and 25 July 2019.

== Records ==
Prior to the competition, the existing world and championship records were as follows.

World record	Liu Xiang (CHN)	26.98	Jakarta, Indonesia	21 August 2018
Competition record	Zhao Jing (CHN)	27.06	Rome, Italy	30 July 2009

== Results ==
=== Heats ===
The heats were held on 24 July at 10:03.

Rank	Heat	Lane	Name	Nationality	Time	Notes
1	5	4	Fu Yuanhui	China	27.70	Q
2	5	5	Etiene Medeiros	Brazil	27.85	Q
3	5	7	Kira Toussaint	Netherlands	27.86	Q
4	4	4	Georgia Davies	Great Britain	27.92	Q
5	5	8	Julie Kepp Jensen	Denmark	27.95	Q
6	3	5	Olivia Smoliga	United States	27.96	Q
7	5	1	Simona Kubová	Czech Republic	28.00	Q
8	3	4	Anastasia Fesikova	Russia	28.02	Q
9	4	5	Mimosa Jallow	Finland	28.04	Q
10	3	3	Alicja Tchórz	Poland	28.14	Q
11	4	6	Kathleen Baker	United States	28.17	Q
12	3	6	Maaike de Waard	Netherlands	28.19	Q
12	5	3	Chen Jie	China	28.19	Q
14	4	3	Kaylee McKeown	Australia	28.23	Q
15	5	2	Caroline Pilhatsch	Austria	28.28	Q
16	5	6	Daria Vaskina	Russia	28.29	Q
17	4	2	Silvia Scalia	Italy	28.30	
18	3	7	Stephanie Au	Hong Kong	28.31	
19	4	1	Minna Atherton	Australia	28.32	
20	3	2	Natsumi Sakai	Japan	28.41	
21	3	1	Theodora Drakou	Greece	28.48	
22	3	8	Im Da-sol	South Korea	28.50	
23	5	0	Ingeborg Løyning	Norway	28.67	
24	3	0	Katalin Burián	Hungary	28.84	
25	4	0	Karolina Hájková	Slovakia	29.04	
26	3	9	Louise Hansson	Sweden	29.12	
27	4	9	Diana Nazarova	Kazakhstan	29.51	
28	5	9	Ekaterina Avramova	Turkey	29.61	
29	2	4	Eygló Ósk Gústafsdóttir	Iceland	29.82	
30	2	6	Marie Khoury	Lebanon	30.39	NR
31	2	3	Mónica Ramírez	Andorra	30.53	
32	1	9	Nimia Murua	Panama	30.77	
33	2	5	Maria Arrua	Paraguay	30.86	
34	2	7	Xiomara Getrouw	Suriname	31.42	
35	1	1	Sophia Diagne	Senegal	31.98	
36	2	2	Kimberly Ince	Grenada	32.27	
37	2	8	Cheang Weng Lam	Macau	33.01	
38	2	0	Colleen Furgeson	Marshall Islands	33.28	
39	2	1	Robyn Young	Eswatini	33.54	
40	1	8	Nooran Ba-Matraf	Yemen	33.99	
41	1	2	Jennifer Harding-Marlin	Saint Kitts and Nevis	34.08	
42	1	7	Aika Watanabe	Northern Mariana Islands	35.04	
43	2	9	Noelani Day	Tonga	35.17	
44	1	4	Aishath Sausan	Maldives	35.41	NR
45	1	6	Nafissath Radji	Benin	36.01	
46	1	0	Ekaterina Bordachyova	Tajikistan	37.95	
47	1	3	Tayamika Chang'anamuno	Malawi	38.49	
48	1	5	Shivani Bhatt	Tanzania	38.96	
	4	7	Mie Nielsen	Denmark	DNS	
	4	8	Alexandra Touretski	Switzerland	DNS	

=== Semifinals ===
The semifinals were held on 24 July at 20:37.

==== Semifinal 1 ====
Rank	Lane	Name	Nationality	Time	Notes
1	4	Etiene Medeiros	Brazil	27.69	Q
2	5	Georgia Davies	Great Britain	27.72	Q
3	1	Kaylee McKeown	Australia	27.73	Q
4	3	Olivia Smoliga	United States	27.76	Q
5	8	Daria Vaskina	Russia	27.79	Q
6	6	Anastasia Fesikova	Russia	28.01	
7	7	Maaike de Waard	Netherlands	28.04	
8	2	Alicja Tchórz	Poland	28.18	

==== Semifinal 2 ====
Rank	Lane	Name	Nationality	Time	Notes
1	7	Kathleen Baker	United States	27.62	Q
2	8	Caroline Pilhatsch	Austria	27.77	Q, NR
3	5	Kira Toussaint	Netherlands	27.78	Q
4	4	Fu Yuanhui	China	27.84	
5	6	Simona Kubová	Czech Republic	27.91	
6	1	Chen Jie	China	28.07	
7	2	Mimosa Jallow	Finland	28.10	
8	3	Julie Kepp Jensen	Denmark	28.24	

=== Final ===
The final was held on 25 July at 20:37.

Rank	Lane	Name	Nationality	Time	Notes
1st place, gold medalist(s)	2	Olivia Smoliga	United States	27.33	NR
2nd place, silver medalist(s)	5	Etiene Medeiros	Brazil	27.44	
3rd place, bronze medalist(s)	8	Daria Vaskina	Russia	27.51	
4	3	Georgia Davies	Great Britain	27.65	
4	6	Kaylee McKeown	Australia	27.65	
6	4	Kathleen Baker	United States	27.69	
7	7	Caroline Pilhatsch	Austria	27.78	
8	1	Kira Toussaint	Netherlands	27.85	
