= Suriname at the 2024 World Aquatics Championships =

- Flag of Suriname
- FINA code: SUR
- National federation: Surinaamse Zwem Bond

in Doha, Qatar
- Competitors: 2 in 1 sport
- Medals: Gold 0 Silver 0 Bronze 0 Total 0

World Aquatics Championships appearances
- 1973; 1975; 1978; 1982; 1986; 1991; 1994; 1998; 2001; 2003; 2005; 2007; 2009; 2011; 2013; 2015; 2017; 2019; 2022; 2023; 2024

Suriname competed at the 2024 World Aquatics Championships in Doha, Qatar from 2 to 18 February.

== Competitors ==
The following is the list of competitors in the Championships.

Sport	Men	Women	Total
Swimming	2	0	2
Total	2	0	2

== Swimming ==
Suriname entered 2 swimmers.

Men

Athlete	Event	Heat		Semifinal		Final	
Athlete	Event	Time	Rank	Time	Rank	Time	Rank
Jeno Heyns	100 metre freestyle	55.13	85	Did not advance			
Jeno Heyns	100 metre butterfly	58.51	54	Did not advance			
Irvin Hoost	50 metre freestyle	24.23	65	Did not advance			
Irvin Hoost	50 metre butterfly	26.38	48	Did not advance			
