= Daria Vaskina =

Russian swimmer

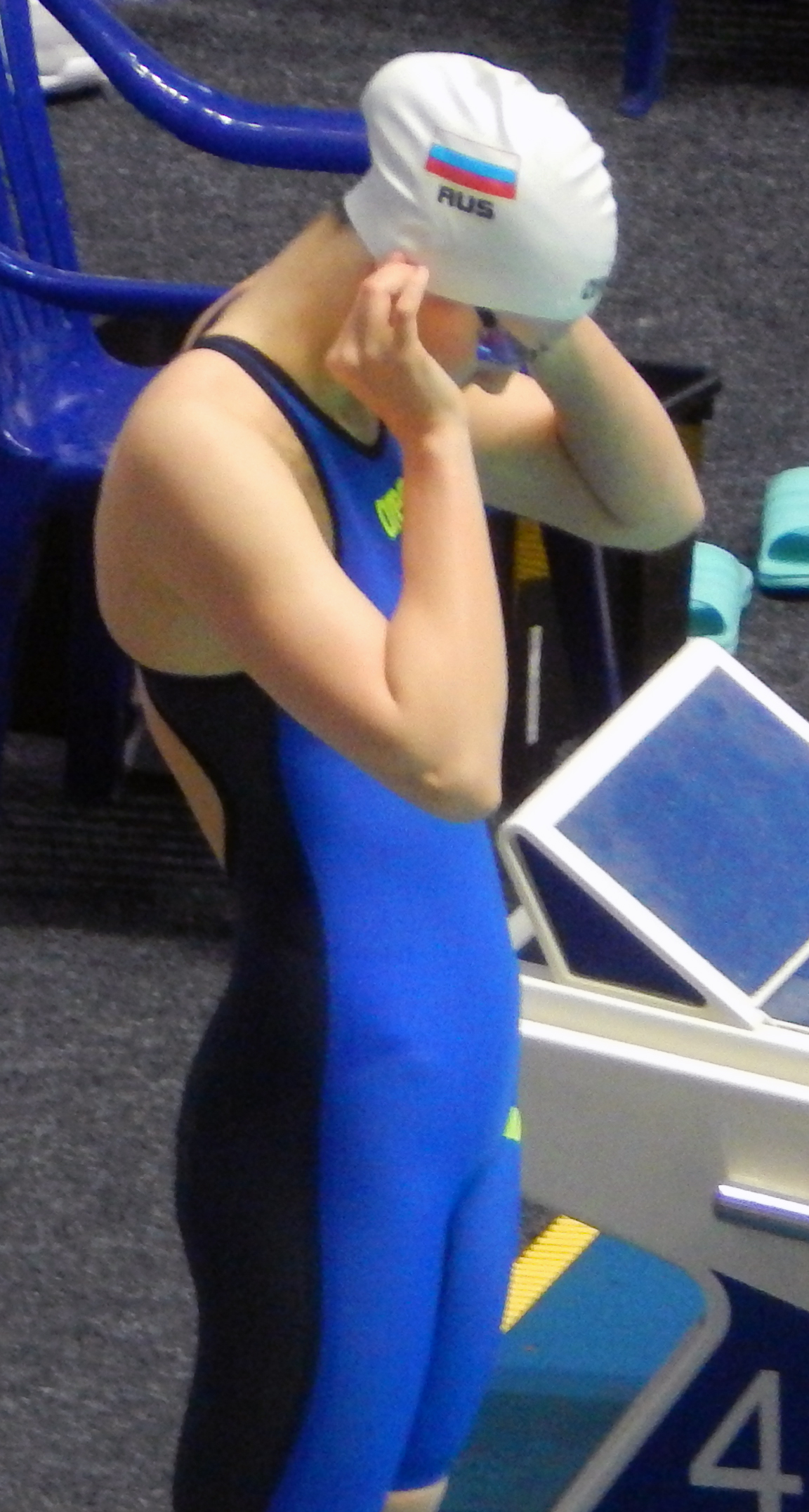
- Daria Vaskina in 2018

Personal information
- Full name: Daria Andreyevna Vaskina
- Nationality: Russian
- Born: 30 July 2002 (age 23) Moscow, Russia
- Height: 1.80 m (5 ft 11 in)

Sport
- Sport: Swimming
- Strokes: Backstroke
Medal record
World Championships (LC)
Bronze medal – third place	2019 Gwangju	50 m backstroke
Summer Youth Olympics
Gold medal – first place	2018 Buenos Aires	100 m backstroke
Gold medal – first place	2018 Buenos Aires	4×100 m freestyle
Gold medal – first place	2018 Buenos Aires	4×100 m mixed freestyle
Silver medal – second place	2018 Buenos Aires	50 m backstroke
Bronze medal – third place	2018 Buenos Aires	4×100 m medley

Daria Andreyevna Vaskina (Russian: Дарья Андреевна Васкина; born 30 July 2002) is a Russian swimmer. She competed in the women's 100 metre backstroke at the 2019 World Aquatics Championships.
