= Ethiopia at the 2013 World Aquatics Championships =

- Flag of Ethiopia
- FINA code: ETH
- National federation: Ethiopian Swimming Federation

in Barcelona, Spain
- Competitors: 3 in 1 sports
- Medals: Gold 0 Silver 0 Bronze 0 Total 0

World Aquatics Championships appearances
- 2009; 2011; 2013; 2015; 2017; 2019; 2022; 2023; 2024

Ethiopia competed at the 2013 World Aquatics Championships in Barcelona, Spain from 19 July to 4 August 2013.

== Swimming ==
Ethiopian swimmers achieved qualifying standards in the following events (up to a maximum of 2 swimmers in each event at the A-standard entry time, and 1 at the B-standard):

Men

Athlete	Event	Heat		Semifinal		Final	
Athlete	Event	Time	Rank	Time	Rank	Time	Rank
Esayas Ayele	50 m butterfly	30.79	76	did not advance			
Robel Habte	50 m freestyle	27.48	88	did not advance			
Robel Habte	100 m freestyle	1:02.57	84	did not advance			

Women

Athlete	Event	Heat		Semifinal		Final	
Athlete	Event	Time	Rank	Time	Rank	Time	Rank
Meseret Amare	50 m backstroke	DNS		did not advance			
