= Benin at the 2013 World Aquatics Championships =

- Flag of Benin
- FINA code: BEN
- National federation: Benin Swimming Federation

in Barcelona, Spain
- Competitors: 3 in 1 sports
- Medals Ranked -th: Gold 0 Silver 0 Bronze 0 Total 0

World Aquatics Championships appearances
- 1973; 1975; 1978; 1982; 1986; 1991; 1994; 1998; 2001; 2003; 2005; 2007; 2009; 2011; 2013; 2015; 2017; 2019; 2022; 2023; 2024

Benin competed at the 2013 World Aquatics Championships in Barcelona, Spain from 19 July to 4 August 2013.

== Swimming ==
Beninese swimmers achieved qualifying standards in the following events (up to a maximum of 2 swimmers in each event at the A-standard entry time, and 1 at the B-standard):

Men

Athlete	Event	Heat		Semifinal		Final	
Athlete	Event	Time	Rank	Time	Rank	Time	Rank
Awoussou Ablam	100 m breaststroke	1:32.77	77	did not advance			
Awoussou Ablam	50 m backstroke	35.85	49	did not advance			
Wilfried Tevoedjre	50 m freestyle	29.00	98	did not advance			
Wilfried Tevoedjre	100 m freestyle	1:07.42	86	did not advance			

Women

Athlete	Event	Heat		Semifinal		Final	
Athlete	Event	Time	Rank	Time	Rank	Time	Rank
Charmel Sogbadji	50 m freestyle	42.13	83	did not advance			
Charmel Sogbadji	100 m breaststroke	1:43.41	=60	did not advance			
