= Ethiopia at the 2023 World Aquatics Championships =

- Flag of Ethiopia
- FINA code: ETH
- National federation: Ethiopian Swimming Federation

in Fukuoka, Japan
- Competitors: 2 in 1 sport

World Aquatics Championships appearances
- 2009; 2011; 2013; 2015; 2017; 2019; 2022; 2023; 2024

Ethiopia is set to compete at the 2023 World Aquatics Championships in Fukuoka, Japan from 14 to 30 July.

== Swimming ==
Ethiopia entered 2 swimmers.

Men

| Athlete | Event | Heat | | Semifinal | | Final | |
| Athlete | Event | Time | Rank | Time | Rank | Time | Rank |
|---|---|---|---|---|---|---|---|
| Tilahun Malede | 50 metre freestyle | 28.77 | 114 | Did not advance| | | | |
| Tilahun Malede | 50 metre butterfly | 29.80 | 83 | Did not advance | | | |

Women

| Athlete | Event | Heat | | Semifinal | | Final | |
| Athlete | Event | Time | Rank | Time | Rank | Time | Rank |
|---|---|---|---|---|---|---|---|
| Lina Selo | 50 metre freestyle | 33.93 | 97 | Did not advance | | | |
| Lina Selo | 50 metre butterfly | 37.68 | 61 | Did not advance | | | |
