= Swimming at the 2018 Summer Youth Olympics – Girls' 50 metre backstroke =

Girls' 50 metre backstroke at the 2018 Summer Youth Olympics
- Venue: Natatorium
- Dates: 10 October (heats, semifinals); 11 October (final)
- Competitors: 39 from 36 nations
- Winning time: 28.28

Medalists
gold medal	Kaylee McKeown	Australia
silver medal	Daria Vaskina	Russia
bronze medal	Lila Touili	France

The girls' 50 metre backstroke event at the 2018 Summer Youth Olympics took place on 10 and 11 October at the Natatorium in Buenos Aires, Argentina.

== Results ==
=== Heats ===
The heats were started on 10 October at 10:14.

Rank	Heat	Lane	Name	Nationality	Time	Notes
1	4	4	Kaylee McKeown	Australia	28.17	Q
2	4	2	Rhyan White	United States	28.46	Q
2	5	4	Daria Vaskina	Russia	28.46	Q
4	5	3	Tamara Frías	Spain	28.89	Q
5	4	3	Madison Broad	Canada	28.95	Q
6	4	5	Lila Touili	France	29.07	Q
7	3	2	Arina Baikova	Latvia	29.25	Q
8	3	4	Peng Xuwei	China	29.32	Q
9	3	5	Fernanda de Goeij	Brazil	29.33	Q
10	5	5	Anastasiya Shkurdai	Belarus	29.35	Q, WD
11	2	5	Natalie Kan	Hong Kong	29.39	Q
11	3	3	Laura Ilyés	Hungary	29.39	Q
13	4	6	Alena Semizhon	Belarus	29.43	Q
14	4	1	Taydé Sansores	Mexico	29.51	Q
15	4	7	Diana Nazarova	Kazakhstan	29.72	Q
16	3	6	Ingeborg Løyning	Norway	29.73	Q
17	5	2	Malene Rypestøl	Norway	29.77	Q
18	2	6	Maria Pessanha	Brazil	29.83	
19	3	1	Kalia Antoniou	Cyprus	29.91	
20	5	7	Chen Szu-chi	Chinese Taipei	30.02	
21	2	2	Kristýna Štemberová	Czech Republic	30.04	
22	2	4	Margaret Markvardt	Estonia	30.14	
23	5	6	Mariella Venter	South Africa	30.15	
24	3	7	Tatiana Salcuțan	Moldova	30.21	
25	5	1	Nea-Amanda Heinola	Finland	30.27	
26	3	8	Gina Galloway	New Zealand	30.31	
27	4	8	Lucija Šulenta	Croatia	30.50	
28	2	3	Madelyn Moore	Bermuda	30.59	
29	2	7	Sara Junevik	Sweden	30.64	
30	2	1	Mia Ann Phiri	Zambia	30.89	
31	5	8	Karolina Jurczyk	Poland	31.00	
32	1	7	Carolina Cermelli	Panama	31.18	
33	2	8	Aaliyah Palestrini	Seychelles	32.11	
34	1	1	Robyn Young	Eswatini	32.34	
35	1	4	Ashley Chai	Brunei	33.19	
36	1	5	Roylin Akiwo	Palau	34.84	
37	1	3	Tayamika Chang'anamuno	Malawi	37.61	
38	1	2	Nafissath Radji	Benin	37.89	
39	1	6	Kayla Hepler	Marshall Islands	37.98	

=== Semifinals ===
The semifinals were started on 10 October at 18:05.

Rank	Heat	Lane	Name	Nationality	Time	Notes
1	2	4	Kaylee McKeown	Australia	28.14	Q
2	2	5	Daria Vaskina	Russia	28.24	Q
3	1	4	Rhyan White	United States	28.62	Q
4	2	3	Madison Broad	Canada	28.78	Q
5	1	3	Lila Touili	France	28.80	Q
6	1	1	Diana Nazarova	Kazakhstan	28.86	Q
7	2	2	Fernanda de Goeij	Brazil	28.91	Q
8	1	5	Tamara Frías	Spain	28.93	Q
9	1	2	Natalie Kan	Hong Kong	29.09	
10	1	7	Alena Semizhon	Belarus	29.23	
11	2	1	Taydé Sansores	Mexico	29.29	
12	1	6	Peng Xuwei	China	29.49	
13	2	8	Ingeborg Løyning	Norway	29.76	
14	1	8	Malene Rypestøl	Norway	29.81	
15	2	6	Arina Baikova	Latvia	29.86	
16	2	7	Laura Ilyés	Hungary	30.05	

=== Final ===
The final was held on 11 October at 18:53.

Rank	Lane	Name	Nationality	Time	Notes
1st place, gold medalist(s)	4	Kaylee McKeown	Australia	28.28	
2nd place, silver medalist(s)	5	Daria Vaskina	Russia	28.38	
3rd place, bronze medalist(s)	2	Lila Touili	France	28.78	
4	3	Rhyan White	United States	28.86	
5	1	Fernanda de Goeij	Brazil	28.91	
6	8	Tamara Frías	Spain	29.01	
7	6	Madison Broad	Canada	29.12	
8	7	Diana Nazarova	Kazakhstan	29.55	
