= Comoros at the 2022 World Aquatics Championships =

- Flag of the Comoros
- FINA code: COM
- National federation: Comoros Swimming Federation

in Budapest, Hungary
- Competitors: 2 in 1 sport
- Medals: Gold 0 Silver 0 Bronze 0 Total 0

World Aquatics Championships appearances
- 2007; 2009; 2011; 2013; 2015; 2017; 2019; 2022; 2023; 2024

Comoros competed at the 2022 World Aquatics Championships in Budapest, Hungary from 18 June to 3 July.

== Swimming ==
Athlete	Event	Heat		Semifinal		Final	
Athlete	Event	Time	Rank	Time	Rank	Time	Rank
Ali Barouf	Men's 50 m freestyle	32.52	90	did not advance			
Maesha Saadi	Women's 50 metre freestyle	35.26	81	did not advance			
