= Benin at the 2011 World Aquatics Championships =

- Flag of Benin
- FINA code: BEN
- National federation: Benin Swimming Federation

in Shanghai, China
- Competitors: 3 in 1 sports
- Medals Ranked -th: Gold 0 Silver 0 Bronze 0 Total 0

World Aquatics Championships appearances
- 1973; 1975; 1978; 1982; 1986; 1991; 1994; 1998; 2001; 2003; 2005; 2007; 2009; 2011; 2013; 2015; 2017; 2019; 2022; 2023; 2024

Benin competed at the 2011 World Aquatics Championships in Shanghai, China between 16 and 31 July 2011.

== Swimming ==
Benin qualified 3 swimmers.

Men

Athlete	Event	Heats		Semifinals		Final	
Athlete	Event	Time	Rank	Time	Rank	Time	Rank
Godonou Wilfrid Tevoedjre	50 m freestyle	31.49	108	did not advance			
Godonou Wilfrid Tevoedjre	100 m freestyle	1:14.08	104	did not advance			
Thierry Videgni	50 m backstroke	42.95	39	did not advance			
Thierry Videgni	100 m breaststroke	1:34.34	81	did not advance			

Women

Athlete	Event	Heats		Semifinals		Final	
Athlete	Event	Time	Rank	Time	Rank	Time	Rank
Angele Gbenou	50 m freestyle	38.40	83	did not advance			
Angele Gbenou	50 m breaststroke	46.90	33	did not advance			
