= Comoros at the 2019 World Aquatics Championships =

- Flag of the Comoros
- FINA code: COM
- National federation: Comoros Swimming Federation

in Gwangju, South Korea
- Competitors: 2 in 1 sport
- Medals: Gold 0 Silver 0 Bronze 0 Total 0

World Aquatics Championships appearances
- 2007; 2009; 2011; 2013; 2015; 2017; 2019; 2022; 2023; 2024

Comoros competed at the 2019 World Aquatics Championships in Gwangju, South Korea from 12 to 28 July.

== Swimming ==
Comoros entered two swimmers.

Men

| Athlete | Event | Heat | | Semifinal | | Final | |
| Athlete | Event | Time | Rank | Time | Rank | Time | Rank |
|---|---|---|---|---|---|---|---|
| Mohamed Ibrahim | 50 m freestyle | 29.17 | 123 | did not advance | | | |
| Mohamed Ibrahim | 50 m butterfly | 32.53 | 92 | did not advance | | | |
| Hakim Youssouf | 100 m freestyle | 1:05.48 | 117 | did not advance | | | |
| Hakim Youssouf | 50 m breaststroke | 38.65 | 76 | did not advance | | | |
