= Ethiopia at the 2022 World Aquatics Championships =

- Flag of Ethiopia
- FINA code: ETH
- National federation: Ethiopian Swimming Federation

in Budapest, Hungary
- Competitors: 2 in 1 sport
- Medals: Gold 0 Silver 0 Bronze 0 Total 0

World Aquatics Championships appearances
- 2009; 2011; 2013; 2015; 2017; 2019; 2022; 2023; 2024

Ethiopia competed at the 2022 World Aquatics Championships in Budapest, Hungary from 18 June to 3 July.

== Swimming ==
Athlete	Event	Heat		Semifinal		Final	
Athlete	Event	Time	Rank	Time	Rank	Time	Rank
Tilahun Ayal Malede	Men's 50 m freestyle	DSQ		did not advance			
Tilahun Ayal Malede	Men's 50 m butterfly	30.50	69	did not advance			
Brhane Demeke Amare	Women's 50 m freestyle	34.92	80	did not advance			
Brhane Demeke Amare	Women's 50 m breaststroke	44.30	54	did not advance			
