= Comoros at the 2023 World Aquatics Championships =

- Flag of the Comoros
- FINA code: COM
- National federation: Comoros Swimming Federation

in Fukuoka, Japan
- Competitors: 2 in 1 sport
- Medals: Gold 0 Silver 0 Bronze 0 Total 0

World Aquatics Championships appearances
- 2007; 2009; 2011; 2013; 2015; 2017; 2019; 2022; 2023; 2024

Comoros is set to compete at the 2023 World Aquatics Championships in Fukuoka, Japan from 14 to 30 July.

== Swimming ==
Comoros entered 2 swimmers.

Men

Athlete	Event	Heat		Semifinal		Final	
Athlete	Event	Time	Rank	Time	Rank	Time	Rank
Omar Mchangama	50 metre freestyle	31.50	117	Did not advance			

Women

Athlete	Event	Heat		Semifinal		Final	
Athlete	Event	Time	Rank	Time	Rank	Time	Rank
Maesha Saadi	50 metre freestyle	33.05	94	Did not advance			
