= Comoros at the 2024 World Aquatics Championships =

- Flag of the Comoros
- FINA code: COM
- National federation: Comoros Swimming Federation

in Doha, Qatar
- Competitors: 2 in 1 sport
- Medals: Gold 0 Silver 0 Bronze 0 Total 0

World Aquatics Championships appearances
- 2007; 2009; 2011; 2013; 2015; 2017; 2019; 2022; 2023; 2024

Comoros competed at the 2024 World Aquatics Championships in Doha, Qatar from 2 to 18 February.

== Competitors ==
The following is the list of competitors in the Championships.

Sport	Men	Women	Total
Swimming	1	1	2
Total	1	1	2

== Swimming ==
Comoros entered 2 swimmers.

Men

Athlete	Event	Heat		Semifinal		Final	
Athlete	Event	Time	Rank	Time	Rank	Time	Rank
Ibrahim Mohamed	50 metre freestyle	30.43	114	Did not advance			
Ibrahim Mohamed	50 metre butterfly	34.35	67	Did not advance			

Women

Athlete	Event	Heat		Semifinal		Final	
Athlete	Event	Time	Rank	Time	Rank	Time	Rank
Kamila Ibrahim	50 metre freestyle	33.36	101	Did not advance			
Kamila Ibrahim	50 metre backstroke	40.21	53	Did not advance			
