= Benin at the 2019 World Aquatics Championships =

- Flag of Benin
- FINA code: BEN
- National federation: Fédération Béninoise de Natation

in Gwangju, South Korea
- Competitors: 3 in 1 sport
- Medals: Gold 0 Silver 0 Bronze 0 Total 0

World Aquatics Championships appearances
- 1973; 1975; 1978; 1982; 1986; 1991; 1994; 1998; 2001; 2003; 2005; 2007; 2009; 2011; 2013; 2015; 2017; 2019; 2022; 2023; 2024

Benin competed at the 2019 World Aquatics Championships in Gwangju, South Korea from 12 to 28 July.

== Swimming ==
Benin entered three swimmers.

Men

Athlete	Event	Heat		Semifinal		Final	
Athlete	Event	Time	Rank	Time	Rank	Time	Rank
Gildas Koumondji	50 m breaststroke	34.90	71	did not advance			
Gildas Koumondji	100 m breaststroke	1:26.57	87	did not advance			
Jefferson Kpanou	50 m freestyle	26.18	111	did not advance			
Jefferson Kpanou	50 m butterfly	28.72	80	did not advance			

Women

Athlete	Event	Heat		Semifinal		Final	
Athlete	Event	Time	Rank	Time	Rank	Time	Rank
Nafissath Radji	50 m freestyle	30.85	85	did not advance			
Nafissath Radji	50 m backstroke	36.01	45	did not advance			
