= Laraïba Seibou =

Beninese swimmer

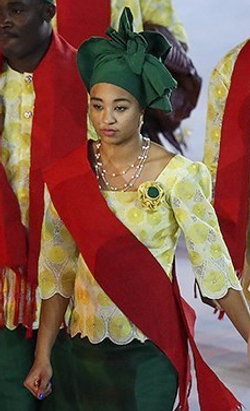
- Seibou at the 2016 Olympics

Personal information
- Nationality: Beninese
- Born: 6 December 2000 (age 25)
- Height: 173 cm (5 ft 8 in)
- Weight: 63 kg (139 lb)

Sport
- Sport: Swimming

Laraïba Seibou (born 6 December 2000) is a Beninese swimmer. At 15 years old, she was chosen as one of Benin's wild card entries for the 2016 Summer Olympics and competed in the 50 metre freestyle. Although she came second in her heat with a time of 33.01 seconds, her recorded time meant that she did not advance to the semi-finals.

== Early life ==
Laraiba Gnon Cessy Seibou was born on 6 December 2000 in Benin.

== 2016 Summer Olympics ==
At 15 years old, Seibou was named in the Benin contingent for the 2016 Summer Olympics in Rio de Janeiro, Brazil. She flew from New York to join the rest of the team on 3 August. Her travel had been delayed after she had been issued a ticket which stated she was a man, not a woman. This was still ahead of the officials in the delegation, who flew out to Rio three days after her. Out of the six athletes in the team, she was one of two women named; the other being Noélie Yarigo.

Since her personal best for the 50 meter freestyle was 37.67 seconds, outside of the "B" qualifying time of 26.17 seconds, she competed in Rio on the basis of a wild card universal spot awarded to Benin. She competed in the women's 50 metre freestyle on 12 August, in the second heat. She finished second with a time of 33.01 seconds, behind the winner, Anastasiya Tyurina of Tajikistan (31.15 seconds). None of the times recorded by any of the swimmers in the heat were fast enough to qualify them for the following round, as qualification was based on times recorded and not the final positions. As such, all the swimmers for the semi-finals were from the ninth, tenth, eleventh and twelfth heats.
