= Marc Dansou =

Beninese swimmer (born 1983)

Personal information
- Nationality: Beninese
- Born: 3 November 1983 (age 41); Paris, France

Sport
- Sport: Swimming

Marc Pascal Pierre Dansou (born 3 November 1983) is a Beninese swimmer. He competed in the men's 50 metre freestyle at the 2020 Summer Olympics.

Dansou, a native of Paris, began representing Benin in swimming in 2003. He represented Benin at the 2004 African Swimming Championships, where he reached the finals. After 2007, he took a break from competition and returned to working in finance, a decision which he attributed to conflicts with the Benin Swimming Federation. He began his attempt to return to swimming in 2018, and with the support of the Benin National Olympic and Sports Committee in his disputes with the Benin Swimming Federation, was able to secure his place on the national team for the 2020 Summer Olympics. His time of 24.99 seconds in his heat did not qualify him for the semifinals. He finished in 53rd place overall.
