= Alexis Kpadi =

Beninese swimmer (born 2005)

Alexis Kpadé
Personal information
- Full name: Alexis Michel Roger Dodji Kpadé
- National team: Benin
- Born: November 11, 2005 (age 20)

Sport
- Sport: Swimming

Alexis Michel Roger Dodji Kpadé (born 11 November 2005) is a France-based swimmer who represents Benin at international level. He was selected to compete at the 2024 Paris Olympics.

== Career ==
He is a member of Hac Seine Métropole Natation in Le Havre, France, and held the Beninese national record at the age of 18 years-old in the 200m backstroke at 2:06.66. He participated at the 2024 World Swimming Championships in Doha.

He competed in the 100 metres backstroke at the 2024 Olympic Games in Paris. He finished second in his heat of the men's 100-meter backstroke with a time of 57.61 seconds. Despite beating his personal best of 58.03 seconds, Alexis Kpadé finished 42nd overall after six heats, and did not reach the semifinals.

He competed for Benin at the 2025 World Aquatics Championships where he set a national record of 57.50 seconds for the 100m backstroke.
