= Evita Leter =

Surinamese swimmer (born 1995)

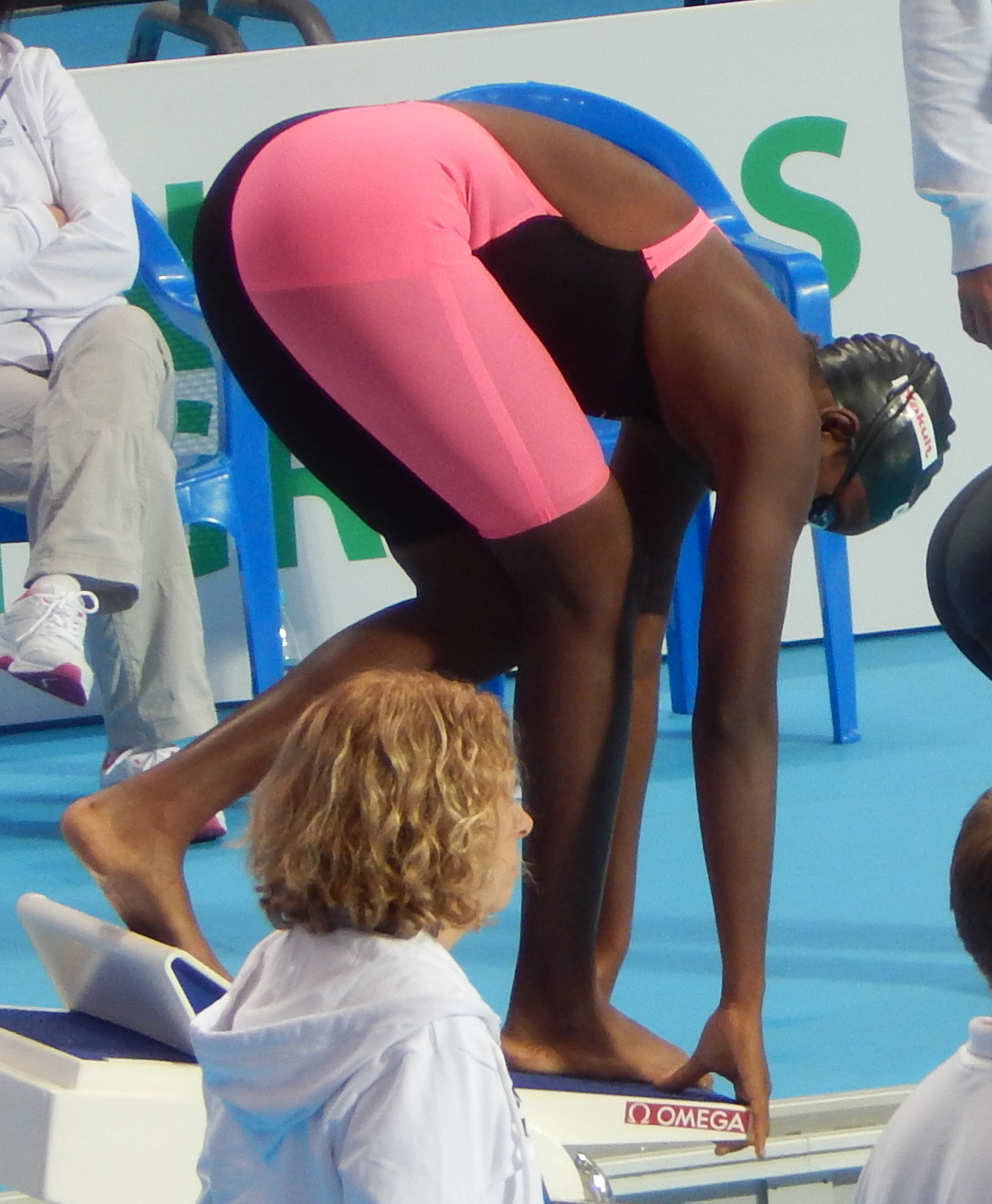
- Leter in 2015

Personal information
- Born: July 5, 1995 (age 31) Paramaribo, Suriname

Sport
- Sport: Swimming

Evita Elisabeth Leter (born July 5, 1995) is a Surinamese swimmer. She competed at the 2016 Summer Olympics in the women's 100 metre breaststroke event; her time of 1:14.96 in the heats did not qualify her for the semifinals. She hails from Paramaribo. In 2019, she represented Suriname at the 2019 World Aquatics Championships held in Gwangju, South Korea.
