= Ionnah Eliane Douillet =

Beninese swimmer (born 2007)

Personal information
- National team: Benin
- Born: November 28, 2007 (age 18)

Sport
- Sport: Swimming

Ionnah Eliane Douillet (born 28 November 2007) is a swimmer from Benin. She competed at the 2024 Paris Olympics and the 2024 World Swimming Championships.

== Career ==
She won four gold medals at the African Junior Championships zone 2, 2023 in Ghana. At that championships she also won a bronze medal in the team in the 4X100 mixed medley relay. She was a two-time finalist at the 2023 African Junior Championships, in Mauritius. She participated in the 2024 World Swimming Championships in Doha. She was a finalist in the 4X100 mixed medley relay at the African all-category championships in 2024 in Angola.

She was selected for the 2024 Summer Olympics in Paris where she competed in the 50m Freestyle and was the youngest member of the Beninese team at the age of 17 years-old. In her heat, she finished 5th with a time of 27.64 seconds. In the overall standings, she finished 45th out of 79 athletes.

== Personal life ==
Her father is French and her mother is Beninese. She trained as a teenager at the ES Massy Swimming club in Massy, Essonne.
