= Xiomara Getrouw =

Surinamese swimmer

Personal information
- Nationality: Surinamese
- Born: 22 October 1994 (age 31) Paramaribo, Suriname

Sport
- Sport: Swimming
- Strokes: Backstroke

Xiomara Getrouw (born 22 October 1994) is a Surinamese swimmer. She is her country's record holder in the 50 m backstroke and the 50 m butterfly.

== Early life and education ==
Getrouw attended AlphaMax Academy in Suriname, Monroe Community College, in Rochester, New York, and St Andrew's University in North Carolina. She has a bachelor's degree in sports management.

== Swimming ==
In 2021, Getrouw won the women's 38th Staatsolie swimming marathon.

In 2014, she competed at the 2014 NJCAA Swimming and Diving Championships in the 200 m medley in Fort Pierce, Florida.

She set her country's national record for the 50 m backstroke in 2017 in Amsterdam in a time of 29:62. The same year, she represented Suriname in the women's 50 m backstroke event at the 2017 World Aquatics Championships.

She is also the national record holder in the 50 m butterfly.
