= Lina Alemayehu Selo =

Ethiopian swimmer

Lina Alemayehu Selo (born 8 October 2000 ) is an Ethiopian swimmer. Selo set an Ethiopian record in the women's 50m freestyle at the 2023 African Games which were delayed to 2024. She competed for Ethiopia at the 2024 Summer Olympics, where she was one of the country's flag bearers at the opening ceremonies. In the women's 50m freestyle, she placed 4th in her heat and was ranked 68th overall.
