= Nafissath Radji =

Beninese swimmer (born 2002)

Personal information
- Full name: Nafissath Abèkè Radji
- Nickname: Nafi
- National team: Benin
- Born: 2 August 2002 (age 23) Porto-Novo, Benin

Sport
- Sport: Swimming
- Club: Club des Nageurs de Dakar et Goree

Nafissath Radji (born 2 August 2002 in Porto-Novo) is a Beninese swimmer.

She competed in the girls' 50 metre backstroke event at the 2018 Summer Youth Olympics held in Buenos Aires, Argentina. She did not qualify to compete in the semi-finals.

In 2019, she represented Benin at the World Aquatics Championships held in Gwangju, South Korea. She competed in the women's 50 metre freestyle event. She did not advance to compete in the semi-finals. She also competed in the women's 50 metre backstroke event. In that same year, she also represented Benin at the 2019 African Games held in Rabat, Morocco.

In 2021, she competed in the women's 50 metre freestyle event at the 2020 Summer Olympics held in Tokyo, Japan. Her time of 29.99 seconds in her heat did not qualify for the semifinals.

She represented Benin at the 2022 World Aquatics Championships held in Budapest, Hungary. She competed in the women's 50 metre freestyle and women's 100 metre freestyle events.

Olympic Games
Preceded by Yémi Apithy	Flag bearer for Benin; 2020 Tokyo with Privel Hinkati	Succeeded by Valentin Houinato; Noélie Yarigo
