= Benin Swimming Federation =

Sports governing body in Benin

CANA
- Founded: 2000
- FINA affiliation: 2001
- CANA affiliation: xxxx
- President: Abdon Deguenon

The Benin Swimming Federation (French: Fédération Béninoise de Natation), is the national governing body for the sport of swimming in Benin.

In 2010, Abdon Déguénon was elected President of the Federation. He was re-elected in 2014, and again in March 2018, when he beat his challenger Leopold Zinsou by 32 votes to 30.
