= Comoros Swimming Federation =

Governing body of swimming in Comoros

CANA
- FINA affiliation: 1998
- CANA affiliation: xxxx
- President: Mohamed Farahane

The Comoros Swimming Federation is the national governing body for the sport of swimming in Comoros.
