= Ethiopia at the 2011 World Aquatics Championships =

Sporting event delegation

Flag of Ethiopia

Ethiopia competed at the 2011 World Aquatics Championships in Shanghai, China between July 16 and 31, 2011.

== Swimming ==
Ethiopia qualified 3 swimmers.

Men

Athlete	Event	Heats		Semifinals		Final	
Athlete	Event	Time	Rank	Time	Rank	Time	Rank
Mulualem Girma	Men's 50m Freestyle	28.81	99	did not advance			
Mulualem Girma	Men's 50m Backstroke	33.85	36	did not advance			
Fiseha Hailu	Men's 50m Butterfly	29.58	47	did not advance			
Fiseha Hailu	Men's 100m Butterfly	DSQ		did not advance			

Women

Athlete	Event	Heats		Semifinals		Final	
Athlete	Event	Time	Rank	Time	Rank	Time	Rank
Gebremedhin Yanet Seyoum	Women's 50m Freestyle	33.17	73	did not advance			
Gebremedhin Yanet Seyoum	Women's 50m Backstroke	38.06	56	did not advance			
