= Flag of Suriname =

Suriname
- Use: National flag and ensign
- Proportion: 2:3
- Adopted: 25 November 1975; 50 years ago
- Design: A horizontal triband of green (top and bottom) and red (double width) with large white border with the large yellow five-pointed star centered on the red band.
- Designed by: Jack Pinas

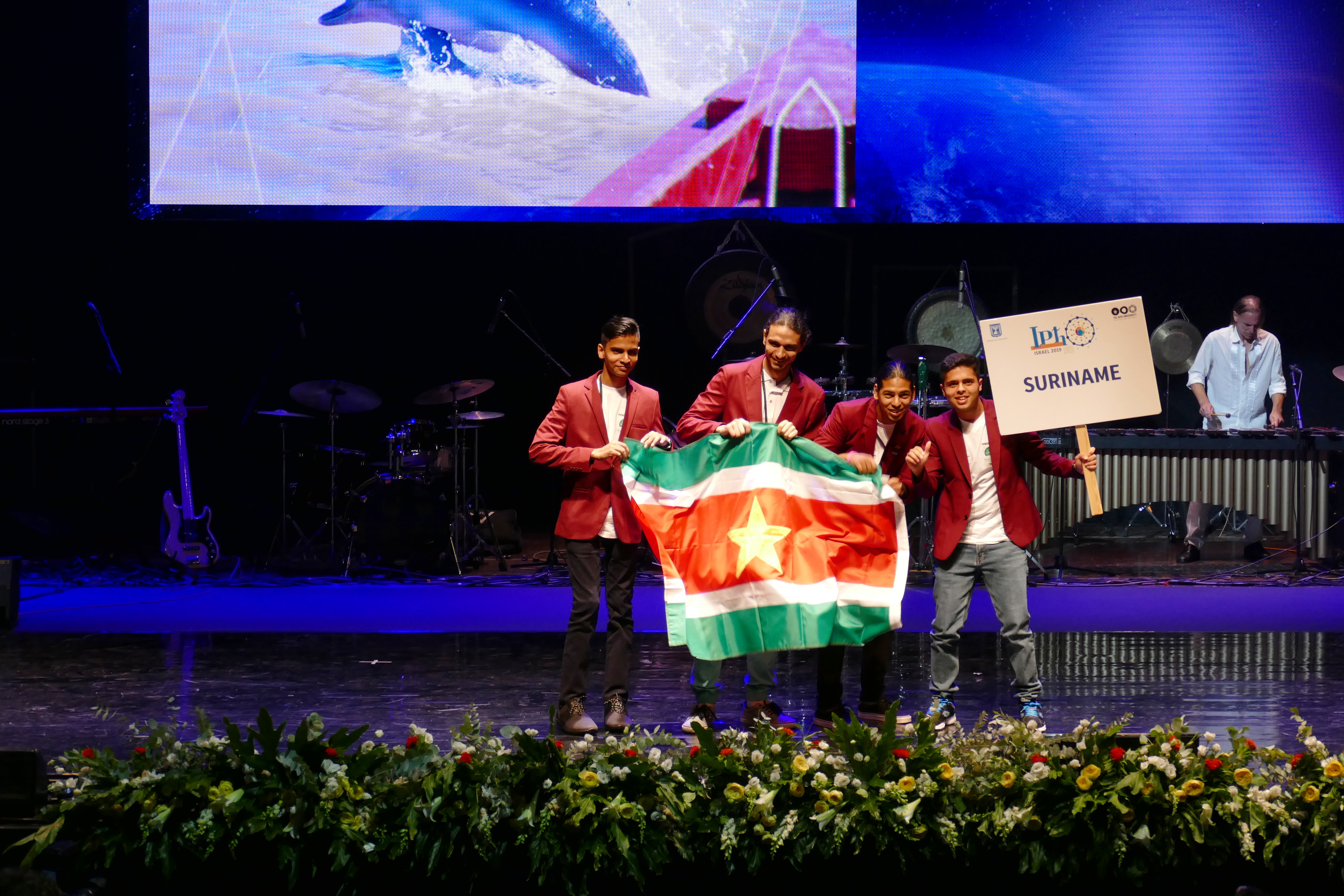
Surinamese team with flag at the 2019 International Physics Olympiad in Israel

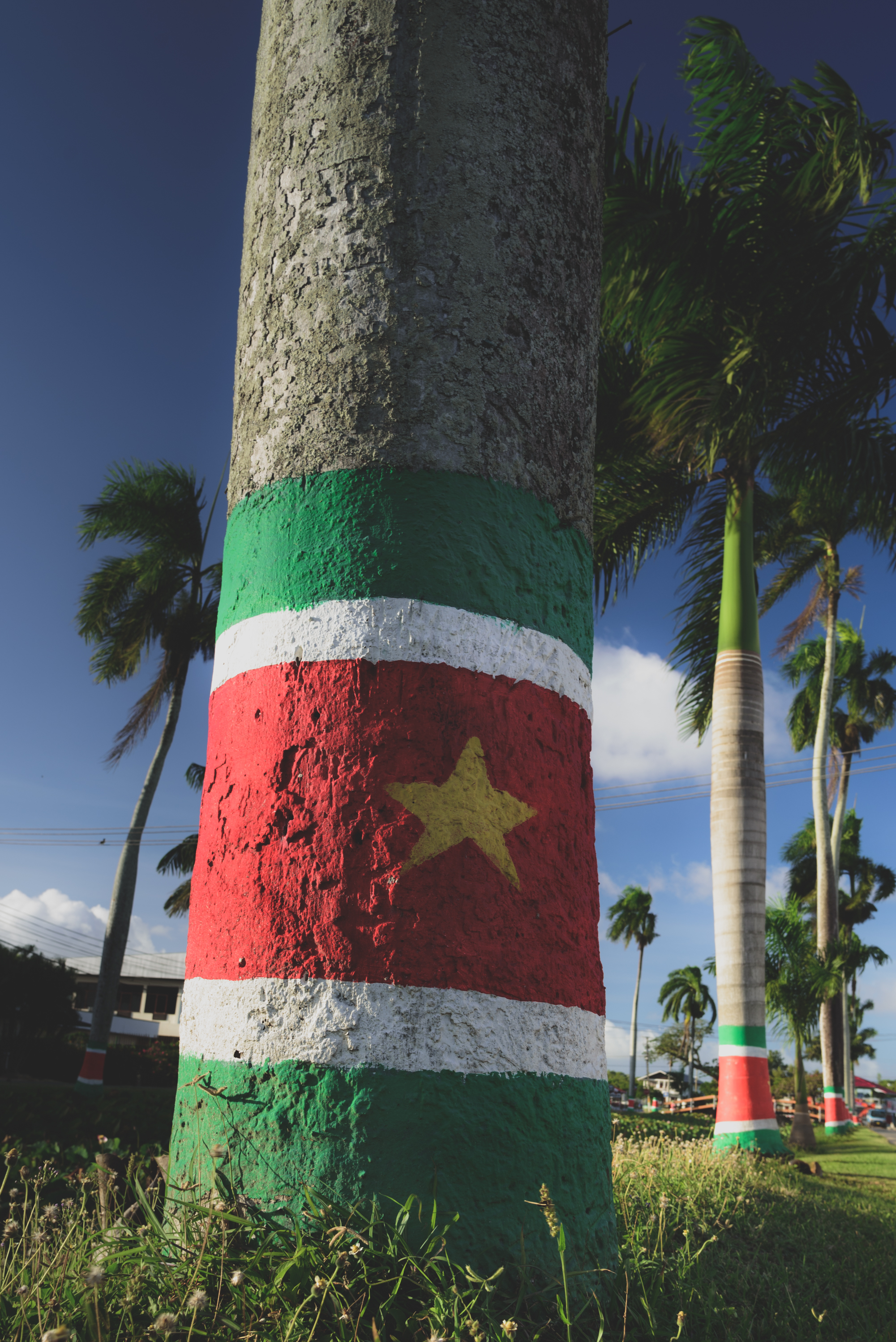
Surinamese flag painted on a tree

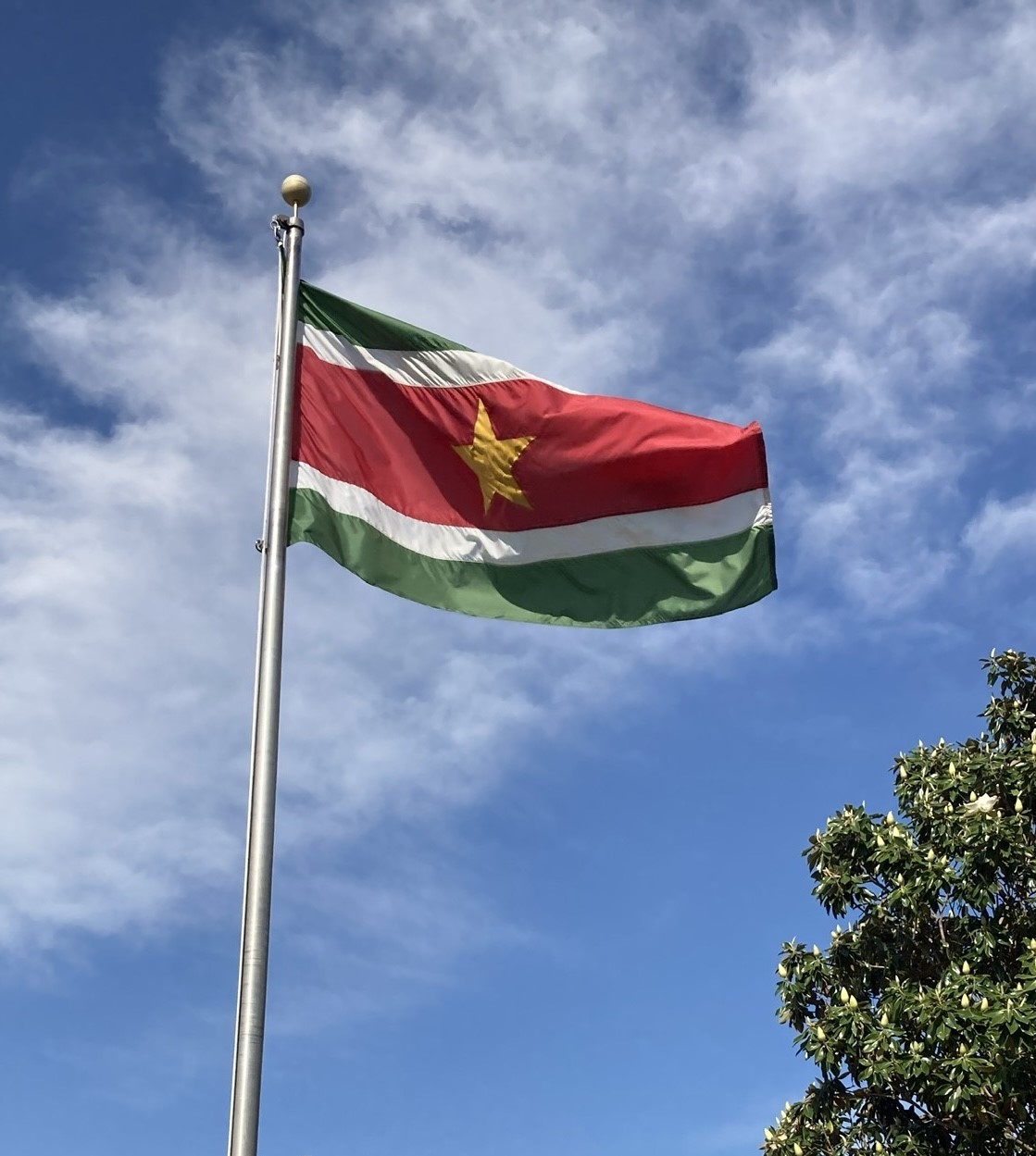
Flag of Suriname on a pole

The national flag of Suriname was legally adopted on 25 November 1975, upon the independence of Suriname from the Netherlands.

The flag was designed as a result of a national competition. It was raised for the first time on the Independence Day of the Republic of Suriname. There is a legal requirement for vessels to raise the flag of Suriname when visiting another country to reduce miscommunication between other countries.

== Description ==
The flag of Suriname is composed of five horizontal bands of green (top, double width), white, red (quadruple width), white, and green (double width) with a large, yellow, five-pointed star in the centre.

The colour red represents progress, white represents freedom and justice and the green represents the fertility of the land. The yellow star represents unity and a golden future.

Scheme	Green	White	Red	Yellow
Hexadecimal	#377E3F	#FFFFFF	#B40A2D	#ECC81D
RGB	55, 126, 63	255, 255, 255	180, 10, 45	236, 200, 29
Pantone	356C	n/a	186C	116C
NCS	3060 G 10 Y	n/a	1080 Y 90 R	0580 Y 10 R

Flag construction sheet

== History ==
The flag was designed as a result of a national competition, with the winning design being accepted by the Surinamese parliament in 1975. Jack Pinas, art teacher and graphic designer, won the design competition. However, some changes on Pinas' design were made.

The green horizontal band on both the top and bottom of the flag represents the richness of the country's agricultural lands; the white horizontal band represents freedom and independence and red symbolizes progress and hope. The star on centre of the flag reflects the sacrifices endured for the Surinamese independence as well as the unity of the country and a bright future. The Surinamese political parties are indicated by the different colors that are used in the flag.

== Historical flags ==
=== Flag used in 1815–1959 ===
After the establishment of the Kingdom of the Netherlands in 1815, the Dutch tricolor was used in the Dutch colony of Suriname. There was talk of a design for a colony flag with the Dutch tricolor with the coat of arms of Suriname in the white area, but in practice this was not used.

The governor's flag before 1959 was the flag of the Netherlands with white circles in the top left corner. The same governor's flag was also used by the governors of the Netherlands Antilles and Netherlands New Guinea respectively.

=== First flag, 1959–1975 ===
After the signing of the Charter for the Kingdom of the Netherlands on 15 December 1954, the need arose for Suriname's own official flag, coat of arms and anthem.

The pre-independence flag was designed by Noni Lichtveld and was adopted in 1959. It consisted of five coloured stars connected by a black ellipse with a plain white background. The coloured stars represented the major ethnic groups that comprise the Surinamese population, being black (Africans), brown (Asian Indians), yellow (Javanese and Chinese), red (Amerindians), and white (Europeans). The ellipse represented the harmonious relationship among the groups.

This flag was also used as the governor's flag. However, the flag was criticized by the wider public for putting too much emphasis on the ethnic differences and therefore symbolizing less of the national unity of the Surinamese people. It was changed to the current flag in late 1975 after a nationwide contest.

Flag used until 1959

Proposed flag of the Dutch colony of Suriname

Governor's standard from 1920 to 1966

Standard of the governor, 1966–1975

Flag of Suriname between 1959 and 1975

The Flag of Suriname

Standard of the prime minister, 1975–1988

Presidential standard
