= Suriname at the 2011 World Aquatics Championships =

Sporting event delegation

Flag of Suriname

Suriname competed at the 2011 World Aquatics Championships in Shanghai, China between July 16 and 31, 2011.

== Swimming ==
Suriname qualified 3 swimmers.

Men

Athlete	Event	Heats		Semifinals		Final	
Athlete	Event	Time	Rank	Time	Rank	Time	Rank
Diguan Pigot	Men's 100m Breaststroke	1:06.00	67	did not advance			
Diguan Pigot	Men's 200m Breaststroke	2:27.21	51	did not advance			
Marcelino Richaards	Men's 50m Butterfly	25.36	33	did not advance			
Marcelino Richaards	Men's 100m Butterfly	56.51	48	did not advance			

Women

Athlete	Event	Heats		Semifinals		Final	
Athlete	Event	Time	Rank	Time	Rank	Time	Rank
Chinyere Pigot	Women's 50m Freestyle	26.19	32	did not advance			
Chinyere Pigot	Women's 100m Freestyle	57.34	41	did not advance			
