= Flag of the Comoros =

Union of the Comoros
- Use: National flag
- Proportion: 3:5
- Adopted: 23 December 2001; 24 years ago
- Design: Four horizontal stripes of yellow, white, red and blue (from top to bottom); with a green triangle based on the hoist side charged with a white crescent and four five-pointed stars
- Designed by: Suzanne Gauthier

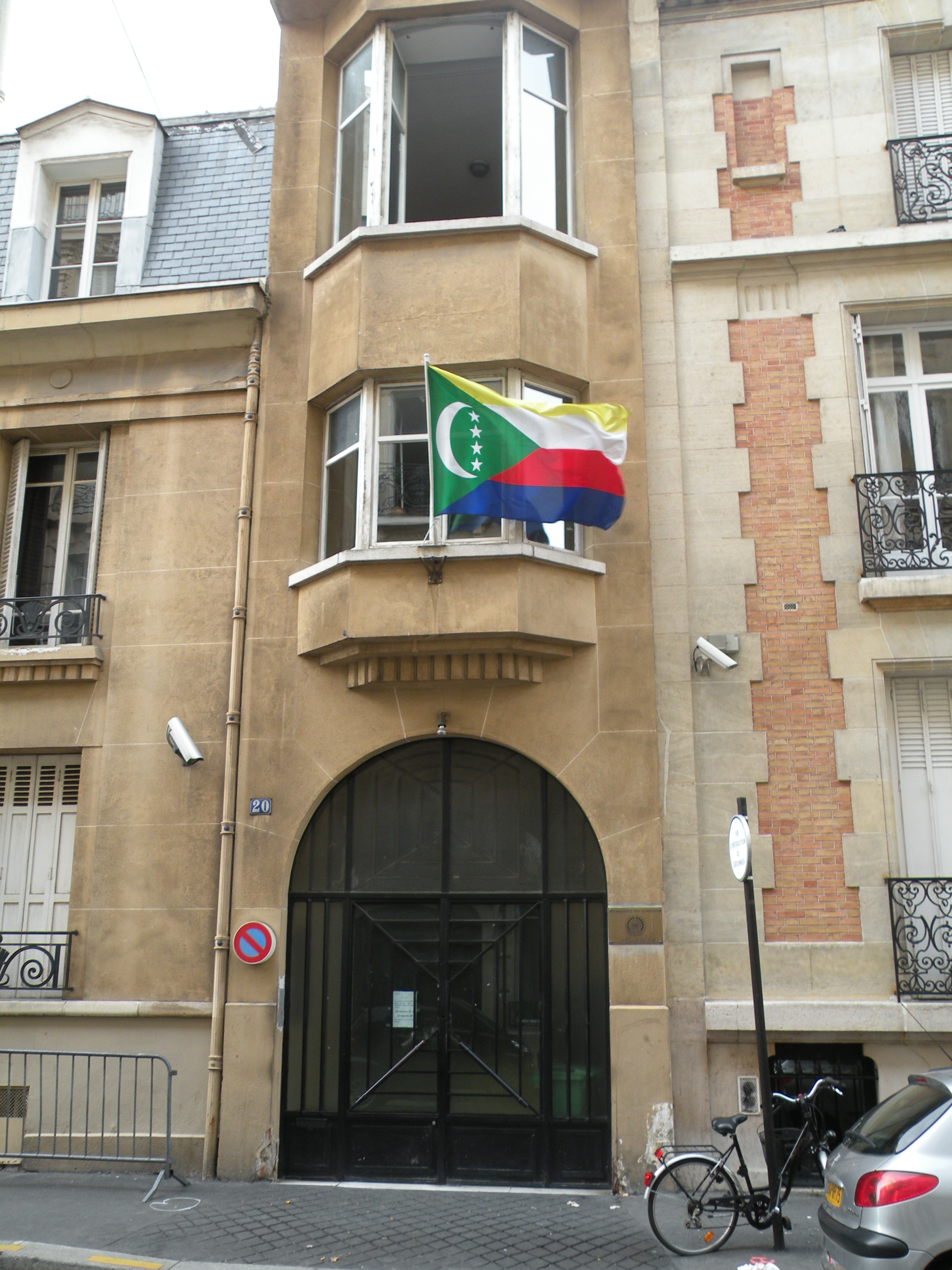
Flag at the Comorian embassy in Paris

The national flag of the Union of the Comoros was designed in 2001 and officially adopted on 23 December of that year. It continues to display the crescent and four stars, which is a motif that has been in use in various forms since 1975 during the independence movement.

== Colours ==
The colours are defined in the constitution as simply yellow, white, red, blue, and green. Nowhere does the government document any specific colour shades. For lack of any official standard, the colours used at the 2012 Olympics are shown in the table below.

Pantone colours used at the 2012 Olympics (with RGB approximations)
| Scheme | Green | Yellow | White | Red | Blue |
|---|---|---|---|---|---|
| Pantone | 355 | 109 | Safe | 32 | 293 |
| RGB | 0-150-57 | 255-209-0 | 255–255–255 | 239-51-64 | 0-61-165 |
| HTML | 009639 | FFD100 | FFFFFF | EF3340 | 003DA5 |

== Design ==
The design consists of a white crescent with four white five-pointed stars inside of a green triangle. The flag has four stripes, representing the four main islands of the nation: yellow for Mohéli, white for Mayotte (a French department claimed by the Comoros), red for Anjouan and blue for Grande Comore. The four stars on the flag also symbolize the four islands. The star and crescent, as well as the colour green on the flag, symbolise their main religion, Islam.

The stars' points are usually orientated upwards, as reflected in the model supplied when the flag was adopted, though legal documents concerning the flag do not specify the flag's orientation and there is a variant in which the stars point outwards and not up.

=== Construction sheet ===
Flag construction sheet

== History ==
The first official flag of Comoros was designed and adopted for local use in 1963 by Suzanne Gauthier, before Comoros gained its independence. It had a white crescent at upper hoist facing the fly, four stars in a diagonal, and used a 5:7 proportion with a green background. This design continued to be used after independence in 1975.

The flag changed in 1975 under Ali Soilih. The crescent was moved and the stars were rearranged into a diamond. Two thirds of the flag became red and symbolized the regime's socialist ideology. This flag shares the design to that of the Soviet-era and post-1995 Belarusian flags.

When Ahmed Abdallah returned to the presidency in 1978, the flag changed again. It returned to being completely green, with the crescent moving to the centre of the flag and the stars forming a line between its horns. Information about the proportions of this variant suggest either a 1:2, 2:3, or 3:5 ratio.

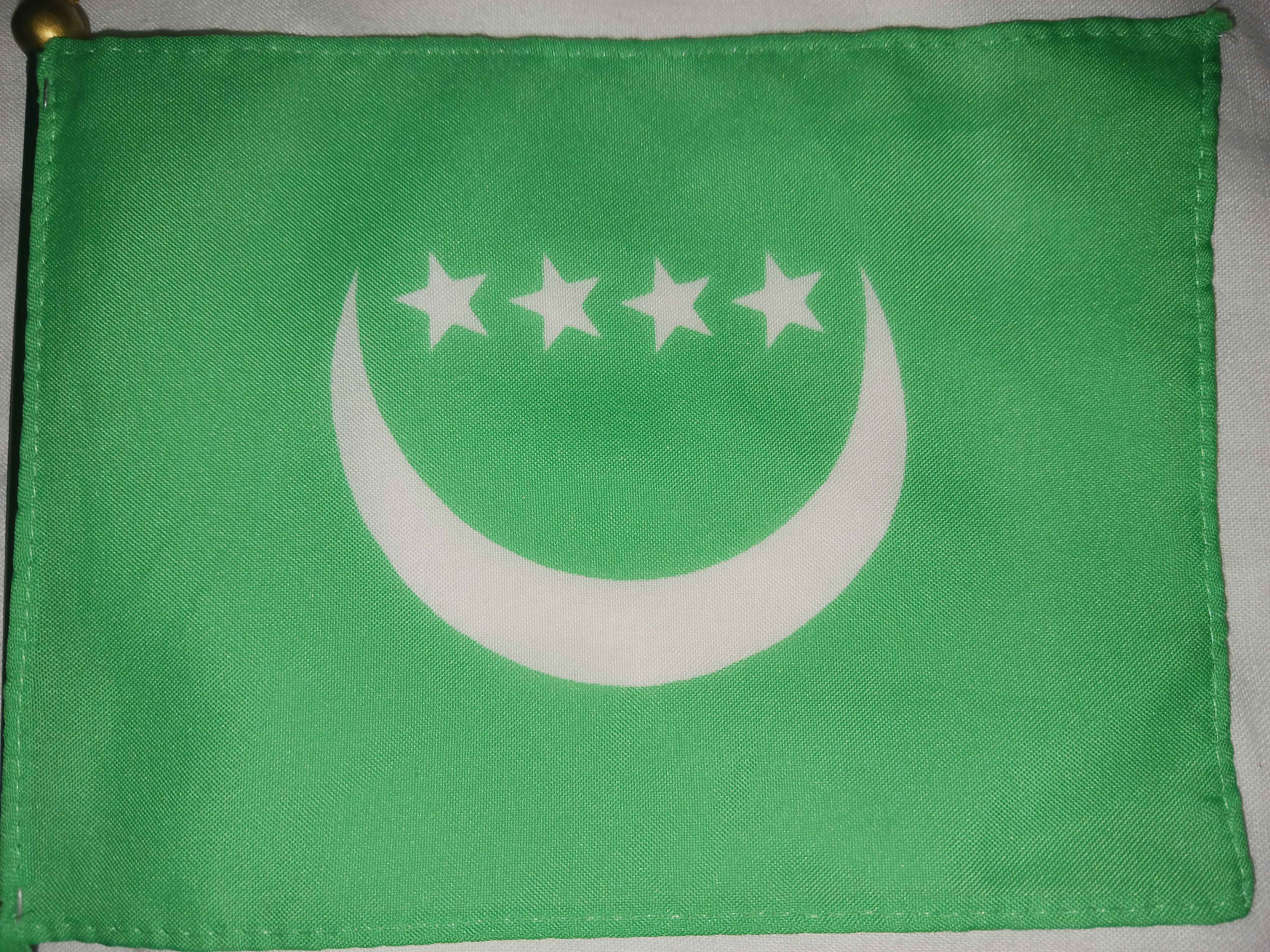
A 1992–1996 era vintage flag; this includes a variant that featured tilted stars.

With the adoption of a new constitution in 1992, the flag changed again, with the crescent and stars rotated to face upward rather than down and to the right.

The adoption of yet another constitution changed the flag again in 1996, rotating the flag to face the fly and adding a white inscription to the lower hoist and another to the upper fly. The inscriptions are written in Arabic calligraphy with the former reading "Muhammed" and the latter reading "Allah". The proportions of this flag were reported to be 7:5 (1.4:1). This flag was changed by referendum in 2001 to the modern one.

From 1996 until 2001, variants of the Comorian national flag supplied mainly by Annin Flagmakers contained the names "Muhammad" and "Allah" written out in longform. A similar flag using this design was flown outside the United Nations headquarters in 2000, which caught the attention of the Comorian ambassador, resulting in him rejecting the flag flown on display.

=== Former flags ===
Flag of France (1887–1963)

Flag of the State of the Comoros (1963–1975) from the pre-independence period before until 12 November 1975.

Flag of the State of the Comoros under the Ali Soilih Regime (November 12, 1975 – September 30, 1978)

Flag of the Federal Islamic Republic of the Comoros (October 1, 1978 – June 6, 1992)

Flag of the Federal Islamic Republic of the Comoros (June 7, 1992 – October 5, 1996)

The obverse side of the Flag of the Federal Islamic Republic of the Comoros (October 6, 1996 – December 22, 2001)

The reverse side of the Flag of the Federal Islamic Republic of the Comoros (October 6, 1996 – December 22, 2001)

Version of the 1996–2001 flag which was rejected by the Comorian Ambassador because of an erroneous form of text.

== Flags of individual islands ==
The flag of Anjouan

The flag of Grande Comore

The flag of Mohéli
