= Norway at the 2025 World Aquatics Championships =

- Flag of Norway
- World Aquatics code: NOR
- National federation: Norwegian Swimming Federation
- Website: www.svomming.no

in Singapore
- Competitors: 8 in 2 sports
- Medals: Gold 0 Silver 0 Bronze 0 Total 0

World Aquatics Championships appearances
- 1973; 1975; 1978; 1982; 1986; 1991; 1994; 1998; 2001; 2003; 2005; 2007; 2009; 2011; 2013; 2015; 2017; 2019; 2022; 2023; 2024; 2025

Norway competed at the 2025 World Aquatics Championships in Singapore from July 11 to August 3, 2025.

== Competitors ==
The following is the list of competitors in the Championships.

Sport	Men	Women	Total
Diving	1	1	2
Swimming	5	1	6
Total	6	2	8

== Diving ==
Men

Athlete	Event	Preliminaries		Semifinals		Final	
Athlete	Event	Points	Rank	Points	Rank	Points	Rank
Isak Børslien	3 m springboard	312.60	52	Did not advance			
Isak Børslien	10 m platform	364.50	22	Did not advance			

Women

Athlete	Event	Preliminaries		Semifinals		Final	
Athlete	Event	Points	Rank	Points	Rank	Points	Rank
Caroline Kupka	1 m springboard	214.90	31	—N/a		Did not advance	
Caroline Kupka	3 m springboard	224.95	36	Did not advance			

== Swimming ==
Norway entered 6 swimmers.

Men

Athlete	Event	Heat		Semi-final		Final	
Athlete	Event	Time	Rank	Time	Rank	Time	Rank
Jørgen Scheie Bråthen	50 m breaststroke	27.48	27	Did not advance			
Jørgen Scheie Bråthen	100 m breaststroke	1:01.29	34	Did not advance			
Bjørnar Laskerud	50 m freestyle	22.48	41	Did not advance			
Markus Lie	50 m backstroke	25.76	43	Did not advance			
Sander Kiær Sørensen	100 m freestyle	48.65 NR	24	Did not advance			
Sander Kiær Sørensen	200 m freestyle	1:46.63	14 Q	1:45.78 NR	9	Did not advance	
Sander Kiær Sørensen; Markus Lie; Jakob Harlem; Bjørnar Laskerud	4 × 100 m freestyle relay	3:16.66	17	—N/a		Did not advance	
Markus Lie; Jørgen Scheie Bråthen; Sander Kiær Sørensen; Bjoernar Laskerud	4 × 100 m medley relay	Did not start		—N/a		Did not advance	

Women

Athlete	Event	Heat		Semi-final		Final	
Athlete	Event	Time	Rank	Time	Rank	Time	Rank
Silje Slyngstadli	50 m breaststroke	30.80; 30.48 NR	17 S/off; 1	Did not advance			
Silje Slyngstadli	100 m breaststroke	1:08.31	29	Did not advance			
