= List of Nordic records in swimming =

This is a list of the Nordic records in swimming. These are the fastest times ever swum by a swimmer representing one of the Nordic countries:

- Denmark
- Estonia
- Finland
- Iceland
- Latvia
- Lithuania
- Norway
- Sweden
- and the associated territory, Faroe Islands.

As such, they are a sub-European, regional record.

The swimming federations/associations of Denmark, Norway and Sweden each produce listings of these Nordic records. This listing is based on a combination of these separate listings.

- Danish Swimming Federation records page
- Norwegian Swimming Federation records and statistics website

== Long course (50 m) ==
=== Men ===
Event	Time		Name	Nationality	Date	Meet	Location	Ref
50 m freestyle	21.45	sf	Stefan Nystrand	Sweden	31 Jul 2009	World Championships	Rome, Italy	
100 m freestyle	47.37		Stefan Nystrand	Sweden	30 Jul 2009	World Championships	Rome, Italy	
200 m freestyle	1:44.96	sf	Danas Rapšys	Lithuania	12 February 2024	World Championships	Doha, Qatar	
200 m freestyle	1:44.38	not ratified	Danas Rapšys	Lithuania	17 August 2019	World Cup	Singapore, Singapore	
400 m freestyle	3:44.40		Mads Glæsner	Denmark	26 Jul 2009	World Championships	Rome, Italy	
800 m freestyle	7:41.28		Henrik Christiansen	Norway	24 July 2019	World Championships	Gwangju, South Korea	
1500 m freestyle	14:45.35		Henrik Christiansen	Norway	28 July 2019	World Championships	Gwangju, South Korea	
50 m backstroke	24.68		Mantas Kaušpėdas	Lithuania	3 July 2024	European Junior Championships	Vilnius, Lithuania	
50 m backstroke	24.55	h, #	Robert Falborg Pedersen	Denmark	13 August 2026	European Championships	Paris, France	
100 m backstroke	53.99	#	Robert Falborg Pedersen	Denmark	19 April 2026	Danish Open	Bellahøj, Denmark	
100 m backstroke	53.61	r, #	Robert Falborg Pedersen	Denmark	16 August 2026	European Championships	Paris, France	
200 m backstroke	1:58.37		Örn Arnarson	Iceland	27 July 2001	World Championships	Fukuoka, Japan	
50 m breaststroke	27.02	sf	Johannes Skagius	Sweden	25 July 2017	World Championships	Budapest, Hungary	
100 m breaststroke	58.71		Alexander Dale Oen	Norway	25 July 2011	World Championships	Shanghai, China	
200 m breaststroke	2:07.13		Matti Mattsson	Finland	29 July 2021	Olympic Games	Tokyo, Japan	
50 m butterfly	22.93		Jakob Andkjær	Denmark	27 Jul 2009	World Championships	Rome, Italy	
100 m butterfly	51.50		Casper Puggaard	Denmark	14 July 2024	Danish Championships	Herning, Denmark	
200 m butterfly	1:54.22	sf	Kregor Zirk	Estonia	30 July 2024	Olympic Games	Paris, France	
200m individual medley	1:57.64	h	Tomoe Hvas	Norway	28 July 2021	Olympic Games	Tokyo, Japan	
400m individual medley	4:13.29		Jani Sievinen	Finland	8 September 1994	World Championships	Rome, Italy	
4×50m freestyle relay	1:30.97		Oscar Ekström (23.19); Alexander Nyström (22.19); Christoffer Carlsen (22.63); Gustav Åberg Lejdström (22.94)	Sweden	24 July 2014	Portuguese Open Championships	Oeiras, Portugal	
4×100m freestyle relay	3:11.92		Petter Stymne (49.17); Lars Frölander (48.02); Stefan Nystrand (47.25); Jonas Persson (47.48)	Sweden	11 Aug 2008	Olympic Games	Beijing, China	
4×200m freestyle relay	7:08.04		Tomas Navikonis (1:47.42); Tomas Lukminas (1:47.66); Kristupas Trepočka (1:48.06); Danas Rapšys (1:44.90)	Lithuania	17 June 2024	European Championships	Belgrade, Serbia	
4×50m medley relay	1:39.52 (Note: by official result source; 1:39.59 by general source, a typo)		Sergei Haukka (26.82); Lassi Ohtonen (28.00); Tuomas Pokkinen (23.69); Ari-Pekka Liukkonen (21.01)	(Finland) Cetus Espoo	22 March 2015	Grand Prix 3	Espoo, Finland	
4×100 m medley relay	3:35.30		Robert Falborg Pedersen (56.26); Elias Elsgaard (59.90); Casper Puggaard (50.87); Frederik Riedel Lentz (48.27)	Denmark	23 June 2024	European Championships	Belgrade, Serbia	
4×100 m medley relay	3:32.44	#	Robert Falborg Pedersen (53.61); Elias Elsgaard (59.35); Casper Puggaard (51.41); Oliver Søgaard-Andersen (48.07)	Denmark	16 August 2026	European Championships	Paris, France	

Legend: WR – World record; ER – European record; e – equalled existing record;
Records not set in finals: h – heat; sf – semifinal; r – relay 1st leg; rh – relay heat 1st leg; b – B final; † – en route to final mark; so – swim-off; tt – time trial

=== Women ===
Event	Time		Name	Nationality	Date	Meet	Location	Ref
50m freestyle	23.61	sf, WR	Sarah Sjöström	Sweden	29 July 2023	World Championships	Fukuoka, Japan	
100m freestyle	51.71	r, WR	Sarah Sjöström	Sweden	23 July 2017	World Championships	Budapest, Hungary	
200m freestyle	1:54.08		Sarah Sjöström	Sweden	9 August 2016	Olympic Games	Rio de Janeiro, Brazil	
400m freestyle	4:03.98		Lotte Friis	Denmark	29 July 2012	Olympic Games	London, Great Britain	
800m freestyle	8:15.92		Lotte Friis	Denmark	1 Aug 2009	World Championships	Rome, Italy	
1500m freestyle	15:38.88		Lotte Friis	Denmark	30 July 2013	World Championships	Barcelona, Spain	
50m backstroke	27.42	h	Mimosa Jallow	Finland	4 August 2018	European Championships	Glasgow, Great Britain	
100m backstroke	58.73		Mie Østergaard Nielsen	Denmark	19 May 2016	European Championships	London, Great Britain	
200m backstroke	2:08.84	sf	Eygló Ósk Gústafsdóttir	Iceland	11 August 2016	Olympic Games	Rio de Janeiro, Brazil	
50m breaststroke	29.16	WR	Rūta Meilutytė	Lithuania	30 July 2023	World Championships	Fukuoka, Japan	
100m breaststroke	1:04.62		Rūta Meilutytė	Lithuania	25 July 2023	World Championships	Fukuoka, Japan	
200m breaststroke	2:19.11	sf	Rikke Møller Pedersen	Denmark	1 August 2013	World Championships	Barcelona, Spain	
50m butterfly	24.43	WR	Sarah Sjöström	Sweden	5 July 2014	Swedish Championships	Borås, Sweden	
100m butterfly	55.48	WR	Sarah Sjöström	Sweden	7 August 2016	Olympic Games	Rio de Janeiro, Brazil	
200m butterfly	2:06.65	sf	Helena Rosendahl Bach	Denmark	31 July 2024	Olympic Games	Paris, France	
200m butterfly	2:06.14	#	Helena Rosendahl Bach	Denmark	16 August 2026	European Championships	Paris, France	
200m individual medley	2:09.73		Julie Hjorth-Hansen	Denmark	27 Jul 2009	World Championships	Rome, Italy	
400m individual medley	4:38.20	h	Julie Hjorth-Hansen	Denmark	2 Aug 2009	World Championships	Rome, Italy	
4×50m freestyle relay	1:41.81		Michelle Coleman (25.36); Magdalena Kuras (25.16); Ida Lindborg (25.42); Jessica Eriksson (25.87)	Sweden	24 July 2014	Portuguese Open Championships	Oeiras, Portugal	
4×100m freestyle relay	3:33.79		Sarah Sjöström (52.53); Michelle Coleman (52.98); Sara Junevik (54.41); Louise Hansson (53.87)	Sweden	27 July 2024	Olympic Games	Paris, France	
4×200m freestyle relay	7:50.24		Sarah Sjöström (1:54.31); Louise Hansson (1:57.72); Michelle Coleman (1:57.36); Ida Marko-Varga (2:00.85)	Sweden	6 August 2015	World Championships	Kazan, Russia	
4×50m medley relay	1:48.91		Ida Lindborg (28.95); Jennie Johansson (30.37); Sarah Sjöström (24.83); Michelle Coleman (24.76)	Sweden	26 July 2014	Portuguese Open Championships	Oeiras, Portugal	
4×100m medley relay	3:54.27		Michelle Coleman (59.75); Sophie Hansson (1:05.67); Louise Hansson (56.12); Sarah Sjöström (52.73)	Sweden	1 August 2021	Olympic Games	Tokyo, Japan	

Legend: WR – World record; ER – European record; e – equalled existing record;
Records not set in finals: h – heat; sf – semifinal; r – relay 1st leg; rh – relay heat 1st leg; b – B final; † – en route to final mark; so – swim-off; tt – time trial

=== Mixed relay ===
Event	Time		Name	Nationality	Date	Meet	Location	Ref
4×100m freestyle relay	3:23.40		Björn Seeliger (48.09); Robin Hanson (48.91); Sarah Sjöström (52.68); Louise Hansson (53.72)	Sweden	15 August 2022	European Championships	Rome, Italy	
4×200 m freestyle relay	7:32.10	#	Robin Hanson (1:46.71); Ludvig Bartolek (1:48.10); Elvira Mörtstrand (1:59.04); Sofia Åstedt (1:58.25)	Sweden	15 August 2026	European Championships	Paris, France	
4×100m medley relay	3:45.85	h	Hannah Rosvall (1:00.37); Erik Persson (1:00.12); Louise Hansson (57.05); Björn Seeliger (48.31)	Sweden	26 July 2023	World Championships	Fukuoka, Japan	

Legend: WR – World record; ER – European record; e – equalled existing record;
Records not set in finals: h – heat; so – swim-off

== Short course (25 m) ==
=== Men ===
Event	Time		Name	Nationality	Date	Meet	Location	Ref
50m freestyle	20.70		Stefan Nystrand	Sweden	15 Nov 2009	World Cup	Berlin, Germany	
100m freestyle	45.54		Stefan Nystrand	Sweden	10 Nov 2009	World Cup	Stockholm, Sweden	
200m freestyle	1:41.15		Danas Rapšys	Lithuania	9 December 2023	European Championships	Otopeni, Romania	
400m freestyle	3:36.64		Henrik Christiansen	Norway	11 December 2018	World Championships	Hangzhou, China	
800m freestyle	7:25.78		Henrik Christiansen	Norway	21 November 2020	ISL Test Event	Budapest, Hungary	
1500m freestyle	14:18.15		Henrik Christiansen	Norway	6 December 2019	European Championships	Glasgow, Great Britain	
50m backstroke	22.94		Robert Falborg Pedersen	Denmark	7 December 2025	European Championships	Lublin, Poland	
100m backstroke	50.67	sf	Markus Lie	Norway	13 December 2022	World Championships	Melbourne, Australia	
100m backstroke	50.67	=, #	Robert Falborg Pedersen	Denmark	3 October 2026	Øst Junior/Senior Kortbane	Bellahøj, Denmark	
200m backstroke	1:52.51		Anders Jensen	Denmark	18 Apr 2009	DM-H Svoemmeligaen	Kastrup, Denmark	
50m breaststroke	26.14	h, =	Tobias Bjerg	Denmark	4 December 2019	European Championships	Glasgow, Great Britain	
50m breaststroke	26.14	=	Anton Sveinn McKee	Iceland	4 December 2019	European Championships	Glasgow, Great Britain	
100m breaststroke	56.30		Anton Sveinn McKee	Iceland	25 October 2020	International Swimming League	Budapest, Hungary	
200m breaststroke	2:01.65		Anton Sveinn McKee	Iceland	1 November 2020	International Swimming League	Budapest, Hungary	
50m butterfly	22.56	sf	Nicholas Lia	Norway	5 November 2021	European Championships	Kazan, Russia	
100m butterfly	49.22	sf	Tomoe Hvas	Norway	2 November 2021	European Championships	Kazan, Russia	
200m butterfly	1:50.62		Tomoe Hvas	Norway	19 September 2021	International Swimming League	Naples, Italy	
100m individual medley	51.35		Tomoe Hvas	Norway	19 December 2021	World Championships	Abu Dhabi, United Arab Emirates	
200m individual medley	1:51.74		Tomoe Hvas	Norway	6 December 2019	European Championships	Glasgow, Great Britain	
400m individual medley	4:02.85		Tomoe Hvas	Norway	10 September 2021	International Swimming League	Naples, Italy	
4×50m freestyle relay	1:24.19		Petter Stymne (21.41); Marcus Piehl (20.97); Per Nylin (21.15); Stefan Nystrand (20.66)	Sweden	16 Dec 2007	European Championships	Debrecen, Hungary	
4×100m freestyle relay	3:09.53		Petter Stymne (48.41); Stefan Nystrand (45.29); Christoffer Vikström (48.61); Simon Sjödin (47.22)	Sweden	26 November 2009	Swedish Championships	Gothenburg, Sweden	
4×200m freestyle relay	6:54.49		Sebastian Ovesen (1:44.75); Daniel Skaaning (1:44.15); Frans Johannessen (1:43.70); Anders Lie Nielsen (1:41.89)	Denmark	9 December 2016	World Championships	Windsor, Canada	
4×50m medley relay	1:32.86	h	Robert Falborg Pedersen (23.40); Jonas Gaur (25.77); Rasmus Nickelsen (22.48); Malthe Lindeblad (21.21)	Denmark	7 December 2025	European Championships	Lublin, Poland	
4×100m medley relay	3:25.63		Markus Lie (51.00); André Grindheim (57.73); Tomoe Hvas (49.96); Nicholas Lia (46.94)	Norway	21 December 2021	World Championships	Abu Dhabi, United Arab Emirates	

Legend: WR – World record; ER – European record; e – equalled existing record;
Records not set in finals: h – heat; sf – semifinal; r – relay 1st leg; rh – relay heat 1st leg; b – B final; † – en route to final mark; so – swim-off; tt – time trial

=== Women ===
Event	Time		Name	Nationality	Date	Meet	Location	Ref
50m freestyle	23.00		Sarah Sjöström	Sweden	7 August 2017	World Cup	Berlin, Germany	
100m freestyle	50.58	ER	Sarah Sjöström	Sweden	11 August 2017	World Cup	Eindhoven, Netherlands	
200m freestyle	1:50.43	WR	Sarah Sjöström	Sweden	12 August 2017	World Cup	Eindhoven, Netherlands	
400m freestyle	3:58.02		Lotte Friis	Denmark	10 December 2011	European Championships	Szczecin, Poland	
800m freestyle	8:04.61		Lotte Friis	Denmark	14 Nov 2009	World Cup	Berlin, Germany	
1500m freestyle	15:28.65		Lotte Friis	Denmark	28 Nov 2009	Danish Club Championships	Birkerød, Denmark	
50m backstroke	25.83	sf	Louise Hansson	Sweden	19 December 2021	World Championships	Abu Dhabi, United Arab Emirates	
100m backstroke	55.20		Louise Hansson	Sweden	17 December 2021	World Championships	Abu Dhabi, United Arab Emirates	
200m backstroke	2:03.26		Michelle Coleman	Sweden	22 November 2014	Swedish Championships	Stockholm, Sweden	
50m breaststroke	28.37	sf, WR	Rūta Meilutytė	Lithuania	17 December 2022	World Championships	Melbourne, Australia	
100m breaststroke	1:02.77		Rūta Meilutytė	Lithuania	4 November 2022	World Cup	Indianapolis, United States	
200m breaststroke	2:15.21		Rikke Møller Pedersen	Denmark	13 December 2013	European Championships	Herning, Denmark	
50m butterfly	24.38	ER	Therese Alshammar	Sweden	22 Nov 2009	World Cup	Singapore	
100m butterfly	54.61	ER	Sarah Sjöström	Sweden	7 December 2014	World Championships	Doha, Qatar	
200m butterfly	2:03.55		Helena Bach	Denmark	7 December 2025	European Championships	Lublin, Poland	
100m individual medley	57.10		Sarah Sjöström	Sweden	2 August 2017	World Cup	Moscow, Russia	
200m individual medley	2:06.29		Louise Hansson	Sweden	4 November 2015	Swedish Championships	Helsingborg, Sweden	
400m individual medley	4:31.70		Stina Gardell	Sweden	13 December 2009	European Championships	Istanbul, Turkey	
4×50m freestyle relay	1:34.54		Sarah Sjöström (23.33); Michelle Coleman (23.38); Sara Junevik (24.02); Louise Hansson (23.81)	Sweden	21 December 2021	World Championships	Abu Dhabi, United Arab Emirates	
4×100m freestyle relay	3:28.80		Sarah Sjöström (51.45); Michelle Coleman (52.06); Sophie Hansson (53.41); Louise Hansson (51.88)	Sweden	16 December 2021	World Championships	Abu Dhabi, United Arab Emirates	
4×200m freestyle relay	7:41.91		Gabriella Fagundez (1:56.42); Sarah Sjöström (1:54.88); Ida Marko Varga (1:55.31); Petra Granlund (1:55.30)	Sweden	15 December 2010	World Championships	Dubai, United Arab Emirates	
4×50m medley relay	1:42.38	=WR	Louise Hansson (25.91); Sophie Hansson (29.07); Sarah Sjöström (23.96); Michelle Coleman (23.44)	Sweden	17 December 2021	World Championships	Abu Dhabi, United Arab Emirates	
4×100m medley relay	3:46.20	ER	Louise Hansson (56.25); Sophie Hansson (1:03.70); Sarah Sjöström (54.65); Michelle Coleman (51.60)	Sweden	21 December 2021	World Championships	Abu Dhabi, United Arab Emirates	

Legend: WR – World record; ER – European record; e – equalled existing record;
Records not set in finals: h – heat; sf – semifinal; r – relay 1st leg; rh – relay heat 1st leg; b – B final; † – en route to final mark; so – swim-off; tt – time trial

=== Mixed relay ===
Event	Time		Name	Nationality	Date	Meet	Location	Ref
4×50 m freestyle relay	1:29.45		Robert Falborg Pedersen (21.49); Frederik Moller (20.91); Julie Kepp Jensen (23.47); Martine Damborg (23.58)	Denmark	4 December 2025	European Championships	Lublin, Poland	
4×50 m medley relay	1:37.05		Louise Hansson (26.07); Daniel Kertes (25.48); Sara Junevik (24.49); Elias Persson (21.01)	Sweden	11 December 2024	World Championships	Budapest, Hungary	
4×100 m medley relay	3:38.15	h	Samuel Törnqvist (51.05); Daniel Kertes (57.95); Sara Junevik (56.48); Sofia Åstedt (52.67)	Sweden	14 December 2024	World Championships	Budapest, Hungary	

Legend: WR – World record; ER – European record; e – equalled existing record;
Records not set in finals: h – heat; so – swim-off

== See also ==
- List of European records in swimming
- List of Danish records in swimming
- List of Estonian records in swimming
- List of Finnish records in swimming
- List of Icelandic records in swimming
- List of Latvian records in swimming
- List of Lithuanian records in swimming
- List of Norwegian records in swimming
- List of Swedish records in swimming
- List of Faroese records in swimming
- Nordic Swimming Championships
