= Norway at the 2017 World Aquatics Championships =

- Flag of Norway
- FINA code: NOR
- National federation: Norges Svømmeforbund
- Website: www.svomming.no

in Budapest, Hungary
- Competitors: 3 in 1 sport
- Medals: Gold 0 Silver 0 Bronze 0 Total 0

World Aquatics Championships appearances
- 1973; 1975; 1978; 1982; 1986; 1991; 1994; 1998; 2001; 2003; 2005; 2007; 2009; 2011; 2013; 2015; 2017; 2019; 2022; 2023; 2024

Norway competed at the 2017 World Aquatics Championships in Budapest, Hungary from 14 July to 30 July.

== Swimming ==
Norwegian swimmers have achieved qualifying standards in the following events (up to a maximum of 2 swimmers in each event at the A-standard entry time, and 1 at the B-standard):

Athlete	Event	Heat		Semifinal		Final	
Athlete	Event	Time	Rank	Time	Rank	Time	Rank
Henrik Christiansen	Men's 200 m freestyle	1:49.31	38	did not advance			
Henrik Christiansen	Men's 400 m freestyle	3:46.96	11	—		did not advance	
Henrik Christiansen	Men's 800 m freestyle	7:47.61	3 Q	—		7:44.21	4
Henrik Christiansen	Men's 1500 m freestyle	14:57.41	6 Q	—		14:54.58 NR	5
Markus Lie	Men's 100 m freestyle	49.65	35	did not advance			
Markus Lie	Men's 50 m backstroke	25.71	33	did not advance			
Susann Bjørnsen	Women's 50 m freestyle	25.27	22	did not advance			
Susann Bjørnsen	Women's 100 m freestyle	56.56	=33	did not advance			
Susann Bjørnsen	Women's 50 m breaststroke	31.75	24	did not advance			
