= Norway at the 2023 World Aquatics Championships =

- Flag of Norway
- FINA code: NOR
- National federation: Norwegian Swimming Federation
- Website: www.svomming.no

in Fukuoka, Japan
- Competitors: 7 in 2 sports
- Medals: Gold 0 Silver 0 Bronze 0 Total 0

World Aquatics Championships appearances
- 1973; 1975; 1978; 1982; 1986; 1991; 1994; 1998; 2001; 2003; 2005; 2007; 2009; 2011; 2013; 2015; 2017; 2019; 2022; 2023; 2024

Norway competed at the 2023 World Aquatics Championships in Fukuoka, Japan from 14 to 30 July.

== Diving ==
Norway entered 3 divers.

Men

Athlete	Event	Preliminaries		Semifinals		Final	
Athlete	Event	Points	Rank	Points	Rank	Points	Rank
Isak Børslien	1 m springboard	280.45	43	—		Did not advance	
Isak Børslien	10 m platform	334.30	30	Did not advance			

Women

Athlete	Event	Preliminaries		Semifinals		Final	
Athlete	Event	Points	Rank	Points	Rank	Points	Rank
Caroline Kupka	1 m springboard	217.00	29	—		Did not advance	
Caroline Kupka	3 m springboard	184.70	50	Did not advance			
Helle Tuxen	1 m springboard	214.95	30	—		Did not advance	
Helle Tuxen	3 m springboard	262.45	25	Did not advance			
Helle Tuxen	10 m platform	222.05	33	Did not advance			

== Swimming ==
Norway entered 4 swimmers.

Men

Athlete	Event	Heat		Semifinal		Final	
Athlete	Event	Time	Rank	Time	Rank	Time	Rank
Henrik Christiansen	800 metre freestyle	7:50.46	18	—		Did not advance	
Henrik Christiansen	1500 metre freestyle	15:02.31	17	—		Did not advance	
Nicholas Lia	50 metre freestyle	21.94 NR	12 Q	22.12	15	Did not advance	
Nicholas Lia	100 metre freestyle	50.16	46	Did not advance			
Nicholas Lia	50 metre breaststroke	28.09	30	Did not advance			
Nicholas Lia	50 metre butterfly	23.43	20	Did not advance			
Markus Lie	50 metre backstroke	25.55	29	Did not advance			
Markus Lie	100 metre backstroke	54.66	27	Did not advance			

Women

Athlete	Event	Heat		Semifinal		Final	
Athlete	Event	Time	Rank	Time	Rank	Time	Rank
Ingeborg Løyning	50 metre backstroke	28.62	26	Did not advance			
Ingeborg Løyning	100 metre backstroke	1:01.32	25	Did not advance			
Ingeborg Løyning	200 metre backstroke	2:13.97	25	Did not advance			
