= Norway at the 2013 World Aquatics Championships =

- Flag of Norway
- FINA code: NOR
- National federation: Norges Svømmeforbund
- Website: www.svomming.no

in Barcelona, Spain
- Competitors: 8 in 2 sports
- Medals: Gold 0 Silver 0 Bronze 0 Total 0

World Aquatics Championships appearances
- 1973; 1975; 1978; 1982; 1986; 1991; 1994; 1998; 2001; 2003; 2005; 2007; 2009; 2011; 2013; 2015; 2017; 2019; 2022; 2023; 2024

Norway is competing at the 2013 World Aquatics Championships in Barcelona, Spain between 19 July and 4 August 2013.

== Diving ==
Norway qualified three quota places for the following diving events.

Men

Athlete	Event	Preliminaries		Semifinals		Final	
Athlete	Event	Points	Rank	Points	Rank	Points	Rank
Espen Bergslien	1 m springboard	306.50	25	—		Did not advance	
Espen Bergslien	3 m springboard	340.05	33	Did not advance			
Espen Valheim	3 m springboard	364.85	25	Did not advance			
Daniel Jensen	10 m platform	328.45	25	Did not advance			
Espen Valheim	10 m platform	344.45	23	Did not advance			
Daniel Jensen; Espen Valheim	10 m synchronized platform	336.96	13	—		Did not advance	

== Swimming ==
Norwegian swimmers achieved qualifying standards in the following events (up to a maximum of 2 swimmers in each event at the A-standard entry time, and 1 at the B-standard):

Men

Athlete	Event	Heat		Semifinal		Final	
Athlete	Event	Time	Rank	Time	Rank	Time	Rank
Lavrans Solli	50 m backstroke	25.15 NR	11 Q	25.18	11	Did not advance	
Lavrans Solli	100 m backstroke	55.52	23	Did not advance			

Women

Athlete	Event	Preliminaries		Semifinals		Final	
Athlete	Event	Points	Rank	Points	Rank	Points	Rank
Susann Bjørnsen	50 m freestyle	26.09	34	Did not advance			
Susann Bjørnsen	100 m freestyle	56.73	43	Did not advance			
Henriette Brekke	50 m breaststroke	32.11	31	Did not advance			
Ingvild Snildal	50 m butterfly	26.87	24	Did not advance			
Ingvild Snildal	100 m butterfly	58.83	11 Q	58.84	13	Did not advance	
Ingvild Snildal	200 m butterfly	DNS		Did not advance			
Susann Bjørnsen; Henriette Brekke; Monica Johannessen; Ingvild Snildal	4×100 m freestyle relay	3:45.01	13	—		Did not advance	
