= 2021 FINA World Swimming Championships (25 m) – Men's 4 × 100 metre medley relay =

Swimming competition

Men's 4 × 100 metre medley relay at the 2021 FINA World Swimming Championships (25 m)
- Venue: Etihad Arena
- Location: Abu Dhabi, United Arab Emirates
- Dates: 21 December (heats and final)
- Competitors: 74 from 15 nations
- Teams: 15
- Winning time: 3:19.76 CR

Medalists
gold medal	Lorenzo Mora; Nicolò Martinenghi; Matteo Rivolta; Alessandro Miressi; Thomas Ceccon; Alberto Razzetti; Lorenzo Zazzeri	Italy
silver medal	Shaine Casas; Nic Fink; Trenton Julian; Ryan Held; Hunter Tapp; Will Licon; Zach Apple	United States
bronze medal	Kliment Kolesnikov; Danil Semianinov; Andrey Minakov; Aleksandr Shchegolev; Pavel Samusenko; Alexander Zhigalov; Roman Shevliakov; Vladislav Grinev

The Men's 4 × 100 metre medley relay competition of the 2021 FINA World Swimming Championships (25 m) was held on 21 December 2021.

== Records ==
Prior to the competition, the existing world and championship records were as follows.

World record	Russia (RUS)	3:19.16	Saint Petersburg, Russia	20 December 2009
Competition record	United States (USA)	3:19.98	Hangzhou, China	16 December 2018

The following new records were set during this competition:

Date	Event	Name	Nation	Time	Record
21 December	Final	Lorenzo Mora (50.34); Nicolò Martinenghi (55.94); Matteo Rivolta (48.43); Alessandro Miressi (45.05)	Italy	3:19.76	CR

== Results ==
=== Heats ===
The heats were started at 10:09.

Rank	Heat	Lane	Nation	Swimmers	Time	Notes
1	1	4	Russian Swimming Federation	Pavel Samusenko (50.48); Alexander Zhigalov (57.74); Roman Shevliakov (50.70); Vladislav Grinev (46.09)	3:25.01	Q
2	2	5	Italy	Thomas Ceccon (50.96); Nicolò Martinenghi (56.90); Alberto Razzetti (50.48); Lorenzo Zazzeri (47.24)	3:25.58	Q
3	2	4	United States	Hunter Tapp (52.52); Will Licon (57.40); Trenton Julian (49.25); Zach Apple (46.80)	3:25.97	Q
4	1	5	Brazil	Guilherme Guido (50.31); Caio Pumputis (58.20); Nicholas Santos (50.46); Breno Correia (47.33)	3:26.30	Q
5	1	2	Netherlands	Kenzo Simons (54.10); Arno Kamminga (56.17); Nyls Korstanje (50.08); Luc Kroon (46.91)	3:27.26	Q, NR
6	1	3	France	Mewen Tomac (50.99); Antoine Viquerat (57.14); Thomas Piron (51.85); Jordan Pothain (47.54)	3:27.52	Q
7	1	1	Norway	Markus Lie (51.22); André Grindheim (58.68); Tomoe Hvas (50.42); Nicholas Lia (47.27)	3:27.59	Q, NR
8	2	6	Lithuania	Danas Rapšys (52.04); Andrius Šidlauskas (58.48); Deividas Margevičius (50.75); Simonas Bilis (47.91)	3:29.18	Q
9	2	7	Turkey	Berke Saka (52.62 ) Emre Sakçı (58.03); Rasim Oğulcan Gör (51.56); Baturalp Ünlü (48.03)	3:30.24	
10	2	3	China	Song Yukuan (53.32); Qin Haiyang (58.00); Wang Changhao (51.14); Pan Zhanle (47.86)	3:30.32	
11	2	1	Israel	Yakov Toumarkin (51.99); Kristian Pitshugin (58.67); Eitan Ben Shitrit (52.45); Denis Loktev (47.64)	3:30.75	NR
12	1	8	Egypt	Mohamed Samy (52.55); Youssef El-Kamash (59.71); Youssef Ramadan (50.89); Abdelrahman Sameh (47.68)	3:30.83	NR
13	1	6	South Korea	Won Young-jun (52.82); Moon Jae-kwon (58.31); Moon Seung-woo (52.86); Lee Ho-joon (48.88)	3:32.87	
14	1	0	Hong Kong	Lau Shiu Yue (53.61); Michael Ng (1:01.93); Ho Tin Long (53.17); Cheuk Ming Ho (48.22)	3:36.93	NR
15	2	9	Vietnam	Trần Hưng Nguyên (53.48); Phạm Thanh Bảo (59.95); Hồ Nguyễn Duy Khoa (54.47); Nguyễn Hữu Kim Sơn (50.66)	3:38.56	
	1	7	Bulgaria		DNS	
	2	0	Slovakia		DNS	
	2	2	Austria		DNS	
	2	8	Singapore		DNS	

=== Final ===
The final was held at 19:50.

Rank	Lane	Nation	Swimmers	Time	Notes
1st place, gold medalist(s)	5	Italy	Lorenzo Mora (50.34); Nicolò Martinenghi (55.94); Matteo Rivolta (48.43); Alessandro Miressi (45.05)	3:19.76	CR, NR
2nd place, silver medalist(s)	3	United States	Shaine Casas (50.44); Nic Fink (55.27); Trenton Julian (49.36); Ryan Held (45.43)	3:20.50	
3rd place, bronze medalist(s)	4	Russian Swimming Federation	Kliment Kolesnikov (49.47); Danil Semianinov (57.06); Andrey Minakov (48.81); Aleksandr Shchegolev (45.31)	3:20.65	
4	6	Brazil	Guilherme Guido (50.16); Caio Pumputis (57.36); Vinicius Lanza (49.62); Gabriel Santos (46.43)	3:23.57	
5	1	Norway	Markus Lie (51.00 NR); André Grindheim (57.73); Tomoe Hvas (49.96); Nicholas Lia (46.94)	3:25.63	NR
6	2	Netherlands	Stan Pijnenburg (53.61); Arno Kamminga (56.14); Nyls Korstanje (50.48); Luc Kroon (46.36)	3:26.59	NR
7	8	Lithuania	Danas Rapšys (51.91); Andrius Šidlauskas (58.30); Deividas Margevičius (50.90); Simonas Bilis (47.84)	3:28.95	
	7	France	Mewen Tomac (50.66); Antoine Viquerat; Thomas Piron; Maxime Grousset	DSQ	
