= List of Faroese records in swimming =

The Faroese records in swimming are ratified by the Faroese Swimming Federation: Svimjisamband Føroya (SSF).

== Long course (50 m) ==
=== Men ===
Event	Time		Name	Club	Date	Meet	Location	Ref
50 m freestyle	23.13		Bartal Erlingsson Eidesgaard	Havnar Svimjifelag	7 June 2026	Faroese Championships	Torshavn, Faroe Islands	
100 m freestyle	50.87	b	Isak Brisenfeldt	Aalborg	11 July 2026	Danish Championships	Herning, Denmark	
200 m freestyle	1:48.98		Pál Joensen	Suðuroyar Svimjifelag	23 March 2012	Danish Open	Brønshøj, Denmark	
400 m freestyle	3:46.84		Pál Joensen	Suðuroyar Svimjifelag	22 March 2012	Danish Open	Brønshøj, Denmark	
800 m freestyle	7:45.55	h	Pál Joensen	Faroe Islands	26 July 2011	World Championships	Shanghai, China	
1500 m freestyle	14:46.33		Pál Joensen	Faroe Islands	31 July 2011	World Championships	Shanghai, China	
50m backstroke	26.34		Magnus Jákupsson	-	10 July 2012	Danish Championships	Esbjerg, Denmark	
100m backstroke	56.64		Magnus Jákupsson	-	15 July 2012	Danish Championships	Esbjerg, Denmark	
200m backstroke	2:04.12	sf	Magnus Jákupsson	Faroe Islands	6 July 2012	European Junior Championships	Antwerp, Belgium	
50m breaststroke	28.81		Bartal Erlingsson Eidesgaard	Havnar Svimjifelag	24 April 2026	Swim Open Torshavn	Torshavn, Faroe Islands	
100m breaststroke	1:05.35		Róland Toftum	Suðuroyar Svimjifelag	4 April 2017	Danish Open	Bellahøj, Denmark	
200m breaststroke	2:21.71	h	Pál Joensen	Faroe Islands	25 May 2015	Bergen Swim Festival	Bergen, Norway	
50m butterfly	24.69	sf	Magnus Jákupsson	Faroe Islands	4 July 2012	European Junior Championships	Antwerp, Belgium	
100m butterfly	54.12	h	Magnus Jákupsson	Faroe Islands	7 July 2012	European Junior Championships	Antwerp, Belgium	
200m butterfly	2:02.28		Isak Brisenfeldt	Aalborg	9 July 2026	Danish Championships	Herning, Denmark	
200m individual medley	2:06.92	h	Magnus Jákupsson	-	13 July 2012	Danish Championships	Esbjerg, Denmark	
400m individual medley	4:30.17		Alvi Hjelm	Ægir Klaksvik	15 April 2016	Danish Open	Bellahøj, Denmark	
4×100m freestyle relay	3:29.39	h	Líggjas Joensen (52.03); Isak Brisenfeldt (51.23); Heini Mohr Askham (52.72); Silas Lindberg (53.41)	Faroe Islands	13 August 2026	European Championships	Paris, France	
4×200m freestyle relay	7:38.51	h	Isak Brisenfeldt (1:52.69); Heini Mohr Askham (1:55.79); Silas Lindberg (1:58.55); Líggjas Joensen (1:51.48)	Faroe Islands	10 August 2026	European Championships	Paris, France	
4×100m medley relay	3:57.61		Óli Mikkelsen (1:02.40); Bartal Erlingsson Eidesgaard (1:05.56); Isak Brisenfeldt (56.30); Silas Dam Lindberg (53.35)	Havnar Svimjifelag	25 April 2026	Swim Open Torshavn	Torshavn, Faroe Islands	

Legend: # – Record awaiting ratification by SSF; WR – World record; ER – European record; NR – Nordic record; e – equalled existing record;
Records not set in finals: h – heat; sf – semifinal; r – relay 1st leg; rh – relay heat 1st leg; b – B final; † – en route to final mark; so – swim-off; tt – time trial

=== Women ===
Event	Time		Name	Club	Date	Meet	Location	Ref
50m freestyle	26.52		Vár Erlingsdóttir Eidesgaard	Færøyene	15 April 2018	Bergen Swim Festival	Bergen, Norway	
100m freestyle	58.12	r	Vár Erlingsdóttir Eidesgaard	Havnar Svimjifelag	24 February 2018	-	Vágur, Faroe Islands	
200m freestyle	2:05.66	h	Sára Nysted	Faroe Islands	8 July 2016	European Junior Championships	Hódmezővásárhely, Hungary	
400m freestyle	4:22.79	h	Sára Nysted	Faroe Islands	7 July 2016	European Junior Championships	Hódmezővásárhely, Hungary	
800m freestyle	9:06.88		Vár Erlingsdóttir Eidesgaard	Faroe Islands	23 April 2022	Hungarian Championships	Debrecen, Hungary	
1500m freestyle	17:25.28		Vár Erlingsdóttir Eidesgaard	Havnar Svimjifelag	13 April 2016	Danish Open	Bellahøj, Denmark	
50m backstroke	29.47		Elisabeth Erlendsdóttir	Svimjisamband Føroya	13 April 2024	Danish Open	Bellahøj, Denmark	
100m backstroke	1:03.01	=	Signhild Joensen	Færøyene	14 April 2018	Bergen Swim Festival	Bergen, Norway	
100m backstroke	1:03.01	=	Signhild Joensen	Faroe Islands	6 April 2019	Bergen Swim Festival	Bergen, Norway	
200m backstroke	2:14.01		Signhild Joensen	Ægir Klaksvik	5 April 2017	Danish Open	Bellahøj, Denmark	
50m breaststroke	33.11		Lea Osberg Højsted	Svimjifelagið Ægir	24 April 2025	Swim Open Torshavn	Torshavn, Faroe Islands	
100m breaststroke	1:12.20		Lea Osberg Højsted	Svimjifelagið Ægir	25 April 2025	Swim Open Torshavn	Torshavn, Faroe Islands	
200m breaststroke	2:36.32		Lea Osberg Højsted	Svimjifelagið Ægir	8 April 2025	Danish Open	Copenhagen, Denmark	
50m butterfly	28.29	sf	Astrið Foldarskarð	-	30 March 2014	Danish Open	Copenhagen, Denmark	
100m butterfly	1:04.58	h	Poula Øssursdóttir Mohr	Faroe Islands	28 July 2013	World Championships	Barcelona, Spain	
200m butterfly	2:25.71		Jóhanna Ólavsdóttir	Fuglafjar	26 January 2025	International Games	Reykjavík, Iceland	
200m individual medley	2:20.41		Sára Nysted	Suðuroyar Svimjifelag	23 January 2016	Reykjavík International	Reykjavík, Iceland	
400m individual medley	4:59.73	h	Sára Nysted	Faroe Islands	6 July 2016	European Junior Championships	Hódmezővásárhely, Hungary	
4×50m freestyle relay	1:59.53		Eva Trygvadóttir (30.96); Turið Christiansen (29.33); Cecilia Eysturdal (28.14); Óluva Jacobsen (31.10)	Ægir Klaksvik	19 June 2010	Danish Championships	Gentofte, Denmark	
4×100m freestyle relay	4:03.56		Signhild Joensen (1:00.33); Jana Bjartalíð Thomsen (1:00.79); Barbara Debes (1:01.44); Ásbjørg Hjelm (1:01.00)	Ægir Klaksvik	27 May 2017	Faroese Championships	Vágur, Faroe Islands	
4×200m freestyle relay	8:55.15		Jana Bjartalíð Thomsen (2:10.32); Ásbjørg Hjelm (2:17.58); Barbara Debes (2:18.37); Signhild Joensen (2:08.88)	Ægir Klaksvik	12 March 2016	Faroese Championships	Vágur, Faroe Islands	
4×50m medley relay	2:14.45		Cecilia Eysturdal (34.09); Eva Trygvadóttir (37.77); Óluva Jacobsen (33.40); Turið Christiansen (29.19)	Faroe Islands	20 June 2010	Ægir Klaksvik	Gentofte, Denmark	
4×100m medley relay	4:33.08		Signhild Joensen (1:03.39); Rebekka Trygvadóttir (1:18.93); Malan Jóhansdóttir; Barbara Debes	Havnar Svimjifelag	26 April 2019	Faroese Championships	Vágur, Faroe Islands	

Legend: # – Record awaiting ratification by SSF; WR – World record; ER – European record; e – equalled existing record;
Records not set in finals: h – heat; sf – semifinal; r – relay 1st leg; rh – relay heat 1st leg; b – B final; † – en route to final mark; so – swim-off; tt – time trial

=== Mixed relay ===
Event	Time		Name	Club	Date	Meet	Location	Ref
4×100 m freestyle relay	3:53.85		Lea Osberg Hojsted (1:04.54); Heini Mohr Askham (54.19); Roa Trygvadottir (1:02.06); Liggjas Joensen (53.06)	Svimjifelagið Ægir	10 May 2024	Faroese Championships	Vágur, Faroe Islands	
4×100 m freestyle relay	3:48.88	h, #	Isak Brisenfeldt (51.94); Liggjas Joensen (52.90); Bjarta I Lagabo (1:02.86); Lea Højsted (1:01.18)	Faroe Islands	2 August 2025	World Championships	Singapore, Singapore	
4×100 m medley relay	4:10.29	h	Signhild Joensen (1:04.10); Róland Toftum (1:06.83); Óli Mortensen (58.62); Sára Nysted (1:00.94)	Faroe Islands	26 July 2017	World Championships	Budapest, Hungary	

Legend: # – Record awaiting ratification by SSF; WR – World record; ER – European record; e – equalled existing record;
Records not set in finals: h – heat; so – swim-off

== Short course (25 m) ==
=== Men ===
Event	Time		Name	Club	Date	Meet	Location	Ref
50m freestyle	22.55		Bartal Erlingsson Eidesgaard	Havnar	13 December 2025	HS Christmas Meet	Torshavn, Faroe Islands	
100m freestyle	49.27		Bartal Erlingsson Eidesgaard	Faroe Islands	16 July 2025	Island Games	Orkney, Great Britain	
200m freestyle	1:45.79		Isak Brisenfeldt	Aalborg	20 November 2026	DM for Hold - 1. Division	Kastrup, Denmark	
400m freestyle	3:40.12	h	Pál Joensen	Faroe Islands	9 December 2009	European Championships	Istanbul, Turkey	
800m freestyle	7:36.24		Pál Joensen	Faroe Islands	17 December 2011	Duel in the Pool	Atlanta, United States	
1500m freestyle	14:26.54		Pál Joensen	Faroe Islands	7 December 2014	World Championships	Doha, Qatar	
50m backstroke	25.22		Magnus Jákupsson	VAT København	31 March 2012	Danish Team Championships	Esbjerg, Denmark	
100m backstroke	54.45		Magnus Jákupsson	VAT København	1 April 2012	Danish Team Championships	Esbjerg, Denmark	
200m backstroke	1:59.98		Magnus Jákupsson	-	11 December 2011	Nordic Championships	Reykjavík, Iceland	
50m breaststroke	27.83		Bartal Erlingsson Eidesgaard	Faroe Islands	15 July 2025	Island Games	Orkney, Great Britain	
100m breaststroke	1:00.51		Bartal Erlingsson Eidesgaard	Faroe Islands	14 July 2025	Island Games	Orkney, Great Britain	
200m breaststroke	2:14.82		Pál Joensen	Faroe Islands	2 July 2015	Island Games	Saint Brélade, Jersey	
50m butterfly	24.63		Isak Brisenfeldt	Havnar	13 December 2025	HS Christmas Meet	Torshavn, Faroe Islands	
100m butterfly	53.67		Isak Brisenfeldt	Havnar	9 November 2024	Faroese Championships	Tórshavn, Faroe Islands	
200m butterfly	1:59.01		Isak Brisenfeldt	Faroe Islands	29 November 2025	Nordic Championships	Reykjavík, Iceland	
100m individual medley	55.94		Magnus Jákupsson	Havnar Svimjifelag	12 May 2012	Faroese Championships	Tórshavn, Faroe Islands	
200m individual medley	1:59.21		Isak Brisenfeldt	Aalborg	20 November 2026	DM for Hold - 1. Division	Kastrup, Denmark	
400m individual medley	4:18.97		Pál Joensen	Suðuroyar Svimjifelag	15 April 2012	SMS Stevna	Tórshavn, Faroe Islands	
4×50m freestyle relay	1:32.65		Bartal Erlingsson Eidesgaard (22.77); Heini Mohr Askham (23.83); Líggjas Joensen (22.91); Ísak Brisenfeldt (23.14)	Faroe Islands	15 July 2025	Island Games	Orkney, Great Britain	
4×100m freestyle relay	3:21.06		Ísak Brisenfeldt (50.78); Heini Mohr Askham (51.58); Bartal Erlingsson Eidesgaard (48.98); Líggjas Joensen (49.72)	Faroe Islands	17 July 2025	Island Games	Orkney, Great Britain	
4×200m freestyle relay	7:22.67		Bartal Erlingsson Eidesgaard (1:51.02); Heini Mohr Askham (1:53.45); Isak Brisenfeldt (1:50.23); Liggjas Joensen (1:47.97)	Faroe Islands	1 December 2024	Nordic Championships	Vejle, Denmark	
4×50m medley relay	1:43.46		Ísak Brisenfeldt (26.48); Heini Mohr Askham (29.21); Bartal Erlingsson Eidesgaard (24.36); Líggjas Joensen (23.41)	Faroe Islands	14 July 2025	Island Games	Orkney, Great Britain	
4×100m medley relay	3:44.77		Bartal Erlingsson Eidesgaard (56.89); Jón Hofgaard (1:03.82); Ísak Brisenfeldt (54.14); Líggjas Joensen (49.92)	Faroe Islands	16 July 2025	Island Games	Orkney, Great Britain	

Legend: # – Record awaiting ratification by SSF; WR – World record; ER – European record; NR – Nordic record; e – equalled existing record;
Records not set in finals: h – heat; sf – semifinal; r – relay 1st leg; rh – relay heat 1st leg; b – B final; † – en route to final mark; so – swim-off; tt – time trial

=== Women ===
Event	Time		Name	Club	Date	Meet	Location	Ref
50m freestyle	26.04		Guðrun Mortensen	Faroe Islands	11 December 2011	Nordic Championships	Reykjavík, Iceland	
100m freestyle	56.21	h	Vár Erlingsdóttir Eidesgaard	Faroe Islands	14 December 2022	World Championships	Melbourne, Australia	
200m freestyle	2:00.74		Vár Erlingsdóttir Eidesgaard	Faroe Islands	8 July 2019	Island Games	Gibraltar	
400m freestyle	4:14.09		Vár Erlingsdóttir Eidesgaard	Havnar Svimjifelag	12 November 2022	Faroese Championships	Tórshavn, Faroe Islands	
800m freestyle	8:40.57		Vár Erlingsdóttir Eidesgaard	Faroe Islands	1 December 2019	Nordic Championships	Tórshavn, Faroe Islands	
1500m freestyle	16:47.54		Vár Erlingsdóttir Eidesgaard	Faroe Islands	9 July 2019	Island Games	Gibraltar	
50m backstroke	28.03	r	Elisabeth Erlendsdóttir	Faroe Islands	15 July 2025	Island Games	Orkney, Great Britain	
100m backstroke	1:00.26		Elisabeth Erlendsdóttir	Faroe Islands	15 July 2025	Island Games	Orkney, Great Britain	
200m backstroke	2:09.32		Signhild Joensen	Faroe Islands	3 December 2017	Nordic Championships	Reykjavík, Iceland	
50m breaststroke	32.11		Lea Osberg Højsted	Ægir	7 November 2025	Faroese Championships	Tórshavn, Faroe Islands	
100m breaststroke	1:08.89		Lea Osberg Højsted	Ægir	8 November 2025	Faroese Championships	Tórshavn, Faroe Islands	
200m breaststroke	2:30.72		Lea Osberg Højsted	Faroe Islands	28 November 2025	Nordic Championships	Reykjavík, Iceland	
50m butterfly	27.67		Kristina Elin Thomsen	Suðuroyar Svimjifelag	11 May 2012	Faroese Championships	Tórshavn, Faroe Islands	
100m butterfly	1:01.93		Poula Mohr	-	14 April 2013	SMS Stevna	Tórshavn, Faroe Islands	
200m butterfly	2:18.50		Jóhanna Ólavsdóttir	Ægir	31 October 2026	Ægir Open	Klaksvík, Faroe Islands	
100m individual medley	1:03.78		Poula Mohr	Havnar Svimjifelag	11 May 2013	Faroese Championships	Tórshavn, Faroe Islands	
200m individual medley	2:16.52		Sára Nysted	Faroe Islands	11 December 2015	Nordic Junior Championships	Bergen, Norway	
400m individual medley	4:50.30		Sára Nysted	Faroe Islands	12 December 2015	Nordic Junior Championships	Bergen, Norway	
4×50m freestyle relay	1:46.71		Elisabeth Erlendsdóttir (26.44); Lea Osberg Højsted (26.52); Jonna Joensen (27.67); Alisa Vestergård (26.08)	Faroe Islands	14 July 2025	Island Games	Orkney, Great Britain	
4×100m freestyle relay	3:51.66		Vár Eidesgaard; Signhild Joensen; Sára Nysted; Jana Thomsen	Faroe Islands	28 June 2017	Island Games	Visby, Sweden	
4×200m freestyle relay	8:26.81		Vár Eidesgaard (2:03.34); Signhild Joensen (2:07.01); Barbara Debes (2:09.20); Alisa Vestergaard (2:07.26)	Faroe Islands	29 November 2019	Nordic Championships	Tórshavn, Faroe Islands	
4×50m medley relay	1:54.49		Elisabeth Erlendsdóttir (28.03); Lea Osberg Højsted (32.35); Bjarta Nolsøe Í Lágabø (28.18); Alisa Vestergård (25.93)	Faroe Islands	15 July 2025	Island Games	Orkney, Great Britain	
4×100m medley relay	4:15.25		Elisabeth Erlendsdóttir (1:02.40); Lea Osberg Højsted (1:11.05); Jóhanna Ólavsdóttir (1:03.99); Alisa Vestergård (57.81)	Faroe Islands	17 July 2025	Island Games	Orkney, Great Britain	

Legend: # – Record awaiting ratification by SSF; WR – World record; ER – European record; e – equalled existing record;
Records not set in finals: h – heat; sf – semifinal; r – relay 1st leg; rh – relay heat 1st leg; b – B final; † – en route to final mark; so – swim-off; tt – time trial

=== Mixed relay ===
Event	Time	Name	Club	Date	Meet	Location	Ref
4×50 m freestyle relay	1:38.61	Bartal Erlingsson Eidesgaard (22.67); Elisabeth Erlendsdóttir (26.47); Alisa Vestergård (26.31); Líggjas Joensen (23.16)	Faroe Islands	17 July 2025	Island Games	Orkney, Great Britain	
4×50 m medley relay	1:47.02	Elisabeth Erlendsdóttir (28.23); Bartal Erlingsson Eidesgaard (28.16); Ísak Brisenfeldt (24.73); Alisa Vestergård (25.90)	Faroe Islands	14 July 2025	Island Games	Orkney, Great Britain	

Legend: # – Record awaiting ratification by SSF; WR – World record; ER – European record; e – equalled existing record;
Records not set in finals: h – heat; so – swim-off
