= Norway at the 2024 World Aquatics Championships =

- Flag of Norway
- FINA code: NOR
- National federation: Norwegian Swimming Federation
- Website: www.svomming.no

in Doha, Qatar
- Competitors: 7 in 2 sports
- Medals: Gold 0 Silver 0 Bronze 0 Total 0

World Aquatics Championships appearances
- 1973; 1975; 1978; 1982; 1986; 1991; 1994; 1998; 2001; 2003; 2005; 2007; 2009; 2011; 2013; 2015; 2017; 2019; 2022; 2023; 2024

Norway competed at the 2024 World Aquatics Championships in Doha, Qatar from 2 to 18 February.

== Competitors ==
The following is the list of competitors in the Championships.

Sport	Men	Women	Total
Diving	1	2	3
Swimming	3	1	4
Total	4	3	7

== Diving ==
Men

Athlete	Event	Preliminaries		Semifinals		Final	
Athlete	Event	Points	Rank	Points	Rank	Points	Rank
Isak Børslien	3 m springboard	323.45	40	Did not advance			
Isak Børslien	10 m platform	338.15	28	Did not advance			

Women

Athlete	Event	Preliminaries		Semifinals		Final	
Athlete	Event	Points	Rank	Points	Rank	Points	Rank
Caroline Kupka	1 m springboard	199.30	30	—		Did not advance	
Helle Tuxen	3 m springboard	246.00	19	Did not advance			
Helle Tuxen	10 m platform	227.70	32	Did not advance			

== Swimming ==
Norway entered 4 swimmers.

Men

Athlete	Event	Heat		Semifinal		Final	
Athlete	Event	Time	Rank	Time	Rank	Time	Rank
Henrik Christiansen	800 metre freestyle	7:51.21	17	—		Did not advance	
Henrik Christiansen	1500 metre freestyle	15:12.25	18	—		Did not advance	
Jon Joentvedt	400 metre freestyle	3:50.71	27	—		Did not advance	
Jon Joentvedt	800 metre freestyle	7:56.28	25	—		Did not advance	
Nicholas Lia	50 metre freestyle	22.19	19	Did not advance			
Nicholas Lia	50 metre breaststroke	27.97	21	Did not advance			
Nicholas Lia	50 metre butterfly	23.18 NR	5 Q	23.47	14	Did not advance	

Women

Athlete	Event	Heat		Semifinal		Final	
Athlete	Event	Time	Rank	Time	Rank	Time	Rank
Silje Slyngstadli	50 metre breaststroke	30.86 NR	9 Q	31.34	15	Did not advance	
Silje Slyngstadli	100 metre breaststroke	1:10.42	31	Did not advance			
