= Norway at the 2022 World Aquatics Championships =

- Flag of Norway
- FINA code: NOR
- National federation: Norges Svømmeforbund
- Website: www.svomming.no

in Budapest, Hungary
- Competitors: 5 in 2 sports
- Medals: Gold 0 Silver 0 Bronze 0 Total 0

World Aquatics Championships appearances
- 1973; 1975; 1978; 1982; 1986; 1991; 1994; 1998; 2001; 2003; 2005; 2007; 2009; 2011; 2013; 2015; 2017; 2019; 2022; 2023; 2024

Norway competed at the 2022 World Aquatics Championships in Budapest, Hungary from 17 June to 3 July.

== Diving ==
Norway's diving team consisted of 2 athletes (2 female).

Women

Athlete	Event	Preliminaries		Semifinals		Final	
Athlete	Event	Points	Rank	Points	Rank	Points	Rank
Caroline Kupka	1 m springboard	161.80	44	—		did not advance	
Caroline Kupka	3 m springboard	Withdrawn		did not advance			
Helle Tuxen	1 m springboard	189.55	38	—		did not advance	
Helle Tuxen	3 m springboard	234.75	26	did not advance			
Helle Tuxen	10 m platform	214.75	29	did not advance			

== Swimming ==
Norway entered three swimmers.

Men

Athlete	Event	Heat		Semifinal		Final	
Athlete	Event	Time	Rank	Time	Rank	Time	Rank
Henrik Christiansen	400 m freestyle	3:50.18	18	—		did not advance	
Henrik Christiansen	800 m freestyle	7:50.98	11	—		did not advance	
Henrik Christiansen	1500 m freestyle	15:09.53	13	—		did not advance	
André Klippenberg Grindheim	50 m breaststroke	27.90	21	did not advance			
André Klippenberg Grindheim	100 m breaststroke	1:01.99	30	did not advance			
André Klippenberg Grindheim	200 m breaststroke	DNS		did not advance			
Nicholas Lia	50 m freestyle	22.26	20	did not advance			
Nicholas Lia	100 m freestyle	49.83	37	did not advance			
Nicholas Lia	50 m butterfly	23.62	=21	did not advance			
