= Norway at the 2019 World Aquatics Championships =

- Flag of Norway
- World Aquatics code: NOR
- National federation: Norges Svømmeforbund
- Website: www.svomming.no

in Gwangju, South Korea
- Medals Ranked 18th: Gold 0 Silver 1 Bronze 0 Total 1

World Aquatics Championships appearances
- 1973; 1975; 1978; 1982; 1986; 1991; 1994; 1998; 2001; 2003; 2005; 2007; 2009; 2011; 2013; 2015; 2017; 2019; 2022; 2023; 2024; 2025

Norway competed at the 2019 World Aquatics Championships in Gwangju, South Korea from 12 to 28 July.

== Medalists ==
Medal	Name	Sport	Event	Date
Silver	Henrik Christiansen	Swimming	Men's 800 metre freestyle	24 July

== Diving ==
Norway's diving team consisted of 2 athletes (2 female).

Women

Athlete	Event	Preliminaries		Semifinals		Final	
Athlete	Event	Points	Rank	Points	Rank	Points	Rank
Helle Tuxen	3 m springboard	229.40	36	Did not advance			
Helle Tuxen	10 m platform	240.05	27	Did not advance			
Anne Tuxen	10 m platform	180.70	37	Did not advance			
Anne Tuxen; Helle Tuxen	Synchronized 3 m springboard	223.32	19	—N/a		Did not advance	
Anne Tuxen; Helle Tuxen	Synchronized 10 m platform	231.60	13	—N/a		Did not advance	

== Swimming ==
Norway entered four swimmers.

Men

Athlete	Event	Heat		Semifinal		Final	
Athlete	Event	Time	Rank	Time	Rank	Time	Rank
Henrik Christiansen	400 m freestyle	3:46.99	10	—N/a		Did not advance	
Henrik Christiansen	800 m freestyle	7:46.53	5 Q	—N/a		7:41.28 NR	2nd place, silver medalist(s)
Henrik Christiansen	1500 m freestyle	14:50.28	5 Q	—N/a		14:45.35	5
Tomoe Zenimoto Hvas	50 m backstroke	DNS		Did not advance			
Tomoe Zenimoto Hvas	100 m backstroke	55.42	34	Did not advance			
Tomoe Zenimoto Hvas	50 m butterfly	23.67	18	Did not advance			
Tomoe Zenimoto Hvas	100 m butterfly	DNS		Did not advance			
Tomoe Zenimoto Hvas	200 m individual medley	DNS		Did not advance			
Niksa Stojkovski	50 m freestyle	22.79	46	Did not advance			
Niksa Stojkovski	100 m freestyle	50.44	=53	Did not advance			
Niksa Stojkovski	50 m butterfly	23.75	22	Did not advance			

Women

Athlete	Event	Heat		Semifinal		Final	
Athlete	Event	Time	Rank	Time	Rank	Time	Rank
Ingeborg Løyning	50 m backstroke	28.67	23	Did not advance			
Ingeborg Løyning	100 m backstroke	1:00.47	14 Q	Did not advance			
Ingeborg Løyning	200 m backstroke	2:13.25	24	Did not advance			
