= 2018 FINA World Swimming Championships (25 m) – Men's 200 metre freestyle =

Men's 200 metre freestyle at the 2018 FINA World Swimming Championships (25 m)
- Venue: Hangzhou Sports Park Stadium
- Dates: 12 December (heats and final)
- Competitors: 64
- Winning time: 1:41.49

Medalists
| gold medal | Blake Pieroni | United States |
| silver medal | Danas Rapšys | Lithuania |
| bronze medal | Alexander Graham | Australia |

The Men's 200 metre freestyle competition of the 2018 FINA World Swimming Championships (25 m) were held on 12 December 2018.

== Records ==
Prior to the competition, the existing world and championship records were as follows.

| | Name | Nation | Time | Location | Date |
|---|---|---|---|---|---|
| World record | Paul Biedermann | Germany | 1:39.37 | Berlin | 15 November 2009 |
| Championship record | Park Tae-hwan | South Korea | 1:41.03 | Windsor | 7 December 2016 |

== Results ==
=== Heats ===
The heats were started at 09:37.

| Rank | Heat | Lane | Name | Nationality | Time | Notes |
|---|---|---|---|---|---|---|
| 1 | 5 | 6 | Alexander Graham | Australia | 1:41.83 | Q |
| 2 | 5 | 5 | Luiz Altamir Melo | Brazil | 1:42.13 | Q |
| 3 | 7 | 4 | Danas Rapšys | Lithuania | 1:42.39 | Q |
| 4 | 6 | 3 | Breno Correia | Brazil | 1:42.64 | Q |
| 5 | 7 | 5 | Ji Xinjie | China | 1:42.70 | Q |
| 6 | 7 | 3 | Martin Malyutin | Russia | 1:42.76 | Q |
| 7 | 6 | 5 | Mikhail Vekovishchev | Russia | 1:42.77 | Q |
| 8 | 6 | 4 | Blake Pieroni | United States | 1:42.90 | Q |
| 9 | 6 | 6 | Filippo Megli | Italy | 1:43.16 | |
| 10 | 5 | 4 | Chad le Clos | South Africa | 1:43.19 | |
| 11 | 5 | 3 | Velimir Stjepanović | Serbia | 1:43.40 | |
| 12 | 5 | 2 | Dylan Carter | Trinidad and Tobago | 1:43.74 | |
| 13 | 6 | 0 | Miguel Nascimento | Portugal | 1:43.76 | |
| 14 | 6 | 7 | Jack Gerrard | Australia | 1:44.60 | |
| 15 | 4 | 5 | Jan Świtkowski | Poland | 1:44.62 | |
| 16 | 6 | 2 | Markus Lie | Norway | 1:44.88 | |
| 17 | 7 | 2 | Matteo Ciampi | Italy | 1:44.89 | |
| 18 | 5 | 1 | Erge Gezmis | Turkey | 1:45.20 | |
| 19 | 4 | 7 | Cristian Quintero | Venezuela | 1:45.24 | |
| 19 | 7 | 7 | Gustaf Dahlman | Sweden | 1:45.24 | |
| 21 | 4 | 0 | Mark Szanarek | United Kingdom | 1:45.39 | |
| 22 | 7 | 8 | Nils Liess | Switzerland | 1:45.47 | |
| 23 | 7 | 6 | Kregor Zirk | Estonia | 1:45.51 | |
| 24 | 7 | 1 | Marc Sánchez | Spain | 1:45.39 | |
| 25 | 7 | 0 | Daniel Hunter | New Zealand | 1:45.83 | |
| 26 | 4 | 3 | Marwan Elkamash | Egypt | 1:46.21 | |
| 27 | 5 | 8 | Alexander Trampitsch | Austria | 1:46.25 | |
| 28 | 5 | 7 | Shang Keyuan | China | 1:46.36 | |
| 29 | 4 | 8 | Marcelo Acosta | El Salvador | 1:47.00 | NR |
| 30 | 6 | 8 | Fuyu Yoshida | Japan | 1:47.07 | |
| 31 | 6 | 9 | Raphaël Stacchiotti | Luxembourg | 1:47.38 | |
| 32 | 4 | 9 | Alex Sobers | Barbados | 1:47.55 | NR |
| 33 | 4 | 6 | Sajan Prakash | India | 1:47.66 | NR |
| 34 | 6 | 1 | Daniel Dudas | Hungary | 1:47.84 | |
| 35 | 5 | 9 | Andrew Digby | Thailand | 1:48.05 | |
| 36 | 4 | 4 | Ben Hockin | Paraguay | 1:48.11 | |
| 37 | 3 | 4 | Yordan Yanchev | Bulgaria | 1:48.28 | |
| 38 | 5 | 0 | An Ting-Yao | Chinese Taipei | 1:48.53 | |
| 39 | 7 | 9 | Igor Mogne | Mozambique | 1:48.67 | |
| 40 | 4 | 1 | Cheuk Ming Ho | Hong Kong | 1:48.82 | |
| 41 | 4 | 2 | Mathieu Marquet | Mauritius | 1:50.19 | NR |
| 42 | 3 | 0 | Mohammed Bedour | Jordan | 1:50.29 | |
| 43 | 3 | 6 | Irakli Revishvili | Georgia | 1:50.52 | |
| 44 | 2 | 4 | Yeziel Miranda | Puerto Rico | 1:50.73 | |
| 45 | 3 | 2 | Noah Mascoll-Gomes | Antigua and Barbuda | 1:51.60 | NR |
| 46 | 3 | 1 | Pedro Chiancone | Uruguay | 1:52.07 | |
| 47 | 3 | 5 | Lin Sizhuang | Macau | 1:53.32 | |
| 48 | 2 | 9 | Cristian Santi | San Marino | 1:53.77 | |
| 49 | 3 | 3 | Matt Galea | Malta | 1:53.91 | |
| 50 | 2 | 0 | Dean Hoffman | Seychelles | 1:54.15 | NR |
| 51 | 3 | 7 | Andrej Stojanoski | Macedonia | 1:54.93 | |
| 52 | 3 | 8 | Amadou Ndiaye | Senegal | 1:55.25 | |
| 53 | 3 | 9 | Azman Mohamed | Singapore | 1:55.73 | |
| 54 | 2 | 5 | Kohen Kerr | Bahamas | 1:56.62 | |
| 55 | 2 | 2 | Noel Keane | Palau | 1:56.72 | |
| 56 | 2 | 3 | Firas Saidi | Qatar | 1:57.14 | |
| 57 | 2 | 6 | Spiro Goga | Albania | 1:57.86 | |
| 58 | 1 | 4 | Dren Ukimeraj | Kosovo | 1:58.44 | |
| 59 | 1 | 6 | Cruz Halbich | Saint Vincent and the Grenadines | 2:00.09 | |
| 60 | 1 | 3 | Daniel Scott | Guyana | 2:00.84 | |
| 61 | 2 | 7 | Fadhil Saleh | Uganda | 2:03.49 | |
| 62 | 2 | 8 | Aamir Motiwala | Pakistan | 2:04.69 | |
| 63 | 2 | 1 | Lennosuke Suzuki | Northern Mariana Islands | 2:06.54 | |
| 64 | 1 | 5 | Mubal Ibrahim | Maldives | 2:09.57 | |

=== Final ===
The final was held at 19:53.

| Rank | Lane | Name | Nationality | Time | Notes |
|---|---|---|---|---|---|
| 1st place, gold medalist(s) | 8 | Blake Pieroni | United States | 1:41.49 | |
| 2nd place, silver medalist(s) | 3 | Danas Rapšys | Lithuania | 1:41.78 | |
| 3rd place, bronze medalist(s) | 4 | Alexander Graham | Australia | 1:42.28 | |
| 4 | 2 | Ji Xinjie | China | 1:42.31 | |
| 5 | 6 | Breno Correia | Brazil | 1:42.36 | |
| 6 | 7 | Martin Malyutin | Russia | 1:42.46 | |
| 7 | 1 | Mikhail Vekovishchev | Russia | 1:42.67 | |
| 8 | 5 | Luiz Altamir Melo | Brazil | 1:42.72 | |
