= Swimming at the 2011 Island Games =

Swimming at the 2011 Island Games was held from 27–30 June 2011 at the Medina Leisure Centre. The events are held in a long course (50 m) pool.

== Events ==
=== Medal table ===
Rank	Nation	Gold	Silver	Bronze	Total
1	Faroe Islands	16	12	6	34
2	Guernsey	15	12	12	39
3	Shetland	5	2	3	10
4	Jersey	3	11	12	26
5	Isle of Man	2	4	3	9
6	Isle of Wight	2	1	1	4
7	Cayman Islands	0	2	4	6
8	Menorca	0	0	1	1
Totals (8 entries)		43	44	42	129

=== Men ===
Event	Gold		Silver		Bronze	
50m Freestyle	Pauli Øssursson Mohr (FRO)	23.59	Matthew Girard (GGY)	24.14	Heðin Lisberg Olsen (FRO)	24.20
100m Freestyle	Pál Joensen (FRO)	51.16	Tom Gallichan (Jersey)	51.51	Jeremy Osborne (GGY)	52.00
200m Freestyle	Pál Joensen (FRO)	1:49.83	Thomas Hollingsworth (GGY)	1:51.02	Tom Gallichan (Jersey)	1:51.52
400m Freestyle	Pál Joensen (FRO)	3:54.02	Tom Gallichan (Jersey)	3:55.23	Felix Gifford (Shetland Islands)	4:06.01
1500m Freestyle	Pál Joensen (FRO)	15:28.85	John Gallichan (Jersey)	15:38.59	Miles Munro (GGY)	16:25.24
50m Backstroke	Ian Powell (GGY)	25.27	Magnus Jákupsson (FRO)	25.84	Tom Gallichan (Jersey)	27.09
100m Backstroke	Ian Powell (GGY)	54.33	Magnus Jákupsson (FRO)	54.74	Thomas Hollingsworth (GGY)	56.47
200m Backstroke	Ian Powell (GGY)	1:58.14	Magnus Jákupsson (FRO)	2:00.86	Tom Gallichan (Jersey)	2:01.60
50 Breaststroke	Darren Mew (Isle of Wight)	28.37	Mikael Popov (Isle of Wight); Pauli Øssursson Mohr (FRO)	30.55		
100m Breaststroke	Darren Mew (Isle of Wight)	1:02.03	Thomas Hollingsworth (GGY)	1:03.69	Pál Joensen (FRO)	1:03.78
200m Breaststroke	Pál Joensen (FRO)	2:15.96	Thomas Hollingsworth (GGY)	2:16.96	Frank Estrada (Menorca)	2:22.72
50m Butterfly	Magnus Jákupsson (FRO)	24.79	Ian Powell (GGY)	24.91	Thomas Hollingsworth (GGY)	24.94
100m Butterfly	Ian Powell (GGY)	54.05	Thomas Hollingsworth (GGY)	54.85	Magnus Jákupsson (FRO)	55.95
200m Butterfly	Ian Powell (GGY)	1:58.43	Ben Lowndes (GGY)	2:04.31	Joel Rombough (CAY)	2:07.53
100m Individual Medley	Thomas Hollingsworth (GGY)	56.15	Pál Joensen (FRO)	58.81	Ben Lowndes (GGY)	58.87
200m Individual Medley	Thomas Hollingsworth (GGY)	2:01.00	Pál Joensen (FRO)	2:03.18	Joel Rombough (CAY)	2:08.99
400m Individual Medley	Pál Joensen (FRO)	4:23.10	Tom Gallichan (Jersey)	4:31.51	Joel Rombough (CAY)	4:32.53
4 x 50m Freestyle Relay	Faroe Islands; Magnus Jákupsson; Heðin Lisberg Olsen; Pauli Øssursson Mohr; Pál Joensen	1:43.15	Guernsey; Matthew Girard; Ben Lowndes; Jeremy Osborne; Ian Powell	1:43.23	Jersey; John Gallichan; Tom Gallichan; Antoin Le Fevre; Stefan McGreevy	1:48.49
4 × 100 m Freestyle Relay	Faroe Islands; Pál Joensen; Magnus Jákupsson; Pauli Øssursson Mohr; Heðin Lisberg Olsen	3:24.10	Guernsey; Thomas Hollingsworth; Ian Hubert; Jeremy Osborne; Ian Powell	3:25.20	Jersey; John Gallichan; Tom Gallichan; Antoin Le Fevre; Stefan McGreevy	3:28.58
4 x 50m Medley Relay	Guernsey; Matthew Girard; Thomas Hollingsworth; Ben Lowndes; Ian Powell	1:43.15	Faroe Islands; Magnus Jákupsson; Pauli Øssursson Mohr; Pál Joensen; Heðin Lisberg Olsen	1:43.23	Jersey; Tom Gallichan; Giovanni Guarino; Antoin Le Fevre; Stefan McGreevy	1:48.49
4 × 100 m Medley Relay	Guernsey; Thomas Hollingsworth; Ben Lowndes; Jeremy Osborne; Ian Powell	3:44.98	Faroe Islands; Magnus Jákupsson; Pál Joensen; Pauli Øssursson Mohr; Heðin Lisberg Olsen	3:47.81	Isle of Wight; Darren Mew; Charlie Stevens; Andrew Teague; Sam Tinson-Wood	3:56.26

=== Women ===
Event	Gold		Silver		Bronze	
50m Freestyle	Amy Harper (Shetland Islands)	27.01	Emily Bashforth (Jersey)	27.12	Birita Debes (FRO)	27.16
100m Freestyle	Emily Bashforth (Jersey)	57.41	Amy Harper (Shetland Islands)	58.15	Kristina Neves (GGY)	58.74
200m Freestyle	Kristina Neves (GGY)	2:02.05	Amy Harper (Shetland Islands)	2:03.11	Emily Bashforth (Jersey)	2:05.36
400m Freestyle	Kristina Neves (GGY)	4:16.97	Emily Bashforth (Jersey)	4:20.90	Amy Harper (Shetland Islands)	4:23.07
800m Freestyle	Kristina Neves (GGY)	8:47.98	Charlotte Atkinson (IOM)	8:55.92	Amy Harper (Shetland Islands)	8:57.24
50m Backstroke	Birita Debes (FRO)	29.82	Poula Øssursdóttir Mohr (FRO)	30.61	Kerrie Smith (Jersey)	30.91
100m Backstroke	Birita Debes (FRO)	1:02.80	Poula Øssursdóttir Mohr (FRO)	1:04.92	Charlotte De Wit (Jersey)	1:05.90
200m Backstroke	Charlotte Atkinson (IOM)	2:16.86	Lotte Parfit (GGY)	2:19.12	Charlotte De Wit (Jersey)	2:19.57
50m Breaststroke	Andrea Strachan (Shetland Islands)	32.57	Laura Kinley (IOM)	33.74	Poppy Evans (IOM)	34.42
100m Breaststroke	Andrea Strachan (Shetland Islands)	1:11.70	Charlotte Manning (Jersey)	1:13.50	Laura Kinley (IOM)	1:14.23
200m Breaststroke	Turið S. Christiansen (FRO)	2:38.22	Laura Kinley (IOM)	2:38.91	Victoria Parfit (GGY)	2:39.35
50m Butterfly	Kristina Neves (GGY)	28.88	Ebony Jacklin (Jersey)	29.30	Astrið Foldarskarð (FRO)	29.46
100m Butterfly	Kristina Neves (GGY)	1:03.03	Lara Butler (CAY)	1:04.42	Ebony Jacklin (Jersey)	1:05.32
200m Butterfly	Kristina Neves (GGY)	2:17.58	Charlotte Atkinson (IOM)	2:21.20	Lara Butler (CAY)	2:23.20
100m Individual Medley	Andrea Strachan (Shetland Islands)	1:04.59	Lara Butler (CAY)	1:06.14	Poula Øssursdóttir Mohr (FRO)	1:07.92
200m Individual Medley	Andrea Strachan (Shetland Islands)	2:20.18	Kristina Neves (GGY)	2:20.37	Charlotte Atkinson (IOM)	2:23.93
400m Individual Medley	Charlotte Atkinson (IOM)	4:50.78	Kristina Neves (GGY)	4:51.26	Ella Dias (Jersey)	4:55.00
4 x 50m Freestyle Relay	Faroe Islands; Birita Debes; Kristina Eliasen; Kristina Eliasen; Guðrun Mortensen	1:46.70	Jersey; Emily Bashforth; Ebony Jacklin; Maria Kocot; Kerrie Smith	1:47.99	Guernsey; Alicia Munro; Kristina Neves; Lotte Parfit; Victoria Parfit	1:51.91
4 × 100 m Freestyle Relay	Jersey; Emily Bashforth; Beth Cumming; Ebony Jacklin; Maria Kocot	3:55.20	Faroe Islands; Kristina Eliasen; Cecilia Wigant Eysturdal; Poula Øssursdóttir Mohr; Guðrun Mortensen	3:56.59	Guernsey; Nicole Hewlett; Kristina Neves; Lotte Parfit; Victoria Parfit	3:58.43
4 x 50m Medley Relay	Faroe Islands; Guðrun Mortensen; Tanja Skaalum; Birita Debes; Astrið Foldarskarð	1:58.82	Jersey; Ebony Jacklin; Maria Kocot; Charlotte Manning; Kerrie Smith	2:00.78	Guernsey; Nicole Hewlett; Kristina Neves; Lotte Parfit; Victoria Parfit	2:02.13
4 × 100 m Medley Relay	Jersey; Emily Bashforth; Charlotte De Wit; Ebony Jacklin; Charlotte Manning	4:21.16	Faroe Islands; Cecilia Wigant Eysturdal; Birita Debes; Turið S. Christiansen; Poula Øssursdóttir Mohr	4:22.75	Guernsey; Nicole Hewlett; Kristina Neves; Lotte Parfit; Victoria Parfit	4:24.89

=== Mixed ===
Event	Gold		Silver		Bronze	
8 x 50m Freestyle Relay	Faroe Islands	3:21.26	Jersey	3:24.52	Guernsey	3:24.95
