= Norway at the 2015 World Aquatics Championships =

- Flag of Norway
- FINA code: NOR
- National federation: Norges Svømmeforbund
- Website: www.svomming.no

in Kazan, Russia
- Competitors: 7 in 2 sports
- Medals: Gold 0 Silver 0 Bronze 0 Total 0

World Aquatics Championships appearances
- 1973; 1975; 1978; 1982; 1986; 1991; 1994; 1998; 2001; 2003; 2005; 2007; 2009; 2011; 2013; 2015; 2017; 2019; 2022; 2023; 2024

Norway competed at the 2015 World Aquatics Championships in Kazan, Russia from 24 July to 9 August 2015.

== Diving ==
Norwegian divers qualified for the individual spots and synchronized teams at the World Championships.

Men

Athlete	Event	Preliminaries		Semifinals		Final	
Athlete	Event	Points	Rank	Points	Rank	Points	Rank
Espen Bergslien	1 m springboard	292.55	30	—		did not advance	
Espen Bergslien	3 m springboard	321.05	46	did not advance			
Daniel Jensen	10 m platform	316.10	41	did not advance			
Espen Valheim	10 m platform	358.05	34	did not advance			
Filip Devor; Daniel Jensen	3 m synchronized springboard	338.31	18	—		did not advance	
Filip Devor; Daniel Jensen	10 m synchronized platform	342.87	18	—		did not advance	

== Swimming ==
Norwegian swimmers have achieved qualifying standards in the following events (up to a maximum of 2 swimmers in each event at the A-standard entry time, and 1 at the B-standard):

Men

Athlete	Event	Heat		Semifinal		Final	
Athlete	Event	Time	Rank	Time	Rank	Time	Rank
Henrik Christiansen	200 m freestyle	1:49.09	33	did not advance			
Henrik Christiansen	400 m freestyle	3:47.71	13	—		did not advance	
Henrik Christiansen	800 m freestyle	7:49.70	8 Q	—		7:45.56	5
Henrik Christiansen	1500 m freestyle	15:02.37	12	—		did not advance	
Henrik Christiansen	400 m individual medley	4:21.67	25	—		did not advance	
Lavrans Solli	50 m backstroke	25.28	15 Q	25.93	8 Q	24.84	6
Lavrans Solli	100 m backstroke	55.28	34	did not advance			
Lavrans Solli	200 m backstroke	1:59.23	21	did not advance			

Women

Athlete	Event	Heat		Semifinal		Final	
Athlete	Event	Time	Rank	Time	Rank	Time	Rank
Cecilie Johannessen	50 m freestyle	25.55	=29	did not advance			
Cecilie Johannessen	100 m freestyle	55.51	27	did not advance			
Cecilie Johannessen	200 m freestyle	2:00.67	28	did not advance			
