= Alexander Dale Oen =

Norwegian swimmer (1985–2012)

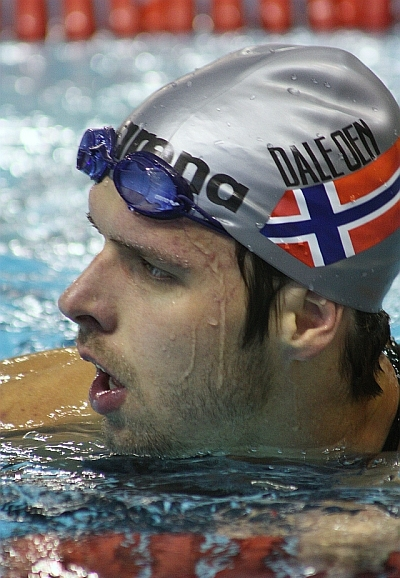
- Dale Oen at the Reykjavík International Games 2009

Personal information
- Nationality: Norway
- Born: 21 May 1985 Øygarden Municipality, Norway
- Died: 30 April 2012 (aged 26) Flagstaff, Arizona, United States
- Height: 1.90 m (6 ft 3 in)
- Weight: 80 kg (176 lb)

Sport
- Sport: Swimming
- Strokes: Breaststroke
- Club: Vestkantsvømmerne (1995–2010); Bærumsvømmerne (2011–2012)
Medal record
Men's swimming
Representing Norway
Olympic Games
Silver medal – second place	2008 Beijing	100 m breaststroke
World Championships (LC)
Gold medal – first place	2011 Shanghai	100 m breaststroke
World Championships (SC)
Bronze medal – third place	2006 Shanghai	100 m breaststroke
European Championships (LC)
Gold medal – first place	2008 Eindhoven	100 m breaststroke
Gold medal – first place	2010 Budapest	100 m breaststroke
Silver medal – second place	2006 Budapest	100 m breaststroke
Silver medal – second place	2008 Eindhoven	200 m breaststroke
Silver medal – second place	2008 Eindhoven	50 m breaststroke
Silver medal – second place	2010 Budapest	200 m breaststroke
European Championships (SC)
Gold medal – first place	2011 Szczecin	100 m breaststroke
Bronze medal – third place	2006 Helsinki	100 m breaststroke
Bronze medal – third place	2011 Szczecin	50 m breaststroke
European Junior Championships (LC)
Silver medal – second place	2003 Glasgow	100 m breaststroke

Alexander Dale Oen (Norwegian pronunciation: [ɑɫɛkˈsɑ̀ndər ˈdɑ̀ːɫə ˈùːən]; 21 May 1985 – 30 April 2012) was a Norwegian competitive swimmer. He was an Olympic silver medallist, World Championships gold medallist, World Championships (25m) bronze medallist, two-time European Championships gold medallist and European Short Course Championships gold medallist in the 100 metre breaststroke.

Dale Oen competed at the 2004 and 2008 Summer Olympics, and represented the clubs Vestkantsvømmerne (1995–2010) and Bærumsvømmerne (2011–2012). He was the first Norwegian swimmer in history to win an Olympic medal and the first Norwegian male swimmer to win medals at the World Championships and European Championships. Dale Oen was the former Olympic and European record holder in the 100 m breaststroke, and holds the Nordic record in the 100 m long course breaststroke and the Norwegian national record in the 50 m, 100 m and 200 m long course breaststroke and the 100 m and 200 m short course breaststroke.

On 30 April 2012, Dale Oen died after suffering a heart attack caused by chronic, undetected coronary heart disease. He was attending a training camp with the Norwegian swimming team in Flagstaff, Arizona at the time of his death.

== Career ==
Dale Oen won his first international medal when he placed second in the 100 m breaststroke at the 2003 European Junior Championships in Glasgow, becoming the first Norwegian male swimmer to win a medal at an international championship. He made his senior European Championships debut at the 2004 championships in Madrid and competed in the 100 m breaststroke event at the 2004 Summer Olympics in Athens.

In 2005, Dale Oen got his international breakthrough when he placed seventh and fourth in the 100 m breaststroke at the 2005 World Championships in Quebec and 2005 European Short Course Championships in Trieste respectively. He set a new Nordic Record in the event at the latter championship with a time of 59.05 seconds during the qualification heats and became the first Norwegian to swim the distance in less than 1 minute.

At the 2006 World Championships (25m) in Shanghai, Dale Oen won a bronze medal in the 100 m breaststroke and became the first Norwegian swimmer to win a World Championships medal in 28 years. He followed up the achievement at the 2006 European Championships in Budapest, where he won the silver medal in the 100 m breaststroke, setting a new Nordic record in long course with a time of 1:00.63, and became the first Norwegian male swimmer in history to win a European Championships individual medal. Dale Oen won his first short course medal at the 2006 European Short Course Championships in Helsinki, taking bronze in the 100 m breaststroke and setting a new personal best and Nordic record with a time of 58.70.

During the 2007 World Championships in Melbourne, Dale Oen was the second fastest in the qualification heats of the 100 metre breaststroke, setting a new Nordic record with the time of 1:00.34, and third fastest in the semifinal, but finished last in the final. At the 2007 European Short Course Championships in Debrecen, he set a new personal best and finished second in the semifinals with a time of 58.60, but finished placed fifth in the final.

Dale Oen won the gold medal in the 100 m breaststroke, setting a new European record with a time of 59.76, and the silver medal in the 50 m and 200 m breaststroke at the 2008 European Championships in Eindhoven. He won the silver medal in the 100 m breastroke event at the 2008 Summer Olympics in Beijing, earning Norway's first ever Olympic medal in swimming and setting new Olympic records during the qualification heats and semifinals.

In 2010, Dale Oen successfully defended his European title in the 100 m breaststroke and won the silver medal in the 200 m breaststroke at the 2010 European Championships in Budapest. During the 2011 World Championships in Shanghai, he won the gold medal in the 100 m breaststroke and set a new Nordic record with the time of 58.71. The medal was Norway's first World Championship gold medal in swimming. Dale Oen's win came three days after the Oslo attacks and he dedicated his medal to the victims of the attacks. At the 2011 European Short Course Championships in Szczecin, Dale Oen won the gold medal in the 100 m breaststroke and the bronze medal in the 50 m breaststroke.

== Personal bests ==
=== Long course (50 m) ===
Event	Time		Date	Meet	Location	Ref
50 m breaststroke	27.20	NR(†)	25 Jul 2011	World Championships	Shanghai, China	
100 m breaststroke	58.71	NR	25 Jul 2011	World Championships	Shanghai, China	
200 m breaststroke	2:09.68	NR	12 Aug 2010	European Championships	Budapest, Hungary	

Legend: WR – World record; ER – European record; NR – Norwegian record;
Records not set in finals: h – heat; sf – semifinal; r – relay 1st leg; rh – relay heat 1st leg; b – B final; † – en route to final mark; so – swim-off; tt – time trial

=== Short course (25 m) ===
Event	Time		Date	Meet	Location	Ref
50 m breaststroke	27.13	(h)	12 Apr 2008	World SC Championships	Manchester, United Kingdom	
100 m breaststroke	58.14	NR	10 Apr 2008	World SC Championships	Manchester, United Kingdom	
200 m breaststroke	2:08.28	NR	16 Dec 2007	European SC Championships	Debrecen, Hungary	
100 m individual medley	55.34		20 Apr 2008	Norwegian SC Championships	Stavanger, Norway	

Legend: WR – World record; ER – European record; NR – Norwegian record;
Records not set in finals: h – heat; sf – semifinal; r – relay 1st leg; rh – relay heat 1st leg; b – B final; † – en route to final mark; so – swim-off; tt – time trial

== Death and tributes ==
On 30 April 2012, Dale Oen collapsed in the shower during a training camp in Flagstaff, Arizona. He was found by teammates who began administering CPR until paramedics arrived. Dale Oen was transferred to a hospital, but pronounced dead on arrival, aged 26. Following his death, tributes were made by friends and swimming rivals Cameron van der Burgh of South Africa and Kosuke Kitajima of Japan. An initial autopsy was inconclusive, but a second revealed that Dale Oen suffered from severe atherosclerotic coronary artery disease, with the three main coronary arteries feeding his myocardium up to 90 percent occluded by atherosclerotic plaque, as well as an enlarged heart, and that he died of a myocardial infarction. The autopsy also revealed that Dale Oen had suffered a series of small heart attacks in the months prior to his death, which went unrecognized. He had experienced pain that radiated down his arm, and into his shoulder, face and chest, but this was attributed to a shoulder injury and a pinched nerve. The only conventional risk factors Dale Oen had for heart disease were a "slightly elevated cholesterol level" and the fact that his grandfather died suddenly at 42, of an unknown cause. Dale Oen's funeral was held on 11 May 2012, in Øygarden Municipality, Norway.

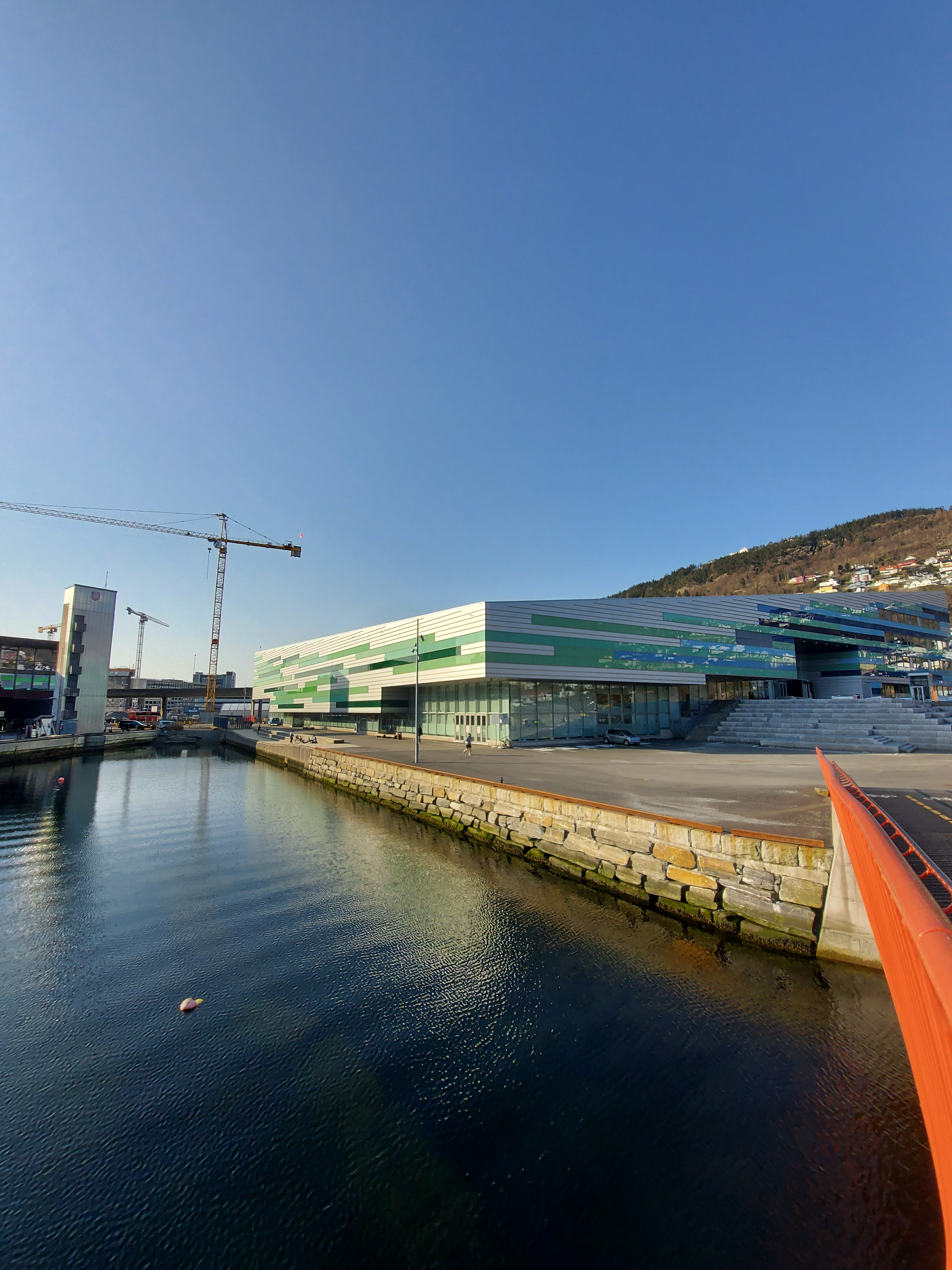
The AdO arena, Bergen

Italian swimmer Fabio Scozzoli dedicated his gold medal in the 100 m breaststroke at the 2012 European Championships to Dale Oen. At the 2012 Summer Olympics in London, van der Burgh and Hungarian swimmer Dániel Gyurta, who won the men's 100 m breaststroke and the men's 200 m breaststroke respectively and both set new world records, dedicated their swims and medals to Dale Oen due to their close friendship with the Norwegian. Gyurta originally intended to gift a copy of his gold medal to Dale Oen's family, but due to the rules of the International Olympic Committee forbidding replicas of Olympic medals, he later gifted a special medal to the family and held a speech in Norwegian during the Norwegian Sports Gala in order to honor their friendship. The new public swimming pool in Bergen that opened in 2014 was named Alexander Dale Oen Arena (AdO Arena) in his honour.

Among others, then-Norwegian prime minister Erna Solberg held a speech at the opening of the pool, naming Dale Oen as "perhaps the greatest athlete of the country." In May 2015, a statue of Dale Oen made by sculptor Arne Mæland was unveiled at the Coastal Museum in Øygarden. The unveiling was attended by a crowd of one thousand people, which included then-Mayor of Bergen Trude Drevland, and Gyurta, who placed a flower wreath on behalf of the international swimming community.

Awards
Preceded by Camille Lacourt	European Swimmer of the Year; 2011	Succeeded by Yannick Agnel
Preceded by Thor Hushovd	Norwegian Sportsperson of the Year; 2011	Succeeded by Tora Berger
