= Ian Powell (swimmer) =

British competitive swimmer (born 1985)

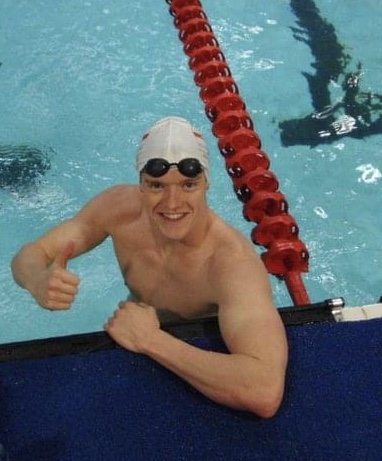
- Powell warming up for the Delhi 2010 Commonwealth Games

Personal information
- Full name: Ian Charles Powell
- National team: Guernsey, Channel Islands, UK
- Born: 16 December 1985 (age 40) Guernsey, United Kingdom
- Height: 5 ft 10 in (178 cm)
- Weight: 170 lb (77 kg; 12 st 2 lb)

Sport
- Sport: Swimming
- University team: Florida State University
Medal record
Men's swimming
Representing Guernsey
Island Games
Gold medal – first place	2011 Isle of Wight	50 m backstroke
Gold medal – first place	2011 Isle of Wight	100 m backstroke
Gold medal – first place	2011 Isle of Wight	200 m backstroke
Gold medal – first place	2011 Isle of Wight	100 m butterfly
Gold medal – first place	2011 Isle of Wight	200 m butterfly
Gold medal – first place	2011 Isle of Wight	4×50 m medley
Gold medal – first place	2011 Isle of Wight	4×100 m medley
Silver medal – second place	2011 Isle of Wight	50 m butterfly
Silver medal – second place	2011 Isle of Wight	4×50 m freestyle
Silver medal – second place	2011 Isle of Wight	4×100 m freestyle

Ian Charles Powell (born 16 December 1985) is a former British competitive swimmer and was inducted as 21st Sporting Hero of the Sporting Hall of Fame in Guernsey (Channel Islands). Powell specialized in butterfly and backstroke and his best finish was a third place at the British Swimming Championships in 2009 finishing in a time of 1.58.66 seconds to set a new Guernsey record for the event.

== Charity work ==
In 2011, Powell was invited as the official Ambassador for the Skipton Swimarathon to work with sponsors Skipton International in order to help communicate the benefits of swimming and encourage people to sign up and raise funds for local good causes.

== Personal life ==
Powell is currently living in the San Francisco Bay Area in the United States and swims at the Walnut Creek Masters swim team.
