= 2018 FINA World Swimming Championships (25 m) – Men's 400 metre freestyle =

Men's 400 metre freestyle at the 2018 FINA World Swimming Championships (25 m)
- Venue: Hangzhou Sports Park Stadium
- Dates: 11 December (heats and final)
- Competitors: 41 from 37 nations
- Winning time: 3:34.01

Medalists
gold medal	Danas Rapšys	Lithuania
silver medal	Henrik Christiansen	Norway
bronze medal	Gabriele Detti	Italy

The Men's 400 metre freestyle competition of the 2018 FINA World Swimming Championships (25 m) were held on 11 December 2018.

== Records ==
Prior to the competition, the existing world and championship records were as follows.

	Name	Nation	Time	Location	Date
World record	Yannick Agnel	France	3:32.25	Angers	15 November 2012
Championship record	Péter Bernek	Hungary	3:34.32	Doha	5 December 2014

The following records were established during the competition:

Date	Event	Name	Nation	Time	Record
11 December	Final	Danas Rapšys	Lithuania	3:34.01	CR

== Results ==
=== Heats ===
The heats were started at 09:30.

Rank	Heat	Lane	Name	Nationality	Time	Notes
1	3	4	Danas Rapšys	Lithuania	3:36.65	Q, NR
2	4	5	Henrik Christiansen	Norway	3:38.04	Q
3	4	6	Fernando Scheffer	Brazil	3:39.10	Q, SA
4	5	9	Zane Grothe	United States	3:39.73	Q
5	5	4	Aleksandr Krasnykh	Russia	3:39.86	Q
5	5	5	Martin Malyutin	Russia	3:39.86	Q
7	5	3	Gabriele Detti	Italy	3:39.89	Q
8	4	2	Wojciech Wojdak	Poland	3:40.36	Q
9	4	3	Ji Xinjie	China	3:40.47	
10	5	6	Matteo Ciampi	Italy	3:42.27	
11	4	7	Jan Micka	Czech Republic	3:42.31	
12	5	8	David Aubry	France	3:42.62	
13	3	2	Marcelo Acosta	El Salvador	3:42.74	NR
14	4	9	Marwan Elkamash	Egypt	3:43.26	NR
15	4	4	Péter Bernek	Hungary	3:43.74	
16	5	7	Velimir Stjepanović	Serbia	3:44.16	
17	5	1	Miguel Nascimento	Portugal	3:44.79	
18	4	0	Richard Nagy	Slovakia	3:45.22	
19	3	8	Ahmed Hafnaoui	Tunisia	3:45.98	
20	2	5	Wang Hsing-hao	Chinese Taipei	3:46.05	NR
21	3	0	Yordan Yanchev	Bulgaria	3:46.13	
22	2	4	Nguyễn Hữu Kim Sơn	Vietnam	3:46.14	NR
23	5	0	Dániel Dudás	Hungary	3:46.65	
24	4	8	Fuyu Yoshida	Japan	3:46.96	
25	3	1	Pit Brandenburger	Luxembourg	3:46.97	
26	3	5	Alexander Trampitsch	Austria	3:47.71	
27	4	1	Adam Paulsson	Sweden	3:47.84	
28	3	9	Igor Mogne	Mozambique	3:48.76	
29	5	2	Qiu Ziao	China	3:50.58	
30	2	3	Irakli Revishvili	Georgia	3:51.86	
31	3	3	Oli Mortensen	Faroe Islands	3:53.25	
32	3	7	Siwat Matangkapong	Thailand	3:55.67	
33	3	6	Matthew Hyde	New Zealand	3:56.14	
34	1	5	Cristian Santi	San Marino	4:00.66	
35	2	2	Amadou Ndiaye	Senegal	4:00.92	NR
36	2	1	Ardi Zulhilmi Mohamed Azman	Singapore	4:04.28	
37	2	7	Andrej Stojanoski	Macedonia	4:05.12	
38	1	3	Amir Abbas Amrollahi Biuoki	Iran	4:05.76	NR
39	2	8	Spiro Goga	Albania	4:06.92	
40	2	6	Stefano Mitchell	Antigua and Barbuda	4:06.94	
41	1	4	Vadym Semkiv	Sint Maarten	4:37.35	

=== Final ===
The final was held at 19:00.

Rank	Lane	Name	Nationality	Time	Notes
1st place, gold medalist(s)	4	Danas Rapšys	Lithuania	3:34.01	CR, NR
2nd place, silver medalist(s)	5	Henrik Christiansen	Norway	3:36.64	NR
3rd place, bronze medalist(s)	1	Gabriele Detti	Italy	3:37.54	
4	7	Martin Malyutin	Russia	3:37.75	
5	2	Aleksandr Krasnykh	Russia	3:37.97	
6	6	Zane Grothe	United States	3:38.99	
7	8	Wojciech Wojdak	Poland	3:39.22	
8	3	Fernando Scheffer	Brazil	3:39.40	
