= Fuyu Yoshida =

Japanese swimmer

Personal information
- Nationality: Japanese
- Born: 23 November 1997 (age 28)

Sport
- Sport: Swimming
Medal record
Men's swimming
Representing Japan
Junior Pan Pacific Championships
Silver medal – second place	2014 Maui	4×200 m freestyle

Fuyu Yoshida (Japanese: 吉田 冬優; born 23 November 1997) is a Japanese swimmer. He competed in the men's 200 metre freestyle event at the 2018 FINA World Swimming Championships (25 m), in Hangzhou, China.
