= Daniel Dudas =

Hungarian swimmer

Personal information
- Nationality: Hungarian
- Born: 20 April 1994 (age 32)

Sport
- Sport: Swimming

Daniel Dudas (born 20 April 1994) is a Hungarian swimmer. He competed in the men's 200 metre freestyle event at the 2018 FINA World Swimming Championships (25 m), in Hangzhou, China.
