= List of Norwegian records in swimming =

The Norwegian records in swimming are the fastest ever performances of swimmers from Norway, which are recognised and ratified by the Norges Svømmeforbund (NSF).

All records were set in finals unless noted otherwise.

== Long Course (50 m) ==
=== Men ===
Event	Time		Name	Club	Date	Meet	Location	Ref
50m freestyle	21.94	h	Nicholas Lia	Norway	28 July 2023	World Championships	Fukuoka, Japan	
100m freestyle	48.65	h	Sander Sørensen	Norway	30 July 2025	World Championships	Singapore, Singapore	
200m freestyle	1:45.78	sf	Sander Sørensen	Norway	28 July 2025	World Championships	Singapore, Singapore	
400m freestyle	3:46.37		Henrik Christiansen	Skjetten Svømming	30 March 2016	Swim Open Stockholm	Stockholm, Sweden	
800m freestyle	7:41.28	NR	Henrik Christiansen	Norway	24 July 2019	World Championships	Gwangju, South Korea	
1500m freestyle	14:45.35	NR	Henrik Christiansen	Norway	28 July 2019	World Championships	Gwangju, South Korea	
50m backstroke	24.84		Lavrans Solli	Norway	9 August 2015	World Championships	Kazan, Russia	
100m backstroke	54.46		Markus Lie	OI Svomming	10 June 2023	Aquarama Open	Kristiansand, Norway	
200m backstroke	1:59.23	h	Lavrans Solli	Norway	6 August 2015	World Championships	Kazan, Russia	
50m breaststroke	27.20	†, =	Alexander Dale Oen	Norway	25 July 2011	World Championships	Shanghai, China	
50m breaststroke	27.20	=	André Grindheim	Hamar IL	3 July 2021	Norwegian Championships	Bergen, Norway	
100m breaststroke	58.71	NR	Alexander Dale Oen	Norway	25 July 2011	World Championships	Shanghai, China	
200m breaststroke	2:09.68		Alexander Dale Oen	Norway	12 August 2010	European Championships	Budapest, Hungary	
50m butterfly	23.18	h	Nicolas Lia	Norway	11 February 2024	World Championships	Doha, Qatar	
100m butterfly	52.22	h	Tomoe Hvas	Norway	29 July 2021	Olympic Games	Tokyo, Japan	
200m butterfly	1:56.30	h	Tomoe Hvas	Norway	26 July 2021	Olympic Games	Tokyo, Japan	
200m individual medley	1:57.64	h, NR	Tomoe Hvas	Norway	28 July 2021	Olympic Games	Tokyo, Japan	
400m individual medley	4:17.49		Jon Joentvedt	Bryne SK	21 April 2023	Bergen Swim Festival	Bergen, Norway	
4×100m freestyle relay	3:14.45		Sander Sørensen (49.07); Elias Refstie (48.11); Jakob Harlem (48.31); Bjoernar Laskerud (48.96)	Norway	13 August 2026	European Championships	Paris, France	
4×200m freestyle relay	7:21.52	h	Sander Sørensen (1:48.31); Oskar Farkas (1:50.32); Birk Lee Johansen (1:52.18); Henrik Christiansen (1:50.71)	Norway	10 August 2026	European Championships	Paris, France	
4×100m medley relay	3:38.52	h	Markus Lie (55.68); André Grindheim (1:00.36); Tomoe Hvas (52.98); Nicholas Lia (49.50)	Norway	23 May 2021	European Championships	Budapest, Hungary	

Legend: # – Record awaiting ratification by NSF; WR – World record; ER – European record; NR – Nordic record; e – equalled existing record;
Records not set in finals: h – heat; sf – semifinal; r – relay 1st leg; rh – relay heat 1st leg; b – B final; † – en route to final mark; so – swim-off; tt – time trial

=== Women ===
Event	Time		Name	Club	Date	Meet	Location	Ref
50m freestyle	25.05	h	Susann Bjørnsen	Norway	12 August 2016	Olympic Games	Rio de Janeiro, Brazil	
100m freestyle	55.32		Hedda Øritsland	Asker SK	5 July 2026	Norwegian Championships	Oslo, Norway	
200m freestyle	1:59.42		Cecilie Johannessen	Bergens SC	30 May 2015	Swim Festival	Bergen, Norway	
400m freestyle	4:11.51		Irene Dalby	Norway	17 August 1989	European Championships	Bonn, West Germany	
800m freestyle	8:28.59		Irene Dalby	Norway	19 August 1989	European Championships	Bonn, West Germany	
1500m freestyle	16:30.08	h	Hanne Naess	Norway	13 August 2026	European Championships	Paris, France	
50m backstroke	28.05	h	Ingeborg Løyning	Norway	18 May 2021	European Championships	Budapest, Hungary	
100m backstroke	1:00.00		Ingeborg Løyning	Norway	26 June 2021	Sette Colli Trophy	Rome, Italy	
200m backstroke	2:11.68	h	Ingeborg Løyning	Norway	29 July 2021	Olympic Games	Tokyo, Japan	
50m breaststroke	30.48	h, so	Silje Slyngstadli	Norway	2 August 2025	World Championships	Singapore, Singapore	
100m breaststroke	1:07.53		Silje Slyngstadli	Bergensvømmerne	6 April 2025	Bergen Swim Festival	Bergen, Norway	
200m breaststroke	2:23.02		Sara Nordenstam	Norway	15 August 2008	Olympic Games	Beijing, China	
50m butterfly	25.53	sf	Ingvild Snildal	Norway	31 July 2009	World Championships	Rome, Italy	
100m butterfly	56.96		Ingvild Snildal	Norway	27 July 2009	World Championships	Rome, Italy	
200m butterfly	2:10.99	h	Ingvild Snildal	Norway	31 July 2012	Olympic Games	London, Great Britain	
200m individual medley	2:15.13	h	Sara Nordenstam	Norway	11 August 2008	Olympic Games	Beijing, China	
400m individual medley	4:40.28	h	Sara Nordenstam	Norway	9 August 2008	Olympic Games	Beijing, China	
4×100m freestyle relay	3:44.09	h	Henriette Brekke (56.56); Cecilie Johannessen (55.84); Monica Johannessen (56.25); Ingvild Snildal (55.44)	Norway	21 May 2012	European Championships	Debrecen, Hungary	
4×200m freestyle relay	8:16.16		Annika Winsnes (2:00.71); Stine Lise Stenseth (2:03.15); Maria Thompson Clausen (2:06.72); Emilie Nyenget Løvberg (2:05.58)	Bærumsvømmerne	16 July 2016	Norwegian Championships	Kristiansand, Norway	
4×100m medley relay	4:05.49	h	Ingeborg Løyning (1:01.16); Silje Slyngstadli (1:08.77); Sandra Maria Balto (59.53); Hedda Øritsland (56.03)	Norway	16 August 2026	European Championships	Paris, France	

Legend: # – Record awaiting ratification by NSF; WR – World record; ER – European record; e – equalled existing record;
Records not set in finals: h – heat; sf – semifinal; r – relay 1st leg; rh – relay heat 1st leg; b – B final; † – en route to final mark; so – swim-off; tt – time trial

=== Mixed relay ===
Event	Time		Name	Club	Date	Meet	Location	Ref
4×100 m freestyle relay	3:31.80	h	Sander Sørensen (49.49); Elias Refstie (49.38); Hedda Øritsland (55.76); Sandra Maria Balto (57.17)	Norway	14 August 2026	European Championships	Paris, France	
4×100 m medley relay	3:49.45	h	Ingeborg Løyning (1:00.52); Charlie Egeland (1:00.47); Elias Klev (52.66); Hedda Øritsland (55.80)	Norway	11 August 2026	European Championships	Paris, France	

Legend: # – Record awaiting ratification by NSF; WR – World record; ER – European record; e – equalled existing record;
Records not set in finals: h – heat; so – swim-off

== Short Course (25 m) ==
=== Men ===
Event	Time		Name	Club	Date	Meet	Location	Ref
50m freestyle	21.14		Nicholas Lia	OI Svomming	27 October 2023	North Sea Meet	Stavanger, Norway	
100m freestyle	46.55	sf	Sander Sørensen	Norway	5 December 2025	European Championships	Lublin, Poland	
200m freestyle	1:41.87	h	Sander Sørensen	Norway	3 December 2025	European Championships	Lublin, Poland	
400m freestyle	3:36.64	NR	Henrik Christiansen	Norway	11 December 2018	World Championships	Hangzhou, China	
800m freestyle	7:25.78	NR	Henrik Christiansen	Norway	21 November 2020	ISL Test Event	Budapest, Hungary	
1500m freestyle	14:18.15	NR	Henrik Christiansen	Norway	6 December 2019	European Championships	Glasgow, Great Britain	
50m backstroke	23.33	sf, NR	Lavrans Solli	Norway	5 December 2014	World Championships	Doha, Qatar	
100m backstroke	50.67	sf, NR	Markus Lie	Norway	13 December 2022	World Championships	Melbourne, Australia	
200m backstroke	1:53.39		Markus Lie	OI Svomming	16 November 2023	Norwegian Championships	Bergen, Norway	
50m breaststroke	26.18	=	Nicholas Lia	OI Svomming	16 November 2023	Norwegian Championships	Bergen, Norway	
50m breaststroke	26.18	=	Joergen Brathen	Norway	7 December 2025	European Championships	Lublin, Poland	
100m breaststroke	57.05		Alexander Dale Oen	Norway	9 December 2011	European Championships	Szczecin, Poland	
200m breaststroke	2:06.15		Alexander Dale Oen	Norway	11 December 2011	European Championships	Szczecin, Poland	
50m butterfly	22.56	sf, NR	Nicholas Lia	Norway	5 November 2021	European Championships	Kazan, Russia	
100m butterfly	49.22	sf, NR	Tomoe Hvas	Norway	2 November 2021	European Championships	Kazan, Russia	
200m butterfly	1:50.62	NR	Tomoe Hvas	LA Current	19 September 2021	International Swimming League	Naples, Italy	
100m individual medley	51.35	NR	Tomoe Hvas	Norway	19 December 2021	World Championships	Abu Dhabi, United Arab Emirates	
200m individual medley	1:51.74	NR	Tomoe Hvas	Norway	6 December 2019	European Championships	Glasgow, Great Britain	
400m individual medley	4:02.85	NR	Tomoe Hvas	LA Current	10 September 2021	International Swimming League	Naples, Italy	
4×50m freestyle relay	1:25.36	h	Bjoernar Laskerud (21.64); Elias Refstie (20.83); Jakob Harlem (21.00); Markus Lie (21.89)	Norway	2 December 2025	European Championships	Lublin, Poland	
4×100m freestyle relay	3:12.54		Elias Nordeng Refstie (49.02); Nicholas Lia (47.26); Christian Groth Dyrkorn (47.87); Simon Moe (48.39)	Bærumsvømmerne	18 November 2022	Norwegian Championships	Stavanger, Norway	
4×200m freestyle relay	7:01.03	h	Tomoe Hvas (1:44.18); Markus Lie (1:44.96); Henrik Christiansen (1:45.56); Jon Joentvedt (1:46.33)	Norway	19 December 2021	World Championships	Abu Dhabi, United Arab Emirates	
4×50m medley relay	1:33.44	h, NR	Markus Lie (23.70); Joergen Brathen (26.20); Tomoe Hvas (22.41); Niksa Stojkovski (21.13)	Norway	8 December 2019	European Championships	Glasgow, Great Britain	
4×100m medley relay	3:25.63	NR	Markus Lie (51.00); André Grindheim (57.73); Tomoe Hvas (49.96); Nicholas Lia (46.94)	Norway	21 December 2021	World Championships	Abu Dhabi, United Arab Emirates	

Legend: # – Record awaiting ratification by NSF; WR – World record; ER – European record; NR – Nordic record; e – equalled existing record;
Records not set in finals: h – heat; sf – semifinal; r – relay 1st leg; rh – relay heat 1st leg; b – B final; † – en route to final mark; so – swim-off; tt – time trial

=== Women ===
Event	Time		Name	Club	Date	Meet	Location	Ref
50m freestyle	24.37	=	Susann Bjørnsen	Norway	3 November 2017	North Sea Meet	Kristiansand, Norway	
50m freestyle	24.37	r, =	Susann Bjørnsen	Norway	15 December 2017	European Championships	Copenhagen, Denmark	
100m freestyle	52.92	sf	Ingvild Snildal	Norway	10 December 2009	European Championships	Istanbul, Turkey	
200m freestyle	1:55.95		Cecilie Waage Johannessen	Norway	11 December 2011	European Championships	Szczecin, Poland	
400m freestyle	4:03.18		Bea Novda	Stavanger SK	13 November 2025	Norwegian Championships	Holmen, Norway	
800m freestyle	8:22.27		Bea Novda	Stavanger SK	17 October 2026	Asker Grand Prix	Holmen, Norway	
1500m freestyle	15:56.87		Bea Novda	Stavanger SK	23 October 2026	North Sea Meet	Stavanger, Norway	
50m backstroke	26.47	=	Ingeborg Løyning	Bærumsvømmerne	30 October 2020	North Sea Meet	Stavanger, Norway	
50m backstroke	26.47	=	Ingeborg Løyning	Iron	25 September 2021	International Swimming League	Naples, Italy	
100m backstroke	57.15	r	Ingeborg Løyning	Iron	25 September 2021	International Swimming League	Naples, Italy	
200m backstroke	2:03.67		Ingeborg Løyning	Iron	25 September 2021	International Swimming League	Naples, Italy	
50m breaststroke	29.85	sf	Silje Slyngstadli	Norway	9 December 2023	European Championships	Otopeni, Romania	
100m breaststroke	1:05.26		Katharina Stiberg	Norway	13 December 2009	European Championships	Istanbul, Turkey	
200m breaststroke	2:22.10	sf	Stina Colleou	Norway	4 November 2021	European Championships	Kazan, Russia	
50m butterfly	25.10		Ingvild Snildal	Norway	11 December 2009	European Championships	Istanbul, Turkey	
100m butterfly	56.52		Ingvild Snildal	Norway	14 November 2009	World Cup	Berlin, Germany	
200m butterfly	2:08.36		Ingvild Snildal	Asker SK	25 March 2012	Norwegian Championships	Drammen, Norway	
100m individual medley	59.12	h	Katharina Stiberg	Norway	11 December 2009	European Championships	Istanbul, Turkey	
200m individual medley	2:10.66		Malene Rypestøl	Norway	5 December 2021	Nordic Championships	Upplands Väsby, Sweden	
400m individual medley	4:39.84	h	Sara Nordenstam	Norway	15 December 2010	World Championships	Dubai, United Arab Emirates	
4×50m freestyle relay	1:38.68		Susann Bjørnsen (24.37); Monika Johannessen (24.56); Marte Løvberg (24.81); Emilie Løvberg (24.94)	Norway	15 December 2017	European Championships	Copenhagen, Denmark	
4×100m freestyle relay	3:40.45	h	Ingvild Snildal (55.11); Cecilie Waage Johannessen (54.34); Monica Waage Johannessen (55.96); Henriette Brekke (55.04)	Norway	18 December 2010	World Championships	Dubai, United Arab Emirates	
4×200m freestyle relay	8:03.16		Stine Lise Stenseth (2:00.17); Hedda Oeritsland (2:02.43); Majken Antonie Smith (2:01.72); Emilie Loevberg (1:58.85)	Bærumsvømmerne	15 March 2018	Norwegian Championships	Nadderud, Norway	
4×50m medley relay	1:46.84	h	Susanne Steinnes (27.53); Frida Stretere Loebersli (29.44); Hedda Oritsland (25.27); Mari Moen (24.60)	Norway	7 December 2025	European Championships	Lublin, Poland	
4×100m medley relay	4:01.15	h	Katharina Stiberg (1:01.32); Sara Nordenstam (1:08.31); Ingvild Snildal (57.79); Cecilie Waage Johannessen (53.73)	Norway	17 December 2010	World Championships	Dubai, United Arab Emirates	

Legend: # – Record awaiting ratification by NSF; WR – World record; ER – European record; e – equalled existing record;
Records not set in finals: h – heat; sf – semifinal; r – relay 1st leg; rh – relay heat 1st leg; b – B final; † – en route to final mark; so – swim-off; tt – time trial

=== Mixed relay ===
Event	Time		Name	Club	Date	Meet	Location	Ref
4×50 m freestyle relay	1:30.89	h	Bjoernar Laskerud (21.28); Nicholas Lia (21.17); Mari Moen (24.02); Hedda Oritsland (24.42)	Norway	13 December 2024	World Championships	Budapest, Hungary	
4×50 m medley relay	1:38.95		Ingeborg Løyning (27.16); Christoffer Haarsaker (26.12); Jenny Halden (24.99); Nicholas Lia (20.68)	Norway	7 November 2021	European Championships	Kazan, Russia	

Legend: # – Record awaiting ratification by NSF; e – equalled existing record;
Records not set in finals: h – heat; so – swim-off
