= Magnus Jákupsson =

Faroese professional swimmer (born 1994)

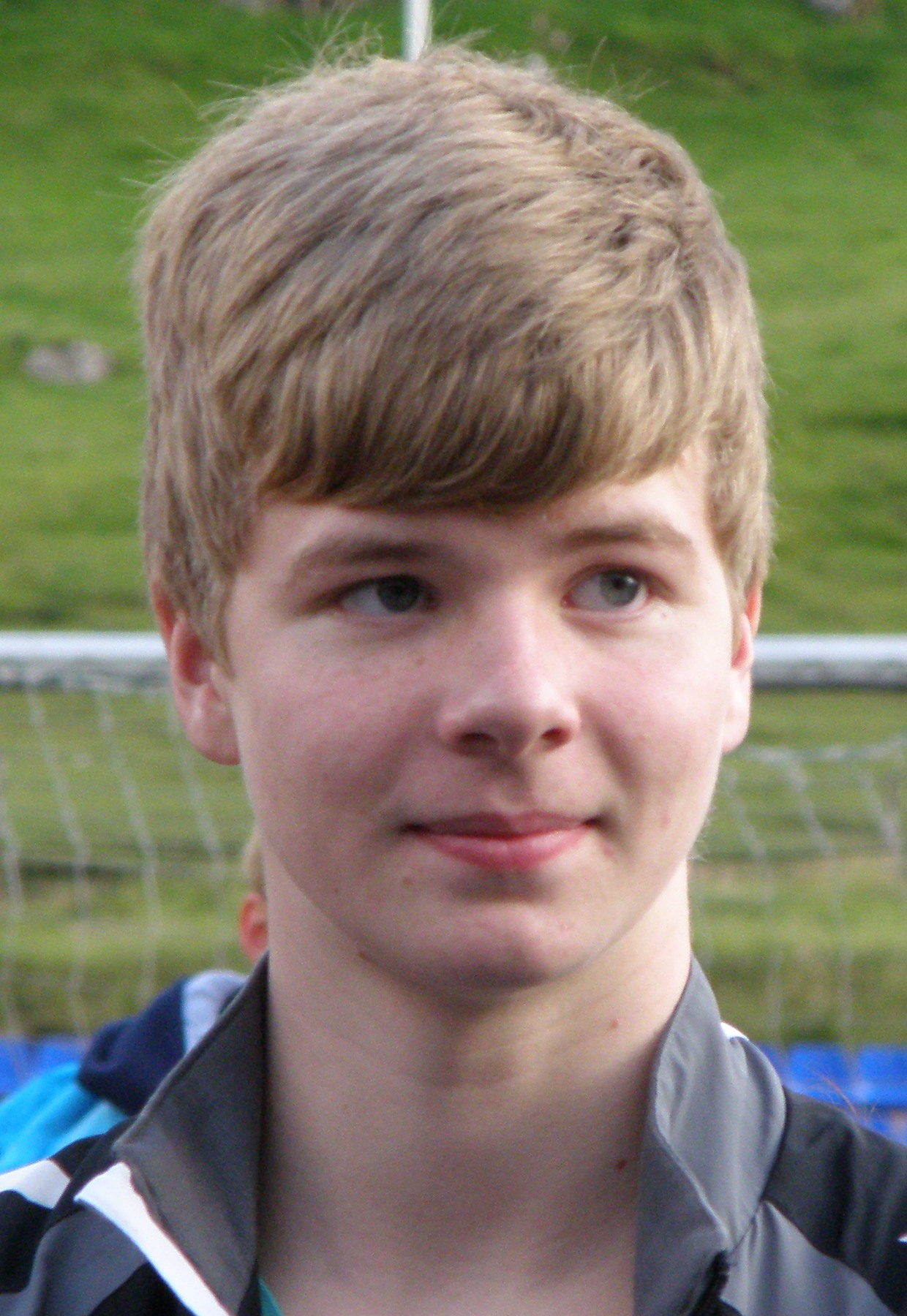

Personal information
- Nationality: Until 2012 Faroese (Note: There is no "Faroese nationality, because the Faroe Islands is not a state but a self-governing country within the Danish Kingdom. There is however a Faroese "swimming-nationality": swimmers can represent the Faroe Islands in all competitions except for the Olympics) since 2013 Danish
- Born: 8 September 1994 (age 32) Tórshavn, Faroe Islands

Sport
- Sport: Swimming
- Strokes: Backstroke, medley, butterfly
- Club: Farum Svømmeklub
Medal record
Island Games
Gold medal – first place	2011 Isle of Wight	50 m butterfly
Gold medal – first place	2011 Isle of Wight	4x50 m freestyle
Gold medal – first place	2011 Isle of Wight	4x100 m freestyle
Silver medal – second place	2011 Isle of Wight	50 m backstroke
Silver medal – second place	2011 Isle of Wight	100 m backstroke
Silver medal – second place	2011 Isle of Wight	200 m backstroke
Silver medal – second place	2011 Isle of Wight	4x50 m medley
Silver medal – second place	2011 Isle of Wight	4x100 m medley
Bronze medal – third place	2011 Isle of Wight	100 m butterfly

Magnus Jákupsson (born 8 September 1994) is a professional swimmer who swam for the Faroe Islands until 2012 and for Denmark since 2013. He is also swimming for Farum Svømmeklub since March 2015. Earlier he swam for the Danish clubs SIGMA Nordsjælland and Vestegnens Aqua Team (VAT) and for the Faroese club Havnar Svimjifelag. Until 2012 he held several Faroese records, he holds the second most Faroese men's swimming records, after Pál Joensen. His Faroese records are in backstroke, individual medley and butterfly. He moved to Denmark in 2011, and the following year he changed his swimming nationality to Danish. After that he can only set Danish records, not Faroese, and he can only represent Denmark in swimming competitions. Until he changed swimming nationality he was the record holder of six individual Faroese records on short course and eight individual Faroese records on long course.

In October 2013 Jákupsson was selected for the Great Danes project, and the year after, in November 2014, he was selected for the Danish senior national team for men, named The Vikings.

In 2015 he broke the Danish record in 50 metre backstroke on short course at the 2015 European Short Course Swimming Championships in Netanya, Israel with the time 23.84. On 24 January 2016 he tied the long course Danish record in the same event, set by Mathias Gydesen in 2010. Jákupsson broke the record at the Flanders Speedo Cup where he won the gold medal. He is currently one of the best Danish male swimmers.

== Swimming results ==
=== 2011 Faroese Championships ===
Magnus Jákupsson was the second most winning swimmer at the 2011 Faroese Championships in Tórshavn in May 2011. He won 11 gold and one bronze medal, Pál Joensen won most medals: 11 gold and three silver.

=== 2011 European Junior Championship in Belgrade ===
Jákupsson competed at the 2011 European Junior Swimming Championships from 6 to 10 July 2011 in Belgrade, Serbia. His best result was number 10 in the 50 metre backstroke. He broke Faroese records and junior records in all six events he competed in.

- Number 10 in 50m backstroke with the time 26.76 (Faroese record and junior record)
- Number 13 in 50m butterfly with the time 24.96 (Faroese record and junior record)
- Number 24 in 100m butterfly with the time 56.20 (Faroese record and junior record)
- Number 26 in 50m freestyle with the time 23.90 (Faroese record and junior record)
- Number 26 in 200m backstroke with the time 2:08.88 (Faroese record and junior record)
- Number 28 in 100m backstroke with the time 58.51 (Faroese record and junior record)

=== 2011 Island Games ===
Magnus Jákupsson competed one time at the Islands Games for the Faroe Islands, before his change of nationality. He won 3 gold, 5 silver and one bronze medalal at the Island Games on the Isle of Wight in July 2011. His results:

- Gold in 50m butterfly with the time 24.79
- Gold in 4x50m freestyle with the time 1:33.59 (together with Pál Joensen, Pauli Øssursson Mohr og Heðin Lisberg Olsen)
- Gold in 4 × 100 m freestyle with the time 3:23.10 (together with Pál Joensen, Pauli Øssursson Mohr og Heðin Lisberg Olsen)
- Silver in 100m backstroke with the time 54.74
- Silver in 200m backstroke with the time 2:00.86
- Silver in 4 × 100 m medley with the time 3:47.81 (together with Pál Joensen, Pauli Øssursson Mohr og Heðin Lisberg Olsen)
- Silver in 4x50m medley with the time 1:43.23 (together with Pál Joensen, Pauli Øssursson Mohr og Heðin Lisberg Olsen)
- Silver in 50m backstroke with the time 25.84
- Bronze in 100m butterfly with the time 55.95

=== 2012 Danish Open in Brønshøj ===
- Silver in 50 metre backstroke with the time 26.64, which was new Faroese record.
- Number 7 in 100 metre butterfly with the time 55.46 which was new Faroese record.

=== 2013 Danish Open ===
- Gold in 50 m backstroke with the time 25.92
- Gold in 200 m backstroke with the time 2:03.98

=== 2013 Swedish Swim Games ===
- Gold in 50 m backstroke in the time 24.64 (personal best time)
- Gold in 100 m backstroke in the time 52.63 (personal best and championship record)
- Gold in 200 m backstroke in the time 1:58.09
- Silver in 50 m butterfly in the time 24.03 (personal best)

=== 2013 Danish Championships on Short Course ===
- Gold in 50 m freestyle with the time 24.21, which was new Danish record. Andreas Schiellerup swam in the same time so they shared the gold medal and the record.
- Gold in 100 m backstroke in the time 51.75 (personal record).
- Gold in 200 m backstroke with the time 1:54.90.

=== 2013 European Short Course Championships in Herning ===
- Number 13 in 50 metre backstroke with the time 24.06, which was a new Danish record.

=== 2014 MOM Marseille ===
Magnus was selected to the 3e Meeting Open Méditerranéen in Marseille as a part of the Great Danes team. The competition was held from 7–9 March 2014.

- Gold in 100 m backstroke in the time 56.85
- Bronze in 50 m backstroke in the time 26.47

=== 2014 Danish Short Course Championships in Bellahøj ===
- Gold in 50 m butterfly with the time 24.08
- Gold in 100 m butterfly with the time 53.34
- Gold in 50 m backstroke with the time 24.86
- Gold in 100 m backstroke with the time 53.82
- Gold in 100 m medley with the time 54.57
- Bronze in 50 m freestyle with the time 22.43
- Bronze in 100 m freestyle with the time 49.66

=== 2015 Danish Short Course Championships ===
- Gold in 50 meter freestyle with the time 22.31
- Gold in 50 meter backstroke with the time 24.25
- Gold in 4x50 metre medley with Farum Guns H+ Arkitekter from Farum Swimming Club, their time was 1:38.38. Jákupsson was the first to swim, he swam in the time 24.32
- Gold in 4x100 metre freestyle with Farum Guns H+ Arkitekter from Farum Swimming Club, their time was 3:17.89

=== 2015 European Short Course Swimming Championships in Netanya ===
Magnus Jákupsson broke the Danish record two times in 50 metre backstroke at the European Short Course Swimming Championship, first in the heats with the time 24.01 and after that he improved his own record with the time 23.84. He became number 11 in the semifinale and did not make it to the final.

- Number 11 in 50 metre backstroke with the time 23.84 (Danish record)

=== 2016 Flanders Speedo Cup ===
Jákupsson competed at the Flanders Speedo Cup from 22 to 24 January 2016 with the Danish national team swimmers from the Great Danes and the Vikings.

- Gold in 50 m backstroke with the time 25.44, which was Danish and Nordic record, Magnus Jákupsson is the co-holder of the records together with Mathias Gydesen, who broke the same record in 2010.

=== 2016 Danish Open ===
- Gold in 50 m backstroke with the time 25.43, which was new Danish and Nordic record.
- Gold in 100 m backstroke with the time 55.46
