= Swimming at the 2025 Island Games =

- Venue: Kirkwall
- Dates: 14–17 July

Swimming, for the 2025 Island Games, held at Kirkwall, Orkney in July 2025. The events were held in a short course (25 m) pool.

== Men's Results ==
Event	Gold	Silver	Bronze
50 m freestyle	Joel Watterson; Isle of Man	Bartal Erlingsson Eidesgaard; Faroe Islands	Harry Robinson; Isle of Man
100 m freestyle	James Allison; Cayman Islands	Joel Watterson; Isle of Man	Bartal Erlingsson Eidesgaard; Faroe Islands
200 m freestyle	James Allison; Cayman Islands	Joel Watterson; Isle of Man	Líggjas Joensen; Faroe Islands
400 m freestyle	Líggjas Joensen; Faroe Islands	Samuel Sterry; Jersey	Ísak Dag Brisenfeldt; Faroe Islands
800 m freestyle	Líggjas Joensen; Faroe Islands	Samuel Sterry; Jersey	Silas Dam Lindberg; Faroe Islands
1500 m freestyle	Líggjas Joensen; Faroe Islands	Samuel Sterry; Jersey	Silas Dam Lindberg; Faroe Islands
50 m backstroke	Harry Robinson; Isle of Man	George Hayward; Isle of Wight	Isaac Thompson; Jersey
100 m backstroke	George Hayward; Isle of Wight	Will Sellars; Cayman Islands	Harry Robinson; Isle of Man
200 m backstroke	Isaac Thompson; Jersey	Oscar Dodds; Jersey	Will Sellars; Cayman Islands
50 m breaststroke	Filip Nowacki; Jersey	Bartal Erlingsson Eidesgaard; Faroe Islands	Alexander Turnbull; Isle of Man
100 m breaststroke	Filip Nowacki; Jersey	Bartal Erlingsson Eidesgaard; Faroe Islands	Alexander Turnbull; Isle of Man
200 m breaststroke	Filip Nowacki; Jersey	Oscar Dodds; Jersey	William Davidson; Isle of Wight
50 m butterfly	Filip Nowacki; Jersey	Harry Robinson; Isle of Man	Joel Watterson; Isle of Man
50 m butterfly	Filip Nowacki; Jersey	Harry Robinson; Isle of Man	Alfie Price; Orkney
100 m butterfly	Filip Nowacki; Jersey	Ísak Dag Brisenfeldt; Faroe Islands	Daniel Kish; Cayman Islands
200 m butterfly	Ísak Dag Brisenfeldt; Faroe Islands	Isaac Dodds; Jersey	Daniel Kish; Cayman Islands
100 m individual medley	Filip Nowacki; Jersey	Harry Robinson; Isle of Man	Isaac Dodds; Jersey
200 m individual medley	Filip Nowacki; Jersey	Ísak Dag Brisenfeldt; Faroe Islands	Isaac Dodds; Jersey
400 m individual medley	Samuel Sterry; Jersey	Isaac Dodds; Jersey	Will Sellars; Cayman Islands
4 × 50 m freestyle relay	Isle of Man; Magnus Kelly; Harry Robinson; Zachary Bellhouse; Joel Watterson; Alexander Turnbull ^{[a]}	Faroe Islands; Bartal Erlingsson Eidesgaard; Heini Mohr Askham; Líggjas Joensen; Ísak Dag Brisenfeldt; Jón Dalá Hofgaard ^{[a]}	Jersey; Filip Nowacki; Joseph Swart; Isaac Dodds; Matthew Deffains; Isaac Thompson ^{[a]} Oscar Dodds ^{[a]}
4 × 100 m freestyle relay	Isle of Man; Magnus Kelly; Zachary Bellhouse; Harry Robinson; Joel Watterson	Faroe Islands; Ísak Dag Brisenfeldt; Heini Mohr Askham; Bartal Erlingsson Eidesgaard; Líggjas Joensen; Silas Dam Lindberg ^{[a]}	Cayman Islands; James Allison; Will Sellars; Lev Fahy; Daniel Kish
4 × 50 m medley relay	Isle of Man; Harry Robinson; Alexander Turnbull; Joel Watterson; Magnus Kelly	Jersey; Isaac Thompson; Filip Nowacki; Isaac Dodds; Matthew Deffains; Oscar Dodds ^{[a]} Joseph Swart ^{[a]}	Cayman Islands; Will Sellars; Jack Clark-Terrell; Daniel Kish; James Allison; Lev Fahy ^{[a]}
4 × 100 m medley relay	Jersey; Isaac Thompson; Filip Nowacki; Isaac Dodds; Samuel Sterry; Oscar Dodds ^{[a]} Joseph Swart ^{[a]}	Faroe Islands; Bartal Erlingsson Eidesgaard; Jón Dalá Hofgaard; Ísak Dag Brisenfeldt; Líggjas Joensen; Heini Mohr Askham ^{[a]} Silas Dam Lindberg ^{[a]}	Cayman Islands; Will Sellars; Jack Clark-Terrell; Daniel Kish; James Allison; Lev Fahy ^{[a]}

== Women's Results ==
Event	Gold	Silver	Bronze
50 m freestyle	Eve Wood; Orkney	Olivia Weuro; Åland	Alisa Vestergård; Faroe Islands
100 m freestyle	Chloe Bown; Guernsey	Olivia Weuro; Åland	Alisa Vestergård; Faroe Islands
200 m freestyle	Chloe Bown; Guernsey	Alisa Vestergård; Faroe Islands	Lauren Dennett; Isle of Man
400 m freestyle	Clara Ginnis; Jersey	Orla Rabey; Guernsey	Delphine Riley; Guernsey
800 m freestyle	Clara Ginnis; Jersey	Hannah Sterry; Jersey	Delphine Riley; Guernsey
1500 m freestyle	Clara Ginnis; Jersey	Hannah Sterry; Jersey	Delphine Riley; Guernsey
50 m backstroke	Tatiana Tostevin; Guernsey	Sierrah Broadbelt; Cayman Islands	Elisabeth Erlendsdóttir; Faroe Islands
100 m backstroke	Elisabeth Erlendsdóttir; Faroe Islands	Tatiana Tostevin; Guernsey	Sierrah Broadbelt; Cayman Islands
200 m backstroke	Elisabeth Erlendsdóttir; Faroe Islands	Megan Hansford; Jersey	Elsa Dodds; Jersey
50 m breaststroke	Kara Hanlon; Western Isles	Laura Kinley; Isle of Man	Lea Osberg Højsted; Faroe Islands
100 m breaststroke	Kara Hanlon; Western Isles	Laura Kinley; Isle of Man	Chloe Bown; Guernsey
200 m breaststroke	Kara Hanlon; Western Isles	Chloe Bown; Guernsey	Asia Kent; Gibraltar
50 m butterfly	Eve Wood; Orkney	Sierrah Broadbelt; Cayman Islands	Olivia Weuro; Åland
100 m butterfly	Sierrah Broadbelt; Cayman Islands	Orla Rabey; Guernsey	Eve Wood; Orkney
200 m butterfly	Sierrah Broadbelt; Cayman Islands	Oriana Wheeler; Guernsey	Orla Rabey; Guernsey
100 m individual medley	Kara Hanlon; Western Isles	Eve Wood; Orkney	Chloe Bown; Guernsey
200 m individual medley	Chloe Bown; Guernsey	Oriana Wheeler; Guernsey	Kara Hanlon; Western Isles
400 m individual medley	Chloe Bown; Guernsey	Oriana Wheeler; Guernsey	Clara Ginnis; Jersey
4 × 50 m freestyle relay	Guernsey; Tatiana Tostevin; Molly Staples; Orla Rabey; Chloe Bown; Oriana Wheeler ^{[a]} Hannah Jones ^{[a]}	Åland Islands; Selma Nordberg; Ellen Woivalin; Jenny Ek; Olivia Weuro	Faroe Islands; Elisabeth Erlendsdóttir; Lea Osberg Højsted; Jonna Joensen; Alisa Vestergård; Bjarta Nolsøe Í Lágabø ^{[a]}
4 × 100 m freestyle relay	Guernsey; Tatiana Tostevin; Orla Rabey; Molly Staples; Chloe Bown; Tallulah-Mae Rautenbach ^{[a]} Oriana Wheeler ^{[a]}	Faroe Islands; Lea Osberg Højsted; Bjarta Nolsøe Í Lágabø; Elisabeth Erlendsdóttir; Alisa Vestergård; Jóhanna Ólavsdóttir ^{[a]}	Jersey; Megan Hansford; Bo Buckley; Clara Ginnis; Elizabeth Grant; Georgina Corrigan ^{[a]} Erin Goodbody ^{[a]}
4 × 50 m medley relay	Faroe Islands; Elisabeth Erlendsdóttir; Lea Osberg Højsted; Bjarta Nolsøe Í Lágabø; Alisa Vestergård	Guernsey; Tatiana Tostevin; Oriana Wheeler; Orla Rabey; Chloe Bown; Molly Staples ^{[a]} Hannah Jones ^{[a]}	Åland Islands; Jenny Ek; Ellen Woivalin; Olivia Weuro; Selma Nordberg; Freja Karlsson ^{[a]}
4 × 100 m medley relay	Guernsey; Tatiana Tostevin; Chloe Bown; Orla Rabey; Molly Staples; Oriana Wheeler ^{[a]} Elodie Riley ^{[a]}	Faroe Islands; Elisabeth Erlendsdóttir; Lea Osberg Højsted; Jóhanna Ólavsdóttir; Alisa Vestergård; Bjarta Nolsøe Í Lágabø ^{[a]} Jonna Joensen ^{[a]}	Jersey; Megan Hansford; Hannah Sterry; Erin Goodbody; Elizabeth Grant; Georgina Corrigan ^{[a]}

== Mixed ==
Event	Gold	Silver	Bronze
4 × 50 m freestyle relay	Cayman Islands; Daniel Kish; James Allison; Eva Oldfield; Sierrah Broadbelt	Isle of Man; Chloe Batty; Harry Robinson; Joel Watterson; Laura Kinley	Faroe Islands; Bartal Erlingsson Eidesgaard; Elisabeth Erlendsdóttir; Alisa Vestergård; Líggjas Joensen; Heini Mohr Askham ^{[a]} Lea Osberg Højsted ^{[a]}
4 × 50 m medley relay	Isle of Man; Elizabeth Curphey; Laura Kinley; Harry Robinson; Joel Watterson	Faroe Islands; Elisabeth Erlendsdóttir; Bartal Erlingsson Eidesgaard; Ísak Dag Brisenfeldt; Alisa Vestergård; Bjarta Nolsøe Í Lágabø ^{[a]} Líggjas Joensen ^{[a]}	Jersey; Megan Hansford; Filip Nowacki; Isaac Dodds; Elizabeth Grant; Matthew Deffains ^{[a]}

^{a} Swimmers who participated only in the preliminaries.
