= Susann Bjørnsen =

Norwegian swimmer (born 1993)

Personal information
- Nationality: Norwegian
- Born: 28 May 1993 (age 33) Bardu, Norway

Sport
- Sport: Swimming
Medal record
European Championships (SC)
Bronze medal – third place	2017 Copenhagen	100 m medley

Susann Bjørnsen (born 28 May 1993) is a Norwegian breaststroke, freestyle and medley swimmer.

She qualified for competing at the 2016 Summer Olympics in Rio de Janeiro.

She competed at the 2013 World Aquatics Championships in Barcelona, and at the 2014 FINA World Swimming Championships (25 m) in Qatar.
