= André Klippenberg Grindheim =

Norwegian swimmer

André Grindheim
Personal information
- Full name: André Klippenberg Grindheim
- Nationality: Norwegian
- Born: 7 April 2000 (age 26) Haugesund, Norway

Sport
- Sport: Swimming
- Club: Hamar IL

André Klippenberg Grindheim (born 7 April 2000) is a Norwegian swimmer, born in Haugesund. He qualified to represent Norway at the 2020 Summer Olympics in Tokyo 2021, competing in men's 100 metre breaststroke.
