= Nicholas Lia =

Norwegian swimmer

Personal information
- Born: 13 February 2001 (age 25) Norway

Sport
- Sport: Swimming
Medal record
Men's swimming
Representing Norway
European U-23 Championships
Silver medal – second place	2023 Dublin	50 m freestyle

Nicholas Lia (born 13 February 2001) is a Norwegian swimmer. He competed in the men's 50 metre freestyle event at the 2024 Summer Olympics.

At the 2023 Bergen Swim Festival, Lia became the first Norwegian swimmer to swim the 50 metre freestyle in under 22 seconds.
