= Markus Lie =

Norwegian swimmer

Personal information
- Nationality: Norwegian
- Born: 21 June 1995 (age 31)

Sport
- Sport: Swimming

Markus Lie (born 21 June 1995) is a Norwegian swimmer. He competed in the men's 100 metre freestyle event at the 2017 World Aquatics Championships.
