= Norwegian Swimming Federation =

Swimming governing body in Norway

Norwegian Swimming Federation Norges Svømmeforbund
- Sport: Water polo, swimming, synchronized swimming, diving
- Jurisdiction: National
- Abbreviation: NSF
- Founded: 1910
- Affiliation: World Aquatics, European Aquatics, NSFA
- Location: Oslo, Norway
- President: Cato Bratbakk

Official website
- www.svomming.no

The Norwegian Swimming Federation (Norwegian: Norges Svømmeforbund - NSF) is the national federation of swimming in Norway. The president is Cato Bratbakk and the vice-president is Linda Myrset Dønnem (2025-2028). The Norwegian Swimming Federation was founded in 1910.

The organisation was founded in 1910 and is headquartered at Ullevaal Stadium in Oslo. It regulates all swimming sports, including diving, water polo and synchronised swimming, trains instructors, organises swimming classes for children and adults, and issues achievement badges. It publishes a members' magazine called Norsk Svømming. It will open a new swimming centre in Bergen early in 2014, at which an elite swimming series will be based and which will include a museum of swimming.

The Norwegian Swimming Federation is an affiliate of the Norwegian Confederation of Sports, European Aquatics, World Aquatics and the Nordic Swimming Federation Association (NSFA). In 2009 it reached a new membership record at almost 50,000, after gaining 3,000 members in the previous year.

== Organisation ==
Organisation board 2025-2028

- President: Cato Bratbakk
- Vice-president: Linda Myrset Dønnem
- Board member: Rune Lilledahl
- Board member: Anne-Mari Gulbrandsen Moen
- Board member: Bjørn Wirum
- Board member: Mia Sivertsvik Henriksen
