= List of Yemeni records in swimming =

The Yemeni records in swimming are the fastest ever performances of swimmers from Yemen, which are recognized and ratified by the Yemen Swimming & Aquatics Federation.

All records were set in finals unless noted otherwise.

== Long Course (50 m) ==
=== Men ===
| Event | Time | | Name | Club | Date | Meet | Location | Ref |
|---|---|---|---|---|---|---|---|---|
| 50 m freestyle | 23.70 | h | Mokhtar Al-Yamani | - | 9 April 2021 | TYR Pro Swim Series | Mission Viejo, United States | |
| 100 m freestyle | 50.52 | h | Mokhtar Al-Yamani | Yemen | 27 July 2021 | Olympic Games | Tokyo, Japan | |
| 200 m freestyle | 1:49.87 | h | Mokhtar Al-Yamani | Yemen | 24 July 2017 | World Championships | Budapest, Hungary | |
| 400 m freestyle | 3:57.61 | h | Mokhtar Al-Yamani | Yemen | 21 August 2018 | Asian Games | Jakarta, Indonesia | |
| 800 m freestyle | | | | | | | | |
| 1500 m freestyle | | | | | | | | |
| 50 m backstroke | 34.07 | h | Ebrahim Al-Maleki | Yemen | 29 July 2017 | World Championships | Budapest, Hungary | |
| 100 m backstroke | 1:24.75 | h | Mohammed Al-Qerbi | Yemen | 26 March 2017 | World Championships | Budapest, Hungary | |
| 200 m backstroke | | | | | | | | |
| 50 m breaststroke | 34.13 | | Yusuf Marwan | Yemen | 28 August 2025 | Arab Championships | Casablanca, Morocco | |
| 100 m breaststroke | | | | | | | | |
| 200 m breaststroke | | | | | | | | |
| 50 m butterfly | 27.01 | h | Mokhtar Al-Yamani | - | 5 March 2020 | TYR Pro Swim Series | Des Moines, United States | |
| 100 m butterfly | 56.59 | h | Mokhtar Al-Yamani | - | 13 June 2019 | Counsilman Classic, | United States | |
| 200 m butterfly | 2:03.78 | h | Mokhtar Al-Yamani | - | 5 March 2020 | TYR Pro Swim Series | Des Moines, United States | |
| 200 m individual medley | | | | | | | | |
| 400 m individual medley | | | | | | | | |
| 4×100 m freestyle relay | | | | | | | | |
| 4×200 m freestyle relay | | | | | | | | |
| 4×100 m medley relay | | | | | | | | |

Legend: # – Record awaiting ratification by Yemen Swimming & Aquatics Federation; WR – World record; AS – Asian record; e – equalled existing record;
Records not set in finals: h – heat; sf – semifinal; r – relay 1st leg; rh – relay heat 1st leg; b – B final; † – en route to final mark; so – swim-off; tt – time trial

=== Women ===
| Event | Time | | Name | Club | Date | Meet | Location | Ref |
|---|---|---|---|---|---|---|---|---|
| 50 m freestyle | | | | | | | | |
| 100 m freestyle | | | | | | | | |
| 200 m freestyle | | | | | | | | |
| 400 m freestyle | | | | | | | | |
| 800 m freestyle | | | | | | | | |
| 1500 m freestyle | | | | | | | | |
| 50 m backstroke | 33.99 | h | Nooran Ba-Matraf | Yemen | 24 July 2019 | World Championships | Gwangju, South Korea | |
| 100 m backstroke | 1:12.38 | h | Nooran Ba-Matraf | Yemen | 24 July 2017 | World Championships | Budapest, Hungary | |
| 200 m backstroke | | | | | | | | |
| 50 m breaststroke | 37.74 | h, † | Nooran Ba Matraf | Yemen | 20 August 2018 | Asian Games | Jakarta, Indonesia | |
| 100 m breaststroke | 1:21.17 | h, † | Nooran Ba Matraf | Yemen | 20 August 2018 | Asian Games | Jakarta, Indonesia | |
| 200 m breaststroke | 2:53.11 | h | Nooran Ba Matraf | Yemen | 20 August 2018 | Asian Games | Jakarta, Indonesia | |
| 50 m butterfly | 33.23 | h, † | Nooran Ba Matraf | Yemen | 6 August 2016 | Olympic Games | Rio de Janeiro, Brazil | |
| 100 m butterfly | 1:11.16 | h | Nooran Ba Matraf | Yemen | 6 August 2016 | Olympic Games | Rio de Janeiro, Brazil | |
| 200 m butterfly | | | | | | | | |
| 200 m individual medley | 2:34.18 | h | Nooran Ba Matraf | Yemen | 24 August 2018 | Asian Games | Jakarta, Indonesia | |
| 400 m individual medley | | | | | | | | |
| 4×100 m freestyle relay | | | | | | | | |
| 4×200 m freestyle relay | | | | | | | | |
| 4×100 m medley relay | | | | | | | | |

Legend: # – Record awaiting ratification by Yemen Swimming & Aquatics Federation; WR – World record; AS – Asian record; e – equalled existing record;
Records not set in finals: h – heat; sf – semifinal; r – relay 1st leg; rh – relay heat 1st leg; b – B final; † – en route to final mark; so – swim-off; tt – time trial

== Short Course (25 m) ==
=== Men ===
| Event | Time | | Name | Club | Date | Meet | Location | Ref |
|---|---|---|---|---|---|---|---|---|
| 50 m freestyle | 22.61 | | Mokhtar Al-Yamani | Yemen | 26 October 2021 | Arab Championships | Abu Dhabi, United Arab Emirates | |
| 100 m freestyle | 48.18 | | Mokhtar Al-Yamani | Yemen | 27 October 2021 | Arab Championships | Abu Dhabi, United Arab Emirates | |
| 200 m freestyle | 1:46.73 | | Mokhtar Al-Yamani | Yemen | 25 October 2021 | Arab Championships | Abu Dhabi, United Arab Emirates | |
| 400 m freestyle | | | | | | | | |
| 800 m freestyle | | | | | | | | |
| 1500 m freestyle | | | | | | | | |
| 50 m backstroke | 33.61 | h | Ebrahim Al-Maleki | Yemen | 5 December 2014 | World Championships | Doha, Qatar | |
| 100 m backstroke | | | | | | | | |
| 200 m backstroke | | | | | | | | |
| 50m breaststroke | 31.24 | h | Yusuf Marwan | CN Rio Maior | 7 November 2026 | Leiria Open | Leiria, Portugal | |
| 100 m breaststroke | 1:10.10 | | Yusuf Marwan | CN Rio Maior | 24 October 2026 | Qualifying Stage – National Club Championship 3rd Division | Sines, Portugal | |
| 200 m breaststroke | 2:32.81 | | Yusuf Marwan | CN Rio Maior | 24 October 2026 | Qualifying Stage – National Club Championship 3rd Division | Sines, Portugal | |
| 50m butterfly | 30.88 | h | Yousef Al-Nehmi | Yemen | 2 July 2013 | Asian Indoor and Martial Arts Games | Incheon, South Korea | |
| 100m butterfly | 52.95 | | Mokhtar Al-Yamani | Yemen | 24 October 2021 | Arab Championships | Abu Dhabi, United Arab Emirates | |
| 200 m butterfly | | | | | | | | |
| 100 m individual medley | | | | | | | | |
| 200 m individual medley | | | | | | | | |
| 400 m individual medley | | | | | | | | |
| 4×50 m freestyle relay | | | | | | | | |
| 4×100 m freestyle relay | | | | | | | | |
| 4×200 m freestyle relay | | | | | | | | |
| 4×50 m medley relay | | | | | | | | |
| 4×100 m medley relay | | | | | | | | |

Legend: # – Record awaiting ratification by Yemen Swimming & Aquatics Federation; WR – World record; AS – Asian record; e – equalled existing record;
Records not set in finals: h – heat; sf – semifinal; r – relay 1st leg; rh – relay heat 1st leg; b – B final; † – en route to final mark; so – swim-off; tt – time trial

=== Women ===
| Event | Time | | Name | Club | Date | Meet | Location | Ref |
|---|---|---|---|---|---|---|---|---|
| 50m freestyle | | | | | | | | |
| 100 m freestyle | | | | | | | | |
| 200 m freestyle | | | | | | | | |
| 400 m freestyle | | | | | | | | |
| 800 m freestyle | | | | | | | | |
| 1500 m freestyle | | | | | | | | |
| 50m backstroke | | | | | | | | |
| 100m backstroke | | | | | | | | |
| 200m backstroke | | | | | | | | |
| 50m breaststroke | 35.84 | h, † | Nooran Ba Matraf | Yemen | 14 December 2018 | World Championships | Hangzhou, China | |
| 100m breaststroke | 1:17.08 | h | Nooran Ba Matraf | Yemen | 14 December 2018 | World Championships | Hangzhou, China | |
| 200 m breaststroke | | | | | | | | |
| 50 m butterfly | | | | | | | | |
| 100 m butterfly | | | | | | | | |
| 200 m butterfly | | | | | | | | |
| 100m individual medley | 1:08.53 | h | Nooran Ba-Matraf | Yemen | 13 December 2018 | World Championships | Hangzhou, China | |
| 200 m individual medley | | | | | | | | |
| 400 m individual medley | | | | | | | | |
| 4×50 m freestyle relay | | | | | | | | |
| 4×100 m freestyle relay | | | | | | | | |
| 4×200 m freestyle relay | | | | | | | | |
| 4×50 m medley relay | | | | | | | | |
| 4×100 m medley relay | | | | | | | | |

Legend: # – Record awaiting ratification by Yemen Swimming & Aquatics Federation; WR – World record; AS – Asian record; e – equalled existing record;
Records not set in finals: h – heat; sf – semifinal; r – relay 1st leg; rh – relay heat 1st leg; b – B final; † – en route to final mark; so – swim-off; tt – time trial
