= Swimming at the 2015 Pan American Games – Women's 100 metre butterfly =

Women's 100 metre butterfly at the 2015 Pan American Games
- Venue: CIBC Pan Am/Parapan Am Aquatics Centre and Field House
- Dates: July 16 (preliminaries and finals)
- Competitors: 21 from 16 nations
- Winning time: 57.78

Medalists
Gold medal	Kelsi Worrell	United States
Silver medal	Noemie Thomas	Canada
Bronze medal	Katerine Savard	Canada

The women's 100 metre butterfly competition of the swimming events at the 2015 Pan American Games took place on July 16 at the CIBC Pan Am/Parapan Am Aquatics Centre and Field House in Toronto, Canada. The defending Pan American Games champion was Claire Donahue of the United States.

This race consisted of two lengths of the pool, all lengths in butterfly. The top eight swimmers from the heats would qualify for the A final (where the medals would be awarded), while the next best eight swimmers would qualify for the B final.

== Records ==
Prior to this competition, the existing world and Pan American Games records were as follows:

World record	Dana Vollmer (USA)	55.98	London, United Kingdom	July 29, 2012
Pan American Games record	Claire Donahue (USA)	58.59	Guadalajara, Mexico	October 15, 2011

The following new records were set during this competition.

Date	Event	Name	Nationality	Time	Record
16 July	Heat 1	Kelsi Worrell	United States	57.24	GR

== Qualification ==
Each National Olympic Committee (NOC) was able to enter up to two entrants providing they had met the A standard (1:01.49) in the qualifying period (January 1, 2014 to May 1, 2015). NOCs were also permitted to enter one athlete providing they had met the B standard (1:05.18) in the same qualifying period. All other competing athletes were entered as universality spots.

== Schedule ==
All times are Eastern Time Zone (UTC-4).

Date	Time	Round
July 16, 2015	10:45	Heats
July 16, 2015	20:03	Final B
July 16, 2015	20:08	Final A

== Results ==
KEY:	q	Fastest non-qualifiers	Q	Qualified	GR	Games record	NR	National record	PB	Personal best	SB	Seasonal best

=== Heats ===
The first round was held on July 16.

Rank	Heat	Lane	Name	Nationality	Time	Notes
1	1	4	Kelsi Worrell	United States	57.24	QA, GR
2	3	4	Katerine Savard	Canada	58.34	QA
3	2	4	Noemie Thomas	Canada	58.61	QA
4	3	5	Daynara de Paula	Brazil	58.70	QA
5	2	5	Daiene Dias	Brazil	59.16	QA
6	3	3	Arianna Vanderpool-Wallace	Bahamas	59.33	QA
7	1	5	Gia Dalesandro	United States	59.83	QA
8	1	3	Jessica Camposano	Colombia	1:00.85	QA
9	2	6	Marie Meza	Costa Rica	1:01.01	QB
10	3	2	Ana Sofia Revilak	Mexico	1:01.25	QB
11	2	2	Isabella Paez	Venezuela	1:01.27	QB
12	1	6	Belen Diaz	Argentina	1:01.53	QB
13	1	2	McKenna DeBever	Peru	1:01.62	QB
14	3	6	Diana Luna	Mexico	1:01.85	QB
15	2	3	Carolina Colorado	Colombia	1:02.36	QB
16	2	7	Tereysa Lehnertz	Puerto Rico	1:02.43	QB
17	3	7	Sharon Bravo	Ecuador	1:03.67	
18	1	7	Trudian Patrick	Jamaica	1:04.43	
19	2	1	Dalia Torrez	Nicaragua	1:04.79	
20	3	1	Estefania Urzua	Chile	1:05.79	
21	1	1	Oreoluwa Cherebin	Grenada	1:10.05	

=== B Final ===
The B final was also held on July 16.

Rank	Lane	Name	Nationality	Time	Notes
9	5	Isabella Paez	Venezuela	1:00.79	
10	4	Ana Sofia Revilak	Mexico	1:01.16	
11	2	Diana Luna	Mexico	1:01.49	
12	3	Belen Diaz	Argentina	1:01.50	
13	7	Carolina Colorado	Colombia	1:01.81	
14	1	Tereysa Lehnertz	Puerto Rico	1:02.02	
15	6	McKenna DeBever	Peru	1:02.10	
	8	Sharon Bravo	Ecuador	DNS	

=== A Final ===
The A final was also held on July 16.

Rank	Lane	Name	Nationality	Time	Notes
1st place, gold medalist(s)	4	Kelsi Worrell	United States	57.78	
2nd place, silver medalist(s)	3	Noemie Thomas	Canada	58.00	
3rd place, bronze medalist(s)	5	Katerine Savard	Canada	58.05	
4	6	Daynara de Paula	Brazil	58.56	
5	2	Daiene Dias	Brazil	58.74	
6	7	Gia Dalesandro	United States	59.24	
7	8	Marie Meza	Costa Rica	1:00.89	
8	1	Jessica Camposano	Colombia	1:01.18	
