= 2012 FINA World Swimming Championships (25 m) – Women's 50 metre butterfly =

Women's 50m Butterfly at the 2012 Short Course Worlds
- Dates: 13 December (heats and semifinals); 14 December (final)
- Winning time: 25.14

Medalists
gold medal	Lu Ying	China
silver medal	Jiao Liuyang	China
bronze medal	Jeanette Ottesen	Denmark

The women's 50 metre butterfly event at the 11th FINA World Swimming Championships (25m) took place 13 – 14 December 2012 at the Sinan Erdem Dome.

== Records ==
Prior to this competition, the existing world and championship records were as follows.

	Name	Nation	Time	Location	Date
World record	Therese Alshammar	Sweden	24.38	Singapore	22 November 2009
Championship record	Therese Alshammar	Sweden	24.87	Dubai	17 December 2010

No new records were set during this competition.

== Results ==
=== Heats ===
Rank	Heat	Lane	Name	Time	Notes
1	9	6	Noemie It-Ting Thomas (CAN)	25.76	Q, NR
2	9	4	Christine Magnuson (USA)	25.83	Q
3	7	5	Lu Ying (CHN)	25.87	Q
4	8	4	Jeanette Ottesen (DEN)	26.02	Q
5	9	5	Silvia di Pietro (ITA)	26.05	Q
6	7	4	Aleksandra Gerasimenya (BLR)	26.06	Q
7	8	6	Anna Dowgiert (POL)	26.15	Q, NR
7	8	2	Claire Donahue (USA)	26.15	Q
9	8	1	Vanessa Mohr (RSA)	26.17	Q
10	8	5	Ilaria Bianchi (ITA)	26.20	Q
11	9	3	Louise Hansson (SWE)	26.28	Q
12	3	9	Jiao Liuyang (CHN)	26.36	Q
13	7	3	Triin Aljand (EST)	26.38	Q
14	7	7	Aleksandra Urbanczyk (POL)	26.39	Q
15	8	3	Daynara de Paula (BRA)	26.43	Q
16	7	1	Brianna Throssell (AUS)	26.54	Q
17	6	6	Nao Kobayashi (JPN)	26.58	
18	9	7	İris Rosenberger (TUR)	26.60	
19	9	2	Daria Tcvetkova (RUS)	26.62	
20	7	2	Fabienne Nadarajah (AUT)	26.66	
21	7	6	Sini Kuutamo (FIN)	26.71	
22	8	8	Sze Hang Yu (HKG)	26.73	
23	8	7	Katerine Savard (CAN)	26.74	
24	9	8	Marne Erasmus (RSA)	26.86	
25	7	8	Carolina Colorado Henao (COL)	26.90	
26	3	8	Elmira Aigaliyeva (KAZ)	27.25	
27	8	9	Kona Fujita (JPN)	27.26	
28	6	3	Sara Oliveira (POR)	27.39	
28	9	1	Rozaliya Nasretdinova (RUS)	27.39	
30	7	9	Yang Chin-Kuei (TPE)	27.44	
31	6	5	Jenjira Srisaard (THA)	27.46	
32	7	0	Denisa Smolenová (SVK)	27.49	
33	6	4	Judit Ignacio Sorribes (ESP)	27.57	
34	9	9	Mylene Ong (SIN)	27.83	
35	8	0	Danielle Villars (SUI)	27.90	
36	9	0	Ayse Ezgi Yazici (TUR)	28.04	
37	5	1	Caroline Pickering Puamau (FIJ)	28.62	
38	5	3	Marie Meza (CRC)	28.81	
39	6	0	Zabrina Holder (BAR)	29.01	
40	6	2	Nguyen Thi Kim Tuyen (VIE)	29.13	
41	6	8	Dalia Tórrez Zamora (NCA)	29.34	
42	5	4	Pooja Raghava Alva (IND)	29.43	
43	1	4	Su Rim Choe (PRK)	29.46	
44	5	2	Jessica Teixeira Vieira (MOZ)	29.56	
45	5	7	Sylvia Tanya Brulehner (KEN)	29.65	
46	6	7	Kiran Khan (PAK)	29.67	
47	2	8	Maria Jose Ribera (BOL)	29.73	
48	6	1	Anxhela Kashari (ALB)	29.79	
49	5	0	Ana Sofia Nobrega (ANG)	29.80	
50	5	9	Anahit Barseghyan (ARM)	29.84	
51	5	8	Emily Siobhan Muteti (KEN)	29.96	
52	4	6	Tegan McCarthy (PNG)	30.25	
53	4	5	Tieri Erasito (FIJ)	30.26	
54	6	9	Ann-Marie Hepler (MHL)	30.35	
55	4	4	Ana Joselina Fortin (HON)	30.61	
56	3	3	Kathleen Grace Noble (UGA)	30.80	
57	4	8	Sabine Hazboun (PLE)	30.81	
58	3	0	Estellah Fils Rabetsara (MAD)	30.99	
59	4	1	Judith Ilan Meauri (PNG)	31.00	
60	4	3	Faith Edorodion (NGR)	31.02	
61	2	4	K. Zin Win (MYA)	31.32	
62	5	6	Oreoluwa Cherebin (GRN)	31.37	
63	1	3	Deandra Van der Colff (BOT)	31.46	
64	4	7	Felicity Passon (SEY)	31.49	
65	4	0	Afsana Ismayilova (AZE)	31.62	
66	2	6	Najma Khatun (BAN)	31.90	
67	4	9	Charissa Sofia Panuve (TGA)	32.29	
68	2	5	Angela Kendrick (MHL)	32.59	
69	2	2	Dirngulbai Misech (PLW)	33.13	
70	3	4	Surennyam Erdenebileg (MGL)	33.21	
71	3	2	Shne Joachim (VIN)	33.92	
72	1	6	Alphonsine Agahozo (RWA)	34.76	
73	3	5	Kibong Tanji (CMR)	35.03	
74	3	6	Danielle Atoigue (GUM)	36.29	
75	3	7	Amanda Poppe (GUM)	36.78	
76	3	1	Aminath Shajan (MDV)	36.90	
77	2	3	Adzo Kpossi (TOG)	43.00	
78	2	7	Khahliso Caroline Mpeta (LES)	46.64	
79	1	5	Daphne Ines Tchamsi (TOG)	54.54	
	2	0	Wendy Rodriguez (VEN)	DNS	
	2	1	Jeserik Pinto (VEN)	DNS	
	4	2	Ophelia Swayne (GHA)	DNS	
	5	5	Oriele Espinoza (PER)	DNS	

=== Semifinals ===
Rank	Heat	Lane	Name	Nationality	Time	Notes
1	1	5	Jeanette Ottesen	Denmark	25.62	Q
2	1	4	Christine Magnuson	United States	25.65	Q
2	2	5	Lu Ying	China	25.65	Q
4	2	4	Noemie It-Ting Thomas	Canada	25.76	Q, NR
5	2	6	Anna Dowgiert	Poland	25.82	Q, NR
6	1	6	Claire Donahue	United States	25.84	Q
7	1	7	Jiao Liuyang	China	25.93	Q
8	2	1	Triin Aljand	Estonia	25.96	Q
9	2	7	Louise Hansson	Sweden	25.97	
10	1	1	Aleksandra Urbanczyk	Poland	26.00	
11	1	3	Aleksandra Gerasimenya	Belarus	26.01	
11	2	3	Silvia di Pietro	Italy	26.01	
13	1	2	Ilaria Bianchi	Italy	26.02	
14	2	2	Vanessa Mohr	South Africa	26.16	
15	1	8	Brianna Throssell	Australia	26.17	
16	2	8	Daynara de Paula	Brazil	26.40	

=== Final ===
The final was held at 19:43.

Rank	Lane	Name	Nationality	Time	Notes
1st place, gold medalist(s)	3	Lu Ying	China	25.14	
2nd place, silver medalist(s)	1	Jiao Liuyang	China	25.23	
3rd place, bronze medalist(s)	4	Jeanette Ottesen	Denmark	25.55	
4	6	Noemie It-Ting Thomas	Canada	25.60	NR
5	5	Christine Magnuson	United States	25.70	
6	7	Claire Donahue	United States	25.88	
7	2	Anna Dowgiert	Poland	25.90	
8	8	Triin Aljand	Estonia	26.01	
