= Swimming at the 2011 Pan American Games – Women's 100 metre butterfly =

Women's 100 metre butterfly at the 2011 Pan American Games
- Venue: Scotiabank Aquatics Center
- Dates: October 15 (preliminaries and finals)
- Competitors: 23 from 17 nations
- Winning score: 58.73

Medalists
Gold medal	Claire Donahue	United States
Silver medal	Daynara de Paula	Brazil
Bronze medal	Elaine Breeden	United States

The women's 100 metre butterfly competition of the swimming events at the 2011 Pan American Games took place on October 15 at the Scotiabank Aquatics Center in the municipality of Zapopan, near Guadalajara, Mexico. The defending Pan American Games champion was Kathleen Hersey of the United States.

The race consisted of two lengths of the pool, both lengths being in the butterfly stroke.

== Records ==
Prior to this competition, the existing world and Pan American Games records were as follows:

World record	Sarah Sjöström (SWE)	56.06	Rome, Italy	July 27, 2009
Pan American Games record	Kathleen Hersey (USA)	59.21	Rio de Janeiro, Brazil	July 18, 2007

== Qualification ==
Each National Olympic Committee (NOC) was able to enter up to two entrants providing they had met the A standard (1:03.7) in the qualifying period (January 1, 2010 to September 4, 2011). NOCs were also permitted to enter one athlete providing they had met the B standard (1:05.6) in the same qualifying period.

== Results ==
All times are in minutes and seconds.

KEY:	q	Fastest non-qualifiers	Q	Qualified	NR	National record	PB	Personal best	SB	Seasonal best	PR	Pan American Games record

=== Heats ===
The first round was held on October 15.

Rank	Heat	Lane	Name	Nationality	Time	Notes
1	3	4	Claire Donahue	United States	58.59	QA, GR
2	1	4	Elaine Breeden	United States	59.23	QA
3	2	4	Daynara de Paula	Brazil	1:00.25	QA
4	1	5	Carolina Colorado Henao	Colombia	1:01.06	QA
5	2	3	Rita Medrano	Mexico	1:01.39	QA
6	3	1	Alia Atkinson	Jamaica	1:01.41	QA
7	2	5	Erin Miller	Canada	1:01.58	QA
8	1	3	Erika Torellas	Venezuela	1:01.82	QA
9	1	6	Alana Dillette	Bahamas	1:02.32	QB
10	3	5	Gabriella Silva	Brazil	1:02.86	QB
11	3	6	Elimar Barrios	Venezuela	1:03.25	QB
12	3	2	Cecilia Bertoncello	Argentina	1:03.31	QB
13	1	2	Melisa Mexia	Mexico	1:03.40	QB
14	3	3	Samantha Corea	Canada	1:04.14	QB
15	2	1	Karen Torrez	Bolivia	1:04.28	QB
16	2	2	Debra Rodriguez	Puerto Rico	1:04.29	QB
17	2	7	Marie Meza Peraza	Costa Rica	1:04.78	
18	2	6	Barbara Caraballo	Puerto Rico	1:05.23	
19	1	7	Yumisleisy Morales	Cuba	1:05.64	
20	3	7	Oriele Espinoza	Peru	1:06.16	
21	1	1	Julimar Avila	Honduras	1:06.86	
22	3	8	Lara Butler	Cayman Islands	1:08.34	
23	2	8	Dalia Massiel Torres	Nicaragua	1:08.65	

=== B Final ===
The B final was also held on October 15.

Rank	Lane	Name	Nationality	Time	Notes
9	7	Samantha Corea	Canada	1:02.38	
10	4	Alana Dillette	Bahamas	1:02.51	
11	3	Elimar Barrios	Venezuela	1:02.54	
12	6	Cecilia Bertoncello	Argentina	1:02.56	
13	2	Melisa Mexia	Mexico	1:03.62	
14	8	Debra Rodriguez	Puerto Rico	1:03.63	
15	1	Karen Torrez	Bolivia	1:03.78	
16	5	Lara Butler	Cayman Islands	1:06.97	

=== Final A ===
The final was also held on October 15.

Rank	Lane	Name	Nationality	Time	Notes
1st place, gold medalist(s)	4	Claire Donahue	United States	58.73	
2nd place, silver medalist(s)	3	Daynara de Paula	Brazil	59.30	
3rd place, bronze medalist(s)	5	Elaine Breeden	United States	59.81	
4	1	Erin Miller	Canada	1:00.49	
5	2	Rita Medrano	Mexico	1:00.75	
6	6	Carolina Colorado Henao	Colombia	1:01.11	
7	7	Alia Atkinson	Jamaica	1:01.17	
8	8	Erika Torellas	Venezuela	1:01.56	
