= 2012 FINA World Swimming Championships (25 m) – Women's 100 metre butterfly =

Women's 100m Butterfly at the 2012 Short Course Worlds
- Dates: 15 December (heats and semifinals); 16 December (final)
- Winning time: 56.13

Medalists
gold medal	Ilaria Bianchi	Italy
silver medal	Liu Zige	China
bronze medal	Jemma Lowe	Great Britain

The women's 100 metre butterfly event at the 11th FINA World Swimming Championships (25m) took place 15 – 16 December 2012 at the Sinan Erdem Dome.

== Records ==
Prior to this competition, the existing world and championship records were as follows.

	Name	Nation	Time	Location	Date
World record	Diane Bui Duyet	France	55.05	Istanbul	12 December 2009
Championship record	Felicity Galvez	Australia	55.43	Dubai	19 December 2010

No new records were set during this competition.

== Results ==
=== Heats ===
Rank	Heat	Lane	Name	Time	Notes
1	7	8	Liu Zige (CHN)	57.31	Q
2	7	7	Noemie It-Ting Thomas (CAN)	57.32	Q
3	5	4	Jemma Lowe (GBR)	57.53	Q
4	5	5	Claire Donahue (USA)	57.58	Q
5	6	5	Louise Hansson (SWE)	57.81	Q
6	5	3	Kathleen Hersey (USA)	57.83	Q
7	7	6	Daynara de Paula (BRA)	57.87	Q
8	7	5	Katerine Savard (CAN)	58.01	Q
9	6	7	Nao Kobayashi (JPN)	58.10	Q
10	6	4	Ilaria Bianchi (ITA)	58.15	Q
11	6	9	Kona Fujita (JPN)	58.22	Q
12	6	6	Emilia Pikkarainen (FIN)	58.34	Q
13	5	2	Silvia di Pietro (ITA)	58.36	Q
14	6	3	Birgit Koschischek (AUT)	58.39	Q
15	4	6	Sze Hang Yu (HKG)	58.50	Q
16	7	3	Veronika Popova (RUS)	58.54	Q
17	6	2	Brianna Throssell (AUS)	58.71	
18	2	0	Lu Ying (CHN)	58.85	
19	5	8	Danielle Villars (SUI)	58.87	NR
20	6	1	İris Rosenberger (TUR)	58.96	
21	5	7	Judit Ignacio Sorribes (ESP)	59.09	
21	6	0	Mandy Loots (RSA)	59.09	
23	7	9	Eszter Dara (HUN)	59.25	
24	7	2	Paulina Schmiedel (GER)	59.26	
25	7	0	Marne Erasmus (RSA)	59.31	
26	2	8	Elmira Aigaliyeva (KAZ)	59.45	
27	7	1	Sara Oliveira (POR)	59.74	
28	5	0	Anna Dowgiert (POL)	59.80	
29	5	6	Daria Tcvetkova (RUS)	1:00.01	
30	5	9	Chan Kin Lok (HKG)	1:00.18	
31	6	8	Denisa Smolenová (SVK)	1:00.77	
32	4	3	Jasmin Rosenberger (TUR)	1:00.89	
33	4	5	Nina Rangelova (BUL)	1:01.06	
34	4	7	Jessica Camposano (COL)	1:01.08	
35	4	2	Sini Kuutamo (FIN)	1:01.24	
36	3	5	Manuela Morano (ARG)	1:01.51	
37	3	3	Karen Torrez (BOL)	1:02.07	NR
38	4	1	Monalisa Arieswati Lorenza (INA)	1:03.14	
39	3	2	Caroline Pickering Puamau (FIJ)	1:03.30	
40	4	4	Nguyen Thi Kim Tuyen (VIE)	1:03.31	
41	4	9	Zabrina Holder (BAR)	1:03.38	
42	4	8	Pooja Raghava Alva (IND)	1:03.45	
43	4	0	Dalia Tórrez Zamora (NCA)	1:04.33	
44	3	6	Oriele Espinoza (PER)	1:04.41	
45	3	8	Ana Sofia Nobrega (ANG)	1:05.28	
46	3	4	Marie Meza (CRC)	1:05.61	
47	3	0	Angie Galdamez (HON)	1:05.76	
48	3	1	Tieri Erasito (FIJ)	1:06.32	
49	1	5	Su Rim Choe (PRK)	1:06.71	
50	2	4	Kiran Khan (PAK)	1:06.87	
51	3	9	Emily Siobhan Muteti (KEN)	1:09.11	
52	3	7	Faith Edorodion (NGR)	1:09.60	
53	2	5	Oreoluwa Cherebin (GRN)	1:10.32	
54	2	2	Felicity Passon (SEY)	1:10.79	
55	2	7	Afsana Ismayilova (AZE)	1:11.94	
56	2	3	Monica Saili (SAM)	1:12.37	
57	2	1	Charissa Sofia Panuve (TGA)	1:13.40	
58	2	6	Surennyam Erdenebileg (MGL)	1:14.00	
	1	3	Erika Torrellas (VEN)	DNS	
	1	4	Wendy Rodriguez (VEN)	DNS	
	5	1	Katrine Soerensen (DEN)	DNS	
	7	4	Jeanette Ottesen (DEN)	DNS	

=== Semifinals ===
Rank	Heat	Lane	Name	Nationality	Time	Notes
1	1	2	Ilaria Bianchi	Italy	56.60	Q
2	1	4	Noemie It-Ting Thomas	Canada	56.64	Q, NR
3	2	5	Jemma Lowe	United Kingdom	57.16	Q
4	2	4	Liu Zige	China	57.24	Q
5	1	5	Claire Donahue	United States	57.51	Q
6	2	1	Silvia di Pietro	Italy	57.62	Q
7	1	3	Kathleen Hersey	United States	57.65	Q
8	2	3	Louise Hansson	Sweden	57.79	
9	1	8	Veronika Popova	Russia	57.82	
10	2	6	Daynara de Paula	Brazil	57.87	Q
11	2	2	Nao Kobayashi	Japan	57.99	
12	1	7	Emilia Pikkarainen	Finland	58.04	NR
13	1	6	Katerine Savard	Canada	58.13	
14	1	1	Birgit Koschischek	Austria	58.40	
15	2	8	Sze Hang Yu	Hong Kong	58.66	
16	2	7	Kona Fujita	Japan	58.71	

=== Final ===
The final was held at 19:49.

Rank	Lane	Name	Nationality	Time	Notes
1st place, gold medalist(s)	4	Ilaria Bianchi	Italy	56.13	NR
2nd place, silver medalist(s)	6	Liu Zige	China	56.58	
3rd place, bronze medalist(s)	3	Jemma Lowe	Great Britain	56.66	
4	5	Noemie It-Ting Thomas	Canada	56.92	
5	2	Claire Donahue	United States	57.00	
6	1	Kathleen Hersey	United States	57.35	
7	7	Silvia di Pietro	Italy	58.14	
8	8	Daynara de Paula	Brazil	59.64	
