= Swimming at the 2011 Pan American Games – Women's 200 metre butterfly =

Women's 200 metre butterfly at the 2011 Pan American Games
- Venue: Scotiabank Aquatics Center
- Dates: October 19 (preliminaries and finals)
- Competitors: 13 from 9 nations

Medalists
Gold medal	Kim Vandenberg	United States
Silver medal	Lyndsay de Paul	United States
Bronze medal	Joanna Maranhão	Brazil

The women's 200 metre butterfly competition of the swimming events at the 2011 Pan American Games took place on October 19 at the Scotiabank Aquatics Center in the municipality of Zapopan, near Guadalajara, Mexico. The defending Pan American Games champion was Kathleen Hersey of the United States.

This race consisted of four lengths of the pool all in the butterfly stroke.

== Records ==
Prior to this competition, the existing world and Pan American Games records were as follows:

World record	Zige Liu (CHN)	2:01.81	Jinan, China	October 21, 2009
Pan American Games record	Kathleen Hersey (USA)	2:07.64	Rio de Janeiro, Brazil	July 21, 2007

== Qualification ==
Each National Olympic Committee (NOC) was able to enter up to two entrants providing they had met the A standard (2:19.9) in the qualifying period (January 1, 2010 to September 4, 2011). NOCs were also permitted to enter one athlete providing they had met the B standard (2:24.1) in the same qualifying period.

== Results ==
All times are in minutes and seconds.

KEY:	q	Fastest non-qualifiers	Q	Qualified	GR	Games record	NR	National record	PB	Personal best	SB	Seasonal best

=== Heats ===
The first round was held on October 19.

Rank	Heat	Lane	Name	Nationality	Time	Notes
1	1	4	Kim Vandenberg	United States	2:12.04	QA
2	2	4	Lyndsay de Paul	United States	2:14.17	QA
3	2	5	Rita Medrano	Mexico	2:14.44	QA
4	1	5	Joanna Maranhão	Brazil	2:14.63	QA
5	2	3	Brenna Maclean	Canada	2:15.87	QA
6	1	2	Eliana Barrios	Venezuela	2:17.06	QA
7	1	6	Prisciliana Escobar	Mexico	2:18.36	QA
8	1	3	Erin Miller	Canada	2:18.37	QA
9	2	2	Yumisleisy Morales	Cuba	2:19.07	QB
10	2	6	Daiene Dias	Brazil	2:19.23	QB
11	1	7	Amara Gibbs	Barbados	2:30.26	QB
12	2	1	Lara Butler	Cayman Islands	2:35.44	QB
	2	7	Oriele Espinoza	Peru		DNS

=== B Final ===
The B final was also held on October 19.

Rank	Lane	Name	Nationality	Time	Notes
9	4	Yumisleisy Morales	Cuba	2:19.78	
10	3	Amara Gibbs	Barbados	2:30.88	
11	5	Daiene Dias	Brazil	DNS	

=== A Final ===
The A final was also held on October 19.

Rank	Lane	Name	Nationality	Time	Notes
1st place, gold medalist(s)	4	Kim Vandenberg	United States	2:10.54	
2nd place, silver medalist(s)	5	Lyndsay de Paul	United States	2:12.34	
3rd place, bronze medalist(s)	3	Rita Merdano	Mexico	2:12.43	
4	6	Joanna Maranhão	Brazil	2:13.00	
5	8	Erin Miller	Canada	2:16.10	
6	2	Brenna Maclean	Canada	2:16.13	
7	7	Eliana Barrios	Venezuela	2:18.19	
8	1	Prisciliana Escobar	Mexico	2:20.16	
