= 2018 FINA World Swimming Championships (25 m) – Women's 100 metre breaststroke =

Women swimming championships

Women's 100 metre breaststroke at the 2018 FINA World Swimming Championships (25 m)
- Venue: Hangzhou Sports Park Stadium
- Dates: 14 December (heats and semifinals); 15 December (final)
- Competitors: 49
- Winning time: 1.03.51

Medalists
gold medal	Alia Atkinson	Jamaica
silver medal	Katie Meili	United States
bronze medal	Jessica Hansen	Australia

The women's 100 metre breaststroke competition of the 2018 FINA World Swimming Championships (25 m) was held on 14 and 15 December 2018.

== Records ==
Prior to the competition, the existing world and championship records were as follows.

	Name	Nation	Time	Location	Date
World record	Rūta Meilutytė	Lithuania	1:02.36	Moscow	12 October 2013
Championship record	Alia Atkinson	Jamaica	1:02.36	Doha	6 December 2014

== Results ==
=== Heats ===
The heats were started on 14 December at 10:49.

Rank	Heat	Lane	Name	Nationality	Time	Notes
1	6	1	Katie Meili	United States	1:03.76	Q
2	6	4	Alia Atkinson	Jamaica	1:04.34	Q
3	6	2	Martina Carraro	Italy	1:05.06	Q
3	6	6	Fanny Lecluyse	Belgium	1:05.06	Q
5	4	2	Shi Jinglin	China	1:05.24	Q
5	6	3	Arianna Castiglioni	Italy	1:05.24	Q
7	4	3	Jessica Hansen	Australia	1:05.33	Q
8	4	4	Jenna Laukkanen	Finland	1:05.38	Q
9	5	7	Yu Jingyao	China	1:05.55	Q
10	5	6	Kanako Watanabe	Japan	1:05.62	Q
11	5	5	Jessica Vall	Spain	1:05.70	Q
12	5	3	Maria Temnikova	Russia	1:05.82	Q
13	6	5	Vitalina Simonova	Russia	1:05.85	Q
14	4	0	Lisa Mamie	Switzerland	1:05.87	Q
15	5	4	Rūta Meilutytė	Lithuania	1:06.29	Q
16	5	2	Runa Imai	Japan	1:06.35	Q
17	4	9	Anna Sztankovics	Hungary	1:06.42	
18	6	7	Jessica Steiger	Germany	1:06.47	
19	4	6	Ida Hulkko	Finland	1:06.55	
20	5	1	Julia Sebastián	Argentina	1:06.83	
21	4	8	Maria Romanjuk	Estonia	1:06.90	
22	4	7	Jenna Strauch	Australia	1:07.16	
23	5	0	Niamh Coyne	Ireland	1:07.19	
24	5	8	Cornelia Pammer	Austria	1:07.24	
25	3	4	Viktoriya Zeynep Güneş	Turkey	1:07.39	
26	3	2	Sophie Angus	Canada	1:07.53	
27	6	0	Andrea Podmaníková	Slovakia	1:07.55	
28	3	6	Tatiana Chișca	Moldova	1:08.21	
29	6	9	Raquel Gomes Pereira	Portugal	1:08.27	
30	3	1	Mercedes Toledo	Venezuela	1:08.30	
31	3	3	Kan Cheuk Tung Natalie	Hong Kong	1:08.52	
32	6	8	Lin Pei-wun	Chinese Taipei	1:09.01	
33	5	9	Ciara Smith	New Zealand	1:09.13	
34	3	5	Emily Visagie	South Africa	1:09.46	
35	3	0	Rebecca Kamau	Kenya	1:09.47	
36	3	7	Tilka Paljk	Zambia	1:11.22	
37	2	4	Matelita Buadromo	Fiji	1:12.57	
38	2	5	Tilali Scanlan	American Samoa	1:12.72	
39	3	9	Cheang Weng Lam	Macau	1:13.12	
40	3	8	Anahi Schreuders	Aruba	1:13.41	
41	2	8	Jang Myong-gyong	North Korea	1:14.42	
42	1	5	Vorleak Sok	Cambodia	1:15.37	
43	2	3	Kirsten Fisher-Marsters	Cook Islands	1:16.44	
44	2	6	Latroya Pina	Cape Verde	1:16.83	
45	1	4	Nooran Ba Matraf	Yemen	1:17.08	
46	1	3	Darya Semyonova	Turkmenistan	1:18.73	
47	2	2	Rehema Kalate	Papua New Guinea	1:21.48	
48	2	1	Bianca Mitchell	Antigua and Barbuda	1:21.87	
49	2	7	Lungelo Nxumalo	Eswatini	1:31.73	
	4	1	Susann Bjørnsen	Norway	DNS	
	4	5	Molly Hannis	United States	DNS	

=== Semifinals ===
The semifinals were started on 14 December at 20:42.

==== Semifinal 1 ====
Rank	Lane	Name	Nationality	Time	Notes
1	4	Alia Atkinson	Jamaica	1:04.07	Q
2	5	Fanny Lecluyse	Belgium	1:04.82	Q
3	6	Jenna Laukkanen	Finland	1:05.01	Q
4	2	Kanako Watanabe	Japan	1:05.09	Q
5	7	Maria Temnikova	Russia	1:05.52	
6	3	Arianna Castiglioni	Italy	1:05.80	
7	8	Runa Imai	Japan	1:06.22	
8	1	Lisa Mamie	Switzerland	1:06.49	

==== Semifinal 2 ====
Rank	Lane	Name	Nationality	Time	Notes
1	6	Jessica Hansen	Australia	1:04.11	Q
2	4	Katie Meili	United States	1:04.54	Q
3	3	Shi Jinglin	China	1:04.73	Q
4	5	Martina Carraro	Italy	1:04.87	Q
5	2	Yu Jingyao	China	1:05.14	
6	7	Jessica Vall	Spain	1:05.27	
7	1	Vitalina Simonova	Russia	1:05.54	
8	8	Rūta Meilutytė	Lithuania	1:06.16	

=== Final ===
The final was held on 15 December at 20:37.

Rank	Lane	Name	Nationality	Time	Notes
1st place, gold medalist(s)	4	Alia Atkinson	Jamaica	1:03.51	
2nd place, silver medalist(s)	3	Katie Meili	United States	1:03.63	
3rd place, bronze medalist(s)	5	Jessica Hansen	Australia	1:04.61	
4	7	Martina Carraro	Italy	1:04.73	
5	1	Jenna Laukkanen	Finland	1:04.96	
6	6	Shi Jinglin	China	1:05.10	
7	2	Fanny Lecluyse	Belgium	1:05.13	
8	8	Kanako Watanabe	Japan	1:05.34	
