= 2018 FINA World Swimming Championships (25 m) – Women's 100 metre individual medley =

Womenen's 100 metre individual medley at the 2018 FINA World Swimming Championships (25 m)
- Venue: Hangzhou Sports Park Stadium
- Dates: 13 December (heats and semifinals); 14 December (final)
- Competitors: 39 from 34 nations
- Winning time: 57.26

Medalists
gold medal	Katinka Hosszú	Hungary
silver medal	Runa Imai	Japan
bronze medal	Alia Atkinson	Jamaica

The women's 100 metre individual medley competition of the 2018 FINA World Swimming Championships (25 m) was held on 13 and 14 December 2018.

== Records ==
Prior to the competition, the existing world and championship records were as follows.

	Name	Nation	Time	Location	Date
World record	Katinka Hosszú	Hungary	56.51	Berlin	7 August 2017
Championship record	Katinka Hosszú	Hungary	56.70	Doha	5 December 2014

== Results ==
=== Heats ===
The heats were started on 13 December at 10:06.

Rank	Heat	Lane	Name	Nationality	Time	Notes
1	4	4	Katinka Hosszú	Hungary	58.05	Q
2	4	3	Melanie Margalis	United States	58.87	Q
3	3	5	Runa Imai	Japan	58.99	Q
4	4	5	Emily Seebohm	Australia	59.11	Q
5	3	3	Ye Shiwen	China	59.24	Q
6	4	6	Jenna Laukkanen	Finland	59.39	Q
7	3	6	Rika Omoto	Japan	59.48	Q
8	3	4	Kathleen Baker	United States	59.52	Q
9	2	4	Alia Atkinson	Jamaica	59.69	Q
10	3	2	Ilaria Cusinato	Italy	59.76	Q
11	2	5	Maria Kameneva	Russia	59.78	Q
12	2	6	Lena Kreundl	Austria	59.94	Q
13	3	8	Rūta Meilutytė	Lithuania	1:00.11	Q
14	3	7	Lidón Muñoz del Campo	Spain	1:00.71	Q
15	2	3	Susann Bjørnsen	Norway	1:00.82	Q
16	2	2	Yang Chang	China	1:01.24	Q
17	3	0	Marie Pietruschka	Germany	1:01.34	
18	4	2	Anastasiia Sorokina	Russia	1:01.47	
19	2	7	Kan Cheuk Tung Natalie	Hong Kong	1:01.49	
20	4	7	Kristýna Horská	Czech Republic	1:01.60	
21	4	1	Viktoriya Zeynep Güneş	Turkey	1:01.66	
22	4	0	Diana Petkova	Bulgaria	1:01.75	
23	3	1	Jessica Vall	Spain	1:01.79	
24	1	4	Neža Klančar	Slovenia	1:01.87	
25	2	8	Rebecca Meder	South Africa	1:01.93	
26	2	1	Ieva Maļuka	Latvia	1:01.94	
27	3	9	Raquel Gomes Pereira	Portugal	1:02.07	
28	4	8	Seraina Sturzenegger	Switzerland	1:02.10	
29	2	9	Andrea Podmaníková	Slovakia	1:02.77	
30	4	9	Margaret Markvardt	Estonia	1:02.99	
31	2	0	Julia Sebastián	Argentina	1:03.16	
32	1	5	Georgina McCarthy	New Zealand	1:04.50	
33	1	3	Nicole Rautemberg	Paraguay	1:05.04	
34	1	0	Sara Pastrana	Honduras	1:07.96	
35	1	8	Nooran Ba-Matraf	Yemen	1:08.53	
36	1	2	Latroya Pina	Cape Verde	1:09.99	
37	1	6	Avice Meya	Uganda	1:13.51	
38	1	7	Alex Maclaren	Turks and Caicos Islands	1:19.83	
39	1	1	Aishath Sausan	Maldives	1:19.91	

=== Semifinals ===
The semifinals were started on 13 December at 20:06.

==== Semifinal 1 ====
Rank	Lane	Name	Nationality	Time	Notes
1	4	Melanie Margalis	United States	58.33	Q
2	6	Kathleen Baker	United States	58.54	Q
3	3	Jenna Laukkanen	Finland	58.60	Q
4	5	Emily Seebohm	Australia	58.64	Q
5	7	Lena Kreundl	Austria	59.46	
6	2	Ilaria Cusinato	Italy	59.85	
7	1	Lidón Muñoz del Campo	Spain	1:00.69	
8	8	Yang Chang	China	1:00.86	

==== Semifinal 2 ====
Rank	Lane	Name	Nationality	Time	Notes
1	4	Katinka Hosszú	Hungary	57.69	Q
2	5	Runa Imai	Japan	58.04	Q
3	2	Alia Atkinson	Jamaica	58.20	Q
4	6	Rika Omoto	Japan	58.60	Q
5	3	Ye Shiwen	China	58.94	
6	7	Maria Kameneva	Russia	58.97	
7	1	Rūta Meilutytė	Lithuania	59.81	
7	1	Susann Bjørnsen	Norway	1:01.04	

=== Final ===
The final was held on 14 December at 19:20.

Rank	Lane	Name	Nationality	Time	Notes
1st place, gold medalist(s)	4	Katinka Hosszú	Hungary	57.26	
2nd place, silver medalist(s)	5	Runa Imai	Japan	57.85	
3rd place, bronze medalist(s)	3	Alia Atkinson	Jamaica	58.11	
4	6	Melanie Margalis	United States	58.32	
5	2	Kathleen Baker	United States	58.47	
6	8	Emily Seebohm	Australia	58.78	
7	7	Jenna Laukkanen	Finland	59.11	
8	1	Rika Omoto	Japan	59.18	
