= Erica Dittmer =

Mexican swimmer

Personal information
- Full name: Erica Dittmer Cane
- National team: Mexico
- Born: September 15, 1991 (age 35) Houston, Texas, U.S.
- Height: 180 cm (5 ft 11 in)

Sport
- Sport: Swimming
- Strokes: Freestyle
- Club: Pack Swim Team; Greater Houston
- College team: Texas A&M University
- Coach: Mike McCauley (Pack Swim Team); Steve Bultman (Texas A&M)

Erica Dittmer (born September 15, 1991), also known as Erica Dittmer Cane, is an American-born Mexican breaststroke, freestyle and medley swimmer who competed for Texas A&M University and for Mexico in the 2012 Summer Olympics in the 200-meter individual medley.

Born in Houston, Texas in Harris County, to Jeff and Elizabeth Dittmer, she holds dual American and Mexican citizenship as her mother, an American citizen at the time of her birth, was born in Mexico.

Dittmer attended Klein High School where she graduated in 2010. At Klein High, where she was coached by Tom Harwood, she was a five-team district champion and qualified for the state championship three-times. As a Senior, at the Texas State Championships, she captured a second place in the 50 free and 100 breast. As a Sophomore, she won the 50 free and 100 breast at the State Championship. Like most highly competitive swimmers, in addition to competing for her High School, she competed in age group competition, training with Coach Mike McCauley with the Pack Swim Team. An excellent student, she earned academic All American honors during her high school years.

== Texas A&M University swimming ==
Dittmer studied and competed in swimming at Texas A&M University, under Hall of Fame Coach Steve Bultman. As in High School, she was diverse in the strokes in which she competed, and gained greater speed and technique in all four strokes during her college years. As an A&M Senior, she helped set a new school record in the 200 free relay of 1:28.02. She competed in six events at the NCAA Championships as a Junior, scoring for the team. In international competition during her Junior year, she swam for Mexico at the Fina World Championships in Barcelona, competing in the 50 and 100 breast, the 200 IM, and the 4x100 medley relay.

== 2012 Olympics ==
She swam at the 2012 Summer Olympics, representing Mexico in the 200 m individual medley. In challenging global competition, she finished 27th overall with a time of 2:16.54 in her 200-meter Individual Medley preliminary heat, and did not make the finals. Kim Pavlin of Croatia, who also swam the 200 IM event, and finished 30th was her teammate and trained with her at Texas A&M. A total of eight other 2012 Olympic women swimmers had trained with her at A&M, including fellow Mexican team members Liliana Ibanez, a 200 freestyler, and Rita Medrano.

== See also ==
- Fernanda González, a 2012 Olympic teammate.
- Patricia Castañeda Miyamoto, a 2012 Olympic teammate.
- Kim Pavlin, a 2012 Olympic competitor and A&M fellow swimmer.
- Liliana Ibanez, a 200 freestyler, 2012 Olympic teammate and A&M fellow swimmer.
- Rita Medrano, a 2012 Olympic teammate and A&M fellow swimmer.
