= Noemie Thomas =

Canadian swimmer

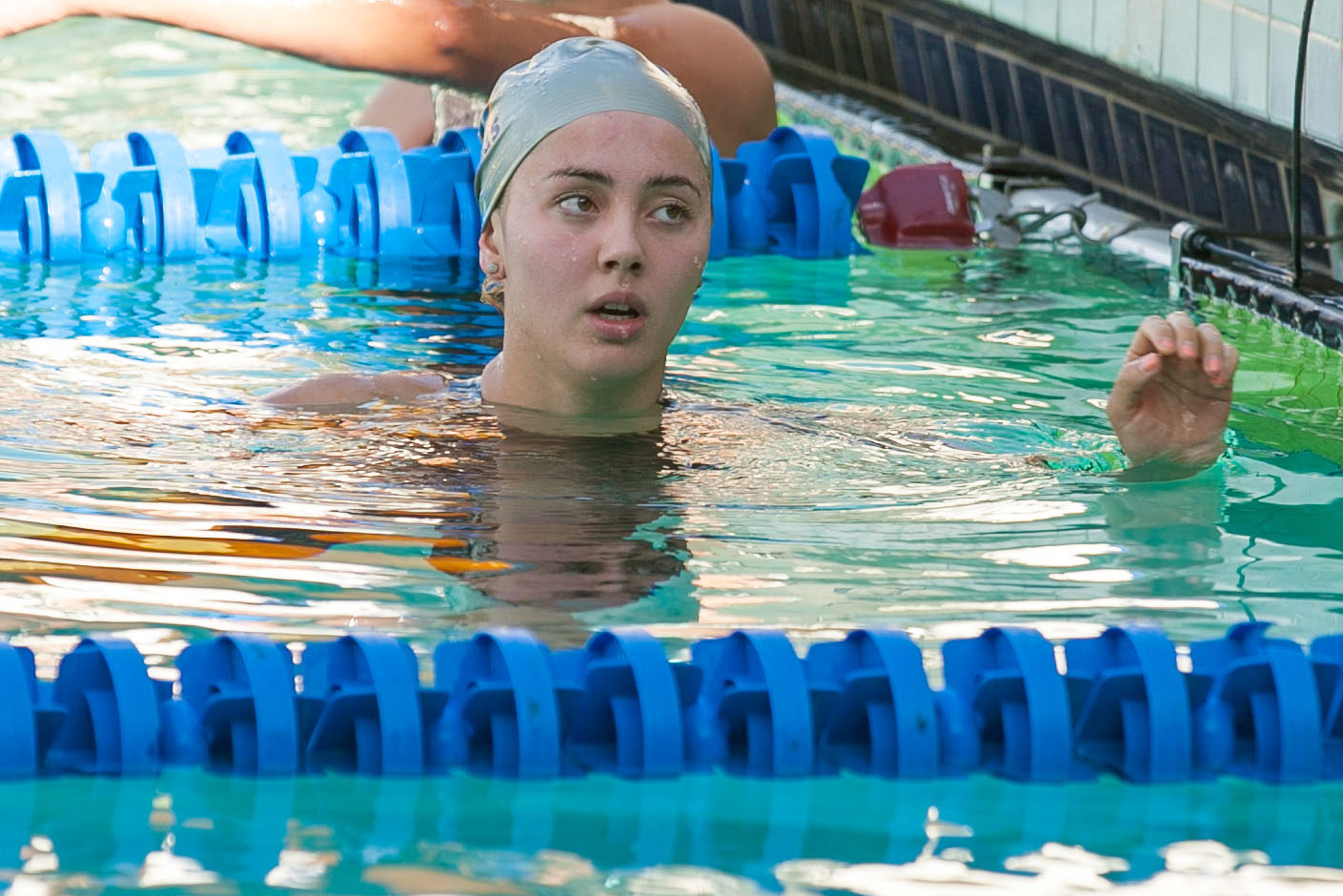
- Santa Clara 2016

Personal information
- Nationality: Canada
- Born: February 4, 1996 (age 30) Richmond, British Columbia, Canada
- Height: 5 ft 5 in (165 cm)
- Weight: 130 lb (59 kg)

Sport
- Sport: Swimming
- Strokes: Butterfly, Freestyle
- Club: UBC Dolphins Swim Club
- College team: University of California, Berkeley
Medal record
Pan American Games
Silver medal – second place	2015 Toronto	100 m butterfly
Silver medal – second place	2015 Toronto	4×100 m medley
Junior Pan Pacific Championships
Gold medal – first place	2012 Honolulu	100 m butterfly
Silver medal – second place	2012 Honolulu	4×100 m medley

Noemie Thomas (born February 4, 1996) is a Canadian swimmer who competes in the women's butterfly competitions. She holds the Canadian national record in the butterfly over the 50 m in the short course. Thomas also holds the Canadian junior butterfly record in the 100 m.

== Career ==
The Richmond, B.C., native made a big splash at the 2012 Junior Pan Pacific Swimming Championships in August in Hawaii. She took gold in the 100-metre butterfly, silver in the 4x100-m medley relay and finished fourth in the 200-m fly.

Noemie Thomas had her senior international coming-out party at the 2012 FINA World Swimming Championships (25 m), held in December. She set and then beat her own Canadian record in the 50-m butterfly at the world short-course meet, finishing fourth by just 0.05 seconds in the final. She followed up by establishing a new national mark in the 100-m fly and once again finished just outside the medals in fourth.

Success continued to follow her in 2013, capped by a seventh-place finish in the 100-m butterfly at the 2013 FINA World Championships in Barcelona. She earned Swimming Canada’s 2013 Junior Female Swimmer of the Year award for her performance. She and Katerine Savard give Canada a pair of medal threats in the event.

In 2016, she was officially named to Canada's Olympic team for the 2016 Summer Olympics.

== Results ==
- 4th place, 2012 FINA World Swimming Championships (25 m), 50 m butterfly.
- 4th place, 2012 FINA World Swimming Championships (25 m), 100 m butterfly.
- 7th place, 2013 FINA World Championships (long course), 100 m butterfly.

== Personal best times ==
=== Long course ===
Event	Time	Venue	Date	Notes
50 m butterfly	26.23	Saskatoon, Canada.	July 16, 2014	
100 m butterfly	57.02	Toronto, Canada.	April 5, 2016	
200 m butterfly	2.11.19	Toronto, Ontario, Canada.	April 4, 2015	

=== Short course ===
Event	Time	Venue	Date	Notes
50 m butterfly	25.60	Istanbul, Turkey	December 16, 2012	List of Canadian records in swimming
100 m butterfly	56.64	Istanbul, Turkey	December 15, 2012	
200 m butterfly	2.08.11	New Westminster, Canada.	February 16, 2014	
