= Liliana Ibáñez =

Mexican swimmer (born 1991)

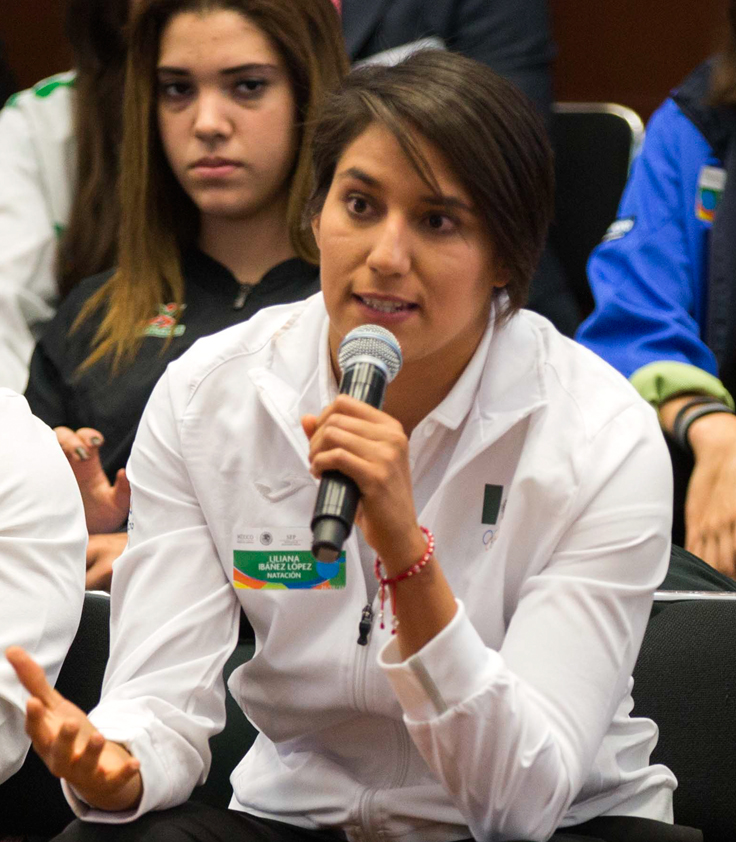
- Ibáñez (2016)

Personal information
- Full name: Liliana Ibáñez López
- National team: Mexico
- Born: 30 January 1991 (age 35) Celaya, Guanajuato, Mexico
- Height: 1.80 m (5 ft 11 in)
- Weight: 70 kg (154 lb)

Sport
- Sport: Swimming
- Strokes: Freestyle
- Club: Orcas Celaya swim club
- College team: Texas A&M University (U.S.)
- Coach: Steve Bultman (Texas A&M)
Medal record
Women's swimming
Representing Mexico
Pan American Games
Bronze medal – third place	2011 Guadalajara	4x200 freestyle
Central American and Caribbean Games
Gold medal – first place	2010 Mayagüez	4x100 m medley
Gold medal – first place	2014 Veracruz	4x100 m freestyle
Gold medal – first place	2014 Veracruz	4x100 m medley
Silver medal – second place	2006 Cartagena	4x100 m freestyle
Silver medal – second place	2010 Mayagüez	200 m freestyle
Silver medal – second place	2014 Veracruz	100 m freestyle
Bronze medal – third place	2010 Mayagüez	4x100 m freestyle
Bronze medal – third place	2014 Veracruz	50 m freestyle

Liliana Ibáñez López (born 30 January 1991 in Celaya, Guanajuato) is a Mexican competition swimmer for Texas A&M University who competed in freestyle at the 2012 London and 2016 Olympics.

Ibáñez was born to Bernardo Ibáñez and Socorro Lopez in Celaya, Mexico on January 30, 1991. She attended Colegio Panamericano del Centro and competed for the Orcas Celaya swim club where she was coached by Jorge Medina before moving to America and swimming for Texas A&M.

== Texas A&M University ==
Ibáñez majored in Architecture and was a swimming competitor at Texas A&M University under Hall of Fame Coach Steve Bultman, specializing in sprint freestyle and midrange events. She had five 2nd-place finishes at the 2011 Big 12 Championships. This included a quality 50 free swim time of 22.52. Unable to compete in her Sophomore year due to injury, at the 2013 SEC Championships she had two new best times in the 50 and 100 free, where she placed 6th with a 22.21 and 9th with a 48.48. In her third year, at the 2014 SEC Championships, Ibáñez earned a 6th-place finish in the 50 free with a 22.07, a 5th place in the 100 free with a 48.18, and a 5th place in the 200 free with a 1:44.96, with the 50 and 100 being new personal bests.

== Olympics ==
=== 2012 ===
At the 2012 Summer Olympics in London, while still an A&M underclassman, she finished 26th overall in the preliminary heats of the women's 200-metre freestyle with a time of 2:01.36.

In her other 2012 Olympic event, she finished 25th overall in the 100 m freestyle with a time of 55.71. Another 2012 Olympian Kim Pavlin of Croatia, who finished 30th in the 200 IM event, had trained with her at Texas A&M. A total of eight other 2012 Olympic women swimmers had trained with her at A&M, including her Mexican Olympic teammates Erica Dittmer and Rita Medrano.

=== 2016 ===
At the 2016 Olympics in Rio, she competed in the 50 m freestyle, placing her third in the seventh preliminary heat with a time of 25.25. In 1976, her time would have placed her in medal contention in global women's competition. However, in a very large and highly competitive field of 2016, as scholarships and funding for women's swimming competition had rapidly grown since America's Title IX legislation, she finished 28th overall. Her Olympic swimming coach was Steve Bultman, her former coach at Texas A&M.

=== Other international competitions ===
Ibanez competed in the 2009 Swimming World Championships in Rome, Italy.

At the 2011 Pan American Games, she swam the 50, 100, and 200 freestyle. She earned a 4th overall in the 200 free with a time of 2:02.90, going above her prelim time. She was 6th in the 100 free with a 55.74 and had a 26.17 in the 50 free, winning the B final. She swam in both free and medley relays.

In her most notable international competitions, in the 2006 Cartagena, 2010 Mayaguez, and 2014 Veracruz Central American and Caribbean games, she won a total of three golds, three silvers, and two bronze medals in freestyle and medley events.

=== Mexican national records ===
From 2010 to 2015, Ibáñez was the outstanding competitor for Mexico in sprint and mid-range freestyle events. She held the Mexican national record in the 50 free of 25.70, the 100 free of 56.04 and the 200 free of 2:02.19.
