= Alia Atkinson =

Jamaican swimmer (born 1988)

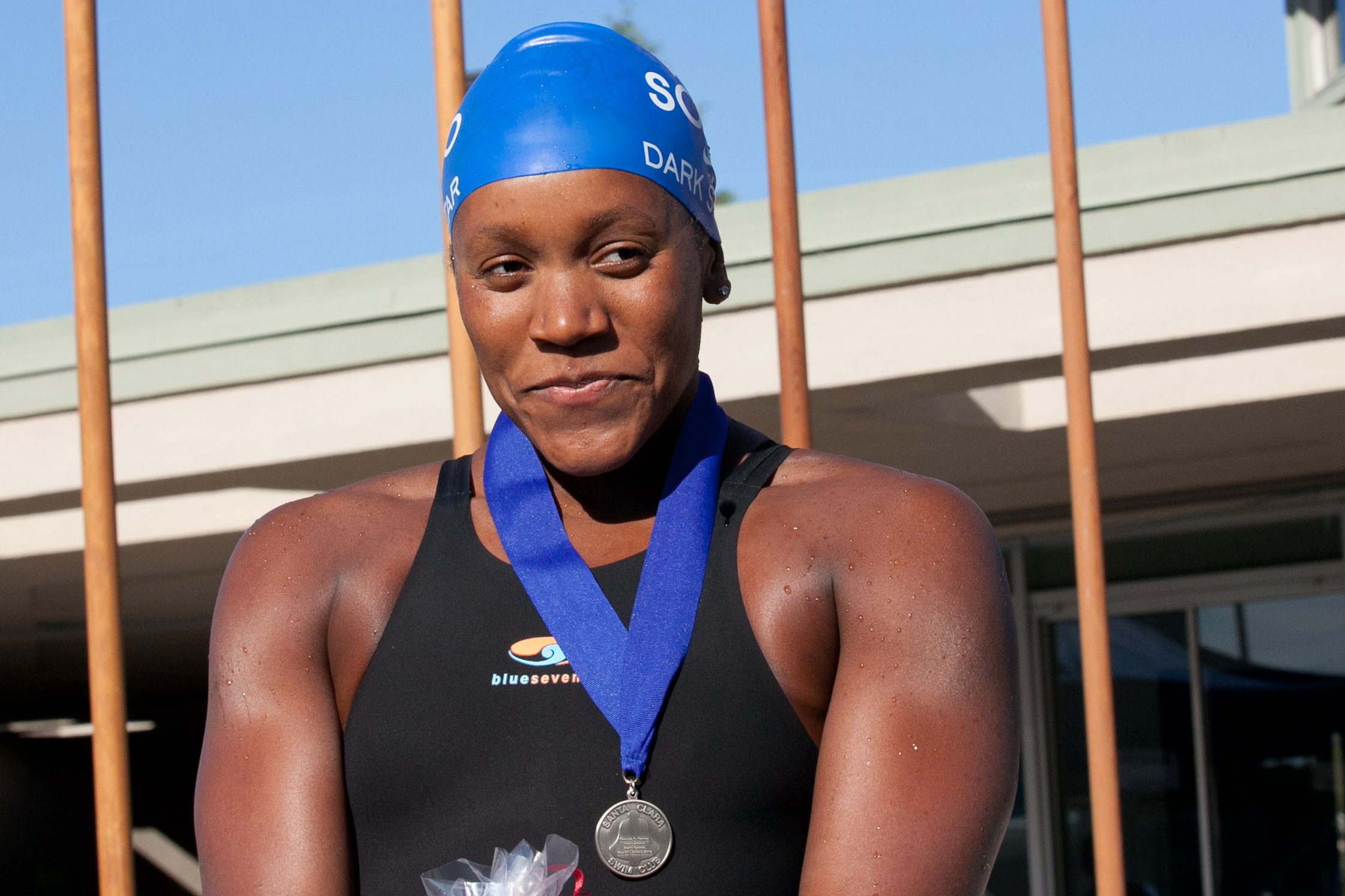
- Santa Clara 2012

Personal information
- Full name: Alia Shanee Atkinson
- National team: Jamaica
- Born: 11 December 1988 (age 37) Saint James Parish, Jamaica
- Height: 1.72 m (5 ft 8 in)
- Weight: 65 kg (143 lb)

Sport
- Sport: Swimming
- Strokes: Breaststroke, butterfly, freestyle, individual medley
- Club: South Florida Aquatic Club
- College team: Texas A&M University
- Coach: Chris Anderson; Steve Bultman (A&M)
Medal record
Women's swimming
Representing Jamaica
World Championships (LC)
| Silver medal – second place | 2015 Kazan | 50 m breaststroke |
| Bronze medal – third place | 2015 Kazan | 100 m breaststroke |
World Championships (SC)
| Gold medal – first place | 2014 Doha | 100 m breaststroke |
| Gold medal – first place | 2016 Windsor | 100 m breaststroke |
| Gold medal – first place | 2018 Hangzhou | 50 m breaststroke |
| Gold medal – first place | 2018 Hangzhou | 100 m breaststroke |
| Silver medal – second place | 2012 Istanbul | 50 m breaststroke |
| Silver medal – second place | 2012 Istanbul | 100 m breaststroke |
| Silver medal – second place | 2014 Doha | 50 m breaststroke |
| Silver medal – second place | 2016 Windsor | 50 m breaststroke |
| Bronze medal – third place | 2016 Windsor | 100 m medley |
| Bronze medal – third place | 2018 Hangzhou | 100 m medley |
Commonwealth Games
| Silver medal – second place | 2014 Glasgow | 50 m breaststroke |
| Silver medal – second place | 2018 Gold Coast | 50m breaststroke |
| Bronze medal – third place | 2014 Glasgow | 100 m breaststroke |
Pan American Games
| Silver medal – second place | 2011 Guadalajara | 200 m medley |
| Silver medal – second place | 2015 Toronto | 100 m breaststroke |
Central American and Caribbean Games
| Gold medal – first place | 2006 Cartagena | 50 m breaststroke |
| Gold medal – first place | 2006 Cartagena | 100 m breaststroke |
| Gold medal – first place | 2006 Cartagena | 50 m butterfly |
| Gold medal – first place | 2006 Cartagena | 200 m medley |
| Gold medal – first place | 2010 Mayagüez | 50 m breastroke |
| Gold medal – first place | 2010 Mayagüez | 100 m breaststroke |
| Gold medal – first place | 2010 Mayagüez | 200 m breaststroke |
| Gold medal – first place | 2010 Mayagüez | 200 m medley |
| Gold medal – first place | 2018 Barranquilla | 50 m breaststroke |
| Gold medal – first place | 2018 Barranquilla | 100 m breaststroke |
| Gold medal – first place | 2018 Barranquilla | 50 m butterfly |
| Silver medal – second place | 2006 Cartagena | 200 m breaststroke |
| Bronze medal – third place | 2018 Barranquilla | 50 m freestyle |
| Bronze medal – third place | 2018 Barranquilla | 100 m butterfly |

Alia Shanee Atkinson, СD (born 11 December 1988) is a Jamaican five-time Olympian and a former competitive swimmer whose international competition career spanned 19 years, 2003 to 2021 inclusive, at the senior level. At short course World Swimming Championships, she is a ten-time medalist in individual events, including four gold medals, four silver medals, and two bronze medals. She won a total of 124 medals, of which 74 were gold medals, at Swimming World Cup circuits over the course of her career. She won 14 total medals in individual events, 11 gold, 1 silver, and 2 bronze, from her first three Central American and Caribbean Games, in 2006, 2010, and 2018.

In 2014, Atkinson became the first Afro-Jamaican to win a world title in swimming, winning the short course 100-metre breaststroke at the 2014 World Swimming Championships with a world record time of 1:02.36. In 2016, she tied her world record in the short course 100 metre breaststroke on 26 August before setting a new world record in the short course 50-metre breaststroke on 26 October. Two years later, on 6 October 2018, she set her second new world record in the short course 50-metre breaststroke, marking her fourth world record time in an individual event. At the 2012 Summer Olympics, she became the second Jamaican swimmer to place in the top four at an Olympic Games, finishing fourth in the 100-metre breaststroke.

== Background ==
Atkinson calls Roehampton, Jamaica her hometown. At three years of age, she started swimming. In 2000, when she was approximately 12 years old, her family permanently relocated to the United States, moving to Florida. When she was 13 years old, she focused her swimming on breaststroke. Before then she mostly swam freestyle and butterfly. She was coached by Chris Anderson from 2001 through to her retirement in 2021. She mostly trained with the South Florida Aquatic Club swim team in Pembroke Pines, Florida in an Olympic-size swimming pool. In college, she majored in Psychology, earning her Bachelor of Science degree from Texas A&M University in 2010, where she also competed as part of the Texas A&M Aggies swim team under Hall of Fame coach Steve Bultman. In international swimming competitions, she represented Jamaica.

Atkinson stated her swimming mission in her SwimSwam bio as, "To place Jamaica on the world map of swimming; to agitate for the improvement of the infrastructural support for swimming in Jamaica so as to be able to take it to the next level; and to realize my full potential for myself, my parents, and my country." She has also been vocal about not being related to Janelle Atkinson, who was the first Jamaican swimmer to finish in the top four at an Olympic Games.

== Career ==
=== 2004–2011 ===
Atkinson was 15 years old and a high school junior at the time of her Olympic debut at the 2004 Summer Olympics in Athens, Greece. She competed in the 50-metre freestyle, ranking 44th overall, and the 100-metre breaststroke, ranking 32nd overall. In March 2006, Atkinson competed at her first Commonwealth Games, the 2006 Commonwealth Games in Melbourne, Australia. She carried the flag for her Jamaica at the opening ceremony of the 2007 Pan American Games in Rio de Janeiro, Brazil, where she set the Jamaican record in the 100-metre butterfly with a time of 1:02.40.

In the 2008 Olympics in Beijing, China she finished 25th in the women's 200-metre breaststroke. She also competed in the 2010 Commonwealth Games in Delhi, India in October. She placed first in the 200-yard breaststroke at the 2010 NCAA Championships, swimming for Texas A&M. Her swim made her the second NCAA champion in swimming for Texas A&M after Julia Wilkinson. At the 2011 Pan American Games in Guadalajara, Mexico, Atkinson won the silver medal in the 200-metre individual medley.

=== 2012 ===
==== 2012 Summer Olympics ====
At the 2012 Summer Olympics in London, England, Atkinson competed in three individual events. She qualified for the 2012 Olympics 100 m women's breaststroke final after defeating Canadian rival Tera van Beilen with a time of 1:06.79 in a head-to-head swim-off for a spot in the final. She subsequently placed 4th in the final of the 2012 Olympics 100 m women's breaststroke finishing with a time of 1:06.93. This made Atkinson the second Jamaican swimmer to place in the top four of a swimming event at an Olympic Games behind Janelle Atkinson who achieved the feat at the 2000 Summer Olympics in the 400-metre freestyle.

In the 200-metre breaststroke, Atkinson ranked 27th in the prelims. She also competed in the 50-metre freestyle where she placed 37th overall.

==== 2012 World Swimming Championships ====
2012 World Championships (SC)
| Silver medal – second place | 50 m breaststroke | 29.67 |
| Silver medal – second place | 100 m breaststroke | 1:03.80 |

Following the 2012 Olympics, Atkinson competed in the 2012 World Swimming Championships conducted in short course metres and held in Istanbul, Turkey in December 2012. She won the silver medal in the 50-metre breaststroke with a time of 29.67 in the final. In the final of the 100-metre breaststroke, she swam a 1:03.80 and won the silver medal.

=== 2014 ===
==== 2014 Commonwealth Games ====
She won two medals at the 2014 Commonwealth Games in the summer of 2014, silver in the 50 m breaststroke and bronze in the 100 m breaststroke. She also set two Commonwealth Games records in the heats and semifinal of the 50 m breaststroke. Her swim of 2:25.48 in the long course 200-metre breaststroke set a new national record for Jamaica in the event.

==== 2014 Swimming World Cup ====
At the 2014 FINA Swimming World Cup stop in Singapore in November 2014, Atkinson won the short course 200-metre breaststroke, setting a new national record with her time of 2:17.84.

==== 2014 World Swimming Championships ====
2014 World Championships (SC)
| Gold medal – first place | 100 m breaststroke | 1:02.36 (tie WR) |
| Silver medal – second place | 50 m breaststroke | 28.91 |

Atkinson won the 100-metre breaststroke at the 2014 Short Course World Championships in Doha, Qatar in December (equaling the record of 1:02.36 set by Rūta Meilutytė in 2013), becoming the first Afro-Jamaican woman to win a world swimming title. Her swim was the second time a woman hit the 1:02.36 mark internationally after Meilutytė. Because Atkinson was the second woman to reach the world record time she was not awarded the $10,000 associated with setting a world record because she did not set a new world record, instead tying the pre-existing one Meilutytė set in 2013. In the 50-metre breaststroke she won the silver medal with a time of 28.91.

=== 2015 ===
==== 2015 World Aquatics Championships ====
2015 World Championships (LC)
| Silver medal – second place | 50 m breaststroke | 30.11 (NR) |
| Bronze medal – third place | 100 m breaststroke | 1:06.42 |

In August 2015 at the 2015 World Aquatics Championships in Kazan, Russia, Atkinson medaled in two individual events. She won the silver medal in the 50-metre breaststroke with a time of 30.11 in the final. Her swim set a new national record for Jamaica in the 50-metre breaststroke. In the 100-metre breaststroke, she swam a 1:06.42 in the final and won the bronze medal.

==== 2015 Swimming World Cup ====
At the 2015 FINA Swimming World Cup stop in Dubai, United Arab Emirates in November 2015, Atkinson swam a personal best time of 1:05.93 in the long course 100-metre breaststroke and set a new national record in the event. Her swim tied her for the 16th fastest swimmer in the event globally with Rikke Pedersen who was the world record holder in the long course 200-metre breaststroke at the time.

=== 2016 ===
==== 2016 Summer Olympics ====
At the 2016 Summer Olympics in Rio de Janeiro, Brazil, she placed eighth in the final of the 100-metre breaststroke, swimming a 1:08.10.

==== 2016 Swimming World Cup ====
At the 2016 FINA Swimming World Cup stop in Chartres, France in August 2016, Atkinson again tied the world record in the short course 100-metre breaststroke with a time of 1:02.36. She did not win the $10,000 prize money for a world record as it was not a new world record.

In October 2016, at the Swimming World Cup stop in Tokyo, Japan, Atkinson swam a 28.64 in the short course 50-metre breaststroke setting a new world record in the event.

==== 2016 World Swimming Championships ====
2016 World Championships (SC)
| Gold medal – first place | 100 m breaststroke | 1:03.03 |
| Silver medal – second place | 50 m breaststroke | 29.11 |
| Bronze medal – third place | 100 m individual medley | 58.04 |

In December 2016 at the 2016 World Swimming Championships in Windsor, Canada and conducted in short course metres, Atkinson medaled in three individual events. She won the gold medal in the 100-metre breastsroke ahead of Lilly King. In the 50-metre breaststroke, she swam a 29.11 in the final and won the silver medal in the event. For the 100-metre individual medley she won the bronze medal, swimming a 58.04 in the final.

=== 2018 ===
==== 2018 Swimming World Cup ====
Atkinson competed for Jamaica at the 2018 FINA Swimming World Cup in Budapest, Hungary. In the 50-metre breaststroke she swam a 28.56, breaking her own world record in the event she set in 2016.

==== 2018 World Swimming Championships ====
2018 World Championships (SC)
| Gold medal – first place | 50 m breaststroke | 29.05 |
| Gold medal – first place | 100 m breaststroke | 1:03.51 |
| Bronze medal – third place | 100 m individual medley | 58.11 |

After the Swimming World Cup, Atkinson went on to win two gold and one bronze medal in individual events at the 2018 Swimming World Championships in Hangzhou, China in December. The first medal she won in the competition was a gold medal in the 50-metre breaststroke, swimming a 29.05 and finishing ahead of second-place finisher Rūta Meilutytė. Her next medal was a bronze medal in the 100-metre individual medley, finishing third with a time of 58.11 in the final, less than one second behind Katinka Hosszú and Runa Imai. Atkinson's third and final medal of the competition was a gold medal in the 100-metre breaststroke where she finished before American swimmer Katie Meili with a time of 1:03.51 in the final.

=== 2019 ===
==== 2019 World Aquatics Championships ====
At the 2019 World Aquatics Championships in Gwangju, South Korea in July 2019, Atkinson finished in fourth place with a time of 30.34 in the final of the 50-metre breaststroke.

==== International Swimming League ====
In 2019 Atkinson was a member of the 2019 International Swimming League representing Team Iron. She was a valuable member of the team winning the 50m breaststroke in all 3 matches the team competed in, and she also picked up two wins and one second-place finish in the 100m breaststroke.

=== 2021–2022 ===
==== 2020 Summer Olympics ====
On 14 July 2021, FINA released its entry list for the 2020 Summer Olympics in Tokyo, Japan including that Atkinson was entered to compete in the 100-metre breaststroke. Prior to the start of competition of Jamaican athletes at the 2020 Olympics, the Jamaica Olympic Association saluted its athletes including Atkinson. In the preliminaries of the 100-metre breaststroke on Sunday 25 July, Atkinson swam a 1:07.70, finishing third in her heat, and did not advance to the semifinals. She ranked twenty-second across all the preliminary heats and finished her competition at her fifth and final Olympic Games.

==== International Swimming League ====
The International Swimming League team London Roar selected Atkinson to be a part of their roster for the 2021 International Swimming League. At the end of the 2021 season, Atkinson ranked 17th out of the 488 swimmers who had competed in the International Swimming League since it started in 2019 and earned a positive number of most valuable player points.

==== 2021 World Swimming Championships ====
Atkinson entered to compete in the 50-metre and 100-metre breaststroke at the 2021 World Swimming Championships in Abu Dhabi, United Arab Emirates. Leading up to the start of competition, Atkinson attended the finale of the 2021 Abu Dhabi Grand Prix in Abu Dhabi with Zach Apple, Lydia Jacoby, and Melanie Margalis all of the United States.

On day one of competition, Atkinson tied Qianting Tang of China for first overall in the 50-metre breaststroke before Tang was disqualified, advancing Atkinson as the fastest swimmer to the semifinals with her time of 29.55 seconds. In the semifinals, she was disqualified, which marked the fourteenth disqualification in the preliminaries and semifinals of breaststroke events on day one. The following day, she helped place fourteenth in the 4×50-metre mixed freestyle relay, contributing a split of 25.04 seconds for the second 50 metre freestyle sprint leg of the relay. The third day of competition, she swam a 29.14 for the breaststroke leg of the 4×50-metre mixed medley relay, helping achieve a time of 1:45.62 and rank of seventeenth and not qualifying the relay to the final. She swam a 1:04.88 in the preliminaries of the 100-metre breaststroke on day four, qualifying for the semifinals ranking third. She ranked fourth in the semifinals, qualifying for the final with a time of 1:04.26. In the final she placed fourth, finishing in a time of 1:04.03 and eleven-hundredths of a second behind bronze medalist Mona McSharry of Ireland.

==== Retirement ====
Following her final event at the 2021 World Swimming Championships, Atkinson announced her retirement from swimming competitions in December 2021 via Instagram and said something she was glad she got to end her career with was, "I get to retire with my 2 world records in tact[sic]."

In mid-2022, Atkinson was elected to serve as the chair for a first-ever FINA athlete committee focused on addressing gender and discipline-balance.

She is also a Global Ambassador for Special Olympics International.

== International championships (50 m) ==
| Meet | 50 free | 100 free | 200 free | 50 breast | 100 breast | 200 breast | 50 fly | 100 fly | 200 medley | 400 medley | 4×100 freestyle | 4×100 medley | 4×100 mixed freestyle | 4×100 mixed medley |
|---|---|---|---|---|---|---|---|---|---|---|---|---|---|---|
| PAN 2003 | 8th | | | —N/a | 9th | 12th | —N/a | | 9th | | | | —N/a | —N/a |
| OG 2004 | 44th | | | —N/a | 32nd | | —N/a | | | | | | —N/a | —N/a |
| WC 2005 | | 46th | 45th | 24th | 36th | 36th | 46th | | 27th | 31st | | | —N/a | —N/a |
| CG 2006 | 23rd | 24th | | 9th | 13th | 11th | | | 12th | | | | —N/a | —N/a |
| CAC 2006 | 4th | 12th | | 1st place, gold medalist(s) | 1st place, gold medalist(s) | 2nd place, silver medalist(s) | 1st place, gold medalist(s) | | 1st place, gold medalist(s) | | | | —N/a | —N/a |
| PAN 2007 | 10th | | | —N/a | 8th | 8th | —N/a | 7th | | | | | —N/a | —N/a |
| OG 2008 | | | | —N/a | | 25th | —N/a | | | | | | —N/a | —N/a |
| CAC 2010 | | | | 1st place, gold medalist(s) | 1st place, gold medalist(s) | 1st place, gold medalist(s) | | | 1st place, gold medalist(s) | | | | —N/a | —N/a |
| CG 2010 | | | | 8th | 11th | 10th | | | 12th | | | | —N/a | —N/a |
| PAN 2011 | | | | —N/a | 4th | 4th | —N/a | 7th | 2nd place, silver medalist(s) | | | | —N/a | —N/a |
| OG 2012 | 37th | | | —N/a | 4th | 27th | —N/a | | | | | | —N/a | —N/a |
| WC 2013 | | | | 12th | 9th | 22nd | | | | | | | —N/a | —N/a |
| CG 2014 | | | | 2nd place, silver medalist(s) | 3rd place, bronze medalist(s) | 7th | | | | | | | —N/a | —N/a |
| PAN 2015 | | 11th | | —N/a | 2nd place, silver medalist(s) | 4th | —N/a | | 9th | | 8th | 7th | —N/a | —N/a |
| WC 2015 | | | | 2nd place, silver medalist(s) | 3rd place, bronze medalist(s) | | 31st | | | | | | | |
| OG 2016 | | | | —N/a | 8th | | —N/a | | | | | | —N/a | —N/a |
| CG 2018 | | | | 2nd place, silver medalist(s) | 14th | | 8th | | | | | | —N/a | —N/a |
| CAC 2018 | 3rd place, bronze medalist(s) | 4th | | 1st place, gold medalist(s) | 1st place, gold medalist(s) | | 1st place, gold medalist(s) | 3rd place, bronze medalist(s) | | | | | 5th | 5th |
| WC 2019 | | | | 4th | 11th | | 36th | | | | | | | |
| OG 2020 | | | | —N/a | 22nd | | —N/a | | | | | | —N/a | |

== International championships (25 m) ==
| Meet | 50 free | 100 free | 200 free | 50 breast | 100 breast | 200 breast | 100 medley | 200 medley | 400 medley | 4×50 mixed free | 4×50 mixed medley |
|---|---|---|---|---|---|---|---|---|---|---|---|
| WC 2004 | 39th | 35th | 32nd | 17th | 19th | 24th | 22nd | 21st | 17th | —N/a | —N/a |
| WC 2010 | | | | 6th | 9th | 8th | 41st | | | —N/a | —N/a |
| WC 2012 | | | | 2nd place, silver medalist(s) | 2nd place, silver medalist(s) | 8th | 4th | | | —N/a | —N/a |
| WC 2014 | | | | 2nd place, silver medalist(s) | 1st place, gold medalist(s) | 10th | 4th | | | | |
| WC 2016 | | | | 2nd place, silver medalist(s) | 1st place, gold medalist(s) | 20th | 3rd place, bronze medalist(s) | | | | |
| WC 2018 | | | | 1st place, gold medalist(s) | 1st place, gold medalist(s) | | 3rd place, bronze medalist(s) | | | | |
| WC 2021 | | | | DSQ | 4th | | | | | 14th | 17th |

== Career best times ==
=== Long course metres (50 m pool) ===
| Event | Time | Meet | Location | Date | Notes | Ref |
|---|---|---|---|---|---|---|
| 50 m breaststroke | 30.11 | 2015 World Aquatics Championships | Kazan, Russia | 9 August 2015 | NR | |
| 100 m breaststroke | 1:05.93 | 2015 Swimming World Cup | Dubai, United Arab Emirates | 6 November 2015 | NR | |
| 200 m breaststroke | 2:25.48 | 2014 Commonwealth Games | Glasgow, Scotland | 26 July 2014 | NR | |

Legend: NR – Jamaican record; e – equalled existing record;
Records not set in finals: h – heat; sf – semifinal; r – relay 1st leg; rh – relay heat 1st leg; b – B final; † – en route to final mark; so – swim-off; tt – time trial

=== Short course metres (25 m pool) ===
| Event | Time | Meet | Location | Date | Type | Ref |
|---|---|---|---|---|---|---|
| 50 m breaststroke | 28.56 | 2018 Swimming World Cup | Budapest, Hungary | 6 October 2018 | AM, CR, Former WR | |
| 100 m breaststroke | 1:02.36 | 2014 World Swimming Championships 2016 Swimming World Cup | Doha, Qatar Chartres, France | 6 December 2014 26 August 2016 | =WR =WR | |
| 200 m breaststroke | 2:17.84 | 2014 Swimming World Cup | Singapore, Singapore | 2 November 2014 | NR | |

Legend: WR – World record; AM – Americas record; CR – Commonwealth record; NR – Jamaican record; e – equalled existing record;
Records not set in finals: h – heat; sf – semifinal; r – relay 1st leg; rh – relay heat 1st leg; b – B final; † – en route to final mark; so – swim-off; tt – time trial

== Swimming World Cup circuits ==
The following medals Atkinson has won at Swimming World Cup circuits.

| Edition | Gold medals | Silver medals | Bronze medals | Total |
|---|---|---|---|---|
| 2013 | 12 | 4 | 8 | 24 |
| 2014 | 12 | 5 | 4 | 21 |
| 2015 | 10 | 3 | 5 | 18 |
| 2016 | 14 | 6 | 7 | 27 |
| 2017 | 13 | 2 | 4 | 19 |
| 2018 | 8 | 2 | 0 | 10 |
| 2019 | 5 | 0 | 0 | 5 |
| Total | 74 | 22 | 28 | 124 |

== Worlds records ==
=== Short course metres (25 m pool) ===
| No. | Event | Time | Meet | Location | Date | Type | Status | Duration | Ref |
|---|---|---|---|---|---|---|---|---|---|
| 1 | 100 m breaststroke^{[a]} | 1:02.36 | 2014 World Swimming Championships | Doha, Qatar | 6 December 2014 | =WR | Current | — | |
| 2 | 100 m breaststroke (2)^{[a]} | 1:02.36 | 2016 Swimming World Cup | Chartres, France | 26 August 2016 | =WR | Current | — | |
| 3 | 50 m breaststroke | 28.64 | 2016 Swimming World Cup | Tokyo, Japan | 26 October 2016 | WR | Former | 1 year, 11 months, 10 days | |
| 4 | 50 m breaststroke (2) | 28.56 | 2018 Swimming World Cup | Budapest, Hungary | 6 October 2018 | WR | Former | 4 years, 2 months, 11 days | |

==== Notes ====
^{a} Not recognized as a new world record as it tied a pre-existing world record.

== Awards and honours ==
- 2014 Swammy Award: Central American & Caribbean Female Athlete of the Year.
- 2014 Jamaican Sportsperson of the Year: Swimming.
- 2015 Swammy Award: Central American & Caribbean Female Athlete of the Year.
- 2016 Swammy Award: Central American & Caribbean Female Athlete of the Year.
- In April 2018, Atkinson was selected to serve as the flag-bearer for Jamaica at the 2018 Commonwealth Games, where she was the only swimmer representing the country at the Games.
- In October 2018, Atkinson received the fifth highest honor in Jamaica, the Order of Distinction, Rank of Commander from the Governor General.
- 2018 Swammy Award: Central American & Caribbean Female Athlete of the Year.
- In 2019, Atkinson was inducted into the Texas A&M Athletics Hall of Fame.
- 2019 Swammy Award: Central American & Caribbean Female Athlete of the Year.
- In December 2020, Atkinson was declared a champion ambassador to the Special Olympics with her outreach efforts focused on the Caribbean Community.
- 2020 Swammy Award: Central American & Caribbean Female Athlete of the Year.
- SwimSwam Top 100 (Women's): 2021 (#56).
- In November 2021, Atkinson received an honorary degree, Doctor of Laws, from the University of the West Indies.

== See also ==
- World record progression 50 metres breaststroke
- World record progression 100 metres breaststroke
- List of World Swimming Championships (25 m) medalists (women)
- List of athletes with the most appearances at Olympic Games
- List of Jamaican records in swimming
- List of Texas A&M University people
- Texas A&M Aggies

Records
| Preceded by (Lithuania) Rūta Meilutytė | Women's 100-metre breaststroke world record-holder (short course); 3 December 2014 – present (tied Meilutytė) | Succeeded by Incumbent |
| Preceded by (United States) Jessica Hardy | Women's 50-metre breaststroke world record-holder (short course); 26 October 2016 – 17 December 2022 | Succeeded by (Lithuania) Rūta Meilutytė |
