= South Florida Aquatic Club =

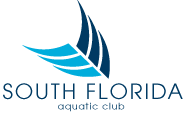

Club information
- Full name: South Florida Aquatic Club
- Nickname(s): SoFLo
- Short name: SoFLo
- City: Pembroke Pines, Florida, United States
- Founded: 2010
- Home pool(s): Pembroke Pines Academic Village Pool

Swimming
- Head coach: Christopher Anderson

South Florida Aquatic Club is a swim club based in Pembroke Pines, Florida, United States. Founded in 2010, it offers training for beginner and elite swimmers. The aquatics club is best known for developing a number of Olympic swimmers.

== Notable swimmers ==
- Alia Atkinson
- Claire Donahue
- Marc Rojas
- Natasha Moodie
