= Swimming at the 2007 Pan American Games – Women's 200 metre butterfly =

The Women's 200m Butterfly event at the 2007 Pan American Games took place at the Maria Lenk Aquatic Park in Rio de Janeiro, Brazil, with the final being swum on July 21.

== Medalists ==
Gold	Kathleen Hersey; United States
Silver	Courtney Kalisz; United States
Bronze	Daiene Dias; Brazil

== Results ==
=== Finals ===
Place	Swimmer	Country	Time	Note
1	Kathleen Hersey	United States	2:07.64	
2	Courtney Kalisz	United States	2:12.75	
3	Daiene Dias	Brazil	2:13.35	
4	Zsofia Balazs	Canada	2:13.99	
5	Prisciliana Escobar	Mexico	2:16.00	
6	Rita Medrano	Mexico	2:17.10	
7	Florencia Chione	Argentina	2:18.42	
8	Maria Rodriguez	Venezuela	2:20.20	

=== Semifinals ===
Rank	Swimmer	Country	Time	Note
1	Kathleen Hersey	United States	2:08.89	Q
2	Courtney Kalisz	United States	2:11.53	Q
3	Prisciliana Escobar	Mexico	2:15.19	Q
4	Zsofia Balazs	Canada	2:16.04	Q
5	Daiene Dias	Brazil	2:16.97	Q
6	María Rodríguez	Venezuela	2:19.04	Q
7	Florencia Ghione	Argentina	2:19.40	Q
8	Rita Medrano	Mexico	2:20.63	Q
9	Larissa Cieslak	Brazil	2:21.04	
10	Daniela Reyes	Chile	2:22.08	
11	María Fernanda Coy	Guatemala	2:22.39	
12	Antonella Scanavino	Uruguay	2:25.16	
13	Marsha Watson	Barbados	2:26.15	
14	Johanna Rodríguez	Costa Rica	2:27.75	
15	Ana Guadalup Hernández	El Salvador	2:29.33	
16	Laura Paz	Honduras	2:32.01	
