= Swimming at the 2020 Summer Olympics – Men's 100 metre freestyle =

Men's 100 metre freestyle at the Games of the XXXII Olympiad
- Venue: Tokyo Aquatics Centre
- Dates: 27 July 2021 (heats); 28 July 2021 (semifinals); 29 July 2021 (final)
- Competitors: 70 from 62 nations
- Winning time: 47.02 OR

Medalists
1st place, gold medalist(s)		Caeleb Dressel	United States
2nd place, silver medalist(s)		Kyle Chalmers	Australia
3rd place, bronze medalist(s)		Kliment Kolesnikov	ROC

The men's 100 metre freestyle event at the 2020 Summer Olympics was held from 27 to 29 July 2021 at the Tokyo Aquatics Centre. There were approximately 60 competitors from approximately 45 nations, with the ultimate numbers determined through the ongoing selection process, including universality places.

== Background ==
It was the event's 28th appearance, having been held at every edition except 1900.

Defending champion Kyle Chalmers of Australia is expected to return, as are fifth-place finisher Duncan Scott of Great Britain and sixth-place finisher Caeleb Dressel of the United States. Dressel is the two-time reigning World Champion (2017 and 2019), with Chalmers the runner-up in 2019.

== Summary ==
Labelled the "next Michael Phelps" following his breakthrough four years ago at the 2017 World Championships, the U.S.' megastar Caeleb Dressel finally won his first individual Olympic title. Dressel used his signature explosive start to gain a strong advantage on the field and touch first at the 50, before narrowly holding on in the final lap to clock a new Olympic record of 47.02.

While Australia's defending Olympic champion Kyle Chalmers stormed home in the last 50, he could not overtake Dressel down the stretch, relegating him to silver by 0.06 seconds. Russia's Kliment Kolesnikov turned first at the halfway mark 0.10 seconds ahead of Dressel, though could not hang on with the finishing speed of Dressel and Chalmers, claiming bronze in 47.44.

French swimmer Maxime Grousset could not emulate the feats of his compatriot Alain Bernard, the 2008 Olympic Champion, slipping off the podium to fourth place. Korea's Hwang Sun-woo (47.82) and Italy's Alessandro Miressi (47.86) followed Grousset in fifth and sixth. Romanian 16-year old David Popovici (48.04) was unable to replicate his stunning 47.30 from earlier in the year, falling to seventh while Hungary's Nandor Nemeth (48.10) rounded out the championship field.

The medals for the competition were presented by Canada's Dick Pound, IOC member, and the gifts were presented by Senegal's Mouhamedou Diop, FINA Bureau Member.

== Qualification ==
The Olympic Qualifying Time for the event is 48.57 seconds. Up to two swimmers per National Olympic Committee (NOC) can automatically qualify by swimming that time at an approved qualification event. The Olympic Selection Time is 50.03 seconds. Up to one swimmer per NOC meeting that time is eligible for selection, allocated by world ranking until the maximum quota for all swimming events is reached. NOCs without a male swimmer qualified in any event can also use their universality place.

== Competition format ==
The competition consists of three rounds: heats, semifinals, and a final. The swimmers with the best 16 times in the heats advance to the semifinals. The swimmers with the best 8 times in the semifinals advance to the final. Swim-offs are used as necessary to break ties for advancement to the next round.

== Records ==
Prior to this competition, the existing world and Olympic records were as follows.

World record	César Cielo (BRA)	46.91	Rome, Italy	30 July 2009
Olympic record	Eamon Sullivan (AUS)	47.05	Beijing, China	13 August 2008

The following record was established during the competition:

Date	Event	Swimmer	Nation	Time	Record
July 29	Final	Caeleb Dressel	United States	47.02	OR

== Schedule ==
The schedule is a three-day schedule, with each round on separate days.

All times are Japan Standard Time (UTC+9)

Date	Time	Round
Tuesday, 27 July 2021	19:00	Heats
Wednesday, 28 July 2021	10:30	Semifinals
Thursday, 29 July 2021	11:37	Final

== Results ==
=== Heats ===
The swimmers with the top 16 times, regardless of heat, advance to the semifinals.

Rank	Heat	Lane	Swimmer	Nation	Time	Notes
1	9	2	Thomas Ceccon	Italy	47.71	Q
2	9	4	Caeleb Dressel	United States	47.73	Q
3	8	4	Kyle Chalmers	Australia	47.77	Q
4	9	5	Alessandro Miressi	Italy	47.83	Q
5	7	4	Kliment Kolesnikov	ROC	47.89	Q
6	7	3	Hwang Sun-woo	South Korea	47.97	Q, NR
7	8	5	Andrey Minakov	ROC	48.00	Q
8	9	6	David Popovici	Romania	48.03	Q
9	9	3	Nándor Németh	Hungary	48.11	Q
10	8	8	Yuri Kisil	Canada	48.15	Q
11	7	5	Zach Apple	United States	48.16	Q
12	8	3	Maxime Grousset	France	48.25	Q
13	8	2	Andrej Barna	Serbia	48.30	Q
14	7	6	Joshua Liendo	Canada	48.34	Q
15	7	2	Roman Mityukov	Switzerland	48.43	Q
16	6	2	Jacob Whittle	Great Britain	48.44	Q
17	9	7	Katsumi Nakamura	Japan	48.48	
18	7	1	Apostolos Christou	Greece	48.50	
18	8	6	He Junyi	China	48.50	
20	7	8	Szebasztián Szabó	Hungary	48.51	
21	6	7	Stan Pijnenburg	Netherlands	48.53	
22	6	6	Dylan Carter	Trinidad and Tobago	48.66	
23	7	7	Mehdy Metella	France	48.68	
24	9	1	Cameron McEvoy	Australia	48.72	
25	8	1	Pedro Spajari	Brazil	48.74	
26	6	4	Damian Wierling	Germany	48.83	
27	6	1	Robin Hanson	Sweden	49.07	
28	5	7	Nikola Miljenić	Croatia	49.25	
29	6	8	Meiron Cheruti	Israel	49.26	
30	5	3	Ali Khalafalla	Egypt	49.31	
30	5	4	Mikel Schreuders	Aruba	49.31	
32	6	5	Gabriel Santos	Brazil	49.33	
33	5	6	Alberto Mestre	Venezuela	49.44	
34	4	5	Ian Ho	Hong Kong	49.49	
35	9	8	Serhiy Shevtsov	Ukraine	49.55	
36	5	8	Luke Gebbie	Philippines	49.64	NR
37	6	3	Oussama Sahnoune	Algeria	49.65	
38	4	4	Artur Barseghyan	Armenia	49.78	NR
39	5	5	Joseph Schooling	Singapore	49.84	
40	4	6	Nikolas Antoniou	Cyprus	50.00	
41	4	7	Khurshidjon Tursunov	Uzbekistan	50.14	
42	4	8	Peter Wetzlar	Zimbabwe	50.31	NR
43	4	2	Samy Boutouil	Morocco	50.37	
44	5	1	Ben Hockin	Paraguay	50.41	
45	5	2	Emir Muratović	Bosnia and Herzegovina	50.43	
46	4	3	Ari-Pekka Liukkonen	Finland	50.48	
47	3	4	Mokhtar Al-Yamani	Yemen	50.52	NR
48	4	1	Matthew Abeysinghe	Sri Lanka	50.62	
49	3	3	Andrew Chetcuti	Malta	51.47	
50	3	6	Yousuf Al-Matrooshi	United Arab Emirates	51.50	
51	3	5	Stefano Mitchell	Antigua and Barbuda	51.64	
52	3	2	Kledi Kadiu	Albania	51.65	
53	3	1	Issa Al-Adawi	Oman	51.81	
54	3	7	Jean Zephir	Saint Lucia	51.94	
55	3	8	Miguel Mena	Nicaragua	51.99	
56	2	4	Danilo Rosafio	Kenya	52.54	
57	2	5	Jagger Stephens	Guam	52.72	
58	2	6	Delron Felix	Grenada	52.99	
59	1	6	Alexander Shah	Nepal	53.41	NR
60	2	3	Mathieu Marquet	Mauritius	53.56	
61	2	2	Boško Radulović	Montenegro	53.60	
62	2	7	Muhammad Haseeb Tariq	Pakistan	53.81	
63	2	1	Atuhaire Ambala	Uganda	54.23	
64	1	3	Olt Kondirolli	Kosovo	54.33	
64	2	8	Belly-Cresus Ganira	Burundi	54.33	NR
66	1	5	Yazan Al-Bawwab	Palestine	54.51	
67	1	4	Andrew Fowler	Guyana	55.23	
68	1	1	Sangay Tenzin	Bhutan	57.57	
69	1	2	Mubal Ibrahim	Maldives	58.37	
70	1	7	Edgar Iro	Solomon Islands	1:00.13	
	8	7	Matthew Richards	Great Britain	DNS	

=== Semifinals ===
The swimmers with the best 8 times, regardless of heat, advanced to the final.

Rank	Heat	Lane	Swimmer	Nation	Time	Notes
1	2	3	Kliment Kolesnikov	ROC	47.11	Q, ER
2	1	4	Caeleb Dressel	United States	47.23	Q
3	1	5	Alessandro Miressi	Italy	47.52	Q
4	1	3	Hwang Sun-woo	South Korea	47.56	Q, AS
5	1	6	David Popovici	Romania	47.72	Q
6	2	5	Kyle Chalmers	Australia	47.80	Q
7	2	2	Nándor Németh	Hungary	47.81	Q, NR
8	1	7	Maxime Grousset	France	47.82	Q
9	2	1	Andrej Barna	Serbia	47.94	NR
10	2	6	Andrey Minakov	ROC	48.03	
11	2	7	Zach Apple	United States	48.04	
12	2	4	Thomas Ceccon	Italy	48.05	
13	1	8	Jacob Whittle	Great Britain	48.11	
14	1	1	Joshua Liendo	Canada	48.19	
15	1	2	Yuri Kisil	Canada	48.31	
16	2	8	Roman Mityukov	Switzerland	48.53	

=== Final ===
Rank	Lane	Swimmer	Nation	Time	Notes
1st place, gold medalist(s)	5	Caeleb Dressel	United States	47.02	OR
2nd place, silver medalist(s)	7	Kyle Chalmers	Australia	47.08	
3rd place, bronze medalist(s)	4	Kliment Kolesnikov	ROC	47.44	
4	8	Maxime Grousset	France	47.72	
5	6	Hwang Sun-woo	South Korea	47.82	
6	3	Alessandro Miressi	Italy	47.86	
7	2	David Popovici	Romania	48.04	
8	1	Nándor Németh	Hungary	48.10	
