= Steve Bultman =

American swimming coach

Biographical details
- Born: circa 1949
- Education: Louisiana State University 1970

Playing career
- 1966–1970: Louisiana State University

Coaching career (HC unless noted)
- 1970–1975: Lynn Park Pirahnas; New Orleans
- 1975–1979 1980–1989: Greater Pensacola AC
- 1979–1980: Nashville Aquatic Club
- 1985: Pan Pacific Games
- 1989–1990: Mission Bay Makos; Boca Raton
- 1990–1991 1969–1970: Louisiana State University; Asst. Coach
- 1991–1995: Dynamo Swim Club; Atlanta
- 1995–1999: University of Georgia; Asst. Coach
- 1999–2024: Texas A&M University
- 1988, 2012: U.S. Olympic Team
- 1985: Pan Pacific Games
- 2001, 09, 15: World University Games Coach
- 2013: World Championships Staff

Accomplishments and honors

Championships
- 4 x Big 12 Conference Championships; 4 x SEC Championships 2016–2019

Awards
- 9 x Conference Coach of the Year

Steve Bultman is a former American competitive swimmer for Louisiana State University and an Olympic and college swim coach best known for coaching the Texas A & M Women's team from 1999 through 2024 where he led them to four Big 10 Conference Championships and four consecutive Southeastern Conference Championships from 2016 to 2019. He coached an exceptional total of 16 Olympians in his career.

He attended Jesuit High School in New Orleans, where he won the State Title for Louisiana in the 50 freestyle. Swimming a 50-yard leg for Jesuit in May, 1964 at the State Championships in Shreveport, he was on a winning 200-yard freestyle relay team that took the Louisiana Boys Prep School State title.

== College era swimming ==
Bultman attended LSU, graduating in 1970, where he obtained a B.A. in psychology, then received a Physical Education certification from Tulane in 1975. He was an LSU letterman in swimming in both 1969, and 1970, and served as an LSU student coach in 1969–70 under Head Coach Layne Jorgensen, when the team had a dual meet record of 9–8. Completing his education in 1979, he obtained an MA in Physical Education from the University of West Florida. Beginning with his senior year in college at LSU, he coached swimming while he was obtaining most of his post-graduate education.

In addition to swimming for LSU, Bultman swam for the Metairie YMCA during his college years, where he performed well in butterfly and freestyle. As early as 1966, swimming multiple strokes for the Metairie YMCA at a Jefferson Community Championship meet he won the 100-yard freestyle in 56.3, the 50-yard butterfly in 26.9, and placed second in the 50-yard back, leading his team to a second place finish. In the summer of 1967, he was named to the All Star team at the Louisiana State Championships for his performance in the 100-yard butterfly.

== Coaching ==
Bultman's coaching history includes a number of Aquatics Clubs, beginning with New Orlean's Lynne Park Pirhanas, the Greater Pensacola Aquatic Club, where he coached three Olympians, the Nashville Aquatic Club, Boca Raton's Mission Bay Makos, and Atlanta's Dynamo Swim Club.

For his first experience as a college coach, Bultman worked as an assistant coach at LSU from 1969 to 1970. He then directed the University of Georgia Swim Team as an assistant coach from 1995 to 1999. He would again be assistant coach at LSU from 1990 to 1991.

== Coaching Texas A&M ==
During Bultman's most accomplished and longest serving coaching tenure with the Women's team at Texas A&M from 1999 to 2024, his swimmers beat every standing school record. He led his teams to four Big 12 Conference team championship trophies, in the years 2007, 2008, 2010 and 2012. From 2016 to 2019, under his direction, A&M claimed four consecutive Southeastern Conference Championships. At the NCAA Championships, Bultman led his Women's Aggie swim teams to 12 top-10 team finishes, and coached six individual national champions, 80 All-Americans and an outstanding total of 16 Olympians.

In 1988, and 2012, he served on the coaching staff for the U.S. Olympic swim Team. In other Olympic coaching years, he served with Estonia's Olympic Team in 2008 and Mexico's Olympic Team in 2016. He helped with the coaching staff for the 1985 Pan Pacific Games, as well as the World University Games in 2001, 2009, and 2015. During the 2013 Fina World Championships, he served on Team USA’s coaching staff.

=== Outstanding swimmers ===
Bultman had an exceptional number of his swimmers attend the Olympics for the U.S. and other countries. He had three of his swimmers from Greater Pensacola Aquatic Club (GPAC) attend the 1988 Seoul Olympics; Beth Barr, Andrea Hayes, and Daniel Watters. In the 2008 Beijing Olympics, he had coached 4x200 freestyle relay gold medalist Christine Marshall at Texas A&M. Bultman had nine of his swimmers from Texas A & M compete in the 2012 Olympic Games in London; Cammile Adams, breaststroke record holder and 2012 Olympic gold medalist Breeja Larson, Triin Aljand (Estonia), Alia Atkinson (Jamaica), Erica Dittmer (Mexico), Liliana Ibanez (Mexico), Rita Medrano (Mexico), Kim Pavlin (Croatia) and Julia Wilkinson (Canada). Other more recent outstanding swimmers included two-time Olympian Beryl Gastadello (France), and three-time Olympian Sydney Pickrem (Canada), who was a winner of a bronze medal in 2020, and competed in the 2024 Paris Olympics.

== Honors ==
Bultman was admitted to the American Swimming Coaches Association Hall of Fame in 2015, having been active as a coach since 1970. During his coaching career, he was a nine time Conference Coach of the Year, and had the unique honor of being named to the College Swim Coaches Association of America's 100 Greatest Coaches of the Century. Nearing the end of his collegiate coaching career at Texas A&M, he was admitted into the highly selective International Swimming Coaches Hall of Fame in 2021.
