= Kim Daniela Pavlin =

Croatian swimmer

Personal information
- Born: April 25, 1992 (age 34) Hartford, Connecticut
- Height: 168 cm (5 ft 6 in)
- Weight: 59 kg (130 lb)
- Spouse: Evan Nathaniel Wasser

Sport
- Sport: Swimming
- Strokes: Backstroke
- Club: Zagrebački plivački klub Zagreb (CRO); Alamo Area Aquatics
- College team: Texas A&M University
- Coach: Steve Bultman (Texas A&M)

Kim Daniela Pavlin (born 25 April 1992) is a Croatian swimmer who attended Texas A&M University and competed for Croatia in the 2012 London Olympics in the 200-metre backstroke.

== High School era swimming ==
Pavlin was born on April 25, 1992, in Hartford, Connecticut to Dubravko and Sanja Pavlin of San Antonio, Texas. She went to San Antonio's Winston Churchill High School, graduating in 2010 where she was coached by Mark Jedow, and in age group swimming by Larry Hough at Alamo Area Aquatics. While a Senior at Churchill High, in the 2010 Class5A State Championships, she placed third in the 200 Individual Medley with a 2:02.39 and fifth in the 100 backstroke with a time of 55.64 and swam backstroke on a winning 200 medley relay. In one of her top High School era performances, in her Junior year in late February 2009, at the 5A State Championships in Austin, she won the 200 Individual Medley with an impressive time of 2:01.50 and placed second in the 100 backstroke with a time of 55.41.

With dual citizenship in Croatia and the United States, Pavlin was a Croatian National Champion six times and a semi-finalist in the European Junior Championship. She qualified for both the 2009 U.S. Open and the 2009 Short Course Nationals.

Majoring in Education, she attended and swam for Texas A&M University under Hall of Fame Coach Steve Bultman at least for her Freshman and Sophomore years. In her Sophomore year at A&M, while swimming anchor, she helped set a new school record in the 400 Medley Relay, and competed in the National Collegiate Athletic Association Championships in both her Freshman and Sophomore years. In her Sophomore year at A&M, at the NCAA's, she swam the 100 back in 53.85, the 200 back in 1:55.31, and the 200 Individual Medley in 1:56.63.

== 2012 Olympics ==
At the 2012 Summer Olympics, she competed in the Women's 200 metre backstroke with a time of 2:15.67, placing sixth in the second preliminary heat, but finishing in 33rd place overall, failing to qualify for the semifinals. The American team's standout Missy Franklin, who swept the backstroke events, won the 200. A total of eight other 2012 Olympic women swimming competitors had trained with her at A&M, including Mexican team members Erica Dittmer and Liliana Ibáñez.

== Personal life ==
Pavlin is married to Evan Nathaniel Wasser.
