= Oreoluwa Cherebin =

Grenadian swimmer (born 1997)

Personal information
- Full name: Oreoluwa Cherebin
- Born: 24 December 1997 (age 28)

Sport
- Country: Grenada
- Sport: Swimming

Oreoluwa Cherebin (PhD) (born 24 December 1997) is a Grenadian swimmer. She competed in the 50 m and 100 m butterfly, 50 m and 100 m breaststroke events at the 2012 FINA World Swimming Championships (25 m). Cherebin also competed in the 50 m breaststroke and 50 m butterfly events at the 2013 World Aquatics Championships. She competed in the 2014 FINA World Swimming Championships (25m) as well as the 2015 and 2017 FINA World Swimming Championships.

In 2016, she competed in the Women's 100 Butterfly at the 2016 Summer Olympics and finished second in the first heat with a recorded time of 1:10.40s but did not progress to latter stages of the competition.

She competed in four events at the 2018 Commonwealth Games.

She defended her PhD in Analytical Chemistry in 2026.
