= Ilaria Bianchi =

Italian swimmer (born 1990)

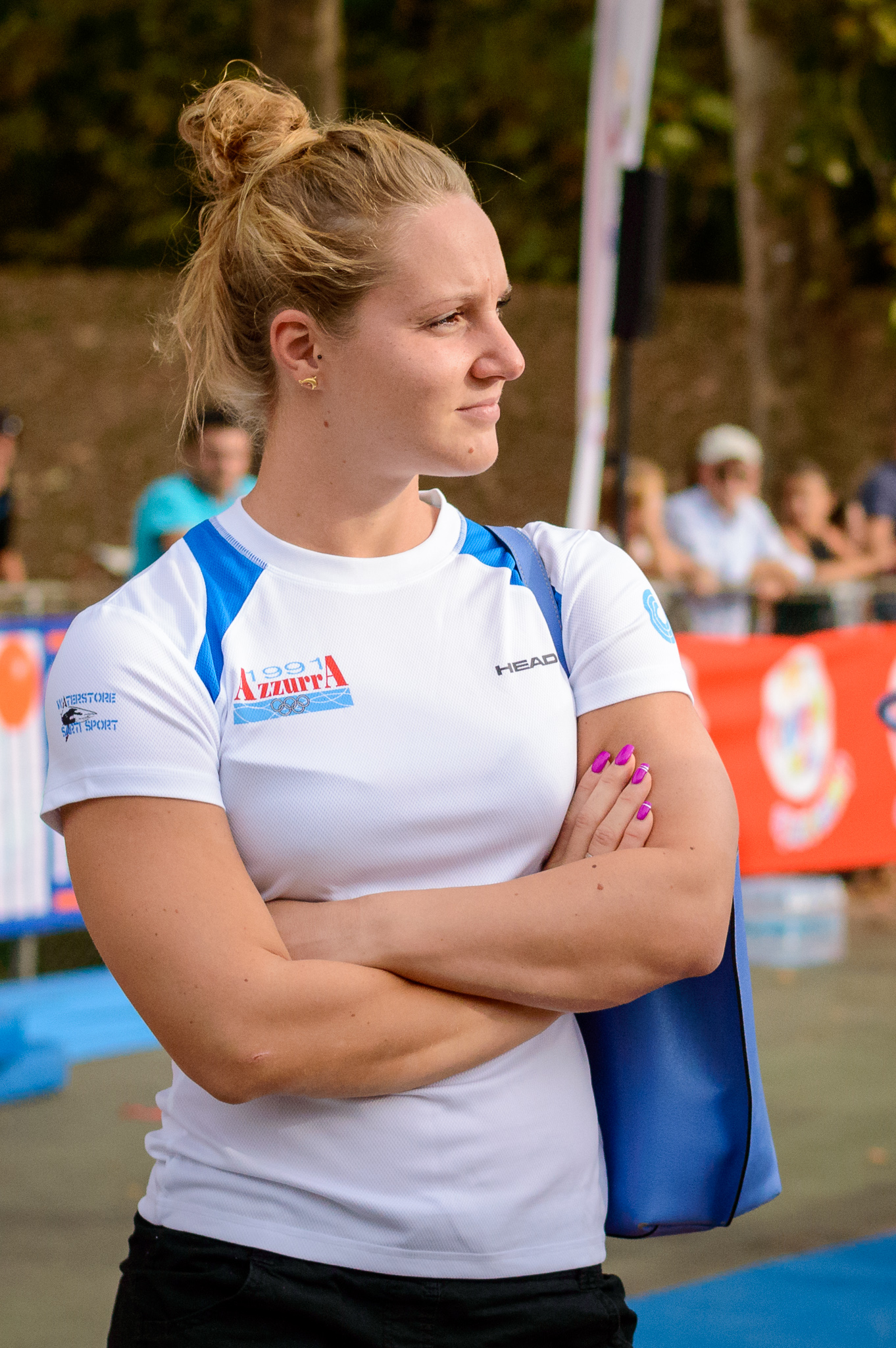

Personal information
- Nationality: Italian
- Born: 6 January 1990 (age 36) Castel San Pietro Terme, Italy
- Height: 1.70 m (5 ft 7 in)
- Weight: 74 kg (163 lb)

Sport
- Sport: Swimming
- Strokes: Butterfly
- Club: Nuoto Club Azzurra 91
- Coach: Fabrizio Bastelli
Medal record
Women's swimming
Representing Italy
World Championships (SC)
Gold medal – first place	2012 Istanbul	100 m butterfly
Bronze medal – third place	2018 Hangzhou	4×100 m medley
European Championships (LC)
Silver medal – second place	2012 Debrecen	4×100 m medley
Silver medal – second place	2016 London	4×100 m medley
Silver medal – second place	2022 Rome	4×100 m mixed medley
Bronze medal – third place	2014 Berlin	100 m butterfly
Bronze medal – third place	2016 London	100 m butterfly
European Championships (SC)
Gold medal – first place	2012 Chartres	100 m butterfly
Silver medal – second place	2017 Copenhagen	200 m butterfly
Silver medal – second place	2019 Glasgow	200 m butterfly
Bronze medal – third place	2011 Szczecin	100 m butterfly
Bronze medal – third place	2013 Herning	4×50 m mixed medley
Mediterranean Games
Gold medal – first place	2013 Mersin	100 m butterfly
Gold medal – first place	2022 Oran	4×100 m medley
Bronze medal – third place	2022 Oran	100 m butterfly
World Junior Championships
Gold medal – first place	2006 Rio de Janeiro	100 m butterfly
Silver medal – second place	2006 Rio de Janeiro	50 m butterfly
European Junior Championships
Silver medal – second place	2005 Budapest	4×100 m medley
Bronze medal – third place	2006 Palma de Mallorca	100 m butterfly

Ilaria Bianchi (born 6 January 1990) is a female Italian Olympics swimmer.

== Biography ==
Bianchi began swimming at a young age and showed great promise early on. She competed in her first national championship at the age of 13 and has since become one of Italy's top swimmers. She specializes in freestyle and butterfly events and has set several records in her home country.

At the international level, Bianchi has competed in the European Championships, the World Championships, and the Olympics. She won her first medal at the European Championships in 2016, where she won bronze in the 4 × 200 m freestyle relay. She also competed in the 2020 Tokyo Olympics and reached the semifinals in the 100m butterfly event. In 2022 European Aquatics championships, she came 4th in team competition.

== See also ==
- Italy at the 2008 Summer Olympics - Swimming
- Italy at the 2012 Summer Olympics - Swimming
- Italy at the 2016 Summer Olympics - Swimming
