= Mokhtar Al-Yamani =

Yemeni swimmer (born 1997)

Personal information
- Born: 12 May 1997 (age 29)

Sport
- Sport: Swimming
- College team: University of Michigan

Mokhtar Al-Yamani (born 12 May 1997) is a Yemeni swimmer. He competed in the men's 100 metre freestyle event at the 2017 World Aquatics Championships. In 2018, he represented Yemen at the 2018 Asian Games held in Jakarta, Indonesia. In 2021, he competed in the men's 100 metre and 200 metre freestyle at the 2020 Summer Olympics in Tokyo, Japan.
