= Swimming at the 2007 Pan American Games – Women's 100 metre butterfly =

The Women's 100m Butterfly event at the 2007 Pan American Games took place at the Maria Lenk Aquatic Park in Rio de Janeiro, Brazil, with the final being swum on July 18.

== Medalists ==
Gold	Kathleen Hersey; United States
Silver	Samantha Woodward; United States
Bronze	Gabriella Silva; Brazil

== Records ==
World Record	Inge de Bruijn (NED)	56.61	2000-09-17	(Australia) Sydney
Pan Am Record	Dana Vollmer (USA)	59.35	2003-08-14	(Dominican Republic) Santo Domingo

== Results ==
=== Finals ===
Place	Swimmer	Country	Time	Note
1	Kathleen Hersey	United States	59.21	GR
2	Samantha Woodward	United States	59.98	
3	Gabriella Silva	Brazil	1:00.50	
4	Daiene Dias	Brazil	1:00.83	
5	Alana Dillette	Bahamas	1:01.50	
6	Arianna Vanderpool-Wallace	Bahamas	1:02.46	
7	Alia Atkinson	Jamaica	1:02.92	
8	Alma Arciniega	Mexico	1:03.79	
