= Rita Medrano =

Mexican swimmer (born 1990)

Personal information
- Full name: Rita Medrano Muñoz
- National team: Mexico
- Born: January 26, 1990 (age 36) Aguascalientes, Mexico
- Height: 1.63 m (5 ft 4 in)
- Weight: 55 kg (121 lb)

Sport
- Sport: Swimming
- Strokes: Butterfly
- Club: Acuatica Nelson Vargas
- College team: Texas A&M University
- Coach: Steve Bultman (Texas A&M)

Rita Medrano Muñoz (born 26 January 1990) is a Mexican competition swimmer who swam for Texas A&M University and competed for Mexico in the 200 meter butterfly event at the 2012 London Olympics.

Medrano was born in Aguascalientes, Mexico on January 26, 1990, and swam for the Acuatica Nelson Vargas Club.

She attended and swam for Texas A&M University under Hall of Fame Head Coach Steve Bultman. As a Freshman swimmer at A&M in April, 2009, she broke the Mexican National record for the 100-meter butterfly with a time of 1:01.38, taking nearly a second off Teresa Victor's prior record of 1:02.37. Medrano held all of Mexico's national records in the butterfly, and also broke the record for the Mexican national title in the 400-meter individual medley with a time of 4:55.17. She also held the record in a relay event.

== 2012 Olympics ==
At the 2012 Summer Olympics in London, she competed in the women's 200-metre butterfly, finishing with a 2:11.42 in 23rd place overall in the heats, failing to qualify for the semifinals. Swimming for the United States, her A&M teammate Cammile Adams finished fifth in the competition with a 2:06.78. Another 2012 Olympian Kim Pavlin of Croatia, who finished 30th in the 200 IM event, had trained with her at Texas A&M. A total of eight other 2012 Olympic women swimmers had trained with her at A&M, including her Mexican Olympic teammates Erica Dittmer and Liliana Ibáñez.
