= Cammile Adams =

American swimmer (born 1991)

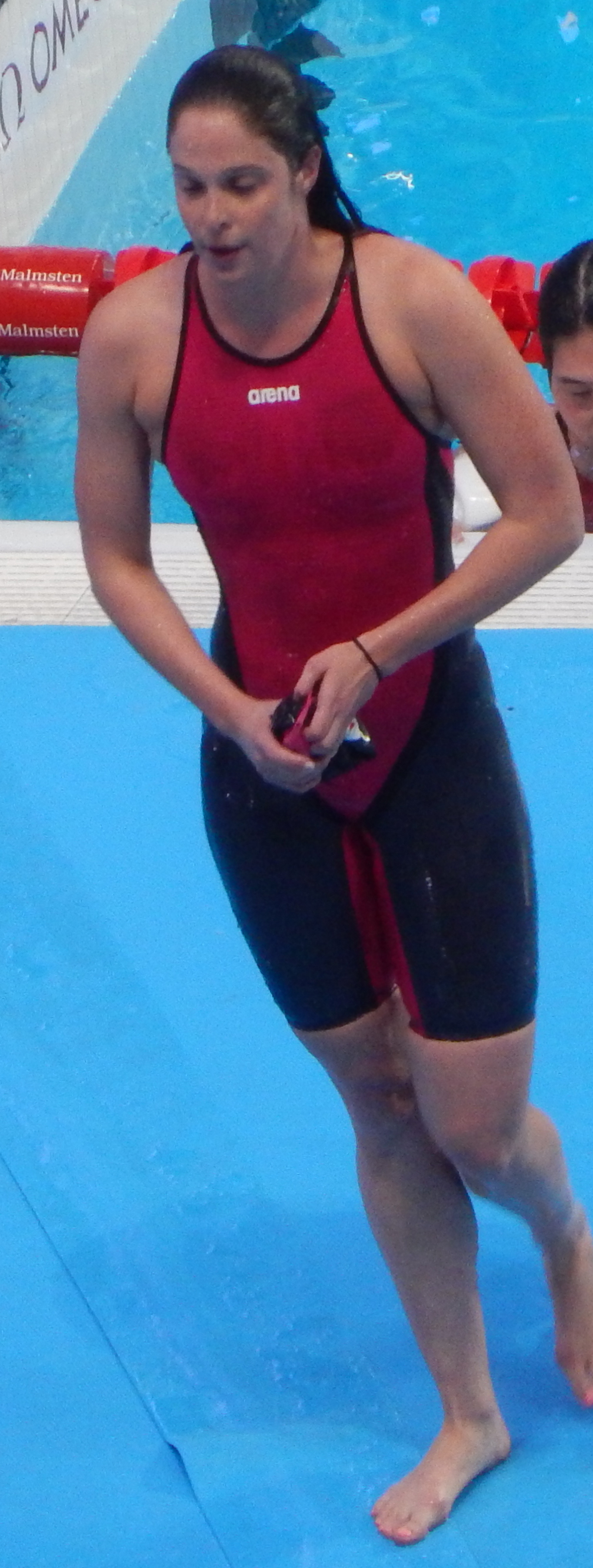

Personal information
- Full name: Natalie Cammile Adams
- Nickname: Cam-cam
- National team: United States
- Born: September 11, 1991 (age 34) Houston, Texas, U.S.
- Height: 5 ft 10 in (178 cm)
- Weight: 143 lb (65 kg)

Sport
- Sport: Swimming
- Strokes: Butterfly, Freestyle
- Club: Aggie Swim Club; SwimMAC Carolina
- College team: Texas A&M University
- Coach: Steve Bultman (Texas A&M)
Medal record
Women's swimming
Representing the United States
World Championships (LC)
Silver medal – second place	2015 Kazan	200 m butterfly
Pan Pacific Championships
Gold medal – first place	2014 Gold Coast	200 m butterfly

Natalie Cammile Adams (born September 11, 1991) is an American competition swimmer who specializes in butterfly events. She represented the United States in the 200-meter butterfly event at the 2012 Summer Olympics and the 2016 Summer Olympics in the same event.

== Career ==
Adams was born in Houston, Texas on September 11, 1991, and graduated from Cypress Woods High School in Cypress, Texas. At 15, at the UIL State Championships at Austin in February, 2007, she placed second in the 100 butterfly with a 55.97 and third in the 500 freestyle. At 17, in July 2009, she placed fourth in the U.S. Nationals at Indianapolis in the women' s 200 Butterfly with a time of 2:10.25. At 18, at the UIL 5A Texas State Championship in February 2010, swimming for Cypress Woods High, she placed only fifth in the 100-yard butterfly with a 54.66, but demonstrating strong endurance training, won the 500-yard freestyle with a time of 4:47.27.

Adams attended Texas A&M University in College Station, Texas, where she swam for the Texas A&M Aggies swimming and diving team in National Collegiate Athletic Association (NCAA) competition from 2011 to 2014 under Hall of Fame head coach Steve Bultman. In four years of swimming for the Aggies, she won four Big 12 individual championships in the 200-yard butterfly, 500-yard freestyle, and 400-yard individual medley (twice). At the 2012 NCAA Women's Swimming and Diving Championships, she finished second in the 200-yard butterfly and was recognized as an All-American. As a senior, Adams won the 200-yard butterfly at the 2014 NCAA Women's Swimming and Diving Championships.

=== Olympics ===
At the 2012 United States Olympic Trials in Omaha, Nebraska, the U.S. qualifying meet for the Olympics, Adams made the U.S. Olympic team for the first time by winning the 200-meter butterfly with the top qualifying time of 2:06.76. Adams also competed in the 400-meter individual medley at the trials, and finished third with a time of 4:38.62. At the 2012 Summer Olympics in London, she finished fifth in the finals of the women's 200-meter butterfly with a time of 2:06.78

To prepare for the 2016 Olympics, she trained with head coach David Marsh at SwimMAC, in Charlotte, North Carolina, who would also direct her as the Head Coach at the 2016 Rio Olympics, and had coached swimming at Auburn University.

At the 2016 Summer Olympics in Rio on August 10, just missing the bronze medal, she finished fourth in the finals of the women's 200-meter butterfly with a career best time of 2:05.90.

Competing in the 200-meter butterfly, her signature event in international competition, in the Pan Pacifics, she won a gold in 2014, and in 2015 won a silver medal in the World Aquatics Championships.

== See also ==
- List of Texas A&M University people
- Texas A&M Aggies
