= Kathleen Hersey =

American swimmer (born 1990)

Personal information
- Full name: Kathleen Elizabeth Hersey
- National team: United States
- Born: February 21, 1990 (age 36) Athens, Georgia, U.S.
- Height: 5 ft 11 in (180 cm)
- Weight: 165 lb (75 kg)

Sport
- Sport: Swimming
- Strokes: Butterfly, individual medley
- Club: Longhorn Aquatics
- College team: University of Texas
Medal record
Women's swimming
Representing the United States
Pan American Games
Gold medal – first place	2007 Rio de Janeiro	100 m butterfly
Gold medal – first place	2007 Rio de Janeiro	200 m butterfly
Gold medal – first place	2007 Rio de Janeiro	400 m medley
Gold medal – first place	2007 Rio de Janeiro	4x100 m medley
Pan Pacific Championships
Bronze medal – third place	2010 Irvine	200 m butterfly

Kathleen Elizabeth Hersey (born February 21, 1990) is an American competition swimmer who represented the United States at the 2008 and 2012 Summer Olympics and finished fourth in the 200-meter butterfly in 2012.

== Early years and education ==
Hersey was born in Athens, Georgia. Hersey is the daughter of Brian and Regina Hersey, who adopted her when she was three days old. Regina Hersey, a former freelance editor, died in January 2012 after a battle with colon cancer. Hersey says she draws inspiration from her father, a financial consultant who has used a wheelchair since the 1980s after a spinal cord aneurysm, but still maintains an active lifestyle. She is a 2008 graduate of Marist School in Atlanta, where she set national high school records in the 100-yard butterfly and 200-yard individual medley.

Hersey was a public relations major at the University of Texas, where she swam for the Texas Longhorns swimming and diving team in 2009 and 2010. During her two years as a Longhorn swimmer, she won eleven Big 12 Conference championships, and was a seven-time All-American. Hersey left the Lady Longhorns swim team after the 2009–10 school year to train individually under Longhorn Aquatics head coach Eddie Reese.

== Career ==
=== 2007–2008 ===
Hersey competed in the 2007 Pan American Games, where she won gold medals in the 100-meter butterfly, 200-meter butterfly, 400-meter individual medley, and 4×100-meter medley relay. Also in 2007, at the U.S. Short Course Nationals, Hersey won the 400-meter individual medley. and placed second in the 200-meter butterfly and 200 individual medley.

Hersey qualified for the 2008 Summer Olympics by placing second in the 200-meter butterfly, her signature event, at the U.S. Olympic Team Trials in Omaha, Nebraska. Additionally, she placed fifth in the final of the 400 m individual medley in Omaha with a career best time of 4:42.07. At the Olympics, Hersey finished eighth in the 200-meter butterfly finals with a time of 2:08.23. She had swum a then career best 2:06.96 in the semi-finals of this event a day earlier. To celebrate her victory, Hersey had a tattoo of Olympic rings inscribed on her shoulder.

=== 2009 ===
At the 2009 USA Swimming National Championships, Hersey won the 200-meter butterfly in a new career best time of 2:06.44, earning a place on the 2009 World Championships roster. Hersey also placed fifth in the 100 m butterfly in 58.36. At the 2009 World Aquatics Championships in Rome, Hersey placed ninth overall in 2:06.89, barely missing a place in the final.

=== 2010–2011 ===
Hersey won a bronze medal in the 200-meter butterfly at the 2010 Pan Pacific Swimming Championships.

In 2011, Hersey won the 200-meter butterfly at the USA Swimming National Championships. She also placed first in the event at the 2011 Duel in the Pool.

=== 2012 Summer Olympics ===
At the 2012 United States Olympic Trials in Omaha, Nebraska, the U.S. qualifying meet for the Olympics, Hersey made the U.S. Olympic team for the second time by finishing second in the 200-meter butterfly behind Cammile Adams with a time of 2:07.72. Hersey also competed in the 200-meter freestyle but did not advance past the semi-finals, and placed third in the 100-meter butterfly final. To celebrate her victory, Hersey had a tattoo of Olympic rings inscribed on her

At the 2012 Summer Olympics in London, Hersey advanced to the finals of the 200-meter butterfly and swam a career-best time of 2:05.78 to finish in fourth place.

=== 2015 - present ===
In 2015, Hersey was inducted into the Georgia Aquatic Hall of Fame.

In 2017, swimmer Madisyn Cox went 4:01.15 in the 400 IM, making her the 10th fastest USA swimmer ever in the event and besting the record held by Hersey. That conference record had stood at 4:01.91 when Hersey set it back in 2009.

== See also ==
- List of United States records in swimming
- List of University of Texas at Austin alumni
- Texas Longhorns
