= Nao Kobayashi =

Japanese swimmer (born 1993)

Personal information
- Nationality: Japanese
- Born: 27 October 1993 (age 32)

Sport
- Sport: Swimming
Medal record
Representing Japan
Summer Universiade
Silver medal – second place	2013 Kazan	200m butterfly
Bronze medal – third place	2013 Kazan	100m butterfly

Nao Kobayashi (born 27 October 1993) is a Japanese swimmer. She competed in the women's 200 metre butterfly event at the 2018 FINA World Swimming Championships (25 m), in Hangzhou, China.
