= Runa Imai =

Japanese swimmer (born 2000)

Personal information
- Full name: 今井月
- National team: Japan
- Born: August 15, 2000 (age 25) Gifu, Japan
- Height: 163 cm (5 ft 4 in)
- Weight: 50 kg (110 lb)

Sport
- Sport: Swimming
- Strokes: Freestyle, individual medley, breaststroke
- Club: Toyokawa High School
- Coach: Masataka Fukada (club); Norimasa Hirai (national)
Medal record
Representing Japan
World Championships (SC)
Silver medal – second place	2018 Hangzhou	100 m medley
Asian Games
Bronze medal – third place	2022 Hangzhou	200 m breaststroke
Asian Championships
Silver medal – second place	2016 Tokyo	200 m medley
Universiade
Silver medal – second place	2019 Naples	4×100 m freestyle
Silver medal – second place	2019 Naples	4×100 m medley
Bronze medal – third place	2019 Naples	200 m medley
World Junior Championships
Bronze medal – third place	2015 Singapore	4×100 m medley
Junior Pan Pacific Championships
Gold medal – first place	2014 Maui	200 m breaststroke
Silver medal – second place	2014 Maui	4×100 m medley
Bronze medal – third place	2014 Maui	100 m breaststroke

Runa Imai (今井 月, Imai Runa; born August 15, 2000) is a Japanese swimmer. She qualified for the 2016 Summer Olympics in Rio de Janeiro in the 200 meter individual medley. She swam the 11th best time in the heats and qualified for the semifinals, where she was eliminated with a 15th-place finish.

Imai took up swimming aged three following her elder brother Hikaru, who is also a competitive swimmer. Her mother died in 2008.

As a 14-year-old at the 2014 Junior Pan Pacific Swimming Championships in Hawaii, United States, Imai won the gold medal in the 200 metre breaststroke with a time of 2:26.04, the bronze medal in the 100 metre breaststroke with a 1:09.25, and the silver medal in the 4×100 metre medley relay, splitting a 1:08.18 to contribute to the final time of 4:04.11.
