= Claire Donahue =

American swimmer (born 1989)

Personal information
- Full name: Claire Christine Donahue
- National team: United States
- Born: January 12, 1989 (age 37) Dallas, Texas, U.S.
- Height: 5 ft 7 in (1.70 m)
- Weight: 139 lb (63 kg)

Sport
- Sport: Swimming
- Strokes: Butterfly
- Club: South Florida Aquatic Club
- College team: Western Kentucky University
- Coach: Chris Anderson
Medal record
Women's swimming
Representing the United States
Olympic Games
Gold medal – first place	2012 London	4×100 m medley
World Championships (LC)
Gold medal – first place	2013 Barcelona	4×100 m medley
World Championships (SC)
Silver medal – second place	2014 Doha	4×50 m medley
Bronze medal – third place	2012 Istanbul	4×100 m medley
Pan American Games
Gold medal – first place	2011 Guadalajara	100 m butterfly
Gold medal – first place	2011 Guadalajara	4×100 m medley

Claire Christine Donahue (born January 12, 1989) is an American competition swimmer. She won two gold medals at the 2011 Pan American Games and finished second at the 2011 National Championships in the 100-meter butterfly. She earned a gold medal for swimming in the preliminary heats of the 4×100-meter medley relay at the 2012 Summer Olympics.

== Early life ==
Donahue was born January 12, 1989, to Christopher and Connie Donahue in Dallas, Texas. As a young child, her family moved to Lenoir City, Tennessee, where she grew up. She has three siblings (Audrey, Zack, and Dean), and graduated from Lenoir City High School. In high school, she was a four-year letterwinner in swimming, a three-year letterwinner in track and field, and a two-year letterwinner in cross country running.

== Swimming career ==
After high school, she attended Western Kentucky University. In her first year, she broke the school record in the 100- and 200-yard butterfly. She was a letterwinner all four years of her college career, setting five school records in the process. As a senior, she was named "2011 WKU Student Athlete of the Year." Donahue graduated from WKU with a BS in social work in May 2011.

Donahue qualified for the 2008 Olympic Trials in the 100-meter and 200-meter butterfly, but did not advance out of the opening round in either event. In 2010, Donahue finished fourth in the 100-yard butterfly at the NCAA Championships. In 2011, she finished second at the Championships in the same event. She went to the 2011 Pan American Games where she won the gold in the 100-meter butterfly and as part of the 4×100-meter medley relay. At the 2011 National Championships, she took second place in 100-meter butterfly and 11th in the 200-meter butterfly.

At the 2012 Olympic Trials in Omaha, Nebraska, the U.S. qualifying event for the Olympics, Donahue turned in a new personal best in the 100-meter butterfly finals clocking a time of 57.57. Her time was significantly slower than Dana Vollmer who won the event with a time of 56.50, but was good enough for second place, qualifying her for the Olympics. "It feels unbelievable to make it to the 2012 Olympics," she remarked. "When I finished and saw that I was second, I did not even know what to think. At first I didn't believe it." She also competed in the 200-meter butterfly, where she failed to advance past the opening round.

At the 2012 Summer Olympics in London, she turned in a personal best time of 57.42 seconds during the semi-finals of the 100-meter butterfly and advanced to the finals. In the finals, she swam the race in 57.48 en route to a seventh-place finish. "My goal was actually just to get in the finals, and once I got that it was just kind of icing on the cake being able to compete in the finals", she remarked. "So I'm thrilled. I'm so happy with how I've done." Later at the games, she swam the butterfly leg of the 4×100-meter medley relay for the U.S. team during the preliminary heats. Her teammates won the relay final, earning Donahue a gold medal.

In recognition of her success at the Olympic Games, her hometown, Lenoir City, Tennessee, dedicated a new public swimming pool in her honor as the Claire Donahue Aquatic Center.

Donahue is coached by WKU swimming head coach Bruce Marchionda. Donahue also trains temporarily at South Florida Aquatic Club.

== Athlete Development Program ==
Claire Donahue created her Athlete Development program in 2018. Services offered by the program include Online Classes, Swim Lessons, Public Speaking, and Swim Clinics. She created this program to help athletes that need help with the mental aspects of the sport and also to bring awareness to mental health in sports.

== See also ==
- List of Olympic medalists in swimming (women)
- Western Kentucky Hilltoppers and Lady Toppers
