= Nooran Ba Matraf =

Yemeni swimmer (born 1999)

Personal information
- Born: November 25, 1999 (age 26)

Sport
- Sport: Swimming
- Strokes: Butterfly
- Club: Stingrays Swimming

Nooran Bamatraf (born November 25, 1999) is a US-born Yemeni swimmer. She competed at the 2016 Summer Olympics in the women's 100 metre butterfly event, the only female swimmer representing Yemen. Her time of 1:11.16 in the heats did not qualify her for the semifinals. She represented Yemen again at the 2020 Tokyo Olympics in the women's 100 metre breaststroke. She studied Kinesiology at DePauw University and swims under Tracy Menzel as well as swimming for Stingrays Swimming, swimming under coaches Ian Goss and Michael Söderlund.
