= List of Jamaican records in swimming =

The Jamaican Records in Swimming are the fastest times ever swum by a swimmer representing Jamaica. These records are kept by Jamaica's national swimming federation: the Amateur Swimming Association of Jamaica (ASAJ).

Records are recognized for males and females in the following long course (50m) and short course (25m) events:

- freestyle: 50, 100, 200, 400, 800 and 1500;
- backstroke: 50, 100 and 200;
- breaststroke: 50, 100 and 200;
- butterfly: 50, 100 and 200;
- individual medley (I.M.): 100 (25m only), 200 and 400;
- relays: 4x50 free (25m only), 4x100 free, 4x200 free, 4x50 medley (25m only), and 4x100 medley.

All records were set in finals unless noted otherwise.

== Long Course (50 m) ==
=== Men ===
Event	Time		Name	Club	Date	Meet	Location	Ref
50 m freestyle	22.77		Justin Plaschka	Jamaica	2 July 2016	CISC	Nassau, Bahamas	
100 m freestyle	50.09	h	Sion Brinn	Jamaica	22 July 1996	Olympic Games	Atlanta, United States	
200 m freestyle	1:50.00	h	Michael Gunning	Jamaica	24 July 2017	World Championships	Budapest, Hungary	
400 m freestyle	3:55.00	h	Michael Gunning	London Aquatics	14 April 2015	British Championships	London, Great Britain	
800 m freestyle	8:52.16		Charles McIntosh	Jamaica	12 August 2026	Pan Pacific Championships	Irvine, United States	
1500 m freestyle	16:40.15		Dominic Walter	Jamaica	30 June 2010	Caribbean Island Swimming Championships	Havana, Cuba	
50 m backstroke	26.47		Timothy Wynter	Jamaica	29 June 2016	CISC	Nassau, Bahamas	
100 m backstroke	55.78		Keanan Dols	Jamaica	25 July 2018	23rd CAC-Barranquilla Games	Colombia	
200 m backstroke	2:03.05		Keanan Dols	Jamaica	2 July 2016	CISC	Nassau, Bahamas	
50 m breaststroke	27.99	h	Kito Campbell	Unattached	2 May 2025	TYR Pro Swim Series	Fort Lauderdale, United States	
100 m breaststroke	1:01.53		Collin McKenzie	Jamaica	10 August 2025	Junior Pan American Games	Asunción, Paraguay	
200 m breaststroke	2:16.67	h	Collin McKenzie	Jamaica	12 August 2025	Junior Pan American Games	Asunción, Paraguay	
50m butterfly	24.21		Justin Plaschka	Jamaica	30 June 2016	CISC	Nassau, Bahamas	
100m butterfly	53.24	h	Josh Kirlew	Enfield Swim Squad	17 April 2026	British Championships	London, United Kingdom	
200m butterfly	1:58.55		Michael Gunning	Stockport	27 July 2016	British Championships	United Kingdom	
200m individual medley	2:03.10	b	Keanan Dols	Jamaica	11 April 2021	TYR Pro Swim Series	Mission Viejo, United States	
200m individual medley	2:02.15	tt, #	Keanan Dols	Gator Swim Club	9 April 2021	TYR Pro Swim Series	Mission Viejo, United States	
400m individual medley	4:27.98		Andrew Phillips	Jamaica	30 July 1984	Olympic Games	Los Angeles, United States	
4×50m freestyle relay	1:37.59		Nathaniel Thomas (24.25); Devaughn Robe; Nelson Denny; Zachary Jackson-Blaine	Jamaica	19 April 2022	CARIFTA Championships	Bridgetown, Barbados	
4×100m freestyle relay	3:29.20		Nathaniel Thomas (51.18); Brady Lewison (54.16); Josh Kirlew (52.12); Benjamin Davis (51.74)	Jamaica	29 July 2026	CAC Games	Santo Domingo, Dominican Republic	
4×200m freestyle relay	7:57.76		Dominic Lee; Brad Hamilton; Travis Forte; Jonathan Wong	Jamaica	28 July 2006	Central American and Caribbean Games	Cartagena, Colombia, Colombia	
4×100m medley relay	3:58.42		Brady Lewison (1:01.27); Benjamin Davis (1:07.42); Josh Kirlew (57.71); Nathaniel Thomas (52.02)	Jamaica	1 August 2026	CAC Games	Santo Domingo, Dominican Republic	

Legend: # – Record awaiting ratification by ASAJ; WR – World record; AM – Americas record;
Records not set in finals: h – heat; sf – semifinal; r – relay 1st leg; rh – relay heat 1st leg; b – B final; † – en route to final mark; so – swim-off; tt – time trial

=== Women ===
Event	Time		Name	Club	Date	Meet	Location	Ref
50m freestyle	25.47		Alia Atkinson	Jamaica	25 July 2018	CAC Games	Barranquilla, Colombia	
100m freestyle	55.35		Alia Atkinson	South Florida Aquatic Club	28 January 2015	FGC Championships	Coral Springs, United States	
200m freestyle	2:01.11	h	Janelle Atkinson	–	3 August 1999	Pan American Games	Winnipeg, Canada	
400m freestyle	4:08.79	h	Janelle Atkinson	–	17 September 2000	Olympic Games	Sydney, Australia	
800m freestyle	8:34.51	h	Janelle Atkinson	–	21 September 2000	Olympic Games	Sydney, Australia	
1500m freestyle	16:22.12		Janelle Atkinson	BSST	22 June 2000	Santa Clara Invitational	Santa Clara, United States	
50m backstroke	29.77	h	Carolyn Levy-Powell	Jamaica	19 April 2025	CARIFTA Championships	Couva, Trinidad and Tobago	
100m backstroke	1:04.04		Alia Atkinson	South Florida Aquatic Club	12 March 2016	Southern Sectional Championships	Plantation, United States	
200m backstroke	2:23.58		Solana Capalbo	–	27 April 2019	Puerto Rico International Swimming Open	Puerto Rico	
50m breaststroke	30.11		Alia Atkinson	Jamaica	9 August 2015	World Championships	Kazan, Russia	
100m breaststroke	1:05.93		Alia Atkinson	Jamaica	6 November 2015	World Cup	Dubai, United Arab Emirates	
200m breaststroke	2:25.48		Alia Atkinson	South Florida Aquatic Club	26 July 2014	Commonwealth Games	Glasgow, Great Britain	
50m butterfly	26.54	h	Alia Atkinson	Jamaica	21 July 2018	CAC Games	Barranquilla, Colombia	
100m butterfly	59.94		Alia Atkinson	South Florida Aquatic Club	7 July 2017	Southern Zone South Sectional Championships	Barranquilla, Colombia	
200m butterfly	2:18.78		Janelle Atkinson	–	7 July 2001	Central American and Caribbean Championships	Santo Domingo, Dominican Republic	
200m individual medley	2:14.75		Alia Atkinson	–	18 October 2011	Pan American Games	Guadalajara, Mexico	
400m individual medley	4:53.62		Zara Bailey	–	27 June 2013	British Championships	Great Britain	
4×50m freestyle relay	1:47.91		Mackenzie Headley (26.56); Morgan Cogle (27.40); Leanna Wainwright (27.20); Sabrina Lyn (26.75)	Jamaica	19 April 2022	CARIFTA Championships	Bridgetown, Barbados	
4×100m freestyle relay	3:53.58		Alia Atkinson; Janelle Atkinson; Angela Chuck; Tamara Swaby	Jamaica	13 August 2003	Pan American Games	Santo Domingo, Dominican Republic	
4×200m freestyle relay	8:41.81		Janelle Atkinson; Tamara Swaby; Amelia Thompson; Angela Chuck	Jamaica	4 July 2004	–		
4×100m medley relay	4:14.58		Danielle Boothe (1:05.89); Alia Atkinson (1:07.05); Trudian Patrick (1:04.30); Breanna Roman (57.34)	Jamaica	18 July 2015	Pan American Games	Toronto, Canada	

Legend: # – Record awaiting ratification by ASAJ; WR – World record; AM – Americas record;
Records not set in finals: h – heat; sf – semifinal; r – relay 1st leg; rh – relay heat 1st leg; b – B final; † – en route to final mark; so – swim-off; tt – time trial

=== Mixed relay ===
Event	Time	Name	Club	Date	Meet	Location	Ref
4×50 m freestyle relay	1:43.47	Justin Plaschka (24.37); Michelle Dols (28.29); Breanna Roman (24.01); Sidrell Williams (26.80)	Jamaica	29 June 2016	CISC	Nassau, Bahamas	
4×100 m freestyle relay	3:38.90	Nathaniel Thomas (51.39); Benjamin Davis (50.85); Carolyn Levy (59.48); Leah Chin (57.18)	Jamaica	31 July 2026	CAC Games	Santo Domingo, Dominican Republic	
4×50 m medley relay							
4×100 m medley relay	3:57.42	Collin McKenzie (56.82); Kito Campbell (1:03.10); Jessica Calderbank (1:00.57); Sabrina Lyn (56.93)	Jamaica	28 July 2026	Commonwealth Games	Glasgow, United Kingdom	

Legend: # – Record awaiting ratification by ASAJ; WR – World record; AM – Americas record;
Records not set in finals: h – heat; so – swim-off

== Short Course (25 m) ==
=== Men ===
Event	Time		Name	Club	Date	Meet	Location	Ref
50m freestyle	22.06	h	Nathaniel Thomas	Jamaica	14 December 2024	World Championships	Budapest, Hungary	
100m freestyle	48.66	h	Sion Brinn	Jamaica	19 April 1997	World Championships	Gothenburg, Sweden	
200m freestyle	1:48.28		Michael Gunning	East London	11 November 2017	BUCS Championships	Sheffield, Great Britain	
400m freestyle	3:53.08		Michael Gunning	-	18 November 2017	Stockport Metro Open Meet	Stockport, United Kingdom	
400m freestyle	3:50.17	not ratified or later rescinded	Michael Gunning	-	6 December 2016	Manchester International Meet	Manchester, United Kingdom	
800m freestyle	8:42.60		Dominic Walter	-	25 January 2015			
1500m freestyle	15:58.43		Dominic Walter	-	12 February 2016	Ontario Universities Championships		
50m backstroke	25.01	h	Justin Plaschka	Jamaica	8 December 2016 (Note: by official result source; 9 December 2016 by ASAJ source, a typo)	World Championships	Windsor, Canada	
100m backstroke	55.39	h	Keanan Dols	Jamaica	6 December 2016	World Championships	Windsor, Canada	
200m backstroke	2:03.72		Cameron Chow	-	21 February 2015	Speedo CIS Championships		
200m backstroke	1:59.43	h, not ratified or later rescinded	Keanan Dols	Jamaica	11 December 2016	World Championships	Windsor, Canada	
50m breaststroke	28.82	h	Benjamin Davis	Jamaica	14 December 2025	Swim England National Winter Championships	Sheffield, United Kingdom	
100m breaststroke	1:07.20	h	Dominic Lee	Jamaica	7 October 2004	World Championships	Indianapolis, United States	
200m breaststroke	2:42.67		Brad Hamilton	Tornadoes	25 October 2003			
50m butterfly	23.92	h	Justin Plaschka	Jamaica	9 December 2016	World Championships	Windsor, Canada	
100m butterfly	52.31	h	Justin Plaschka	Jamaica	7 December 2016	World Championships	Windsor, Canada	
200m butterfly	2:00.07		Michael Gunning	-	18 November 2017	Stockport Metro Open Meet	Stockport, United Kingdom	
200m butterfly	1:58.60	h, not ratified or later rescinded	Michael Gunning	-	6 December 2014	London Winter Championship	London, Great Britain	
100m individual medley	57.45	h	Keanan Dols	Jamaica	8 December 2016	World Championships	Windsor, Canada	
100m individual medley	57.33	not ratified or later rescinded	Sion Brinn	Jamaica	1997	World Cup	Beijing, China	
200m individual medley	2:02.06 (Note: by official result source; 2:04.93 by ASAJ source, a typo)	h	Keanan Dols	Jamaica	6 December 2016	World Championships	Windsor, Canada	
400m individual medley	4:29.83		Dominic Walter	-	7 February 2013	Ontario Universities Championships		
4×50m freestyle relay	1:43.94		L. Lowe; J. Smith; T. Johnson	Y Speedos	26 October 2002			
4×100m freestyle relay								
4×200m freestyle relay								
4×50m medley relay	1:54.94		T. Johnson; L. Lowe; P. Peat; J. Smith	Y Speedos	27 October 2002			
4×100m medley relay								

Legend: # – Record awaiting ratification by ASAJ; WR – World record; AM – Americas record;
Records not set in finals: h – heat; sf – semifinal; r – relay 1st leg; rh – relay heat 1st leg; b – B final; † – en route to final mark; so – swim-off; tt – time trial

=== Women ===
Event	Time		Name	Club	Date	Meet	Location	Ref
50 m freestyle	24.65		Alia Atkinson	Jamaica	29 September 2014	World Cup	Hong Kong, Hong Kong	
100 m freestyle	56.41		Janelle Atkinson	-	5 December 1998	US OPEN	United States	
100 m freestyle	56.16	h, not ratified or later rescinded	Alia Atkinson	Jamaica	27 August 2016	World Cup	Chartres, France	
200 m freestyle	2:00.90		Janelle Atkinson	-	4 December 1998	US OPEN	United States	
400 m freestyle	4:07.91		Janelle Atkinson	-	3 December 1998	US OPEN	United States	
800 m freestyle	8:31.29		Janelle Atkinson	-	5 December 1998	US OPEN	United States	
1500 m freestyle								
50m backstroke	27.37		Alia Atkinson	Jamaica	29 September 2014	World Cup	Hong Kong, Hong Kong	
100m backstroke	1:04.18	h	Leanna Wainwright	Jamaica	10 December 2024	World Championships	Budapest, Hungary	
200m backstroke	2:43.20		Tracey Hill	Y Speedos	26 October 2003			
50m breaststroke	28.56	AM, CR	Alia Atkinson	Jamaica	6 October 2018	World Cup	Budapest, Hungary	
100m breaststroke	1:02.36	=, =WR	Alia Atkinson	Jamaica	6 December 2014	World Championships	Doha, Qatar	
100m breaststroke	1:02.36	=, =WR	Alia Atkinson	Jamaica	26 August 2016	World Cup	Chartres, France	
200m breaststroke	2:17.84		Alia Atkinson	Jamaica	2 November 2014	World Cup	Singapore, Singapore	
50m butterfly	25.86		Alia Atkinson	Jamaica	31 August 2016	World Cup	Berlin, Germany	
100m butterfly	57.13		Alia Atkinson	London Roar	14 November 2020	International Swimming League	Budapest, Hungary	
200m butterfly	2:14.56		Vanessa Treasure	-	20 February 2015			
100m individual medley	57.84		Alia Atkinson	Jamaica	27 August 2016	World Cup	Chartres, France	
200m individual medley	2:07.30		Alia Atkinson	Jamaica	20 October 2013	World Cup	Doha, Qatar	
400m individual medley	4:39.83		Vanessa Treasure	Jamaica	19 February 2015	-		
4×50m freestyle relay	2:02.55			Tornadoes	10 October 2003			
4×100m freestyle relay								
4×200m freestyle relay								
4×50m medley relay	2:15.57			Y Speedos	26 October 2002			
4×100m medley relay								

Legend: # – Record awaiting ratification by ASAJ; WR – World record; AM – Americas record; CR – Commonwealth record;
Records not set in finals: h – heat; sf – semifinal; r – relay 1st leg; rh – relay heat 1st leg; b – B final; † – en route to final mark; so – swim-off; tt – time trial
