= 2016 FINA World Swimming Championships (25 m) – Men's 100 metre butterfly =

Men's 100 metre butterfly at the 2016 FINA World Swimming Championships (25 m)
- Venue: WFCU Centre
- Dates: 7 December (heats and semifinals); 8 December (final)
- Competitors: 88 from 65 nations
- Winning time: 48.08 WR

Medalists
gold medal	Chad le Clos	South Africa
silver medal	Tom Shields	United States
bronze medal	David Morgan	Australia

The Men's 100 metre butterfly competition of the 2016 FINA World Swimming Championships (25 m) was held on 7 and 8 December 2016.

== Records ==
Prior to the competition, the existing world and championship records were as follows.

	Name	Nation	Time	Location	Date
World record Championship record	Chad le Clos	South Africa	48.44	Doha	4 December 2014

The following records were established during the competition:

Date	Event	Name	Nation	Time	Record
8 December	Final	Chad le Clos	South Africa	48.08	WR

== Results ==
=== Heats ===
The heats were held at 10:49.

Rank	Heat	Lane	Name	Nationality	Time	Notes
1	10	4	Tom Shields	United States	50.03	Q
2	10	3	Matthew Josa	United States	50.51	Q
3	9	4	Chad le Clos	South Africa	50.52	Q
4	10	5	David Morgan	Australia	50.58	Q
5	8	4	Adam Barrett	Great Britain	50.63	Q
6	9	3	Jérémy Stravius	France	50.70	Q
7	8	2	Daniil Pakhomov	Russia	50.84	Q
8	9	5	Takeshi Kawamoto	Japan	50.89	Q
9	10	2	Aleksandr Kharlanov	Russia	50.94	Q
10	8	3	Pavel Sankovich	Belarus	50.99	Q
10	8	5	Mehdy Metella	France	50.99	Q
12	8	1	Li Zhuhao	China	51.02	Q
13	1	3	Mark Szaranek	Great Britain	51.35	Q
14	8	6	Marius Kusch	Germany	51.36	Q
15	10	6	Tommaso D'Orsogna	Australia	51.48	Q
16	9	6	Yauhen Tsurkin	Belarus	51.56	Q
17	9	7	Jan Šefl	Czech Republic	51.62	
18	9	2	Daiya Seto	Japan	51.66	
19	9	1	Andrii Khloptsov	Ukraine	51.72	
20	9	8	Deividas Margevičius	Lithuania	51.96	
21	10	7	Viktor Bromer	Denmark	52.29	
22	5	3	Justin Plaschka	Jamaica	52.31	NR
23	10	1	Jesper Björk	Sweden	52.33	
24	8	7	Riku Pöytäkivi	Finland	52.38	
25	8	9	Giacomo Carini	Italy	52.43	
26	9	0	Mislav Sever	Croatia	52.46	
27	8	8	Louis Croenen	Belgium	52.48	
28	7	2	Mackenzie Darragh	Canada	52.50	
29	10	0	Tamás Kenderesi	Hungary	52.69	
30	9	9	Benjamin Hockin	Paraguay	52.71	
30	10	9	Antani Ivanov	Bulgaria	52.71	NR
32	7	4	Tomáš Havránek	Czech Republic	52.87	
33	6	1	Daniel Carranza	Mexico	52.92	
34	6	5	Sajan Prakash	India	52.93	NR
35	10	8	Ng Chun Nam Derick	Hong Kong	53.02	
36	5	2	Marcos Barale	Argentina	53.09	
37	7	5	Oussama Sahnoune	Algeria	53.23	NR
38	7	0	Adam Halas	Slovakia	53.27	
39	6	2	Ralph Goveia	Zambia	53.63	
40	7	9	Alard Basson	South Africa	54.00	
41	7	8	Ivan Cocunubo	Canada	54.25	
42	6	6	Chou Wei-Liang	Chinese Taipei	54.26	
43	6	8	Tsai Yi-lin	Chinese Taipei	54.28	
44	5	6	Teimuraz Kobakhidze	Georgia	54.34	
45	7	6	Ryan Pini	Papua New Guinea	54.37	
46	6	7	Navaphat Wongcharoen	Thailand	54.50	
47	5	7	Bryan Alvarez	Costa Rica	54.77	NR
48	5	4	Jordy Groters	Aruba	54.87	NR
49	6	3	Khader Baqlah	Jordan	54.99	NR
50	7	1	Dylan Koo	Singapore	55.23	
51	6	0	Anthony Barbar	Lebanon	55.58	
52	5	8	Ivo Kunzle Savastano	Paraguay	55.59	
53	4	8	Akaki Vashakidze	Georgia	55.77	
54	6	9	Jean Monteagudo	Peru	55.90	
55	3	7	Jarod Arroyo	Puerto Rico	56.01	
56	5	1	Keanan Dols	Jamaica	56.05	
57	4	3	Ljupcho Angelovski	Macedonia	56.11	
58	4	4	Ivan Soruco	Bolivia	56.16	
59	4	5	A Al-Doori	Iraq	56.43	NR
60	4	7	Jeremy Lim	Philippines	56.49	
61	5	5	Amir Amrollahi Biuoki	Iran	56.52	
62	5	9	Noah Al-Khulaifi	Qatar	56.77	NR
63	1	4	Adrian Hoek	Curaçao	56.82	NR
64	4	1	Jim Sanderson	Gibraltar	56.92	NR
65	3	3	Miguel Mena	Nicaragua	57.06	NR
66	5	0	Joaquin Sepulveda Parra	Chile	57.10	
67	4	2	Jhonny Perez	Dominican Republic	57.34	
68	3	5	George Jabbour	Honduras	57.37	
69	3	1	Issa Mohamed	Kenya	57.41	
70	2	5	Dioser Nunez	Dominican Republic	57.46	
71	4	0	Hannibal Gaskin	Guyana	57.62	
72	4	6	Jeancarlo Calderon Harper	Panama	57.96	
73	1	5	Sebastien Kouma	Mali	58.03	
74	3	4	João Matias	Angola	58.13	
75	3	6	Sio Ka Kun	Macau	58.14	NR
76	2	3	Matthew Ives	Botswana	58.24	NR
77	2	4	Matt Dylan Savitz	Gibraltar	58.40	NR
78	3	2	Nuno Rola	Angola	58.59	
79	3	8	Livingston Aika	Papua New Guinea	59.53	
80	3	0	Ridhwan Mohamed	Kenya	59.57	
81	2	2	Carlos Vasquez	Honduras	59.98	
82	2	6	Ibrahim Nishwan	Maldives	1:00.71	
83	2	7	Tanner Poppe	Guam	1:04.01	NR
84	2	9	Ismail Adnan	Maldives	1:05.97	NR
85	2	8	Christian Villacrusis	Northern Mariana Islands	1:08.02	NR
86	2	1	Salofi Welch	Northern Mariana Islands	1:09.66	
87	2	0	Joseph Sumari	Tanzania	1:16.25	NR
	7	7	Adam Allouche	Lebanon		DSQ
	3	9	Hasan Sadeq	Iraq		DNS
	4	9	Paul Elaisa	Fiji		DNS
	6	4	Ayman Kelzi	Syria		DNS
	7	3	Jonathan Gómez	Colombia		DNS
	8	0	Artyom Kozlyuk	Uzbekistan		DNS

=== Semifinals ===
The semifinals were held at 19:51.

==== Semifinal 1 ====
Rank	Lane	Name	Nationality	Time	Notes
1	5	David Morgan	Australia	50.06	Q
2	3	Jérémy Stravius	France	50.38	Q, NR
3	6	Takeshi Kawamoto	Japan	50.54	Q
4	2	Pavel Sankovich	Belarus	50.76	
5	4	Matthew Josa	United States	50.78	
6	1	Marius Kusch	Germany	50.97	
7	8	Yauhen Tsurkin	Belarus	51.00	
8	7	Li Zhuhao	China	51.37	

==== Semifinal 2 ====
Rank	Lane	Name	Nationality	Time	Notes
1	3	Adam Barrett	Great Britain	49.21	Q, NR
2	4	Tom Shields	United States	49.46	Q
3	5	Chad le Clos	South Africa	49.84	Q
4	8	Tommaso D'Orsogna	Australia	50.39	Q
5	7	Mehdy Metella	France	50.46	Q
6	2	Aleksandr Kharlanov	Russia	50.63	
7	6	Daniil Pakhomov	Russia	50.97	
8	1	Mark Szaranek	Great Britain	51.48	

=== Final ===
The final was held at 19:30.

Rank	Lane	Name	Nationality	Time	Notes
1st place, gold medalist(s)	3	Chad le Clos	South Africa	48.08	WR
2nd place, silver medalist(s)	5	Tom Shields	United States	49.04	
3rd place, bronze medalist(s)	6	David Morgan	Australia	49.31	OC
4	4	Adam Barrett	Great Britain	49.47	
5	1	Mehdy Metella	France	50.16	
6	8	Takeshi Kawamoto	Japan	50.37	
7	2	Jérémy Stravius	France	50.53	
8	7	Tommaso D'Orsogna	Australia	50.77	
