= List of Curaçaoan records in swimming =

The Curaçaoan records in swimming are the fastest ever performances of swimmers from Curaçao, which are recognised and ratified by the Curaçao Aquatics Association.

== Long course (50 m) ==
=== Men ===
Event	Time		Name	Club	Date	Meet	Location	Ref
50 m freestyle	23.33		Perry Lindo	Curaçao	10 April 2016	Swim Cup Eindhoven 2016	Eindhoven, Netherlands	
100 m freestyle	50.73		Hilton Woods	AHO	18 September 1988	Olympic Games	Seoul, South Korea	
100 m freestyle	52.01	h	Mauricio Payne	Curaçao	25 July 2018	Central American and Caribbean Games	Barranquilla, Colombia	
200 m freestyle	1:56.33		Vincent van Rutten	AHO	15 April 2004	NK	Amsterdam, Netherlands	
200 m freestyle	1:58.77	h	Serginni Marten	Curaçao	30 June 2016	CISC	Nassau, Bahamas	
400 m freestyle	4:08.66		Evert Kroon	AHO	13 April 1984	Curacaose Kampioenschappen	Willemstad, Curaçao	
400 m freestyle	4:18.46		Raim Michiel	Curaçao	2 July 2016	CISC	Nassau, Bahamas	
800 m freestyle	8:52.69		Derrick Bakhuis	AHO	23 April 2011	XXVI Carifta Swimming Championships	Widley, Barbados	
800 m freestyle	9:52.62		Jursil Chirino	Curaçao	16 November 2013	Wedstrijden Open	Willemstad, Curaçao	
1500 m freestyle	16:45.75		Derrick Bakhuis	AHO	28 June 2010	CISC	Havana, Cuba	
1500 m freestyle	17:02.33		Raim Michiel	Curaçao	29 June 2016	CISC	Nassau, Bahamas	
50 m backstroke	28.23		Jeremy Kostons	Curaçao	4 July 2014	CISC	Christ Church, Barbados	
100 m backstroke	1:01.61		Hilton Woods	AHO	28 July 1985	CCCAN XIV	Oaxtepec, Mexico	
100 m backstroke	1:01.72	r	Jeremy Kostons	Curaçao	4 July 2014	CISC	Bridgetown, Barbados	
200 m backstroke	2:13.84		Henk van Niejenhuis	AHO	29 April 2004	Dutch Caribbean Invitational V	Willemstad, Curaçao	
200m backstroke	2:17.13	h	Carolus Josefina	Curaçao	2 July 2016	CISC	Nassau, Bahamas	
50m breaststroke	28.61	h	Rodion Davelaar	AHO	18 July 2010	CAC 2010	Mayagüez, Puerto Rico	
50m breaststroke	29.14		Serginni Marten	Curaçao	20 April 2019	AIYSC International Youth Swimming Cup	Antwerpen, Belgium	
100m breaststroke	1:04.43	h	Joydon Loran	Curaçao	19 December 2025	National Meeting Occitanie - Nîmes	Nimes, France	
200m breaststroke	2:25.52		Camillo Berenos	AHO	26 April 1996	International Invitational		
200m breaststroke	2:23.69		Serginni Marten	Curaçao	30 June 2018	CCCAN	Savaneta, Aruba	
50m butterfly	25.02	h	Mauricio Payne	Curaçao	22 July 2018	CAC Games	Barranquilla, Colombia	
100m butterfly	55.59	b	Seggio Bernardina	Curaçao	24 July 2018	CAC Games	Barranquilla, Colombia	
200m butterfly	2:11.32		Karel Gustaaf Smit	AHO	19 May 1996	-	United States	
200m butterfly	2:18.50		Seggio Bernardina	Curaçao	4 July 2014	CISC	Bridgetown, Barbados	
200m individual medley	2:12.86		Vincent van Rutten	AHO	18 April 2004	NK	Amsterdam, Netherlands	
200m individual medley	2:17.48	h	Carolus Josefina	Curaçao	1 July 2016	CISC	Nassau, Bahamas	
400m individual medley	4:38.80		Vincent van Rutten	AHO	15 April 2004	NK	Amsterdam, Netherlands	
4×100 m freestyle relay								
4×200m freestyle relay	8:14.91		Raim Michiel (2:03.49); Carolus Josefina (2:02.49); Jordano de Castro (2:06.39); Seggio Bernardina (2:02.54)	Curaçao	1 July 2016	CISC	Nassau, Bahamas	
4×100m medley relay	4:00.31		Carolus Josefina (1:01.22); Rainier Rafaela (1:09.69); Seggio Bernardina (57.08); Serginni Marten (52.32)	Curaçao	3 July 2018	CCCAN	Savaneta, Aruba	

Legend: # – Record awaiting ratification by Curaçao Aquatics Association; WR – World record; AM – Americas record; e – equalled existing record;
Records not set in finals: h – heat; sf – semifinal; r – relay 1st leg; rh – relay heat 1st leg; b – B final; † – en route to final mark; so – swim-off; tt – time trial

=== Women ===
Event	Time		Name	Club	Date	Meet	Location	Ref
50m freestyle	26.45		Chade Nersicio	Curaçao	2 July 2017	CCCAN	Couva, Trinidad and Tobago	
100m freestyle	57.67		Chade Nersicio	Curaçao	30 June 2017	CCCAN	Couva, Trinidad and Tobago	
200m freestyle	2:10.98		Tessa Solomon	AHO	29 March 1996	Dual Meet, MAH	Willemstad, Curaçao	
200m freestyle	2:15.24	h	Chade Nersicio	Curaçao	29 June 2017	CCCAN	Couva, Trinidad and Tobago	
400m freestyle	4:37.87		Tessa Solomon	AHO	29 March 1996	Dual Meet, MAH	Willemstad, Curaçao	
400m freestyle	5:17.17		José Adema	-	7 March 2014	Wedstrijden Open		
800m freestyle	9:30.40		Samantha van Vuure	Curaçao	20 April 2019	CARIFTA Championships	Bridgetown, Barbados	
1500m freestyle	18:57.27	h	Bo-Anne Bos	Typhoon	3 August 2015	World Championships	Kazan, Russia	
50m backstroke	30.62	h	Chade Nersicio	Curaçao	20 April 2019	CARIFTA Championships	Bridgetown, Barbados	
100m backstroke	1:06.54		Tessa Solomon	AHO	30 April 1998	Bulado International Invitational	Willemstad, Curaçao	
100m backstroke	1:16.62		Islelie Silvanie	-	4 October 2013	Bulado Meet		
200m backstroke	2:27.69		Tessa Solomon	AHO	8 May 1998	Bulado International Invitational	Willemstad, Curaçao	
200m backstroke	2:31.63		Samantha van Vuure	Curaçao	23 April 2019	CARIFTA Championships	Bridgetown, Barbados	
50m breaststroke	34.14		Chade Nersicio	Curaçao	1 July 2016	CISC	Nassau, Bahamas	
100m breaststroke	1:14.27		Chade Nersicio	Curaçao	2 July 2017	CCCAN	Couva, Trinidad and Tobago	
200m breaststroke	2:43.90		Chade Nersicio	Curaçao	29 June 2016	CISC	Nassau, Bahamas	
50m butterfly	27.59		Chade Nersicio	Curaçao	29 June 2017	CCCAN	Port of Spain, Trinidad and Tobago	
100m butterfly	1:02.27		Chade Nersicio	Curaçao	28 June 2017	CCCAN	Port of Spain, Trinidad and Tobago	
200m butterfly	2:29.13		Ida Smit	AHO	1 August 1988	CCCAN, Senior	Oax, Mexico	
200m individual medley	2:27.28		Chade Nersicio	-		-		
400m individual medley	5:29.34		Tessa Solomon	AHO	10 May 1996	A Championships	Willemstad, Curaçao	
400m individual medley	5:29.56		Samantha van Vuure	Curaçao	21 April 2019	CARIFTA Championships	Bridgetown, Barbados	
4×100m freestyle relay								
4×200m freestyle relay								
4×100m medley relay								

Legend: # – Record awaiting ratification by Curaçao Aquatics Association; WR – World record; AM – Americas record; e – equalled existing record;
Records not set in finals: h – heat; sf – semifinal; r – relay 1st leg; rh – relay heat 1st leg; b – B final; † – en route to final mark; so – swim-off; tt – time trial

== Short course (25m) ==
=== Men ===
Event	Time		Name	Club	Date	Meet	Location	Ref
50m freestyle	22.85	h	Serginni Marten	Curaçao	27 October 2018	49th International Swimming Festival	Aachen, Germany	
100m freestyle	49.89	h	Serginni Marten	Curaçao	21 December 2019	Dutch Open Championships	Tilburg, Netherlands	
200m freestyle	1:51.58	r	Serginni Marten	Curaçao	21 December 2019	Dutch Open Championships	Tilburg, Netherlands	
400m freestyle	4:01.12	h	Mark Burnley	Curaçao	5 December 2014	World Championships	Doha, Qatar	
800m freestyle	8:34.57	†	Mark Burnley	Curaçao	7 December 2014	World Championships	Doha, Qatar	
1500m freestyle	16:21.88		Mark Burnley	Curaçao	7 December 2014	World Championships	Doha, Qatar	
50m backstroke	27.42	rh	Adrian Hoek	Curaçao	8 December 2016	World Championships	Windsor, Canada	
100m backstroke	1:00.10	h	Jeremy Kostons	Curaçao	3 December 2014	World Championships	Doha, Qatar	
200m backstroke								
50m breaststroke	27.79	h	Serginni Marten	Curaçao	21 December 2018	Dutch Open Championships	Tilburg, Netherlands	
100m breaststroke	1:01.29		Serginni Marten	Curaçao	23 December 2018	Dutch Open Championships	Tilburg, Netherlands	
200m breaststroke	2:15.98	h	Serginni Marten	Curaçao	22 December 2019	Dutch Open Championships	Tilburg, Netherlands	
50m butterfly	24.76	h, †	Seggio Bernardina	Curaçao	12 December 2018	World Championships	Hangzhou, China	
100m butterfly	54.25	h	Seggio Bernardina	Curaçao	12 December 2018	World Championships	Hangzhou, China	
200m butterfly								
100m individual medley	58.25	h	Adrian Hoek	Curaçao	8 December 2016	World Championships	Windsor, Canada	
200m individual medley								
400m individual medley								

Legend: # – Record awaiting ratification by Curaçao Aquatics Association; WR – World record; AM – Americas record; e – equalled existing record;
Records not set in finals: h – heat; sf – semifinal; r – relay 1st leg; rh – relay heat 1st leg; b – B final; † – en route to final mark; so – swim-off; tt – time trial

=== Women ===
Event	Time		Name	Club	Date	Meet	Location	Ref
50m freestyle	25.90	h	Chade Nersicio	Curaçao	11 December 2016	World Championships	Windsor, Canada	
100m freestyle	58.86	h	Chade Nersicio	Curaçao	7 December 2016	World Championships	Windsor, Canada	
200m freestyle								
400m freestyle								
800m freestyle								
1500m freestyle								
50m backstroke	32.57	h	Tiareth Cijntje	Curaçao	9 December 2016	World Championships	Windsor, Canada	
100m backstroke	1:08.50	h	Tiareth Cijntje	Curaçao	6 December 2016	World Championships	Windsor, Canada	
200m backstroke	2:31.46	h	Tiareth Cijntje	Curaçao	8 December 2016	World Championships	Windsor, Canada	
50m breaststroke	33.51	h	Chade Nersicio	Curaçao	6 December 2016	World Championships	Windsor, Canada	
100m breaststroke	1:13.56	h	Chade Nersicio	Curaçao	9 December 2016	World Championships	Windsor, Canada	
200m breaststroke	2:44.74	h	Chade Nersicio	Curaçao	11 December 2016	World Championships	Windsor, Canada	
50m butterfly	28.16	h	Chade Nersicio	Curaçao	8 December 2016	World Championships	Windsor, Canada	
100m butterfly								
200m butterfly								
100m individual medley	1:05.77	h	Chade Nersicio	Curaçao	8 December 2016	World Championships	Windsor, Canada	
200m individual medley								
400m individual medley								

Legend: # – Record awaiting ratification by Curaçao Aquatics Association; WR – World record; AM – Americas record; e – equalled existing record;
Records not set in finals: h – heat; sf – semifinal; r – relay 1st leg; rh – relay heat 1st leg; b – B final; † – en route to final mark; so – swim-off; tt – time trial

=== Mixed relay ===
Event	Time		Name	Club	Date	Meet	Location	Ref
4×50 m freestyle relay	1:43.08	h	Adrian Hoek (23.58); Chade Nersicio (26.37); Tiareth Cijntje (28.13); Rainier Rafaela (25.00)	Curaçao	7 December 2016	World Championships	Windsor, Canada	
4×50 m medley relay	1:53.99	h	Adrian Hoek (27.42); Rainier Rafaela (29.51); Chade Nersicio (29.07); Tiareth Cijntje (27.99)	Curaçao	8 December 2016	World Championships	Windsor, Canada	

Legend: # – Record awaiting ratification by Curaçao Aquatics Association; WR – World record; AM – Americas record; e – equalled existing record;
Records not set in finals: h – heat; so – swim-off
