= 2016 FINA World Swimming Championships (25 m) – Men's 100 metre backstroke =

Men's 100 metre backstroke at the 2016 FINA World Swimming Championships (25 m)
- Venue: WFCU Centre
- Dates: 6 December (heats and semifinals); 7 December (final)
- Competitors: 73 from 55 nations
- Winning time: 49.65

Medalists
gold medal	Mitch Larkin	Australia
silver medal	Andrey Shabasov	Russia
bronze medal	Xu Jiayu	China

The Men's 100 metre backstroke competition of the 2016 FINA World Swimming Championships (25 m) was held on 6 and 7 December 2016.

== Records ==
Prior to the competition, the existing world and championship records were as follows.

	Name	Nation	Time	Location	Date
World record	Matt Grevers	United States	48.92	Indianapolis	12 December 2015
Championship record	Stanislav Donets	Russia	48.95	Dubai	19 December 2010

== Results ==
=== Heats ===
The heats were held at 11:28.

Rank	Heat	Lane	Name	Nationality	Time	Notes
1	8	5	Xu Jiayu	China	50.21	Q
2	8	3	Mitch Larkin	Australia	50.22	Q
3	8	4	Radosław Kawęcki	Poland	50.63	Q
4	6	7	Jacob Pebley	United States	50.64	Q
5	7	3	Junya Koga	Japan	50.71	Q
5	7	4	Andrey Shabasov	Russia	50.71	Q
7	8	9	Grigoriy Tarasevich	Russia	50.93	Q
8	7	5	Masaki Kaneko	Japan	51.01	Q
9	8	6	Robert Glință	Romania	51.03	Q
10	6	4	Pavel Sankovich	Belarus	51.07	Q
11	6	3	Tomasz Polewka	Poland	51.11	Q
12	6	5	Bobby Hurley	Australia	51.13	Q
13	7	7	Javier Acevedo	Canada	51.32	Q
14	6	2	Miguel Ortiz-Cañavate	Spain	51.50	Q
15	6	6	Danas Rapšys	Lithuania	51.61	Q
15	7	6	David Gamburg	Israel	51.61	Q
17	8	7	Thomas Avetand	France	51.80	
18	4	3	Anton Loncar	Croatia	51.86	
19	6	8	Ádám Telegdy	Hungary	52.02	
20	7	9	Apostolos Christou	Greece	52.07	NR
21	8	0	Gabriel Lopes	Portugal	52.21	
22	8	8	Tomáš Franta	Czech Republic	52.24	
23	6	1	Oleg Garasymovytch	France	52.36	
24	5	1	Lê Nguyễn Paul	Vietnam	52.57	NR
25	7	8	Charlie Boldison	Great Britain	52.61	
26	7	1	Viktar Staselovich	Belarus	52.62	
27	5	6	Charles Hockin	Paraguay	52.80	NR
28	5	3	Markus Thormeyer	Canada	53.15	
29	7	2	Iskender Baslakov	Turkey	53.19	
30	6	9	Mattias Carlsson	Sweden	53.34	
31	5	2	Ricky Ellis	South Africa	53.37	
31	7	0	Ryan Pini	Papua New Guinea	53.37	
33	5	8	Trần Duy Khôi	Vietnam	53.64	
34	5	5	Gaston Hernandez	Argentina	53.71	
35	8	1	Magnus Jakupsson	Denmark	53.89	
36	5	7	Christopher Courtis	Barbados	53.94	NR
37	5	0	David Adalsteinsson	Iceland	54.12	
38	5	4	Kristinn Þórarinsson	Iceland	54.43	
39	5	9	Kristóf Rasovszky	Hungary	54.52	
40	4	5	Francis Fong	Singapore	54.89	
41	1	1	Boris Kirillov	Azerbaijan	54.90	NR
42	4	6	Jarryd Baxter	South Africa	55.18	
43	4	9	Keanan Dols	Jamaica	55.39	NR
44	4	7	Yeziel Morales Miranda	Puerto Rico	55.68	
45	3	7	Adel Elfakir	Libya	55.83	NR
46	4	8	Gorazd Chepishevski	Macedonia	55.98	NR
47	3	0	Syed Hasseb Tariq	Pakistan	56.79	NR
48	3	4	Adil Assouab	Morocco	56.82	
49	3	6	Jarod Alexander Arroyo	Puerto Rico	57.32	
50	2	5	Jordan Gonzalez	Gibraltar	57.65	NR
51	3	8	Hernan Gonzalez Medina	Panama	57.68	NR
52	4	2	Ivo Kunzle Savastano	Paraguay	57.78	
53	4	0	Eisner Barberena Espinoza	Nicaragua	57.89	NR
54	1	8	Sebastien Kouma	Mali	58.03	NR
55	2	4	Steven Kimani Maina	Kenya	58.18	
56	3	1	Alex McCallum	Cayman Islands	58.38	
57	3	5	Abdullah Al-Doori	Iraq	58.63	NR
58	2	3	William Clark	Fiji	58.77	NR
59	3	3	Yum Cheng Man	Macau	59.71	
60	3	2	Heriniavo Michael Rasolonjatovo	Madagascar	1:00.05	NR
61	1	7	Mohammad Juwel Ahmed	Bangladesh	1:00.98	NR
62	2	6	Kennet Libohova	Albania	1:01.96	
63	2	2	Livingston Aika	Papua New Guinea	1:02.55	
64	2	1	Daryl Appleton	Antigua and Barbuda	1:02.96	NR
65	2	8	Elijah James Cruz	Gibraltar	1:03.90	
66	2	0	Temaruata Strickland	Cook Islands	1:04.57	NR
67	1	4	Tongli Panuve	Tonga	1:05.86	NR
68	3	9	Naveed Hussian	Pakistan	1:07.01	
69	2	9	Cruz Halbich	Saint Vincent and the Grenadines	1:07.78	NR
70	1	5	Aaron de Freitas	Saint Vincent and the Grenadines	1:13.93	
71	1	2	Joseph Richard Sumari	Tanzania	1:14.93	
72	1	6	Dennis Hamis Mhini	Tanzania	1:17.30	
	6	0	Michael Taylor	United States		DSQ
	1	3	Tanner Poppe	Guam		DNS
	2	7	Hasan Isam Sadeq	Iraq		DNS
	4	1	Driss Lachrichi	Morocco		DNS
	4	4	Daniil Bukin	Uzbekistan		DNS
	8	2	Dylan Carter	Trinidad and Tobago		DNS

=== Semifinals ===
The semifinals were held at 18:46.

==== Semifinal 1 ====
Rank	Lane	Name	Nationality	Time	Notes
1	3	Andrey Shabasov	Russia	49.71	Q
2	4	Mitch Larkin	Australia	50.10	Q
3	5	Jacob Pebley	United States	50.56	Q
4	6	Masaki Kaneko	Japan	50.65	
5	2	Pavel Sankovich	Belarus	50.83	
6	7	Bobby Hurley	Australia	50.87	
7	1	Miguel Ortiz-Cañavate	Spain	51.43	
8	8	David Gamburg	Israel	51.76	

==== Semifinal 2 ====
Rank	Lane	Name	Nationality	Time	Notes
1	4	Xu Jiayu	China	49.99	Q, AS
2	5	Radosław Kawęcki	Poland	50.17	Q
3	2	Robert Glință	Romania	50.37	Q, NR
4	6	Grigoriy Tarasevich	Russia	50.54	Q
5	3	Junya Koga	Japan	50.59	Q
6	8	Danas Rapšys	Lithuania	51.10	
7	1	Javier Acevedo	Canada	51.16	
8	7	Tomasz Polewka	Poland	51.37	

=== Final ===
The final was held at 18:37.

Rank	Lane	Name	Nationality	Time	Notes
1st place, gold medalist(s)	3	Mitch Larkin	Australia	49.65	
2nd place, silver medalist(s)	4	Andrey Shabasov	Russia	49.69	
3rd place, bronze medalist(s)	5	Xu Jiayu	China	50.02	
4	8	Junya Koga	Japan	50.21	
5	6	Radosław Kawęcki	Poland	50.22	
6	1	Jacob Pebley	United States	50.24	
7	2	Robert Glință	Romania	50.52	
8	7	Grigoriy Tarasevich	Russia	50.95	
