= List of Iraqi records in swimming =

The Iraqi records in swimming are the fastest ever performances of swimmers from Iraq, which are recognised and ratified by the Iraqi Swimming Federation.

All records were set in finals unless noted otherwise.

== Long Course (50 m) ==
=== Men ===
Event	Time		Name	Club	Date	Meet	Location	Ref
50 m freestyle	24.49	h	Bakr Al-Dulaimi	Iraq	28 July 2017	World Championships	Budapest, Hungary	
100 m freestyle	53.12	h	Bakr Al-Dulaimi	Iraq	26 July 2017	World Championships	Budapest, Hungary	
200 m freestyle	1:56.23		Bakr Al-Dulaimi	Iraq	6 April 2016	3rd Arab Championships	Dubai, United Arab Emirates	
400 m freestyle	4:09.49		Bakr Al-Dulaimi	Iraq	5 April 2016	3rd Arab Championships	Dubai, United Arab Emirates	
800 m freestyle								
1500 m freestyle	16:34.65		Bakr Al-Dulaimi	Iraq	1 April 2015	12th Arab Age Group Championships	Dubai, United Arab Emirates	
50 m backstroke	27.91		Mohammed Isam Sadeq	-	7 May 2024	Iraqi Championships	Baghdad, Iraq	
100 m backstroke	1:01.10		Mohammed Isam Sadeq	-	7 May 2024	Iraqi Championships	Baghdad, Iraq	
200 m backstroke	2:16.50		Omer Sahib Kadhim	-	6 May 2024	Iraqi Championships	Baghdad, Iraq	
50m breaststroke	30.16	h	Mohammed Al-Khalidi	Iraq	29 July 2025	World Championships	Singapore, Singapore	
100m breaststroke	1:05.87	h	Mohammed Al-Khalidi	Iraq	27 July 2025	World Championships	Singapore, Singapore	
200m breaststroke	2:26.70		Mohammed Al-Khalidi	Iraq	31 August 2025	Arab Championships	Casablanca, Morocco	
50m butterfly	25.44		Mohammed Isam Sadeq	-	7 May 2024	Iraqi Championships	Baghdad, Iraq	
100m butterfly	57.66		Hashem Ahmed	-	6 May 2024	Iraqi Championships	Baghdad, Iraq	
200m butterfly	2:10.30		Hashem Ahmed	-	7 May 2024	Iraqi Championships	Baghdad, Iraq	
200m individual medley	2:16.97		Ahmed Al-Mutairy	Iraq	8 September 2017	Asian Age Group Championships	Tashkent, Uzbekistan	
400m individual medley	4:47.63		Bakr Al-Dulaimi	Iraq	3 April 2015	12th Arab Age Group Championships	Dubai, United Arab Emirates	
4×100m freestyle relay								
4×200m freestyle relay								
4×100m medley relay								

Legend: # – Record awaiting ratification by Iraqi Swimming Federation; WR – World record; AS – Asian record;
Records not set in finals: h – heat; sf – semifinal; r – relay 1st leg; rh – relay heat 1st leg; b – B final; † – en route to final mark; so – swim-off; tt – time trial

=== Women ===
Event	Time		Name	Club	Date	Meet	Location	Ref
50 m freestyle								
100 m freestyle								
200 m freestyle								
400 m freestyle								
800 m freestyle								
1500 m freestyle								
50 m backstroke								
100 m backstroke								
200 m backstroke								
50 m breaststroke	35.79	h, †	Honia Ibrahim	Iraq	24 July 2017	World Championships	Budapest, Hungary	
100 m breaststroke	1:17.48	h	Honia Ibrahim	Iraq	24 July 2017	World Championships	Budapest, Hungary	
200 m breaststroke	2:45.37	h	Honia Ibrahim	Iraq	27 July 2017	World Championships	Budapest, Hungary	
50 m butterfly								
100 m butterfly								
200 m butterfly								
200 m individual medley								
400 m individual medley								
4×100 m freestyle relay								
4×200 m freestyle relay								
4×100 m medley relay								

Legend: # – Record awaiting ratification by Iraqi Swimming Federation; WR – World record; AS – Asian record;
Records not set in finals: h – heat; sf – semifinal; r – relay 1st leg; rh – relay heat 1st leg; b – B final; † – en route to final mark; so – swim-off; tt – time trial

== Short Course (25 m) ==
=== Men ===
Event	Time		Name	Club	Date	Meet	Location	Ref
50 m freestyle	23.59	h	Bakr Al-Dulaimi	Iraq	13 December 2018	World Championships	Hangzhou, China	
100 m freestyle	51.73	h	Bakr Al-Dulaimi	Iraq	15 December 2018	World Championships	Hangzhou, China	
200 m freestyle	1:53.60	h	Hashim Haba	University of Ottawa	12 March 2026	U SPORTS Championships	Markham, Canada	
400 m freestyle	4:18.40	h	Bakr Salam Ali	Iraq	14 December 2012	World Championships	Istanbul, Turkey	
800 m freestyle								
1500 m freestyle								
50m backstroke	28.62	h, †	A. Al-Doori	Iraq	6 December 2016	World Championships	Windsor, Canada	
50m backstroke	27.63	#	Mohammed Isam Sadeq	Iraq	24 October 2021	Arab Championships	Abu Dhabi, United Arab Emirates	
100m backstroke	58.63	h	Abdullah Al-Doori	Iraq	6 December 2016	World Championships	Windsor, Canada	
200m backstroke								
50m breaststroke	31.58	h, †	Ahmed Al-Hassani	Iraq	16 December 2021	World Championships	Abu Dhabi, United Arab Emirates	
100 m breaststroke	1:06.77	h	Ahmed Al-Hassani	Iraq	14 December 2022	World Championships	Melbourne, Australia	
200 m breaststroke								
50m butterfly	25.56	h	Hashim Haba	University of Ottawa	13 March 2026	U SPORTS Championships	Markham, Canada	
100m butterfly	56.43	h	A. Al-Doori	Iraq	7 December 2016	World Championships	Windsor, Canada	
100m butterfly	54.98	#	Mohammed Isam Sadeq	Iraq	24 October 2021	Arab Championships	Abu Dhabi, United Arab Emirates	
200 m butterfly	2:01.91	h	Hashim Haba	Iraq	12 December 2024	World Championships	Budapest, Hungary	
100 m individual medley								
200m individual medley	2:11.05	h	Ahmed Al-Mutairy	Iraq	16 December 2021	World Championships	Abu Dhabi, United Arab Emirates	
400 m individual medley	4:47.01		Bakr Al-Dulaimi	Iraq	25 October 2021	Arab Championships	Abu Dhabi, United Arab Emirates	
4×50 m freestyle relay								
4×100 m freestyle relay								
4×200 m freestyle relay								
4×50 m medley relay								
4×100 m medley relay								

Legend: # – Record awaiting ratification by Iraqi Swimming Federation; WR – World record; AS – Asian record;
Records not set in finals: h – heat; sf – semifinal; r – relay 1st leg; rh – relay heat 1st leg; b – B final; † – en route to final mark; so – swim-off; tt – time trial

=== Women ===
Event	Time	Name	Club	Date	Meet	Location	Ref
50 m freestyle							
100 m freestyle							
200 m freestyle							
400 m freestyle							
800 m freestyle							
1500 m freestyle							
50 m backstroke							
100 m backstroke							
200 m backstroke							
50 m breaststroke							
100 m breaststroke							
200 m breaststroke							
50 m butterfly							
100 m butterfly							
200 m butterfly							
100 m individual medley							
200 m individual medley							
400 m individual medley							
4×50 m freestyle relay							
4×100 m freestyle relay							
4×200 m freestyle relay							
4×50 m medley relay							
4×100 m medley relay							

Legend: # – Record awaiting ratification by Iraqi Swimming Federation; WR – World record; AS – Asian record;
Records not set in finals: h – heat; sf – semifinal; r – relay 1st leg; rh – relay heat 1st leg; b – B final; † – en route to final mark; so – swim-off; tt – time trial
