= CARIFTA Swimming Championships =

Annual Caribbean championships

The CARIFTA Aquatics Championships is an annual, age-group aquatics championships for the Caribbean. It has been held since 1985, and is similar in form/origin to the track & field/athletics event: the CARIFTA Games. The event is held under the auspices of CANOC, the Caribbean Association of National Olympic Committees.

The 39th edition of the championships was held in 2026 in Fort-de-France, Martinique.

== Editions ==
Year	Edition	Location	Dates	Top Team	Results
1991	XVI	Fort-de-France, Martinique	April	Bahamas	
1992	XVI	Road Town, British Virgin Islands	April	Martinique	
1993	XVI	Port-au-Prince, Haiti	April	Martinique	
1994	XVI	Cayenne, French Guiana	April	Martinique	
1995	XVI	Guatemala City, Guatemala	April	Guyana	
1996	XVI	Vieux Fort, Saint Lucia	April	Cayman Islands	
1997	XVI	St George's, Grenada	April	Martinique	
1998	XVI	(France) Basse-Terre, Guadeloupe	April 16–18	Trinidad and Tobago	
1999	XIV	Kingston, Jamaica	April 3–5	Jamaica	
2000	XV	Curaçao, Netherlands Antilles	March	Jamaica	
2001	XVI	(The Bahamas) Nassau, Bahamas	April	Jamaica	
2002	XVII	Bridgetown, Barbados	April 11–15	Jamaica	
2003	XVIII	Kingston, Jamaica	April 19–21	Jamaica	
2004	XIX	(The Bahamas) Nassau, Bahamas	April 15–18	Jamaica	
2005	XX	Curaçao, Netherlands Antilles	March 31 – April 3	(Netherlands Antilles) French Antilles	
2006	XXI	Wildey, Barbados	April 6–9	(Netherlands Antilles) French Antilles	
2007	XXII	Kingston, Jamaica	April 6-11	Bahamas	
2008	XXIII	Savaneta, Aruba	March 26–31	(Netherlands Antilles) French Antilles	
2009	XXIV	Savaneta, Aruba	April 15–20	Trinidad and Tobago	
2010	XXV	Kingston, Jamaica	April 3–6	Trinidad and Tobago	
2011	XXVI	Wildey, Barbados	April 23 – May 1	Guadeloupe	
2012	XXVII	(The Bahamas) Nassau, Bahamas	April 12–15	Guadeloupe	
2013	XXVIII	Kingston, Jamaica	March 29 – April 3	Guadeloupe	
2014	XXIX	Savaneta, Aruba	April 22–25	Bahamas	
2015	XXX	Bridgetown, Barbados	March 27 – April 8	Bahamas	
2016	XXXI	Fort-de-France, Martinique	March 22–25	Martinique	
2017	XXXII	(The Bahamas) Nassau, Bahamas	April 15–18	Bahamas	
2018	XXXIII	Kingston, Jamaica	March 31 – April 3	Bahamas	
2019	XXXIV	Bridgetown, Barbados	April 20–23	Bahamas	
2020	cancelled	Bridgetown, Barbados	April 11–14		
2021	cancelled	Bridgetown, Barbados	April 3–6		
2022	XXXV	Bridgetown, Barbados	April 16–19	Bahamas	
2023	XXXVI	(Curaçao) Willemstad, Curacao	April 6–9	Bahamas	
2024	XXXVII	(The Bahamas) Nassau, Bahamas	March 30 – April 4	Bahamas	
2025	XXXVIII	Couva, Trinidad and Tobago	April 19–22	Bahamas	
2026	XXXIX	Fort-de-France, Martinique	April 4–7	Bahamas	

== CARIFTA Swimming Championships records ==
All records were set in finals unless noted otherwise. All times are swum in a long-course (50m) pool.

=== Boys (11–12) ===
Event	Time	Name	Nationality	Date	Meet	Location	Ref
50 m freestyle	25.78	Christon Joseph	The Bahamas	2 April 2024	2024 Championships	Nassau, Bahamas	
100 m freestyle	56.11	Dylan Carter	Trinidad and Tobago	April 2009	2009 Championships	Savaneta, Aruba	
200 m freestyle	2:04.11	Dylan Carter	Trinidad and Tobago	April 2009	2009 Championships	Savaneta, Aruba	
400 m freestyle	4:27.78	Zarek Wilson	Trinidad and Tobago	3 April 2018	2018 Championships	Kingston, Jamaica	
50 m backstroke	29.80	Yael Touw Ngie Tjouw	Suriname	April 2014	2014 Championships	Savaneta, Aruba	
100 m backstroke	1:05.25	Yael Touw Ngie Tjouw	Suriname	April 2014	2014 Championships	Savaneta, Aruba	
200 m backstroke	2:23.09	Timothy Wynter	Jamaica	April 2009	2009 Championships	Savaneta, Aruba	
50m breaststroke	32.42	Sam Williamson	Bermuda	17 April 2017	2017 Championships	Nassau, Bahamas	
100m breaststroke	1:13.04	Sam Williamson	Bermuda	18 April 2017	2017 Championships	Nassau, Bahamas	
200m breaststroke	2:36.67	Sam Williamson	Bermuda	15 April 2017	2017 Championships	Nassau, Bahamas	
50m butterfly	27.97	Dexter Russell Jr	The Bahamas	April 2025	2025 Championships	Couva, Trinidad and Tobago	
100m butterfly	1:02.40	Yael Touw Ngie Tjouw	Suriname	April 2014	2014 Championships	Savaneta, Aruba	
200m butterfly	2:21.67	Yael Touw Ngie Tjouw	Suriname	April 2014	2014 Championships	Savaneta, Aruba	
200m individual medley	2:20.24	Yael Touw Ngie Tjouw	Suriname	April 2014	2014 Championships	Savaneta, Aruba	
400m individual medley	5:08.18	Nkosi Dunwoody	Barbados	5 April 2015	2015 Championships	Bridgetown, Barbados	
4×50m freestyle relay	1:49.34	Fabri; Francilliette Mauric; Boileau; Miatty	Guadeloupe	April 2012	2012 Championships	Nassau, Bahamas	
4×100m freestyle relay	4:01.92	Boileau; Francilliette Mauric; Fabri; Miatty	Guadeloupe	April 2012	2012 Championships	Nassau, Bahamas	
4×100m medley relay	4:33.43	Morley; Bastian; Gibson; Laing	Bahamas	April 2014	2014 Championships	Savaneta, Aruba	

Legend: # – Record awaiting ratification by CANOC;
Records not set in finals: h – heat; sf – semifinal; r – relay 1st leg; rh – relay heat 1st leg; b – B final; † – en route to final mark; so – swim-off; tt – time trial

=== Girls (11–12) ===
Event	Time	Name	Club	Date	Meet	Location	Ref
50m freestyle	26.59	Elan Daley	Bermuda	3 April 2018	2018 Championships	Kingston, Jamaica	
100m freestyle	1:00.06	Elan Daley	Bermuda	2 April 2018	2018 Championships	Kingston, Jamaica	
200m freestyle	2:10.26	Elan Daley	Bermuda	1 April 2018	2018 Championships	Kingston, Jamaica	
400m freestyle	4:36.93	Heidi Stoute	Barbados	19 April 2022	2022 Championships	Bridgetown, Barbados	
50m backstroke	31.14	Kaija Eastmond	Barbados	19 April 2025	2025 Championships	Couva, Trinidad and Tobago	
100m backstroke	1:08.69	Tyla Martin	Trinidad & Tobago	April 2010	2010 Championships	Kingston, Jamaica	
200m backstroke	2:29.11	Elan Daley	Bermuda	3 April 2018	2018 Championships	Kingston, Jamaica	
50m breaststroke	34.80	Kokolo Foster	Jamaica	April 2019	2019 Championships	Bridgetown, Barbados	
100m breaststroke	1:14.60	Cerian Gibbs	Trinidad & Tobago	1995	1995 Championships		
200m breaststroke	2:47.93	Chade Nersicio	Curacao	April 2014	2014 Championships	Savaneta, Aruba	
50m butterfly	28.87	Elan Daley	Bermuda	1 April 2018	2018 Championships	Kingston, Jamaica	
100m butterfly	1:05.98	Elan Daley	Bermuda	31 March 2018	2018 Championships	Kingston, Jamaica	
200m butterfly	2:30.81	Jodie Foster	Cayman Islands	April 2002	2002 Championships	Bridgetown, Barbados	
200m individual medley	2:27.95	Tyla Martin	Trinidad & Tobago	April 2010	2010 Championships	Kingston, Jamaica	
400m individual medley	5:23.40	Daniella van der Berg	Aruba	April 2009	2009 Championships	Savaneta, Aruba	
4×50m freestyle relay	1:55.47	Safiya Officer; Isabella Sierra; Morgan Cogle; Aliyah Heaven	Jamaica	3 April 2018	2018 Championships	Kingston, Jamaica	
4×100m freestyle relay	4:16.14	E. Daley; J.Bruton; T.White; P.Zelkin	Bermuda	April 2017	2017 Championships	Nassau, Bahamas	
4×100m medley relay	4:49.77	Leanna Wainwright; Kokolo Foster; Giani Francis; Christanya Shirley	Jamaica	21 April 2019	2019 Championships	Bridgetown, Barbados	

Legend: # – Record awaiting ratification by CANOC;
Records not set in finals: h – heat; sf – semifinal; r – relay 1st leg; rh – relay heat 1st leg; b – B final; † – en route to final mark; so – swim-off; tt – time trial

=== Mixed relay (13–14) ===
Event	Time		Name	Nationality	Date	Meet	Location	Ref
4×100m freestyle relay	4:05.25	h		Trinidad and Tobago	2 April 2018	2018 Championships	Kingston, Jamaica	

Legend: # – Record awaiting ratification by CANOC;
Records not set in finals: h – heat; sf – semifinal; r – relay 1st leg; rh – relay heat 1st leg; b – B final; † – en route to final mark; so – swim-off; tt – time trial

=== Boys (13–14) ===
Event	Time	Name	Nationality	Date	Meet	Location	Ref
50m freestyle	24.25	Izaak Bastian	Bahamas	25 March 2016	2016 Championships	Fort-de-France, Martinique	
100m freestyle	53.64	Joshua Romany	Trinidad & Tobago	April 2010	2010 Championships	Kingston, Jamaica	
200m freestyle	1:56.80	Joshua Romany	Trinidad & Tobago	April 2010	2010 Championships	Kingston, Jamaica	
400m freestyle	4:09.46	Allan Huygues-Beaufond	Guadeloupe	April 2009	2009 Championships	Savaneta, Aruba	
800m freestyle	8:48.85	Christophe Maleau	Martinique	18 April 2022	2022 Championships	Bridgetown, Barbados	
1500m freestyle	16:17.72	Allan Huygues-Beaufond	Guadeloupe	April 2009	2009 Championships	Savaneta, Aruba	
50m backstroke	27.67	Davante Carey	Bahamas	15 April 2017	2017 Championships	Nassau, Bahamas	
100m backstroke	59.63	Dylan Carter	Trinidad & Tobago	April/May 2011	2011 Championships	Wildey, Barbados	
200m backstroke	2:11.49	Laurent Geran	Guadeloupe	April 2009	2009 Championships	Savaneta, Aruba	
50m breaststroke	30.41	Izaak Bastian	Bahamas	24 March 2016	2016 Championships	Fort-de-France, Martinique	
100m breaststroke	1:07.76	Izaak Bastian	Bahamas	25 March 2016	2016 Championships	Fort-de-France, Martinique	
200m breaststroke	2:23.78	Izaak Bastian	Bahamas	22 March 2016	2016 Championships	Fort-de-France, Martinique	
50m butterfly	25.66	Cadell Lyons	Trinidad & Tobago	April 2007	2007 Championships	Kingston, Jamaica	
100m butterfly	57.49	Yael Touw Ngie Tjouw	Suriname	22 March 2016	2016 Championships	Fort-de-France, Martinique	
200m butterfly	2:10.18	Shaune Fraser	Cayman Islands	April 2003	2003 Championships	Kingston, Jamaica	
200m individual medley	2:13.56	Mikel Schreuders	Aruba	March/April 2013	2013 Championships	Kingston, Jamaica	
400m individual medley	4:44.89	Shaune Fraser	Cayman Islands	April 2003	2003 Championships	Kingston, Jamaica	
4×50m freestyle relay	1:40.90	Joshua Romany; Dylan Carter; B.Sobrian; K.Boisson-Yates	Trinidad & Tobago	April 2010	2010 Championships	Kingston, Jamaica	
4×100m freestyle relay	3:42.24	K.Boisson-Yates; Dylan Carter; B.Sobrian; Joshua Romany	Trinidad & Tobago	April 2010	2010 Championships	Kingston, Jamaica	
4×200m freestyle relay	8:12.71	D.Bernier; L.Geran; V.Pelagie; A.Huygues-Beaufond	Guadeloupe	April 2009	2009 Championships	Savaneta, Aruba	
4×100m medley relay	4:09.98	Kevon Lockhart (1:04.68); Davante Carey (1:10.28); Ian Pinder (58.51); Lamar Taylor (56.51)	Bahamas	16 April 2017	2017 Championships	Nassau, Bahamas	

Legend: # – Record awaiting ratification by CANOC;
Records not set in finals: h – heat; sf – semifinal; r – relay 1st leg; rh – relay heat 1st leg; b – B final; † – en route to final mark; so – swim-off; tt – time trial

=== Girls (13–14) ===
Event	Time		Name	Club	Date	Meet	Location	Ref
50m freestyle	26.73	h	Emily MacDonald	Jamaica	3 April 2018	2018 Championships	Kingston, Jamaica	
100m freestyle	57.52		Heidi Stoute	Barbados	1 April 2024	2024 Championships	Nassau, Bahamas	
200m freestyle	2:06.13		Elan Daley	Bermuda	21 April 2019	2019 Championships	Bridgetown, Barbados	
400m freestyle	4:28.83		Heidi Stoute	Barbados	2 April 2024	2024 Championships	Nassau, Bahamas	
800m freestyle	9:11.81		Heidi Stoute	Barbados	30 March 2024	2024 Championships	Nassau, Bahamas	
1500m freestyle	18:08.07		Heidi Stoute	Barbados	1 April 2024	2024 Championships	Nassau, Bahamas	
50m backstroke	30.19		Lila Higgo	Cayman Islands	16 April 2022	2022 Championships	Bridgetown, Barbados	
100m backstroke	1:04.69		Lila Higgo	Cayman Islands	17 April 2022	2022 Championships	Bridgetown, Barbados	
200m backstroke	2:23.33		Lila Higgo	Cayman Islands	19 April 2022	2022 Championships	Bridgetown, Barbados	
50m breaststroke	34.29	h	Shne Joachim	Saint Vincent and the Grenadines	6 April 2015	2015 Championships	Bridgetown, Barbados	
100m breaststroke	1:14.35		Lilly Higgs	Bahamas	7 April 2015	2015 Championships	Bridgetown, Barbados	
200m breaststroke	2:38.67		McKayla Lightbourn	Bahamas	April 2007	2007 Championships	Kingston, Jamaica	
50m butterfly	27.78		Naele Portecop	Guadeloupe	1 April 2018	2018 Championships	Kingston, Jamaica	
100m butterfly	1:03.19		Sabrina Lyn	Jamaica	20 April 2019	2019 Championships	Bridgetown, Barbados	
200m butterfly	2:22.26		Heather Roffey	Cayman Islands	April 2001	2001 Championships	Nassau, Bahamas	
200m individual medley	2:22.80		McKayla Lightbourn	Bahamas	April 2007	2007 Championships	Kingston, Jamaica	
400m individual medley	5:00.35		McKayla Lightbourn	Bahamas	April 2007	2007 Championships	Kingston, Jamaica	
4×50m freestyle relay	1:49.82		Sabrina Lyn; Saviya Officer; Morgan Cogle; Zaneta Alvaranga	Jamaica	23 April 2019	2019 Championships	Bridgetown, Barbados	
4×100m freestyle relay	4:01.04		Anahi Schreuders (1:01.09); Elisabeth Timmer (1:00.56); Keeley Maduro (59.73); Florence Kock (59.66)	Aruba	4 April 2015	2015 Championships	Bridgetown, Barbados	
4×200m freestyle relay	8:59.00		A.Lambert; K.Rabess; S.Royston; R.Embury-Brown	Cayman Islands	April 2019	2019 Championships	Bridgetown, Barbados	
4×100m medley relay	4:33.81		Zaneta Alvaranga; Simone Vale; Amore Hunter; Emily MacDonald	Jamaica	1 April 2018	2018 Championships	Kingston, Jamaica	

Legend: # – Record awaiting ratification by CANOC;
Records not set in finals: h – heat; sf – semifinal; r – relay 1st leg; rh – relay heat 1st leg; b – B final; † – en route to final mark; so – swim-off; tt – time trial

=== Boys (15–17) ===
Event	Time		Name	Nationality	Date	Meet	Location	Ref
50m freestyle	23.18	r	Izaak Bastian	Bahamas	23 April 2019	2019 Championships	Bridgetown, Barbados	
100m freestyle	50.67		Dylan Carter	Trinidad & Tobago	March/April 2013	2013 Championships	Kingston, Jamaica	
200m freestyle	1:50.35		Dylan Carter	Trinidad & Tobago	March/April 2013	2013 Championships	Kingston, Jamaica	
400m freestyle	3:59.79		Joris Bouchaut	Guadeloupe	April 2012	2012 Championships	Nassau, Bahamas	
800m freestyle	8:29.52		Raekwon Noel	Guyana	8 April 2023	2023 Championships	Willemstad, Curaçao	
1500m freestyle	15:45.04		Joris Bouchaut	Guadeloupe	April 2012	2012 Championships	Nassau, Bahamas	
50m backstroke	25.97		Liam Carrington	Trinidad and Tobago	19 April 2025	2025 Championships	Couva, Trinidad and Tobago	
100m backstroke	56.59		Jack Kirby	Barbados	1 April 2018	2018 Championships	Kingston, Jamaica	
200m backstroke	2:04.44		Patrick Groters	Aruba	18 April 2017	2017 Championships	Nassau, Bahamas	
50m breaststroke	28.20		Izaak Bastian	Bahamas	22 April 2019	2019 Championships	Bridgetown, Barbados	
100m breaststroke	1:02.84		Izaak Bastian	Bahamas	23 April 2019	2019 Championships	Bridgetown, Barbados	
200m breaststroke	2:17.78		Izaak Bastian	Bahamas	31 March 2018	2018 Championships	Kingston, Jamaica	
50 m butterfly	24.73		Christian Jerome	Haiti	20 April 2025	2025 Championships	Couva, Trinidad and Tobago	
100m butterfly	54.73		Nigel Forbes	Bahamas	6 April 2023	2023 Championships	Willemstad, Curaçao	
200 m butterfly	2:04.82		Christian Jerome	Haiti	21 April 2025	2025 Championships	Couva, Trinidad and Tobago	
200m individual medley	2:04.69		Patrick Groters	Aruba	22 April 2017	2017 Championships	Nassau, Bahamas	
400m individual medley	4:27.69		Patrick Groters	Aruba	16 April 2017	2017 Championships	Nassau, Bahamas	
4×50m freestyle relay	1:34.86		Nikoli Blackman (23.30); Aaron Stuart (24.68); Zarek Wilson (23.39); Johann Matamoro (23.49)	Trinidad & Tobago	19 April 2022	2022 Championships	Bridgetown, Barbados	
4×100m freestyle relay	3:32.24		A. Bernard (53.05); Z. Anthony (52.91); D. Belfon (54.28); L. Carrington (52.00)	Trinidad and Tobago	2 April 2024	2024 Championships	Nassau, Bahamas	
4×200m freestyle relay	7:54.61		Aricat; Y.Sorel; Y.Baron; S.Lameynardie	Martinique	April 2009	2009 Championships	Savaneta, Aruba	
4×100m medley relay	3:54.32		Davante Carey; Izaak Bastian; Ian Pinder; Kevon Lockhart	Bahamas	21 April 2019	2019 Championships	Bridgetown, Barbados	

Legend: # – Record awaiting ratification by CANOC;
Records not set in finals: h – heat; sf – semifinal; r – relay 1st leg; rh – relay heat 1st leg; b – B final; † – en route to final mark; so – swim-off; tt – time trial

=== Girls (15–17) ===
Event	Time	Name	Club	Date	Meet	Location	Ref
50m freestyle	26.08	Jillian Crooks	Cayman Islands	9 April 2023	2023 Championships	Willemstad, Curaçao	
100m freestyle	56.44	Jillian Crooks	Cayman Islands	8 April 2023	2023 Championships	Willemstad, Curaçao	
200m freestyle	2:03.00	Joanna Evans	Bahamas	5 April 2015	2015 Championships	Bridgetown, Barbados	
400m freestyle	4:16.48	Joanna Evans	Bahamas	7 April 2015	2015 Championships	Bridgetown, Barbados	
800m freestyle	8:43.44	Janelle Atkinson	Jamaica	April 1999	1999 Championships	Kingston, Jamaica	
1500m freestyle	17:35.29	Harper Barrowman	Cayman Islands	1 April 2024	2024 Championships	Nassau, Bahamas	
50m backstroke	29.18	Zuri Ferguson	Trinidad and Tobago	19 April 2025	2025 Championships	Couva, Trinidad and Tobago	
100m backstroke	1:02.82	Zuri Ferguson	Trinidad and Tobago	2 April 2024	2024 Championships	Nassau, Bahamas	
200m backstroke	2:16.04	Zuri Ferguson	Trinidad and Tobago	2 April 2024	2024 Championships	Nassau, Bahamas	
50m breaststroke	32.18	Rhanishka Gibbs	Bahamas	1 April 2024	2024 Championships	Nassau, Bahamas	
100m breaststroke	1:11.92	Lilly Higgs	Bahamas	18 April 2017	2017 Championships	Nassau, Bahamas	
200m breaststroke	2:35.33	Margaret Higgs	Bahamas	22 March 2016	2016 Championships	Fort-de-France, Martinique	
50m butterfly	27.79	Mackenzie Headley	Jamaica	17 April 2022	2022 Championships	Bridgetown, Barbados	
100m butterfly	1:00.22	Jillian Crooks	Cayman Islands	2 April 2024	2024 Championships	Nassau, Bahamas	
200m butterfly	2:18.87	Heather Roffey	Cayman Islands	April 2004	2004 Championships	Nassau, Bahamas	
200m individual medley	2:20.09	McKayla Lightbourn	Bahamas	March 2008	2008 Championships	Savaneta, Aruba	
400m individual medley	4:59.25	Joanna Evans	Bahamas	5 April 2015	2015 Championships	Bridgetown, Barbados	
4×50m freestyle relay	1:47.91	Mackenzie Headley (26.56); Morgan Cogle (27.40); Leanna Wainwright (27.20); Sabrina Lyn (26.75)	Jamaica	19 April 2022	2022 Championships	Bridgetown, Barbados	
4×100m freestyle relay	3:57.63	Lila Higgo (59.15); Jilian Crooks (57.95); Sofia Bonati (1:00.81); Harper Barrowman (59.72)	Cayman Islands	6 April 2023	2023 Championships	Willemstad, Curaçao	
4×200m freestyle relay	8:42.17	Harper Barrowman (2:09.53); Kathryn Lambert-Wragg (2:15.41); Jillian Crooks (2:08.32); Kyra Rabess (2:08.91)	Cayman Islands	18 April 2022	2022 Championships	Bridgetown, Barbados	
4×100m medley relay	4:27.26	Zuri Ferguson (1:03.70); T. Ho A Shu (1:16.26); L. Browne (1:06.32); A. Ash (1:00.98)	Trinidad and Tobago	2 April 2024	2024 Championships	Nassau, Bahamas	

Legend: # – Record awaiting ratification by CANOC;
Records not set in finals: h – heat; sf – semifinal; r – relay 1st leg; rh – relay heat 1st leg; b – B final; † – en route to final mark; so – swim-off; tt – time trial

=== Boys (18 and over) ===
Event	Time	Name	Club	Date	Meet	Location	Ref
50 m freestyle	21.98	Dylan Carter	Trinidad and Tobago	2 April 2024	2024 Championships	Nassau, Bahamas	
100 m freestyle	49.33	Lamar Taylor	Bahamas	1 April 2024	2024 Championships	Nassau, Bahamas	
200 m freestyle							
400 m freestyle							
800 m freestyle							
1500 m freestyle							
50 m backstroke							
100 m backstroke							
200 m backstroke							
50 m breaststroke	29.08	Mark-Anthon Thompson	Bahamas	1 April 2024	2024 Championships	Nassau, Bahamas	
100 m breaststroke							
200 m breaststroke							
50 m butterfly							
100 m butterfly	56.99	Emmanuel Gadson	Bahamas	30 March 2024	2024 Championships	Nassau, Bahamas	
200 m butterfly							
200 m individual medley	2:04.42	Erick Gordillo	Guatemala	1 April 2024	2024 Championships	Nassau, Bahamas	
400 m individual medley							
4×100 m freestyle relay							
4×200 m freestyle relay							
4×100 m medley relay							

Legend: # – Record awaiting ratification by CANOC;
Records not set in finals: h – heat; sf – semifinal; r – relay 1st leg; rh – relay heat 1st leg; b – B final; † – en route to final mark; so – swim-off; tt – time trial

=== Girls (18 and over) ===
Event	Time	Name	Club	Date	Meet	Location	Ref
50 m freestyle							
100 m freestyle	56.69	Sabrina Lyn	Jamaica	1 April 2024	2024 Championships	Nassau, Bahamas	
200 m freestyle							
400 m freestyle							
800 m freestyle							
1500 m freestyle							
50 m backstroke							
100 m backstroke							
200 m backstroke							
50 m breaststroke	32.54	Sabrina Lyn	Jamaica	1 April 2024	2024 Championships	Nassau, Bahamas	
100 m breaststroke							
200 m breaststroke							
50 m butterfly							
100 m butterfly							
200 m butterfly							
200 m individual medley							
400 m individual medley							
4×100 m freestyle relay							
4×200 m freestyle relay							
4×100 m medley relay							

Legend: # – Record awaiting ratification by CANOC;
Records not set in finals: h – heat; sf – semifinal; r – relay 1st leg; rh – relay heat 1st leg; b – B final; † – en route to final mark; so – swim-off; tt – time trial

== See also ==
- Caribbean Free Trade Association (CARIFTA)
- Caribbean Island Swimming Championships (CISCs)
- Central American and Caribbean Swimming Championships (CCCANs)
