= Caribbean Islands Swimming Championships =

Swimming competition

The Caribbean Islands Swimming Championships (CISCs) are biennial aquatics championships held in even years. They are organized by CCCAN and feature age-group competition for teams from Caribbean island nations. They have been held since 1976 and feature competition in five World Aquatics disciplines: swimming, open water, diving, water polo and synchronized swimming.

== Participating countries ==
The CISCs predominantly features teams from the Caribbean, but traditionally also includes Guyana and Suriname, members of CONSANAT--South America's Swimming Confederation.

Twenty (21) countries have been invited to the 2016 Championships:

- Antigua and Barbuda
- Aruba
- Bahamas
- Barbados
- Bermuda
- British Virgin Islands
- Cayman Islands
- Cuba
- Curaçao
- Dominica
- Dominican Republic
- Grenada
- Haiti
- Jamaica
- Puerto Rico
- Saint Kitts and Nevis
- Saint Lucia
- Saint Vincent and the Grenadines
- Trinidad and Tobago
- Turks and Caicos
- Virgin Islands

Residents of the French islands of Guadeloupe and Martinique have also been invited to compete, despite the fact that they technically fall under the jurisdiction of the French Swimming Federation and therefore are considered part of Europe (but geographically are in the Caribbean). Likewise, swimmers from Bonaire, Saba and St. Eustatius (part of the Netherlands) and Saint Martin are also invited.

== Championships ==
Year	Edition	Host city	Country	Events	Winners
1976	1	Kingston	Jamaica		
1978	2	Santo Domingo	Dominican Republic		
1980	3	Mayagüez	Puerto Rico		
1982	4	Havana	Cuba		
1984	5	Port of Spain	Trinidad and Tobago		
1986	6	Willemstad, Curaçao	Netherlands Antilles		
1988	7	Santiago de los Caballeros	Dominican Republic		
1990	8	Willemstad, Curaçao	Netherlands Antilles		
1992	9	Port of Spain	Trinidad and Tobago		
1994	10	Kingston	Jamaica		
1996	11	San Juan	Puerto Rico		
1998	12	Bridgetown	Barbados		
2000	13	Oranjestad	Aruba		
2002	14	Willemstad, Curaçao	Netherlands Antilles		
2004	15	Kingston	Jamaica	200	Puerto Rico
2006	16	Salinas & Caguas	Puerto Rico	200	Puerto Rico
2008	17	Kingston	Jamaica	200	Trinidad and Tobago
2010	18	Havana	Cuba	200	Trinidad and Tobago
2012	19	Savaneta	Aruba	200	Aruba
2014	20	Bridgetown	Barbados	200	Puerto Rico
2016	21	Nassau	Bahamas	200	Bahamas

== Records ==
All records were set in finals unless noted otherwise. All times are swum in a long-course (50m) pool.

=== Boys (11-12) ===
Event	Time		Name	Nationality	Date	Meet	Location	Ref
50m freestyle	25.53		Jesse Washington	Bermuda	27 June 2012	XIX CISC	Savaneta, Aruba	
100m freestyle	56.36		Jesse Washington	Bermuda	23 June 2012	XIX CISC	Savaneta, Aruba	
200m freestyle	2:03.32		Jose Santa	Puerto Rico	July 1986	VI CISC	Willemstad, Curaçao	
400m freestyle	4:26.17		Yael Touw Ngie Tjouw	Suriname	4 July 2014	XX CISC	Bridgetown, Barbados	
50m backstroke	29.63		Yael Touw Ngie Tjouw	Suriname	5 July 2014	XX CISC	Bridgetown, Barbados	
100m backstroke	1:03.07		Yael Touw Ngie Tjouw	Suriname	3 July 2014	XX CISC	Bridgetown, Barbados	
200m backstroke	2:22.08		Yael Touw Ngie Tjouw	Suriname	6 July 2014	XX CISC	Bridgetown, Barbados	
50m breaststroke	33.29	h	McCallum Clarke	Barbados	1 July 2016	XXI CISC	Nassau, The Bahamas	
100m breaststroke	1:10.94		Daniel Chevere	Puerto Rico	4 July 2014	XX CISC	Bridgetown, Barbados	
200m breaststroke	2:36.83		McCallum Clarke	Barbados	29 June 2016	XXI CISC	Nassau, The Bahamas	
50m butterfly	27.80	h	Yael Touw Ngie Tjouw	Suriname	7 July 2014	XX CISC	Bridgetown, Barbados	
100m butterfly	1:00.29		Franz Huggins	Trinidad and Tobago	July 1992	IX CISC	Port of Spain, Trinidad and Tobago	
200m butterfly	2:22.85		Huberto Del Rio	Cuba	2010	XVIII CISC	Havana, Cuba	
200m individual medley	2:19.22		Yael Touw Ngie Tjouw	Suriname	7 July 2014	XX CISC	Bridgetown, Barbados	
4×100m freestyle relay	3:59.57		C. Ramos; A. Lopez; I. Octaviana; J. Seda	Puerto Rico	July 1992	IX CISC	Port of Spain, Trinidad and Tobago	
4×200m freestyle relay	8:56.87		Elmer Rivera (2:15.62); Carlos Paris (2:19.39); Minfer Lebron (2:10.01); Derek Correa (2:11.85)	Puerto Rico	1 July 2016	XXI CISC	Nassau, The Bahamas	
4×100m medley relay	4:30.01		J. Santa; J. Gonzalez; M. Santiago; R. Caragol	Puerto Rico	July 1986	VI CISC	Willemstad, Curaçao	

Legend: # – Record awaiting ratification by CCCAN;
Records not set in finals: h – heat; r – relay 1st leg; rh – relay heat 1st leg; † – en route to final mark; tt – time trial

=== Girls (11-12) ===
Event	Time		Name	Nationality	Date	Meet	Location	Ref
50m freestyle	27.41		Vanessa García	Puerto Rico	July 1996	XI CISC	San Juan, Puerto Rico	
100m freestyle	1:00.26		Emily MacDonald	Jamaica	1 July 2016	XXI CISC	Nassau, The Bahamas	
200m freestyle	2:13.90		Rita Garay	Puerto Rico	July 1984	V CISC	Port of Spain, Trinidad and Tobago	
400m freestyle	4:40.40		Hannah Gill	Barbados	26 June 2012	XIX CISC	Savaneta, Aruba	
50m backstroke	31.98		Sade Simons	Suriname	29 June 2016	XXI CISC	Nassau, The Bahamas	
100m backstroke	1:08.65		Danielle Titus	Barbados	3 July 2014	XX CISC	Bridgetown, Barbados	
200m backstroke	2:30.31		Tyla Martin	Trinidad and Tobago	2010	XVIII CISC	Havana, Cuba	
50m breaststroke	34.92		Chade Nersicio	Curaçao	6 July 2014	XX CISC	Bridgetown, Barbados	
100m breaststroke	1:17.13		Chade Nersicio	Curaçao	4 July 2014	XX CISC	Bridgetown, Barbados	
200m breaststroke	2:50.23		Isvia Cruz	Puerto Rico	July 2000	XIII CISC	Oranjestad, Aruba	
50m butterfly	29.59		Sade Simons	Suriname	30 June 2016	XXI CISC	Nassau, The Bahamas	
100m butterfly	1:06.05		Tyla Martin	Trinidad and Tobago	2010	XVIII CISC	Havana, Cuba	
200m butterfly	2:28.22		Emily Ramirez	Puerto Rico	27 June 2006	XVI CISC	San Huan, Puerto Rico	
200m individual medley	2:31.20	h	Barbara Caraballo	Puerto Rico	18 July 2008	XVII CISC	Kingston, Jamaica	
4×100m freestyle relay	4:12.76		Vanessa García; S. Mojica; E. Lopez; L. Catala	Puerto Rico	July 1996	XI CISC	San Juan, Puerto Rico	
4×200m freestyle relay	9:23.72		Carolina Villarini (2:20.53); Alondra Molina (2:22.15); Milena Guzmán (2:18.62); Ariana Vega (2:22.42)	Puerto Rico	1 July 2016	XXI CISC	Nassau, The Bahamas	
4×100m medley relay	4:47.32		E. Lopez; C. Fodor; L. Catala; Vanessa García	Puerto Rico	July 1996	XI CISC	San Juan, Puerto Rico	

Legend: # – Record awaiting ratification by CCCAN;
Records not set in finals: h – heat; r – relay 1st leg; rh – relay heat 1st leg; † – en route to final mark; tt – time trial

=== Mixed relay (11-12) ===
Event	Time	Name	Nationality	Date	Meet	Location	Ref
4×50m freestyle relay	1:53.38	Lamar Taylor (27.48); Madison Mortimer (29.41); Taro Sears (27.45); Hailey Johnson (29.04)	Bahamas	29 June 2016	XXI CISC	Nassau, The Bahamas	

Legend: # – Record awaiting ratification by CCCAN;
Records not set in finals: h – heat

=== Boys (13-14) ===
Event	Time		Name	Nationality	Date	Meet	Location	Ref
50m freestyle	24.05		Joshua Romany	Trinidad and Tobago	2010	XVIII CISC	Havana, Cuba	
100m freestyle	53.03		Joshua Romany	Trinidad and Tobago	2010	XVIII CISC	Havana, Cuba	
200m freestyle	1:56.49		Jose Santa	Puerto Rico	August 1988	VII CISC	Santiago de los Caballeros, Dominican Republic	
400m freestyle	4:07.25		Damien Alleyne	Barbados	July 1998	XII CISC	Bridgetown, Barbados	
1500m freestyle	16:40.26		George Bovell	Trinidad and Tobago	July 1998	XII CISC	Bridgetown, Barbados	
50m backstroke	27.87	h	Dionisio Carey	Bahamas	25 June 2012	XIX CISC	Savaneta, Aruba	
100m backstroke	58.89		Jarod Arroyo	Puerto Rico	30 June 2016	XXI CISC	Nassau, The Bahamas	
200m backstroke	2:08.44		Jarod Arroyo	Puerto Rico	2 July 2016	XXI CISC	Nassau, The Bahamas	
50m breaststroke	29.68		Izaak Bastian	Bahamas	1 July 2016	XXI CISC	Nassau, The Bahamas	
100m breaststroke	1:06.24		Izaak Bastian	Bahamas	2 July 2016	XXI CISC	Nassau, The Bahamas	
200m breaststroke	2:23.43		Izaak Bastian	Bahamas	29 June 2016	XXI CISC	Nassau, The Bahamas	
50m butterfly	25.75		Yael Touw Ngie Tjouw	Suriname	30 June 2016	XXI CISC	Nassau, The Bahamas	
100m butterfly	57.40		Zuhayr Pigot	Suriname	24 June 2012	XIX CISC	Savaneta, Aruba	
200m butterfly	2:10.38		Andres Solivan	Puerto Rico	25 June 2012	XIX CISC	Savaneta, Aruba	
200m individual medley	2:07.59		Jarod Arroyo	Puerto Rico	1 July 2016	XXI CISC	Nassau, The Bahamas	
400m individual medley	4:30.23		Jarod Arroyo	Puerto Rico	30 June 2016	XXI CISC	Nassau, The Bahamas	
4×100m freestyle relay	3:44.06		Dylan Carter; K. Boisson-Yates; B.Sobrian; Joshua Romany	Trinidad and Tobago	2010	XVIII CISC	Havana, Cuba	
4×200m freestyle relay	8:13.99		Louis Ortiz (2:04.88); Fernando Sedano (1:59.23); Miguel Cancel (1:59.68); Emanuel Vazquez (2:10.20)	Puerto Rico	5 July 2014	XX CISC	Bridgetown, Barbados	
4×100m medley relay	4:05.85		Jarod Arroyo (59.96); Daniel Chevere (1:07.97); Gabriel Melendez (1:03.68); Jan Collazo (54.24)	Puerto Rico	2 July 2016	XXI CISC	Nassau, The Bahamas	

Legend: # – Record awaiting ratification by CCCAN;
Records not set in finals: h – heat; r – relay 1st leg; rh – relay heat 1st leg; † – en route to final mark; tt – time trial

=== Girls (13-14) ===
Event	Time	Name	Nationality	Date	Meet	Location	Ref
50m freestyle	26.56	Chade Nersicio	Curaçao	2 July 2016	XXI CISC	Nassau, The Bahamas	
100m freestyle	58.45	Chade Nersicio	Curaçao	1 July 2016	XXI CISC	Nassau, The Bahamas	
200m freestyle	2:10.12	Elisabeth Timmer	Aruba	30 June 2016	XXI CISC	Nassau, The Bahamas	
400m freestyle	4:30.99	Hannah Gill	Barbados	6 July 2014	XX CISC	Bridgetown, Barbados	
800m freestyle	9:13.49	Hannah Gill	Barbados	3 July 2014	XX CISC	Bridgetown, Barbados	
50m backstroke	30.12	Emma Harvey	Bermuda	29 June 2016	XXI CISC	Nassau, The Bahamas	
100m backstroke	1:05.92	Emma Harvey	Bermuda	30 June 2016	XXI CISC	Nassau, The Bahamas	
200m backstroke	2:25.18	Rita Garay	Puerto Rico	July 1986	VI CISC	Willemstad, Curaçao	
50m breaststroke	34.14	Chade Nersicio	Curaçao	1 July 2016	XXI CISC	Nassau, The Bahamas	
100m breaststroke	1:14.61	Chade Nersicio	Curaçao	2 July 2016	XXI CISC	Nassau, The Bahamas	
200m breaststroke	2:42.74	Albury Higgs	Bahamas	4 July 2014	XX CISC	Bridgetown, Barbados	
50m butterfly	28.55	Emma Harvey	Bermuda	30 June 2016	XXI CISC	Nassau, The Bahamas	
100m butterfly	1:04.20	Emma Harvey	Bermuda	29 June 2016	XXI CISC	Nassau, The Bahamas	
200m butterfly	2:24.26	Zabrina Holder	Barbados	2010	XVIII CISC	Havana, Cuba	
200m individual medley	2:26.07	Albury Higgs	Bahamas	3 July 2014	XX CISC	Bridgetown, Barbados	
400m individual medley	5:17.98	Zabrina Holder	Barbados	2010	XVIII CISC	Havana, Cuba	
4×100m freestyle relay	4:06.66	Daniella van den Berg; Cindy Maduro; Gaby Ponson; Ally Ponson	Aruba	2010	XVIII CISC	Havana, Cuba	
4×200m freestyle relay	8:59.32	McKayla Treasure (2:14.41); Rebecca Lashley (2:20.61); Kendi Bynoe (2:13.47); Hannah Gill (2:10.83)	Barbados	5 July 2014	XX CISC	Bridgetown, Barbados	
4×100m medley relay	4:39.33	Jahmia Harley (1:09.84); Gabriela Donahue (1:18.17); Jada Chai (1:08.34); Danielle Williams (1:02.98)	Trinidad and Tobago	2 July 2016	XXI CISC	Nassau, The Bahamas	

Legend: # – Record awaiting ratification by CCCAN;
Records not set in finals: h – heat; r – relay 1st leg; rh – relay heat 1st leg; † – en route to final mark; tt – time trial

=== Mixed relay (13-14) ===
Event	Time	Name	Nationality	Date	Meet	Location	Ref
4×50m freestyle relay	1:45.64	Christopher Marlin (25.05); Chade Nersicio (26.33); Toon de Lau (26.53); Tiareth Cijntje (27.73)	Curaçao	29 June 2016	XXI CISC	Nassau, The Bahamas	

Legend: # – Record awaiting ratification by CCCAN;
Records not set in finals: h – heat

=== Boys (15-17) ===
Event	Time		Name	Nationality	Date	Meet	Location	Ref
50m freestyle	23.39		Dylan Carter	Trinidad and Tobago	25 June 2012	XIX CISC	Savaneta, Aruba	
100m freestyle	51.07	h	Mikel Schreuders	Aruba	1 July 2016	XXI CISC	Nassau, The Bahamas	
200m freestyle	1:53.62		Mikel Schreuders	Aruba	30 June 2016	XXI CISC	Nassau, The Bahamas	
400m freestyle	3:57.30		Alex Sobers	Barbados	2 July 2016	XXI CISC	Nassau, The Bahamas	
1500m freestyle	15:58.66		Jorge Herrera	Puerto Rico	August 1988	VII CISC	Santiago de los Caballeros, Dominican Republic	
50m backstroke	26.96		David McLeod	Trinidad and Tobago	5 July 2014	XX CISC	Bridgetown, Barbados	
100m backstroke	57.46	h	Keanan Dols	Jamaica	30 June 2016	XXI CISC	Nassau, The Bahamas	
200m backstroke	2:03.05		Keanan Dols	Jamaica	2 July 2016	XXI CISC	Nassau, The Bahamas	
50m breaststroke	29.00		Jeron Thompson	Trinidad and Tobago	1 July 2016	XXI CISC	Nassau, The Bahamas	
100m breaststroke	1:04.82		Jeron Thompson	Trinidad and Tobago	2 July 2016	XXI CISC	Nassau, The Bahamas	
200m breaststroke	2:19.50		Adriel Sanes	U.S. Virgin Islands	29 June 2016	XXI CISC	Nassau, The Bahamas	
50m butterfly	24.53		Dylan Carter	Trinidad and Tobago	23 June 2012	XIX CISC	Savaneta, Aruba	
100m butterfly	55.41		Cadell Lyons	Trinidad and Tobago	2010	XVIII CISC	Havana, Cuba	
200m butterfly	2:03.31		Filiberto Colon	Puerto Rico	April 1982	IV CISC	Havana, Cuba	
200m individual medley	2:06.19		Patrick Groters	Aruba	1 July 2016	XXI CISC	Nassau, The Bahamas	
400m individual medley	4:34.99		Arsenio López	Puerto Rico	July 1996	XI CISC	San Juan, Puerto Rico	
4×100m freestyle relay	3:32.12		Jared Fitzgerald (52.29); Miller Albury (53.30); N'Nhyn Fernander (52.74); Gershwin Greene (53.79)	Bahamas	30 June 2016	XXI CISC	Nassau, The Bahamas	
4×200m freestyle relay	7:55.80		Daniel Jacobs (1:56.72); Joseph Winterdal (2:03.69); Patrick Groters (1:59.72); Mikel Schreuders (1:55.67)	Aruba	1 July 2016	XXI CISC	Nassau, The Bahamas	
4×100m medley relay	3:54.79		Patrick Groters (59.01); Mikel Schreuders (1:05.58); Joseph Winterdal (57.15); Daniel Jacobs (53.05)	Aruba	2 July 2016	XXI CISC	Nassau, The Bahamas	

Legend: # – Record awaiting ratification by CCCAN;
Records not set in finals: h – heat; r – relay 1st leg; rh – relay heat 1st leg; † – en route to final mark; tt – time trial

=== Girls (15-17) ===
Event	Time		Name	Nationality	Date	Meet	Location	Ref
50m freestyle	25.91		Leah Martindale	Barbados	July 1996	XI CISC	San Juan, Puerto Rico	
100m freestyle	56.74		Leah Martindale	Barbados	July 1996	XI CISC	San Juan, Puerto Rico	
200m freestyle	2:06.68		Janelle Atkinson	Jamaica	July 1998	XII CISC	Bridgetown, Barbados	
400m freestyle	4:24.59		Janelle Atkinson	Jamaica	July 1998	XII CISC	Bridgetown, Barbados	
800m freestyle	8:56.76		Janelle Atkinson	Jamaica	July 1998	XII CISC	Bridgetown, Barbados	
50m backstroke	29.81		Kristin Julien	Trinidad and Tobago	5 July 2014	XX CISC	Bridgetown, Barbados	
100m backstroke	1:05.22		Kristin Julien	Trinidad and Tobago	4 July 2014	XX CISC	Bridgetown, Barbados	
200m backstroke	2:20.38		Laura Rodríguez	Dominican Republic	5 July 2004	XV CISC	Kingston, Jamaica	
50m breaststroke	33.43		Alia Atkinson	Jamaica	5 July 2004	XV CISC	Kingston, Jamaica	
100m breaststroke	1:13.24		Alia Atkinson	Jamaica	6 July 2004	XV CISC	Kingston, Jamaica	
200m breaststroke	2:36.83		Albury Higgs	Bahamas	29 June 2016	XXI CISC	Nassau, The Bahamas	
50m butterfly	28.44		Celismar Guzman	Puerto Rico	30 June 2016	XXI CISC	Nassau, The Bahamas	
100m butterfly	1:03.48	h	Kelsie Campbell	Jamaica	29 June 2016	XXI CISC	Nassau, The Bahamas	
200m butterfly	2:22.94		Marines Rosario	Puerto Rico	5 July 2014	XX CISC	Bridgetown, Barbados	
200m individual medley	2:23.57		Alia Atkinson	Jamaica	6 July 2004	XV CISC	Kingston, Jamaica	
400m individual medley	5:05.59		Albury Higgs	Bahamas	30 June 2016	XXI CISC	Nassau, The Bahamas	
4×100m freestyle relay	4:00.25		Anahi Schreuders (59.64); Keeley Maduro (1:00.44); Rebecca Maduro (1:00.94); Florence Kock (59.23)	Aruba	30 June 2016	XXI CISC	Nassau, The Bahamas	
4×200m freestyle relay	8:47.43		Julliana de Jesus (2:10.32); Marissa Lugo (2:15.11); Laura Figueroa (2:11.01); Celismar Guzman (2:10.99)	Puerto Rico	1 July 2016	XXI CISC	Nassau, The Bahamas	
4×100m medley relay	4:29.98		Celismar Guzman (1:05.94); Jadiana Pérez (1:16.65); Greta Gonzalez (1:08.24); Laura Figueroa (59.15)	Puerto Rico	2 July 2016	XXI CISC	Nassau, The Bahamas	

Legend: # – Record awaiting ratification by CCCAN;
Records not set in finals: h – heat; r – relay 1st leg; rh – relay heat 1st leg; † – en route to final mark; tt – time trial

=== Mixed relay (15-17) ===
Event	Time	Name	Nationality	Date	Meet	Location	Ref
4×50m freestyle relay	1:43.07	Joseph Winterdal (24.82); Florence Kock (27.66); Anahi Schreuders (26.95); Mikel Schreuders (23.64)	Aruba	29 June 2016	XXI CISC	Nassau, The Bahamas	

Legend: # – Record awaiting ratification by CCCAN;
Records not set in finals: h – heat

=== Boys (18 and over) ===
Event	Time		Name	Nationality	Date	Meet	Location	Ref
50m freestyle	22.54		Renzo Tjon-A-Joe	Suriname	2 July 2016	XXI CISC	Nassau, The Bahamas	
100m freestyle	49.33		Dylan Carter	Trinidad and Tobago	1 July 2016	XXI CISC	Nassau, The Bahamas	
200m freestyle	1:48.44	tt	Dylan Carter	Trinidad and Tobago	2016	XXI CISC	Nassau, The Bahamas	
400m freestyle	4:01.07		Matthew Lowe	Bahamas	2 July 2016	XXI CISC	Nassau, The Bahamas	
1500m freestyle	16:22.01		Matthew Lowe	Bahamas	29 June 2016	XXI CISC	Nassau, The Bahamas	
50m backstroke	26.39		George Bovell	Trinidad and Tobago	4 July 2004	XV CISC	Kingston, Jamaica	
100m backstroke	56.05		Dylan Carter	Trinidad and Tobago	30 June 2016	XXI CISC	Nassau, The Bahamas	
200m backstroke	2:03.37		Pedro Medel	Cuba	2010	XVIII CISC	Havana, Cuba	
50m breaststroke	28.18		Dustin Tynes	Bahamas	1 July 2016	XXI CISC	Nassau, The Bahamas	
100m breaststroke	1:02.55		Dustin Tynes	Bahamas	2 July 2016	XXI CISC	Nassau, The Bahamas	
200m breaststroke	2:20.39		Jordy Groters	Aruba	29 June 2016	XXI CISC	Nassau, The Bahamas	
50m butterfly	24.21		Justin Plaschka	Jamaica	30 June 2016	XXI CISC	Nassau, The Bahamas	
100m butterfly	53.86	tt	Zuhayr Pigot	Suriname	2016	XXI CISC	Nassau, The Bahamas	
200m butterfly	2:07.01		Matthew Houllier	Trinidad and Tobago	4 July 2004	XV CISC	Kingston, Jamaica	
200m individual medley	2:08.79		Jean Luis Gomez	Dominican Republic	27 June 2012	XIX CISC	Savaneta, Aruba	
400m individual medley	4:37.97		Jean Luis Gomez	Dominican Republic	23 June 2012	XIX CISC	Savaneta, Aruba	
4×100m freestyle relay	3:27.09		Jabari Baptiste (52.84); Caryle Blondell (50.82); Dylan Carter (51.41); Joshua McLeod (52.02)	Trinidad and Tobago	30 June 2016	XXI CISC	Nassau, The Bahamas	
4×200m freestyle relay	7:54.27		Dylan Carter (1:50.89); Jabari Baptiste; Jivan Chee Foon; David McLeod (1:58.50)	Trinidad and Tobago	1 July 2016	XXI CISC	Nassau, The Bahamas	
4×100m medley relay	3:49.83		Matthew Lowe (1:01.05); Dustin Tynes (1:02.21); Vereance Burrows (54.84); Armando Moss (51.73)	Bahamas	2 July 2016	XXI CISC	Nassau, The Bahamas	

Legend: # – Record awaiting ratification by CCCAN;
Records not set in finals: h – heat; r – relay 1st leg; rh – relay heat 1st leg; † – en route to final mark; tt – time trial

=== Girls (18 and over) ===
Event	Time	Name	Nationality	Date	Meet	Location	Ref
50m freestyle	25.90	Cherelle Thompson	Trinidad and Tobago	2 July 2016	XXI CISC	Nassau, The Bahamas	
100m freestyle	56.74	Joanna Evans	Bahamas	1 July 2016	XXI CISC	Nassau, The Bahamas	
200m freestyle	2:02.95	Joanna Evans	Bahamas	30 June 2016	XXI CISC	Nassau, The Bahamas	
400m freestyle	4:14.11	Joanna Evans	Bahamas	2 July 2016	XXI CISC	Nassau, The Bahamas	
800m freestyle	8:40.68	Joanna Evans	Bahamas	29 June 2016	XXI CISC	Nassau, The Bahamas	
50m backstroke	29.61	Kiera Aitken	Bermuda	2010	XVIII CISC	Havana, Cuba	
100m backstroke	1:04.23	Kiera Aitken	Bermuda	2010	XVIII CISC	Havana, Cuba	
200m backstroke	2:19.89	Gretchen Gotay	Puerto Rico	5 July 2004	XV CISC	Kingston, Jamaica	
50m breaststroke	32.44	Evita Leter	Suriname	1 July 2016	XXI CISC	Nassau, The Bahamas	
100m breaststroke	1:12.01	Lisa Blackburn	Bermuda	27 June 2012	XIX CISC	Savaneta, Aruba	
200m breaststroke	2:38.13	Jane Copland	U.S. Virgin Islands	3 July 2004	XV CISC	Kingston, Jamaica	
50m butterfly	26.79	Arianna Vanderpool-Wallace	Bahamas	30 June 2016	XXI CISC	Nassau, The Bahamas	
100m butterfly	1:00.01	Arianna Vanderpool-Wallace	Bahamas	29 June 2016	XXI CISC	Nassau, The Bahamas	
200m butterfly	2:19.79	Yumileysis Morales	Cuba	2010	XVIII CISC	Havana, Cuba	
200m individual medley	2:20.94	Barbara Caraballo	Puerto Rico	3 July 2014	XX CISC	Bridgetown, Barbados	
400m individual medley	5:03.37	Sonia Alverez	Puerto Rico	4 July 2002	XIV CISC	Willemstad, Curaçao	
4×100m freestyle relay	3:58.12	Joanna Evans (57.34); Bria Deveaux (59.61); Laura Morley (1:04.09); Arianna Vanderpool-Wallace (57.08)	Bahamas	30 June 2016	XXI CISC	Nassau, The Bahamas	
4×200m freestyle relay	8:41.81	Janelle Atkinson; Tamara Swaby; Amelia Thompson; Angela Chuck	Jamaica	4 July 2004	XV CISC	Kingston, Jamaica	
4×100m medley relay	4:28.73	Gretchen Gotay; Alejandra Gonzalez; Vanessa Martínez; Solmari Mojica	Puerto Rico	5 July 2004	XV CISC	Kingston, Jamaica	

Legend: # – Record awaiting ratification by CCCAN;
Records not set in finals: h – heat; r – relay 1st leg; rh – relay heat 1st leg; † – en route to final mark; tt – time trial

=== Mixed relay (18 and over) ===
Event	Time	Name	Nationality	Date	Meet	Location	Ref
4×50m freestyle relay	1:36.61	Dylan Carter (22.67); Johnnya Ferdinand (25.97); Cherelle Thompson (25.52); Caryle Blondell (22.45)	Trinidad and Tobago	29 June 2016	XXI CISC	Nassau, The Bahamas	

Legend: # – Record awaiting ratification by CCCAN;
Records not set in finals: h – heat
