= List of Turks and Caicos Islands records in swimming =

The Turks and Caicos Islands records in swimming are the fastest ever performances of swimmers from the Turks and Caicos Islands, which are recognised and ratified by the Turks and Caicos Islands Swim Federation.

All records were set in finals unless noted otherwise.

== Long Course (50 m) ==
=== Men ===
| Event | Time | | Name | Club | Date | Meet | Location | Ref |
|---|---|---|---|---|---|---|---|---|
| 50 m freestyle | 25.35 | h | Tajhari Williams | Turks and Caicos Islands | 16 February 2024 | World Championships | Doha, Qatar | |
| 100 m freestyle | 56.43 | h | Tajhari Williams | Turks and Caicos Islands | 1 April 2024 | CARIFTA Championships | Nassau, Bahamas | |
| 200 m freestyle | 2:10.38 | h | Tajhari Williams | Turks and Caicos Islands | 6 April 2023 | CARIFTA Championships | Willemstad, Curaçao | |
| 400 m freestyle | 5:00.07 | | Jayden Davis | TS Aquatics | 3 February 2024 | Karl Dalhouse Swim Meet | Kingston, Jamaica | |
| 800 m freestyle | 9:56.87 | | Isaac Farley | Caerphilly County Swim Squad | 2024 | Caerphilly Invitational | Caerphilly, United Kingdom | |
| 1500 m freestyle | 20:30.53 | | Tajhari Williams | Turks and Caicos Islands | 23 June 2021 | CCCAN Championships | San Juan, Puerto Rico | |
| 50 m backstroke | 28.69 | h | Rohan Shearer | Turks and Caicos Islands | 31 July 2022 | Commonwealth Games | Birmingham, United Kingdom | |
| 100 m backstroke | 1:03.16 | h | Rohan Shearer | Turks and Caicos Islands | 29 July 2022 | Commonwealth Games | Birmingham, United Kingdom | |
| 200 m backstroke | 2:30.07 | h | Tajhari Williams | Turks and Caicos Islands | 6 April 2023 | CARIFTA Championships | Willemstad, Curaçao | |
| 50 m breaststroke | 33.09 | h | Luke Haywood | Turks and Caicos Islands | 31 March 2018 | CARIFTA Championships | St. Andrew, Jamaica | |
| 100 m breaststroke | 1:13.82 | h | Luke Haywood | Turks and Caicos Islands | 31 March 2018 | CARIFTA Championships | St. Andrew, Jamaica | |
| 200 m breaststroke | 2:40.39 | h | Luke Haywood | Turks and Caicos Islands | 31 March 2018 | CARIFTA Championships | St. Andrew, Jamaica | |
| 50 m butterfly | 26.99 | | Jayden Davis | Turks and Caicos Islands | 4 April 2024 | CARIFTA Championships | Nassau, Bahamas | |
| 100 m butterfly | 1:01.55 | | Jayden Davis | Turks and Caicos Islands | 4 April 2024 | CARIFTA Championships | Nassau, Bahamas | |
| 200 m butterfly | | | | | | | | |
| 200 m individual medley | 2:35.91 | | Luke Haywood | Turks and Caicos Islands | 15 April 2017 | CARIFTA Championships | Nassau, Bahamas | |
| 200 m individual medley | 2:31.89 | h, # | Jayden Davis | Turks and Caicos Islands | 7 July 2023 | FG BB Championships North | Miami, United States | |
| 400 m individual medley | | | | | | | | |
| 4×100 m freestyle relay | 4:12.46 | | Tajhari Williams (1:00.65); Jayden Davis (1:06.60); Sean Walters (1:07.75); Rohan Shearer (57.46) | Turks and Caicos Islands | 16 April 2022 | CARIFTA Championships | Bridgetown, Barbados | |
| 4×200 m freestyle relay | | | | | | | | |
| 4×100 m medley relay | 4:50.18 | | Rohan Shearer (1:07.55); Sean Walters (1:27.29); Jayden Davis (1:17.04); Tajhari Williams (58.30) | Turks and Caicos Islands | 16 April 2022 | CARIFTA Championships | Bridgetown, Barbados | |

Legend: # – Record awaiting ratification by Turks and Caicos Islands Swim Federation; WR – World record; AM – Americas record; e – equalled existing record;
Records not set in finals: h – heat; sf – semifinal; r – relay 1st leg; rh – relay heat 1st leg; b – B final; † – en route to final mark; so – swim-off; tt – time trial

=== Women ===
| Event | Time | | Name | Club | Date | Meet | Location | Ref |
|---|---|---|---|---|---|---|---|---|
| 50 m freestyle | 28.46 | h | Arleigha Hall | Turks and Caicos Islands | 2 April 2018 | CARIFTA Championships | St. Andrew, Jamaica | |
| 100 m freestyle | 1:07.34 | h | Thais Burgess | Turks and Caicos Islands | 8 April 2023 | CARIFTA Championships | Willemstad, Curaçao | |
| 200 m freestyle | 2:34.89 | h | Thais Burgess | Turks and Caicos Islands | 7 April 2023 | CARIFTA Championships | Willemstad, Curaçao | |
| 400 m freestyle | | | | | | | | |
| 800 m freestyle | | | | | | | | |
| 1500 m freestyle | | | | | | | | |
| 50 m backstroke | 33.81 | h | Angelina Lindenhahn | Turks and Caicos Islands | 6 April 2023 | CARIFTA Championships | Willemstad, Curaçao | |
| 100 m backstroke | 1:19.06 | h | Angelina Lindenhahn | Turks and Caicos Islands | 7 April 2023 | CARIFTA Championships | Willemstad, Curaçao | |
| 200 m backstroke | | | | | | | | |
| 50 m breaststroke | 41.01 | h | Thais Burgess | Turks and Caicos Islands | 8 April 2023 | CARIFTA Championships | Willemstad, Curaçao | |
| 100 m breaststroke | 1:31.25 | h | Thais Burgess | Turks and Caicos Islands | 8 April 2023 | CARIFTA Championships | Willemstad, Curaçao | |
| 200 m breaststroke | 3:27.98 | h | Thais Burgess | Turks and Caicos Islands | 30 March 2024 | CARIFTA Championships | Nassau, Bahamas | |
| 50m butterfly | 35.27 | | Thais Burgess | Provo | 27 May 2023 | Mako 3rd Annual Oak Tree Medical Invite | Nassau, Bahamas | |
| 100 m butterfly | 1:25.85 | | Thais Burgess | Provo | 2 February 2020 | Karl Dalhouse Memorial | Kingston, Jamaica | |
| 200 m butterfly | | | | | | | | |
| 200 m individual medley | 3:02.46 | h | Thais Burgess | Turks and Caicos Islands | 8 April 2023 | CARIFTA Championships | Willemstad, Curaçao | |
| 400 m individual medley | | | | | | | | |
| 4×100 m freestyle relay | | | | | | | | |
| 4×200 m freestyle relay | | | | | | | | |
| 4×100 m medley relay | | | | | | | | |

Legend: # – Record awaiting ratification by Turks and Caicos Islands Swim Federation; WR – World record; AM – Americas record; e – equalled existing record;
Records not set in finals: h – heat; sf – semifinal; r – relay 1st leg; rh – relay heat 1st leg; b – B final; † – en route to final mark; so – swim-off; tt – time trial

== Short Course (25 m) ==
=== Men ===
| Event | Time | | Name | Club | Date | Meet | Location | Ref |
|---|---|---|---|---|---|---|---|---|
| 50m freestyle | 25.47 | h | Rohan Shearer | Turks and Caicos Islands | 18 December 2021 | World Championships | Abu Dhabi, United Arab Emirates | |
| 100 m freestyle | | | | | | | | |
| 200 m freestyle | | | | | | | | |
| 400 m freestyle | | | | | | | | |
| 800 m freestyle | | | | | | | | |
| 1500 m freestyle | | | | | | | | |
| 50 m backstroke | | | | | | | | |
| 100 m backstroke | | | | | | | | |
| 200 m backstroke | | | | | | | | |
| 50m breaststroke | 31.62 | h | Luke Haywood | Turks and Caicos Islands | 15 December 2018 | World Championships | Hangzhou, China | |
| 100m breaststroke | 1:09.30 | h | Luke Haywood | Turks and Caicos Islands | 11 December 2018 | World Championships | Hangzhou, China | |
| 200 m breaststroke | | | | | | | | |
| 50m butterfly | 30.21 | h | Jack Parlee | Turks and Caicos Islands | 14 December 2018 | World Championships | Hangzhou, China | |
| 100 m butterfly | | | | | | | | |
| 200 m butterfly | | | | | | | | |
| 100 m individual medley | | | | | | | | |
| 200 m individual medley | | | | | | | | |
| 400 m individual medley | | | | | | | | |
| 4×50 m freestyle relay | | | | | | | | |
| 4×100 m freestyle relay | | | | | | | | |
| 4×200 m freestyle relay | | | | | | | | |
| 4×50 m medley relay | | | | | | | | |
| 4×100 m medley relay | | | | | | | | |

Legend: # – Record awaiting ratification by Turks and Caicos Islands Swim Federation; WR – World record; AM – Americas record; e – equalled existing record;
Records not set in finals: h – heat; sf – semifinal; r – relay 1st leg; rh – relay heat 1st leg; b – B final; † – en route to final mark; so – swim-off; tt – time trial

=== Women ===
| Event | Time | | Name | Club | Date | Meet | Location | Ref |
|---|---|---|---|---|---|---|---|---|
| 50m freestyle | 27.31 | h | Arleigha Hall | Turks and Caicos Islands | 15 December 2018 | World Championships | Hangzhou, China | |
| 100m freestyle | 1:10.46 | h | Alex Maclaren | Turks and Caicos Islands | 12 December 2018 | World Championships | Hangzhou, China | |
| 200 m freestyle | | | | | | | | |
| 400 m freestyle | | | | | | | | |
| 800 m freestyle | | | | | | | | |
| 1500 m freestyle | | | | | | | | |
| 50 m backstroke | 32.70 | h | Arleigha Hall | Turks and Caicos Islands | 19 December 2021 | World Championships | Abu Dhabi, United Arab Emirates | |
| 100 m backstroke | | | | | | | | |
| 200 m backstroke | | | | | | | | |
| 50 m breaststroke | | | | | | | | |
| 100 m breaststroke | | | | | | | | |
| 200 m breaststroke | | | | | | | | |
| 50m butterfly | 30.95 | h | Arleigha Hall | Turks and Caicos Islands | 13 December 2018 | World Championships | Hangzhou, China | |
| 100 m butterfly | | | | | | | | |
| 200 m butterfly | | | | | | | | |
| 100m individual medley | 1:19.83 | h | Alex Maclaren | Turks and Caicos Islands | 13 December 2018 | World Championships | Hangzhou, China | |
| 200 m individual medley | | | | | | | | |
| 400 m individual medley | | | | | | | | |
| 4×50 m freestyle relay | | | | | | | | |
| 4×100 m freestyle relay | | | | | | | | |
| 4×200 m freestyle relay | | | | | | | | |
| 4×50 m medley relay | | | | | | | | |
| 4×100 m medley relay | | | | | | | | |

Legend: # – Record awaiting ratification by Turks and Caicos Islands Swim Federation; WR – World record; AM – Americas record; e – equalled existing record;
Records not set in finals: h – heat; sf – semifinal; r – relay 1st leg; rh – relay heat 1st leg; b – B final; † – en route to final mark; so – swim-off; tt – time trial

=== Mixed relay ===
| Event | Time | | Name | Club | Date | Meet | Location | Ref |
|---|---|---|---|---|---|---|---|---|
| 4×50m freestyle relay | 1:52.11 | h | Arleigha Hall (27.37); Jack Parlee (27.48); Alex Maclaren (31.49); Luke Haywood (25.77) | Turks and Caicos Islands | 12 December 2018 | World Championships | Hangzhou, China | |
| 4×50m medley relay | 2:05.12 | h | Alex Maclaren (36.07); Luke Haywood (31.31); Jack Parlee (29.70); Arleigha Hall (28.04) | Turks and Caicos Islands | 13 December 2018 | World Championships | Hangzhou, China | |

Legend: # – Record awaiting ratification by Turks and Caicos Islands Swim Federation; e – equalled existing record;
Records not set in finals: h – heat; so – swim-off
