= Benjamin Davies =

Benjamin Davies or Ben Davies may refer to:

== Arts and entertainment ==
- Benjamin Davies (actor) (born 1980), Scottish actor and producer
- Ben Davies, creator of 2024 Australian TV series Territory
- Ben Davies, UK TV producer of Dragons’ Den
- Ben Davies (tenor) (1858–1943), Welsh operatic tenor
- Ben Davies (Independent minister and author) (1840–1930), Welsh Independent minister and author
- Ben Davies (poet) (1864–1937), Welsh poet and Independent minister

== Sportsmen ==
=== Footballers ===
- Ben Davies (1880s footballer), English footballer for Port Vale
- Ben Davies (footballer, born 1888) (1888–1970), English footballer born in Middlesbrough
- Ben Davies (1930s footballer), English goalkeeper born in Wolverhampton
- Ben Davies (footballer, born 1981), English footballer born in Birmingham
- Ben Davies (Australian footballer) (born 1986), Australian rules footballer
- Ben Davies (footballer, born 1993), Wales international footballer
- Ben Davies (footballer, born 1995), English footballer born in Barrow-in-Furness, Cumbria

=== Rugby ===
- Ben Davies (rugby union) (1873–1930), Wales international rugby player
- Ben Davies (rugby league, born 1989), English rugby league footballer born in Wigan
- Ben Davies (rugby league, born 2000), English rugby league footballer born in Widnes

=== Other sportsmen ===
- Ben Davies (ice hockey) (born 1991), Welsh ice hockey player
- Ben Davies, pool player, 2005 EUKPF World Champion, 2018 IPA World Champion

== Other people ==
- Benjamin Davies (Hebraist) (1814–1875), Welsh Hebraist
- Benjamin Davies (politician) (1813–1904), Canadian politician
- Ben Davies (Hollyoaks), a character in Hollyoaks

== See also ==
- Ben Davis (disambiguation)
- Ben-Ryan Davies (born 1988), English actor
