= Nathaniel Thomas =

Nathaniel Thomas may refer to:

- Nathaniel Thomas (writer) (1730–?), Welsh writer and editor
- Nathaniel Phillips Smith Thomas (1844–1890), American politician from Rhode Island
- Nathaniel Thomas (Massachusetts judge) (1643–1718), English colonial magistrate, politician, and militia officer
- Nathaniel S. Thomas (1867–1937), bishop of the Episcopal Diocese of Wyoming
