= Benjamin Davis Jr. =

Benjamin Davis Jr. may refer to

- Benjamin J. Davis Jr. (1903–1964), New York Communist city councilman, imprisoned for violations of the Smith Act
- Benjamin O. Davis Jr. (1912–2002), American general, commander of the World War II Tuskegee Airmen

== See also ==
- Benjamin Davis (disambiguation)
