= Ben Davies (Independent minister and author) =

Welsh clergyman (1840-1930)

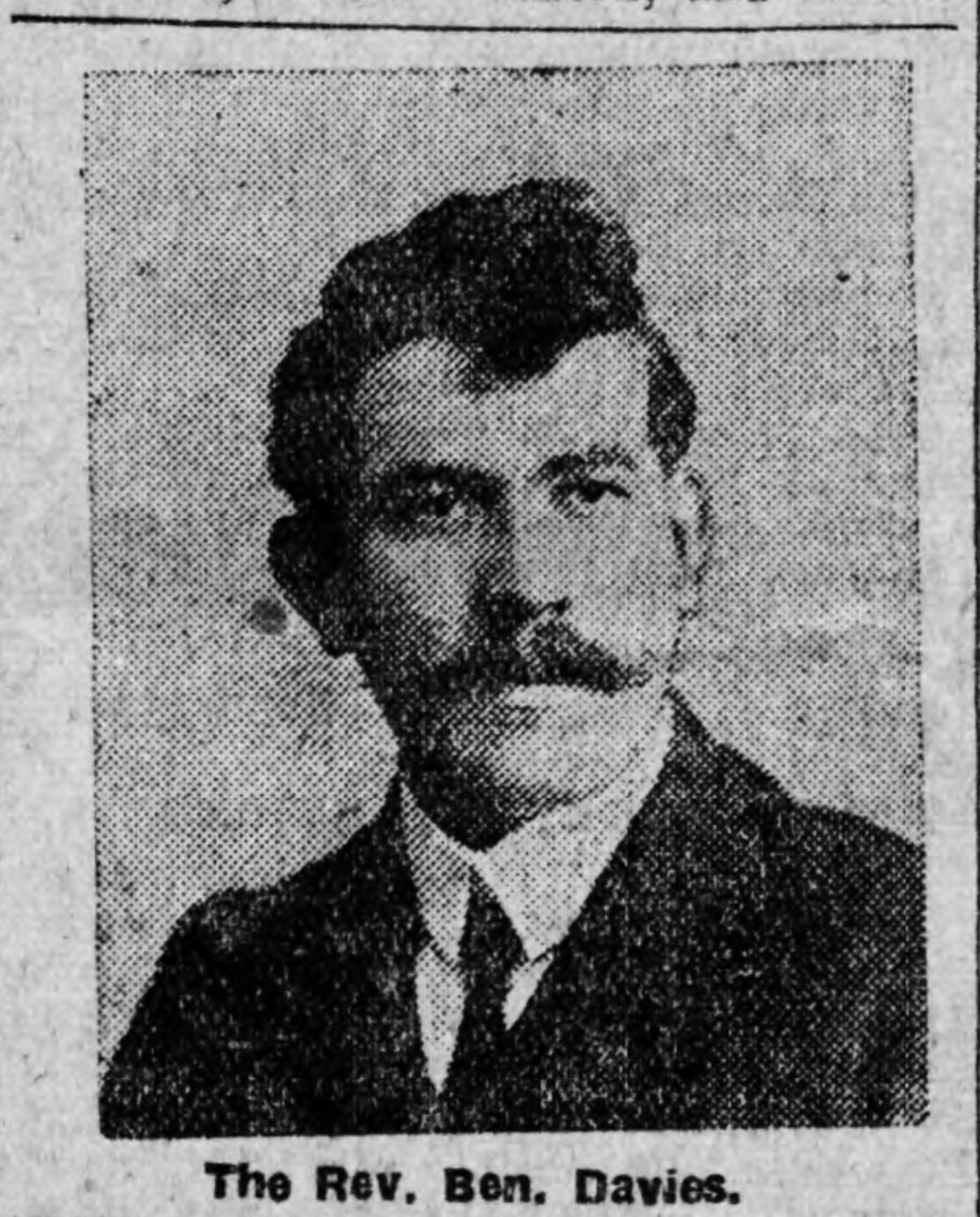
Ben Davies (Capel Iwan)

Ben Davies (1840 - 1930) was a Welsh Independent minister and author.

== Biography ==
He grew up in the Rhondda area, where an early age he entered employment as a coal miner, but managed to educate himself to some extent, and joined Cymer Church, where he was encouraged to begin preaching. He later held positions at the Tabernacle at Treorchy, Trelech and Capel Iwan, and Ebenezer, Newcastle Emlyn.

His writings include four volumes of sermons, 'Gair y Cymod' (published 1882), 'Y Bywyd Annherfynol', 'Pyrth Seion', and 'Y Gronyn Gwenith', and miscellaneous writings such as, 'Y Pulpud a'r Seddau' (1909).

He died in August 1930.
