= Tessa Solomon =

Curaçao swimmer (born 1979)

- Born: January 12, 1979 (age 47); Willemstad, Curaçao
- Occupation: Swimming

Tessa Solomon (born January 12, 1979, in Willemstad, Curaçao) is a retired Curaçao swimmer, who specialized in backstroke events. She is a member of the Florida Atlantic Owls swimming and diving team under head coach Steve Eckelkamp, and also, a business graduate at the Florida Atlantic University in Boca Raton, Florida.

Solomon competed for the Netherlands Antilles in the 100m backstroke at the 2000 Summer Olympics in Sydney. She achieved a FINA B-cut of 1:04.94 from the Pan American Games in Winnipeg, Manitoba, Canada. Swimming in heat two, Solomon decided to scratch out from the race, and then withdrew from the Games for personal and health reasons.
