= Elan Daley =

Bermudian swimmer (born 2005)

Personal information
- Full name: Elan Nichele Daley
- Nationality: Bermudian, Canadian
- Born: 27 February 2005 (age 21) Paget Parish, Bermuda

Sport
- Sport: Swimming

Elan Nichele Daley (born 27 February 2005) is a Bermudian and Canadian swimmer. She represented Bermuda at the 2019 World Aquatics Championships held in Gwangju, South Korea. She competed in the women's 100 metre freestyle and women's 200 metre freestyle events. In both events she did not advance to compete in the semi-finals. She switched to represent Canada internationally, a country she resided in for 9 years, due to complications with training after the COVID-19 pandemic. In 2026, she opted to represent Bermuda internationally again.
