= Nathaniel Phillips Smith Thomas =

American politician (1844–1890)

Member of the Rhode Island General Assembly
- In office 1874–1876

Personal details
- Born: November 17, 1844 Wickford, Rhode Island, U.S.
- Died: May 12, 1890 (aged 45) Providence, Rhode Island, U.S.
- Party: Republican
- Education: Yale College; Columbia Law School
- Occupation: Politician; lawyer

Nathaniel Phillips Smith Thomas (November 17, 1844 – May 12, 1890) was an American politician and lawyer from Rhode Island.

== Early life ==
Nathaniel Phillips Smith Thomas was born on November 17, 1844, in Wickford, Rhode Island, to Charlotte P. (née Smith) and Allen M. Thomas. He was commodore's aid in the United States Navy. He graduated from Yale College in 1868. He then studied law in Providence. He graduated from Columbia Law School in May 1870.

== Career ==
Thomas began practicing law in Minneapolis. In 1873, he moved back to Wickford and opened a law office in Providence.

In 1874, Thomas was elected to the Rhode Island General Assembly. He was re-elected in 1875. He served as clerk of the Rhode Island Senate from 1874 to 1879. He was secretary of the Republican State Central Committee for years. From 1879 to 1889, he was a state commissioner of the shell fisheries commission.

== Personal life ==
Thomas did not marry. He had angina pectoris for over two years. He had la grippe and pneumonia in January 1890. He died of heart disease on May 12, 1890, at his home in Providence.
