= Honia Ibrahim =

Iraqi swimmer

Personal information
- Born: 20 December 2001 (age 24)

Sport
- Sport: Swimming

Honia Ibrahim (born 20 December 2001) is an Iraqi swimmer. She competed in the women's 200 metre breaststroke event at the 2017 World Aquatics Championships.
