= Matthew Lowe (swimmer) =

Bahamian swimmer (born 1994)

Personal information
- Born: 30 March 1994 (age 32)

Sport
- Sport: Swimming

Matthew Lowe (born 30 March 1994) is a Bahamian swimmer. He competed in the men's 200 metre freestyle event at the 2017 World Aquatics Championships.
