= Benjamin Davis =

Benjamin or Ben Davis may refer to:

== People ==
=== Entertainment ===
- Ben Davis (art critic) (fl. 2005–2013), American art critic and author of 9.5 Theses on Art and Class
- Ben Davis (cellist) (fl. 2003–2007), British jazz cellist
- Ben Davis (cinematographer) (born 1961), British cinematographer
- Benjamin Byron Davis (born 1972), American actor
- Ben Davis (singer) (born 1975), American singer and Broadway actor
- Benjamin Lazar Davis (born 1986), American multi-instrumentalist, singer-songwriter
- Benny Davis (1895–1979), vaudeville performer
- Benny Davis, member of the musical comedy trio The Axis of Awesome
- Ben Davis, former drummer of punk band Sugarcult

=== Military ===
- Benjamin Franklin Davis (1832–1863), American Civil War cavalry officer
- Benjamin O. Davis Sr. (1877–1970), first African-American general in the U.S. Army, father of Benjamin O. Davis Jr.
- Benjamin O. Davis Jr. (1912–2002), American general, commander of the World War II Tuskegee Airmen
- Bennie L. Davis (1928–2012), U.S. Air Force general

=== Politics ===
- Ben Davis (Minnesota politician) (born 1977), Minnesota state representative
- Benjamin J. Davis Jr. (1903–1964), New York Communist city councilman and Communist Party USA leader imprisoned for violations of the Smith Act

=== Sports ===
- Ben Davis (American football) (born 1945), American football player
- Ben Davis (Australian footballer) (born 1997), Australian rules footballer
- Ben Davis (basketball) (born 1972), American basketball player
- Ben Davis (baseball) (born 1977), American former catcher and pitcher
- Ben Davis (footballer, born 2000), Thai footballer

=== Other people ===
- Ben Davis (journalist) (born 1974), Australian sports journalist
- Ben G. Davis (born 1970), professor of chemistry at the University of Oxford

== Fictional characters ==
- Ben Davis, a character from Ozark

== Schools ==
- Ben Davis High School, an American high school in Marion County, Indianapolis, Indiana
- Benjamin Davis Elementary School, Alabama
- Benjamin Davis, Jr. High School

== Other uses ==
- Ben Davis (apple), a type of apple
- Ben Davis (clothing), a United States–based work clothing line

== See also ==
- Benjamin Davies (disambiguation)
- Benjamin Davis Jr. (disambiguation)
- List of people with surname Davis
