= Janelle Atkinson =

Jamaican swimmer

Personal information
- Full name: Janelle Anya Monique Atkinson-McClave
- National team: Jamaica
- Born: 30 September 1982 (age 43) Saint Andrew, Surrey, Jamaica
- Height: 5 ft 6 in (1.68 m)
- Weight: 146 lb (66 kg)

Sport
- Sport: Swimming
- Strokes: Freestyle
- Club: Gator Swim Club (USA)
- College team: University of Florida (U.S.)
Medal record
Women's swimming
Representing Jamaica
Pan American Games
Silver medal – second place	1999 Winnipeg	200 m freestyle
Silver medal – second place	1999 Winnipeg	400 m freestyle
Silver medal – second place	1999 Winnipeg	800 m freestyle
Commonwealth Games
Bronze medal – third place	2002 Manchester	400 m freestyle
Bronze medal – third place	2002 Manchester	800 m freestyle

Janelle Anya Monique Atkinson-McClave (born 30 September 1982), née Janelle Anya Monique Atkinson, is a Jamaican former competitive swimmer who won three silver medals at the 1999 Pan American Games. At the 2000 Summer Olympics in Sydney, she became the first Jamaican swimmer to finish in the top four of any swimming event at an Olympic Games, placing fourth in the 400-metre freestyle.

== Early years ==
Atkinson was born in Saint Andrew, Surrey, Jamaica in 1982.

== International career ==
At the 1999 Pan American Games in WinnipegManitoba, Atkinson was a three-time silver medalist, finishing third in each of the 200-, 400- and 800-metre freestyle events. Atkinson represented Jamaica at the 2000 Summer Olympics in Sydney, Australia, where she finished fourth in the 400-metre freestyle and ninth in the 800-metre freestyle. She was the first Jamaican swimmer to finish in the top four at an Olympic Games. Atkinson won a pair of bronze medals in the 400-metre freestyle and 800-metre freestyle at the 2002 Commonwealth Games held in Manchester, England. She also competed in the 200-metre freestyle and 400-metre freestyle for the Jamaican team at the 2004 Summer Olympics in Athens, Greece. Janelle stills holds Jamaican national records in the 200 meter freestyle 2:01.11,400 meter freestyle 4:08.78,800 metre freestyle 8:34.51,1500 metre freestyle 16:22.21 and 200 metre butterfly 2:18.78. She was named Jamaica's Swimmer of the Year seven consecutive times from 1997 to 2003. Her brother, Jevon Atkinson is also an Olympic swimmer. He competed at the 2004 and 2008 Games.Contrary to popular belief, Janelle is not related to Alia Atkinson who coincidentally is also a Jamaican swimmer.

== College career ==
She attended the University of Florida in Gainesville, Florida, where she swam for coach Gregg Troy's Florida Gators swimming and diving team in National Collegiate Athletic Association (NCAA) competition from 2001 to 2004. As a Gator swimmer, Atkinson won three Southeastern Conference (SEC) championships (twice in the 500-yard freestyle and once in the 1,650-yard freestyle), and received ten All-American honors. She graduated from Florida with a bachelor's degree in tourism and hospitality management in 2005.

== Coaching ==
In 2014, Atkinson became the head coach of Swimming and Diving at Fairfield University. Before going to Fairfield, she was an assistant swimming coach for the UConn Huskies women's swimming and diving team at the University of Connecticut in Storrs, Connecticut. For the four years prior to accepting the UConn job, she served as an assistant swimming coach at Wright State University in Dayton, Ohio. She also served as the head coach of the Jamaican women's national team at the 2009 World Aquatics Championships.

In 2017, Atkinson was named the head coach of the Stony Brook University swimming and diving team. She was let go in January 2018 due to allegations of abuse from several swimmers. Atkinson sued Stony Brook, claiming gender bias and that the university "overreacted." The case had an out-of-court settlement of $385,000 and Stony Brook denied any wrongdoing, as part of the agreement.

== See also ==
- List of Commonwealth Games medallists in swimming (women)
- List of Jamaican records in swimming
- List of University of Florida alumni
- List of University of Florida Olympians
