= Chade Nersicio =

Curaçao swimmer (born 2001)

Personal information
- Born: 26 March 2001 (age 25)

Sport
- Sport: Swimming

Chade Nersicio (born 26 March 2001) is a swimmer from Curaçao.

In 2019, she represented Curaçao at the 2019 World Aquatics Championships held in Gwangju, South Korea. She competed in the women's 50 metre freestyle and women's 50 metre butterfly events. In both events she did not advance to compete in the semi-finals.
