= Justin Plaschka =

Jamaican swimmer (born 1996)

Personal information
- Full name: Justin Plaschka
- Nationality: Jamaican
- Born: 12 August 1996 (age 29) Smithtown, New York, United States
- Height: 5 ft 8 in (173 cm)
- Weight: 148 lb (67 kg)

Sport
- Sport: Swimming
- Strokes: Freestyle, Butterfly
- Club: Team Suffolk
- College team: Notre Dame Fighting Irish

Justin Plaschka (born 12 August 1996) is a Jamaican competitive swimmer. He competed in the men's 50 metre butterfly event at the 2017 World Aquatics Championships.

== Early life and education ==
Plaschka was born in Smithtown, New York, and grew up in the Hauppauge area on Long Island. He attended Hauppauge High School, where he was a standout swimmer and set multiple school and NYSPHAA records, he earned multiple All-American honors too. He also competed for the club team Team Suffolk prior to his collegiate career.

== College career ==
Plaschka competed for the men's swimming team at the University of Notre Dame. During his collegiate career, he qualified for the NCAA Championships and set school records in sprint freestyle and butterfly events. At the Atlantic Coast Conference Championships, he earned All-ACC honors and broke the Notre Dame school record in the 100-yard butterfly.

== International career ==
Plaschka represents Jamaica in international competition. He has competed at the FINA World Aquatics Championships and has set Jamaican national records in butterfly events.
