= Keanan Dols =

Jamaican swimmer (born 1998)

Personal information
- Born: 24 July 1998 (age 27) Savanna-la-Mar, Jamaica

Sport
- Sport: Swimming
- Club: Sarasota Sharks
- College team: University of Pennsylvania
- Coach: Gregg Troy; Brent Arckey
Medal record
Men's swimming
Representing Jamaica
Caribbean Islands Swimming Championships
Gold medal – first place	2016 Nassau	100 m backstroke
Gold medal – first place	2016 Nassau	200 m backstroke
Gold medal – first place	2016 Nassau	100 m butterfly
Silver medal – second place	2016 Nassau	200 m individual medley

Keanan Dols (born 24 July 1998) is a Jamaican swimmer. He competed in the men's 200 metre individual medley and men's 200 metre butterfly at the 2020 Summer Olympics.

Born in Jamaica, he grew up in Sarasota, Florida and swam for the University of Pennsylvania, from where he graduated in 2022.
