= List of Gibraltarian records in swimming =

The Gibraltarian records in swimming are the fastest ever performances of swimmers from Gibraltar, which are recognised and ratified by the Gibraltar Amateur Swimming Association (GASA).

All records were set in finals unless noted otherwise.

== Long Course (50 m) ==
=== Men ===
Event	Time		Name	Club	Date	Meet	Location	Ref
50 m freestyle	24.72	h	James Sanderson	Gibraltar	9 April 2018	Commonwealth Games	Gold Coast, Australia	
100 m freestyle	54.02	rh	James Sanderson	Gibraltar	6 April 2018	Commonwealth Games	Gold Coast, Australia	
200 m freestyle	1:59.98	h	Colin Bensadon	Gibraltar	17 March 2006	Commonwealth Games	Melbourne, Australia	
400 m freestyle	4:12.31	h	Colin Bensadon	Gibraltar	26 July 2009	World Championships	Rome, Italy	
800 m freestyle	9:04.57		Colin Bensadon	Gibraltar	11 November 2017	Provinciales	Cádiz, Spain	
1500 m freestyle	17:32.69		Colin Bensadon	Gibraltar	4 August 2002	Commonwealth Games	Manchester, United Kingdom	
50 m backstroke	28.19	h	Jordan Gonzalez	Gibraltar	7 April 2018	Commonwealth Games	Gold Coast, Australia	
100 m backstroke	1:01.38	h	Jordan Gonzalez	Gibraltar	5 April 2018	Commonwealth Games	Gold Coast, Australia	
200 m backstroke	2:18.25	h	Colin Bensadon	Gibraltar	13 May 2006	Provinciales	Cádiz, Spain	
50 m breaststroke	31.62	h	Jamie Zammitt	Gibraltar	19 March 2006	Commonwealth Games	Melbourne, Australia	
100 m breaststroke	1:09.07	h	Jamie Zammitt	Gibraltar	17 March 2006	Commonwealth Games	Melbourne, Australia	
200 m breaststroke	2:35.55	h	Jamie Zammitt	Gibraltar	4 August 2002	Commonwealth Games	Glasgow, Great Britain	
50 m butterfly	25.84	h	Aidan Carroll	Gibraltar	29 July 2022	Commonwealth Games	Birmingham, United Kingdom	
100 m butterfly	57.17	h	Aidan Carroll	Gibraltar	1 August 2022	Commonwealth Games	Birmingham, United Kingdom	
200m butterfly	2:10.50	h	John Paul Balloqui	Gibraltar	31 July 2022	Commonwealth Games	Birmingham, United Kingdom	
200m individual medley	2:13.74	h	Colin Bensadon	Gibraltar	29 July 2014	Commonwealth Games	Glasgow, Great Britain	
400m individual medley	4:47.14		Colin Bensadon	Gibraltar	2 August 2009	World Championships	Rome, Italy	
4×50m freestyle relay	1:45.51		John Paul Balloqui; David Hitchcock; Matt Savitz; Colin Bensadon	Gibraltar	23 April 2017	Provinciales	Cádiz, Spain	
4×100m freestyle relay	3:48.65		Oliver Quick; John Paul Llanelo; Colin Bensadon; James Sanderson	Gibraltar	2 June 2012	Small States of Europe Championships	Andorra, Andorra	
4×200m freestyle relay	8:08.83		Matt Savitz (2:01.67); Jordan Gonzalez (2:04.87); Aidan Carroll (2:01.58); John Paul Balloqui (2:00.71)	Gibraltar	1 August 2022	Commonwealth Games	Birmingham, United Kingdom	
4×50m medley relay	1:56.23		Jordan Gonzalez; John Paul Llanello; Matt Savitz; Colin Bensadon	Gibraltar	10 April 2016	Provinciales	Cádiz, Spain	
4×100m medley relay	4:08.07	h	Jordan Gonzalez (1:02.96); James Sanderson (1:11.29); Aidan Carroll (58.20); Matt Savitz (55.62)	Gibraltar	10 April 2018	Commonwealth Games	Gold Coast, Australia	

Legend: # – Record awaiting ratification by Gibraltar Amateur Swimming Association; WR – World record; ER – European record;
Records not set in finals: h – heat; sf – semifinal; r – relay 1st leg; rh – relay heat 1st leg; b – B final; † – en route to final mark; so – swim-off; tt – time trial

=== Women ===
Event	Time		Name	Club	Date	Meet	Location	Ref
50m freestyle	28.68	h	Christina Linares	Gibraltar	6 April 2018	Commonwealth Games	Gold Coast, Australia	
100m freestyle	1:01.29	h	Christina Linares	Gibraltar	8 April 2018	Commonwealth Games	Gold Coast, Australia	
200m freestyle	2:14.24		Elaine Reyes	Gibraltar	5 July 2005	Provinciales	Cádiz, Spain	
400m freestyle	4:41.60		Asia Kent	Gibraltar	29 July 2023	-	Gibraltar, Gibraltar	
800m freestyle	9:59.88		Rachel Fortunato	-	23 June 2001	-	Millfield, England	
1500m freestyle	19:41.66		Katie Green	Millfield	7 February 2026	Somerset ASA County Championships	Somerset, United Kingdom	
50m backstroke	33.38	h	Rachel Fortunato	Gibraltar	19 March 2006	Commonwealth Games	Melbourne, Australia	
100m backstroke	1:11.85	h	Rachel Fortunato	Gibraltar	17 March 2006	Commonwealth Games	Melbourne, Australia	
200m backstroke	2:36.03		Rachel Fortunato	-	2 July 2005	Provinciales	Cádiz, Spain	
50m breaststroke	32.70	†	Asia Kent	Mount Kelly	20 April 2025	Aquatics GB Championships	London, United Kingdom	
100m breaststroke	1:11.60		Asia Kent	Mount Kelly	22 July 2024	Speedo Aquatics GB Summer Championships	Sheffield, United Kingdom	
100m breaststroke	1:10.94		Asia Kent	Mount Kelly	20 April 2025	Aquatics GB Championships	London, United Kingdom	
200m breaststroke	2:35.78		Asia Kent	Mount Kelly	26 July 2024	Speedo Aquatics GB Summer Championships	Sheffield, United Kingdom	
50m butterfly	31.27	h	Christina Linares	Gibraltar	7 September 2015	Commonwealth Youth Games	Apia, Samoa	
100m butterfly	1:09.10		Kyrene Cumbo	Gibraltar	10 June 2010	Provinciales	San Fernando, Spain	
200m butterfly	2:36.19		Kyrene Cumbo	-	5 August 2000	-	Coventry, United Kingdom	
200m individual medley	2:36.19		Elaine Reyes	-	14 April 2002	-	Sheffield, United Kingdom	
400m individual medley	5:31.39		Katie Green	Millfield	8 February 2026	Somerset ASA County Championships	Somerset, United Kingdom	
4×50m freestyle relay	1:58.78		Elaine Reyes; Rachel Jackson; Maxine Pardo; Rachel Fortunato	Gibraltar	3 July 2005	Provinciales	Cádiz, Spain	
4×100m freestyle relay	4:22.96		Elaine Reyes; Rachel Jackson; Maxine Pardo; Rachel Fortunato	Gibraltar	2 July 2005	Provinciales	Cádiz, Spain	
4×200 m Freestyle relay	9:43.05		Elaine Reyes; Rachel Jackson; Maxine Pardo; Rachel Fortunato	Gibraltar	2 July 2005	Provinciales	Cádiz, Spain	
4×50m medley relay	2:13.71		Rachel Fortunato; Asha Kylie Andrew; Elaine Reyes; Maxine Pardo	Gibraltar	2 July 2005	Provinciales	Cádiz, Spain	
4×100m medley relay	4:56.46		Rachel Fortunato; Asha Kylie Andrew; Elaine Reyes; Maxine Pardo	Gibraltar	3 July 2005	Provinciales	Cádiz, Spain	

Legend: # – Record awaiting ratification by Gibraltar Amateur Swimming Association; WR – World record; ER – European record;
Records not set in finals: h – heat; sf – semifinal; r – relay 1st leg; rh – relay heat 1st leg; b – B final; † – en route to final mark; so – swim-off; tt – time trial

== Short Course (25 m) ==
=== Men ===
Event	Time		Name	Club	Date	Meet	Location	Ref
50 m freestyle	23.44	h	James Sanderson	Gibraltar	28 October 2018	British Championships	Sheffield, United Kingdom	
100 m freestyle	52.17	h	James Sanderson	Gibraltar	28 June 2017	Island Games	Visby, Sweden	
200 m freestyle	1:54.02	h	Matt Savitz	Gibraltar	17 December 2022	World Championships	Melbourne, Australia	
400 m freestyle	4:04.78		Colin Bensadon	Gibraltar	2 July 2009	Island Games	Åland, Sweden	
800 m freestyle	8:43.85		Colin Bensadon	-	17 November 2007	BUCSA Championships	Sheffield, United Kingdom	
1500 m freestyle	16:53.08		Colin Bensadon	Gibraltar	16 November 2002	Provinciales	Algeciras, Spain	
50m backstroke	26.52		Jordan Gonzalez	Gibraltar	8 July 2019	Island Games	Gibraltar, Gibraltar	
100m backstroke	56.68		Jordan Gonzalez	Gibraltar	11 July 2019	Island Games	Gibraltar, Gibraltar	
200m backstroke	2:11.84		Colin Bensadon	Gibraltar	4 April 2009	Provinciales	Los Barrios, Spain	
50m breaststroke	30.86		Colin Bensadon	Gibraltar	15 July 2013	Island Games	Bermuda, Bermuda	
100m breaststroke	1:05.58		Colin Bensadon	Gibraltar	15 July 2013	Island Games	Bermuda, Bermuda	
200m breaststroke	2:22.12		Colin Bensadon	Gibraltar	18 July 2013	Island Games	Bermuda, Bermuda	
50m butterfly	25.72		James Sanderson	-	28 October 2017	-	Sheffield, United Kingdom	
100m butterfly	56.02	h	Aidan Carroll	Gibraltar	17 December 2022	World Championships	Melbourne, Australia	
200m butterfly	2:08.07	h	John Balloqui	Gibraltar	12 December 2021	World Championships	Abu Dhabi, United Arab Emirates	
100m individual medley	59.94	h	James Sanderson	-	27 October 2017	-	Sheffield, United Kingdom	
200m individual medley	2:07.88	h	Colin Bensadon	Gibraltar	14 December 2012	World Championships	Istanbul, Turkey	
400m individual medley	4:30.97		Colin Bensadon	Gibraltar	16 July 2013	Island Games	Bermuda, Bermuda	
4×50m freestyle relay	1:36.81		Elijah Cruz; Jordan Gonzalez; David Hitchcock; James Sanderson	Gibraltar	9 July 2019	Island Games	Gibraltar, Gibraltar	
4×100m freestyle relay	3:28.52		Colin Bensadon; Elijah Cruz; Jordan Gonzalez; James Sanderson	Gibraltar	11 July 2019	Island Games	Gibraltar, Gibraltar	
4×200m freestyle relay	7:49.06	h	David Hitchcock (1:58.84); Colin Bensadon (1:55.61); Jim Sanderson (1:57.01); Matt Savitz (1:57.60)	Gibraltar	9 December 2016	World Championships	Windsor, Canada	
4×50m medley relay	1:45.63		Colin Bensadon; Aidan Carroll; Jordan Gonzalez; James Sanderson	Gibraltar	8 July 2019	Island Games	Gibraltar, Gibraltar	
4×100m medley relay	3:54.10		Jordan Gonzalez; Colin Bensadon; John Paul Balloqui; James Sanderson	Gibraltar	10 July 2019	Island Games	Gibraltar	

Legend: # – Record awaiting ratification by Gibraltar Amateur Swimming Association; WR – World record; ER – European record;
Records not set in finals: h – heat; sf – semifinal; r – relay 1st leg; rh – relay heat 1st leg; b – B final; † – en route to final mark; so – swim-off; tt – time trial

=== Women ===
Event	Time		Name	Club	Date	Meet	Location	Ref
50 m freestyle	27.95	h	Christina Linares	Gibraltar	11 December 2016	World Championships	Windsor, Canada	
100 m freestyle	58.90		Elaine Reyes	Gibraltar	14 July 2005	Island Games	Shetland, United Kingdom	
200 m freestyle	2:06.11		Elaine Reyes	Gibraltar	11 July 2005	Island Games	Shetland, United Kingdom	
400 m freestyle	4:38.31		Elaine Reyes	Gibraltar	2 July 2003	Island Games	Guernsey, Guernsey	
800 m freestyle	9:42.97		Rachel Fortunato	Gibraltar	29 June 1999	Island Games	Gotland, Sweden	
1500 m freestyle	18:31.36		Elaine Reyes	Gibraltar	30 May 2005	-	Gibraltar, Gibraltar	
50 m backstroke	31.71	h	Rachel Fortunato	Gibraltar	14 July 2005	Island Games	Shetland, United Kingdom	
100 m backstroke	1:08.37	h	Rachel Fortunato	Gibraltar	14 July 2005	Island Games	Shetland, United Kingdom	
200 m backstroke	2:28.53		Rachel Fortunato	Gibraltar	2 July 2003	Island Games	Guernsey, Guernsey	
50 m breaststroke	32.52		Asia Kent	Gibraltar	14 July 2025	Island Games	Orkney, Great Britain	
100 m breaststroke	1:08.91		Asia Kent	-	5 December 2024	GoCardless SE National Winter Championships	Sheffield, United Kingdom	
200 m breaststroke	2:32.74		Asia Kent	-	5 October 2024	PNSC First Chance - Level 2	Portsmouth, United Kingdom	
50 m butterfly	30.64	h	Christina Linares	Gibraltar	30 June 2015	Island Games	Jersey, Jersey	
100 m butterfly	1:06.26		Asia Kent	Gibraltar	14 July 2025	Island Games	Orkney, Great Britain	
200 m butterfly	2:27.77		Kyrene Cumbo	Gibraltar	1 July 1999	Island Games	Gotland, Sweden	
100 m individual medley	1:06.46		Asia Kent	Gibraltar	17 July 2025	Island Games	Orkney, Great Britain	
200 m individual medley	2:24.56		Asia Kent	Gibraltar	15 July 2025	Island Games	Orkney, Great Britain	
400 m individual medley	5:20.38		Kyrene Cumbo	Gibraltar	24 April 1999	Provinciales	Algeciras, Spain	
4×50 m freestyle relay	1:57.12		Elaine Reyes; Asha Kylie Andrew; Rachel Jackson; Rachel Fortunato	Gibraltar	11 July 2005	Island Games	Shetland, United Kingdom	
4×100 m freestyle relay	4:15.54		Rachel Fortunato; Elaine Reyes; Arianne Falero; Rebecca Fortunato	Gibraltar	30 June 1999	Island Games	Gotland, Sweden	
4×200 m freestyle relay	9:26.70		Elaine Reyes; Arianne Sanguinetti; Rachel Fortunato; Kyrene Cumbo	Gibraltar	8 January 2000	Provinciales	Algeciras, Spain	
4×50 m medley relay	2:10.39		Rachel Fortunato; Arianne Sanguinetti; Kyrene Cumbo; Rebecca Fortunato	Gibraltar	28 June 1999	Island Games	Gotland, Sweden	
4×100 m medley relay	4:43.47		Rachel Fortunato; Asha Kylie Andrew; Elaine Reyes; Maxine Pardo	Gibraltar	14 July 2005	Island Games	Shetland, United Kingdom	

Legend: # – Record awaiting ratification by Gibraltar Amateur Swimming Association; WR – World record; ER – European record;
Records not set in finals: h – heat; sf – semifinal; r – relay 1st leg; rh – relay heat 1st leg; b – B final; † – en route to final mark; so – swim-off; tt – time trial

=== Mixed relay ===
Event	Time	Name	Club	Date	Meet	Location	Ref
4×50 m freestyle relay	1:45.92	David Hitchcock; Christina Linares; Rachel Sanders; Matt Savitz	Gibraltar	11 July 2019	Island Games	Gibraltar	
4×100 m freestyle relay	4:25.03	Christian Chang-Chipolina; Anya Randall; Arianne Mena; Kayden Galliano	Gibraltar	30 November 2024	Provinciales	Los Barrios, Spain	
4×50 m medley relay	2:05.20	Katie Maddocks; José Alves Monteiro; Christian Chang-Chipolina; Arianne Mena	Gibraltar	28 March 2026	VI Trofeo	Los Barrios, Spain	
4×100 m medley relay	4:49.62	Katie Maddocks; José Alves Monteiro; Adam Burns; Charlotte Peat	Gibraltar	1 December 2024	Provinciales	Los Barrios, Spain	

Legend: # – Record awaiting ratification by Gibraltar Amateur Swimming Association; WR – World record; ER – European record;
Records not set in finals: h – heat; so – swim-off
