= Cayman Islands at the 2015 World Aquatics Championships =

2015 World Aquatics Championships

- Flag of the Cayman Islands
- World Aquatics code: CAY
- National federation: Cayman Islands Amateur Swimming Association
- Website: www.ciasa.ky

in Kazan, Russia
- Competitors: 3 in 1 sport
- Medals: Gold 0 Silver 0 Bronze 0 Total 0

World Aquatics Championships appearances
- 2003; 2005; 2007; 2009; 2011; 2013; 2015; 2017; 2019; 2022; 2023; 2024; 2025

Cayman Islands competed at the 2015 World Aquatics Championships in Kazan, Russia from 24 July to 9 August 2015.

== Swimming ==
Caymanian swimmers have achieved qualifying standards in the following events (up to a maximum of 2 swimmers in each event at the A-standard entry time, and 1 at the B-standard):

Men

Athlete	Event	Heat		Final	
Athlete	Event	Time	Rank	Time	Rank
Geoffrey Butler	400 m freestyle	4:07.41	63	did not advance	
Geoffrey Butler	1500 m freestyle	16:21.18	44	did not advance	

Women

Athlete	Event	Heat		Semifinal		Final	
Athlete	Event	Time	Rank	Time	Rank	Time	Rank
Lara Butler	100 m backstroke	1:06.71	54	did not advance			
Lara Butler	100 m butterfly	1:06.10	58	did not advance			
Lauren Hew	50 m backstroke	32.33	44	did not advance			
Lauren Hew	200 m backstroke	2:29.52	43	did not advance			
