= Cayman Islands at the 2023 World Aquatics Championships =

- Flag of the Cayman Islands
- World Aquatics code: CAY
- National federation: Cayman Islands Aquatic Sports Association
- Website: ciasa.ky

in Fukuoka, Japan
- Competitors: 3 in 1 sport
- Medals: Gold 0 Silver 0 Bronze 0 Total 0

World Aquatics Championships appearances
- 2003; 2005; 2007; 2009; 2011; 2013; 2015; 2017; 2019; 2022; 2023; 2024; 2025

Cayman Islands is set to compete at the 2023 World Aquatics Championships in Fukuoka, Japan from 14 to 30 July.

== Swimming ==
Cayman Islands entered 3 swimmers.

Men

Athlete	Event	Heat		Semifinal		Final	
Athlete	Event	Time	Rank	Time	Rank	Time	Rank
Jordan Crooks	50 metre freestyle	21.90 NR	7 Q	21.73 NR	5 Q	21.73	6
Jordan Crooks	100 metre freestyle	47.77 NR	4 Q	47.71 NR	6 Q	47.94	7

Women

Athlete	Event	Heat		Semifinal		Final	
Athlete	Event	Time	Rank	Time	Rank	Time	Rank
Harper Barrowman	200 metre freestyle	2:06.49	47	Did not advance			
Harper Barrowman	400 metre freestyle	4:26.88	36	—		Did not advance	
Jillian Crooks	50 metre freestyle	25.66 NR	32	Did not advance			
Jillian Crooks	100 metre freestyle	55.32 NR	23	Did not advance			
