= Cayman Islands at the 2025 World Aquatics Championships =

- Flag of Cayman Islands
- World Aquatics code: CAY
- National federation: Cayman Islands Aquatic Sports Association
- Website: ciasa.ky

in Singapore
- Competitors: 2 in 1 sport
- Medals: Gold 0 Silver 0 Bronze 0 Total 0

World Aquatics Championships appearances
- 2003; 2005; 2007; 2009; 2011; 2013; 2015; 2017; 2019; 2022; 2023; 2024; 2025

Cayman Islands is competing at the 2025 World Aquatics Championships in Singapore from 11 July to 3 August 2025.

== Competitors ==
The following is the list of competitors in the Championships.

Sport	Men	Women	Total
Swimming	0	2	2
Total	0	2	2

== Swimming ==
Women

Athlete	Event	Heat		Semifinal		Final	
Athlete	Event	Time	Rank	Time	Rank	Time	Rank
Harper Barrowman	200 m freestyle	2:08.28	40	Did not advance			
Harper Barrowman	800 m freestyle	9:21.03	30	—N/a		Did not advance	
Kyra Stephanie Rabess	400 m freestyle	4:23.08 NR	28	—N/a		Did not advance	
Kyra Stephanie Rabess	1500 m freestyle	17:15.71	27	—N/a		Did not advance	
