= Cayman Islands at the 2022 World Aquatics Championships =

- Flag of the Cayman Islands
- World Aquatics code: CAY
- National federation: Cayman Islands Amateur Swimming Association

in Budapest, Hungary
- Competitors: 2 in 1 sport
- Medals: Gold 0 Silver 0 Bronze 0 Total 0

World Aquatics Championships appearances
- 2003; 2005; 2007; 2009; 2011; 2013; 2015; 2017; 2019; 2022; 2023; 2024; 2025

Cayman Islands competed at the 2022 World Aquatics Championships in Budapest, Hungary from 18 June to 3 July.

== Swimming ==
Athlete	Event	Heat		Semifinal		Final	
Athlete	Event	Time	Rank	Time	Rank	Time	Rank
Jordan Crooks	Men's 50 m freestyle	22.20	19	did not advance			
Jordan Crooks	Men's 100 m freestyle	48.79	21	did not advance			
Jillian Crooks	Women's 50 m freestyle	26.75	41	did not advance			
Jillian Crooks	Women's 100 m freestyle	57.24	29	did not advance			
