= List of Cayman Islands records in swimming =

The Cayman Islands Records in Swimming are the fastest times ever swum by a swimmer representing the Cayman Islands. These records are kept by the Cayman Islands Amateur Swimming Association (CIASA).

CIASA keeps records for both for males and females, for long course (50m) and short course (25m) events. Records are kept in the following events (by stroke):

- freestyle: 50, 100, 200, 400, 800 and 1500;
- backstroke: 50, 100 and 200;
- breaststroke: 50, 100 and 200;
- butterfly: 50, 100 and 200;
- individual medley: 100 (25m only), 200 and 400;
- relays: 4x100 free, 4x200 free, and 4 × 100 medley.

== Long course (50m) ==
=== Men ===
Event	Time		Name	Club	Date	Meet	Location	Ref
50 m freestyle	21.51	h	Jordan Crooks	Cayman Islands	1 August 2024	Olympics Games	Paris, France	
100 m freestyle	47.71	sf	Jordan Crooks	Cayman Islands	26 July 2023	World Championships	Fukuoka, Japan	
200 m freestyle	1:46.44	sf	Shaune Fraser	Cayman Islands	27 July 2009	World Championships	Rome, Italy	
400 m freestyle	3:57.51		Shaune Fraser	Gator SC	17 July 2008	USA Sectional meet	Fort Lauderdale, United States	
800 m freestyle	8:29.61		Shaune Fraser	-	12 June 2004	Janet Evans Invitational	Los Angeles, United States	
1500 m freestyle	16:01.66		Geoffrey Butler	University of Edinburgh	12 March 2016	Edinburgh International Meet	Edinburgh, United Kingdom	
50 m backstroke	26.49	h	Jordan Crooks	Tennessee	12 January 2023	TYR Pro Swim Series	Knoxville, United States	
100 m backstroke	56.99		Shaune Fraser	Gator S.C.	November 2011	USA Grand Prix meet	Minneapolis, United States	
200 m backstroke	2:01.17	h	Brett Fraser	Cayman Islands	13 August 2008	Olympic Games	Beijing, China	
50m breaststroke	29.09		David Ebanks	Romford Town	4 February 2017	Essex Age Group Championships	Basildon, Great Britain	
100m breaststroke	1:07.01		Dominic Hilton	Cayman Islands	22 April 2025	CARIFTA Championships	Couva, Trinidad and Tobago	
200m breaststroke	2:21.44		Dominic Hilton	Cayman Islands	19 April 2025	CARIFTA Championships	Couva, Trinidad and Tobago	
50m butterfly	23.66	=	Brett Fraser	Gator S.C.	25 July 2014	Commonwealth Games	Glasgow, Great Britain	
50m butterfly	23.66	=	Brett Fraser	New York Athletic Club	19 January 2020	Geneva International Challenge Meet	Geneva, Switzerland	
100m butterfly	52.96		Brett Fraser	Cayman Islands	16 October 2011	Pan American Games	Guadalajara, Mexico	
200m butterfly	2:01.58		Shaune Fraser	Cayman Islands	July 2005	CCCAN	Santo Domingo, Dominican Republic	
200m individual medley	2:04.51		Shaune Fraser	Cayman Islands	22 July 2006	Central American & Caribbean Games	Cartagena, Colombia	
400m individual medley	4:29.00		Shaune Fraser	Cayman Islands	16 March 2006	Commonwealth Games	Melbourne, Australia	
4×50m freestyle relay	1:39.24		Jordan Crooks; Zachary Moore; Liam Henry; Jake Bailey	Cayman Islands	23 April 2019	CARIFTA Championships	Bridgetown, Barbados	
4×100m freestyle relay	3:26.14		James Allison (49.39); Connor McDonald (52.41); Elijah Bain (53.79); Daniel Kash (50.55)	Cayman Islands	24 July 2026	Commonwealth Games	Glasgow, United Kingdom	
4×200m freestyle relay	7:48.64	h	Connor Macdonald (1:55.80); Elijah Bain (1:57.91); Will Sellars (2:02.94); James Allison (1:51.99)	Cayman Islands	26 July 2026	Commonwealth Games	Glasgow, United Kingdom	
4×100m medley relay	3:59.52		Will Sellars; Jordan Lisle; Danny Kish; James Allison	Cayman Islands	7 April 2023	CARIFTA Championships	Willemstad, Curaçao	

Legend: # – Record awaiting ratification by Cayman Islands Amateur Swimming Association; WR – World record; AM – Americas record; e – equalled existing record;
Records not set in finals: h – heat; sf – semifinal; r – relay 1st leg; rh – relay heat 1st leg; b – B final; † – en route to final mark; so – swim-off; tt – time trial

=== Women ===
Event	Time		Name	Club	Date	Meet	Location	Ref
50m freestyle	25.66	h	Jillian Crooks	Cayman Islands	29 July 2023	World Championships	Fukuoka, Japan	
100m freestyle	55.18		Jillian Crooks	Cayman Islands	7 August 2023	Commonwealth Youth Games	Trinidad, Trinidad and Tobago	
200m freestyle	2:03.67		Jillian Crooks	TS Aquatics	27 July 2022	Futures Championships	Cary, United States	
400m freestyle	4:21.48		Kyra Rabess	Stingray	19 June 2026	TYR Pro Swim Series	Indianapolis, United States	
400m freestyle	4:19.09	h, #	Kyra Rabess	Cayman Islands	24 July 2026	Commonwealth Games	Glasgow, United Kingdom	
800m freestyle	8:58.44		Kyra Rabess	Northern KY	21 March 2024	Speedo Sectionals	Phoenix, United States	
1500m freestyle	17:05.02		Kyra Rabess	Northern KY	17 June 2026	TYR Pro Swim Series	Indianapolis, United States	
50m backstroke	28.91		Lila Higgo	Bolles School Sharks	25 July 2025	Futures Championships	Ocala, United States	
100m backstroke	1:01.91		Jillian Crooks	TAC Titans	21 June 2024	Bahamian Championships	Nassau, Bahamas	
200m backstroke	2:19.38	=	Lila Higgo	Camana Bay Aquatic Club	31 July 2022	Futures Championships	Cary, United States	
200m backstroke	2:19.38	c, =, not ratified	Lila Higgo	Bolles School Sharks	3 March 2023	TYR Pro Swim Series	Fort Lauderdale, United States	
50m breaststroke	32.98		Lila Higgo	Cayman Islands	8 April 2023	CARIFTA Championships	Willemstad, Curaçao	
100m breaststroke	1:13.11	tt	Lila Higgo	Bolles School Sharks	5 November 2023	FL FAST High School Time Trial - Week 1	Ocala, United States	
200m breaststroke	2:45.65		Sabine Ellison	Cayman Islands	31 March 2018	CARIFTA Championships	Kingston, Jamaica	
50m butterfly	27.53	b	Jillian Crooks	Tac Titans	19 May 2023	TYR Pro Swim Series	Mission Viejo, United States	
100m butterfly	1:00.22		Jillian Crooks	Cayman Islands	2 April 2024	CARIFTA Championships	Nassau, Bahamas	
200m butterfly	2:16.79		Sierrah Broadbelt	Mt Kelly	23 July 2024	British Summer Championships	Sheffield, United Kingdom	
200m individual medley	2:20.85 (Note: by official result and CIASA sources 2:20.48 or 2:20.38 by other sources, probably a typo)		Lila Higgo	Bolles School Sharks	19 May 2024	Canadian Trials	Toronto, Canada	
400m individual medley	5:06.77		Heather Roffey	Cayman Islands	10 August 2003	Pan American Games	Santo Domingo, Dominican Republic	
4×50m freestyle relay	1:48.62		Jillian Crooks; Lila Higgo; Harper Barrowman; Sofia Bonati	Cayman Islands	9 April 2023	CARIFTA Championships	Willemstad, Curaçao	
4×100m freestyle relay	3:56.61		Kyra Rabess (57.87); Sierrah Broadbelt (58.55); Harper Barrowman (59.10); Riley Watson (1:01.09)	Cayman Islands	24 July 2026	Commonwealth Games	Glasgow, United Kingdom	
4×200m freestyle relay	8:39.08		Harper Barrowman (2:09.99); Kyra Rabess (2:04.96); Riley Watson (2:15.94); Lila Higgo (2:08.19)	Cayman Islands	13 August 2025	Junior Pan American Games	Asunción, Paraguay	
4×100m medley relay	4:31.60		Lila Higgo (1:07.12); Kaitlyn Sullivan (1:19.14); Jilian Crooks (1:05.16); Harper Barrowman (1:00.18)	Cayman Islands	7 April 2023	CARIFTA Championships	Willemstad, Curaçao	

Legend: # – Record awaiting ratification by Cayman Islands Amateur Swimming Association; WR – World record; AM – Americas record; e – equalled existing record;
Records not set in finals: h – heat; sf – semifinal; r – relay 1st leg; rh – relay heat 1st leg; b – B final; † – en route to final mark; so – swim-off; tt – time trial

=== Mixed relay ===
Event	Time		Name	Club	Date	Meet	Location	Ref
4×100 m freestyle relay	3:36.18		James Allison (49.56); Danny Kish (51.49); Kyra Rabess (57.00); Sierrah Broadbelt (58.13)	Cayman Islands	25 July 2026	Commonwealth Games	Glasgow, United Kingdom	
4×200 m freestyle relay	8:18.63		James Allison (1:52.39); Connor Macdonald; Harper Barrowman; Sierrah Broadbelt	Cayman Islands	8 August 2023	Commonwealth Youth Games	Trinidad, Trinidad and Tobago	
4×100 m medley relay	4:09.43	h	Sierrah Broadbelt (1:05.63); Will Sellars (1:10.75); Danny Kish (54.83); Kyra Rabess (58.22)	Cayman Islands	28 July 2026	Commonwealth Games	Glasgow, United Kingdom	

Legend: # – Record awaiting ratification by Cayman Islands Amateur Swimming Association; WR – World record; AM – Americas record; e – equalled existing record;
Records not set in finals: h – heat; so – swim-off

== Short course (25m) ==
=== Men ===
Event	Time		Name	Club	Date	Meet	Location	Ref
50m freestyle	19.90	sf, WR	Jordan Crooks	Cayman Islands	14 December 2024	World Championships	Budapest, Hungary	
100m freestyle	44.95	h	Jordan Crooks	Cayman Islands	11 December 2024	World Championships	Budapest, Hungary	
200m freestyle	1:42.98	h	Shaune Fraser	Cayman Islands	15 December 2010	Short Course Worlds	Dubai, United Arab Emirates	
400m freestyle	3:54.93		James Allison	Seven Mile Swimmers	21 February 2023	CIASA Championships	Grand Cayman, Cayman Islands	
800m freestyle	8:18.27		Will Sellars	SurreyUni SC	7 December 2024	Swim England National Winter Championships	Sheffield, Great Britain	
1500m freestyle	15:46.87		Geoffrey Butler	Cayman Islands	15 July 2013	Island Games	Devonshire Parish, Bermuda	
50m backstroke	25.23		Jordan Crooks	Camana Bay	27 February 2020	CIASA Championships	Grand Cayman, Cayman Islands	
50m backstroke	22.60	#	Jordan Crooks	Tennessee Volunteers	16 October 2026	UVA Pro Elite SCM Worlds Prep Meet	Charlottesville, United States	
100m backstroke	55.53		Jordan Crooks	Unattached	19 February 2021	CIASA Championships	Grand Cayman, Cayman Islands	
200m backstroke	2:00.17	h	Brett Fraser	Cayman Islands	13 April 2008	Short Course Worlds	Manchester, Great Britain	
50m breaststroke	28.89		David Ebanks	Romford Town	23 October 2015	ASA National Masters Championships	Sheffield, United Kingdom	
100m breaststroke	1:04.05		David Ebanks	Romford Town	25 October 2014	ASA Masters Meet	Sheffield, United Kingdom	
200m breaststroke	2:18.10	h	Dominic Hilton	University of Toronto	13 March 2026	U SPORTS Championships	Markham, Canada	
50m butterfly	22.95	h	Brett Fraser	Cayman Islands	5 December 2014	World Championships	Doha, Qatar	
50m butterfly	22.07	#	Jordan Crooks	Cayman Islands	15 October 2026	UVA Pro Elite SCM Worlds Prep Meet	Charlottesville, United States	
100m butterfly	51.06 (Note: by official result source; 51.60 by CIASA source, a typo)		Shaune Fraser	Cayman Islands	16 July 2013	Island Games	Devonshire Parish, Bermuda	
200m butterfly	1:53.80	h	Shaune Fraser	Cayman Islands	19 December 2010	Short Course Worlds	Dubai, United Arab Emirates	
100m individual medley	52.94	h	Shaune Fraser	Cayman Islands	18 December 2010	Short Course Worlds	Dubai, United Arab Emirates	
200m individual medley	1:56.21	h	Shaune Fraser	Cayman Islands	17 December 2010	Short Course Worlds	Dubai, United Arab Emirates	
400m individual medley	4:24.42		Dominic Hilton	University of Toronto	12 March 2026	U SPORTS Championships	Markham, Canada	
4×50m freestyle relay	1:33.92		Iev Fahy (24.63); Will Sellars (23.64); Daniel Kish (23.37); James Allison (22.28)	Cayman Islands	15 July 2025	Island Games	Orkney, Great Britain	
4×100m freestyle relay	3:21.55		James Allison (48.78); Will Sellars (51.93); Iev Fahy (51.61); Daniel Kish (49.23)	Cayman Islands	17 July 2025	Island Games	Orkney, Great Britain	
4×200m freestyle relay								
4×50m medley relay	1:43.08		Will Sellars (26.32); Jack Clark-Terrell (29.95); Daniel Kish (24.63); James Allison (22.18)	Cayman Islands	14 July 2025	Island Games	Orkney, Great Britain	
4×100m medley relay	3:45.16		Will Sellars (56.50); Jack Clark-Terrell (1:06.56); Daniel Kish (54.20); James Allison (47.90)	Cayman Islands	16 July 2025	Island Games	Orkney, Great Britain	

Legend: # – Record awaiting ratification by Cayman Islands Amateur Swimming Association; WR – World record; AM – Americas record; e – equalled existing record;
Records not set in finals: h – heat; sf – semifinal; r – relay 1st leg; rh – relay heat 1st leg; b – B final; † – en route to final mark; so – swim-off; tt – time trial

=== Women ===
Event	Time		Name	Club	Date	Meet	Location	Ref
50m freestyle	24.70	h	Jillian Crooks	Cayman Islands	14 December 2024	World Championships	Budapest, Hungary	
100m freestyle	54.13	h	Jillian Crooks	Cayman Islands	11 December 2024	World Championships	Budapest, Hungary	
200m freestyle	2:00.16	h	Jillian Crooks	Cayman Islands	4 November 2022	World Cup	Indianapolis, United States	
400m freestyle	4:14.77	h	Kyra Rabess	Cayman Islands	10 December 2024	World Championships	Budapest, Hungary	
800m freestyle	8:46.13		Kyra Rabess	Cayman Islands	11 December 2024	World Championships	Budapest, Hungary	
1500m freestyle	17:01.45		Kyra Rabess	Cayman Islands	11 July 2023	Island Games	Guernsey, United Kingdom	
50m backstroke	27.48		Jillian Crooks	Camana Bay Aquatic Club	18 February 2023	CIASA Championships	Grand Cayman, Cayman Islands	
100m backstroke	1:01.54		Sierrah Broadbelt	Mt Kelly	6 December 2024	Swim England National Winter Championships	Sheffield, United Kingdom	
200m backstroke	2:12.58		Jillian Crooks	Camana Bay Aquatic Club	21 February 2023	CIASA Championships	Grand Cayman, Cayman Islands	
50m breaststroke	34.25		Sarah Jackson	Stingray	8 December 2017	Coconut Cup	Visby, Cayman Islands	
100m breaststroke	1:15.33		Ella Plunkett	Stingray	8 December 2017	Coconut Cup	Grand Cayman, Cayman Islands	
200m breaststroke	2:41.52		Sabine Ellison	University Of Ottawa	8 October 2021	Coupe Universitaire 1- UdeM	Montreal, Canada	
50m butterfly	26.40	h	Jillian Crooks	Cayman Islands	13 December 2022	World Championships	Melbourne, Australia	
100m butterfly	1:00.05		Jillian Crooks	Camana Bay Aquatic Club	18 February 2023	CIASA Championships	Grand Cayman, Cayman Islands	
200m butterfly	2:14.27	b	Sierrah Broadbelt	Mt Kelly	6 December 2024	Swim England National Winter Championships	Sheffield, Great Britain	
100m individual medley	1:04.66	h	Sierrah Broadbelt	Mt Kelly	7 December 2024	Swim England National Winter Championships	Sheffield, Great Britain	
200m individual medley	2:18.24		Lara Butler	Stingray	15 November 2015	BUCS Championships	Sheffield, United Kingdom	
400m individual medley	4:56.29		Lara Butler	Cayman Islands	15 July 2013	Island Games	Devonshire Parish, Bermuda	
4×50m freestyle relay	1:47.07		Veronika Fankina; Alison Jackson; Sarah Jackson; Kyra Rabess	Cayman Islands	10 July 2023	Island Games	Guernsey, United Kingdom	
4×100m freestyle relay	3:52.14		Jillian Crooks; Alison Jackson; Avery Lambert; Kyra Rabess	Cayman Islands	10 July 2019	Island Games	Gibraltar	
4×200m freestyle relay								
4×50m medley relay	2:01.12		Samantha Bailey; Jillian Crooks; Alison Jackson; Kyra Rabess	Cayman Islands	9 July 2019	Island Games	Gibraltar	
4×100m medley relay	4:33.21		Samantha Bailey; Jillian Crooks; Raya Embury-Brown; Avery Lambert	Cayman Islands	11 July 2019	Island Games	Gibraltar	

Legend: # – Record awaiting ratification by Cayman Islands Amateur Swimming Association; WR – World record; AM – Americas record; e – equalled existing record;
Records not set in finals: h – heat; sf – semifinal; r – relay 1st leg; rh – relay heat 1st leg; b – B final; † – en route to final mark; so – swim-off; tt – time trial

=== Mixed relay ===
Event	Time	Name	Club	Date	Meet	Location	Ref
4×50 m freestyle relay	1:37.67	Daniel Kish (23.32); James Allison (21.90); Eva Oldfield (26.34); Sierrah Broadbelt (25.81)	Cayman Islands	17 July 2025	Island Games	Orkney, Great Britain	
4×50 m medley relay	1:51.02	Sierrah Broadbelt (28.76); Jack Clark-Terrell (29.91); Eva Oldfield (29.52); James Allison (22.83)	Cayman Islands	14 July 2025	Island Games	Orkney, Great Britain	

Legend: # – Record awaiting ratification by Cayman Islands Amateur Swimming Association; WR – World record; AM – Americas record; e – equalled existing record;
Records not set in finals: h – heat; so – swim-off
