= Cayman Islands at the 2019 World Aquatics Championships =

Cayman Islands at the 2017 World Aquatics Championships
- Flag of the Cayman Islands
- World Aquatics code: CAY
- National federation: Cayman Islands Amateur Swimming Association
- Website: www.ciasa.ky

in Gwangju, South Korea
- Competitors: 4 in 1 sport
- Medals: Gold 0 Silver 0 Bronze 0 Total 0

World Aquatics Championships appearances
- 2003; 2005; 2007; 2009; 2011; 2013; 2015; 2017; 2019; 2022; 2023; 2024; 2025

Cayman Islands competed at the 2019 World Aquatics Championships in Gwangju, South Korea from 12 to 28 July.

== Swimming ==
Cayman Islands entered four swimmers.

Men

Athlete	Event	Heat		Semifinal		Final	
Athlete	Event	Time	Rank	Time	Rank	Time	Rank
Jordan Crooks	100 m freestyle	52.36	78	did not advance			
Jordan Crooks	200 m freestyle	1:56.33	59	did not advance			
Brett Fraser	50 m freestyle	23.12	55	did not advance			

Women

Athlete	Event	Heat		Semifinal		Final	
Athlete	Event	Time	Rank	Time	Rank	Time	Rank
Raya Embury-Brown	400 m freestyle	4:38.17	41	—N/a		did not advance	
Raya Embury-Brown	800 m freestyle	9:22.69	39	—N/a		did not advance	
Lauren Hew	50 m freestyle	27.26	51	did not advance			
Lauren Hew	100 m freestyle	59.57	56	did not advance			

Mixed

Athlete	Event	Heat		Final	
Athlete	Event	Time	Rank	Time	Rank
Brett Fraser; Jordan Crooks; Raya Embury-Brown; Lauren Hew	4 × 100 m freestyle relay	3:44.54	24	did not advance	
