= Cayman Islands at the 2017 World Aquatics Championships =

- Flag of the Cayman Islands
- World Aquatics code: CAY
- National federation: Cayman Islands Amateur Swimming Association
- Website: www.ciasa.ky

in Budapest, Hungary
- Competitors: 1 in 1 sport
- Medals: Gold 0 Silver 0 Bronze 0 Total 0

World Aquatics Championships appearances
- 2003; 2005; 2007; 2009; 2011; 2013; 2015; 2017; 2019; 2022; 2023; 2024; 2025

The Cayman Islands competed at the 2017 World Aquatics Championships in Budapest, Hungary from 14 July to 30 July.

== Swimming ==
Cayman Islands has received a Universality invitation from FINA to send a female swimmer to the World Championships.

Athlete	Event	Heat		Semifinal		Final	
Athlete	Event	Time	Rank	Time	Rank	Time	Rank
Lauren Hew	Women's 200 m freestyle	2:08.91	40	did not advance			
Lauren Hew	Women's 100 m backstroke	1:08.38	50	did not advance			
