= Alexander McCallum =

Alexander McCallum may refer to:

- Alick McCallum (1877–1937), Western Australian politician
- Alexander McCallum (minister) (1866–1935), president-general of the Methodist Church of Australasia 1920–1923
- Alexander McCallum (swimmer), swimmer from the Cayman Islands, won silver and bronze Swimming at the 2015 Island Games
