= Geoffrey Butler =

Geoffrey Butler may refer to:

- Geoffrey Butler (swimmer) (born 1995), freestyle swimmer from the Cayman Islands
- Sir Geoffrey G. Butler, British historian and politician
- Geoffrey Butler (The Fresh Prince of Bel-Air), a character on the TV series The Fresh Prince of Bel-Air
