= Cayman Islands at the 2024 World Aquatics Championships =

- Flag of the Cayman Islands
- FINA code: CAY
- National federation: Cayman Islands Aquatic Sports Association
- Website: ciasa.ky

in Doha, Qatar
- Competitors: 3 in 1 sport
- Medals: Gold 0 Silver 0 Bronze 0 Total 0

World Aquatics Championships appearances
- 2003; 2005; 2007; 2009; 2011; 2013; 2015; 2017; 2019; 2022; 2023; 2024

Cayman Islands competed at the 2024 World Aquatics Championships in Doha, Qatar from 2 to 18 February.

== Competitors ==
The following is the list of competitors in the Championships.

Sport	Men	Women	Total
Swimming	1	2	3
Total	1	2	3

== Swimming ==
Cayman Islands entered 3 swimmers.

Men

Athlete	Event	Heat		Semifinal		Final	
Athlete	Event	Time	Rank	Time	Rank	Time	Rank
James Allison	100 metre freestyle	51.75	54	Did not advance			
James Allison	200 metre freestyle	1:56.18	55	Did not advance			

Women

Athlete	Event	Heat		Semifinal		Final	
Athlete	Event	Time	Rank	Time	Rank	Time	Rank
Harper Barrowman	200 metre freestyle	2:06.36	37	Did not advance			
Harper Barrowman	400 metre freestyle	4:27.30	28	—		Did not advance	
Jillian Crooks	50 metre freestyle	25.79	32	Did not advance			
Jillian Crooks	100 metre freestyle	55.61	20	Did not advance			
Jillian Crooks	100 metre backstroke	1:02.19	22	Did not advance			
