= Charlotte Atkinson (swimmer) =

British swimmer

Personal information
- Full name: Charlotte Bridey Atkinson
- Nationality: Great Britain
- Born: 29 November 1996 (age 29) Douglas, Isle of Man

Sport
- Sport: Swimming
- Strokes: Butterfly
Medal record
Representing Great Britain
European Championships (LC)
Gold medal – first place	2018 Glasgow	4×100 m mixed medley
Youth Olympic Games
Silver medal – second place	2014 Nanjing	4×100 m medley
Representing Isle of Man
Island Games
Gold medal – first place	2011 Isle of Wight	200 m backstroke
Gold medal – first place	2011 Isle of Wight	400 m medley
Gold medal – first place	2013 Bermuda	50 m backstroke
Gold medal – first place	2013 Bermuda	50 m butterfly
Gold medal – first place	2015 Jersey	50 m freestyle
Gold medal – first place	2015 Jersey	100 m freestyle
Gold medal – first place	2015 Jersey	50 m butterfly
Gold medal – first place	2015 Jersey	100 m butterfly
Gold medal – first place	2015 Jersey	200 m butterfly
Gold medal – first place	2015 Jersey	200 m medley
Gold medal – first place	2015 Jersey	4×50 m freestyle
Gold medal – first place	2015 Jersey	4×100 m medley
Silver medal – second place	2011 Isle of Wight	800 m freestyle
Silver medal – second place	2011 Isle of Wight	200 m butterfly
Silver medal – second place	2013 Bermuda	400 m freestyle
Silver medal – second place	2013 Bermuda	100 m butterfly
Silver medal – second place	2013 Bermuda	200 m butterfly
Silver medal – second place	2013 Bermuda	4×50 m medley
Silver medal – second place	2015 Jersey	4×100 m freestyle
Silver medal – second place	2015 Jersey	4×50 m medley
Bronze medal – third place	2011 Isle of Wight	200 m medley
Bronze medal – third place	2013 Bermuda	4×100 m medley

Charlotte Bridey Atkinson (born 29 November 1996) is a Manx swimmer. She competed in both the women's 100 and 200 m butterfly events at the 2017 World Aquatics Championships.
