= Swimming at the 2013 Island Games =

Swimming, for the 2013 Island Games, took place at the National Sports Center in Devonshire Parish, Bermuda. Competition took place from 15 to 18 July 2013. The events were held in a short course (25 m) pool.

== Medal table ==
* Host nation (Bermuda)

Rank	Nation	Gold	Silver	Bronze	Total
1	Jersey	11	11	10	32
2	Cayman Islands	9	8	4	21
3	Isle of Man	7	7	2	16
4	Bermuda*	5	4	7	16
5	Shetland	4	5	1	10
6	Guernsey	3	4	15	22
7	Gotland	3	0	1	4
8	Gibraltar	0	1	1	2
8	Saare County	0	1	1	2
10	Menorca	0	1	0	1
Totals (10 entries)		42	42	42	126

Source: Bermuda 2013 Swimming Medal Tally

== Medal summary of events ==
=== Men's events ===
Event	Gold		Silver		Bronze	
50m freestyle	Brett Fraser (CAY)	21.73	Miles Munro (GGY)	22.35	Shaune Fraser (CAY)	22.37
100m freestyle	Brett Fraser (CAY)	47.65	Shaune Fraser (CAY)	47.79	Miles Munro (GGY)	49.09
200m freestyle	Tom Gallichan (Jersey)	1:50.12	Jeremy Osborne (GGY)	1:51.84	Felix Gifford (Shetland Islands)	1:53.88
400m freestyle	Geoffrey Butler (CAY)	3:56.91	Felix Gifford (Shetland Islands)	3:57.15	Cameron Donaldson (Jersey)	4:02.48
1,500m freestyle	Cameron Donaldson (Jersey)	15:40.50	Geoffrey Butler (CAY)	15:46.87	Oliver Nightingale (GGY)	15:59.38
50m backstroke	Grant Halsall (IOM)	25.00	Simon Le Couillard (Jersey)	26.01	Xander Beaton (GGY)	26.87
100m backstroke	Grant Halsall (IOM)	54.69	Tom Gallichan (Jersey)	57.24	James Jurkiewicz (GGY)	57.68
200m backstroke	Grant Halsall (IOM)	2:01.09	Tom Gallichan (Jersey)	2:03.99	James Jurkiewicz (GGY)	2:04.20
50m breaststroke	Ian Black (Jersey)	28.43	Priit Aavik (Saaremaa)	29.82	Matthew Brehaut (Jersey)	29.99
100m breaststroke	Ian Black (Jersey)	1:01.71	Giovanni Guarino (Jersey)	1:03.77	Luke Belton (GGY)	1:05.26
200m breaststroke	Giovanni Guarino (Jersey)	2:17.68	Guy Davies (IOM)	2:21.47	Colin Bensadon (GIB)	2:22.12
50m butterfly	Brett Fraser (CAY)	23.26	Shaune Fraser (CAY)	23.44	Thomas Hollingsworth (GGY)	24.27
100m butterfly	Shaune Fraser (CAY)	51.06	Brett Fraser (CAY)	51.59	Grant Halsall (IOM)	53.69
200m butterfly	Felix Gifford (Shetland Islands)	2:02.19	Josep Mercadal Mascaró (Menorca)	2:02.67	Ben Lowndes (GGY)	2:05.52
100m individual medley	Grant Halsall (IOM)	55.39	Ian Black (Jersey)	56.67	Priit Aavik (Saaremaa)	57.98
200m individual medley	Ian Black (Jersey)	2:04.77	Felix Gifford (Shetland Islands)	2:05.97	Jeremy Osborne (GGY)	2:07.26
400m individual medley	Felix Gifford (Shetland Islands)	4:25.40	Colin Bensadon (GIB)	4:30.97	Cameron Donaldson (Jersey)	4:31.28
4×50m freestyle relay	Guernsey; Thomas Hollingsworth; Ben Lowndes; Miles Munro; Jeremy Osborne	1:31.54	Cayman Islands; Geoffrey Butler; Brett Fraser; Shaune Fraser; Alex McCallum	1:32.02	Jersey; Ian Black; Tom Gallichan; Simon Le Couillard; Stefan McGreevy	1:33.40
4 × 100 m freestyle relay	Cayman Islands; Geoffrey Butler; Brett Fraser; Shaune Fraser; Alex McCallum	3:20.65	Guernsey; Thomas Hollingsworth; Ben Lowndes; Miles Munro; Jeremy Osborne	3:21.53	Jersey; Ian Black; Tom Gallichan; Simon Le Couillard; Stefan McGreevy	3:26.43
4×50m medley relay	Guernsey; Xander Beaton; Luke Belton; Thomas Hollingsworth; Miles Munro	1:42.53	Jersey; Ian Black; Tom Gallichan; Simon Le Couillard; Stefan McGreevy	1:43.65	Cayman Islands; Geoffrey Butler; Brett Fraser; Shaune Fraser; Alex McCallum	1:44.62
4 × 100 m medley relay	Guernsey; Luke Belton; Thomas Hollingsworth; Miles Munro; Oliver Nightingale	3:45.87	Cayman Islands; Geoffrey Butler; Brett Fraser; Shaune Fraser; Alex McCallum	3:46.71	Jersey; Ian Black; Tom Gallichan; Simon Le Couillard; Stefan McGreevy	3:47.03

=== Women's events ===
Event	Gold		Silver		Bronze	
50m freestyle	Ashley Yearwood (BER)	26.50	Andrea Strachan (Shetland Islands)	26.56	Courtney Butcher (GGY)	26.72
100m freestyle	Emily Bashforth (Jersey)	56.31	Ashley Yearwood (BER)	57.33	Courtney Butcher (GGY)	57.61
200m freestyle	Emily Bashforth (Jersey)	2:00.14	Courtney Butcher (GGY)	2:03.56	Beth Cumming (Jersey)	2:03.77
400m freestyle	Emily Bashforth (Jersey)	4:17.95	Charlotte Atkinson (IOM)	4:22.01	Annalise Munro (GGY)	4:25.12
800m freestyle	Emily Bashforth (Jersey)	8:59.64	Beckie Scaife (Jersey)	9:04.43	Annalise Munro (GGY)	9:09.85
50m backstroke	Charlotte Atkinson (IOM)	29.47	Lara Butler (CAY)	29.91	Ashley Yearwood (BER)	30.18
100m backstroke	Lara Butler (CAY)	1:03.36	Rebecca Sharpe (BER)	1:03.57	Ashley Yearwood (BER)	1:03.62
200m backstroke	Rebecca Sharpe (BER)	2:16.49	Lara Butler (CAY)	2:18.31	Emily Bashforth (Jersey)	2:18.95
50m breaststroke	Andrea Strachan (Shetland Islands)	31.36	Laura Kinley (IOM)	32.32	Lisa Blackburn (BER)	33.05
100m breaststroke	Andrea Strachan (Shetland Islands)	1:08.56	Laura Kinley (IOM)	1:10.36	Ida Sandin (Gotland)	1:10.54
200m breaststroke	Laura Kinley (IOM)	2:32.60	Charlotte Manning (Jersey)	2:34.38	Lisa Blackburn (BER)	2:36.76
50m butterfly	Charlotte Atkinson (IOM)	27.73	Ashley Yearwood (BER)	28.92	Rebecca Heyliger (BER)	29.20
100m butterfly	Ida Sandin (Gotland)	1:00.31	Charlotte Atkinson (IOM)	1:02.19	Lara Butler (CAY)	1:02.30
200m butterfly	Lara Butler (CAY)	2:16.45	Charlotte Atkinson (IOM)	2:17.60	Emily Bashforth (Jersey)	2:20.72
100m individual medley	Ida Sandin (Gotland)	1:02.25	Andrea Strachan (Shetland Islands)	1:04.19	Lisa Blackburn (BER)	1:05.47
200m individual medley	Ida Sandin (Gotland)	2:14.22	Andrea Strachan (Shetland Islands)	2:18.67	Lara Butler (CAY)	2:20.15
400m individual medley	Lara Butler (CAY)	4:56.29	Beckie Scaife (Jersey)	5:00.45	Lisa Blackburn (BER)	5:02.40
4×50m freestyle relay	Bermuda; Lisa Blackburn; Rebecca Heyliger; Madelyn Moore; Ashley Yearwood	1:46.04	Jersey; Gemma Atherley; Emily Bashforth; Beth Cumming; Beckie Scaife	1:47.78	Guernsey; Courtney Butcher; Annalise Munro; Victoria Parfit; Leah Winberg	1:48.49
4 × 100 m freestyle relay	Jersey; Gemma Atherley; Emily Bashforth; Beth Cumming; Beckie Scaife	3:50.46	Bermuda; Lisa Blackburn; Rebecca Heyliger; Madelyn Moore; Ashley Yearwood	3:53.46	Guernsey; Courtney Butcher; Annalise Munro; Victoria Parfit; Leah Winberg	3:55.75
4×50m medley relay	Bermuda; Lisa Blackburn; Rebecca Heyliger; Madelyn Moore; Ashley Yearwood	1:58.16	Isle of Man; Charlotte Atkinson; Stephanie Brew; Allana Kelly; Laura Kinley	1:59.20	Jersey; Gemma Atherley; Emily Bashforth; Charlotte Manning; Kerrie Smith	2:01.89
4 × 100 m medley relay	Bermuda; Lisa Blackburn; Rebecca Heyliger; Rebecca Sharpe; Ashley Yearwood	4:19.22	Jersey; Emily Bashforth; Beth Cumming; Charlotte Manning; Kerrie Smith	4:19.80	Isle of Man; Charlotte Atkinson; Stephanie Brew; Allana Kelly; Laura Kinley	4:25.58

=== Mixed ===
Event	Gold		Silver		Bronze	
8×50m freestyle relay	Guernsey; Courtney Butcher; Thomas Hollingsworth; Ben Lowndes; Alicia Munro; Miles Munro; Jeremy Osborne; Victoria Parfit; Leah Winberg	3:22.46	Bermuda; Lisa Blackburn; Rebecca Heyliger; Madelyn Moore; Benedict Parfit; Jesse Washington; Ashley Yearwood; Andrew Beveridge; Nicholas Patterson	3:22.84	Isle of Man; Charlotte Atkinson; Tom Bielich; Stephanie Brew; Ciara Cassidy; Mark Copparelli; Luke Guthrie; Grant Halsall; Laura Kinley	3:28.36
