= Signhild Joensen =

Faroese swimmer

Personal information
- Nationality: Faroese
- Born: 14 November 2000 (age 25)

Sport
- Sport: Swimming
- Strokes: Backstroke, freestyle
Medal record
Women's swimming
Representing Faroe Islands
Island Games
| Gold medal – first place | 2015 Jersey | 4×50 m medley |
| Gold medal – first place | 2017 Gotland | 100 m backstroke |
| Gold medal – first place | 2017 Gotland | 200 m backstroke |
| Gold medal – first place | 2017 Gotland | 4×100 m freestyle |
| Gold medal – first place | 2017 Gotland | 4×100 m medley |
| Gold medal – first place | 2019 Gibraltar | 100 m backstroke |
| Gold medal – first place | 2019 Gibraltar | 200 m backstroke |
| Silver medal – second place | 2015 Jersey | 4×50 m freestyle |
| Silver medal – second place | 2015 Jersey | 4×100 m medley |
| Silver medal – second place | 2017 Gotland | 50 m backstroke |
| Silver medal – second place | 2017 Gotland | 4×50 m medley |
| Silver medal – second place | 2019 Gibraltar | 50 m backstroke |
| Bronze medal – third place | 2015 Jersey | 200 m backstroke |
| Bronze medal – third place | 2015 Jersey | 4×100 m freestyle |
| Bronze medal – third place | 2017 Gotland | 200 m freestyle |
| Bronze medal – third place | 2017 Gotland | 4×50 m freestyle |
| Bronze medal – third place | 2019 Gibraltar | 4×50 m freestyle |
| Bronze medal – third place | 2019 Gibraltar | 4×100 m freestyle |
| Bronze medal – third place | 2019 Gibraltar | 4×50 m medley |

Signhild Joensen (born 14 November 2000) is a Faroese swimmer. She competed in the women's 200 metre backstroke event at the 2017 World Aquatics Championships.
