= 2022 FINA World Swimming Championships (25 m) – Women's 50 metre butterfly =

Swimming competition

Women's 50 metre butterfly at the 2022 FINA World Swimming Championships (25 m)
- Venue: Melbourne Sports and Aquatic Centre
- Location: Melbourne, Australia
- Dates: 13 December (heats and semifinals); 14 December (final)
- Competitors: 42 from 37 nations
- Winning time: 24.64

Medalists
gold medal	Torri Huske	United States
gold medal	Maggie Mac Neil	Canada
bronze medal	Zhang Yufei	China

The Women's 50 metre butterfly competition of the 2022 FINA World Swimming Championships (25 m) was held on 13 and 14 December 2022.

== Records ==
Prior to the competition, the existing world and championship records were as follows.

World record	Therese Alshammar (SWE)	24.38	Singapore	22 November 2009
Competition record	Ranomi Kromowidjojo (NED)	24.44	Abu Dhabi, United Arab Emirates	19 December 2021

== Results ==
=== Heats ===
The heats were started on 13 December at 11:59.

Rank	Heat	Lane	Name	Nationality	Time	Notes
1	6	5	Zhang Yufei	China	24.75	Q, NR
2	5	5	Mélanie Henique	France	24.88	Q
3	4	6	Sara Junevik	Sweden	25.04	Q
4	4	4	Torri Huske	United States	25.11	Q
5	5	4	Maggie Mac Neil	Canada	25.13	Q
6	6	2	Wang Yichun	China	25.28	Q
7	4	3	Béryl Gastaldello	France	25.30	Q
8	5	3	Ai Soma	Japan	25.32	Q
8	6	3	Silvia Di Pietro	Italy	25.32	Q
10	4	5	Maaike de Waard	Netherlands	25.40	Q
11	6	4	Claire Curzan	United States	25.43	Q
12	6	6	Moe Tsuda	Japan	25.47	Q
13	6	7	Katerine Savard	Canada	25.50	Q
14	5	6	Julie Kepp Jensen	Denmark	25.51	Q
15	5	2	Helena Gasson	New Zealand	25.63	Q
16	4	2	Alexandria Perkins	Australia	25.65	Q
17	5	7	Jenjira Srisaard	Thailand	25.85	NR
17	6	1	Angelina Köhler	Germany	25.85	
17	6	8	Neža Klančar	Slovenia	25.85	NR
20	3	4	Anicka Delgado	Ecuador	26.04	NR
21	5	1	Barbora Seemanova	Czech Republic	26.09	=NR
22	4	1	Sirena Rowe	Colombia	26.12	NR
23	5	8	Lillian Slušná	Slovakia	26.30	
24	3	6	Jillian Crooks	Cayman Islands	26.40	NR
25	3	5	Huang Mei-chien	Chinese Taipei	26.47	NR
26	4	7	Giovanna Diamante	Brazil	26.48	
27	4	8	Chan Kin Lok	Hong Kong	27.08	
28	3	3	Olivia Borg	Samoa	27.09	NR
29	3	2	Imara-Bella Thorpe	Suspended Member Federation	27.38	
30	3	1	Tara Naluwoza	Uganda	27.71	NR
31	3	7	Rhaniska Gibbs	Bahamas	28.07	
32	3	8	Emily Visagie	South Africa	28.39	
33	2	4	Nubia Adjei	Ghana	29.11	NR
34	1	4	Cassandre Zenon	Cameroon	29.32	
35	2	3	Georgia-Leigh Vele	Papua New Guinea	29.81	
36	2	6	Taffi Illis	Sint Maarten	31.16	
37	2	2	Kestra Kihleng	Federated States of Micronesia	31.25	
38	1	3	Rachel Sanders	Gibraltar	31.29	
39	1	6	Rosha Neupane	Nepal	31.95	
40	2	7	Jessica Makwenda	Malawi	35.18	
41	2	1	Galyah Mikel	Palau	36.90	
42	2	8	Marie Amenou	Togo	43.54	
	1	2	María Castillo	Panama	Did not start	
	1	5	Yaba Kamara	Sierra Leone	Did not start	
	2	5	Rosemarie Rova	Fiji	Did not start	

=== Semifinals ===
The semifinals were started on 13 December at 19:45.

Rank	Heat	Lane	Name	Nationality	Time	Notes
1	2	3	Maggie Mac Neil	Canada	24.78	Q
2	2	4	Zhang Yufei	China	24.79	Q
3	1	5	Torri Huske	United States	24.86	Q
4	1	2	Maaike de Waard	Netherlands	24.92	Q
4	1	4	Mélanie Henique	France	24.92	Q
6	2	7	Claire Curzan	United States	24.96	Q
7	2	6	Béryl Gastaldello	France	25.06	Q
8	2	5	Sara Junevik	Sweden	25.13	Q
9	1	3	Wang Yichun	China	25.14	
10	1	6	Ai Soma	Japan	25.36	
11	2	8	Helena Gasson	New Zealand	25.38	NR
12	1	7	Moe Tsuda	Japan	25.41	
13	2	2	Silvia Di Pietro	Italy	25.42	
14	1	1	Julie Kepp Jensen	Denmark	25.56	
15	1	8	Alexandria Perkins	Australia	25.60	
16	2	1	Katerine Savard	Canada	25.81	

=== Final ===
The final was held on 14 December at 21:14.

Rank	Lane	Name	Nationality	Time	Notes
1st place, gold medalist(s)	3	Torri Huske	United States	24.64	
1st place, gold medalist(s)	4	Maggie Mac Neil	Canada	24.64	NR
3rd place, bronze medalist(s)	5	Zhang Yufei	China	24.71	=AS
4	1	Béryl Gastaldello	France	24.85	
5	2	Mélanie Henique	France	24.92	
5	7	Claire Curzan	United States	24.92	
7	6	Maaike de Waard	Netherlands	24.98	
8	8	Sara Junevik	Sweden	25.18	
