= Priit Aavik =

Estonian swimmer Priit Aavik represented Saaremaa at Island Games from 2009

Personal information
- Nationality: Estonian
- Born: 7 November 1994 (age 31) Kuressaare, Estonia
- Weight: 186cm

Sport
- Sport: Swimming
- Club: Kuressaare U-klubi (2003-2010), Audentese Spordiklubi (2010-2017)
Medal record
Men's swimming
Representing (Saare County)
Island Games
Gold medal – first place	2017 Gotland	50 m butterfly
Gold medal – first place	2017 Gotland	100 m medley
Silver medal – second place	2017 Gotland	50 m backstroke
Silver medal – second place	2017 Gotland	100 m backstroke
Silver medal – second place	2013 Bermuda	50 m breaststroke
Bronze medal – third place	2013 Bermuda	100 m medley

Priit Aavik (born 7 November 1994) is an Estonian swimmer. He represent Saaremaa at the Island Games since 2009.
