= Sára Nysted =

Faroese swimmer

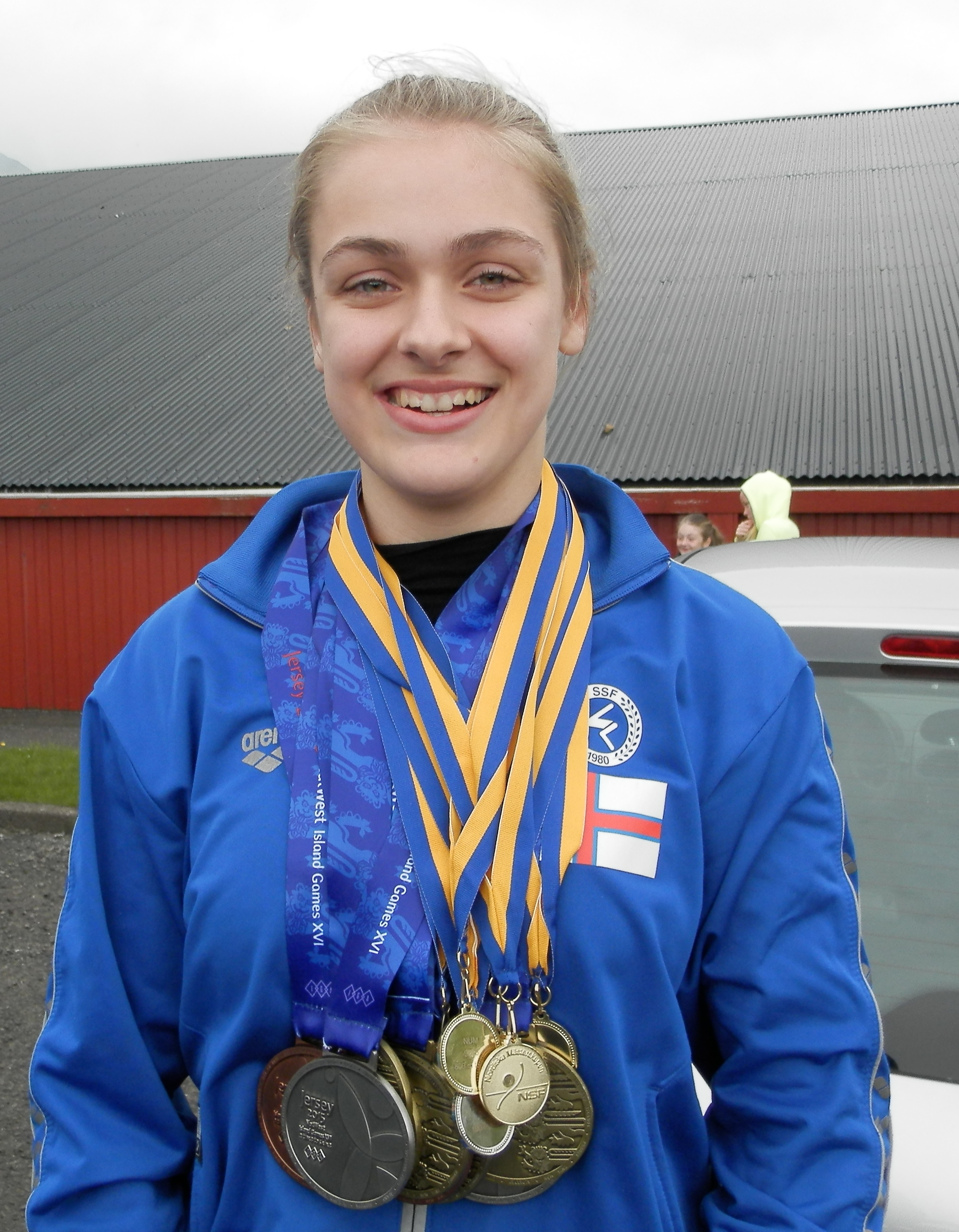
- Sára Nysted in 2015

Personal information
- Full name: Sára Ryggshamar Nysted
- Born: 19 January 2001 (age 25)

Sport
- Sport: Swimming
Medal record
Women's swimming
Representing Faroe Islands
Island Games
Gold medal – first place	2017 Gotland	100 m medley
Gold medal – first place	2017 Gotland	400 m medley
Gold medal – first place	2017 Gotland	4×100 m freestyle relay
Gold medal – first place	2017 Gotland	4×100 m medley relay
Gold medal – first place	2015 Jersey	200 m freestyle
Gold medal – first place	2015 Jersey	400 m freestyle
Gold medal – first place	2015 Jersey	800 m freestyle
Gold medal – first place	2015 Jersey	400 m medley
Gold medal – first place	2015 Jersey	4×50 m medley relay
Silver medal – second place	2017 Gotland	200 m medley
Silver medal – second place	2017 Gotland	4×50 m medley relay
Silver medal – second place	2015 Jersey	4×50 m freestyle relay
Silver medal – second place	2015 Jersey	4×100 m medley relay
Bronze medal – third place	2017 Gotland	4×50 m freestyle relay
Bronze medal – third place	2015 Jersey	100 m freestyle
Bronze medal – third place	2015 Jersey	200 m medley
Bronze medal – third place	2015 Jersey	4×100 m freestyle relay

Sára Ryggshamar Nysted (born 19 January 2001) is a Faroese swimmer. She competed in the women's 200 and 400 metre individual medley event at the 2017 World Aquatics Championships.
