= Swimming at the 2015 Island Games =

Swimming, for the 2015 Island Games, took place at the Les Quennevais Sports Centre and Playing Fields in Saint Brélade, Jersey. Competition took place from 29 to 2 July 2015. The events were held in a short course (25 m) pool.

== Medal table ==
* Host nation (Jersey)

Final medal table
Rank	Nation	Gold	Silver	Bronze	Total
1	Faroe Islands	10	10	16	36
2	Isle of Man	8	4	6	18
3	Guernsey	7	6	7	20
4	Jersey*	6	9	9	24
5	Cayman Islands	5	7	2	14
6	Shetland	4	2	1	7
7	Western Isles	2	3	0	5
8	Isle of Wight	0	1	1	2
Totals (8 entries)		42	42	42	126

== Medal summary of events ==
=== Men's events ===
Event	Gold		Silver		Bronze	
50m freestyle	Miles Munro (GUE)	22.45	Garth Jackson (JER)	23.44	Eyðbjørn Joensen (FAR)	23.62
100m freestyle	Brett Fraser (CAY)	49.13	Shaune Fraser (CAY)	49.64	Miles Munro (GUE)	50.03
200m freestyle	Pál Joensen (FRO)	1:49.31	Thomas Gallichan (JER)	1:50.40	Óli Mortensen (FRO)	1:52.03
400m freestyle	Pál Joensen (FAR)	3:53.27	Óli Mortensen (FAR)	3:54.65	Felix Gifford (SHE)	3:55.75
1500m freestyle	Pál Joensen (FAR)	14:57.73	Óli Mortensen (FAR)	15:34.06	Cameron Donaldson (JER)	15:38.94
50m backstroke	Thomas Hollingsworth (GUE)	25.03	Thomas Gallichan (JER)	26.15	Harry Shalomon (JER)	26.43
100m backstroke	Thomas Hollingsworth (GUE)	53.95	Thomas Gallichan (JER)	56.45	Harry Shalomon (JER)	56.50
200m backstroke	Thomas Gallichan (JER)	2:01.97	Alexander McCallum (CAY)	2:05.59	Nathan Corrigan (JER)	2:06.25
50m breaststroke	Ian Black (JER)	27.80	Pál Joensen (FAR)	29.19	Guy Davies (IOM)	29.53
100m breaststroke	Ian Black (JER)	1:00.24	Pál Joensen (FAR)	1:02.80	Guy Davies (IOM)	1:03.69
200m breaststroke	Pál Joensen (FAR)	2:14.82	Guy Davies (IOM)	2:16.81	Giovanni Guarino (JER)	2:17.22
50m butterfly	Brett Fraser (CAY)	23.96	Shaune Fraser (CAY)	24.32	Thomas Hollingsworth (GUE)	24.61
100m butterfly	Shaune Fraser (CAY)	52.41	Brett Fraser (CAY)	53.06	Thomas Hollingsworth (GGY)	53.60
200m butterfly	Felix Gifford (SHE)	2:02.07	Thomas Hollingsworth (GUE)	2:02.19	Óli Mortensen (FAR)	2:04.21
100m individual medley	Shaune Fraser (CAY)	54.42	Thomas Hollingsworth (GUE)	56.32	Ian Black (JER)	56.63
200m individual medley	Shaune Fraser (CAY)	2:01.58	Pál Joensen (FAR)	2:02.88	Alvi Hjelm (FAR)	2:05.29
400m individual medley	Pál Joensen (FRO)	4:21.55	Alvi Hjelm (FRO)	4:24.25	Cameron Donaldson (JER)	4:30.30
4×50m freestyle relay	Guernsey; Matthew Girard; Thomas Hollingsworth; Ben Lowndes; Miles Monro; James Jurkiewicz; Joshua Lewis	1:31.85	Jersey; Ian Black; Thomas Gallichan; Garth Jackson; Harry Shalaman; Cameron Donaldson; Cameron Swart	1:32.49	Cayman Islands; Geoffrey Butler; Brett Fraser; Shaune Fraser; Alexander McCallum; Jonathan Key; Iain McCallum	1:32.61
4 × 100 m freestyle relay	Guernsey; Matthew Girard; Thomas Hollingsworth; Ben Lowndes; Miles Monro; James Jurkiewicz; Joshua Lewis	3:21.46	Jersey; Ian Black; Thomas Gallichan; Garth Jackson; Harry Shalaman; Cameron Donaldson; Cameron Swart	3:23.44	Faroe Islands; Eyðbjørn Joensen; Pál Joensen; Óli Toftum; Róland Toftum; Marius Gardshodn; Alvi Hjelm	3:26.31
4×50m medley relay	Jersey; Ian Black; Thomas Gallichan; Garth Jackson; Harry Shalaman; Thomas Cairns; Cameron Swart	1:40.84	Guernsey; Matthew Girard; Thomas Hollingsworth; Ben Lowndes; Miles Munro; James Jurkiewicz; Joshua Lewis; William Mansell	1:41.54	Faroe Islands; Eyðbjørn Joensen; Pál Joensen; Óli Toftum; Róland Toftum; Marius Gardshodn; Bartal Hestoy	1:44.22
4 × 100 m medley relay	Jersey; Ian Black; Cameron Donaldson; Thomas Gallichan; Harry Shalomon; Nathan Corrigan; Giovanni Guarino	3:42.91	Guernsey; Thomas Hollingsworth; James Jurkiewicz; Ben Lowndes; Miles Munro; Matthew Girard; Joshua Lewis	3:46.99	Faroe Islands; Alvi Hjelm; Pál Joensen; Óli Mortensen; Róland Toftum; Marius Gardshodn; Bartal Hestoy; Eyðbjørn Joensen	3:50.51

=== Women's events ===
Event	Gold		Silver		Bronze	
50m freestyle	Charlotte Atkinson (IOM)	26.14	Andrea Strachan (SHE)	26.43	Laura Kinley (IOM)	26.54
100m freestyle	Charlotte Atkinson (IOM)	57.03	Courtney Butcher (GUE)	57.70	Sára Nysted (FAR)	57.95
200m freestyle	Sára Nysted (FAR)	2:02.60	Gemma Atherley (JER)	2:02.99	Courtney Butcher (GUE)	2:05.42
400m freestyle	Sára Nysted (FAR)	4:21.27	Gemma Atherly (JER)	4:21.43	Vár Eidesgaard (FAR)	4:24.72
800m freestyle	Sára Nysted (FRO)	8:59.90	Vár Eidesgaard (FRO)	9:05.40	Annalise Munro (GGY)	9:12.29
50m backstroke	Kathryn Offer (WES)	28.79	Courtney Butcher (GGY)	29.83	Izabella Blacklock (IOW)	30.24
100m backstroke	Courtney Butcher (GGY)	1:03.13	Izabella Blacklock (IOW)	1:03.91	Lara Butler (CAY)	1:03.94
200m backstroke	Courtney Butcher (GUE)	2:15.32	Lara Butler (CAY)	2:18.43	Signhild Joensen (FAR)	2:18.63
50m breaststroke	Andrea Strachan (SHE)	31.68	Kara Hanlon (WES)	31.72	Laura Kinley (IOM)	32.20
100m breaststroke	Andrea Strachan (SHE)	1:08.33	Kara Hanlon (WES)	1:08.54	Laura Kinley (IOM)	1:10.21
200m breaststroke	Kara Hanlon (WES)	2:28.66	Laura Kinley (IOM)	2:29.64	Ásbjørg Hjelm (FRO)	2:37.08
50m butterfly	Charlotte Atkinson (IOM)	27.25	Astrið Foldarskarð (FAR)	28.13	Olivia Rose Pollard (JER)	28.19
100m butterfly	Charlotte Atkinson (IOM)	59.31	Olivia Rose Pollard (JER)	1:01.63	Astrið Foldarskarð (FAR)	1:02.76
200m butterfly	Charlotte Atkinson (IOM)	2.09.37	Lara Butler (CAY)	2.18.01	Jonna Thomsen (FAR)	2.18.67
100m individual medley	Andrea Strachan (SHE)	1.03.15	Kara Hanlon (WES)	1.05.17	Laura Kinley (IOM)	1.05.65
200m individual medley	Charlotte Atkinson (IOM)	2:14.71	Andrea Strachan (SHE)	2:17.43	Sára Nysted (FAR)	2:18.78
400m individual medley	Sára Nysted (FAR)	4:51.57	Lara Butler (CAY)	5:00.65	Vár Eidesgaard (FAR)	5:04.46
4×50m freestyle relay	Isle of Man; Charlotte Atkinson; Emma Hodgson; Amy Kinley; Laura Kinley; Steph Brew; Ciara Cassidy	1:47.07	Faroe Islands; Astrið Foldarskarð; Lív Eidesgaard; Vár Eidesgaard; Sára Nysted; Maria Antoft; Ásbjørg Hjelm; Signhild Joensen; Jonna Thomsen	1:47.40	Guernsey; Courtney Butcher; Annabelle Goubert; Robyn le Friec; Annalise Munro; Sophie De La Mare; Enya Rabey	1:48.32
4 × 100 m freestyle relay	Jersey; Gemma Atherley; Susanah Phillips; Olivia Rose Pollard; Beckie Scaife; Beth Cumming; Danielle Edwards	3:52.88	Isle of Man; Charlotte Atkinson; Steph Brew; Emma Hodgson; Laura Kinley; Ciara Cassidy; Amy Kinley; Kazia Whittaker	3:53.29	Faroe Islands; Astrið Foldarskarð; Lív Eidesgaard; Vár Eidesgaard; Sára Nysted; Maria Antoft; Ásbjørg Hjelm; Signhild Joensen; Jonna Thomsen	3:54.02
4×50m medley relay	Faroe Islands; Astrið Foldarskarð; Ásbjørg Hjelm; Signhild Joensen; Sára Nysted; Maria Antoft; Lív Eidesgaard	1:57.06	Isle of Man; Charlotte Atkinson; Steph Brew; Emma Hodgson; Laura Kinley; Ciara Cassidy; Amy Kinley; Kazia Whittaker	1:58.56	Jersey; Gemma Atherley; Beth Cumming; Holly Hughes; Olivia Rose Pollard; Lillie Godden; Susanah Phillips; Beckie Scaife	1:59.80
4 × 100 m medley relay	Isle of Man; Charlotte Atkinson; Steph Brew; Emma Hodgson; Laura Kinley; Ciara Cassidy; Amy Kinley; Kazia Whittaker	4:15.64	Faroe Islands; Astrið Foldarskarð; Ásbjørg Hjelm; Signhild Joensen; Sára Nysted; Vár Eidesgaard; Jonna Thomsen	4:19.41	Guernsey; Courtney Butcher; Annabelle Goubert; Robyn le Friec; Annalise Munro; Sophie De La Mare; Enya Rabey	4:29.33
