= Raya Embury-Brown =

Caymanian swimmer (born 2004)

Personal information
- Born: 20 October 2004 (age 21)

Sport
- Sport: Swimming
Medal record
Women's swimming
Representing Cayman Islands
Island Games
Silver medal – second place	2019 Gibraltar	800 m freestyle
Silver medal – second place	2019 Gibraltar	1500 m freestyle

Raya Embury-Brown (born 20 October 2004) is a swimmer from the Cayman Islands. She represented Cayman Islands at the 2019 World Aquatics Championships held in Gwangju, South Korea. She competed in the women's 400 metre freestyle and women's 800 metre freestyle events. In both events she did not advance to compete in the final. She also competed in the 4 × 100 metre mixed freestyle relay event.

In 2019, she won the silver medal in both the women's 800 metre freestyle and women's 1500 metre freestyle events at the Island Games in Gibraltar.

She represented the Cayman Islands at the 2022 Commonwealth Games held in Birmingham, England.
