= Swimming at the 2017 Island Games =

- Dates: June 24 – 30
- Host city: Gotland, Sweden
- Venue: Solbergabadet, Visby
- Level: Senior

Swimming, for the 2017 Island Games, held at the Solbergabadet, Visby, Gotland, Sweden in June 2017. The events were held in a short course (25 m) pool.

== Medal table ==
| Rank | Nation | Gold | Silver | Bronze | Total |
|---|---|---|---|---|---|
| 1 | Faroe Islands | 15 | 10 | 10 | 35 |
| 2 | Guernsey | 11 | 6 | 12 | 29 |
| 3 | Isle of Man | 7 | 13 | 5 | 25 |
| 4 | Western Isles | 5 | 0 | 1 | 6 |
| 5 | Jersey | 2 | 4 | 1 | 7 |
| 6 | Saare County | 2 | 2 | 0 | 4 |
| 7 | Shetland | 1 | 3 | 2 | 6 |
| 8 | Cayman Islands | 0 | 2 | 4 | 6 |
| 9 | Isle of Wight | 0 | 1 | 4 | 5 |
| 10 | Åland | 0 | 1 | 3 | 4 |
| 11 | (Anglesey) Ynys Môn | 0 | 1 | 1 | 2 |
| Totals (11 entries) | | 43 | 43 | 43 | 129 |

== Results ==
=== Men’s ===
| Event | Gold | | Silver | | Bronze | |
|---|---|---|---|---|---|---|
| Backstroke 50m | Thomas Hollingsworth (GGY) | 25.43 | Priit Aavik (Saaremaa) | 25.72 | Oliver Nightingale (GGY) | 26.64 |
| Backstroke 100m | Thomas Hollingsworth (GGY) | 55.78 | Priit Aavik (Saaremaa) | 57.45 | Oliver Nightingale (GGY) | 58.95 |
| Backstroke 200m | Thomas Hollingsworth (GGY) | 2:02.65 | Alvi Hjelm (FRO) | 2:06.16 | Dillon Pestana (JEY) | 2:07.52 |
| Breaststroke 50m | Guy Davies (IOM) | 28.69 | Róland Toftum (FRO) | 29.18 | Brody Hewison (IOM) | 30.06 |
| Breaststroke 100m | Guy Davies (IOM) | 1:01.71 | Róland Toftum (FRO) | 1:03.76 | Rókur Trygavson (FRO) | 1:05.89 |
| Breaststroke 200m | Guy Davies (IOM) | 2:16.67 | Alvi Hjelm (FRO) | 2:19.21 | Róland Toftum (FRO) | 2:23.02 |
| Butterfly 50m | Priit Aavik (Saaremaa) | 25.03 | Miles Munro (GGY) | 25.21 | Gustav Carlosson (ALA) | 25.36 |
| Butterfly 100m | Thomas Hollingsworth (GGY) | 56.13 | Brody Hewison (IOM) | 56.26 | Gustav Carlsson (ALA) | 56.91 |
| Butterfly 200m | Óli Mortensen (FRO) | 2:01.46 | Felix Gifford (Shetland) | 2:04.16 | Ben Lowndes (GGY) | 2:06.05 |
| Freestyle 50m | Miles Munro (GGY) | 22.09 | Jonathan Beck (GGY) | 23.43 | Samuel Tinson-Wood (IOW) | 23.65 |
| Freestyle 100m | Miles Munro (GGY) | 49.15 | Joel Watterson (IOM) | 51.67 | Jonathan Beck (GGY) | 51.71 |
| Freestyle 200m | Óli Mortensen (FRO) | 1:50.45 | Alex Bregazzi (IOM) | 1:50.57 | Joel Watterson (IOM) | 1:51.57 |
| Freestyle 400m | Óli Mortensen (FRO) | 3:53.21 | Felix Gifford (Shetland) | 3:56.21 | Marius Ihlen Gardshodn (FRO) | 3:59.245 |
| Freestyle 1500m | Óli Mortensen (FRO) | 15:59.77 | Marius Ihlen Gardshodn (FRO) | 16:02.02 | Edward Weber, IV (CAY) | 16:14.99 |
| Medley 100m | Priit Aavik (Saaremaa) | 57.55 | Ben Lowndes (GGY) | 58.78 | Alvi Hjelm (FRO) | 58.85 |
| Medley 200m | Felix Gifford (Shetland) | 2:04.52 | Alvi Hjelm (FRO) | 2:04.53 | Alex Bregazzi (IOM) | 2:07.45 |
| Medley 400m | Alvi Hjelm (FRO) | 4:22.01 | Felix Gifford (Shetland) | 4:29.17 | Edward Weber, IV (CAY) | 4:37.14 |
| Relay 4 x 50m freestyle | Guernsey; Jonathan Beck; Thomas Hollingsworth; Ben Lowndes; William Mansell; Miles Munro; Tom Teasdale | 1:31.69 | Isle of Man; Alex Bregazzi; Brody Hewison; Euan MacMurchie; Joel Watterson | 1:34.69 | Faroe Islands; Marius Ihlen Gardshodn; Alvi Hjelm; Óli Mortensen; Róland Toftum; Rókur Trygvason | 1:35.86 |
| Relay 4 × 100 m freestyle | Guernsey; Jonathan Beck; Thomas Hollingsworth; Ben Lowndes; William Mansell; Miles Munro; Tom Teasdale | 3:27.53 | Isle of Man; Alex Bregazzi; Guy Davies; Brody Hewison; Euan MacMurchie; Joel Watterson | 3:30.85 | Faroe Islands; Marius Ihlen Gardshodn; Alvi Hjelm; Óli Mortensen; Róland Toftum; Rókur Trygvason | 3:31.55 |
| Relay 4 x 50m medley | Guernsey; Henry Cliff; Thomas Hollingsworth; Ben Lowndes; Miles Munro; Oliver Nightingale; Will Russell | 1:42.87 | Isle of Man; Alex Bregazzi; Guy Davies; Brody Hewison; Joel Watterson | 1:42.90 | Faroe Islands; Marius Ihlen Gardshodn; Alvi Hjelm; Óli Mortensen; Róland Toftum | 1:44.97 |
| Relay 4 × 100 m medley | Isle of Man; Alex Bregazzi; Guy Davies; Brody Hewison; Euan Macmurchie; Joel Watterson | 3:46.87 | Guernsey; Thomas Hollingsworth; Ben Lowndes; Miles Munro; Oliver Nightingale; Will Russell | 3:48.02 | Faroe Islands; Marius Ihlen Gardshodn; Alvi Hjelm; Óli Mortensen; Róland Toftum; Rókur Trygvason | 3:52.71 |

=== Mixed ===
| Event | Gold | | Silver | | Bronze | |
|---|---|---|---|---|---|---|
| Relay 4 x 50m freestyle | Guernsey; Jonathan Beck; Courtney Butcher; Laura Le Cras; Miles Munro; Orla Rabey | 1:38.93 | Isle of Man; Alex Bregazzi; Brody Hewison; Emma Hodgson; Laura Kinley; Olivia Marshall; Joel Watterson | 1:39.96 | Cayman Islands; Rory Barrett; Lauren Hew; Ella Plunkett; Matthew Somerville | 1:40.70 |

=== Women’s ===
| Event | Gold | | Silver | | Bronze | |
|---|---|---|---|---|---|---|
| Backstroke 50m | Kara Aline Hanlon (Western Isles) | 28.64 | Signhild Dánjalsdóttir Joensen (FRO) | 29.31 | Tatiana Tostevin (GGY) | 29.43 |
| Backstroke 100m | Signhild Dánjalsdóttir Joensen (FRO) | 1:02.01 | Gemma Altherley (JEY) | 1:03.07 | Kathryn Adriane Offer (Western Isles) | 1:03.20 |
| Backstroke 200m | Signhild Dánjalsdóttir Joensen (FRO) | 2:12.46 | Gemma Altherley (JEY) | 2:14.69 | Lauren Hew (CAY) | 2:17.78 |
| Breaststroke 50m | Kara Aline Hanlon (Western Isles) | 31.62 | Laura Kinley (IOM) | 32.10 | Steph Brew (IOM) | 32.48 |
| Breaststroke 100m | Laura Kinley (IOM) | 1:09.62 | Steph Brew (IOM) | 1:11.93 | Jasmin Smith (Shetland) | 1:12.86 |
| Breaststroke 200m | Kara Aline Hanlon (Western Isles) | 2:29.08 | Laura Kinley (IOM) | 2:33.53 | Steph Brew (IOM) | 2:36.27 |
| Butterfly 50m | Olivia Marshall (IOM) | 28.27 | Vár Erlingsdóttir Eidesgaard (FRO) | 28.66 | Emmy Hutchison (FRO) | 28.67 |
| Butterfly 100m | Jana Bjartalíð Thomsen (FRO) | 1:03.19 | Eve Goddard-Smith (Ynys Môn) | 1:03.60 | Orla Rabey (GGY) | 1:04.63 |
| Butterfly 200m | Jana Bjartalíð Thomsen (FRO) | 2:20.34 | Robyn Le Friec (GGY) | 2:22.02 | Eve Goddard-Smith (Ynys Môn) | 2:23.42 |
| Freestyle 50m | Kathryn Adriane Offer (Western Isles) | 26.03 | Lauren Hew (CAY) | 26.15 | Olivia Weuro (ALA) | 26.59 |
| Freestyle 100m | Gemma Altherley (JEY) | 57.49 | Olivia Weuro (ALA) | 58.04 | Courtney Butcher (GGY) | 58.16 |
| Freestyle 200m | Gemma Altherley (JEY) | 2:01.59 | Laura Hew (CAY) | 2:03.61 | Signhild Dánjalsdóttir Joensen (FRO) | 2:03.70 |
| Freestyle 400m | Vár Erlingsdóttir Eidesgaard (FRO) | 4:20.42 | Gemma Altherley (JEY) | 4:22.81 | Chloe Plater (IOW) | 4:24.48 |
| Freestyle 800m | Vár Erlingsdóttir Eidesgaard (FRO) | 8:53.57 | Chloe Plater (IOW) | 9:03.17 | Orla Rabey (GGY) | 9:16.41 |
| Medley 100m | Sára Ryggshamar Nysted (FRO) | 1:05.22 | Gemma Altherley (JEY) | 1:05.56 | Charlotte James (IOW) | 1:06.61 |
| Medley 200m | Kara Aline Hanlon (Western Isles) | 2:18.04 | Sára Ryggshamar Nysted (FRO) | 2:21.15 | Laura Le Cras (GGY) | 2:24.28 |
| Medley 400m | Sára Ryggshamar Nysted (FRO) | 4:55.41 | Laura Le Cras (GGY) | 5:07.34 | Chloe Plater (IOW) | 5:08.96 |
| Relay 4 x 50m freestyle | Guernsey; Courtney Butcher; Laura Le Cras; Robyn Le Friec; Orla Rabey; Tatiana Tostevin | 1:45.86 | Isle of Man; Steph Brew; Emma Hodgson; Laura Kinley; Olivia Marshall; Kazia Whittaker | 1:46.39 | Faroe Islands; Beinta Poulsdóttir Debes; Vár Erlingsdóttir Eidesgaard; Ásbjørg Hjelm; Signhild Dánjalsdóttir Joensen; Sára Ryggshamar Nysted; Jana Bjartalíð Thomsen | 1:47.60 |
| Relay 4 × 100 m freestyle | Faroe Islands; Beinta Poulsdóttir Debes; Vár Erlingsdóttir Eidesgaard; Ásbjørg Hjelm; Signhild Dánjalsdóttir Joensen; Sára Ryggshamar Nysted; Jana Bjartalíð Thomsen | 3:51.66 | Isle of Man; Steph Brew; Emma Hodgson; Laura Kinley; Olivia Marshall; Kazia Whittaker | 3:53.56 | Guernsey; Courtney Butcher; Laura Le Cras; Robyn Le Friec; Orla Rabey | 3:53.81 |
| Relay 4 x 50m medley | Isle of Man; Steph Brew; Emma Hodgson; Laura Kinley; Olivia Marshall | 1:55.82 | Faroe Islands; Beinta Poulsdóttir Debes; Vár Erlingsdóttir Eidesgaard; Ásbjørg Hjelm; Signhild Dánjalsdóttir Joensen; Sára Ryggshamar Nysted; Jana Bjartalíð Thomsen | 1:57.45 | Guernsey; Courtney Butcher; Sophie de la Mare; Laura Le Cras; Robyn Le Friec; Tatiana Tostevin | 1:59.36 |
| Relay 4 × 100 m medley | Faroe Islands; Beinta Poulsdóttir Debes; Vár Erlingsdóttir Eidesgaard; Ásbjørg Hjelm; Signhild Dánjalsdóttir Joensen; Sára Ryggshamar Nysted; Jana Bjartalíð Thomsen | 4:15.73 | Isle of Man; Steph Brew; Emma Hodgson; Laura Kinley; Olivia Marshall; Kazia Whittaker | 4:16.34 | Guernsey; Courtney Butcher; Sophie de la Mare; Laura Le Cras; Robyn Le Friec; Tatiana Tostevin | 4:21.06 |
