= Lauren Hew =

Caymanian swimmer (born 1999)

Personal information
- Born: 26 September 1999 (age 26) George Town, Cayman Islands

Sport
- Sport: Swimming
- College team: Florida State University
Medal record
Women's swimming
Representing Cayman Islands
Island Games
Silver medal – second place	2017 Gotland	50 m freestyle
Bronze medal – third place	2017 Gotland	200 m backstroke
Bronze medal – third place	2017 Gotland	4×50 m mixed freestyle

Lauren Hew (born 26 September 1999) is a swimmer from the Cayman Islands.

In 2019, she represented Cayman Islands at the World Aquatics Championships held in Gwangju, South Korea. She competed in the women's 50 metre freestyle and women's 100 metre freestyle events. In both events she did not advance to compete in the semi-finals. She also competed in the 4 × 100 metre mixed freestyle relay event. In the same year, she also represented the Cayman Islands at the 2019 Pan American Games held in Lima, Peru.
