= Swimming at the 2019 Island Games =

International athletics championship event

- Venue: Lathbury Sports Complex
- Dates: 8–11 July

Swimming, for the 2019 Island Games, held at the Lathbury Sports Complex, Gibraltar in July 2019. The events were held in a short course (25 m) pool.

== Medal table ==
Rank	Nation	Gold	Silver	Bronze	Total
1	Isle of Man	13	8	3	24
2	Faroe Islands	13	6	8	27
3	Jersey	9	11	8	28
4	Western Isles	4	1	1	6
5	Guernsey	2	13	8	23
6	Cayman Islands	2	3	4	9
7	Åland	1	0	2	3
8	(Anglesey) Ynys Môn	1	0	0	1
9	Isle of Wight	0	2	3	5
10	Orkney	0	1	0	1
11	Shetland	0	0	8	8
Totals (11 entries)		45	45	45	135

== Results ==
=== Men ===
Event	Gold		Silver		Bronze	
50 m freestyle	Joel Watterson; Isle of Man	22.73	Jonathan Beck; Guernsey	22.87	Jordan Crooks; Cayman Islands	22.96
100 m freestyle	Jordan Crooks; Cayman Islands	49.94	Joel Watterson; Isle of Man	50.25	Alex Bregazzi; Isle of Man	50.63
200 m freestyle	Alex Bregazzi; Isle of Man	1:47.66	Alvi Hjelm; Faroe Islands	1:50.79	Óli Mortensen; Faroe Islands	1:51.53
400 m freestyle	Alex Bregazzi; Isle of Man	3:52.90	Óli Mortensen; Faroe Islands	3:53.05	Felix Gifford; Shetland	3:57.36
800 m freestyle	Óli Mortensen; Faroe Islands	8:09.94	Isaac Dodds; Jersey	8:13.88	Johan Nónskarð Dam; Faroe Islands	8:19.01
1500 m freestyle	Óli Mortensen; Faroe Islands	15:39.74	Isaac Dodds; Jersey	15:40.61	Thomas Deffains; Jersey	15:52.91
50 m backstroke	Harry Shalamon; Jersey	24.31	Thomas Hollingsworth; Guernsey	25.29	Jordan Crooks; Cayman Islands	25.45
100 m backstroke	Harry Shalamon; Jersey	52.82	Thomas Hollingsworth; Guernsey	54.38	Jordan Crooks; Cayman Islands	56.40
200 m backstroke	Harry Shalamon; Jersey	1:56.40	Robert Jones; Jersey	2:00.94	Thomas Hollingsworth; Guernsey	2:01.43
50 m breaststroke	Róland Toftum; Faroe Islands	28.38	Charlie-Joe Hallett; Guernsey	28.70	William Russell; Guernsey	29.28
100 m breaststroke	Róland Toftum; Faroe Islands	1:02.38	Charlie-Joe Hallett; Guernsey	1:02.94	Cameron Polak; Jersey	1:03.45
200 m breaststroke	Charlie-Joe Hallett; Guernsey	2:16.63	Robert Jones; Jersey	2:17.31	Cameron Polak; Jersey	2:20.37
50 m butterfly	Harry Shalamon; Jersey	24.41	Joel Watterson; Isle of Man	24.87	Róland Toftum; Faroe Islands	24.96
100 m butterfly	Harry Shalamon; Jersey	53.32	Thomas Hollingsworth; Guernsey	55.12	Felix Gifford; Shetland	55.67
200 m butterfly	Robert Jones; Jersey	2:02.20	Óli Mortensen; Faroe Islands	2:02.28	Felix Gifford; Shetland	2:04.47
100 m individual medley	Alex Bregazzi; Isle of Man	56.86	Ben Kebbell; Isle of Man	57.51	Robert Jones; Jersey	57.96
200 m individual medley	Harry Shalamon; Jersey	2:00.35	Robert Jones; Jersey	2:02:69	Alvi Hjelm; Faroe Islands	2:02:89
400 m individual medley	Alvi Hjelm; Faroe Islands	4:19.82	Robert Jones; Jersey	4:25.27	Charlie-Joe Hallett; Guernsey	4:27.88
4 × 50 m freestyle relay	Isle of Man; Alex Bregazzi; Ben Kebbell; Euan MacMurchie; Joel Watterson; Peter Allen ^{[a]} Harvey Lowe ^{[a]}	1:32.82	Guernsey; Jonathan Beck; Ben Lowndes; William Russell; Thomas Teasdale; William Mansell ^{[a]}	1:32.87	Jersey; William Hodgson; Robert Jones; Cameron Polak; Harry Shalamon; Isaac Dodds ^{[a]} Jack Allan ^{[a]}	1:33.54
4 × 100 m freestyle relay	Isle of Man; Alex Bregazzi; Ben Kebbell; Euan MacMurchie; Joel Watterson	3:24.38	Faroe Islands; Bartal Erlingsson Eidesgaard; Alvi Hjelm; Óli Mortensen; Rókur Trygvason	3:26.08	Guernsey; Jonathan Beck; Charlie-Joe Hallett; Thomas Hollingsworth; Thomas Teasdale	3:26.52
4 × 50 m medley relay	Isle of Man; Alex Bregazzi; Ben Kebbell; Euan MacMurchie; Joel Watterson	1:41.75	Guernsey; Jonathan Beck; Charlie-Joe Hallett; Thomas Hollingsworth; Thomas Teasdale	1:42.19	Jersey; William Hodgson; Robert Jones; Cameron Polak; Harry Shalamon	1:43.11
4 × 100 m medley relay	Jersey; William Hodgson; Robert Jones; Cameron Polak; Harry Shalamon	3:45.12	Isle of Man; Peter Allen; Alex Bregazzi; Ben Kebbell; Joel Watterson	3:45.37	Guernsey; Jonathan Beck; Charlie-Joe Hallett; Thomas Hollingsworth; Thomas Teasdale	3:46.33

=== Women ===
Event	Gold		Silver		Bronze	
50 m freestyle	Vár Erlingsdóttir Eidesgaard; Faroe Islands	26.11	Laura Kinley; Isle of Man	26.40	Olivia Marshall; Isle of Man	26.41
100 m freestyle	Olivia Weuro; Åland	56.25	Vár Erlingsdóttir Eidesgaard; Faroe Islands	56.48	Alison Jackson; Cayman Islands	57.09
200 m freestyle	Vár Erlingsdóttir Eidesgaard; Faroe Islands	2:00.74	Gemma Atherley; Jersey	2:01.60	Olivia Weuro; Åland	2:02.43
400 m freestyle	Vár Erlingsdóttir Eidesgaard; Faroe Islands	4:17.18	Gemma Atherley; Jersey	4:24.40	Isla Budge; Western Isles	4:26.11
800 m freestyle	Vár Erlingsdóttir Eidesgaard; Faroe Islands	9:03.62	Raya Embury-Brown; Cayman Islands	9:08.59	Orla Rabey; Guernsey	9:09.58
1500 m freestyle	Vár Erlingsdóttir Eidesgaard; Faroe Islands	16:47.54	Raya Embury-Brown; Cayman Islands	17:26.26	Lily Scott; Jersey	17:35.76
50 m backstroke	Tatiana Tostevin; Guernsey	29.12	Signhild Joensen; Faroe Islands	29.25	Meghan King; Isle of Wight	29.91
100 m backstroke	Signhild Joensen; Faroe Islands	1:01.58	Gemma Atherley; Jersey	1:02.16	Emma Hodgson; Isle of Man	1:03.94
200 m backstroke	Signhild Joensen; Faroe Islands	2:11.24	Gemma Atherley; Jersey	2:13.77	Tatiana Tostevin; Guernsey	2:18.09
50 m breaststroke	Kara Hanlon; Western Isles	31.08	Laura Kinley; Isle of Man	31.33	Jasmin Smith; Shetland	32.29
100 m breaststroke	Kara Hanlon; Western Isles	1:07.28	Laura Kinley; Isle of Man	1:09.70	Jasmin Smith; Shetland	1:11.18
200 m breaststroke	Kara Hanlon; Western Isles	2:25.45	Laura Kinley; Isle of Man	2:32.97	Anne Hutchison; Shetland	2:36.96
50 m butterfly	Olivia Marshall; Isle of Man	27.31	Mia McAllister; Orkney	27.89	Emmie Hutchison; Shetland	28.48
100 m butterfly	Olivia Marshall; Isle of Man	1:01.89	Orla Rabey; Guernsey	1:02.50	Olivia Weuro; Åland	1:03.62
200 m butterfly	Eve Goddard-Smith; Ynys Môn	2:23.19	Isabel Atherley; Jersey	2:27.68	Lauren Sandison; Shetland	2:28.55
100 m individual medley	Kara Hanlon; Western Isles	1:03.37	Abigail Lacey; Isle of Wight	1:04.84	Gemma Atherley; Jersey	1:05.16
200 m individual medley	Gemma Atherley; Jersey	2:18.15	Kara Hanlon; Western Isles	2:18.21	Abigail Lacey; Isle of Wight	2:18.51
400 m individual medley	Vár Erlingsdóttir Eidesgaard; Faroe Islands	4:50.89	Abigail Lacey; Isle of Wight	4:54.33	Rebekka Trygvadóttir; Faroe Islands	5:05.81
4 × 50 m freestyle relay	Isle of Man; Emma Hodgson; Laura Kinley; Olivia Marshall; Kiera Prentice	1:46.46	Guernsey; Courtney Butcher; Laura Le Cras; Orla Rabey; Tatiana Tostevin	1:46.78	Faroe Islands; Barbara Debes; Vár Erlingsdóttir Eidesgaard; Elisabeth Erlendsdóttir; Signhild Joensen	1:46.86
4 × 100 m freestyle relay	Cayman Islands; Jillian Crooks; Alison Jackson; Avery Lambert; Kyra Rabess	3:52.14	Guernsey; Courtney Butcher; Laura Le Cras; Orla Rabey; Tatiana Tostevin; Phillipa Gallagher ^{[a]}	3:52.44	Faroe Islands; Barbara Debes; Vár Erlingsdóttir Eidesgaard; Elisabeth Erlendsdóttir; Signhild Joensen; Rebekka Trygvadóttir ^{[a]}	3:53.58
4 × 50 m medley relay	Isle of Man; Emma Hodgson; Laura Kinley; Olivia Marshall; Kiera Prentice; Steph Brew ^{[a]} Blae Richardson ^{[a]}	1:55.51	Guernsey; Courtney Butcher; Laura Le Cras; Orla Rabey; Tatiana Tostevin; Molly Staples ^{[a]}	1:57.58	Faroe Islands; Barbara Debes; Vár Erlingsdóttir Eidesgaard; Signhild Joensen; Rebekka Trygvadóttir; Elisabeth Erlendsdóttir ^{[a]} Eyðrið Mortensen ^{[a]}	1:57.79
4 × 100 m medley relay	Isle of Man; Emma Hodgson; Laura Kinley; Olivia Marshall; Kiera Prentice; Steph Brew ^{[a]}	4:15.69	Guernsey; Courtney Butcher; Laura Le Cras; Orla Rabey; Tatiana Tostevin; Ailish Rabey ^{[a]}	4:15.81	Isle of Wight; Jessica Browne; Charlotte James; Meghan King; Abigail Lacey	4:25.30

=== Mixed ===
Event	Gold		Silver		Bronze	
4 × 50 m freestyle relay	Isle of Man; Alex Bregazzi; Laura Kinley; Olivia Marshall; Joel Watterson; Emma Hodgson ^{[a]} Euan MacMurchie ^{[a]}	1:37.74	Cayman Islands; Jordan Crooks; Alison Jackson; Cole Morgan; Kyra Rabess	1:38.41	Guernsey; Jonathan Beck; Courtney Butcher; Orla Rabey; Thomas Teasdale; William Russell ^{[a]} Tatiana Tostevin ^{[a]}	1:38.95

^{a} Swimmers who participated only in the heats and received medals.
