= Jordan Crooks =

Caymanian swimmer (born 2002)

Personal information
- National team: Cayman Islands
- Born: May 2, 2002 (age 24) George Town, Cayman Islands
- Height: 1.85 m (6 ft 1 in)
- Weight: 89 kg (196 lb)

Sport
- Sport: Swimming
- Strokes: Freestyle, butterfly, Backstroke
- Club: Cayman Islands Swimming Federation, Camana Bay Aquatic Club (former), Cayman Stingray Swim Club (former)
- College team: University of Tennessee
Medal record
Men's swimming
Representing Cayman Islands
World Championships (SC)
Gold medal – first place	2022 Melbourne	50 m freestyle
Gold medal – first place	2024 Budapest	50 m freestyle
Bronze medal – third place	2024 Budapest	100 m freestyle
Island Games
Gold medal – first place	2019 Gibraltar	100 m freestyle
Silver medal – second place	2019 Gibraltar	4 × 50 m mixed freestyle
Bronze medal – third place	2019 Gibraltar	50 m freestyle
Bronze medal – third place	2019 Gibraltar	50 m backstroke
Bronze medal – third place	2019 Gibraltar	100 m backstroke

Jordan Crooks (born 2 May 2002) is a Caymanian competitive swimmer who specialises in sprint freestyle events. He made history by winning the first medal of any colour—and the first gold medal—for the Cayman Islands at a world championships in any sport at the 2022 World Short Course Swimming Championships.

Crooks is a multiple-time world champion and world record holder and holds numerous national records for the Cayman Islands. He also holds the short course 50 meter freestyle world record. He is widely regarded as the most successful swimmer in the nation’s history.

== Career ==
Crooks qualified for the 2022 World Aquatics Championships in Budapest and the 2022 World Short Course Swimming Championships in Melbourne.

At the 2022 short course world championships, he won the gold medal in the men’s 50 metre freestyle, defeating defending champion Ben Proud.

At the 2024 World Short Course Swimming Championships in Budapest, Crooks successfully defended his world title in the 50 metre freestyle. In the semifinals, he set a new world record of 19.90 seconds, becoming the first swimmer to break the 20-second barrier in the event.

== Collegiate career ==
Crooks competes collegiately for the University of Tennessee. During his freshman season, he set school freshman records in the 50-yard freestyle (18.53 seconds) and the 100-yard freestyle (41.44 seconds).

On 21 February 2024, Crooks became the second man in history to swim under 18 seconds in the 50-yard freestyle at the SEC Championships, setting a pool record at Auburn University’s James E. Martin Aquatics Center.

== Olympic career ==
At the 2024 Summer Olympics in Paris, Crooks became the first Caymanian swimmer to qualify for an Olympic swimming final. He finished eighth in the men’s 50 metre freestyle final with a time of 21.64 seconds.

== Personal life ==
Crooks has a sister, Jillian Crooks, who also represents the Cayman Islands internationally in swimming.

Olympic Games
Preceded by Jillian Crooks; Brett Fraser	Flagbearer for Cayman Islands; Paris 2024 with Charlotte Webster	Succeeded by Incumbent
