= Jillian Crooks =

Caymanian swimmer (born 2006)

Personal information
- National team: Cayman Islands
- Born: Jillian Janis Geohagan Crooks; 27 June 2006 (age 20) Cayman Islands

Sport
- Sport: Swimming
- Strokes: Butterfly, freestyle
- Club: Total Swimmer Aquatics; Homer Mariners (former)
- Coach: Grant Fergusson; Caleb Miller
Medal record
Commonwealth Youth Games
| Gold medal – first place | 2023 Trinbago | 100m freestyle |
| Bronze medal – third place | 2023 Trinbago | 50m backstroke |
| Bronze medal – third place | 2023 Trinbago | 100m backstroke |
Island Games
| Gold medal – first place | 2019 Gibraltar | 4 × 100 m freestyle |

Jillian Janis Geohagan Crooks (born 27 June 2006) is a Caymanian competitive swimmer. She is the Cayman Islands record holder in the 50 metre butterfly and 100 metre freestyle. She competed in the 100 metre freestyle at the 2020 Summer Olympics, placing 41st in the prelims heats. She is the younger sister of the mens short course 50 m freestyle world record holder Jordan Crooks.

== Background ==
Following a brief residence in the United States state of Alaska in late 2021, she moved to Florida in 2022, where she trains with Total Swimmer Aquatics, and represents the Cayman Islands in international swimming competitions.

In 2022, Crooks committed to competing collegiately for the University of Tennessee swim team, the Tennessee Volunteers, starting in the autumn of 2024.

== Career ==
=== 2021 ===
==== 2020 Summer Olympics ====
At the 2020 Summer Olympics, held in 2021 due to the COVID-19 pandemic, in Tokyo, Japan, Crooks took 41st place in the 100 metre freestyle, not advancing to the semifinals with her Cayman Islands national record setting time of 57.32 seconds. She was the youngest competitor from the Cayman Islands at the 2020 Summer Olympics in any sport, as well as the youngest Olympian from the country across all previous editions of the modern Olympic Games her country competed at. Prior to the start of competition, Crooks served as one of two swimmers turned flag bearers for the Cayman Islands at the opening ceremony Parade of Nations, which made her one of 86 swimmers to carry the flag for their nation. Leading up to the 2020 Olympic Games, she was one of a number of swimmers to set the Cayman Islands records at the Cayman Islands qualifying meet for the Olympic Games held in Clermont, United States.

==== Competing in Alaska ====
Crooks was born and raised in the Cayman Islands. Following the 2020 Summer Olympics in 2021, she temporarily moved to the state of Alaska in the United States when she was just 15 years old to compete scholastically for Homer High School for one season. She moved to Homer, Alaska for a few months, including competing for the high school swim team, because she had a family friend who was a coach there and wanted to test out swimming in the United States, and Alaska specifically, to see if she could win a few state titles and set a few state records in the country, which she successfully did. She won two state titles and set state records in the 100 freestyle and 200 freestyle events. She was one of two Olympians to compete at the 2021 Alaska State High School Championship, the other being Alaska-born-and-raised Olympic gold medalist Lydia Jacoby who won breaststroke and individual medley events. Later in the month, she competed at the 2021 Junior Pan American Games in Cali, Colombia, placing tenth in the 100 metre backstroke, eleventh in the 50 metre freestyle, twelfth in the 100 metre freestyle, thirteenth in the 200 metre freestyle, and eighteenth in the 200 metre individual medley.

=== 2022 ===
At her first senior World Aquatics Championships, Crooks placed twenty-ninth in the 100 metre freestyle with a time of 57.24 seconds on day five of swimming competition at the 2022 World Aquatics Championships, held in June at Danube Arena in Budapest, Hungary. Two days later, she competed in the 50 metre freestyle for the first time at a World Championships, placing forty-first with a time of 26.75 seconds. Six months later, as a 16-year-old at the 2022 World Short Course Championships in December in Melbourne, Australia, she placed twenty-fourth in the 50 metre butterfly with a Cayman Islands record time of 26.40 seconds. The following day, she placed twenty-sixth in the 100 metre freestyle with a Cayman Islands record time of 54.20 seconds, which was 2.16 seconds behind first-ranked preliminaries swimmer Siobhán Haughey of Hong Kong.

== International championships (50 m) ==
| Meet | 50 freestyle | 100 freestyle | 200 freestyle | 100 backstroke | 200 medley |
|---|---|---|---|---|---|
Junior level
| PANJ 2021 | 11th | 12th | 13th | 10th | 18th (h) |
Senior level
| OG 2020 | | 41st | | | |
| WC 2022 | 41st | 29th | | | |

== International championships (25 m) ==
| Meet | 100 freestyle | 50 butterfly |
|---|---|---|
| WC 2022 | 26th | 24th |

== Personal best times ==
=== Long course metres (50 m pool) ===
As of 11 June 2023

| Event | Time | Meet | Location | Date | Age | Notes |
|---|---|---|---|---|---|---|
| 50 m freestyle | 25.87 | 2023 TYR Pro Swim Series - Mission Viejo | Mission Viejo, United States | 20 May 2023 | 16 | NR |
| 100 m freestyle | 56.30 | 2023 TYR Pro Swim Series - Mission Viejo | Mission Viejo, United States | 18 May 2023 | 16 | NR |
| 200 m freestyle | 2:03.67 | 2022 Futures Championships | Cary, United States | 27 July 2022 | 16 | NR |
| 50 m butterfly | 27.53 | 2023 TYR Pro Swim Series - Mission Viejo | Mission Viejo, United States | 19 May 2023 | 16 | NR |
| 100 m butterfly | 1:02.41 | 2023 TYR Pro Swim Series - Mission Viejo | Mission Viejo, United States | 20 May 2023 | 16 | NR, h |

Legend: NR – Cayman Islands record; e – equalled existing record;
Records not set in finals: h – heat; sf – semifinal; r – relay 1st leg; rh – relay heat 1st leg; b – B final; † – en route to final mark; so – swim-off; tt – time trial

=== Short course metres (25 m pool) ===
As of 3 January 2023

| Event | Time | | Meet | Location | Date | Age | Notes |
|---|---|---|---|---|---|---|---|
| 100 m freestyle | 54.20 | h | 2022 World Short Course Championships | Melbourne, Australia | 14 December 2022 | 16 | NR |
| 50 m butterfly | 26.40 | h | 2022 World Short Course Championships | Melbourne, Australia | 13 December 2022 | 16 | NR |

Legend: NR – Cayman Islands record; e – equalled existing record;
Records not set in finals: h – heat; sf – semifinal; r – relay 1st leg; rh – relay heat 1st leg; b – B final; † – en route to final mark; so – swim-off; tt – time trial

Olympic Games
| Preceded by Ronald Forbes | Flag bearer for Cayman Islands; Tokyo 2020 with Brett Fraser | Succeeded by Jordan Crooks; Charlotte Webster |
