= Geoffrey Butler (swimmer) =

Caymanian swimmer (born 1995)

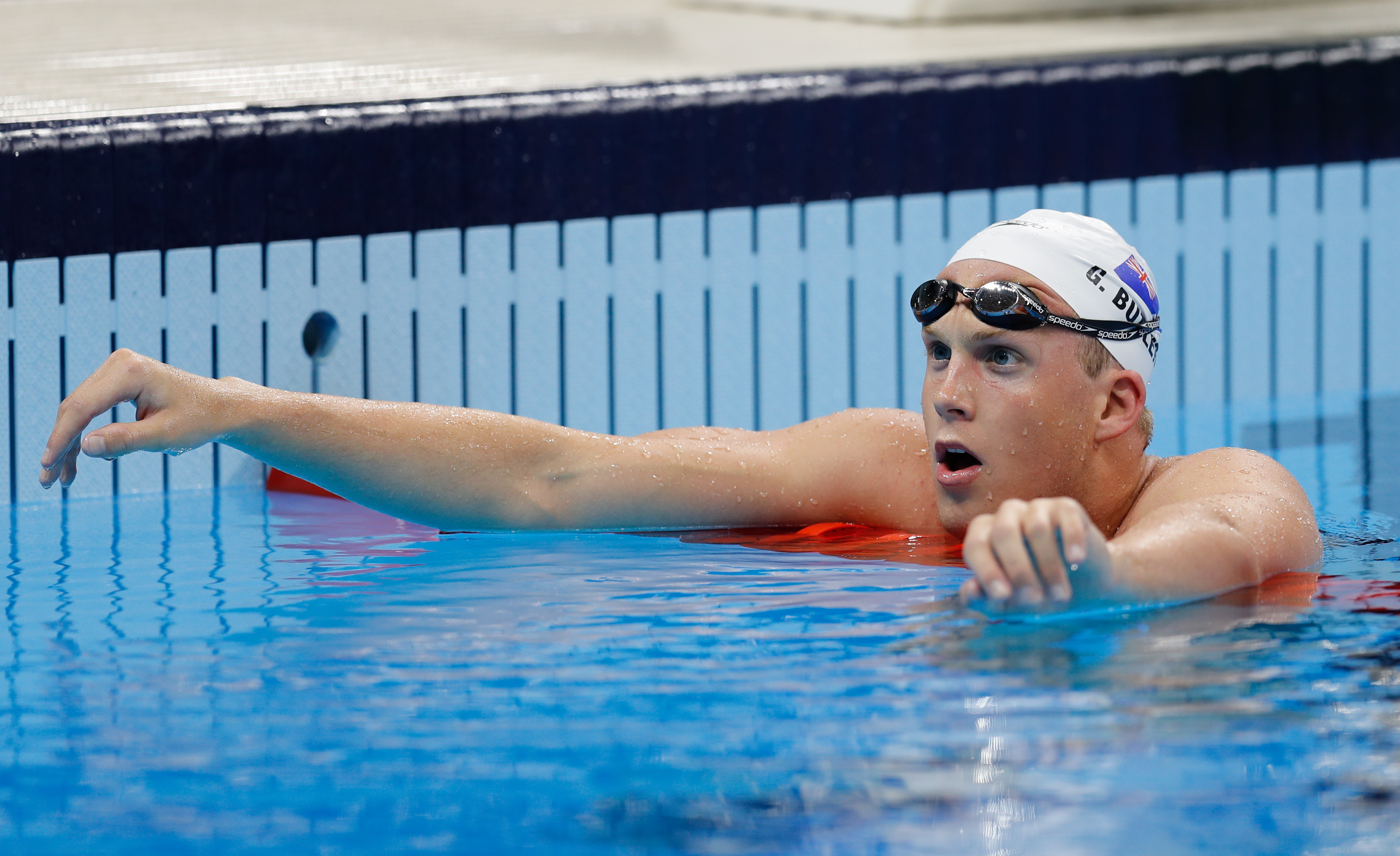
- Butler at the 2016 Olympics

Personal information
- Nickname: Geo
- Born: 7 December 1995 (age 30) George Town, Cayman Islands
- Height: 188 cm (6 ft 2 in)
- Weight: 105 kg (231 lb)

Sport
- Sport: Swimming
- Strokes: Freestyle

Geoffrey Butler (born 7 December 1995) is a freestyle swimmer from the Cayman Islands. Together with his sister Lara he competed at the 2014 and 2015 world championships and at the 2016 Summer Olympics. His best result was 41st place in the 1500 m in 2014.
