= Lara Butler =

Caymanian swimmer (born 1994)

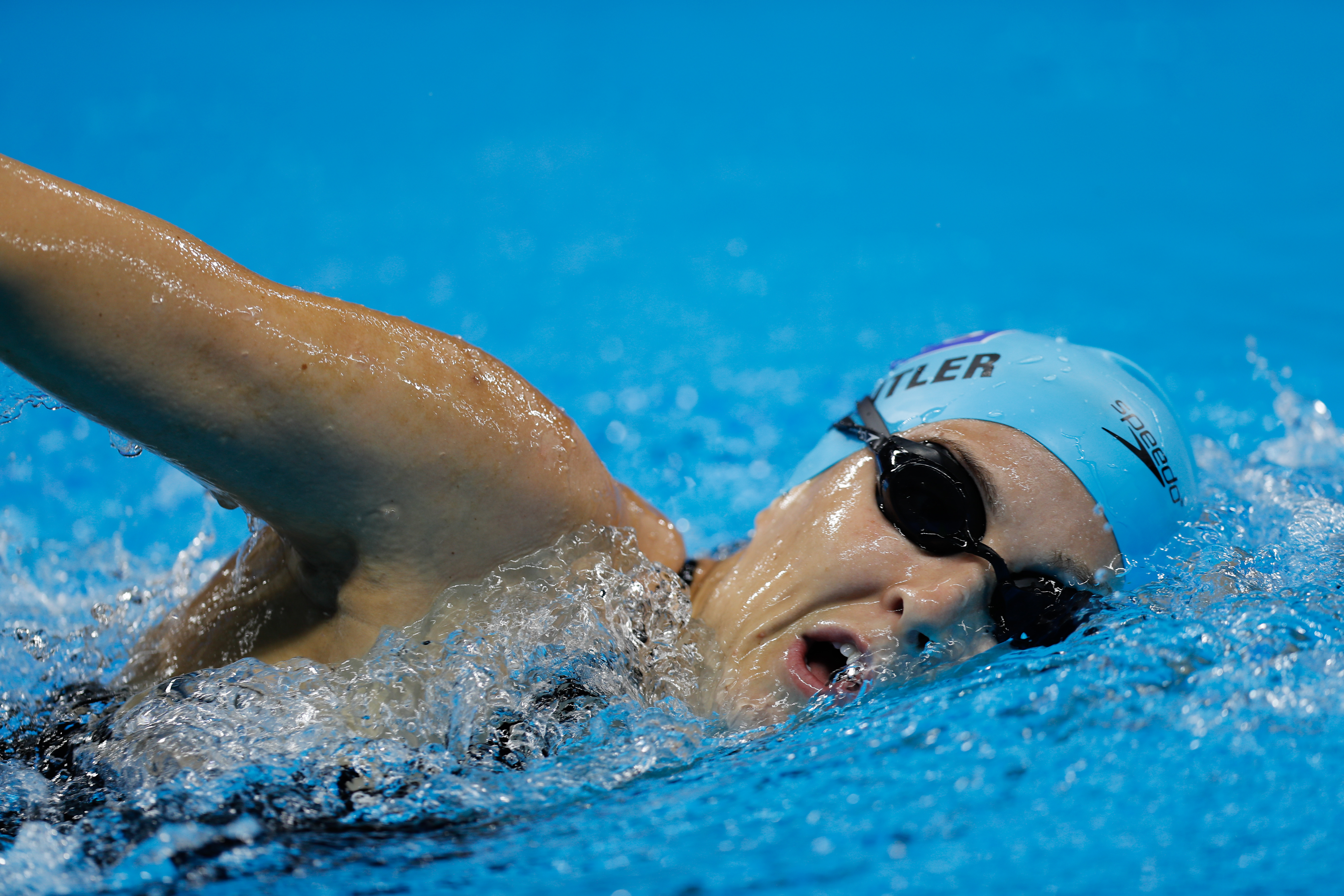
- Butler at the 2016 Olympics

Personal information
- Born: 2 October 1994 (age 31) George Town, Cayman Islands
- Height: 172 cm (5 ft 8 in)
- Weight: 60 kg (132 lb)

Sport
- Sport: Swimming
- Strokes: Backstroke, freestyle, butterfly, medley

Lara Butler (born 2 October 1994) is a swimmer from the Cayman Islands. Together with her brother Geoffrey she competed at the 2010, 2014 and 2015 world championships and at the 2016 Summer Olympics. Her best world championships result was 25th place in the individual 400 m medley in 2010.

== Life ==
Butler was born on October 2, 1994, and she is the eldest of three children. She learned to swim aged five and started competing aged ten. After a successful time at the 2015 Island Games she became the Cayman Islands Female Swimmer of the Year in 2015. She has also taken part in the Pan American Games and World Championships. Butler holds several Cayman Island swimming records.

In 2016, she was completing her course at Loughborough University and received first class honors. She competed in the Olympics at Rio for the Cayman Islands in the islands five-person team. She competed in the women's 100m backstroke where she was 29th in the heats and did not qualify for the semifinals. Butler was the flag bearer for the Cayman Islands during the closing ceremony.
