= Cayman Islands at the 2011 World Aquatics Championships =

Sporting event delegation

Flag of Cayman Islands

Cayman Islands competed at the 2011 World Aquatics Championships in Shanghai, China between July 16 and 31, 2011.

== Swimming ==
Cayman Islands qualified 2 swimmers.

Men

Athlete	Event	Heats		Semifinals		Final	
Athlete	Event	Time	Rank	Time	Rank	Time	Rank
Brett Fraser	Men's 50m Freestyle	22.65	25	did not advance			
Brett Fraser	Men's 100m Freestyle	48.98	17	did not advance			
Shaune Fraser	Men's 200m Freestyle	1:47.73	10 Q	1:48.46	14	did not advance	
Shaune Fraser	Men's 100m Butterfly	54.19	38	did not advance			
