= Swimming at the 2018 European Aquatics Championships – Women's 200 metre freestyle =

Women's 200 metre freestyle at the 2018 European Aquatics Championships
- Venue: Tollcross International Swimming Centre
- Dates: 5 August (heats and semifinals); 6 August (final)
- Competitors: 53 from 24 nations
- Winning time: 1:54.95

Medalists
gold medal	Charlotte Bonnet	France
silver medal	Femke Heemskerk	Netherlands
bronze medal	Anastasia Guzhenkova	Russia

The Women's 200 metre freestyle competition of the 2018 European Aquatics Championships was held on 5 and 6 August 2018.

== Records ==
Prior to the competition, the existing world and championship records were as follows.

	Name	Nation	Time	Location	Date
World record European record	Federica Pellegrini	Italy	1:52.98	Rome	29 July 2009
Championship record	Sarah Sjöström	Sweden	1:55.30	London	19 May 2016

The following new records were set during this competition.

Date	Event	Name	Nationality	Time	Record
6 August	Final	Charlotte Bonnet	France	1:54.95	CR

== Results ==
=== Heats ===
The heats were started on 5 August at 10:11.

Rank	Heat	Lane	Name	Nationality	Time	Notes
1	5	4	Femke Heemskerk	Netherlands	1:58.14	Q
2	6	4	Charlotte Bonnet	France	1:58.30	Q
3	4	6	Anastasia Guzhenkova	Russia	1:58.81	Q
4	4	5	Holly Hibbott	Great Britain	1:58.92	Q
5	4	7	Melani Costa	Spain	1:59.01	Q
6	5	2	Reva Foos	Germany	1:59.03	Q
7	4	4	Ellie Faulkner	Great Britain	1:59.19	Q
8	6	6	Kathryn Greenslade	Great Britain	1:59.26	
9	5	3	Isabel Gose	Germany	1:59.27	Q
10	5	6	Valentine Dumont	Belgium	1:59.30	Q
11	6	3	Margaux Fabre	France	1:59.32	Q
12	5	7	Maria Ugolkova	Switzerland	1:59.37	Q
13	4	3	Valeriya Salamatina	Russia	1:59.47	Q
14	5	5	Viktoriya Andreyeva	Russia	1:59.80	
15	2	2	Daniela Georges	Poland	1:59.87	Q
16	6	7	Robin Neumann	Netherlands	1:59.91	Q
17	6	2	Irina Krivonogova	Russia	2:00.12	
18	4	2	Annika Bruhn	Germany	2:00.22	
19	3	7	Lotte Goris	Belgium	2:00.34	Q
20	6	1	Marie Pietruschka	Germany	2:00.50	
21	3	6	Noémi Girardet	Switzerland	2:00.64	QSO
21	3	2	Janja Šegel	Slovenia	2:00.64	QSO
23	4	1	Signe Bro	Denmark	2:00.97	
24	6	0	Marjolein Delno	Netherlands	2:01.12	
24	5	9	Laura Jensen	Denmark	2:01.12	
26	5	1	Lucy Hope	Great Britain	2:01.54	
27	3	4	África Zamorano	Spain	2:01.64	
28	4	9	Hanna Eriksson	Sweden	2:01.66	
29	2	5	Aleksandra Polańska	Poland	2:01.92	
30	6	8	Stefania Pirozzi	Italy	2:01.95	
31	2	3	Marlene Kahler	Austria	2:02.02	
32	1	4	Lena Kreundl	Austria	2:02.10	
33	3	0	Dominika Kossakowska	Poland	2:02.69	
34	2	7	Emily Gantriis	Denmark	2:02.78	
35	2	4	Monique Olivier	Luxembourg	2:02.95	
36	1	6	Laura Benková	Slovakia	2:02.96	
37	4	8	Aleksandra Knop	Poland	2:02.99	
38	4	0	Loulou Vos	Netherlands	2:03.05	
39	5	0	Esther Morillo	Spain	2:03.09	
40	1	2	Kertu Alnek	Estonia	2:03.10	
41	3	1	Julia Hassler	Liechtenstein	2:03.11	
41	3	8	Diana Duares	Portugal	2:03.11	
43	2	1	Maria Grandt	Denmark	2:03.59	
43	3	3	Katja Fain	Slovenia	2:03.59	
45	3	5	Neža Klančar	Slovenia	2:03.67	
46	2	0	Ieva Maļuka	Latvia	2:03.71	
47	2	9	Lena Opatril	Austria	2:03.72	
48	2	8	Leoni Richter	Switzerland	2:03.83	
49	2	6	Selen Özbilen	Turkey	2:07.18	
50	1	5	Fatima Alkaramova	Azerbaijan	2:07.93	
51	1	3	Sara Lettoli	San Marino	2:08.12	
52	1	7	Elisa Bernardi	San Marino	2:10.82	
53	1	1	Nikol Merizaj	Albania	2:12.28	
—	3	9	Aleksa Gold	Estonia	Did not start	
—	6	9	Louise Hansson	Sweden	Did not start	

=== Swim-off ===
The swim-off was held on 5 August at 11:09.

Rank	Lane	Name	Nationality	Time	Notes
1	4	Janja Šegel	Slovenia	2:00.18	Q
2	5	Noémi Girardet	Switzerland	2:01.27	

=== Semifinals ===
The semifinals were started on 5 August at 18:36.

==== Semifinal 1 ====
Rank	Lane	Name	Nationality	Time	Notes
1	4	Charlotte Bonnet	France	1:58.12	Q
2	7	Valeriya Salamatina	Russia	1:58.37	Q
3	5	Holly Hibbott	Great Britain	1:58.46	Q
4	6	Isabel Gose	Germany	1:58.76	Q
5	3	Reva Foos	Germany	1:59.04	
6	2	Margaux Fabre	France	1:59.66	
7	1	Robin Neumann	Netherlands	2:00.39	
8	8	Janja Šegel	Slovenia	2:00.98	

==== Semifinal 2 ====
Rank	Lane	Name	Nationality	Time	Notes
1	4	Femke Heemskerk	Netherlands	1:57.64	Q
2	5	Anastasia Guzhenkova	Russia	1:58.18	Q
3	3	Melani Costa	Spain	1:58.53	Q
4	6	Ellie Faulkner	Great Britain	1:58.71	Q
5	2	Valentine Dumont	Belgium	1:58.89	
6	7	Maria Ugolkova	Switzerland	1:59.43	
7	1	Daniela Georges	Poland	2:00.43	
8	8	Lotte Goris	Belgium	2:00.69	

=== Final ===
The final was started on 6 August at 18:02.

Rank	Lane	Name	Nationality	Time	Notes
1st place, gold medalist(s)	5	Charlotte Bonnet	France	1:54.95	CR
2nd place, silver medalist(s)	4	Femke Heemskerk	Netherlands	1:56.72	
3rd place, bronze medalist(s)	3	Anastasia Guzhenkova	Russia	1:56.77	
4	1	Ellie Faulkner	Great Britain	1:58.26	
5	8	Isabel Gose	Germany	1:58.42	
6	6	Valeriya Salamatina	Russia	1:58.63	
7	2	Holly Hibbott	Great Britain	1:58.64	
8	7	Melani Costa	Spain	1:58.84	
