= 2018 FINA World Swimming Championships (25 m) – Women's 4 × 200 metre freestyle relay =

Women's 4 × 200 metre freestyle relay at the 2018 FINA World Swimming Championships (25 m)
- Venue: Hangzhou Sports Park Stadium
- Dates: 15 December (heats and final)
- Nations: 11
- Winning time: 7:34.08

Medalists
gold medal	Li Bingjie; Yang Junxuan; Zhang Yuhan; Wang Jianjiahe; Ai Yanhan; Liu Xiaohan	China
silver medal	Leah Smith; Mallory Comerford; Melanie Margalis; Erika Brown; Lia Neal; Veronica Burchill	United States
bronze medal	Ariarne Titmus; Minna Atherton; Carla Buchanan; Abbey Harkin	Australia

The Women's 4 × 200 metre freestyle relay competition of the 2018 FINA World Swimming Championships (25 m) was held on 15 December 2018.

== Records ==
Prior to the competition, the existing world and championship records were as follows.

	Nation	Time	Location	Date
World record Championship record	Netherlands	7:32.85	Doha	3 December 2014

== Results ==
=== Heats ===
The heats were started on 15 December at 11:51.

Rank	Heat	Lane	Nation	Swimmers	Time	Notes
1	2	3	Australia	Carla Buchanan (1:56.37); Minna Atherton (1:55.08); Abbey Harkin (1:55.74); Ariarne Titmus (1:53.53)	7:40.72	Q
2	2	5	Russia	Anastasia Guzhenkova (1:55.08); Irina Krivonogova (1:56.76); Daria Mullakaeva (1:54.39); Valeriya Salamatina (1:55.01)	7:41.24	Q
3	1	4	United States	Lia Neal (1:56.67); Veronica Burchill (1:57.02); Erika Brown (1:55.32); Leah Smith (1:55.63)	7:44.64	Q
4	1	3	Italy	Margherita Panziera (1:56.78); Erica Musso (1:56.13); Federica Pellegrini (1:54.09); Simona Quadarella (1:57.82)	7:44.82	Q
5	2	4	China	Ai Yanhan (1:57.90); Zhang Yuhan (1:54.14); Liu Xiaohan (1:55.46); Li Bingjie (1:57.72)	7:45.22	Q
6	1	5	Japan	Tomomi Aoki (1:56.88); Chihiro Igarashi (1:55.93); Mayuko Goto (1:57.39); Rika Omoto (1:56.43)	7:46.63	Q
7	1	2	Germany	Annika Bruhn (1:55.82); Reva Foos (1:56.12); Marie Pietruschka (1:56.48); Sarah Köhler (1:58.91)	7:47.33	Q
8	2	2	Austria	Marlene Kahler (1:58.02); Lena Kreundl (1:57.28); Cornelia Pammer (1:59.49); Claudia Hufnagl (2:00.29)	7:55.08	Q
9	2	6	Hong Kong	Sze Hang Yu (1:59.16); Kan Cheuk Tung Natalie (2:02.56); Chan Kin Lok (2:00.64); Ho Nam Wai (1:58.88)	8:01.24	Q
10	2	7	New Zealand	Hayley McIntosh (2:02.65); Paige Flynn (2:00.87); Emma Godwin (1:59.39); Caitlin Deans (1:58.35)	8:01.26	
11	1	6	Slovakia	Laura Benková (1:59.74); Tamara Potocká (2:02.60); Sára Niepelová (2:03.79); Sabína Kupčová (2:04.72)	8:10.85	

=== Final ===
The final was held on 15 December at 20:50.

Rank	Lane	Nation	Swimmers	Time	Notes
1st place, gold medalist(s)	2	China	Li Bingjie (1:54.56); Yang Junxuan (1:53.06); Zhang Yuhan (1:53.94); Wang Jianjiahe (1:52.52)	7:34.08	AS
2nd place, silver medalist(s)	3	United States	Leah Smith (1:55.85); Mallory Comerford (1:53.00); Melanie Margalis (1:53.59); Erika Brown (1:52.86)	7:35.30	NR
3rd place, bronze medalist(s)	4	Australia	Ariarne Titmus (1:52.22); Minna Atherton (1:54.73); Carla Buchanan (1:54.82); Abbey Harkin (1:54.63)	7:36.40	OC
4	5	Russia	Anna Egorova (1:54.18); Daria Mullakaeva (1:55.22); Anastasia Guzhenkova (1:53.94); Veronika Andrusenko (1:53.30)	7:36.64	NR
5	7	Japan	Tomomi Aoki (1:55.04); Chihiro Igarashi (1:54.89); Mayuko Goto (1:56.76); Rika Omoto (1:56.28)	7:42.97	
6	6	Italy	Margherita Panziera (1:56.71); Erica Musso (1:56.65); Federica Pellegrini (1:52.66); Simona Quadarella (1:57.16)	7:43.18	
7	1	Germany	Annika Bruhn (1:56.30); Marie Pietruschka (1:55.99); Laura Riedemann (1:57.03); Reva Foos (1:57.04)	7:46.36	
8	8	Austria	Marlene Kahler (1:58.80); Lena Kreundl (1:57.20); Cornelia Pammer (1:59.01); Claudia Hufnagl (2:00.92)	7:55.93	
