= Swimming at the 2018 European Aquatics Championships – Women's 4 × 100 metre freestyle relay =

Women's 4 × 100 metre freestyle relay at the 2018 European Aquatics Championships
- Venue: Tollcross International Swimming Centre
- Dates: 3 August
- Competitors: 58 from 13 nations
- Teams: 13
- Winning time: 3:34.65

Medalists
gold medal	Marie Wattel; Charlotte Bonnet; Margaux Fabre; Béryl Gastaldello; Anouchka Martin; Assia Touati	France
silver medal	Kim Busch; Femke Heemskerk; Kira Toussaint; Ranomi Kromowidjojo; Marjolein Delno	Netherlands
bronze medal	Pernille Blume; Signe Bro; Julie Kepp Jensen; Mie Nielsen; Emily Gantriis	Denmark

The Women's 4 × 100 metre freestyle relay competition of the 2018 European Aquatics Championships was held on 3 August 2018.

== Records ==
Before the competition, the existing world and championship records were as follows.

	Team	Time	Location	Date
World record	Australia	3:30.05	Gold Coast	5 April 2018
European record	Netherlands	3:31.72	Rome	26 July 2009
Championship record	Netherlands	3:33.62	Eindhoven	18 March 2008

== Results ==
=== Heats ===
The heats were held at 11:01.

Rank	Heat	Lane	Nation	Swimmers	Time	Notes
1	2	6	Netherlands	Kim Busch (55.42); Kira Toussaint (54.93); Marjolein Delno (55.17); Femke Heemskerk (52.78)	3:38.30	Q
2	2	3	Italy	Giada Galizi (55.37); Federica Pellegrini (53.73); Laura Letrari (54.65); Erika Ferraioli (54.89)	3:38.64	Q
3	1	3	France	Béryl Gastaldello (54.70); Margaux Fabre (54.55); Anouchka Martin (55.33); Assia Touati (54.55)	3:39.13	Q
4	2	5	Russia	Arina Openysheva (54.90); Rozaliya Nasretdinova (54.91); Valeriya Salamatina (54.87); Viktoriya Andreyeva (54.80)	3:39.48	Q
5	1	5	Switzerland	Maria Ugolkova (54.81); Alexandra Touretski (55.29); Nina Kost (55.01); Noémi Girardet (54.89)	3:40.00	Q
6	1	7	Germany	Annika Bruhn (54.69); Reva Foos (54.53); Johanna Roas (54.99); Marie Pietruschka (55.84)	3:40.05	Q
7	2	4	Great Britain	Lucy Hope (56.61); Anna Hopkin (54.55); Ellie Faulkner (55.46); Freya Anderson (53.56)	3:40.18	Q
8	1	6	Denmark	Mie Nielsen (55.44); Julie Kepp Jensen (55.29); Emily Gantriis (55.96); Signe Bro (54.59)	3:41.28	Q
8	2	1	Poland	Katarzyna Wasick (55.18); Alicja Tchórz (55.09); Aleksandra Polańska (55.74); Anna Dowgiert (55.27)	3:41.28	Q
10	2	2	Sweden	Louise Hansson (55.57); Ida Lindborg (55.73); Sara Junevik (56.49); Magdalena Kuras (55.38)	3:43.17	
11	1	1	Israel	Andrea Murez (55.12); Anastasia Gorbenko (55.25); Amit Ivry (57.33); Lea Polonsky (57.89)	3:45.59	
12	2	7	Turkey	Ekaterina Avramova (56.24); Selen Özbilen (56.43); Sezin Eligül (57.21); Zehra Duru Bilgin (58.56)	3:48.44	
13	1	2	Estonia	Kertu Ly Alnek (56.73); Kertu Kaare (58.61); Margaret Markvardt (57.78); Aleksa Gold (56.55)	3:49.67	

=== Final ===
The final was held at 18:01.

Rank	Lane	Nation	Swimmers	Time	Notes
1st place, gold medalist(s)	3	France	Marie Wattel (54.35); Charlotte Bonnet (52.20); Margaux Fabre (54.41); Béryl Gastaldello (53.69)	3:34.65	
2nd place, silver medalist(s)	4	Netherlands	Kim Busch (54.75); Femke Heemskerk (52.33); Kira Toussaint (54.47); Ranomi Kromowidjojo (53.22)	3:34.77	
3rd place, bronze medalist(s)	0	Denmark	Pernille Blume (52.83); Signe Bro (54.59); Julie Kepp Jensen (55.19); Mie Nielsen (54.42)	3:37.03	NR
4	1	Great Britain	Anna Hopkin (54.94); Siobhan-Marie O'Connor (54.15); Ellie Faulkner (54.95); Freya Anderson (53.22)	3:37.26	
5	5	Italy	Giada Galizi (54.92); Erika Ferraioli (54.76); Laura Letrari (54.84); Federica Pellegrini (53.59)	3:38.11	
6	6	Russia	Maria Kameneva (54.19); Arina Openysheva (54.60); Valeriya Salamatina (55.08); Viktoriya Andreyeva (54.78)	3:38.65	
7	2	Switzerland	Maria Ugolkova (54.86); Alexandra Touretski (54.64); Nina Kost (54.42); Noémi Girardet (54.93)	3:38.85	
8	7	Germany	Annika Bruhn (54.57); Reva Foos (54.83); Johanna Roas (54.93); Marie Pietruschka (55.04)	3:39.37	
9	8	Poland	Katarzyna Wasick (54.91); Alicja Tchórz (55.53); Aleksandra Polańska (55.60); Anna Dowgiert (54.90)	3:40.94	
