= Swimming at the 2018 European Aquatics Championships – Women's 4 × 200 metre freestyle relay =

Milan 2018

Women's 4 × 200 metre freestyle relay at the 2018 European Aquatics Championships
- Venue: Tollcross International Swimming Centre
- Dates: 7 August
- Competitors: 53 from 12 nations
- Teams: 12
- Winning time: 7:51.65

Medalists
gold medal	Ellie Faulkner; Kathryn Greenslade; Holly Hibbott; Freya Anderson; Lucy Hope	Great Britain
silver medal	Valeriya Salamatina; Anna Egorova; Arina Openysheva; Irina Krivonogova; Anastasia Guzhenkova	Russia
bronze medal	Reva Foos; Isabel Marie Gose; Sarah Köhler; Annika Bruhn; Marie Pietruschka	Germany

The Women's 4 × 200 metre freestyle relay competition of the 2018 European Aquatics Championships was held on 7 August 2018.

== Records ==
Prior to the competition, the existing world and championship records were as follows.

	Team	Time	Location	Date
World record	China	7:42.08	Rome	30 July 2009
European record	Great Britain	7:45.51	Rome	30 July 2009
Championship record	Italy	7:50.53	Berlin	21 August 2014

== Results ==
=== Heats ===
The heats were started at 10:00.

Rank	Heat	Lane	Nation	Swimmers	Time	Notes
1	2	2	Russia	Anna Egorova (1:58.98); Valeriya Salamatina (1:59.43); Irina Krivonogova (2:00.35); Arina Openysheva (1:59.14)	7:57.90	Q
2	1	3	Great Britain	Kathryn Greenslade (1:59.33); Ellie Faulkner (1:58.89); Lucy Hope (2:01.47); Holly Hibbott (2:01.09)	8:00.78	Q
3	2	7	Germany	Reva Foos (1:58.99); Marie Pietruschka (2:00.53); Isabel Marie Gose (2:00.60); Annika Bruhn (2:01.83)	8:01.95	Q
4	1	2	France	Margaux Fabre (2:00.20); Assia Touati (1:59.77); Alizée Morel (2:00.28); Marie Wattel (2:03.28)	8:03.53	Q
5	1	4	Spain	Melani Costa (2:00.08); Lidón Muñoz (2:01.99); Esther Morillo (2:01.55); África Zamorano (2:00.75)	8:04.37	Q
6	2	1	Denmark	Laura Glerup Jensen (2:00.78); Emily Gantriis (2:00.84); Maria Grandt (2:03.08); Helena Rosendahl Bach (1:59.93)	8:04.63	Q
7	1	5	Poland	Daniela Georges (2:02.05); Dominika Kossakowska (2:00.82); Aleksandra Knop (2:02.04); Aleksandra Polańska (2:00.90)	8:05.81	Q
8	2	8	Netherlands	Robin Neumann (2:00.56); Esmee Vermeulen (2:00.92); Loulou Vos (2:03.13); Marjolein Delno (2:01.22)	8:05.83	Q
9	2	3	Belgium	Valentine Dumont (1:59.62); Juliette Dumont (2:03.65); Lotte Goris (2:00.81); Camille Bouden (2:04.51)	8:08.59	
10	2	5	Austria	Marlene Kahler (2:02.84); Lena Kreundl (2:01.80); Lena Opatril (2:02.89); Cornelia Pammer (2:03.41)	8:10.94	
11	2	4	Slovenia	Janja Šegel (2:03.53); Katja Fain (2:03.25); Neža Klančar (2:04.68); Sara Račnik (2:03.50)	8:14.96	
12	1	7	San Marino	Sara Lettoli (2:10.53); Elisa Bernardi (2:11.92); Beatrice Felici (2:17.50); Arianna Valloni (2:11.50)	8:51.45	
	1	1	Hungary	Did not start		
	1	6	Switzerland	Did not start		
	2	6	Italy	Did not start		

=== Final ===
The final was started at 17:49.

Rank	Lane	Nation	Swimmers	Time	Notes
1st place, gold medalist(s)	5	Great Britain	Ellie Faulkner (1:59.25); Kathryn Greenslade (1:57.94); Holly Hibbott (1:58.46); Freya Anderson (1:56.00)	7:51.65	
2nd place, silver medalist(s)	4	Russia	Valeriya Salamatina (1:58.72); Anna Egorova (1:58.18); Arina Openysheva (1:58.48); Anastasia Guzhenkova (1:57.49)	7:52.87	
3rd place, bronze medalist(s)	3	Germany	Reva Foos (1:58.90); Isabel Marie Gose (1:58.22); Sarah Köhler (1:58.99); Annika Bruhn (1:57.65)	7:53.76	
4	6	France	Marie Wattel (1:59.72); Charlotte Bonnet (1:56.23); Margaux Fabre (1:58.67); Assia Touati (1:59.24)	7:53.86	
5	2	Spain	Melani Costa (1:58.55); África Zamorano (2:00.85); Esther Morillo (2:01.17); Lidón Muñoz (2:01.47)	8:02.04	
6	8	Netherlands	Robin Neumann (2:00.65); Esmee Vermeulen (2:01.10); Loulou Vos (2:00.52); Marjolein Delno (2:00.67)	8:02.94	
7	7	Denmark	Laura Glerup Jensen (2:00.27); Signe Bro (2:03.25); Emily Gantriis (2:00.48); Helena Rosendahl Bach (2:00.43)	8:04.43	
8	1	Poland	Daniela Georges (2:01.92); Dominika Kossakowska (2:00.98); Aleksandra Knop (2:01.29); Aleksandra Polańska (2:00.32)	8:04.51	
