= Swimming at the 2018 European Aquatics Championships – Mixed 4 × 200 metre freestyle relay =

Mixed 4 × 200 metre freestyle relay at the 2018 European Aquatics Championships
- Venue: Tollcross International Swimming Centre
- Dates: 4 August
- Competitors: 52 from 9 nations
- Teams: 9
- Winning time: 7:28.43

Medalists
gold medal	Jacob Heidtmann; Henning Mühlleitner; Reva Foos; Annika Bruhn; Marius Zobel; Isabel Marie Gose	Germany
silver medal	Mikhail Vekovishchev; Mikhail Dovgalyuk; Valeriya Salamatina; Viktoriya Andreyeva; Martin Malyutin; Viacheslav Andrusenko; Irina Krivonogova; Anastasia Guzhenkova	Russia
bronze medal	Stephen Milne; Craig McLean; Kathryn Greenslade; Freya Anderson; Cameron Kurle; Holly Hibbott	Great Britain

The Mixed 4 × 200 metre freestyle relay competition of the 2018 European Aquatics Championships was held on 4 August 2018.

== Results ==
=== Heats ===
The heats were started at 10:30.

Rank	Heat	Lane	Nation	Swimmers	Time	Notes
1	1	7	Russia	Martin Malyutin (1:47.46); Viacheslav Andrusenko (1:47.58); Irina Krivonogova (1:59.13); Anastasia Guzhenkova (1:58.99)	7:33.16	Q
2	1	5	Great Britain	Cameron Kurle (1:49.05); Craig McLean (1:48.50); Kathryn Greenslade (1:57.26); Holly Hibbott (1:59.68)	7:34.49	Q
3	2	6	Germany	Jacob Heidtmann (1:46.81); Marius Zobel (1:49.46); Reva Foos (1:58.48); Isabel Marie Gose (2:00.41)	7:35.16	Q
4	2	7	Italy	Alessio Proietti Colonna (1:48.09); Matteo Ciampi (1:47.92); Stefania Pirozzi (2:02.03); Margherita Panziera (1:59.46)	7:37.50	Q
5	1	2	Netherlands	Dion Dreesens (1:49.57); Maarten Brzoskowski (1:49.09); Marjolein Delno (2:01.29); Robin Neumann (1:59.35)	7:39.30	Q
6	1	3	Israel	Daniel Namir (1:49.58); Denis Loktev (1:49.33); Anastasia Gorbenko (2:03.04); Andrea Murez (2:00.37)	7:42.32	Q
7	2	5	Hungary	Balázs Holló (1:50.19); Benjámin Grátz (1:49.85); Zsuzsanna Jakabos (2:01.68); Evelyn Verrasztó (2:02.74)	7:44.46	Q
8	1	4	Slovakia	Adam Halas (1:57.53); Richard Nagy (1:51.94); Nikoleta Trníková (2:11.95); Laura Benková (2:03.16)	8:04.58	Q
9	2	4	San Marino	Cristian Santi (1:58.98); Gianluca Pasolini (2:01.25); Elisa Bernardi (2:10.29); Arianna Valloni (2:10.79)	8:21.31	
—	2	2	Sweden	Did not start		
—	2	3	Estonia	Did not start		

=== Final ===
The final was held at 18:28.

Rank	Lane	Nation	Swimmers	Time	Notes
1st place, gold medalist(s)	3	Germany	Jacob Heidtmann (1:46.52); Henning Mühlleitner (1:47.32); Reva Foos (1:58.25); Annika Bruhn (1:56.34)	7:28.43	CR
2nd place, silver medalist(s)	4	Russia	Mikhail Vekovishchev (1:47.10); Mikhail Dovgalyuk (1:47.37); Valeriya Salamatina (1:56.18); Viktoriya Andreyeva (1:58.72)	7:29.37	
3rd place, bronze medalist(s)	5	Great Britain	Stephen Milne (1:47.77); Craig McLean (1:48.34); Kathryn Greenslade (1:57.81); Freya Anderson (1:55.80)	7:29.72	
4	1	Hungary	Kristóf Milák (1:48.04); Nándor Németh (1:46.90); Katinka Hosszú (1:57.31); Zsuzsanna Jakabos (1:58.94)	7:31.19	
5	6	Italy	Filippo Megli (1:47.48); Alessio Proietti Colonna (1:48.37); Federica Pellegrini (1:56.76); Margherita Panziera (1:59.76)	7:32.37	
6	2	Netherlands	Kyle Stolk (1:48.64); Stan Pijnenburg (1:47.79); Femke Heemskerk (1:56.13); Robin Neumann (1:59.83)	7:32.39	
7	7	Israel	Denis Loktev (1:47.87); Daniel Namir (1:48.71); Anastasia Gorbenko (2:02.47); Andrea Murez (2:01.02)	7:40.07	
8	8	Slovakia	Richard Nagy (1:52.65); Adam Halas (1:56.77); Nikoleta Trníková (2:10.24); Laura Benková (2:03.84)	8:03.50	
