= Swimming at the 2019 World Aquatics Championships – Women's 4 × 200 metre freestyle relay =

Women's 4 × 200 metre freestyle relay at the 2019 World Aquatics Championships
- Venue: Nambu University Municipal Aquatics Center
- Location: Gwangju, South Korea
- Dates: 25 July (heats and final)
- Competitors: 66 from 14 nations
- Teams: 14
- Winning time: 7:41.50 WR

Medalists
gold medal	Ariarne Titmus; Madison Wilson; Brianna Throssell; Emma McKeon; Leah Neale; Kiah Melverton	Australia
silver medal	Simone Manuel; Katie Ledecky; Melanie Margalis; Katie McLaughlin; Allison Schmitt; Gabby DeLoof; Leah Smith	United States
bronze medal	Kayla Sanchez; Taylor Ruck; Emily Overholt; Penny Oleksiak; Rebecca Smith; Emma O'Croinin	Canada

The Women's 4 × 200 metre freestyle relay competition at the 2019 World Championships was held on 25 July 2019.

== Records ==
Prior to the competition, the existing world and championship records were as follows.

World record	China	7:42.08	Rome, Italy	30 July 2009
Competition record	China	7:42.08	Rome, Italy	30 July 2009

The following new records were set during this competition.

Date	Event	Name	Nationality	Time	Record
25 July	Final	Ariarne Titmus (1:54.27); Madison Wilson (1:56.73); Brianna Throssell (1:55.60); Emma McKeon (1:54.90)	Australia	7:41.50	WR

== Results ==
=== Heats ===
The heats were held on 25 July at 11:31.

Rank	Heat	Lane	Nation	Swimmers	Time	Notes
1	2	4	Australia	Leah Neale (1:58.30); Madison Wilson (1:56.46); Brianna Throssell (1:56.70); Kiah Melverton (1:59.18)	7:50.64	Q
2	1	4	United States	Allison Schmitt (1:59.37); Gabby DeLoof (1:58.35); Melanie Margalis (1:56.37); Leah Smith (1:57.49)	7:51.58	Q
3	1	3	Russia	Anastasia Guzhenkova (1:59.04); Valeriya Salamatina (1:57.54); Daria Mullakaeva (1:58.74); Veronika Andrusenko (1:57.34)	7:52.66	Q
4	1	5	China	Ai Yanhan (1:58.83); Dong Jie (1:59.72); Zhang Yuhan (1:57.16); Li Bingjie (1:58.39)	7:54.10	Q
5	2	6	Germany	Reva Foos (1:58.81); Isabel Marie Gose (1:57.51); Marie Pietruschka (1:59.23); Annika Bruhn (1:58.75)	7:54.30	Q
6	2	5	Canada	Kayla Sanchez (1:58.88); Emily Overholt (1:57.11); Rebecca Smith (1:58.74); Emma O'Croinin (2:00.37)	7:55.10	Q
7	1	6	Hungary	Ajna Késely (1:58.82); Evelyn Verrasztó (2:00.37); Zsuzsanna Jakabos (1:59.60); Katinka Hosszú (1:56.61)	7:55.40	Q
8	2	3	Japan	Rio Shirai (1:59.68); Chihiro Igarashi (1:59.17); Tomomi Aoki (1:58.17); Nagisa Ikemoto (1:58.98)	7:56.00	Q
9	2	2	Poland	Aleksandra Polańska (1:59.80); Dominika Kossakowska (2:00.76); Marta Klimek (2:00.13); Aleksandra Knop (2:01.01)	8:01.70	
10	2	1	New Zealand	Erika Fairweather (1:58.84); Carina Doyle (2:00.92); Chelsey Edwards (2:01.88); Eve Thomas (2:01.64)	8:03.28	
11	1	2	Hong Kong	Camille Cheng (2:02.32); Siobhán Haughey (1:56.84); Ho Nam Wai (2:03.19); Stephanie Au (2:02.63)	8:04.98	
12	2	7	South Korea	Choi Jung-min (2:02.21); Jung Hyun-young (2:02.10); Park Na-ri (2:01.89); Jo Hyun-ju (2:02.18)	8:08.38	
13	1	7	Singapore	Quah Ting Wen (2:00.28); Gan Ching Hwee (2:02.80); Christie Chue (2:04.08); Quah Jing Wen (2:01.28)	8:08.44	NR
14	1	1	Portugal	Diana Durães (2:04.31); Tamila Holub (2:03.95); Ana Monteiro (2:10.93); Victoria Kaminskaya (2:10.80)	8:29.99	

=== Final ===
The final was held on 25 July at 21:47.

Rank	Lane	Nation	Swimmers	Time	Notes
1st place, gold medalist(s)	4	Australia	Ariarne Titmus (1:54.27) OC; Madison Wilson (1:56.73); Brianna Throssell (1:55.60); Emma McKeon (1:54.90)	7:41.50	WR
2nd place, silver medalist(s)	5	United States	Simone Manuel (1:56.09); Katie Ledecky (1:54.61); Melanie Margalis (1:55.81); Katie McLaughlin (1:55.36)	7:41.87	AM
3rd place, bronze medalist(s)	7	Canada	Kayla Sanchez (1:57.32); Taylor Ruck (1:56.41); Emily Overholt (1:56.26); Penny Oleksiak (1:54.36)	7:44.35	NR
4	6	China	Yang Junxuan (1:56.41); Wang Jianjiahe (1:56.52); Li Bingjie (1:56.29); Zhang Yuhan (1:57.00)	7:46.22	
5	3	Russia	Anna Egorova (1:58.19); Anastasia Guzhenkova (1:56.43); Valeriya Salamatina (1:56.93); Veronika Andrusenko (1:56.70)	7:48.25	NR
6	1	Hungary	Ajna Késely (1:59.60); Evelyn Verrasztó (1:59.74); Zsuzsanna Jakabos (1:57.63); Katinka Hosszú (1:57.60)	7:54.57	
7	2	Germany	Reva Foos (1:59.81); Isabel Marie Gose (1:57.99); Marie Pietruschka (1:59.04); Annika Bruhn (1:58.79)	7:55.63	
8	8	Japan	Rio Shirai (1:59.88); Chihiro Igarashi (1:58.81); Tomomi Aoki (1:58.32); Nagisa Ikemoto (1:59.30)	7:56.31	
