= 2018 FINA World Swimming Championships (25 m) – Women's 200 metre freestyle =

Women's 200 metre freestyle at the 2018 FINA World Swimming Championships (25 m)
- Venue: Hangzhou Sports Park Stadium
- Dates: 11 December (heats and final)
- Competitors: 56 from 48 nations
- Winning time: 1:51.38

Medalists
gold medal	Ariarne Titmus	Australia
silver medal	Mallory Comerford	United States
bronze medal	Femke Heemskerk	Netherlands

The women's 200 metre freestyle competition of the 2018 FINA World Swimming Championships (25 m) was held on 11 December 2018.

== Records ==
Prior to the competition, the existing world and championship records were as follows.

	Name	Nation	Time	Location	Date
World record	Sarah Sjöström	Sweden	1:50.43	Eindhoven	12 August 2017
Championship record	Sarah Sjöström	Sweden	1:50.78	Doha	7 December 2014

== Results ==
=== Heats ===
The heats were started at 09:59.

Rank	Heat	Lane	Name	Nationality	Time	Notes
1	4	1	Mallory Comerford	United States	1:52.52	Q, NR
2	4	5	Ariarne Titmus	Australia	1:52.66	Q
3	5	5	Veronika Andrusenko	Russia	1:54.11	Q
4	5	4	Femke Heemskerk	Netherlands	1:54.16	Q
5	5	3	Michelle Coleman	Sweden	1:54.22	Q
6	6	4	Federica Pellegrini	Italy	1:54.46	Q
7	4	4	Wang Jianjiahe	China	1:54.63	Q
8	6	3	Barbora Seemanová	Czech Republic	1:54.82	Q
9	6	2	Manuella Lyrio	Brazil	1:54.87	
9	6	5	Yang Junxuan	China	1:54.87	
11	6	6	Larissa Oliveira	Brazil	1:54.88	
12	5	2	Chihiro Igarashi	Japan	1:55.21	
13	4	0	Annika Bruhn	Germany	1:55.31	
14	4	3	Anastasia Guzhenkova	Russia	1:55.44	
15	4	2	Leah Smith	United States	1:55.52	
16	5	6	Tomomi Aoki	Japan	1:55.60	
17	4	6	Carla Buchanan	Australia	1:55.64	
18	5	1	Katja Fain	Slovenia	1:56.71	
19	5	7	Erica Musso	Italy	1:56.85	
20	6	7	Reva Foos	Germany	1:56.91	
21	4	8	Elisbet Gámez Matos	Cuba	1:58.37	
22	6	1	Marlene Kahler	Austria	1:58.65	
23	6	0	Diana Durães	Portugal	1:59.30	
24	6	8	Boglárka Kapás	Hungary	1:59.41	
25	6	9	Laura Benková	Slovakia	1:59.87	
26	5	0	Paige Flynn	New Zealand	1:59.97	
27	5	9	Natthanan Junkrajang	Thailand	2:00.30	
28	4	7	Ho Nam Wai	Hong Kong	2:00.49	
29	4	9	Ieva Maluka	Latvia	2:01.01	
30	3	3	Ines Marin	Chile	2:01.16	
31	3	1	Rachel Tseng	Singapore	2:01.31	
31	3	5	Jasmine Alkhaldi	Philippines	2:01.31	
33	3	4	McKenna DeBever	Peru	2:01.50	
34	5	8	Selen Özbilen	Turkey	2:01.67	
35	3	7	Lamija Medošević	Bosnia and Herzegovina	2:03.03	
36	3	2	Shivani	India	2:03.70	
37	1	7	Enkhkhuslen Batbayar	Mongolia	2:04.84	NR
38	3	0	Elizaveta Rogozhnikova	Kyrgyzstan	2:05.41	NR
39	3	8	Nicole Rautemberg	Paraguay	2:05.47	
40	3	6	Gabriela Santis	Guatemala	2:05.76	
41	3	9	Ani Poghosyan	Armenia	2:06.75	NR
42	2	9	Mya Azzopardi	Malta	2:06.77	
43	2	7	Nadia Tudo Cubells	Andorra	2:07.63	
44	1	3	Karla Abarca	Nicaragua	2:09.14	
45	2	5	Leedia Alsafadi	Jordan	2:11.17	
46	2	2	Lorna Doorman	Zimbabwe	2:12.83	
47	2	4	Tinatin Kevlishvili	Georgia	2:13.74	
48	2	3	Lidia Boguslawska	United States Virgin Islands	2:13.89	
49	1	6	Inana Suleiman	Syria	2:14.43	
50	1	4	Thimali Bandera	Sri Lanka	2:14.83	
51	2	8	Bianca Mitchell	Antigua and Barbuda	2:15.17	
52	1	5	Araoluwa Oyetunji	Nigeria	2:16.23	
53	2	6	Eleonora Singsombath	Laos	2:20.13	NR
54	1	2	Charissa Panuve	Tonga	2:27.08	
55	2	1	Jin Ju Thompson	Northern Mariana Islands	2:27.89	
56	2	0	Amanda Poppe	Guam	2:36.63	

=== Final ===
The final was held at 19:09.

Rank	Lane	Name	Nationality	Time	Notes
1st place, gold medalist(s)	5	Ariarne Titmus	Australia	1:51.38	OC
2nd place, silver medalist(s)	4	Mallory Comerford	United States	1:51.81	NR
3rd place, bronze medalist(s)	6	Femke Heemskerk	Netherlands	1:52.36	
4	7	Federica Pellegrini	Italy	1:53.18	
5	1	Wang Jianjiahe	China	1:53.23	
6	2	Michelle Coleman	Sweden	1:53.83	
7	3	Veronika Andrusenko	Russia	1:54.26	
8	8	Barbora Seemanová	Czech Republic	1:54.82	
