= Swimming at the 2017 Summer Universiade – Women's 4 × 100 metre freestyle relay =

Women's 4 × 100 metre freestyle relay at the 2017 Summer Universiade
- Venue: National Taiwan Sport University Arena
- Location: Taipei, Taiwan
- Dates: 20 August (heats and final)
- Competitors: 82 from 19 nations
- Winning time: 3:39.21

Medalists
gold medal	Katerine Savard; Jacqueline Keire; Sarah Fournier; Alexia Zevnik; Kennedy Goss; Kelsey Wog	Canada
silver medal	Maria Kameneva; Polina Lapshina; Anastasia Guzhenkova; Arina Openysheva; Mariya Baklakova	Russia
bronze medal	Caroline Baldwin; Claire Rasmus; Katrina Konopka; Veronica Burchill; Katie Drabot; Katie McLaughlin	United States

The Women's 4 × 100 metre freestyle relay competition at the 2017 Summer Universiade was held on 20 August 2017.

== Records ==
Prior to the competition, the existing world and Universiade records were as follows.

World record	Australia	3:30.65	Rio de Janeiro, Brazil	6 August 2016
Competition record	United States	3:38.12	Gwangju, South Korea	4 July 2015

== Results ==
=== Heats ===
The heats were held at 11:21.

Rank	Heat	Lane	Nation	Swimmers	Time	Notes
1	3	4	United States	Claire Rasmus (55.50); Katrina Konopka (55.20); Katie Drabot (55.37); Katie McLaughlin (55.23)	3:41.30	Q
2	3	3	Russia	Mariya Baklakova (56.41); Polina Lapshina (54.89); Anastasia Guzhenkova (55.17); Arina Openysheva (55.42)	3:41.89	Q
3	2	3	Brazil	Larissa Oliveira (54.96); Alessandra Marchioro (55.71); Manuella Lyrio (55.35); Daynara de Paula (56.21)	3:42.23	Q
4	2	4	Italy	Rachele Ceracchi (56.51); Aglaia Pezzato (55.26); Paola Biagioli (55.59); Laura Letrari (54.98)	3:42.34	Q
5	3	5	Japan	Chihiro Igarashi (55.40); Rika Omoto (55.37); Ayu Iwamoto (55.96); Kanako Watanabe (56.07)	3:42.80	Q
6	3	6	Great Britain	Jessica Jackson (56.46); Kathryn Greenslade (56.16); Lucy Hope (55.44); Anna Hopkin (54.88)	3:42.94	Q
7	2	5	Canada	Sarah Fournier (56.34); Jacqueline Keire (55.33); Kennedy Goss (56.07); Kelsey Wog (56.25)	3:43.94	Q
8	3	2	France	Manon Viguier (57.54); Assia Touati (55.76); Cassandra Petit (55.85); Alizée Morel (55.68)	3:44.83	Q
9	2	7	Australia	Abbey Harkin (56.53); Laura Taylor (56.41); Sian Whittaker (56.29); Gemma Cooney (55.86)	3:45.09	
10	3	7	Poland	Dominika Sztandera (56.58); Joanna Cieślak (57.70); Kalina Gralewska (56.36); Anna Dowgiert (56.31)	3:46.95	
11	2	2	Hong Kong	Siobhán Haughey (53.83) NR; Tam Hoi Lam (57.87); Chan Kin Lok (58.11); Yu Wai Ting (58.21)	3:48.02	
12	2	1	Netherlands	Kira Toussaint (56.38); Tessa Vermeulen (57.23); Kinge Zandringa (58.41); Marieke Tienstra (56.84)	3:48.86	
13	2	6	South Korea	Choi Hae-min (56.55); Hwang Seo-jin (57.10); Park Han-byeol (57.42); Choi Jung-min (58.34)	3:49.41	
14	3	1	Chinese Taipei	Lee Yen-ni (58.51); Mo Li-err (57.50); Chang Fang-yu (58.58); Hsu An (58.77)	3:53.36	
15	3	8	Finland	Fanny Teijonsalo (57.80); Patricia Aschan (59.15); Nea Norismaa (59.36); Tanja Kylliäinen (59.14)	3:55.45	
16	1	3	China	Wu Tong (59.11); Zhu Xiaotong (59.29); Xu Jue (59.72); Xu Lili (58.67)	3:56.79	
17	1	6	Argentina	Maria Belén Díaz (58.53); Fiamma Peroni Malizia (1:00.81); Olivia Carrizo Kuchen (1:00.49); Florencia Panzini (59.84)	3:59.67	
18	1	6	Chile	Daniela Reyes (1:01.28); Marianne Spuhr (1:04.34); Leila Chanuar (1:02.66); Alejandra Chamorro (1:03.47)	4:11.75	
19	2	8	Philippines	Aubrey Ybanez (1:18.89); Martina Villanueva (1:23.72); Jazmine Mirasol (1:26.15); Macy Reyes (1:36.64)	5:45.40	
	1	5	Nigeria		DNS	

=== Final ===
The final was held at 20:09.

Rank	Lane	Nation	Swimmers	Time	Notes
1st place, gold medalist(s)	1	Canada	Katerine Savard (54.93); Jacqueline Keire (54.25); Sarah Fournier (55.93); Alexia Zevnik (54.10)	3:39.21	
2nd place, silver medalist(s)	5	Russia	Maria Kameneva (54.79); Polina Lapshina (54.87); Anastasia Guzhenkova (54.98); Arina Openysheva (54.75)	3:39.39	
3rd place, bronze medalist(s)	4	United States	Caroline Baldwin (54.57); Claire Rasmus (55.72); Katrina Konopka (55.61); Veronica Burchill (54.19)	3:40.09	
4	7	Great Britain	Lucy Hope (55.19); Jessica Jackson (55.48); Kathryn Greenslade (55.86); Anna Hopkin (54.33)	3:40.86	
5	3	Brazil	Larissa Oliveira (55.07); Alessandra Marchioro (55.28); Manuella Lyrio (55.35); Daynara de Paula (55.82)	3:41.52	
6	2	Japan	Chihiro Igarashi (55.28); Rika Omoto (55.60); Ayu Iwamoto (55.31); Kanako Watanabe (55.69)	3:41.88	
7	6	Italy	Aglaia Pezzato (55.48); Paola Biagioli (55.93); Rachele Ceracchi (56.03); Laura Letrari (55.27)	3:42.71	
8	8	France	Assia Touati (55.87); Alizée Morel (55.20); Cassandra Petit (55.77); Marion Abert (56.72)	3:43.56	
