= 2021 FINA World Swimming Championships (25 m) – Women's 4 × 200 metre freestyle relay =

Swimming competition

Women's 4 × 200 metre freestyle relay at the 2021 FINA World Swimming Championships (25 m)
- Venue: Etihad Arena
- Location: Abu Dhabi, United Arab Emirates
- Dates: 20 December (heats and final)
- Competitors: 42 from 9 nations
- Teams: 9
- Winning time: 7:32.96

Medalists
gold medal	Summer McIntosh; Kayla Sanchez; Katerine Savard; Rebecca Smith; Tessa Cieplucha; Sydney Pickrem	Canada
silver medal	Torri Huske; Abbey Weitzeil; Melanie Margalis; Paige Madden; Katharine Berkoff; Emma Weyant	United States
bronze medal	Li Bingjie; Cheng Yujie; Zhu Menghui; Liu Yaxin	China

The Women's 4 × 200 metre freestyle relay competition of the 2021 FINA World Swimming Championships (25 m) was held on 20 December 2021.

== Background ==
Summer McIntosh, a member of the Canadian national team, achieved her inaugural international gold medal shortly after participating in the 2020 Tokyo Olympics.

== Records ==
Prior to the competition, the existing world and championship records were as follows.

World record	Netherlands (NED)	7:32.85	Doha, Qatar	3 December 2014
Competition record	Netherlands (NED)	7:32.85	Doha, Qatar	3 December 2014

== Results ==
=== Heats ===
The heats were started at 11:38.

Rank	Heat	Lane	Nation	Swimmers	Time	Notes
1	1	5	Russian Swimming Federation	Ekaterina Nikonova (1:56.17); Anna Egorova (1:57.46); Daria S. Ustinova (1:56.06); Valeriya Salamatina (1:54.80)	7:44.49	Q
2	1	4	United States	Torri Huske (1:56.41); Katharine Berkoff (1:55.89); Emma Weyant (1:57.28); Paige Madden (1:56.00)	7:45.58	Q
3	2	4	China	Li Bingjie (1:55.75); Cheng Yujie (1:56.29); Zhu Menghui (1:58.70); Liu Yaxin (1:56.76)	7:47.50	Q
4	1	3	Hungary	Fanni Gyurinovics (1:57.31); Ajna Késely (1:56.82); Nikolett Pádár (1:56.70); Boglárka Kapás (1:57.45)	7:48.28	Q
5	2	3	Germany	Isabel Marie Gose (1:56.39); Annika Bruhn (1:56.98); Leonie Kullmann (1:58.81); Marie Pietruschka (1:58.69)	7:50.87	Q
6	2	5	Canada	Tessa Cieplucha (1:57.33); Rebecca Smith (1:56.25); Summer McIntosh (1:59.58); Sydney Pickrem (2:00.66)	7:53.82	Q
7	2	6	Brazil	Nathalia Almeida (1:57.64); Viviane Jungblut (1:59.05); Giovanna Diamante (1:58.99); Gabrielle Roncatto (1:58.72)	7:54.40	Q
8	2	2	Hong Kong	Katii Tang (1:58.31); Sze Hang Yu (1:58.41); Chloe Cheng (1:59.20); Stephanie Au (1:59.56)	7:55.48	Q, NR
9	1	6	Turkey	Deniz Ertan (1:58.90); Merve Tuncel (1:59.51); Beril Böcekler (2:00.62); Ekaterina Avramova (2:00.46)	7:59.49	
	1	2	Singapore		DNS	
	2	7	Slovakia		DNS	

=== Final ===
The final was held at 19:55.

Rank	Lane	Nation	Swimmers	Time	Notes
1st place, gold medalist(s)	7	Canada	Summer McIntosh (1:54.30); Kayla Sanchez (1:52.97); Katerine Savard (1:54.01); Rebecca Smith (1:51.68)	7:32.96	AM
2nd place, silver medalist(s)	5	United States	Torri Huske (1:54.72); Abbey Weitzeil (1:54.31); Melanie Margalis (1:54.83); Paige Madden (1:52.67)	7:36.53	
3rd place, bronze medalist(s)	3	China	Li Bingjie (1:53.42); Cheng Yujie (1:54.91); Zhu Menghui (1:55.73); Liu Yaxin (1:55.86)	7:39.92	
4	4	Russian Swimming Federation	Ekaterina Nikonova (1:55.48); Valeriya Salamatina (1:55.33); Anna Egorova (1:55.34); Daria S. Ustinova (1:56.31)	7:42.46	
5	6	Hungary	Zsuzsanna Jakabos (1:55.36); Fanni Gyurinovics (1:56.89); Nikolett Pádár (1:57.56); Ajna Késely (1:57.23)	7:47.04	
6	2	Germany	Isabel Marie Gose (1:55.00); Annika Bruhn (1:57.48); Leonie Kullmann (1:56.89); Marie Pietruschka (1:57.76)	7:47.13	
7	1	Brazil	Nathalia Almeida (1:57.49); Viviane Jungblut (1:59.49); Giovanna Diamante (1:56.53); Gabrielle Roncatto (1:58.36)	7:51.87	
8	8	Hong Kong	Katii Tang (1:59.92); Stephanie Au (2:01.76); Chloe Cheng (1:58.80); Chan Kin Lok (2:03.19)	8:03.67	
