= Swimming at the 2017 Summer Universiade – Women's 4 × 200 metre freestyle relay =

Women's 4 × 200 metre freestyle relay at the 2017 Summer Universiade
- Venue: National Taiwan Sport University Arena
- Location: Taipei, Taiwan
- Dates: 23 August (heats and final)
- Competitors: 72 from 16 nations
- Winning time: 7:55.28

Medalists
gold medal	Anastasia Guzhenkova; Valeria Salamatina; Mariya Baklakova; Arina Openysheva; Anna Egorova	Russia
silver medal	Claire Rasmus; Katie Drabot; Katie McLaughlin; Ella Eastin; Kaersten Meitz; Allyson McHugh; Asia Seidt; Brooke Forde	United States
bronze medal	Chihiro Igarashi; Rika Omoto; Wakaba Tsuyuuchi; Yui Ohashi; Tsuzumi Hasegawa	Japan

The Women's 4 × 200 metre freestyle relay competition at the 2017 Summer Universiade was held on 23 August 2017.

== Records ==
Prior to the competition, the existing world and Universiade records were as follows.

World record	China	7:42.08	Rome, Italy	30 July 2009
Competition record	United States	7:53.88	Gwangju, South Korea	7 July 2015

== Results ==
=== Heats ===
The heats were held at 10:35.

Rank	Heat	Lane	Nation	Swimmers	Time	Notes
1	2	4	United States	Kaersten Meitz (2:00.49); Allyson McHugh (2:00.55); Asia Seidt (2:00.10); Brooke Forde (2:00.90)	8:02.04	Q
2	1	4	Russia	Mariya Baklakova (2:01.40); Anna Egorova (2:01.69); Valeria Salamatina (2:00.15); Anastasia Guzhenkova (2:00.38)	8:03.62	Q
2	2	5	Japan	Rika Omoto (2:00.94); Tsuzumi Hasegawa (2:01.88); Wakaba Tsuyuuchi (2:01.16); Chihiro Igarashi (1:59.64)	8:03.62	Q
4	1	5	Canada	Kennedy Goss ( 2:01.19); Jacqueline Keire (2:01.03); Danica Ludlow (1:58.83); Mackenzie Glover (2:03.32)	8:04.37	Q
5	1	6	Australia	Kiah Melverton (2:01.54); Gemma Cooney (1:59.85); Laura Taylor (2:01.37); Abbey Harkin (2:01.76)	8:04.52	Q
6	2	3	Great Britain	Jessica Jackson (2:02.93); Kathryn Greenslade (2:00.18); Camilla Hattersley (1:59.42); Lucy Hope (2:02.11)	8:04.64	Q
7	2	6	Italy	Rachele Ceracchi (2:02.04); Linda Caponi (2:01.18); Paola Biagioli (2:01.51); Erica Musso (2:00.29)	8:05.02	Q
8	1	3	Brazil	Maria Heitmann (2:01.87); Manuella Lyrio (2:00.97); Viviane Jungblut (2:03.86); Larissa Oliveira (2:00.96)	8:07.66	Q
9	2	2	France	Assia Touati (2:02.18); Marion Abert (2:01.66); Manon Viguier (2:03.71); Alizée Morel (2:01.84)	8:09.39	
10	2	7	Czech Republic	Vera Kopřivová (2:03.55); Barbora Závadová (2:03.68); Tereza Závadová (2:09.85); Martina Elhenická (2:05.33)	8:22.41	
11	1	1	Chinese Taipei	Lee Yen-ni (2:06.45); Chang Fang-yu (2:05.46); Tseng Chieh-chuan (2:08.40); Hsu An (2:04.60)	8:24.91	
12	1	2	South Korea	Choi Hae-min (2:04.72); Hwang Seo-jin (2:07.46); Park Jin-young (2:11.29); Choi Jung-min (2:01.75)	8:25.22	
13	2	1	Hong Kong	Wong Yee Ching (2:06.59); Yeung Jamie Zhen Mei (2:04.88); Yu Wai Ting (2:12.00); Rainbow Ip (2:13.42)	8:36.89	
14	1	8	Argentina	Florencia Panzini (2:08.49); Maria Belén (2:12.22); Fiamma Peroni (2:13.41); Olivia Carrizo (2:12.40)	8:46.52	
15	2	8	Philippines	Carmenrose Matabuena (2:26.30); Trisha Oliveros (2:45.25); Joy Rodgers (2:48.04); Princess Estal (3:35.20)	11:34.79	
	1	7	Poland	Kalina Gralewska (2:03.38); Paula Żukowska (2:05.11); Joanna Cieślak; Justyna Burska	DSQ	

=== Final ===
The final was held at 20:53.

Rank	Lane	Nation	Swimmers	Time	Notes
1st place, gold medalist(s)	3	Russia	Anastasia Guzhenkova (1:58.84); Valeria Salamatina (1:59.00); Mariya Baklakova (1:59.72); Arina Openysheva (1:57.72)	7:55.28	
2nd place, silver medalist(s)	4	United States	Claire Rasmus (1:58.85); Katie Drabot (1:58.75); Katie McLaughlin (1:59.11); Ella Eastin (1:58.61)	7:55.32	
3rd place, bronze medalist(s)	5	Japan	Chihiro Igarashi (1:59.15); Rika Omoto (2:00.50); Wakaba Tsuyuuchi (2:01.08); Yui Ohashi (1:58.86)	7:59.59	
4	7	Great Britain	Kathryn Greenslade (1:59.60); Camilla Hattersley (1:59.73); Jessica Jackson (2:01.88); Lucy Hope (1:59.72)	8:00.93	
5	6	Canada	Jacqueline Keire (2:01.07); Katerine Savard (2:00.19); Danica Ludlow (2:00.08); Kennedy Goss (1:59.66)	8:01.00	
6	1	Italy	Linda Caponi (2:01.73); Laura Letrari (2:01.98); Rachele Ceracchi (2:00.10); Erica Musso (2:00.15)	8:03.96	
7	2	Australia	Laura Taylor (2:01.76); Gemma Cooney (1:59.80); Kiah Melverton (2:01.81); Abbey Harkin (2:01.39)	8:04.76	
8	8	Brazil	Manuella Lyrio (1:59.92); Larissa Oliveira (1:59.97); Maria Heitmann (2:00.66); Viviane Jungblut (2:04.82)	8:05.37	
