= Swimming at the 2016 European Aquatics Championships – Women's 200 metre freestyle =

Women's 200 metre freestyle at the 2016 European Aquatics Championships
- Dates: 20–21 May
- Competitors: 62 from 27 nations
- Winning time: 1:55.93

Medalists
gold medal	Federica Pellegrini	Italy
silver medal	Femke Heemskerk	Netherlands
bronze medal	Charlotte Bonnet	France

The Women's 200 metre freestyle competition of the 2016 European Aquatics Championships was held on 20 and 21 May 2016.

== Records ==
Prior to the competition, the existing world, European and championship records were as follows.

	Name	Nation	Time	Location	Date
World record	Federica Pellegrini	Italy	1:52.98	Rome	29 July 2009
European record	Federica Pellegrini	Italy	1:52.98	Rome	29 July 2009
Championship record	Federica Pellegrini	Italy	1:55.45	Budapest	14 August 2010

== Results ==
=== Heats ===
The heats were held on 20 May at 10:17.

Rank	Heat	Lane	Name	Nationality	Time	Notes
1	6	4	Femke Heemskerk	Netherlands	1:57.91	Q
2	5	4	Federica Pellegrini	Italy	1:57.96	Q
3	7	5	Charlotte Bonnet	France	1:58.54	Q
4	5	7	Patricia Castro	Spain	1:58.72	Q
5	6	6	Nina Rangelova	Bulgaria	1:59.17	Q
6	7	9	Maria Ugolkova	Switzerland	1:59.47	Q
7	5	3	Esmee Vermeulen	Netherlands	1:59.51	Q
7	5	5	Melani Costa	Spain	1:59.51	Q
9	6	7	Andrea Murez	Israel	1:59.62	Q
10	6	1	Ajna Késely	Hungary	1:59.93	Q
11	7	3	Robin Neumann	Netherlands	1:59.96	
12	7	1	Martina De Memme	Italy	2:00.06	Q
13	7	0	Camilla Hattersley	Great Britain	2:00.12	Q
14	7	6	Ellie Faulkner	Great Britain	2:00.18	Q
15	4	4	Lotte Goris	Belgium	2:00.32	Q
16	4	8	Tjaša Pintar	Slovenia	2:00.68	Q
17	5	1	Evelyn Verrasztó	Hungary	2:00.78	Q
17	6	5	Alice Mizzau	Italy	2:00.78	
19	6	2	Georgia Coates	Great Britain	2:00.83	
20	4	7	Noemi Girardet	Switzerland	2:00.94	
21	6	8	Margaux Fabre	France	2:01.21	
22	5	2	Erica Musso	Italy	2:01.23	
23	6	3	Marrit Steenbergen	Netherlands	2:01.32	
24	3	4	Marte Løvberg	Norway	2:01.67	
25	4	5	Stina Gardell	Sweden	2:01.71	
26	4	2	Juliette Casini	Belgium	2:01.82	
27	5	8	Cecilie Johannessen	Norway	2:02.00	
28	2	6	Nika Petrič	Slovenia	2:02.18	
29	5	9	Janja Šegel	Slovenia	2:02.20	
30	6	0	Georgina Boyle	Great Britain	2:02.25	
31	2	5	Diana Sokołowska	Poland	2:02.36	
32	2	1	Špela Bohinc	Slovenia	2:02.37	
33	6	9	Anna Kolářová	Czech Republic	2:02.40	
33	3	8	Paula Żukowska	Poland	2:02.40	
35	3	6	Diana Duraes	Portugal	2:02.81	
36	7	7	Cloe Hache	France	2:02.88	
37	7	2	Lisa Zaiser	Austria	2:03.16	
38	4	0	Valentine Dumont	Belgium	2:03.27	
39	3	5	Gizem Bozkurt	Turkey	2:03.33	
40	5	0	Danielle Villars	Switzerland	2:03.45	
41	4	9	Henriette Stenkvist	Sweden	2:03.50	
42	3	3	Wioletta Orczykowska	Poland	2:03.64	
43	2	4	Věra Kopřivová	Czech Republic	2:04.42	
44	3	1	Julia Kukla	Austria	2:04.49	
45	2	2	Anniina Ala-Seppälä	Finland	2:04.56	
45	3	2	Monika Czerniak	Poland	2:04.56	
47	2	7	Tanja Kylliaeinen	Finland	2:05.06	
48	3	7	Aino Otava	Finland	2:05.92	
49	3	0	Camille Bouden	Belgium	2:06.17	
50	4	3	Daryna Zevina	Ukraine	2:06.34	
51	1	4	Elena Giovannini	San Marino	2:07.01	
52	2	0	Sara Nysted	Faroe Islands	2:07.14	
53	1	3	Sara Lettoli	San Marino	2:07.29	
54	4	1	Esra Kaçmaz	Turkey	2:07.58	
55	1	6	Monica Ramírez	Andorra	2:08.57	
56	2	9	Nejla Karić	Bosnia and Herzegovina	2:08.68	
57	1	5	Elisa Bernardi	San Marino	2:09.67	
58	1	7	Nikol Merizaj	Albania	2:09.94	
59	3	9	Laura Lajunen	Finland	2:11.10	
60	2	3	Tatiana Perstniova	Moldova	2:12.75	
61	1	1	Monika Vasilyan	Armenia	2:12.80	
62	1	2	Nadia Tudo	Andorra	2:13.92	
	4	6	Claudia Hufnagl	Austria	DNS	
	7	8	Fatima Gallardo	Spain	DNS	
	2	8	Sycerika McMahon	Ireland	DNS	
	5	6	Louise Hansson	Sweden	DNS	
	7	4	Sarah Sjöström	Sweden	DNS	

=== Semifinals ===
The semifinals were held on 20 May at 18:15.

==== Semifinal 1 ====
Rank	Lane	Name	Nationality	Time	Notes
1	4	Federica Pellegrini	Italy	1:56.73	Q
2	8	Evelyn Verrasztó	Hungary	1:58.66	Q
3	2	Ajna Késely	Hungary	1:58.69	Q
4	5	Patricia Castro	Spain	1:58.83	Q
5	3	Maria Ugolkova	Switzerland	1:58.97	
6	6	Esmee Vermeulen	Netherlands	1:59.66	
7	7	Camilla Hattersley	Great Britain	2:00.27	
8	1	Lotte Goris	Belgium	2:00.28	

==== Semifinal 2 ====
Rank	Lane	Name	Nationality	Time	Notes
1	4	Femke Heemskerk	Netherlands	1:56.68	Q
2	5	Charlotte Bonnet	France	1:57.64	Q
3	6	Melani Costa	Spain	1:58.10	Q
4	3	Nina Rangelova	Bulgaria	1:58.68	Q
5	7	Martina De Memme	Italy	1:59.31	
6	1	Ellie Faulkner	Great Britain	1:59.84	
7	2	Andrea Murez	Israel	1:59.91	
8	8	Tjaša Pintar	Slovenia	2:00.54	

=== Final ===
The final was on 21 May at 16:36.

Rank	Lane	Name	Nationality	Time	Notes
1st place, gold medalist(s)	5	Federica Pellegrini	Italy	1:55.93	
2nd place, silver medalist(s)	4	Femke Heemskerk	Netherlands	1:55.97	
3rd place, bronze medalist(s)	3	Charlotte Bonnet	France	1:56.51	
4	6	Melani Costa	Spain	1:58.08	
5	2	Evelyn Verrasztó	Hungary	1:58.16	
6	1	Ajna Késely	Hungary	1:58.24	
7	7	Nina Rangelova	Bulgaria	1:58.27	
8	8	Patricia Castro	Spain	1:58.69	
