= Swimming at the 2020 Summer Olympics – Women's 200 metre freestyle =

Women's 200 metre freestyle at the Games of the XXXII Olympiad
- Venue: Tokyo Aquatics Centre
- Dates: 26 July 2021 (heats); 27 July 2021 (semifinals); 28 July 2021 (final)
- Competitors: 29 from 22 nations
- Winning time: 1:53.50

Medalists
1st place, gold medalist(s)		Ariarne Titmus	Australia
2nd place, silver medalist(s)		Siobhán Haughey	Hong Kong
3rd place, bronze medalist(s)		Penny Oleksiak	Canada

The women's 200 metre freestyle event at the 2020 Summer Olympics was held from 26 to 28 July 2021 at the Tokyo Aquatics Centre. It was the event's fourteenth consecutive appearance, having been held at every edition since 1968.

== Summary ==
After a victory in the 400 m freestyle two days earlier, Australia's Ariarne Titmus pulled away from the field to capture the Olympic mid-distance freestyle crown and her second individual gold at these Games. Hanging with the leaders at the 150-metre turn, Titmus overtook Hong Kong's Siobhán Haughey in the final 25 m to establish a new Olympic Record of 1:53.50. Despite leading for the first three laps, Haughey was unable to catch a fast-finishing Titmus near the wall, winning silver in an Asian record of 1:53.92. Haughey's silver also marked Hong Kong's first ever Olympic medal in swimming. Meanwhile, Canada's Penny Oleksiak moved up from one of the outside lanes to take home the bronze in 1:54.70.

China's Yang Junxuan was second at the 150-metre turn though ultimately slipped off the podium to fourth in 1:55.01. The U.S.' defending Olympic champion Katie Ledecky finished fifth with a time of 1:55.21 while the Czech Republic's Barbora Seemanova recorded a national record of 1:55.45 to touch sixth. Italy's world-record holder Federica Pellegrini grabbed the penultimate spot of the top eight in 1:55.91 with Titmus' teammate Madison Wilson (1:56.39) trailing her to round out the field.

The medals for competition were presented by Giovanni Malagò, IOC member, and the gifts were presented by Donald Rukare, FINA Bureau Member.

== Records ==
Prior to this competition, the existing world and Olympic records were as follows.

World record	Federica Pellegrini (ITA)	1:52.98	Rome, Italy	29 July 2009
Olympic record	Allison Schmitt (USA)	1:53.61	London, United Kingdom	31 July 2012

The following record was established during the competition:

Date	Event	Swimmer	Nation	Time	Record
July 28	Final	Ariarne Titmus	Australia	1:53.50	OR

== Qualification ==
The Olympic Qualifying Time for the event is 1:57.28. Up to two swimmers per National Olympic Committee (NOC) can automatically qualify by swimming that time at an approved qualification event. The Olympic Selection Time is 2:00.80. Up to one swimmer per NOC meeting that time is eligible for selection, allocated by world ranking until the maximum quota for all swimming events is reached. NOCs without a female swimmer qualified in any event can also use their universality place.

== Competition format ==
The competition consisted of three rounds: heats, semifinals, and a final. The swimmers with the best 16 times in the heats advance to the semifinals. The swimmers with the best 8 times in the semifinals advance to the final. Swim-offs are used as necessary to break ties for advancement to the next round.

== Schedule ==
All times are Japan Standard Time (UTC+9)

Date	Time	Round
Monday, 26 July 2021	19:00	Heats
Tuesday, 27 July 2021	10:30	Semifinals
Wednesday, 28 July 2021	10:41	Final

== Results ==
=== Heats ===
The swimmers with the top 16 times, regardless of heat, advance to the semifinals.

Rank	Heat	Lane	Swimmer	Nation	Time	Notes
1	2	4	Katie Ledecky	United States	1:55.28	Q
2	2	6	Penny Oleksiak	Canada	1:55.38	Q
3	2	5	Madison Wilson	Australia	1:55.87	Q
4	4	4	Ariarne Titmus	Australia	1:55.88	Q
5	4	6	Summer McIntosh	Canada	1:56.11	Q
6	4	5	Yang Junxuan	China	1:56.17	Q
7	3	6	Barbora Seemanová	Czech Republic	1:56.38	Q
8	3	5	Siobhán Haughey	Hong Kong	1:56.48	Q
9	3	2	Isabel Marie Gose	Germany	1:56.80	Q
10	2	3	Charlotte Bonnet	France	1:56.88	Q
11	3	3	Freya Anderson	Great Britain	1:56.96	Q
12	4	3	Allison Schmitt	United States	1:57.10	Q
13	4	7	Annika Bruhn	Germany	1:57.15	Q
14	2	7	Erika Fairweather	New Zealand	1:57.26	Q
15	3	4	Federica Pellegrini	Italy	1:57.33	Q
16	3	7	Valeriya Salamatina	ROC	1:58.33	Q
17	2	1	Janja Šegel	Slovenia	1:58.38	
18	3	1	Joanna Evans	Bahamas	1:58.40	
19	4	1	Andrea Murez	Israel	1:58.97	
20	4	2	Li Bingjie	China	1:59.03	
21	2	2	Veronika Andrusenko	ROC	1:59.17	
22	3	8	Snæfríður Jórunnardóttir	Iceland	2:00.20	NR
23	4	8	Elisbet Gámez	Cuba	2:00.56	
24	1	4	Ieva Maļuka	Latvia	2:03.75	
25	1	3	Beatriz Padrón	Costa Rica	2:04.56	
26	2	8	Nguyễn Thị Ánh Viên	Vietnam	2:05.30	
27	1	5	Gabriela Santis	Guatemala	2:07.24	
28	1	6	Lina Khiyara	Morocco	2:08.80	
29	1	2	Gabriella Doueihy	Lebanon	2:11.29	

=== Semifinals ===
The swimmers with the best 8 times, regardless of heat, advanced to the final.

Rank	Heat	Lane	Swimmer	Nation	Time	Notes
1	1	5	Ariarne Titmus	Australia	1:54.82	Q
2	1	6	Siobhán Haughey	Hong Kong	1:55.16	Q
3	2	4	Katie Ledecky	United States	1:55.34	Q
4	1	3	Yang Junxuan	China	1:55.98	Q
5	2	6	Barbora Seemanová	Czech Republic	1:56.14	Q, NR
6	1	4	Penny Oleksiak	Canada	1:56.39	Q
7	2	8	Federica Pellegrini	Italy	1:56.44	Q
8	2	5	Madison Wilson	Australia	1:56.58	Q
9	2	3	Summer McIntosh	Canada	1:56.82	
10	1	7	Allison Schmitt	United States	1:56.87	
11	2	2	Isabel Marie Gose	Germany	1:57.07	
12	2	7	Freya Anderson	Great Britain	1:57.10	
13	1	2	Charlotte Bonnet	France	1:57.35	
14	2	1	Annika Bruhn	Germany	1:57.62	
15	1	8	Valeriya Salamatina	ROC	1:58.98	
16	1	1	Erika Fairweather	New Zealand	1:59.14	

=== Final ===
Rank	Lane	Swimmer	Nation	Time	Notes
1st place, gold medalist(s)	4	Ariarne Titmus	Australia	1:53.50	OR
2nd place, silver medalist(s)	5	Siobhán Haughey	Hong Kong	1:53.92	AS
3rd place, bronze medalist(s)	7	Penny Oleksiak	Canada	1:54.70	
4	6	Yang Junxuan	China	1:55.01	
5	3	Katie Ledecky	United States	1:55.21	
6	2	Barbora Seemanová	Czech Republic	1:55.45	NR
7	1	Federica Pellegrini	Italy	1:55.91	
8	8	Madison Wilson	Australia	1:56.39	
