= Claire Rasmus =

American swimmer (born 1996)

Personal information
- National team: United States
- Born: December 10, 1996 (age 29) Metairie, Louisiana, U.S.
- Height: 5 ft 11 in (180 cm)
- Weight: 170 lb (77 kg)

Sport
- Sport: Swimming
- Strokes: Freestyle
- Club: Texas A&M University
Medal record
Women's swimming
Representing the United States
World University Games
Gold medal – first place	2019 Naples	4×100 m freestyle
Gold medal – first place	2019 Naples	4×200 m freestyle
Silver medal – second place	2017 Taipei	4×200 m freestyle
Bronze medal – third place	2017 Taipei	4×100 m freestyle
Pan American Games
Gold medal – first place	2019 Lima	200 m freestyle
Gold medal – first place	2019 Lima	4×100 m freestyle
Gold medal – first place	2019 Lima	4×200 m freestyle
Gold medal – first place	2019 Lima	Mixed 4×100 m freestyle

Claire Rasmus (born December 10, 1996) is an American freestyle swimmer who competes in international level events. She is a four-time Pan American Games champion.
