= Lifesaving at the 2017 World Games =

Life saving at the 2017 World Games
- Venue: Orbita Swimming Pool
- Dates: 21–22 July 2017
- Competitors: 98 from 10 nations

The life saving competition at the 2017 World Games took place from July 21 to July 22, in Wrocław in Poland, at the Orbita Swimming Pool.

== Participating nations ==
- Australia (11)
- Belgium (9)
- China (9)
- France (10)
- Germany (10)
- Italy (10)
- Japan (9)
- New Zealand (10)
- Poland (10)
- Spain (10)

== Medal table ==
Rank	Nation	Gold	Silver	Bronze	Total
1	Italy	6	4	2	12
2	Germany	3	2	3	8
3	Australia	2	5	5	12
4	France	2	1	2	5
5	China	1	1	1	3
6	Belgium	1	0	0	1
6	Japan	1	0	0	1
8	Poland	0	3	1	4
9	New Zealand	0	0	1	1
9	Spain	0	0	1	1
Totals (10 entries)		16	16	16	48

== Medalists ==
=== Men ===
Event	Gold	Silver	Bronze
50m Manikin Carry	Danny Wieck; Germany	Joshua Perling; Germany	Bradley Woodward; Australia
100m Manikin Carry Fins	Jacopo Musso; Italy	Andrea Vittorio Piroddi; Italy	Kevin Lehr; Germany
100m Manikin Tow Fins	Jacopo Musso; Italy	Kevin Lehr; Germany	Samuel Bell; Australia
200m Super Lifesaver	Daniele Sanna; Italy	Federico Gilardi; Italy	Tom Montgomery; Australia
200m Obstacle	Bradley Woodward; Australia	Federico Gilardi; Italy	Steven Kent; New Zealand
4 x 25m Manikin Carry Relay	Germany (GER); Christian Ertel; Kevin Lehr; Joshua Perling; Danny Wieck	Poland (POL); Adam Dubiel; Cezary Kępa; Wojciech Kotowski; Bartosz Stanielewicz	Spain (ESP); Eduardo Blasco; Sergio Calderon; José Victor García; Carlos Perianez
4 x 50m Obstacle Relay	Japan (JPN); Naoya Hirano; Keisuke Hatano; Shun Nishiyama; Suguru Ando	Poland (POL); Cezary Kępa; Wojciech Kotowski; Bartosz Makowski; Adam Dubiel	France (FRA); Jérémy Badré; Florian Laclaustra; Gaëtan Quirin; Thomas Vilaceca
4 x 50m Medley Relay	Italy (ITA); Federico Gilardi; Jacopo Musso; Andrea Vittorio Piroddi; Daniele Sanna; Sacha Andrea Bartolo	Australia (AUS); Samuel Bell; Matthew Davis; Jake Smith; Bradley Woodward	Germany (GER); Christian Ertel; Kevin Lehr; Jan Malkowski; Danny Wieck

=== Women ===
Event	Gold	Silver	Bronze
50m Manikin Carry	Wu Huimin; China	Mariah Jones; Australia	Cristina Leanza; Italy
100m Manikin Carry Fins	Pamela Hendry; Australia	Justine Weyders; France	Federica Volpini; Italy
100m Manikin Tow Fins	Justine Weyders; France	Federica Volpini; Italy	Pamela Hendry; Australia
200m Super Lifesaver	Silvia Meschiari; Italy	Prue Davies; Australia	Mariah Jones; Australia
200m Obstacle	Silvia Meschiari; Italy	Alicja Tchórz; Poland	Margaux Fabre; France
4 x 25m Manikin Carry Relay	Belgium (BEL); Sofie Boogaerts; Aurelie Romanini; Nele Vanbuel; Bieke Vandenabeele; Stefanie Lindekens	China (CHN); Bao Xueyi; Dai Xiaodie; Hu Yifan; Wu Huimin	Germany (GER); Sophia Bauer; Annalena Geyer; Kerstin Lange; Jessica Luster
4 x 50m Obstacle Relay	France (FRA); Léna Bousquin; Margaux Fabre; Justine Weyders; Magali Rousseau; Delphine Dulat	Australia (AUS); Rachel Wood; Mariah Jones; Prue Davies; Pamela Hendry; Chelsea Gillet	China (CHN); Bao Xueyi; Wu Huimin; Hu Yifan; Dai Xiaodie
4 × 50m Medley Relay	Germany (GER); Sophia Bauer; Alena Kröhler; Kerstin Lange; Jessica Luster	Australia (AUS); Prue Davies; Chelsea Gillet; Pamela Hendry; Mariah Jones; Rachel Wood	Poland (POL); Karolina Faszczewska; Dominika Kossakowska; Anna Nocon; Alicja Tchórz
