= Swimming at the 2018 Commonwealth Games – Women's 4 × 100 metre medley relay =

Women's 4 × 100 metre medley relay at the 2018 Commonwealth Games
- Venue: Gold Coast Aquatic Centre
- Dates: 10 April
- Competitors: 32 from 8 nations
- Winning time: 3:54.36

Medalists
gold medal	Emily Seebohm; Georgia Bohl; Emma McKeon; Bronte Campbell	Australia
silver medal	Kylie Masse; Kierra Smith; Penny Oleksiak; Taylor Ruck	Canada
bronze medal	Georgia Davies; Chloé Tutton; Alys Thomas; Kathryn Greenslade	Wales

The women's 4 × 100 metre medley relay event at the 2018 Commonwealth Games was held on 10 April at the Gold Coast Aquatic Centre.

== Records ==
Prior to this competition, the existing world and Commonwealth Games records were as follows.

World record	United States (USA)	3:51.55	Budapest, Hungary	30 July 2017
Commonwealth record	Australia (AUS)	3:52.58	Rome, Italy	1 August 2009
Games record	Australia	3:56.23	Glasgow, United Kingdom	29 July 2014

The following records were established during the competition:

Date	Event	Nation	Swimmers	Time	Record
10 April	Final	Australia	Emily Seebohm (59.52); Georgia Bohl (1:06.85); Emma McKeon (56.42); Bronte Campbell (51.57)	3:54.36	GR

== Results ==
The final was held at 21:43.

Rank	Lane	Nation	Swimmers	Time	Notes
1st place, gold medalist(s)	4	Australia	Emily Seebohm (59.52); Georgia Bohl (1:06.85); Emma McKeon (56.42); Bronte Campbell (51.57)	3:54.36	GR
2nd place, silver medalist(s)	5	Canada	Kylie Masse (59.02); Kierra Smith (1:06.68); Penny Oleksiak (56.86); Taylor Ruck (52.54)	3:55.10	
3rd place, bronze medalist(s)	6	Wales	Georgia Davies (1:00.34); Chloé Tutton (1:07.39); Alys Thomas (57.29); Kathryn Greenslade (55.73)	4:00.75	
4	3	England	Lizzie Simmonds (1:00.62); Sarah Vasey (1:08.01); Siobhan-Marie O'Connor (58.57); Anna Hopkin (54.47)	4:01.67	
5	2	Scotland	Kathleen Dawson (1:01.72); Corrie Scott (1:08.33); Keanna MacInnes (1:00.63); Lucy Hope (54.49)	4:05.17	
6	8	New Zealand	Bobbi Gichard (1:01.65); Bronagh Ryan (1:10.09); Helena Gasson (1:00.32); Laticia Transom (55.41)	4:07.47	
7	1	South Africa	Nathania van Niekerk (1:04.08); Kaylene Corbett (1:11.68); Erin Gallagher (1:00.45); Emma Chelius (55.81)	4:12.02	
8	7	Isle of Man	Niamh Robinson (1:07.22); Laura Kinley (1:10.54); Charlotte Atkinson (59.66); Stephanie Brew (1:02.83)	4:20.25	
