= Jacob Heidtmann =

German swimmer (born 1994)

Personal information
- Full name: Jacob Oskar Julius Heidtmann
- Nationality: German
- Born: 6 November 1994 (age 31) Pinneberg, Schleswig-Holstein, Germany
- Height: 1.96 m (6 ft 5 in)
- Weight: 89 kg (196 lb)

Sport
- Sport: Swimming
- Strokes: Freestyle
Medal record
European Championships (LC)
Gold medal – first place	2018 Glasgow	4×200 m mixed freestyle

Jacob Heidtmann (born 6 November 1994) is a retired German swimmer. He competed in the men's 4 × 200 metre freestyle relay and the 400 metre medley event at the 2016 Summer Olympics.
