= Reform Alliance (United States) =

American non-profit legal organization

REFORM Alliance
- Nickname: Reform
- Formation: January 2019; 7 years ago
- Founders: Jay-Z; Meek Mill; Michael Rubin; Robert Kraft; Clara Wu Tsai; Daniel Loeb
- Type: Nonprofit
- Purpose: Justice reform; Probation reform; Parole reform; Prison reform; Compassionate release; Exoneration; "REFORM Alliance aims to transform probation and parole by changing laws, systems and culture to create real pathways to work and wellbeing."
- Location: United States
- Region served: Georgia, Iowa, Michigan, Mississippi, New Jersey, New York, Pennsylvania, Virginia
- Methods: Policymaking; Advocacy; Lobbying
- Chief of staff: Carmen Perez-Jordan
- Chief Policy Officer: Erin Haney
- Chief Executive Officer: Jessica Jackson
- Board of directors: Jay-Z; Meek Mill; Michael Rubin; Robert Rooks; Clara Wu Tsai; Laura Arnold; Michael Novogratz; Robert Kraft; Robert F. Smith; Van Jones
- Website: reformalliance.com

Reform Alliance (stylized as REFORM) is an American non-profit organization that advocates for probation and parole reform in the United States. It was founded in 2019 by Michael Rubin, Jay-Z, Meek Mill, Robert Kraft, Clara Wu Tsai, Daniel Loeb, Michael Novogratz, and Robert F. Smith.

== History ==
REFORM Alliance was founded and launched in January 2019 at an event at John Jay College by Michael Rubin, Meek Mill, Jay-Z, Robert Kraft, Michael Novogratz, Clara Wu Tsai, Robert F. Smith, and Daniel Loeb to advocate for reforms to probation and parole systems in the United States. At its launch, the founders pledged $50 million to support the organization's efforts to pursue bipartisan criminal justice reforms.

The organization was formed following public attention surrounding Meek Mill's 2017 sentencing for violating the terms of his probation in Philadelphia. Rubin and Kraft visited Mill while he was incarcerated, and Rubin and Jay-Z supported efforts related to his legal case, with Rubin organizing rallies and recruiting Philadelphia athletes to publicly advocate for Mill's release. This resulted in the reversal of his conviction and the removal of the judge from the case. Jay-Z, who served as an executive producer for Time: The Kalief Browder Story, also took Michael Novogratz to visit a New York City jail after Novogratz watched the film and had a desire to learn more.

At its founding, REFORM established a goal to reduce the number of people impacted by probation and parole laws by one million over the course of five years.

In September 2020, California enacted Assembly Bill 1950, which became the first legislation sponsored by REFORM Alliance to pass into law. The legislation limited probation terms and was part of the organization's broader efforts to reform probation and parole systems.

In 2023, Rubin, Mill, and Kay-Z hosted REFORM's inaugural Casino Night fundraiser, which raised $24 million for the organization.

== Leadership and governance ==
REFORM Alliance is governed by a board of directors composed of founders and other business and entertainment leaders, with Mill and Rubin serving as co-chairs. The board also includes Jay-Z, Kraft, Wu Tsai, Laura Arnold, Smith, Novogratz, Desiree Perez, Michael Rapino, and Emilia Fazzalari.

The organization's executive leadership is headed by Chief Executive Officer (CEO) Jessica Jackson, who was appointed the role in August 2024. Jackson succeeded Robert Rooks, who had served as CEO beginning in 2021 after replacing the organization's inaugural CEO, Van Jones.

== Work ==
REFORM Alliance focuses on passing legislation to reform the probation and parole laws in the United States. The organization works alongside other criminal justice groups such as Cut50 and the American Conservative Union.

REFORM has helped to pass legislation in California, Michigan, Louisiana, and Virginia. REFORM has worked with numerous celebrities and executives, including Kim Kardashian, Madonna, and Jack Dorsey.

During the COVID-19 pandemic, REFORM helped distribute 12.5 million masks and personal protective equipment to prisons across the United States for incarcerated persons as well as correctional officers. In May 2020, Jack Dorsey donated $10 million to REFORM to help provide personal protective equipment to incarcerated persons.

In September 2020, the first REFORM Alliance-supported legislation passed, when California Governor Gavin Newsom signed Assembly Bill 1950 into law.

=== California ===
In California, REFORM Alliance works closely with the American Conservative Union, Californians for Safety and Justice, Cut50, and Dream Corps. REFORM helped to pass AB 1950, AB 3234, and SB 118. AB 1950 was REFORM Alliance's first major "legislative victory", which REFORM worked on alongside Assemblywoman Sydney Kamlager-Dove.

AB 1950 is designed to lower recidivism rates by shortening probation terms across California. It reduced probationary periods from three years to one for misdemeanors, and from five years to two for most felonies. The legislation is expected to decrease California's probation population by thirty-three percent, and in 2020 was considered one of the most transformative probation reform laws in the country.

=== Michigan ===
Michigan had the sixth-highest rate of probation supervision, leading REFORM to support legislation in the state. REFORM worked to pass SB 1048, SB 1050, and SB 1051, bipartisan probation reform laws, through the Michigan State Legislature, which passed on January 4, 2021. The laws reduced adult felony probation sentences in Michigan from five years to three years, and prevented endless extensions on misdemeanor and felony probation terms.

The laws limit jail sanctions for technical probation violations, and require parole supervision terms to be tailored to a person's individualized risks and needs. In January 2021, the laws were expected to lower Michigan's caseload by 8.4 percent.

=== Louisiana ===
In Louisiana, REFORM helped to pass HB 77 and HB 643. REFORM advocated for HB 77 to create a remote reporting system for people on probation, since people on probation often have to leave work in order to meet with their probation officers.

=== Virginia ===
In 2021, alongside Justice Forward VA, the American Conservative Union, and Faith and Freedom, REFORM worked to pass HB 2038. The law creates a system of graduated sanctions for technical probation violations, which prevents people from being re-incarcerated for a first-time technical probation violation. If there are additional technical violations, the court must first find that there is no other safe and a less-restrictive way to deter the conduct, before imposing a term of incarceration.

== See also ==
- Kalief Browder
