= Craig McLean =

British swimmer (born 1998)

Personal information
- Full name: Craig Ross McLean
- Born: 25 October 1998 (age 27) Livingston, Scotland
- Height: 6 ft 4 in (1.93 m)
- Weight: 85 kg (187 lb)
- Relative: Rachel McLean (Sister)

Sport
- Sport: Swimming
- Strokes: Freestyle
- Club: University of Stirling
Medal record
Men's swimming
Representing Great Britain
European Championships (LC)
Bronze medal – third place	2018 Glasgow	4×200m mixed freestyle
Representing Scotland
Commonwealth Games
Bronze medal – third place	2018 Gold Coast	4×100 m freestyle

Craig McLean (born 25 October 1998) is a British swimmer from Livingston, Scotland. McLean attended Deans Community High School before subsequently attending the University of Stirling. McLean made his senior debut for Scotland at the 2018 Commonwealth Games while making his debut for Great Britain at the 2018 European Championships. In February, 2020, McLean announced his retirement from professional swimming at the age of 22. He has one sibling, Rachel McLean.

== Career ==
McLean won silver in the boys' 100m freestyle at the 2015 Commonwealth Youth Games.

As a senior, he represented Scotland at the 2018 Commonwealth Games in Gold Coast, where he won a bronze medal in the men's 4 × 100 metre freestyle relay.

At the 2018 European Championships, McLean was part of the British team that won bronze in the mixed 4 × 200 metre freestyle relay, a new event at the games.
