= Marius Zobel =

Swimmer

Personal information
- Nationality: German
- Born: 18 November 1999 (age 26) Magdeburg, Germany

Sport
- Sport: Swimming
- Strokes: Freestyle
Medal record
European Championships (LC)
Gold medal – first place	2018 Glasgow	4×200 m mixed freestyle
World University Games
Bronze medal – third place	2021 Chengdu	200 m medley

Marius Zobel (born 18 November 1999) is a German swimmer.

He competed in the 4 × 200 m mixed freestyle relay event at the 2018 European Aquatics Championships, winning the gold medal.
