= Lorna Doorman =

Zimbabwean swimmer (born 1998)

Personal information
- Nationality: Zimbabwean
- Born: 15 April 1998 (age 28)

Sport
- Sport: Swimming

Lorna Doorman (born 15 April 1998) is a Zimbabwean swimmer. She competed in the women's 200 metre freestyle event at the 2018 FINA World Swimming Championships (25 m), in Hangzhou, China.
