= Steven Kent (swimmer) =

New Zealand swimmer & surf lifesaver

Personal information
- Born: 3 January 1988 (age 38) Levin, New Zealand

Sport
- Sport: Swimming
Medal record
Men's lifesaving
Representing New Zealand
The World Games
Bronze medal – third place	2017 Wrocław	200m Obstacle

Steven Kent (born 3 January 1988 in Levin) is a New Zealand swimmer. He competed in the 4 × 200 metre freestyle relay event at the 2012 Summer Olympics.

Five years later, he competed at the 2017 World Games winning a bronze medal in lifesaving.

He represented New Zealand in Surf Life Saving at the 2008, 2010, 2012, 2014, 2016, 2018 & 2022 World Lifesaving Championships. Winning in 2012, 2014 and 2016. He was captain on the team in 2018 and 2022.

Kent's older brother Dean was also a New Zealand Olympic representative swimmer.
