= Anouchka Martin =

French swimmer

Personal information
- Nationality: French
- Born: 5 February 1993 (age 33)

Sport
- Sport: Swimming
- Strokes: Freestyle
Medal record
European Championships (LC)
Gold medal – first place	2018 Glasgow	4×100 m freestyle
Bronze medal – third place	2020 Budapest	4×100 m freestyle
European Championships (SC)
Gold medal – first place	2019 Glasgow	4×50 m freestyle

Anouchka Martin (born 5 February 1993) is a French swimmer. She competed in the women's 4 × 100 metre freestyle relay event at the 2018 European Aquatics Championships, winning the gold medal.
