= Arina Openysheva =

Russian swimmer (born 1999)

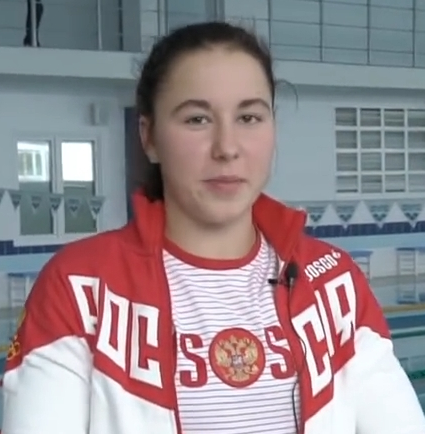
- Arina Openysheva in November 2016

Personal information
- Full name: Arina Openysheva
- National team: Russia
- Born: 24 March 1999 (age 27) Zelenogorsk, Krasnoyarsk Krai, Russia
- Height: 1.61 m (5 ft 3 in)
- Weight: 48 kg (106 lb)

Sport
- Sport: Swimming
- Strokes: Freestyle, Medley
- College team: University of Louisville
- Coach: Vladimir Avdeev
Medal record
Women's swimming
Representing Russia
World Championships (SC)
Bronze medal – third place	2016 Windsor	4x200 m freestyle
European Championships (LC)
Gold medal – first place	2018 Glasgow	4×100 m medley
Silver medal – second place	2018 Glasgow	4×200 m freestyle
Bronze medal – third place	2018 Glasgow	4×100 m mixed freestyle
Summer Universiade
Gold medal – first place	2017 Taipei	4×200 m freestyle
Silver medal – second place	2017 Taipei	4×100 m freestyle
Bronze medal – third place	2017 Taipei	100 m freestyle
Bronze medal – third place	2017 Taipei	200 m freestyle
European Games
Gold medal – first place	2015 Baku	200 m freestyle
Gold medal – first place	2015 Baku	400 m freestyle
Gold medal – first place	2015 Baku	4×100 m freestyle
Gold medal – first place	2015 Baku	4×200 m freestyle
Gold medal – first place	2015 Baku	4×100 m medley
Gold medal – first place	2015 Baku	4×100 m mixed freestyle
Gold medal – first place	2015 Baku	4×100 m mixed medley
Silver medal – second place	2015 Baku	100 m freestyle
World Junior Championships
Gold medal – first place	2015 Singapore	4×100 m mixed medley
Silver medal – second place	2015 Singapore	200 m freestyle
Silver medal – second place	2015 Singapore	4×100 m freestyle
Bronze medal – third place	2015 Singapore	100 m freestyle
Bronze medal – third place	2015 Singapore	4×200 m freestyle
Bronze medal – third place	2015 Singapore	4×100 m mixed freestyle
European Junior Championships
Gold medal – first place	2014 Dordrecht	100 m freestyle
Gold medal – first place	2014 Dordrecht	200 m freestyle
Gold medal – first place	2014 Dordrecht	400 m freestyle
Gold medal – first place	2014 Dordrecht	4×100 m freestyle
Gold medal – first place	2014 Dordrecht	4×200 m freestyle
Gold medal – first place	2014 Dordrecht	4×100 m medley
Gold medal – first place	2014 Dordrecht	4×100 m mixed freestyle
European Youth Olympic Festival
Gold medal – first place	2013 Utrecht	100 m freestyle
Gold medal – first place	2013 Utrecht	200 m freestyle
Gold medal – first place	2013 Utrecht	400 m freestyle
Gold medal – first place	2013 Utrecht	800 m freestyle
Gold medal – first place	2013 Utrecht	4×100 m freestyle
Gold medal – first place	2013 Utrecht	4×100 m medley
Gold medal – first place	2013 Utrecht	4×100 m mixed freestyle
Gold medal – first place	2013 Utrecht	4×100 m mixed medley

Arina Pavlovna Openysheva (Russian: Арина Павловна Опёнышева; born 24 March 1999) is a Russian competitive swimmer. She won eight medals at the 2015 European Games. Seven medals were gold (200 m freestyle, 400 m freestyle, 4 × 100 m freestyle, 4 × 200 m freestyle, 4 × 100 m medley, 4 × 100 m mixed freestyle, 4 × 100 m mixed medley) making her the most decorated athlete of the Games.

== Career ==
In 2013, Openysheva competed at the 2013 European Youth Summer Olympic Festival taking 8 gold medals overall in (100 m, 200 m, 400 m, 800 m, 4 × 100 m freestyle, 4 × 100 m medley, 4 × 100 m mixed freestyle and 4 × 100 m mixed medley).

In 2014, at the 2014 European Junior Championships, Openysheva won 8 gold medals in (100 m, 200 m, 400 m freestyle, 4 × 100 m freestyle, 4 × 200 m freestyle, 4 × 100 m medley, 4 × 100 m mixed freestyle and 4 × 100 m mixed medley). That same year, she competed in seniors at the 2014 European Championships and at the 2014 FINA World Swimming Championships (25 m) in Doha, Qatar.

In June 2015, 16-year-old Openysheva competed at the inaugural 2015 European Games in Baku, she won seven gold medals including in 200 m freestyle, 400 m freestyle, and helping the Russian Team win gold in 4 × 200 m freestyle, 4 × 100 m mixed medley, 4 × 100 m mixed freestyle, 4 × 100 m freestyle and in 4 × 100 m medley (together with Mariia Kameneva, Maria Astashkina, Polina Egorova broke a new junior world record touching in at 4:03.22). She won silver in 100 m freestyle behind Dutch Marrit Steenbergen. Openysheva was the most decorated athlete at the entire 2015 European Games.

In 2–9 August, Openysheva competed in seniors at the 2015 World Championships in Kazan, however she did not reach the semifinals in her events after losing in the preliminary heats. She also competed at the FINA Swimming World Cup in Moscow, finishing 4th in the women's 100 m freestyle behind Veronika Popova.

In 25–30 August, Openysheva then competed at the 2015 World Junior Swimming Championships in Singapore, she won gold in 4 × 100 m mixed medley (with Anton Chupkov, Irina Pridhoko and Daniil Pakhomov) were Russia threw in a new Junior World record touching in at 3:45.85, she won silver medals in 4 × 100 m freestyle and 200 m freestyle, bronze medals in 100 m freestyle, 4 × 100 m mixed freestyle and 4 × 200 m freestyle.
