= Holly Hibbott =

British swimmer (born 1999)

Personal information
- Nationality: British
- Born: 13 December 1999 (age 26) Southport

Sport
- Sport: Swimming
- Strokes: Freestyle
Medal record
Women's swimming
Representing Great Britain
European Championships (LC)
Gold medal – first place	2018 Glasgow	4×200 m freestyle
Gold medal – first place	2020 Budapest	4×200 m freestyle
Silver medal – second place	2022 Rome	4×200 m freestyle
Bronze medal – third place	2018 Glasgow	400 m freestyle
Bronze medal – third place	2018 Glasgow	4×200 m mixed freestyle
European Games
Gold medal – first place	2015 Baku	800 m freestyle
Bronze medal – third place	2015 Baku	4 x 100 m freestyle
Bronze medal – third place	2015 Baku	4 x 200 m freestyle
Representing England
Commonwealth Games
Silver medal – second place	2018 Gold Coast	400 m freestyle
Bronze medal – third place	2018 Gold Coast	4×200 m freestyle relay

Holly Hibbott (born 13 December 1999) is a British swimmer, who has won two gold medals in the relay events at the European Championships.

== Career ==
Hibbott competed in the women's 400 metre freestyle event at the 2017 World Aquatics Championships. At the 2018 Commonwealth Games, she won silver in the 400 metre freestyle and bronze in the 4×200 m freestyle relay events.

Hibbott won the 400 metres freestyle at the 2024 Aquatics GB Swimming Championships but missed out on a place at the 2024 Summer Olympics.
