= Jessica Jackson =

American human rights lawyer and advocate

- Born: Jessica Hurst; January 20, 1982 (age 44); Alabama
- Citizenship: American
- Education: Santa Clara University School of Law
- Occupations: Human rights attorney Activist; Politician
- Organization(s): REFORM Alliance #cut50 American Constitution Society
- Children: 2

Jessica Jackson is an American human rights attorney and chief executive officer at REFORM Alliance. She is also the co-founder of Dream Corps JUSTICE, a national bipartisan effort aimed at reducing America's incarceration rate. She was the youngest mayor of the city of Mill Valley.

== Early life and education ==
Jackson was raised in Mill Valley, California. She attended Hyde School in Woodstock, Connecticut, where she was nominated to the school's inaugural Alumni Hall of Honor in 2016. At age 18, Jackson dropped out of high school and received her GED.

When Jackson was 22, her then-husband was sentenced to six years in prison for a nonviolent drug offense. Jackson had a newborn baby and no job, so she moved in with her mother. Her husband's prison sentence motivated her to go to college and law school so that she could become a lawyer and fight for families like her own.

Jackson received her bachelor's degree in Political Science and English from the Honors College of the University of South Florida. In 2011, she received her J.D. from Santa Clara University School of Law, where she received the Dean's Leadership Award.

== Career ==
Jessica Jackson was elected to the Mill Valley City Council in November 2013, becoming the youngest ever elected official in Marin County. In 2015, she was rotated in off of City Council (not an election, as City Council rotates Mayoral terms), as Mayor of Mill Valley. In addition to her duties on the Mill Valley City Council, Jackson was Mill Valley's representative to the Association of Bay Area Governments. She also was a board member of the American Constitution Society Bay Area chapter.

Jackson began her career as a human rights attorney at the Habeas Corpus Resource Center in San Francisco, California, where she represented California death row inmates in their appeals. Jackson met Van Jones during a chance meeting and began talking with him and a law school friend, Matt Haney, about criminal justice reform. Over breakfast they scribbled ideas on a napkin which later led to the formation of #cut50. In 2015, she joined with Jones to co-found #cut50, an organization focused on bipartisan solutions to criminal justice reform issues. While leading her national initiative, #cut50, Jessica helped ban the shackling of jailed pregnant women in 14 states. Her “Dignity for Incarcerated Women” campaign enlisted formerly incarcerated women and dozens of celebrities to deepen the focus on women's issues. At the helm of #cut50, Jessica built the biggest national grassroots network for bipartisan reform, #cut50's Empathy Network. She also produced the first-ever Bipartisan Criminal Justice Summit, attracting leaders as diverse as Newt Gingrich and then Attorney General Eric Holder. Jackson handed over her leadership role at #cut50 to focus on her job at Reform Alliance, but is in a supportive role at #cut50.

Jackson worked with #cut50, members of Congress, and the Trump Administration to develop and pass the First Step Act of 2018.

In 2019 she stepped down from the Mill Valley Council and moved to Alexandria, Virginia, to become the Chief Advocacy Officer at Reform Alliance, an organization committed to reforming supervision laws across the country. She is tutoring Kim Kardashian in law.

Jackson is chief executive officer of REFORM Alliance.

== Recognition ==
Jackson has received several awards and accolades. She is the recipient of the 2017 John Kable, QC, Memorial Young Justice Professional Award, the 2018 ACLU Benjamin Dreyfus Civil Liberties Award, the 2019 Alexander Law Prize from Santa Clara University and the 2019 American Constitution Society Fearless Advocate Award. She is a 2021 World Economic Forum Young Global Leader.
