= Emily Gantriis =

Danish swimmer (born 1999)

Personal information
- Nationality: Danish
- Born: 29 May 1999 (age 27)

Sport
- Sport: Swimming
- Strokes: Freestyle
Medal record
European Championships (LC)
Bronze medal – third place	2018 Glasgow	4×100 m freestyle relay
European Championships (SC)
Bronze medal – third place	2019 Glasgow	4×50 m mixed medley

Emily Gantriis (born 29 May 1999) is a Danish swimmer. She competed in the women's 4 × 100 metre freestyle relay event at the 2018 European Aquatics Championships, winning the bronze medal.
