= Viktoriya Andreyeva =

Russian swimmer

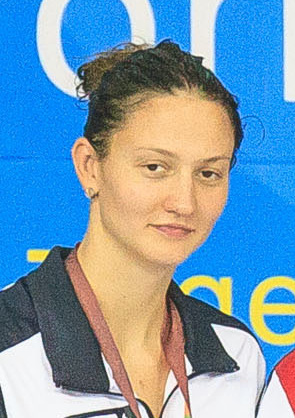
- Andreyeva at the 2015 Military World Games

Personal information
- Nationality: Russian
- Born: 21 June 1992 (age 34) Saint Petersburg, Russia
- Height: 189 cm (6 ft 2 in)
- Weight: 76 kg (168 lb)

Sport
- Sport: Swimming
- Strokes: Freestyle, medley
Medal record
Representing Russia
European Championships (LC)
Silver medal – second place	2018 Glasgow	4×200 m mixed freestyle
Silver medal – second place	2018 Glasgow	4×100 m mixed medley
Military World Games
Silver medal – second place	2015 Mungyeong	100 m freestyle

Viktoriya Andreyeva (born 21 June 1992) is a Russian swimmer. At the 2012 Summer Olympics, she competed for the national team in the 4×100 metre freestyle relay, finishing in 10th place in the heats and failing to reach the final.
