= Irina Krivonogova =

Russian swimmer (born 2000)

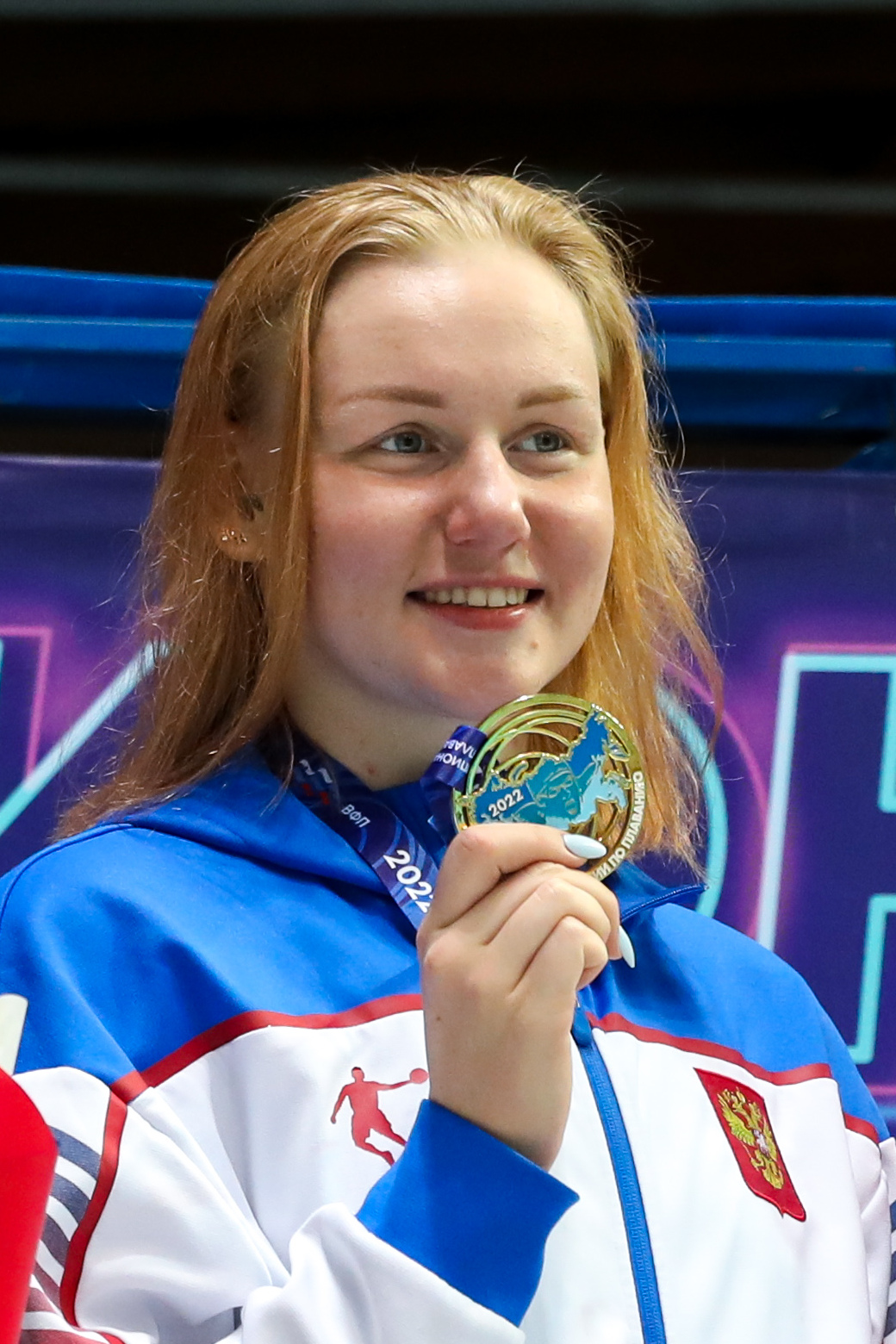

Personal information
- Full name: Irina Andreyevna Krivonogova
- Nationality: Russian
- Born: 3 May 2000 (age 26) Novokuibyshevsk, Russia

Sport
- Sport: Swimming
- Strokes: Freestyle
Medal record
European Championships (LC)
Silver medal – second place	2018 Glasgow	4×200m freestyle
Silver medal – second place	2018 Glasgow	4×200m mixed freestyle
Summer Universiade
Bronze medal – third place	2019 Naples	4×200 m freestyle
Military World Games
Silver medal – second place	2019 Wuhan	4×100 m freestyle
Silver medal – second place	2019 Wuhan	4×100 m mixed freestyle

Irina Andreyevna Krivonogova (Russian: Ирина Андреевна Кривоногова; born 3 May 2000) is a Russian swimmer.

She competed in the 2018 European Aquatics Championships, winning silver medal in both the 4 × 200 m women's freestyle relay and the 4 × 200 m mixed freestyle relay.
