= Charlotte Bonnet =

French swimmer (born 1995)

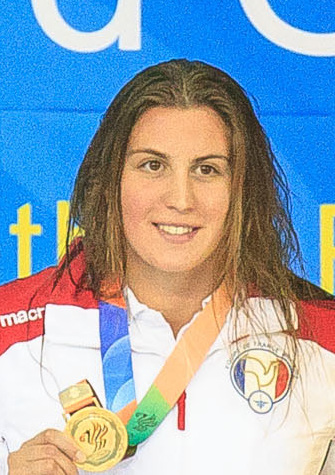
- Bonnet in 2015

Personal information
- Full name: Charlotte Laëtitia Julie Bonnet Desplanches
- National team: France
- Born: Charlotte Laëtitia Julie Bonnet; 14 February 1995 (age 31) Enghien-les-Bains, France
- Height: 1.74 m (5 ft 9 in)
- Weight: 61 kg (134 lb)

Sport
- Sport: Swimming
- Strokes: Freestyle
- Club: Energy Standard
Medal record
Women's swimming
Representing France
Olympic Games
Bronze medal – third place	2012 London	4×200 m freestyle
World Championships (LC)
Bronze medal – third place	2013 Barcelona	4×200 m freestyle
Bronze medal – third place	2019 Gwangju	4×100 m mixed freestyle
World Championships (SC)
Bronze medal – third place	2014 Doha	4×50 m medley
European Championships (LC)
Gold medal – first place	2018 Glasgow	200 m freestyle
Gold medal – first place	2018 Glasgow	4×100 m freestyle
Gold medal – first place	2018 Glasgow	4×100 m mixed freestyle
Gold medal – first place	2022 Rome	4×100 m mixed freestyle
Silver medal – second place	2022 Rome	100 m freestyle
Silver medal – second place	2022 Rome	4×200 m mixed freestyle
Silver medal – second place	2022 Rome	4×100 m medley
Bronze medal – third place	2016 London	200 m freestyle
Bronze medal – third place	2016 London	4×100 m mixed freestyle
Bronze medal – third place	2018 Glasgow	100 m freestyle
Bronze medal – third place	2020 Budapest	4×100m freestyle
European Championships (SC)
Gold medal – first place	2012 Chartres	4×50 m mixed freestyle
Gold medal – first place	2017 Copenhagen	200 m freestyle
Silver medal – second place	2012 Chartres	200 m freestyle
Silver medal – second place	2013 Herning	200 m freestyle
Bronze medal – third place	2012 Chartres	100 m freestyle
Bronze medal – third place	2017 Copenhagen	4×50 m medley
Bronze medal – third place	2017 Copenhagen	4×50 m mixed medley
European Junior Championships
Gold medal – first place	2011 Belgrade	100 m freestyle
Gold medal – first place	2011 Belgrade	4×100 m freestyle

Charlotte Laëtitia Julie Bonnet Desplanches (née Bonnet; born 14 February 1995) is a French former swimmer, who won a bronze medal at the 2012 Summer Olympics. Bonnet was born in Enghien-les-Bains, Paris. Her 4 × 200 m freestyle team won the bronze medal in a time of 7:47.49 (Camille Muffat 1:55.51; Bonnet 1:57.78; Ophélie-Cyrielle Étienne 1:58.05; Coralie Balmy 1:56.15).

On 1 January 2013, Bonnet was made a Knight (Chevalier) of the French National Order of Merit.

== International Swimming League ==
In the Autumn of 2019 she was member of the inaugural International Swimming League swimming for the Energy Standard International Swim Club, who won the team title in Las Vegas, Nevada, in December. In the Las Vegas final, she won the 200m Freestyle with a time of 1:52.88.

== Personal life ==
Bonnet is married to Swiss swimmer Jérémy Desplanches.

== See also ==
- List of European Short Course Swimming Championships medalists (women)
