= Rika Omoto =

Japanese swimmer (born 1997)

Personal information
- Nationality: Japanese
- Born: 8 May 1997 (age 29) Kyoto, Japan

Sport
- Sport: Swimming
- Strokes: Freestyle, medley
Medal record
Representing Japan
Universiade
Bronze medal – third place	2017 Taipei	4×200 m freestyle

Rika Omoto (大本 里佳, Ōmoto Rika; born 8 May 1997) is a Japanese swimmer. She competed in the women's 200 metre individual medley at the 2019 World Aquatics Championships held in Gwangju, South Korea. She also competed in the women's 50 metre freestyle and women's 100 metre freestyle events. In both events she did not advance to compete in the semi-finals. She represented Japan at the 2020 Summer Olympics.
