= Margaux Fabre =

French swimmer (born 1992)

Personal information
- Nationality: French
- Born: 2 October 1992 (age 34) Perpignan, France

Sport
- Sport: Swimming
- Strokes: Freestyle
Medal record
Women's swimming
Representing France
European Championships (LC)
Gold medal – first place	2018 Glasgow	4×100 m freestyle
Gold medal – first place	2018 Glasgow	4×100 m mixed freestyle
The World Games
Gold medal – first place	2017 Wrocław	4x50m Obstacle Relay
Bronze medal – third place	2017 Wrocław	200m Obstacle

Margaux Nicole Jeanne Aude Fabre (born 2 October 1992) is a French former swimmer. She competed in the women's 4 × 200 metre freestyle relay event at the 2016 Summer Olympics. Fabre also competed in lifesaving at the 2017 World Games, winning two medals.
