= Ellie Faulkner =

British swimmer (born 1993)

Personal information
- Full name: Eleanor Jane Faulkner
- Nickname: "Ellie"
- National team: Great Britain; England
- Born: 5 January 1993 (age 33) Sheffield, England
- Height: 1.65 m (5 ft 5 in)
- Weight: 55 kg (121 lb)

Sport
- Sport: Swimming
- Strokes: Freestyle
- Club: City of Sheffield SC
Medal record
Women's swimming
Representing England
Commonwealth Games
Bronze medal – third place	2018 Gold Coast	400 m freestyle
Bronze medal – third place	2018 Gold Coast	4×100 m freestyle relay
Bronze medal – third place	2018 Gold Coast	4×200 m freestyle relay
Bronze medal – third place	2014 Glasgow	4×200 m freestyle relay
European Championships (LC)
Gold medal – first place	2018 Glasgow	4×200 m freestyle

Eleanor Jane Faulkner (born 5 January 1993) is an English competitive swimmer who represented Great Britain in the Olympic Games, and England in the Commonwealth Games. At the 2012 Summer Olympics, she competed in the women's 800-metre freestyle, finishing in 22nd place overall in the heats, and not advancing to the final.
