= Laura Benková =

Slovak swimmer (born 2000)

Personal information
- Nationality: Slovak
- Born: 11 May 2000 (age 26)

Sport
- Sport: Swimming

Laura Benková (born 11 May 2000) is a Slovak swimmer. She competed in the women's 200 metre freestyle event at the 2018 FINA World Swimming Championships (25 m), in Hangzhou, China.
