= Anastasia Guzhenkova =

Russian swimmer

Personal information
- Nationality: Russian
- Born: 16 August 1997 (age 28)

Sport
- Sport: Swimming
- Strokes: Freestyle
Medal record
Women's swimming
Representing Russia
European Championships (LC)
Silver medal – second place	2018 Glasgow	4×200 m freestyle
Silver medal – second place	2018 Glasgow	4×200 m mixed freestyle
Bronze medal – third place	2018 Glasgow	200 m freestyle
Summer Universiade
Gold medal – first place	2017 Taipei	4×200 m freestyle
Silver medal – second place	2017 Taipei	4×100 m freestyle
Military World Games
Silver medal – second place	2019 Wuhan	4×100 m freestyle
Silver medal – second place	2019 Wuhan	4×100 m medley
Silver medal – second place	2019 Wuhan	4×100 m mixed freestyle
Bronze medal – third place	2019 Wuhan	200 m freestyle

Anastasia Dmitrievna Guzhenkova (Russian: Анастасия Дмитриевна Гуженкова; born 16 August 1997) is a Russian swimmer. She competed in the women's 200 metre freestyle event at the 2017 World Aquatics Championships.
