= Marjolein Delno =

Dutch swimmer (born 1994)

Personal information
- Nationality: Dutch
- Born: 17 March 1994 (age 32)

Sport
- Sport: Swimming
- Strokes: Freestyle
Medal record
European Championships (LC)
Silver medal – second place	2018 Glasgow	4×100 m freestyle

Marjolein Delno (born 17 March 1994) is a Dutch swimmer. She competed in the women's 200 metre individual medley event at the 2017 World Aquatics Championships.
