= 2018 European Aquatics Championships =

Water sport competitions

34th European Aquatics Championships 1st European Sports Championships
- Host city: Glasgow, Edinburgh & Luss, United Kingdom
- Date(s): 3–12 August 2018
- Venue(s): Tollcross International Swimming Centre (swimming); Royal Commonwealth Pool (diving); Scotstoun Sports Campus (synchronised); Loch Lomond (open-water)
- Nations participating: 48

The 2018 European Aquatics Championships took place in Glasgow, Edinburgh and Luss in the central belt of Scotland, from 3 to 12 August 2018.

The championships were part of the first European Championships with other events happening in Scotland and Berlin.

== Venue ==
The Tollcross International Swimming Centre hosted the swimming events with the diving being hosted by the Royal Commonwealth Pool in Edinburgh. The open water swimming competition took place at Loch Lomond, while Scotstoun Sports Campus hosted the synchronised swimming events.

== Schedule ==
Competition dates by discipline were:

- Swimming: 3–9 August
- Diving: 6–12 August
- Open water swimming: 8–12 August
- Synchro: 3–7 August

== Overall medal table ==
Host nation

Rank	Nation	Gold	Silver	Bronze	Total
1	Russia	23	15	9	47
2	Great Britain*	13	12	9	34
3	Italy	8	12	19	39
4	Hungary	6	4	2	12
5	Ukraine	5	6	2	13
6	Netherlands	5	5	2	12
7	France	4	2	6	12
8	Sweden	4	0	0	4
9	Germany	3	6	10	19
10	Switzerland	1	0	1	2
11	Denmark	0	3	1	4
12	Lithuania	0	2	0	2
13	Spain	0	1	4	5
14	Greece	0	1	1	2
14	Poland	0	1	1	2
16	Norway	0	1	0	1
16	Romania	0	1	0	1
18	Armenia	0	0	1	1
18	Belgium	0	0	1	1
18	Finland	0	0	1	1
18	Ireland	0	0	1	1
18	Slovenia	0	0	1	1
Totals (22 entries)		72	72	72	216

== Swimming ==
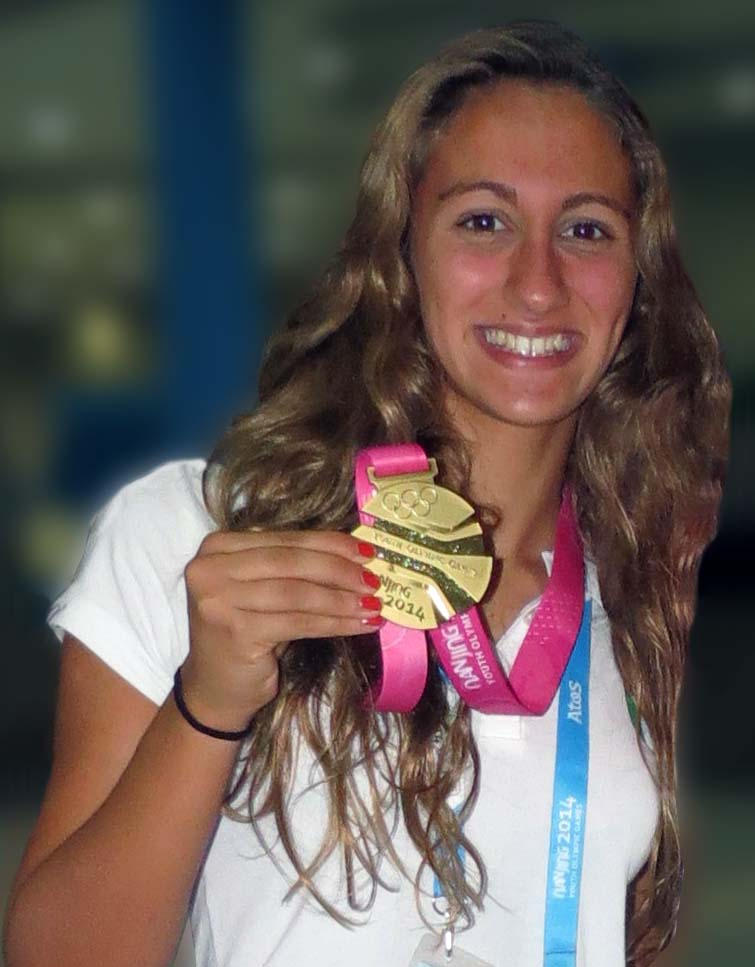
Simona Quadarella of Italy won three individual gold medals at the 2018 European Aquatics Championships.

=== Medal table ===
Host nation

Rank	Nation	Gold	Silver	Bronze	Total
1	Russia	10	10	6	26
2	Great Britain*	9	7	8	24
3	Italy	6	5	11	22
4	Hungary	4	3	2	9
5	France	4	1	2	7
6	Sweden	4	0	0	4
7	Ukraine	3	1	0	4
8	Germany	2	2	4	8
9	Switzerland	1	0	1	2
10	Netherlands	0	4	1	5
11	Denmark	0	3	1	4
12	Lithuania	0	2	0	2
13	Greece	0	1	1	2
13	Poland	0	1	1	2
13	Spain	0	1	1	2
16	Norway	0	1	0	1
16	Romania	0	1	0	1
18	Belgium	0	0	1	1
18	Finland	0	0	1	1
18	Ireland	0	0	1	1
18	Slovenia	0	0	1	1
Totals (21 entries)		43	43	43	129

=== Men ===
Event	Gold		Silver		Bronze	
50 m freestyle	Ben Proud; Great Britain	21.34	Kristian Golomeev; Greece	21.44 NR	Andrea Vergani; Italy	21.68
100 m freestyle	Alessandro Miressi; Italy	48.01	Duncan Scott; Great Britain	48.23	Mehdy Metella; France	48.24
200 m freestyle	Duncan Scott; Great Britain	1:45.34	Danas Rapšys; Lithuania	1:46.07	Mikhail Dovgalyuk; Russia	1:46.15
400 m freestyle	Mykhailo Romanchuk; Ukraine	3:45.18 NR	Henrik Christiansen; Norway	3:47.07	Henning Mühlleitner; Germany	3:47.18
800 m freestyle	Mykhailo Romanchuk; Ukraine	7:42.96 NR	Gregorio Paltrinieri; Italy	7:45.12	Florian Wellbrock; Germany	7:45.60 NR
1500 m freestyle	Florian Wellbrock; Germany	14:36.15 NR	Mykhailo Romanchuk; Ukraine	14:36.88 NR	Gregorio Paltrinieri; Italy	14:42.85
50 m backstroke	Kliment Kolesnikov; Russia	24.00 WR	Robert Glință; Romania	24.55	Shane Ryan; Ireland	24.64
100 m backstroke	Kliment Kolesnikov; Russia	52.53 WJ, NR	Evgeny Rylov; Russia	52.74	Apostolos Christou; Greece	53.72
200 m backstroke	Evgeny Rylov; Russia	1:53.36 ER	Radosław Kawęcki; Poland	1:56.07	Matteo Restivo; Italy	1:56.29 NR
50 m breaststroke	Adam Peaty; Great Britain	26.09 CR	Fabio Scozzoli; Italy	26.79	Peter Stevens; Slovenia	27.06
100 m breaststroke	Adam Peaty; Great Britain	57.10 WR	James Wilby; Great Britain	58.64	Anton Chupkov; Russia	59.06
200 m breaststroke	Anton Chupkov; Russia	2:06.80 ER	James Wilby; Great Britain	2:08.39	Luca Pizzini; Italy	2:08.54
50 m butterfly	Andriy Govorov; Ukraine	22.48 CR	Ben Proud; Great Britain	22.78	Oleg Kostin; Russia	22.97 NR
100 m butterfly	Piero Codia; Italy	50.64 CR, NR	Mehdy Metella; France	51.24	James Guy; Great Britain	51.42
200 m butterfly	Kristóf Milák; Hungary	1:52.79 CR	Tamás Kenderesi; Hungary	1:54.36	Federico Burdisso; Italy	1:55.97
200 m individual medley	Jérémy Desplanches; Switzerland	1:57.04	Philip Heintz; Germany	1:57.83	Max Litchfield; Great Britain	1:57.96
400 m individual medley	Dávid Verrasztó; Hungary	4:10.65	Max Litchfield; Great Britain	4:11.00	Joan Lluis Pons; Spain	4:14.26
4 × 100 m freestyle relay	Russia; Evgeny Rylov (48.62); Danila Izotov (48.61); Vladimir Morozov (47.61); Kliment Kolesnikov (47.39); Vladislav Grinev^{[a]} Ivan Kuzmenko^{[a]} Sergey Fesikov^{[a]} Andrey Zhilkin^{[a]}	3:12.23	Italy; Luca Dotto (48.63); Ivano Vendrame (48.73); Lorenzo Zazzeri (48.55); Alessandro Miressi (46.99)	3:12.90	Poland; Jan Świtkowski (48.68); Konrad Czerniak (49.04); Jakub Kraska (48.07); Kacper Majchrzak (48.41); Jan Hołub^{[a]}	3:14.20
4 × 200 m freestyle relay	Great Britain; Calum Jarvis (1:47.17); Duncan Scott (1:45.48); Thomas Dean (1:47.07); James Guy (1:45.60); Stephen Milne^{[a]} Cameron Kurle^{[a]}	7:05.32 CR	Russia; Mikhail Vekovishchev (1:46.78); Martin Malyutin (1:46.84); Danila Izotov (1:46.86); Mikhail Dovgalyuk (1:46.18); Viacheslav Andrusenko^{[a]}	7:06.66	Italy; Alessio Proietti Colonna (1:48.20); Filippo Megli (1:45.44); Matteo Ciampi (1:46.49); Mattia Zuin (1:47.45); Stefano Di Cola^{[a]}	7:07.58
4 × 100 m medley relay	Great Britain; Nicholas Pyle (54.58); Adam Peaty (57.60); James Guy (50.91); Duncan Scott (47.35); Brodie Williams^{[a]} James Wilby^{[a]} Jacob Peters^{[a]}	3:30.44 CR	Russia; Kliment Kolesnikov (52.77); Anton Chupkov (1:00.40); Egor Kuimov (51.42); Vladimir Morozov (47.44); Evgeny Rylov^{[a]} Kirill Prigoda^{[a]} Aleksandr Sadovnikov^{[a]} Vladislav Grinev^{[a]}	3:32.03	Germany; Christian Diener (54.19); Fabian Schwingenschlögl (1:00.00); Marius Kusch (51.58); Damian Wierling (47.75); Jan-Philip Glania^{[a]} Philip Heintz^{[a]}	3:33.52

^{a} Swimmers who participated in the heats only and received medals.

=== Women ===
Event	Gold		Silver		Bronze	
50 m freestyle	Sarah Sjöström; Sweden	23.74 CR	Pernille Blume; Denmark	23.75 NR	Ranomi Kromowidjojo; Netherlands	24.21
100 m freestyle	Sarah Sjöström; Sweden	52.93	Femke Heemskerk; Netherlands	53.23	Charlotte Bonnet; France	53.35
200 m freestyle	Charlotte Bonnet; France	1:54.95 CR	Femke Heemskerk; Netherlands	1:56.72	Anastasia Guzhenkova; Russia	1:56.77
400 m freestyle	Simona Quadarella; Italy	4:03.35	Ajna Késely; Hungary	4:03.57 EJ	Holly Hibbott; Great Britain	4:05.01
800 metre freestyle	Simona Quadarella; Italy	8:16.45 NR	Ajna Késely; Hungary	8:22.01 EJ	Anna Egorova; Russia	8:24.71
1500 m freestyle	Simona Quadarella; Italy	15:51.61	Sarah Köhler; Germany	15:57.85	Ajna Késely; Hungary	16:03.22
50 m backstroke	Georgia Davies; Great Britain	27.23	Anastasia Fesikova; Russia	27.31	Mimosa Jallow; Finland	27.70
100 m backstroke	Anastasia Fesikova; Russia	59.19	Georgia Davies; Great Britain	59.36	Carlotta Zofkova; Italy	59.61
200 m backstroke	Margherita Panziera; Italy	2:06.18 CR, NR	Daria Ustinova; Russia	2:07.12	Katalin Burián; Hungary	2:07.43
50 m breaststroke	Yuliya Yefimova; Russia	29.81	Imogen Clark; Great Britain	30.34	Arianna Castiglioni; Italy	30.41
100 m breaststroke	Yuliya Yefimova; Russia	1:05.53 CR	Rūta Meilutytė; Lithuania	1:06.26	Arianna Castiglioni; Italy	1:06.54
200 m breaststroke	Yuliya Yefimova; Russia	2:21.32	Jessica Vall; Spain	2:23.01	Molly Renshaw; Great Britain	2:23.43
50 m butterfly	Sarah Sjöström; Sweden	25.16	Emilie Beckmann; Denmark	25.72	Kimberly Buys; Belgium	25.74
100 m butterfly	Sarah Sjöström; Sweden	56.23	Svetlana Chimrova; Russia	57.40	Elena Di Liddo; Italy	57.68
200 m butterfly	Boglárka Kapás; Hungary	2:07.13	Svetlana Chimrova; Russia	2:07.33	Alys Thomas; Great Britain	2:07.42
200 m individual medley	Katinka Hosszú; Hungary	2:10.17	Ilaria Cusinato; Italy	2:10.25	Maria Ugolkova; Switzerland	2:10.83
400 m individual medley	Fantine Lesaffre; France	4:34.17 NR	Ilaria Cusinato; Italy	4:35.05	Hannah Miley; Great Britain	4:35.34
4 × 100 m freestyle relay	France; Marie Wattel (54.35); Charlotte Bonnet (52.20); Margaux Fabre (54.41); Béryl Gastaldello (53.69); Anouchka Martin^{[b]} Assia Touati^{[b]}	3:34.65	Netherlands; Kim Busch (54.75); Femke Heemskerk (52.33); Kira Toussaint (54.47); Ranomi Kromowidjojo (53.22); Marjolein Delno^{[b]}	3:34.77	Denmark; Pernille Blume (52.83); Signe Bro (54.59); Julie Kepp Jensen (55.19); Mie Nielsen (54.42); Emily Gantriis^{[b]}	3:37.03
4 × 200 m freestyle relay	Great Britain; Ellie Faulkner (1:59.25); Kathryn Greenslade (1:57.94); Holly Hibbott (1:58.46); Freya Anderson (1:56.00); Lucy Hope^{[b]}	7:51.65	Russia; Valeriya Salamatina (1:58.72); Anna Egorova (1:58.18); Arina Openysheva (1:58.48); Anastasia Guzhenkova (1:57.49); Irina Krivonogova^{[b]}	7:52.87	Germany; Reva Foos (1:58.90); Isabel Marie Gose (1:58.22); Sarah Köhler (1:58.99); Annika Bruhn (1:57.65); Marie Pietruschka^{[b]}	7:53.76
4 × 100 m medley relay	Russia; Anastasia Fesikova (59.56); Yuliya Yefimova (1:03.95); Svetlana Chimrova (57.34); Maria Kameneva (53.37); Daria Ustinova^{[b]} Vitalina Simonova^{[b]} Arina Openysheva^{[b]}	3:54.22 CR	Denmark; Mie Nielsen (59.76); Rikke Møller Pedersen (1:07.50); Emilie Beckmann (57.66); Pernille Blume (51.77)	3:56.69	Great Britain; Georgia Davies (59.44); Siobhan-Marie O'Connor (1:07.22); Alys Thomas (57.56); Freya Anderson (52.69); Kathleen Dawson^{[b]}	3:56.91

^{b} Swimmers who participated in the heats only and received medals.

=== Mixed events ===
Event	Gold		Silver		Bronze	
4 × 100 m mixed freestyle relay	France; Jérémy Stravius (48.81); Mehdy Metella (47.45); Marie Wattel (53.47); Charlotte Bonnet (52.34); Maxime Grousset^{[c]} Margaux Fabre^{[c]} Béryl Gastaldello^{[c]}	3:22.07 CR	Netherlands; Nyls Korstanje (49.40); Stan Pijnenburg (48.74); Femke Heemskerk (52.62); Ranomi Kromowidjojo (53.21); Kyle Stolk^{[c]} Kira Toussaint^{[c]}	3:23.97	Russia; Kliment Kolesnikov (48.45); Vladislav Grinev (47.69); Maria Kameneva (53.90); Arina Openysheva (54.46); Danila Izotov^{[c]} Rozaliya Nasretdinova^{[c]}	3:24.50
4 × 200 m mixed freestyle relay	Germany; Jacob Heidtmann (1:46.52); Henning Mühlleitner (1:47.32); Reva Foos (1:58.25); Annika Bruhn (1:56.34); Marius Zobel^{[c]} Isabel Marie Gose^{[c]}	7:28.43 CR	Russia; Mikhail Vekovishchev (1:47.10); Mikhail Dovgalyuk (1:47.37); Valeriya Salamatina (1:56.18); Viktoriya Andreeva (1:58.72); Martin Malyutin^{[c]} Vyacheslav Andrusenko^{[c]} Irina Krivonogova^{[c]} Anastasia Guzhenkova^{[c]}	7:29.37	Great Britain; Stephen Milne (1:47.77); Craig McLean (1:48.34); Kathryn Greenslade (1:57.81); Freya Anderson (1:55.80); Cameron Kurle^{[c]} Holly Hibbott^{[c]}	7:29.72
4 × 100 m mixed medley relay	Great Britain; Georgia Davies (59.12); Adam Peaty (57.27); James Guy (50.96); Freya Anderson (52.83); Nicholas Pyle^{[c]} Charlotte Atkinson^{[c]}	3:40.18 ER, CR	Russia; Kliment Kolesnikov (52.51); Yuliya Yefimova (1:05.07); Svetlana Chimrova (57.30); Vladimir Morozov (47.83); Grigoriy Tarasevich^{[c]} Ilya Khomenko^{[c]} Viktoriya Andreyeva^{[c]} Maria Kameneva^{[c]}	3:42.71	Italy; Margherita Panziera (1:00.11); Fabio Scozzoli (59.46); Elena Di Liddo (57.68); Alessandro Miressi (47.60); Matteo Restivo^{[c]} Arianna Castiglioni^{[c]} Luca Dotto^{[c]}	3:44.85

^{c} Swimmers who participated in the heats only and received medals.

== Diving ==
=== Medal table ===
Rank	Nation	Gold	Silver	Bronze	Total
1	Russia	5	4	3	12
2	Great Britain*	4	5	1	10
3	Germany	1	2	5	8
4	Italy	1	2	1	4
5	Ukraine	1	0	1	2
6	Netherlands	1	0	0	1
7	Armenia	0	0	1	1
7	France	0	0	1	1
Totals (8 entries)		13	13	13	39

=== Men ===
Event	Gold		Silver		Bronze	
1 m springboard	Jack Laugher; Great Britain	414.60	Giovanni Tocci; Italy	401.10	James Heatly; Great Britain	391.70
3 m springboard	Jack Laugher; Great Britain	525.95	Ilia Zakharov; Russia	519.05	Evgeny Kuznetsov; Russia	508.05
3 m springboard synchro	Russia; Evgeny Kuznetsov; Ilia Zakharov	431.16	Great Britain; Jack Laugher; Chris Mears	430.62	Germany; Patrick Hausding; Lars Rüdiger	394.77
10 m platform	Aleksandr Bondar; Russia	542.05	Nikita Shleikher; Russia	481.15	Benjamin Auffret; France	480.60
10 m platform synchro	Russia; Aleksandr Bondar; Viktor Minibaev	423.12	Great Britain; Matthew Dixon; Noah Williams	399.90	Armenia; Vladimir Harutyunyan; Lev Sargsyan	396.84

=== Women ===
Event	Gold		Silver		Bronze	
1 m springboard	Maria Poliakova; Russia	285.55	Nadezhda Bazhina; Russia	276.00	Elena Bertocchi; Italy	271.25
3 m springboard	Grace Reid; Great Britain	329.40	Alicia Blagg; Great Britain	327.70	Tina Punzel; Germany	324.65
3 m springboard synchro	Italy; Elena Bertocchi; Chiara Pellacani	289.26	Germany; Lena Hentschel; Tina Punzel	286.80	Russia; Nadezhda Bazhina; Kristina Ilinykh	282.90
10 m platform	Celine van Duijn; Netherlands	319.10	Noemi Batki; Italy	315.00	Maria Kurjo; Germany	308.15
10 m platform synchro	Great Britain; Eden Cheng; Lois Toulson	289.74	Russia; Ekaterina Beliaeva; Yulia Timoshinina	288.60	Germany; Maria Kurjo; Elena Wassen	284.64

=== Mixed events ===
Event	Gold		Silver		Bronze	
Mixed 3 m springboard synchro	Germany; Tina Punzel; Lou Massenberg	313.50	Great Britain; Grace Reid; Ross Haslam	308.67	Ukraine; Viktoriya Kesar; Stanislav Oliferchyk	291.81
Mixed 10 m platform synchro	Russia; Nikita Shleikher; Yulia Timoshinina	309.63	Great Britain; Matthew Lee; Lois Toulson	307.80	Germany; Florian Fandler; Christina Wassen	278.64
Team event	Ukraine; Oleh Kolodiy; Sofiya Lyskun	355.90	Germany; Lou Massenberg; Maria Kurjo	352.60	Russia; Yulia Timoshinina; Evgeny Kuznetsov	349.55

== Open water swimming ==
=== Medal table ===
Host nation

Rank	Nation	Gold	Silver	Bronze	Total
1	Netherlands	4	1	1	6
2	Hungary	2	1	0	3
3	Italy	1	1	2	4
4	Germany	0	2	1	3
5	France	0	1	3	4
6	Russia	0	1	0	1
Totals (6 entries)		7	7	7	21

=== Men ===
Event	Gold		Silver		Bronze	
5 km	Kristóf Rasovszky; Hungary	52:38.9	Axel Reymond; France	52:41.7	Logan Fontaine; France	52:44.4
10 km	Ferry Weertman; Netherlands	1:49:28.2	Kristóf Rasovszky; Hungary	1:49:28.2	Rob Muffels; Germany	1:49:33.7
25 km	Kristóf Rasovszky; Hungary	4:57.53.5	Kirill Belyaev; Russia	4:57:54.6	Matteo Furlan; Italy	4:57:55.8

=== Women ===
Event	Gold		Silver		Bronze	
5 km	Sharon van Rouwendaal; Netherlands	56:01.0	Leonie Beck; Germany	56:17.8	Rachele Bruni; Italy	56:49.7
10 km	Sharon van Rouwendaal; Netherlands	1:54:45.7	Giulia Gabbrielleschi; Italy	1:54:53.0	Esmee Vermeulen; Netherlands	1:55:27.4
25 km	Arianna Bridi; Italy	5:19:34.6	Sharon van Rouwendaal; Netherlands	5:19:34.7	Lara Grangeon; France	5:19:42.9

=== Mixed events ===
Event	Gold		Silver		Bronze	
Team event	Netherlands; Esmee Vermeulen; Sharon van Rouwendaal; Pepijn Smits; Ferry Weertman	52:35.0	Germany; Leonie Beck; Sarah Köhler; Sören Meißner; Florian Wellbrock	52:35.6	France; Lara Grangeon; David Aubry; Lisa Pou; Marc-Antoine Olivier	52:46.7

== Synchronised swimming ==
=== Medal table ===
Rank	Nation	Gold	Silver	Bronze	Total
1	Russia	8	0	0	8
2	Ukraine	1	5	1	7
3	Italy	0	4	5	9
4	Spain	0	0	3	3
Totals (4 entries)		9	9	9	27

=== Results ===
Event	Gold		Silver		Bronze	
Solo free routine	Russia; Svetlana Kolesnichenko	94.9333	Italy; Linda Cerruti	92.5000	Ukraine; Yelyzaveta Yakhno	92.1333
Solo technical routine	Russia; Svetlana Kolesnichenko	93.4816	Ukraine; Yelyzaveta Yakhno	91.3517	Italy; Linda Cerruti	90.1778
Duet free routine	Russia; Svetlana Kolesnichenko; Varvara Subbotina	96.7000	Ukraine; Anastasiya Savchuk; Yelyzaveta Yakhno	93.4000	Italy; Linda Cerruti; Costanza Ferro	92.1333
Duet technical routine	Russia; Svetlana Kolesnichenko; Varvara Subbotina	95.1035	Ukraine; Anastasiya Savchuk; Yelyzaveta Yakhno	92.6188	Italy; Linda Cerruti; Costanza Ferro	89.7519
Team free routine	Russia; Anastasia Arkhipovskaya; Anastasia Bayandina; Daria Bayandina; Marina Goliadkina; Veronika Kalinina; Polina Komar; Maria Shurochkina; Darina Valitova; Mikhaela Kalancha	97.0333	Ukraine; Valeriia Aprielieva; Veronika Hryshko; Oleksandra Kashuba; Yana Nariezhna; Kateryna Reznik; Anastasiya Savchuk; Alina Shynkarenko; Yelyzaveta Yakhno; Maryna Aleksiiva; Oleksandra Kovalenko	94.6000	Italy; Beatrice Callegari; Linda Cerruti; Francesca Deidda; Costanza Di Camillo; Costanza Ferro; Gemma Galli; Alessia Pezone; Enrica Piccoli; Domiziana Cavanna; Federica Sala	92.2333
Team technical routine	Russia; Anastasia Arkhipovskaya; Anastasia Bayandina; Daria Bayandina; Marina Goliadkina; Mikhaela Kalancha; Veronika Kalinina; Polina Komar; Maria Shurochkina; Darina Valitova	94.6000	Ukraine; Maryna Aleksiiva; Vladyslava Aleksiiva; Oleksandra Kashuba; Oleksandra Kovalenko; Yana Nariezhna; Anastasiya Savchuk; Alina Shynkarenko; Yelyzaveta Yakhno; Valeriia Aprielieva; Veronika Hryshko	90.7439	Italy; Beatrice Callegari; Domiziana Cavanna; Linda Cerruti; Francesca Deidda; Costanza Di Camillo; Costanza Ferro; Gemma Galli; Enrica Piccoli; Alessia Pezone; Federica Sala	90.3553
Combination routine	Ukraine; Maryna Aleksiiva; Vladyslava Aleksiiva; Valeriia Aprielieva; Marta Fiedina; Oleksandra Kashuba; Yana Nariezhna; Kateryna Reznik; Anastasiya Savchuk; Alina Shynkarenko; Yelyzaveta Yakhno; Veronika Hryshko; Oleksandra Kovalenko	94.4667	Italy; Beatrice Callegari; Domiziana Cavanna; Linda Cerruti; Francesca Deidda; Costanza Di Camillo; Costanza Ferro; Gemma Galli; Alessia Pezone; Enrica Piccoli; Federica Sala; Marta Murru; Francesca Zunino	92.6000	Spain; Leyre Abadía; Abril Conesa; Berta Ferreras; Emma García; María Juárez; Meritxell Mas; Elena Melián; Paula Ramírez; Sara Saldaña; Blanca Toledano; Iris Tió	91.4667
Mixed free routine	Russia; Mayya Gurbanberdieva; Aleksandr Maltsev	92.4000	Italy; Manila Flamini; Giorgio Minisini	90.7333	Spain; Berta Ferreras; Pau Ribes	85.4333
Mixed technical routine	Russia; Mayya Gurbanberdieva; Aleksandr Maltsev	89.5853	Italy; Manila Flamini; Giorgio Minisini	88.6973	Spain; Berta Ferreras; Pau Ribes	82.3217

== See also ==
- 2017 World Aquatics Championships
- 2019 World Aquatics Championships
