= Kathryn Greenslade =

British swimmer (born 1998)

Personal information
- National team: Great Britain; Wales
- Born: 18 January 1998 (age 28)

Sport
- Sport: Swimming
- Strokes: Freestyle, Backstroke
Medal record
Women's swimming
Representing Great Britain
European Championships (LC)
Gold medal – first place	2018 Glasgow	4×200 m freestyle
Representing Wales
Commonwealth Games
Bronze medal – third place	2018 Gold Coast	4×100 m medley

Kathryn Greenslade (born 18 January 1998) is a British swimmer. She competed for Great Britain at the 2018 European Aquatics Championships, winning a gold medal in the women's 4 × 200 metre freestyle relay event. Greenslade also competed for Wales at the 2018 Commonwealth Games, winning a bronze medal in 4×100 m medley event.
