= Robin Neumann =

Dutch swimmer (born 1997)

Personal information
- National team: Netherlands
- Born: 12 December 1997 (age 28) Neuilly-sur-Seine, France

Sport
- Sport: Swimming
- Strokes: Freestyle
- Club: De Dolfijn
- College team: University of California, Berkeley
- Coach: Martin Truijens
Medal record
Women's swimming
Representing the Netherlands
World Championships (SC)
Bronze medal – third place	2016 Windsor	4 × 100 m freestyle
European Championships (LC)
Silver medal – second place	2020 Budapest	4 × 100 m freestyle
Bronze medal – third place	2016 London	4 × 200 m freestyle

Robin Neumann (born 12 December 1997) is a Dutch competitive swimmer who specializes in freestyle.

Neumann competed at the 2014 Youth Olympics in Nanjing, China, where she swam individually in the backstroke events. Since then she has changed her focus to freestyle.

At the 2015 European Short Course Championships in Netanya, Israel, she finished 4th in the 200 meter freestyle.

She qualified for the 2016 Summer Olympics in Rio de Janeiro in the 200 meter freestyle and the 4 × 200 meter freestyle relay. In the 200 m freestyle she finished 26th in the heats and did not advance to the semifinals. In the 4 × 200 meter freestyle relay, her team finished 14th in the heats.

== Personal life ==
Neumann has an Austrian father and a Dutch mother. Robin was born in France, and grew up all over Europe, swimming everywhere her family moved to. She currently represents the Netherlands.

== See also ==
- List of Dutch records in swimming
