= Marie Pietruschka =

German swimmer (born 1995)

Personal information
- Nationality: German
- Born: 21 June 1995 (age 31)

Sport
- Sport: Swimming
- Strokes: Freestyle
Medal record
Women's swimming
Representing Germany
European Championships (LC)
Bronze medal – third place	2018 Glasgow	4×200 m freestyle

Marie Pietruschka (born 21 June 1995) is a German swimmer.

She competed in the 4 × 200 m freestyle relay event at the 2018 European Aquatics Championships, winning the bronze medal.
