= Reva Foos =

German swimmer (born 1993)

Personal information
- Nationality: German
- Born: 15 September 1993 (age 32)

Sport
- Sport: Swimming
- Strokes: Freestyle
Medal record
European Championships (LC)
Bronze medal – third place	2018 Glasgow	4×200 m freestyle

Reva Foos (born 15 September 1993) is a German swimmer. She competed in the women's 4 × 200 metre freestyle relay event at the 2018 European Aquatics Championships, winning the bronze medal.
