= Valeriya Salamatina =

Russian swimmer (born 1998)

Personal information
- Nationality: (Russia) Russian
- Born: 19 September 1998 (age 27) Chelyabinsk, Russia

Sport
- Sport: Swimming
- Strokes: Freestyle
Medal record
Women's swimming
Representing Russia
European Championships (LC)
Silver medal – second place	2018 Glasgow	4×200m freestyle
Silver medal – second place	2018 Glasgow	4×200m mixed freestyle

Valeriya Salamatina (born 19 September 1998) is a Russian swimmer.

She competed in the 2018 European Aquatics Championships, winning silver medal in both the 4×200m women's freestyle relay and the 4×200m mixed freestyle relay.

In May 2025 Salamatina was issued with a two-year ban for an anti-doping rule violation after testing positive for furosemide.
