= Annika Bruhn =

German swimmer (born 1992)

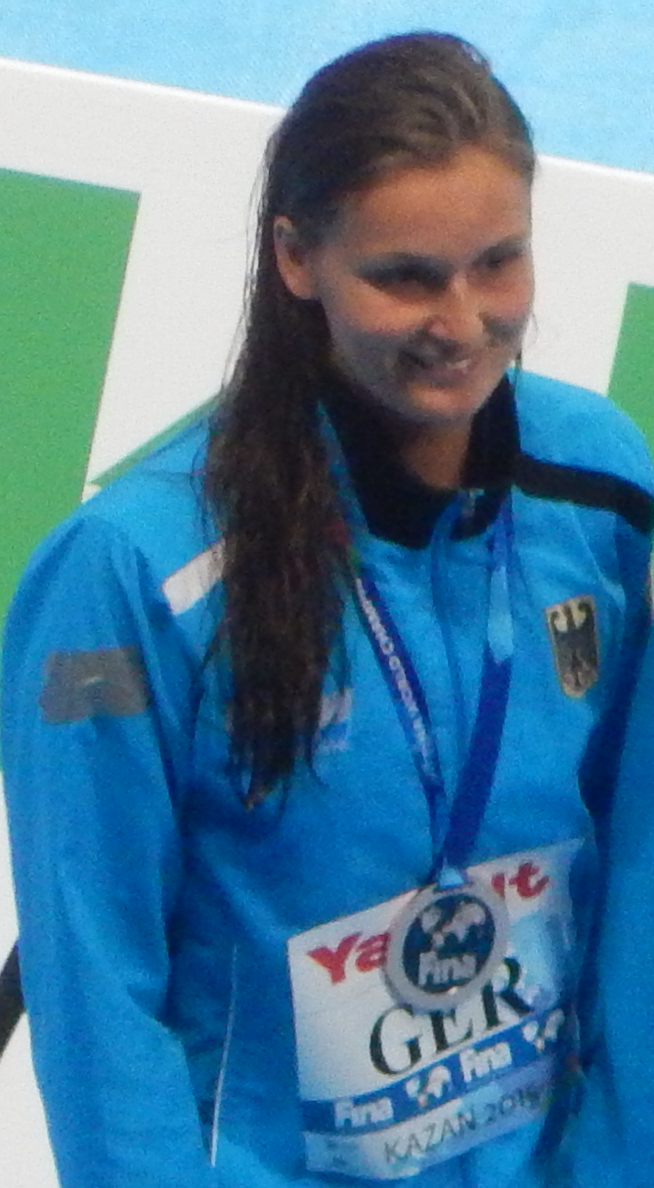
- Bruhn at Kazan 2015

Personal information
- Born: 5 October 1992 (age 33) Karlsruhe, Germany
- Height: 183 cm (6 ft 0 in)
- Weight: 69 kg (152 lb)

Sport
- Sport: Swimming
- Strokes: Freestyle
Medal record
Women's swimming
Representing Germany
World Championships (LC)
Bronze medal – third place	2015 Kazan	4×100 m mixed medley
European Championships (LC)
Gold medal – first place	2018 Glasgow	4×200 m mixed freestyle
Bronze medal – third place	2018 Glasgow	4×200 m freestyle

Annika Bruhn (born 5 October 1992) is a German swimmer. She competed at the 2012 Summer Olympics. At the 2016 Summer Olympics in Rio de Janeiro, she competed in the women's 200 metre freestyle, finishing 20th in the heats and failing to qualify for the semifinals. She was a member of the women's 4 x 200 metre freestyle relay team which finished 12th in the heats and did not qualify for the final. She was also a member of the women's 4 × 100 m medley relay team which finished 12th in the heats and did not qualify for the final.
