= Guatemala at the 2025 World Aquatics Championships =

- Flag of Guatemala
- World Aquatics code: GUA
- National federation: National Federation of Swimming, Diving, Water Polo and Synchronized Swimming of Guatemala
- Website: fenadegua.com.gt (in Spanish)

in Singapore
- Competitors: 7 in 2 sports
- Medals: Gold 0 Silver 0 Bronze 0 Total 0

World Aquatics Championships appearances
- 1973; 1975; 1978; 1982; 1986; 1991; 1994; 1998; 2001; 2003; 2005; 2007; 2009; 2011; 2013; 2015; 2017; 2019; 2022; 2023; 2024; 2025

Guatemala is competing at the 2025 World Aquatics Championships in Singapore from 11 July to 3 August 2025.

== Competitors ==
The following is the list of competitors in the Championships.

Sport	Men	Women	Total
Open water swimming	2	2	4
Swimming	1	2	3
Total	3	4	7

== Open water swimming ==
Men

Athlete	Event	Final	
Athlete	Event	Time	Rank
Jose Barrios	5 km	1:02:41.20	43
Oscar Garcia	5 km	1:07:22.10	65
Jose Barrios	10 km	2:11:41.80	44
Oscar Garcia	10 km	DNF	

Women

Athlete	Event	Final	
Athlete	Event	Time	Rank
Maria Porres	5 km	1:12:27.40	54
Yanci Vanegas	5 km	1:09:55.60	45
Maria Porres	10 km	DNF	
Yanci Vanegas	10 km	2:29:07.20	44

== Swimming ==
Men

Athlete	Event	Heat		Semifinal		Final	
Athlete	Event	Time	Rank	Time	Rank	Time	Rank
Erick Gordillo	200 m butterfly	1:59.23	23	Did not advance			
Erick Gordillo	200 m medley	2:03.10	32	Did not advance			

Women

Athlete	Event	Heat		Semifinal		Final	
Athlete	Event	Time	Rank	Time	Rank	Time	Rank
Emilia Sandoval	100 m freestyle	59.88	50	Did not advance			
Emilia Sandoval	100 m backstroke	1:06.68	47	Did not advance			
Stephanie Iannaccone	200 m breaststroke	2:37.06	32	Did not advance			
Stephanie Iannaccone	200 m medley	2:19.92	32	Did not advance			
