= 2018 FINA World Swimming Championships (25 m) – Women's 400 metre freestyle =

Women's 400 metre freestyle at the 2018 FINA World Swimming Championships (25 m)
- Venue: Hangzhou Sports Park Stadium
- Dates: 14 December (heats and final)
- Competitors: 41 from 34 nations
- Winning time: 3:53.92 WR

Medalists
gold medal	Ariarne Titmus	Australia
silver medal	Wang Jianjiahe	China
bronze medal	Li Bingjie	China

The women's 400 metre freestyle competition of the 2018 FINA World Swimming Championships (25 m) was held on 14 December 2018.

== Records ==
Prior to the competition, the existing world and championship records were as follows.

	Name	Nation	Time	Location	Date
World record	Wang Jianjiahe	China	3:53.97	Budapest	4 October 2018
Championship record	Mireia Belmonte	Spain	3:55.76	Doha	5 December 2014

The following new records were set during this competition:

Date	Event	Name	Nation	Time	Record
14 December	Final	Ariarne Titmus	Australia	3:53.92	WR

== Results ==
=== Heats ===
The heats were started at 10:15.

Rank	Heat	Lane	Name	Nationality	Time	Notes
1	4	3	Ariarne Titmus	Australia	3:58.58	Q
2	4	5	Leah Smith	United States	4:00.46	Q
3	5	4	Wang Jianjiahe	China	4:00.73	Q
4	5	6	Li Bingjie	China	4:01.82	Q
5	5	5	Anna Egorova	Russia	4:02.31	Q
6	5	3	Sarah Köhler	Germany	4:02.79	Q
7	4	6	Erica Musso	Italy	4:03.37	Q
8	4	0	Valeriya Salamatina	Russia	4:04.51	Q
9	5	7	Simona Quadarella	Italy	4:04.94	
10	4	2	Carla Buchanan	Australia	4:05.00	
11	4	1	Diana Durães	Portugal	4:05.65	
12	4	9	Haley Anderson	United States	4:05.89	
13	4	8	Katja Fain	Slovenia	4:06.05	
14	5	2	Chihiro Igarashi	Japan	4:06.21	
15	4	7	Mayuko Goto	Japan	4:06.81	
16	5	1	Marlene Kahler	Austria	4:06.95	
17	5	9	Reva Foos	Germany	4:09.55	
18	3	6	Beril Böcekler	Turkey	4:09.90	NR
19	3	3	Elisbet Gámez Matos	Cuba	4:09.94	
20	3	5	Hanna Eriksson	Sweden	4:10.70	
21	3	8	Rachel Tseng	Singapore	4:11.11	NR
22	5	0	Catalina Corro	Spain	4:11.40	
23	3	4	Hayley McIntosh	New Zealand	4:12.50	
24	5	8	Ho Nam Wai	Hong Kong	4:13.69	
25	3	1	Sabína Kupčová	Slovakia	4:14.78	
26	3	2	Jessica Cattaneo	Peru	4:15.61	
27	1	5	Chen Szu-an	Chinese Taipei	4:16.49	
28	2	5	Kristina Miletić	Croatia	4:17.93	
29	2	4	Rosalee Santa Ana	Philippines	4:18.03	NR
30	3	7	Delfina Dini	Argentina	4:18.20	
31	3	0	Souad Cherouati	Algeria	4:20.12	
32	2	6	Gabriella Doueihy	Lebanon	4:26.56	
33	2	2	Michell Ramirez	Honduras	4:28.23	NR
34	2	0	Nàdia Tudó Cubells	Andorra	4:32.85	
35	2	3	Daila Ismatul	Guatemala	4:34.70	
36	2	7	Matalia Kuipers	United States Virgin Islands	4:35.11	NR
37	1	4	Lorna Doorman	Zimbabwe	4:39.58	
38	2	1	Tinatin Kevlishvili	Georgia	4:40.44	
39	1	3	Tiana Rabarijaona	Madagascar	4:46.08	
40	2	9	Sonja Kapedani	Albania	4:55.92	
41	2	8	Osisang Chilton	Palau	4:56.24	
	3	9	Talita Te Flan	Ivory Coast		DNS
	4	4	Boglárka Kapás	Hungary		DNS

=== Final ===
The final was held at 19:48.

Rank	Lane	Name	Nationality	Time	Notes
1st place, gold medalist(s)	4	Ariarne Titmus	Australia	3:53.92	WR
2nd place, silver medalist(s)	3	Wang Jianjiahe	China	3:54.56	
3rd place, bronze medalist(s)	6	Li Bingjie	China	3:57.99	
4	5	Leah Smith	United States	3:58.58	
5	2	Anna Egorova	Russia	4:01.52	
6	8	Valeriya Salamatina	Russia	4:02.87	
7	7	Sarah Köhler	Germany	4:03.28	
8	1	Erica Musso	Italy	4:03.61	
