= 2018 FINA World Swimming Championships (25 m) – Women's 800 metre freestyle =

Women's 800 metre freestyle at the 2018 FINA World Swimming Championships (25 m)
- Venue: Hangzhou Sports Park Stadium
- Dates: 12 December (heats); 13 December (final)
- Competitors: 29 from 24 nations
- Winning time: 8:04.35

Medalists
gold medal	Wang Jianjiahe	China
silver medal	Simona Quadarella	Italy
bronze medal	Leah Smith	United States

The women's 800 metre freestyle competition of the 2018 FINA World Swimming Championships (25 m) was held on 12 and 13 December 2018.

== Records ==
Before the competition, the existing world and championship records were as follows.

	Name	Nation	Time	Location	Date
World record	Mireia Belmonte	Spain	7:59.34	Berlin	10 August 2013
Championship record	Mireia Belmonte	Spain	8:03.41	Doha	4 December 2014

== Results ==
=== Heats ===
The heats were started on 12 December at 11:25.

Rank	Heat	Lane	Name	Nationality	Time	Notes
1	4	4	Wang Jianjiahe	China	8:07.59	Q
2	3	6	Leah Smith	United States	8:12.28	Q
3	3	4	Sarah Köhler	Germany	8:15.15	Q
4	4	2	Simona Quadarella	Italy	8:16.68	Q
5	3	5	Li Bingjie	China	8:16.75	Q
6	3	3	Anna Egorova	Russia	8:19.45	Q
7	4	1	Hayley Anderson	United States	8:19.52	Q
8	3	2	Mayuko Goto	Japan	8:19.93	Q
9	4	7	Yukimi Moriyama	Japan	8:22.23	
10	3	7	Jimena Pérez	Spain	8:24.65	
11	3	8	Katja Fain	Slovenia	8:25.89	
12	2	5	Tamila Holub	Portugal	8:29.58	
13	4	8	Diana Durães	Portugal	8:30.12	
14	3	1	Marlene Kahler	Austria	8:31.49	
15	4	0	Caitlin Deans	New Zealand	8:35.26	
16	2	4	Beril Böcekler	Turkey	8:36.33	
17	3	0	Ho Nam Wai	Hong Kong	8:39.55	
18	3	9	Hayley McIntosh	New Zealand	8:40.35	
19	4	9	Hanna Eriksson	Sweden	8:43.36	
20	2	2	Souad Cherouati	Algeria	8:44.73	
21	2	6	Delfina Dini	Argentina	8:44.81	
22	2	3	María Bramont-Arias	Peru	8:49.41	
23	2	1	Chen Szu-an	Chinese Taipei	8:54.36	
24	2	7	Laura Benková	Slovakia	8:54.71	
25	2	9	Kristina Miletić	Croatia	8:55.97	
26	2	0	Rosalee Mira Santa Ana	Philippines	9:01.90	NR
27	1	3	Therese Soukup	Seychelles	9:22.68	
28	1	4	Tiana Rabarijaona	Madagascar	9:44.98	
29	1	5	Sonja Kapedani	Albania	10:04.17	
	2	8	Talita Te Flan	Ivory Coast	DNS	
	4	3	Ariarne Titmus	Australia	DNS	
	4	5	Boglárka Kapás	Hungary	DNS	
	4	6	Maddy Gough	Australia	DNS	

=== Final ===
The final was held on 13 December at 20:37.

Rank	Lane	Name	Nationality	Time	Notes
1st place, gold medalist(s)	4	Wang Jianjiahe	China	8:04.35	
2nd place, silver medalist(s)	6	Simona Quadarella	Italy	8:08.03	
3rd place, bronze medalist(s)	5	Leah Smith	United States	8:08.75	
4	2	Li Bingjie	China	8:09.81	
5	3	Sarah Köhler	Germany	8:10.54	NR
6	7	Anna Egorova	Russia	8:12.65	
7	1	Hayley Anderson	United States	8:18.70	
8	8	Mayuko Goto	Japan	8:22.10	
