= List of Malagasy records in swimming =

The Malagasy records in swimming are the fastest ever performances of swimmers from Madagascar, which are recognised and ratified by the Federation Malgache De Natation.

All records were set in finals unless noted otherwise.

== Long Course (50 m) ==
=== Men ===
Event	Time		Name	Club	Date	Meet	Location	Ref
50 m freestyle	23.76	h	Eliot-Tahina Rakotondramanga	Villejuif Natation	20 June 2024	French Championships	Chartres, France	
100 m freestyle	53.20		Eliot-Tahina Rakotondramanga	Villejuif Natation	25 March 2023	IDF 50m Criterion No. 1 - Promotional Webconfrontation	Corbeil-Essonnes, France	
200 m freestyle	1:58.05		Eliot-Tahina Rakotondramanga	Villejuif Natation	20 December 2025	Francily Open National Meeting	Taverny, France	
400 m freestyle	4:18.04		Baritiana Andriampenomanana	Madagascar	7 May 2026	African Championships	Oran, Algeria	
800 m freestyle	9:11.67		Baritiana Andriampenomanana	Madagascar	1 May 2025	African Junior Championships	Cairo, Egypt	
1500 m freestyle	17:28.60		Baritiana Andriampenomanana	Madagascar	9 September 2023	World Junior Championships	Netanya, Israel	
50 m backstroke	26.67		Eliot-Tahina Rakotondramanga	Villejuif Natation	12 March 2023	National Eurocom Meeting in Massy	Massy, France	
100 m backstroke	56.93	r	Eliot-Tahina Rakotondramanga	Villejuif Natation	20 July 2023	French Open Summer Championships	Poitiers, France	
200 m backstroke	2:09.36		Eliot-Tahina Rakotondramanga	ES Massy Natation	14 May 2022	French Open Summer Championships	Poitiers, France	
50m breaststroke	28.30		Jonathan Raharvel	Madagascar	8 May 2026	African Championships	Oran, Algeria	
100m breaststroke	1:02.77	h	Jonathan Raharvel	Madagascar	6 May 2026	African Championships	Oran, Algeria	
200m breaststroke	2:19.63	h	Jonathan Raharvel	Madagascar	7 April 2023	Thailand Age Group Championships	Samutprakarn, Thailand	
50m butterfly	24.14	h	Anthonny Ralefy	Madagascar	9 June 2016	Mare Nostrum	Canet-en-Roussillon, France	
100m butterfly	54.33	b	Eliot-Tahina Rakotondramanga	ES Massy Natation	20 June 2021	French Championships	Chartres, France	
200m butterfly	2:01.72	h	Eliot-Tahina Rakotondramanga	ES Massy Natation	17 June 2021	French Championships	Chartres, France	
200 m individual medley	2:13.01		Eliot-Tahina Rakotondramanga	Villejuif Natation	14 March 2026	Web Confront@tion N°1	Massy, France	
400 m individual medley	5:02.94	h	Baritiana Andriampenomanana	Madagascar	8 September 2023	World Junior Championships	Netanya, Israel	
4×100 m freestyle relay	3:37.68		Baritiana Andriampenomanana (54.18); Tendry Rakotoba (55.54); Mamitiana Raveloson (54.51); Aina Emadisson (53.45)	Madagascar	8 May 2026	African Championships	Oran, Algeria	
4×200 m freestyle relay	8:36.44		Tendry Rakotobe; Andraina Rabenjalinoro; Mamihaja Andriampenomanana; Baritiana Andriampenomanana	Madagascar	29 August 2023	Indian Ocean Island Games	Antananarivo, Madagascar	
4×100 m medley relay	4:01.84		Tendry Rakotobe; Jonathan Raharvel; Sandro Rakotomamonjy; Baritiana Andriampenomanana	Madagascar	28 August 2023	Indian Ocean Island Games	Antananarivo, Madagascar	

Legend: # – Record awaiting ratification by Federation Malgache De Natation; WR – World record; AF – African record; e – equalled existing record;
Records not set in finals: h – heat; sf – semifinal; r – relay 1st leg; rh – relay heat 1st leg; b – B final; † – en route to final mark; so – swim-off; tt – time trial

=== Women ===
Event	Time		Name	Club	Date	Meet	Location	Ref
50 m freestyle	26.81		Holy Rabejaona	Madagascar	9 May 2026	African Championships	Oran, Algeria	
100 m freestyle	59.62	h	Holy Rabejaona	Stipendium Hungaricum	15 April 2026	Hungarian Championships	Sopron, Hungary	
200 m freestyle	2:07.14		Tiana Rabarijaona	Madagascar	23 October 2020	Thailand Open Championships	Samutprakarn, Thailand	
400 m freestyle	4:27.04		Tiana Rabarijaona	Madagascar	24 October 2020	Thailand Open Championships	Samutprakarn, Thailand	
800 m freestyle	9:30.29		Tiana Rabarijaona	Madagascar	8 March 2020	Malaysia Invitational Age Group Championships	Kuala Lumpur, Malaysia	
1500 m freestyle	17:56.52		Tiana Rabarijaona	Madagascar	23 October 2020	Thailand Age Group Championships	Samutprakarn, Thailand	
50 m backstroke	30.60		Holy Rabejaona	Madagascar	7 May 2026	African Championships	Oran, Algeria	
100 m backstroke	1:06.80	h	Idealy Tendrinavalona	Unattached	12 June 2024	Singaporean Championships	Singapore, Singapore	
200 m backstroke	2:26.59		Idealy Tendrinavalona	Madagascar	25 May 2024	Malaysia Open Championships	Kuala Lumpur, Malaysia	
50 m breaststroke	33.91		Oceane Rakotonanahary	Madagascar	8 May 2026	African Championships	Oran, Algeria	
100 m breaststroke	1:15.50		Oceane Rakotonanahary	Madagascar	6 May 2026	African Championships	Oran, Algeria	
200 m breaststroke	2:45.93		Vola Hanta Ratsifa Andrihamanana	Madagascar	23 September 1991	All-Africa Games	Cairo, Egypt	
50 m butterfly	28.91		Holy Rabejaona	Madagascar	27 August 2023	Indian Ocean Island Games	Antananarivo, Madagascar	
100 m butterfly	1:05.43		Tojohanitra Andriamanjatoarimanana	Madagascar	16 August 2007	Indian Ocean Island Games	Antananarivo, Madagascar	
200 m butterfly	2:30.65		Tojohanitra Andriamanjatoarimanana	Madagascar	9 December 2006	Les Jeux de l'ACNOA	Mauritius	
200 m individual medley	2:32.14		Oceane Rakotonanahary	Madagascar	9 May 2026	African Championships	Oran, Algeria	
400 m individual medley	5:37.21		Oceane Rakotonanahary	Madagascar	18 April 2025	Dubai International Aquatic Championships	Dubai, United Arab Emirates	
4×100 m freestyle relay	4:17.59			Madagascar	26 August 2023	Indian Ocean Island Games	Antananarivo, Madagascar	
4×200 m freestyle relay	9:44.41			Madagascar	29 August 2023	Indian Ocean Island Games	Antananarivo, Madagascar	
4×100 m medley relay	4:41.62		Idealy Tendrinavalona; Nomena Jauslin; Holy Antsa Rabejaona; Finaritra Razakatiana	Madagascar	28 August 2023	Indian Ocean Island Games	Antananarivo, Madagascar	

Legend: # – Record awaiting ratification by Federation Malgache De Natation; WR – World record; AF – African record; e – equalled existing record;
Records not set in finals: h – heat; sf – semifinal; r – relay 1st leg; rh – relay heat 1st leg; b – B final; † – en route to final mark; so – swim-off; tt – time trial

=== Mixed relay ===
Event	Time	Name	Club	Date	Meet	Location	Ref
4×100 m freestyle relay	3:56.33		Madagascar	27 August 2023	Indian Ocean Island Games	Antananarivo, Madagascar	
4×100 m medley relay	4:13.78		Madagascar	30 August 2023	Indian Ocean Island Games	Antananarivo, Madagascar	

Legend: # – Record awaiting ratification by Federation Malgache De Natation; WR – World record; AF – African record; e – equalled existing record;
Records not set in finals: h – heat; so – swim-off

== Short Course (25 m) ==
=== Men ===
Event	Time		Name	Club	Date	Meet	Location	Ref
50 m freestyle	23.29	h	Eliot-Tahina Rakotondramanga	Villejuif Natation	12 October 2024	Cergy-Pontoise National Swimming Meeting	Cergy-Pontoise, France	
100 m freestyle	51.13	h	Anthonny Ralefy	-	20 November 2015	French Championships	Angers, France	
200 m freestyle	1:54.23		Eliot-Tahina Rakotondramanga	Villejuif Natation	30 November 2024	Autumn Championships - Futures/Benjamins/Juniors/Seniors	Vitry-sur-Seine, France	
400 m freestyle	4:06.80	h	Baritiana Andriampenomanana	Stipendium Hungaricum	5 November 2026	Hungarian Championships	Kaposvár, Hungary	
800 m freestyle	8:37.41		Baritiana Andriampenomanana	Stipendium Hungaricum	7 November 2026	Hungarian Championships	Kaposvár, Hungary	
1500 m freestyle	16:28.42		Baritiana Andriampenomanana	Stipendium Hungaricum	4 November 2026	Hungarian Championships	Kaposvár, Hungary	
50 m backstroke	24.86	r	Eliot-Tahina Rakotondramanga	UPEC	4 April 2024	French University Championship	Caen, France	
100 m backstroke	54.45		Eliot-Tahina Rakotondramanga	UPEC	3 April 2024	French University Championship	Caen, France	
200 m backstroke	2:02.14		Eliot-Tahina Rakotondramanga	UPEC	16 November 2024	French University Championship	Caen, France	
50 m breaststroke	27.51	h	Harivony Raharvel	Stipendium Hungaricum	7 November 2026	Hungarian Championships	Kaposvár, Hungary	
100 m breaststroke	1:01.03	h	Harivony Raharvel	Stipendium Hungaricum	4 November 2026	Hungarian Championships	Kaposvár, Hungary	
200 m breaststroke	2:16.73	b	Harivony Raharvel	Stipendium Hungaricum	8 November 2024	Hungarian Championships	Kaposvár, Hungary	
50 m butterfly	23.88	h	Anthonny Ralefy	-	22 November 2015	French Championships	Angers, France	
100 m butterfly	53.64	h	Eliot-Tahina Rakotondramanga	Villejuif Natation	29 October 2026	French Championships	Chartres, France	
200 m butterfly	1:59.31	b	Eliot-Tahina Rakotondramanga	ES Massy Natation	13 December 2019	French Championships	Angers, France	
100 m individual medley	57.05	h	Anthonny Ralefy	-	21 November 2015	French Championships	Angers, France	
200 m individual medley	2:08.73		Eliot-Tahina Rakotondramanga	Villejuif Natation	17 October 2026	Paris Autumn Meeting	Paris, France	
400 m individual medley	4:38.79		Eliot-Tahina Rakotondramanga	ES Massy Natation	24 November 2018	Essonne 1/2 Long Distance and 4 Stroke Meeting	Massy, France	
4×50 m freestyle relay	1:46.03		Heriniavo Rasolonjatovo (25.42); Johary Randriamanalina (28.39); Sandro Rakotomanonjy (26.67); Dylan Ramiakatrarivo (25.55)	Saint Michel Natation	29 December 2014	Indian Ocean Meet	Saint-Paul, Réunion	
4×100 m freestyle relay								
4×200 m freestyle relay								
4×50 m medley relay	1:56.06		Heriniavo Rasolonjatovo (29.00); Johary Randriamanalina (33.04); Sandro Rakotomanonjy (28.15); Dylan Ramiakatrarivo (25.87)	Saint Michel Natation	30 December 2014	Indian Ocean Meet	Saint-Paul, Réunion	
4×100 m medley relay								

Legend: # – Record awaiting ratification by Federation Malgache De Natation; WR – World record; AF – African record; e – equalled existing record;
Records not set in finals: h – heat; sf – semifinal; r – relay 1st leg; rh – relay heat 1st leg; b – B final; † – en route to final mark; so – swim-off; tt – time trial

=== Women ===
Event	Time		Name	Club	Date	Meet	Location	Ref
50 m freestyle	25.91		Holy Rabejaona	Stipendium Hungaricum	5 November 2026	Hungarian Championships	Kaposvár, Hungary	
100 m freestyle	57.15	h	Holy Rabejaona	Stipendium Hungaricum	4 November 2026	Hungarian Championships	Kaposvár, Hungary	
200 m freestyle	2:17.31	h	Tiana Rabarijaona	Madagascar	6 December 2016	World Championships	Windsor, Canada	
400 m freestyle	4:46.08	h	Tiana Rabarijaona	Madagascar	14 December 2018	World Championships	Hangzhou, China	
800 m freestyle	9:44.98	h	Tiana Rabarijaona	Madagascar	12 December 2018	World Championships	Hangzhou, China	
1500 m freestyle								
50 m backstroke	28.97		Holy Rabejaona	Stipendium Hungaricum	4 November 2026	Hungarian Championships	Kaposvár, Hungary	
100 m backstroke	1:05.59	h	Idealy Tendrinavalona	Madagascar	10 December 2024	World Championships	Budapest, Hungary	
200 m backstroke	2:25.47	h	Idealy Tendrinavalona	Madagascar	21 December 2023	Thailand Age Group Championships	Samutprakarn, Thailand	
50 m breaststroke								
100 m breaststroke	1:21.78	h	Domoinanavalona Amboaratiana	Madagascar	14 December 2012	World Championships	Istanbul, Turkey	
200 m breaststroke								
50 m butterfly	27.82	h	Holy Rabejaona	Stipendium Hungaricum	6 November 2026	Hungarian Championships	Kaposvár, Hungary	
100 m butterfly	1:05.91	h	Antsa Rabejaona	Madagascar	30 October 2021	World Cup	Kazan, Russia	
200 m butterfly								
100 m individual medley	1:06.14	h	Holy Rabejaona	Stipendium Hungaricum	7 November 2026	Hungarian Championships	Kaposvár, Hungary	
200 m individual medley	2:40.30		Johanna Rabary	Saint Michel	30 December 2015	Indian Ocean Meet	Saint-Paul, Réunion	
400 m individual medley								
4×50 m freestyle relay								
4×100 m freestyle relay								
4×200 m freestyle relay								
4×50 m medley relay								
4×100 m medley relay								

Legend: # – Record awaiting ratification by Federation Malgache De Natation; WR – World record; AF – African record; e – equalled existing record;
Records not set in finals: h – heat; sf – semifinal; r – relay 1st leg; rh – relay heat 1st leg; b – B final; † – en route to final mark; so – swim-off; tt – time trial

=== Mixed relay ===
Event	Time		Name	Club	Date	Meet	Location	Ref
4×50 m freestyle relay	1:44.34	h	Baritiana Andriampenomanana (26.23); Jonathan Raharvel (24.66); Idealy Tendrinavalona (27.39); Antsa Rabejaona (26.06)	Madagascar	13 December 2024	World Championships	Budapest, Hungary	
4×50 m medley relay	1:52.68	h	Idealy Tendrinavalona (30.28); Jonathan Raharvel (28.01); Baritiana Andriampenomanana (28.16); Antsa Rabejaona (26.23)	Madagascar	11 December 2024	World Championships	Budapest, Hungary	
4×100 m medley relay	4:07.69	h	Idealy Tendrinavalona (1:05.05); Jonathan Raharvel (1:02.27); Baritiana Andriampenomanana (1:01.37); Antsa Rabejaona (59.00)	Madagascar	14 December 2024	World Championships	Budapest, Hungary	

Legend: # – Record awaiting ratification by Federation Malgache De Natation; e – equalled existing record;
Records not set in finals: h – heat; so – swim-off
