= Swimming at the 2024 Summer Olympics – Women's 1500-metre freestyle =

Women's 1500-metre freestyle at the Games of the XXXIII Olympiad
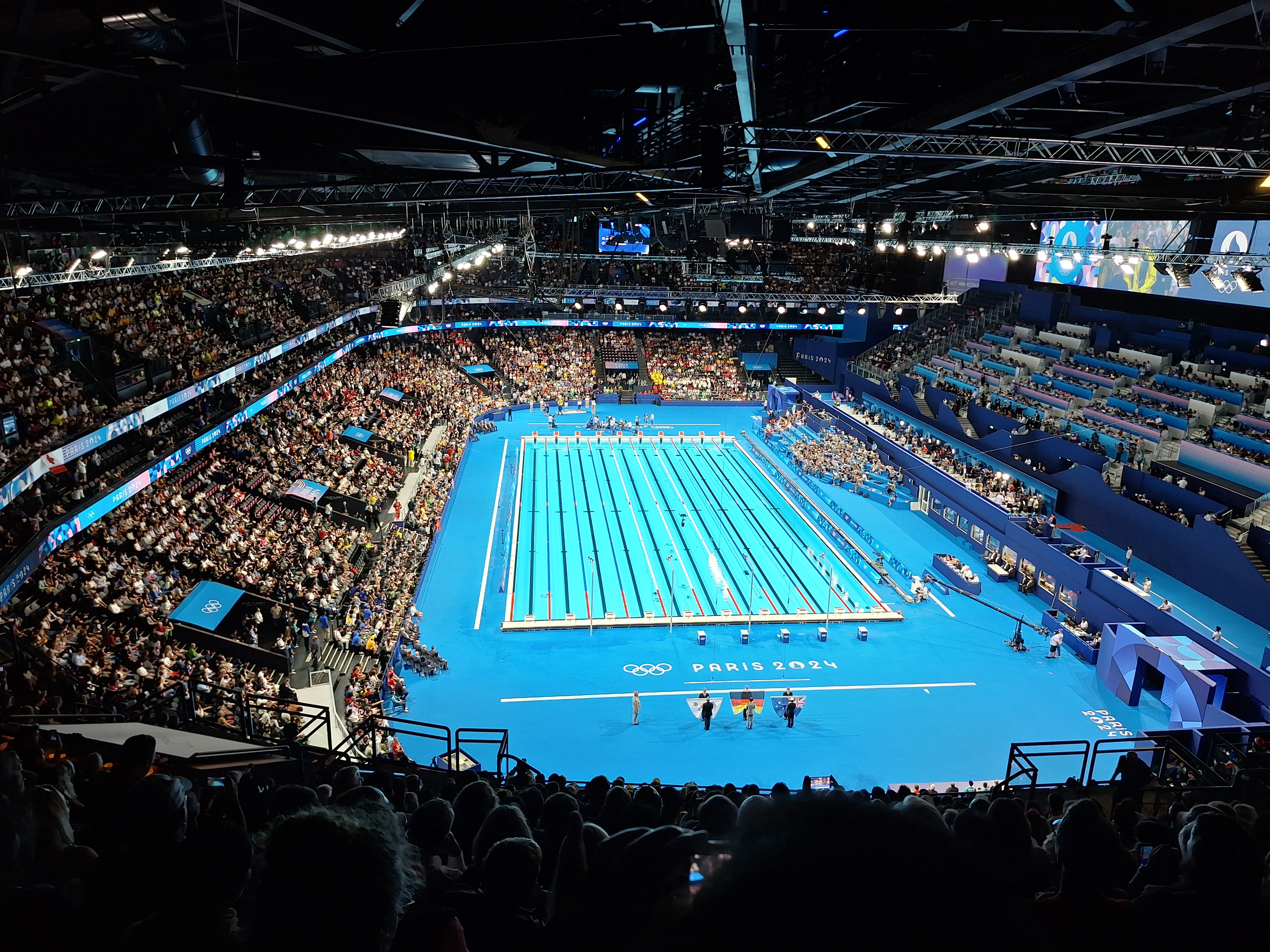
- Paris La Défense Arena after it was converted to a swimming pool for the swimming events
- Venue: Paris La Défense Arena
- Dates: 30 July 2024 (heats); 31 July 2024 (final)
- Competitors: 17 from 12 nations
- Winning time: 15:30.02 OR

Medalists
1st place, gold medalist(s)		Katie Ledecky	United States
2nd place, silver medalist(s)		Anastasiya Kirpichnikova	France
3rd place, bronze medalist(s)		Isabel Gose	Germany

The women's 1500-metre freestyle event at the 2024 Summer Olympics was held on 30 and 31 July 2024 at Paris La Défense Arena, which was converted to a swimming pool for the swimming events.

Defending Olympic champion Katie Ledecky of the US was the favourite to win the event, while Italy's Simona Quadrella, Li Bingjie of China, Anastasiya Kirpichnikova of France, Australian Lani Pallister and the US' Katie Grimes were also considered medal contenders. Pallister withdrew from the event in the heats due to testing positive for COVID-19, and Grimes did not qualify for the finals.

In the final, Ledecky led from beginning to end to win the gold medal with a new Olympic record of 15:30.02. Her win made her the first female swimmer to win gold at four Olympics, and gave her the top twenty fastest times ever in the event. Kirpichnikova finished second with 15:40.35 and Germany's Isabel Gose finished third with 15:53.27.

== Background ==
The US' Katie Ledecky won the event at the previous Olympics in Tokyo, and held the 19 fastest times ever recorded in the event, which were topped by her 15:20.48 world record set in 2018. She won the event at the 2022 and 2023 World Championships and held the fastest Olympic qualifying time of 15:26.27 set at the 2023 World Championships. Italy's Simona Quadrella held the second fastest qualifying time of 15:43.31, and won the event at the 2019 and 2024 World Championships in Ledecky's absence.

Other contenders included Li Bingjie of China, the 2023 World Championships bronze medallist and third fastest qualifier; Anastasiya Kirpichnikova of France, the fourth fastest qualifier; Australian Lani Pallister, the 2022 World Championships bronze medallist; and the US' Katie Grimes, the 2022 World Championships silver medallist.

Both SwimSwam and Swimming World predicted Ledecky would win gold and Quadarella would win silver.

The event was held at Paris La Défense Arena, which was converted to a swimming pool for the swimming events.

== Qualification ==
Each National Olympic Committee (NOC) was permitted to enter a maximum of two qualified athletes in each individual event, but only if both of them had attained the Olympic Qualifying Time (OQT). For this event, the OQT was 16:09.09. World Aquatics then considered athletes qualifying through universality; NOCs were given one event entry for each gender, which could be used by any athlete regardless of qualification time, providing the spaces had not already been taken by athletes from that nation who had achieved the OQT. Finally, the rest of the spaces were filled by athletes who had met the Olympic Consideration Time (OCT), which was 16:13.94 for this event. In total, 14 athletes qualified through achieving the OQT, one athlete qualified through a universality place and two athletes qualified through achieving the OCT.

Top 10 fastest qualification times
Swimmer	Country	Time	Competition
Katie Ledecky	United States	15:26.27	2023 World Aquatics Championships
Simona Quadarella	Italy	15:43.31	2023 World Aquatics Championships
Li Bingjie	China	15:45.71	2023 World Aquatics Championships
Anastasiya Kirpichnikova	France	15:48.53	2023 World Aquatics Championships
Lani Pallister	Australia	15:49.17	2023 World Aquatics Championships
Isabel Gose	Germany	15:52.02	2024 German Championships
Katie Grimes	United States	15:56.27	2023 Pro Swim Series Fort Lauderdale
Moesha Johnson	Australia	15:57.85	2024 Australian Olympic Trials
Beatriz Dizotti	Brazil	16:01.95	2023 World Aquatics Championships
Gao Weizhong	China	16:05.73	2022 Asian Games

== Heats ==
Three heats (preliminary rounds) took place on 30 July 2024, starting at 11:51. (Note: All times are Central European Summer Time (UTC+2)) The swimmers with the best eight times in the heats advanced to the final. Ledecky qualified with the fastest time of 15:47.43, and Quadarella qualified with the second fastest time of 15:51.19. Pallister withdrew from the event after testing positive for COVID-19, and Grimes did not swim fast enough to qualify for the final. Singapore's Gan Ching Hwee set a new national record of 16:10.13 but did not qualify.

Results
Rank	Heat	Lane	Athlete	Nation	Time	Notes
1	3	4	Katie Ledecky	United States	15:47.43	Q
2	2	2	Simona Quadarella	Italy	15:51.19	Q
3	2	5	Anastasiya Kirpichnikova	France	15:52.46	Q
4	2	3	Isabel Gose	Germany	15:53.27	Q
5	2	6	Moesha Johnson	Australia	16:04.02	Q
6	3	5	Li Bingjie	China	16:05.26	Q
7	3	2	Beatriz Dizotti	Brazil	16:05.40	Q
8	3	1	Leonie Märtens	Germany	16:08.69	Q
9	1	5	Gan Ching Hwee	Singapore	16:10.13	NR
10	3	6	Katie Grimes	United States	16:12.11	
11	2	1	Ginevra Taddeucci	Italy	16:12.45	
12	2	7	Eve Thomas	New Zealand	16:13.74	
13	2	2	Gao Weizhong	China	16:27.11	
14	1	4	Kristel Köbrich	Chile	16:27.18	
15	3	7	Vivien Jackl	Hungary	16:31.25	
16	1	3	Sasha Gatt	Malta	17:00.54	
	3	3	Lani Pallister	Australia	DNS	

== Final ==
The final took place at 21:13 on 31 July. Ledecky led from beginning to end to win the gold medal with a new Olympic record of 15:30.02. This was the eighth fastest swim of all time in the event, meaning Ledecky had swum the top 20 performances ever in the event's history.

Kirpichnikova, Germany's Isabel Gose and Quadarella were close to each other for most the race. Kirpichnikova touched first to win the silver medal with a new French record of 15:40.35, while Gose finished with a new German record of 15:41.16 for the bronze. Quadarella finished fourth with 15:44.05. It was Kirpichnikova and Gose's first Olympic medals.

Ledecky's gold brought her to a total of 8 Olympic golds and 12 Olympic medals in her career. She was tied for the American female Olympic swimmer with the best set of medals. Her win also made her the first female swimmer to win gold at four Olympics.

Results
Rank	Lane	Name	Nation	Time	Notes
1st place, gold medalist(s)	4	Katie Ledecky	United States	15:30.02	OR
2nd place, silver medalist(s)	3	Anastasiya Kirpichnikova	France	15:40.35	NR
3rd place, bronze medalist(s)	6	Isabel Gose	Germany	15:41.16	NR
4	5	Simona Quadarella	Italy	15:44.05	
5	7	Li Bingjie	China	16:01.03	
6	2	Moesha Johnson	Australia	16:02.70	
7	1	Beatriz Dizotti	Brazil	16:02.86	
8	8	Leonie Märtens	Germany	16:12.57	

Statistics
Name	500 metre split	1000 metre split	1300 metre split	Time	Stroke rate (strokes/min)
Katie Ledecky	5:06.71	10:19.69	13:27.40	15:30.02	44.9
Anastasiya Kirpichnikova	5:10.57	10:25.81	13:35.87	15:40.35	47.6
Isabel Gose	5:11.97	10:27.73	13:38.04	15:41.16	44.8
Simona Quadarella	5:11.75	10:27.63	18:37.84	15:44.05	48.6
