= 2016 FINA World Swimming Championships (25 m) – Women's 200 metre freestyle =

Women's 200 metre freestyle at the 2016 FINA World Swimming Championships (25 m)
- Venue: WFCU Centre
- Dates: 6 December (heats and final)
- Competitors: 84 from 64 nations
- Winning time: 1:51.73

Medalists
gold medal	Federica Pellegrini	Italy
silver medal	Katinka Hosszú	Hungary
bronze medal	Taylor Ruck	Canada

The Women's 200 metre freestyle competition of the 2016 FINA World Swimming Championships (25 m) was held on 6 December 2016.

== Records ==
Prior to the competition, the existing world and championship records were as follows.

	Name	Nation	Time	Location	Date
World record Championship record	Sarah Sjöström	Sweden	1:50.78	Doha	7 December 2014

== Results ==
=== Heats ===
The heats were held at 10:16.

Rank	Heat	Lane	Name	Nationality	Time	Notes
1	8	4	Katinka Hosszú	Hungary	1:53.07	Q
2	9	7	Mallory Comerford	United States	1:53.71	Q
3	9	4	Federica Pellegrini	Italy	1:54.10	Q
4	8	8	Taylor Ruck	Canada	1:54.26	Q
5	7	4	Veronika Popova	Russia	1:54.32	Q
6	8	3	Katerine Savard	Canada	1:54.81	Q
7	7	3	Leah Smith	United States	1:54.93	Q
8	8	5	Manuella Lyrio	Brazil	1:55.19	Q
9	9	5	Zsuzsanna Jakabos	Hungary	1:55.76	
10	9	8	Chihiro Igarashi	Japan	1:55.92	
11	7	6	Shen Duo	China	1:56.06	
12	9	2	Tomomi Aoki	Japan	1:56.08	
13	8	6	Larissa Oliveira	Brazil	1:56.15	
14	9	3	Ai Yanhan	China	1:56.33	
15	8	7	Reva Foos	Germany	1:56.41	
16	9	1	Signe Bro	Denmark	1:56.52	
17	8	2	Marrit Steenbergen	Netherlands	1:56.59	
18	9	0	Maria Ugolkova	Switzerland	1:56.65	
19	7	5	Carla Buchanan	Australia	1:56.73	
20	9	6	Daria Mullakaeva	Russia	1:56.96	
21	7	1	Jemma Schlicht	Australia	1:57.18	
22	8	1	Sharon van Rouwendaal	Netherlands	1:57.47	
23	7	8	Sze Hang Yu	Hong Kong	1:57.59	
24	1	6	Georgia Coates	Great Britain	1:57.68	
25	8	9	Martina Elhenická	Czech Republic	1:58.30	
26	7	2	Barbora Seemanová	Czech Republic	1:58.62	
27	6	6	Delfina Pignatiello	Argentina	2:00.20	
28	6	1	Helena Moreno	Costa Rica	2:00.79	
29	8	0	Gaja Natlacen	Slovenia	2:00.98	
30	6	3	Elisbet Gámez	Cuba	2:01.08	NR
31	6	4	Anastasia Bogdanovski	Macedonia	2:01.27	
32	7	0	Natthanan Junkrajang	Thailand	2:01.28	
33	6	2	Julia Hassler	Liechtenstein	2:01.48	
34	7	9	Monique Olivier	Luxembourg	2:01.56	
35	5	8	Karen Torrez	Bolivia	2:01.89	
36	6	8	Jasmine Alkhaldi	Philippines	2:01.95	
37	9	9	Diana Durães	Portugal	2:01.97	
38	6	7	Jessica Cattaneo	Peru	2:02.04	
39	5	7	Nejla Karić	Bosnia and Herzegovina	2:02.54	
40	2	0	Felicity Passon	Seychelles	2:02.89	
41	7	7	Isabel Gose	Germany	2:03.12	
42	6	9	Andrea Cedrón	Peru	2:03.30	
43	5	1	Lauren Hew	Cayman Islands	2:03.46	
44	5	0	Allyson Ponson	Aruba	2:03.67	
45	6	5	Benjaporn Sriphanomthorn	Thailand	2:04.10	
46	4	2	Sara Pastrana	Honduras	2:04.91	
47	4	3	Kelsie Campbell	Jamaica	2:04.93	
48	5	3	Marina Chan	Singapore	2:05.18	
49	5	5	Ines Marin	Chile	2:05.22	
50	5	4	Nicole Rautemberg	Paraguay	2:05.40	
51	5	9	Kimiko Raheem	Sri Lanka	2:05.97	
52	4	5	Gabriella Doueihy	Lebanon	2:06.90	
53	4	7	Fatima Alkaramova	Azerbaijan	2:07.07	
54	4	1	Rosalee Mira Santa Ana	Philippines	2:07.20	
55	4	6	Malavika Vishwanath	India	2:07.22	
56	6	0	Sara Nysted	Faroe Islands	2:07.41	
57	5	6	Sarah Hadj-Abderrahmane	Algeria	2:08.33	
58	4	4	Lani Cabrera	Barbados	2:08.44	
59	5	2	Arianna Sanna	Dominican Republic	2:08.50	
60	3	4	Ireyra Tamayo Periñan	Panama	2:08.81	
61	4	8	Rahaf Baqleh	Jordan	2:10.53	
62	3	7	Fernanda Archila	Guatemala	2:10.62	
63	3	2	Ani Poghosyan	Armenia	2:10.64	
64	3	6	Jeanne Boutbien	Senegal	2:10.97	
65	2	2	Stefania Piccardo	Paraguay	2:11.99	
66	2	7	Sonia Tumiotto	Tanzania	2:12.20	
67	3	5	McKayla Treasure	Barbados	2:12.32	
68	3	0	Alison Jackson	Cayman Islands	2:12.57	
69	3	8	Yara Lima	Angola	2:12.86	
70	2	3	Enkhkhuslen Batbayar	Mongolia	2:12.98	
71	2	5	Long Chi Wai	Macau	2:13.37	
72	3	3	Catharine Cooper Gomez	Panama	2:13.89	
73	3	9	Choi Weng Tong	Macau	2:15.52	
74	2	1	Gabriela Hernandez	Nicaragua	2:16.55	
75	2	6	Tiana Rabarijaona	Madagascar	2:17.31	
76	2	8	Diana Basho	Albania	2:17.40	
77	2	4	Annah Auckburaullee	Mauritius	2:17.75	
78	3	1	Sophia Shah	Nepal	2:19.69	
79	1	5	Osisang Chilton	Palau	2:20.57	
80	2	9	Alesia Neziri	Albania	2:24.83	
81	1	7	Charissa Panuve	Tonga	2:26.98	
82	1	4	Aminath Shajan	Maldives	2:30.51	
83	1	3	Angel de Jesus	Northern Mariana Islands	2:31.59	
84	1	2	Ruthie Long	Marshall Islands	2:34.03	
	4	0	Dara Al-Bakry	Jordan		DNS
	4	9	Naomy Grand'Pierre	Haiti		DNS

=== Final ===
The final was held at 18:39.

Rank	Lane	Name	Nationality	Time	Notes
1st place, gold medalist(s)	3	Federica Pellegrini	Italy	1:51.73	
2nd place, silver medalist(s)	4	Katinka Hosszú	Hungary	1:52.28	
3rd place, bronze medalist(s)	6	Taylor Ruck	Canada	1:52.50	WJR, NR
4	2	Veronika Popova	Russia	1:53.39	
5	5	Mallory Comerford	United States	1:53.79	
6	7	Katerine Savard	Canada	1:54.21	
7	1	Leah Smith	United States	1:54.49	
8	8	Manuella Lyrio	Brazil	1:55.51	
