= Swimming at the 2020 European Aquatics Championships – Women's 800 metre freestyle =

Swimming competition

Women's 800 metre freestyle at the 2020 European Aquatics Championships
- Venue: Danube Arena
- Dates: 17 May 2021 (heats); 18 May 2021 (final)
- Competitors: 28 from 16 nations
- Winning time: 8:20.23

Medalists
gold medal	Simona Quadarella	Italy
silver medal	Anastasiya Kirpichnikova	Russia
bronze medal	Anna Egorova	Russia

The Women's 800 metre freestyle competition of the 2020 European Aquatics Championships was held on 17 and 18 May 2021.

== Records ==
Before the competition, the existing world, European and championship records were as follows.

	Name	Nation	Time	Location	Date
World record	Katie Ledecky	United States	8:04.79	Rio de Janeiro	12 August 2016
European record	Rebecca Adlington	Great Britain	8:14.10	Beijing	16 August 2008
Championship record	Jazmin Carlin	Great Britain	8:15.54	Berlin	21 August 2014

== Results ==
=== Heats ===
The heats were started on 17 May at 12:07.

Rank	Heat	Lane	Name	Nationality	Time	Notes
1	3	4	Simona Quadarella	Italy	8:26.73	Q
2	3	5	Martina Caramignoli	Italy	8:31.83	Q
3	3	6	Jimena Pérez	Spain	8:33.34	Q
4	2	4	Anastasiya Kirpichnikova	Russia	8:33.50	Q
5	2	3	Julia Hassler	Liechtenstein	8:34.18	Q
6	2	5	Ajna Késely	Hungary	8:35.71	Q
7	3	3	Anna Egorova	Russia	8:35.88	Q
8	2	7	María de Valdés	Spain	8:36.92	Q
9	2	6	Marlene Kahler	Austria	8:37.11	
10	3	7	Tamila Holub	Portugal	8:41.91	
11	2	2	Diana Durães	Portugal	8:44.81	
12	3	9	Imani de Jong	Netherlands	8:48.02	
13	3	2	Beril Böcekler	Turkey	8:49.57	
14	2	1	Bettina Fábián	Hungary	8:51.41	
15	3	1	Daša Tušek	Slovenia	8:53.44	
16	2	0	Matea Sumajstorčić	Croatia	8:55.63	
17	1	5	Arianna Valloni	San Marino	8:56.15	
18	2	9	Klara Bošnjak	Croatia	8:57.70	
19	1	4	Klaudia Tarasiewicz	Poland	8:57.71	
20	3	0	Kincső Gal	Hungary	9:00.02	
21	1	6	Johanna Enkner	Austria	9:01.07	
22	2	8	Malene Rypestøl	Norway	9:02.08	
23	1	3	Ece Tanrıverdi	Turkey	9:04.92	
24	3	8	Luca Vas	Hungary	9:05.39	
25	1	2	Nika Špehar	Croatia	9:07.23	
26	1	7	Iva Hrsto	Croatia	9:10.88	
27	1	1	Fatima Alkaramova	Azerbaijan	9:14.91	
28	1	8	Katie Rock	Albania	9:54.60	

=== Final ===
The final was held on 18 May at 18:00.

Rank	Lane	Name	Nationality	Time	Notes
1st place, gold medalist(s)	4	Simona Quadarella	Italy	8:20.23	
2nd place, silver medalist(s)	6	Anastasiya Kirpichnikova	Russia	8:21.86	NR
3rd place, bronze medalist(s)	1	Anna Egorova	Russia	8:26.56	
4	7	Ajna Késely	Hungary	8:27.31	
5	5	Martina Caramignoli	Italy	8:29.81	
6	2	Julia Hassler	Liechtenstein	8:32.17	
7	3	Jimena Pérez	Spain	8:33.14	
8	8	María de Valdés	Spain	8:33.90	
