= 2024 World Aquatics Swimming Championships (25 m) – Women's 1500 metre freestyle =

Swimming competition

Women's 1500 metre freestyle at the 2024 World Aquatics Swimming Championships (25 m)
- Venue: Duna Arena
- Location: Budapest, Hungary
- Dates: 13 December
- Competitors: 24 from 19 nations
- Winning time: 15:24.69

Medalists
gold medal	Isabel Gose	Germany
silver medal	Simona Quadarella	Italy
bronze medal	Jillian Cox	United States

The women's 1500 metre freestyle event at the 2024 World Aquatics Swimming Championships (25 m) was held on 15 December 2024 at the Duna Arena in Budapest, Hungary.

== Records ==
Prior to the competition, the existing world and championship records were as follows.

World record	Katie Ledecky (USA)	15:08.24	Toronto, Canada	29 October 2022
Competition record	Lani Pallister (AUS)	15:21.43	Melbourne, Australia	16 December 2022

== Results ==
The slowest heats were started at 10:57, and the fastest heat at 19:07.

Rank	Heat	Lane	Name	Nationality	Time	Notes
1st place, gold medalist(s)	3	3	Isabel Gose	Germany	15:24.69	
2nd place, silver medalist(s)	3	5	Simona Quadarella	Italy	15:30.14	
3rd place, bronze medalist(s)	2	7	Jillian Cox	United States	15:41.29	
4	3	4	Anastasiia Kirpichnikova	France	15:43.33	
5	3	1	Tiana Kritzinger	Australia	15:44.44	
6	2	5	Moesha Johnson	Australia	15:45.07	
7	3	2	Amelie Blocksidge	Great Britain	15:47.28	
8	3	8	Beatriz Dizotti	Brazil	15:49.09	
9	2	0	Gan Ching Hwee	Singapore	15:50.37	NR
10	3	7	Ajna Késely	Hungary	15:52.96	
11	2	8	Kate Hurst	United States	15:55.11	
12	3	6	Kseniia Misharina	Neutral Athletes B	15:55.80	
13	2	1	Eve Thomas	New Zealand	15:56.27	
14	2	6	Leticia Fassina Romão	Brazil	15:59.08	
15	1	6	Artemis Vasilaki	Greece	16:01.96	NR
16	2	2	Viktória Mihályvári-Farkas	Hungary	16:03.59	
17	1	5	Emma Finlin	Canada	16:03.98	
18	2	3	Wu Ruoxin	China	16:07.99	
19	1	2	Stephanie Houtman	South Africa	16:09.12	AF
20	1	4	Chen Yijing	China	16:14.87	
21	1	1	Sasha Gatt	Malta	16:32.58	NR
22	1	3	Ada Hakkarainen	Finland	16:33.85	
23	2	9	Delfina Dini	Argentina	16:35.19	
24	1	7	Kim Chae-yun	South Korea	16:43.48	
	2	4	Deniz Ertan	Turkey	Did not start	
