= Swimming at the 2020 European Aquatics Championships – Women's 400 metre freestyle =

Women's 400 metre freestyle at the 2020 European Aquatics Championships
- Venue: Danube Arena
- Dates: 23 May 2021
- Competitors: 43 from 23 nations
- Winning time: 4:04.66

Medalists
gold medal	Simona Quadarella	Italy
silver medal	Anna Egorova	Russia
bronze medal	Boglárka Kapás	Hungary

The Women's 400 metre freestyle competition of the 2020 European Aquatics Championships was held on 23 May 2021.

== Records ==
Prior to the competition, the existing world, European and championship records were as follows.

	Name	Nation	Time	Location	Date
World record	Katie Ledecky	United States	3:56.46	Rio de Janeiro	7 August 2016
European record	Federica Pellegrini	Italy	3:59.15	Rome	26 July 2009
Championship record	Federica Pellegrini	Italy	4:01.53	Eindhoven	24 March 2008

== Results ==
=== Heats ===
The heats were started at 10:24.

Rank	Heat	Lane	Name	Nationality	Time	Notes
1	4	4	Anna Egorova	Russia	4:08.87	Q
2	5	5	Boglárka Kapás	Hungary	4:09.02	Q
3	4	5	Simona Quadarella	Italy	4:09.04	Q
4	5	4	Ajna Késely	Hungary	4:09.14	Q
5	5	6	Merve Tuncel	Turkey	4:09.37	Q
6	4	3	Beril Böcekler	Turkey	4:09.53	Q
7	4	6	Holly Hibbott	Great Britain	4:10.11	Q
8	5	1	Julia Hassler	Liechtenstein	4:10.74	Q
9	3	5	Helena Rosendahl Bach	Denmark	4:11.79	
10	3	7	Aimee Willmott	Great Britain	4:12.76	
11	4	1	Bettina Fábián	Hungary	4:13.83	
12	3	3	Lotte Goris	Belgium	4:14.06	
13	4	8	Monique Olivier	Luxembourg	4:14.23	
14	5	3	Anastasia Kirpichnikova	Russia	4:14.55	
15	3	4	Robin Neumann	Netherlands	4:14.70	
16	2	4	Imani de Jong	Netherlands	4:15.20	
17	4	0	Deniz Ertan	Turkey	4:15.45	
18	5	9	Sara Gailli	Italy	4:15.52	
19	3	9	Marina Heller Hansen	Denmark	4:15.60	
20	3	6	Jimena Pérez	Spain	4:15.65	
21	5	2	Reva Foos	Germany	4:15.67	
22	5	7	Valentine Dumont	Belgium	4:15.75	
23	4	9	Fanni Fábián	Hungary	4:15.94	
24	4	2	Martina Caramignoli	Italy	4:16.49	
25	3	0	Aleksandra Polańska	Poland	4:16.85	
26	2	6	Tamryn van Selm	Great Britain	4:17.11	
27	3	8	Silke Holkenborg	Netherlands	4:17.67	
28	5	8	Katja Fain	Slovenia	4:18.41	
29	2	2	Claudia Hufnagl	Austria	4:18.61	
30	1	5	Laura Benková	Slovakia	4:21.05	
31	2	9	Matea Sumajstorčić	Croatia	4:22.95	
32	2	1	Daša Tušek	Slovenia	4:23.44	
33	2	0	Snæfríður Jórunnardóttir	Iceland	4:23.45	
34	1	3	Sasha Gatt	Malta	4:24.89	
35	2	5	Klaudia Tarasiewicz	Poland	4:25.33	
36	1	6	Fatima Alkaramova	Azerbaijan	4:25.44	
37	3	1	Aleksandra Knop	Poland	4:26.71	
38	1	2	Nika Špehar	Croatia	4:28.77	
39	2	8	Arina Baikova	Latvia	4:28.98	
40	1	4	Martina Cibulková	Slovakia	4:32.94	
41	1	7	Eda Zeqiri	Kosovo	4:40.13	
42	1	8	Katie Rock	Albania	4:40.79	
43	1	1	Era Budima	Kosovo	4:53.37	
	3	2	María de Valdés	Spain	Did not start	
	5	0	Diana Durães	Portugal	Did not start	
	4	7	Marlene Kahler	Austria	Did not start	
	2	7	Laura Lahtinen	Finland	Did not start	
	2	3	Malene Rypestøl	Norway	Did not start	

=== Final ===
The final was held at 19:05.

Rank	Lane	Name	Nationality	Time	Notes
1st place, gold medalist(s)	3	Simona Quadarella	Italy	4:04.66	
2nd place, silver medalist(s)	4	Anna Egorova	Russia	4:06.05	
3rd place, bronze medalist(s)	5	Boglárka Kapás	Hungary	4:06.90	
4	6	Ajna Késely	Hungary	4:07.42	
5	7	Beril Böcekler	Turkey	4:08.18	
6	8	Julia Hassler	Liechtenstein	4:08.23	NR
7	2	Merve Tuncel	Turkey	4:10.97	
8	1	Holly Hibbott	Great Britain	4:11.54	
