= Swimming at the 2019 World Aquatics Championships – Women's 400 metre freestyle =

Women's 400-metre freestyle at the 2019 World Aquatics Championships
- Venue: Nambu University Municipal Aquatics Center
- Location: Gwangju, South Korea
- Dates: 21 July (heats and final)
- Competitors: 43 from 37 nations
- Winning time: 3:58.76

Medalists
gold medal	Ariarne Titmus	Australia
silver medal	Katie Ledecky	United States
bronze medal	Leah Smith	United States

The women's 400-metre freestyle competition at the 2019 World Championships was held on 21 July 2019. Ariarne Titmus overcame a .62-second deficit in the last 50 metres to defeat defending champion Katie Ledecky. This was Ledecky's first loss in a major international 400 metre freestyle competition.

== Records ==
Prior to the competition, the existing world and championship records were as follows.

World record	Katie Ledecky (USA)	3:56.46	Rio de Janeiro, Brazil	7 August 2016
Competition record	Katie Ledecky (USA)	3:58.34	Budapest, Hungary	23 July 2017

== Results ==
=== Heats ===
The heats were held at 11:22.

Rank	Heat	Lane	Name	Nationality	Time	Notes
1	5	4	Katie Ledecky	United States	4:01.84	Q
2	4	4	Ariarne Titmus	Australia	4:02.42	Q
3	4	3	Ajna Késely	Hungary	4:03.51	Q
4	4	5	Wang Jianjiahe	China	4:03.97	Q
5	5	5	Leah Smith	United States	4:04.53	Q
6	4	2	Veronika Andrusenko	Russia	4:06.28	Q
7	5	2	Boglárka Kapás	Hungary	4:07.05	Q
8	5	7	Anna Egorova	Russia	4:07.10	Q
9	5	3	Li Bingjie	China	4:07.88	
10	5	6	Holly Hibbott	Great Britain	4:07.92	
11	4	6	Kiah Melverton	Australia	4:09.56	
12	4	8	Emma O'Croinin	Canada	4:09.68	
13	3	4	Barbora Seemanová	Czech Republic	4:09.73	NR
14	3	3	Marlene Kahler	Austria	4:10.49	
15	4	7	Mireia Belmonte	Spain	4:10.82	
16	5	8	Joanna Evans	Bahamas	4:11.06	
17	5	0	Erika Fairweather	New Zealand	4:12.30	
18	5	9	Valentine Dumont	Belgium	4:12.92	
19	3	6	Nguyễn Thị Ánh Viên	Vietnam	4:13.35	
20	5	1	Chihiro Igarashi	Japan	4:13.81	
21	4	0	Julia Hassler	Liechtenstein	4:13.91	
22	2	4	Monique Olivier	Luxembourg	4:14.29	NR
23	3	7	Duné Coetzee	South Africa	4:14.39	
24	4	1	Mackenzie Padington	Canada	4:16.06	
25	2	6	Laura Lahtinen	Finland	4:16.43	NR
26	3	5	Katja Fain	Slovenia	4:17.57	
27	4	9	Diana Durães	Portugal	4:17.87	
28	3	0	Gan Ching Hwee	Singapore	4:17.89	
29	3	1	Elisbet Gámez	Cuba	4:18.19	
30	2	5	Natthanan Junkrajang	Thailand	4:19.00	
31	3	8	Nicole Oliva	Philippines	4:20.03	
32	3	2	Ryu Ji-won	South Korea	4:21.70	
33	2	3	María Álvarez	Colombia	4:22.46	
34	2	2	Sara Pastrana	Honduras	4:27.65	
35	2	1	Amanda Alfaro	Costa Rica	4:29.91	
36	1	3	Talita Te Flan	Ivory Coast	4:34.04	
37	2	7	Daila Ismatul	Guatemala	4:34.75	
38	3	9	Diana Zlobina	Kazakhstan	4:35.38	
39	2	9	Tiana Rabarijaona	Madagascar	4:36.73	
40	2	0	Danielle Treasure	Barbados	4:37.22	
41	2	8	Raya Embury-Brown	Cayman Islands	4:38.17	
42	1	4	Natalia Kuipers	Virgin Islands	4:41.69	
43	1	5	Tinatin Kevlishvili	Georgia	4:49.73	

=== Final ===
The final was held at 20:33.

Rank	Lane	Name	Nationality	Time	Notes
1st place, gold medalist(s)	5	Ariarne Titmus	Australia	3:58.76	OC
2nd place, silver medalist(s)	4	Katie Ledecky	United States	3:59.97	
3rd place, bronze medalist(s)	2	Leah Smith	United States	4:01.29	
4	3	Ajna Késely	Hungary	4:01.31	NR
5	6	Wang Jianjiahe	China	4:03.67	
6	1	Boglárka Kapás	Hungary	4:05.36	
7	8	Anna Egorova	Russia	4:06.16	
8	7	Veronika Andrusenko	Russia	4:08.60	
