= Guatemala at the 2017 World Aquatics Championships =

- Flag of Guatemala
- World Aquatics code: GUA
- National federation: Federacíon Guatemaltecá de Natacíon
- Website: cdag.com.gt/federacion/natacion

in Budapest, Hungary
- Competitors: 6 in 2 sports
- Medals: Gold 0 Silver 0 Bronze 0 Total 0

World Aquatics Championships appearances
- 1973; 1975; 1978; 1982; 1986; 1991; 1994; 1998; 2001; 2003; 2005; 2007; 2009; 2011; 2013; 2015; 2017; 2019; 2022; 2023; 2024; 2025

Guatemala is scheduled to compete at the 2017 World Aquatics Championships in Budapest, Hungary from 14 July to 30 July.

== Open water swimming ==
Guatemala has entered two open water swimmers

Athlete	Event	Time	Rank
Emilio Avila	Men's 5 km	1:01:28.8	56
Cindy Toscano	Women's 5 km	1:11:55.7	57
Cindy Toscano	Women's 10 km	2:28:21.8	59

== Swimming ==
Guatemalan swimmers have achieved qualifying standards in the following events (up to a maximum of 2 swimmers in each event at the A-standard entry time, and 1 at the B-standard):

Athlete	Event	Heat		Semifinal		Final	
Athlete	Event	Time	Rank	Time	Rank	Time	Rank
Kevin Avila Soto	Men's 50 m freestyle	23.84	=74	did not advance			
Kevin Avila Soto	Men's 100 m freestyle	52.18	68	did not advance			
Luis Martínez	Men's 50 m butterfly	23.71	18	did not advance			
Luis Martínez	Men's 100 m butterfly	52.18	21	did not advance			
Luis Martínez	Men's 200 m butterfly	2:03.10	37	did not advance			
Alicia Mancilla	Women's 1500 m freestyle	17:15.04	19	—N/a		did not advance	
Alicia Mancilla	Women's 200 m butterfly	2:20.58	32	did not advance			
Gabriela Santis	Women's 100 m freestyle	59.54	56	did not advance			
Gabriela Santis	Women's 200 m freestyle	2:06.94	37	did not advance			
