= Swimming at the 2022 European Aquatics Championships – Women's 800 metre freestyle =

Women's 800 metre freestyle at the 2022 European Aquatics Championships
- Venue: Foro Italico
- Dates: 11 August (heats); 12 August (final)
- Competitors: 25 from 16 nations
- Winning time: 8:20.54

Medalists
gold medal	Simona Quadarella	Italy
silver medal	Isabel Gose	Germany
bronze medal	Merve Tuncel	Turkey

The Women's 800 metre freestyle competition of the 2022 European Aquatics Championships was held on 11 and 12 August 2022.

== Records ==
Prior to the competition, the existing world, European and championship records were as follows.

	Name	Nation	Time	Location	Date
World record	Katie Ledecky	United States	8:04.79	Rio de Janeiro	12 August 2016
European record	Rebecca Adlington	Great Britain	8:14.10	Beijing	16 August 2008
Championship record	Jazmin Carlin	Great Britain	8:15.54	Berlin	21 August 2014

== Results ==
=== Heats ===
The heats were started on 11 August at 10:37.

Rank	Heat	Lane	Name	Nationality	Time	Notes
1	3	4	Simona Quadarella	Italy	8:23.46	Q
2	2	4	Isabel Gose	Germany	8:30.01	Q
3	3	5	Merve Tuncel	Turkey	8:31.12	Q
4	3	3	Martina Caramignoli	Italy	8:33.25	Q
5	3	6	Tamila Holub	Portugal	8:34.25	Q
6	2	6	Paula Otero	Spain	8:35.60	Q
7	2	5	Deniz Ertan	Turkey	8:36.27	Q
8	2	3	Leonie Beck	Germany	8:36.43	Q
9	2	2	Ángela Martínez	Spain	8:39.32	
10	3	8	Imani de Jong	Netherlands	8:40.48	
11	2	7	Bettina Fábián	Hungary	8:40.83	
12	2	8	Alisée Pisane	Belgium	8:44.88	
13	3	1	Paulina Piechota	Poland	8:45.19	
14	3	7	Diana Durães	Portugal	8:47.42	
15	3	2	Celine Rieder	Germany	8:47.43	
16	3	9	Lucie Hanquet	Belgium	8:48.44	
17	2	1	Klaudia Tarasiewicz	Poland	8:50.65	
18	2	9	Lena Opatril	Austria	8:54.66	
19	1	5	Grace Hodgins	Ireland	8:57.87	
20	1	3	Noemi Freimann	Switzerland	8:59.60	
21	3	0	Duru Tanrıverdi	Turkey	9:00.48	
22	2	0	Thilda Häll	Sweden	9:01.63	
22	1	4	Zhanet Angelova	Bulgaria	9:13.74	
24	1	6	Vár Erlingsdóttir Eidesgaard	Faroe Islands	9:18.49	
25	1	2	Sara Dande	Albania	9:55.43	

=== Final ===
The final was held on 12 August at 19:27.

Rank	Lane	Name	Nationality	Time	Notes
1st place, gold medalist(s)	4	Simona Quadarella	Italy	8:20.54	
2nd place, silver medalist(s)	5	Isabel Gose	Germany	8:22.01	
3rd place, bronze medalist(s)	3	Merve Tuncel	Turkey	8:24.33	
4	1	Deniz Ertan	Turkey	8:24.94	
5	6	Martina Caramignoli	Italy	8:31.30	
6	2	Tamila Holub	Portugal	8:36.36	
7	7	Paula Otero	Spain	8:36.51	
8	8	Leonie Beck	Germany	8:39.04	
