= Swimming at the 2018 European Aquatics Championships – Women's 800 metre freestyle =

Women's 800 metre freestyle at the 2018 European Aquatics Championships
- Venue: Tollcross International Swimming Centre
- Dates: 3 August (heats); 4 August (final)
- Competitors: 18 from 13 nations
- Winning time: 8:16.35

Medalists
gold medal	Simona Quadarella	Italy
silver medal	Ajna Késely	Hungary
bronze medal	Anna Egorova	Russia

The Women's 800 metre freestyle competition of the 2018 European Aquatics Championships was held on 3 and 4 August 2018.

== Records ==
Before the competition, the existing world and championship records were as follows.

	Name	Nation	Time	Location	Date
World record	Katie Ledecky	United States	8:04.79	Rio de Janeiro	12 August 2016
European record	Rebecca Adlington	Great Britain	8:14.10	Beijing	16 August 2008
Championship record	Jazmin Carlin	Great Britain	8:15.54	Berlin	21 August 2014

== Results ==
=== Heats ===
The heats were started on 3 August at 11:23.

Rank	Heat	Lane	Name	Nationality	Time	Notes
1	1	4	Simona Quadarella	Italy	8:23.93	Q
2	1	5	Ajna Késely	Hungary	8:27.96	Q
3	2	6	Anna Egorova	Russia	8:29.27	Q
4	2	4	Sarah Köhler	Germany	8:31.96	Q
5	2	5	Boglárka Kapás	Hungary	8:32.32	Q
6	1	2	Jimena Pérez	Spain	8:32.46	Q
7	2	3	Tjaša Oder	Slovenia	8:33.12	Q
8	2	2	Julia Hassler	Liechtenstein	8:33.40	Q
9	1	3	Diana Durães	Portugal	8:35.53	
10	1	7	Tamila Holub	Portugal	8:37.10	
11	1	6	Celine Rieder	Germany	8:37.85	
12	1	8	Helena Bach	Denmark	8:42.46	
13	2	7	Marlene Kahler	Austria	8:46.82	
14	2	0	Maria Grandt	Denmark	8:48.68	
15	1	1	Beril Böcekler	Turkey	8:54.23	
16	1	0	Arianna Valloni	San Marino	8:57.11	
17	2	8	Hanna Eriksson	Sweden	8:58.55	
18	2	1	Katja Fain	Slovenia	9:01.55	
—	2	9	Fatima Alkaramova	Azerbaijan	Did not start	

=== Final ===
The final was held on 4 August at 17:00.

Rank	Lane	Name	Nationality	Time	Notes
1st place, gold medalist(s)	4	Simona Quadarella	Italy	8:16.45	
2nd place, silver medalist(s)	5	Ajna Késely	Hungary	8:22.01	
3rd place, bronze medalist(s)	3	Anna Egorova	Russia	8:24.71	
4	6	Sarah Köhler	Germany	8:25.91	
5	2	Boglárka Kapás	Hungary	8:26.42	
6	1	Tjaša Oder	Slovenia	8:30.18	
7	8	Julia Hassler	Liechtenstein	8:33.10	
8	7	Jimena Pérez	Spain	8:35.61	
