= Swimming at the 2022 European Aquatics Championships – Women's 400 metre freestyle =

European swimming competition

Women's 400 metre freestyle at the 2022 European Aquatics Championships
- Venue: Foro Italico
- Dates: 17 August
- Competitors: 33 from 18 nations
- Winning time: 4:04.13

Medalists
gold medal	Isabel Marie Gose	Germany
silver medal	Simona Quadarella	Italy
bronze medal	Ajna Késely	Hungary

The Women's 400 metre freestyle competition of the 2022 European Aquatics Championships was held on 17 August 2022.

== Records ==
Prior to the competition, the existing world, European and championship records were as follows.

	Name	Nation	Time	Location	Date
World record	Ariarne Titmus	Australia	3:56.40	Adelaide	22 May 2022
European record	Federica Pellegrini	Italy	3:59.15	Rome	26 July 2009
Championship record	Federica Pellegrini	Italy	4:01.53	Eindhoven	24 March 2008

== Results ==
=== Heats ===
The heats were started at 09:00.

Rank	Heat	Lane	Name	Nationality	Time	Notes
1	4	4	Isabel Marie Gose	Germany	4:06.10	Q
2	3	4	Simona Quadarella	Italy	4:08.80	Q
3	3	5	Bettina Fábián	Hungary	4:10.46	Q
4	4	6	Katja Fain	Slovenia	4:10.67	Q
5	3	6	Julia Mrozinski	Germany	4:11.03	Q
6	3	7	Valentine Dumont	Belgium	4:11.27	Q
7	4	5	Ajna Késely	Hungary	4:11.81	Q
8	4	2	Antonietta Cesarano	Italy	4:12.35	Q
9	2	8	Viktória Mihályvári-Farkas	Hungary	4:13.76	
10	4	1	Imani de Jong	Netherlands	4:13.87	
11	3	8	Paula Otero	Spain	4:14.19	
12	4	7	Noemi Cesarano	Italy	4:15.72	
13	4	8	Silke Holkenborg	Netherlands	4:16.30	
14	2	1	Alisée Pisane	Belgium	4:16.84	
15	1	4	Lucie Hanquet	Belgium	4:16.89	
16	2	0	Lena Opatril	Austria	4:17.98	
17	3	1	Mireia Belmonte	Spain	4:18.33	
18	3	9	Lara Seifert	Germany	4:18.75	
19	3	3	Freya Colbert	Great Britain	4:18.92	
20	2	5	Klaudia Tarasiewicz	Poland	4:19.28	
21	2	4	Monique Olivier	Luxembourg	4:19.84	
22	1	5	Karyna Snitko	Ukraine	4:20.72	
23	2	2	Zhanet Angelova	Bulgaria	4:20.74	
24	2	7	Marina Heller Hansen	Denmark	4:22.47	
25	2	6	Celine Rieder	Germany	4:22.58	
26	1	3	Wiktoria Guść	Poland	4:22.69	
27	1	6	Caroline Wiuff Jensen	Denmark	4:22.73	
28	2	3	Ainhoa Campabadal	Spain	4:22.94	
29	3	0	Janna van Kooten	Netherlands	4:23.29	
30	2	9	Thilda Häll	Sweden	4:25.05	
31	1	2	Grace Hodgins	Ireland	4:25.81	
32	1	7	Vár Erlingsdóttir Eidesgaard	Faroe Islands	4:28.63	
33	1	1	Sara Dande	Albania	4:46.23	
	3	2	Martina Caramignoli	Italy	Did not start	
	4	0	Aleksandra Knop	Poland	Did not start	
	4	3	Freya Anderson	Great Britain	Did not start	
	4	9	Tamryn van Selm	Great Britain	Did not start	

=== Final ===
The final was held at 18:44.

Rank	Lane	Name	Nationality	Time	Notes
1st place, gold medalist(s)	4	Isabel Marie Gose	Germany	4:04.13	
2nd place, silver medalist(s)	5	Simona Quadarella	Italy	4:04.77	
3rd place, bronze medalist(s)	1	Ajna Késely	Hungary	4:08.00	
4	3	Bettina Fábián	Hungary	4:08.63	
5	6	Katja Fain	Slovenia	4:08.70	
6	8	Antonietta Cesarano	Italy	4:10.19	
7	7	Valentine Dumont	Belgium	4:10.51	
8	2	Julia Mrozinski	Germany	4:11.32	
