= Swimming at the 2026 European Aquatics Championships – Women's 800 metre freestyle =

Women's 800 metre freestyle at the 2026 European Aquatics Championships
- Venue: Paris Aquatic Centre
- Dates: 10 August (heats); 11 August (final)
- Competitors: 21 from 16 nations
- Winning time: 8:15.55

Medalists
gold medal	Simona Quadarella	Italy
silver medal	Isabel Gose	Germany
bronze medal	Maya Werner	Germany

The Women's 800 metre freestyle competition of the 2026 European Aquatics Championships was held on 10 and 11 August 2026.

== Records ==
Prior to the competition, the existing world, European and championship records were as follows:

	Name	Nation	Time	Location	Date
World record	Katie Ledecky	United States	8:04.12	Fort Lauderdale	3 May 2025
European record	Simona Quadarella	Italy	8:12.81	Singapore	2 August 2025
Championship record	Jazmin Carlin	Great Britain	8:15.54	Berlin	21 August 2014

== Results ==
=== Heats ===
The heats were started on 10 August at 11:46.

Qualification Rules: The 8 fastest from the heats qualify to the final.

Rank	Heat	Lane	Swimmer	Nation	Time	Notes
1	3	4	Simona Quadarella	Italy	8:23.17	Q
2	2	4	Isabel Gose	Germany	8:26.01	Q
3	3	5	Vivien Jackl	Hungary	8:28.87	Q
4	2	5	Maya Werner	Germany	8:32.79	Q
5	3	7	Thilda Häll	Sweden	8:33.12	Q, NR
6	3	6	Artemis Vasilaki	Greece	8:33.76	Q
7	2	3	Francisca Martins	Portugal	8:35.94	Q
8	2	6	María de Valdés	Spain	8:36.76	Q
9	3	3	Sarah Dumont	Belgium	8:39.60	
10	3	2	Arina Pantina	Neutral Athletes B	8:40.86	
11	2	8	Malla Hämäläinen	Finland	8:41.02	
12	2	0	Hanne Stamnesfet Næss	Norway	8:41.51	
13	2	1	Bea Hovda	Norway	8:42.64	
14	3	8	Anna Kalandadze	Georgia	8:43.29	
15	2	7	Anna Arshavskaia	Neutral Athletes B	8:43.87	
16	2	2	Klaudia Tarasiewicz	Poland	8:46.10	
17	3	0	Vanna Djakovic	Switzerland	8:47.63	
18	1	3	Ada Hakkarainen	Finland	8:50.02	
19	3	1	Marte Hieke van der Kamp	Netherlands	8:51.88	
20	1	5	Lou Jominet	Luxembourg	9:01.38	
21	1	4	Leonie-Sarah Josephine Tenzer	Finland	9:06.94	

=== Final ===
The final took place on the evening of 11 August.

Rank	Lane	Swimmer	Nation	Time	Notes
1st place, gold medalist(s)	4	Simona Quadarella	Italy	8:15.55	
2nd place, silver medalist(s)	5	Isabel Gose	Germany	8:18.44	
3rd place, bronze medalist(s)	6	Maya Werner	Germany	8:22.55	
4	7	Artemis Vasilaki	Greece	8:26.38	
5	3	Vivien Jackl	Hungary	8:26.91	
6	2	Thilda Häll	Sweden	8:31.52	NR
7	8	María de Valdés	Spain	8:37.23	
8	1	Francisca Martins	Portugal	8:41.50	
