= Guatemala at the 2013 World Aquatics Championships =

- Flag of Guatemala
- World Aquatics code: GUA
- National federation: Federacíon Guatemaltecá de Natacíon
- Website: cdag.com.gt/federacion/natacion

in Barcelona, Spain
- Competitors: 4 in 2 sports
- Medals: Gold 0 Silver 0 Bronze 0 Total 0

World Aquatics Championships appearances
- 1973; 1975; 1978; 1982; 1986; 1991; 1994; 1998; 2001; 2003; 2005; 2007; 2009; 2011; 2013; 2015; 2017; 2019; 2022; 2023; 2024; 2025

Guatemala competed at the 2013 World Aquatics Championships in Barcelona, Spain between 19 July and 4 August 2013.

== Open water swimming ==
Guatemala qualified four quota places for the following events in open water swimming.

| Athlete | Event | Time | Rank |
|---|---|---|---|
| Manuel Meneses | Men's 5 km | 1:00:08.5 | 47 |
| Manuel Meneses | Men's 10 km | 2:09:15.8 | 60 |
| Valerie Gruest | Women's 5 km | 1:03:03.8 | 36 |
| Valerie Gruest | Women's 10 km | 2:04:45.3 | =39 |

== Swimming ==
Guatemalan swimmers achieved qualifying standards in the following events (up to a maximum of 2 swimmers in each event at the A-standard entry time, and 1 at the B-standard):

Men

| Athlete | Event | Heat | | Semifinal | | Final | |
| Athlete | Event | Time | Rank | Time | Rank | Time | Rank |
|---|---|---|---|---|---|---|---|
| Kevin Avila Soto | 100 m freestyle | 52.56 | 55 | did not advance | | | |
| Kevin Avila Soto | 200 m freestyle | 1:56.74 | 54 | did not advance | | | |

Women

| Athlete | Event | Heat | | Semifinal | | Final | |
| Athlete | Event | Time | Rank | Time | Rank | Time | Rank |
|---|---|---|---|---|---|---|---|
| Valerie Gruest | 800 m freestyle | 8:59.70 | 30 | —N/a | | did not advance | |
| Valerie Gruest | 1500 m freestyle | 17.14.19 | 21 | —N/a | | did not advance | |
| Gisela Morales | 50 m backstroke | 29.42 | 32 | did not advance | | | |
| Gisela Morales | 100 m backstroke | 1:02.12 | 26 | did not advance | | | |
| Gisela Morales | 200 m backstroke | 2:15.63 | 30 | did not advance | | | |
