= Swimming at the 2023 World Aquatics Championships – Women's 1500 metre freestyle =

Women's 1500 metre freestyle at the 2023 World Aquatics Championships
- Venue: Marine Messe Fukuoka
- Location: Fukuoka, Japan
- Dates: 24 July (heats); 25 July (final)
- Competitors: 31 from 23 nations
- Winning time: 15:26.27

Medalists
gold medal	Katie Ledecky	United States
silver medal	Simona Quadarella	Italy
bronze medal	Li Bingjie	China

The women's 1500 metre freestyle competition at the 2023 World Aquatics Championships was held on 24 and 25 July 2023.

== Records ==
Prior to the competition, the existing world and championship records were as follows.

World record	Katie Ledecky (USA)	15:20.48	Indianapolis, United States	16 May 2018
Competition record	Katie Ledecky (USA)	15:25.48	Kazan, Russia	4 August 2015

== Results ==
=== Heats ===
The heats were started on 24 July at 11:55.

Rank	Heat	Lane	Name	Nationality	Time	Notes
1	4	4	Katie Ledecky	United States	15:41.22	Q
2	4	3	Simona Quadarella	Italy	15:55.05	Q
3	4	5	Lani Pallister	Australia	15:58.11	Q
4	3	5	Li Bingjie	China	15:58.81	Q
5	3	2	Isabel Gose	Germany	15:59.67	Q
6	4	6	Anastasiya Kirpichnikova	France	16:00.40	Q
7	3	4	Katie Grimes	United States	16:01.47	Q
8	4	7	Beatriz Dizotti	Brazil	16:01.95	Q, NR
9	3	3	Moesha Johnson	Australia	16:05.01	
10	4	1	Kristel Köbrich	Chile	16:11.25	
11	3	6	Gao Weizhong	China	16:12.94	
12	3	9	Emma Finlin	Canada	16:15.77	
13	4	0	Yukimi Moriyama	Japan	16:18.66	
14	2	1	Gan Ching Hwee	Singapore	16:20.88	NR
15	4	9	Ángela Martínez	Spain	16:24.38	
16	2	4	Caitlin Deans	New Zealand	16:24.56	
17	3	1	Eve Thomas	New Zealand	16:24.88	
18	2	5	Alisee Pisane	Belgium	16:25.15	
19	4	2	Viktoria Mihalyvari-Farkas	Hungary	16:25.16	
20	3	0	Tamila Holub	Portugal	16:30.39	
21	3	7	Viviane Jungblut	Brazil	16:30.99	
22	2	6	Nora Fluck	Hungary	16:34.63	
23	3	8	Paula Otero	Spain	16:38.73	
24	4	8	Merve Tuncel	Turkey	16:39.30	
25	2	2	Imani de Jong	Netherlands	16:51.22	
26	2	7	Han Da-kyung	South Korea	17:01.57	
27	1	4	María Bramont-Arias	Peru	17:04.19	
28	2	3	Diana Durães	Portugal	17:05.18	
29	1	5	Diana Taszhanova	Kazakhstan	17:09.98	NR
30	2	8	Võ Thị Mỹ Thiện	Vietnam	17:25.13	
31	1	3	Malak Meqdar	Morocco	17:46.69	

=== Final ===
The final was held on 25 July at 20:10.

Rank	Lane	Name	Nationality	Time	Notes
1st place, gold medalist(s)	4	Katie Ledecky	United States	15:26.27	
2nd place, silver medalist(s)	5	Simona Quadarella	Italy	15:43.31	
3rd place, bronze medalist(s)	6	Li Bingjie	China	15:45.71	
4	7	Anastasiya Kirpichnikova	France	15:48.53	NR
5	3	Lani Pallister	Australia	15:49.17	
6	2	Isabel Gose	Germany	15:54.58	
7	8	Beatriz Dizotti	Brazil	16:03.70	
8	1	Katie Grimes	United States	16:04.21	
