= Kristina Miletić =

Croatian swimmer (born 2000)

Personal information
- Nationality: Croatian
- Born: 21 April 2000 (age 26)

Sport
- Sport: Swimming

Kristina Miletić (born 21 April 2000) is a Croatian swimmer. She competed in the women's 400 metre freestyle event at the 2018 FINA World Swimming Championships (25 m), in Hangzhou, China. She also competed in the women's 800 metre freestyle event.
