= Tinatin Kevlishvili =

Georgian swimmer

Personal information
- Born: 25 July 2002 (age 23)

Sport
- Sport: Swimming

Tinatin Kevlishvili (born 25 July 2002) is a Georgian swimmer.

In 2018, she competed in the women's 200 metre freestyle and women's 400 metre freestyle events at the 2018 FINA World Swimming Championships (25 m) held in Hangzhou, China. In both events she did not advance to compete in the final.

In 2019, she represented Georgia at the 2019 World Aquatics Championships held in Gwangju, South Korea. She competed in the women's 200 metre freestyle and women's 400 metre freestyle events. In the 200 metre event she did not advance to compete in the semi-finals and in the 400 metre event she did not advance to compete in the final.
