= Sabína Kupčová =

Slovak swimmer

Personal information
- Nationality: Slovak
- Born: 28 February 2003 (age 23)

Sport
- Sport: Swimming

Sabína Kupčová (born 28 February 2003) is a Slovak swimmer. She competed in the women's 400 metre freestyle event at the 2018 FINA World Swimming Championships (25 m), in Hangzhou, China and also in the 200 metre freestyle and 4 x 100 metre freestyle relay events of the 2021 FINA World Swimming Championships (25 m) in Abu Dhabi without reaching the finals.
