= Swimming at the 2026 European Aquatics Championships – Women's 1500 metre freestyle =

Women's 1500 metre freestyle at the 2026 European Aquatics Championships
- Venue: Paris Aquatic Centre
- Dates: 13 August (heats); 14 August (final)
- Competitors: 22 from 14 nations
- Winning time: 15:46.22 CR

Medalists
gold medal	Simona Quadarella	Italy
silver medal	Isabel Gose	Germany
bronze medal	Maya Werner	Germany

The Women's 1500 metre freestyle competition of the 2026 European Aquatics Championships was held on 13 and 14 August 2026.

== Records ==
Prior to the competition, the existing world, European and championship records were as follows:

	Name	Nation	Time	Location	Date
World record	Katie Ledecky	United States	15:20.48	Indianapolis	16 May 2018
European record	Simona Quadarella	Italy	15:31.79	Singapore	29 July 2025
Championship record	Boglárka Kapás	Hungary	15:50.22	London	21 May 2016

== Results ==
=== Heats ===
The heats were started on 13 August at 11:07.

Qualification Rules: The 8 fastest from the heats qualify to the final.

Rank	Heat	Lane	Swimmer	Nation	Time	Notes
1	3	4	Simona Quadarella	Italy	16:05.28	Q
2	3	5	Kseniia Misharina	Neutral Athletes B	16:08.71	Q
3	2	4	Isabel Gose	Germany	16:10.51	Q
4	2	2	Artemis Vasilaki	Greece	16:13.81	Q
5	2	5	Vivien Jackl	Hungary	16:16.34	Q
6	3	3	Maya Werner	Germany	16:17.78	Q
7	3	2	María de Valdés	Spain	16:18.54	Q
8	2	3	Ángela Martínez	Spain	16:22.43	Q
9	3	1	Thilda Häll	Sweden	16:29.12	
10	3	7	Hanne Stamnesfet Næss	Norway	16:30.08	NR
11	2	1	Klaudia Tarasiewciz	Poland	16:35.12	
12	2	6	Anna Arshavskaia	Neutral Athletes B	16:35.19	
13	3	6	Paula Otero	Spain	16:36.80	
14	2	8	Vanna Djakovic	Switzerland	16:41.02	
15	3	0	Malla Hämäläinen	Finland	16:43.31	
16	2	0	Anna Sofia Kalandadze	Georgia	16:43.56	
17	3	9	Bea Hovda	Norway	16:50.39	
18	3	7	Arina Pantina	Neutral Athletes B	16:53.30	
19	2	7	Marte Hieke van der Kamp	Netherlands	16:55.84	
20	1	5	Ada Hakkarainen	Finland	17:03.73	
21	1	3	Lou Jominet	Luxembourg	17:04.69	
22	1	4	Leonie-Sarah Tenzer	Finland	17:05.82	

=== Final ===
The final was held on 14 August at 19:56.

Rank	Lane	Swimmer	Nation	Time	Notes
1st place, gold medalist(s)	4	Simona Quadarella	Italy	15:46.22	CR
2nd place, silver medalist(s)	3	Isabel Gose	Germany	15:49.31	
3rd place, bronze medalist(s)	7	Maya Werner	Germany	15:52.50	
4	2	Vivien Jackl	Hungary	15:57.39	
5	5	Kseniia Misharina	Neutral Athletes B	16:09.12	
6	8	Ángela Martínez	Spain	16:20.35	
7	6	Artemis Vasilaki	Greece	16:21.26	
8	1	María de Valdés	Spain	16:32.71	
