= Hayley McIntosh =

New Zealand swimmer

Personal information
- Nationality: New Zealand
- Born: 12 April 1999 (age 27)
- Height: 180 cm (5 ft 11 in)

Sport
- Sport: Swimming
- Strokes: Freestyle
- Club: Northwave Swim Club, Phoenix Aquatics
- Coach: Jacques Bonthuys, Monica Cooper, David Lyles

Hayley McIntosh (born 12 April 1999) is a former competitive swimmer for New Zealand. She competed at the 2020 Summer Olympics.

== Swimming career ==
=== 2016 Junior Pan Pacific championships ===
She raced at the 2016 Junior Pan Pacific Swimming Championships held in Hawaii, United States. Finishing 15th in the 800 metre freestyle in a time of 9:08.27 and 25th in the 400 metre freestyle in a time of 4:25.18.

=== 2018 World championships ===
McIntosh competed at the 2018 FINA World Swimming Championships (25 m), in Hangzhou, China. Her results included an 18th-place finish in the women's 800 metre freestyle in a time of 8:40.35, a 23rd-place finish in the women's 400 metre freestyle in a time of 4:12.50. She also competed in the women's 4 × 200 metre freestyle relay alongside Paige Flynn, Emma Godwin and Caitlin Deans that finished 10th.

=== 2020 Olympics ===
Requiring a further three second personal best in the 1500 metre freestyle, McIntosh knocked off the required time in her final chance at qualifying for the 2020 Summer Olympics competing in Hamilton with a time of 16:28.96 and joined Eve Thomas as the second New Zealander to compete in the race at the games.

At the games, McIntosh finished 31st in a time of 16:44.43 in the 1500 metre freestyle.

Following the 2020 Summer Olympics, McIntosh retired from the sport.
