= Guatemala at the 2015 World Aquatics Championships =

- Flag of Guatemala
- FINA code: GUA
- National federation: Federacíon Guatemaltecá de Natacíon
- Website: cdag.com.gt/federacion/natacion

in Kazan, Russia
- Competitors: 6 in 2 sports
- Medals: Gold 0 Silver 0 Bronze 0 Total 0

World Aquatics Championships appearances
- 1973; 1975; 1978; 1982; 1986; 1991; 1994; 1998; 2001; 2003; 2005; 2007; 2009; 2011; 2013; 2015; 2017; 2019; 2022; 2023; 2024

Guatemala competed at the 2015 World Aquatics Championships in Kazan, Russia from 24 July to 9 August 2015.

== Open water swimming ==
Guatemala has qualified two swimmers to compete in the open water marathon.

Athlete	Event	Time	Rank
Emilio Ávila	Men's 5 km	1:00:31.2	41
Emilio Ávila	Men's 10 km	2:14:15.4	66
Cindy Toscano	Women's 5 km	1:06:19.2	33
Cindy Toscano	Women's 10 km	2:16:15.8	46

== Swimming ==
Guatemalan swimmers have achieved qualifying standards in the following events (up to a maximum of 2 swimmers in each event at the A-standard entry time, and 1 at the B-standard):

Men

Athlete	Event	Heat		Semifinal		Final	
Athlete	Event	Time	Rank	Time	Rank	Time	Rank
Luís Carlo Martinéz	50 m butterfly	24.20	33	did not advance			
Luís Carlo Martinéz	100 m butterfly	52.72	25	did not advance			

Women

Athlete	Event	Heat		Semifinal		Final	
Athlete	Event	Time	Rank	Time	Rank	Time	Rank
Valerie Gruest	800 m freestyle	8:39.88	20	—		did not advance	
Valerie Gruest	1500 m freestyle	16:34.81	17	—		did not advance	
Valerie Gruest	200 m butterfly	2:12.82	23	did not advance			
Gisela Morales	50 m backstroke	28.94	27	did not advance			
Gisela Morales	100 m backstroke	1:02.09	35	did not advance			
Gisela Morales	200 m backstroke	2:12.92	23	did not advance			
Gabriela Santis	400 m freestyle	4:25.92	39	—		did not advance	
