= Swimming at the 2026 European Aquatics Championships – Women's 400 metre freestyle =

European swimming competition

Women's 400 metre freestyle at the 2026 European Aquatics Championships
- Venue: Paris Aquatic Centre
- Dates: 16 August (heats and final)
- Competitors: 26 from 19 nations
- Winning time: 4:01.34 CR

Medalists
gold medal	Simona Quadarella	Italy
silver medal	Isabel Gose	Germany
bronze medal	Maya Werner	Germany

The Women's 400 metre freestyle competition of the 2026 European Aquatics Championships was held on 16 August 2026.

== Records ==
Prior to the competition, the existing world, European and championship records were as follows.

	Name	Nation	Time	Location	Date
World record	Summer McIntosh	Canada	3:54.18	Toronto	7 June 2025
European record	Federica Pellegrini	Italy	3:59.15	Rome	26 July 2009
Championship record	Federica Pellegrini	Italy	4:01.53	Eindhoven	24 March 2008

== Results ==
=== Heats ===
The heats were started at 09:30.
Qualification Rules: The 8 fastest from the heats qualify to the final.

Rank	Heat	Lane	Name	Nationality	Time	Notes
1	4	5	Maya Werner	Germany	4:05.40	Q
2	4	4	Isabel Gose	Germany	4:06.37	Q
3	4	6	Francisca Martins	Portugal	4:08.01	Q
4	3	4	Simona Quadarella	Italy	4:08.07	Q
5	4	3	Linda Roth	Germany	4:08.42	
6	3	6	Kseniia Misharina	Neutral Athletes B	4:09.78	Q
7	3	2	Sarah Dumont	Belgium	4:11.03	Q
8	3	1	Artemis Vasilaki	Greece	4:11.70	Q
9	3	7	Barbora Seemanová	Czech Republic	4:12.05	Q
10	2	4	Bea Hovda	Norway	4:12.08	
11	4	8	Thilda Häll	Sweden	4:12.09	
12	3	3	Sofia Diakova	Neutral Athletes B	4:12.25	
13	2	3	Vanna Djakovic	Switzerland	4:14.07	
14	4	0	Daria Golovaty	Israel	4:14.81	
15	3	8	Paula Otero	Spain	4:17.03	
16	2	7	Malla Hämäläinen	Finland	4:17.16	
17	4	1	Arina Pantina	Neutral Athletes B	4:17.58	
18	4	9	Klaudia Tarasiewicz	Poland	4:17.63	
19	1	3	Hanne Stamnesfet Næss	Norway	4:18.76	
20	2	1	Anna Sofia Kalandadze	Georgia	4:19.01	
21	1	5	Ada Hakkarainen	Finland	4:19.62	
22	2	8	Nynke Boerefijn	Netherlands	4:20.37	
23	2	0	Iman Avdić	Bosnia and Herzegovina	4:20.62	
24	3	9	Marte Hieke van der Kamp	Netherlands	4:21.39	
25	1	2	Ieva Visockaitė	Lithuania	4:23.55	
26	1	4	Lou Jominet	Luxembourg	4:23.98	
	1	6	Ieva Nainytė	Lithuania	Did not start	
	2	2	Victoria Catterson	Ireland	Did not start	
	2	5	Sylvia Statkevičius	Lithuania	Did not start	
	2	6	Ieva Jurkūnaitė	Lithuania	Did not start	
	2	9	Elvira Mörtstrand	Sweden	Did not start	
	3	0	María de Valdés	Spain	Did not start	
	3	5	Freya Colbert	Great Britain	Did not start	
	4	2	Bianca Nannucci	Italy	Did not start	
	4	7	Nikolett Pádár	Hungary	Did not start	

=== Final ===
The final was held in the evening session.

Rank	Lane	Name	Nationality	Time	Notes
1st place, gold medalist(s)	6	Simona Quadarella	Italy	4:01.34	CR
2nd place, silver medalist(s)	5	Isabel Gose	Germany	4:02.41	
3rd place, bronze medalist(s)	4	Maya Werner	Germany	4:03.73	
4	3	Francisca Martins	Portugal	4:06.93	NR
5	2	Kseniia Misharina	Neutral Athletes B	4:07.76	
6	8	Barbora Seemanová	Czech Republic	4:08.16	
7	7	Sarah Dumont	Belgium	4:08.20	
8	1	Artemis Vasilaki	Greece	4:11.98	
