= Guatemala at the 2024 World Aquatics Championships =

- Flag of Guatemala
- FINA code: GUA
- National federation: National Federation of Swimming, Diving, Water Polo and Synchronized Swimming of Guatemala
- Website: fenadegua.com.gt (in Spanish)

in Doha, Qatar
- Competitors: 6 in 2 sports
- Medals: Gold 0 Silver 0 Bronze 0 Total 0

World Aquatics Championships appearances
- 1973; 1975; 1978; 1982; 1986; 1991; 1994; 1998; 2001; 2003; 2005; 2007; 2009; 2011; 2013; 2015; 2017; 2019; 2022; 2023; 2024

Guatemala competed at the 2024 World Aquatics Championships in Doha, Qatar from 2 to 18 February.

== Competitors ==
The following is the list of competitors in the Championships.

| Sport | Men | Women | Total |
|---|---|---|---|
| Open water swimming | 1 | 2 | 3 |
| Swimming | 2 | 1 | 3 |
| Total | 3 | 3 | 6 |

== Open water swimming ==
Men

| Athlete | Event | Time | Rank |
|---|---|---|---|
| Santiago Reyes | Men's 5 km | 1:00:45.5 | 67 |
| Santiago Reyes | Men's 10 km | 2:09:54.0 | 74 |

Women

| Athlete | Event | Time | Rank |
|---|---|---|---|
| María Porres | Women's 5 km | Did not start | |
| María Porres | Women's 10 km | 2:17:36.9 | 60 |
| Yanci Vanegas | Women's 5 km | 1:04:47.7 | 44 |
| Yanci Vanegas | Women's 10 km | 2:15:33.2 | 56 |

== Swimming ==
Guatemala entered 3 swimmers.

Men

| Athlete | Event | Heat | | Semifinal | | Final | |
| Athlete | Event | Time | Rank | Time | Rank | Time | Rank |
|---|---|---|---|---|---|---|---|
| Roberto Bonilla | 100 metre breaststroke | 1:09.46 | 67 | Did not advance | | | |
| Erick Gordillo | 200 metre butterflye | 2:01.75 | 28 | Did not advance | | | |
| Erick Gordillo | 200 metre individual medley | 2:04.34 | 26 | Did not advance | | | |
| Erick Gordillo | 400 metre individual medley | 4:25.34 | 19 | — | | Did not advance | |

Women

| Athlete | Event | Heat | | Semifinal | | Final | |
| Athlete | Event | Time | Rank | Time | Rank | Time | Rank |
|---|---|---|---|---|---|---|---|
| Stephanie Iannaccone | 200 metre breaststroke | 2:33.77 | 24 | Did not advance | | | |
| Stephanie Iannaccone | 200 metre individual medley | 2:18.43 | 20 | Did not advance | | | |
