= Daila Ismatul =

Guatemalan swimmer (born 2002)

Personal information
- Born: 30 September 2002 (age 23)

Sport
- Sport: Swimming

Daila Ismatul (born 30 September 2002) is a Guatemalan swimmer.

In 2019, she represented Guatemala at the 2019 World Aquatics Championships held in Gwangju, South Korea. She competed in the women's 50 metre freestyle and women's 400 metre freestyle events. In the 50 metre event she did not advance to compete in the semi-finals and in the 400 metre event she did not advance to compete in the final.
