= Guatemala at the 2022 World Aquatics Championships =

- Flag of Guatemala
- FINA code: GUA
- National federation: National Federation of Swimming, Diving, Water Polo and Synchronized Swimming of Guatemala
- Website: fenadegua.com.gt (in Spanish)

in Budapest, Hungary
- Competitors: 4 in 2 sports
- Medals: Gold 0 Silver 0 Bronze 0 Total 0

World Aquatics Championships appearances
- 1973; 1975; 1978; 1982; 1986; 1991; 1994; 1998; 2001; 2003; 2005; 2007; 2009; 2011; 2013; 2015; 2017; 2019; 2022; 2023; 2024

Guatemala competed at the 2022 World Aquatics Championships in Budapest, Hungary from 17 June to 3 July.

== Open water swimming ==
Guatemala qualified one male and one female open water swimmers.

Men

Athlete	Event	Time	Rank
Santiago Reyes	Men's 5 km	1:05:49.2	51
Santiago Reyes	Men's 10 km	2:20:53.1	58

Women

Athlete	Event	Time	Rank
María Porres	Women's 5 km	1:10:09.4	49
María Porres	Women's 10 km	2:24:08.3	54

== Swimming ==
Guatemala entered two swimmers.

Men

Athlete	Event	Heat		Semifinal		Final	
Athlete	Event	Time	Rank	Time	Rank	Time	Rank
Erick Gordillo	200 m butterfly	2:00.48	30	did not advance			
Erick Gordillo	400 m medley	4:22.96	21	—		did not advance	

Women

Athlete	Event	Heat		Semifinal		Final	
Athlete	Event	Time	Rank	Time	Rank	Time	Rank
Lucero Mejía	200 m freestyle	2:06.78	30	did not advance			
Lucero Mejía	100 m butterfly	1:04.98	25	did not advance			
