= Guatemala at the 2019 World Aquatics Championships =

- Flag of Guatemala
- FINA code: GUA
- National federation: National Federation of Swimming, Diving, Water Polo and Synchronized Swimming of Guatemala
- Website: fenadegua.com.gt (in Spanish)

in Gwangju, South Korea
- Competitors: 6 in 2 sports
- Medals: Gold 0 Silver 0 Bronze 0 Total 0

World Aquatics Championships appearances
- 1973; 1975; 1978; 1982; 1986; 1991; 1994; 1998; 2001; 2003; 2005; 2007; 2009; 2011; 2013; 2015; 2017; 2019; 2022; 2023; 2024

Guatemala competed at the 2019 World Aquatics Championships in Gwangju, South Korea from 12 to 28 July.

== Open water swimming ==
Guatemala qualified one male and one female open water swimmers.

Men

| Athlete | Event | Time | Rank |
|---|---|---|---|
| Santiago Reyes | Men's 5 km | 1:01:51.7 | 57 |
| Santiago Reyes | Men's 10 km | 2:08:27.5 | 69 |

Women

| Athlete | Event | Time | Rank |
|---|---|---|---|
| Yanci Vanegas | Women's 5 km | 1:06:24.4 | 50 |
| Yanci Vanegas | Women's 10 km | 2:11:59.1 | 56 |

== Swimming ==
Guatemala entered four swimmers.

Men

| Athlete | Event | Heat | | Semifinal | | Final | |
| Athlete | Event | Time | Rank | Time | Rank | Time | Rank |
|---|---|---|---|---|---|---|---|
| Erick Gordillo | 200 m backstroke | 2:05.53 | 38 | did not advance | | | |
| Erick Gordillo | 400 m individual medley | 4:28.57 | 29 | — | | did not advance | |
| Fernando Ponce | 100 m butterfly | 58.26 | 66 | did not advance | | | |
| Fernando Ponce | 200 m butterfly | 2:07.61 | 45 | did not advance | | | |

Women

| Athlete | Event | Heat | | Semifinal | | Final | |
| Athlete | Event | Time | Rank | Time | Rank | Time | Rank |
|---|---|---|---|---|---|---|---|
| Daila Ismatul | 50 m freestyle | 28.31 | 65 | did not advance | | | |
| Daila Ismatul | 400 m freestyle | 4:34.75 | 37 | — | | did not advance | |
| Gabriela Santis | 100 m freestyle | 58.93 | 50 | did not advance | | | |
| Gabriela Santis | 200 m freestyle | 2:05.36 | 36 | did not advance | | | |
