= Guatemala at the 2023 World Aquatics Championships =

- Flag of Guatemala
- FINA code: GUA
- National federation: National Federation of Swimming, Diving, Water Polo and Synchronized Swimming of Guatemala
- Website: fenadegua.com.gt (in Spanish)

in Fukuoka, Japan
- Competitors: 5 in 2 sports
- Medals: Gold 0 Silver 0 Bronze 0 Total 0

World Aquatics Championships appearances
- 1973; 1975; 1978; 1982; 1986; 1991; 1994; 1998; 2001; 2003; 2005; 2007; 2009; 2011; 2013; 2015; 2017; 2019; 2022; 2023; 2024

Guatemala competed at the 2023 World Aquatics Championships in Fukuoka, Japan from 14 to 30 July.

== Open water swimming ==
Guatemala entered 3 open water swimmers.

Men

Athlete	Event	Time	Rank
Fernando Ponce	Men's 5 km	1:06:23.0	62
Fernando Ponce	Men's 10 km	2:18:54.5	65
Santiago Reyes	Men's 5 km	1:05:42.9	59
Santiago Reyes	Men's 10 km	2:12:45.3	63

Women

Athlete	Event	Time	Rank
María Porres	Women's 5 km	1:11:37.8	53
María Porres	Women's 10 km	2:21:58.3	52

== Swimming ==
Guatemala entered 2 swimmers.

Men

Athlete	Event	Heat		Semifinal		Final	
Athlete	Event	Time	Rank	Time	Rank	Time	Rank
Erik Gordillo	200 metre butterfly	1:59.96	26	Did not advance			
Erik Gordillo	200 metre individual medley	2:02.64	27	Did not advance			
Erik Gordillo	400 metre individual medley	4:20.17	15	—		Did not advance	

Women

Athlete	Event	Heat		Semifinal		Final	
Athlete	Event	Time	Rank	Time	Rank	Time	Rank
Lucero Mejia	200 metre freestyle	2:06.24	46	Did not advance			
Lucero Mejia	400 metre individual medley	5:03.52	30	—		Did not advance	
