= Mayuko Goto =

Japanese swimmer

Personal information
- Nationality: Japanese
- Born: 13 July 1995 (age 30)

Sport
- Sport: Swimming
- Strokes: freestyle

Mayuko Goto (born 13 July 1995) is a Japanese freestyle swimmer. She competed in the women's 400 metre freestyle event at the 2018 FINA World Swimming Championships (25 m), in Hangzhou, China.
