= Leah Smith (swimmer) =

American swimmer (born 1995)

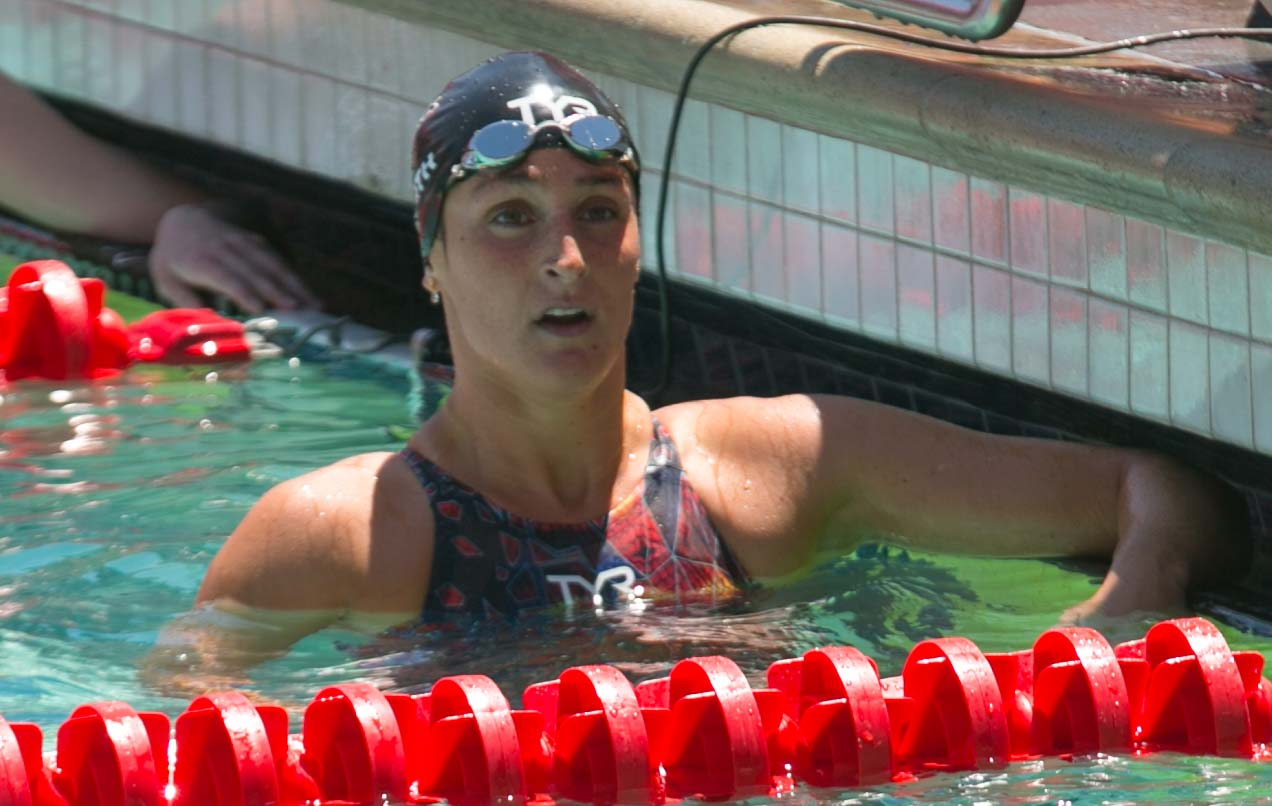
- Smith in 2018

Personal information
- Full name: Leah Grace Smith
- National team: United States
- Born: April 19, 1995 (age 31) Pittsburgh, Pennsylvania, U.S.
- Height: 5 ft 10 in (178 cm)
- Weight: 148 lb (67 kg)

Sport
- Sport: Swimming
- Strokes: Freestyle
- College team: University of Virginia
Medal record
Women's swimming
Representing the United States
Olympic Games
Gold medal – first place	2016 Rio de Janeiro	4×200 m freestyle
Bronze medal – third place	2016 Rio de Janeiro	400 m freestyle
World Championships (LC)
Gold medal – first place	2015 Kazan	4×200 m freestyle
Gold medal – first place	2017 Budapest	4×200 m freestyle
Gold medal – first place	2022 Budapest	4×200 m freestyle
Silver medal – second place	2017 Budapest	400 m freestyle
Silver medal – second place	2019 Gwangju	4×200 m freestyle
Silver medal – second place	2023 Fukuoka	4×200 m freestyle
Bronze medal – third place	2017 Budapest	800 m freestyle
Bronze medal – third place	2019 Gwangju	400 m freestyle
Bronze medal – third place	2022 Budapest	400 m freestyle
World Championships (SC)
Gold medal – first place	2016 Windsor	400 m freestyle
Gold medal – first place	2016 Windsor	800 m freestyle
Silver medal – second place	2016 Windsor	4×200 m freestyle
Silver medal – second place	2018 Hangzhou	4×200 m freestyle
Bronze medal – third place	2018 Hangzhou	800 m freestyle
Bronze medal – third place	2022 Melbourne	400 m freestyle
Bronze medal – third place	2022 Melbourne	4×200 m freestyle
Pan Pacific Championships
Gold medal – first place	2014 Gold Coast	4×200 m freestyle
Silver medal – second place	2018 Tokyo	4×200 m freestyle
Bronze medal – third place	2018 Tokyo	400 m freestyle
Bronze medal – third place	2018 Tokyo	800 m freestyle
Bronze medal – third place	2018 Tokyo	1500 m freestyle
Summer Universiade
Gold medal – first place	2015 Gwangju	400 m freestyle
Gold medal – first place	2015 Gwangju	4×200 m freestyle
Junior Pan Pacific Championships
Gold medal – first place	2012 Honolulu	400 m freestyle
Gold medal – first place	2012 Honolulu	800 m freestyle
Gold medal – first place	2012 Honolulu	4×200 m freestyle
Bronze medal – third place	2012 Honolulu	200 m freestyle

Leah Grace Smith (born April 19, 1995) is an American competition swimmer who specializes in freestyle events. Smith is a member of the 2016 US Women's Olympic Swimming team, and won a bronze medal in the 400 m freestyle and a gold medal in the 4 × 200 m relay at those games.

== Personal life ==
Smith was born in Pittsburgh to a family of many elite athletes. She is a great-granddaughter of World Series champion baseball player Jimmy Smith and great-niece of boxer Billy Conn. Her sister Aileen currently swims for Columbia University.

Smith was a club swimmer at the Jewish Community Center Sailfish and a graduate of Oakland Catholic High School. At one time she held pool records at the University of Pittsburgh Trees Pool for JCC Sailfish in one event and Oakland Catholic in another event. Smith committed to swim for the University of Virginia in 2013. She earned her B.A. degree in May 2017.

== Career ==
=== College career ===
Smith attended the University of Virginia, where she competed for the Virginia Cavaliers swimming and diving team. At the 2015 NCAA Championships, she won both the 500-yard freestyle and the 1,650-yard freestyle. Smith repeated as NCAA Champion in both the 500-yard freestyle and the 1650-yard freestyle at the 2016 NCAA Championships. Smith was awarded the IMP Award as the top female athlete at the University of Virginia at UVa's Annual Awards Dinner.

=== 2014 ===
At the 2014 Pan Pacific Swimming Championships, Smith won a gold medal and set a championship record as a member of the 4 × 200 m freestyle relay. She was also 9th in both the 400 m freestyle & 800 m freestyle. She then went on to win both the 400 m freestyle and the 4 × 200 m freestyle at the 2015 Summer Universiade (World University Games).

=== 2015 ===
Smith represented the United States at the 2015 World Aquatics Championships where she won a gold medal in the 4 × 200 m freestyle relay. She placed second in the 400 m freestyle event and the 800 m freestyle events at the 2016 Olympic Trials. With only 26 spots on the Women's Olympic Swimming Team, second place athletes are not guaranteed to qualify unless and until someone qualifies for more than one event. But in the United States "there has never been an occasion where the top two swimmers in each event, along with the top six swimmers in the 100 m and 200 m free, haven’t made the team", with the recent exception of Ryan Held, who finished sixth in the 100 m free at the 2020 Olympic Trials but was not selected to represent the US in Tokyo due to the 12-spot limit for relay-only swimmers, with Held being designated the 13th relay-only swimmer of priority. On July 3, 2016, Smith was named to the US Olympic Team.

=== 2016 ===
At the 2016 United States Olympic Trials, the U.S. qualifying meet for the Rio Olympics, Smith qualified for the U.S. Olympic team for the first time by finishing second in both the 400- and 800-meter freestyle events behind Katie Ledecky and third in the 200-meter freestyle.

In 2016, Smith competed at the Rio Olympic Games. She won a bronze medal in the 400-meter freestyle with a 4:01.92, behind Jazmin Carlin and Ledecky. Along with Ledecky, Maya DiRado, and Allison Schmitt, Smith won her first ever Olympic gold medal in the 4x200-meter freestyle relay. She had split 1:56.69 en route to a first-place finish in 7:43.03.

== Personal bests ==
Long Course

Event	Time	Meet	Location	Date	Notes
200 m freestyle	1:55.97	2017 World Championships	Budapest, Hungary	July 27, 2017	(r)
400 m freestyle	4:00.65	2016 US Olympics Trials	Omaha, Nebraska	June 27, 2016	
800 m freestyle	8:16.33	2019 TYR Pro Swim Series			
1500 m freestyle	16:00.82	2018 Pan Pacific Swimming Championships	Tokyo, Japan	August 12, 2018	
400 m Individual Medley	4:33.86	2017 US Nationals	Indianapolis, Indiana	June 29, 2017	
