= Beatriz Dizotti =

Brazilian swimmer (born 2000)

Personal information
- Full name: Beatriz Pimentel Dizotti
- Nickname: Bia
- Born: 13 April 2000 (age 26) São Paulo, Brazil
- Height: 1.66 m (5 ft 5 in)
- Weight: 59 kg (130 lb)

Sport
- Sport: Swimming
Medal record
Women's swimming
Representing Brazil
South American Games
Gold medal – first place	2018 Cochabamba	200 m butterfly
Silver medal – second place	2022 Asunción	1500 m freestyle
Bronze medal – third place	2018 Cochabamba	800 m freestyle
U.S. Open Championships
Silver medal – second place	2022 Greensboro	1500 m freestyle

Beatriz Pimentel Dizotti (born 13 April 2000) is a Brazilian swimmer. She represented Brazil at the 2020 Summer Olympics and finished 6th in the 1500m freestyle at the 2022 World Championships.

== Career ==
She competed in the women's 1500 metre freestyle event during the 2020 Summer Olympics, which was the first Olympic Games where women were allowed to compete in the 1500 metre freestyle.

At the 2022 World Aquatics Championships, in Budapest, Hungary, in the Women's 1500 metre freestyle event, she finished sixth with a time of 16:05.25, a new Brazilian record, and the best position ever obtained by a Brazilian in the event.

On 29 October 2022, Dizotti won the silver medal in the short course 1500 metre freestyle at the 2022 FINA Swimming World Cup in Toronto, Canada, finishing in a Brazilian record and personal best time of 15:48.82. One day earlier, she placed tenth in the 400 metre freestyle with a 4:13.89 and ninth in the 200 metre butterfly with a 2:17.11, both in approximately one hour. The following month, on 30 November, she placed fourth in the 800 metre freestyle at the 2022 U.S. Open Swimming Championships, held in Greensboro, United States, with a time of 8:40.10. The next day she finished third in a time of 4:18.24 in the b-final of the 400 metre freestyle. On the fourth and final day, she won the silver medal in the 1500 metre freestyle with a time of 16:18.40.

At the 2023 World Aquatics Championships, in Fukuoka, Japan, she remained among the best in the world, finishing 7th in the Women's 1500 metre freestyle, breaking the Brazilian record at heats, with a time of 16:01.95. She also finished 13th in the Women's 800 metre freestyle.
