= Delfina Dini =

Argentine swimmer (born 2001)

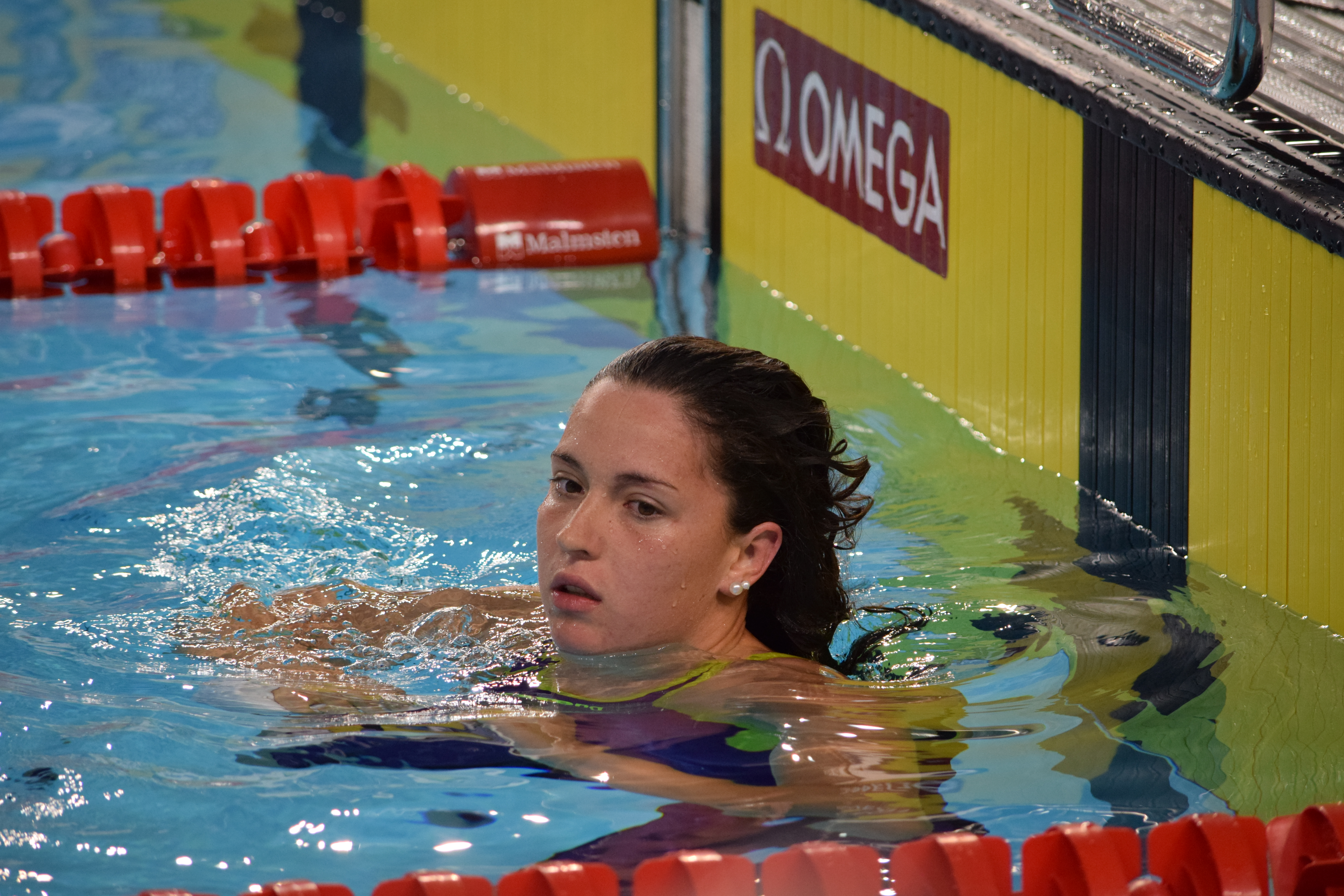

Personal information
- Full name: Delfina Veronica Dini
- Nationality: Argentine
- Born: 7 October 2001 (age 24)

Sport
- Sport: Swimming
Medal record
Representing Argentina
South American Games
Silver medal – second place	2022 Asuncion	4x200m freestyle relay

Delfina Veronica Dini (born 7 October 2001) is an Argentine swimmer. She competed in the women's 400 metre freestyle event at the 2018 FINA World Swimming Championships (25 m), in Hangzhou, China.
