= Gabriela Santis =

Guatemalan swimmer (born 1996)

Personal information
- National team: Guatemala
- Born: 4 November 1996 (age 29)

Sport
- Sport: Swimming
- College team: Delta State University

Gabriela Santis (born 4 November 1996) is a Guatemalan swimmer. She competed in the women's 200 metre freestyle event at the 2017 World Aquatics Championships.

In 2019, she represented Guatemala at the 2019 World Aquatics Championships held in Gwangju, South Korea. She competed in the women's 100 metre freestyle and women's 200 metre freestyle events. In both events she did not advance to compete in the semi-finals.
