= Simona Quadarella =

Italian swimmer (born 1998)

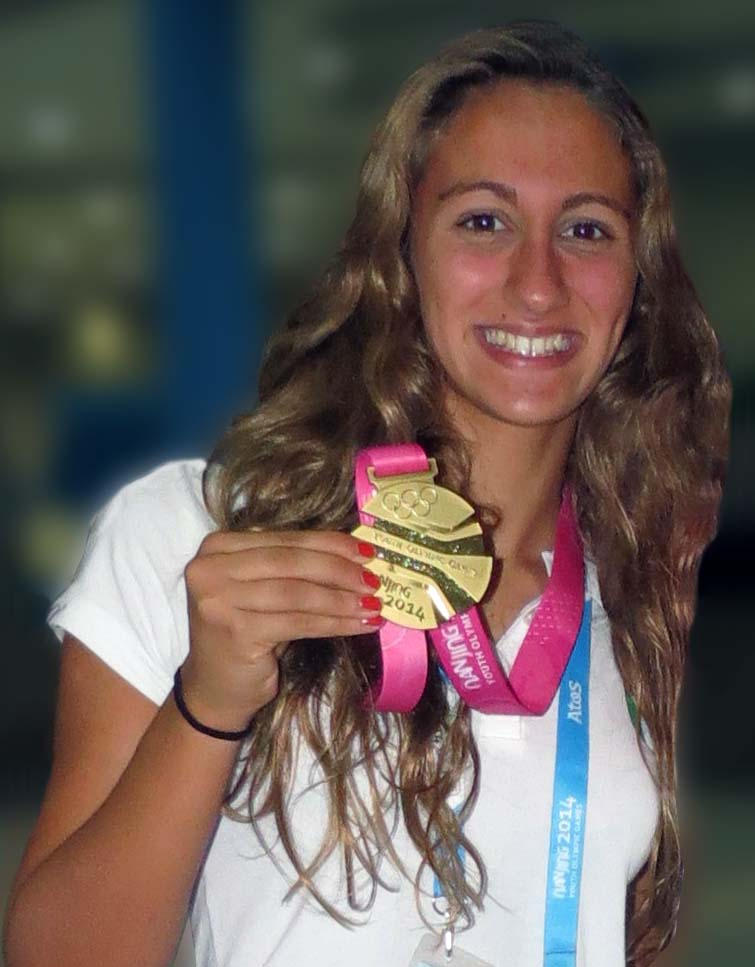
- Quadarella with her gold medal won at the 2014 Summer Youth Olympics.

Personal information
- National team: Italy
- Born: 18 December 1998 (age 27) Rome, Italy
- Height: 1.72 m (5 ft 8 in)
- Weight: 63 kg (139 lb)

Sport
- Sport: Swimming
- Strokes: Freestyle
- Club: Fiamme Rosse; Circolo Canottieri Aniene
- Coach: Christian Minotti
Medal record
Women's swimming
Representing Italy
Event	1st	2nd	3rd
Olympic Games	0	0	1
World Championships (LC)	3	3	2
World Championships (SC)	0	2	1
European Championships (LC)	11	1	1
European Championships (SC)	2	2	1
Universiade	2	0	1
Mediterranean Games	2	0	0
Total	20	8	7
Olympic Games
Bronze medal – third place	2020 Tokyo	800 m freestyle
World Championships (LC)
Gold medal – first place	2019 Gwangju	1500 m freestyle
Gold medal – first place	2024 Doha	800 m freestyle
Gold medal – first place	2024 Doha	1500 m freestyle
Silver medal – second place	2019 Gwangju	800 m freestyle
Silver medal – second place	2023 Fukuoka	1500 m freestyle
Silver medal – second place	2025 Singapore	1500 m freestyle
Bronze medal – third place	2017 Budapest	1500 m freestyle
Bronze medal – third place	2022 Budapest	800 m freestyle
World Championships (SC)
Silver medal – second place	2018 Hangzhou	800 m freestyle
Silver medal – second place	2024 Budapest	1500 m freestyle
Bronze medal – third place	2021 Abu Dhabi	800 m freestyle
European Championships (LC)
Gold medal – first place	2018 Glasgow	400 m freestyle
Gold medal – first place	2018 Glasgow	800 m freestyle
Gold medal – first place	2018 Glasgow	1500 m freestyle
Gold medal – first place	2020 Budapest	400 m freestyle
Gold medal – first place	2020 Budapest	800 m freestyle
Gold medal – first place	2020 Budapest	1500 m freestyle
Gold medal – first place	2022 Rome	800 m freestyle
Gold medal – first place	2022 Rome	1500 m freestyle
Gold medal – first place	2026 Paris	400 m freestyle
Gold medal – first place	2026 Paris	800 m freestyle
Gold medal – first place	2026 Paris	1500 m freestyle
Silver medal – second place	2022 Rome	400 m freestyle
Bronze medal – third place	2020 Budapest	4×200 m freestyle
European Championships (SC)
Gold medal – first place	2019 Glasgow	400 m freestyle
Gold medal – first place	2019 Glasgow	800 m freestyle
Gold medal – first place	2025 Lublin	1500 m freestyle
Silver medal – second place	2021 Kazan	800 m freestyle
Silver medal – second place	2021 Kazan	1500 m freestyle
Silver medal – second place	2025 Lublin	400 m freestyle
Silver medal – second place	2025 Lublin	800 m freestyle
Bronze medal – third place	2017 Copenhagen	800 m freestyle

Simona Quadarella (Italian pronunciation: [siˈmoːna kwadaˈrɛlla]; born 18 December 1998) is an Italian swimmer. She specializes in long distance freestyle events. At the 2020 Summer Olympics, she won a bronze medal in Women's 800 metre freestyle, and at the 2019 World Championships in Gwangju, won the gold medal in the 1500 m freestyle, and the silver medal in the 800 m freestyle.

== Career ==
Quadarella competed in the women's 1500 metre freestyle event at the 2017 World Aquatics Championships, winning the bronze medal. After her international explosion, which took place in 2017 at the age of 19, Simona Quadarella won 9 international medals in the two-year period 2017-2018 (7 gold and 2 bronze), including a trio of gold medals at the 2018 European Aquatics Championships in 400 m, 800 m and 1500 m freestyle. Than in July 2019, Quadarella won her first world title at the World Championships in Gwangju, taking gold in the 1500 m in a time of 15:40.89. She also won a silver medal in the 800 m race in a time of 8:14.99.

At the European Championships in Budapest 2020, held in May 2021 due to the COVID-19 pandemic, Quadarella won three gold medals (400 m, 800 m, 1500 m freestyle - the same feat achieved three years earlier in Glasgow 2018) and a bronze medal in the 4x200m freestyle. In July 2021, at the 2020 Summer Olympics, which were also postponed to 2021 due to the pandemic, she won the bronze medal in the 800 metre freestyle with a time of 8:18.35.

For the 1500 metre freestyle at the 2022 World Aquatics Championships, Quadarella placed fifth with a time of 16:03.84, finishing over 14 seconds behind bronze medalist Lani Pallister of Australia. She followed her performance up with a bronze medal-winning time of 8:19.00 in the 800 metre freestyle four days later.

=== 2022 European Championships ===
At the 2022 European Aquatics Championships, held two months later in Rome, Quadarella won the gold medal in the 800 metre freestyle with a time of 8:20.54. The title was her third-consecutive in the 800 metre freestyle at LEN European Aquatics Championships and was the first time a female swimmer achieved the title in the event three times in a row. Three days later, she won the gold medal in the 1500 metre freestyle with a time of 15:54.15. The win marked her third-consecutive gold medal in the event at LEN European Aquatics Championships. Her medal also brought her total number of gold medals won at LEN European Aquatics Championships to eight, setting a new record for the most gold medals won by a female Italian swimmer over the course of their career at the Championships. The final day, she won the silver medal in the 400 metre freestyle, finishing behind gold medalist Isabel Marie Gose of Germany with a time of 4:04.77.

== European records ==
- 800 m freestyle: 8:12.81 Singapore, 02 August 2025 - current holder
- 1500 m freestyle: 15:31.79 Singapore, 29 July 2025 - current holder

== International medals ==
Individual

Year	Championships	400 fs	800 fs	1500 fs
2017	World Championships (LC)			3rd place, bronze medalist(s)
2017	Universiade		1st place, gold medalist(s)	1st place, gold medalist(s)
2017	European Championships (SC)		3rd place, bronze medalist(s)	
2018	Mediterranean Games	1st place, gold medalist(s)	1st place, gold medalist(s)	
2018	European Championships (LC)	1st place, gold medalist(s)	1st place, gold medalist(s)	1st place, gold medalist(s)
2018	World Championships (SC)		2nd place, silver medalist(s)	
2019	World Championships (LC)		2nd place, silver medalist(s)	1st place, gold medalist(s)
2019	European Championships (SC)	1st place, gold medalist(s)	1st place, gold medalist(s)	
2021	European Championships (LC)	1st place, gold medalist(s)	1st place, gold medalist(s)	1st place, gold medalist(s)
2021	Olympic Games		3rd place, bronze medalist(s)	
2021	European Championships (SC)		2nd place, silver medalist(s)	2nd place, silver medalist(s)
2022	World Championships (LC)		3rd place, bronze medalist(s)	
2022	European Championships (LC)	2nd place, silver medalist(s)	1st place, gold medalist(s)	1st place, gold medalist(s)
2023	World Championships (LC)			2nd place, silver medalist(s)
2023	European Championships (SC)	1st place, gold medalist(s)	2nd place, silver medalist(s)	2nd place, silver medalist(s)
2024	World Championships (LC)		1st place, gold medalist(s)	1st place, gold medalist(s)

== See also ==
- Italy national swimming team – Women multiple medalists
- List of Italian records in swimming
