= List of European Championships records in swimming =

The European Championships records in swimming are the fastest times ever swum in European Swimming Championships' events.

== Long course (50 m) ==
Championship records at the European Aquatics Championships since 1926.

=== Men ===
Event	Time		Name	Nationality	Date	Meet	Location	Ref
50m freestyle	21.11	sf	Ben Proud	Great Britain	8 August 2018	2018 Championships	Glasgow, Great Britain	
100m freestyle	46.56		David Popovici	Romania	12 August 2026	2026 Championships	Paris, France	
200m freestyle	1:42.97		David Popovici	Romania	15 August 2022	2022 Championships	Rome, Italy	
400m freestyle	3:42.50		Lukas Märtens	Germany	17 August 2022	2022 Championships	Rome, Italy	
800m freestyle	7:37.59	ER	Johannes Liebmann	Germany	12 August 2026	2026 Championships	Paris, France	
1500m freestyle	14:26.79	WR	Johannes Liebmann	Germany	15 August 2026	2026 Championships	Paris, France	
50m backstroke	23.80		Kliment Kolesnikov	Russia	17 May 2021	2020 Championships	Budapest, Hungary	
100m backstroke	52.11		Camille Lacourt	France	10 Aug 2010	2010 Championships	Budapest, Hungary	
200m backstroke	1:52.30	sf, ER	Hubert Kós	Hungary	11 August 2026	2026 Championships	Paris, France	
50m breaststroke	26.09		Adam Peaty	Great Britain	8 August 2018	2018 Championships	Glasgow, Great Britain	
100m breaststroke	57.10		Adam Peaty	Great Britain	4 August 2018	2018 Championships	Glasgow, Great Britain	
200m breaststroke	2:06.80		Anton Chupkov	Russia	6 August 2018	2018 Championships	Glasgow, Great Britain	
50m butterfly	22.36	sf	Egor Kornev	Neutral Athletes B	10 August 2026	2026 Championships	Paris, France	
100m butterfly	49.48	ER	Kristóf Milák	Hungary	13 August 2026	2026 Championships	Paris, France	
200m butterfly	1:51.10		Kristóf Milák	Hungary	19 May 2021	2020 Championships	Budapest, Hungary	
200m individual medley	1:54.24		Hubert Kós	Hungary	16 August 2026	2026 Championships	Paris, France	
400m individual medley	4:08.17		Ilya Borodin	Neutral Athletes B	10 August 2026	2026 Championships	Paris, France	
4×100m freestyle relay	3:10.03		Hubert Kós (48.18); Szebasztián Szabó (48.29); Nándor Németh (47.27); Kristóf Milák (46.29)	Hungary	13 August 2026	2026 Championships	Paris, France	
4×200m freestyle relay	7:01.52		Matthew Richards (1:45.44); Jack McMillan (1:46.62); James Guy (1:44.07); Duncan Scott (1:45.39)	Great Britain	10 August 2026	2026 Championships	Paris, France	
4×100m medley relay	3:28.46		Thomas Ceccon (52.82); Nicolò Martinenghi (57.72); Matteo Rivolta (50.75); Alessandro Miressi (47.17)	Italy	17 August 2022	2022 Championships	Rome, Italy	

Legend: # – Record awaiting ratification by LEN; WR – World record; ER – European record;
Records not set in finals: h – heat; sf – semifinal; r – relay 1st leg; rh – relay heat 1st leg; so – swim-off

=== Women ===
Event	Time		Name	Nationality	Date	Meet	Location	Ref
50m freestyle	23.74		Sarah Sjöström	Sweden	4 August 2018	2018 Championships	Glasgow, Great Britain	
100m freestyle	51.90		Marrit Steenbergen	Netherlands	11 August 2026	2026 Championships	Paris, France	
200m freestyle	1:54.38		Barbora Seemanová	Czech Republic	13 August 2026	2026 Championships	Paris, France	
400m freestyle	4:01.34		Simona Quadarella	Italy	16 August 2026	2026 Championships	Paris, France	
800m freestyle	8:15.54		Jazmin Carlin	Great Britain	21 August 2014	2014 Championships	Berlin, Germany	
1500m freestyle	15:46.22		Simona Quadarella	Italy	14 August 2026	2026 Championships	Paris, France	
50m backstroke	26.56	WR	Sara Curtis	Italy	13 August 2026	2026 Championships	Paris, France	
100m backstroke	57.94	ER	Mary-Ambre Moluh	France	15 August 2026	2026 Championships	Paris, France	
200m backstroke	2:06.08		Margherita Panziera	Italy	23 May 2021	2020 Championships	Budapest, Hungary	
50m breaststroke	29.30	sf	Benedetta Pilato	Italy	22 May 2021	2020 Championships	Budapest, Hungary	
100m breaststroke	1:04.87		Angharad Evans	Great Britain	12 August 2026	2026 Championships	Paris, France	
200m breaststroke	2:19.32		Evgeniia Chikunova	Neutral Athletes B	14 August 2026	2026 Championships	Paris, France	
50m butterfly	24.87	sf	Sarah Sjöström	Sweden	18 August 2014	2014 Championships	Berlin, Germany	
100m butterfly	55.89	=	Sarah Sjöström	Sweden	20 May 2016	2016 Championships	London, Great Britain	
100m butterfly	55.89	=, sf	Roos Vanotterdijk	Belgium	13 August 2026	2026 Championships	Paris, France	
200m butterfly	2:04.79		Mireia Belmonte Garcia	Spain	24 August 2014	2014 Championships	Berlin, Germany	
200m individual medley	2:07.30		Katinka Hosszú	Hungary	19 May 2016	2016 Championships	London, Great Britain	
400m individual medley	4:30.90		Katinka Hosszú	Hungary	16 May 2016	2016 Championships	London, Great Britain	
4×100m freestyle relay	3:31.89		Milou van Wijk (53.40); Imani de Jong (53.47); Yara van Kalmthout (53.68); Marrit Steenbergen (51.34)	Netherlands	12 August 2026	2026 Championships	Paris, France	
4×200m freestyle relay	7:45.93		Freya Colbert (1:55.65); Abbie Wood (1:56.72); Leah Schlosshan (1:56.80); Freya Anderson (1:56.76)	Great Britain	10 August 2026	2026 Championships	Paris, France	
4×100m medley relay	3:53.50		Lauren Cox (59.67); Angharad Evans (1:03.75); Keanna Macinnes (56.81); Freya Colbert (53.27)	Great Britain	16 August 2026	2026 Championships	Paris, France	

Legend: # – Record awaiting ratification by LEN; WR – World record; ER – European record;
Records not set in finals: h – heat; sf – semifinal; r – relay 1st leg; rh – relay heat 1st leg; so – swim-off

=== Mixed relay ===
Event	Time		Name	Nationality	Date	Meet	Location	Ref
4×100m freestyle relay	3:19.95		Egor Kornev (47.05); Ivan Girev (47.67); Daria Klepikova (52.21); Kira Manokhina (53.02)	Neutral Athletes B	14 August 2026	2026 Championships	Paris, France	
4×200m freestyle relay	7:24.13		Jack McMillan (1:47.09); Matthew Richards (1:45.85); Freya Colbert (1:55.23); Freya Anderson (1:55.96)	Great Britain	15 August 2026	2026 Championships	Paris, France	
4×100m medley relay	3:38.82	ER	Kathleen Dawson (58.43); Adam Peaty (57.13); James Guy (50.61); Anna Hopkin (52.65)	Great Britain	20 May 2021	2020 Championships	Budapest, Hungary	

Legend: # – Record awaiting ratification by LEN; WR – World record; ER – European record;
Records not set in finals: h – heat; sf – semifinal; r – relay 1st leg; rh – relay heat 1st leg; so – swim-off

== Short course (25 m) ==
Championship records at the European Short Course (SC) Championships since 1991.

=== Men ===
Event	Time		Name	Nationality	Date	Meet	Location	Ref
50m freestyle	20.18	ER	Benjamin Proud	Great Britain	7 December 2023	2023 Championships	Otopeni, Romania	
100m freestyle	44.94	ER	Amaury Leveaux	France	13 December 2008	2008 Championships	Rijeka, Croatia	
200m freestyle	1:39.81		Paul Biedermann	Germany	13 Dec 2009	2009 Championships	Istanbul, Turkey	
400m freestyle	3:33.20		Danas Rapšys	Lithuania	4 December 2019	2019 Championships	Glasgow, Great Britain	
800m freestyle	7:20.46	WR	Daniel Wiffen	Ireland	10 December 2023	2023 Championships	Otopeni, Romania	
1500m freestyle	14:08.06		Gregorio Paltrinieri	Italy	4 December 2015	2015 Championships	Netanya, Israel	
50m backstroke	22.47		Kliment Kolesnikov	Russia	3 November 2021	2021 Championships	Kazan, Russia	
100m backstroke	48.97		Arkady Vyatchanin	Russia	13 Dec 2009	2009 Championships	Istanbul, Turkey	
100m backstroke	48.97		Stanislav Donets	Russia	13 Dec 2009	2009 Championships	Istanbul, Turkey	
200m backstroke	1:47.89		John Shortt	Ireland	3 December 2025	2025 Championships	Lublin, Poland	
50m breaststroke	25.25		Ilya Shymanovich	Belarus	7 November 2021	2021 Championships	Kazan, Russia	
100m breaststroke	55.45	sf	Ilya Shymanovich	Belarus	3 November 2021	2021 Championships	Kazan, Russia	
200m breaststroke	2:00.53		Marco Koch	Germany	3 December 2015	2015 Championships	Netanya, Israel	
50m butterfly	21.51	sf	Noè Ponti	Switzerland	2 December 2025	2025 Championships	Lublin, Poland	
100m butterfly	48.10		Maxime Grousset	France	5 December 2025	2025 Championships	Lublin, Poland	
200m butterfly	1:49.00		László Cseh	Hungary	6 December 2015	2015 Championships	Netanya, Israel	
100m individual medley	50.52		Noè Ponti	Switzerland	4 December 2025	2025 Championships	Lublin, Poland	
200m individual medley	1:50.85		Andreas Vazaios	Greece	6 December 2019	2019 Championships	Glasgow, Great Britain	
400m individual medley	3:57.01		Alberto Razzetti	Italy	10 December 2023	2023 Championships	Otopeni, Romania	
4×50m freestyle relay	1:20.77	ER	Alain Bernard (20.64); Fabien Gilot (20.33); Amaury Leveaux (19.93); Frédérick Bousquet (19.87)	France	14 Dec 2008	2008 Championships	Rijeka, Croatia	
4×50m medley relay	1:30.14	WR	Michele Lamberti (22.62); Nicolò Martinenghi (25.14); Marco Orsi (22.17); Lorenzo Zazzeri (20.21)	Italy	3 November 2021	2021 Championships	Kazan, Russia	

Legend: # – Record awaiting ratification by LEN; WR – World record; ER – European record;
Records not set in finals: h – heat; sf – semifinal; r – relay 1st leg; rh – relay heat 1st leg; so – swim-off

=== Women ===
Event	Time		Name	Nationality	Date	Meet	Location	Ref
50m freestyle	23.12		Sarah Sjöström	Sweden	3 November 2021	2021 Championships	Kazan, Russia	
100m freestyle	50.42	ER	Marrit Steenbergen	Netherlands	6 December 2025	2025 Championships	Lublin, Poland	
200m freestyle	1:50.33	ER	Marrit Steenbergen	Netherlands	4 December 2025	2025 Championships	Lublin, Poland	
400m freestyle	3:54.33	ER	Isabel Gose	Germany	2 December 2025	2025 Championships	Lublin, Poland	
800m freestyle	8:01.90		Isabel Gose	Germany	5 December 2025	2025 Championships	Lublin, Poland	
1500m freestyle	15:18.30		Anastasiya Kirpichnikova	Russia	5 November 2021	2021 Championships	Kazan, Russia	
50m backstroke	25.47	r, ER	Marrit Steenbergen	Netherlands	7 December 2025	2025 Championships	Lublin, Poland	
100m backstroke	55.17	sf	Kira Toussaint	Netherlands	4 December 2019	2019 Championships	Glasgow, Great Britain	
200m backstroke	1:59.84		Katinka Hosszú	Hungary	4 December 2015	2015 Championships	Netanya, Israel	
50m breaststroke	28.81		Eneli Jefimova	Estonia	7 December 2025	2025 Championships	Lublin, Poland	
100m breaststroke	1:02.82		Eneli Jefimova	Estonia	3 December 2025	2025 Championships	Lublin, Poland	
200m breaststroke	2:15.21	ER	Rikke Møller Pedersen	Denmark	13 December 2013	2013 Championships	Herning, Denmark	
200m breaststroke	2:14.39	X	Yulia Efimova	Russia	13 December 2013	2016 Championships	Herning, Denmark	
50m butterfly	24.50		Sarah Sjöström	Sweden	7 November 2021	2021 Championships	Kazan, Russia	
100m butterfly	55.00		Sarah Sjöström	Sweden	17 December 2017	2017 Championships	Copenhagen, Denmark	
200m butterfly	2:01.52		Mireia Belmonte	Spain	12 December 2013	2013 Championships	Herning, Denmark	
100m individual medley	56.26	ER	Marrit Steenbergen	Netherlands	4 December 2025	2025 Championships	Lublin, Poland	
200m individual medley	2:01.83	ER	Marrit Steenbergen	Netherlands	6 December 2025	2025 Championships	Lublin, Poland	
400m individual medley	4:19.46	h	Katinka Hosszú	Hungary	2 December 2015	2015 Championships	Netanya, Israel	
4×50m freestyle relay	1:33.25	ER	Inge Dekker (23.53); Hinkelien Schreuder (22.81); Saskia de Jonge (23.88); Ranomi Kromowidjojo (23.03)	Netherlands	11 December 2009	2009 Championships	Istanbul, Turkey	
4×50m medley relay	1:42.69	ER	Hinkelien Schreuder (26.32); Moniek Nijhuis (29.16); Inge Dekker (24.51); Ranomi Kromowidjojo (22.70)	Netherlands	12 December 2009	2009 Championships	Istanbul, Turkey	

Legend: # – Record awaiting ratification by LEN; WR – World record; ER – European record;
Records not set in finals: h – heat; sf – semifinal; r – relay 1st leg; rh – relay heat 1st leg; so – swim-off

=== Mixed relay ===
Event	Time		Name	Nationality	Date	Meet	Location	Ref
4×50m freestyle relay	1:27.26	WR	Leonardo Deplano (20.97); Lorenzo Zazzeri (20.51); Silvia Di Pietro (23.07); Sara Curtis (22.71)	Italy	4 December 2025	2025 Championships	Lublin, Poland	
4×50m medley relay	1:36.09		Francesco Lazzari (22.88); Simone Cerasuolo (25.67); Silvia Di Pietro (24.62); Sara Curtis (22.92)	Italy	3 December 2025	2025 Championships	Lublin, Poland	

Legend: # – Record awaiting ratification by FINA; WR – World record; ER – European record;
Records not set in finals: h – heat; † – en route to final mark; so – swim-off
