= Anna Egorova =

Russian swimmer

Personal information
- Full name: Anna Dmitrievna Egorova
- Nationality: Russian
- Born: 31 May 1998 (age 28) Kaliningrad, Russia

Sport
- Sport: Swimming
- Strokes: Freestyle
Medal record
Women's swimming
Representing Russia
European Championships (LC)
Silver medal – second place	2018 Glasgow	4×200 m freestyle
Silver medal – second place	2020 Budapest	400 m freestyle
Bronze medal – third place	2018 Glasgow	800 m freestyle
Bronze medal – third place	2020 Budapest	800 m freestyle
Bronze medal – third place	2020 Budapest	4×200 m mixed freestyle
European Championships (SC)
Silver medal – second place	2021 Kazan	400 m freestyle
Summer Universiade
Gold medal – first place	2017 Taipei	4×200 m freestyle
Military World Games
Silver medal – second place	2019 Wuhan	4×100 m freestyle
Bronze medal – third place	2019 Wuhan	400 m freestyle

Anna Dmitrievna Egorova (Russian: Анна Дмитриевна Егорова; born 31 May 1998) is a Russian swimmer. She competed in the women's 800 metre freestyle event at the 2018 European Aquatics Championships, winning the bronze medal.
