= Jimena Pérez =

Spanish swimmer (born 1997)

Personal information
- Full name: Jimena Pérez Blanco
- National team: Spain
- Born: 22 August 1997 (age 29) Santander, Spain

Sport
- Sport: Swimming
Medal record
Representing Spain
Youth Olympic Games
Silver medal – second place	2014 Nanjing	800 m freestyle
European Junior Championships
Gold medal – first place	2013 Poznań	1500 m freestyle

Jimena Pérez Blanco (born 22 August 1997) is a Spanish swimmer. She competed in the women's 1500 metre freestyle event at the 2017 World Aquatics Championships. In 2019, she represented Spain at the 2019 World Aquatics Championships held in Gwangju, South Korea. She competed in the women's 800 metre freestyle and women's 1500 metre freestyle events. In both events she did not advance to compete in the final. She also competed in the women's 400 metre individual medley event.
