= Isabel Gose =

German swimmer (born 2002)

Isabel Marie Gose
Personal information
- Nationality: German
- Born: 9 May 2002 (age 24) Berlin, Germany

Sport
- Sport: Swimming
- Strokes: Freestyle
- Club: SC Magdeburg
- Coach: Bernd Berkhahn
Medal record
Women's swimming
Representing Germany
Olympic Games
Bronze medal – third place	2024 Paris	1500 m freestyle
World Championships (LC)
Gold medal – first place	2025 Singapore	Team open water
Silver medal – second place	2024 Doha	800 m freestyle
Bronze medal – third place	2024 Doha	400 m freestyle
Bronze medal – third place	2024 Doha	1500 m freestyle
World Championships (SC)
Gold medal – first place	2024 Budapest	1500 m freestyle
Silver medal – second place	2024 Budapest	800 m freestyle
European Championships (LC)
Gold medal – first place	2022 Rome	400 m freestyle
Silver medal – second place	2022 Rome	800 m freestyle
Silver medal – second place	2026 Paris	800 m freestyle
Silver medal – second place	2026 Paris	1500 m freestyle
Silver medal – second place	2026 Paris	400 m freestyle
Bronze medal – third place	2018 Glasgow	4×200 m freestyle
Bronze medal – third place	2022 Rome	200 m freestyle
European Championships (open water)
Gold medal – first place	2026 Paris	3 km knockout sprints
Gold medal – first place	2026 Paris	Team open water
European Championships (SC)
Gold medal – first place	2025 Lublin	400 m freestyle
Gold medal – first place	2025 Lublin	800 m freestyle
Silver medal – second place	2019 Glasgow	400 m freestyle
Bronze medal – third place	2021 Kazan	400 m freestyle
Bronze medal – third place	2021 Kazan	800 m freestyle

Isabel Marie Gose (born 9 May 2002) is a German swimmer. She is 1500 metre freestyle World champion and 400 m freestyle European champion. She also won the bronze medal in the 1500 metre freestyle at the 2024 Paris Olympics.
