= Tiana Rabarijaona =

Malagasy swimmer

Personal information
- Born: 1 August 1998 (age 28)

Sport
- Sport: Swimming

Tiana Rabarijaona (born 1 August 1998) is a Malagasy swimmer. She represented Madagascar at the 2019 World Aquatics Championships held in Gwangju, South Korea. She competed in the women's 200 metre freestyle and women's 400 metre freestyle events. In the 200 metre event, she did not advance to compete in the semi-finals. In the 400 metre event, she did not advance to compete in the final. She also competed in two relay events, without winning a medal.

She competed in the women's 400 metre freestyle event at the 2020 Summer Olympics held in Tokyo, Japan.
