= Swimming at the 2014 European Aquatics Championships – Women's 100 metre freestyle =

Women's 100 metre freestyle at the Swimming at the 2014 European Aquatics Championships
- Dates: 19–20 August
- Competitors: 42 from 24 nations
- Winning time: 52.67

Medalists
| gold medal | Sarah Sjöström | Sweden |
| silver medal | Femke Heemskerk | Netherlands |
| bronze medal | Michelle Coleman | Sweden |

The Women's 100 metre freestyle competition of the 2014 European Aquatics Championships was held on 19–20 August.

== Records ==
Prior to the competition, the existing world, European and championship records were as follows.

| | Name | Nation | Time | Location | Date |
|---|---|---|---|---|---|
| World record | Britta Steffen | Germany | 52.07 | Rome | 31 July 2009 |
| European record | Britta Steffen | Germany | 52.07 | Rome | 31 July 2009 |
| Championship record | Britta Steffen | Germany | 53.30 | Budapest | 2 August 2006 |

== Results ==
=== Heats ===
The heats were held at 10:22.

| Rank | Heat | Lane | Name | Nationality | Time | Notes |
|---|---|---|---|---|---|---|
| 1 | 4 | 4 | Femke Heemskerk | Netherlands | 53.55 | Q |
| 2 | 5 | 4 | Sarah Sjöström | Sweden | 53.66 | Q |
| 3 | 3 | 4 | Michelle Coleman | Sweden | 54.05 | Q |
| 4 | 5 | 5 | Pernille Blume | Denmark | 54.28 | Q |
| 5 | 3 | 6 | Katinka Hosszú | Hungary | 54.45 | Q |
| 6 | 4 | 5 | Veronika Popova | Russia | 54.74 | Q |
| 7 | 3 | 5 | Charlotte Bonnet | France | 54.79 | Q |
| 8 | 4 | 6 | Maud van der Meer | Netherlands | 55.00 | Q |
| 9 | 5 | 3 | Louise Hansson | Sweden | 55.06 | |
| 10 | 3 | 0 | Nina Rangelova | Bulgaria | 55.07 | Q |
| 11 | 5 | 8 | Esmee Vermeulen | Netherlands | 55.18 | |
| 12 | 4 | 3 | Erika Ferraioli | Italy | 55.24 | Q |
| 13 | 3 | 2 | Margarita Nesterova | Russia | 55.31 | Q |
| 14 | 4 | 7 | Fatima Gallardo | Spain | 55.35 | Q |
| 15 | 5 | 1 | Hanna-Maria Seppälä | Finland | 55.49 | Q |
| 16 | 5 | 6 | Arina Openysheva | Russia | 55.52 | |
| 17 | 5 | 2 | Anna Santamans | France | 55.58 | Q |
| 18 | 3 | 7 | Giada Galizi | Italy | 55.62 | Q |
| 19 | 3 | 8 | Cecilie Johannessen | Norway | 55.68 | Q |
| 20 | 5 | 7 | Birgit Koschischek | Austria | 55.75 | |
| 21 | 3 | 1 | Julie Levisen | Denmark | 55.76 | |
| 22 | 5 | 0 | Darya Stepanyuk | Ukraine | 55.82 | |
| 23 | 4 | 1 | Rebecca Turner | Great Britain | 55.88 | |
| 24 | 4 | 2 | Alice Mizzau | Italy | 55.90 | |
| 25 | 3 | 3 | Mariya Baklakova | Russia | 56.10 | |
| 26 | 4 | 9 | Shauna Lee | Great Britain | 56.24 | |
| 27 | 4 | 0 | Ilse Kraaijeveld | Netherlands | 56.29 | |
| 28 | 4 | 8 | Cloe Hache | France | 56.64 | |
| 29 | 2 | 5 | Miroslava Najdanovski | Serbia | 56.89 | |
| 30 | 3 | 9 | Anna Kolárová | Czech Republic | 56.91 | |
| 31 | 2 | 1 | Keren Siebner | Israel | 56.95 | |
| 32 | 2 | 8 | Katarina Simonović | Serbia | 57.05 | |
| 33 | 2 | 4 | Magdalena Kuras | Sweden | 57.16 | |
| 34 | 2 | 6 | Tess Grossmann | Estonia | 57.24 | |
| 35 | 2 | 0 | Alina Vats | Ukraine | 57.28 | |
| 36 | 2 | 2 | Noemi Girardet | Switzerland | 57.37 | |
| 37 | 1 | 5 | Anja Klinar | Slovenia | 57.46 | |
| 38 | 1 | 3 | Julia Hassler | Liechtenstein | 57.68 | |
| 39 | 2 | 3 | Yuliya Khitraya | Belarus | 57.78 | |
| 40 | 2 | 9 | Katharina Egger | Austria | 58.55 | |
| 41 | 2 | 7 | Eva Gliožerytė | Lithuania | 58.70 | |
| 42 | 1 | 4 | Monika Vasilyan | Armenia | 1:00.47 | |
| — | 5 | 9 | Chiara Masini | Italy | | DNS |

=== Semifinals ===
The semifinals were held at 18:11.

==== Semifinal 1 ====
| Rank | Lane | Name | Nationality | Time | Notes |
|---|---|---|---|---|---|
| 1 | 5 | Pernille Blume | Denmark | 54.26 | Q |
| 2 | 4 | Sarah Sjöström | Sweden | 54.31 | Q |
| 3 | 3 | Veronika Popova | Russia | 54.58 | Q |
| 4 | 7 | Fatima Gallardo | Spain | 54.85 | Q |
| 5 | 6 | Maud van der Meer | Netherlands | 55.14 | |
| 6 | 2 | Erika Ferraioli | Italy | 55.29 | |
| 7 | 8 | Cecilie Johannessen | Norway | 55.51 | |
| 8 | 1 | Anna Santamans | France | 55.77 | |

==== Semifinal 2 ====
| Rank | Lane | Name | Nationality | Time | Notes |
|---|---|---|---|---|---|
| 1 | 4 | Femke Heemskerk | Netherlands | 53.66 | Q |
| 2 | 5 | Michelle Coleman | Sweden | 54.15 | Q |
| 3 | 3 | Katinka Hosszú | Hungary | 54.48 | |
| 4 | 6 | Charlotte Bonnet | France | 54.90 | Q |
| 5 | 2 | Nina Rangelova | Bulgaria | 55.13 | Q |
| 6 | 7 | Margarita Nesterova | Russia | 55.32 | |
| 7 | 8 | Giada Galizi | Italy | 55.60 | |
| 8 | 1 | Hanna-Maria Seppälä | Finland | 55.61 | |

=== Final ===
The final was held at 19:18.

| Rank | Lane | Name | Nationality | Time | Notes |
|---|---|---|---|---|---|
| 1st place, gold medalist(s) | 6 | Sarah Sjöström | Sweden | 52.67 | CR |
| 2nd place, silver medalist(s) | 4 | Femke Heemskerk | Netherlands | 53.64 | |
| 3rd place, bronze medalist(s) | 5 | Michelle Coleman | Sweden | 53.75 | |
| 4 | 3 | Pernille Blume | Denmark | 54.15 | |
| 5 | 2 | Veronika Popova | Russia | 54.34 | |
| 6 | 7 | Fatima Gallardo | Spain | 54.93 | |
| 7 | 1 | Charlotte Bonnet | France | 54.96 | |
| 8 | 8 | Nina Rangelova | Bulgaria | 55.46 | |
