= Swimming at the 2016 European Aquatics Championships – Women's 4 × 100 metre freestyle relay =

Swimming tournament

Women's 4 × 100 metre freestyle relay at the 2016 European Aquatics Championships
- Dates: 16 May
- Competitors: 63 from 15 nations
- Teams: 15
- Winning time: 3:33.80

Medalists
gold medal	Maud van der Meer; Femke Heemskerk; Marrit Steenbergen; Ranomi Kromowidjojo	Netherlands
silver medal	Silvia Di Pietro; Erika Ferraioli; Aglaia Pezzato; Federica Pellegrini	Italy
bronze medal	Sarah Sjöström; Ida Marko-Varga; Ida Lindborg; Louise Hansson	Sweden

The Women's 4 × 100 metre freestyle relay competition of the 2016 European Aquatics Championships was held on 16 May 2016.

== Records ==
Prior to the competition, the existing world, European and championship records were as follows.

	Nation	Time	Location	Date
World record	Australia	3:30.98	Glasgow	24 July 2014
European record	Netherlands	3:31.72	Rome	26 July 2009
Championship record	Netherlands	3:33.62	Eindhoven	18 March 2008

== Results ==
=== Heats ===
The heats were held at 11:56.

Rank	Heat	Lane	Nation	Swimmers	Time	Notes
1	1	1	Netherlands	Maud van der Meer (54.55); Marrit Steenbergen (54.49); Esmee Vermeulen (54.85); Femke Heemskerk (54.69)	3:38.58	Q
2	2	5	Italy	Erika Ferraioli (54.85); Aglaia Pezzato (54.91); Laura Letrati (55.27); Federica Pellegrini (54.18)	3:39.21	Q
3	2	6	Denmark	Mie Østergaard Nielsen (54.47); Julie Kepp Jensen (55.94); Sarah Bro (55.29); Pernille Blume (53.68)	3:39.38	Q
4	2	7	France	Mathilde Cini (55.18); Cloé Hache (54.95); Anna Santamans (55.17); Marie Wattel (55.96)	3:41.26	Q
5	2	2	Spain	Fatima Gallardo Carapeto (55.90); Marta Gonzalez Crivillers (54.96); Lidon Munoz Del Campo (55.92); Patricia Castro (54.79)	3:41.57	Q
6	1	6	Switzerland	Maria Ugolkova (55.52); Sasha Touretski (56.23); Danielle Carmen Villars (55.33); Noemi Girardet (55.02)	3:42.10	Q
7	2	4	Finland	Fanny Teijonsalo (56.39); Hanna-Maria Seppälä (55.83); Lotta Nevalainen (55.96); Mimosa Jallow (54.98)	3:43.16	Q
8	2	1	Sweden	Louise Hansson (56.10); Ida Marko-Varga (54.98); Ida Lindborg (55.57); Nathalie Lindborg (56.60)	3:43.25	Q
9	1	4	Great Britain	Harriet Cooper (55.45); Georgia Coates (56.30); Ellie Faulkner (56.40); Lucy Hope (55.52)	3:43.67	
10	2	3	Austria	Birgit Koschischek (55.58); Lisa Zaiser (56.12); Lena Kreundl (55.77); Julia Kukla (56.70)	3:44.17	
11	1	5	Belgium	Kimberly Buys (56.02); Juliette Dumont (56.39); Juliette Casini (56.15); Lotte Goris (55.66)	3:44.22	
12	1	7	Turkey	Ilknur Nihan Cakici (57.30); Esra Kuebra Kacmaz (56.56); Gizem Bozkurt (57.83); Ekaterina Avramova (57.14)	3:48.83	
13	1	2	Estonia	Kertu Ly Alnek (56.97); Tess Grossmann (57.34); Margaret Markvardt (58.13); Alina Kendzior (58.46)	3:50.90	
14	2	8	San Marino	Elisa Bernardi (1:00.60); Elena Giovannini (59.94); Martina Ceccaroni (59.92); Sara Lettoli (59.26)	3:59.72	
	1	3	Israel	Keren Siebner (56.04); Zohar Shikler (56.53); Amit Ivry; Andrea Murez	DSQ	

=== Final ===
The final was held at 19:18.

Rank	Lane	Nation	Swimmers	Time	Notes
1st place, gold medalist(s)	4	Netherlands	Maud van der Meer (54.68); Femke Heemskerk (52.80); Marrit Steenbergen (53.82); Ranomi Kromowidjojo (52.50)	3:33.80	
2nd place, silver medalist(s)	5	Italy	Silvia Di Pietro (55.00); Erika Ferraioli (54.18); Aglaia Pezzato (55.04); Federica Pellegrini (53.46)	3:37.68	
3rd place, bronze medalist(s)	8	Sweden	Sarah Sjöström (53.48); Ida Marko-Varga (54.90); Ida Lindborg (54.45); Louise Hansson (55.01)	3:37.84	
4	6	France	Mathilde Cini (54.82); Cloé Hache (55.08); Anna Santamans (54.66); Charlotte Bonnet (53.73)	3:38.29	
5	3	Denmark	Pernille Blume (54.26); Julie Kepp Jensen (55.87); Sarah Bro (55.53); Mie Østergaard Nielsen (53.91)	3:39.57	
6	2	Spain	Fatima Gallardo Carapeto (55.33); Marta Gonzalez Crivillers (54.52); Patricia Castro (54.92); Lidon Munoz Del Campo (55.87)	3:40.64	
7	7	Switzerland	Maria Ugolkova (55.07); Sasha Touretski (56.45); Danielle Carmen Villars (55.06); Noemi Girardet (55.18)	3:41.76	
8	1	Finland	Fanny Teijonsalo (56.64); Hanna-Maria Seppälä (55.91); Lotta Nevalainen (55.78); Mimosa Jallow (54.90)	3:43.23	
