= Swimming at the 2018 European Aquatics Championships – Women's 100 metre freestyle =

Women's 100 metre freestyle at the 2018 European Aquatics Championships
- Venue: Tollcross International Swimming Centre
- Dates: 7 August (heats and semifinals); 8 August (final)
- Competitors: 51 from 27 nations
- Winning time: 52.93

Medalists
gold medal	Sarah Sjöström	Sweden
silver medal	Femke Heemskerk	Netherlands
bronze medal	Charlotte Bonnet	France

The Women's 100 metre freestyle competition of the 2018 European Aquatics Championships was held on 7 and 8 August 2018.

== Records ==
Prior to the competition, the existing world and championship records were as follows.

	Name	Nation	Time	Location	Date
World record European record	Sarah Sjöström	Sweden	51.71	Budapest	23 July 2017
Championship record	Sarah Sjöström	Sweden	52.67	Berlin	20 August 2014

== Results ==
=== Heats ===
The heats were started on 7 August at 09:00.

Rank	Heat	Lane	Name	Nationality	Time	Notes
1	5	4	Pernille Blume	Denmark	52.97	Q
2	6	4	Sarah Sjöström	Sweden	53.45	Q
3	4	4	Charlotte Bonnet	France	53.90	Q
4	5	5	Femke Heemskerk	Netherlands	53.96	Q
5	6	7	Signe Bro	Denmark	54.08	Q
6	6	3	Freya Anderson	Great Britain	54.27	Q
7	6	2	Maria Kameneva	Russia	54.46	Q
8	5	3	Federica Pellegrini	Italy	54.51	Q
9	4	5	Marie Wattel	France	54.59	Q
10	4	6	Anika Apostalon	Czech Republic	54.61	Q
11	5	7	Arina Openysheva	Russia	54.70	Q
12	4	8	Katarzyna Wasick	Poland	54.71	Q
13	5	6	Andrea Murez	Israel	54.82	Q
14	4	1	Nina Kost	Switzerland	55.08	Q
15	5	2	Lidón Muñoz	Spain	55.14	Q
16	4	7	Anna Hopkin	Great Britain	55.17	Q
17	6	1	Erika Ferraioli	Italy	55.24	
18	4	2	Béryl Gastaldello	France	55.29	
19	5	8	Julie Kepp Jensen	Denmark	55.36	
20	6	8	Rozaliya Nasretdinova	Russia	55.43	
21	4	3	Kim Busch	Netherlands	55.45	
22	6	0	Neža Klančar	Slovenia	55.58	
23	6	9	Giada Galizi	Italy	55.62	
24	3	4	Theodora Drakou	Greece	55.78	
25	5	1	Louise Hansson	Sweden	55.81	
26	5	0	Anna Kolářová	Czech Republic	55.87	
27	2	5	Noemi Girardet	Switzerland	56.04	
28	3	1	Emily Gantriis	Denmark	56.09	
29	3	0	Iryna Pikiner	Ukraine	56.27	
30	5	9	Laura Letrari	Italy	56.29	
31	3	3	Janja Šegel	Slovenia	56.34	
32	3	7	Ieva Maļuka	Latvia	56.49	
33	3	6	Selen Özbilen	Turkey	56.53	
34	2	8	Ekaterina Avramova	Turkey	56.64	
35	3	5	Susann Bjørnsen	Norway	56.97	
36	2	6	Magdalena Kuras	Sweden	57.10	
37	3	9	Kalia Antoniou	Cyprus	57.12	
38	2	2	Kertu Ly Alnek	Estonia	57.13	
39	2	7	Sara Junevik	Sweden	57.24	
40	2	1	Anastasiya Kuliashova	Belarus	57.27	
41	3	8	Aleksa Gold	Estonia	57.28	
42	2	3	Gabriela Ņikitina	Latvia	57.32	
43	2	9	Laura Benková	Slovakia	57.74	
44	2	4	Aleksandra Polańska	Poland	57.92	
45	2	0	Sezin Eliguel	Turkey	58.07	
46	1	3	Ani Poghosyan	Armenia	59.48	
47	1	6	Fatima Alkaramova	Azerbaijan	59.49	
48	1	4	Sara Lettoli	San Marino	1:00.01	
49	1	2	Elisa Bernardi	San Marino	1:00.49	
50	1	5	Nikol Merizaj	Albania	1:00.59	
51	1	7	Fjorda Shabani	Kosovo	1:02.74	
	1	1	Eda Zeqiri	Kosovo	Did not start	
	4	0	Valentine Dumont	Belgium	Did not start	
	4	9	Mimosa Jallow	Finland	Did not start	
	6	5	Ranomi Kromowidjojo	Netherlands	Did not start	
	6	6	Annika Bruhn	Germany	Did not start	

=== Semifinals ===
The semifinals were started on 7 August at 17:11.

==== Semifinal 1 ====
Rank	Lane	Name	Nationality	Time	Notes
1	4	Sarah Sjöström	Sweden	52.67	Q, =CR
2	5	Femke Heemskerk	Netherlands	53.35	Q
3	3	Freya Anderson	Great Britain	53.90	Q
4	6	Federica Pellegrini	Italy	54.28	Q
5	2	Anika Apostalon	Czech Republic	54.74	
6	7	Katarzyna Wilk	Poland	54.81	
7	1	Nina Kost	Switzerland	54.88	
8	8	Anna Hopkin	Great Britain	55.15	

==== Semifinal 2 ====
Rank	Lane	Name	Nationality	Time	Notes
1	5	Charlotte Bonnet	France	53.55	Q
2	6	Maria Kameneva	Russia	53.60	Q, NR
3	2	Marie Wattel	France	54.12	Q
4	3	Signe Bro	Denmark	54.27	Q
5	8	Lidón Muñoz	Spain	54.64	
6	4	Pernille Blume	Denmark	54.71	
7	1	Andrea Murez	Israel	55.05	
8	7	Arina Openysheva	Russia	57.07	

=== Final ===
The final was started on 8 August at 16:43.

Rank	Lane	Name	Nationality	Time	Notes
1st place, gold medalist(s)	4	Sarah Sjöström	Sweden	52.93	
2nd place, silver medalist(s)	5	Femke Heemskerk	Netherlands	53.23	
3rd place, bronze medalist(s)	3	Charlotte Bonnet	France	53.35	
4	2	Freya Anderson	Great Britain	53.61	EJ
5	8	Federica Pellegrini	Italy	54.04	
6	6	Maria Kameneva	Russia	54.07	
7	7	Marie Wattel	France	54.52	
8	1	Signe Bro	Denmark	54.56	
