= Swimming at the 2015 World Aquatics Championships – Women's 4 × 100 metre freestyle relay =

Women's 4 × 100 metre freestyle relay at the 2015 World Aquatics Championships
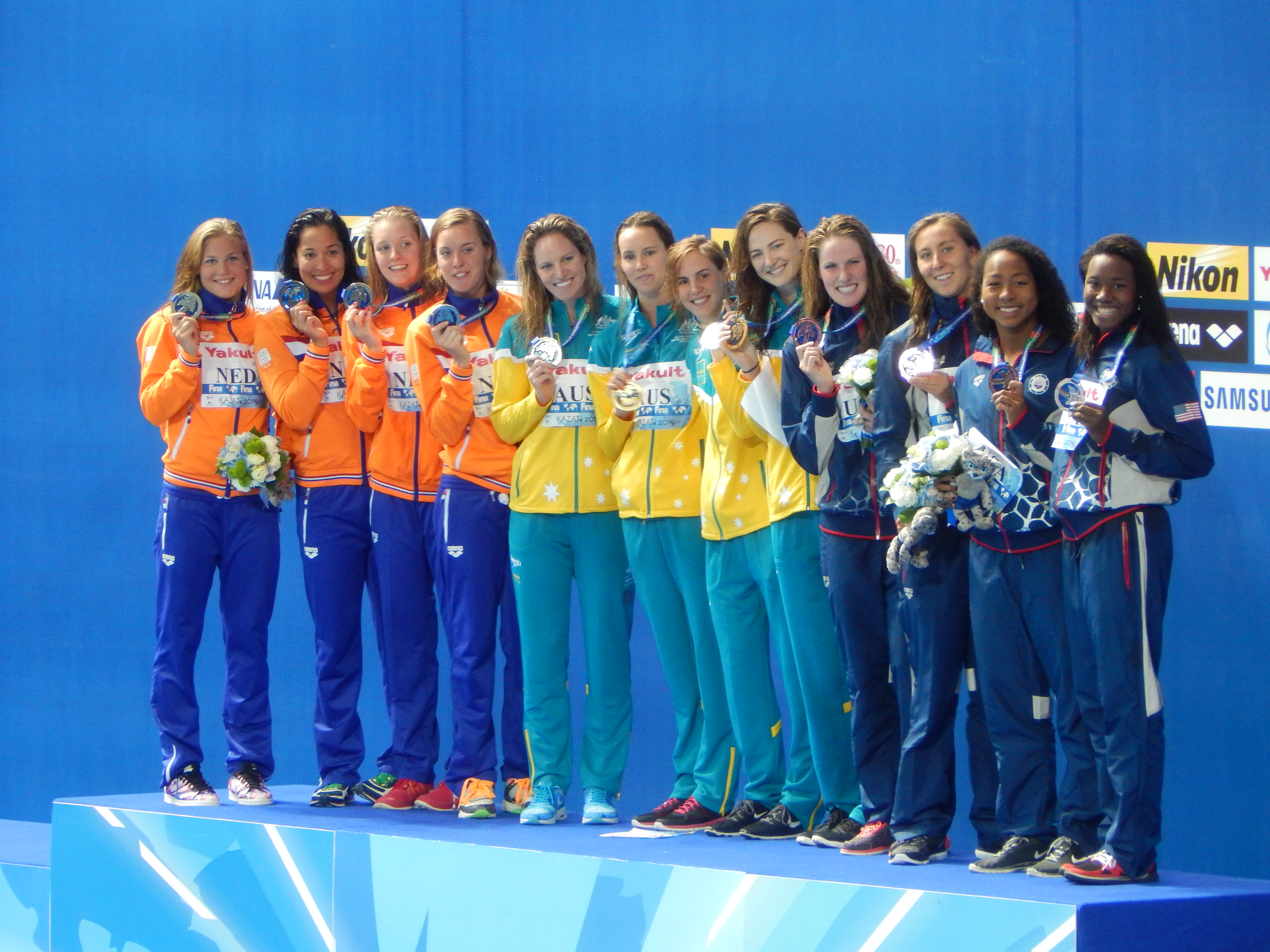
- Victory Ceremony
- Dates: 2 August (heats and final)
- Competitors: 86 from 20 nations
- Winning time: 3:31.48

Medalists
gold medal	Emily Seebohm; Emma McKeon; Bronte Campbell; Cate Campbell; Madison Wilson; Melanie Wright; Bronte Barratt	Australia
silver medal	Ranomi Kromowidjojo; Maud van der Meer; Marrit Steenbergen; Femke Heemskerk	Netherlands
bronze medal	Missy Franklin; Margo Geer; Lia Neal; Simone Manuel; Shannon Vreeland; Abbey Weitzeil	United States

The women's 4 × 100 metre freestyle relay competition of the swimming events at the 2015 World Aquatics Championships was held on 2 August with the heats and the final.

== Records ==
Prior to the competition, the existing world and championship records were as follows.

World record	Australia	3:30.98	Glasgow, Scotland	24 July 2014
Competition record	Netherlands	3:31.72	Rome, Italy	26 July 2009

The following new records were set during this competition.

Date	Event	Nation	Time	Record
2 August	Final	Australia	3:31.48	CR

== Results ==
=== Heats ===
The heats were held at 11:58.

Rank	Heat	Lane	Nation	Swimmers	Time	Notes
1	2	9	United States	Shannon Vreeland (54.37); Abbey Weitzeil (53.85); Margo Geer (53.37); Lia Neal (53.93)	3:35.52	Q
2	2	8	Australia	Emily Seebohm (53.93); Madison Wilson (53.82); Melanie Wright (53.51); Bronte Barratt (54.60)	3:35.86	Q
3	1	7	Netherlands	Maud van der Meer (54.69); Marrit Steenbergen (54.72); Femke Heemskerk (53.00); Ranomi Kromowidjojo (53.50)	3:35.91	Q
4	1	3	Sweden	Michelle Coleman (54.00); Louise Hansson (54.30); Magdalena Kuras (55.19); Sarah Sjöström (52.75)	3:36.24	Q
5	1	9	Canada	Sandrine Mainville (54.57); Michelle Williams (54.06); Victoria Poon (54.91); Chantal van Landeghem (54.10)	3:37.64	Q
5	2	1	China	Zhu Menghui (54.14); Tang Yuting (54.55); Fang Yi (54.96); Shen Duo (53.99)	3:37.64	Q
7	1	6	Italy	Erika Ferraioli (54.77); Silvia Di Pietro (54.13); Federica Pellegrini (53.92); Laura Letrari (55.06)	3:37.88	Q
8	2	5	France	Charlotte Bonnet (53.95); Béryl Gastaldello (54.76); Cloé Hache (54.89); Anna Santamans (54.75)	3:38.35	Q
9	2	3	Japan	Miki Uchida (54.25); Rikako Ikee (54.63); Misaki Yamaguchi (54.58); Yayoi Matsumoto (55.01)	3:38.47	
10	2	2	Russia	Veronika Popova (54.51); Nataliya Lovtsova (54.66); Viktoriya Andreyeva (54.49); Mariia Kameneva (54.97)	3:38.63	
11	1	4	Brazil	Larissa Oliveira (55.08); Graciele Herrmann (55.96); Etiene Medeiros (54.49); Daynara de Paula (54.71)	3:40.24	
12	2	4	Poland	Katarzyna Wilk (54.86); Alicja Tchórz (55.11); Aleksandra Urbańczyk (56.16); Anna Dowgiert (54.76)	3:40.89	
13	1	1	Germany	Annika Bruhn (55.34); Dorothea Brandt (54.99); Alexandra Wenk (55.02); Marlene Huther (56.21)	3:41.56	
14	1	5	Hong Kong	Camille Cheng (55.58); Stephanie Au (56.30); Sze Hang Yu (55.40); Siobhán Haughey (54.83)	3:42.11	
15	1	0	Switzerland	Maria Ugolkova (56.42); Sasha Touretski (55.49); Danielle Villars (55.42); Noemi Girardet (56.37)	3:43.70	NR
16	2	6	Austria	Birgit Koschischek (55.70); Lisa Zaiser (54.95); Lena Kreundl (56.88); Jördis Steinegger (56.53)	3:44.06	
17	1	2	Colombia	Isabella Arcila (56.19); Carolina Colorado Henao (56.18); María Álvarez (57.68); Jessica Camposano (56.10)	3:46.15	NR
18	1	8	Singapore	Amanda Lim (57.44); Quah Ting Wen (56.22); Marina Chan (58.78); Rachel Tseng (58.66)	3:51.10	
19	2	0	Turkey	Gizem Bozkurt (58.33); Ekaterina Avramova (55.92); Merve Eroglu (1:00.89); Halime Zülal Zeren (58.08)	3:53.22	
	2	7	Finland	Hanna-Maria Seppälä (55.83); Mimosa Jallow (55.43); Roosa Mört (57.26); Fanny Teijonsalo (DSQ)	DSQ	

=== Final ===
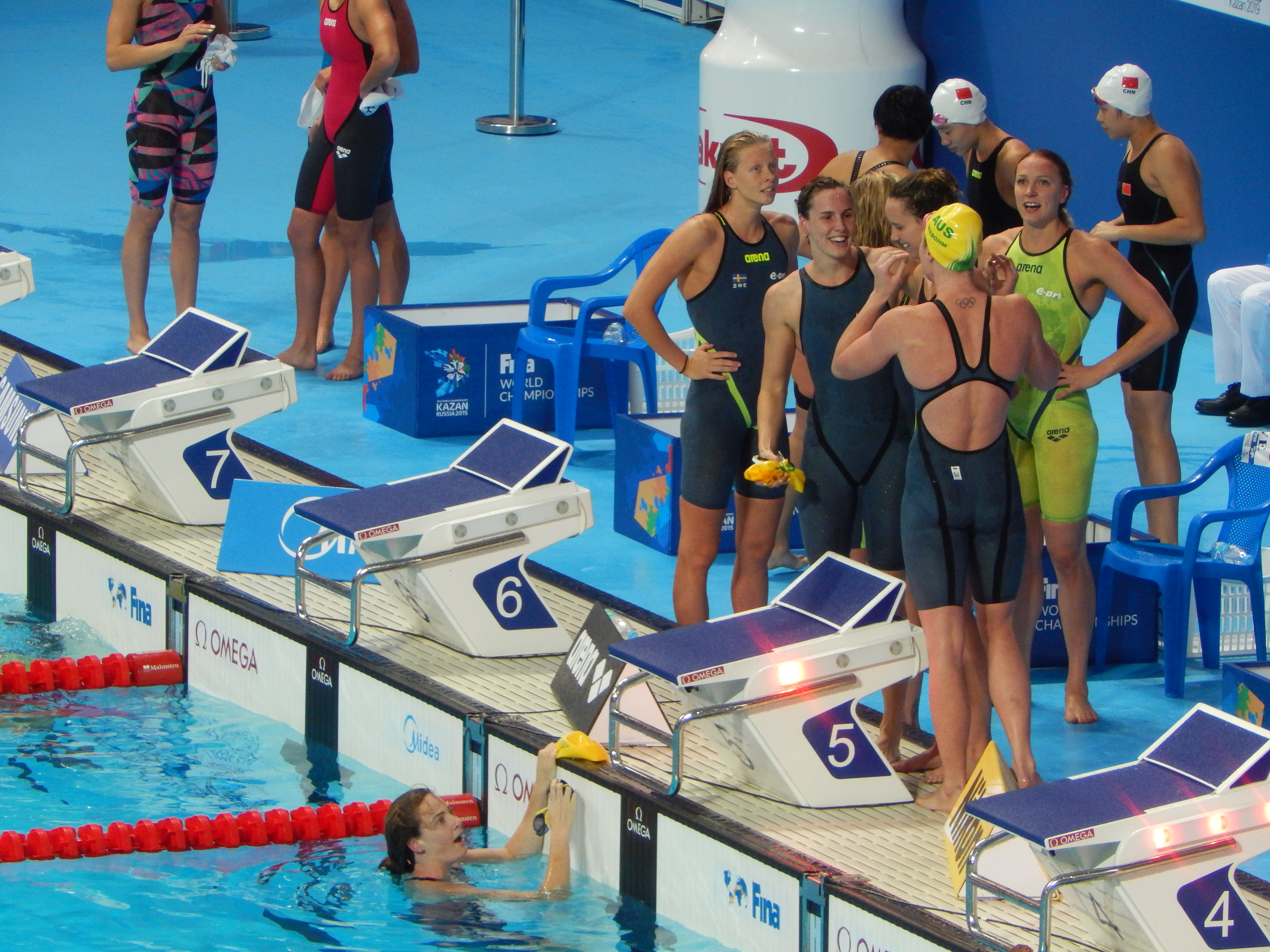
Team Australia wins

The final was held at 18:45.

Rank	Lane	Nation	Swimmers	Time	Notes
1st place, gold medalist(s)	5	Australia	Emily Seebohm (53.92); Emma McKeon (53.57); Bronte Campbell (51.77); Cate Campbell (52.22)	3:31.48	CR
2nd place, silver medalist(s)	3	Netherlands	Ranomi Kromowidjojo (53.30); Maud van der Meer (54.50); Marrit Steenbergen (53.88); Femke Heemskerk (51.99)	3:33.67	
3rd place, bronze medalist(s)	4	United States	Missy Franklin (53.68); Margo Geer (54.14); Lia Neal (53.70); Simone Manuel (53.09)	3:34.61	
4	6	Sweden	Michelle Coleman (54.43); Louise Hansson (53.84); Sarah Sjöström (52.38); Magdalena Kuras (55.06)	3:35.71	
5	2	Canada	Sandrine Mainville (53.85); Michelle Williams (54.54); Chantal van Landeghem (53.51); Katerine Savard (54.54)	3:36.44	NR
6	1	Italy	Erika Ferraioli (54.80); Silvia Di Pietro (53.63); Laura Letrari (55.00); Federica Pellegrini (53.73)	3:37.16	NR
7	7	China	Zhu Menghui (54.38); Tang Yuting (54.45); Fang Yi (54.98); Shen Duo (53.83)	3:37.64	
8	8	France	Charlotte Bonnet (54.10); Béryl Gastaldello (54.89); Cloé Hache (54.84); Anna Santamans (54.63)	3:38.46	
