= Swimming at the 2016 Summer Olympics – Women's 4 × 100 metre freestyle relay =

Women's 4 × 100 metre freestyle relay at the Games of the XXXI Olympiad
- Venue: Olympic Aquatics Stadium
- Dates: 6 August 2016 (heats & final)
- Competitors: 71 from 16 nations
- Teams: 16
- Winning time: 3:30.65 WR

Medalists
1st place, gold medalist(s)		Emma McKeon, Brittany Elmslie, Bronte Campbell, Cate Campbell, Madison Wilson*	Australia
2nd place, silver medalist(s)		Simone Manuel, Abbey Weitzeil , Dana Vollmer, Katie Ledecky, Amanda Weir*, Lia Neal*, Allison Schmitt*	United States
3rd place, bronze medalist(s)		Sandrine Mainville, Chantal Van Landeghem, Taylor Ruck, Penny Oleksiak, Michelle Williams*; *Indicates the swimmer only competed in the preliminary heats.	Canada

The women's 4 × 100 metre freestyle relay event at the 2016 Summer Olympics took place on 6 August at the Olympic Aquatics Stadium.

== Summary ==
As expected, the Australian women's team solidified its triumph to set a new world record and defend the Olympic title in one of the program's freestyle relay races with the help of sterling final legs from sisters Bronte and Cate Campbell. Trailing half of the race with a marginal lead from the Americans, Bronte booted the Australians to the front with a third-leg split of 52.15, before her sister Cate (51.97) put on a fastest finish at the anchor leg to deliver the foursome of Emma McKeon (53.41) and Brittany Elmslie (53.12) a gold-medal time in 3:30.65. Moreover, they managed to break their own world record, set at the Commonwealth Games two years earlier, by a third of a second (3:30.98).

The U.S. team of Simone Manuel (53.36) and Abbey Weitzeil (52.56) handed Dana Vollmer the third-leg duties to maintain their lead, but Vollmer's split of 53.18 was just almost a second behind Bronte Campbell that pushed Australia to the front. As Katie Ledecky dove into the pool at the final exchange with a split of 52.79, she could not catch Cate Campbell near the wall to leave the Americans with a silver medal in 3:31.89. Meanwhile, Sandrine Mainville (53.86), Chantal Van Landeghem (53.12), Taylor Ruck (53.19), and Penny Oleksiak (52.72) ended Canada's 20-year medal drought for the female swimmers by taking home the bronze in 3:32.89.

The Dutch quartet of Marrit Steenbergen (54.29), Femke Heemskerk (53.47), Inge Dekker (53.85), and three-time gold medalist Ranomi Kromowidjojo (52.20) fell short of the medal podium with a fourth-place time in 3:33.81, while Sweden (3:35.90), Italy (3:36.78), France (3:37.45), and Japan (3:37.78) also vied for an Olympic medal.

Earlier in the prelims, the Australian team of Elmslie (53.22), Campbell sisters Bronte (53.26) and Cate (51.80), and Madison Wilson (54.11) grabbed the top seed with a 3:32.39 to overturn their own existing Olympic record by 86-hundredths of a second.

The medals were presented by John Dowling Coates, Australia Vice President of the IOC and Dennis Miller, Vice President of FINA.

== Records ==
Prior to this competition, the existing world and Olympic records were as follows.

World record	Australia (AUS); Bronte Campbell (53.15); Melanie Schlanger (52.76); Emma McKeon (52.91); Cate Campbell (52.16)	3:30.98	Glasgow, Scotland	24 July 2014
Olympic record	Australia; Alicia Coutts (53.90); Cate Campbell (53.19); Brittany Elmslie (53.41); Melanie Schlanger (52.65)	3:33.15	London, England	28 July 2012

The following records were established during the competition:

Date	Event	Name	Nation	Time	Record
6 August	Heat 2	Madison Wilson (54.11); Brittany Elmslie (53.22); Bronte Campbell (53.26); Cate Campbell (51.80)	Australia	3:32.39	OR
6 August	Final	Emma McKeon (53.41); Brittany Elmslie (53.12); Bronte Campbell (52.15); Cate Campbell (51.97)	Australia	3:30.65	WR

== Competition format ==
The competition consisted of two rounds: heats and a final. The relay teams with the best 8 times in the heats advanced to the final. Swim-offs were used as necessary to break ties for advancement to the next round.

== Results ==
=== Heats ===
A total of sixteen countries have qualified to participate. The best eight from two heats advanced to the final.

Rank	Heat	Lane	Nation	Swimmers	Time	Notes
1	2	4	Australia	Madison Wilson (54.11); Brittany Elmslie (53.22); Bronte Campbell (53.26); Cate Campbell (51.80)	3:32.39	Q, OR
2	2	5	United States	Amanda Weir (53.60); Lia Neal (53.63); Allison Schmitt (53.72); Katie Ledecky (52.64)	3:33.59	Q
3	2	3	Canada	Sandrine Mainville (54.17); Chantal Van Landeghem (52.90); Michelle Williams (53.73); Taylor Ruck (53.04)	3:33.84	Q, NR
4	1	3	Italy	Erika Ferraioli (54.91); Silvia di Pietro (53.96); Aglaia Pezzato (53.86); Federica Pellegrini (53.17)	3:35.90	Q NR
5	1	4	Netherlands	Inge Dekker (54.75); Marrit Steenbergen (53.31); Maud van der Meer (53.88); Femke Heemskerk (54.00)	3:35.94	Q
6	1	5	Sweden	Michelle Coleman (54.39); Louise Hansson (54.69); Ida Lindborg (54.77); Sarah Sjöström (52.57)	3:36.42	Q
7	1	2	Japan	Miki Uchida (53.93); Rikako Ikee (53.41); Misaki Yamaguchi (54.87); Yayoi Matsumoto (54.53)	3:36.74	Q, NR
8	2	2	France	Béryl Gastaldello (54.94); Charlotte Bonnet (53.16); Mathilde Cini (54.64); Anna Santamans (54.11)	3:36.85	Q, NR
9	1	6	China	Zhu Menghui (54.06); Sun Meichen (54.79); Tang Yi (54.56); Shen Duo (53.84)	3:37.25	
10	2	7	Russia	Veronika Popova (54.35); Viktoriya Andreeva (54.45); Rozaliya Nasretdinova (54.32); Nataliya Lovtsova (54.56)	3:37.68	NR
11	2	6	Brazil	Larissa Oliveira (55.54); Etiene Medeiros (53.99); Daynara de Paula (54.81); Manuella Lyrio (55.06)	3:39.40	
12	1	7	Denmark	Pernille Blume (54.54); Julie Kepp Jensen (54.79); Sarah Bro (55.75); Mie Nielsen (54.37)	3:39.45	
13	2	1	Spain	Fatima Gallardo (55.84); Marta González (54.98); Patricia Castro (55.08); Melania Costa Schmid (54.56)	3:40.46	NR
14	2	8	Switzerland	Maria Ugolkova (54.75 NR); Alexandra Touretski (55.28); Danielle Villars (55.37); Noemi Girardet (55.62)	3:41.02	NR
15	1	1	Poland	Katarzyna Wilk (55.34); Alicja Tchórz (55.01); Aleksandra Urbańczyk (55.78); Anna Dowgiert (55.30)	3:41.43	
16	1	8	Israel	Keren Siebner (55.60); Zohar Shikler (55.29); Amit Ivry (55.71); Andrea Murez (55.37)	3:41.97	

=== Final ===
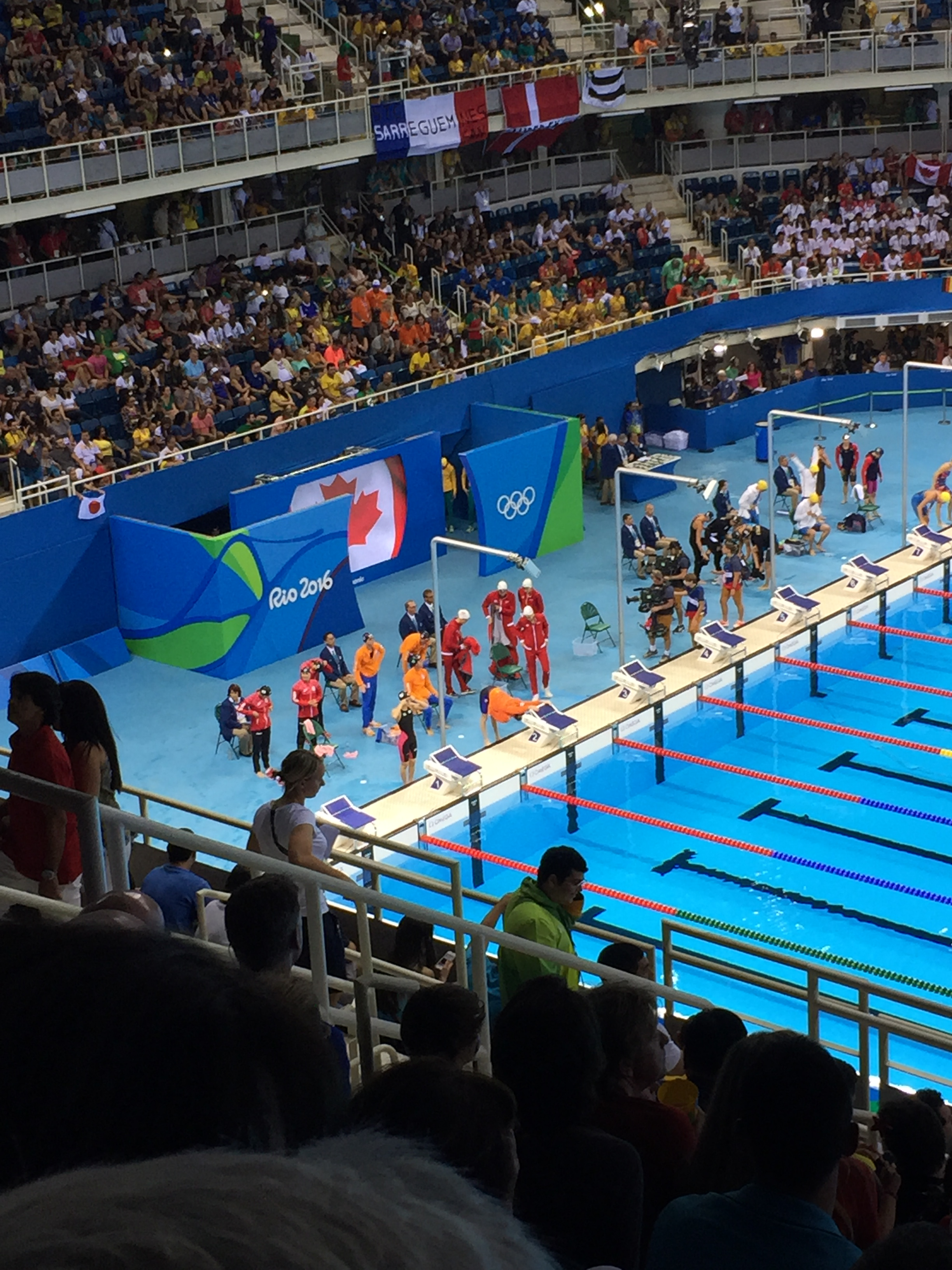
The relay teams prepare for the final.

Rank	Lane	Nation	Swimmers	Time	Notes
1st place, gold medalist(s)	4	Australia	Emma McKeon (53.41); Brittany Elmslie (53.12); Bronte Campbell (52.15); Cate Campbell (51.97)	3:30.65	WR
2nd place, silver medalist(s)	5	United States	Simone Manuel (53.36); Abbey Weitzeil (52.56); Dana Vollmer (53.18); Katie Ledecky (52.79)	3:31.89	AM
3rd place, bronze medalist(s)	3	Canada	Sandrine Mainville (53.86); Chantal Van Landeghem (53.12); Taylor Ruck (53.19); Penny Oleksiak (52.72)	3:32.89	NR
4	2	Netherlands	Marrit Steenbergen (54.29); Femke Heemskerk (53.47); Inge Dekker (53.85); Ranomi Kromowidjojo (52.20)	3:33.81	
5	7	Sweden	Michelle Coleman (54.19); Sarah Sjöström (52.47); Ida Marko-Varga (54.70); Louise Hansson (54.54)	3:35.90	
6	6	Italy	Erika Ferraioli (55.21); Silvia di Pietro (53.69); Aglaia Pezzato (53.99); Federica Pellegrini (53.89)	3:36.78	
7	8	France	Béryl Gastaldello (54.83); Charlotte Bonnet (53.17); Mathilde Cini (54.92); Anna Santamans (54.53)	3:37.45	
8	1	Japan	Miki Uchida (54.23); Rikako Ikee (53.98); Misaki Yamaguchi (55.11); Yayoi Matsumoto (54.46)	3:37.78	
