= Swimming at the 2014 European Aquatics Championships – Women's 4 × 200 metre freestyle relay =

Women's 4 × 200 metre freestyle relay at the Swimming at the 2014 European Aquatics Championships
- Dates: 21 August
- Competitors: 8 from 32 nations
- Winning time: 7:50.53

Medalists
gold medal	Alice Mizzau; Stefania Pirozzi; Chiara Masini Luccetti; Federica Pellegrini	Italy
silver medal	Michelle Coleman; Louise Hansson; Sarah Sjöström; Stina Gardell	Sweden
bronze medal	Zsuzsanna Jakabos; Evelyn Verrasztó; Boglárka Kapás; Katinka Hosszú	Hungary

The Women's 4 × 200 metre freestyle relay competition of the 2014 European Aquatics Championships was held on 21 August. With eight entries there were no preliminary heats; only one final race was contested.

== Records ==
Prior to the competition, the existing world, European and championship records were as follows.

	Nation	Time	Location	Date
World record	China	7:42.08	Rome	30 July 2009
European record	Great Britain	7:45.51	Rome	30 July 2009
Championship record	Germany	7:50.82	Budapest	3 August 2006

== Results ==
=== Final ===
The final was held at 19:38.

Rank	Lane	Nationality	Swimmers	Time	Notes
1st place, gold medalist(s)	1	Italy	Alice Mizzau (1:58.34); Stefania Pirozzi (1:57.63); Chiara Masini Luccetti (1:58.06); Federica Pellegrini (1:56.50)	7:50.53	CR
2nd place, silver medalist(s)	2	Sweden	Michelle Coleman (1:57.20); Louise Hansson (1:58.68); Sarah Sjöström (1:53.64); Stina Gardell (2:01.51)	7:51.03	
3rd place, bronze medalist(s)	8	Hungary	Zsuzsanna Jakabos (1:59.25); Evelyn Verrasztó (1:59.69); Boglárka Kapás (1:58.71); Katinka Hosszú (1:56.58)	7:54.23	
4	5	Russia	Veronika Popova (1:56.78); Viktoriya Andreeva (1:59.11); Arina Openysheva (1:59.54); Victoria Malyutina (1:59.43)	7:54.86	
5	4	France	Charlotte Bonnet (1:58.62); Ophelie Cyrielle Etienne (2:00.11); Coralie Balmy (1:56.28); Cloe Hache (2:00.35)	7:55.36	
6	3	United Kingdom	Rebecca Turner (2:00.42); Jazmin Carlin (1:57.46); Shauna Lee (1:59.77); Aimee Willmott (1:59.60)	7:57.25	
6	7	Spain	Melanie Costa Schmid (1:57.04); Fatima Gallardo Carapeto (1:59.77); Judit Ignacio Sorribes (2:00.34); Mireia Belmonte Garcia (2:00.10)	7:57.25	
8	6	Switzerland	Noemi Girardet (2:03.05); Danielle Carmen Villars (2:01.99); Lisa Stamm (2:03.56); Martina Van Berkel (2:01.93)	8:10.53	
