= Swimming at the 2014 European Aquatics Championships – Women's 200 metre freestyle =

Women's 200 metre freestyle at the Swimming at the 2014 European Aquatics Championships
- Dates: 22–23 August
- Competitors: 33 from 18 nations
- Winning time: 1:56.01

Medalists
| gold medal | Federica Pellegrini | Italy |
| silver medal | Katinka Hosszú | Hungary |
| bronze medal | Femke Heemskerk | Netherlands |

The Women's 200 metre freestyle competition of the 2014 European Aquatics Championships was held on 22–23 August.

== Records ==
Prior to the competition, the existing world, European and championship records were as follows.

| | Name | Nation | Time | Location | Date |
|---|---|---|---|---|---|
| World record | Federica Pellegrini | Italy | 1:52.98 | Rome | 29 July 2009 |
| European record | Federica Pellegrini | Italy | 1:52.98 | Rome | 29 July 2009 |
| Championship record | Federica Pellegrini | Italy | 1:55.45 | Budapest | 14 August 2010 |

== Results ==
=== Heats ===
The heats were held at 09:45.

| Rank | Heat | Lane | Name | Nationality | Time | Notes |
|---|---|---|---|---|---|---|
| 1 | 3 | 5 | Katinka Hosszú | Hungary | 1:57.05 | Q |
| 2 | 4 | 5 | Melani Costa | Spain | 1:58.60 | Q |
| 3 | 2 | 4 | Veronika Popova | Russia | 1:58.66 | Q |
| 4 | 3 | 4 | Federica Pellegrini | Italy | 1:59.14 | Q |
| 5 | 4 | 3 | Charlotte Bonnet | France | 1:59.55 | Q |
| 6 | 2 | 5 | Femke Heemskerk | Netherlands | 1:59.77 | Q |
| 7 | 3 | 8 | Nina Rangelova | Bulgaria | 2:00.26 | Q |
| 7 | 4 | 6 | Viktoriya Andreeva | Russia | 2:00.26 | Q |
| 9 | 4 | 2 | Louise Hansson | Sweden | 2:00.29 | Q |
| 10 | 2 | 7 | Chiara Masini | Italy | 2:00.63 | Q |
| 11 | 4 | 1 | Shauna Lee | Great Britain | 2:00.72 | Q |
| 12 | 3 | 2 | Esmee Vermeulen | Netherlands | 2:00.74 | Q |
| 13 | 2 | 8 | Cecilie Johannessen | Norway | 2:00.87 | Q |
| 14 | 3 | 7 | Lisa Zaiser | Austria | 2:00.92 | Q |
| 14 | 1 | 4 | Katarina Simonović | Serbia | 2:00.92 | Q |
| 16 | 3 | 1 | Victoria Malyutina | Russia | 2:01.28 | |
| 17 | 4 | 8 | Wendy van der Zanden | Netherlands | 2:01.38 | |
| 18 | 2 | 2 | Diletta Carli | Italy | 2:01.56 | |
| 19 | 3 | 3 | Michelle Coleman | Sweden | 2:01.75 | Q |
| 20 | 3 | 0 | Danielle Villars | Switzerland | 2:02.21 | |
| 21 | 2 | 6 | Maria Baklakova | Russia | 2:02.31 | |
| 22 | 4 | 9 | Noemi Girardet | Switzerland | 2:02.60 | |
| 23 | 4 | 0 | Isabelle Mabboux | France | 2:02.83 | |
| 24 | 1 | 3 | Annick van Westendorp | Switzerland | 2:03.20 | |
| 25 | 2 | 9 | Gizem Bozkurt | Turkey | 2:03.38 | |
| 26 | 1 | 1 | Alyona Kyselyova | Ukraine | 2:03.77 | |
| 27 | 3 | 9 | Julie Lauridsen | Denmark | 2:03.81 | |
| 28 | 2 | 1 | Cloe Hache | France | 2:03.93 | |
| 29 | 1 | 7 | Lisa Stamm | Switzerland | 2:04.16 | |
| 30 | 2 | 0 | Stina Gardell | Sweden | 2:04.69 | |
| 31 | 1 | 6 | Katharina Egger | Austria | 2:05.73 | |
| 32 | 1 | 5 | Anna Kolárová | Czech Republic | 2:07.07 | |
| 33 | 1 | 8 | Monika Vasilyan | Armenia | 2:12.14 | |
| — | 1 | 2 | Věra Kopřivová | Czech Republic | | DNS |
| — | 2 | 3 | Jazmin Carlin | Great Britain | | DNS |
| — | 3 | 6 | Alice Mizzau | Italy | | DNS |
| — | 4 | 4 | Sarah Sjöström | Sweden | | DNS |
| — | 4 | 7 | Rebecca Turner | Great Britain | | DNS |

=== Semifinals ===
The semifinals were held at 18:18.

==== Semifinal 1 ====
| Rank | Lane | Name | Nationality | Time | Notes |
|---|---|---|---|---|---|
| 1 | 5 | Federica Pellegrini | Italy | 1:56.69 | Q |
| 2 | 3 | Femke Heemskerk | Netherlands | 1:57.15 | Q |
| 3 | 8 | Michelle Coleman | Sweden | 1:57.18 | Q |
| 4 | 4 | Melani Costa | Spain | 1:57.24 | Q |
| 5 | 6 | Nina Rangelova | Bulgaria | 1:59.06 | Q |
| 6 | 7 | Esmee Vermeulen | Netherlands | 1:59.89 | |
| 7 | 2 | Chiara Masini | Italy | 2:00.25 | |
| 8 | 1 | Katarina Simonović | Serbia | 2:00.77 | |

==== Semifinal 2 ====
| Rank | Lane | Name | Nationality | Time | Notes |
|---|---|---|---|---|---|
| 1 | 5 | Veronika Popova | Russia | 1:56.84 | Q |
| 2 | 4 | Katinka Hosszú | Hungary | 1:56.96 | Q |
| 3 | 3 | Charlotte Bonnet | France | 1:58.05 | Q |
| 4 | 2 | Louise Hansson | Sweden | 1:59.80 | |
| 5 | 8 | Lisa Zaiser | Austria | 1:59.97 | |
| 6 | 7 | Shauna Lee | Great Britain | 2:00.09 | |
| 7 | 6 | Viktoriya Andreeva | Russia | 2:01.06 | |
| 8 | 1 | Cecilie Johannessen | Norway | 2:01.32 | |

=== Final ===
The final was held at 16:31.

| Rank | Lane | Name | Nationality | Time | Notes |
|---|---|---|---|---|---|
| 1st place, gold medalist(s) | 4 | Federica Pellegrini | Italy | 1:56.01 | |
| 2nd place, silver medalist(s) | 3 | Katinka Hosszú | Hungary | 1:56.69 | |
| 3rd place, bronze medalist(s) | 6 | Femke Heemskerk | Netherlands | 1:56.81 | |
| 4 | 7 | Melani Costa | Spain | 1:56.92 | |
| 5 | 5 | Veronika Popova | Russia | 1:57.20 | |
| 6 | 2 | Michelle Coleman | Sweden | 1:57.65 | |
| 7 | 1 | Charlotte Bonnet | France | 1:58.22 | |
| 8 | 8 | Nina Rangelova | Bulgaria | 1:58.56 | |
