= Swimming at the 2014 European Aquatics Championships – Women's 4 × 100 metre freestyle relay =

Women's 4 × 100 metre freestyle relay at the Swimming at the 2014 European Aquatics Championships
- Dates: 18 August
- Competitors: 7 from 28 nations
- Winning time: 3:35.82

Medalists
gold medal	Michelle Coleman; Magdalena Kuras; Louise Hansson; Sarah Sjöström	Sweden
silver medal	Inge Dekker; Maud van der Meer; Esmee Vermeulen; Femke Heemskerk	Netherlands
bronze medal	Alice Mizzau; Erika Ferraioli; Giada Galizi; Federica Pellegrini	Italy

The Women's 4 × 100 metre freestyle relay competition of the 2014 European Aquatics Championships was held on 18 August. With seven entries there was no preliminary heats; only one final race was contested.

== Records ==
Prior to the competition, the existing world, European and championship records were as follows.

	Nation	Time	Location	Date
World record	Australia	3:30.98	Glasgow	24 July 2014
European record	Netherlands	3:31.72	Rome	26 July 2009
Championship record	Netherlands	3:33.62	Eindhoven	18 March 2008

== Results ==
=== Final ===
The final was held at 19:16.

Rank	Lane	Nationality	Swimmers	Time	Notes
1st place, gold medalist(s)	4	Sweden	Michelle Coleman (53.85); Magdalena Kuras (55.55); Louise Hansson (54.28); Sarah Sjöström (52.14)	3:35.82	
2nd place, silver medalist(s)	5	Netherlands	Inge Dekker (54.50); Maud van der Meer (54.49); Esmee Vermeulen (54.49); Femke Heemskerk (52.78)	3:36.26	
3rd place, bronze medalist(s)	6	Italy	Alice Mizzau (55.25); Erika Ferraioli (54.14); Giada Galizi (54.59); Federica Pellegrini (53.65)	3:37.63	
4	7	Russia	Veronika Popova (53.94); Viktoriya Andreeva (55.24); Arina Openyshena (54.80); Margarita Nesterova (54.57)	3:38.55	
5	2	France	Charlotte Bonnet (54.86); Anna Santamans (54.99); Cloé Hache (55.29); Coralie Balmy (55.07)	3:40.21	
6	3	Finland	Hanna-Maria Seppälä (55.44); Noora Laukkanen (57.40); Mimosa Jallow (55.94); Jenna Laukkanen (58.24)	3:47.02	
—	8	Denmark	Jeanette Ottesen (53.59); Julie Levisen; Mie Nielsen; Pernille Blume		DSQ
