= Swimming at the 2018 Mediterranean Games – Women's 100 metre freestyle =

Women's 100 metre freestyle at the 2018 Mediterranean Games
- Venue: Campclar Aquatic Center
- Location: Tarragona, Spain
- Dates: 23 June
- Competitors: 19 from 13 nations
- Winning time: 54.91

Medalists
gold medal	Erika Ferraioli	Italy
silver medal	Lidón Muñoz	Spain
bronze medal	Neža Klančar	Slovenia

The women's 100 metre freestyle competition at the 2018 Mediterranean Games was held on 23 June 2018 at the Campclar Aquatic Center.

== Records ==
Prior to this competition, the existing world and Mediterranean Games records were as follows:

World record	Sarah Sjöström (SWE)	51.71	Budapest, Hungary	23 July 2017
Mediterranean Games record	Malia Metella (FRA)	54.72	Pescara, Italy	27 June 2009

== Results ==
=== Heats ===
The heats were held at 09:50.

Rank	Heat	Lane	Name	Nationality	Time	Notes
1	2	5	Laura Letrari	Italy	55.68	Q
1	2	4	Erika Ferraioli	Italy	55.68	Q
3	1	3	Assia Touati	France	55.80	Q
4	1	5	Neža Klančar	Slovenia	55.86	Q
5	1	4	Farida Osman	Egypt	55.87	Q, WD
6	3	4	Lidón Muñoz	Spain	56.14	Q
7	3	3	Selen Özbilen	Turkey	56.29	Q
8	1	6	Sofia Klikopoulou	Greece	56.57	Q
9	3	5	Léna Bousquin	France	56.64	Q
10	3	6	Kalia Antoniou	Cyprus	56.74	
11	2	6	Vasiliki Baka	Greece	57.03	
12	2	3	Marta Cano	Spain	57.24	
13	3	2	Sezin Eligül	Turkey	57.33	
14	2	2	Rita Frischknecht	Portugal	57.82	
15	3	7	Tonia Papapetrou	Cyprus	58.06	
16	1	2	Lamija Medošević	Bosnia and Herzegovina	58.46	
17	2	7	Nesrine Medjahed	Algeria	58.66	
18	3	1	Nikol Merizaj	Albania	58.97	NR
19	1	7	Sara Lettoli	San Marino	59.62	

=== Final ===
The final was held at 17:45.

Rank	Lane	Name	Nationality	Time	Notes
1st place, gold medalist(s)	5	Erika Ferraioli	Italy	54.91	
2nd place, silver medalist(s)	2	Lidón Muñoz	Spain	55.28	
3rd place, bronze medalist(s)	6	Neža Klančar	Slovenia	55.40	
4	3	Assia Touati	France	55.81	
5	4	Laura Letrari	Italy	56.04	
6	7	Selen Özbilen	Turkey	56.16	
7	1	Sofia Klikopoulou	Greece	56.27	
8	8	Léna Bousquin	France	56.70	
