= Marta González =

Marta González may refer to:

- Marta González (swimmer) (born 1995), Spanish swimmer
- Marta Terry González (1931–2018), Cuban librarian
- Marta González Vázquez (born 1965), Spanish historian and politician
- Marta González Olea, Chilean politician
- Marta Mangué González, (born 1983), Spanish handballer
