= Swimming at the 2011 Military World Games =

Swimming at the 2011 Military World Games was held from 17 – 20 July 2011 at the Maria Lenk Aquatic Center, Rio de Janeiro.

== Medal summary ==
=== Men ===
Event	Gold		Silver		Bronze	
50 m freestyle	Fernando Silva (BRA)	22.83	Federico Bocchia (ITA)	23.03	Erik van Dooren (SUI)	23.14
100 m freestyle	Tom Siara (GER)	50.30	Liu Junwu (CHN)	50.43	Francesco Donni (ITA)	50.56
200 m freestyle	Cesare Sciochetti (ITA)	1:49.90	Tom Siara (GER)	1:50.21	Rodrigo Castro (BRA)	1:50.46
400 m freestyle	Zu Lijun (CHN)	3:52.08	Cesare Sciochetti (ITA)	3:52.26	Andrea Busato (ITA)	3:53.67
1500 m freestyle	Zu Lijun (CHN)	15:18.81	Luis Arapiraca (BRA)	15:32.34	Andrea Busato (ITA)	15:36.28
50 m backstroke	Gabriel Mangabeira (BRA)	25.73	Stefan Herbst (GER)	26.11	Felix Wolf (GER)	26.21
100 m backstroke	Gabriel Mangabeira (BRA)	55.30	Felix Wolf (GER)	55.58	Stefan Herbst (GER)	56.18
200 m backstroke	Felix Wolf (GER)	2:00.00	Diao Jigong (CHN)	2:00.26	Dimitrios Chasiotis (GRE)	2:03.00
50 m breaststroke	Luca Pizzini (ITA); Andrii Kovalenko (UKR)	28.21			Raphael Rodrigues (BRA)	28.25
100 m breaststroke	Huang Yunkun (CHN)	1:01.48	Tales Cerdeira (BRA)	1:01.64	Yevgeniy Ryzhkov (KAZ)	1:01.88
200 m breaststroke	Tales Cerdeira (BRA)	2:14.08	Luca Pizzini (ITA)	2:14.69	Huang Yunkun (CHN)	2:15.02
50 m butterfly	Gabriel Mangabeira (BRA)	24.04	Henrique Martins (BRA)	24.14	Tommaso Romani (ITA)	24.33
100 m butterfly	Gabriel Mangabeira (BRA)	52.94	Henrique Martins (BRA)	53.60	Nico van Duijn (SUI)	53.79
200 m butterfly	Wang Pudong (CHN)	1:59.57	Tom Siara (GER); Niccolò Beni (ITA)	1:59.89		
200 m individual medley	Diogo Yabe (BRA)	2:01.89	Lucas Salatta (BRA)	2:02.42	Georgios Aryblias (GRE)	2:05.80
400 m individual medley	Diogo Yabe (BRA)	4:22.50	Georgios Aryblias (GRE)	4:22.87	Lucas Salatta (BRA)	4:26.69
4 × 100 m freestyle relay	Italy; Federico Bocchia; Francesco Donin; Andrea Busato; Tommaso Romani	7:26.79	Brazil; Fernando Silva; Rodrigo Castro; Gabriel Mangabeira; André Daudt	7:28.99	China; Hu Yue; Qu Jingyu; Zu Lijun; Liu Junwu	7:29.06
4 × 200 m freestyle relay	Italy; Cesare Sciochetti; Francesco Donin; Niccolò Beni; Andrea Busato	7:26.79	Germany; Tom Siara; Felix Wolf; Andre Biere; Stefan Herbst	7:28.99	Greece; Konstantinos Siokos; Alexandros Skoutelas; Georgios Aryblias; Michalis Kikilis	7:29.06
4 × 100 m medley relay	Brazil; Gabriel Mangabeira; Tales Cerdeira; Henrique Martins; André Daudt	3:41.42	Germany; Felix Wolf; Erik Steinhagen; Markus Gierke; Tom Siara	3:43.62	Italy; Niccolò Beni; Luca Pizzini; Tommaso Romani; Francesco Donin	3:43.70

=== Women ===
Event	Gold		Silver		Bronze	
50 m freestyle	Li Yang (CHN)	25.36 CR	Jiao Liuyang (CHN)	25.85	Michelle Lenhardt (BRA); Erika Ferraioli (ITA)	26.05
100 m freestyle	Liu Lan (CHN)	55.96	Erika Ferraioli (ITA)	56.36	Liu Yiru (CHN)	56.43
200 m freestyle	Liu Yiru (CHN)	2:01.05	Martina de Memme (ITA)	2:01.15	Liu Lan (CHN)	2:02.45
400 m freestyle	Martina de Memme (ITA)	4:11.60 CR	Liu Yiru (CHN)	4:12.88	Ren Luomeng (CHN)	4:13.09
800 m freestyle	Martina de Memme (ITA)	8:37.09 CR	Joanna Maranhão (BRA)	8:39.68	Ren Luomeng (CHN)	8:46.43
50 m backstroke	Xu Tianlongzi (CHN)	28.29	Fabíola Molina (BRA)	28.30	Li Yang (CHN)	28.48
100 m backstroke	Fabíola Molina (BRA)	1:01.00	Xu Tianlongzi (CHN)	1:01.56	Li Jiaxing (CHN)	1:02.23
200 m backstroke	Li Jiaxing (CHN)	2:14.39	Fabíola Molina (BRA)	2:14.54	Xu Tianlongzi (CHN)	2:15.43
50 m breaststroke	Zhang Hongtao (CHN)	31.54	Wang Randi (CHN)	31.57	Tatiane Sakemi (BRA)	33.12
100 m breaststroke	Zhang Hongtao (CHN)	1:09.11	Wang Randi (CHN)	1:11.09	Svitlana Bondarenko (UKR)	1:12.10
200 m breaststroke	Zhang Hongtao (CHN)	2:30.96	Juliana Marin (BRA)	2:36.81	Veronica Demozzi (ITA)	2:39.04
50 m butterfly	Jiao Liuyang (CHN)	26.77	Fabíola Molina (BRA)	26.82	Liu Lan (CHN)	26.88
100 m butterfly	Jiao Liuyang (CHN)	57.78 CR	Liu Lan (CHN)	58.67	Dandara Antônio (BRA)	59.65
200 m butterfly	Jiao Liuyang (CHN)	2:09.57	Franziska Hentke (GER)	2:11.65	Liu Lan (CHN)	2:13.05
200 m individual medley	Li Jiaxing (CHN)	2:16.02	Katharina Schiller (GER)	2:16.05	Joanna Maranhão (BRA)	2:16.11
4 × 100 m freestyle relay	China; Liu Lan; Li Yang; Yu Yao; Liu Yiru	3:45.30 CR	Italy; Erika Ferraioli; Alice Carpanese; Martina de Memme; Flavia Zoccari	3:47.45	Brazil; Michelle Lenhardt; Julyana Kury; Joanna Maranhão; Monique Ferreira	3:49.08
4 × 100 m medley relay	China; Xu Tianlongzi; Zhang Hongtao; Jiao Liuyang; Liu Lan	4:07.13	Brazil; Fabíola Molina; Tatiane Sakemi; Dandara Antônio; Michelle Lenhardt	4:12.64	Italy; Valentina de Nardi; Veronica Demozzi; Laura Letrari; Erika Ferraioli	4:18.61

=== Medal table ===
Rank	Nation	Gold	Silver	Bronze	Total
1	China (CHN)	18	8	11	37
2	Brazil (BRA)	10	12	8	30
3	Italy (ITA)	6	7	8	21
4	Germany (GER)	2	8	2	12
5	Ukraine (UKR)	1	0	1	2
6	Greece (GRE)	0	1	3	4
7	Switzerland (SUI)	0	0	2	2
8	Kazakhstan (KAZ)	0	0	1	1
Totals (8 entries)		37	36	36	109
