= Swimming at the 2018 Mediterranean Games – Women's 4 × 100 metre medley relay =

Women's 4 × 100 metre medley relay at the 2018 Mediterranean Games
- Venue: Campclar Aquatic Center
- Location: Tarragona, Spain
- Dates: 25 June
- Competitors: 24 from 6 nations
- Winning time: 3:58.27

Medalists
gold medal	Margherita Panziera; Arianna Castiglioni; Elena Di Liddo; Erika Ferraioli	Italy
silver medal	Duane Da Rocha; Jessica Vall; Lidón Muñoz; Marta González	Spain
bronze medal	Theodora Drakou; Maria-Thaleia Drasidou; Anna Ntountounaki; Sofia Klikopoulou	Greece

The women's 4 × 100 metre medley relay event at the 2018 Mediterranean Games was held on 25 June 2018 at the Campclar Aquatic Center.

== Records ==
Prior to this competition, the existing world and Mediterranean Games records were as follows:

World record	United States	3:51.55	Budapest, Hungary	30 July 2017
Mediterranean Games record	Italy	4:04.57	Pescara, Italy	1 July 2009

The following records were established during the competition:

Date	Event	Nation	Swimmers	Time	Record
25 June	Final	Italy	Margherita Panziera	1:00.54	GR^{BK}
25 June	Final	Italy	Margherita Panziera (1:00.54); Arianna Castiglioni (1:06.14); Elena Di Liddo (57.05); Erika Ferraioli (54.54)	3:58.27	GR

BK – Backstroke lead-off leg

== Results ==
The final was held at 19:24.

Rank	Lane	Nation	Swimmers	Time	Notes
1st place, gold medalist(s)	7	Italy	Margherita Panziera (1:00.54) GR; Arianna Castiglioni (1:06.14); Elena Di Liddo (57.05); Erika Ferraioli (54.54)	3:58.27	GR, NR
2nd place, silver medalist(s)	3	Spain	Duane Da Rocha (1:01.31); Jessica Vall (1:07.03); Lidón Muñoz (1:00.17); Marta González (55.82)	4:04.33	
3rd place, bronze medalist(s)	6	Greece	Theodora Drakou (1:02.45); Maria-Thaleia Drasidou (1:11.20); Anna Ntountounaki (57.75); Sofia Klikopoulou (56.82)	4:08.22	
4	4	Turkey	Ekaterina Avramova (1:01.83); Gülşen Beste Samancı (1:10.48); Viktoriya Zeynep Güneş (1:00.25); Selen Özbilen (55.71)	4:08.27	
5	2	France	Camille Gheorghiu (1:03.93); Solène Gallego (1:10.69); Marie Wattel (59.28); Assia Touati (54.94)	4:08.84	
6	5	Portugal	Rita Frischknecht (1:04.41); Raquel Pereira (1:09.95); Ana Monteiro (1:01.16); Diana Durães (58.12)	4:13.64	NR
