= 2014 FINA World Swimming Championships (25 m) – Women's 4 × 100 metre freestyle relay =

Women's 4 × 100 metre freestyle relay at the 2014 FINA World Swimming Championships (25 m)
- Dates: 5 December
- Competitors: 64 from 16 nations
- Winning time: 3:26.53

Medalists
gold medal	Inge Dekker; Femke Heemskerk; Maud van der Meer; Ranomi Kromowidjojo	Netherlands
silver medal	Natalie Coughlin; Abbey Weitzeil; Madison Kennedy; Shannon Vreeland	United States
bronze medal	Erika Ferraioli; Silvia Di Pietro; Aglaia Pezzato; Federica Pellegrini	Italy

The women's 4 × 100 metre freestyle relay competition of the 2014 FINA World Swimming Championships (25 m) was held on 5 December.

== Records ==
Prior to the competition, the existing world and championship records were as follows.

	Nation	Time	Location	Date
World record	Netherlands	3:28.22	Amsterdam	19 December 2008
Championship record	Netherlands	3:28.54	Dubai	18 December 2010

The following records were established during the competition:

Date	Event	Nation	Time	Record
5 December	Final	Netherlands	3:26.53	WR

== Results ==
=== Heats ===
The heats were held at 13:33.

Rank	Heat	Lane	Nation	Swimmers	Time	Notes
1	1	4	United States	Natalie Coughlin (51.93); Amy Bilquist (53.05); Madison Kennedy (52.52); Amanda Weir (53.52)	3:31.02	Q
2	2	5	Denmark	Mie Nielsen (53.13); Julie Levisen (53.79); Pernille Blume (53.29); Jeanette Ottesen (52.74)	3:32.95	Q
3	2	6	Italy	Silvia Di Pietro (53.39); Erika Ferraioli (53.15); Alice Mizzau (54.29); Federica Pellegrini (52.82)	3:33.65	Q
4	1	5	China	Qiu Yuhan (53.24); Tang Yi (53.18); Shen Duo (53.47); Zhang Yufei (54.23)	3:34.12	Q
5	2	7	Brazil	Larissa Oliveira (53.48); Daynara de Paula (53.42); Daiane Oliveira (53.90); Alessandra Marchioro (53.71)	3:34.51	Q, SA
6	2	4	Japan	Miki Uchida (52.71); Yayoi Matsumoto (53.61); Tomomi Aoki (53.78); Rino Hosoda (54.53)	3:34.63	Q
7	2	0	Netherlands	Maud van der Meer (53.39); Esmee Vermeulen (53.63); Rieneke Terink (55.54); Femke Heemskerk (52.32)	3:34.88	Q
8	1	7	Germany	Anna Dietterle (54.60); Annika Bruhn (53.16); Marlene Huther (54.68); Daniela Schreiber (52.91)	3:35.35	Q
9	1	6	Austria	Lena Kreundl (54.34); Birgit Koschischek (53.75); Lisa Zaiser (54.18); Jördis Steinegger (54.59)	3:36.86	
10	2	1	Russia	Rozaliya Nasretdinova (54.24); Viktoriya Andreyeva (54.44); Arina Openysheva (54.29); Margarita Nesterova (54.01)	3:36.98	
11	2	2	South Africa	Lehesta Kemp (55.83); Erin Gallagher (54.31); Trudi Maree (55.18); Rene Warnes (57.04)	3:42.36	
12	2	8	Turkey	İlknur Nihan Çakıcı (56.59); Esra Kübra Kaçmaz (56.85); Sezin Eligul (56.85); Ekaterina Avramova (53.75)	3:44.04	
13	1	2	Macau	Tan Chi Yan (58.76); Lei On Kei (58.70); Long Chi Wai (1:00.07); Choi Weng Tong (1:00.70)	3:58.23	
14	1	8	India	Anusha Sanjeev Mehta (1:00.96); Malavika Vishwanath (1:00.00); Thalasha Satish Prabhu (59.50); Aditi Dhumatkar (58.12)	3:58.58	
15	1	3	Seychelles	Alexus Laird (56.78); Anisha Payet (1:06.22); Maria Marzocchi (1:07.92); Felicity Passon (56.93)	4:07.85	
16	1	1	Papua New Guinea	Savannah Tkatchenko (1:01.90); Shanice Paraka (1:03.50); Tegan McCarthy (1:04.60); Anna-Liza Mopio-Jane (58.36)	4:08.36	
—	2	3	Sweden		DNS	

=== Final ===
The final was held at 20:11.

Rank	Lane	Nation	Swimmers	Time	Notes
1st place, gold medalist(s)	1	Netherlands	Inge Dekker (52.39); Femke Heemskerk (50.58); Maud van der Meer (52.55); Ranomi Kromowidjojo (51.01)	3:26.53	WR
2nd place, silver medalist(s)	4	United States	Natalie Coughlin (52.25); Abbey Weitzeil (51.57); Madison Kennedy (51.82); Shannon Vreeland (52.06)	3:27.70	
3rd place, bronze medalist(s)	3	Italy	Erika Ferraioli (52.70); Silvia Di Pietro (52.30); Aglaia Pezzato (52.72); Federica Pellegrini (51.76)	3:29.48	
4	5	Denmark	Jeanette Ottesen (51.91); Julie Levisen (53.26); Mie Nielsen (52.03); Pernille Blume (52.66)	3:29.86	
5	6	China	Qiu Yuhan (53.28); Tang Yi (52.64); Shen Duo (52.29); Zhang Yufei (53.57)	3:31.78	
6	7	Japan	Miki Uchida (51.83); Yayoi Matsumoto (52.93); Tomomi Aoki (53.67); Rino Hosoda (53.88)	3:32.31	
7	2	Brazil	Larissa Oliveira (53.46); Daynara de Paula (53.88); Daiane Oliveira (53.03); Alessandra Marchioro (53.56)	3:33.93	SA
8	8	Germany	Anna Dietterle (54.13); Annika Bruhn (52.84); Marlene Huther (54.38); Daniela Schreiber (53.36)	3:34.71	
