= Maud van der Meer =

Dutch swimmer (born 1992)

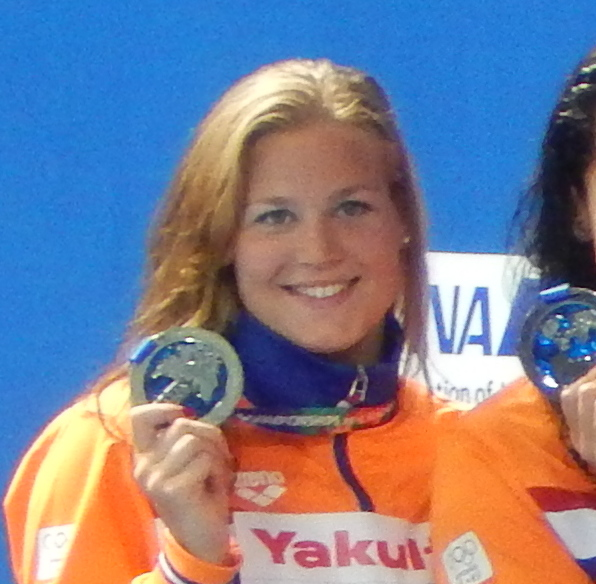

Personal information
- National team: Netherlands
- Born: 20 May 1992 (age 34) Uden
- Height: 1.80 m (5 ft 11 in)
- Weight: 64 kg (141 lb)

Sport
- Sport: Swimming
- Strokes: Freestyle, medley
Medal record
Women's swimming
Representing the Netherlands
World Championships (LC)
Gold medal – first place	2011 Shanghai	4×100 m freestyle
Silver medal – second place	2015 Kazan	4×100 m freestyle
Silver medal – second place	2017 Budapest	4x100 m mixed freestyle
Bronze medal – third place	2017 Budapest	4x100 m freestyle
World Championships (SC)
Gold medal – first place	2014 Doha	4×50 m freestyle
Gold medal – first place	2014 Doha	4×100 m freestyle
Silver medal – second place	2016 Windsor	4x50 m freestyle
Bronze medal – third place	2016 Windsor	4x100 m freestyle
European Championships (LC)
Gold medal – first place	2016 London	4×100 m freestyle
Gold medal – first place	2016 London	4×100 m mixed freestyle
Silver medal – second place	2014 Berlin	4×100 m freestyle

Maud van der Meer (born 20 May 1992) is a former Dutch competitive swimmer. She won the gold medal at the 2011 World Aquatics Championships in the 4 × 100 metre freestyle relay (she only competed in the heats) and the silver medal at the 2015 World Aquatics Championships in the 4 × 100 metre freestyle relay (together with Ranomi Kromowidjojo, Marrit Steenbergen and Femke Heemskerk).

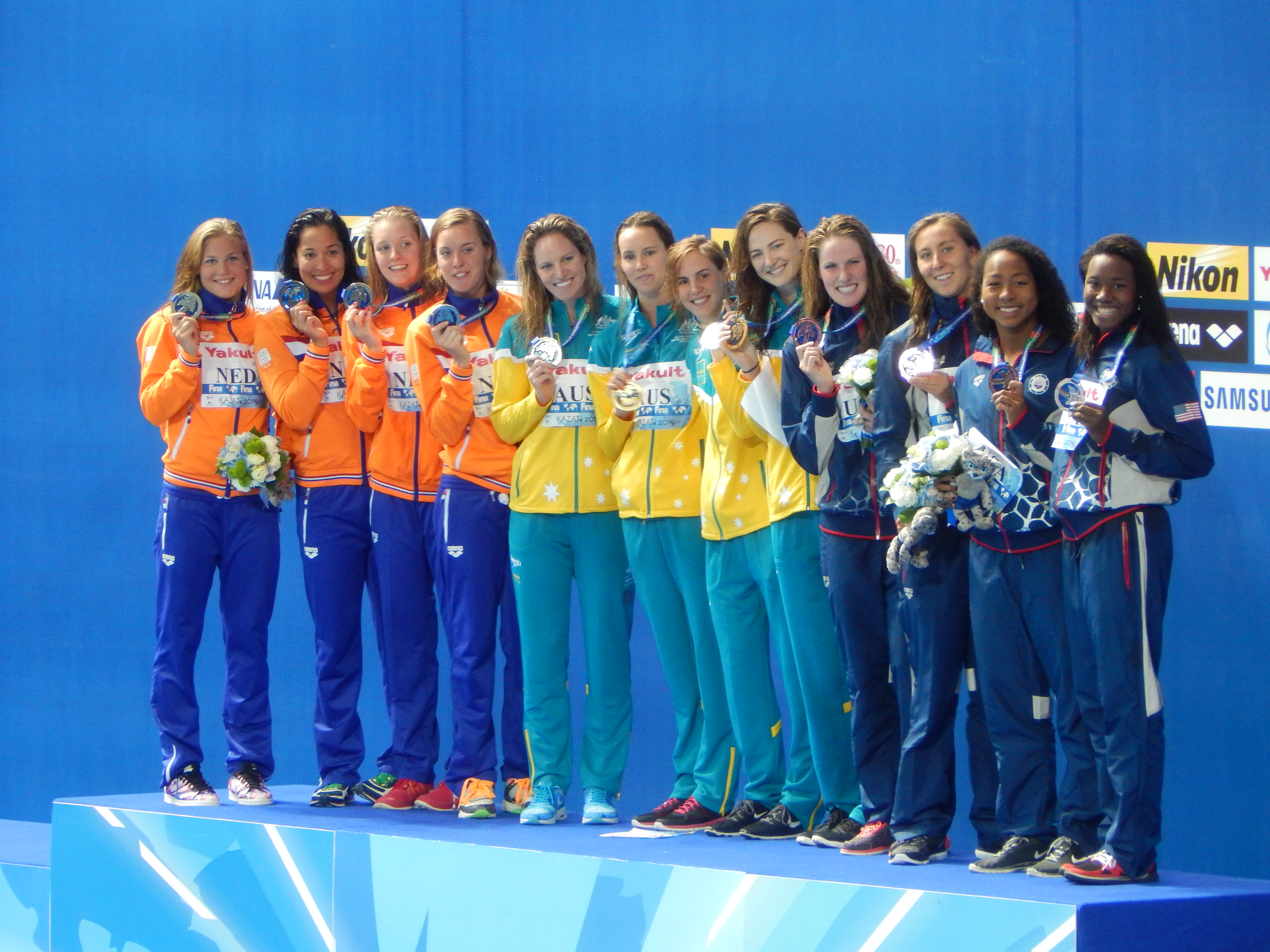
Kazan 2015 – Victory Ceremony 4×100 metres freestyle relay

At the 2016 Summer Olympics in Rio de Janeiro, Van der Meer competed in the heats of the 4 × 100 meter freestyle relay, where the team finished 5th and qualified for the final. In the final the Dutch team, without Van der Meer, went on to finish in 4th place.

In January 2021, at the age of 28, van der Meer announced her retirement from competitive swimming.
