= Swimming at the 2018 Mediterranean Games – Women's 4 × 100 metre freestyle relay =

Women's 4 × 100 metre freestyle relay at the 2018 Mediterranean Games
- Venue: Campclar Aquatic Center
- Location: Tarragona, Spain
- Dates: 24 June
- Competitors: 24 from 6 nations
- Winning time: 3:39.95

Medalists
gold medal	Giada Galizi; Laura Letrari; Paola Biagioli; Erika Ferraioli	Italy
silver medal	Marie Wattel; Léna Bousquin; Alizée Morel; Assia Touati	France
bronze medal	Marta González; Lidón Muñoz; Marta Cano; Melani Costa	Spain

The women's 4 × 100 metre freestyle relay event at the 2018 Mediterranean Games was held on 24 June 2018 at the Campclar Aquatic Center.

== Records ==
Prior to this competition, the existing world and Mediterranean Games records were as follows:

World record	Australia	3:30.05	Gold Coast, Australia	5 April 2018
Mediterranean Games record	Italy	3:40.63	Pescara, Italy	27 June 2009

The following records were established during the competition:

Date	Event	Nation	Swimmers	Time	Record
24 June	Final	Italy	Giada Galizi (55.57); Laura Letrari (55.13); Paola Biagioli (55.04); Erika Ferraioli (54.21)	3:39.95	GR

== Results ==
The final was held at 19:06.

Rank	Lane	Nation	Swimmers	Time	Notes
1st place, gold medalist(s)	4	Italy	Giada Galizi (55.57); Laura Letrari (55.13); Paola Biagioli (55.04); Erika Ferraioli (54.21)	3:39.95	GR
2nd place, silver medalist(s)	1	France	Marie Wattel (54.78); Léna Bousquin (55.63); Alizée Morel (55.76); Assia Touati (55.15)	3:41.32	
3rd place, bronze medalist(s)	3	Spain	Marta González (55.44); Lidón Muñoz (55.13); Marta Cano (56.07); Melani Costa (55.24)	3:41.88	
4	2	Greece	Sofia Klikopoulou (56.53); Vasiliki Baka (56.66); Anna Ntountounaki (56.19); Theodora Drakou (55.32)	3:44.70	
5	6	Turkey	Selen Özbilen (56.09); Viktoriya Zeynep Güneş (56.85); Sezin Eligül (56.64); Ekaterina Avramova (55.36)	3:44.94	NR
6	7	Portugal	Rita Frischknecht (57.90); Raquel Pereira (58.45); Inês Fernandes (59.26); Diana Durães (58.54)	3:54.15	
	5	Algeria		DNS	
