= Swimming at the 2018 Mediterranean Games – Women's 4 × 200 metre freestyle relay =

Women's 4 × 200 metre freestyle relay at the 2018 Mediterranean Games
- Venue: Campclar Aquatic Center
- Location: Tarragona, Spain
- Dates: 23 June
- Competitors: 32 from 8 nations
- Winning time: 8:02.63

Medalists
gold medal	Margherita Panziera; Linda Caponi; Stefania Pirozzi; Laura Letrari	Italy
silver medal	Alizée Morel; Assia Touati; Camille Gheorghiu; Marie Wattel	France
bronze medal	Melani Costa; África Zamorano; Lidón Muñoz; Marta Cano	Spain

The women's 4 × 200 metre freestyle relay event at the 2018 Mediterranean Games was held on 23 June 2018 at the Campclar Aquatic Center.

== Records ==
Prior to this competition, the existing world and Mediterranean Games records were as follows:

World record	China	7:42.08	Rome, Italy	30 July 2009
Mediterranean Games record	Italy	7:56.69	Pescara, Italy	30 June 2009

== Results ==
The final was held at 19:03.

Rank	Lane	Nation	Swimmers	Time	Notes
1st place, gold medalist(s)	2	Italy	Margherita Panziera (2:01.02); Linda Caponi (2:00.14); Stefania Pirozzi (2:01.09); Laura Letrari (2:00.38)	8:02.63	
2nd place, silver medalist(s)	3	France	Alizée Morel (2:02.16); Assia Touati (2:00.09); Camille Gheorghiu (2:01.06); Marie Wattel (1:59.74)	8:03.05	
3rd place, bronze medalist(s)	4	Spain	Melani Costa (2:00.23); África Zamorano (2:00.42); Lidón Muñoz (2:00.71); Marta Cano (2:03.17)	8:04.53	
4	1	Slovenia	Anja Klinar (2:00.45); Katja Fain (2:01.41); Neža Klančar (2:02.17); Sara Račnik (2:00.86)	8:04.89	
5	7	Portugal	Diana Durães (2:02.62); Rita Frischknecht (2:02.41); Ana Monteiro (2:03.57); Tamila Holub (2:04.82)	8:13.42	NR
6	5	Turkey	Beril Böcekler (2:04.74); Nida Eliz Üstündağ (2:05.80); Selen Özbilen (2:06.15); Ekaterina Avramova (2:04.91)	8:21.60	
7	8	Greece	Vasiliki Baka (2:04.33); Sofia Klikopoulou (2:07.35); Afroditi Katsiara (2:06.45); Ilektra Lebl (2:05.21)	8:23.34	
8	6	San Marino	Elisa Bernardi (2:08.06); Sara Lettoli (2:08.21); Beatrice Felici (2:13.12); Arianna Valloni (2:08.28)	8:37.67	
