= Niccolò Beni =

Italian swimmer

Personal information
- Born: July 9, 1986 (age 39)

Sport
- Sport: Swimming
- Strokes: Butterfly
Medal record
Representing Italy
Mediterranean Games
Bronze medal – third place	2009 Pescara	200m butterfly

Niccolò Beni (born 9 July 1986) is an Italian swimmer who competed in the 2008 Summer Olympics.
