= Sarah Bro =

Danish swimmer

Personal information
- Born: 4 March 1996 (age 30) Copenhagen, Denmark

Sport
- Sport: Swimming

Sarah Bro (born 4 March 1996) is a Danish swimmer. She competed in the women's 4 × 100 metre freestyle relay event at the 2016 Summer Olympics.
