= Marta Terry González =

Cuban librarian (1931–2018)

- Born: May 7, 1931; Cuba
- Died: June 18, 2018 (aged 87); Cuba
- Education: University of Havana
- Occupations: Librarian, Professor

Marta Terry González (May 7, 1931 – June 18, 2018) was a Cuban librarian. She is known for her leadership of several important libraries in post-revolutionary Cuba, including those of the Junta Central de Planificación (JUCEPLAN), Casa de las Américas, and the National Library José Martí, as well as her role in the International Federation of Library Associations and Institutions (IFLA). In these roles, she worked with well-known Cuban revolutionaries such as Che Guevara and Haydée Santamaría.

== Early life ==
As a child, Terry González helped her grandmother collect cigar butts after curfew so that her great-grandmother could smoke them in a pipe. She was homeschooled as a child due to her poor health. Her mother had died when she was young, so she was taught at home by her grandmother and her aunts, who worked as teachers. Several books left a strong early impression on her, including Corazón de Edmundo de Amicis and works by José Martí.

== Education ==
In 1948, Terry González entered the University of Havana to study philosophy and literature. Her thesis for her master's degree was on the impact of chattel slavery on White society. In 1953, she visited the United States, where she experienced racial segregation in a Maryland restaurant. She saw American racial discrimination as puzzling and different from the anti-Black discrimination in Cuba.

== Professional work ==
In 1961, Terry González was appointed to lead the library at JUCEPLAN, the body responsible for economic planning in Cuba.

In 1980, she was one of the first two Cuban librarians to attend an IFLA conference. Gonzalez was appointed National Librarian of Cuba and director of the José Martí National Library in 1987, serving in that capacity for ten years. By 1994, she had become vice-president of IFLA and was also vice-president of its Havana Organizing Committee. Marta was recognized by IFLA as an honorary fellow, which is the federation's highest honor.

Throughout her professional career, Terry González strove to ensure that libraries serve the general public, rather than an educated and moneyed elite.

She died in Cuba on June 18, 2018.
