= Femke Heemskerk =

Dutch swimmer (born 1987)

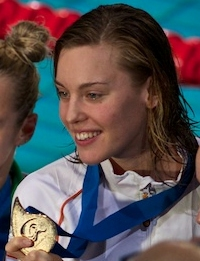
- Femke Heemskerk in 2010

Personal information
- Full name: Frederike Johanna Maria Heemskerk
- Nickname: "Femke"
- National team: Netherlands
- Born: 21 September 1987 (age 39) Roelofarendsveen, Netherlands
- Height: 1.80 m (5 ft 11 in)
- Weight: 68 kg (150 lb)
- Website: FemkeHeemskerk.nl

Sport
- Sport: Swimming
- Strokes: Freestyle, medley, backstroke
- Club: Energy Standard
- Coach: Philippe Lucas
Medal record
Women's swimming
Representing Netherlands
Event	1st	2nd	3rd
Olympic Games	1	1	0
World Championships (LC)	2	3	3
World Championships (SC)	7	8	3
European Championships (LC)	3	11	4
European Championships (SC)	5	5	4
Total	18	28	14
Olympic Games
Gold medal – first place	2008 Beijing	4×100 m freestyle
Silver medal – second place	2012 London	4×100 m freestyle
World Championships (LC)
Gold medal – first place	2009 Rome	4×100 m freestyle
Gold medal – first place	2011 Shanghai	4×100 m freestyle
Silver medal – second place	2015 Kazan	4×100 m freestyle
Silver medal – second place	2015 Kazan	4×100 m mixed freestyle
Silver medal – second place	2017 Budapest	4×100 m mixed freestyle
Bronze medal – third place	2007 Melbourne	4×100 m freestyle
Bronze medal – third place	2013 Barcelona	4×100 m freestyle
Bronze medal – third place	2017 Budapest	4×100 m freestyle
World Championships (SC)
Gold medal – first place	2008 Manchester	4×100 m freestyle
Gold medal – first place	2008 Manchester	4×200 m freestyle
Gold medal – first place	2010 Dubai	4×100 m freestyle
Gold medal – first place	2014 Doha	100 m freestyle
Gold medal – first place	2014 Doha	4×50 m freestyle
Gold medal – first place	2014 Doha	4×100 m freestyle
Gold medal – first place	2014 Doha	4×200 m freestyle
Silver medal – second place	2008 Manchester	200 m freestyle
Silver medal – second place	2010 Dubai	100 m freestyle
Silver medal – second place	2018 Hangzhou	50 m freestyle
Silver medal – second place	2018 Hangzhou	100 m freestyle
Silver medal – second place	2018 Hangzhou	4×50 m freestyle
Silver medal – second place	2018 Hangzhou	4×100 m freestyle
Silver medal – second place	2018 Hangzhou	4×50 m mixed freestyle
Silver medal – second place	2018 Hangzhou	4×50 m mixed medley
Bronze medal – third place	2014 Doha	200 m freestyle
Bronze medal – third place	2018 Hangzhou	200 m freestyle
Bronze medal – third place	2018 Hangzhou	4×50 m medley
European Championships (LC)
Gold medal – first place	2008 Eindhoven	4×100 m freestyle
Gold medal – first place	2016 London	4×100 m freestyle
Gold medal – first place	2020 Budapest	100 m freestyle
Silver medal – second place	2014 Berlin	100 m freestyle
Silver medal – second place	2014 Berlin	4×100 m freestyle
Silver medal – second place	2014 Berlin	4×100 m mixed medley
Silver medal – second place	2016 London	200 m freestyle
Silver medal – second place	2018 Glasgow	100 m freestyle
Silver medal – second place	2018 Glasgow	200 m freestyle
Silver medal – second place	2018 Glasgow	4×100 m freestyle
Silver medal – second place	2018 Glasgow	4×100 m mixed freestyle
Silver medal – second place	2020 Budapest	4×100 m freestyle
Silver medal – second place	2020 Budapest	4×100 m mixed medley
Silver medal – second place	2020 Budapest	4×100 m mixed freestyle
Bronze medal – third place	2010 Budapest	100 m freestyle
Bronze medal – third place	2014 Berlin	200 m freestyle
Bronze medal – third place	2016 London	100 m freestyle
Bronze medal – third place	2016 London	4×200 m freestyle
European Championships (SC)
Gold medal – first place	2010 Eindhoven	200 m freestyle
Gold medal – first place	2010 Eindhoven	4×50 m freestyle
Gold medal – first place	2017 Copenhagen	4×50 m freestyle
Gold medal – first place	2017 Copenhagen	4×50 m freestyle mixed
Gold medal – first place	2019 Glasgow	4×50 m freestyle
Silver medal – second place	2008 Rijeka	200 m freestyle
Silver medal – second place	2010 Eindhoven	100 m freestyle
Silver medal – second place	2015 Netanya	4×50 m freestyle
Silver medal – second place	2017 Copenhagen	200 m freestyle
Silver medal – second place	2019 Glasgow	4×50 m mixed medley
Bronze medal – third place	2009 Istanbul	200 m freestyle
Bronze medal – third place	2015 Netanya	200 m freestyle
Bronze medal – third place	2019 Glasgow	100 m freestyle
Bronze medal – third place	2019 Glasgow	200 m freestyle

Frederike Johanna Maria "Femke" Heemskerk (pronounced [freːdəˈrikə joːˈɦɑnaː maːˈrijaː ˈfɛmkə ˈɦeːmskɛr(ə)k]; born 21 September 1987) is a former Dutch competitive swimmer who mainly specializes in freestyle, but also has a strong backstroke and medley.

As part of the Dutch team, she holds the short course world record in the 4 × 50 m freestyle relay and formerly the 4 × 100 m freestyle relay, and 4×200 m freestyle relay, all set at the World Championships in Doha in 2014. Individually, she has broken national records in six events, four in long course, 100 m and 200 m freestyle, 100 m backstroke, and 200 m individual medley, and two in short course, 200 m freestyle and 200 m individual medley. She represented Energy Standard in the International Swimming League.

== Swimming career ==
=== Early career ===
Femke Heemskerk made her international debut at the World LC Championships 2005 in Montreal as a relay-swimmer. She only swum in the heats of the 4×100 m freestyle and the 4×200 m freestyle events. She competed in the European LC Championships 2006 and the European Short Course Swimming Championships. But individually she did not advance past the heats in both events.

At the World LC Championships 2007 she won a bronze medal in the 4×100 m freestyle together with Inge Dekker, Ranomi Kromowidjojo and Marleen Veldhuis. At the 2007 European Short Course Swimming Championships in Debrecen she surprisingly finished 6th in her first international final, the 100 m freestyle. She also finished 10th in the 200 m freestyle.

=== Spring 2008 ===
In 2008 she swam at the 2008 European Aquatics Championships on the world record breaking 4 × 100 m freestyle team, which also won bronze in the World Championships the year before. With the same team she ended fourth in the 4 × 200 m freestyle relay. Individually she did not reach the semi-finals. The next month she competed in Manchester at the World SC Championships 2008 where she again broke two relay records in the 4×200 m freestyle with the same team as in Eindhoven. In the 4×100 m freestyle Hinkelien Schreuder replaced Ranomi Kromowidjojo who suffered from an elbow injury. She won her first individual medal, a silver medal, in the 200 m freestyle at the last day of the tournament. During the National Championships in June 2008, Heemskerk lowered three national records on the long course, 200 m freestyle, 200 m individual medley and 100 m backstroke.

=== 2008 Summer Olympics ===
At the 2008 Summer Olympics in Beijing she won a gold medal with the 4×100 m freestyle relay. She did so alongside Inge Dekker, Ranomi Kromowidjojo and Marleen Veldhuis in a time of 3:33.76, just 0.14 outside their own world record. The day after she competed individually in the 200 m individual medley where she finished 28th during the heats. Heemskerk was the lead-off swimmer in both 4×200 m freestyle and 4×100 m medley relays, both of which did not qualify for the finals.

=== Fall 2008 ===
After the Olympics Heemskerk returned to competition at the 2008 European Aquatics Championships where she qualified for the 2009 World Aquatics Championships in the 100 m and 200 m freestyle. The week afterwards she participated in the 2008 European Short Course Swimming Championships in Rijeka, Croatia. There she won a silver medal in the 200 m freestyle behind Federica Pellegrini. She also finished fifth in the 100 m medley. At the end of 2008 she became Amsterdam Sportswoman of the year

=== 2011 ===
In 2011 Heemskerk won a gold medal at the 2011 World Aquatics Championships as part of the 4 × 100 m freestyle relay alongside Inge Dekker, Ranomi Kromowidjojo and Marleen Veldhuis in a time of 3:33.96. She anchored the team with a split time of 52.46, the fastest split in the final by 0.53.

=== 2012 ===
==== London Olympics ====
At the 2012 Summer Olympics in London, Heemskerk and her teammates – Ranomi Kromowidjojo, Inge Dekker, Marleen Veldhuis, and Hinkelien Schreuder – won a silver medal in the 4 × 100 m freestyle relay, an event in which they were the defending champions. The gold medal went to Australia.

=== 2014 ===
Heemskerk won her first individual world title at the 2014 world short course championships in Doha, Qatar, in the 100 m freestyle, ahead of Sarah Sjöström and Kromowidjojo. She won three more gold medals in the freestyle relays. In the 4 × 100 m freestyle relay, she swam a split time of 50.58 s, the only split under 51 seconds in the field.

=== 2015 ===
After finishing outside the medals in her individual events (the 100 and 200 meter freestyle) at the 2015 World Aquatics Championships in Kazan, Heemskerk decided to move to France to train with coach Philippe Lucas.

=== 2016 Olympics ===
Heemskerk qualified for the 2016 Summer Olympics in Rio de Janeiro, her third Olympics, in the 100 and 200 meter freestyle and the 4 × 100 and 4 × 200 meter freestyle relays. With the 4 × 100 meter freestyle relay she finished 4th in the final, after having medalled in the past two Olympics. In the 200 meter freestyle, she finished 16th in the semifinals.

=== 2017 ===
3-5 March 2017 Heemskerk competed in Swim Cup The Hague where she won the 200 m freestyle with a time of 1:56.59, came second in the 100 m freestyle (time 54.19), and came third in the 50 m freestyle with a time of 25.29.

Heemskerk competed in KZNB Challenger in Dordrecht, the Netherlands, on 18 and 19 March 2017. She finished first in 100 m freestyle with a time of 54.27.

Heemskerk took part in the Swim Cup Eindhoven, the Dutch Championships and also qualification competitions for the 2017 World Aquatics Championships in Budapest on 14–17 July 2017. In the Swim Cup Eindhoven, Heemskerk won the 200 m freestyle event with a time of 1:56.62, securing a place for Budapest. Silver and bronze medals went to Isabel Gose and Robin Neumann who were at least 2.5 seconds slower than Heemskerk. In the 100 m freestyle event Heemskerk reached the finals and finished second with a time of 53.77, securing qualification for the Budapest championships.

=== International Swimming League ===
In the Autumn of 2019 she was member of the inaugural International Swimming League swimming for the Energy Standard International Swim Club, who won the team title in Las Vegas, Nevada, in December.

== Personal bests ==
Short course
Event	Time	Date	Location
50 m freestyle	23.67	2018-10-04	Budapest, Hungary
100 m freestyle	51.29	2018-12-16	Hangzhou, People's Republic of China
200 m freestyle	1:51.69	2014-12-07	Doha, Qatar
100 m backstroke	57.72	2010-10-31	Berlin, Germany
200 m backstroke	2:03.51	2014-11-09	Tilburg, Netherlands
100 m individual medley	58.69	2018-09-28	Eindhoven, Netherlands
200 m individual medley	2:06.69	2014-11-21	Brønshøj, Denmark

Long course
Event	Time	Date	Location
50 m freestyle	24.28	2021-04-09	Eindhoven, Netherlands
100 m freestyle	52.69	2015-04-05	Eindhoven, Netherlands
200 m freestyle	1:54.68	2015-04-03	Eindhoven, Netherlands
100 m backstroke	1:00.03	2011-03-11	Amsterdam, Netherlands
200 m individual medley	2:10.21	2014-04-10	Eindhoven, Netherlands
