= Aglaia Pezzato =

Italian swimmer (born 1994)

Personal information
- Nationality: Italian
- Born: 22 April 1994 (age 32)

Sport
- Sport: Swimming
Medal record
World Championships (SC)
Silver medal – second place	2016 Windsor	4x100 m freestyle
Bronze medal – third place	2014 Doha	4x100 m freestyle
Bronze medal – third place	2016 Windsor	4x50 m freestyle
European Championships (SC)
Gold medal – first place	2015 Netanya	4x50 m freestyle

Aglaia Mafalda Pezzato (born 22 April 1994) is an Italian swimmer.

She competed at the 2016 Summer Olympics in Rio de Janeiro.
