= Lidón Muñoz =

Spanish swimmer (born 1995)

Personal information
- Full name: Lidón Muñoz del Campo
- Nationality: Spanish
- Born: 3 December 1995 (age 30) Castellón de la Plana, Spain

Sport
- Sport: Swimming
Medal record
Women's swimming
Representing Spain
Mediterranean Games
Gold medal – first place	2022 Oran	50 m freestyle
Silver medal – second place	2018 Tarragona	50 m freestyle
Silver medal – second place	2018 Tarragona	100 m freestyle
Silver medal – second place	2018 Tarragona	4×100 m medley
Silver medal – second place	2022 Oran	4×100 m medley
Bronze medal – third place	2018 Tarragona	4×100 m freestyle
Bronze medal – third place	2018 Tarragona	4×200 m freestyle

Lidón Muñoz del Campo (born 3 December 1995) is a Spanish swimmer and physician. She competed in the women's 50 metre freestyle at the 2019 World Aquatics Championships held in Gwangju, South Korea. She graduated in Medicine from the Autonomous University of Barcelona and currently works as an assistant physician specializing in gastroenterology at the Germans Trias i Pujol University Hospital in Badalona.

== See also ==
- List of Spanish records in swimming
