= Giada Galizi =

Italian swimmer (born 1993)

Personal information
- Born: 20 July 1993 (age 32) Rome, Italy

Sport
- Sport: Swimming
- Club: Fiamme Oro; Aurelia Nuoto Unicusano
Medal record
Representing Italy
European Championships (LC)
Gold medal – first place	2014 Berlin	4×100 m mixed freestyle
Bronze medal – third place	2014 Berlin	4×100 m freestyle
Mediterranean Games
Gold medal – first place	2018 Tarragona	4×100 m freestyle

Giada Galizi (born 20 July 1993) is an Italian freestyle swimmer. She was part of the freestyle 4×100 m teams that won a gold and a bronze medal at the 2014 European Aquatics Championships. Her mixed relay team set a European record in the process.
