= Marta González (swimmer) =

Spanish swimmer

Personal information
- Full name: Marta González Crivillers
- Nationality: Spanish
- Born: 9 April 1995 (age 31) Vic, Osona, Catalonia, Spain

Sport
- Sport: Swimming
Medal record
Women's swimming
Representing Spain
Mediterranean Games
| Silver medal – second place | 2018 Tarragona | 4×100 m medley |
| Bronze medal – third place | 2018 Tarragona | 4×100 m freestyle |

Marta González Crivillers (born 9 April 1995) is a Spanish swimmer. She competed in the women's 4 × 100 metre freestyle relay event at the 2016 Summer Olympics.
