= Assia Touati =

French swimmer (born 1995)

Personal information
- Nationality: French
- Born: 23 April 1995 (age 31)

Sport
- Sport: Swimming
- Strokes: Freestyle
Medal record
Women's swimming
Representing France
European Championships (LC)
Gold medal – first place	2018 Glasgow	4×100 m freestyle
Bronze medal – third place	2020 Budapest	4×100 m freestyle
Mediterranean Games
Silver medal – second place	2018 Tarragona	4×100 m freestyle
Silver medal – second place	2018 Tarragona	4×200 m freestyle
Silver medal – second place	2022 Oran	4×100 m freestyle

Assia Touati (born 23 April 1995) is a French swimmer.

She competed in the 4 × 100 m freestyle relay event at the 2018 European Aquatics Championships, winning the gold medal.
