= Margarita Nesterova =

Russian swimmer

Medal record

Women's swimming

Representing Russia

World Championships (SC)
Silver medal – second place	2014 Doha	4×50 m mixed free

European Championships (LC)
Silver medal – second place	2014 Berlin	4×100 m mixed free

European Championships (SC)
Silver medal – second place	2011 Szczecin	4×50 m medley

Summer Universiade
Bronze medal – third place	2015 Gwangju	4×100 m freestyle

Margarita Nesterova (born 20 September 1989, Dushanbe) is a Russian swimmer. At the 2012 Summer Olympics, she competed for the national team in the Women's 4 x 100 metre freestyle relay, finishing in 10th place in the heats, failing to reach the final.
