= Ranomi Kromowidjojo =

Dutch swimmer

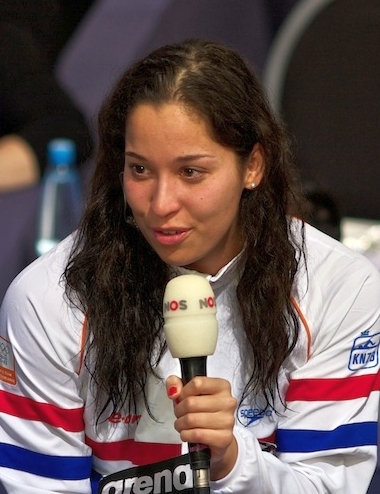
- Kromowidjojo in 2010

Personal information
- National team: Netherlands
- Born: 20 August 1990 (age 36) Sauwerd, Netherlands
- Height: 1.80 m (5 ft 11 in)
- Weight: 67 kg (148 lb)
- Spouse: Ferry Weertman
- Website: Ranomi.nl

Sport
- Sport: Swimming
- Strokes: Freestyle, butterfly
- Club: PSV and Team Iron (ISL)
Medal record
Women's swimming
Representing Netherlands
| Event | 1st | 2nd | 3rd |
|---|---|---|---|
| Olympic Games | 3 | 1 | 0 |
| World Championships (LC) | 3 | 8 | 6 |
| World Championships (SC) | 14 | 9 | 5 |
| European Championships (LC) | 6 | 7 | 1 |
| European Championships (SC) | 18 | 5 | 3 |
| Total | 44 | 30 | 15 |
Olympic Games
| Gold medal – first place | 2008 Beijing | 4×100 m freestyle |
| Gold medal – first place | 2012 London | 50 m freestyle |
| Gold medal – first place | 2012 London | 100 m freestyle |
| Silver medal – second place | 2012 London | 4×100 m freestyle |
World Championships (LC)
| Gold medal – first place | 2009 Rome | 4×100 m freestyle |
| Gold medal – first place | 2011 Shanghai | 4×100 m freestyle |
| Gold medal – first place | 2013 Barcelona | 50 m freestyle |
| Silver medal – second place | 2011 Shanghai | 50 m freestyle |
| Silver medal – second place | 2015 Kazan | 50 m freestyle |
| Silver medal – second place | 2015 Kazan | 4×100 m freestyle |
| Silver medal – second place | 2015 Kazan | 4×100 m mixed freestyle |
| Silver medal – second place | 2017 Budapest | 50 m freestyle |
| Silver medal – second place | 2017 Budapest | 50 m butterfly |
| Silver medal – second place | 2017 Budapest | 4×100 m mixed freestyle |
| Silver medal – second place | 2019 Gwangju | 50 m butterfly |
| Bronze medal – third place | 2007 Melbourne | 4×100 m freestyle |
| Bronze medal – third place | 2011 Shanghai | 100 m freestyle |
| Bronze medal – third place | 2013 Barcelona | 100 m freestyle |
| Bronze medal – third place | 2013 Barcelona | 50 m butterfly |
| Bronze medal – third place | 2013 Barcelona | 4×100 m freestyle |
| Bronze medal – third place | 2017 Budapest | 4×100 m freestyle |
World Championships (SC)
| Gold medal – first place | 2008 Manchester | 4×200 m freestyle |
| Gold medal – first place | 2010 Dubai | 50 m freestyle |
| Gold medal – first place | 2010 Dubai | 100 m freestyle |
| Gold medal – first place | 2010 Dubai | 4×100 m freestyle |
| Gold medal – first place | 2014 Doha | 50 m freestyle |
| Gold medal – first place | 2014 Doha | 4×50 m freestyle |
| Gold medal – first place | 2014 Doha | 4×100 m freestyle |
| Gold medal – first place | 2014 Doha | 4×200 m freestyle |
| Gold medal – first place | 2016 Windsor | 50 m freestyle |
| Gold medal – first place | 2018 Hangzhou | 50 m freestyle |
| Gold medal – first place | 2018 Hangzhou | 100 m freestyle |
| Gold medal – first place | 2018 Hangzhou | 50 m butterfly |
| Gold medal – first place | 2021 Abu Dhabi | 4×50 m mixed medley |
| Gold medal – first place | 2021 Abu Dhabi | 50 m butterfly |
| Silver medal – second place | 2016 Windsor | 100 m freestyle |
| Silver medal – second place | 2016 Windsor | 4×50 m freestyle |
| Silver medal – second place | 2016 Windsor | 4×50 m mixed freestyle |
| Silver medal – second place | 2018 Hangzhou | 4×50 m freestyle |
| Silver medal – second place | 2018 Hangzhou | 4×100 m freestyle |
| Silver medal – second place | 2018 Hangzhou | 4×50 m mixed freestyle |
| Silver medal – second place | 2018 Hangzhou | 4×50 m mixed medley |
| Silver medal – second place | 2021 Abu Dhabi | 4×50 m mixed freestyle |
| Silver medal – second place | 2021 Abu Dhabi | 50 m freestyle |
| Bronze medal – third place | 2014 Doha | 100 m freestyle |
| Bronze medal – third place | 2016 Windsor | 4×100 m freestyle |
| Bronze medal – third place | 2018 Hangzhou | 4×50 m medley |
| Bronze medal – third place | 2021 Abu Dhabi | 4×50 m medley |
| Bronze medal – third place | 2021 Abu Dhabi | 4×50 m freestyle |
European Championships (LC)
| Gold medal – first place | 2008 Eindhoven | 4×100 m freestyle |
| Gold medal – first place | 2016 London | 50 m freestyle |
| Gold medal – first place | 2016 London | 4×100 m freestyle |
| Gold medal – first place | 2016 London | 4×100 m mixed freestyle |
| Gold medal – first place | 2020 Budapest | 50 m freestyle |
| Gold medal – first place | 2020 Budapest | 50 m butterfly |
| Silver medal – second place | 2006 Budapest | 4×100 m freestyle |
| Silver medal – second place | 2016 London | 100 m freestyle |
| Silver medal – second place | 2018 Glasgow | 4x100 m freestyle |
| Silver medal – second place | 2018 Glasgow | 4×100 m mixed freestyle |
| Silver medal – second place | 2020 Budapest | 4×100 m freestyle |
| Silver medal – second place | 2020 Budapest | 4×100 m mixed freestyle |
| Silver medal – second place | 2020 Budapest | 4×100 m mixed medley |
| Bronze medal – third place | 2018 Glasgow | 50 m freestyle |
European Championships (SC)
| Gold medal – first place | 2007 Debrecen | 4×50 m freestyle |
| Gold medal – first place | 2008 Rijeka | 4×50 m freestyle |
| Gold medal – first place | 2008 Rijeka | 4×50 m medley |
| Gold medal – first place | 2009 Istanbul | 4×50 m freestyle |
| Gold medal – first place | 2009 Istanbul | 4×50 m medley |
| Gold medal – first place | 2010 Eindhoven | 50 m freestyle |
| Gold medal – first place | 2010 Eindhoven | 100 m freestyle |
| Gold medal – first place | 2010 Eindhoven | 4×50 m freestyle |
| Gold medal – first place | 2010 Eindhoven | 4×50 m medley |
| Gold medal – first place | 2013 Herning | 50 m freestyle |
| Gold medal – first place | 2013 Herning | 100 m freestyle |
| Gold medal – first place | 2015 Netanya | 50 m freestyle |
| Gold medal – first place | 2015 Netanya | 4×50 m medley |
| Gold medal – first place | 2017 Copenhagen | 100 m freestyle |
| Gold medal – first place | 2017 Copenhagen | 50 m butterfly |
| Gold medal – first place | 2017 Copenhagen | 4×50 m freestyle |
| Gold medal – first place | 2017 Copenhagen | 4×50 m mixed freestyle |
| Gold medal – first place | 2017 Copenhagen | 4×50 m mixed medley |
| Silver medal – second place | 2009 Istanbul | 50 m freestyle |
| Silver medal – second place | 2009 Istanbul | 100 m freestyle |
| Silver medal – second place | 2015 Netanya | 100 m freestyle |
| Silver medal – second place | 2015 Netanya | 4×50 m freestyle |
| Silver medal – second place | 2017 Copenhagen | 50 m freestyle |
| Bronze medal – third place | 2008 Rijeka | 100 m freestyle |
| Bronze medal – third place | 2013 Herning | 4×50 m mixed freestyle |
| Bronze medal – third place | 2015 Netanya | 4×50 m mixed freestyle |

Ranomi Kromowidjojo (Dutch pronunciation: [raːˈnoːmi kroːmoːʋiˈdʑoːjoː]; born 20 August 1990) is a retired Dutch swimmer of mixed Dutch-Javanese Surinamese origin who mainly specialises in sprint freestyle events. She is a triple Olympic champion, winning the gold medal in the 4 × 100 m freestyle relay at the 2008 Olympics, and in the 50 m freestyle and 100 m freestyle at the 2012 Olympics. Kromowidjojo holds the world record as part of the Dutch team in the 4×50 m freestyle relay (short course). She formerly held world records in the 50 meter freestyle, and the 4 × 100 m and 4 × 200 m freestyle relays (all short course). She has won a total of 45 medals in FINA World Championship events.

== Swimming career ==
=== Juniors ===
Kromowidjojo won a total of three medals at the European Junior Swimming Championships in 2005 and 2006, in the 50 meter freestyle and butterfly events.

=== 2006 ===
Kromowidjojo made her international senior debut at the European LC Championships 2006 in Budapest, Hungary. She won her first international senior medal in the 4 × 100 m freestyle relay, alongside Inge Dekker, Chantal Groot and Marleen Veldhuis, at the age of 15.

=== 2007 ===
Kromowidjojo qualified for her first World Championships in 2007. At the World LC Championships 2007 in Melbourne, Australia, she won a bronze medal in the 4×100 freestyle relay together with Inge Dekker, Femke Heemskerk and Marleen Veldhuis. Individually, she finished 13th in the 100 meter freestyle. At the end of 2007 she swam the A-qualification standard for the 2008 Summer Olympics in the 50 m and 100 m freestyle and swam the world record in the 4 × 100 m freestyle Short course, with Hinkelien Schreuder, Femke Heemskerk and Marleen Veldhuis, at the Dutch Open Swim Cup. In the week afterwards she competed in the European Short Course Swimming Championships 2007 in Debrecen, Hungary. There she swam another world record in the 4 × 50 m freestyle short course with Hinkelien Schreuder, Inge Dekker and Marleen Veldhuis.

=== 2008 ===
==== Spring ====
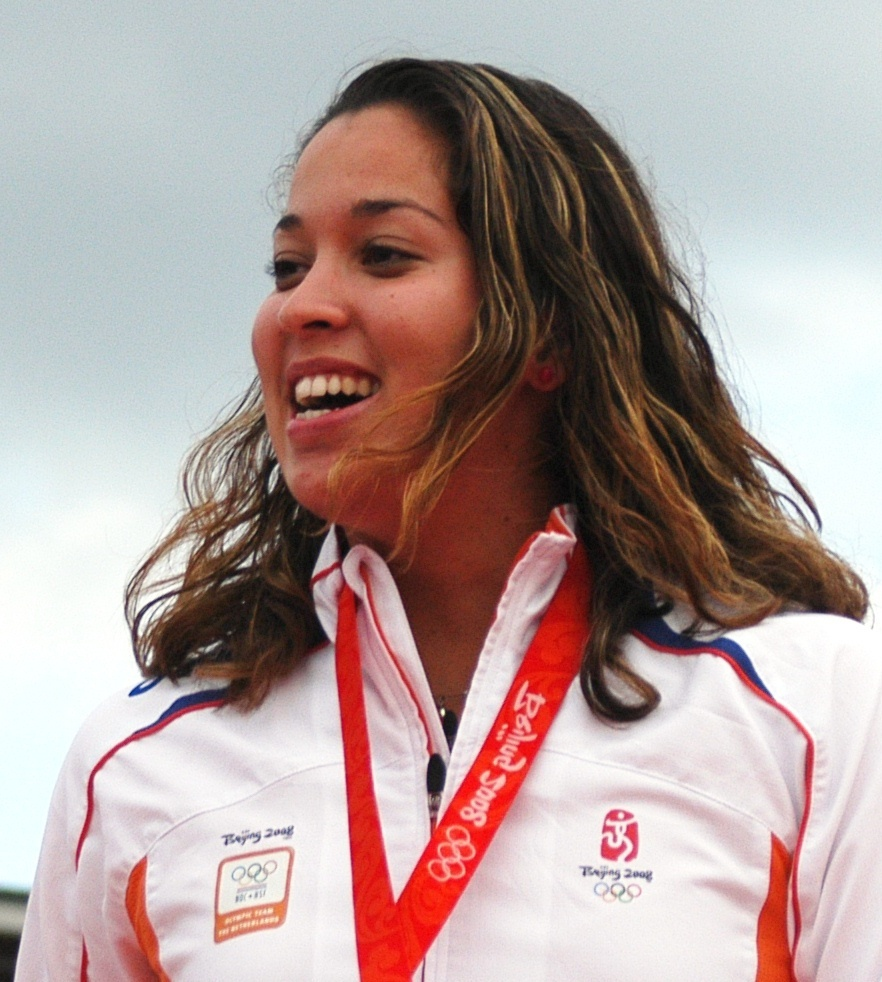
Ranomi Kromowidjojo back in Amsterdam, after the 2008 Olympics.

Kromowidjojo's first major tournament in 2008 was the 2008 European Aquatics Championships in Eindhoven. In the 4 × 100 m freestyle, she won the gold medal and with the team: Inge Dekker, Femke Heemskerk and Marleen Veldhuis. They broke the world record with a time of 3:33.62. With the same team she finished fourth in the 4 × 200 m freestyle. Individually she finished 9th in the 200 m freestyle. A few weeks later at the 2008 FINA Short Course World Championships in Manchester she won the world title in the 4 × 200 m freestyle relay and broke another world record, again with Dekker, Heemskerk and Veldhuis. After the 100 m freestyle heats she withdrew from the tournament with an elbow injury.

==== Beijing Olympics ====
At the 2008 Summer Olympics in Beijing and a few days before her 18th birthday, Kromowidjojo became an Olympic champion by winning the gold medal in the 4 × 100 m freestyle, again alongside Inge Dekker, Femke Heemskerk and Marleen Veldhuis. Their time was 3:33.76; just outside their own world record. The day after she started individually in the 200 m freestyle ending 23rd in the heats. She was also part of both the 4 × 200 m freestyle and 4 × 100 m medley relay teams, which failed to qualify for the respective finals.

==== Autumn ====
At the end of the year, Kromowidjojo took part in several championships. She started with the Swim Cup Eindhoven 2008, where she broke the national record in the 50 m backstroke long course, her first individual national record, and qualified for the 2009 World Aquatics Championships in the 100 m freestyle. One week afterwards she took part in the European Short Course Swimming Championships 2008 in Rijeka, Croatia. She won two gold medals, in the 4×50 m freestyle and 4×50 m medley relay, and a bronze medal in the 100 m freestyle behind Marleen Veldhuis and Jeanette Ottesen. She also became sixth in the 50 m backstroke.

=== 2009 ===
On 26 July 2009 at the World LC Championships 2009 in Rome, Italy, she won gold in the 4×100 freestyle relay with Inge Dekker, Femke Heemskerk and Marleen Veldhuis, setting a new world record (3:31.72).

=== 2010 ===
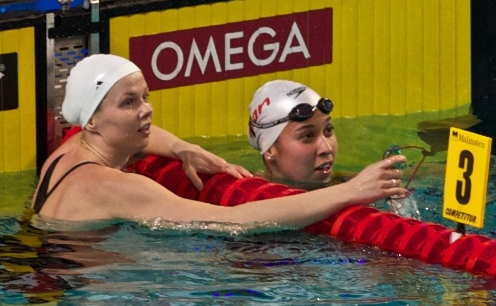
Ranomi Kromowidjojo (right) and Britta Steffen (left) during the European short course championships 2010 in Eindhoven, Netherlands.

In 2010 Kromowidjojo took part in the 2010 FINA World Swimming Championships (25 m) winning individual gold medals in both the 50m freestyle and the 100m freestyle, setting a championship record of 51.45. She also won a gold medal as part of the 4 × 100 m freestyle relay team alongside Inge Dekker, Femke Heemskerk and Hinkelien Schreuder with another championship record of 3:28.54.

=== 2011 ===
In 2011 Kromowidjojo won a gold medal at the 2011 World Aquatics Championships as part of the 4 × 100 m freestyle relay team alongside Inge Dekker, Marleen Veldhuis and Femke Heemskerk in a time of 3:33.96, 2.24 seconds above their own world record. Individually she won a bronze medal in the 100m freestyle with a time of 53.66 behind Jeanette Ottesen and Aleksandra Gerasimenya who tied for first in 53.45.

=== 2012 ===
At the 2012 Summer Olympics in London, Kromowidjojo and her teammates started the meet with a silver medal in the 4 × 100 m freestyle relay, an event in which they were the defending champions. The gold medal went to Australia.

Later during the week, Kromowidjojo set an Olympic record of 53.05 s in the semifinals of the 100 m freestyle. The next day in the final she followed this up by winning a gold medal in a new Olympic record of 53.00 seconds, ahead of reigning world champion Aleksandra Gerasimenya and Tang Yi. In the 50 m freestyle she qualified fastest for the final with a personal record of 24.07 seconds. In the final she completed the sprint double by winning a gold medal in a new Olympic record of 24.05 seconds, again beating Gerasimenya, as well as training partner and compatriot Marleen Veldhuis. Kromowidjojo was honoured for her performances in the 2012 Holland Heineken House in London.

By winning the 50 m and 100 m freestyle, Kromowidjojo followed in the footsteps of compatriot Inge de Bruijn, who won both events at the 2000 Olympics in Sydney. The European Swimming Federation named Kromowidjojo female European swimmer of the year 2012.

=== 2013 ===
At the 2013 World Aquatics Championships in Barcelona, Kromowidjojo won the gold medal in the 50 m freestyle. This was her first individual long course world title. She also won three bronze medals, in the 100 m freestyle, 50 m butterfly, and 4 × 100 m freestyle relay.

=== 2015 ===
She lost her world title in the 50 meter freestyle to Bronte Campbell of Australia, winning the silver medal 0.10 s behind. She won two more silver medals in relays.

=== 2016 ===
Kromowidjojo qualified for the 2016 Summer Olympics in Rio de Janeiro, her third Olympics, in the 50 and 100 meter freestyle and the 4 × 100 meter freestyle relay. In the relay, the Dutch team finished 4th, the first time they finished outside the medals since the 1996 Olympics. In the 100 m freestyle, Kromowidjojo finished 5th, 0.09 seconds behind the third-place finisher. In the 50 m freestyle she finished 6th, 0.12 seconds behind gold medalist Pernille Blume.

=== 2017 ===
Kromowidjojo competed in the Swim Cup Eindhoven (Dutch Championships) in April 2017 in the 100 m freestyle and won gold with a time of 53.72, also qualifying for Budapest World Championships. The race was very close and in the first 50 m Femke Heemskerk had the lead but in the second 50 m Kromowidjojo overtook her and finished first.

=== 2019 ===
She represented the Netherlands at the 2019 World Aquatics Championships and won the silver medal in the women's 50 metre butterfly event.

==== International Swimming League ====
In 2019 she was member of the 2019 International Swimming League representing Team Iron. She had a perfect record of winning all the skin races at each match the team competed in. She also won the 50 freestyle in Budapest and came third in the 100 freestyle. In Lewisville she picked up two second places in the 50 and 100 freestyle.

=== 2022 ===
Kromowidjojo retired from competitive swimming in January 2022. Her retirement was the second in a two-month period by a professional female Dutch swimmer who competed at the 2008 and 2012 Olympic Games after Femke Heemskerk retired in December 2021. Kromowidjojo said to FINA, "I fulfilled my career as a professional athlete. Swimming will remain my passion, but no longer on a professional level."

== Personal life ==
Kromowidjojo was born in Sauwerd to a Javanese Surinamese father and a Dutch mother. She started swimming at the age of three, while on a family holiday in Spain.

She suffered viral meningitis while training with the national team in the Canary Islands in July 2010, but recovered to take part in the World Championships later that year.

Kromowidjojo was a student at the Business School Notenboom in Eindhoven. In 2013–14, she was dating former elite swimmer Pieter van den Hoogenband. They were chosen as the hottest couple of 2013 by several Dutch newspapers. Since 2015, she has been in a relationship with Dutch swimmer Ferry Weertman. In 2019, Kromowidjojo and Weertman announced their engagement.

She appeared in the 23rd season of the television show Wie is de Mol?.

== Personal bests ==
Short course
| Event | Time | Date | Location |
|---|---|---|---|
| 50 m freestyle | 22.93 ER | 2017-08-07 | Berlin, Germany |
| 100 m freestyle | 50.95 | 2017-12-15 | Copenhagen, Denmark |
| 200 m freestyle | 1:55.77 | 2011-12-18 | Atlanta, United States |
| 50 m backstroke | 26.10 | 2018-09-28 | Eindhoven, Netherlands |
| 100 m backstroke | 59.57 | 2018-10-05 | Budapest, Hungary |
| 50 m butterfly | 24.44NR | 2021-12-19 | Abu Dhabi, United Arab Emirates |
| 100 m butterfly | 56.63 | 2017-08-07 | Berlin, Germany |

Long course
| Event | Time | Date | Location |
|---|---|---|---|
| 50 m freestyle | 23.85NR | 2017-07-30 | Budapest, Hungary |
| 100 m freestyle | 52.75 | 2012-04-13 | Eindhoven, Netherlands |
| 200 m freestyle | 1:59.47 | 2016-07-02 | Vichy, France |
| 50 m backstroke | 28.20 | 2021-04-10 | Eindhoven, Netherlands |
| 100 m backstroke | 1:02.93 | 2021-04-30 | Eindhoven, Netherlands |
| 50 m butterfly | 25.24NR | 2021-03-13 | Amsterdam, Netherlands |
| 100 m butterfly | 58.38 | 2020-12-04 | Rotterdam, Netherlands |

== See also ==
- Dutch records in swimming
- Dutch Indonesians
- World record progression 50 metres freestyle
