= Michelle Coleman =

Swedish swimmer (born 1993)

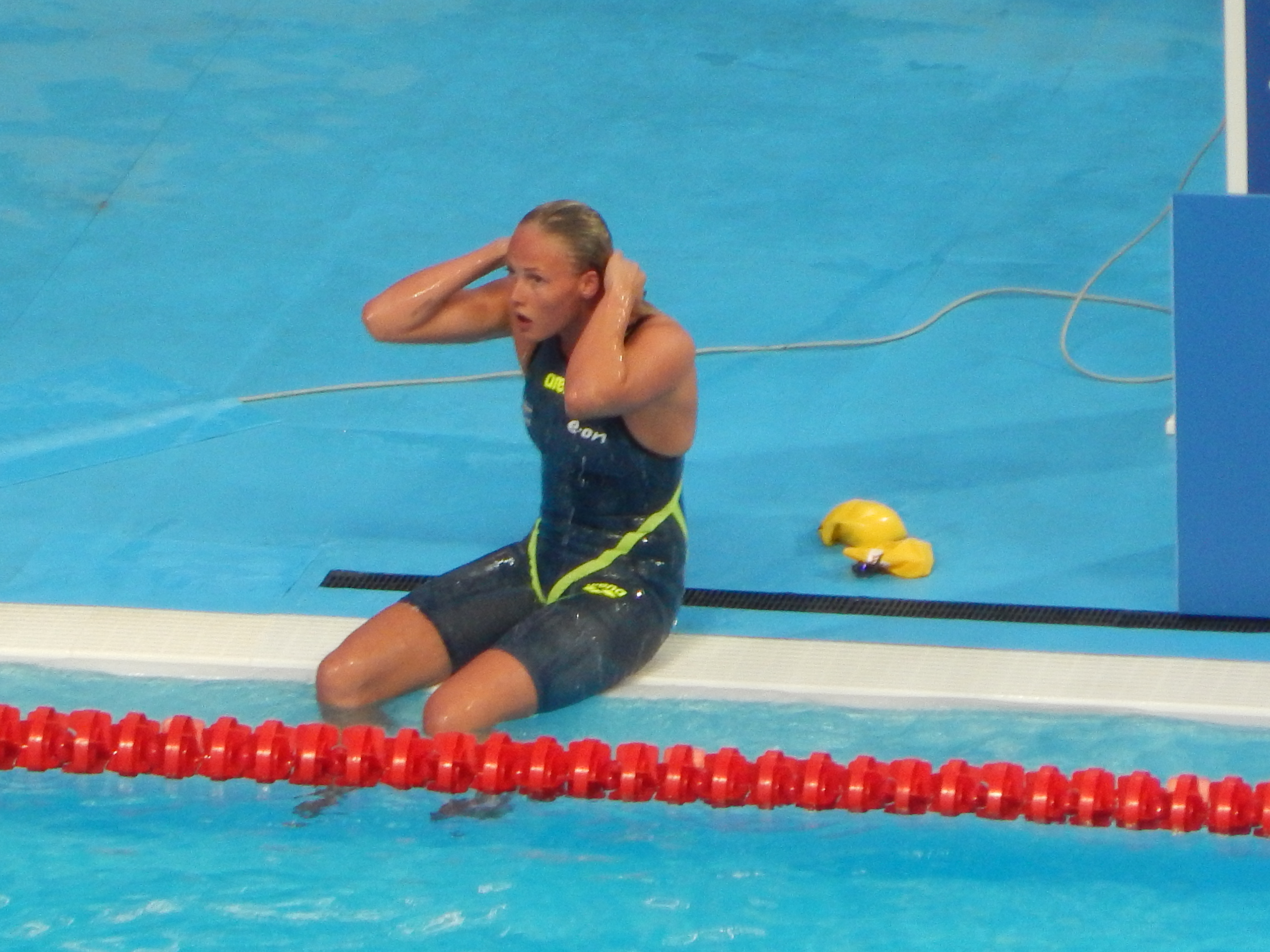

Personal information
- National team: Sweden
- Born: 31 October 1993 (age 32) Vallentuna, Sweden

Sport
- Sport: Swimming
- Strokes: Butterfly, freestyle, backstroke
Medal record
Women's Swimming
Representing Sweden
World Championships (LC)
| Silver medal – second place | 2015 Kazan | 4×100 m medley |
| Silver medal – second place | 2024 Doha | 4×100 m medley |
World Championships (SC)
| Gold medal – first place | 2021 Abu Dhabi | 4×50 m medley |
| Gold medal – first place | 2021 Abu Dhabi | 4×100 m medley |
| Silver medal – second place | 2021 Abu Dhabi | 4×50 m freestyle |
| Bronze medal – third place | 2021 Abu Dhabi | 4×100 m freestyle |
| Bronze medal – third place | 2022 Melbourne | 4×50 m medley |
European Championships (LC)
| Gold medal – first place | 2014 Berlin | 4×100 m freestyle |
| Silver medal – second place | 2012 Debrecen | 4×100 m freestyle |
| Silver medal – second place | 2014 Berlin | 4×200 m freestyle |
| Silver medal – second place | 2014 Berlin | 4×100 m medley |
| Bronze medal – third place | 2014 Berlin | 100 m freestyle |
European Championships (SC)
| Gold medal – first place | 2017 Copenhagen | 4×50 m medley |
| Silver medal – second place | 2013 Herning | 4×50 m freestyle |
| Silver medal – second place | 2017 Copenhagen | 4×50 m freestyle |
| Bronze medal – third place | 2013 Herning | 50 m backstroke |
| Bronze medal – third place | 2013 Herning | 4×50 m medley |

Michelle Coleman (born 31 October 1993) is a Swedish former competitive swimmer specialized in the sprint freestyle and backstroke events. She is the current Swedish national record holder in the 100 metre backstroke (short course), and the 200 metre backstroke (long course and short course). She finished 7th in the 200 metre freestyle at the 2016 Olympic Games in Rio and led off the Swedish silver medal winning 4 × 100 m medley relay team at the 2015 World Championships in Kazan.

== Career ==
At the 2012 Summer Olympics, she competed for the national team in the Women's 4 x 100 metre freestyle relay, but they were disqualified in the final.

At the 2013 European Short Course Swimming Championships won the bronze medal for the first time on 14 December.

Coleman raced at the Rio 2016 Summer Olympics and reached the finals for 200 m freestyle, finishing 7th.

In November 2016 it was announced that Michelle Coleman and fellow Swedish swimmer Jennie Johansson were barred from competing in international events representing Sweden, for disciplinary reasons. The ban was lifted after 2016 and she was able to start racing again in 2017.

In March 2017, Coleman went to Australia to compete in the 2017 New South Wales Open Championships. She won the 200 m freestyle event with a time of 1:55.98. In April 2017 Coleman competed in the Stockholm Swim Open and won the 200 m freestyle event with a time of 1:58.02. She also won the 100 m backstroke event with a time of 1:00.28 ahead of Katinka Hosszú. In the 200 m freestyle even, she won the first place with a time of 1:55.64, which was a world-leading time in 2016-17 season.

Coleman announced her retirement in March 2025.

== Personal bests ==
As of 25 May 2021:

=== Long course (50 m) ===
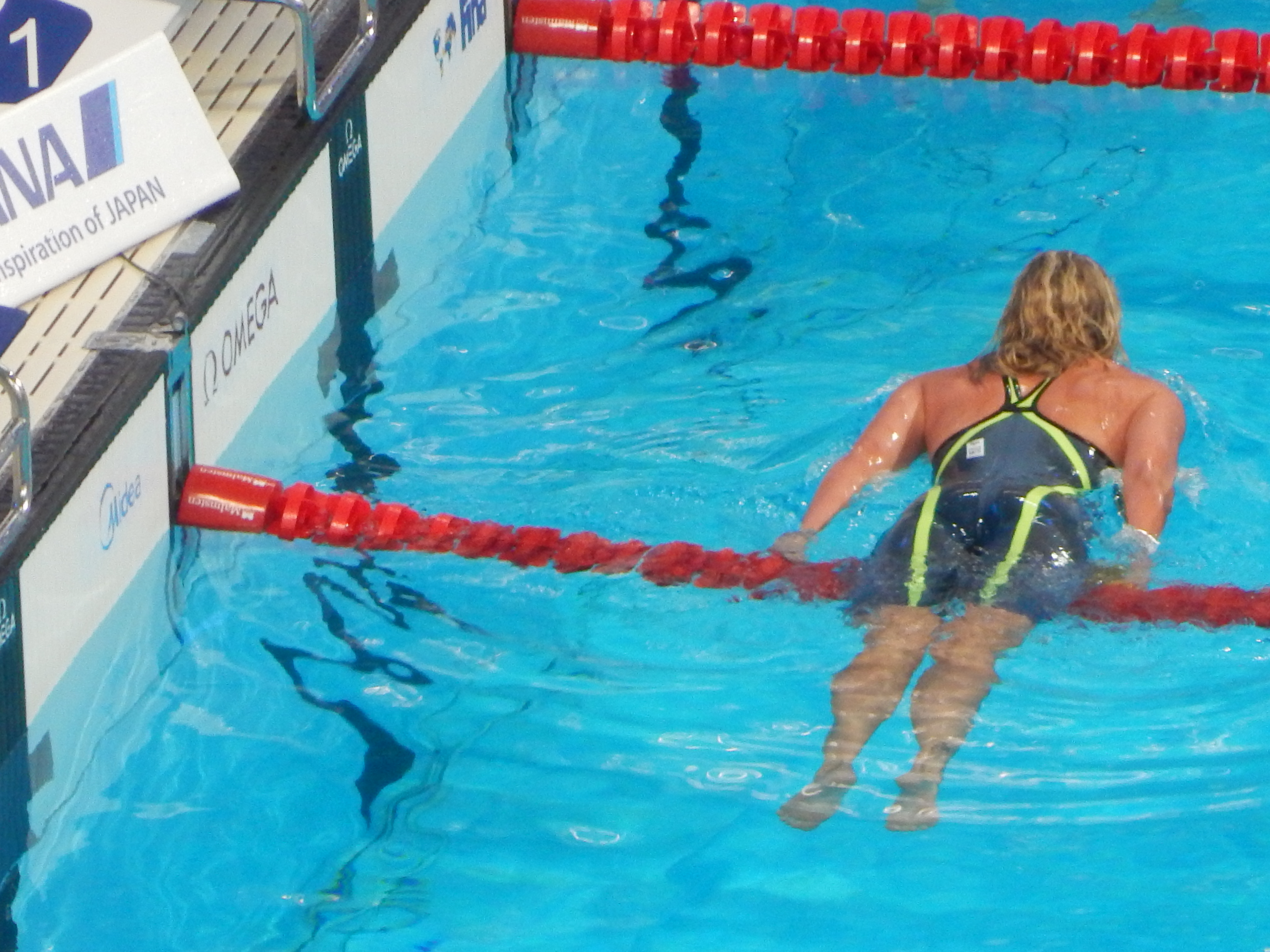
Coleman in Kazan 2015

| Event | Time | | Date | Meet | Location | Ref |
|---|---|---|---|---|---|---|
| 50 m freestyle | 24.26 | | 11 Oct 2019 | FINA: World Cup No 5 | Berlin, Germany | |
| 100 m freestyle | 53.04 | | 3 Nov 2019 | FINA: World Cup No 6 | Kazan, Russia | |
| 200 m freestyle | 1:55.64 | | 8 Apr 2017 | Swim Open Stockholm | Stockholm, Sweden | |
| 400 m freestyle | 4.07.61 | | 24 Jun 2016 | 53rd Trofeo Sette Colli | Rome, Italy | |
| 50 m backstroke | 28.59 | h | 2 Aug 2019 | FINA: World Cup No 1 | Tokyo, Japan | |
| 100 m backstroke | 59.62 | | 26 June 2021 | 58th Trofeo Sette Colli | Rome, Italy | |
| 200 m backstroke | 2:10.56 | | 10 Apr 2014 | Swim Cup (in Dutch) | Eindhoven, Netherlands | |
| 50 m butterfly | 26.05 | | 8 Apr 2021 | Swim Open Stockholm | Stockholm, Sweden | |

Legend: WR – World record; ER – European record; NR – Swedish record;
Records not set in finals: h – heat; sf – semifinal; r – relay 1st leg; rh – relay heat 1st leg; b – B final; † – en route to final mark; so – swim-off; tt – time trial

=== Short course (25 m) ===
| Event | Time | Date | Meet | Location | Ref |
|---|---|---|---|---|---|
| 50 m freestyle | 23.52 | 6 Dec 2023 | European SC Championships | Otopeni, Romania | |
| 100 m freestyle | 51.47 | 17 Nov 2019 | Swedish SC Championships | Eskilstuna, Sweden | |
| 200 m freestyle | 1.53.51 | 23 Nov 2013 | Swedish SC Championships | Gothenburg, Sweden | |
| 50 m backstroke | 26.67 | 14 Dec 2013 | European SC Championships | Herning, Denmark | |
| 50 m backstroke | 26.67 | 17 Nov 2019 | Swedish SC Championships | Eskilstuna, Sweden | |
| 100 m backstroke | 56.57 | 16 Nov 2018 | Swedish SC Championships | Stockholm, Sweden | |
| 200 m backstroke | 2:03.26 | 22 Nov 2014 | Swedish SC Championships | Stockholm, Sweden | |
| 50 m butterfly | 26.05 | 25 Oct 2020 | ISL Series - Match 3 | Budapest, Hungary | |

== Personal life ==
Coleman's father is originally from New Zealand.
