= Fátima Gallardo =

Spanish swimmer

Personal information
- Full name: Fátima Gallardo Carapeto
- Nationality: Spanish
- Born: 24 May 1997 (age 29)

Sport
- Sport: Swimming

Fátima Gallardo Carapeto (born 24 May 1997) is a Spanish swimmer. She competed in the women's 4 × 100 metre freestyle relay event at the 2016 Summer Olympics.
