= Laura Letrari =

Italian swimmer (born 1989)

Personal information
- Born: 8 March 1989 (age 37) Bressanone, Italy

Sport
- Sport: Swimming
- Strokes: Freestyle
Medal record
Women's swimming
Representing Italy
European Championships (SC)
Bronze medal – third place	2010 Eindhoven	4×50 m medley
Bronze medal – third place	2011 Szczecin	4×50 m freestyle
Mediterranean Games
Gold medal – first place	2009 Pescara	4×100 m freestyle
Gold medal – first place	2018 Tarragona	4×100 m freestyle
Gold medal – first place	2018 Tarragona	4×200 m freestyle
Summer Universiade
Gold medal – first place	2015 Gwangju	4×100 m medley

Laura Letrari (born 8 March 1989) is an Italian swimmer. At the 2012 Summer Olympics, she competed for the national team in the women's 4 × 100-metre freestyle relay; however, they finished in 12th place in the heats, failing to reach the final.
