= Erika Ferraioli =

Italian swimmer (born 1986)

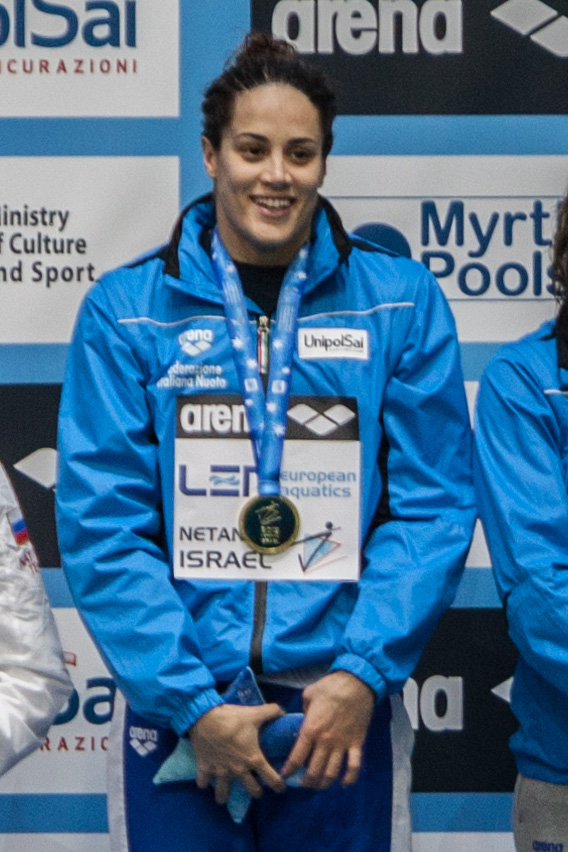
- Ferraioli at the 2015 European Short Course Swimming Championships in Netanya, Israel

Personal information
- Nationality: Italian
- Born: 23 March 1986 (age 40) Rome, Italy
- Height: 1.80 m (5 ft 11 in)
- Weight: 65 kg (143 lb)

Sport
- Sport: Swimming
- Strokes: Freestyle
Medal record
World Championships (SC)
Silver medal – second place	2016 Windsor	4x100 m freestyle
Silver medal – second place	2016 Windsor	4x50 m medley
Bronze medal – third place	2016 Windsor	4x50 m freestyle
Bronze medal – third place	2014 Doha	4×100 m freestyle
Bronze medal – third place	2014 Doha	4×50 m mixed medley
European Championships (LC)
Gold medal – first place	2014 Berlin	4×100 m mixed freestyle
Silver medal – second place	2008 Eindhoven	4×100 m freestyle
Silver medal – second place	2016 London	4×100 m freestyle
Silver medal – second place	2016 London	4×100 m medley
Silver medal – second place	2016 London	4×100 m mixed freestyle
Bronze medal – third place	2012 Debrecen	4×100 m freestyle
Bronze medal – third place	2014 Berlin	4×100 m freestyle
European Championships (SC)
Gold medal – first place	2015 Netanya	4×50 m freestyle
Gold medal – first place	2015 Netanya	4×50 m mixed freestyle
Gold medal – first place	2015 Netanya	4×50 m mixed medley
Silver medal – second place	2013 Herning	4×50 m mixed freestyle
Bronze medal – third place	2011 Szczecin	4×50 m freestyle
Bronze medal – third place	2015 Netanya	4×50 m medley
Bronze medal – third place	2017 Copenhagen	4x50 m mixed freestyle
Military World Games
Silver medal – second place	2011 Rio de Janeiro	100 m freestyle
Silver medal – second place	2011 Rio de Janeiro	4×100 m freestyle
Bronze medal – third place	2011 Rio de Janeiro	50 m freestyle
Bronze medal – third place	2011 Rio de Janeiro	4×100 m medley
Mediterranean Games
Gold medal – first place	2018 Tarragona	100 m freestyle
Gold medal – first place	2018 Tarragona	4×100 m freestyle
Gold medal – first place	2018 Tarragona	4×100 m medley
Silver medal – second place	2013 Mersin	100 m freestyle
Universiade
Silver medal – second place	2013 Kazan	4×100 m medley

Erika Ferraioli (born 23 March 1986) is an Italian swimmer.

At the 2008 Summer Olympics, she was part of the Italian 4 × 100 m freestyle relay team. She competed in the women's 50m freestyle at the 2012 Summer Olympics in London, finishing with a time of 25.69 seconds in 32nd place in the heats, as well as being part of the 4 × 100 m freestyle team.

== See also ==
- Italian swimmers multiple medalists at the international competitions
