= Cloé Hache =

French swimmer

Personal information
- Nationality: French
- Born: 11 December 1997 (age 28) Nogent-sur-Marne, Paris
- Height: 171 cm (5 ft 7 in)
- Weight: 62 kg (137 lb)

Sport
- Sport: Swimming

Cloé Hache (born 11 December 1997) is a French swimmer. Hache was born in Nogent-sur-Marne, Paris. She competed in the women's 4 × 200 metre freestyle relay event at the 2016 Summer Olympics.
