= Noémi Girardet =

Swiss swimmer

Personal information
- Born: 12 December 1994 (age 31) Lancy, Switzerland

Sport
- Sport: Swimming

Noémi Girardet (born 12 December 1994) is a Swiss freestyle swimmer. She competed in the women's 4 × 100 metre freestyle relay event at the 2016 Summer Olympics.
