= 2010 FINA World Swimming Championships (25 m) – Women's 200 metre freestyle =

Women's 200m Freestyle at the 2010 Short Course Worlds
- Dates: 19 December 2010 (heats and final)
- Competitors: 72
- Winning time: 1:52.29

Medalists
gold medal	Camille Muffat	France
silver medal	Katie Hoff	United States
bronze medal	Kylie Palmer	Australia

The Women's 200 Freestyle at the 10th FINA World Swimming Championships (25m) took place 19 December 2010 in Dubai, United Arab Emirates. 72 individuals swam in the preliminary heats of the event, with the top-8 advancing to a final that evening.

== Records ==
Prior to the competition, the existing world and championship records were as follows.

	Name	Nation	Time	Location	Date
World record	Federica Pellegrini	Italy	1:51.17	Istanbul	13 December 2009
Championship record	Camille Muffat	France	1:53.17	Dubai	15 December 2010

The following records were established during the competition:

Date	Round	Name	Nation	Time	WR	CR
19 December 2010	Final	Camille Muffat	France	1:52.29		CR

== Results ==
=== Heats ===
Rank	Heat	Lane	Name	Time	Notes
1	8	7	Katie Hoff (USA)	1:53.48	Q
2	9	5	Camille Muffat (FRA)	1:54.27	Q
3	10	4	Federica Pellegrini (ITA)	1:54.66	Q
4	10	7	Kylie Palmer (AUS)	1:54.78	Q
5	8	3	Tang Yi (CHN)	1:54.99	Q
6	8	4	Evelyn Verrasztó (HUN)	1:55.29	Q
7	10	6	Blair Evans (AUS)	1:55.32	Q
8	10	5	Dana Vollmer (USA)	1:55.40	Q
9	9	4	Frederike Heemskerk (NED)	1:55.46	
10	8	5	Silke Lippok (GER)	1:55.58	
11	6	1	Sze Hang Yu (HKG)	1:55.83	
12	9	3	Ágnes Mutina (HUN)	1:55.85	
13	8	8	Leone Vorster (RSA)	1:55.89	
14	10	8	Sharon van Rouwendaal (NED)	1:56.22	
15	10	3	Zhu Qianwei (CHN)	1:56.27	
16	10	1	Patricia Castro Ortega (ESP)	1:56.41	
17	9	7	Genevieve Saumur (CAN)	1:56.54	
18	9	6	Sarah Sjöström (SWE)	1:56.58	
19	9	2	Coralie Balmy (FRA)	1:57.10	
20	8	6	Petra Granlund (SWE)	1:57.27	
21	9	1	Daniela Schreiber (GER)	1:57.38	
22	7	4	Nina Rangelova (BUL)	1:57.48	
23	7	3	Cecilie Waage Johannessen (NOR)	1:57.93	
24	8	2	Veronika Popova (RUS)	1:57.99	
25	7	2	Renata Fabiola Spagnolo (ITA)	1:58.11	
26	7	7	Daryna Zevina (UKR)	1:58.12	
27	5	6	Pernille Blume (DEN)	1:59.02	
28	7	6	Tatiana Lemos (BRA)	1:59.18	
29	6	2	Andreina Pinto (VEN)	1:59.26	
30	10	2	Victoria Malyutina (RUS)	1:59.46	
31	6	5	Cecilia Biagioli (ARG)	1:59.47	
32	7	8	Kristel Kobrich (CHI)	1:59.53	
33	6	4	Barbora Závadová (CZE)	2:00.38	
34	6	3	Katarina Listopadova (SVK)	2:00.46	
35	7	5	Alexandra Gabor (CAN)	2:00.54	
36	9	8	Katarina Filova (SVK)	2:01.28	
37	5	2	Theodora Drakou (GRE)	2:01.44	
38	6	8	Fernanda González (MEX)	2:01.45	
39	5	5	Chen Ting (TPE)	2:01.51	
40	7	1	Nina Sovinek (SLO)	2:01.62	
41	5	3	Alexia Pamela Benitez Quijada (ESA)	2:01.76	
42	5	4	Gizem Bozkurt (TUR)	2:02.09	
43	5	8	Carmen Cianci (COL)	2:02.35	
44	4	2	Patarawadee Kittiya (THA)	2:02.64	
45	4	4	Victoria Isabelle Ho (JAM)	2:02.90	
46	6	7	Maiko Fujino (JPN)	2:03.01	
47	5	1	Ranohon Amanova (UZB)	2:03.03	
48	4	3	Kirsten Ann Lapham (ZIM)	2:03.52	
49	4	6	Simona Marinova (MKD)	2:03.74	
50	5	7	Nicole Horn (ZIM)	2:03.75	
51	6	6	Burcu Dolunay (TUR)	2:03.98	
52	3	7	Lara Butler (CAY)	2:04.61	
53	4	5	Daniela Kaori Miyahara (PER)	2:04.92	
54	4	8	Malia Mghezzi Bekhouche (ALG)	2:06.59	
55	4	7	Andrea Cedrón (PER)	2:08.10	
56	3	4	Davina Mangion (MLT)	2:09.27	
57	3	5	Sara Hyajna (JOR)	2:09.38	
58	4	1	Shannon Austin (SEY)	2:10.67	
59	3	2	Talita Baqlah (JOR)	2:11.97	
60	3	3	Talisa Pace (MLT)	2:12.16	
61	3	1	Lou Wai Sam (MAC)	2:12.19	
62	3	6	Olivia Planteau de Maroussem (MRI)	2:12.86	
63	2	4	Tieri Erasito (FIJ)	2:15.29	
64	2	3	Britany van Lange (GUY)	2:15.77	
65	1	3	Cheyenne Rova (FIJ)	2:20.66	
66	1	4	Danielle Bernadine Findlay (ZAM)	2:21.19	
67	2	6	Anum Bandey (PAK)	2:21.92	
68	2	5	Emily Chan Chee (MRI)	2:23.71	
69	2	2	Grace Kimball (NMI)	2:26.24	
70	2	7	Osisang Chilton (PLW)	2:29.32	
71	1	5	Mahnoor Maqsood (PAK)	2:31.40	
–	8	1	Lotte Friis (DEN)	DNS	

=== Final ===
Rank	Lane	Name	Time	Notes
1st place, gold medalist(s)	5	Camille Muffat (FRA)	1:52.29	CR
2nd place, silver medalist(s)	4	Katie Hoff (USA)	1:52.91	
3rd place, bronze medalist(s)	6	Kylie Palmer (AUS)	1:52.96	
4	2	Tang Yi (CHN)	1:53.07	
5	1	Blair Evans (AUS)	1:55.03	
6	7	Evelyn Verrasztó (HUN)	1:55.06	
7	3	Federica Pellegrini (ITA)	1:55.24	
8	8	Dana Vollmer (USA)	1:56.73	
