= Swimming at the 2012 European Aquatics Championships – Women's 200 metre freestyle =

Women's 200 metre freestyle at the 2012 European Aquatics Championships
- Dates: May 25, 2012 (heats and semifinals); May 26, 2012 (final)
- Competitors: 41 from 25 nations
- Winning time: 1:56.76

Medalists
| gold medal | Federica Pellegrini | Italy |
| silver medal | Silke Lippok | Germany |
| bronze medal | Ophélie-Cyrielle Étienne | France |

The women's 200 metre freestyle competition of the swimming events at the 2012 European Aquatics Championships took place May 25 and 26. The heats and semifinals took place on May 25, the final on May 26.

== Records ==
Prior to the competition, the existing world, European and championship records were as follows.

| | Name | Nation | Time | Location | Date |
|---|---|---|---|---|---|
| World record European record | Federica Pellegrini | Italy | 1:52.98 | Rome | July 29, 2009 |
| Championship record | Federica Pellegrini | Italy | 1:55.45 | Budapest | August 14, 2010 |

== Results ==
=== Heats ===
47 swimmers participated in 6 heats.

| Rank | Heat | Lane | Name | Nationality | Time | Notes |
|---|---|---|---|---|---|---|
| 1 | 6 | 4 | Federica Pellegrini | Italy | 1:59.07 | Q |
| 2 | 5 | 4 | Silke Lippok | Germany | 1:59.96 | Q |
| 3 | 5 | 3 | Ophélie-Cyrielle Étienne | France | 2:00.05 | Q |
| 4 | 5 | 5 | Sara Isaković | Slovenia | 2:00.12 | Q |
| 5 | 4 | 3 | Alice Mizzau | Italy | 2:00.31 | Q |
| 6 | 6 | 7 | Cecilie Johannessen | Norway | 2:00.48 | Q |
| 7 | 6 | 3 | Patricia Castro Ortega | Spain | 2:00.61 | Q |
| 8 | 4 | 5 | Evelyn Verrasztó | Hungary | 2:00.85 | Q |
| 9 | 4 | 4 | Ágnes Mutina | Hungary | 2:00.88 | Q |
| 10 | 4 | 6 | Nina Rangelova | Bulgaria | 2:01.04 | Q |
| 11 | 5 | 7 | Lydia Morant Varo | Spain | 2:01.19 | Q |
| 12 | 6 | 8 | Katarina Filová | Slovakia | 2:01.32 | Q |
| 13 | 6 | 6 | Mylène Lazare | France | 2:01.46 | Q |
| 14 | 4 | 1 | Camelia Potec | Romania | 2:01.58 | Q |
| 15 | 6 | 2 | Diletta Carli | Italy | 2:01.61 | |
| 16 | 4 | 2 | Alice Nesti | Italy | 2:01.74 | |
| 17 | 5 | 1 | Anna Stylianou | Cyprus | 2:01.94 | Q |
| 18 | 5 | 2 | Lisa Vitting | Germany | 2:02.09 | Q |
| 19 | 6 | 1 | Sycerika McMahon | Ireland | 2:02.17 | |
| 20 | 3 | 5 | Urša Bežan | Slovenia | 2:02.31 | |
| 21 | 4 | 7 | Melanie Nocher | Ireland | 2:03.21 | |
| 22 | 2 | 4 | Eygló Ósk Gústafsdóttir | Iceland | 2:03.31 | NR |
| 23 | 2 | 5 | Nastja Govejšek | Slovenia | 2:03.36 | |
| 24 | 4 | 8 | Karolina Szczepaniak | Poland | 2:03.49 | |
| 25 | 3 | 4 | Danielle Carmen Villars | Switzerland | 2:03.57 | |
| 26 | 2 | 2 | Eva Hannesdóttir | Iceland | 2:03.58 | |
| 27 | 3 | 2 | Bethany Carson | Ireland | 2:03.63 | |
| 28 | 6 | 5 | Gabriella Fagundez | Sweden | 2:03.68 | |
| 29 | 3 | 6 | Sára Joó | Hungary | 2:03.98 | |
| 30 | 1 | 7 | Kristina Krasyukova | Russia | 2:04.07 | |
| 31 | 2 | 6 | Jūratė Ščerbinskaitė | Lithuania | 2:04.24 | |
| 32 | 3 | 8 | Aksana Dziamidava | Belarus | 2:04.28 | |
| 33 | 5 | 8 | Eva Chavez-Diaz | Austria | 2:04.81 | |
| 34 | 1 | 2 | Kristina Kochetkova | Russia | 2:05.15 | |
| 35 | 2 | 1 | Veronica Orheim Bjørlykke | Norway | 2:05.28 | |
| 36 | 3 | 7 | Valeriya Podlesna | Ukraine | 2:06.59 | |
| 37 | 1 | 1 | Alona Ribakova | Latvia | 2:06.64 | |
| 38 | 1 | 3 | Anastasia Bogdanovski | Macedonia | 2:09.40 | |
| 39 | 2 | 8 | Susann Bjoernsen | Norway | 2:09.55 | |
| 40 | 1 | 5 | Emilie Loevberg | Norway | 2:09.89 | |
| 41 | 1 | 6 | Cecilia Eysturdal | Faroe Islands | 2:15.41 | |
| | 1 | 4 | Johanna Gerda Gustafsdottir | Iceland | DNS | |
| | 2 | 3 | Nuala Murphy | Ireland | DNS | |
| | 2 | 7 | Burcu Dolunay | Turkey | DNS | |
| | 3 | 1 | Julia Hassler | Liechtenstein | DNS | |
| | 3 | 3 | Stina Gardell | Sweden | DNS | |
| | 5 | 6 | Daniela Schreiber | Germany | DNS | |

=== Semifinals ===
The eight fasters swimmers advanced to the final.

==== Semifinal 1 ====
| Rank | Lane | Name | Nationality | Time | Notes |
|---|---|---|---|---|---|
| 1 | 4 | Silke Lippok | Germany | 1:59.07 | Q |
| 2 | 5 | Sara Isaković | Slovenia | 1:59.55 | Q |
| 3 | 6 | Evelyn Verrasztó | Hungary | 1:59.72 | Q |
| 4 | 1 | Camelia Potec | Romania | 2:00.23 | |
| 5 | 3 | Cecilie Johannessen | Norway | 2:00.26 | |
| 6 | 2 | Nina Rangelova | Bulgaria | 2:00.47 | |
| 7 | 7 | Katarina Filová | Slovakia | 2:01.31 | |
| 8 | 8 | Lisa Vitting | Germany | 2:01.82 | |

==== Semifinal 2 ====
| Rank | Lane | Name | Nationality | Time | Notes |
|---|---|---|---|---|---|
| 1 | 4 | Federica Pellegrini | Italy | 1:57.81 | Q |
| 2 | 3 | Alice Mizzau | Italy | 1:58.55 | Q |
| 3 | 6 | Patricia Castro Ortega | Spain | 1:58.95 | Q |
| 4 | 5 | Ophélie-Cyrielle Étienne | France | 1:59.66 | Q |
| 5 | 2 | Ágnes Mutina | Hungary | 2:00.15 | Q |
| 6 | 1 | Mylène Lazare | France | 2:00.21 | |
| 7 | 7 | Lydia Morant Varo | Spain | 2:00.41 | |
| 8 | 8 | Anna Stylianou | Cyprus | 2:01.53 | |

=== Final ===
The final was held at 17:31.

| Rank | Lane | Name | Nationality | Time | Notes |
|---|---|---|---|---|---|
| 1st place, gold medalist(s) | 4 | Federica Pellegrini | Italy | 1:56.76 | |
| 2nd place, silver medalist(s) | 6 | Silke Lippok | Germany | 1:58.19 | |
| 3rd place, bronze medalist(s) | 7 | Ophélie-Cyrielle Étienne | France | 1:58.23 | |
| 4 | 5 | Alice Mizzau | Italy | 1:58.39 | |
| 5 | 2 | Sara Isaković | Slovenia | 1:58.90 | |
| 6 | 3 | Patricia Castro Ortega | Spain | 1:59.39 | |
| 7 | 8 | Ágnes Mutina | Hungary | 1:59.87 | |
| 8 | 1 | Evelyn Verrasztó | Hungary | 2:00.06 | |
