= 2010 FINA World Swimming Championships (25 m) – Women's 400 metre freestyle =

Women's 400m Freestyle at the 2010 Short Course Worlds
- Date: 17 December 2010
- Competitors: 47
- Winning time: 3:57.07

Medalists
gold medal	Katie Hoff	United States
silver medal	Kylie Palmer	Australia
bronze medal	Federica Pellegrini	Italy

The Women's 400 Freestyle at the 10th FINA World Swimming Championships (25m) was swum on 17 December 2010 in Dubai, United Arab Emirates. 47 swimmers raced in the preliminary heats, with the top-8 advancing to a final that evening.

== Records ==
Prior to the competition, the existing world and championship records were as follows.

	Name	Nation	Time	Location	Date
World record	Joanne Jackson	United Kingdom	3:54.92	Leeds	8 August 2009
Championship record	Kylie Palmer	Australia	3:59.23	Manchester	11 April 2008

The following records were established during the competition:

Date	Round	Name	Nation	Time	WR	CR
17 December 2010	Final	Katie Hoff	United States	3:57.07		CR

== Results ==
=== Heats ===
Rank	Heat	Lane	Name	Time	Notes
1	6	3	Katie Hoff (USA)	4:00.37	Q
2	6	4	Coralie Balmy (FRA)	4:00.73	Q
3	4	4	Kylie Palmer (AUS)	4:01.45	Q
4	5	6	Federica Pellegrini (ITA)	4:02.44	Q
5	5	5	Chloe Sutton (USA)	4:02.77	Q
6	4	6	Patricia Castro (ESP)	4:02.85	Q
7	6	6	Erika Villaécija (ESP)	4:04.88	Q
8	1	1	Li Xuanxu (CHN)	4:05.25	Q
9	6	2	Elena Sokolova (RUS)	4:05.69	
10	3	1	Nina Rangelova (BUL)	4:06.00	
11	6	5	Ophélie Cyrielle Etienne (FRA)	4:06.22	
12	5	4	Lotte Friis (DEN)	4:06.24	
13	4	2	Kristel Kobrich (CHI)	4:06.28	
14	5	2	Veronika Popova (RUS)	4:06.39	
15	3	5	Hannah Miley (GBR)	4:07.17	
16	5	3	Katie Goldman (AUS)	4:07.72	
17	6	8	Leone Vorster (RSA)	4:08.33	
18	6	7	Nina Cesar (SLO)	4:08.61	
19	4	7	Cecilia Biagioli (ARG)	4:09.29	
20	3	3	Maiko Fujino (JPN)	4:09.40	
21	4	1	Barbora Závadová (CZE)	4:09.46	
22	3	4	Andreina Pinto (VEN)	4:10.69	
23	6	1	Tjasa Oder (SLO)	4:11.39	
24	5	1	Cecilie Waage Johannessen (NOR)	4:12.07	
25	4	8	Katarina Filova (SVK)	4:14.69	
26	2	6	Samantha Arévalo (ECU)	4:15.47	
27	5	8	Alexandra Gabor (CAN)	4:15.67	
28	3	7	Elin Sofia Slaatmo (NOR)	4:15.86	
29	3	6	Ting Sheng-Yo (TPE)	4:16.22	
30	2	4	Julia Hassler (LIE)	4:16.28	
31	3	8	Alexia Pamela Benitez Quijada (ESA)	4:16.37	
32	2	5	Andrea Cedrón (PER)	4:17.27	
33	2	3	Daniela Kaori Miyahara (PER)	4:17.48	
34	3	1	Simona Marinova (MKD)	4:20.07	
35	2	7	Malia Mghezzi Bekhouche (ALG)	4:21.74	
36	2	2	Victoria Isabelle Ho (JAM)	4:27.08	
37	2	1	Shannon Austin (SEY)	4:33.84	
38	1	4	Davina Mangion (MLT)	4:39.21	
39	2	8	Olivia Planteau de Maroussem (MRI)	4:45.83	
40	1	6	Estellah Fils Rabetsara (MAD)	4:49.24	
41	1	2	Britany van Lange (GUY)	4:53.20	
42	1	5	Tieri Erasito (FIJ)	4:55.28	
43	1	3	Anum Bandey (PAK)	4:55.96	
44	1	7	Grace Kimball (NMI)	5:10.29	
–	4	3	Ágnes Mutina (HUN)	DNS	
–	4	5	Liu Jing (CHN)	DNS	
–	5	7	Chiara Masini Luccetti (ITA)	DNS	

=== Final ===
Rank	Lane	Name	Time	Notes
1st place, gold medalist(s)	4	Katie Hoff (USA)	3:57.07	CR
2nd place, silver medalist(s)	3	Kylie Palmer (AUS)	3:58.39	
3rd place, bronze medalist(s)	6	Federica Pellegrini (ITA)	3:59.52	
4	2	Chloe Sutton (USA)	4:00.05	
5	5	Coralie Balmy (FRA)	4:00.14	
6	8	Li Xuanxu (CHN)	4:02.38	
7	1	Erika Villaécija (ESP)	4:02.69	
8	7	Patricia Castro (ESP)	4:04.85	
