= Swimming at the 2012 European Aquatics Championships – Women's 400 metre freestyle =

Women's 400 metre freestyle at the 2012 European Aquatics Championships
- Dates: May 27, 2012 (heats and final)
- Competitors: 26 from 17 nations
- Winning time: 4:05.31

Medalists
gold medal	Coralie Balmy	France
silver medal	Mireia Belmonte García	Spain
bronze medal	Ophélie-Cyrielle Étienne	France

The women's 400 Metre Freestyle competition of the swimming events at the 2012 European Aquatics Championships took place May 27. The heats and final took place on May 27.

== Records ==
Prior to the competition, the existing World, European and Championship records were as follows.

	Name	Nation	Time	Location	Date
World record European record	Federica Pellegrini	Italy	3:59.15	Rome	July 26, 2009
Championship record	Federica Pellegrini	Italy	4:01.53	Eindhoven	March 24, 2008

== Results ==
=== Heats ===
30 swimmers participated in 4 heats.

Rank	Heat	Lane	Name	Nationality	Time	Notes
1	4	5	Éva Risztov	Hungary	4:10.25	Q
2	3	6	Martina de Memme	Italy	4:10.44	Q
3	3	4	Coralie Balmy	France	4:11.07	Q
4	3	5	Boglárka Kapás	Hungary	4:11.15	Q
5	4	3	Camelia Potec	Romania	4:11.43	Q
6	2	4	Mireia Belmonte García	Spain	4:12.30	Q
7	2	5	Ophélie-Cyrielle Étienne	France	4:12.86	Q
8	4	6	Alice Nesti	Italy	4:13.05	Q
9	3	3	Lydia Morant Varo	Spain	4:13.08	
10	4	4	Federica Pellegrini	Italy	4:14.27	
11	2	6	Nina Rangelova	Bulgaria	4:14.75	
12	3	7	Silke Lippok	Germany	4:15.85	
13	4	7	Julia Hassler	Liechtenstein	4:14.95	
14	2	3	Ágnes Mutina	Hungary	4:15.89	
15	2	7	Diletta Carli	Italy	4:16.72	
16	2	2	Cecilie Johannessen	Norway	4:17.92	
17	2	8	Spela Bohinc	Slovenia	4:12.54	
18	4	1	Jördis Steinegger	Austria	4:20.07	
19	3	1	Anna Stylianou	Cyprus	4:20.21	
20	3	8	Iryna Glavnyk	Ukraine	4:20.40	
21	4	8	Ursa Bezan	Slovenia	4:21.98	
22	1	4	Valeriya Podlesna	Ukraine	4:24.42	
23	1	6	Jūratė Ščerbinskaitė	Lithuania	4:24.65	
24	2	1	Donata Kilijanska	Poland	4:25.36	
25	1	3	Sigrún Brá Sverrisdóttir	Iceland	4:31.65	
26	1	2	Cecilia Eysturdal	Faroe Islands	4:42.88	
	4	2	Isabelle Härle	Germany	DNS	
	3	2	Sycerika McMahon	Ireland	DNS	
	1	5	Nuala Murphy	Ireland	DNS	
	1	7	Noora Laukkanen	Finland	DNS	

=== Final ===
The final was held at 17:47.

Rank	Lane	Name	Nationality	Time	Notes
1st place, gold medalist(s)	3	Coralie Balmy	France	4:05.31	
2nd place, silver medalist(s)	7	Mireia Belmonte García	Spain	4:05.45	NR
3rd place, bronze medalist(s)	1	Ophélie-Cyrielle Étienne	France	4:07.47	
4	4	Éva Risztov	Hungary	4:07.72	
5	6	Boglárka Kapás	Hungary	4:08.73	
6	2	Camelia Potec	Romania	4:08.91	
7	5	Martina de Memme	Italy	4:10.82	
8	8	Alice Nesti	Italy	4:11.13	
