= Swimming at the 2014 European Aquatics Championships – Women's 200 metre individual medley =

Women's 200 metre individual medley at the Swimming at the 2014 European Aquatics Championships
- Dates: 20–21 August
- Competitors: 31 from 19 nations
- Winning time: 2:08.11

Medalists
gold medal	Katinka Hosszú	Hungary
silver medal	Aimee Willmott	Great Britain
bronze medal	Lisa Zaiser	Austria

The Women's 200 metre individual medley competition of the 2014 European Aquatics Championships was held on 20–21 August.

== Records ==
Prior to the competition, the existing world, European and championship records were as follows.

	Name	Nation	Time	Location	Date
World record	Ariana Kukors	United States	2:06.15	Rome	27 July 2009
European record	Katinka Hosszú	Hungary	2:07.46	Rome	27 July 2009
Championship record	Katinka Hosszú	Hungary	2:10.09	Budapest	12 August 2010

== Results ==
=== Heats ===
The heats were held at 09:45.

Rank	Heat	Lane	Name	Nationality	Time	Notes
1	4	4	Katinka Hosszú	Hungary	2:11.06	Q
2	3	5	Lisa Zaiser	Austria	2:13.18	Q
3	2	4	Aimee Willmott	Great Britain	2:13.28	Q
4	3	4	Mireia Belmonte	Spain	2:13.50	Q
5	2	2	Barbora Závadová	Czech Republic	2:13.90	Q
6	4	5	Evelyn Verrasztó	Hungary	2:14.03	Q
7	2	5	Viktoriya Andreeva	Russia	2:14.09	Q
8	4	3	Beatriz Gómez Cortés	Spain	2:14.16	Q
9	3	6	Wendy van der Zanden	Netherlands	2:14.61	Q
10	3	3	Stina Gardell	Sweden	2:14.62	Q
11	2	6	Louise Hansson	Sweden	2:14.86	Q
12	2	3	Stefania Pirozzi	Italy	2:15.26	Q
13	4	2	Sycerika McMahon	Ireland	2:15.46	Q
14	3	1	Victoria Malyutina	Russia	2:15.85	Q
15	3	2	Yana Martynova	Russia	2:15.90	
16	2	7	Amit Ivry	Israel	2:15.94	Q
17	4	6	Catalina Corró	Spain	2:16.06	
18	3	8	Victoria Kaminskaya	Portugal	2:16.07	Q
19	4	7	Réka György	Hungary	2:16.22	
20	3	7	Lara Grangeon	France	2:16.68	
21	4	1	Fantine Lesaffre	France	2:17.15	
22	2	8	Gizem Bozkurt	Turkey	2:17.81	
23	4	0	Noora Laukkanen	Finland	2:17.90	
24	1	5	Lisa Stamm	Switzerland	2:18.43	
25	2	0	Alyona Kyselyova	Ukraine	2:18.65	
26	4	8	Tanja Kylliaeinen	Finland	2:19.21	
27	2	1	Alessia Polieri	Italy	2:20.01	
28	4	9	Annick van Westendorp	Switzerland	2:21.58	
29	3	0	Ana Radič	Croatia	2:21.73	
30	1	3	Hilla Kortetjaervi	Finland	2:22.78	
31	1	4	Andrea Podmaníková	Slovakia	2:24.87	

=== Semifinals ===
The semifinals were held at 18:35.

==== Semifinal 1 ====
Rank	Lane	Name	Nationality	Time	Notes
1	5	Mireia Belmonte	Spain	2:11.13	Q
2	3	Evelyn Verrasztó	Hungary	2:12.60	Q
3	4	Lisa Zaiser	Austria	2:13.14	Q
4	2	Stina Gardell	Sweden	2:13.68	Q
5	7	Stefania Pirozzi	Italy	2:14.22	
6	6	Beatriz Gómez Cortés	Spain	2:14.43	
7	1	Victoria Malyutina	Russia	2:15.69	
8	8	Victoria Kaminskaya	Portugal	2:15.77	

==== Semifinal 2 ====
Rank	Lane	Name	Nationality	Time	Notes
1	4	Katinka Hosszú	Hungary	2:08.41	Q, CR
2	5	Aimee Willmott	Great Britain	2:12.39	Q
3	2	Wendy van der Zanden	Netherlands	2:13.25	Q
4	3	Barbora Závadová	Czech Republic	2:13.39	Q
5	6	Viktoriya Andreeva	Russia	2:13.97	
6	7	Louise Hansson	Sweden	2:14.11	
7	1	Sycerika McMahon	Ireland	2:14.42	
8	8	Amit Ivry	Israel	2:14.75	

=== Final ===
The final was held at 18:18.

Rank	Lane	Name	Nationality	Time	Notes
1st place, gold medalist(s)	4	Katinka Hosszú	Hungary	2:08.11	CR
2nd place, silver medalist(s)	3	Aimee Willmott	Great Britain	2:11.44	
3rd place, bronze medalist(s)	2	Lisa Zaiser	Austria	2:12.17	
4	6	Evelyn Verrasztó	Hungary	2:12.95	
5	1	Barbora Závadová	Czech Republic	2:13.24	
6	8	Stina Gardell	Sweden	2:13.25	
7	7	Wendy van der Zanden	Netherlands	2:13.76	
8	5	Mireia Belmonte	Spain	2:18.46	
