= Swimming at the 2012 European Aquatics Championships – Women's 200 metre individual medley =

Deep 200 metre dive for women

Women's 200 metre individual medley at the 2012 European Aquatics Championships
- Dates: May 23, 2012 (heats and semifinals); May 24, 2012 (final)
- Competitors: 24 from 16 nations
- Winning time: 2:10.84

Medalists
gold medal	Katinka Hosszú	Hungary
silver medal	Sophie Allen	Great Britain
bronze medal	Evelyn Verrasztó	Hungary

The women's 200 metre individual medley competition of the swimming events at the 2012 European Aquatics Championships took place May 23 and 24. The heats and semifinals took place on May 23, the final on May 24.

== Records ==
Prior to the competition, the existing world, European and championship records were as follows.

	Name	Nation	Time	Location	Date
World record	Ariana Kukors	United States	2:06.15	Rome	July 27, 2009
European record	Katinka Hosszú	Hungary	2:07.46	Rome	July 27, 2009
Championship record	Katinka Hosszú	Hungary	2:10.09	Budapest	August 12, 2010

== Results ==
=== Heats ===
26 swimmers participated in 4 heats.

Rank	Heat	Lane	Name	Nationality	Time	Notes
1	4	4	Katinka Hosszú	Hungary	2:11.10	Q
2	3	5	Evelyn Verrasztó	Hungary	2:12.92	Q
3	2	4	Zsuzsanna Jakabos	Hungary	2:13.20	
4	2	7	Amit Ivri	Israel	2:14.69	Q, NR
5	4	3	Theresa Michalak	Germany	2:14.95	Q
6	3	7	Ganna Dzerkaľ	Ukraine	2:15.21	Q
7	3	4	Sophie Allen	Great Britain	2:15.24	Q
8	3	3	Stina Gardell	Sweden	2:15.43	Q
9	4	5	Beatriz Gomez Cortes	Spain	2:15.54	Q
10	4	2	Sophie de Ronchi	France	2:16.02	Q
11	4	7	Stefania Pirozzi	Italy	2:17.00	Q
12	3	2	Alexandra Wenk	Germany	2:17.05	Q
13	1	5	Noora Laukkanen	Finland	2:17.06	Q
14	2	1	Kim Daniela Pavlin	Croatia	2:17.13	Q
15	4	6	Lisa Zaiser	Austria	2:17.19	Q
16	2	3	Barbora Závadová	Czech Republic	2:17.23	Q
17	2	5	Lara Grangeon	France	2:17.26	Q
18	3	8	Katarina Listopadová	Slovakia	2:17.66	
19	2	6	Kristina Kochetkova	Russia	2:18.02	
20	2	2	Joerdis Steinegger	Austria	2:18.43	
21	3	1	Sára Joó	Hungary	2:18.57	
22	4	8	Kristina Krasyukova	Russia	2:19.57	
23	1	3	Johanna Gerda Gustafsdottir	Iceland	2:21.88	
	3	6	Alessia Polieri	Italy	DNF	
	1	4	Sara Nordenstam	Norway	DNS	
	4	1	Sycerika McMahon	Ireland	DNS	

=== Semifinals ===
The eight fasters swimmers advanced to the final.

==== Semifinal 1 ====
Rank	Lane	Name	Nationality	Time	Notes
1	4	Evelyn Verrasztó	Hungary	2:12.67	Q
2	5	Theresa Michalak	Germany	2:12.76	Q
3	3	Sophie Allen	Great Britain	2:13.29	Q
4	6	Beatriz Gomez Cortes	Spain	2:14.21	Q
5	1	Lisa Zaiser	Austria	2:14.90	
6	8	Lara Grangeon	France	2:15.79	
7	2	Stefania Pirozzi	Italy	2:16.56	
8	7	Noora Laukkanen	Finland	2:17.30	

==== Semifinal 2 ====
Rank	Lane	Name	Nationality	Time	Notes
1	4	Katinka Hosszú	Hungary	2:11.89	Q
2	6	Stina Gardell	Sweden	2:12.29	Q, NR
3	5	Amit Ivri	Israel	2:13.77	NR
4	3	Ganna Dzerkaľ	Ukraine	2:14.25	Q
5	7	Alexandra Wenk	Germany	2:14.44	Q
6	2	Sophie de Ronchi	France	2:16.05	
7	8	Barbora Závadová	Czech Republic	2:16.09	
8	1	Kim Daniela Pavlin	Croatia	2:16.35	NR

=== Final ===
The final was held at 17:13.

Rank	Lane	Name	Nationality	Time	Notes
1st place, gold medalist(s)	4	Katinka Hosszú	Hungary	2:10.84	
2nd place, silver medalist(s)	2	Sophie Allen	Great Britain	2:11.49	
3rd place, bronze medalist(s)	3	Evelyn Verrasztó	Hungary	2:11.63	
4	6	Theresa Michalak	Germany	2:12.26	
5	5	Stina Gardell	Sweden	2:12.29	=NR
6	1	Ganna Dzerkaľ	Ukraine	2:12.33	
7	8	Alexandra Wenk	Germany	2:12.95	
	7	Beatriz Gomez Cortes	Spain		DSQ
