= Swimming at the 2012 European Aquatics Championships – Men's 200 metre butterfly =

Men's 200 metre butterfly at the 2012 European Aquatics Championships
- Dates: May 23, 2012 (heats and semifinals); May 24, 2012 (final)
- Competitors: 30 from 18 nations
- Winning time: 1:54.95

Medalists
gold medal	László Cseh	Hungary
silver medal	Bence Biczó	Hungary
bronze medal	Ioannis Drymonakos	Greece

The men's 200 metre butterfly competition of the swimming events at the 2012 European Aquatics Championships took place May 23 and 24. The heats and semifinals took place on May 23, the final on May 24.

== Records ==
Prior to the competition, the existing world, European and championship records were as follows.

	Name	Nation	Time	Location	Date
World record	Michael Phelps	United States	1:51.51	Rome	July 29, 2009
European record	László Cseh	Hungary	1:52.70	Beijing	August 13, 2008
Championship record	Paweł Korzeniowski	Poland	1:54.38	Eindhoven	March 21, 2008

== Results ==
=== Heats ===
31 swimmers participated in 4 heats.

Rank	Heat	Lane	Name	Nationality	Time	Notes
1	4	4	Bence Biczó	Hungary	1:57.47	Q
2	3	4	Dinko Jukić	Austria	1:57.69	Q
3	2	4	László Cseh	Hungary	1:58.08	Q
4	2	5	Ioannis Drymonakos	Greece	1:58.16	Q
5	4	3	Francesco Pavone	Italy	1:58.23	Q
6	4	5	Velimir Stjepanović	Serbia	1:58.32	Q
7	2	7	Alexandru Coci	Romania	1:58.42	Q
8	1	2	Nimrod Shapira Bar-Or	Israel	1:58.97	Q
9	3	5	Stefanos Dimitriadis	Greece	1:58.97	Q
10	3	3	Jordan Coelho	France	1:59.32	Q
11	2	3	Konstantinos Markozis	Greece	1:59.48	
12	4	2	Tom Kremer	Israel	1:59.50	Q
13	2	6	Egon van der Straeten	Belgium	1:59.70	Q
14	3	6	Robert Žbogar	Slovenia	1:59.80	Q
15	3	7	Andreas Vazaios	Greece	2:00.05	
16	2	2	Alexandre Liess	Switzerland	2:00.18	Q
17	2	1	Jan Šefl	Czech Republic	2:00.21	Q
18	3	1	Michal Poprawa	Poland	2:00.23	Q
18	3	2	Pedro Diogo Oliveira	Portugal	2:00.23	
20	4	1	Diogo Filipe Carvalho	Portugal	2:00.52	
21	4	7	Duarte Rafael Mourao	Portugal	2:00.63	
22	1	4	Sindri Thor Jakobsson	Norway	2:00.96	NR
23	4	8	Bernhard Wolf	Austria	2:01.69	
24	1	5	Niksa Roki	Croatia	2:01.82	
25	1	6	Nico van Duijn	Switzerland	2:02.02	
25	3	8	Alon Mandel	Israel	2:02.02	
27	2	8	Avi Cohen	Israel	2:02.35	
28	1	3	Jakub Maly	Austria	2:03.03	
29	1	1	Pavel Naroshkin	Estonia	2:04.15	NR
30	1	7	Edgaras Štura	Lithuania	2:08.18	
	4	6	Matteo Pelizzari	Italy	DNS	

=== Semifinals ===
The eight fasters swimmers advanced to the final.

==== Semifinal 1 ====
Rank	Lane	Name	Nationality	Time	Notes
1	3	Velimir Stjepanović	Serbia	1:56.84	Q
2	4	Dinko Jukić	Austria	1:57.02	Q
3	5	Ioannis Drymonakos	Greece	1:57.33	Q
4	2	Jordan Coelho	France	1:57.59	Q
5	1	Alexandre Liess	Switzerland	1:58.13	Q, NR
6	6	Nimrod Shapira Bar-Or	Israel	1:59.09	
7	7	Egon van der Straeten	Belgium	1:59.25	
8	8	Michal Poprawa	Poland	2:00.56	

==== Semifinal 2 ====
Rank	Lane	Name	Nationality	Time	Notes
1	4	Bence Biczó	Hungary	1:55.77	Q
2	3	Francesco Pavone	Italy	1:57.05	Q
3	5	László Cseh	Hungary	1:57.44	Q
4	2	Stefanos Dimitriadis	Greece	1:58.51	
5	1	Robert Žbogar	Slovenia	1:58.75	
6	6	Alexandru Coci	Romania	1:59.49	
7	7	Tom Kremer	Israel	1:59.51	
8	8	Jan Šefl	Czech Republic	1:59.87	

=== Final ===
The final was held at 17:57.

Rank	Lane	Name	Nationality	Time	Notes
1st place, gold medalist(s)	7	László Cseh	Hungary	1:54.95	
2nd place, silver medalist(s)	4	Bence Biczó	Hungary	1:55.85	
3rd place, bronze medalist(s)	2	Ioannis Drymonakos	Greece	1:56.48	
4	3	Dinko Jukić	Austria	1:56.53	
5	5	Velimir Stjepanović	Serbia	1:57.06	
6	6	Francesco Pavone	Italy	1:57.07	
7	1	Jordan Coelho	France	1:58.24	
8	8	Alexandre Liess	Switzerland	1:59.13	
