= 2010 European Junior Swimming Championships =

Water sport competitions

The 2010 European Junior Swimming Championships were held from 14 to 18 July 2010 in Helsinki, Finland. The Championships were organized by LEN, the European Swimming League, and were held in a 50 m pool. Ages for competitors, per LEN rules are: girls-15 or 16 years old; boys-17 or 18 years old.

The 2010 Championships were held in the same country, and the week after, the 2010 European Junior Championships for diving (9-13 July in Helsinki, Finland) and synchronized swimming (7-11 July in Tampere, Finland). A 2010 European Junior Open Water Championships is also to be held; however, not in Finland, but rather in Hoorn, Netherlands on 31 July.

== Participating countries ==
521 swimmers (279 boys, 242 girls) from 44 countries were entered in the event. Teams were from (with total team size following name):

- Armenia (1)
- Austria (8)
- Belarus (6)
- Belgium (12)
- Bulgaria (5)
- Croatia (14)
- Cyprus (1)
- Czech Republic (5)
- Denmark (17)
- Estonia (15)
- Faroe Islands (1)
- Finland (29)
- France (29)
- Germany (30)
- Great Britain (40)
- Greece (12)
- Hungary (9)
- Iceland (5)
- Ireland (2)
- Israel (11)
- Italy (27)
- Latvia (7)
- Lithuania (8)
- Luxembourg (2)
- Macedonia (6)
- Netherlands (13)
- Norway (10)
- Poland (24)
- Portugal (10)
- Romania (5)
- Russia (36)
- Serbia (14)
- Slovakia (7)
- Slovenia (16)
- Spain (24)
- Sweden (20)
- Switzerland (5)
- Turkey (15)
- Ukraine (20)

Five (5) countries were listed as attending, but without any swimmers: Albania, Azerbaijan, Liechtenstein, Moldova, and Montenegro.

== Schedule ==
Preliminary heats began at 9:00; Finals at 17:00. Prelims/semifinals/finals format used for events 200 m and under; prelim/finals used for events over 200 m. In 50 m events, prelims/semifinals/finals held on the same day; in 100 m and 200 m events, prelims/semis held on first day with finals the next event; and for 400 m+ events prelims/finals held the same day. Finals session order shown below.

Date	Wednesday; 14 July 2010	Thursday; 15 July 2010	Friday; 16 July 2010	Saturday; 17 July 2010	Sunday; 18 July 2010
E v e n t s	50 breast (g) (semis); 50 fly (b) (semis); 400 IM (g); 200 breast (b) (semis); 200 fly (g) (semis); 400 free (b); 100 free (g) (semis); 100 back (b) (semis); 200 back (g) (semis); 50 fly (b); 50 breast (g); 1500 free (g); 4 × 100 free relay (b)	100 back (b); 400 free (g); 200 fly (b) (semis); 200 fly (g); 200 IM (b) (semis); 100 free (g); 200 breast (b); 200 back (g); 100 free (b) (semis); 200 breast (g) (semis); 1500 free (b); 4 × 100 free relay (g)	50 breast (b) (semis); 50 back (g) (semis); 200 fly (b); 200 free (g) (semis); 200 back (b) (semis); 200 breast (g); 100 free (b); 100 fly (g) (semis); 200 IM (b); 50 back (g); 50 breast (b); 800 free (g); 4 × 200 free relay (b)	50 free (disability); 50 free (g) (semis); 50 back (b) (semis); 100 back (g) (semis); 100 fly (b) (semis); 200 free (g); 200 free (b) (semis); 100 breast (g) (semis); 200 back (b); 200 IM (g) (semis); 100 breast (b) (semis); 100 fly (g); 800 free (b); 50 free (g); 50 back (b); 4 × 200 freestyle (g)	50 free (b) (semis); 50 fly (g) (semis); 400 IM (b); 100 back (g); 100 breast (b); 100 breast (g); 200 free (b); 200 IM (g); 100 fly (b); 50 fly (g); 50 free (b); 4 × 100 medley relay (g); 4 × 100 medley relay (b)

== Results ==
=== Boys ===
Games	Gold		Silver		Bronze	
50 m freestyle	Andriy Govorov; Ukraine	22.54	Jasper Aerents; Belgium	22.79	Clement Mignon; France	22.96
100 m freestyle	Yannick Agnel; France	48.80	Mehdy Metella; France	49.89	Jasper Aerents; Belgium	50.23
200 m freestyle	Yannick Agnel; France	1:46.58; CR	Andrey Ushakov; Russia	1:49.11	Daniel Skaaning; Denmark	1:50.23
400 m freestyle	Yannick Agnel; France	3:46.26; CR, NR	Sergiy Frolov; Ukraine	3:55.70	Alfie Howes; Great Britain	3:56.11
800 m freestyle	Ediz Yıldırımer; Turkey	8:03.17; NR	Sergiy Frolov; Ukraine	8:04.84	Ward Bauwens; Belgium	8:07.25
1500 m freestyle	Sergiy Frolov; Ukraine	15:20.57	Ward Bauwens; Belgium	15:27.04	Ediz Yıldırımer; Turkey	15:31.07
50 m backstroke	Christian Diener; Germany	26.03	Mateusz Zawada; Poland	26.24	Philipp Wolf; Germany	26.26
100 m backstroke	Yakov-Yan Toumarkin; Israel	55.20	Péter Bernek; Hungary	56.16	David Gamburg; Israel	56.58
200 m backstroke	Péter Bernek; Hungary	1:59.24	Balazs Zambo; Hungary	2:01.10	Yakov-Yan Toumarkin; Israel	2:01.14
50 m breaststroke	Anton Lobanov; Russia	28.37	Yaroslav Parakhin; Ukraine	28.51	Ivan Capan; Croatia	28.56
100 m breaststroke	Anton Lobanov; Russia	1:01.06	Sverre Naess; Norway	1:01.91	Christian vom Lehn; Germany	1:02.56
200 m breaststroke	Christian vom Lehn; Germany	2:12.93	Sverre Naess; Norway	2:13.77	Flavio Bizzarri; Italy	2:13.93
50 m butterfly	Andriy Govorov; Ukraine	23.58	Dmitry Pokotylo; Russia	24.50	Mehdy Metella; France	24.62
100 m butterfly	Marcin Cieślak; Poland	53.91	Mehdy Metella; France	54.08	Bence Biczó; Hungary	54.22
200 m butterfly	Bence Biczó; Hungary	1:55.82; CR	Marcin Cieślak; Poland	1:56.76	Jordan Coelho; France	1:57.57
200 m individual medley	Raphaël Stacchiotti; Luxembourg	2:02.52	Ieuan Lloyd; Great Britain	2:02.72	Ganesh Pedurand; France	2:03.39
400 m individual medley	Maksym Shemberev; Ukraine	4:20.46	Raphaël Stacchiotti; Luxembourg	4:21.28	Zsombor Szana; Hungary	4:21.53
4x100 m freestyle	France; Yannick Agnel; Clement Mignon; Lorys Bourelly; Mehdy Metella	3:19.65	Great Britain; James Disney-May; Braxston Timm; Liam Selby; James Young	3:23.97	Croatia; Ivan Levaj; Ivan Kristo; Luka Sever; Dujam Sablic	3:24.54
4x200 m freestyle	France; Lorys Bourelly; Clement Mignon; Mehdy Metella; Yannick Agnel	7:21.40	Great Britain; Braxston Timm; James Young; Liam Selby; Ieuan Lloyd	7:26.09	Russia; Dmitri Yermakov; Mikhail Ukrainskiy; Egor Degtyarev; Andrey Ushakov	7:26.91
4x100 m medley	Russia; Mikhail Zvyagin; Anton Lobanov; Dmitry Pokotylo; Andrey Ushakov	3:41.12	France; Julien Pierre Goyetche; Thomas Rabeisen; Mehdy Metella; Yannick Agnel	3:41.55	Germany; Christian Diener; Christian vom Lehn; Melvin Herrmann; Kevin Leithold	3:43.58

=== Girls ===
Games	Gold		Silver		Bronze	
50 m freestyle	Nadiya Koba; Ukraine	25.46	Silke Lippok; Germany	25.71	Béryl Gastaldello; France	25.98
100 m freestyle	Silke Lippok; Germany	55.31	Mathilde Cini; France	56.41	Alizee Merdy; France	56.55
200 m freestyle	Silke Lippok; Germany	2:00.11	Henrietta Stenkvist; Sweden	2:01.72	Valeriya Podlesna; Ukraine	2:01.76
400 m freestyle	Henrietta Stenkvist; Sweden	4:13.69	Amalie Emma Thomsen; Denmark	4:14.61	Sycerika Mc Mahon; Ireland	4:15.92
800 m freestyle	Tjasa Oder; Slovenia	8:40.06	Claudia Dasca Romeu; Spain	8:43.31	Donata Kilijanska; Poland	8:44.81
1500 m freestyle	Claudia Dasca Romeu; Spain	16:27.97	Tjasa Oder; Slovenia	16:37.98	Donata Kilijanska; Poland	16:39.03
50 m backstroke	Emma Saunders; Great Britain	29.01; CR	Daryna Zevina; Ukraine	29.12	Mathilde Cini; France	29.42
100 m backstroke	Daryna Zevina; Ukraine	1:02.05	Rachele Qualla; Italy	1:02.72	Karley Mann; Great Britain	1:02.99
200 m backstroke	Karley Mann; Great Britain	2:11.48	Daryna Zevina; Ukraine	2:11.82	Henrietta Stenkvist; Sweden	2:13.38
50 m breaststroke	Lisa Fissneider; Italy	32.20	Lina Rathsack; Germany	32.37	Sara L Lougher; Great Britain	32.48
100 m breaststroke	Marina Garcia Urzainqui; Spain	1:09.40	Lisa Fissneider; Italy	1:09.59	Jenna Laukkanen; Finland	1:10.42
200 m breaststroke	Marina Garcia Urzainqui; Spain	2:27.12	Jenna Laukkanen; Finland	2:29.67	Anastasia Sineva; Russia	2:30.00
50 m butterfly	Nadiya Koba; Ukraine	27.13	Silke Lippok; Germany	27.47	Daria Tsvetkova; Russia	27.62
100 m butterfly	Rachael Kelly; Great Britain	1:00.47	Judit Ignacio Sorribes; Spain	1:00.60	Beatrice Fassone; Italy	1:00.64
200 m butterfly	Judit Ignacio Sorribes; Spain	2:12.30	Rachael Kelly; Great Britain	2:13.43	Alisa Trukhanovich; Russia	2:15.03
200 m individual medley	Sophie Smith; Great Britain	2:14.48	Beatriz Gomez Cortes; Spain	2:14.65	Juliane Reinhold; Germany	2:15.16
400 m individual medley	Sophie Smith; Great Britain	4:44.46	Beatriz Gomez Cortes; Spain	4:44.87	Alessia Polieri; Italy	4:46.71
4x100 m freestyle	Germany; Juliane Reinhold; Teresa Baerens; Silke Lippok; Alexandra Wenk	3:46.04	Great Britain; Emma Saunders; Jessica Lloyd; Sophie Smith; Sara Hamilton	3:46.60	France; Mathilde Cini; Alizee Merdy; Béryl Gastaldello; Charlotte Bonnet	3:48.21
4x200 m freestyle	Germany; Elisa Thimm; Juliane Reinhold; Silke Lippok; Johanna Friedrich	8:06.78; CR	Great Britain; Emma Saunders; Fiona Donnelly; Rachael Williamson; Sophie Smith	8:10.21	Italy; Giorgia Crocione; Ludovica Leoni; Beatrice Magagnoli; Chiara Giacone	8:15.37
4x100 m medley	Germany; Silke Lippok; Lina Rathsack; Juliane Reinhold; Alexandra Wenk	4:08.29	Great Britain; Karley Mann; Sara L Lougher; Rachael Kelly; Emma Saunders	4:09.48	Russia; Maria Bobrovnik; Sofya Zhigunova; Alisa Trukhanovich; Mariya Reznikova	4:13.41

== Medal table ==
* Host nation (Finland)

Rank	Nation	Gold	Silver	Bronze	Total
1	Ukraine (UKR)	7	5	1	13
2	Germany (GER)	7	3	4	14
3	Great Britain (GBR)	5	7	3	15
4	France (FRA)	5	4	8	17
5	Spain (ESP)	4	4	0	8
6	Russia (RUS)	3	2	5	10
7	Hungary (HUN)	2	2	2	6
8	Italy (ITA)	1	2	4	7
9	Poland (POL)	1	2	2	5
10	Sweden (SWE)	1	1	1	3
11	Luxembourg (LUX)	1	1	0	2
11	Slovenia (SLO)	1	1	0	2
13	Israel (ISR)	1	0	2	3
14	Turkey (TUR)	1	0	1	2
15	Belgium (BEL)	0	2	2	4
16	Norway (NOR)	0	2	0	2
17	Denmark (DEN)	0	1	1	2
17	Finland (FIN)*	0	1	1	2
19	Croatia (CRO)	0	0	2	2
20	Ireland (IRL)	0	0	1	1
Totals (20 entries)		40	40	40	120
