= Ediz Yıldırımer =

Turkish swimmer (born 1993)

Personal information
- Nationality: Turkey
- Born: 25 October 1993 (age 32) Gölcük, Kocaeli Province, Turkey
- Height: 1.74 m (5 ft 8 1/2 in)
- Weight: 65 kg (143 lb)

Sport
- Sport: Swimming
- Strokes: Freestyle
- College team: University of Georgia
Medal record
Men's swimming
Representing Turkey
Islamic Solidarity Games
Bronze medal – third place	2017 Baku	800 m freestyle
Bronze medal – third place	2017 Baku	1500 m freestyle
European Junior Championships
Gold medal – first place	2010 Helsinki	800 m freestyle
Gold medal – first place	2011 Belgrade	800 m freestyle
Bronze medal – third place	2010 Helsinki	1500 m freestyle
Bronze medal – third place	2011 Belgrade	1500 m freestyle

Ediz Yıldırımer (pronounced [eˈdiz ˈjɯɫdɯˈɾɯmeɾ]; born 25 October 1993) is a Turkish freestyle swimmer competing particularly in the 800 m and 1500 m events. He represented his country at the 2008 Summer Olympics without advancing to the final. With his age of 14, he was the youngest ever Turkish athlete to take part at the Olympics.

== Early years ==
Born at Gölcük in Kocaeli Province, he began swimming at the age of six in Konya, where his family moved after the 1999 İzmit earthquake. He became there a member of Konya Firuze Swim Club, and was mentored in swimming techniques. Two years later, Yıldırımer returned to Kocaeli to join the cadets team.

== Career ==
In 2003, Yıldırımer set a national record in 100 m freestyle of his age category at the Turkish Swimming Championships that was his first competition at national level.

He accepted a scholarship offer from Tim Bauer, The Woodlands Swim Team's head coach. In 2009, he went to the United States as a foreign exchange student, and continued his high school education there. He graduated 2012 from the John Cooper School in The Woodlands, Texas. During this time, he was a member of the school team and set many records and reached to a lot of swimming accomplishments.

Yıldırımer won the gold medal in the 800 m event and the bronze medal in the 1500 m at the 2010 European Junior Swimming Championships held in Helsinki, Finland. In 2011, he repeated the same success at the European Junior Championships held in Belgrade, Serbia.

He was invited to participate in the 1500 m freestyle event at the 2012 Summer Olympics.

== Achievements ==
Year	Competition	Venue	Position	Event	Notes
2010	European Junior Championships	Helsinki, Finland	1st	800 m freestyle	8:03.17 NR
2010	European Junior Championships	Helsinki, Finland	3rd	1500 m freestyle	15:31.07
2011	European Junior Championships	Belgrade, Serbia	1st	800 m freestyle	8:00.82
2011	European Junior Championships	Belgrade, Serbia	3rd	1500 m freestyle	15:25.71
