= 2009 European Junior Swimming Championships =

Water sport competitions

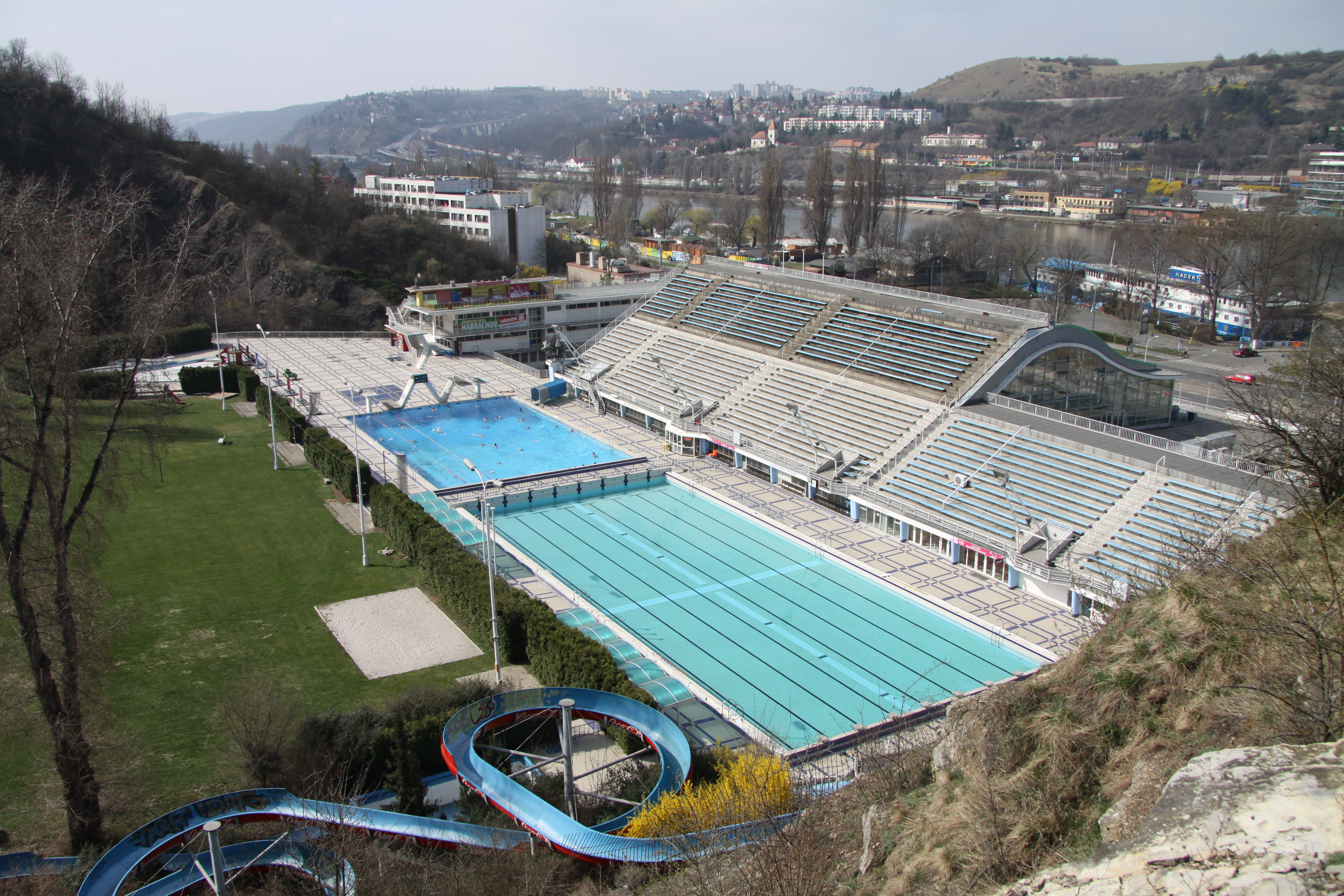
Swimming Stadium Podolí

The 2009 European Junior Swimming Championships were held from 8–12 July 2009 in Prague, Czech Republic. The age groups for this event are girls born in 1993 or 1994 and boys born in 1991 and 1992. The tournament is organized by LEN, the European Swimming League, and was held in a 50 m pool.

== Medal table ==
* Host nation (Czech Republic)

Rank	Nation	Gold	Silver	Bronze	Total
1	Italy (ITA)	10	11	9	30
2	Germany (GER)	6	5	4	15
3	France (FRA)	4	1	2	7
4	Ukraine (UKR)	4	1	0	5
5	Poland (POL)	3	1	4	8
6	Ireland (IRL)	3	0	1	4
7	Hungary (HUN)	2	8	4	14
8	Russia (RUS)	2	5	3	10
9	Great Britain (GBR)	2	2	1	5
10	Slovenia (SLO)	1	1	0	2
11	Netherlands (NED)	1	0	1	2
12	Luxembourg (LUX)	1	0	0	1
13	Spain (ESP)	0	3	4	7
14	Israel (ISR)	0	1	0	1
15	Greece (GRE)	0	0	3	3
16	Sweden (SWE)	0	0	2	2
17	Cyprus (CYP)	0	0	1	1
17	Czech Republic (CZE)*	0	0	1	1
17	Switzerland (SUI)	0	0	1	1
Totals (19 entries)		39	39	41	119

== Medal summary ==
=== Boy's events ===
Event:	Gold:	Time	Silver:	Time	Bronze:	Time
Boy's freestyle
50 m	Dominik Kozma; Hungary	22.33	Fabio Gimondi; Italy	22.61	Eric Van Dooren; Switzerland	22.65
100 m	Danila Izotov; Russia	48.48; EJR	Francesco Donin; Italy	48.80	Luca Leonardi; Italy	48.83
200 m	Yannick Agnel; France	1:47.02; EJR	Danila Izotov; Russia	1:47.77	Artem Lobuzov; Russia	1:49.18
400 m	Yannick Agnel; France	3:48.17; EJR	Péter Bernek; Hungary	3:50.53	Adrian Mantas Mota; Spain	3:52.12
800 m	Alessandro Cuoghi; Italy	8:01.87	Martin Grodzki; Germany	8:02.42	Balázs Zámbó; Hungary	8:04.34
1500 m	Gergely Gyurta; Hungary	15:14.39	Alessandro Cuoghi; Italy	15:20.52	Adrian Mantas Mota; Spain	15:24.32
Boy's backstroke
50 m	Marco Fanti Rovetta; Italy	25.49; EJR	Ádám Szilágyi; Hungary	25.75	Stefano Pizzamiglio; Italy	25.77
100 m	Marco Fanti Rovetta; Italy	55.55	Ádám Szilágyi; Hungary	55.64	Stefano Pizzamiglio; Italy	55.82
200 m	Radosław Kawęcki; Poland	1:56.65; EJR	Péter Bernek; Hungary	1:58.98	Michele Malerba; Italy	2:00.69
Boy's breaststroke
50 m	Alexander Triznov; Russia	27.34; EJR	Andrea Toniato; Italy	28.03	Petr Bartunek; Czech Republic	28.30
100 m	Andrea Toniato; Italy	1:00.97; EJR	Alexander Triznov; Russia	1:01.63	Maxim Shcherbakov; Russia	1:01.70
200 m	Christian vom Lehn; Germany	2:11.07	Maxim Shcherbakov; Russia	2:12.83	Dimitrios Koulouris; Greece	2:14.68
Boy's butterfly
50 m	Andriy Govorov; Ukraine	23.66; EJR	Tommaso Romani; Italy	24.15	Fotios Koliopoulos; Greece	24.36
100 m	Marcin Cieślak; Poland	53.00	Bence Pulai; Hungary	53.02	Philip Heintz; Germany	53.46
200 m	Marcin Cieślak; Poland	1:56.13; EJR	Nimrod Hayet; Israel	1:57.97	Zsombor Szana; Hungary	1:58.76
Boy's individual medley
200 m	Raphaël Stacchiotti; Luxembourg	2:02.56	Dominik Kozma; Hungary	2:04.05	Morten Ahme; Germany	2:04.29
400 m	Roberto Pavoni; Great Britain	4:17.27	Gergely Gyurta; Hungary	4:18.62	Zsombor Szana; Hungary	4:19.43
Boy's relays
4 × 100 m freestyle	Italy; Francesco Donin; Fabio Gimondi; Luca Leonardi; Stefano Mauro Pizzamiglio	3:16.58; EJR	France; Antton Haramboure; Lorys Bourelly; Yannick Agnel; Romain Magula	3:20.08	Germany; Joel Ax; Philip Heintz; Soeren Barthel; Rico Stoeckmann	3:22.39
4 × 200 m freestyle	France; Antton Haramboure; Thibault Bayrac; Lorys Bourelly; Yannick Agnel	7:21.15	Russia; Artem Lobuzov; Vitaly Syrnikov; Alexander Shumaylov; Danila Izotov	7:21.24	Italy; Francesco Donin; Mihai Florin Pantir; Alessandro Cuoghi; Luca Leonard	7:22.76
4 × 100 m medley	Italy; Marco Fanti Rovetta; Andrea Toniato; Stefano Mauro Pizzamiglio; Luca Leonardi	3:38.28; EJR	Russia; Dmitry Gorbunov; Alexander Triznov; Sergey Ivanov; Danila Izotov	3:40.53	Hungary; Ádám Szilágyi; Dominik Kozma; Bence Pulai; Péter Bernek	3:41.06

=== Girl's events ===
Event:	Gold:	Time	Silver:	Time	Bronze:	Time
Girl's freestyle
50 m	Silke Lippok; Germany	25.44	Silvia Di Pietro; Italy	25.59	Anna Santamans; France	25.93
100 m	Silke Lippok; Germany	55.02; EJR	Silvia Di Pietro; Italy	55.58	Camille Radou; France	55.87
200 m	Camille Radou; France	1:59.19; EJR	Silke Lippok; Germany	2:00.06	Sharon van Rouwendaal; Netherlands	2:00.59
400 m	Sharon van Rouwendaal; Netherlands	4:12.35	Stefania Pirozzi; Italy	4:13.01	Ann Morris; Great Britain	4:14.09
800 m	Gráinne Murphy; Ireland	8:36.63	Tjasa Oder; Slovenia	8:38.26	Claudia Dasca Romeu; Spain	8:40.02
1500 m	Tjasa Oder; Slovenia	16:25.57	Claudia Dasca Romeu; Spain	16:31.58	Gráinne Murphy; Ireland	16:35.93
Girl's backstroke
50 m	Mariya Tereschenko; Ukraine	29.06; EJR	Daryna Zevina; Ukraine	29.17	Klaudia Nazieblo; Poland	29.34
100 m	Daryna Zevina; Ukraine	1:01.49	Sarah Sjöström; Sweden	1:02.91	Klaudia Nazieblo; Poland	1:02.93
200 m	Daryna Zevina; Ukraine	2:10.08; EJR	Klaudia Nazieblo; Poland	2:13.08	Doerte Baumert; Germany	2:13.40
Girl's breaststroke
50 m	Ilaria Scarcella; Italy	31.71	Vanessa Grimberg; Germany	31.87	Paulina Zachoszcz; Poland	31.89
100 m	Ilaria Scarcella; Italy	1:07.49; EJR	Marina Garcia Urzainqui; Spain	1:07.63	Maria Michalaka; Greece; Paulina Zachoszcz; Poland	1:09.19
200 m	Ilaria Scarcella; Italy	2:25.02	Marina Garcia Urzainqui; Spain	2:25.05	Olga Detenyuk; Russia	2:26.76
Girl's butterfly
50 m	Silvia Di Pietro; Italy	26.33; EJR	Lena Kalla; Germany	26.74	Anna Schoholeva; Cyprus	27.10
100 m	Lena Kalla; Germany	58.76; EJR	Beatrice Fassone; Italy	59.25	Silvia Di Pietro; Italy	59.44
200 m	Mirela Olczak; Poland	2:09.32	Boglárka Kapás; Hungary	2:09.84	Denise Riccobono; Italy	2:10.31
Girl's individual medley
200 m	Gráinne Murphy; Ireland	2:14.22	Aimee Willmott; Great Britain	2:15.89	Stefania Pirozzi; Italy	2:16.11
400 m	Gráinne Murphy; Ireland	4:40.88	Aimee Willmott; Great Britain	4:44.81	Stefania Pirozzi; Italy	4:45.37
Girl's relays
4 × 100 m freestyle	Germany; Julika Niegisch; Juliane Reinhold; Lina Rathsack; Silke Lippok	3:45.27; EJR	Italy; Chiara Masini Luccetti; Alice Mizzau; Giada Galizi; Silvia Di Pietro	3:46.57	Sweden; Lovisa Ericsson; Josefin Lindqvist; Henriette Stenkvist; Michelle Coleman	3:47.30
4 × 200 m freestyle	Great Britain; Danielle Stirrat; Emma Graham; Eleanor Faulkner; Anne Bochmann	8:08.31; EJR	Germany; Juliane Reinhold; Sandra Koch; Katharina David; Silke Lippok	8:10.47	Sweden; Sarah Sjöström; Henrietta Stenqvist; Lovisa Ericsson; Michelle Coleman	8:10.57
4 × 100 m medley	Germany; Doerte Baumert; Vanessa Grimberg; Lena Kalla; Silke Lippok	4:05.59; EJR	Italy; Rachele Qualla; Ilaria Scarcella; Beatrice Fassone; Silvia Di Pietro	4:08.03	Spain; Eva Plaza Ortega; Marina Garcia Urzainqui; Aida Marti Arasa Anna; Judit Ignacio Sorribes	4:10.49
