= Gráinne Murphy =

Irish swimmer (born 1993)

Personal information
- Full name: Gráinne Murphy
- Nationality: Irish
- Born: 26 March 1993 (age 33) Wexford, Ireland

Sport
- Sport: Swimming
- Club: High Performance Centre UL / Limerick SC
Medal record
European Championships (LC)
Silver medal – second place	2010 Budapest	1500 m freestyle
European Championships (SC)
Bronze medal – third place	2010 Eindhoven	400 m freestyle
Bronze medal – third place	2010 Eindhoven	800 m freestyle
European Junior Championships
Gold medal – first place	2009 Prague	200 m medley
Gold medal – first place	2009 Prague	400 m medley
Gold medal – first place	2009 Prague	800 m freestyle
Bronze medal – third place	2009 Prague	1500 m freestyle

Gráinne Murphy (born 26 March 1993) is a former swimmer who represented Ireland at international level. She qualified for the 2012 Summer Olympics in London, though due to illness only swam the heats of the 400m Freestyle. She was forced to withdraw from the rest of the meet, including her focus event (the 800m Freestyle), where she would have been in contention for a place in the final.

== Career ==
Murphy hails from Ballinaboola, New Ross, County Wexford. An accomplished junior athlete, she won three gold medals and one bronze at the 2009 European Junior Swimming Championships and was awarded Texaco Young Sportstar Award 2009.

Murphy has also been successful at senior level, winning a silver medal in the 1,500 metres Freestyle at the 2010 European Aquatics Championships, ahead of Erika Villaécija García and behind '09 World Championship Silver Medallist, Lotte Friis. She is also the current holder of the Irish record for that event.

Murphy then competed in the 2010 European Short Course Swimming Championships in Eindhoven. She took bronze in 400 m freestyle behind Melanie Costa and Ágnes Mutina. She also claimed bronze in the 800 m freestyle, behind Federica Pellegrini and Boglárka Kapás. She was shortlisted for RTÉ Sports Person of the Year in 2010.

On 3 December 2011, she qualified for the 2012 Summer Olympics in London. However, on 31 July 2012, after swimming in the heats of the 400m freestyle, she revealed that she had been suffering from glandular fever and it forced her to withdraw from the rest of the competition. She had been a contender to make the final of her favoured event, the 800m freestyle, and had withdrawn from the 200m Freestyle earlier in the meet to conserve her health and energy for that race.

Prior to London 2012 she was based at the High Performance centre at the University of Limerick. However, in the aftermath of the games she has returned to her hometown of New Ross, County Wexford to continue her training after her coach Ronald Claes was fired from his post of High Performance Coach.

She retired from swimming in 2015 due to a combination of lung infection and tonsillitis.

== See also ==
- Gráinne (given name)
