= Nadiya Koba =

Ukrainian swimmer (born 1995)

Personal information
- Native name: Надія Коба
- Nationality: Ukrainian
- Born: 25 April 1995 (age 31) Luhansk, Ukraine

Sport
- Sport: Swimming
- Strokes: Butterfly and Freestyle
Medal record
Women's swimming
Representing Ukraine
European Junior Championships
Gold medal – first place	2010 Helsinki	50 m butterfly
Gold medal – first place	2010 Helsinki	50 m freestyle
Gold medal – first place	2011 Belgrade	50 m freestyle

Nadiya Koba (Ukrainian: Надія Коба; born 25 April 1995) is a retired Ukrainian swimmer.

== Early life ==
She was born on 25 April 1995 in Luhansk, Ukraine.

== Career ==
In 2010, Nadiya competed at the 2010 European Junior Swimming Championships, held in Helsinki, Finland, where she became twice gold medalist in 50 m freestyle and 50 m butterfly.

At the next European Junior Swimming Championships, held in Belgrade, Nadiya received a third gold medal in 50 m freestyle.

She competed at the 2010 European Short Course Swimming Championships and 2011 European Short Course Swimming Championships in 50 m and 100 m freestyle, 4x50 m freestyle relay without reaching any medals.
