= Sophie Allen =

English swimmer (born 1992)

Personal information
- Full name: Sophie Allen
- National team: Great Britain
- Born: 21 March 1992 (age 34) Lincoln, England
- Height: 1.70 m (5 ft 7 in)
- Weight: 65 kg (143 lb; 10.2 st)

Sport
- Sport: Swimming
- Strokes: Medley
- Club: Stockport Metro
Medal record
Women's swimming
Representing Great Britain
European Championships (LC)
Silver medal – second place	2012 Debrecen	200 m medley
European Championships (SC)
Bronze medal – third place	2013 Herning	Women's 200 metre individual medley
Bronze medal – third place	2013 Herning	Women's 4 × 50 m medley relay

Sophie Nicole Allen (born 21 March 1992) is an English competition swimmer who has represented Great Britain in the Olympics and European championships. She swam at the 2012 Summer Olympics in the 200-metre individual medley. She won a silver medal in that same event during the 2012 European Aquatics Championships.

== Swimming Career ==
Following a 2008 European Junior Championships silver medal in the 200 m individual medley, she qualified for the 2012 Summer Olympics in the same event by coming second in the Olympic trials. As well competing in the Olympics, in 2012 she won the silver medal at the European Aquatics Championships. She was also part of the Great Britain team that set a new national record in the short course 4 x 100 m medley relay at the 2012 Short Course World Championship.

In 2013, she was part of the Great Britain team that won the bronze medal in the 4 x 50 m relay event at the 2013 European Short Course Swimming Championships, setting a new British record. At the same championship, she also won individual bronze in the 200 m medley.

In 2014, she won bronze in event at the British Championships. That year, she took part in the Commonwealth Games, finishing 6th in the 200 m individual medley.
