= Ioannis Drymonakos =

Greek swimmer (born 1984)

Personal information
- Full name: Ioannis Drymonakos
- Nationality: Greece
- Born: 18 January 1984 (age 42) Athens, Greece
- Height: 1.90 m (6 ft 3 in)
- Weight: 84 kg (185 lb)

Sport
- Sport: Swimming
- Strokes: Butterfly Individual Medley
- Club: G.S. Peristeri
Medal record
World Championships (SC)
Bronze medal – third place	2008 Manchester	400 m medley
Swimming World Cup (SC)
Bronze medal – third place	2007 Berlin	400 m medley
World Masters Championships
Gold medal – first place	2024 Doha	200 m butterfly
Gold medal – first place	2024 Doha	400 m medley
Gold medal – first place	2019 Gwangju	200 m medley
Gold medal – first place	2019 Gwangju	400 m medley
Silver medal – second place	2024 Doha	200 m medley
Silver medal – second place	2019 Gwangju	100 m butterfly
Bronze medal – third place	2024 Doha	100 m butterfly
European Championships (LC)
Gold medal – first place	2008 Eindhoven	200 m butterfly
Silver medal – second place	2008 Eindhoven	400 m medley
Silver medal – second place	2006 Budapest	200 m butterfly
Bronze medal – third place	2012 Debrecen	200 m butterfly
Bronze medal – third place	2012 Debrecen	400 m medley
Bronze medal – third place	2010 Budapest	200 m butterfly
European Championships (SC)
Bronze medal – third place	2007 Debrecen	200 m butterfly
Bronze medal – third place	2007 Debrecen	400 m medley
Bronze medal – third place	2006 Helsinki	400 m medley
Mediterranean Games
Gold medal – first place	2005 Almería	200 m butterfly
Bronze medal – third place	2005 Almería	400 m medley

Ioannis Drymonakos (born 18 January 1984) is a Greek swimmer from Athens. He became the first ever Greek swimmer to hold a European swimming record by clocking a time of 1:54.16 seconds in 200 m butterfly event of the 2008 European Aquatics Championships final on 21 March 2008.

In 2008, a few days before the Beijing Olympic Games he tested positive for banned drugs during a doping-control test.

He was then acquitted of all charges for use of banned substances by the court, that decided it was impossible for him to procure the substance M3 [11]. He came back in 2010 winning the bronze medal at the European Championship in Budapest in the event of 200 m butterfly.

In 2012 he won two more bronze medals at the European Championship in Debrecen. At the 2012 Summer Olympics in London, he competed in the 200-meter butterfly where he made the semi-final and placed 15th overall.

In 2015, Ioannis Drymonakos participated at the Arena Pro Swim Series at Charlotte by U.S.A swimming during his effort to get to 2016 Summer Olympics and taking the competitive advantage among many distinguished athletes such as Michael Phelps. He competed in Friday's (15 May) 400 meters Men IM making it in 04:20.26 and breaking his personal record for over 2 seconds to hold the 4th place. On Saturday's (16 May) 200 meters Men Butterfly made it in 1:59:61 holding the 5th place.

In 2018 he competed in the Survivor reality contest.

== Sources ==
- Giota Kounali, "duo-fores-nikhse-ton-felps-o-drymwnakos", Sport24.gr, Athens 2015.
