= Bence Biczó =

Hungarian swimmer (born 1993)

Personal information
- Nationality: Hungarian
- Born: 19 January 1993 (age 33) Pécs, Hungary
- Height: 1.83 m (6 ft 0 in)
- Weight: 74 kg (163 lb)

Sport
- Sport: Swimming
- Strokes: Butterfly
- Club: Pécsi VSE ( –2012); Debreceni SSI (2012–2016); BVSC-Zugló (2016–2017); Ferencvárosi TC (2017– )
- Coach: Béla Sántics ( –2016); Ákos Molnár (2016– )
Medal record
Representing Hungary
Men's swimming
Event	1st	2nd	3rd
Youth Olympics	1	0	0
European Championships (LC)	0	2	0
European Championship (SC)	0	0	1
European Junior Championship (LC)	2	0	1
Total	3	2	2
Youth Olympic Games
Gold medal – first place	2010 Singapore	200 m butterfly
European Championships (LC)
Silver medal – second place	2012 Debrecen	200 m butterfly
Silver medal – second place	2014 Berlin	200 m butterfly
European Championship (SC)
Bronze medal – third place	2010 Eindhoven	200 m butterfly
European Junior Championship (LC)
Gold medal – first place	2010 Helsinki	200 m butterfly
Gold medal – first place	2011 Belgrade	200 m butterfly
Bronze medal – third place	2010 Helsinki	100 m butterfly

Bence Biczó (born 19 January 1993) is a Hungarian swimmer and Youth Olympic Games gold medalist.

Biczó began swimming in 1999 and soon stood out with his talent. For 2005 he held almost all county records in his age group. To ensure his further development, in 2007 he moved with his family to Pécs, where he currently trains at the Pécsi Városi Sportiskola.

Biczó achieved his first success on the 2010 European Youth Swimming Championship, where he triumphed in the 200 m butterfly with a new youth record time of 1:55.82, which was the sixth best overall result in that year. Few months later, he has won the same event on the first Youth Olympic Games in Singapore, closing his record time to seventh hundredths (1:55.89). In November he participated on the 2010 European Short Course Swimming Championships, winning a bronze medal in his favourite stroke.

In 2011 Biczó further improved his personal best, as he swam 1:54.79 on the Hungarian championship and won the race ahead of László Cseh, the defending champion and Olympic silver medalist of the discipline in 2008.
