= Christian Diener =

German swimmer

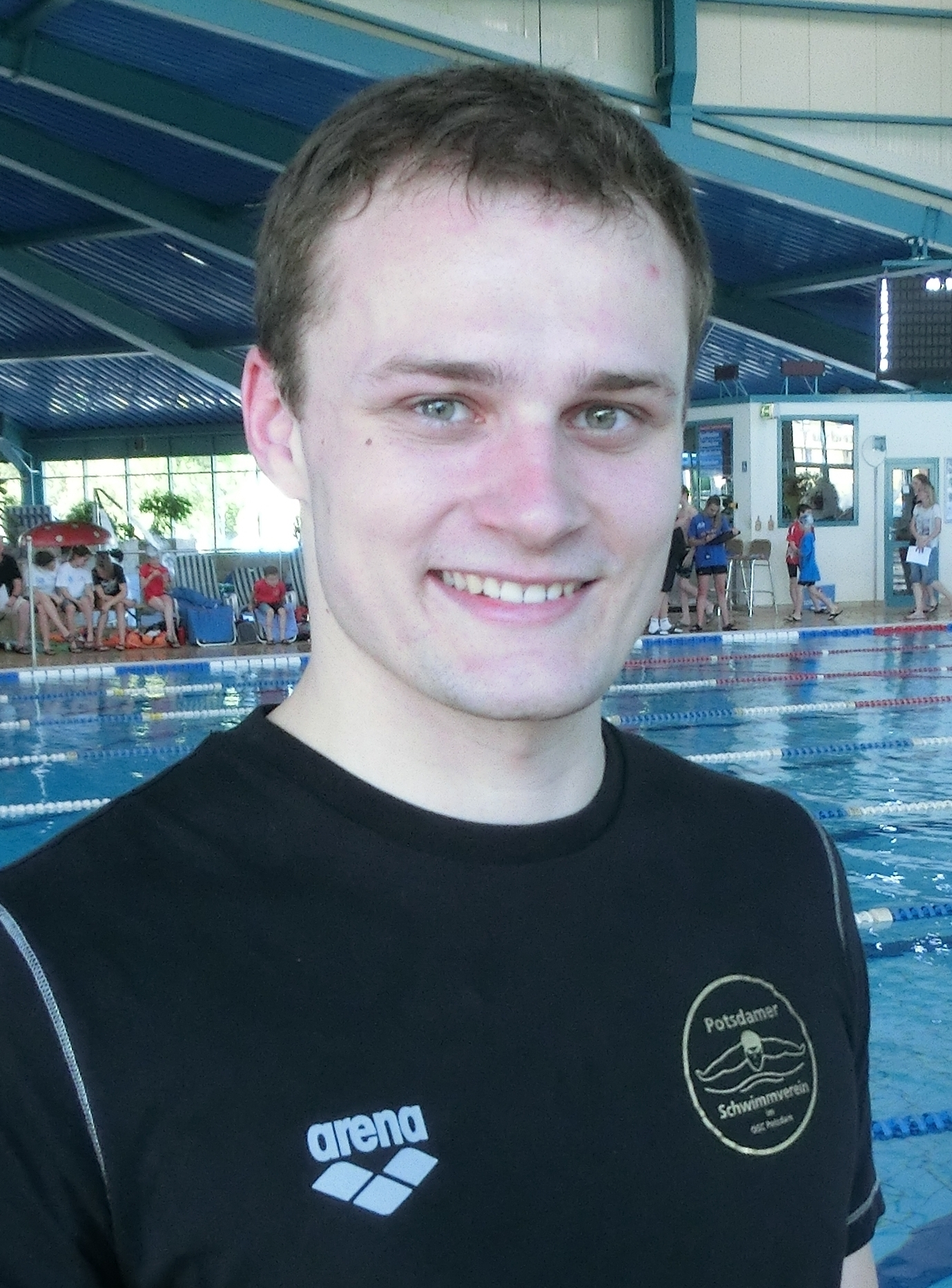
- Diener in 2018

Personal information
- Nationality: German
- Born: 3 June 1993 (age 33) Cottbus, Germany
- Height: 1.83 m (6 ft 0 in)
- Weight: 85 kg (187 lb)

Sport
- Sport: Swimming
- Strokes: Backstroke
- Club: Potsdamer SV
Medal record
Representing Germany
World Championships (SC)
Silver medal – second place	2021 Abu Dhabi	50 m backstroke
European Championships (LC)
Silver medal – second place	2014 Berlin	200 m backstroke
Bronze medal – third place	2018 Glasgow	4×100 m medley
European Championships (SC)
Gold medal – first place	2013 Herning	4×50 m mixed medley
Silver medal – second place	2013 Herning	50 m backstroke
Silver medal – second place	2013 Herning	4×50 m medley
Silver medal – second place	2019 Glasgow	50 m backstroke
Silver medal – second place	2019 Glasgow	100 m backstroke
Silver medal – second place	2019 Glasgow	200 m backstroke
Bronze medal – third place	2011 Szczecin	4×50 m medley
Bronze medal – third place	2013 Herning	200 m backstroke
Bronze medal – third place	2013 Herning	4×50 m medley
Youth Olympic Games
Bronze medal – third place	2010 Singapore	4×100 m medley
World Junior Championships
Gold medal – first place	2011 Lima	50 m backstroke
European Junior Championships
Gold medal – first place	2011 Belgrade	50 m backstroke
Gold medal – first place	2011 Belgrade	100 m backstroke
Gold medal – first place	2011 Belgrade	200 m backstroke
Silver medal – second place	2011 Belgrade	4×100 m medley

Christian Diener (born 3 June 1993) is a German backstroke swimmer. Jörg Hoffmann is his coach.

Diener won his first international championship title at the European Junior Championships 2010 in the 50m backstroke. One year later, in 2011, he defended his gold medal and won also in 100m and 200m backstroke at the European Junior Championships in Belgrade (Serbia) and won a gold medal at the World Junior Championships in Lima (Peru) in 50m backstroke. Christian Diener won silver in 50m backstroke at European Short Course Swimming Championships 2013 and 2014 at European Aquatics Championships. He was a member of the German team at the 2016 Summer Olympics in Rio de Janeiro and competed in the 200m backstroke, finishing 7th.

== Career ==
=== Summer Olympics ===
2016 Summer Olympics in Rio de Janeiro (Brazil)

- Rank 7 in 200m backstroke

2010 Summer Youth Olympics in Singapore

- Bronze in 4 × 100 m European Aquatics Championships (as backstroke swimmer)

=== World Championships ===
2015 World Aquatics Championships in Kazan (Russia):

- Rank 9 in 200m backstroke
- Rank 24 in 100m backstroke

2014 Short Course World Swimming Championships in Doha (Qatar)

- Rank 5 in 100m backstroke
- Rank 7 in 4 × 50 m European Aquatics Championships mixed (as backstroke swimmer)
- Rank 8 in 4 × 100 m European Aquatics Championships
- Rank 11 in 200m backstroke
- Rank 13 in 50m backstroke

2014 CISM Military World Championships in Tenero (Switzerland)

- Gold in 200m backstroke (new CISM world record)
- Gold in 100m backstroke
- Gold in 4 × 100 m European Aquatics Championships (as backstroke swimmer)
- Bronze in 50m backstroke

2012 Short Course World Swimming Championships in Istanbul (Turkey)

- Rank 8 in 100m backstroke
- Rank 8 in 200m backstroke
- Rank 15 in 50m backstroke

2011 World Junior Championships in Lima (Peru)

- Gold in 50m backstroke (new World Junior Championships Record)

2009 ISF World Schools Championships in Antalya (Turkey)

- Gold in 50m backstroke
- Gold in 4 × 50 m European Aquatics Championships (as backstroke swimmer)
- Gold in 6 × 50 m freestyle relay
- Silver in 50m butterfly

=== European Championships ===
2014 European Aquatics Championships in Berlin (Germany)

- Silver in 200m backstroke
- Rank 4 in 100m backstroke

2013 European Short Course Swimming Championships in Herning (Denmark)

- Gold in 4 × 50 m medley relay mixed (as backstroke swimmer)
- Silver in 50m backstroke
- Bronze in 200m backstroke
- Bronze in 4 × 50 m medley relay (as backstroke swimmer)
- Rank 5 in 100m backstroke

2012 European Short Course Swimming Championships in Chartres (France):

- Rank 4 in 200m backstroke
- Rank 5 in 50m backstroke
- Rank 6 in 100m backstroke
- Rank 6 in 4 × 50 m medley relay Mixed

2012 European Aquatics Championships in Debrecen (Hungary)

- Rank 9 in 50m backstroke
- Rank 15 in 200m Rücken
- Rank 17 in 100m Rücken

2011 European Short Course Swimming Championships in Szczecin (Poland)

- Bronze in 4 × 50 m medley relay (as backstroke swimmer)
- Rank 4 in 50m backstroke
- Rank 6 in 100m backstroke

2011 European Junior Swimming Championships in Belgrad (Serbia)

- Gold in 50m backstroke (mit Deutschen Altersklassenrekord und JEM-Rekord)
- Gold in 100m backstroke
- Gold in 200m backstroke
- Silver in 4 × 100 m European Aquatics Championships (as backstroke swimmer)

2010 European Junior Swimming Championships in Helsinki (Finland)

- Gold in 50m Rücken
- Bronze in 4 × 100 m medley relay (as backstroke swimmer)

=== German National Championships ===
2014 German National Short Course Championships in Wuppertal (Germany)

- Gold in 50m backstroke
- Gold in 100m backstroke
- Gold in 200m backstroke
- Gold in 4 × 50 m freestyle relay
- Gold in 4 × 50 m medley relay (as backstroke swimmer)

2014 German National Championships in Berlin (Germany)

- Silver in 100m backstroke
- Silver in 200m backstroke
- Bronze in 50m backstroke

2013 German National Short Course Championships in Wuppertal (Germany)

- Gold in 50m backstroke
- Gold in 100m backstroke
- Gold in 200m backstroke

2012 German National Championships in Berlin (Germany)

- Rank 4 in 100m backstroke
- Rank 4 in 200m backstroke

2011 German National Short Course Championships in Wuppertal (Germany)

- Gold in 50m backstroke
- Gold in 100m backstroke
- Gold in 200m backstroke

2011 German National Championships in Berlin (Germany)

- Silver in 50m backstroke

2010 German National Short Course Championships in Wuppertal (Germany)

- Silver in 50m backstroke
