= Lisa Zaiser =

Austrian swimmer

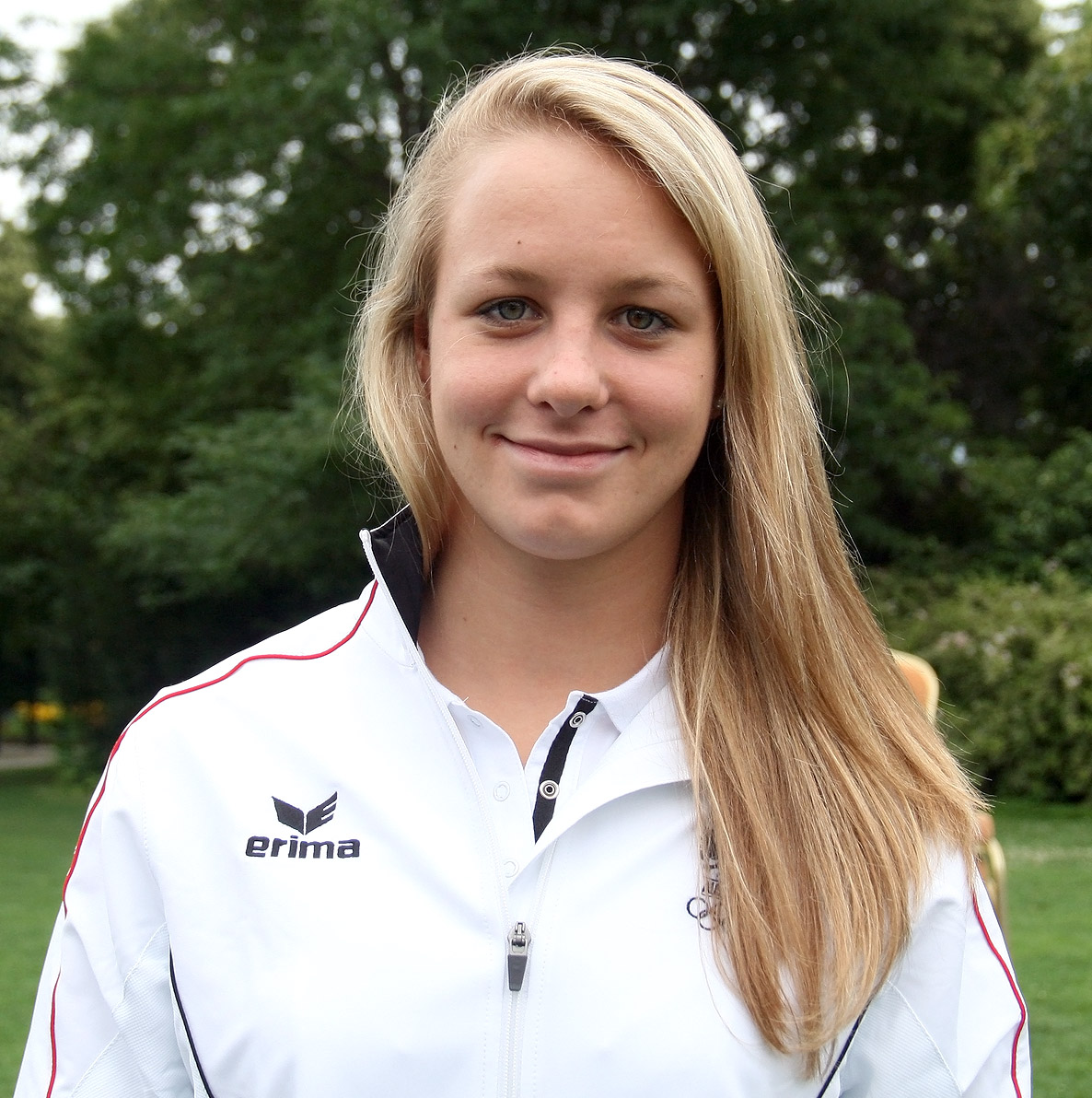

Personal information
- Nationality: Austria
- Born: 23 August 1994 (age 32) Spittal, Kärnten, Austria
- Height: 1.74 m (5 ft 8 1/2 in)
- Weight: 63 kg (139 lb)

Sport
- Sport: Swimming
- Strokes: Individual medley
- Club: ASV Linz
- Coach: Marco Wolf
Medal record
European Championships
Bronze medal – third place	2014 Berlin	200 m medley

Lisa Zaiser (born 23 August 1994) is an Austrian swimmer, who specialized in individual medley events. Zaiser held an Austrian record time of 1:00.77 by finishing seventh in the women's 100 m individual medley at the 2011 European Short Course Swimming Championships in Szczecin, Poland. Zaiser is a member of Volksbank-Spittal Swimming Club German: Schwimmverein-Volksbank Spittal) in Spittal an der Drau, Carinthia, and is coached and trained by Ferdinand Kendi.

Zaiser qualified for the women's 200 m individual medley, as the youngest member of the Austrian swimming team (aged 17), at the 2012 Summer Olympics in London, by clearing a FINA B-standard entry time of 2:14.09 from the Austrian Indoor National Championships in Graz. She challenged seven other swimmers on the second heat, including Ireland's Sycerika McMahon and Iceland's Eygló Ósk Gústafsdóttir, both of whom shared the same age with Zaiser. She raced to second place by a hundredth of a second (0.01) behind Ukrainian swimmer and two-time Olympian Hanna Dzerkal, outside her qualified entry time of 2:14.56. Zaiser failed to advance into the semifinals, as she placed nineteenth overall out of 34 swimmers in the preliminary heats.
