= 2011 European Junior Swimming Championships =

Water sport competitions

The 2011 European Junior Swimming Championships were held from 6–10 July 2011 in Belgrade, Serbia. The Championships were organized by Ligue Européenne de Natation (LEN), the European Swimming League, and were held in a 50-meter pool. Per LEN rules, competitors were aged 15 or 16 for girls and 17 or 18 for boys.

== Results ==
=== Boys ===
Games	Gold		Silver		Bronze	
50 m freestyle	Aitor Martínez; Spain	22.64	Mihael Vukić; Croatia; Kristian Golomeev; Greece	22.86	None awarded	
100 m freestyle	Velimir Stjepanović; Serbia	49.56	Arseni Kukharau; Belarus	49.83	Uvis Kalnins; Latvia	50.18
200 m freestyle	Christian Scheruebl; Austria	1:49.51	Daniel Skaaning; Denmark	1:49.56	Pawel Werner; Poland	1:49.93
400 m freestyle	Christian Scheruebl; Austria	3:51.75	Gabriele Detti; Italy	3:52.05	Michal Szuba; Poland	3:52.77
800 m freestyle	Ediz Yıldırımer; Turkey	8:00.82	Gabriele Detti; Italy	8:00.95	Gregorio Paltrinieri; Italy	8:01.31
1500 m freestyle	Gregorio Paltrinieri; Italy	15:12.16	Gabriele Detti; Italy	15:16.86	Ediz Yıldırımer; Turkey	15:25.71
50 m backstroke	Christian Diener; Germany	25.40; CR	Niccolo Bonacchi; Italy	25.56	Richárd Bohus; Hungary	25.70
100 m backstroke	Christian Diener; Germany	55.07	Niccolo Bonacchi; Italy	55.59	Fabio Laugeni; Italy	55.69
200 m backstroke	Christian Diener; Germany	1:59.94	Mateusz Wysoczynski; Poland	2:01.18	Fabio Laugeni; Italy	2:01.59
50 m breaststroke	Panagiotis Samilidis; Greece	27.89	Bastian Vollmer; Germany	28.52	Oleg Utekhin; Russia	28.54
100 m breaststroke	Panagiotis Samilidis; Greece	1:01.13	Craig Benson; Great Britain	1:02.17	Olexiy Rozhkov; Ukraine	1:02.27
200 m breaststroke	Flavio Bizzarri; Italy	2:12.43	Matti Mattsson; Finland	2:12.65	Maxym Shemberyev; Ukraine	2:12.84
50 m butterfly	Mihael Vukić; Croatia	23.90	Evgeny Koptelov; Ukraine	24.50	Matthias Bellance; France	24.56
100 m butterfly	Velimir Stjepanović; Serbia	53.79	Evgeny Koptelov; Ukraine	53.94	Martino Lucatello; Italy	53.96
200 m butterfly	Bence Biczó; Hungary	1:56.25	Andrey Tambovskiy; Russia	1:58.73	Tom Kremer; Israel	2:00.52
200 m individual medley	Ieuan Lloyd; Great Britain	2:01.57	Dan Wallace; Great Britain	2:02.41	Andreas Vazaios; Greece	2:02.51
400 m individual medley	Maxym Shemberyev; Ukraine	4:16.94	Eduardo Solaeche Gomez; Spain	4:20.36	Dan Wallace; Great Britain	4:20.60
4x100 m freestyle	Italy; Maurizio Mottola; Francesco Bellacci; Giacomo Ferri; Damiano Corapi	3:23.13	Spain; Eduardo Solaeche Gomez; Jorge Martin Lozoya; Aitor Martínez; Albert Puig Garrich	3:23.27	Germany; Max Mral; Steffen Hillmer; Matthias Lindenbauer; Maximilian Oswald	3:23.34
4x200 m freestyle	United Kingdom; Thomas Moss; Matthew Parks; Myles Crouch-Anderson; Ieuan Lloyd	7:23.36	Russia; Alexander Klyukin; Sergey Groshev; Nikita Kitaev; Dmitry Ermakov	7:23.77	Poland; Pawel Werner; Radoslaw Bor; Filip Bujoczek; Michal Poprawa	7:24.07
4x100 m medley	Italy; Niccolo Bonacchi; Martino Lucatello; Roberto Parisi; Giacomo Ferri	3:42.01	Germany; Christian Diener; Marius Kusch; Paul Wiechhusen; Max Mral	3:42.57	Russia; Dmitry Stepanenko; Andrey Tambovskiy; Nikolay Klepikov; Dmitry Ermakov	3:42.82

=== Girls ===
Games	Gold		Silver		Bronze	
50 m freestyle	Nadiya Koba; Ukraine	25.76	Louise Hansson; Sweden	25.94	Ylenia Sciarrini; Italy	25.99
100 m freestyle	Charlotte Bonnet; France	55.25	Mie OE. Nielsen; Denmark	56.01	Jessica Lloyd; Great Britain	56.19
200 m freestyle	Ksenia Yuskova; Russia	2:00.50	Sycerika Mc Mahon; Ireland	2:00.61	Esmee Vermeulen; Netherlands	2:01.22
400 m freestyle	Sycerika Mc Mahon; Ireland	4:13.85	Rachael Williamson; Great Britain	4:14.49	Johanna Friedrich; Germany	4:14.59
800 m freestyle	Donata Kilijanska; Poland	8:40.48	Esmee Vermeulen; Netherlands	8:43.56	Rachael Williamson; Great Britain	8:44.10
1500 m freestyle	María Vilas; Spain	16:32.68	Giulia Gabbrielleschi; Italy	16:37.94	Donata Kilijanska; Poland	16:38.90
50 m backstroke	Mie OE. Nielsen; Denmark	28.81	Lauren Quigley; Great Britain	28.93	Katarzyna Gorniak; Poland	29.23
100 m backstroke	Mie OE. Nielsen; Denmark	1:02.50	Jessica Fullalove; Great Britain	1:02.75	Lidon Munoz Del Campo; Spain	1:03.15
200 m backstroke	Federica Meloni; Italy	2:14.88	Osk Gustafsdottir Eyglo; Iceland	2:14.95	Phoebe Lenderyou; Great Britain	2:15.53
50 m breaststroke	Sycerika Mc Mahon; Ireland	32.00	Anna Sztankovics; Hungary	32.02	Jenna Laukkanen; Finland	32.11
100 m breaststroke	Anna Sztankovics; Hungary	1:09.31	Jenna Laukkanen; Finland	1:09.48	Irina Novikova; Russia	1:09.62
200 m breaststroke	Maria Temnikova; Russia	2:26.29	Irina Novikova; Russia	2:26.46	Molly Renshaw; Great Britain	2:28.68
50 m butterfly	Louise Hansson; Sweden	27.04	Daria Tcvetkova; Russia	27.06	Svetlana Chimrova; Russia	27.22
100 m butterfly	Alexandra Wenk; Germany	59.85	Daria Tcvetkova; Russia	1:00.14	Georgia Barton; Great Britain	1:00.53
200 m butterfly	Elena Sheridan; Great Britain	2:10.40	Liliána Szilágyi; Hungary	2:10.95	Georgia Barton; Great Britain	2:12.27
200 m individual medley	Siobhan-Marie O'Connor; Great Britain	2:14.71	Sara Joo; Hungary	2:16.34	Anastasia Sineva; Russia	2:16.44
400 m individual medley	Siobhan-Marie O'Connor; Great Britain	4:46.61	Sara Joo; Hungary	4:48.25	Reka Gyorgy; Hungary	4:49.80
4x100 m freestyle	France; Camille Gheorghiu; Assia Touati; Béryl Gastaldello; Charlotte Bonnet	3:44.66; CR	United Kingdom; Siobhan-Marie O'Connor; Chloe Tutton; Amelia Maughan; Jessica Lloyd	3:46.42	Spain; Lidon Munoz Del Campo; Marta Gonzalez Crivillers; Laura Galvez Sole; Marina Rico Fuentes	3:47.80
4x200 m freestyle	France; Camille Gheorghiu; Assia Touati; Charlotte Van Andringa; Margaux Verger Gourson	8:07.63	Russia; Elena Serko; Alena Kudryashova; Valeriya Kolotushkina; Ksenia Yuskova	8:09.51	Spain; Lidon Munoz Del Campo; Marina Rico Fuentes; Irene Andrea Lope; Catalina Corro Lorente	8:12.23
4x100 m medley	United Kingdom; Jessica Fullalove; Georgia Barton; Siobhan-Marie O'Connor; Jessica Lloyd	4:09.34	Russia; Julia Larina; Daria Tcvetkova; Irina Novikova; Ksenia Yuskova	4:10.38	Denmark; Mie OE. Nielsen; Christina Munkholm; Cecilie Holten; Kia Hansen	4:11.27

== Medal table ==
* Host nation (Serbia)

Rank	Nation	Gold	Silver	Bronze	Total
1	Great Britain (GBR)	6	6	7	19
2	Italy (ITA)	5	6	5	16
3	Germany (GER)	4	2	2	8
4	France (FRA)	3	0	1	4
5	Russia (RUS)	2	7	5	14
6	Hungary (HUN)	2	4	2	8
7	Spain (ESP)	2	2	3	7
8	Ukraine (UKR)	2	2	2	6
9	Denmark (DEN)	2	2	1	5
10	Greece (GRE)	2	1	1	4
11	Ireland (IRL)	2	1	0	3
12	Austria (AUT)	2	0	0	2
12	Serbia (SRB)*	2	0	0	2
14	Poland (POL)	1	1	5	7
15	Croatia (CRO)	1	1	0	2
15	Sweden (SWE)	1	1	0	2
17	Turkey (TUR)	1	0	1	2
18	Finland (FIN)	0	2	1	3
19	Netherlands (NED)	0	1	1	2
20	Belarus (BLR)	0	1	0	1
20	Iceland (ISL)	0	1	0	1
22	Israel (ISR)	0	0	1	1
22	Latvia (LAT)	0	0	1	1
Totals (23 entries)		40	41	39	120

== Participating countries ==
43 countries will take part in 2011 European Junior Swimming Championships with total of 505 swimmers.

- Armenia
- Austria
- Belarus
- Belgium
- Bosnia and Herzegovina
- Bulgaria
- Croatia
- Cyprus
- Czech Republic
- Denmark
- Estonia
- Faroe Islands
- Finland
- France
- Germany
- Greece
- Hungary
- Iceland
- Ireland
- Israel
- Italy
- Latvia
- Liechtenstein
- Lithuania
- Luxembourg
- Moldova
- Macedonia
- Montenegro
- Netherlands
- Norway
- Poland
- Portugal
- Romania
- Russia
- Slovakia
- Slovenia
- Spain
- Serbia
- Sweden
- Switzerland
- Turkey
- Ukraine
- United Kingdom
