= Francesco Saverio Pavone =

Italian magistrate (1944–2020)

- Born: 25 March 1944; Taranto, Italy
- Died: 16 March 2020 (aged 75); Mestre, Italy
- Occupation: Magistrate

Francesco Saverio Pavone (25 March 1944 – 16 March 2020) was the Italian magistrate, chief of the Procura di Venezia for several years.

== Biography ==
Born in Taranto on 25 March 1944, he worked for several years as a clerk of the court, where he had won a competitive examination in the late 1970s. In 1980, he took up service in the courthouse in Venice, first in the role of judge in the court and then as prosecutor. In the lagoon city he dealt with investigations on organized crime and kidnappings. In 1988, Pavone's "pool" (group of magistrates in the same case) brought to light the complete organization chart of the Mala del Brenta which was wreaking havoc in Veneto, investigations that led in 1994 to the trial that dismantled the Mala del Brenta, with Felice Maniero sentenced to 33 years for mafia association. Francesco Saverio Pavone lived under escort from 1989 to 2006, having received threats by the Sicilian Mafia and members of the Mala del Brenta. In 2016, he retired as chief prosecutor of Belluno.

On 16 March 2020, Pavone died in the intensive care unit of the Mestre Angelo hospital at the age of 75, after testing positive to COVID-19, which caused him serious lung problems.
