= Ieuan Lloyd =

Welsh swimmer

Personal information
- Full name: Ieuan David Lloyd
- National team: Great Britain
- Born: 9 July 1993 (age 33) Penarth, Wales
- Height: 1.93 m (6 ft 4 in)
- Weight: 83 kg (183 lb; 13.1 st)

Sport
- Sport: Swimming
- Strokes: Freestyle, Individual medley
- Club: City of Cardiff
Medal record
Men's swimming
Representing Great Britain
European Youth Olympic Festival
Gold medal – first place	2009 Tampere	200 m medley
Commonwealth Youth Games
Gold medal – first place	2011 Isle of Man	200 m individual medley
Gold medal – first place	2011 Isle of Man	200 m Freestyle
Gold medal – first place	2011 Isle of Man	4 x 200 m Freestyle
Silver medal – second place	2011 Isle of Man	100 m freestyle
Bronze medal – third place	2011 Isle of Man	400 m freestyle
European Junior Championships
Gold medal – first place	2011 Belgrade	200 m medley
Gold medal – first place	2011 Belgrade	4x200 m freestyle
Silver medal – second place	2010 Helsinki	200 m medley

Ieuan David Lloyd (born 9 July 1993) is a Welsh competitive swimmer. He competed in both the 2012 London Olympics and the 2016 Rio Olympics for Team GB.

== Biography ==
Born just outside Cardiff in 1993, Lloyd found his enthusiasm for swimming early on. At the age of 11 he attended Stanwell School where he stayed until completing his A-levels in 2011, obtaining A grades in Chemistry, Biology and Maths. He now lives in the city of Cardiff. He is proficient in both English and Welsh.

In 2009 he competed in the European Youth Olympic Festival in Tampere, Finland, winning Gold in the under-16s men's 200m individual medley at the age of 15.

He competed at the 2012 Summer Olympics in the Men's 200 metre freestyle, finishing in 19th place in the heats, failing to qualify for the semifinals. On 31 July he competed in the 4 × 200 m swimming relay race where the team qualified for the final but finished 6th with a time of 7 minutes 9.33 seconds, 9.63 seconds behind the winning USA team. In the 2016 Rio Olympics he made the semifinal of the 200 Individual Medley where he lined up with Michael Phelps and Ryan Lochte. He ended up finishing tenth overall.

In August 2012, Lloyd "photobombed" British Prime Minister David Cameron at the end of the London 2012 Olympics parade.
