= The Woodlands Swim Team =

Swimming club in Texas, United States

- Founded: 1973
- League: USA Swimming
- Based in: The Woodlands, TX
- Arena: CISD Laura Wilkinson Natatorium, Conroe Independent School District
- Colors: Green & Black
- Head coach: Jarrod Murphy; Heather Jorris (Head Age Group)
- Championships: 2008 Texas Age Group Long Course Championship
- Website: www.itwst.org

The Woodlands Swim Team (TWST) is a swim club based out of The Woodlands, Texas. The team has sent twenty-five swimmers to the Olympic trials, holds numerous TAGS (Texas Age Group Swimming) records, and has won 39 of 50 TAGS state championships since 1973. TWST is led by Head Coach Jarrod Murphy. TWST is a member of USA Swimming. TWST swimmers competing at a national level include: Michael McBroom Kelsey Amundsen and Gray Umbach.

== History ==
The team started in 1975, training at The Woodlands Athletic Club (WAC), but has since moved to the CISD Natatorium in nearby Shenandoah, TX.
