= Aimee Willmott =

British swimmer

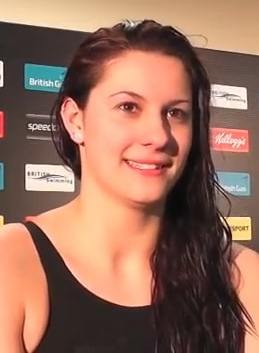
- Willmott in 2012

Personal information
- National team: Great Britain
- Born: 26 February 1993 (age 33) Middlesbrough, England
- Height: 1.71 m (5 ft 7 in)
- Weight: 67.5 kg (149 lb)
- Website: www.willmottswimskills.co.uk/about-aimee

Sport
- Sport: Swimming
- Club: University of Stirling
Medal record
Women's swimming
Representing Great Britain
European Championships (LC)
Silver medal – second place	2014 Berlin	200 m medley
Silver medal – second place	2020 Budapest	400 m medley
Bronze medal – third place	2014 Berlin	400 m medley
European Championships (SC)
Bronze medal – third place	2012 Chartres	800 m freestyle
Bronze medal – third place	2013 Herning	400 m medley
Representing England
Commonwealth Games
Gold medal – first place	2018 Gold Coast	400 m medley
Silver medal – second place	2014 Glasgow	400 m medley
Silver medal – second place	2014 Glasgow	200 m butterfly

Aimee Willmott (born 26 February 1993) is an English competitive swimmer who has represented Great Britain at three Olympic Games', FINA world championships and European championships, and England in the Commonwealth Games. She was the 2018 Commonwealth Games champion in the 400 metres individual medley.

== Life ==
Willmott competed at the 2012 and 2016 Summer Olympics in the 400 metre individual medley reaching the final in 2016. She competed in the 2010 Commonwealth Games in Delhi, 2014 games in Glasgow where she won silver medals in the 400 metre individual medley and 200 metres butterfly and the 2018 Games in Gold Coast, Australia where she won a gold medal in the 400 metre individual medley. Aimee currently trains at the University of Stirling. She also runs a business called Willmottswimskills where she imparts her knowledge of swimming to other swimmers across the country.

Willmott has a younger sister Chloe (born 1 October 1994) who was a competitive swimmer. Their father, Stuart Willmott is a former Olympic swimmer. She attended Nunthorpe Academy Teesside University and is a graduate from the University of East London.

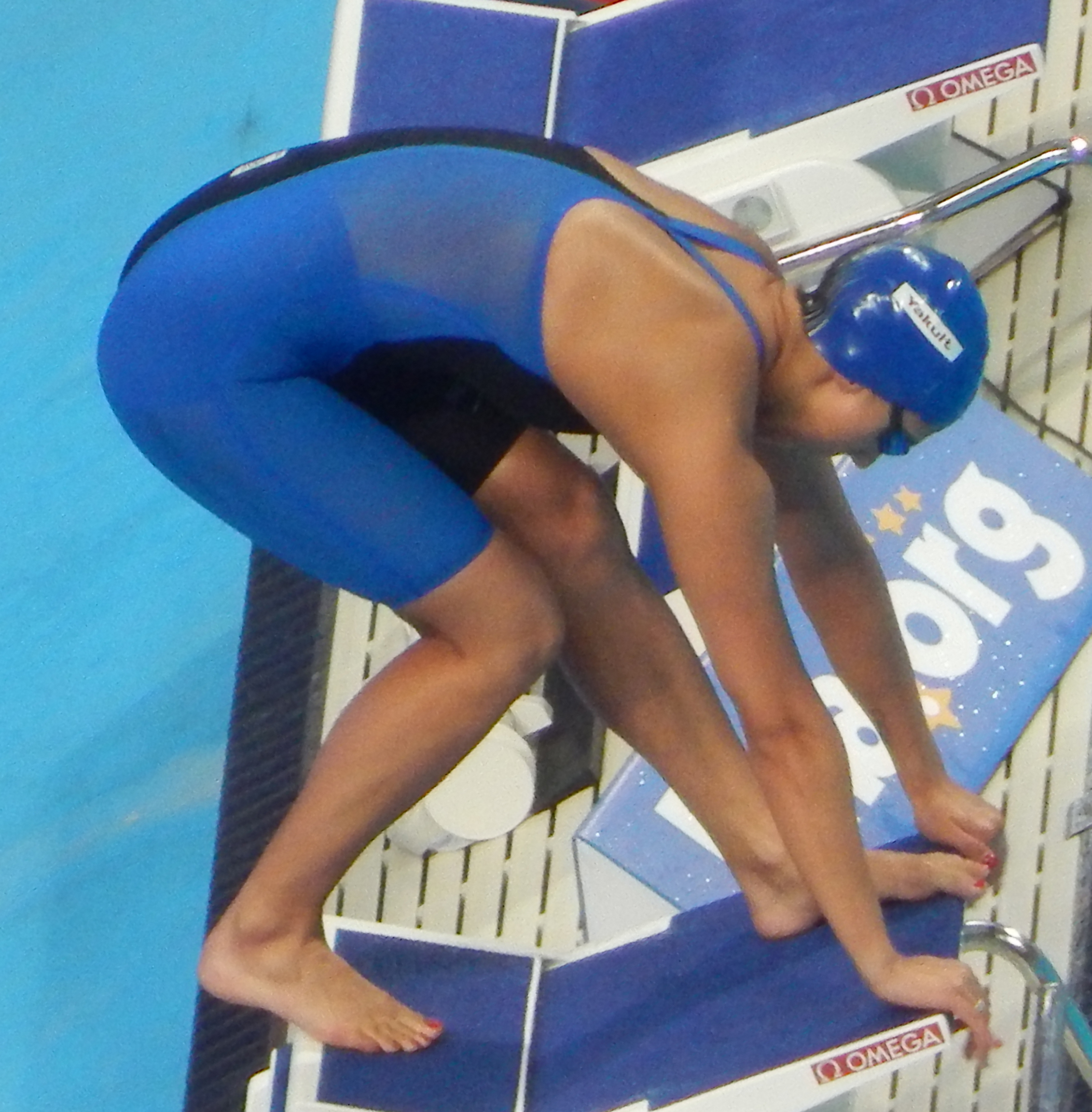
Willmott during the 2015 World Aquatics Championships

In April 2016, she was selected to represent GB in the 2016 Olympics after finishing second behind Hannah Miley in the 400m individual medley at the British Championships.

Willmott and her father Stuart went into business together in 2019 called Willmott Swim Skills. with the motto “Learn Lots, Swim Fast”.

Willmott is a member of the London Roar team, competing in Season 2 of the International Swimming League (ISL). The ISL is an annual professional swimming league featuring a team-based competition format with fast paced race sessions. 10 teams featuring the world’s best swimmers will compete for the ISL title in 2020.

Willmott was named as a member of the "high quality" British team to go to the postponed 2020 Olympics in April 2021. This would be another Olympics where she would be joined by inexperienced Olympians like Freya Anderson and Anna Hopkin.

On the 26 March, Willmott will attend an "Inspire Talk" at All Saints Academy, Ingleby Barwick where she will give an inspirational speech to the students.

== See also ==
- List of Commonwealth Games medallists in swimming (women)
