= Ward Bauwens =

Belgian swimmer (born 1993)

Personal information
- Nationality: Belgium
- Born: 4 May 1993 (age 33) Leuven, Belgium
- Height: 1.80 m (5 ft 11 in)
- Weight: 73 kg (161 lb)

Sport
- Sport: Swimming
- Strokes: Individual medley
- Club: Brabo Antwerp

Ward Bauwens (born 4 May 1993 in Leuven) is a Belgian swimmer, who specialized in individual medley events. Bauwens is a resident athlete for Brabo Antwerp, and currently, a medicine student at the University of Antwerp.

Before his Olympic debut, Bauwens broke his own 400 IM record several times. On 16 March 2012 he posted a time of 4:19.55 to blast a 16-year-old record (4:19.82), held by Stefaan Maene since 1995, at the Belgian Championships in Antwerp.

Bauwens qualified for the men's 400 m individual medley, by clearing a 4:19 barrier, and eclipsing a FINA B-cut of 4:18.24 from the European Championships in Debrecen, Hungary. He surged past Luxembourg's Raphaël Stacchiotti with a freestyle kick to top the second heat by 0.49 of a second, breaking his own Belgian record of 4:16.71. Bauwens failed to advance into the final, as he placed sixteenth overall on the first day of the preliminaries.
