= Felice Maniero =

Italian crime boss

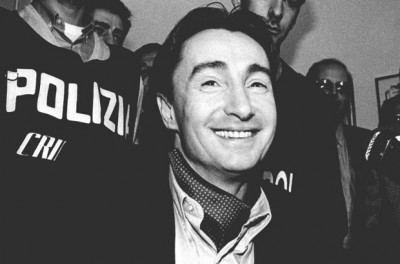
- Maniero during his 1990 arrest
- Born: Felice Maniero; 2 September 1954 (age 72); Campolongo Maggiore, Italy
- Other name: Faccia d'Angelo
- Spouse: Agostina Rigato (divorced)
- Children: 2
- Allegiance: Mala del Brenta
- Convictions: Mafia association, robbery, drug trafficking, kidnapping and murder
- Penalty: 33 years' imprisonment and ordered to pay 200 million lire in restitution (reduced to 17 years following cooperation)

Felice Maniero (born 2 September 1954) is a former Italian crime boss who was the head of the Mala del Brenta, a criminal organization based in the region of Veneto throughout the 1970s and 1990s. His nickname is Faccia d'Angelo ("Angel Face").

== Early life ==
Maniero was born in Campolongo Maggiore. At the age of three, his family moved to Turin where his father worked as a test driver at Fiat. In 1964 they returned to Campolongo Maggiore, where they bought a restaurant, which soon became a meeting point for the local mafia.

Maniero's criminal career began in his adolescence, when he helped his paternal uncle, Renato, with cattle thefts. He later conducted robberies of jewelry stores. Maniero gained accomplices and eventually transformed his gang into a full-fledged mafia organization. His gang robbed up to two billion lire from the Venice Casino and the Marco Polo Airport where 170 kg of gold was being shipped.

== Arrests and escapes ==
Maniero was first arrested in 1980, and escaped from prison twice. The first escape was in 1987 from the prison of Fossombrone. On 10 October 1991, he had his men steal the chin of Saint Anthony statue from the Basilica of Saint Anthony of Padua to blackmail the State to demand for the freedom of his cousin, without success. In August 1993, he was arrested on his yacht off the coast of Capri and was detained in the prison of Vicenza where he attempted to escape by unsuccessfully bribing two prison guards. He was transferred to the prison of Padua where, on 14 June 1994, he escaped together with other accomplices after bribing a prison guard.

== Prison and pentito ==
Maniero was captured in Turin in November 1994, and sentenced to 33 years of imprisonment and ordered to pay 200 million lire in restitution for mafia association, robbery, drug trafficking, kidnapping and murder.

In February 1995, Maniero turned state's evidence and his sentence was reduced to 11 years for mafia association, involving robberies, drug trafficking, and kidnappings, and 14 years for seven murders, of which he admitted to five, totalling 17 years when combined. He was put in witness protection with his family in a villa in Spoltore. In December 1996, he was sentenced by the Court of Assizes of Appeal of Venice to 11 years in prison and a 60 million Italian lire fine thanks to the mitigating circumstances and the reduction for collaboration. On 2 May 1998 he was arrested to serve the remaining sentence, four years. After becoming a collaborator of justice, he was admitted to the protection program, changing his name and serving his sentence in a secret location.

On 23 August 2010, Maniero was released from custody.

== Life after Mala del Brenta ==
Maniero founded a company with his son called Anyaquae, but the business went bankrupt in 2016. Maniero then launched a business related to microplastic mitigation.

Maniero has one child with ex-wife Agostina Rigato, Elena Maniero, who committed suicide in February 2006 at the age of 29. Maniero has one child with the sister of Marta Bisello, Alessandro Bisello Maniero.

In October 2019, Maniero was arrested by the police on charges of mistreatment of his girlfriend, the sister of the mother of his son. On 5 October 2021, he was definitively sentenced by the Court of Cassation to four years in prison for mistreatment; he was released from the Pescara prison in June 2023.
