= Ophélie-Cyrielle Étienne =

French swimmer (born 1990)

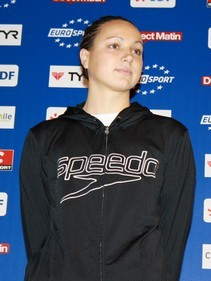
- 2011

Personal information
- Nationality: France
- Born: 9 September 1990 (age 36) Wissembourg, France
- Height: 176 cm (5 ft 9 in)
- Weight: 62 kg (137 lb)

Sport
- Sport: Swimming
- Strokes: Freestyle
Medal record
Women's swimming
Representing France
Olympic Games
Bronze medal – third place	2012 London	4×200 m freestyle
World Championships (SC)
Bronze medal – third place	2010 Dubai	4×200 m freestyle
European Championships (LC)
Silver medal – second place	2010 Budapest	400 m freestyle
Silver medal – second place	2010 Budapest	800 m freestyle
Silver medal – second place	2010 Budapest	4×200 m freestyle
Bronze medal – third place	2012 Debrecen	200 m freestyle
Bronze medal – third place	2012 Debrecen	400 m freestyle
European Championships (SC)
Bronze medal – third place	2009 Istanbul	400 m freestyle
Bronze medal – third place	2009 Istanbul	800 m freestyle
Mediterranean Games
Silver medal – second place	2009 Pescara	200 m freestyle
Bronze medal – third place	2009 Pescara	800 m freestyle
World Junior Championships
Gold medal – first place	2006 Rio de Janeiro	200 m freestyle
Gold medal – first place	2006 Rio de Janeiro	4×100 m freestyle
Gold medal – first place	2006 Rio de Janeiro	4×200 m freestyle

Ophélie-Cyrielle Étienne (born 9 September 1990) is a French swimmer from Wissembourg. In the 2012 Summer Olympics her 4 × 200 m freestyle team won a bronze medal in a time of 7:47.49. The split times were: Camille Muffat (1:55.51); Charlotte Bonnet (1:57.78); Étienne (1:58.05); Coralie Balmy (1:56.15).

She also competed in 200 m freestyle, 4 × 200 m freestyle relay and the 4 × 100 m freestyle relay at the 2008 Summer Olympics, and the 200 m freestyle at the 2012 Summer Olympics.
