= Alexandre Liess =

Swiss swimmer (born 1991)

Personal information
- Nickname: Gex
- Nationality: Switzerland
- Born: 20 June 1991 (age 35) Geneva, Switzerland
- Height: 1.81 m (5 ft 11 1/2 in)
- Weight: 75 kg (165 lb)

Sport
- Sport: Swimming
- Strokes: Freestyle, butterfly
- Club: SSG Saar Max Ritter
- Coach: Gennadi Touretski

Alexandre Liess (born June 20, 1991) is a Swiss swimmer, who specialized in freestyle and butterfly events. He is a 10-time Swiss swimming champion, and currently holds age group national records in the 200 m butterfly. Liess is a member of SSG Saar Max Ritter in Germany, under his Russian-born coach Gennadi Touretski, who is best known for training multiple Olympic medalists Alexander Popov and Michael Klim in the late 1990s.

Liess qualified for the men's 200 m butterfly at the 2012 Summer Olympics in London, by breaking a Swiss record and eclipsing the FINA B-cut off time of 1:58.13 at the European Championships in Debrecen, Hungary. He challenged seven other swimmers in the second heat, including former semifinalist Hsu Chi-chieh of the Chinese Taipei. Liess was in last place by 0.16 of a second behind Canada's David Sharpe. Liess failed to advance into the semifinals, as he placed thirty-third overall in the preliminaries.
