= Patricia Castro =

Spanish freestyle and relay swimmer

Personal information
- Full name: Patricia Castro Ortega
- Nationality: Spain
- Born: 6 August 1992 (age 34) Madrid, Spain
- Height: 1.78 m (5 ft 10 in)
- Weight: 66 kg (146 lb)

Sport
- Sport: Swimming
- Strokes: Freestyle
- Club: Club Natació Terrassa (ESP)
Medal record
European Championships (LC)
Silver medal – second place	2016 London	4×200 m freestyle

Patricia Castro Ortega (born 6 August 1992) is a Spanish freestyle and relay swimmer, who was selected to the national team to qualify for the 2012 Summer Olympics in London. She competed in the women's 4 × 200 m freestyle relay, along with her teammates Mireia Belmonte García, Melania Costa, and Lydia Morant. She and her team placed tenth in the heats, with a time of 7:54.59, breaking their national swimming record, but failing to advance into the finals.

Castro is a student at Queens University of Charlotte, and formerly a member of Club Natació Terrassa
