= Beatriz Gómez Cortés =

Spanish swimmer

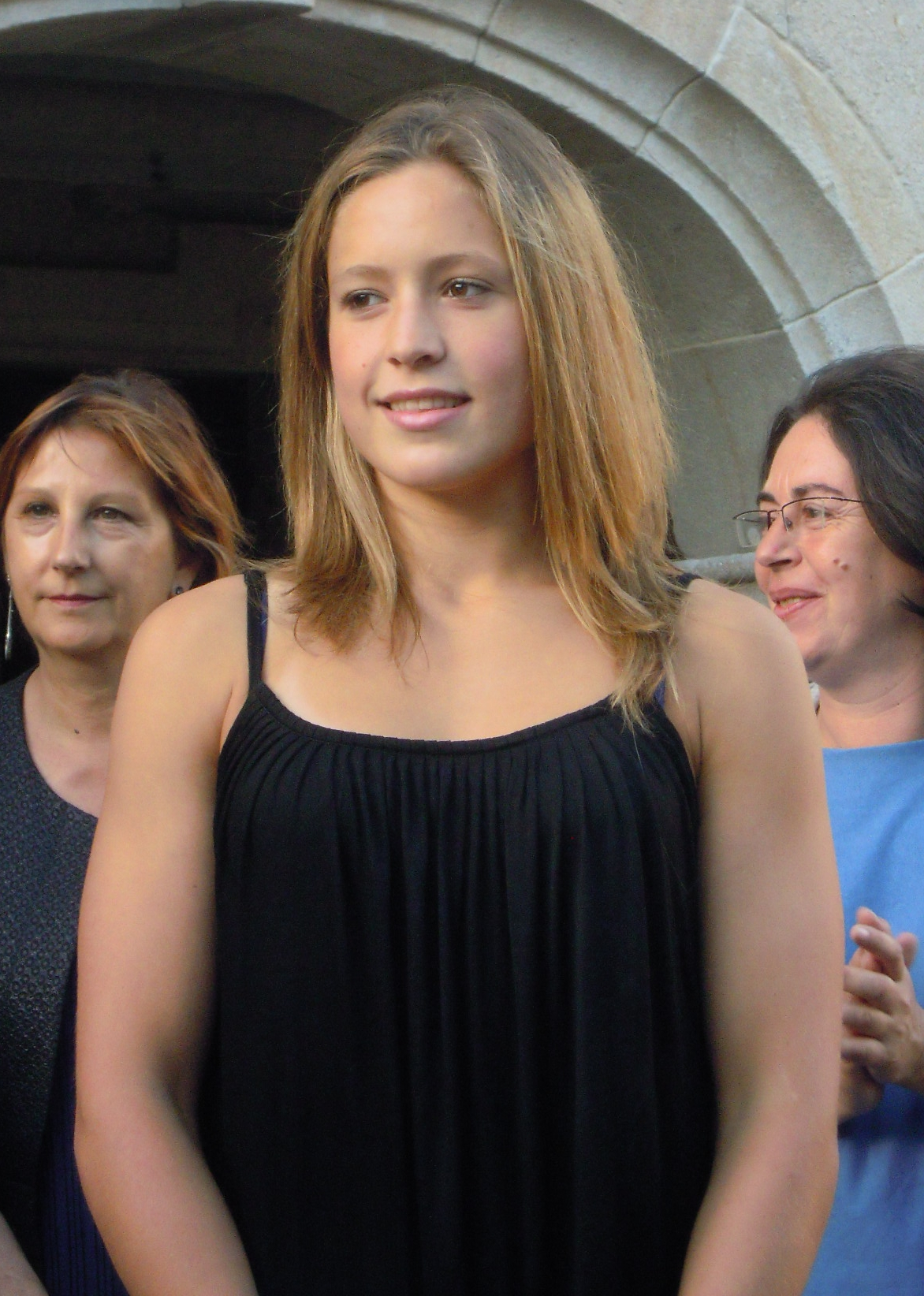
- Gómez in 2012

Personal information
- Born: 29 December 1994 (age 31) Pontevedra, Spain

Sport
- Sport: Swimming
- Strokes: Medley
Medal record
Representing Spain
World Junior Championships
Gold medal – first place	2011 Lima	200m individual medley
European Junior Championships
Silver medal – second place	2010 Helsinki	200m individual medley
Silver medal – second place	2010 Helsinki	400m individual medley

Beatriz Gómez Cortés (born 29 December 1994) is a Spanish Olympic swimmer. She swam at the 2012 Summer Olympics in the 200 m individual medley. Gómez won a gold medal in the 200m IM at the 2011 FINA World Junior Swimming Championships and won silver medals at the 2010 European Junior Swimming Championships in the 200m IM and 400m IM.
