= Silke Lippok =

German swimmer

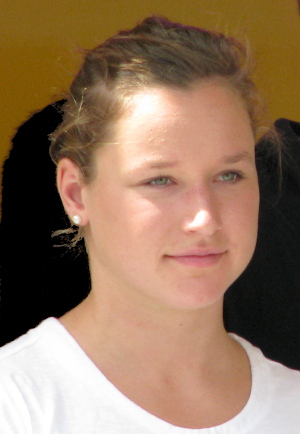

Personal information
- Full name: Silke Lippok
- Nationality: Germany
- Born: 31 January 1994 (age 32) Pforzheim, Germany
- Height: 1.71 m (5 ft 7 in)
- Weight: 68 kg (150 lb)

Sport
- Sport: Swimming
- Strokes: Freestyle
Medal record
World Championships (LC)
Bronze medal – third place	2011 Shanghai	4×100 m freestyle
European Championships (LC)
Gold medal – first place	2010 Budapest	4×100 m freestyle
Gold medal – first place	2012 Debrecen	4×100 m freestyle
Silver medal – second place	2010 Budapest	200 m freestyle
Silver medal – second place	2012 Debrecen	200 m freestyle
Bronze medal – third place	2010 Budapest	4×100 m medley
European Championships (SC)
Gold medal – first place	2011 Szczecin	200 m freestyle
Silver medal – second place	2010 Eindhoven	200 m freestyle
Youth World Championships
Silver medal – second place	2008 Monterrey	100 m freestyle
Silver medal – second place	2008 Monterrey	4×100 m freestyle
European Junior Championships
Gold medal – first place	2009 Prague	50 m freestyle
Gold medal – first place	2009 Prague	100 m freestyle
Gold medal – first place	2009 Prague	4×100 m freestyle
Gold medal – first place	2009 Prague	4×100 m medley
Gold medal – first place	2010 Helsinki	100 m freestyle
Gold medal – first place	2010 Helsinki	200 m freestyle
Gold medal – first place	2010 Helsinki	4×100 m freestyle
Gold medal – first place	2010 Helsinki	4×200 m freestyle
Gold medal – first place	2010 Helsinki	4×100 m medley
Silver medal – second place	2009 Prague	200 m freestyle
Silver medal – second place	2009 Prague	4×200 m freestyle
Silver medal – second place	2010 Helsinki	50 m freestyle
Silver medal – second place	2010 Helsinki	50 m butterfly

Silke Lippok (born 31 January 1994) is a German swimmer. She competed at the 2012 Summer Olympics in the 200 m, 4 × 100 m and 4 × 200 m freestyle events and finished in 13th, 9th and 11th place, respectively. She won three European titles in these events in 2010–2012.

She is the daughter of Christine and Andreas Lippok; her father works in a taxi business. She started training in swimming at the age of five following her elder brother Nils.
