= Coralie Balmy =

French freestyle swimmer (born 1987)

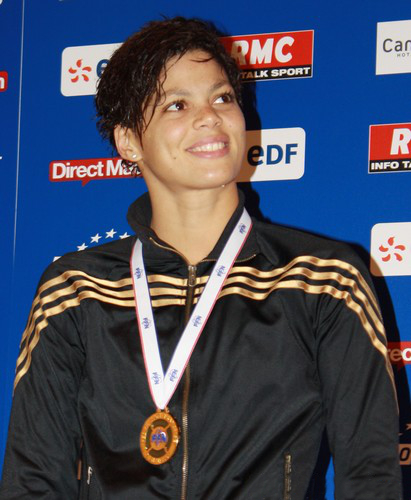

Personal information
- National team: France
- Born: 8 June 1987 (age 39) La Trinité, Martinique
- Height: 1.80 m (5 ft 11 in)
- Weight: 67 kg (148 lb)

Sport
- Sport: Swimming
Medal record
Women's swimming
Representing France
Olympic Games
Bronze medal – third place	2012 London	4×200 m freestyle
World Championships (LC)
Bronze medal – third place	2013 Barcelona	4 × 200 m freestyle
World Championships (SC)
Bronze medal – third place	2010 Dubai	4 × 200 m freestyle
European Championships (LC)
Gold medal – first place	2008 Eindhoven	4×200 m freestyle
Gold medal – first place	2012 Debrecen	400 m freestyle
Silver medal – second place	2008 Eindhoven	400 m freestyle
Silver medal – second place	2010 Budapest	4×200 m freestyle
Silver medal – second place	2012 Debrecen	800 m freestyle
Bronze medal – third place	2014 Berlin	4 × 100 m mixed freestyle
European Championships (SC)
Gold medal – first place	2008 Rijeka	400 m freestyle
Gold medal – first place	2009 Istanbul	400 m freestyle
Silver medal – second place	2008 Rijeka	800 m freestyle
Bronze medal – third place	2007 Debrecen	200 m freestyle
Bronze medal – third place	2012 Chartres	400 m freestyle

Coralie Balmy (born 8 June 1987) is a French freestyle swimmer. Balmy was born in La Trinité, Martinique. She won her first senior title at the 2008 European Aquatics Championships in Eindhoven in the 4 × 200 m relay freestyle. At the same Championships she won the silver medal in the 400 m freestyle with the time of 4:04.15, all-time fourth fastest behind Federica Pellegrini's world record. At the 2008 Summer Olympics in Beijing, she finished fourth in the 400 m freestyle final. On 6 December 2008 she set the world record for the 200 m freestyle (short course) at the French National Championships in Angers, France in a time of 1:53.16. At the 2012 Summer Olympics her 4 × 200 m freestyle team won the bronze medal in a time of 7:47.49. The split times: Camille Muffat (1:55.51); Charlotte Bonnet (1:57.78); Ophélie-Cyrielle Étienne (1:58.05); Coralie Balmy (1:56.15).

- Achievements
- 2007: SC European Championships
  - 3rd 200 m freestyle (1:54.43)
- 2008: LC European Championships
  - 1st 4×200 m freestyle (7:52.09)
  - 2nd 400 m freestyle (4:04.15)

== See also ==
- World record progression 200 metres freestyle

Records
Preceded by Libby Lenton	Women's 200 metre freestyle world record holder (short course); 6 December 2008 – 14 December 2008	Succeeded by Federica Pellegrini
