= Evelyn Verrasztó =

Hungarian professional swimmer

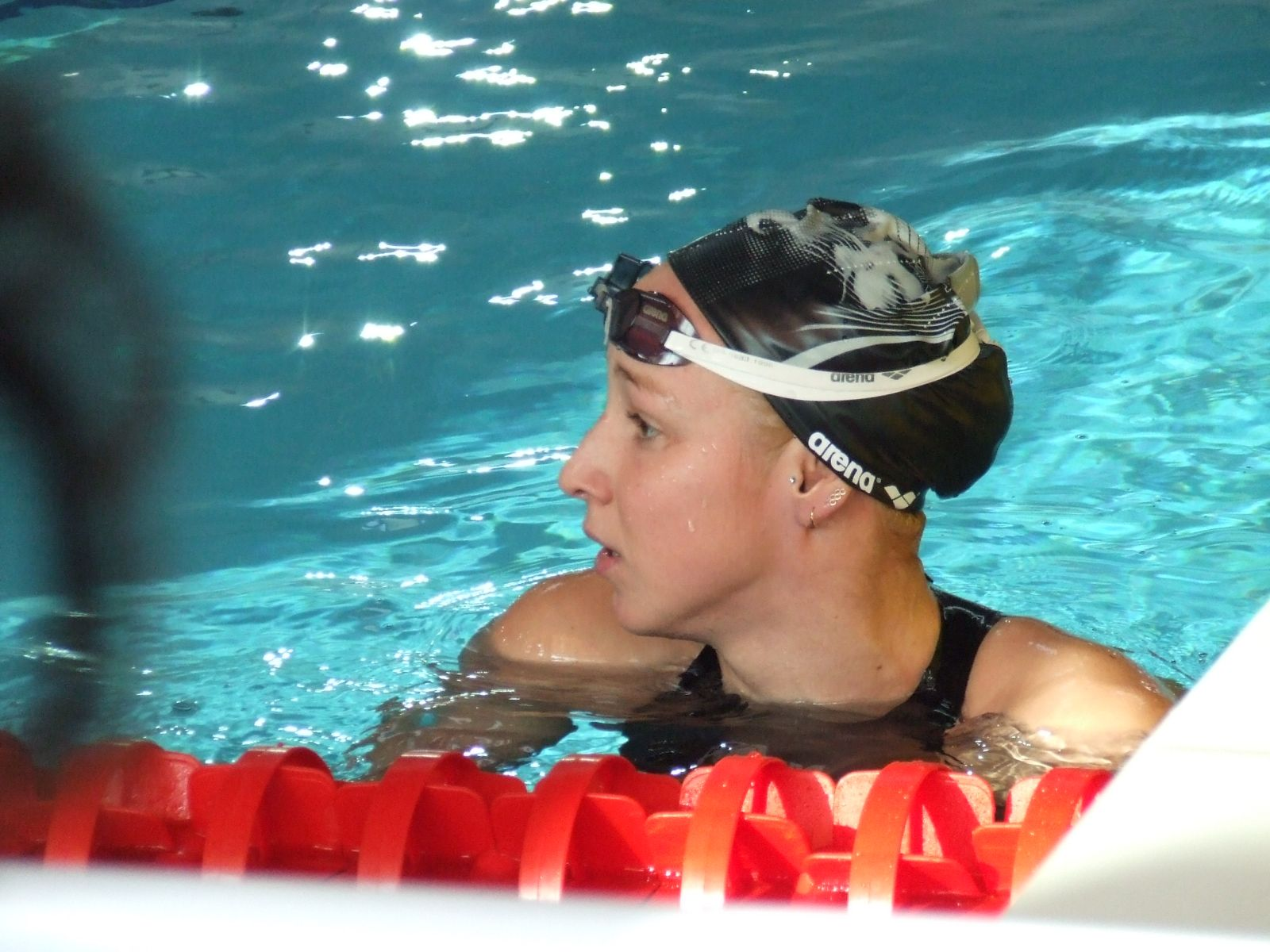
- Verrasztó in 2008

Personal information
- Full name: Verrasztó Evelyn
- Nationality: Hungarian
- Born: 17 July 1989 (age 36) Budapest, Hungary
- Height: 1.73 m (5 ft 8 in)
- Weight: 57 kg (126 lb)

Sport
- Sport: Swimming
- Strokes: Backstroke and medley
- Club: Jövő SC
Medal record
Representing Hungary
Women's swimming
European Championships (LC)
| Gold medal – first place | 2010 Budapest | 4×200 m freestyle |
| Gold medal – first place | 2016 London | 4×200 m freestyle |
| Silver medal – second place | 2008 Eindhoven | 200 m medley |
| Silver medal – second place | 2010 Budapest | 200 m medley |
| Silver medal – second place | 2012 Debrecen | 4×200 m freestyle |
| Silver medal – second place | 2020 Budapest | 4×200 m freestyle |
| Bronze medal – third place | 2012 Debrecen | 200 m medley |
| Bronze medal – third place | 2014 Berlin | 4x200 m freestyle |
| Bronze medal – third place | 2016 London | 4×100 m mixed medley |
European Championships (SC)
| Gold medal – first place | 2009 Istanbul | 200 m medley |
| Gold medal – first place | 2010 Eindhoven | 100 m medley |
| Gold medal – first place | 2010 Eindhoven | 200 m medley |
| Silver medal – second place | 2008 Rijeka | 100 m medley |
| Silver medal – second place | 2008 Rijeka | 200 m medley |
| Silver medal – second place | 2009 Istanbul | 100 m medley |
| Silver medal – second place | 2009 Istanbul | 200 m freestyle |
| Silver medal – second place | 2011 Szczecin | 200 m medley |
| Silver medal – second place | 2017 Copenhagen | 200 m medley |
| Bronze medal – third place | 2007 Debrecen | 200 m medley |
| Bronze medal – third place | 2010 Eindhoven | 200 m freestyle |
| Bronze medal – third place | 2011 Szczecin | 200 m freestyle |
Women's lifesaving
World Games
| Gold medal – first place | 2022 Birmingham | 4x50 m obstacle |

Evelyn Verrasztó (born 17 July 1989) is a Hungarian swimmer, who competed for her native country at the Summer Olympics in 2004, 2008, 2012 and 2016.

Her father and coach, Zoltán Verrasztó, and her brother, Dávid Verrasztó are also Olympic swimmers.

== Early life ==
Evelyn was born in 1989, one year after her brother, Dávid Verrasztó in Budapest. Their father, an Olympic swimmer himself, coached them to become world-class swimmers., one year after her brother, Dávid Verrasztó in Budapest. Their father, an Olympic swimmer himself, coached them to become world-class swimmers.

== See also ==
- List of European Aquatics Championships medalists in swimming (women)
- List of European Short Course Swimming Championships medalists (women)

== Awards ==
- Cross of Merit of the Republic of Hungary – Bronze Cross (2008)
- Hungarian swimmer of the Year (1): 2008
