= Lydia Morant =

Spanish swimmer

Lidia Morant
Personal information
- Full name: Lidia Morant Varó
- Nationality: Spanish
- Born: 22 November 1990 (age 35) Gandia, Spain

Sport
- Sport: Swimming

Lidia Morant Varó (Note: In this Spanish name, the first or paternal surname is Morant and the second or maternal family name is Varó.) (born 22 November 1990 in Gandia), known as Lidia Morant or Lydia Morant, is a Spanish swimmer who competed in the 2008 Summer Olympics, in the 200 m backstroke, and the 2012 Summer Olympics, in the 4 x 200 m freestyle.
