= Nina Rangelova =

Bulgarian swimmer

Personal information
- National team: Bulgaria
- Born: 22 October 1990 (age 35) Plovdiv, Bulgaria
- Height: 1.70 m (5 ft 7 in) (2012)
- Weight: 58 kg (128 lb) (2012)
- Spouse: Mindaugas Sadauskas (m. 2018)

Sport
- Sport: Swimming
- Strokes: Freestyle
- Coach: Steve Collins

Nina Rangelova (born 22 October 1990) is a Bulgarian swimmer.

At the 2008 Summer Olympics, she competed in the women's 200 m freestyle, but did not progress beyond the heats.

She competed at the 2012 Summer Olympics in the Women's 400 metre freestyle, finishing 23rd in the heats, failing to qualify for the final, but breaking the Bulgarian national record. She also set new records in the 100 m and 200 m freestyle, but again did not progress beyond the heats.

At the FINA World Championships in Kazan, Russia, Rangelova qualified for her third Olympic Games in the 200 m Freestyle event with a time of 1:58:40, also setting a new Bulgarian record. At the 2016 Summer Olympics, she competed in the 100 m and 200 m freestyle, but again did not progress beyond the heats.

== Personal life ==
In 2018 Rangelova married Lithuanian Olympic swimmer Mindaugas Sadauskas.
