= Sycerika McMahon =

Irish swimmer

Sycerika McMahon OLY
Personal information
- National team: Ireland
- Born: April 11, 1995 (age 31) County Down, Northern Ireland, United Kingdom
- Height: 1.7 m (5 ft 7 in)
- Weight: 60 kg (132 lb)

Sport
- Sport: Swimming
- Strokes: Breaststroke; Freestyle
Medal record
Women's swimming
Representing Ireland
European Championships (LC)
Silver medal – second place	2012 Debrecen	50 m breaststroke
European Championships (SC)
Bronze medal – third place	2012 Chartres	50 m breaststroke
European Junior Championships
Gold medal – first place	2011 Belgrade	400m freestyle
Gold medal – first place	2011 Belgrade	50m breaststroke
Silver medal – second place	2011 Belgrade	200m freestyle
Bronze medal – third place	2010 Helsinki	400m freestyle
European Youth Olympic Festival
Silver medal – second place	2009 Tampere	400m freestyle
Bronze medal – third place	2009 Tampere	200m medley
Bronze medal – third place	2009 Tampere	400m medley

Sycerika McMahon (born 11 April 1995) is a retired Irish swimmer from Portaferry, County Down.

McMahon won a bronze medal in the 400m freestyle at the 2010 European Junior Swimming Championships in Helsinki with a time of 4:15.92, an Irish junior record. In the 2011 Championships in Belgrade she won gold in the 400m freestyle with a time of 4:13.85 (more than 2 seconds faster than her time the previous year), another gold in the 50m breaststroke with a time of 32.00 (0.2 seconds faster the previous year's winner Lisa Fissneider), and a silver medal in the 200m freestyle with a time of 2:00.61, 0.11 seconds behind Russian Ksenia Yuskova.

At 17 she became the youngest Irish medal-winner in a major event when she took silver in the 50 metre breaststroke at the 2012 European Aquatics Championships in Debrecen, where she also set a new Irish record. She competed for Ireland at the 2012 Summer Olympics, finishing 26th overall in the 100 metre breaststroke and 22nd overall in the 200 metre individual medley, where she came third in her heat. In the 2012 European Short Course Swimming Championships in Chartres she won bronze in the 50 m breaststroke behind Petra Chocová and Rikke Møller Pedersen. In 2013 McMahon took up a scholarship to study at Texas A&M University. In her Freshman year she became the second-fastest A&M Aggie ever in the 100 yard breaststroke when she finished fourth in the event at the SEC Championships with a time of 59.35 seconds.

McMahon announced her retirement from the sport on Instagram in June 2017, aged 22.
