= Ágnes Mutina =

Hungarian swimmer (born 1988)

Personal information
- Full name: Mutina Ágnes
- Nationality: Hungary
- Born: 19 April 1988 (age 38) Miskolc, Borsod-Abaúj-Zemplén
- Height: 1.70 m (5 ft 7 in)
- Weight: 61 kg (134 lb)

Sport
- Sport: Swimming
- Strokes: Freestyle
- Club: Eger Városi Úszó Klub; A Jövő SC
Medal record
European Championships (LC)
Gold medal – first place	2010 Budapest	4×200 m freestyle
Silver medal – second place	2012 Debrecen	4×200 m freestyle
Bronze medal – third place	2008 Eindhoven	200 m freestyle
Bronze medal – third place	2010 Budapest	200 m freestyle
European Championships (SC)
Gold medal – first place	2010 Eindhoven	400 m freestyle
Bronze medal – third place	2007 Debrecen	400 m freestyle

Ágnes Mutina (born 19 April 1988 in Miskolc, Borsod-Abaúj-Zemplén) is a female Hungarian swimmer, who competed three times for her native country at the Summer Olympics; in 2004, 2008 and 2012.

In 2010 at the European Championships held in her home country she came fourth in the 4×100 m freestyle and became European champion as part of the 4×200 m freestyle relay team.
