= Swimming at the 2014 European Aquatics Championships – Women's 800 metre freestyle =

Women's 800 Metre Freestyle at the Swimming at the 2014 European Aquatics Championships
- Dates: 20–21 August
- Competitors: 23 from 11 nations
- Winning time: 8:15.54

Medalists
gold medal	Jazmin Carlin	Great Britain
silver medal	Mireia Belmonte	Spain
bronze medal	Boglárka Kapás	Hungary

The women's 800 metre freestyle competition of the 2014 European Aquatics Championships was held on 20–21 August.

== Records ==
Prior to the competition, the existing world, European and championship records were as follows.

	Name	Nation	Time	Location	Date
World record	Katie Ledecky	United States	8:11.00	Shenandoah	22 June 2014
European record	Rebecca Adlington	United Kingdom	8:14.10	Beijing	16 August 2008
Championship record	Laure Manaudou	France	8:19.29	Budapest	2 August 2006

== Results ==
=== Heats ===
The heats were held at 10:40.

Rank	Heat	Lane	Name	Nationality	Time	Notes
1	2	4	Jazmin Carlin	Great Britain	8:22.70	Q
2	2	5	Mireia Belmonte	Spain	8:25.22	Q
3	3	5	Boglárka Kapás	Hungary	8:28.87	Q
4	2	3	Sharon van Rouwendaal	Netherlands	8:31.02	Q
5	2	6	Sarah Köhler	Germany	8:31.03	Q
6	3	4	Lotte Friis	Denmark	8:31.04	Q
7	2	7	Tjasa Oder	Slovenia	8:31.14	Q
8	3	7	Martina Caramignoli	Italy	8:32.58	Q
9	3	3	Aurore Ponsele	Italy	8:33.07	
10	3	1	Diletta Carli	Italy	8:34.96	
11	3	0	Spela Perse	Slovenia	8:37.73	
12	3	8	Gaja Natlacen	Slovenia	8:37.95	
13	2	1	Julia Hassler	Liechtenstein	8:38.33	
14	3	2	María Vilas	Spain	8:41.43	
15	2	2	Leonie Beck	Germany	8:43.54	
16	2	8	Julie Lauridsen	Denmark	8:45.78	
17	3	6	Beatriz Gómez Cortés	Spain	8:46.11	
18	2	9	Martina Elhenická	Czech Republic	8:58.10	
19	1	5	Barbora Picková	Czech Republic	9:05.85	
20	2	0	Maj Howardsen	Denmark	9:07.73	
21	3	9	Andrea Basaraba	Serbia	9:10.14	
22	1	3	Alena Benešová	Czech Republic	9:10.77	
23	1	4	Anna-Marie Benešová	Czech Republic	9:32.03	

=== Final ===
The final was held at 18:07.

Rank	Lane	Name	Nationality	Time	Notes
1st place, gold medalist(s)	4	Jazmin Carlin	Great Britain	8:15.54	CR
2nd place, silver medalist(s)	5	Mireia Belmonte	Spain	8:21.22	
3rd place, bronze medalist(s)	3	Boglárka Kapás	Hungary	8:22.06	
4	7	Lotte Friis	Denmark	8:27.21	
5	6	Sharon van Rouwendaal	Netherlands	8:28.28	
6	8	Martina Caramignoli	Italy	8:30.47	
7	2	Sarah Köhler	Germany	8:30.94	
8	1	Tjasa Oder	Slovenia	8:31.09	
