= Swimming at the 2015 World Aquatics Championships – Women's 400 metre freestyle =

Women's 400 metre freestyle at the 2015 World Aquatics Championships
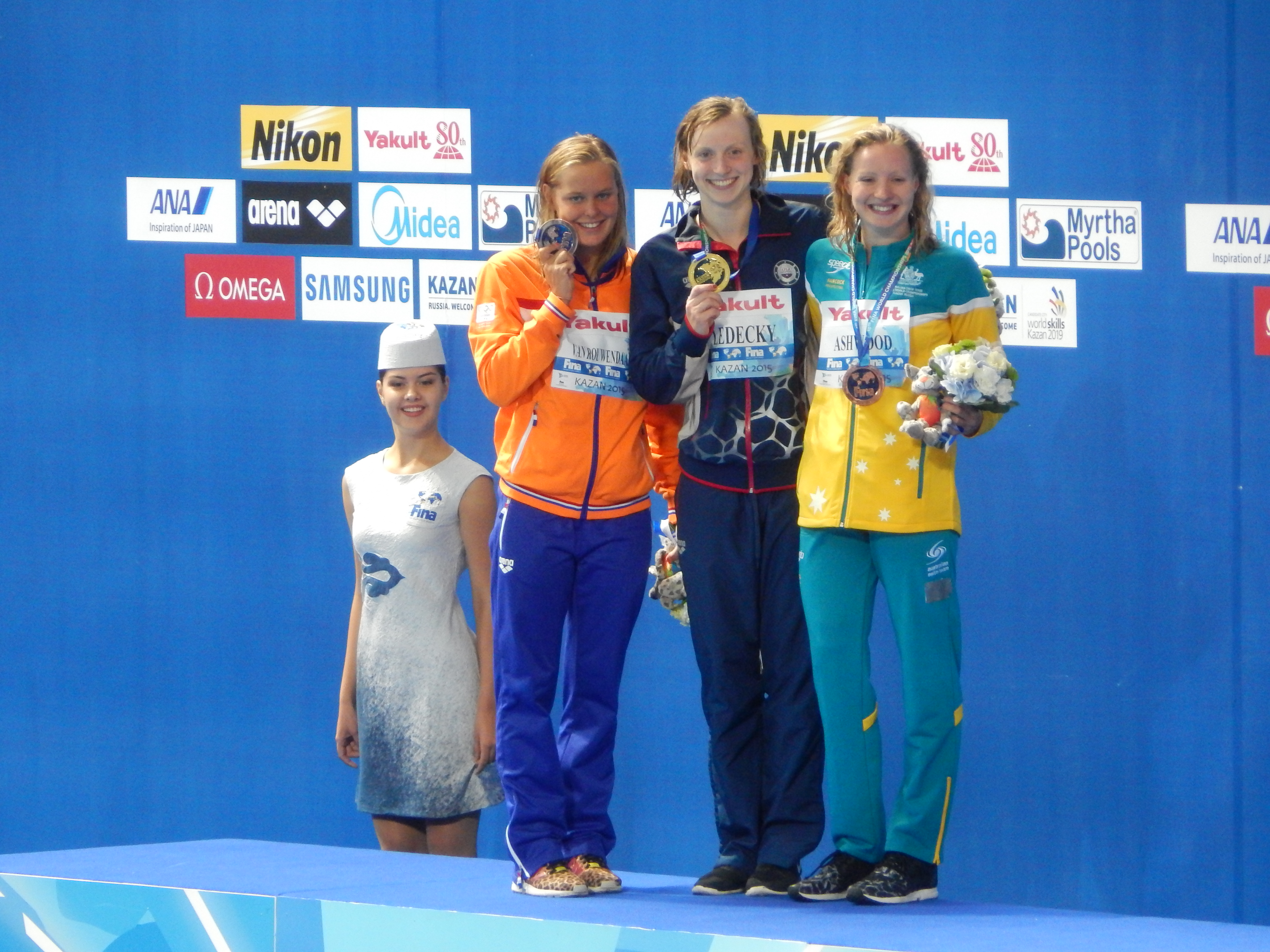
- Victory Ceremony
- Dates: 2 August (heats and final)
- Competitors: 49 from 43 nations
- Winning time: 3:59.13

Medalists
gold medal	Katie Ledecky	United States
silver medal	Sharon van Rouwendaal	Netherlands
bronze medal	Jessica Ashwood	Australia

The Women's 400 metre freestyle competition of the swimming events at the 2015 World Aquatics Championships was held on 2 August with the heats and the final.

== Records ==
Prior to the competition, the existing world and championship records were as follows.

World record	Katie Ledecky (USA)	3:58.37	Gold Coast, Australia	23 August 2014
Competition record	Federica Pellegrini (ITA)	3:59.15	Rome, Italy	26 July 2009

The following new records were set during this competition.

Date	Event	Name	Nationality	Time	Record
2 August	Final	Katie Ledecky	United States	3:59.13	CR

== Results ==
=== Heats ===
The heats were held at 11:03.

Rank	Heat	Lane	Name	Nationality	Time	Notes
1	5	4	Katie Ledecky	United States	4:01.73	Q
2	5	6	Jessica Ashwood	Australia	4:04.47	Q
3	5	5	Sharon van Rouwendaal	Netherlands	4:05.02	Q
4	4	5	Lauren Boyle	New Zealand	4:05.53	Q
5	5	7	Boglárka Kapás	Hungary	4:06.21	Q
6	4	4	Jazmin Carlin	Great Britain	4:07.15	Q
6	4	6	Diletta Carli	Italy	4:07.15	Q
8	5	1	Melania Costa	Spain	4:07.58	Q
9	5	3	Cierra Runge	United States	4:07.97	
10	4	9	Anja Klinar	Slovenia	4:08.57	
11	5	8	Shao Yiwen	China	4:08.93	
12	4	1	Sarah Köhler	Germany	4:09.21	
13	5	2	Cao Yue	China	4:09.60	
14	4	3	Coralie Balmy	France	4:09.68	
15	4	8	Andreina Pinto	Venezuela	4:09.75	
16	3	5	Manuella Lyrio	Brazil	4:10.57	NR
17	4	2	Alice Mizzau	Italy	4:10.92	
18	3	4	Arina Openysheva	Russia	4:11.71	
19	5	9	Johanna Friedrich	Germany	4:12.09	
20	4	0	Chihiro Igarashi	Japan	4:13.43	
21	4	7	Leah Neale	Australia	4:13.98	
22	5	0	Emily Overholt	Canada	4:14.45	
23	3	7	Julia Hassler	Liechtenstein	4:14.51	
24	2	1	María Álvarez	Colombia	4:14.60	NR
25	3	8	Monique Olivier	Luxembourg	4:15.24	
26	3	2	Jo Hyun-ju	South Korea	4:15.39	
27	2	6	Martina van Berkel	Switzerland	4:15.83	
28	3	3	Emma Robinson	New Zealand	4:16.43	
29	3	1	Claudia Hufnagl	Austria	4:17.14	
30	2	7	Martina Elhenická	Czech Republic	4:18.57	
31	2	2	Khoo Cai Lin	Malaysia	4:18.75	
32	2	4	Andrea Cedrón	Peru	4:18.96	
33	2	3	Rachel Tseng	Singapore	4:19.97	
34	3	6	Samantha Arévalo	Ecuador	4:20.47	
35	2	0	Katarina Simonović	Serbia	4:20.94	
36	2	5	Elisbet Gámez	Cuba	4:21.36	
37	2	8	Merve Eroğlu	Turkey	4:24.77	
38	1	5	Daniella van den Berg	Aruba	4:24.79	
39	3	0	Gabriela Santis	Guatemala	4:25.92	
40	1	2	Helena Moreno	Costa Rica	4:26.87	
41	1	4	Lani Cabrera	Barbados	4:28.31	
42	1	3	Elena Giovannini	San Marino	4:29.40	
43	1	6	Sara Pastrana	Honduras	4:32.58	
44	2	9	Talita Te Flan	Ivory Coast	4:32.72	
45	1	7	Gabriella Doueihy	Lebanon	4:35.09	
46	3	9	Benjaporn Sriphanomthorn	Thailand	4:36.55	
47	1	1	Arianna Sanna	Dominican Republic	4:39.87	
48	1	0	Victoria Chentsova	Northern Mariana Islands	4:44.15	
49	1	8	Makaela Holowchak	Antigua and Barbuda	4:47.77	

=== Final ===
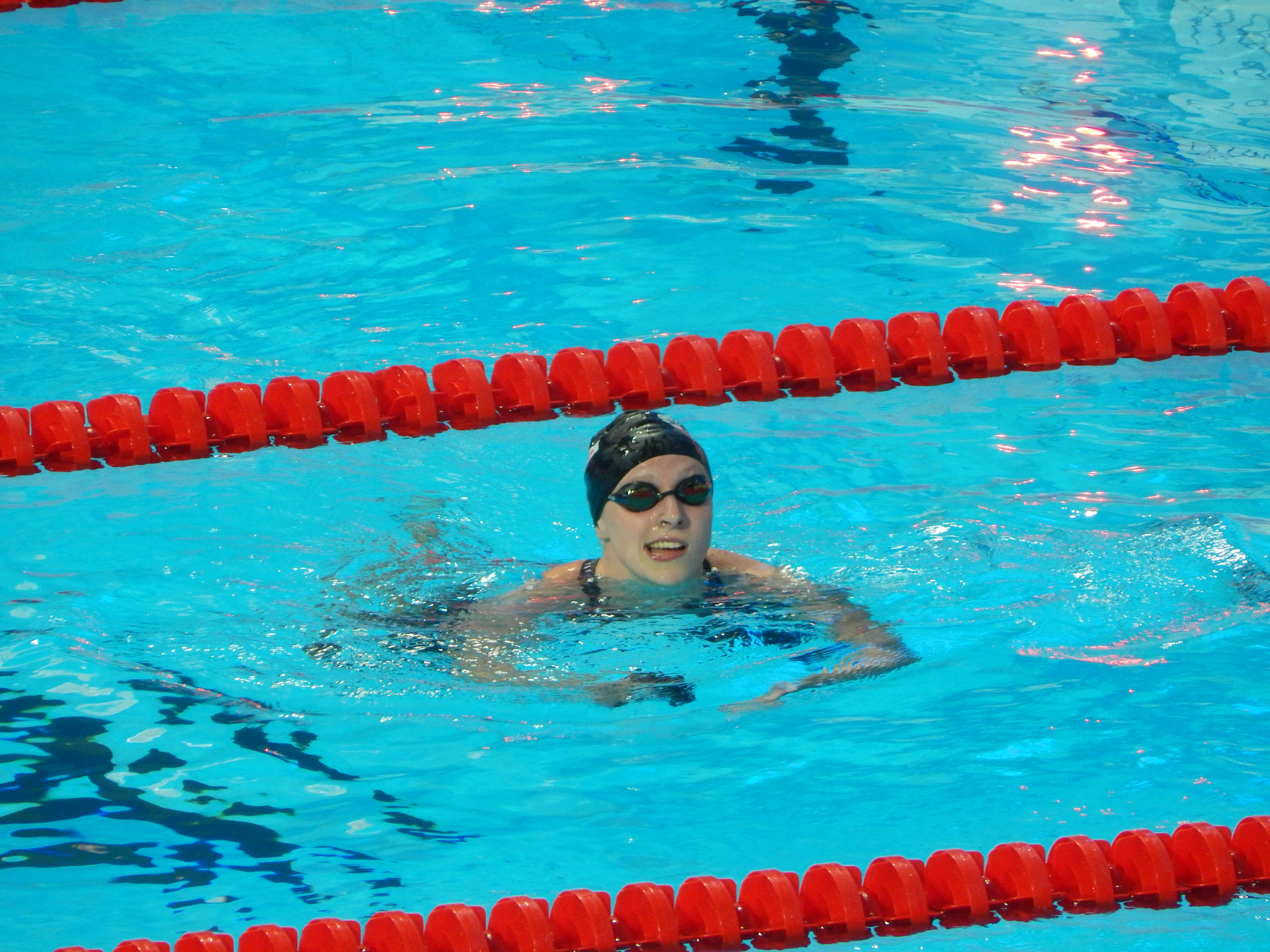
Katie Ledecky after the final heat

The final was held at 18:23.

Rank	Lane	Name	Nationality	Time	Notes
1st place, gold medalist(s)	4	Katie Ledecky	United States	3:59.13	CR
2nd place, silver medalist(s)	3	Sharon van Rouwendaal	Netherlands	4:03.02	NR
3rd place, bronze medalist(s)	5	Jessica Ashwood	Australia	4:03.34	OC
4	7	Jazmin Carlin	Great Britain	4:03.74	
5	6	Lauren Boyle	New Zealand	4:04.38	
6	8	Melania Costa	Spain	4:06.50	
7	1	Diletta Carli	Italy	4:07.30	
8	2	Boglárka Kapás	Hungary	4:08.22	
