= Swimming at the 2014 European Aquatics Championships – Women's 400 metre freestyle =

Women's 400 metre freestyle at the Swimming at the 2014 European Aquatics Championships
- Dates: 24 August
- Competitors: 25 from 16 nations
- Winning time: 4:03.24

Medalists
gold medal	Jazmin Carlin	Great Britain
silver medal	Sharon van Rouwendaal	Netherlands
bronze medal	Mireia Belmonte	Spain

The Women's 400 metre freestyle competition of the 2014 European Aquatics Championships was held on 24 August.

== Records ==
Prior to the competition, the existing world, European and championship records were as follows.

	Name	Nation	Time	Location	Date
World record	Katie Ledecky	United States	3:58.86	Irvine	9 August 2014
European record	Federica Pellegrini	Italy	3:59.15	Rome	26 July 2009
Championship record	Federica Pellegrini	Italy	4:01.53	Eindhoven	24 March 2008

== Results ==
=== Heats ===
The heats were held at 09:30.

Rank	Heat	Lane	Name	Nationality	Time	Notes
1	2	5	Federica Pellegrini	Italy	4:07.09	Q
2	2	4	Mireia Belmonte	Spain	4:07.12	Q
3	3	7	Sharon van Rouwendaal	Netherlands	4:07.59	Q
4	3	5	Jazmin Carlin	Great Britain	4:08.17	Q
5	3	6	Boglárka Kapás	Hungary	4:09.17	Q
6	3	4	Melani Costa	Spain	4:09.59	Q
7	3	3	Lotte Friis	Denmark	4:09.75	Q
8	3	1	Diletta Carli	Italy	4:09.84	Q
9	2	1	Sarah Köhler	Germany	4:10.37	
10	2	6	Coralie Balmy	France	4:10.48	
11	3	2	Aurora Ponselè	Italy	4:11.21	
12	1	4	Barbora Závadová	Czech Republic	4:13.18	
13	1	5	Sycerika McMahon	Ireland	4:13.26	
14	2	7	Johanna Friedrich	Germany	4:15.04	
15	3	0	Julie Lauridsen	Denmark	4:15.44	
16	2	0	Julia Hassler	Liechtenstein	4:15.98	
17	3	8	Arina Openysheva	Russia	4:16.19	
18	2	8	Esmee Vermeulen	Netherlands	4:17.04	
19	3	9	Gaja Natlacen	Slovenia	4:17.69	
20	1	6	Katarina Simonović	Croatia	4:20.09	
21	1	1	Alyona Kyselyova	Ukraine	4:21.01	
22	2	9	Maj Howardsen	Denmark	4:21.09	
23	1	2	Lisa Stamm	Switzerland	4:23.40	
24	1	7	Alena Benešová	Czech Republic	4:28.56	
25	1	3	Anna-Marie Benešová	Czech Republic	4:29.11	
—	2	2	Alice Mizzau	Italy		DNS
—	2	3	Katinka Hosszú	Hungary		DNS

=== Final ===
The final was held at 16:47.

Rank	Lane	Name	Nationality	Time	Notes
1st place, gold medalist(s)	6	Jazmin Carlin	Great Britain	4:03.24	
2nd place, silver medalist(s)	3	Sharon van Rouwendaal	Netherlands	4:03.76	
3rd place, bronze medalist(s)	5	Mireia Belmonte	Spain	4:04.01	
4	4	Federica Pellegrini	Italy	4:04.42	
5	2	Boglárka Kapás	Hungary	4:06.61	
6	7	Melani Costa	Spain	4:07.42	
7	1	Lotte Friis	Denmark	4:10.13	
8	8	Diletta Carli	Italy	4:12.56	
