= Swimming at the 2016 European Aquatics Championships – Women's 400 metre freestyle =

Women's 400 metre freestyle at the 2016 European Aquatics Championships
- Dates: 22 May
- Competitors: 40 from 20 nations
- Winning time: 4:03.47

Medalists
gold medal	Boglárka Kapás	Hungary
silver medal	Jazmin Carlin	Great Britain
bronze medal	Mireia Belmonte	Spain

The Women's 400 metre freestyle competition of the 2016 European Aquatics Championships was held on 22 May 2016.

== Records ==
Prior to the competition, the existing world, European and championship records were as follows.

	Name	Nation	Time	Location	Date
World record	Katie Ledecky	United States	3:58.37	Gold Coast	23 August 2014
European record	Federica Pellegrini	Italy	3:59.15	Rome	26 July 2009
Championship record	Federica Pellegrini	Italy	4:01.53	Eindhoven	24 March 2008

== Results ==
=== Heats ===
The heats were held at 09:00.

Rank	Heat	Lane	Name	Nationality	Time	Notes
1	4	2	Martina De Memme	Italy	4:09.36	Q
2	5	5	Mireia Belmonte	Spain	4:09.60	Q
3	5	3	Boglárka Kapás	Hungary	4:09.80	Q
4	5	6	Melani Costa	Spain	4:10.00	Q
5	4	5	Diletta Carli	Italy	4:10.25	Q
6	4	4	Jazmin Carlin	Great Britain	4:10.78	Q
7	5	4	Sharon van Rouwendaal	Netherlands	4:12.08	Q
8	5	1	Camilla Hattersley	Great Britain	4:12.26	Q
9	5	7	Hannah Miley	Great Britain	4:13.09	
10	4	6	Ajna Késely	Hungary	4:13.13	
11	3	4	María Vilas	Spain	4:13.62	
12	5	9	Antonia Massone	Germany	4:13.64	
13	3	3	Paula Żukowska	Poland	4:14.46	
14	4	3	Alice Mizzau	Italy	4:14.79	
15	4	9	Julia Hassler	Liechtenstein	4:14.96	
16	4	7	Ellie Faulkner	Great Britain	4:15.14	
17	5	8	Tjasa Oder	Slovenia	4:15.83	
18	4	1	Fantine Lesaffre	France	4:16.39	
19	4	0	Diana Duraes	Portugal	4:16.45	
20	3	7	Henriette Stenkvist	Sweden	4:16.75	
21	2	6	Tereza Závadová	Czech Republic	4:16.80	
22	5	0	Gaja Natlačen	Slovenia	4:16.88	
23	3	5	Andrea Kneppers	Netherlands	4:16.94	
24	2	5	Valentine Dumont	Belgium	4:17.11	
25	2	7	Nika Petrič	Slovenia	4:18.01	
26	3	9	Barbora Závadová	Czech Republic	4:18.57	
27	2	1	Marte Løvberg	Norway	4:19.28	
28	4	8	Esmee Vermeulen	Netherlands	4:19.80	
29	3	1	Milena Karpisz	Poland	4:20.15	
30	1	4	Jaqueline Hippi	Sweden	4:21.29	
31	3	2	Monika Czerniak	Poland	4:22.29	
32	2	3	Martina Elhenická	Czech Republic	4:22.89	
33	3	8	Paulina Piechota	Poland	4:23.41	
34	2	2	Aino Otava	Finland	4:24.11	
35	2	8	Anniina Ala-Seppälä	Finland	4:26.98	
36	1	3	Sara Lettoli	San Marino	4:27.20	
37	2	9	Elena Giovannini	San Marino	4:27.75	
38	3	0	Claudia Hufnagl	Austria	4:27.83	
39	1	5	Nejla Karić	Bosnia and Herzegovina	4:28.62	
40	2	0	Sara Nysted	Faroe Islands	4:32.65	
	2	4	Laura Lajunen	Finland	DNS	
	3	6	Sycerika McMahon	Ireland	DNS	
	5	2	Anja Klinar	Slovenia	DNS	

=== Final ===
The final was held at 16:57.

Rank	Lane	Name	Nationality	Time	Notes
1st place, gold medalist(s)	3	Boglárka Kapás	Hungary	4:03.47	
2nd place, silver medalist(s)	7	Jazmin Carlin	Great Britain	4:04.85	
3rd place, bronze medalist(s)	5	Mireia Belmonte	Spain	4:06.89	
4	4	Martina De Memme	Italy	4:08.19	
5	6	Melani Costa	Spain	4:09.10	
6	1	Sharon van Rouwendaal	Netherlands	4:09.50	
7	2	Diletta Carli	Italy	4:09.51	
7	8	Camilla Hattersley	Great Britain	4:09.51	
