= Swimming at the 2016 European Aquatics Championships – Women's 1500 metre freestyle =

Women's 1500 metre freestyle at the 2016 European Aquatics Championships
- Dates: 20–21 May
- Competitors: 15 from 10 nations
- Winning time: 15:50.22

Medalists
| gold medal | Boglárka Kapás | Hungary |
| silver medal | Mireia Belmonte | Spain |
| bronze medal | María Vilas | Spain |

The Women's 1500 metre freestyle competition of the 2016 European Aquatics Championships was held on 20 and 21 May 2016.

== Records ==
Prior to the competition, the existing world, European and championship records were as follows.

| | Name | Nation | Time | Location | Date |
|---|---|---|---|---|---|
| World record | Katie Ledecky | United States | 15:25.48 | Kazan | 4 August 2015 |
| European record | Lotte Friis | Denmark | 15:38.88 | Barcelona | 30 July 2013 |
| Championship record | Mireia Belmonte | Spain | 15:57.29 | Berlin | 23 August 2014 |

== Results ==
=== Heats ===
The heats were held on 20 May at 11:29.

| Rank | Heat | Lane | Name | Nationality | Time | Notes |
|---|---|---|---|---|---|---|
| 1 | 2 | 4 | Boglárka Kapás | Hungary | 16:14.43 | Q |
| 2 | 1 | 5 | Mireia Belmonte | Spain | 16:14.74 | Q |
| 3 | 2 | 3 | María Vilas | Spain | 16:15.50 | Q |
| 4 | 2 | 2 | Tjasa Oder | Slovenia | 16:19.95 | Q |
| 5 | 2 | 5 | Simona Quadarella | Italy | 16:26.45 | Q |
| 6 | 1 | 3 | Adél Juhász | Hungary | 16:28.05 | Q |
| 7 | 1 | 2 | Julia Hassler | Liechtenstein | 16:30.82 | Q |
| 8 | 2 | 6 | Gaja Natlačen | Slovenia | 16:31.56 | Q |
| 9 | 2 | 0 | Fantine Lesaffre | France | 16:38.84 | |
| 10 | 1 | 1 | Milena Karpisz | Poland | 16:51.68 | |
| 11 | 2 | 1 | Tereza Závadová | Czech Republic | 16:51.71 | |
| 12 | 2 | 8 | Alice Dearing | Great Britain | 16:52.84 | |
| 13 | 1 | 7 | Paulina Piechota | Poland | 16:59.79 | |
| 14 | 2 | 7 | Martina Elhenická | Czech Republic | 17:08.01 | |
| 15 | 1 | 8 | Nejla Karić | Bosnia and Herzegovina | 17:43.58 | |
| | 1 | 4 | Sharon van Rouwendaal | Netherlands | DNS | |
| | 1 | 6 | Diletta Carli | Italy | DNS | |

=== Final ===
The final was held on 21 May at 16:02.

| Rank | Lane | Name | Nationality | Time | Notes |
|---|---|---|---|---|---|
| 1st place, gold medalist(s) | 4 | Boglárka Kapás | Hungary | 15:50.22 | CR |
| 2nd place, silver medalist(s) | 5 | Mireia Belmonte | Spain | 16:00.20 | |
| 3rd place, bronze medalist(s) | 3 | María Vilas | Spain | 16:01.25 | |
| 4 | 6 | Tjasa Oder | Slovenia | 16:08.67 | |
| 5 | 2 | Simona Quadarella | Italy | 16:22.64 | |
| 6 | 7 | Adél Juhász | Hungary | 16:22.69 | |
| 7 | 1 | Julia Hassler | Liechtenstein | 16:25.83 | |
| 8 | 8 | Gaja Natlačen | Slovenia | 16:26.08 | |
