= Swimming at the 2016 European Aquatics Championships – Women's 800 metre freestyle =

Women's 800 metre freestyle at the 2016 European Aquatics Championships
- Dates: 18–19 May
- Competitors: 25 from 13 nations
- Winning time: 8:21.40

Medalists
gold medal	Boglárka Kapás	Hungary
silver medal	Jazmin Carlin	Great Britain
bronze medal	Tjasa Oder	Slovenia

The Women's 800 metre freestyle competition of the 2016 European Aquatics Championships was held on 18 and 19 May 2016.

== Records ==
Prior to the competition, the existing world, European and championship records were as follows.

	Name	Nation	Time	Location	Date
World record	Katie Ledecky	United States	8:06.68	Austin	17 January 2016
European record	Rebecca Adlington	Great Britain	8:14.10	Beijing	16 August 2008
Championship record	Jazmin Carlin	Great Britain	8:15.54	Berlin	21 August 2014

== Results ==
=== Heats ===
The heats were held on 18 May at 11:13.

Rank	Heat	Lane	Name	Nationality	Time	Notes
1	2	4	Boglárka Kapás	Hungary	8:27.75	Q
2	3	4	Jazmin Carlin	Great Britain	8:29.53	Q
3	3	3	Diletta Carli	Italy	8:30.41	Q
4	3	6	Tjaša Oder	Slovenia	8:31.02	Q
5	2	2	Jimena Pérez	Spain	8:31.19	Q
6	2	3	María Vilas	Spain	8:33.75	Q
7	3	5	Sharon van Rouwendaal	Netherlands	8:36.49	Q
8	2	5	Simona Quadarella	Italy	8:37.25	Q
9	2	7	Ajna Késely	Hungary	8:38.02	
10	3	2	Adél Juhász	Hungary	8:38.45	
11	3	7	Anja Klinar	Slovenia	8:39.72	
12	2	6	Éva Risztov	Hungary	8:39.81	
13	3	8	Gaja Natlačen	Slovenia	8:40.78	
14	2	8	Špela Bohinc	Slovenia	8:42.19	
15	3	1	Julia Hassler	Liechtenstein	8:42.69	
16	2	1	Milena Karpisz	Poland	8:46.33	
17	1	3	Abbie Wood	Great Britain	8:47.04	
18	1	5	Antonia Massone	Germany	8:47.05	
19	2	0	Alice Dearing	Great Britain	8:47.39	
20	1	4	Tereza Závadová	Czech Republic	8:49.10	
21	2	9	Martina Elhenická	Czech Republic	8:56.61	
22	3	9	Paulina Piechota	Poland	8:58.51	
23	3	0	Diana Duraes	Portugal	9:01.65	
24	1	6	Laura Lajunen	Finland	9:15.75	
25	1	2	Nejla Karić	Bosnia and Herzegovina	9:18.39	

=== Final ===
The final was held on 19 May at 18:02.

Rank	Lane	Name	Nationality	Time	Notes
1st place, gold medalist(s)	4	Boglárka Kapás	Hungary	8:21.40	
2nd place, silver medalist(s)	5	Jazmin Carlin	Great Britain	8:23.52	
3rd place, bronze medalist(s)	6	Tjasa Oder	Slovenia	8:25.68	
4	7	María Vilas	Spain	8:26.61	
5	8	Simona Quadarella	Italy	8:31.43	
6	2	Jimena Pérez	Spain	8:31.62	
7	3	Diletta Carli	Italy	8:31.78	
8	1	Sharon van Rouwendaal	Netherlands	8:35.76	
