= Swimming at the 2014 European Aquatics Championships – Women's 1500 metre freestyle =

Women's 1500 metre freestyle at the Swimming at the 2014 European Aquatics Championships
- Dates: 22–23 August
- Competitors: 25 from 12 nations
- Winning time: 15:57.29

Medalists
gold medal	Mireia Belmonte	Spain
silver medal	Boglárka Kapás	Hungary
bronze medal	Martina Caramignoli	Italy

The Women's 1500 metre freestyle competition of the 2014 European Aquatics Championships was held on 22–23 August.

== Records ==
Prior to the competition, the existing world, European and championship records were as follows.

	Name	Nation	Time	Location	Date
World record	Katie Ledecky	United States	15:34.23	Shenandoah	19 June 2014
European record	Lotte Friis	Denmark	15:38.88	Barcelona	30 July 2013
Championship record	Flavia Rigamonti	Switzerland	15:58.54	Eindhoven	23 March 2008

== Results ==
=== Heats ===
The heats were held at 10:34.

Rank	Heat	Lane	Name	Nationality	Time	Notes
1	2	4	Mireia Belmonte	Spain	16:11.22	Q
2	3	2	Aurora Ponsele	Italy	16:14.46	Q
3	3	5	Boglárka Kapás	Hungary	16:17.23	Q
4	2	2	Tjasa Oder	Slovenia	16:18.81	Q
5	3	3	Martina Caramignoli	Italy	16:19.68	Q
6	3	7	Julia Hassler	Liechtenstein	16:21.06	Q
7	2	5	María Vilas	Spain	16:22.48	Q
8	3	6	Isabelle Härle	Germany	16:25.05	Q
9	2	8	Sharon van Rouwendaal	Netherlands	16:26.53	
10	2	6	Sarah Köhler	Germany	16:31.84	
11	3	8	Gaja Natlacen	Slovenia	16:37.41	
12	2	3	Leonie Antonia Beck	Germany	16:37.84	
13	3	0	Coralie Codevelle	France	16:39.78	
14	3	1	Marianna Lymperta	Greece	16:41.11	
15	2	1	Kalliopi Araouzou	Greece	16:44.87	
16	2	0	Aurelie Muller	France	16:45.50	
17	2	9	Spele Perse	Slovenia	16:45.67	
18	3	9	Julie Berthier	France	16:57.82	
19	1	5	Martina Elhenická	Czech Republic	17:06.29	
20	2	7	Morgone Rothon	France	17:11.50	
21	1	4	Andrea Basaraba	Serbia	17:20.73	
22	1	3	Maj Howardson	Denmark	17:21.16	
23	1	6	Alena Benešová	Czech Republic	17:28.34	
24	1	2	Barbora Picková	Czech Republic	17:30.36	
25	1	7	Anna-Marie Benešová	Czech Republic	18:15.11	
—	3	4	Lotte Friis	Denmark		DNS

=== Final ===
The final was held at 16:02.

Rank	Lane	Name	Nationality	Time	Notes
1st place, gold medalist(s)	4	Mireia Belmonte	Spain	15:57.29	CR
2nd place, silver medalist(s)	3	Boglárka Kapás	Hungary	16:03.04	
3rd place, bronze medalist(s)	2	Martina Caramignoli	Italy	16:05.98	
4	6	Tjasa Oder	Slovenia	16:11.17	
5	5	Aurora Ponsele	Italy	16:13.20	
6	8	Isabelle Härle	Germany	16:17.55	
7	1	María Vilas	Spain	16:22.48	
8	7	Julia Hassler	Liechtenstein	16:26.37	
