= 2016 FINA World Swimming Championships (25 m) – Women's 400 metre freestyle =

Women's 400 metre freestyle at the 2016 FINA World Swimming Championships (25 m)
- Venue: WFCU Centre
- Dates: 9 December (heats and final)
- Competitors: 54 from 43 nations
- Winning time: 3:57.78

Medalists
gold medal	Leah Smith	United States
silver medal	Veronika Popova	Russia
bronze medal	Chihiro Igarashi	Japan

The Women's 400 metre freestyle competition of the 2016 FINA World Swimming Championships (25 m) was held on 9 December 2016.

== Records ==
Prior to the competition, the existing world and championship records were as follows.

	Name	Nation	Time	Location	Date
World record	Mireia Belmonte	Spain	3:54.52	Berlin	11 August 2013
Championship record	Mireia Belmonte	Spain	3:55.76	Doha	5 December 2014

== Results ==
=== Heats ===
The heats were held at 10:25.

Rank	Heat	Lane	Name	Nationality	Time	Notes
1	5	4	Leah Smith	United States	4:00.47	Q
2	6	5	Veronika Popova	Russia	4:01.11	Q, NR
3	5	2	Chihiro Igarashi	Japan	4:02.23	Q
4	6	4	Katinka Hosszú	Hungary	4:02.38	Q
5	6	6	Ariarne Titmus	Australia	4:03.54	Q
6	6	3	Sharon van Rouwendaal	Netherlands	4:04.07	Q
7	6	8	Zhang Yuhan	China	4:04.49	Q
8	6	9	Aya Takano	Japan	4:04.89	Q
9	5	3	Ashley Twichell	United States	4:05.27	
10	4	7	Kennedy Goss	Canada	4:05.91	
11	5	6	Arina Openysheva	Russia	4:06.31	
12	6	1	Reva Foos	Germany	4:06.47	
13	5	7	Kiah Melverton	Australia	4:06.51	
14	4	2	Taylor Ruck	Canada	4:06.69	
15	5	0	Li Bingjie	China	4:07.03	
16	1	9	Abbie Wood	Great Britain	4:07.29	
17	6	7	Georgia Coates	Great Britain	4:09.16	
18	6	2	Viviane Jungblut	Brazil	4:09.38	
19	4	3	Robin Neumann	Netherlands	4:09.67	
20	5	1	Diana Durães	Portugal	4:10.18	NR
21	4	0	Celine Rieder	Germany	4:10.29	
22	5	9	Martina Elhenická	Czech Republic	4:10.38	
23	4	4	Maria Ugolkova	Switzerland	4:10.60	
24	4	5	Delfina Pignatiello	Argentina	4:10.68	
25	4	6	Julia Hassler	Liechtenstein	4:10.95	
26	4	9	Maj Howardsen	Denmark	4:11.51	
27	4	8	Fantina Lesaffre	France	4:12.91	
28	6	0	Gaja Natlacen	Slovenia	4:13.11	
29	3	0	Helena Moreno	Costa Rica	4:13.55	NR
30	3	3	Monique Olivier	Luxembourg	4:15.28	
31	3	7	Souad Nefissa Cherouati	Algeria	4:15.72	
32	3	5	Elisbet Gámez	Cuba	4:16.69	NR
33	3	8	Nejla Karić	Bosnia and Herzegovina	4:17.03	
34	3	4	Benjaporn Sriphanomthorn	Thailand	4:18.20	NR
35	4	1	Tamila Holub	Portugal	4:18.76	
36	1	5	Karen Torrez	Bolivia	4:20.24	
37	3	2	Andrea Cedrón Rodríguez	Peru	4:20.25	
38	3	6	Jessica Cattaneo	Peru	4:21.92	
39	1	8	Christie Chue	Singapore	4:22.49	
40	2	4	Rosalee Mira Santa Ana	Philippines	4:22.70	NR
41	2	6	Gabriella Doueihy	Lebanon	4:24.54	NR
42	3	9	Daniella van den Berg	Aruba	4:25.18	
43	3	1	Sara Nysted	Faroe Islands	4:25.85	
44	2	3	Malavika Vishwanath	India	4:26.98	
45	2	5	Ines Marin	Chile	4:30.09	
46	2	7	Maeform Borriello	Honduras	4:32.47	
47	2	1	Fatima Alkaramova	Azerbaijan	4:32.51	NR
48	2	9	Alania Suttie	Samoa	4:32.72	NR
49	1	3	Enkhkhuslen Batbayar	Mongolia	4:37.87	NR
50	2	8	Yara Lima	Angola	4:40.69	
51	2	0	McKayla Treasure	Barbados	4:42.12	
52	1	2	Diana Basho	Albania	4:54.63	
53	1	6	Tiana Rabarijaona	Madagascar	4:56.27	
54	1	1	Osisang Chilton	Palau	4:59.21	NR
	1	0	Federica Pellegrini	Italy		DNS
	1	4	Dara Al-Bakry	Jordan		DNS
	1	7	Alesia Neziri	Albania		DNS
	2	2	Talita Te Flan	Ivory Coast		DNS
	5	5	Mireia Belmonte	Spain		DNS
	5	8	Ajna Késely	Hungary		DNS

=== Final ===
The final was held at 19:16.

Rank	Lane	Name	Nationality	Time	Notes
1st place, gold medalist(s)	4	Leah Smith	United States	3:57.78	
2nd place, silver medalist(s)	5	Veronika Popova	Russia	3:58.90	NR
3rd place, bronze medalist(s)	3	Chihiro Igarashi	Japan	3:59.41	NR
4	6	Katinka Hosszú	Hungary	3:59.89	
5	1	Zhang Yuhan	China	4:02.61	
6	2	Ariarne Titmus	Australia	4:02.70	
7	7	Sharon van Rouwendaal	Netherlands	4:03.69	
8	8	Aya Takano	Japan	4:05.95	
