= Swimming at the 2016 Summer Olympics – Women's 800 metre freestyle =

Women's 800 metre freestyle at the Games of the XXXI Olympiad
- Venue: Olympic Aquatics Stadium
- Dates: 11 August 2016 (heats); 12 August 2016 (final)
- Competitors: 30 from 21 nations
- Winning time: 8:04.79 WR

Medalists
1st place, gold medalist(s)		Katie Ledecky	United States
2nd place, silver medalist(s)		Jazmin Carlin	Great Britain
3rd place, bronze medalist(s)		Boglárka Kapás	Hungary

The women's 800 metre freestyle event at the 2016 Summer Olympics took place between 11 and 12 August at the Olympic Aquatics Stadium.

== Summary ==
U.S. swimmer Katie Ledecky set a new world record to defend her Olympic title in this event and to successfully complete a distance freestyle treble at a single edition for the first time, since Debbie Meyer did so in 1968. Dominating the race from the start, Ledecky quickly dropped two seconds under a world-record pace, as she pulled further away from the field to overturn her own existing standard with a gold-medal time in 8:04.79. Separated from the leader by 11.38 seconds, Great Britain's Jazmin Carlin edged out the Hungarian challenger Boglárka Kapás at the final lap for her second silver of the meet in 8:16.17. Meanwhile, Kapás faded down the stretch to earn a bronze in 8:16.37, two tenths of a second short of Carlin's time.

London 2012 runner-up Mireia Belmonte slipped off the podium to fourth in a Spanish record of 8:18.55. Outside the 8:20 club, Australia's Jessica Ashwood (8:20.32) and Ledecky's teammate Leah Smith (8:20.95), bronze medalist in the 400 m freestyle, picked up the fifth and sixth spots respectively, finishing 63-hundredths of a second apart from each other. Denmark's Lotte Friis (8:24.50) and Germany's Sarah Köhler (8:27.75) rounded out the championship field.

Ledecky also overturned the existing Olympic record in 8:12.86 to top the field of twenty-seven swimmers in the prelims, taking 1.24 seconds off the standard set by Great Britain's Rebecca Adlington in a since-banned high-tech bodysuit in Beijing eight years earlier.

== Records ==
Prior to this competition, the existing world and Olympic records were as follows.

World record	Katie Ledecky (USA)	8:06.68	Austin, United States	17 January 2016
Olympic record	Rebecca Adlington (GBR)	8:14.10	Beijing, China	16 August 2008

The following records were broken during the competition:

Date	Event	Name	Nationality	Time	Record
11 August	Heat 4	Katie Ledecky	United States	8:12.86	OR
12 August	Final	Katie Ledecky	United States	8:04.79	WR

== Competition format ==
The competition consisted of two rounds: heats and a final. The swimmers with the best 8 times in the heats advanced to the final. Swim-offs were used as necessary to break ties for advancement to the next round.

== Results ==
=== Heats ===
Rank	Heat	Lane	Name	Nationality	Time	Notes
1	4	4	Katie Ledecky	United States	8:12.86	Q, OR
2	4	6	Boglárka Kapás	Hungary	8:19.43	Q, NR
3	4	5	Jazmin Carlin	Great Britain	8:19.67	Q
4	4	3	Leah Smith	United States	8:21.43	Q
5	3	3	Lotte Friis	Denmark	8:22.54	Q
6	3	5	Jessica Ashwood	Australia	8:22.57	Q
7	4	2	Sarah Köhler	Germany	8:24.65	Q
8	2	4	Mireia Belmonte	Spain	8:25.55	Q
9	3	4	Lauren Boyle	New Zealand	8:25.84	
10	3	6	Brittany MacLean	Canada	8:26.43	
11	4	8	Hou Yawen	China	8:30.59	
12	2	2	Andreina Pinto	Venezuela	8:30.92	
13	4	1	Tjaša Oder	Slovenia	8:33.14	
14	1	5	Éva Risztov	Hungary	8:33.36	
15	2	6	Camilla Hattersley	Great Britain	8:33.65	
16	2	7	Emma Robinson	New Zealand	8:33.73	
17	2	3	Kristel Köbrich	Chile	8:34.34	
18	3	2	Zhang Yuhan	China	8:35.32	
19	3	1	María Vilas	Spain	8:36.43	
20	3	8	Tamsin Cook	Australia	8:36.62	
21	1	2	Julia Hassler	Liechtenstein	8:38.19	
22	1	4	Valerie Gruest	Guatemala	8:39.80	NR
23	2	8	Joanna Evans	Bahamas	8:42.93	
24	1	6	Tamila Holub	Portugal	8:45.36	
25	2	5	Leonie Beck	Germany	8:47.47	
26	1	3	Arina Openysheva	Russia	8:48.89	
27	1	7	Talita Te Flan	Ivory Coast	9:07.21	NR
	3	7	Anja Klinar	Slovenia	DNS	
	2	1	Martina De Memme	Italy	DNS	
	4	7	Sharon van Rouwendaal	Netherlands	DNS	

=== Final ===
Rank	Lane	Name	Nationality	Time	Notes
1st place, gold medalist(s)	4	Katie Ledecky	United States	8:04.79	WR
2nd place, silver medalist(s)	3	Jazmin Carlin	Great Britain	8:16.17	
3rd place, bronze medalist(s)	5	Boglárka Kapás	Hungary	8:16.37	NR
4	8	Mireia Belmonte	Spain	8:18.55	NR
5	7	Jessica Ashwood	Australia	8:20.32	
6	6	Leah Smith	United States	8:20.95	
7	2	Lotte Friis	Denmark	8:24.50	
8	1	Sarah Köhler	Germany	8:27.75	
