= Swimming at the 2016 Summer Olympics – Women's 400 metre freestyle =

Women's 400 metre freestyle at the Games of the XXXI Olympiad
- Venue: Olympic Aquatics Stadium
- Dates: 7 August 2016
- Competitors: 32 from 25 nations
- Winning time: 3:56.46 WR

Medalists
1st place, gold medalist(s)		Katie Ledecky	United States
2nd place, silver medalist(s)		Jazmin Carlin	Great Britain
3rd place, bronze medalist(s)		Leah Smith	United States

The women's 400 metre freestyle event at the 2016 Summer Olympics took place on 7 August, at the Olympic Aquatics Stadium.

== Summary ==
U.S. distance ace Katie Ledecky put together a powerful attack on her existing world record to become the first Olympic champion in the event for the Americans, since Brooke Bennett topped the podium in 2000. Leading from the start, Ledecky quickly dropped two seconds under a world-record pace, as she pulled away further from the field to smash her own record with a gold-medal time in 3:56.46. Trailing the leader by almost five seconds, Great Britain's distance-freestyle swimmer Jazmin Carlin fought off a tight battle against Ledecky's teammate Leah Smith on the final lap for the silver in 4:01.23. Meanwhile, Smith faded down the stretch to pick up a bronze with a 4:01.92.

Boglárka Kapás missed the podium in fourth with a Hungarian record of 4:02.37 from the outside lane, while Canada's Brittany MacLean posted a fifth-place time in 4:04.69. Australian duo Tamsin Cook (4:05.30) and Jessica Ashwood (4:05.68) kept a close race to take the sixth and seventh spots respectively, separated by a 0.4-second margin. France's three-time Olympian Coralie Balmy rounded out the top eight with a 4:06.98.

Earlier in the prelims, Ledecky opened her first individual race of the Games with a new Olympic record of 3:58.71 to immediately lock the top seed for the final, clearing a four-minute barrier at the Games for the first time, and slashing 2.74 seconds off the mark set in London 2012 by reigning champion Camille Muffat of France, who was killed on a helicopter crash in March 2015.

The medals for the competition were presented by Nita Ambani, India, IOC member, and the gifts were presented by Dr. Margo Mountjoy, Bureau Member of the FINA.

== Records ==
Prior to this competition, the existing world and Olympic records were as follows.

World record	Katie Ledecky (USA)	3:58.37	Gold Coast, Australia	23 August 2014
Olympic record	Camille Muffat (FRA)	4:01.45	London, Great Britain	29 July 2012

The following records were established during the competition:

Date	Round	Name	Nation	Time	Record
7 August	Heat 4	Katie Ledecky	United States	3:58.71	OR
7 August	Final	Katie Ledecky	United States	3:56.46	WR

== Competition format ==
The competition consisted of two rounds: heats and a final. The swimmers with the best 8 times in the heats advanced to the final. Swim-offs were used as necessary to break ties for advancement to the next round.

== Results ==
=== Heats ===
The heats began 2:28 pm.

Rank	Heat	Lane	Name	Nationality	Time	Notes
1	4	4	Katie Ledecky	United States	3:58.71	Q, OR
2	3	3	Jazmin Carlin	Great Britain	4:02.83	Q
3	3	4	Leah Smith	United States	4:03.39	Q
4	4	6	Coralie Balmy	France	4:03.40	Q
5	3	6	Brittany MacLean	Canada	4:03.43	Q, NR
6	3	5	Jessica Ashwood	Australia	4:03.58	Q
7	4	3	Boglárka Kapás	Hungary	4:04.11	Q
8	4	1	Tamsin Cook	Australia	4:04.36	Q
9	2	5	Zhang Yuhan	China	4:06.30	
10	2	4	Sarah Köhler	Germany	4:06.55	
11	2	3	Lotte Friis	Denmark	4:07.13	
12	1	4	Chihiro Igarashi	Japan	4:07.52	
13	1	3	Joanna Evans	Bahamas	4:07.60	NR
14	4	2	Lauren Boyle	New Zealand	4:07.90	
15	3	2	Mireia Belmonte García	Spain	4:08.12	
16	2	6	Andreina Pinto	Venezuela	4:08.34	
17	3	8	Melania Costa Schmid	Spain	4:08.96	
18	4	8	Anja Klinar	Slovenia	4:09.07	
19	4	5	Sharon van Rouwendaal	Netherlands	4:11.44	
20	2	8	Arina Openysheva	Russia	4:11.83	
21	2	2	Ajna Késely	Hungary	4:12.40	
22	3	1	Alice Mizzau	Italy	4:14.20	
23	1	6	Katarina Simonović	Serbia	4:15.57	
24	1	2	Kristel Köbrich	Chile	4:16.07	
25	2	7	Emily Overholt	Canada	4:16.24	
26	2	1	Nguyễn Thị Ánh Viên	Vietnam	4:16.32	
27	4	7	Diletta Carli	Italy	4:17.15	
28	3	7	Cao Yue	China	4:19.57	
29	1	5	Valerie Gruest	Guatemala	4:19.58	
30	1	7	Lani Cabrera	Barbados	4:28.95	
31	1	8	Gabriella Doueihy	Lebanon	4:31.21	
32	1	1	Rebeca Quinteros	El Salvador	4:52.11	

=== Final ===
Rank	Lane	Name	Nationality	Time	Notes
1st place, gold medalist(s)	4	Katie Ledecky	United States	3:56.46	WR
2nd place, silver medalist(s)	5	Jazmin Carlin	Great Britain	4:01.23	
3rd place, bronze medalist(s)	3	Leah Smith	United States	4:01.92	
4	1	Boglárka Kapás	Hungary	4:02.37	NR
5	2	Brittany MacLean	Canada	4:04.69	
6	8	Tamsin Cook	Australia	4:05.30	
7	7	Jessica Ashwood	Australia	4:05.68	
8	6	Coralie Balmy	France	4:06.98	
