= Swimming at the 2014 European Aquatics Championships – Women's 400 metre individual medley =

Women's 400 metre individual medley at the Swimming at the 2014 European Aquatics Championships
- Dates: 18 August
- Competitors: 27 from 16 nations
- Winning time: 4:31.03

Medalists
| gold medal | Katinka Hosszú | Hungary |
| silver medal | Mireia Belmonte | Spain |
| bronze medal | Aimee Willmott | Great Britain |

The Women's 400 metre individual medley competition of the 2014 European Aquatics Championships was held on 18 August.

== Records ==
Prior to the competition, the existing world, European and championship records were as follows.

| | Name | Nation | Time | Location | Date |
|---|---|---|---|---|---|
| World record | Ye Shiwen | China | 4:28.43 | London | 28 July 2012 |
| European record | Katinka Hosszú | Hungary | 4:30.31 | Rome | 2 August 2009 |
| Championship record | Hannah Miley | Great Britain | 4:33.09 | Budapest | 9 August 2010 |

== Results ==
=== Heats ===
The heats were held at 10:25.

| Rank | Heat | Lane | Name | Nationality | Time | Notes |
|---|---|---|---|---|---|---|
| 1 | 3 | 4 | Katinka Hosszú | Hungary | 4:31.53 | Q |
| 2 | 2 | 4 | Mireia Belmonte | Spain | 4:36.89 | Q |
| 3 | 3 | 7 | Barbora Závadová | Czech Republic | 4:38.82 | Q |
| 4 | 3 | 5 | Aimee Willmott | Great Britain | 4:39.01 | Q |
| 5 | 3 | 6 | Evelyn Verrasztó | Hungary | 4:41.15 | Q |
| 6 | 2 | 2 | María Vilas | Spain | 4:41.43 | Q |
| 7 | 2 | 5 | Stefania Pirozzi | Italy | 4:41.80 | Q |
| 8 | 2 | 7 | Stina Gardell | Sweden | 4:44.16 | Q |
| 9 | 3 | 1 | Réka György | Hungary | 4:44.23 | |
| 10 | 3 | 2 | Lara Grangeon | France | 4:44.61 | |
| 11 | 3 | 3 | Yana Martynova | Russia | 4:44.75 | |
| 12 | 2 | 1 | Franziska Hentke | Germany | 4:44.87 | |
| 13 | 2 | 6 | Beatriz Gómez Cortés | Spain | 4:45.32 | |
| 14 | 3 | 8 | Fantine Lesaffre | France | 4:46.47 | |
| 15 | 2 | 8 | Wendy van der Zanden | Netherlands | 4:47.59 | |
| 16 | 2 | 3 | Catalina Corró | Spain | 4:48.81 | |
| 17 | 1 | 4 | Alyona Kyselyova | Ukraine | 4:50.16 | |
| 18 | 3 | 9 | Martina van Berkel | Switzerland | 4:51.58 | |
| 19 | 3 | 0 | Julie Lauridsen | Denmark | 4:51.83 | |
| 20 | 1 | 5 | Lisa Stamm | Switzerland | 4:52.47 | |
| 21 | 2 | 0 | Victoria Kaminskaya | Portugal | 4:52.83 | |
| 22 | 2 | 9 | Tanja Kylliaeinen | Finland | 4:55.41 | |
| 23 | 1 | 6 | Gizem Bozkurt | Turkey | 4:56.45 | |
| 24 | 1 | 7 | Alena Benešová | Czech Republic | 5:07.27 | |
| 25 | 1 | 2 | Hilla Kortetjaervi | Finland | 5:13.70 | |
| 26 | 1 | 1 | Anna-Marie Benešová | Czech Republic | 5:29.90 | |
| — | 1 | 3 | Annick van Wetsendorp | Switzerland | | DSQ |

=== Final ===
The final was held at 18:36.

| Rank | Lane | Name | Nationality | Time | Notes |
|---|---|---|---|---|---|
| 1st place, gold medalist(s) | 4 | Katinka Hosszú | Hungary | 4:31.03 | CR |
| 2nd place, silver medalist(s) | 5 | Mireia Belmonte | Spain | 4:33.13 | |
| 3rd place, bronze medalist(s) | 6 | Aimee Willmott | Great Britain | 4:34.69 | |
| 4 | 3 | Barbora Závadová | Czech Republic | 4:37.82 | |
| 5 | 1 | Stefania Pirozzi | Italy | 4:39.51 | |
| 6 | 2 | Evelyn Verrasztó | Hungary | 4:40.61 | |
| 7 | 8 | Stina Gardell | Sweden | 4:41.52 | |
| 8 | 7 | Mariá Vilas | Spain | 4:43.31 | |
