= Slovenia at the 2016 Summer Olympics =

- IOC code: SLO
- NOC: Olympic Committee of Slovenia
- Website: www.olympic.si (in Slovene and English)

in Rio de Janeiro
- Competitors: 63 in 12 sports
- Flag bearer (opening): Vasilij Žbogar
- Flag bearer (closing): Tanja Žakelj
- Medals Ranked 45th: Gold 1 Silver 2 Bronze 1 Total 4

Summer Olympics appearances (overview)
- 1992; 1996; 2000; 2004; 2008; 2012; 2016; 2020; 2024; 2028

Other related appearances
- Austria (1912); Yugoslavia (1920–1988)

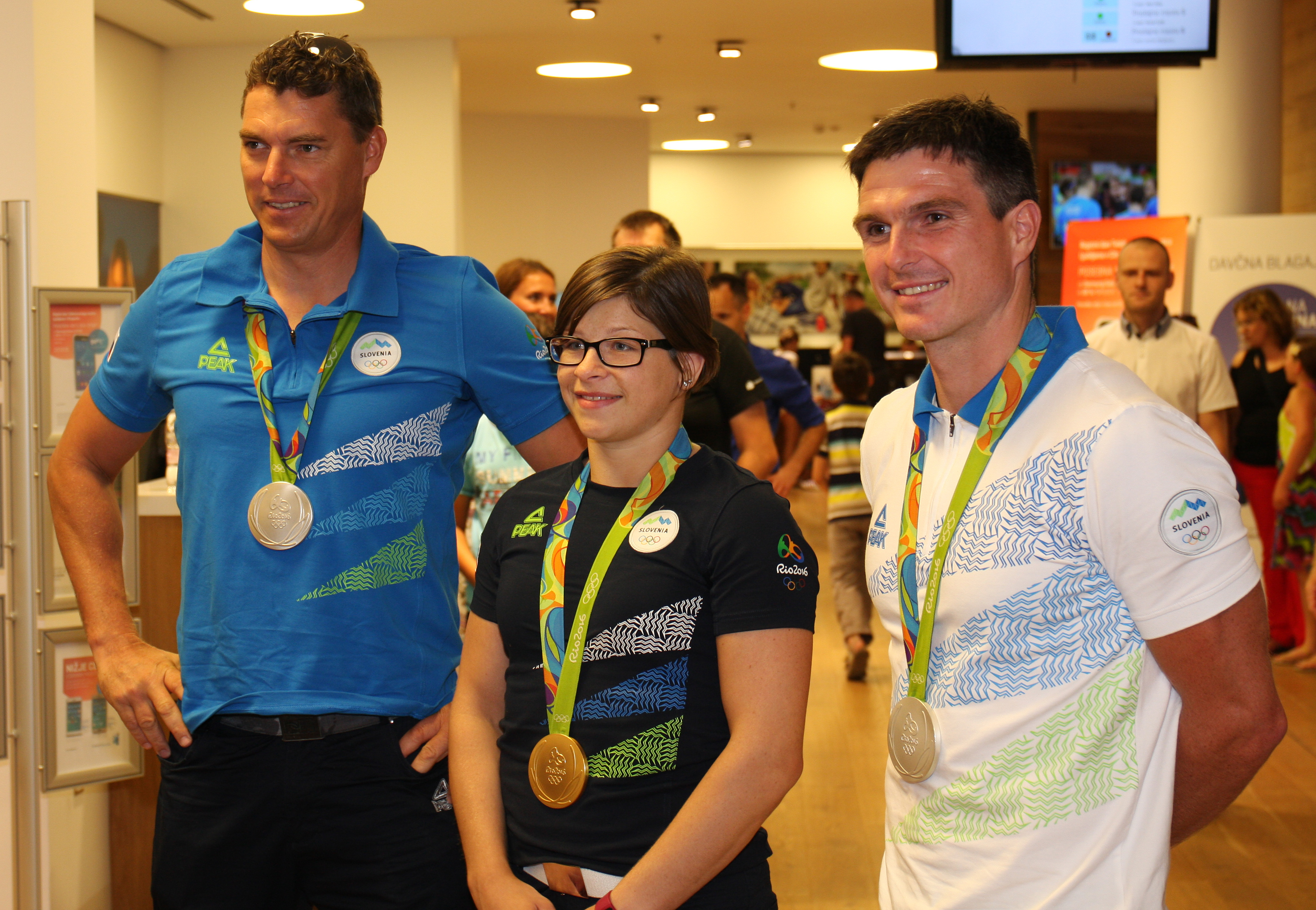
Three of four medalists at a promotional event in Ljubljana after the Games: Vasilij Žbogar (silver), Tina Trstenjak (gold) and Peter Kauzer (silver)

Slovenia competed at the 2016 Summer Olympics in Rio de Janeiro, Brazil, from 5 to 21 August 2016. This was the nation's seventh consecutive appearance at the Summer Olympics as an independent nation.

The Olympic Committee of Slovenia (Slovene: Olimpijski komite Slovenije) fielded a team of 63 athletes, 39 men and 24 women, across 12 sports at the Games. Men's handball was the only team sport in which Slovenia qualified for the Games, returning to the Olympics after being absent from the previous two editions.

Of the 63 participants, twenty-one of them had past Olympic experience, with sailor Vasilij Žbogar (bronze in Athens 2004 and silver in Beijing 2008) headed to his fifth straight Games as the most experienced competitor and a potential medal favorite in the Finn class. The only medalist returning from the previous Games to compete in Rio de Janeiro, Žbogar was selected by the committee to lead the Slovenian delegation as the flag bearer in the opening ceremony. Other notable Slovenian athletes included world judo champion Tina Trstenjak in the women's 63 kg, two-time slalom kayak world champion Peter Kauzer, and three-time world championship medalist in canoeing Benjamin Savšek.

Slovenia left Rio de Janeiro with four medals (1 gold, 2 silver, and 1 bronze), which matched its overall tally from both Athens 2004 and London 2012. Among the nation's medalists were Trstenjak, who succeeded Urška Žolnir to become the Olympic champion in the women's 63 kg; Kauzer, who improved upon his sixth-place feat from London by taking a silver in the men's slalom K-1; and Žbogar, who capped off his fifth Games with a silver and third medal overall of his Olympic career in the Finn class, making him one of the most successful Olympians in the history of independent Slovenia.

== Medalists ==
Medal	Name	Sport	Event	Date
Gold	Tina Trstenjak	Judo	Women's 63 kg	9 August
Silver	Peter Kauzer	Canoeing	Men's slalom K-1	10 August
Silver	Vasilij Žbogar	Sailing	Men's Finn	16 August
Bronze	Anamari Velenšek	Judo	Women's 78 kg	11 August

Medals by sport
Sport	1st place, gold medalist(s)	2nd place, silver medalist(s)	3rd place, bronze medalist(s)	Total
Judo	1	0	1	2
Canoeing	0	1	0	1
Sailing	0	1	0	1
Total	1	2	1	4

== Athletics ==
Slovenian athletes have so far achieved qualifying standards in the following athletics events (up to a maximum of 3 athletes in each event):

Key

- Note–Ranks given for track events are within the athlete's heat only
- Q = Qualified for the next round
- q = Qualified for the next round as a fastest loser or, in field events, by position without achieving the qualifying target
- NR = National record
- N/A = Round not applicable for the event
- Bye = Athlete not required to compete in round

Track & road events

Athlete	Event	Heat		Semifinal		Final	
Athlete	Event	Result	Rank	Result	Rank	Result	Rank
Luka Janežič	Men's 400 m	45.33	2 Q	45.07 NR	4	Did not advance	
Anton Kosmač	Men's marathon	—N/a				2:29:48	117
Žan Rudolf	Men's 800 m	1:46.93	5	Did not advance			
Daneja Grandovec	Women's marathon	—N/a				DNF	
Maja Mihalinec	Women's 200 m	23.38	6	Did not advance			
Sabina Veit	Women's 200 m	23.75	7	Did not advance			

Field events

Athlete	Event	Qualification		Final	
Athlete	Event	Distance	Position	Distance	Position
Robert Renner	Men's pole vault	5.45	22	Did not advance	
Maruša Černjul	Women's high jump	1.92	21	Did not advance	
Martina Ratej	Women's javelin throw	59.76	18	Did not advance	
Tina Šutej	Women's pole vault	4.55	8 Q	4.50	11

== Canoeing ==
=== Slalom ===
Slovenian canoeists have qualified a maximum of one boat in each of the following classes through the 2015 ICF Canoe Slalom World Championships.

Athlete	Event	Preliminary						Semifinal		Final	
Athlete	Event	Run 1	Rank	Run 2	Rank	Best	Rank	Time	Rank	Time	Rank
Benjamin Savšek	Men's C-1	99.69	7	94.36	3	94.36	4 Q	98.70	4 Q	99.36	6
Luka Božič; Sašo Taljat	Men's C-2	105.21	6	113.41	7	105.21	6 Q	111.14	7 Q	107.73	7
Peter Kauzer	Men's K-1	91.11	8	96.88	15	91.11	12 Q	91.01	4 Q	88.70	2nd place, silver medalist(s)
Urša Kragelj	Women's K-1	106.86	6	102.79	4	102.79	7 Q	108.37	9 Q	108.68	9

=== Sprint ===
Slovenian canoeists have qualified one boat in each of the following events through the 2015 ICF Canoe Sprint World Championships.

Athlete	Event	Heats		Semifinals		Final	
Athlete	Event	Time	Rank	Time	Rank	Time	Rank
Špela Ponomarenko	Women's K-1 200 m	40.38	2 Q	40.79	3 FA	40.76	4
Špela Ponomarenko	Women's K-1 500 m	1:55.93	5 Q	1:58.09	3 FB	1:57.54	10

Qualification Legend: FA = Qualify to final (medal); FB = Qualify to final B (non-medal)

== Cycling ==
=== Road ===
Slovenian riders qualified for a maximum of four quota places in the men's Olympic road race by virtue of their top 15 final national ranking in the 2015 UCI World and Europe Tour. One additional spot was awarded to the Slovenian cyclist in the women's road race by virtue of her top 100 individual placement in the 2016 UCI World Rankings.

Athlete	Event	Time	Rank
Matej Mohorič	Men's road race	Did not finish	
Jan Polanc	Men's road race	6:30:05	52
Primož Roglič	Men's road race	6:19:43	26
Primož Roglič	Men's time trial	1:14:55	10
Simon Špilak	Men's road race	6:30:05	57
Polona Batagelj	Women's road race	3:58:03	32

=== Mountain biking ===
Slovenian mountain bikers qualified for two women's quota places into the Olympic cross-country race, as a result of the nation's sixth-place finish in the UCI Olympic Ranking List of May 25, 2016.

Athlete	Event	Time	Rank
Tanja Žakelj	Women's cross-country	1:35.17	13

== Gymnastics ==
=== Artistic ===
Slovenia has entered one artistic gymnast into the Olympic competition. Teja Belak had claimed her Olympic spot in the women's apparatus and all-around events at the Olympic Test Event in Rio de Janeiro.

Women

Athlete	Event	Qualification						Final					
Athlete	Event	Apparatus				Total	Rank	Apparatus				Total	Rank
Athlete	Event	V	UB	BB	F	Total	Rank	V	UB	BB	F	Total	Rank
Teja Belak	Vault	13.650	—N/a			13.650	19	Did not advance					

== Handball ==
Summary

Key:

- ET – After extra time
- P – Match decided by penalty-shootout.

Team	Event	Group Stage						Quarterfinal	Semifinal	Final / BM	
Team	Event	Opposition Score	Opposition Score	Opposition Score	Opposition Score	Opposition Score	Rank	Opposition Score	Opposition Score	Opposition Score	Rank
Slovenia men's	Men's tournament	Egypt; W 27–26	Brazil; W 31–28	Sweden; W 29–24	Germany; L 25–28	Poland; W 25–20	2	Denmark; L 30–37	Did not advance		6

=== Men's tournament ===
The Slovenian men's handball team qualified for the Olympics by virtue of a top two finish at the second meet of the Olympic Qualification Tournament in Malmö, Sweden, signifying the nation's Olympic comeback to the sport for the first time since 2004.

Team roster

The following is the Slovenian roster in the men's handball tournament of the 2016 Summer Olympics. The caps and goals are updated as of 17 August 2016.

Head coach: (Montenegro) Veselin Vujović

No.	Pos.	Name	Date of birth (age)	Height	App.	Goals	Club
1	GK	Matevž Skok	2 September 1986 (aged 29)	1.88 m	62	0	(Croatia) Zagreb
3	P	Blaž Blagotinšek	17 January 1994 (aged 22)	2.02 m	35	35	(Hungary) Veszprém
5	LB	Nik Henigman	4 December 1995 (aged 20)	1.99 m	9	9	(Slovenia) Ribnica
7	RB	Vid Kavtičnik	24 May 1984 (aged 32)	1.91 m	168	474	(France) Montpellier Handball
8	RW	Blaž Janc	20 November 1996 (aged 19)	1.85 m	12	51	(Slovenia) Celje
11	RB	Jure Dolenec	6 December 1988 (aged 27)	1.90 m	104	373	(France) Montpellier Handball
12	GK	Gorazd Škof	11 July 1977 (aged 39)	1.88 m	187	0	(France) Paris Saint-Germain
13	LW	Darko Cingesar	25 July 1990 (aged 26)	1.87 m	34	54	(Croatia) Zagreb
15	P	Vid Poteko	5 April 1991 (aged 25)	1.94 m	32	13	(Slovenia) Celje
18	RB	David Miklavčič	29 January 1983 (aged 33)	1.95 m	95	140	(Croatia) Zagreb
22	P	Matej Gaber	22 July 1991 (aged 25)	1.97 m	94	112	(Hungary) MOL-Pick Szeged
23	CB	Uroš Zorman	9 January 1980 (aged 36)	1.90 m	224	519	(Poland) Vive Targi Kielce
25	CB	Marko Bezjak	26 June 1986 (aged 30)	1.84 m	89	146	(Germany) SC Magdeburg
31	LW	Simon Razgor	18 September 1985 (aged 30)	1.83 m	45	108	(Belarus) Meshkov Brest
32	CB	Miha Zarabec	21 October 1991 (age 34)	1.77 m	18	41	(Slovenia) Celje
44	CB	Dean Bombač	4 April 1989 (aged 26)	1.89 m	69	120	(Poland) Vive Targi Kielce
90	GK	Urban Lesjak	24 August 1990 (age 36)	1.88 m	25	0	(Slovenia) Celje

Group stage

Pos	Team	Pld	W	D	L	GF	GA	GD	Pts	Qualification
1	Germany	5	4	0	1	153	141	+12	8 (Note: Slovenia 25–28 Germany)	Quarter-finals
2	Slovenia	5	4	0	1	137	126	+11	8	Quarter-finals
3	Brazil (H)	5	2	1	2	141	150	−9	5	Quarter-finals
4	Poland	5	2	0	3	139	140	−1	4	Quarter-finals
5	Egypt	5	1	1	3	129	143	−14	3	
6	Sweden	5	1	0	4	132	131	+1	2	

Source: IHF
Rules for classification: 1) Points; 2) Head-to-head points; 3) Head-to-head goal difference; 4) Head-to-head goals scored; 5) Goal difference; 6) Goals scored; 7) Draw.
(H) Hosts
Notes:

7 August 2016; 21:50	Slovenia	27–26	Egypt	Future Arena, Rio de Janeiro; Referees: Pálsson, Elíasson (ISL)
7 August 2016; 21:50	Janc 8	(15–15)	El-Ahmar 7	Future Arena, Rio de Janeiro; Referees: Pálsson, Elíasson (ISL)
7 August 2016; 21:50	3× (yellow card) 9× (suspension)	Report	4× (yellow card) 5× (suspension) 1× (red card)	Future Arena, Rio de Janeiro; Referees: Pálsson, Elíasson (ISL)

9 August 2016; 16:40	Brazil	28–31	Slovenia	Future Arena, Rio de Janeiro; Referees: Gjeding, Hansen (DEN)
9 August 2016; 16:40	Chiuffa 8	(13–16)	Janc 6	Future Arena, Rio de Janeiro; Referees: Gjeding, Hansen (DEN)
9 August 2016; 16:40	2× (yellow card) 6× (suspension)	Report	2× (yellow card) 13× (suspension)	Future Arena, Rio de Janeiro; Referees: Gjeding, Hansen (DEN)

11 August 2016; 19:50	Slovenia	29–24	Sweden	Future Arena, Rio de Janeiro; Referees: Lopéz, Ramírez (ESP)
11 August 2016; 19:50	Janc, Razgor 5	(14–13)	Tollbring 6	Future Arena, Rio de Janeiro; Referees: Lopéz, Ramírez (ESP)
11 August 2016; 19:50	4× (yellow card) 7× (suspension)	Report	4× (yellow card) 6× (suspension)	Future Arena, Rio de Janeiro; Referees: Lopéz, Ramírez (ESP)

13 August 2016; 09:30	Slovenia	25–28	Germany	Future Arena, Rio de Janeiro; Referees: Nikolov, Nachevski (MKD)
13 August 2016; 09:30	Dolenec 6	(12–11)	Gensheimer 6	Future Arena, Rio de Janeiro; Referees: Nikolov, Nachevski (MKD)
13 August 2016; 09:30	4× (yellow card) 6× (suspension)	Report	4× (yellow card) 8× (suspension)	Future Arena, Rio de Janeiro; Referees: Nikolov, Nachevski (MKD)

15 August 2016; 09:30	Poland	20–25	Slovenia	Future Arena, Rio de Janeiro; Referees: Horáček, Novotný (CZE)
15 August 2016; 09:30	Bielecki 4	(13–13)	Zarabec 7	Future Arena, Rio de Janeiro; Referees: Horáček, Novotný (CZE)
15 August 2016; 09:30	2× (yellow card) 5× (suspension) 1× (red card)	Report	2× (yellow card) 8× (suspension)	Future Arena, Rio de Janeiro; Referees: Horáček, Novotný (CZE)

Quarterfinal

17 August 2016; 17:00	Denmark	37–30	Slovenia	Future Arena, Rio de Janeiro; Referees: Lopéz, Ramírez (ESP)
17 August 2016; 17:00	M. Hansen, L. Hansen 8	(16–13)	Bezjak, Janc 6	Future Arena, Rio de Janeiro; Referees: Lopéz, Ramírez (ESP)
17 August 2016; 17:00	3× (yellow card) 5× (suspension)	Report	4× (yellow card) 8× (suspension)	Future Arena, Rio de Janeiro; Referees: Lopéz, Ramírez (ESP)

== Judo ==
Slovenia has qualified a total of five judokas for the following weight classes at the Games. Mihael Žgank, Tina Trstenjak, Anamari Velenšek, and two-time Olympian Rok Drakšič were ranked among the top 22 eligible judokas for men and top 14 for women in the IJF World Ranking List of May 30, 2016, while Adrian Gomboc at men's half-lightweight (66 kg) earned a continental quota spot from the European region, as the highest-ranked Slovenian judoka outside of direct qualifying position.

Athlete	Event	Round of 64	Round of 32	Round of 16	Quarterfinals	Semifinals	Repechage	Final / BM	
Athlete	Event	Opposition Result	Opposition Result	Opposition Result	Opposition Result	Opposition Result	Opposition Result	Opposition Result	Rank
Adrian Gomboc	Men's −66 kg	Bye	Margvelashvili (GEO); W 100–000	Punza (ZAM); W 101–000	Bouchard (CAN); W 100–000	Basile (ITA); L 000–000 S	Bye	Sobirov (UZB); L 000–110	5
Rok Drakšič	Men's −73 kg	Bye	Muki (ISR); L 000–100	Did not advance					
Mihael Žgank	Men's −90 kg	Bye	Kukolj (SRB); L 000–100	Did not advance					
Tina Trstenjak	Women's −63 kg	—N/a	Bye	Gwend (ITA); W 000–000 S	Yang Jx (CHN); W 101–000	M Silva (BRA); W 101–000	Bye	Agbegnenou (FRA); W 101–000	1st place, gold medalist(s)
Anamari Velenšek	Women's −78 kg	—N/a	Bye	Turks (UKR); W 001–000	Castillo (CUB); W 100-000	Harrison (USA); L 000–100	Bye	Malzahn (GER); W 100–000	3rd place, bronze medalist(s)

== Sailing ==
Slovenian sailors have qualified one boat in each of the following classes through the 2014 ISAF Sailing World Championships, the individual Worlds, and European qualifying regattas.

Athlete	Event	Race											Net points	Final rank
Athlete	Event	1	2	3	4	5	6	7	8	9	10	M*	Net points	Final rank
Vasilij Žbogar	Men's Finn	3	1	7	10	~~15~~	8	5	4	9	8	6	68	2nd place, silver medalist(s)
Veronika Macarol; Tina Mrak	Women's 470	2	6	5	4	~~DSQ~~	12	4	DSQ	5	6	1	67	6

M = Medal race; EL = Eliminated – did not advance into the medal race

== Shooting ==
Slovenian shooters have achieved quota places for the following events by virtue of their best finishes at the 2014 and 2015 ISSF World Championships, the 2015 ISSF World Cup series, and European Championships or Games, as long as they obtained a minimum qualifying score (MQS) by March 31, 2016.

Athlete	Event	Qualification		Semifinal		Final	
Athlete	Event	Points	Rank	Points	Rank	Points	Rank
Boštjan Maček	Men's trap	113	22	Did not advance			
Živa Dvoršak	Women's 10 m air rifle	414.7	17	—N/a		Did not advance	
Živa Dvoršak	Women's 50 m rifle 3 positions	572	30	—N/a		Did not advance	

Qualification Legend: Q = Qualify for the next round; q = Qualify for the bronze medal (shotgun)

== Swimming ==
Slovenian swimmers have so far achieved qualifying standards in the following events (up to a maximum of 2 swimmers in each event at the Olympic Qualifying Time (OQT), and potentially 1 at the Olympic Selection Time (OST)):

Men

Athlete	Event	Heat		Semifinal		Final	
Athlete	Event	Time	Rank	Time	Rank	Time	Rank
Martin Bau	1500 m freestyle	15:29.95	36	—N/a		Did not advance	
Damir Dugonjič	100 m breaststroke	1:00.41	21	Did not advance			
Anže Tavčar	100 m freestyle	49.38	36	Did not advance			
Anže Tavčar	200 m freestyle	1:49.96	39	Did not advance			
Robert Žbogar	200 m butterfly	1:57.05	22	Did not advance			

Women

Athlete	Event	Heat		Semifinal		Final	
Athlete	Event	Time	Rank	Time	Rank	Time	Rank
Anja Klinar	400 m freestyle	4:09.07	18	—N/a		Did not advance	
Anja Klinar	800 m freestyle	DNS		—N/a		Did not advance	
Anja Klinar	200 m butterfly	2:08.43	14 Q	2:09.44	15	Did not advance	
Tjaša Oder	800 m freestyle	8:33.14	13	—N/a		Did not advance	
Špela Perše	10 km open water	—N/a				1:58.59	16
Tjaša Vozel	100 m breaststroke	1:11.15	35	Did not advance			
Anja Klinar; Tjaša Oder; Tjaša Pintar; Janja Šegel	4 × 200 m freestyle relay	8:02.22	15	—N/a		Did not advance	

== Table tennis ==
Slovenia has entered one athlete into the table tennis competition at the Games. 2012 Olympian Bojan Tokič secured one of ten available Olympic spots in the men's singles by winning the group final match at the European Qualification Tournament in Halmstad, Sweden.

Athlete	Event	Preliminary	Round 1	Round 2	Round 3	Round of 16	Quarterfinals	Semifinals	Final / BM	
Athlete	Event	Opposition Result	Opposition Result	Opposition Result	Opposition Result	Opposition Result	Opposition Result	Opposition Result	Opposition Result	Rank
Bojan Tokič	Men's singles	Bye	No Alamian (IRI); W 4–1	Wang Zy (POL); W 4–2	Apolónia (POR); W 4–1	Ovtcharov (GER); L 1–4	Did not advance			

== Tennis ==
Slovenia has entered one tennis player into the Olympic tournament. Due to the withdrawal of several tennis players from the Games, Polona Hercog (world no. 84) received a spare ITF Olympic place to compete in the women's singles, as the next highest-ranked eligible player, not yet qualified, in the WTA World Rankings as of June 6, 2016.

Athlete	Event	Round of 64	Round of 32	Round of 16	Quarterfinals	Semifinals	Final / BM	
Athlete	Event	Opposition Score	Opposition Score	Opposition Score	Opposition Score	Opposition Score	Opposition Score	Rank
Polona Hercog	Women's singles	Puig (PUR); L 3–6, 2–6	Did not advance					

== Triathlon ==
Slovenia has entered one triathlete to compete at the Games. London 2012 Olympian Mateja Šimic was ranked among the top 40 eligible triathletes in the women's event based on the ITU Olympic Qualification List as of May 15, 2016.

Athlete	Event	Swim (1.5 km)	Trans 1	Bike (40 km)	Trans 2	Run (10 km)	Total Time	Rank
Mateja Šimic	Women's	19:37	01:06	1:03:59	00:38	37:08	2:02.28	31

== See also ==
- Slovenia at the 2016 Summer Paralympics
