= Swimming at the 2020 Summer Olympics – Women's 1500 metre freestyle =

Women's 1500 metre freestyle at the Games of the XXXII Olympiad
- Venue: Tokyo Aquatics Centre
- Dates: 26 July 2021 (heats); 28 July 2021 (final)
- Competitors: 33 from 22 nations
- Winning time: 15:37.34

Medalists
1st place, gold medalist(s)		Katie Ledecky	United States
2nd place, silver medalist(s)		Erica Sullivan	United States
3rd place, bronze medalist(s)		Sarah Köhler	Germany

The women's 1500 metre freestyle event at the 2020 Summer Olympics was held in 2021 at the Tokyo Aquatics Centre. These Games marked the first time to feature women swimming in the pool longer than 800 metres.

== Summary ==
U.S. distance swimmer Katie Ledecky won gold in the inaugural Olympic women's 1500-meter freestyle, only an hour and 13 minutes after competing in the 200 m freestyle. The world-record holder in the event, Ledecky led from the start to finish in 15:37.34, almost two seconds off her Olympic record in the heats. Ledecky's teammate Erica Sullivan was not in contention for a podium finish at the halfway mark but surged over the latter half to claim silver in 15:41.41. The American pair's 1-2 finish represented the nation's first and only quinella in swimming events at these Games. While Germany's Sarah Köhler moved through the field after the first 800 m, she could not hold off the late charge from Sullivan, taking bronze one and a half seconds back in a German record of 15:42.91.

China's Wang Jianjiahe was in second place through the 400 but was overtaken by Sullivan and Köhler to place fourth. Italy's 2019 World champion Simona Quadarella could not replicate her performance from those Championships, falling to fifth in 15:53.97. Australians Kiah Melverton (16:00.36) and Maddy Gough (16:05.81) as well as ROC's Anastasia Kirpichnikova (16:00.38) rounded out the finalists.

The medals for the competition were presented by the U.S.' David Haggerty, IOC member, and the gifts were presented by the U.S.' Dale Neuburger, FINA Treasurer.

== Records ==
Prior to this competition, the existing world and Olympic records were as follows.

World record	Katie Ledecky (USA)	15:20.48	Indianapolis, United States	16 May 2018	
Olympic record	Inaugural event	—	—	—	—

The following records were established during the competition:

Date	Event	Swimmer	Nation	Time	Record
26 July	Heat 5	Katie Ledecky	United States	15:35.35	OR

== Qualification ==
The Olympic Qualifying Time for the event is 16:32.04. Up to two swimmers per National Olympic Committee (NOC) can automatically qualify by swimming that time at an approved qualification event. The Olympic Selection Time is 17:01.80. Up to one swimmer per NOC meeting that time is eligible for selection, allocated by world ranking until the maximum quota for all swimming events is reached. NOCs without a female swimmer qualified in any event can also use their universality place.

== Competition format ==
The competition consists of two rounds: heats and a final. The swimmers with the best 8 times in the heats advance to the final. Swim-offs are used as necessary to break ties for advancement to the next round.

== Schedule ==
All times are Japan Standard Time (UTC+9)

Date	Time	Round
26 July	20:32	Heats
28 July	11:54	Final

== Results ==
=== Heats ===
The swimmers with the top 8 times, regardless of heat, advance to the final.

Rank	Heat	Lane	Name	Nationality	Time	Notes
1	5	4	Katie Ledecky	United States	15:35.35	Q, OR
2	5	5	Wang Jianjiahe	China	15:41.49	Q, AS
3	4	3	Erica Sullivan	United States	15:46.67	Q
4	4	4	Simona Quadarella	Italy	15:47.34	Q
5	4	6	Anastasiya Kirpichnikova	ROC	15:50.22	Q, NR
6	5	3	Sarah Köhler	Germany	15:52.67	Q
7	4	5	Maddy Gough	Australia	15:56.81	Q
8	5	7	Kiah Melverton	Australia	15:58.96	Q
9	5	2	Ajna Késely	Hungary	15:59.80	
10	4	7	Li Bingjie	China	15:59.92	
11	4	1	Merve Tuncel	Turkey	16:00.51	
12	3	6	Viktória Mihályvári-Farkas	Hungary	16:02.26	
13	4	2	Martina Caramignoli	Italy	16:02.43	
14	5	8	Kristel Köbrich	Chile	16:09.09	
15	5	1	Mireia Belmonte	Spain	16:11.68	
16	3	5	Julia Hassler	Liechtenstein	16:12.55	NR
17	3	1	Deniz Ertan	Turkey	16:13.22	
18	4	8	Jimena Pérez	Spain	16:15.99	
19	2	4	Marlene Kahler	Austria	16:20.05	NR
20	3	3	Viviane Jungblut	Brazil	16:21.29	
21	1	4	Katrina Bellio	Canada	16:24.37	
22	3	7	Tamila Holub	Portugal	16:25.16	
23	3	2	Diana Durães	Portugal	16:29.15	
24	2	5	Beatriz Dizotti	Brazil	16:29.37	
25	2	6	Helena Rosendahl Bach	Denmark	16:29.56	
26	2	3	Eve Thomas	New Zealand	16:29.66	
27	3	4	Celine Rieder	Germany	16:32.57	
28	2	2	Han Da-kyung	South Korea	16:33.59	
29	5	6	Delfina Pignatiello	Argentina	16:33.69	
30	3	8	Katja Fain	Slovenia	16:35.92	
31	2	7	Hayley McIntosh	New Zealand	16:44.43	
32	1	5	Arianna Valloni	San Marino	16:54.64	
33	1	3	Sasha Gatt	Malta	16:57.47	

=== Final ===
Rank	Lane	Name	Nation	Time	Notes
1st place, gold medalist(s)	4	Katie Ledecky	United States	15:37.34	
2nd place, silver medalist(s)	3	Erica Sullivan	United States	15:41.41	
3rd place, bronze medalist(s)	7	Sarah Köhler	Germany	15:42.91	NR
4	5	Wang Jianjiahe	China	15:46.37	
5	6	Simona Quadarella	Italy	15:53.97	
6	8	Kiah Melverton	Australia	16:00.36	
7	2	Anastasiya Kirpichnikova	ROC	16:00.38	
8	1	Maddy Gough	Australia	16:05.81	

== See also ==
- Swimming at the 2020 Summer Olympics – Men's 1500 metre freestyle
