= Camilla Hattersley =

British swimmer (born 1995)

Personal information
- Nationality: British
- Born: 24 February 1995 (age 31)
- Height: 1.74 m (5.7 ft)

Sport
- Sport: Swimming
- College team: City of Glasgow
- Coach: Ian Wright

Camilla Hattersley (born 24 February 1995) is a British swimmer who competed for Scotland at the 2014 Commonwealth Games and won a silver medal at the 2015 British Swimming Championships. She competed in the women's 4 × 200 metre freestyle relay and 800 metre freestyle events at the 2016 Summer Olympics. She also competed in the 2018 Commonwealth Games.

== Personal life ==
Hattersley, also known as DJ Cami, was born on 24 February 1995. She attended Perth Academy in Perth, Scotland, before graduating with a degree in aeronautical engineering from the University of Glasgow.

== Career ==
In 2012, she carried the Olympic torch for the London 2012 games.

Hattersley competed for Scotland at the 2014 Commonwealth Games. She finished 7th in the 800m freestyle final. At the 2015 British Swimming Championships, she won a bronze medal in the 800m freestyle event. The following year she improved on this with a silver medal in the same event. She also finished joint 7th in the 400 metre freestyle final at the 2016 European Aquatics Championships.

In April 2016, Hattersley was selected to be part of the British swimming team at the 2016 Summer Olympics. She finished ninth in the 4x200 freestyle relay and 15th in the 800m freestyle.

In 2017, Hattersley she was a finalist in both the 800m Freestyle and the 4x200m Freestyle Relay at the World University Games. She was also a medalist at the British Swimming Championships that year.

She competed in the 2018 Commonwealth Games where she came 5th in the 800m Freestyle event and 7th in the 400m Freestyle.
