= Mireia Belmonte =

Spanish swimmer (born 1990)

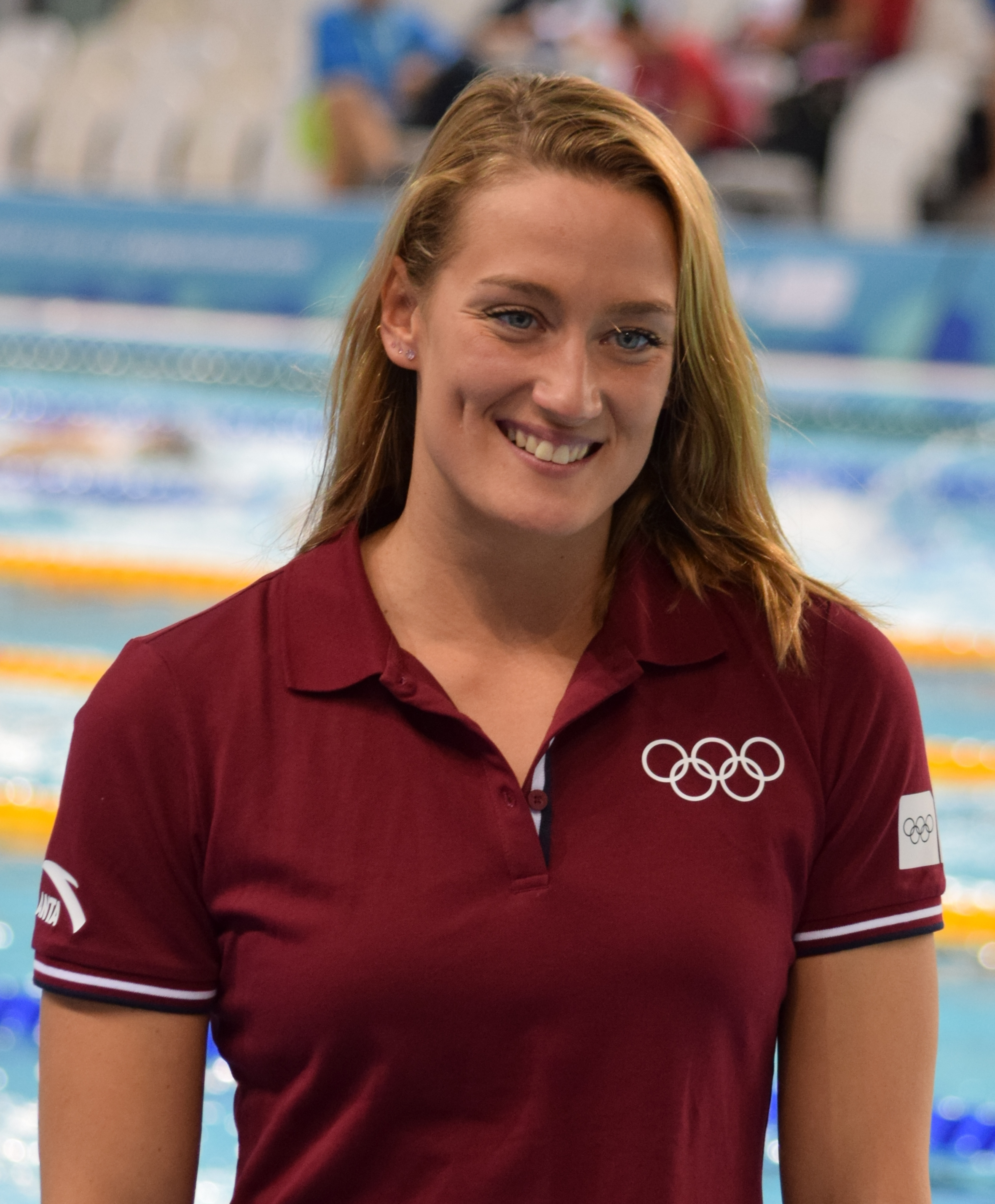
- Belmonte in 2018

Personal information
- Full name: Mireia Belmonte García
- National team: Spain
- Born: 10 November 1990 (age 36) Badalona, Spain
- Height: 1.70 m (5 ft 7 in)
- Weight: 60 kg (132 lb)

Sport
- Sport: Swimming
- Strokes: Freestyle, Butterfly, Individual Medley
- Club: UCAM Club Natación Fuensanta
Medal record
Women's swimming
Representing Spain
International aquatics competitions
| Event | 1st | 2nd | 3rd |
|---|---|---|---|
| Olympic Games | 1 | 2 | 1 |
| World Championships (LC) | 1 | 4 | 1 |
| World Championships (SC) | 7 | 2 | 1 |
| European Championships (LC) | 4 | 5 | 4 |
| European Championships (SC) | 9 | 2 | 0 |
| Mediterranean Games | 2 | 4 | 0 |
| Total | 24 | 20 | 7 |
Olympic Games
| Gold medal – first place | 2016 Rio de Janeiro | 200 m butterfly |
| Silver medal – second place | 2012 London | 800 m freestyle |
| Silver medal – second place | 2012 London | 200 m butterfly |
| Bronze medal – third place | 2016 Rio de Janeiro | 400 m medley |
World Championships (LC)
| Gold medal – first place | 2017 Budapest | 200 m butterfly |
| Silver medal – second place | 2013 Barcelona | 200 m butterfly |
| Silver medal – second place | 2013 Barcelona | 400 m medley |
| Silver medal – second place | 2017 Budapest | 1500 m freestyle |
| Silver medal – second place | 2017 Budapest | 400 m medley |
| Bronze medal – third place | 2013 Barcelona | 200 m medley |
World Championships (SC)
| Gold medal – first place | 2010 Dubai | 200 m butterfly |
| Gold medal – first place | 2010 Dubai | 200 m medley |
| Gold medal – first place | 2010 Dubai | 400 m medley |
| Gold medal – first place | 2014 Doha | 200 m butterfly |
| Gold medal – first place | 2014 Doha | 400 m medley |
| Gold medal – first place | 2014 Doha | 400 m freestyle |
| Gold medal – first place | 2014 Doha | 800 m freestyle |
| Silver medal – second place | 2008 Manchester | 200 m medley |
| Silver medal – second place | 2010 Dubai | 800 m freestyle |
| Bronze medal – third place | 2008 Manchester | 400 m medley |
European Championships (LC)
| Gold medal – first place | 2008 Eindhoven | 200 m medley |
| Gold medal – first place | 2012 Debrecen | 1500 m freestyle |
| Gold medal – first place | 2014 Berlin | 200 m butterfly |
| Gold medal – first place | 2014 Berlin | 1500 m freestyle |
| Silver medal – second place | 2012 Debrecen | 400 m freestyle |
| Silver medal – second place | 2014 Berlin | 400 m medley |
| Silver medal – second place | 2014 Berlin | 800 m freestyle |
| Silver medal – second place | 2016 London | 1500 m freestyle |
| Silver medal – second place | 2016 London | 4×200 m freestyle |
| Bronze medal – third place | 2008 Eindhoven | 200 m butterfly |
| Bronze medal – third place | 2014 Berlin | 400 m freestyle |
| Bronze medal – third place | 2014 Berlin | 5 km open water |
| Bronze medal – third place | 2016 London | 400 m freestyle |
European Championships (SC)
| Gold medal – first place | 2008 Rijeka | 400 m medley |
| Gold medal – first place | 2011 Szczecin | 400 m freestyle |
| Gold medal – first place | 2011 Szczecin | 200 m butterfly |
| Gold medal – first place | 2011 Szczecin | 200 m medley |
| Gold medal – first place | 2011 Szczecin | 400 m medley |
| Gold medal – first place | 2013 Herning | 400 m freestyle |
| Gold medal – first place | 2013 Herning | 800 m freestyle |
| Gold medal – first place | 2013 Herning | 200 m butterfly |
| Gold medal – first place | 2013 Herning | 400 m medley |
| Silver medal – second place | 2007 Debrecen | 400 m medley |
| Silver medal – second place | 2009 Istanbul | 400 m medley |
Mediterranean Games
| Gold medal – first place | 2018 Tarragona | 200 m medley |
| Gold medal – first place | 2018 Tarragona | 200 m butterfly |
| Silver medal – second place | 2009 Pescara | 200 m butterfly |
| Silver medal – second place | 2009 Pescara | 200 m medley |
| Silver medal – second place | 2018 Tarragona | 800 m freestyle |
| Silver medal – second place | 2018 Tarragona | 400 m freestyle |

Olympics official video: Belmonte Olympic champion in 200 m butterfly

Mireia Belmonte García (born 10 November 1990) is a Spanish Olympic, world, and European champion swimmer. She is the former world record holder in the short course 200 metre butterfly, 400 metre individual medley, 400 metre freestyle, 800 metre freestyle, and 1500 metre freestyle. She was the first Spanish woman to win a gold medal in swimming at an Olympic Games and is widely considered to be the greatest Spanish swimmer of all time.

At the 2016 Olympic Games in Rio de Janeiro she became Olympic champion in the 200-metre butterfly, and also won the bronze medal in the 400-metre individual medley. She previously competed at the 2008 Beijing Olympic Games, where she debuted at 17 years old, and at 2012 London, where she won two silver medals, one in the 200 metre butterfly with a time of 2:05.25 and one in the 800-metre freestyle with a time of 8:18.76.

== Early years ==
Mireia's parents, José Belmonte (from Freila, Granada) and Paqui García (from Huelma, Jaén), moved to Catalonia and the family has always lived in the La Salut quarter of Badalona.

She was advised to swim at the age of 5 by her doctor. Club Natació Badalona (in Catalan) was the swimming club where she started to compete. In 2003, she obtained a scholarship from Federación Catalana de Natación (in Catalan) to train at the Centro de Alto Rendimiento (High Performance Center, CAR) in Sant Cugat del Vallès. Her coach was Jordi Murio when she was signed by Club Natació L'Hospitalet (in Catalan). After 6 years in this club, she was signed in the 2007/08 season by Club Natació Sabadell (in Catalan). She continued training at the CAR with her new coach, Carles Subirana. In 2009 she left the CAR and moved to the Club Natación Sabadell to train with Michael Piper and later Fred Vernoux.

== Swimming career ==
=== 2006 Youth World Championships ===
At the 2006 FINA Youth World Championships, she was the Junior World Champion in the 400-metre freestyle and in the 400-metre individual medley, and the Junior European Champion in the 200-metre freestyle and in the 400-metre individual medley.

=== 2007 European Championships ===
The following year, training with Carles Subirana, she reached the second place in the 400-metre individual medley at the 2007 European Short Course Swimming Championships with 4:31.06, just behind the Italian Alessia Filippi. She also qualified to compete at the 2008 Summer Olympics.

=== 2008 ===
==== 2008 European Aquatics Championships ====
On 21 March, at the 2008 European Long Course Championships held in Eindhoven, Netherlands, Belmonte won the 200-metre individual medley breaking the Championships record with her time of 2:11.16. She also placed eighth in the 400-metre individual medley. Later in the year, at the 2008 European Short Course Swimming Championships held in Rijeka, Croatia in December, she won the 400 metre individual medley gold medal in a new world record time of 4:25:06. The record was previously held by the American swimmer Julia Smit, who set a time of 4:25.87 on 28 November 2008 in Toronto, Canada.

==== 2008 Summer Olympics ====
At the 2008 Summer Olympics held in Beijing, China in August 2008, Belmonte competed in three individual events and one relay representing Spain in swimming.

She competed in the 200-metre breaststroke finishing in 24th place in the prelims heats with a time of 2:29.46. In the 200-metre individual medley, she advanced to the semifinals where she finished 7th in Semifinal 1 with a time of 2:13.45. For the 400-metre individual medley she finished 14th with a time of 4:37.91 in the prelims heats.

2008 Summer Olympics
| Event | Time | Rank |
| 400 m Individual Medley | 4:37.91 | 14th |
| 200 m Individual Medley | 2:13.45 | 14th |
| 200 m Breaststroke | 2:29.46 | 24th |
| 4 x 100 m Medley Relay | 4:06.40 | 15th |

In the 4x100 metre medley relay, Belmonte swam the breaststroke leg of the relay in a time of 1:10.46 with Nina Zhivanevskaya swimming the backstroke leg, Ángela San Juan swimming the butterfly leg, and María Fuster swimming the freestyle leg. The relay finished 15th in the prelims heats with a time of 4:06.40 and did not advance to the final.

==== 2008 European Swimming Championships ====
December 2008 at the 2008 European Swimming Championships held in Rijeka, Croatia, Belmonte competed in multiple events. In the 400-metre individual medley she swam a 4:25.06 breaking the world record.

=== 2010 World Swimming Championships ===
Although the season 2009–2010 was not very good for her, Belmonte recovered her best form and appeared strengthened when she arrived at the 2010 FINA World Swimming Championships, where she achieved a very remarkable performance, winning three gold medals: the 200-metre butterfly, the 200-metre medley and the 400-metre medley and a silver medal in the 800-metre freestyle, in which she was only surpassed by her teammate Érika Villaécija.

=== 2011 XII Spanish Championship ===
In 2011 at the XII Championship of Spain, she swam the best time of the year in the 400-metre medley and a new record with 4:24.91. She also reached a record in the 200-metre butterfly with 2:06:25, obtaining the minimum marks for the World Championships in Shanghai at three different distances. Also in 2011 she was at the head in the Holland competition of the 800-metre freestyle, beating the record of Spain with 8:22.78.

=== 2012 Summer Olympics ===
2012 Summer Olympics
| Silver medal – second place | 200 m butterfly | 2:05.25 (NR) |
| Silver medal – second place | 800 m freestyle | 8:18.76 (NR) |

In August 2012 Belmonte won two silver medals at the 2012 Summer Olympics in London. The first medal she won was a silver medal in the 200-metre butterfly. Not only was it her first Olympic medal, it was the first medal won by a Spanish-born woman in swimming at an Olympic Games, and it was the first medal for Spain in any sport at the 2012 Summer Olympics. Her second medal was also a silver medal, this time in the 800-metre freestyle behind 15-year-old Katie Ledecky and ahead of world record holder Rebecca Adlington. She became the first Spanish swimmer to win two Olympic medals.

Belmonte competed in four events in addition to the two she medaled in. In the 400-metre freestyle she finished 13th in the prelims heats, in the 200-metre individual medley she placed 10th in the semifinals, in the 400-metre individual medley she placed 8th in the final, and she placed 10th in the prelims heats of the 4x200-metre freestyle relay swimming the relay's anchoring leg.

=== 2013 ===
==== 2013 World Aquatics Championships ====
After four months without training, she was presented as a member of the team of the Universidad Católica San Antonio de Murcia on 21 January, with a federative license for the UCAM Club Natación Fuensanta. Thus, she could combine her studies in Business Management with her training in Sabadell (Barcelona) through a blended learning program.

That year, at the 2013 World Aquatics Championships held in Barcelona, Belmonte competes in six events during the eight days of competition. On 29 July, she won the bronze medal in the 200-metre individual medley. On 1 August, she won the silver medal in the 200-metre butterfly. On 4 August, the last day of the championships, she won her second silver medal, this time in the 400-metre individual medley. On 5 August, she was honored in her birthplace, Badalona, where he was received by hundreds of fans and decorated by the Mayor Xavier García Albiol in an institutional act.

==== 2013 Swimming World Cup ====
At the 2013 FINA Swimming World Cup held in Berlin, Germany in August 2013 and conducted in short course metres, Belmonte set two world records in distance freestyle events. On 10 August, she broke the world record in the 800-metre freestyle, becoming the first woman to achieve a time under 8 minutes. Her time of 7:59.34 broke the former world record held by Camille Muffat by more than 1.5 seconds. The next day, 11 August, she broke the world record for the 400-metre freestyle with a time of 3:54.52, more than 3 tenths of a second faster than the previous world record set by Camille Muffat.

==== 2013 Spanish and European Championships ====
At the 2013 Spanish Championships in Castellón de la Plana, Spain, Belmonte swam a 15:26.95 in the short course 1500-metre freestyle on 29 November, setting a new world record in the event. On 12 December, at the 2013 European Short Course Swimming Championships held in Herning (Denmark), Mireia won the gold medal in the 200-metre butterfly, beating the continental record in at time of 2:01.52.19. The next day, she won another gold medal in the 800-metre freestyle with a time of 8:05.18. She defeated the local heroine Lotte Friis in that final.

=== 2014 ===
==== 2014 World Swimming Championships ====
2014 World Championships
| Gold medal – first place | 200 m butterfly | 1:59.61 (WR) |
| Gold medal – first place | 400 m individual medley | 4:19.86 (WR) |
| Gold medal – first place | 800 m freestyle | 8:03.41 (CR) |
| Gold medal – first place | 400 m freestyle | 3:55.76 (CR) |

On 3 December 2014 at the 12th FINA World Swimming Championships in Doha, Qatar, Belmonte won two gold medals. One in the 200-metre butterfly and one in the 400-metre individual medley. At the same time she achieved the world record with substantial time improvements, making her the first female swimmer to go under 2 minutes in the 200-metre butterfly with her time of 1:59.61. Belmonte lowered the world record by 1.17 seconds and finished ahead of second-place finisher Katinka Hosszú by more than 1.5 seconds. Approximately 45 minutes later, she also set a new world record with her gold medal-winning time of 4:19.86 in the 400-metre individual medley, lowering the world record by 99 hundredths of a second and finishing over 3 seconds ahead of second-place finisher Katinka Hosszú.

One day later, 4 December, Belmonte won her third gold medal, this time in the 800-metre freestyle. Her time of 8:03.41 in the final was a new Championship Record and a few seconds off her world record of 7:59.34 in the event. The following day, she won her fourth gold medal. She swam a 3:55.76 in the 400-metre freestyle final setting a new Championship Record and a little over a second behind her world record time of 3:54.52.

==== 2014 Spanish Championships ====
On 12 December, at the 2014 Spanish Championships conducted in short course metres, Belmonte broke the world record in the 1500-metre freestyle, setting a new world record of 15:19.71, which lowered the record over seven full seconds from the former mark of 15:26.95 by Lauren Boyle of New Zealand.

=== 2015 World Aquatics Championships ===
For the 2015 World Aquatics Championships, held in Kazan, Russia, Belmonte was unable to participate due to a chronic shoulder injury. Belmonte said that her goal was to prepare for the 2016 Rio Olympic Games, although she had tried to be at the World Championships until the very last moment.

=== 2016 Summer Olympics ===
2016 Summer Olympics
| Gold medal – first place | 200 m butterfly | 2:04.85 |
| Bronze medal – third place | 400 m individual medley | 4:32.39 |

In Rio de Janeiro, Brazil at the 2016 Summer Olympics Belmonte won a bronze medal in the 400-metre individual medley on 6 August. Her bronze medal was the first medal for Spain in any sport at the 2016 Summer Olympics. In the prelims heats of the 400-metre freestyle on 7 August, Belmonte ranked 15th with a time of 4:08.12 and did not advance to the final. The next day, in the 200-metre individual medley on 8 August, Belmonte ranked 15th in the prelims heats and qualified for the semifinals where she ranked 16th overall and did not advance to the final.

Belmonte achieved a historic victory for Spain by winning the gold medal in the 200-metre butterfly on 10 August in a time of 2:04.85, which was 3 hundredths of a second ahead of the silver medalist, Australian swimmer Madeline Groves. She was the first Spanish female swimmer to become an Olympic champion. Her gold medal was the first gold medal in the swimming pool at an Olympic Games for a Spanish swimmer of any gender since 1992. On 11 August, Belmonte ranked eighth in the prelims heats of the 800-metre freestyle, qualifying for the final. The next day, 12 August, she finished fourth with a time of 8:18.55 in the final.

Belmonte's two new Olympic medals added to her previous two medals won at the 2012 Summer Olympics to amount to four total Olympic medals. Only three Spaniards before her had won four Olympic medals, making her the fourth to do so. She was one medal shy of tying the most decorated Olympic Games athlete of Spain at the time, canoeist David Cal, who won a total of five medals.

=== 2017 ===
==== 2017 World Aquatics Championships ====
2017 World Championships
| Gold medal – first place | 200 m butterfly | 2:05.26 |
| Silver medal – second place | 1500 m freestyle | 15:50.89 (NR) |
| Silver medal – second place | 400 m individual medley | 4:32.17 |

At the 2017 World Aquatics Championships held in Budapest, Hungary in July 2017 and conducted in long course metres, Belmonte won a total of three medals in individual events. She won her first medal, a silver medal in the 1500-metre freestyle with a time of 15:50.89, on 25 July ahead of bronze medalist Simona Quadarella and behind gold medalist Katie Ledecky. Belmonte's time of 15:50.89 was a new Spanish record for the women's long course 1500-metre freestyle. The second medal she won was a gold medal in the 200-metre butterfly, the same event she won gold in at the 2016 Summer Olympic Games in Rio, on 27 July. Belmonte was highlighted by FINA as shining on day five of the swimming competitions for her win. Belmonte shared her excitement about the win with Diario AS, "I still can't believe it. This golden medal was the only one which was missing from my collection. Rio was the best moment in my life, but this is an important moment. The key to win this final was the first 100 metres." The third medal Belmonte won, with a time of 4:32.17, was a silver medal in the 400-metre individual medley on 30 July.

In addition to the events she medaled in, Belmonte competed in the 800-metre freestyle ranking fourth in the final behind Leah Smith on 29 July. She also ranked 10th in the heats of the 400-metre freestyle on 23 July and 20th in the heats of the 200-metre individual medley on the same day. At the end of the meet when points were totaled for each swimmer as part of the FINA Trophy, Belmonte ranked seventh out of all competitors, ahead of Chinese distance-freestyle swimmer Sun Yang who took eighth place and behind British breaststroke swimmer Adam Peaty who took sixth place.

==== 2017 Swimming World Cup ====
At the 2017 FINA Swimming World Cup held in the Netherlands in August 2017, Belmonte broke the world record in the short course 400-metre individual medley with her time of 4:18.94. She lowered the former world record set by Katinka Hosszú in 2015 by more than half a second.

=== 2018 Mediterranean Games ===
Belmonte competed in multiple individual events, earning four medals for Spain, in June 2018 at the Mediterranean Games in Tarragona. She won a gold medal in the 200-metre butterfly and a gold medal in the 200-metre individual medley. In the 400-metre freestyle, Belmonte won the silver medal. Her swim in the 800-metre freestyle earned her the silver medal in the event. She also competed in the 400-metre individual medley, finishing seventh in the final.

=== 2021 ===
==== 2020 Olympic Games build-up ====
Belmonte qualified for the 2020 Summer Olympics, held in July and August 2021 due to the COVID-19 pandemic, in the 800-metre freestyle and the 1500-metre freestyle at the 2020 Open Castalia Castelión held in Castellón, Spain in December 2020. In May 2021 Belmonte was officially confirmed by the Spanish Olympic Committee as one of two flag bearers for Spain at the Opening Ceremony of the 2020 Summer Olympics in Tokyo, Japan on 23 July 2021.

As part of the 2021 Sette Colli Trophy from 25 to 27 June 2021 in Rome, Belmonte entered to swim the 200-metre butterfly and 400-metre individual medley in an attempt to qualify to compete in those events at the 2020 Summer Olympics. Belmonte won bronze in the 400-metre individual medley with a time of 4:39.37 on 26 June. On 27 June, she swam a 2:13.63 in the 200-metre butterfly. SwimSwam later confirmed that if the Royal Spanish Swimming Federation approved, Belmonte could swim the 200-meter butterfly and 400-meter individual medley at the 2020 Olympics as well as the two events she had already qualified in. On 14 July, FINA released that Belmonte was entered in three individual events for the 2020 Olympics: 1500-metre freestyle, 800-metre freestyle, and 400-metre individual medley.

==== 2020 Summer Olympics ====
At the Tokyo 2020 Olympics Opening Ceremony on 23 July, Belmonte was one of 86 swimmers serving as a flag bearer for their nation, contributing to the sport of swimming being the most represented sport in terms of number of flag bearers at the ceremony. The first day of swimming competition, 24 July 2021, Belmonte advanced to the final of the 400-metre individual medley with her fourth-place finish in a time of 4:35.88. She finished in fourth place in the final, behind American Hali Flickinger and ahead of Hungarian Katinka Hosszú. On 26 July, in the debut of the 1500-metre freestyle for women at the Olympic Games, Belmonte swam a 16:11.68, ranked fifteenth overall, and did not qualify for the final. On the sixth day of competition, 29 July, Belmonte competed in the prelims heats of the 800-metre freestyle, swam a 8:26.71, and did not advance to the final of the event. The following day, she swam the butterfly leg of the 4×100-metre medley relay, placed 16th with her relay teammates in the prelims and did not advance to the final.

==== 2021 International Swimming League ====
Belmonte decided not to take part in the draft process to compete in the 2021 International Swimming League, spanning August to December 2021, in part due to health issues.

=== 2022 ===
On 5 August, Belmonte was announced to the official Spain roster for the 2022 European Aquatics Championships. On day three of competition, she placed tenth in the preliminaries of the 400-metre individual medley with a time of 4:48.19 and achieved first-alternate status for the final. For the preliminaries of the 200-metre individual medley, she finished in a time of 2:15.91, ranked eleventh, and qualified for the semifinals. She placed seventh in semifinal heat two, fourteenth overall in the semifinals, with a time of 2:15.47. Day six, she ranked fifteenth in the preliminaries of the 200-metre butterfly with a time of 2:16.75 and qualified for the semifinals. She followed up with a 2:14.01 in the semifinals, ranking eleventh and not advancing to the final. The final day of competition, she placed seventeenth in the 400-metre freestyle with a time of 4:18.33.

Later in the year, on 22 October 2022 at the year's Swimming World Cup stop in Berlin, Germany, Belmonte placed fifth in the 400-metre individual medley on day two with a time of 4:35.63. In her four other individual events during the three day competition, she placed fourteenth in the 200 metre individual medley with a 2:13.70, sixteenth in the 400 metre freestyle with a 4:11.63, eighteenth in the 200 metre butterfly with a 2:14.59, and thirty-first in the 100 metre butterfly with a 1:02.15.

== International championships (50 m and open water) ==
| Meet | 400 free | 800 free | 1500 free | 200 breast | 200 fly | 200 medley | 400 medley | 4×200 free | 4×100 medley | 5 km open water |
|---|---|---|---|---|---|---|---|---|---|---|
| WC 2007 | | | | | 22nd | 19th | 12th | | | |
| EC 2008 | | | | | 3rd place, bronze medalist(s) | 1st place, gold medalist(s) | 8th | 8th | 6th | —N/a |
| OG 2008 | | | —N/a | 24th | | 14th | 14th | | 15th | —N/a |
| WC 2009 | | | | | 28th | 22nd | DSQ | | | |
| WC 2011 | | DNS | | | 9th | 10th | 4th | | | |
| EC 2012 | 2nd place, silver medalist(s) | | 1st place, gold medalist(s) | | 4th | | | DSQ | | —N/a |
| OG 2012 | 13th | 2nd place, silver medalist(s) | —N/a | | 2nd place, silver medalist(s) | 10th | 8th | 10th | | —N/a |
| WC 2013 | 9th | 5th | 4th | | 2nd place, silver medalist(s) | 3rd place, bronze medalist(s) | 2nd place, silver medalist(s) | 5th | | |
| EC 2014 | 3rd place, bronze medalist(s) | 2nd place, silver medalist(s) | 1st place, gold medalist(s) | | 1st place, gold medalist(s) | 8th | 2nd place, silver medalist(s) | 6th | | 3rd place, bronze medalist(s) |
| EC 2016 | 3rd place, bronze medalist(s) | | 2nd place, silver medalist(s) | | 12th | | | 2nd place, silver medalist(s) | | |
| OG 2016 | 15th | 4th | —N/a | | 1st place, gold medalist(s) | 16th | 3rd place, bronze medalist(s) | | | —N/a |
| WC 2017 | 10th | 4th | 2nd place, silver medalist(s) | | 1st place, gold medalist(s) | 20th | 2nd place, silver medalist(s) | | | |
| MG 2018 | 2nd place, silver medalist(s) | 2nd place, silver medalist(s) | —N/a | | 1st place, gold medalist(s) | 1st place, gold medalist(s) | 7th | | | —N/a |
| WC 2019 | 15th | 8th | 8th | | 16th | 21st | 13th | | | |
| OG 2020 | | 14th | 15th | | | | 4th | | 16th | —N/a |
| EC 2022 | 17th | | | | 11th | 14th | 10th | | | |

== International championships (25 m) ==
| Meet | 400 free | 800 free | 200 breast | 200 fly | 100 medley | 200 medley | 400 medley |
|---|---|---|---|---|---|---|---|
| WC 2008 | 9th | | 6th | | | 2nd place, silver medalist(s) | 3rd place, bronze medalist(s) |
| EC 2008 | 13th | | 14th | | | 6th | 1st place, gold medalist(s) |
| EC 2009 | | | DSQ | DSQ | | | 2nd place, silver medalist(s) |
| WC 2010 | | 2nd place, silver medalist(s) | 19th | 1st place, gold medalist(s) | 28th | 1st place, gold medalist(s) | 1st place, gold medalist(s) |
| EC 2011 | 1st place, gold medalist(s) | | | 1st place, gold medalist(s) | 13th (h,WD) | 1st place, gold medalist(s) | 1st place, gold medalist(s) |
| EC 2013 | 1st place, gold medalist(s) | 1st place, gold medalist(s) | | 1st place, gold medalist(s) | | 4th | 1st place, gold medalist(s) |
| WC 2014 | 1st place, gold medalist(s) | 1st place, gold medalist(s) | | 1st place, gold medalist(s) | 27th | 10th | 1st place, gold medalist(s) |
| WC 2016 | DNS | DNS | | 19th | | DNS | 5th |

== Personal best times ==
=== Long course metres (50 m pool) ===
| Event | Time | | Meet | Location | Date | Notes | Ref |
|---|---|---|---|---|---|---|---|
| 400 m freestyle | 4:03.84 | | 2014 Spanish Open Spring Championships | Spain | 10 April 2014 | | |
| 800 m freestyle | 8:18.55 | | 2016 Summer Olympics | Rio de Janeiro, Brazil | 12 August 2016 | NR | |
| 1500 m freestyle | 15:50.89 | | 2017 World Aquatics Championships | Budapest, Hungary | 25 July 2017 | NR | |
| 200 m breaststroke | 2:29.46 | h | 2008 Summer Olympics | Beijing, China | 13 August 2008 | | |
| 200 m butterfly | 2:04.78 | | 2013 World Aquatics Championships | Barcelona | 1 August 2013 | NR | |
| 200 m individual medley | 2:09.45 | | 2013 World Aquatics Championships | Barcelona | 29 July 2013 | NR | |
| 400 m individual medley | 4:31.21 | | 2013 World Aquatics Championships | Barcelona | 4 August 2013 | NR | |

Legend: NR – Spanish record; e – equalled existing record;
Records not set in finals: h – heat; sf – semifinal; r – relay 1st leg; rh – relay heat 1st leg; b – B final; † – en route to final mark; so – swim-off; tt – time trial

=== Short course metres (25 m pool) ===
| Event | Time | | Meet | Location | Date | Notes | Ref |
|---|---|---|---|---|---|---|---|
| 400 m freestyle | 3:54.52 | | 2013 FINA Swimming World Cup | Berlin, Germany | 11 August 2013 | ER, Former WR | |
| 800 m freestyle | 7:59.34 | | 2013 FINA Swimming World Cup | Berlin, Germany | 10 August 2013 | ER, Former WR | |
| 1500 m freestyle | 15:19.71 | | 2014 Spanish Championships | Sabadell, Spain | 12 December 2014 | NR, Former WR | |
| 200 m breaststroke | 2:21.65 | | 2008 World Swimming Championships | Manchester, England | 13 April 2008 | | |
| 100 m butterfly | 58.24 | † | 2014 World Swimming Championships | Doha, Qatar | 3 December 2014 | NR | |
| 200 m butterfly | 1:59.61 | | 2014 World Swimming Championships | Doha, Qatar | 3 December 2014 | WR | |
| 200 m individual medley | 2:05.73 | | 2010 World Swimming Championships | Dubai, United Arab Emirates | 18 December 2010 | NR | |
| 400 m individual medley | 4:18.94 | | 2017 FINA Swimming World Cup | Eindhoven, Netherlands | 12 August 2017 | WR | |

Legend: WR – World record; ER – European record; NR – Spanish record; e – equalled existing record;
Records not set in finals: h – heat; sf – semifinal; r – relay 1st leg; rh – relay heat 1st leg; b – B final; † – en route to final mark; so – swim-off; tt – time trial

== Olympic Games ==
| Olympic Games | Location | Date | Start time | Event | Stage | Rank | Time | Age | Ref |
|---|---|---|---|---|---|---|---|---|---|
| 2008 Summer Olympics | National Aquatics Center, Beijing, China | 9 August 2008 | 19:48 | 400 m individual medley | heats | 14 | 4:37.91 | 17 | |
| 2008 Summer Olympics | National Aquatics Center, Beijing, China | 11 August 2008 | 19:41 | 200 m individual medley | heats | 14 | 2:12.75 | 17 | |
| 2008 Summer Olympics | National Aquatics Center, Beijing, China | 12 August 2008 | 11:26 | 200 m individual medley | semifinals | 14 | 2:13.45 | 17 | |
| 2008 Summer Olympics | National Aquatics Center, Beijing, China | 13 August 2008 | 19:18 | 200 m breaststroke | heats | 24 | 2:29.46 | 17 | |
| 2008 Summer Olympics | National Aquatics Center, Beijing, China | 15 August 2008 | 20:32 | 4 × 100 m medley relay (breaststroke) | heats | 15 | 4:06.40 (1:10.46) | 17 | |
| 2012 Summer Olympics | Aquatics Centre, London, United Kingdom | 28 July 2012 | 11:17 | 400 m individual medley | heats | 5 | 4:34.70 | 21 | |
| 2012 Summer Olympics | Aquatics Centre, London, United Kingdom | 28 July 2012 | 20:11 | 400 m individual medley | final | 8 | 4:35.62 | 21 | |
| 2012 Summer Olympics | Aquatics Centre, London, United Kingdom | 29 July 2012 | 11:23 | 400 m freestyle | heats | 13 | 4:08.23 | 21 | |
| 2012 Summer Olympics | Aquatics Centre, London, United Kingdom | 30 July 2012 | 10:41 | 200 m individual medley | heats | 6 | 2:11.73 | 21 | |
| 2012 Summer Olympics | Aquatics Centre, London, United Kingdom | 30 July 2012 | 20:55 | 200 m individual medley | semifinals | 10 | 2:11.54 | 21 | |
| 2012 Summer Olympics | Aquatics Centre, London, United Kingdom | 31 July 2012 | 10:23 | 200 m butterfly | heats | 9 | 2:08.19 | 21 | |
| 2012 Summer Olympics | Aquatics Centre, London, United Kingdom | 31 July 2012 | 19:57 | 200 m butterfly | semifinals | 4 | 2:06.62 | 21 | |
| 2012 Summer Olympics | Aquatics Centre, London, United Kingdom | 1 August 2012 | 11:26 | 4 × 200 m freestyle relay (fourth leg) | heats | 10 | 7:54.59 (1:59.18) | 21 | |
| 2012 Summer Olympics | Aquatics Centre, London, United Kingdom | 1 August 2012 | 20:12 | 200 m butterfly | final | 2 | 2:05.25 | 21 | |
| 2012 Summer Olympics | Aquatics Centre, London, United Kingdom | 2 August 2012 | 10:19 | 800 m freestyle | heats | 4 | 8:25.26 | 21 | |
| 2012 Summer Olympics | Aquatics Centre, London, United Kingdom | 3 August 2012 | 19:45 | 800 m freestyle | final | 2 | 8:18.76 | 21 | |
| 2016 Summer Olympics | Olympic Aquatics Stadium, Rio de Janeiro, Brazil | 6 August 2016 | 14:32 | 400 m individual medley | heats | 2 | 4:32.75 | 25 | |
| 2016 Summer Olympics | Olympic Aquatics Stadium, Rio de Janeiro, Brazil | 6 August 2016 | 22:49 | 400 m individual medley | final | 3 | 4:32.39 | 25 | |
| 2016 Summer Olympics | Olympic Aquatics Stadium, Rio de Janeiro, Brazil | 7 August 2016 | 14:28 | 400 m freestyle | heats | 15 | 4:08.12 | 25 | |
| 2016 Summer Olympics | Olympic Aquatics Stadium, Rio de Janeiro, Brazil | 8 August 2016 | 13:56 | 200 m individual medley | heats | 15 | 2:12.58 | 25 | |
| 2016 Summer Olympics | Olympic Aquatics Stadium, Rio de Janeiro, Brazil | 8 August 2016 | 23:36 | 200 m individual medley | semifinals | 16 | 2:13.33 | 25 | |
| 2016 Summer Olympics | Olympic Aquatics Stadium, Rio de Janeiro, Brazil | 9 August 2016 | 13:28 | 200 m butterfly | heats | 1 | 2:06.64 | 25 | |
| 2016 Summer Olympics | Olympic Aquatics Stadium, Rio de Janeiro, Brazil | 9 August 2016 | 22:37 | 200 m butterfly | semifinals | 2 | 2:06.06 | 25 | |
| 2016 Summer Olympics | Olympic Aquatics Stadium, Rio de Janeiro, Brazil | 10 August 2016 | 22:54 | 200 m butterfly | final | 1 | 2:04.85 | 25 | |
| 2016 Summer Olympics | Olympic Aquatics Stadium, Rio de Janeiro, Brazil | 11 August 2016 | 13:26 | 800 m freestyle | heats | 8 | 8:25.55 | 25 | |
| 2016 Summer Olympics | Olympic Aquatics Stadium, Rio de Janeiro, Brazil | 12 August 2016 | 22:20 | 800 m freestyle | final | 4 | 8:18.55 | 25 | |
| 2020 Summer Olympics | Olympic Aquatics Centre, Tokyo, Japan | 24 July 2021 | 20:05 | 400 m individual medley | heats | 4 | 4:35.88 | 30 | |
| 2020 Summer Olympics | Olympic Aquatics Centre, Tokyo, Japan | 25 July 2021 | 11:12 | 400 m individual medley | final | 4 | 4:35.13 | 30 | |
| 2020 Summer Olympics | Olympic Aquatics Centre, Tokyo, Japan | 26 July 2021 | 19:53 | 1500 m freestyle | heats | 15 | 16:11.68 | 30 | |
| 2020 Summer Olympics | Olympic Aquatics Centre, Tokyo, Japan | 29 July 2021 | 19:00 | 800 m freestyle | heats | 14 | 8:26.71 | 30 | |
| 2020 Summer Olympics | Olympic Aquatics Centre, Tokyo, Japan | 30 July 2021 | 20:57 | 4 × 100 m medley relay (butterfly) | heats | 16 | 4:04.14 (1:00.88) | 30 | |

Belmonte has swum in the heats of every event she has competed in at the Olympic Games including every relay she has been a member of.

Totals:

- Metres swam (stroke): 12,100 metres (total); 6,300 metres (individual freestyle); 4,000 metres (individual medley); 1,200 metres (individual butterfly); 200 metres (individual breaststroke); 200 metres (relay freestyle); 100 metres (relay breaststroke); 100 metres (relay butterfly).
- Stages swam (count): total stages (31); heats (19); semifinals (5); final (7).
- Distinct events (# of Olympic Games competed in for event): total of 9 distinct events (4 Olympic Games); 400-metre individual medley (4); 800-metre freestyle (3); 200-metre individual medley (3); 200-metre butterfly (2); 400-metre freestyle (2); 4x100-metre medley relay (2); 1500-metre freestyle (1); 200-metre breaststroke (1); 4x200-metre freestyle relay (1).

== Swimming World Cup circuits ==
The following medals Belmonte has won at Swimming World Cup circuits.

| Edition | Gold medals | Silver medals | Bronze medals | Total |
|---|---|---|---|---|
| 2009 | 2 | 0 | 0 | 2 |
| 2013 | 8 | 8 | 9 | 25 |
| 2014 | 13 | 15 | 2 | 30 |
| 2017 | 5 | 2 | 1 | 8 |
| 2019 | 1 | 2 | 2 | 5 |
| Total | 29 | 27 | 14 | 70 |

== World records ==
=== Short course metres (25 m pool) ===
| No. | Event | Time | Meet | Date | Location | Duration | Ref |
|---|---|---|---|---|---|---|---|
| 1 | 400 m individual medley | 4:25.06 | 2008 European Swimming Championships | 14 December 2008 | Rijeka, Croatia | 11 months, 8 days | |
| 2 | 800 m freestyle | 7:59.34 | 2013 FINA Swimming World Cup | 10 August 2013 | Berlin, Germany | 9 years, 2 months, 26 days | |
| 3 | 400 m freestyle | 3:54.52 | 2013 FINA Swimming World Cup | 11 August 2013 | Berlin, Germany | 5 years, 1 month, 23 days | |
| 4 | 1500 m freestyle | 15:26.95 | Spanish Championships | 29 November 2013 | Castellón de la Plana, Spain | 1 year, 8 months, 11 days | |
| 5 | 200 m butterfly | 1:59.61 | 2014 World Swimming Championships | 3 December 2014 | Doha, Qatar | Current | |
| 6 | 400 m individual medley (2) | 4:19.86 | 2014 World Swimming Championships | 3 December 2014 | Doha, Qatar | 11 months, 29 days | |
| 7 | 1500 m freestyle (2) | 15:19.71 | Spanish Championships | 12 December 2014 | Sabadell, Spain | 4 years, 11 months, 4 days | |
| 8 | 400 m individual medley (3) | 4:18.94 | 2017 FINA Swimming World Cup | 12 August 2017 | Eindhoven, Netherlands | Current | |

== Awards and honours ==
- In 2013, Belmonte received the Premio Reina Sofía, also known as Best Spanish Sportswoman, award of the annual set of Premios Nacionales del Deporte awarded to Spanish athletes. The award ceremony was held in Madrid at the Royal Palace of El Pardo.
- In 2017, the award for "Best Spanish Sportswoman in History" from newspaper Diario AS went to Belmonte for her accomplishments in the sport of swimming. The award was part of the newspaper's 50th Anniversary Awards gala that were held in celebration of the newspaper's 50th anniversary.
- On 1 January 2020, SwimSwam revealed they ranked Belmonte as #11 in the Top 20 Swimmers internationally for the 2010 to 2019 decade.
- For the 2021 year, SwimSwam ranked Belmonte as #73 on their list of Top 100 female swimmers for the year.

== See also ==
- List of Olympic medalists in swimming (women)
- List of Spanish records in swimming
- List of European records in swimming
- List of World Aquatics Championships medalists in swimming (women)
- World record progression 200 metres butterfly
- World record progression 400 metres freestyle
- World record progression 400 metres individual medley
- World record progression 800 metres freestyle
- World record progression 1500 metres freestyle

Records
| Preceded by (China) Liu Zige | Women's 200 metres butterfly world record holder (short course); 3 December 2014–12 December 2024 | Succeeded by (Canada) Summer McIntosh |
| Preceded by (United States) Julia Smit (Hungary) Katinka Hosszú (Hungary) Katinka Hosszú | Women's 400 metres individual medley world record holder (short course); 14 December 2008 – 22 November 2009; 3 December 2014 – 2 December 2015; 12 August 2017 – 14 December 2024 | Succeeded by (South Africa) Katheryn Meaklim (Hungary) Katinka Hosszú (Canada) Summer McIntosh |
| Preceded by (France) Camille Muffat | Women's 400 metre freestyle world record holder (short course); 11 August 2013 – 4 October 2018 | Succeeded by (China) Wang Jianjiahe |
| Preceded by (France) Camille Muffat | Women's 800 metre freestyle world record holder (short course); 10 August 2013 – 5 November 2022 | Succeeded by (United States) Katie Ledecky |
| Preceded by (Denmark) Lotte Friis (New Zealand) Lauren Boyle | Women's 1500 metre freestyle world record holder (short course); 29 November 2013 – 9 August 2014; 12 December 2014 – 16 November 2019 | Succeeded by (New Zealand) Lauren Boyle (Germany) Sarah Köhler |
Awards
| Preceded by Marina Alabau | Spanish Sportswoman of the Year; 2013 | Succeeded by Carolina Marín |
Olympic Games
| Preceded by Rafael Nadal | Flagbearer for Spain (with Saúl Craviotto ) Tokyo 2020 | Succeeded by Incumbent |
