= Jazmin Carlin =

British swimmer (born 1990)

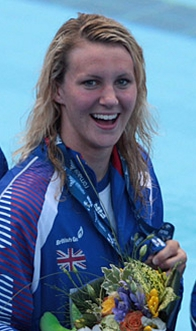
- Carlin in 2009

Personal information
- Full name: Jazmin Roxy Carlin
- Nickname: "Jazz"
- National team: Great Britain; Wales
- Born: 17 September 1990 (age 35) Swindon, England
- Height: 1.75 m (5 ft 9 in)
- Weight: 57 kg (126 lb; 9.0 st)

Sport
- Sport: Swimming
- Strokes: Freestyle
- Club: Swansea ITC and University of Bath
Medal record
Women's swimming
Representing Great Britain
| Event | 1st | 2nd | 3rd |
|---|---|---|---|
| Olympic Games | 0 | 2 | 0 |
| World Championships (LC) | 0 | 0 | 2 |
| World Championships (SC) | 0 | 1 | 0 |
| European Championships(LC) | 2 | 2 | 1 |
| European Championships | 2 | 0 | 0 |
| Commonwealth Games | 1 | 2 | 1 |
| Total | 5 | 7 | 4 |
Olympic Games
| Silver medal – second place | 2016 Rio de Janeiro | 400 m freestyle |
| Silver medal – second place | 2016 Rio de Janeiro | 800 m freestyle |
World Championships (LC)
| Bronze medal – third place | 2009 Rome | 4×200 m freestyle |
| Bronze medal – third place | 2015 Kazan | 800 m freestyle |
World Championships (SC)
| Silver medal – second place | 2014 Doha | 800 m freestyle |
European Championships (LC)
| Gold medal – first place | 2014 Berlin | 400 m freestyle |
| Gold medal – first place | 2014 Berlin | 800 m freestyle |
| Silver medal – second place | 2016 London | 800 m freestyle |
| Silver medal – second place | 2016 London | 400 m freestyle |
| Bronze medal – third place | 2010 Budapest | 4×200 m freestyle |
European Championships (SC)
| Gold medal – first place | 2015 Netanya | 400 m freestyle |
| Gold medal – first place | 2015 Netanya | 800 m freestyle |
Representing Wales
Commonwealth Games
| Gold medal – first place | 2014 Glasgow | 800 m freestyle |
| Silver medal – second place | 2010 Delhi | 200 m freestyle |
| Silver medal – second place | 2014 Glasgow | 400 m freestyle |
| Bronze medal – third place | 2010 Delhi | 400 m freestyle |

Jazmin Roxy "Jazz" Carlin (born 17 September 1990) is a former British competitive swimmer, who previously represented Wales and the Great Britain swimming team. She competed primarily in endurance freestyle events, and was based at the University of Bath. She won gold for Wales at the 2014 Commonwealth Games, double gold for Great Britain in the 400 metres and 800 metres freestyle at both the 2014 European Championships (long course) and the 2015 European Championships (short course) before winning two silver medals for Great Britain in the same events behind Katie Ledecky at the 2016 Summer Olympics.

== Career ==
Carlin was born in Swindon, Wiltshire, England. She moved to Swansea, Wales, with her parents (both of whom have Welsh heritage) in 2006, to train at the Wales National Pool. In her international debut at the European Short Course Swimming Championships 2005 in Trieste, Italy, Carlin failed to qualify past the heats of the 200 and 400-metre freestyle. At the 2006 Commonwealth Games in Melbourne, Australia, competing for Wales, she finished eighth in the 800-metre freestyle and finished third in the heats of the 400-metre freestyle. Together with Bethan Coole, Julie Gould and Cari-Fflur Davies she finished sixth in the 4 × 200 m freestyle relay. At the 2008 European Short Course Swimming Championships in Rijeka, Croatia, Carlin was eliminated in the heats of the 200 and 400 metre freestyle. At the 2009 World Aquatics Championships in Rome, Italy, Carlin, along with Joanne Jackson, Caitlin McClatchey and Rebecca Adlington won the bronze medal in the 4x200-metre freestyle relay with a time of 7:45.51, a European record. At the 2010 Commonwealth Games, Carlin won a silver medal in the women's 200-metre freestyle and a bronze medal in the women's 400-metre freestyle.

In November 2010, Carlin was announced as one of the six nominees of the BBC Cymru Wales Sports Personality of the Year 2010.

In the 2014 Commonwealth Games in Glasgow, Carlin won a gold medal in the 800-metre freestyle and a silver in the 400-metre freestyle. She was the first Welsh female swimmer to win a Commonwealth title since Pat Beavan at the 1974 Commonwealth Games.

At the 2016 Olympics in Rio, she won a silver medal in the 400 metres freestyle and the 800 metres freestyle.

In 2018, Carlin started Open Water Swimming competing in the European Open Water Championships in Loch Lomond.

Outside of competition, Carlin is a qualified personal trainer.

In February 2019, Carlin announced her retirement from competitive swimming, at the age of 28.

== Personal bests ==
Personal bests
| Event | Time | Date |
|---|---|---|
| 200 m freestyle (long course) | 1:56.88 | 2015 |
| 400 m freestyle (long course) | 4:01.23 | 2016 |
| 800 m freestyle (long course) | 8:15.54 | 2014 |
| 1500 m freestyle (long course) | 15:47.26 | 2013 |
| 200 m freestyle (short course) | 1:57.35 | 2014 |
| 400 m freestyle (short course) | 3:58.81 | 2015 |
| 800 m freestyle (short course) | 8:08.16 | 2014 |

== See also ==
- List of European records in swimming
- List of World Aquatics Championships medalists in swimming (women)
- List of Commonwealth Games medallists in swimming (women)
