= Boglárka Kapás =

Hungarian swimmer (born 1993)

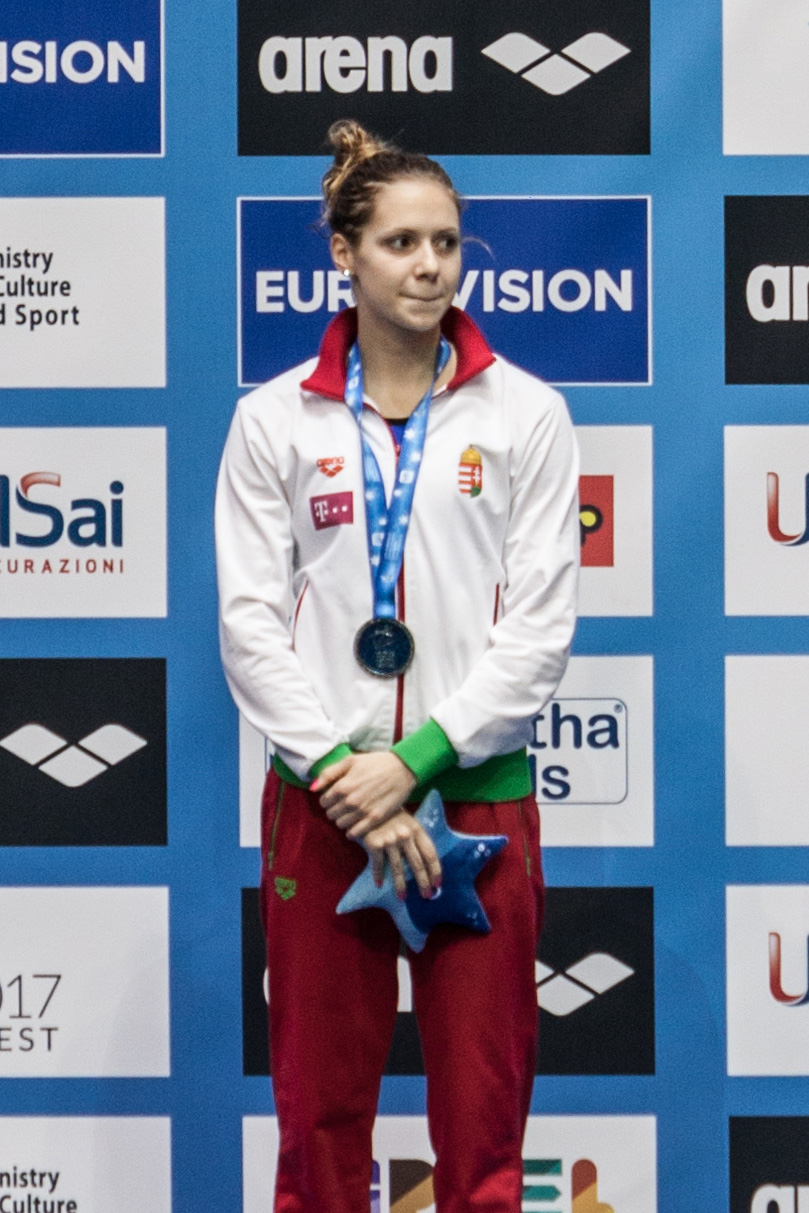

Personal information
- National team: Hungary
- Born: 22 April 1993 (age 33) Debrecen, Hungary
- Height: 1.68 m (5 ft 6 in)
- Weight: 52 kg (115 lb)

Sport
- Sport: Swimming
- Strokes: Freestyle
- Club: BVSC-Zugló (2001–15); Újpesti TE (2016–)
- Coach: Balázs Nagy (–2015); Ferenc Virth, Ferenc Kovácshegyi (2016–)
Medal record
Women's swimming
Representing Hungary
Olympic Games
Bronze medal – third place	2016 Rio de Janeiro	800 m freestyle
World Championships (LC)
Gold medal – first place	2019 Gwangju	200 m butterfly
Bronze medal – third place	2015 Kazan	1500 m freestyle
European Championships (LC)
Gold medal – first place	2012 Debrecen	800 m freestyle
Gold medal – first place	2016 London	400 m freestyle
Gold medal – first place	2016 London	800 m freestyle
Gold medal – first place	2016 London	1500 m freestyle
Gold medal – first place	2016 London	4×200 m freestyle
Gold medal – first place	2018 Glasgow	200 m butterfly
Gold medal – first place	2020 Budapest	200 m butterfly
Silver medal – second place	2014 Berlin	1500 m freestyle
Silver medal – second place	2020 Budapest	4×200 m freestyle
Bronze medal – third place	2014 Berlin	800 m freestyle
Bronze medal – third place	2014 Berlin	4×200 m freestyle
Bronze medal – third place	2020 Budapest	400 m freestyle
Bronze medal – third place	2024 Belgrade	200 m butterfly
European Championships (SC)
Gold medal – first place	2017 Copenhagen	400 m freestyle
Silver medal – second place	2010 Eindhoven	800 m freestyle
Silver medal – second place	2015 Netanya	800 m freestyle
Silver medal – second place	2017 Copenhagen	800 m freestyle
Bronze medal – third place	2015 Netanya	400 m freestyle
Youth Olympic Games
Gold medal – first place	2010 Singapore	200 m butterfly
Gold medal – first place	2010 Singapore	400 m freestyle
Silver medal – second place	2010 Singapore	200 m freestyle

Boglárka Kapás (pronounced [ˈboɡlaːrkɒ ˈkɒpaːʃ]; born 22 April 1993) is a Hungarian retired competitive swimmer. She is the world champion (2019 Gwangju) in 200 m butterfly and a bronze medallist at the Olympic Games (2016 Rio de Janeiro) in 800 m freestyle.

== Career ==
Kapás won Hungary's first ever gold medal at the 2010 Summer Youth Olympics in 200 m butterfly. Qualified for the final with the best time, she swam a personal best 2:08.72, finishing 1.4 seconds ahead of second placed Judit Ignacio. She won one more gold medal in 400 m freestyle and a silver medal in 200 m freestyle.

At the 2010 European Short Course Swimming Championships in Eindhoven Kapás won the silver medal in 800m freestyle, with a time of 8:18.56. The event was notable in that it was a heat-declared result (medals based on times from heats with no final swum), where Kapás won the heat for the top seeded swimmers by a comfortable margin; however, lost the event to Federica Pellegrini who had raced earlier in the 'slower' heat.

She passed the Olympic A-standard in 800m freestyle and earned a quota for the Games at the first meeting of the 2011 Mare Nostrum series in early June. In July 2011 at the 2011 Swimming World Championships she set a new national record in the same distance with a time of 8:24.79, which was enough for the fifth place. In November Kapás suffered a rib injury, that forced her to miss both the 2011 European Short Course Swimming Championships and the United States–Europe swimming gala.

After returning from injury, Kapás won the 800m freestyle event of the 2012 European Aquatics Championships on home soil in Debrecen.

At the 2016 Summer Olympics in Rio, Kapás came third in the 800m freestyle behind Katie Ledecky and Jazz Carlin, thus getting the bronze medal. She set a new national record time for this event of 8:16:37.

At the 2019 World Aquatics Championships she won the gold medal in the 200m butterfly event.

In the 2019 ISL season she was in team London Roar and they got the second place in the first ISL final in history. In 2020 she changed teams and was part of the NY Breakers and swam in the semi-finals.

She participated in her 5th consecutive Olympics in Paris in 2024, with the first one being Beijing in 2008.

== Personal life ==
Kapás, who goes by the nickname "Bogi," is married to fellow Hungarian swimmer Ádám Telegdy. She has two cats named Vanilla and Csoki, which means “chocolate.” She cites winning a maths contest in elementary school as one of her most memorable accomplishments.

== Awards ==
- Hungarian Junior Athlete of the Year – the National Sports Association (NSSZ) awards: 2010
- MOB Junior award (2010)
- Junior Príma award (2010)
- Hungarian swimmer of the Year: 2011
- Cross of Merit of Hungary – Bronze Cross (2012)
- For Újpest award (2016)
- Cross of Merit of Hungary – Golden Cross (2016)
- Budapest Pro Urbe award (2016)
