= Katarina Simonović =

Serbian swimmer (born 1994)

Personal information
- Native name: Катарина Саша Симоновић
- Full name: Katarina Saša Simonović
- Nickname: Kat
- Born: 25 October 1994 (age 31) Mesa, Arizona, U.S.
- Height: 164 cm (5 ft 5 in)
- Weight: 64 kg (141 lb)

Sport
- Sport: Swimming
- College team: Arizona State Sun Devils

Katarina Saša Simonović (Serbian Cyrillic: Катарина Саша Симоновић; born 25 October 1994) is a Serbian swimmer. She competed in the women's 400 metre freestyle event at the 2016 Summer Olympics.

Born and raised in Mesa, Arizona, Simonović has dual citizenship. Both of her parents are from Serbia.
