= Paulina Piechota =

Polish swimmer

Personal information
- Nationality: Polish
- Born: 14 May 1999 (age 27)

Sport
- Sport: Swimming

Paulina Piechota (born 14 May 1999) is a Polish swimmer. She competed in the women's 800 metre freestyle event at the 2017 World Aquatics Championships.
