= Maj Howardsen =

Danish swimmer

Personal information
- Born: 12 January 1997 (age 29)

Sport
- Sport: Swimming

Maj Howardsen (born 12 January 1997) is a Danish swimmer. She competed in the women's 200 metre butterfly event at the 2017 World Aquatics Championships.
