= Sarah Köhler =

German swimmer

Sarah Wellbrock
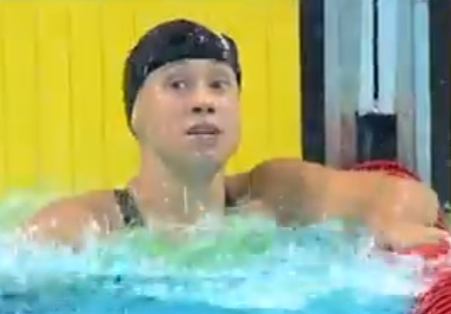
- At the 2017 Summer Universiade

Personal information
- Nationality: German
- Born: 20 June 1994 (age 32) Hanau, Germany
- Height: 1.79 m (5 ft 10 in)
- Weight: 67 kg (148 lb)

Sport
- Sport: Swimming
- Strokes: Freestyle
- Club: SG Frankfurt
Medal record
Representing Germany
Event	1st	2nd	3rd
Olympic Games	0	0	1
World Championships (LC)	1	1	0
European Championships (LC)	0	2	1
European Championships (SC)	1	1	0
Total	2	4	2
Olympic Games
Bronze medal – third place	2020 Tokyo	1500 m freestyle
World Championships
Gold medal – first place	2019 Gwangju	Team open water
Silver medal – second place	2019 Gwangju	1500 m freestyle
European Championships (LC)
Silver medal – second place	2018 Glasgow	1500 m freestyle
Silver medal – second place	2018 Glasgow	Team open water
Bronze medal – third place	2018 Glasgow	4×200 m freestyle
European Championships (SC)
Gold medal – first place	2017 Copenhagen	800 m freestyle
Silver medal – second place	2017 Copenhagen	400 m freestyle

Sarah Wellbrock (née Köhler; born 20 June 1994) is a retired German swimmer, former World record holder, who won gold medal at 2019 World Championships and gold in 2017 European Swimming Championships (SC). She represented her country at the 2016 Summer Olympics. In the women's 400 metre freestyle, she finished 10th in the heats and did not qualify for the final. In the women's 800 metre freestyle, she finished in 8th place. She was also a member of the 4 × 200 m freestyle relay team which finished 12th in the heats and did not qualify for the final.

== 2020 Summer Olympics ==
Köhler qualified to represent Germany at the 2020 Summer Olympics. In the women's 1500 metre freestyle, she finished 6th in the heats and qualified for the final, winning the bronze medal.

== Awards ==
- SwimSwam Top 100 (Women's): 2022 (#41)

== Personal life ==
In January 2022, Köhler married distance freestyle swimmer Florian Wellbrock of Germany, they got engaged in December 2020.

Records
Preceded by Mireia Belmonte	Women's 1500 metre freestyle world record holder (short course); 16 November 2019 – 29 October 22	Succeeded by Katie Ledecky
