= María Vilas =

Spanish swimmer (born 1996)

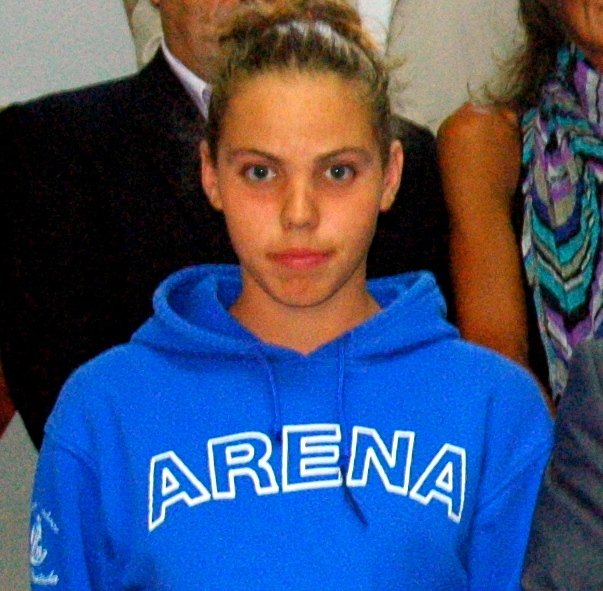
- María Vilas in 2011

Personal information
- Full name: María Vilas Vidal
- Nationality: Spanish
- Born: 31 May 1996 (age 30)
- Height: 168 cm (5 ft 6 in)
- Weight: 64 kg (141 lb)

Sport
- Sport: Swimming

María Vilas Vidal (born 31 May 1996) is a Spanish swimmer. She competed in the women's 800 metre freestyle event at the 2016 Summer Olympics.

== Career ==
In the 2010 European Cup held in Catania, Italy, she won two gold medals in competitions 200m breaststroke and 400 m freestyle, a silver medal in the 200 m freestyle (22/02/91) and three bronze medals in the 100 m breaststroke and the 4 x 100 m freestyle relay and 4 x 200 M.

In 2016, Privamera Open Championship in Sabadell, Spain, she managed to qualify for the Olympics for the first time. In addition, he surpassed the Galician record 400 freestyle of Bea Gómez with a time of 6 4.38,81.

In the 2016 Summer Olympics, she participated in swimming events women's 800 meters freestyle and 400 medley women's singles.
