= Tjaša Oder =

Slovenian swimmer (born 1994)

Personal information
- Born: 22 June 1994 (age 32) Slovenj Gradec, Slovenia
Medal record
Women's swimming
Representing Slovenia
European Championships
Bronze medal – third place	2016 London	800 m freestyle
Mediterranean Games
Bronze medal – third place	2018 Tarragona	800 m Freestyle

Tjaša Oder (born 22 June 1994 in Slovenj Gradec) is a Slovenian swimmer. At the 2012 Summer Olympics, she competed in the Women's 800 metre freestyle, finishing in 25th place overall in the heats, failing to qualify for the final.

In 2019, she represented Slovenia at the 2019 World Aquatics Championships held in Gwangju, South Korea. She competed in the women's 800 metre freestyle and women's 1500 metre freestyle events. In both events she did not advance to compete in the final.
