= Gaja Natlačen =

Slovenian swimmer

Personal information
- Born: 12 June 1997 (age 29)

Sport
- Sport: Swimming

Gaja Natlačen (born 12 June 1997) is a Slovenian swimmer. She competed in the women's 200 metre freestyle event at the 2017 World Aquatics Championships.
