= Martina Elhenická =

Czech swimmer

Personal information
- Born: 10 October 1993 (age 32)

Sport
- Sport: Swimming

Martina Elhenická (born 10 October 1993) is a Czech swimmer. She competed in the women's 1500 metre freestyle event at the 2017 World Aquatics Championships.
