= Diletta Carli =

Italian swimmer (born 1996)

Medal record

Women's Swimming

Representing Italy

European Championships (LC)
Gold medal – first place	2012 Debrecen	4×200 m freestyle

Mediterranean Games
Gold medal – first place	2013 Mersin	4x200 m freestyle
Bronze medal – third place	2013 Mersin	200 m freestyle

Diletta Carli (born 7 May 1996 in Pietrasanta) is an Italian swimmer. She competed in the 4 × 200 metre freestyle relay event at the 2012 Summer Olympics.

Carli an athlete of the Gruppo Sportivo Fiamme Oro.
