= Swimming at the 2011 World Aquatics Championships – Women's 1500 metre freestyle =

Women's 1500 metre freestyle at the 2011 World Aquatics Championships
- Dates: July 25, 2011 (heats); July 26, 2011 (final)
- Competitors: 26 from 23 nations
- Winning time: 15:49.59

Medalists
gold medal	Lotte Friis	Denmark
silver medal	Kate Ziegler	United States
bronze medal	Li Xuanxu	China

The Women's 1500 Freestyle event at the 2011 FINA World Championships was held on July 25 and 26, 2011 in Shanghai, China. Preliminary heats were swum July 25, with the top-8 swimmers advancing to swim again in the final on July 26.

== Records ==
Prior to this competition, the existing world and championship records were as follows:

World record	Kate Ziegler (USA)	15:42.54	Mission Viejo, United States	27 June 2007
Championship record	Alessia Filippi (ITA)	15:44.93	Rome, Italy	28 July 2009

== Results ==
=== Heats ===
26 swimmer participated in 4 heats.

Rank	Heat	Lane	Name	Nationality	Time	Notes
1	4	4	Lotte Friis	Denmark	16:00.47	Q
2	3	7	Shao Yiwen	China	16:01.72	Q
3	4	5	Kate Ziegler	United States	16:02.53	Q
4	3	6	Kristel Köbrich	Chile	16:03.50	Q
5	4	7	Wendy Trott	South Africa	16:05.63	Q, AF
6	4	3	Li Xuanxu	China	16:05.82	Q
7	3	4	Melissa Gorman	Australia	16:07.39	Q
8	3	5	Erika Villaécija García	Spain	16:12.45	Q
9	4	6	Chloe Sutton	United States	16:13.20	
10	2	4	Gráinne Murphy	Ireland	16:14.81	
11	3	3	Éva Risztov	Hungary	16:22.60	
12	2	5	Keri-Anne Payne	Great Britain	16:23.11	
13	3	2	Martina Rita Caramignoli	Italy	16:23.75	
14	4	2	Andreina Pinto	Venezuela	16:23.96	
15	2	3	Jessica Ashwood	Australia	16:25.85	
16	4	8	Patricia Castañeda	Mexico	16:26.36	NR
17	2	6	Camelia Potec	Romania	16:29.79	
18	2	8	Julia Hassler	Liechtenstein	16:34.74	NR
19	2	2	Marianna Lymperta	Greece	16:35.16	
20	3	1	Savannah King	Canada	16:35.67	
21	2	7	Nina Dittrich	Austria	16:37.15	
22	2	1	Charetzeni Escobar	Mexico	16:40.09	
23	1	4	Han Na-Kyeong	South Korea	17:06.37	
24	3	8	Maja Cesar	Slovenia	17:22.42	
25	1	5	Yesim Giresunlu	Turkey	17:23.60	
26	1	3	Simona Marinova	North Macedonia	17:44.99	
–	4	1	Cecilia Biagioli	Argentina		DNS

=== Final ===
The final was held at 18:35.

Rank	Lane	Name	Nationality	Time	Notes
1st place, gold medalist(s)	4	Lotte Friis	Denmark	15:49.59	
2nd place, silver medalist(s)	3	Kate Ziegler	United States	15:55.60	
3rd place, bronze medalist(s)	7	Li Xuanxu	China	15:58.02	AS
4	6	Kristel Köbrich	Chile	16:05.11	
5	1	Melissa Gorman	Australia	16:05.98	
6	2	Wendy Trott	South Africa	16:06.02	
7	8	Erika Villaécija García	Spain	16:09.71	
8	5	Shao Yiwen	China	16:12.01	
