= Swimming at the 2009 World Aquatics Championships – Women's 800 metre freestyle =

The heats for the Women's 800 m Freestyle race at the 2009 World Championships took place on the morning of 31 July and the final will take place in the evening session of 1 August at the Foro Italico in Rome, Italy.

== Records ==
Prior to this competition, the existing world and competition records were as follows:

World record	Rebecca Adlington (GBR)	8:14.10	Beijing, China	16 August 2008
Championship record	Kate Ziegler (USA)	8:18.52	Melbourne, Australia	31 March 2007

The following records were established during the competition:

Date	Round	Name	Nationality	Time	Record
1 August	Final	Lotte Friis	Denmark	8:15.92	CR

== Heats ==
Rank	Name	Nationality	Time	Heat	Lane	Notes
1	Rebecca Adlington	Great Britain	8:20.53	5	4	
2	Joanne Jackson	Great Britain	8:20.80	3	4	
3	Camelia Potec	Romania	8:22.03	4	4	
4	Alessia Filippi	Italy	8:24.03	5	5	
5	Lotte Friis	Denmark	8:25.72	4	5	
6	Erika Villaécija García	Spain	8:26.58	5	3	
7	Wendy Trott	South Africa	8:27.26	3	3	
8	Kristel Köbrich	Chile	8:27.90	3	2	SA
8	Ophelie-Cyrielle Etienne	France	8:27.90	4	6	
10	Chloe Sutton	United States	8:29.25	5	6	
11	Coralie Balmy	France	8:31.39	4	3	
12	Eider Santamaria	Spain	8:33.51	4	2	
13	Andreina Pinto	Venezuela	8:34.17	3	6	
14	Ren Junni	China	8:36.14	4	1	
15	Melissa Gorman	Australia	8:36.37	3	7	
16	Jordis Steinegger	Austria	8:36.82	5	8	
17	Patricia Castañeda Miyamoto	Mexico	8:36.98	3	9	NR
18	Blair Evans	Australia	8:38.10	5	2	
19	Elena Sokolova	Russia	8:39.09	3	5	
20	Nuala Murphy	Ireland	8:39.17	4	9	NR
21	Maiko Fujino	Japan	8:40.18	5	1	
22	Gráinne Murphy	Ireland	8:40.23	5	9	
23	Susana Escobar	Mexico	8:41.10	4	8	
24	Lynette Lim	Singapore	8:42.16	2	2	
25	Natsumi Iwashita	Japan	8:44.43	3	1	
26	Swann Oberson	Switzerland	8:44.93	2	4	
27	Yanel Pinto	Venezuela	8:45.45	2	1	
28	Haley Anderson	United States	8:45.91	4	7	
29	Nina Cesar	Slovenia	8:47.51	5	7	
30	Savannah King	Canada	8:48.01	5	0	
31	Iris Matthey	Switzerland	8:49.28	2	5	
32	Yang Chin-Kuei	Chinese Taipei	8:49.70	2	6	
33	Nina Dittrich	Austria	8:51.65	3	0	
34	Erica Cirila Totten	Philippines	8:53.34	2	8	NR
35	Cho Youn Soo	South Korea	8:56.08	2	7	
36	Nika Karlina Petric	Slovenia	8:56.71	3	8	
37	Samantha Arevalo	Ecuador	9:05.74	2	0	
38	Khoo Cai Lin	Malaysia	9:05.77	2	3	
39	Koh Hui Yu	Singapore	9:10.25	1	5	
40	Andrea Cedron	Peru	9:14.90	1	4	
41	Nada Abbas	Egypt	9:15.62	2	9	
42	Ting Sheng-Yo	Chinese Taipei	9:20.80	1	3	
43	Daniela Miyahara Coello	Peru	9:25.02	1	6	
44	Miriam Hatamleh	Jordan	9:39.87	1	2	
45	Nicole Huerta	Dominican Republic	9:53.98	1	7	
46	Ghulam Sakina	Pakistan	10:05.79	1	1	NR
47	Tieri Erasito	Fiji	10:52.89	1	8	
—	Federica Pellegrini	Italy	DNS	1	0	
—	Paula Zukowska	Poland	DNS	1	9	
—	Tanya Hunks	Canada	DNS	4	0	

== Final ==
Rank	Name	Nationality	Time	Lane	Notes
1st place, gold medalist(s)	Lotte Friis	Denmark	8:15.92	2	CR, NR
2nd place, silver medalist(s)	Joanne Jackson	Great Britain	8:16.66	5	
3rd place, bronze medalist(s)	Alessia Filippi	Italy	8:17.21	6	NR
4	Rebecca Adlington	Great Britain	8:17.90	4	
5	Camelia Potec	Romania	8:20.44	3	
6	Erika Villaécija García	Spain	8:25.97	7	
7	Ophélie-Cyrielle Étienne	France	8:26.35	8	
8	Wendy Trott	South Africa	8:29.61	1	
9	Kristel Köbrich	Chile	8:30.10	0	
