= Swimming at the 2009 World Aquatics Championships – Women's 1500 metre freestyle =

The heats for the Women's 1500 m Freestyle race at the 2009 World Championships took place on the morning of 27 July and the final was held in the evening session of 28 July at the Foro Italico in Rome, Italy.

== Records ==
Prior to this competition, the existing world and competition records were as follows:

World record	Kate Ziegler (USA)	15:42.54	Mission Viejo, United States	27 June 2007
Championship record	Kate Ziegler (USA)	15:53.05	Melbourne, Australia	27 March 2007

The following records were established during the competition:

Date	Round	Name	Nationality	Time	Record
28 July	Final	Alessia Filippi	Italy	15:44.93	CR

== Heats ==
Rank	Name	Nationality	Time	Heat	Lane	Notes
1	Lotte Friis	Denmark	15:58.23	2	4	NR
2	Kristel Köbrich	Chile	15:58.75	2	5	SA
3	Camelia Potec	Romania	16:02.21	4	4	
4	Alessia Filippi	Italy	16:04.34	3	4	
5	Erika Villaécija García	Spain	16:04.78	4	5	
6	Wendy Trott	South Africa	16:08.96	3	5	AF
7	Chloe Sutton	United States	16:12.56	2	3	
8	Melissa Gorman	Australia	16:16.83	2	6	
9	Haley Anderson	United States	16:20.62	4	2	
10	Maiko Fujino	Japan	16:21.09	3	3	
11	Eider Santamaria	Spain	16:21.75	4	3	
12	Andreina Pinto	Venezuela	16:22.29	4	7	NR
13	Ren Junni	China	16:27.74	1	3	
14	Patricia Castañeda Miyamoto	Mexico	16:28.03	4	1	NR
15	Gráinne Murphy	Ireland	16:28.47	2	1	NR
16	Susana Escobar	Mexico	16:31.30	3	8	
17	Martina Rita Caramignoli	Italy	16:33.40	3	7	
18	Isabelle Harle	Germany	16:33.79	3	6	
19	Nina Dittrich	Austria	16:34.02	3	2	
20	Ekaterina Seliverstova	Russia	16:36.37	2	2	
21	Natsumi Iwashita	Japan	16:37.22	2	7	
22	Tjasa Oder	Slovenia	16:37.73	4	6	
23	Nuala Murphy	Ireland	16:37.97	2	0	
24	Ionela Cozma	Romania	16:38.48	2	8	
25	Lynette Lim	Singapore	16:41.49	4	9	NR
26	Savannah King	Canada	16:43.25	4	0	
27	Swann Oberson	Switzerland	16:44.08	3	1	
28	Iris Matthey	Switzerland	16:51.99	3	0	
29	Teja Zupan	Slovenia	17:09.79	4	8	
30	Cho Youn Soo	South Korea	17:12.67	3	9	
31	Darneyis Orozco	Venezuela	17:31.44	1	4	
32	Nada Abbas	Egypt	17:39.57	1	5	

== Final ==
Rank	Name	Nationality	Time	Lane	Notes
1st place, gold medalist(s)	Alessia Filippi	Italy	15:44.93	6	ER, CR
2nd place, silver medalist(s)	Lotte Friis	Denmark	15:46.30	4	NR
3rd place, bronze medalist(s)	Camelia Potec	Romania	15:55.63	3	
4	Kristel Köbrich	Chile	15:57.57	5	SA
5	Erika Villaécija García	Spain	16:00.25	2	NR
6	Wendy Trott	South Africa	16:09.22	7	
7	Melissa Gorman	Australia	16:09.66	8	
8	Chloe Sutton	United States	16:16.10	1	

== See also ==
- Swimming at the 2007 World Aquatics Championships – Women's 1500 metre freestyle
