= Swimming at the 2011 World Aquatics Championships – Women's 800 metre freestyle =

Women's 800 metre freestyle at the 2011 World Aquatics Championships
- Dates: July 29, 2011 (heats); July 30, 2011 (final)
- Competitors: 34 from 28 nations
- Winning time: 8:17.51

Medalists
gold medal	Rebecca Adlington	Great Britain
silver medal	Lotte Friis	Denmark
bronze medal	Kate Ziegler	United States

The women's 800 metre freestyle competition of the swimming events at the 2011 World Aquatics Championships was held on July 29 with the heats and July 30 with the final.

== Records ==
Prior to the competition, the existing world and championship records were as follows.

	Name	Nation	Time	Location	Date
World record	Rebecca Adlington	United Kingdom	8:14.10	Beijing	August 16, 2008
Championship record	Lotte Friis	Denmark	8:15.92	Rome	August 1, 2009

== Results ==
=== Heats ===
32 swimmers participated in 5 heats.

Rank	Heat	Lane	Name	Nationality	Time	Notes
1	5	4	Rebecca Adlington	Great Britain	8:22.27	Q
2	5	5	Lotte Friis	Denmark	8:23.07	Q
3	3	5	Chloe Sutton	United States	8:27.72	Q
4	4	4	Kate Ziegler	United States	8:28.28	Q
5	3	4	Katie Goldman	Australia	8:28.35	Q
6	3	7	Boglárka Kapás	Hungary	8:28.40	Q
7	5	1	Lauren Boyle	New Zealand	8:28.50	Q, NR
8	3	6	Wendy Trott	South Africa	8:28.75	Q
9	3	2	Kristel Köbrich	Chile	8:28.76	
10	4	5	Shao Yiwen	China	8:29.05	
11	5	2	Erika Villaécija García	Spain	8:29.13	
12	5	7	Éva Risztov	Hungary	8:29.16	
13	4	7	Melissa Gorman	Australia	8:30.00	
14	4	6	Camelia Potec	Romania	8:32.35	
15	4	1	Andreina Pinto	Venezuela	8:33.62	
16	5	6	Jazmin Carlin	Great Britain	8:34.33	
17	3	3	Gráinne Murphy	Ireland	8:35.17	
18	4	8	Savannah King	Canada	8:41.93	
19	5	3	Chen Qian	China	8:42.15	
20	2	4	Patricia Castañeda	Mexico	8:42.65	
21	3	8	Nina Dittrich	Austria	8:43.89	
22	5	8	Cecilia Biagioli	Argentina	8:44.01	
23	2	5	Spela Bohinc	Slovenia	8:45.86	
24	2	2	Julia Hassler	Liechtenstein	8:46.00	NR
25	3	1	Marianna Lymperta	Greece	8:51.93	
26	2	6	Cai Lin Khoo	Malaysia	8:57.17	
27	2	3	Alexia Benitez	El Salvador	9:00.04	
28	1	6	Samantha Arevalo	Ecuador	9:00.96	
29	1	5	Shahd Osman	Egypt	9:01.84	
30	1	4	Daniela Miyahara	Peru	9:02.28	NR
31	2	7	Benjaporn Sriphanomthorn	Thailand	9:08.40	
32	1	3	Simona Marinova	North Macedonia	9:12.47	
–	4	2	Mireia Belmonte García	Spain		DNS
–	4	3	Federica Pellegrini	Italy		DNS

=== Final ===
The final was held at 19:30.

Rank	Lane	Name	Nationality	Time	Notes
1st place, gold medalist(s)	4	Rebecca Adlington	Great Britain	8:17.51	
2nd place, silver medalist(s)	5	Lotte Friis	Denmark	8:18.20	
3rd place, bronze medalist(s)	6	Kate Ziegler	United States	8:23.36	
4	3	Chloe Sutton	United States	8:24.05	
5	7	Boglárka Kapás	Hungary	8:24.79	NR
6	2	Katie Goldman	Australia	8:29.20	
7	8	Wendy Trott	South Africa	8:30.45	
8	1	Lauren Boyle	New Zealand	8:32.72	
