= 2010 FINA World Swimming Championships (25 m) – Women's 800 metre freestyle =

Women's 800m Freestyle at the 2010 Short Course Worlds
- Dates: 16 December 2010
- Competitors: 28
- Winning time: 8:11.61

Medalists
gold medal	Erika Villaecija	Spain
silver medal	Mireia Belmonte	Spain
bronze medal	Kate Ziegler	United States

The Women's 800 Freestyle at the 10th FINA World Swimming Championships (25m) was swum on 16 December 2010 in Dubai, United Arab Emirates. 28 individuals swam the event, which was a timed-final where the top-8 seeded swimmers swam in the evening and the rest of the field swam in the morning session. All times were then ranked for final placings.

At the start of the event, the existing World (WR) and Championship records (CR) were:

- WR: 8:04.53, (Italy) Alessia Filippi, (Rijeka, 12 December 2008)
- CR: 8:08.25, (United Kingdom) Rebecca Adlington, (Manchester 2008)

== Results ==
Rank	Heat	Lane	Name	Time	Notes
1st place, gold medalist(s)	4	3	Erika Villaécija García (ESP)	8:11.61	
2nd place, silver medalist(s)	4	7	Mireia Belmonte García (ESP)	8:12.48	
3rd place, bronze medalist(s)	4	2	Kate Ziegler (USA)	8:12.84	
4	4	4	Lotte Friis (DEN)	8:14.22	
5	1	3	Chen Qian (CHN)	8:16.11	
6	4	6	Blair Evans (AUS)	8:16.52	
7	3	3	Chloe Sutton (USA)	8:16.54	
8	3	6	Coralie Balmy (FRA)	8:16.73	
9	4	8	Kristel Kobrich (CHI)	8:18.26	
10	1	6	Li Xuanxu (CHN)	8:22.32	
11	3	5	Nina Cesar (SLO)	8:22.42	
12	4	5	Katie Goldman (AUS)	8:23.47	
13	3	1	Andreina Pinto (VEN)	8:26.31	
14	3	2	Maiko Fujino (JPN)	8:29.65	
15	3	4	Tjasa Oder (SLO)	8:29.75	
16	1	2	Alice Nesti (ITA)	8:34.33	
17	3	7	Cecilia Biagioli (ARG)	8:38.06	
18	2	5	Ting Sheng-Yo (TPE)	8:38.63	
19	3	8	Julia Hassler (LIE)	8:42.63	
20	2	3	Samantha Arévalo (ECU)	8:44.37	
21	2	2	Simona Marinova (MKD)	8:44.52	
22	2	4	Elin Sofia Slaatmo (NOR)	8:45.73	
23	2	6	Alexia Pamela Benitez Quijada (ESA)	8:46.20	
24	2	7	Daniela Kaori Miyahara (PER)	8:51.99	
25	1	4	Malia Mghezzi Bekhouche (ALG)	9:01.27	
26	2	1	Andrea Cedrón (PER)	9:02.93	
27	2	8	Victoria Isabelle Ho (JAM)	9:14.45	
28	1	5	Elodie Poo Cheong (MRI)	9:52.19	
