= 2010 Pan Pacific Swimming Championships – Women's 800 metre freestyle =

Women's 800 metre freestyle at the 2010 Pan Pacific Swimming Championships
- Venue: William Woollett Jr. Aquatics Center
- Dates: August 18, 2010 (heats & finals)
- Competitors: 20 from 7 nations
- Winning time: 8:21.59

Medalists
gold medal	Kate Ziegler	United States
silver medal	Chloe Sutton	United States
bronze medal	Katie Goldman	Australia

The women's 800 metre freestyle competition at the 2010 Pan Pacific Swimming Championships took place on August 18 at the William Woollett Jr. Aquatics Center. The last champion was Kate Ziegler of US.

This event was a timed-final where each swimmer swam just once. The top 8 seeded swimmers swam in the evening, and the remaining swimmers swam in the morning session.

== Records ==
Prior to this competition, the existing world and Pan Pacific records were as follows:

World record	Rebecca Adlington (GBR)	8:14.10	Beijing, China	August 16, 2008
Pan Pacific Championships record	Janet Evans (USA)	8:16.22	Tokyo, Japan	August 20, 1989

== Results ==
All times are in minutes and seconds.

KEY:	q	Fastest non-qualifiers	Q	Qualified	CR	Championships record	NR	National record	PB	Personal best	SB	Seasonal best

The first round was held on August 18, at 11:50, and the final was held on August 18, at 18:00.

Rank	Heat	Lane	Name	Nationality	Time	Notes
1st place, gold medalist(s)	3	6	Kate Ziegler	United States	8:21.59	
2nd place, silver medalist(s)	3	5	Chloe Sutton	United States	8:24.51	
3rd place, bronze medalist(s)	3	4	Katie Goldman	Australia	8:26.38	
4	1	6	Melissa Gorman	Australia	8:30.45	
5	3	2	Kristel Kobrich	Chile	8:31.95	
6	3	7	Maiko Fujino	Japan	8:33.84	
7	3	3	Blair Evans	Australia	8:34.80	
8	1	3	Haley Anderson	United States	8:35.33	
9	1	1	Lauren Boyle	New Zealand	8:36.65	
10	3	1	Yumi Kida	Japan	8:37.57	
11	1	7	Chika Yonenaga	Japan	8:40.29	
12	1	5	Emily Brunemann	United States	8:40.95	
13	1	4	Kylie Palmer	Australia	8:45.85	
14	1	8	Cara Baker	New Zealand	8:46.63	
15	2	5	Miho Takahashi	Japan	8:49.87	
16	3	8	Savannah King	Canada	8:50.57	
17	1	2	Lindsay Seemann	Canada	8:50.75	
18	2	3	Nadine Williams	Canada	8:51.46	
19	2	4	Zsofia Balazs	Canada	8:54.28	
20	2	6	Sarah Correa	Brazil	9:10.50	
