= 800 metres freestyle =

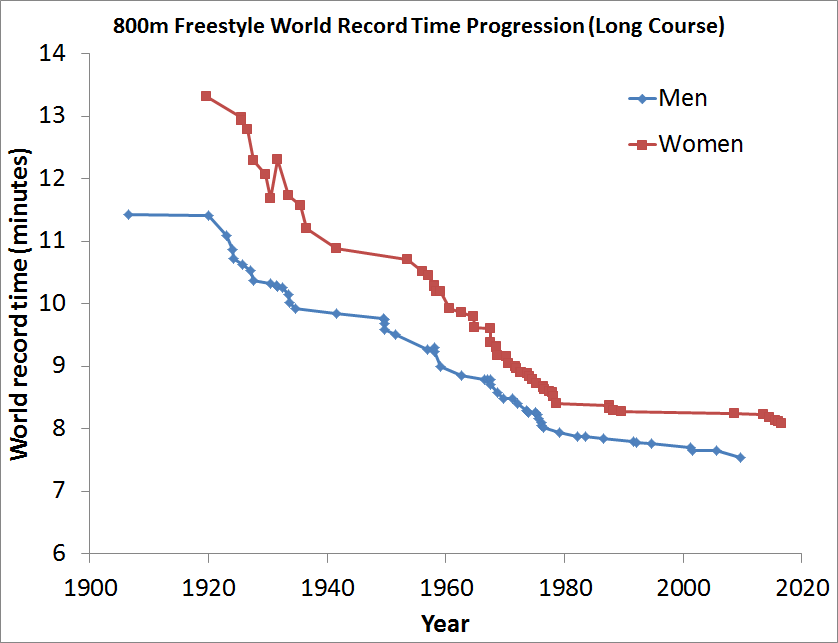
World record progression for the 800m freestyle

The 800 metres freestyle is an event in competitive swimming. World records are ratified by World Aquatics (formerly FINA). The current long course world record holders are China's Zhang Lin and the US' Katie Ledecky, while the current short course world record holders are Ireland's Daniel Wiffen and Australia's Lani Pallister.

The men's event was first contested at the Olympic Games in 2020, while the women's event was introduced in 1968; the current Olympic champions are Wiffen and Ledecky. The men's event has been contested at the World Aquatics Championships since 2001, while the women's event has been contested since the inaugural championships in 1973; the current world champions (long course) are Tunisia's Ahmed Jaouadi, and Ledecky. The men's event has been contested at the World Aquatics Swimming Championships (25m) since 2022, while the women's event has been contested since the inaugural championships in 1993; the current world champions (short course) are Hungary's Zalán Sárkány, and Pallister.

== World record progression ==
=== Men long course ===
#	Time		Name	Nationality	Date	Meet	Location	Ref
1	11:25.4	yd	Henry Taylor	Great Britain	Jul 21, 1906	-	Runcorn, United Kingdom	
2	11:24.2	yd	Norman Ross	United States	Jan 10, 1920	-	Sydney, Australia	
3	11:05.2	yd	Boy Charlton	Australia	Jan 13, 1923	-	Sydney, Australia	
4	10:51.8	yd	Boy Charlton	Australia	Jan 19, 1924	-	Sydney, Australia	
5	10:43.6		Arne Borg	Sweden	Apr 11, 1924	-	Honolulu, Hawaii	
6	10:37.4		Arne Borg	Sweden	Aug 25, 1925	-	Harnäs, Sweden	
7	10:32.0	yd	Boy Charlton	Australia	Jan 8, 1927	-	Sydney, Australia	
8	10:22.2	yd	Johnny Weissmuller	United States	Jul 27, 1927	-	Honolulu, Hawaii	
9	10:19.6		Jean Taris	France	May 30, 1930	-	Paris, France	
10	10:17.2		Jean Taris	France	Jun 9, 1931	-	Cannes, France	
11	10:16.6		Shozo Makino	Japan	Aug 30, 1931	-	Osaka, Japan	
12	10:15.6		Jean Taris	France	Jun 21, 1932	-	Cannes, France	
13	10:08.6		Shozo Makino	Japan	Jun 25, 1933	-	Tokyo, Japan	
14	10:01.2		Shozo Makino	Japan	Sep 16, 1933	-	Tokyo, Japan	
15	9:55.8		Shozo Makino	Japan	Sep 15, 1934	-	Tokyo, Japan	
16	9:50.9		Bill Smith	United States	Jul 24, 1941	-	Honolulu, Hawaii	
17	9:45.6		Hironoshin Furuhashi	Japan	Jun 26, 1949	-	Tokyo, Japan	
18	9:45.0		Shiro Hashizume	Japan	Aug 16, 1949	-	Los Angeles, United States	
19	9:40.7		Hironoshin Furuhashi	Japan	Aug 16, 1949	-	Los Angeles, United States	
20	9:35.5		Hironoshin Furuhashi	Japan	Aug 16, 1949	-	Los Angeles, United States	
21	9:30.7		Ford Konno	United States	Jul 7, 1951	-	Honolulu, Hawaii	
22	9:15.7		George Breen	United States	Oct 27, 1956	-	New Haven, United States	
23	9:17.7	yd	John Konrads	Australia	Jan 11, 1958	-	Sydney, Australia	
24	9:14.5	yd	John Konrads	Australia	Feb 22, 1958	-	Melbourne, Australia	
25	8:59.6	yd	John Konrads	Australia	Jan 10, 1959	-	Sydney, Australia	
26	8:51.5		Murray Rose	Australia	Aug 26, 1962	-	Los Altos, United States	
27	8:47.4		Semyon Belits-Geiman	Soviet Union	Aug 3, 1966	-	Kharkiv, Soviet Union	
28	8:47.3		John Bennett	Australia	Jan 16, 1967	-	Sydney, Australia	
29	8:46.8		Alain Mosconi	France	Jul 5, 1967	-	Monaco, Monaco	
30	8:42.0		Francis Luyce	France	Jul 21, 1967	-	Dinard, France	
31	8:34.3	†	Mike Burton	United States	Sep 3, 1968	USA Olympic Trials	Long Beach, United States	
32	8:28.8	†	Mike Burton	United States	Aug 17, 1969	AAU Nationals	Louisville, United States	
33	8:28.6		Graham Windeatt	Australia	Apr 3, 1971	NSW Combined High Schools Championships	Sydney, Australia	
34	8:23.8		Brad Cooper	Australia	Jan 12, 1972	NSW State Championships	Sydney, Australia	
35	8:17.60	†	Stephen Holland	Australia	Aug 5, 1973	Pre World Championship meet	Brisbane, Australia	
36	8:16.27	†	Stephen Holland	Australia	Sep 8, 1973	World Championships	Belgrade, Yugoslavia	
37	8:15.88	†	Stephen Holland	Australia	Jan 1, 1974	Commonwealth Games	Christchurch, New Zealand	
38	8:15.2		Stephen Holland	Australia	Jan 17, 1975	QLD State Championships	Brisbane, Australia	
39	8:15.02	†	Stephen Holland	Australia	Jan 25, 1975	New Zealand Games	Christchurch, New Zealand	
40	8:13.68	†	Tim Shaw	United States	Jun 21, 1975	USA World Championship Trials	Long Beach, United States	
41	8:09.60		Tim Shaw	United States	Jul 13, 1975	Pre World Championship meet	Mission Viejo, United States	
42	8:06.27	†	Stephen Holland	Australia	Feb 27, 1976	Australian Olympic Trials	Sydney, Australia	
43	8:02.91		Stephen Holland	Australia	Feb 29, 1976	Australian Olympic Trials	Sydney, Australia	
44	8:01.54	†	Bobby Hackett	United States	Jun 21, 1976	USA Olympic Trials	Long Beach, United States	
45	7:56.49	†	Vladimir Salnikov	Soviet Union	Mar 23, 1979	URS vs. GDR Duel	Minsk, Soviet Union	
46	7:52.83		Vladimir Salnikov	Soviet Union	Feb 14, 1982	URS Winter Nationals	Moscow, Soviet Union	
47	7:52.23		Vladimir Salnikov	Soviet Union	Jul 14, 1983	Los Angeles International	Los Angeles, United States	
48	7:50.64		Vladimir Salnikov	Soviet Union	Jul 4, 1986	Goodwill Games	Moscow, Soviet Union	
49	7:47.85	†	Kieren Perkins	Australia	Aug 25, 1991	Pan Pacific Championships	Edmonton, Canada	
50	7:46.60		Kieren Perkins	Australia	Feb 16, 1992	NSW Age Group Championships	Sydney, Australia	
51	7:46.00	†	Kieren Perkins	Australia	August 24, 1994	Commonwealth Games	Victoria, Canada	
52	7:41.59		Ian Thorpe	Australia	26 March 2001	Australian Championships	Hobart, Australia	link link
53	7:39.16		Ian Thorpe	Australia	24 July 2001	World Championships	Fukuoka, Japan	
54	7:38.65		Grant Hackett	Australia	27 July 2005	World Championships	Montreal, Canada	
55	7:32.12		Zhang Lin	China	29 July 2009	World Championships	Rome, Italy	

Legend: # – Record awaiting ratification by FINA; yd – set in a pool measured in yards; e – equalled existing record;
Records not set in finals: h – heat; sf – semifinal; r – relay 1st leg; rh – relay heat 1st leg; b – B final; † – en route to final mark; so – swim-off; tt – time trial

=== Men short course ===
#	Time	Name	Nationality	Date	Meet	Location	Ref
WB	7:38.90	Vladimir Salnikov	Soviet Union	Feb 13, 1983	Festival Arena	Bonn, Germany	
1	7:38.75	Michael Gross	Germany	Feb 3, 1985	Festival Arena	Bonn, Germany	
2	7:34.90	Kieren Perkins	Australia	Jul 25, 1993	Grand Prix	Sydney, Australia	
3	7:25.28	Grant Hackett	Australia	Aug 3, 2001	Australian Championships	Perth, Australia	
4	7:23.42	Grant Hackett	Australia	Jul 20, 2008	Victorian Championships	Melbourne, Australia	
5	7:20.46	Daniel Wiffen	Ireland	Dec 10, 2023	European Championships	Otopeni, Romania	

Legend: # – Record awaiting ratification by World Aquatics; yd – set in a pool measured in yards; e – equalled existing record;
Records not set in finals: h – heat; sf – semifinal; r – relay 1st leg; rh – relay heat 1st leg; b – B final; † – en route to final mark; so – swim-off; tt – time trial

=== Women long course ===
#	Time		Name	Nationality	Date	Meet	Location	Ref
1	13:19.0	yd	Gertrude Ederle	United States	17 August 1919	-	Indianapolis, United States	
2	12:58.2	yd	Ethel McGary	United States	17 August 1919	-	Detroit, United States	
3	12:56.0	yd	Ethel McGary	United States	15 August 1925	-	Indianapolis, United States	
4	12:47.2	yd	Martha Norelius	United States	7 August 1926	-	Philadelphia, United States	
5	12:17.8	yd	Martha Norelius	United States	31 July 1927	-	Massapequa, United States	
6	12:03.8	yd	Josephine McKim	United States	10 August 1929	-	Honolulu, Hawaii	
7	11:41.2	yd	Helene Madison	United States	6 July 1930	-	Long Beach, United States	
8	12:18.8		Yvonne Godard	France	23 July 1931	-	Paris, France	
9	11:44.0	yd	Lenore Kight	United States	23 July 1933	-	Jones Beach, United States	
10	11:34.4	yd	Lenore Kight	United States	21 July 1935	-	Manhattan Beach, United States	
11	11:11.7		Ragnhild Hveger	Denmark	3 July 1936	-	Copenhagen, Denmark	
12	10:52.5		Ragnhild Hveger	Denmark	13 August 1941	-	Copenhagen, Denmark	
13	10:42.4		Valéria Gyenge	Hungary	28 June 1953	-	Budapest, Hungary	
14	10:30.9		Lorraine Crapp	Australia	14 January 1956	-	Sydney, Australia	
15	10:27.3		Mary Kok	Netherlands	16 February 1957	-	Durban, South Africa	
16	10:17.7	yd	Ilsa Konrads	Australia	9 January 1958	-	Sydney, Australia	
17	10:16.2	yd	Ilsa Konrads	Australia	20 February 1958	-	Melbourne, Australia	
18	10:11.8	yd	Ilsa Konrads	Australia	13 June 1958	-	Townsville, Australia	
19	10:11.4	yd	Ilsa Konrads	Australia	19 February 1959	-	Hobart, Australia	
20	9:55.6		Jane Cederqvist	Sweden	17 August 1960	-	Uppsala, Sweden	
21	9:51.6		Carolyn House	United States	26 August 1962	-	Los Altos, United States	
22	9:47.3		Patty Caretto	United States	30 July 1964	-	Los Altos, United States	
23	9:36.9		Sharon Finneran	United States	28 September 1964	-	Los Angeles, United States	
24	9:35.8	†	Debbie Meyer	United States	9 July 1967	Santa Clara Invitational	Santa Clara, United States	
25	9:22.9		Debbie Meyer	United States	29 July 1967	Pan American Games	Winnipeg, Canada	
26	9:19.0	†	Debbie Meyer	United States	21 July 1968	-	Los Angeles, United States	
27	9:17.8		Debbie Meyer	United States	4 August 1968	US National Championships	Lincoln, Nebraska, United States	
28	9:10.4		Debbie Meyer	United States	28 August 1968	US Olympic Trials	Los Angeles, United States	
29	9:09.1		Karen Moras	Australia	1 March 1970	Australian Championships	Sydney, Australia	
30	9:02.45		Karen Moras	Australia	18 July 1970	Commonwealth Games	Edinburgh, United Kingdom	
31	8:59.4		Ann Simmons	United States	10 September 1971	USA vs USSR vs Great Britain Dual Meet	Minsk, Soviet Union	
32	8:58.1		Shane Gould	Australia	3 December 1971	-	Sydney, Australia	
33	8:53.83		Jo Harshbarger	United States	6 August 1972	US Olympic Trials	Chicago, Illinois, United States	
34	8:53.68		Keena Rothhammer	United States	3 September 1972	Olympic Games	Munich, West Germany	
35	8:52.97		Novella Calligaris	Italy	9 September 1973	World Championships	Belgrade, Yugoslavia	
36	8:50.10		Jennifer Turrall	Australia	5 January 1974	NSW Championships	Sydney, Australia	
37	8:47.66	†	Jo Harshbarger	United States	25 August 1974	US National Championships	Concord, United States	
38	8:47.59		Jo Harshbarger	United States	31 August 1974	USA vs East Germany Dual Meet	Concord, United States	
39	8:43.48		Jennifer Turrall	Australia	31 March 1975	Coca-Cola International	London, United Kingdom	
40	8:40.68		Petra Thümer	East Germany	4 June 1976	East German Championships	East Berlin, East Germany	
41	8:39.63		Shirley Babashoff	United States	21 June 1976	USA Olympic Trials	Long Beach, United States	
42	8:37.14		Petra Thümer	East Germany	25 July 1976	Olympic Games	Montreal, Canada	
43	8:35.04		Petra Thümer	East Germany	9 July 1977	East German Championships	Leipzig, East Germany	
44	8:34.86		Michelle Ford	Australia	6 January 1978	KBI meet	Brisbane, Australia	
45	8:31.30		Michelle Ford	Australia	21 January 1978	NSW Championships	Sydney, Australia	
46	8:30.53		Tracey Wickham	Australia	21 February 1978	Australian Championships	Brisbane, Australia	
47	8:24.62		Tracey Wickham	Australia	5 August 1978	Commonwealth Games	Edmonton, Canada	
48	8:22.44		Janet Evans	United States	27 July 1987	US National Championships	Clovis, United States	
49	8:19.53		Anke Möhring	East Germany	19 August 1987	European Championships	Strasbourg, France	
50	8:17.12		Janet Evans	United States	22 March 1988	US Spring National Championships	Orlando, United States	
51	8:16.22		Janet Evans	United States	20 August 1989	Pan Pacific Championships	Tokyo, Japan	
52	8:14.10		Rebecca Adlington	Great Britain	16 August 2008	Olympic Games	Beijing, China	
53	8:13.86		Katie Ledecky	United States	3 August 2013	World Championships	Barcelona, Spain	
54	8:11.00		Katie Ledecky	United States	22 June 2014	Woodlands Senior Invitational	Shenandoah, United States	
55	8:07.39		Katie Ledecky	United States	8 August 2015	World Championships	Kazan, Russia	
56	8:06.68		Katie Ledecky	United States	17 January 2016	Arena Pro Swim Series	Austin, United States	
57	8:04.79		Katie Ledecky	United States	12 August 2016	Olympic Games	Rio de Janeiro, Brazil	
58	8:04.12		Katie Ledecky	United States	3 May 2025	TYR Pro Swim Series	Fort Lauderdale, United States	

Legend: # – Record awaiting ratification by World Aquatics; yd – set in a pool measured in yards; e – equalled existing record;
Records not set in finals: h – heat; sf – semifinal; r – relay 1st leg; rh – relay heat 1st leg; b – B final; † – en route to final mark; so – swim-off; tt – time trial

=== Women short course ===
#	Time	Name	Nationality	Date	Meet	Location	Ref
WB	8:15.34	Astrid Strauss	East Germany	7 February 1987	Bonn Arena Festival	Bonn, Germany	
1	8:15.15	Chen Hua	China	2 December 2001	World Cup	Shanghai, China	
2	8:14.35	Sachiko Yamada	Japan	4 February 2002	Japanese Championships	Tokyo, Japan	
3	8:11.25	Laure Manaudou	France	9 December 2005	European Championships	Trieste, Italy	
4	8:09.68	Kate Ziegler	United States	12 October 2007	Alex Athletics Jubiläums Challenge	Essen, Germany	
5	8:08.00	Kate Ziegler	United States	14 October 2007	Alex Athletics Jubiläums Challenge	Essen, Germany	
6	8:04.53	Alessia Filippi	Italy	12 December 2008	European Championships	Rijeka, Croatia	
7	8:01.06	Camille Muffat	France	16 November 2012	French Championships	Angers, France	
8	7:59.34	Mireia Belmonte	Spain	10 August 2013	World Cup	Berlin, Germany	
9	7:57.42	Katie Ledecky	United States	5 November 2022	World Cup	Indianapolis, United States	
10	7:54.00	Lani Pallister	Australia	25 October 2025	World Cup	Toronto, Canada	

Legend: # – Record awaiting ratification by World Aquatics; yd – set in a pool measured in yards; e – equalled existing record;
Records not set in finals: h – heat; sf – semifinal; r – relay 1st leg; rh – relay heat 1st leg; b – B final; † – en route to final mark; so – swim-off; tt – time trial

== All-time top 25 ==
Tables show data for two definitions of "Top 25" - the top 25 800 m freestyle times and the top 25 athletes:
- denotes top performance for athletes in the top 25 800 m freestyle times
- denotes lesser performances, still in the top 25 800 m freestyle times, by repeat athletes
- denotes top performance (only) for other top 25 athletes who fall outside the top 25 800 m freestyle times

=== Men long course ===
- Correct as of September 2026

Ath.#	Perf.#	Time	Athlete	Nation	Date	Place	Ref.
1	1	7:32.12	Zhang Lin	China	29 July 2009	Rome	
2	2	7:35.27	Oussama Mellouli	Tunisia	29 July 2009	Rome	
3	3	7:36.73	Samuel Short	Australia	10 June 2026	Sydney	
4	4	7:36.88	Ahmed Jaouadi	Tunisia	30 July 2025	Singapore	
5	5	7:37.00	Ahmed Hafnaoui	Tunisia	26 July 2023	Fukuoka	
	6	7:37.02	Short #2		12 August 2026	Irvine	
6	7	7:37.59	Johannes Liebmann	Germany	12 August 2026	Paris	
	8	7:37.76	Short #3		26 July 2023	Fukuoka	
	9	7:37.94	Liebmann #2		12 April 2026	Stockholm	
7	10	7:38.12	Sven Schwarz	Germany	2 May 2025	Berlin	
8	11	7:38.19	Daniel Wiffen	Ireland	30 July 2024	Paris	
9	12	7:38.57	Sun Yang	China	27 July 2011	Shanghai	
10	13	7:38.65	Grant Hackett	Australia	27 July 2005	Montreal	
11	14	7:38.67	Bobby Finke	United States	26 July 2023	Fukuoka	
	15	7:38.75	Finke #2		30 July 2024	Paris	
	16	7:38.98	Schwarz #2		28 June 2025	Šamorín	
12	17	7:39.10	Lukas Märtens	Germany	15 April 2025	Stockholm	
13	18	7:39.16	Ian Thorpe	Australia	24 July 2001	Fukuoka	
	19	7:39.19	Wiffen #2		26 July 2023	Fukuoka	
14	20	7:39.27	Gregorio Paltrinieri	Italy	24 July 2019	Gwangju	
	21	7:39.36	Finke #3		21 June 2022	Budapest	
	22	7:39.38	Paltrinieri #2		30 July 2024	Paris	
	23	7:39.48	Märtens #2		26 July 2023	Fukuoka	
15	24	7:39.63	Florian Wellbrock	Germany	21 June 2022	Budapest	
	25	7:39.81	Short #4		27 July 2026	Glasgow	
16		7:40.08	Mykhailo Romanchuk	Ukraine	21 June 2022	Budapest	
17		7:40.77	Gabriele Detti	Italy	26 July 2017	Budapest	
18		7:41.28	Henrik Christiansen	Norway	24 July 2019	Gwangju	
19		7:41.73	Wojciech Wojdak	Poland	26 July 2017	Budapest	
20		7:41.75	Zalán Sárkány	Hungary	12 August 2026	Paris	
21		7:41.86	Ryan Cochrane	Canada	27 July 2011	Shanghai	
22		7:42.08	David Aubry	France	24 July 2019	Gwangju	
23		7:42.47	Aleksandr Stepanov	Russia	18 April 2023	Kazan	
24		7:42.49	Zhang Zhanshuo	China	24 September 2026	Tokyo	
25		7:42.51	Jack McLoughlin	Australia	14 June 2021	Adelaide	

=== Men short course ===
- Correct as of September 2026

Ath.#	Perf.#	Time	Athlete	Nation	Date	Place	Ref.
1	1	7:20.46	Daniel Wiffen	Ireland	10 December 2023	Otopeni	
2	2	7:23.42	Grant Hackett	Australia	20 July 2008	Melbourne	
	3	7:25.28	Hackett #2		3 August 2001	Perth	
3	4	7:25.55	Samuel Short	Australia	29 September 2026	Sydney	
4	5	7:25.73	Mykhailo Romanchuk	Ukraine	21 November 2020	Budapest	
5	6	7:25.78	Henrik Christiansen	Norway	21 November 2020	Budapest	
	7	7:25.96	Wiffen #2		15 December 2022	Dublin	
6	8	7:26.84	Zalán Sárkány	Hungary	6 December 2025	Lublin	
	9	7:27.81	Hackett #3		29 August 2007	Melbourne	
7	10	7:27.94	Gregorio Paltrinieri	Italy	7 November 2021	Kazan	
8	11	7:27.99	Florian Wellbrock	Germany	7 November 2021	Kazan	
9	12	7:28.03	Lucas Henveaux	Belgium	6 December 2025	Lublin	
10	13	7:28.61	Zhang Zhanshuo	China	27 October 2026	Beijing	
11	14	7:29.17	Yannick Agnel	France	16 November 2012	Angers	
	15	7:29.39	Christiansen #2		20 December 2019	Tilburg	
	16	7:29.50	Sarkany #2		18 October 2025	Westmont	
	17	7:29.99	Paltrinieri #2		17 December 2022	Melbourne	
	18	7:30.14	Wiffen #3		6 December 2025	Lublin	
	19	7:30.31	Paltrinieri #3		16 December 2018	Hangzhou	
12	20	7:30.32	David Aubry	France	10 December 2023	Otopeni	
13	21	7:30.41	David Johnston	United States	24 August 2022	Sydney	
14	22	7:30.47	Johannes Liebmann	Germany	6 December 2025	Lublin	
	23	7:30.56	Sarkany #3		14 December 2024	Budapest	
	24	7:30.76	Henveaux #2		17 October 2026	Astana	
	25	7:30.79	Christiansen #3		21 December 2019	Tilburg	
15		7:31.18	Federico Colbertaldo	Italy	19 December 2009	Manchester	
16		7:31.38	Victor Johansson	Sweden	6 December 2025	Lublin	
17		7:31.89	Felix Auböck	Austria	21 November 2020	Budapest	
18		7:31.93	Ahmed Jaouadi	Tunisia	14 December 2024	Budapest	
19		7:31.94	Sven Schwarz	Germany	14 November 2026	Wuppertal	
20		7:32.36	Savely Luzin	Russia	11 November 2025	Kazan	
21		7:32.76	Kaito Tabuchi	Japan	10 October 2026	Saga	
22		7:32.77	Alexander Nørgaard	Denmark	18 December 2020	Helsingør	
23		7:33.12	Logan Fontaine	France	17 December 2022	Melbourne	
24		7:33.23	Jan Micka	Czech Republic	16 November 2018	Plzeň	
25		7:33.44	Florian Vogel	Germany	21 November 2015	Wuppertal	

=== Women long course ===
- Correct as of August 2026

Ath.#	Perf.#	Time	Athlete	Nation	Date	Place	Ref.
1	1	8:04.12	Katie Ledecky	United States	3 May 2025	Fort Lauderdale	
	2	8:04.79	Ledecky #2		12 August 2016	Rio de Janeiro	
2	3	8:05.07	Summer McIntosh	Canada	8 June 2025	Victoria	
	4	8:05.62	Ledecky #3		2 August 2025	Singapore	
	5	8:05.76	Ledecky #4		3 June 2025	Indianapolis	
3	6	8:05.98	Lani Pallister	Australia	2 August 2025	Singapore	
	7	8:06.10	Pallister #2		15 August 2026	Irvine	
	8	8:06.68	Ledecky #5		17 January 2016	Austin	
	9	8:07.07	Ledecky #6		27 June 2023	Indianapolis	
	10	8:07.26	Ledecky #7		15 August 2026	Irvine	
	11	8:07.27	Ledecky #8		19 May 2018	Indianapolis	
	12	8:07.29	McIntosh #2		2 August 2025	Singapore	
	13	8:07.39	Ledecky #9		8 August 2015	Kazan	
	14	8:08.04	Ledecky #10		24 June 2022	Budapest	
	15	8:08.57	Ledecky #11		4 March 2026	Westmont	
	16	8:08.87	Ledecky #12		29 July 2023	Fukuoka	
	17	8:09.13	Ledecky #13		9 August 2018	Tokyo	
	18	8:09.27	Ledecky #14		26 April 2022	Greensboro	
	19	8:09.85	Ledecky #15		29 July 2025	Singapore	
	20	8:09.86	McIntosh #3		13 February 2025	Plantation	
	21	8:10.16	Ledecky #16		17 January 2026	Austin	
	22	8:10.32	Ledecky #17		2 July 2016	Omaha	
	23	8:10.45	McIntosh #4		4 March 2026	Westmont	
	24	8:10.70	Ledecky #18		19 May 2019	Bloomington	
	25	8:10.84	Pallister #3		12 June 2025	Adelaide	
4		8:12.29	Ariarne Titmus	Australia	3 August 2024	Paris	
5		8:12.81	Simona Quadarella	Italy	2 August 2025	Singapore	
6		8:13.00	Paige Madden	United States	3 August 2024	Paris	
7		8:13.31	Li Bingjie	China	29 July 2023	Fukuoka	
8		8:14.10	Rebecca Adlington	Great Britain	16 August 2008	Beijing	
9		8:14.64	Wang Jianjiahe	China	30 March 2019	Qingdao	
10		8:15.54	Jazmin Carlin	Great Britain	21 August 2014	Berlin	
11		8:15.92	Lotte Friis	Denmark	1 August 2009	Rome	
12		8:16.22	Janet Evans	United States	20 August 1989	Tokyo	
13		8:16.33	Leah Smith	United States	10 April 2019	Richmond	
14		8:16.37	Boglárka Kapás	Hungary	12 August 2016	Rio de Janeiro	
15		8:16.43	Sarah Köhler	Germany	27 July 2019	Gwangju	
16		8:16.66	Joanne Jackson	Great Britain	1 August 2009	Rome	
17		8:16.70	Camelia Potec	Romania	22 April 2009	Montpellier	
18		8:16.79	Kiah Melverton	Australia	2 August 2022	Birmingham	
19		8:17.05	Katie Grimes	United States	29 July 2021	Tokyo	
20		8:17.21	Alessia Filippi	Italy	1 August 2009	Rome	
21		8:17.53	Isabel Gose	Germany	17 February 2024	Doha	
22		8:17.65	Lauren Boyle	New Zealand	8 August 2015	Kazan	
23		8:18.00	Erika Fairweather	New Zealand	5 April 2023	Auckland	
24		8:18.14	Jessica Ashwood	Australia	5 June 2016	Santa Clara	
25		8:18.52	Kate Ziegler	United States	31 March 2007	Melbourne	

=== Women short course ===
- Correct as of October 2026

Ath.#	Perf.#	Time	Athlete	Nation	Date	Place	Ref.
1	1	7:54.00	Lani Pallister	Australia	25 October 2025	Toronto	
2	2	7:57.42	Katie Ledecky	United States	5 November 2022	Indianapolis	
3	3	7:59.34	Mireia Belmonte	Spain	10 August 2013	Berlin	
4	4	7:59.44	Wang Jianjiahe	China	6 October 2018	Budapest	
	5	8:00.58	Ledecky #2		29 October 2022	Toronto	
5	6	8:01.06	Camille Muffat	France	16 November 2012	Angers	
6	7	8:01.22	Lauren Boyle	New Zealand	7 August 2013	Eindhoven	
	8	8:01.43	Belmonte #2		7 August 2013	Eindhoven	
	9	8:01.66	Pallister #2		2 October 2026	Sydney	
7	10	8:01.90	Isabel Gose	Germany	5 December 2025	Lublin	
	11	8:01.95	Pallister #3		11 December 2024	Budapest	
	12	8:02.02	Pallister #4		12 October 2025	Carmel	
8	13	8:02.09	Li Bingjie	China	29 October 2022	Beijing	
	14	8:02.53	Boyle #2		10 August 2013	Berlin	
	15	8:02.90	Li #2		18 December 2021	Abu Dhabi	
9	16	8:03.00	Simona Quadarella	Italy	5 December 2025	Lublin	
	17	8:03.17	Pallister #5		19 October 2025	Westmont	
	18	8:03.41	Belmonte #3		4 December 2014	Doha	
	19	8:03.86	Wang #2		30 September 2018	Eindhoven	
	20	8:04.07	Pallister #6		14 December 2022	Melbourne	
	21	8:04.35	Wang #3		13 December 2018	Hangzhou	
10	22	8:04.53	Alessia Filippi	Italy	12 December 2008	Rijeka	
11	23	8:04.61	Lotte Friis	Denmark	14 November 2009	Berlin	
12	24	8:04.65	Anastasiya Kirpichnikova	Russia	3 November 2021	Kazan	
	25	8:04.77	Friis #2		16 December 2011	Atlanta	
13		8:05.32	Coralie Balmy	France	12 December 2008	Rijeka	
14		8:05.90	Katie Grimes	United States	11 December 2024	Budapest	
15		8:07.12	Summer McIntosh	Canada	5 November 2022	Indianapolis	
16		8:07.22	Paige Madden	United States	11 December 2024	Budapest	
17		8:07.67	Leah Smith	United States	7 December 2016	Windsor	
18		8:08.00	Kate Ziegler	United States	14 October 2007	Essen	
19		8:08.02	Kristel Köbrich	Chile	14 November 2009	Berlin	
19		8:08.02	Sarah Köhler	Germany	14 November 2019	Berlin	
21		8:08.16	Jazmin Carlin	Great Britain	4 December 2014	Doha	
22		8:08.17	Sharon van Rouwendaal	Netherlands	4 December 2014	Doha	
23		8:08.25	Rebecca Adlington	Great Britain	10 April 2008	Manchester	
24		8:08.41	Katinka Hosszú	Hungary	24 October 2014	Beijing	
25		8:09.69	Erika Fairweather	New Zealand	25 October 2025	Toronto	

== Olympic champions ==
=== Men ===
Edition	Winner	Time	Notes	Ref.
(Japan) Tokyo 2020	Bobby Finke (USA)	7:41.87	(Note: Mykhailo Romanchuk set an Olympic record of 7:41.28 in the heats.)	
(France) Paris 2024	Daniel Wiffen (IRL)	7:38.19	OR	

=== Women ===
Edition	Winner	Time	Notes	Ref.
Mexico City 1968	Debbie Meyer (USA)	9:24.0	OR	
(West Germany) Munich 1972	Keena Rothhammer (USA)	8:53.68	WR	
(Canada) Montreal 1976	Petra Thümer (GDR)	8:37.14	WR	
(Soviet Union) Moscow 1980	Michelle Ford (AUS)	8:28.90	OR	
(United States) Los Angeles 1984	Tiffany Cohen (USA)	8:24.96	OR	
(South Korea) Seoul 1988	Janet Evans (USA)	8:20.20	OR	
(Spain) Barcelona 1992	Janet Evans (USA)	8:25.52		
(United States) Atlanta 1996	Brooke Bennett (USA)	8:27.89		
(Australia) Sydney 2000	Brooke Bennett (USA)	8:19.67	OR	
(Greece) Athens 2004	Ai Shibata (JPN)	8:24.54		
(China) Beijing 2008	Rebecca Adlington (GBR)	8:14.10	WR	
(United Kingdom) London 2012	Katie Ledecky (USA)	8:14.63		
(Brazil) Rio de Janeiro 2016	Katie Ledecky (USA)	8:04.79	WR	
(Japan) Tokyo 2020	Katie Ledecky (USA)	8:12.57		
(France) Paris 2024	Katie Ledecky (USA)	8:11.04		

== World champions (long course) ==
=== Men ===
Edition	Winner	Time	Notes	Ref.
(Japan) Fukuoka 2001	Ian Thorpe (AUS)	7:39.16	WR	
(Spain) Barcelona 2003	Grant Hackett (AUS)	7:43.82		
(Canada) Montreal 2005	Grant Hackett (AUS)	7:38.65	WR	
(Australia) Melbourne 2007	Przemysław Stańczyk (POL)	7:47.91		
(Italy) Rome 2009	Zhang Lin (CHN)	7:32.12	WR	
(China) Shanghai 2011	Sun Yang (CHN)	7:38.57		
(Spain) Barcelona 2013	Sun Yang (CHN)	7:41.36		
(Russia) Kazan 2015	Sun Yang (CHN)	7:39.96		
(Hungary) Budapest 2017	Gabriele Detti (ITA)	7:40.77		
(South Korea) Gwangju 2019	Gregorio Paltrinieri (ITA)	7:39.27		
(Hungary) Budapest 2022	Bobby Finke (USA)	7:39.36		
(Japan) Fukuoka 2023	Ahmed Hafnaoui (TUN)	7:37.00		
(Qatar) Doha 2024	Daniel Wiffen (IRL)	7:40.94		
Singapore 2025	Ahmed Jaouadi (TUN)	7:36.88		

=== Women ===
Edition	Winner	Time	Notes	Ref.
(Socialist Federal Republic of Yugoslavia) Belgrade 1973	Novella Calligaris (ITA)	8:52.97	WR	
(Colombia) Cali 1975	Jennifer Turrall (AUS)	8:44.75	CR	
(West Germany) West Berlin 1978	Tracey Wickham (AUS)	8:24.94	CR	
(Ecuador) Guayaquil 1982	Kim Linehan (USA)	8:27.48		
(Spain) Madrid 1986	Astrid Strauss (GDR)	8:28.24		
(Australia) Perth 1991	Janet Evans (USA)	8:24.05	CR	
(Italy) Rome 1994	Janet Evans (USA)	8:29.85		
(Australia) Perth 1998	Brooke Bennett (USA)	8:28.71		
(Japan) Fukuoka 2001	Hannah Stockbauer (GER)	8:24.66		
(Spain) Barcelona 2003	Hannah Stockbauer (GER)	8:23.66	CR	
(Canada) Montreal 2005	Kate Ziegler (USA)	8:25.31		
(Australia) Melbourne 2007	Kate Ziegler (USA)	8:18.52	CR	
(Italy) Rome 2009	Lotte Friis (DEN)	8:15.92	CR	
(China) Shanghai 2011	Rebecca Adlington (GBR)	8:17.51		
(Spain) Barcelona 2013	Katie Ledecky (USA)	8:13.86	WR	
(Russia) Kazan 2015	Katie Ledecky (USA)	8:07.39	WR	
(Hungary) Budapest 2017	Katie Ledecky (USA)	8:12.68		
(South Korea) Gwangju 2019	Katie Ledecky (USA)	8:13.58		
(Hungary) Budapest 2022	Katie Ledecky (USA)	8:08.04		
(Japan) Fukuoka 2023	Katie Ledecky (USA)	8:08.87		
(Qatar) Doha 2024	Simona Quadarella (ITA)	8:17.44		
Singapore 2025	Katie Ledecky (USA)	8:05.62	CR	

== World champions (short course) ==
=== Men ===
Edition	Winner	Time	Notes	Ref.
(Australia) Melbourne 2022	Gregorio Paltrinieri (ITA)	7:29.99	CR	
(Hungary) Budapest 2024	Zalán Sárkány (HUN)	7:30.56		

=== Women ===
Edition	Winner	Time	Notes	Ref.
(Spain) Palma de Mallorca 1993	Janet Evans (USA)	8:22.43	CR	
(Brazil) Rio de Janeiro 1995	Sarah Hardcastle (GBR)	8:26.46		
(Sweden) Gothenburg 1997	Natasha Bowron (AUS)	8:26.45		
Hong Kong 1999	Chen Hua (CHN)	8:20.13	CR	
(Greece) Athens 2000	Chen Hua (CHN)	8:17.03	CR	
(Russia) Moscow 2002	Chen Hua (CHN)	8:16.34	CR	
(United States) Indianapolis 2004	Sachiko Yamada (JPN)	8:18.21		
(China) Shanghai 2006	Anastasiya Ivanenko (RUS)	8:11.99	CR	
(United Kingdom) Manchester 2008	Rebecca Adlington (GBR)	8:08.25	CR	
(United Arab Emirates) Dubai 2010	Erika Villaecija (ESP)	8:11.61		
(Turkey) Istanbul 2012	Lauren Boyle (NZL)	8:08.62		
(Qatar) Doha 2014	Mireia Belmonte (ESP)	8:03.41	CR	
(Canada) Windsor 2016	Leah Smith (USA)	8:10.17		
(China) Hangzhou 2018	Wang Jianjiahe (CHN)	8:04.35		
(United Arab Emirates) Abu Dhabi 2021	Li Bingjie (CHN)	8:02.90	CR	
(Australia) Melbourne 2022	Lani Pallister (AUS)	8:04.07		
(Hungary) Budapest 2024	Lani Pallister (AUS)	8:01.95	CR	
