= 2012 FINA World Swimming Championships (25 m) – Women's 800 metre freestyle =

Women's 800m Freestyle at the 2012 Short Course Worlds
- Dates: 13 December
- Winning time: 8:08.62

Medalists
| gold medal | Lauren Boyle | New Zealand |
| silver medal | Lotte Friis | Denmark |
| bronze medal | Chloe Sutton | United States |

The women's 800 metre freestyle event at the 11th FINA World Swimming Championships (25m) took place 13 December 2012 at the Sinan Erdem Dome. This event was a timed-final where each swimmer swam just once. The top 8 seeded swimmers swam in the evening, and the remaining swimmers swam in the morning session.

== Records ==
Prior to this competition, the existing world and championship records were as follows.

| | Name | Nation | Time | Location | Date |
|---|---|---|---|---|---|
| World record | Camille Muffat | France | 8:01.06 | Angers | 16 November 2012 |
| Championship record | Rebecca Adlington | United Kingdom | 8:08.25 | Manchester | 10 April 2008 |

No new records were set during this competition.

== Results ==
| Rank | Heat | Lane | Name | Nationality | Time | Notes |
|---|---|---|---|---|---|---|
| 1st place, gold medalist(s) | 4 | 7 | Lauren Boyle | New Zealand | 8:08.62 | OC |
| 2nd place, silver medalist(s) | 4 | 4 | Lotte Friis | Denmark | 8:10.99 | |
| 3rd place, bronze medalist(s) | 4 | 3 | Chloe Sutton | United States | 8:15.53 | |
| 4 | 4 | 2 | Hannah Miley | Great Britain | 8:16.09 | |
| 5 | 4 | 5 | Erika Villaécija García | Spain | 8:16.90 | |
| 6 | 4 | 1 | Rebecca Mann | United States | 8:19.27 | |
| 7 | 1 | 5 | Xu Danlu | China | 8:22.88 | |
| 8 | 4 | 8 | Ellie Faulkner | Great Britain | 8:22.96 | |
| 9 | 4 | 6 | Melanie Costa | Spain | 8:23.56 | |
| 10 | 1 | 4 | Zhou Lili | China | 8:25.19 | |
| 11 | 3 | 5 | Marie Kamimura | Japan | 8:28.09 | |
| 12 | 3 | 1 | Samantha Arévalo | Ecuador | 8:28.31 | NR |
| 13 | 3 | 2 | Asami Chida | Japan | 8:28.60 | |
| 14 | 3 | 6 | Julia Hassler | Liechtenstein | 8:29.77 | |
| 15 | 3 | 0 | Evelyn Verrasztó | Hungary | 8:30.42 | |
| 16 | 3 | 3 | Tjasa Oder | Slovenia | 8:31.14 | |
| 17 | 3 | 8 | Michelle Weber | South Africa | 8:35.62 | |
| 18 | 3 | 7 | Virginia Bardach | Argentina | 8:42.35 | |
| 19 | 3 | 4 | Jessica Pengelly | South Africa | 8:49.07 | |
| 20 | 2 | 8 | Lani Cabrera | Barbados | 8:57.56 | NR |
| 21 | 2 | 3 | Maria Gabriela Santis Mejia | Guatemala | 8:59.19 | |
| 22 | 3 | 9 | Raina Saumi Grahana | Indonesia | 8:59.74 | |
| 23 | 2 | 5 | Daniela Miyahara | Peru | 9:01.06 | |
| 24 | 2 | 7 | Fatima Eugenia Flores | El Salvador | 9:09.66 | |
| 25 | 2 | 1 | Angie Galdamez | Honduras | 9:14.38 | |
| 26 | 2 | 6 | Ana Semiruncic | Moldova | 9:14.46 | |
| 27 | 2 | 2 | Erika García-Naranjo | Peru | 9:21.55 | |
| 28 | 2 | 4 | Valerie Gruest | Guatemala | 9:22.55 | |
| 29 | 1 | 3 | Monica Saili | Samoa | 9:23.63 | |
