= 2014 Pan Pacific Swimming Championships – Women's 800 metre freestyle =

Women's 800 metre freestyle at the 2014 Pan Pacific Swimming Championships
- Venue: Gold Coast Aquatic Centre
- Dates: August 21, 2014 (heats & finals)
- Competitors: 25
- Winning time: 8:11.35

Medalists
gold medal	Katie Ledecky	United States
silver medal	Lauren Boyle	New Zealand
bronze medal	Brittany MacLean	Canada

The women's 800 metre freestyle competition at the 2014 Pan Pacific Swimming Championships took place on August 21 at the Gold Coast Aquatic Centre. The last champion was Kate Ziegler of United States.

This event was a timed-final where each swimmer swam just once. The top 8 seeded swimmers swam in the evening, and the remaining swimmers swam in the morning session.

== Records ==
Prior to this competition, the existing world and Pan Pacific records were as follows:

World record	Katie Ledecky (USA)	8:11.00	Shenandoah, United States	June 22, 2014
Pan Pacific Championships record	Janet Evans (USA)	8:16.22	Tokyo, Japan	August 20, 1989

== Results ==
All times are in minutes and seconds.

KEY:	q	Fastest non-qualifiers	Q	Qualified	CR	Championships record	NR	National record	PB	Personal best	SB	Seasonal best

The first and final round were held on August 21, at 20:40.

Rank	Name	Nationality	Time	Notes
1st place, gold medalist(s)	Katie Ledecky	United States	8:11.35	CR
2nd place, silver medalist(s)	Lauren Boyle	New Zealand	8:18.87	
3rd place, bronze medalist(s)	Brittany MacLean	Canada	8:20.02	
4	Becca Mann	United States	8:22.45	
5	Cierra Runge	United States	8:25.17	
6	Andreina Pinto	Venezuela	8:30.66	
7	Haley Anderson	United States	8:30.87	
8	Alanna Bowles	Australia	8:31.92	
9	Leah Smith	United States	8:32.38	
10	Jessica Ashwood	Australia	8:34.62	
11	Kareena Lee	Australia	8:39.47	
12	Kristel Köbrich	Chile	8:40.79	
13	Tabitha Baumann	Canada	8:46.75	
14	Emma Robinson	New Zealand	8:49.80	
15	Chen Ziyi	China	9:06.04	
16	Leonora Parmeleau	Canada	9:10.06	
17	Hei Tung Cheng	Hong Kong	9:32.30	
