= Swimming at the 2012 Summer Olympics – Women's 800 metre freestyle =

Women's 800 metre freestyle at the Games of the XXX Olympiad
- Venue: London Aquatics Centre
- Dates: August 2, 2012 (heats); August 3, 2012 (final)
- Competitors: 36 from 30 nations
- Winning time: 8:14.63 AM

Medalists
1st place, gold medalist(s)		Katie Ledecky	United States
2nd place, silver medalist(s)		Mireia Belmonte García	Spain
3rd place, bronze medalist(s)		Rebecca Adlington	Great Britain

The women's 800 metre freestyle event at the 2012 Summer Olympics took place on 2–3 August at the London Aquatics Centre based at the Olympic park London.

Aged 15, American Katie Ledecky narrowly missed the world record on the final lap to recapture the first Olympic title for the Americans since Brooke Bennett in 2000. Strengthening her lead almost the entire race, she headed into the 750-metre turn under world-record pace, and pulled off a stunning upset from the rest of the field to post a personal best and smash Janet Evans' 23-year-old U.S. record in 8:14.63. Spain's Mireia Belmonte García added a second silver to her Olympic hardware in a national record of 8:18.76. Meanwhile, Great Britain's Rebecca Adlington, the reigning Olympic champion, tried to hold on with Ledecky earlier through the race, but faded down the stretch to pick up a bronze in 8:20.32.

New Zealand's Lauren Boyle finished with a fourth-place time and an Oceanian record of 8:22.72. Meanwhile, Denmark's Lotte Friis, the defending bronze medalist, opened the race with an early lead, but dropped back to fifth with a time of 8:23.86. France's Coralie Balmy (8:29.26) and Venezuela's Andreina Pinto (8:29.28) rounded out the field in one of the program's long-distance pool races.

== Records ==
Prior to this competition, the existing world and Olympic records were as follows.

World record	Rebecca Adlington (GBR)	8:14.10	Beijing, China	16 August 2008
Olympic record	Rebecca Adlington (GBR)	8:14.10	Beijing, China	16 August 2008

== Results ==
=== Heats ===
Rank	Heat	Lane	Name	Nationality	Time	Notes
1	5	4	Rebecca Adlington	Great Britain	8:21.78	Q
2	4	4	Lotte Friis	Denmark	8:21.89	Q
3	3	4	Katie Ledecky	United States	8:23.84	Q
4	3	5	Mireia Belmonte García	Spain	8:25.26	Q
5	5	6	Lauren Boyle	New Zealand	8:25.91	Q, NR
6	4	3	Boglárka Kapás	Hungary	8:26.43	Q
6	4	8	Andreina Pinto	Venezuela	8:26.43	Q, NR
8	4	2	Coralie Balmy	France	8:27.15	Q
9	5	3	Shao Yiwen	China	8:27.78	
10	5	2	Erika Villaecija García	Spain	8:27.99	
11	3	1	Alexa Komarnycky	Canada	8:28.11	
12	3	3	Wendy Trott	South Africa	8:28.98	
13	3	2	Éva Risztov	Hungary	8:29.06	
14	4	7	Kristel Köbrich	Chile	8:29.55	
15	5	1	Savannah King	Canada	8:29.72	
16	5	8	Cecilia Biagioli	Argentina	8:33.97	NR
17	2	4	Julia Hassler	Liechtenstein	8:35.18	NR
18	4	6	Kylie Palmer	Australia	8:35.75	
19	2	2	Katya Bachrouche	Lebanon	8:35.88	NR
20	5	7	Jessica Ashwood	Australia	8:37.21	
21	5	5	Kate Ziegler	United States	8:37.38	
22	3	6	Ellie Faulkner	Great Britain	8:38.00	
23	4	1	Camelia Potec	Romania	8:38.44	
24	4	5	Xin Xin	China	8:40.88	
25	2	5	Tjaša Oder	Slovenia	8:41.82	
26	3	8	Yelena Sokolova	Russia	8:42.73	
27	2	6	Patricia Castañeda Miyamoto	Mexico	8:44.44	
28	2	3	Nina Dittrich	Austria	8:45.41	
29	1	4	Samantha Arevalo	Ecuador	8:49.21	NR
30	2	7	Cai Lin Khoo	Malaysia	8:51.18	
31	2	1	Lynette Lim	Singapore	8:52.92	
32	2	8	Han Na-kyeong	South Korea	8:57.26	
33	1	5	Pamela Benitez	El Salvador	9:02.66	
34	1	6	Danielle van den Berg	Aruba	9:23.21	
35	1	3	Simona Marinova	Macedonia	9:28.41	
	3	7	Grainne Murphy	Ireland	DNS	

=== Final ===
Rank	Lane	Name	Nationality	Time	Notes
1st place, gold medalist(s)	3	Katie Ledecky	United States	8:14.63	AM
2nd place, silver medalist(s)	6	Mireia Belmonte García	Spain	8:18.76	NR
3rd place, bronze medalist(s)	4	Rebecca Adlington	Great Britain	8:20.32	
4	2	Lauren Boyle	New Zealand	8:22.72	OC
5	5	Lotte Friis	Denmark	8:23.86	
6	7	Boglárka Kapás	Hungary	8:23.89	NR
7	8	Coralie Balmy	France	8:29.26	
8	1	Andreina Pinto	Venezuela	8:29.28	
