= Swimming at the 2010 South American Games – Women's 800 metre freestyle =

The women's 800m freestyle event at the 2010 South American Games was held on March 27, with the slow heat at 10:14 and the fast heat at 18:00.

== Medalists ==
Gold	Silver	Bronze
Andreina Pinto; Venezuela	Kristel Kobrich; Chile	Joanna Maranhão; Brazil

== Records ==
Standing records prior to the 2010 South American Games
World record	Rebecca Adlington (GBR)	8:14.10	Beijing, China	18 August 2008
Competition Record	Kristel Kobrich (CHI)	8:43.79	Buenos Aires, Argentina	16 November 2006
South American record	Kristel Kobrich (CHI)	8:27.90	Rome, Italy	31 July 2009

== Results ==
=== Final ===
Rank	Heat	Lane	Athlete	Result	Notes
1st place, gold medalist(s)	2	3	Andreina Pinto (VEN)	8:40.05	CR
2nd place, silver medalist(s)	2	4	Kristel Kobrich (CHI)	8:40.20	
3rd place, bronze medalist(s)	2	5	Joanna Maranhão (BRA)	8:42.09	
4	2	6	Cecilia Biagioli (ARG)	8:56.57	
5	2	2	Yanel Adriana Pinto (VEN)	9:08.86	
6	2	7	Sarah Correa (BRA)	9:14.00	
7	2	8	Andrea del Rosario Rodriguez (PER)	9:16.68	
8	1	3	Isabela Acuña (COL)	9:24.86	
9	1	4	Katia Paola Esquivel (ECU)	9:30.07	
10	1	5	Julio Laurentino (PAR)	9:30.59	
11	1	2	Mariana Schnettler Ramirez (CHI)	9:35.55	
12	1	6	Marcela Martinez (COL)	9:43.17	
13	1	7	Karlene van der Jagt (SUR)	10:22.30	
14	2	1	Samantha Michelle Salinas (ECU)	11:20.20	
