= 2010 Pan Pacific Swimming Championships – Women's 1500 metre freestyle =

Women's 1500 metre freestyle at the 2010 Pan Pacific Swimming Championships
- Venue: William Woollett Jr. Aquatics Center
- Dates: August 21, 2010 (heats & finals)
- Competitors: 10 from 5 nations
- Winning time: 16:01.53

Medalists
| gold medal | Melissa Gorman | Australia |
| silver medal | Kate Ziegler | United States |
| bronze medal | Kristel Kobrich | Chile |

The women's 1500 metre freestyle competition at the 2010 Pan Pacific Swimming Championships took place on August 21 at the William Woollett Jr. Aquatics Center. The last champion was Kate Ziegler of US.

This event was a timed-final where each swimmer swam just once. The top 8 seeded swimmers swam in the evening, and the remaining swimmers swam in the morning session.

== Records ==
Prior to this competition, the existing world and Pan Pacific records were as follows:

| World record | Kate Ziegler (USA) | 15:42.54 | Mission Viejo, United States | June 17, 2007 |
| Pan Pacific Championships record | Kate Ziegler (USA) | 15:55.01 | Victoria, Canada | August 17, 2006 |

== Results ==
All times are in minutes and seconds.

| KEY: | q | Fastest non-qualifiers | Q | Qualified | CR | Championships record | NR | National record | PB | Personal best | SB | Seasonal best |

The first round was held on August 21, at 11:19, and the final was held on August 21, at 20:09.

| Rank | Heat | Lane | Name | Nationality | Time | Notes |
|---|---|---|---|---|---|---|
| 1st place, gold medalist(s) | 2 | 5 | Melissa Gorman | Australia | 16:01.53 | |
| 2nd place, silver medalist(s) | 2 | 3 | Kate Ziegler | United States | 16:03.26 | |
| 3rd place, bronze medalist(s) | 2 | 4 | Kristel Kobrich | Chile | 16:06.57 | |
| 4 | 2 | 6 | Haley Anderson | United States | 16:18.10 | |
| 5 | 2 | 2 | Maiko Fujino | Japan | 16:19.15 | |
| 6 | 2 | 7 | Chika Yonenaga | Japan | 16:24.71 | |
| 7 | 1 | 4 | Yumi Kida | Japan | 16:35.47 | |
| 8 | 1 | 5 | Yurie Yano | Japan | 16:41.22 | |
| 9 | 2 | 1 | Danielle Defrancesco | Australia | 16:47.33 | |
| 10 | 2 | 8 | Savannah King | Canada | 16:48.49 | |
