= Jessica Ashwood =

Australian swimmer (born 1993)

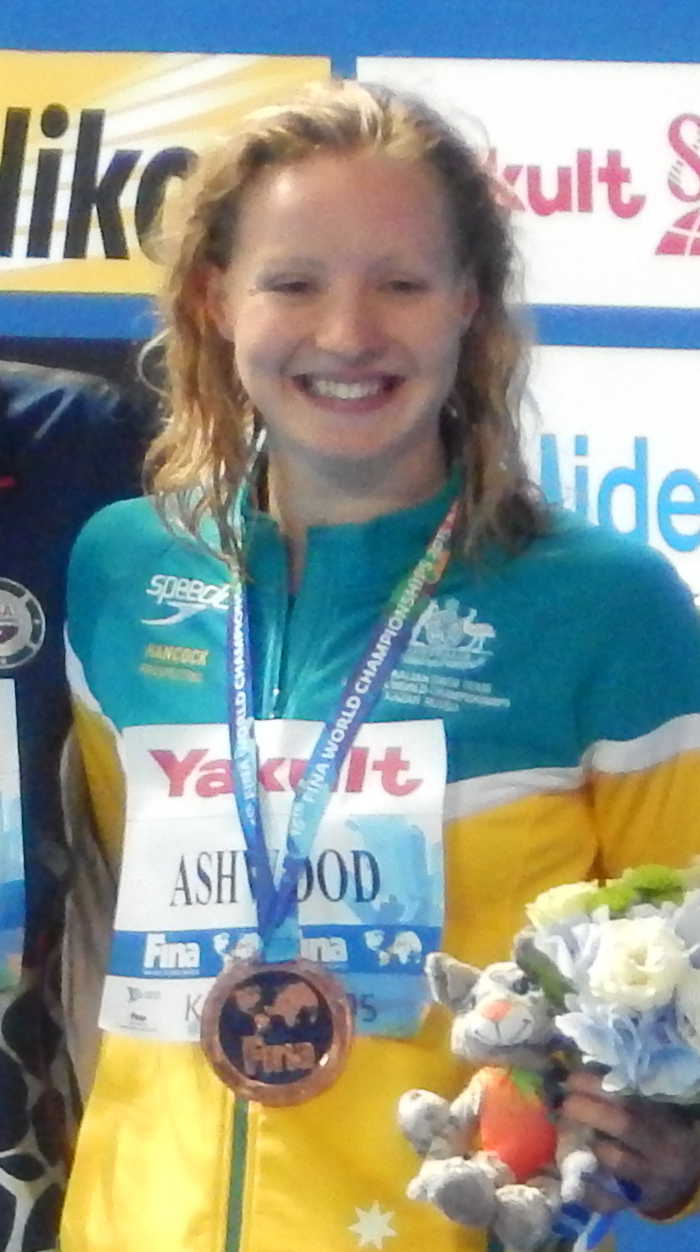
- Ashwood at the 2015 World Aquatics Championships

Personal information
- Full name: Jessica Ashwood
- Nickname: "Jess"
- National team: Australia
- Born: 28 April 1993 (age 33) Darlinghurst, New South Wales
- Height: 1.73 m (5 ft 8 in)
- Weight: 67 kg (148 lb)

Sport
- Sport: Swimming
- Strokes: Freestyle
- Club: Chandler
- Coach: Vince Raleigh
Medal record
Women's swimming
Representing Australia
Olympic Games
Silver medal – second place	2016 Rio de Janeiro	4×200 m freestyle
World Championships (LC)
Bronze medal – third place	2015 Kazan	400 m freestyle
Commonwealth Games
Silver medal – second place	2018 Gold Coast	800 m freestyle

Jessica Ashwood (born 28 April 1993) is a retired Australian swimmer. She won a silver medal at the 2016 Summer Olympics.

== Personal life ==
Ashwood was born in Darlinghurst, New South Wales, on 28 April 1993. She is from the suburb of Padstow, She attended Regina Coeli Primary School before going to high school at MLC School.

Ashwood was diagnosed with scoliosis at the age of 13. After retiring from swimming in 2018, she underwent spinal fusion, which corrected her spinal alignment and increased her height by 10 cm.

== Career ==
At the 2011 World Championships in Shanghai, Ashwood finished fifteenth in the 1500 m freestyle.

Ashwood qualified for the 2012 Olympics in London. She competed in the 800 m freestyle and finished twentieth.

Ashwood competed at the 2013 World Championships in Barcelona, finishing tenth in the 800 m freestyle.

In February 2014, Ashwood competed at the 2014 New South Wales Championships. She went 8:19.76 in the 800 m freestyle, breaking Kylie Palmer's Australian record of 8:22.81 from 2008.

In July 2014, Ashwood competed at the Commonwealth Games in Glasgow. She placed sixth in the 800 m freestyle with a time of 8:29.32. She finished ninth in the 400 m freestyle and missed the final.

In August 2014, Ashwood competed at the Pan Pacific Championships on the Gold Coast. She came tenth in the 400 and 800 m freestyle events, with times of 4:12.08 and 8:34.62, respectively.

In June 2015, at the Swimming Australia Grand Prix in Townsville, Ashwood went 15:56.86 in the 1500 m freestyle. This broke Melissa Gorman's national record of 16:01.53 from 2010.

In August 2015, Ashwood competed at the World Championships in Kazan. Her first event was the 400 m freestyle, where she recorded 4:03.34 to win the bronze medal. This broke Palmer's Australian record of 4:03.40 from 2012. Ashwood then competed in the 1500 m freestyle, where in the heats, she posted a time of 15:56.52 to lower her own national record and qualify third-fastest for the final. In the final, Ashwood improved her record to 15:52.17 and finished fifth. Her next event was the 4 × 200 m freestyle relay. Swimming the second leg, Ashwood split 1:58.32, contributing to an overall time of 7:51.02 which placed Australia sixth. Ashwood's final event was the 800 m freestyle, where she recorded 8:18.41 to finish fourth, 0.26 seconds slower than the bronze medalist. With her performance, Ashwood yet again broke her own national record.

In June 2016, Ashwood competed at the Pro Swim Series in Santa Clara, posting a time of 8:18.14 in the 800 m freestyle to set another Australian record. Her mark stood until 2018.

In August 2016, Ashwood competed at the Rio de Janeiro Olympics. Her first event was the 400 m freestyle, where went 4:05.68 to finish seventh. She then swam the heats of the 4 × 200 m freestyle relay. She was replaced by Emma McKeon in the final; Australia eventually won the silver medal. Ashwood’s final event was the 800 m freestyle, where she finished fifth in a time of 8:20.32.

At the 2017 Australian Championships in Brisbane, Ashwood finished second in the 800 m freestyle with a time of 8:25.61, qualifying for the world championships. She later withdrew from the team, however, with the intention of extending her career.

Ashwood then competed at the 2018 Commonwealth Games on the Gold Coast. She won the silver medal in the 800 m freestyle with a time of 8:27.60. She then finished fifth in the 400 m freestyle, recording a time of 4:10.32.

Later in 2018, Ashwood retired from swimming.
