= 2006 Pan Pacific Swimming Championships – Women's 1500 metre freestyle =

Women's 1500 metre freestyle at the 2006 Pan Pacific Swimming Championships
- Venue: Saanich Commonwealth Place
- Dates: August 17, 2006 (heats & finals)
- Competitors: 12 from 5 nations
- Winning time: 15:55.01

Medalists
gold medal	Kate Ziegler	United States
silver medal	Hayley Peirsol	United States
bronze medal	Ai Shibata	Japan

The women's 1500 metre freestyle competition at the 2006 Pan Pacific Swimming Championships took place on August 17 at the Saanich Commonwealth Place. The last champion was Diana Munz of US.

This event was a timed-final where each swimmer swam just once. The top 8 seeded swimmers swam in the evening, and the remaining swimmers swam in the morning session.

== Records ==
Prior to this competition, the existing world and Pan Pacific records were as follows:

World record	Janet Evans (USA)	15:52.10	Orlando, United States	March 26, 1988
Pan Pacific Championships record	Hayley Lewis (AUS)	16:04.84	Kobe, Japan	August 12, 1992

== Results ==
All times are in minutes and seconds.

KEY:	q	Fastest non-qualifiers	Q	Qualified	CR	Championships record	NR	National record	PB	Personal best	SB	Seasonal best

The first round was held on August 17, at 11:12, and the final was held on August 17, at 20:14.

Rank	Heat	Lane	Name	Nationality	Time	Notes
1st place, gold medalist(s)	2	4	Kate Ziegler	United States	15:55.01	CR
2nd place, silver medalist(s)	2	5	Hayley Peirsol	United States	15:57.36	
3rd place, bronze medalist(s)	2	2	Ai Shibata	Japan	16:11.13	
4	2	1	Kristel Köbrich	Chile	16:25.85	
5	2	3	Sachiko Yamada	Japan	16:28.47	
6	2	6	Melissa Gorman	Australia	16:29.10	
7	1	4	Kelsey Ditto	United States	16:31.95	
8	2	8	Savannah King	Canada	16:46.38	
9	2	7	Sarah Paton	Australia	16:55.97	
10	1	5	Monica Stitski	Canada	17:04.78	
11	1	6	Lauren Arndt	Australia	17:16.93	
12	1	3	Melissa Benson	Australia	17:43.09	
