= Swimming at the 2010 Commonwealth Games – Women's 800 metre freestyle =

The Women's 800 metre freestyle event at the 2010 Commonwealth Games took place on 6 and 7 October 2010, at the SPM Swimming Pool Complex.

Two heats were held. The heat in which a swimmer competed did not formally matter for advancement, as the swimmers with the top eight times from the entire field qualified for the finals.

== Heats ==
=== Heat 1 ===
Rank	Lane	Name	Nationality	Time	Notes
1	5	Wendy Trott	South Africa	8:34.34	Q
2	6	Alexandra Komarnycky	Canada	8:36.71	
3	4	Katie Goldman	Australia	8:38.91	Q
4	3	Sasha Matthews	England	8:41.10	Q
5	2	Aimee Willmott	England	8:46.91	Q
6	7	Victoria Ho	Jamaica	9:35.67	

=== Heat 2 ===
Rank	Lane	Name	Nationality	Time	Notes
1	4	Rebecca Adlington	England	8:35.82	Q
2	3	Melissa Gorman	Australia	8:38.16	Q
3	5	Blair Evans	Australia	8:39.49	Q
4	2	Megan Gilchrist	Scotland	8:46.85	Q
5	7	Richa Mishra	India	9:11.09	
6	1	Tori Flowers	Cayman Islands	9:49.86	

== Final ==
Rank	Lane	Name	Nationality	Time	Notes
1st place, gold medalist(s)	5	Rebecca Adlington	England	8:24.69	
2nd place, silver medalist(s)	4	Wendy Trott	South Africa	8:26.96	
3rd place, bronze medalist(s)	3	Melissa Gorman	Australia	8:32.37	
4	6	Katie Goldman	Australia	8:38.65	
5	2	Blair Evans	Australia	8:39.66	
6	7	Sasha Matthews	England	8:45.28	
7	1	Megan Gilchrist	Scotland	8:47.83	
8	8	Aimee Willmott	England	8:49.31	
