= Savannah King =

Savannah King may refer to:

- Savy King (born 2005), American soccer player
- Savannah King (swimmer) (born 1992), Canadian swimmer
