= Han Na-kyeong =

South Korean swimmer (born 1993)

Personal information
- Nationality: South Korea
- Born: 23 June 1993 (age 33) Seoul, South Korea
- Height: 1.60 m (5 ft 3 in)
- Weight: 53 kg (117 lb)

Korean name
- Hangul: 한나경
- RR: Han Nagyeong
- MR: Han Nagyŏng

Sport
- Sport: Swimming
- Strokes: Freestyle
- Club: Sehyeon High School

Han Na-kyeong (Korean: 한나경; born June 23, 1993, in Seoul) is a South Korean swimmer, who specialized in long-distance freestyle events. Han is a member of the swimming team at Sehyeon High School in Seoul.

Han qualified for the women's 800 m freestyle at the 2012 Summer Olympics in London, by eclipsing a FINA B-standard entry time of 8:50.16 from the Dong-A Swimming Championships in Ulsan. She challenged seven other swimmers on the second heat, including two-time Olympians Lynette Lim of Singapore, Khoo Cai Lin of Malaysia, and Nina Dittrich of Austria. She rounded out the field to last place by five seconds behind Lim in 8:57.26. Han failed to qualify for the final, as she placed thirty-second overall in the preliminary heats.
