= Kate Ziegler =

American swimmer (born 1988)

Personal information
- Full name: Kate Marie Ziegler
- National team: United States
- Born: June 27, 1988 (age 38) Fairfax, Virginia, U.S.
- Height: 6 ft 0 in (183 cm)
- Weight: 161 lb (73 kg)

Sport
- Sport: Swimming
- Strokes: Freestyle
- Club: FISH
Medal record
Women's swimming
Representing the United States
World Championships (LC)
Gold medal – first place	2005 Montreal	800 m freestyle
Gold medal – first place	2005 Montreal	1500 m freestyle
Gold medal – first place	2007 Melbourne	800 m freestyle
Gold medal – first place	2007 Melbourne	1500 m freestyle
Silver medal – second place	2011 Shanghai	1500 m freestyle
Bronze medal – third place	2011 Shanghai	800 m freestyle
World Championships (SC)
Gold medal – first place	2006 Shanghai	400 m freestyle
Silver medal – second place	2004 Indianapolis	800 m freestyle
Silver medal – second place	2006 Shanghai	800 m freestyle
Bronze medal – third place	2006 Shanghai	4×200 m freestyle
Bronze medal – third place	2010 Dubai	800 m freestyle
Pan Pacific Championships
Gold medal – first place	2006 Victoria	800 m freestyle
Gold medal – first place	2006 Victoria	1500 m freestyle
Gold medal – first place	2010 Irvine	800 m freestyle
Silver medal – second place	2010 Irvine	1500 m freestyle

Kate Marie Ziegler (born June 27, 1988) is an American competition swimmer who specializes in freestyle and long-distance events. Ziegler has won a total of fifteen medals in major international competition, including eight golds, five silvers, and two bronzes spanning the World Aquatics and the Pan Pacific Championships. She was a member of the 2012 United States Olympic team, and competed in the 800-meter freestyle event at the 2012 Summer Olympics.

== Early years ==
Ziegler was born in 1988 in Fairfax, Virginia, the daughter of Don and Cathy Ziegler. She was a part of a local swim team, FISH, where she was coached under Ray Benecki. She attended Forestville Elementary School in Great Falls, Virginia and Bishop Denis J. O'Connell High School in Arlington County, Virginia. At O'Connell, she excelled throughout her four years, earning Washington Post All-Met honors four straight years, including being named Swimmer of the Year on more than one occasion.

As a freshman, she finished third in the 200-yard freestyle (1:51.59) and won the 500-yard freestyle (4:47.78) at the 2003 Metros Swimming and Diving Championships, breaking the 15-year-old record in the 500 held by Pam Minthorn. She also anchored O'Connell's 200-yard freestyle relay (24.51 split) and 400-yard freestyle relay (53.65 split) to seventh and sixth-place finishes, respectively. As a sophomore the following year, she won both the 200-yard freestyle (1:46.15) and the 500-yard freestyle (4:41.91) in record time, and anchored the winning 200-yard freestyle relay (24.14 split) and third place 400-yard freestyle relay (51.63 split). Her times continued to drop rapidly, and as a junior she again won both the 200-yard freestyle (1:45.43) and 500-yard freestyle (4:37.67) in record time, the latter being an independent national high school record.

As a senior, she continued to excel, tying the national high school record in the 200-yard freestyle (1:45.49) and breaking the American record held by Janet Evans in the 500-yard freestyle (4:35.35).

Ziegler initially attended George Mason University, and later transferred to Chapman University in 2011.

== International career ==
=== 2004-05 ===
At the 2004 Short Course Worlds, she finished second to Japan's Sachiko Yamada in the 800-meter freestyle with a time of 8:20.55. Her 400-meter split would have placed fourth in the event at the meet.

In February 2005, at the FINA World Cup stop in New York, Ziegler won the 800-meter freestyle in 8:16.32, breaking Cynthia Woodhead's 25-year-old American record, which at the time was the oldest American record on the books.

In 2005, Ziegler won the 800-meter freestyle (8:25.31) and 1,500-meter freestyle (16:00.41) at the World Championships in Montreal. The latter time made her the third-fastest woman (and second-fastest American) in the history of the event, following only world-record holder Janet Evans's 15:52.10 and German Hannah Stockbauer's 16:00.18. She qualified for Worlds after winning the 800-meter freestyle at World Trials in Indianapolis with a time of 8:34.83. She failed to qualify in the 400-meter freestyle, finishing third in a time of 4:12.09.

=== 2006-08 ===
At the 2006 Pan Pacific Swimming Championships, she swam the 1,500-meter freestyle in 15:55.01, making her the second fastest swimmer of all time in that event and only the second person to break the sixteen-minute mark. The third person was Hayley Peirsol who finished the event just two seconds later.

In 2007, at an in-season meet, Ziegler broke Janet Evans's longstanding world record in the 1500-meter freestyle with a time of 15:42.54. It stood for six years until Katie Ledecky broke the record in 2013.

At the 2007 World Championships, she won the 800-meter freestyle and 1,500-meter freestyle, to defend the titles she had won in 2005.

In 2008, Ziegler qualified for the Olympic Games by placing second to Katie Hoff in both the 400-meter (4:03.92) and 800-meter (8:25.38) freestyle events. At the 2008 Summer Olympics in Beijing, however, Ziegler failed to qualify for the finals in either event. Notably, her best time in the 800-meter would have netted her a silver medal.

=== 2012 Summer Olympics ===
At the 2012 United States Olympic Trials in Omaha, Nebraska, Ziegler made the U.S. Olympic team for the second time by placing second behind Katie Ledecky in the 800-meter freestyle with a time of 8:21.87. She also competed in the 400-meter freestyle and finished seventh in the final (4:09.17).

At the 2012 Summer Olympics in London, Ziegler swam in the fastest qualifying heat of 800-meter freestyle and posted a time of 8:37.38, behind Rebecca Adlington of the United Kingdom and Lauren Boyle of New Zealand. Only the top eight swimmers of all five qualifying heats advanced to the 800-meter finals (with 8:27.15 as the slowest times of those eight), and Ziegler did not advance.

=== 2015 ===
In May, Ziegler returned to competition after a two-year break.

== See also ==
- List of United States records in swimming
- List of World Aquatics Championships medalists in swimming (women)
- List of world records in swimming
- World record progression 800 metres freestyle
- World record progression 1500 metres freestyle

Records
Preceded by Janet Evans	Women's 1,500-meter freestyle world record-holder (long course); June 17, 2007 – July 30, 2013	Succeeded by Katie Ledecky
Preceded by Laure Manaudou	Women's 800-meter freestyle world record-holder (short course); October 12, 2007 – December 12, 2008	Succeeded by Alessia Filippi
Preceded by Laure Manaudou	Women's 1,500-meter freestyle world record-holder (short course); October 12, 2007 – November 29, 2009	Succeeded by Lotte Friis
