= Rebecca Adlington =

English swimmer (born 1989)

Rebecca Adlington OBE
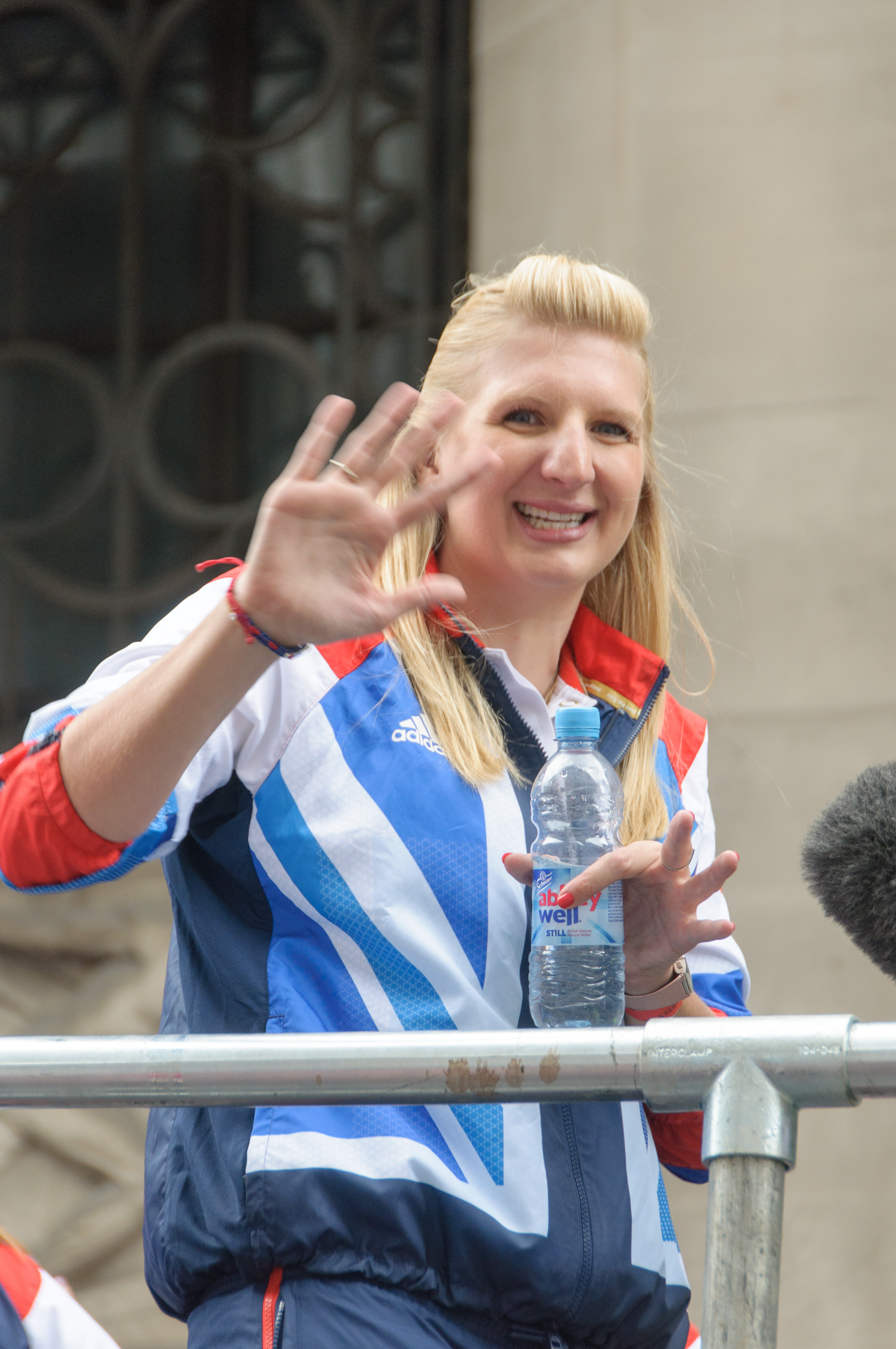
- Adlington in the Our Greatest Team Parade

Personal information
- Full name: Rebecca Adlington
- National team: Great Britain
- Born: 17 February 1989 (age 37) Mansfield, Nottinghamshire, England
- Height: 5 ft 10 in (179 cm)
- Weight: 11 st 0 lb; 154 lb (70 kg)

Sport
- Sport: Swimming
- Strokes: Freestyle
- Club: Nova Centurion
- Coach: Bill Furniss
Medal record
Women's swimming
Representing Great Britain
Event	1st	2nd	3rd
Olympic Games	2	0	2
World Championships (LC)	1	1	2
World Championships (SC)	1	1	0
European Championships (LC)	1	1	1
Commonwealth Games	2	0	2
Total	7	3	7
Olympic Games
Gold medal – first place	2008 Beijing	400 m freestyle
Gold medal – first place	2008 Beijing	800 m freestyle
Bronze medal – third place	2012 London	400 m freestyle
Bronze medal – third place	2012 London	800 m freestyle
World Championships (LC)
Gold medal – first place	2011 Shanghai	800 m freestyle
Silver medal – second place	2011 Shanghai	400 m freestyle
Bronze medal – third place	2009 Rome	400 m freestyle
Bronze medal – third place	2009 Rome	4×200 m freestyle
World Championships (SC)
Gold medal – first place	2008 Manchester	800 m freestyle
Silver medal – second place	2008 Manchester	4×200 m freestyle
European Championships (LC)
Gold medal – first place	2010 Budapest	400 m freestyle
Silver medal – second place	2006 Budapest	800 m freestyle
Bronze medal – third place	2010 Budapest	4×200 m freestyle
Representing England
Commonwealth Games
Gold medal – first place	2010 Delhi	400 m freestyle
Gold medal – first place	2010 Delhi	800 m freestyle
Bronze medal – third place	2010 Delhi	200 m freestyle
Bronze medal – third place	2010 Delhi	4×200 m freestyle

Rebecca Adlington (born 17 February 1989) is an English former competitive swimmer who raced in freestyle events. She won two gold medals at the 2008 Summer Olympics, in the 400 m and 800 m freestyle events, breaking the 19-year-old world record of Janet Evans in the latter. Adlington was Great Britain's first Olympic swimming champion since 1988, and the first British swimmer to win multiple Olympic gold medals at a single Games since 1908.

After winning her first World Championship gold over 800 m in 2011, along with silver in the 400 m freestyle at the same competition, she won bronze medals in both the 400 m and 800 m freestyle events at the 2012 Summer Olympics in London. Adlington has won gold medals at the Olympic Games, World Championships, European Championships and the Commonwealth Games. On 5 February 2013, she retired from competitive swimming at the age of 23, and in 2016, she was inducted into the International Swimming Hall of Fame. Since her retirement, Adlington has worked for the BBC as a pundit at the Olympic Games and Commonwealth Games, as well as making various other media appearances.

== Life and career ==
=== 1989–2008 ===
Rebecca Adlington was born on 17 February 1989 in Mansfield, Nottinghamshire, where she attended Broomhill School and then The Brunts School. The youngest of three sisters, she took up swimming aged four, and aged nine, began swimming competitively with Sherwood Colliery Swimming Club. Aged twelve, she became a member of Nova Centurion Swimming Club in Nottingham, where Bill Furniss began coaching her. He would continue coaching Adlington during her senior-level career. Adlington made her international debut at the 2003 European Youth Olympic Festival, where she finished with silver medals in both the 400 m and 800 m freestyle events.

In 2004, Adlington was unsuccessful in her attempts to qualify for that summer's Olympic Games in Athens, where she fell short in the 200 m, 400 m, and 800 m freestyle events at the Olympic trials. That same year, she won a gold medal in the 800 m freestyle at the 2004 European Junior Swimming Championships, but her 2005 season was disrupted after she contracted glandular fever. The illness, followed by post-viral fatigue, also caused her to miss the 2006 Commonwealth Games. At the 2006 European Aquatics Championships in Budapest, Adlington won silver in the 800 m freestyle. She finished the race more than eight seconds behind France's Laure Manaudou. At the British Championships that year, Adlington finished first in the 800 m freestyle, second in the 400 m freestyle, and third in the 200 m freesyle. In 2007, she set a personal best time in winning the 800 m freestyle at the ASA National Championships, but at the World Championships in Melbourne, she finished tenth in the 800 m freestyle, and failed to qualify for the final.

At the 2008 World Short Cross Championships, Adlington came within 0.25 seconds of breaking Kate Ziegler's world record on her way to victory in the 800 m freestyle. Her time of 8:08.25 was over seven seconds quicker than Joanne Jackson's national record, and exactly three seconds faster than the European record that had been held by Manaudou. She also won a silver medal in the 4 × 200 m relay; the British team finished 0.06 seconds behind the Dutch. Adlington broke her 400 m freestyle commonwealth record at the 2008 British Championships, securing victory with a time of 4:02.80. She also set a new national record time of 1:56.66 in the 200 m freestyle at the same meet.

Having successfully progressed through the British Olympic Trials, Adlington competed in the 400 m freestyle and 800 m freestyle events at the 2008 Summer Olympics in Beijing. She was also scheduled to swim in the 4×200 m freestyle relay but was rested in the heat, and the team failed to qualify for the final. In the heats of the 400 m freestyle, Adlington broke the commonwealth record with a time of 4:02.24 as she qualified for the final second quickest. In the final, she won the gold medal with a time of 4:03.22. Adlington was fifth with 100 metres remaining, but a strong finish saw her overtake Katie Hoff of the United States in the final metres of the race. She was the first woman to win an Olympic gold medal in swimming for Great Britain since Anita Lonsbrough in 1960.

Adlington set a new Olympic record time of 8:18.06 in the preliminary heats of the women's 800 m freestyle. She won the final in a world record time of 8:14.10, her second gold medal of the competition. She finished six seconds ahead of Italy's silver medallist Alessia Filippi, and 2.12 seconds quicker than the former world record which had been set by Janet Evans in the year that Adlington was born. At the time, this was swimming's longest-standing world record. She matched athlete and double gold-medallist Kelly Holmes' achievement in 2004 as the best performance by a British woman at a single Olympic Games. She became the first British swimmer to win more than one gold medal at a single Olympic Games since Henry Taylor in 1908.

=== 2009–2013 ===
In 2009, Adlington said she felt the extra pressure and expectation of being a double Olympic champion, and that it was more difficult than she had anticipated. She also stated that media work had affected her swimming. She finished second behind Jackson in the 400 m freestyle at the 2009 British Championships; Jackson broke the world record, with Adlington's time being the second fastest ever recorded. At the 2009 World Aquatics Championships in Rome, she swam a personal best time of 4:00.79 to win bronze in the 400 m freestyle. Adlington chose to compete in the Speedo LZR swimsuit in which she had won her two Olympic gold medals. The seven other finalists all wore polyurethane costumes which the sports' governing body FINA banned in 2010. She added a second bronze in the 4×200 m freestyle. The quartet of Adlington, Jackson, Jazz Carlin and Caitlin McClatchey set a European record time of 7:45.51. She also finished fourth in the 800 m freestyle. At the end of 2009, Adlington was selected to represent the European E-Stars team at the Duel in the Pool, a contest against American swimmers held in Manchester. She achieved victory in the 800 m, but was second behind Allison Schmitt in the 400 m.

In 2010, Adlington won the 800 m freestyle at the Mare Nostrum in Barcelona. At the European Aquatics Championships in Budapest; she achieved victory in the 400 m, finishing 0.85 seconds clear of second-placed Danish swimmer Lotte Friis. She had earlier finished seventh in the 800 m freestyle. She also won bronze as part of the 4×200 m freestyle relay team with Carlin, Jackson and Hannah Miley.

Adlington qualified for her first Commonwealth Games after finishing first at the 200 m at the 2010 British Championships. At the Games in New Delhi, she won a bronze medal in the 200 m freestyle, the first time she had raced the distance in an international competition. She was also part of the 4×200 m freestyle relay team that won bronze. In the 800 m freestyle, Adlington led from the start to win her first Commonwealth Games gold medal. Her winning time was 0.05 seconds shy of the Commonwealth Games record, and she had suffered a stomach upset the night before. In the 400 m freestyle, Adlington won her second gold medal of the Games, and in doing so broke Sarah Hardcastle's Commonwealth Games record by two seconds which had been set in 1986.

Adlington finished first in the 400 m freestyle at the 2011 British Championships with a time of 4:02.84. She then edged out Carlin in the 200 m, before claiming victory in the 800 m freestyle, her third win in the competition. She was also victorious in the 800 m freestyle at the ASA National Championships where she won by a twenty-second margin. At the 2011 World Aquatics Championships in Shanghai, Adlington won the 800 m freestyle gold medal. With 100 metres of the race remaining, Adlington trailed Friis by 0.65 seconds, but she overtook the Dane to clinch victory by 0.69 seconds. Earlier in the competition, she claimed silver in the 400 m freestyle behind Italy's Federica Pellegrini.

Adlington qualified for the 2012 Summer Olympics in London by winning the 400 m and 800 m freestyle events at the British Championships. Prior to the Games, she was victorious in the 800 m freestyle at the Mare Nostrum in a competition-record time. At the Olympics, Adlington won bronze in the 400 m freestyle in a time of 4:03.01, as she finished behind Camille Muffat of France and Schmitt. She then secured a bronze in the 800 m freestyle, recording a time of 8:20.32 in a race won by American 15-year-old Katie Ledecky. Adlington had trailed her by one second at the halfway mark, but the American extended her lead, with Adlington finishing the race more than five seconds behind the gold medallist. After the Games, Adlington said that she would no longer undertake the 800 m race, and would not compete at the 2016 Summer Olympics in Rio de Janeiro. She was still considering if she would aim to compete in her shorter events at the 2014 Commonwealth Games in Glasgow.

On 5 February 2013, Adlington announced her retirement from swimming aged 23. She stated that she had "achieved everything [she] wanted too" and that she wished to "finish on a high". At the time of her retirement, Adlington was the most decorated female Olympian in Great Britain's history at the games. (Note: Both Laura Kenny (track cycling), and Charlotte Dujardin (dressage) have since surpassed her total of Olympic medals won.)

=== Post-retirement swimming activities ===
Adlington was named as an ambassador for the 2014 Commonwealth Games in Glasgow. Part of her role was appearing in promotional campaigns for the competition. In January 2014, it was announced that she would become a mentor to six "promising" British swimmers from the World Class Swimming Programme. In 2016, Rebecca Adlington's Swim Stars was launched, with an aim of helping primary school aged children learn to swim, as well as providing support to swimming pool operators on making the process as fun as possible. Together with former swimmers Steve Parry and Adrian Turner, Adlington founded Total Swimming Group, a company aiming to make the sport more accessible to the public. JD Sports bought-in during 2022, acquiring a 60% stake.

== Personal bests and records held ==
Long course (50 m)

Event	Time		Date	Meet	Location	Ref
200 m freestyle	1:56.66		5 April 2008	British Championships	Sheffield, United Kingdom	
400 m freestyle	4:00.79		26 July 2009	2009 World Championships	Rome, Italy	
800 m freestyle	8:14.10	NR	16 August 2008	Olympic Games	Beijing, China	

Short course (25 m)

Event	Time	Date	Meet	Location	Ref
400 m freestyle	3:59.04	18 December 2009	Duel in the Pool	Manchester, United Kingdom	
800 m freestyle	8:08.25	10 April 2008	World SC Championships	Manchester, United Kingdom	

Legend: WR – World record; ER – European record; CR – Commonwealth record; NR – British record; e – equalled existing record;
Records not set in finals: h – heat; sf – semifinal; r – relay 1st leg; rh – relay heat 1st leg; b – B final; † – en route to final mark; so – swim-off; tt – time trial

== Recognition ==
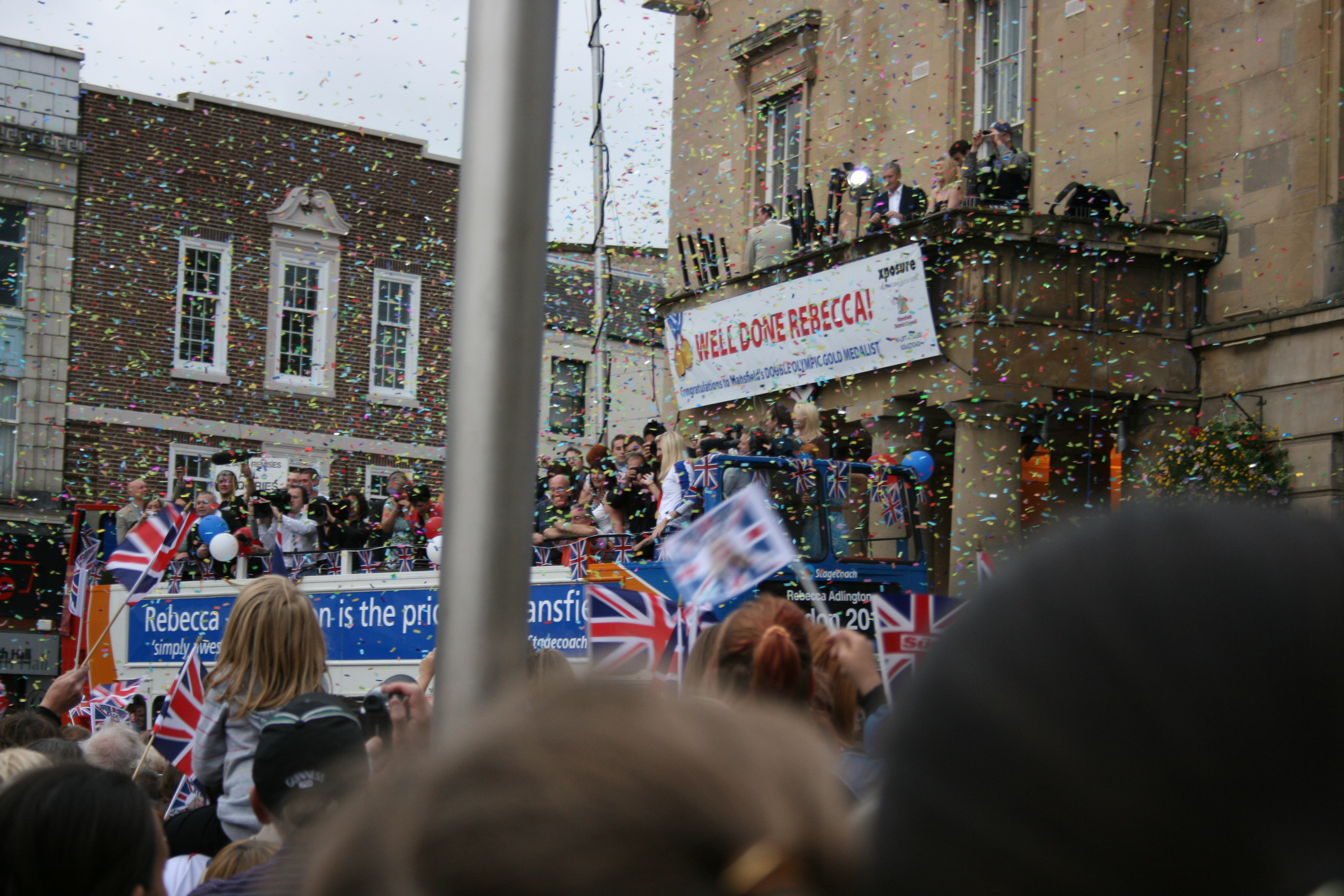
Adlington on an open-top bus outside of Mansfield Town Hall after parading around Mansfield town centre streets in 2008

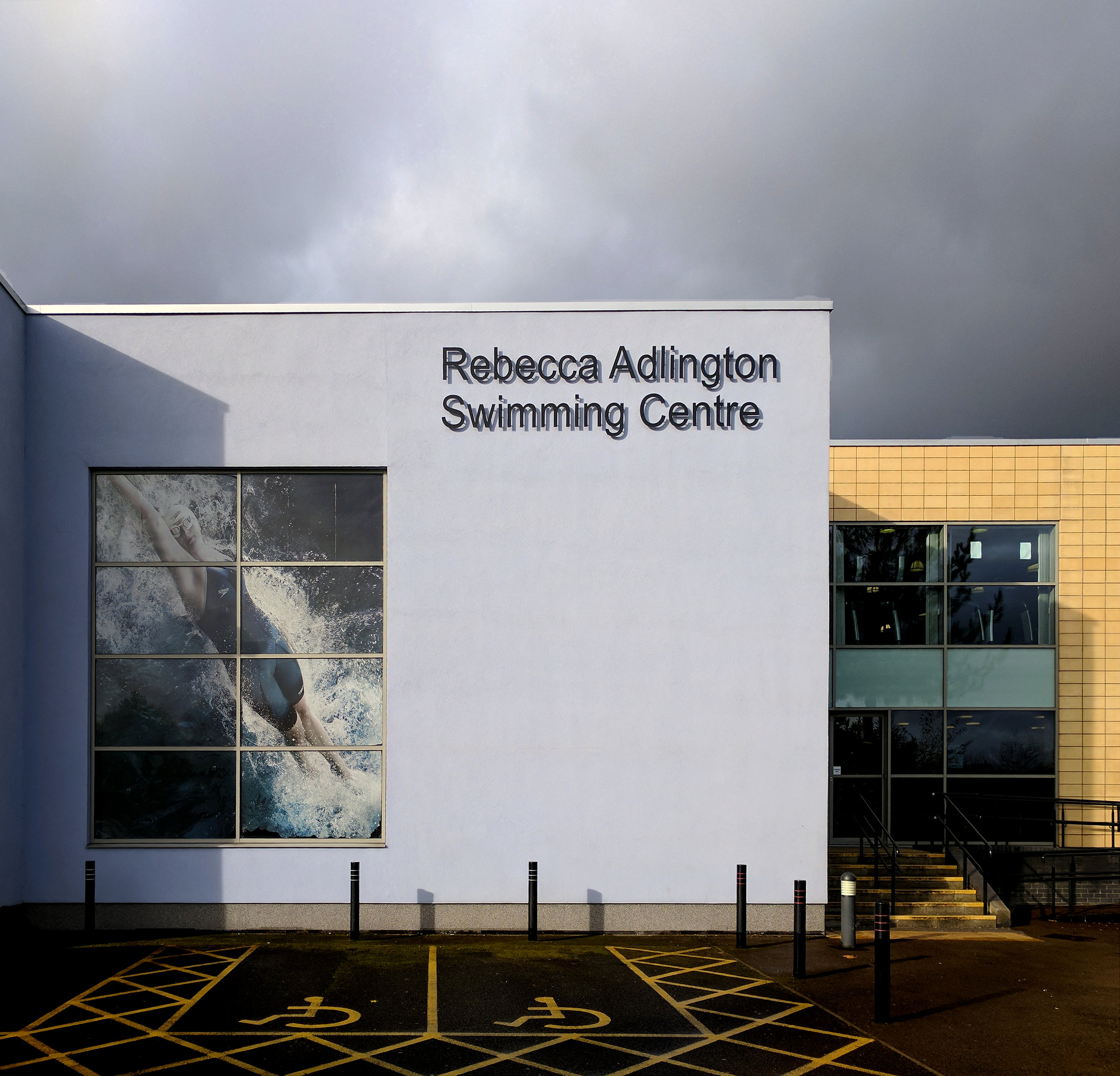
Rebecca Adlington Swimming Centre in November 2017

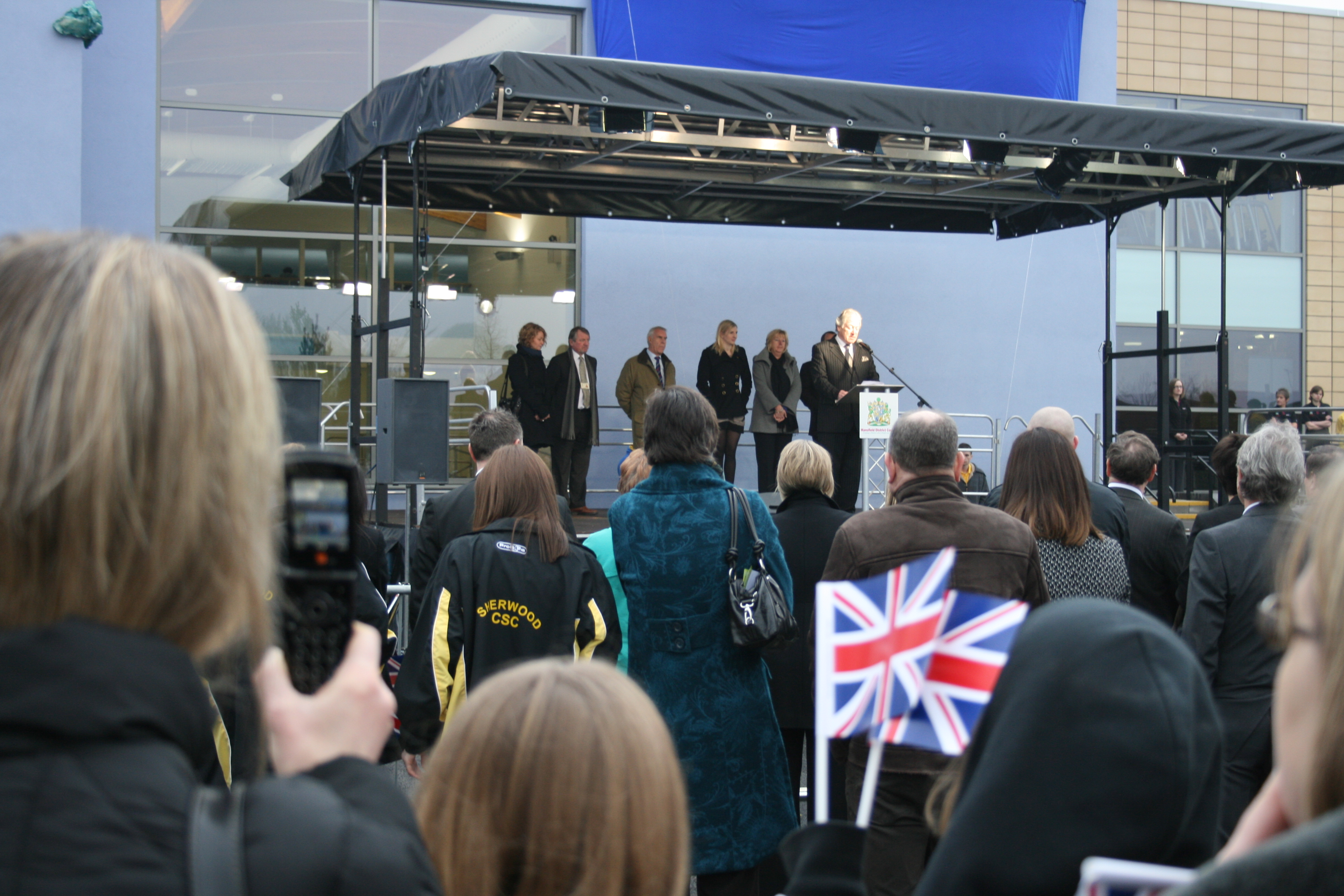
Official opening in 2010 with Adlington and parents looking on as Tony Egginton, then-mayor of Mansfield, addresses spectators

Following the conclusion of the 2008 Summer Olympics, Adlington was welcomed home to Mansfield by the public who lined the streets as she passed by in an open top bus, before appearing at a ceremony at the Old Town Hall. At Mansfield's Civic Centre headquarters, Adlington was presented with a pair of gold-coloured Jimmy Choo shoes by Tony Egginton, then the Mayor of Mansfield.

In November 2008, Adlington was named as the Sports Journalists' Association's Sportswoman of the Year, receiving her trophy at a ceremony in London from Princess Anne, herself a former winner of the award. On 14 December 2008, she was voted third in the BBC Sports Personality of the Year award. She was named European Swimmer of the Year by Swimming World Magazine, and in 2009, she was awarded the Laureus World Breakthrough of the Year award.

Adlington was appointed Officer of the Order of the British Empire in the 2009 New Year Honours list, which she received from Queen Elizabeth II at Buckingham Palace in June 2009. In December that year, she received an honorary Master of Arts degree from the University of Nottingham in recognition of her outstanding contribution to British sport. Also that year, a Class 395 high-speed train operated by Southeastern was named after her.

The Sherwood Swimming Baths in Adlington's hometown of Mansfield, where she swam as a child, was renamed the Rebecca Adlington Swimming Centre in January 2010. The Yates Bar in Mansfield was briefly renamed the Adlington Arms, and the 2012 Olympic torch relay passed by the Rebecca Adlington Swimming Centre. Following her retirement from competition in 2013, Adlington was named as the inaugural inductee into Nottinghamshire County Council's Roll of Honour. In 2016, Tram 231 on the Nottingham Tram system was named after her, and she was inducted into the International Swimming Hall of Fame.

== In the media ==
Adlington appeared in the music video for the Sport Relief charity single "Proud" by JLS. She participated in the thirteenth series of I'm a Celebrity...Get Me Out of Here!, which began airing in November 2013. She was the seventh celebrity voted out by the public. Adlington was a guest panellist on the ITV chat show Loose Women for the first time on 25 March 2014. She was a contestant in the 2016 series of The Jump, but withdrew after dislocating her shoulder during training.

Adlington worked for the BBC as a swimming pundit at the 2014 Commonwealth Games. She repeated this role at the 2016 Summer Olympics, the 2018 Commonwealth Games, the 2020 Summer Olympics, the 2022 Commonwealth Games, and the 2024 Summer Olympics.

Adlington has also appeared on: All Star Family Fortunes (18 September 2010), A League of Their Own (2 November 2012), I Love My Country (September 2013), Celebrity Come Dine with Me (2013 Christmas Special), Who Wants to Be a Millionaire? (December 2013), The Chase: Celebrity Special (28 December 2013), A Question of Sport: Super Saturday (July 2014), 8 Out of 10 Cats (13 October 2014), Desert Island Discs (June 2015), Celebrity MasterChef (August 2017), and Celebrity Antiques Road Trip (December 2020).

== Personal life ==
In 2005, Adlington's sister was affected by encephalitis, an inflammation of the brain. Her sister recovered over time, but its impact inspired Adlington to say in 2012: "It made me more determined. It makes me train harder". Adlington became an Ambassador of the Encephalitis Society in 2009, to help raise awareness of the illness. Her great-uncle was footballer Terry Adlington, a former goalkeeper with Derby County. As a result, she is a Derby County supporter.

In 2009, comedian Frankie Boyle was censured by the BBC Trust's Editorial Standards Committee for breaching guidelines, after making remarks that the committee called "offensive and unacceptable for broadcast" during a 2008 edition of TV show Mock The Week, when he jibed at Adlington's appearance. Adlington's agent said that the BBC's rebuke was insufficient.

In 2014, Adlington married former swimmer Harry Needs. The couple had a daughter together, born in June 2015. In March 2016, Adlington announced her separation from Needs. In March 2021, Adlington and her partner, announced the birth of their son. The couple married in August that year. In August 2022, she suffered a miscarriage and underwent emergency surgery. In October 2023, Adlington wrote on social media that she had suffered another miscarriage at the time of her 20 week scan. In 2025, she said she had been diagnosed with Coeliac disease. In March 2026, Adlington announced the birth of her daughter.

== See also ==
- List of Olympic medalists in swimming (women)
- List of World Aquatics Championships medalists in swimming (women)
- List of Commonwealth Games medallists in swimming (women)
- World record progression 800 metres freestyle

== Notes ==
Records
Preceded by Janet Evans	Women's 800 metres freestyle world record holder (long course); 16 August 2008 – 3 August 2013	Succeeded by Katie Ledecky
Awards
Preceded by Laure Manaudou	European Swimmer of the Year; 2008	Succeeded by Federica Pellegrini
Preceded by Lewis Hamilton	Laureus World Sports; Breakthrough of the Year; 2009	Succeeded by Jenson Button
