= Simona Marinova =

Macedonian swimmer

Personal information
- Born: 2 July 1994 (age 31) Skopje, Macedonia
- Height: 175 cm (5 ft 9 in)
- Weight: 68 kg (150 lb)

Sport
- Sport: Swimming

Simona Marinova (born 2 July 1994) is a Macedonian swimmer. At the 2012 Summer Olympics, she competed in the women's 800 metre freestyle, finishing in 35th place overall in the heats, failing to qualify for the final.
