= Alessia Filippi =

Italian swimmer (born 1987)

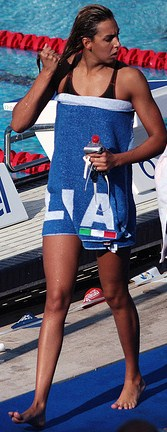
- Filippi at the 2009 World Aquatics Championships.

Personal information
- Nationality: Italy
- Born: 23 June 1987 (age 39) Rome, Italy
- Height: 1.86 m (6 ft 1 in)
- Weight: 63 kg (139 lb)
- Website: AlessiaFilippi.it

Sport
- Sport: Swimming
- Strokes: Freestyle, Backstroke and medley
- Club: Aurelia Nuoto
Medal record
Event	1st	2nd	3rd
Olympic Games	0	1	0
World Championships (LC)	1	0	1
World Championships (SC)	0	1	0
European Championships (LC)	3	0	2
European Championships (SC)	3	1	2
Mediterranean Games	5	0	3
Total	12	3	8
Olympic Games
Silver medal – second place	2008 Beijing	800 m freestyle
World Championships (LC)
Gold medal – first place	2009 Rome	1500 m freestyle
Bronze medal – third place	2009 Rome	800 m freestyle
World Championships (SC)
Silver medal – second place	2006 Shanghai	400 m medley
European Championships (LC)
Gold medal – first place	2006 Budapest	400 m medley
Gold medal – first place	2008 Eindhoven	400 m medley
Gold medal – first place	2008 Eindhoven	800 m freestyle
Bronze medal – third place	2006 Budapest	200 m medley
Bronze medal – third place	2008 Eindhoven	4×200 m freestyle
European Championships (SC)
Gold medal – first place	2006 Helsinki	400 m medley
Gold medal – first place	2007 Debrecen	400 m medley
Gold medal – first place	2008 Rijeka	800 m freestyle
Silver medal – second place	2008 Rijeka	400 m medley
Bronze medal – third place	2007 Debrecen	800 m freestyle
Bronze medal – third place	2008 Rijeka	400 m freestyle
Mediterranean Games
Gold medal – first place	2005 Almería	200 m backstroke
Gold medal – first place	2005 Almería	400 m medley
Gold medal – first place	2009 Pescara	800 m freestyle
Gold medal – first place	2009 Pescara	200 m backstroke
Gold medal – first place	2009 Pescara	4 × 200 m freestyle
Bronze medal – third place	2005 Almería	200 m medley
Bronze medal – third place	2005 Almería	4×200 m freestyle
Bronze medal – third place	2005 Almería	4×100 m medley

Alessia Filippi (born 23 June 1987 in Rome) is a retired Italian swimmer.

Filippi won the gold medal in the 1500 m at the 2009 World Championships in Rome.

== Biography ==
Filippi excels in backstroke and individual medley races, as well as in middle-distance freestyle (400 to 1500 m).

She won 400 m individual medley at the 2006 European Swimming Championships in Budapest. She also won a bronze medal in the same championship, and a silver medal in the 2006 short-course World Championships. In December 2006 she confirmed her title at the 2006 short-course European Championships in Helsinki. In July 2008 she broke the European record in the 1500 m freestyle (long course). After winning two gold medals in the 2008 European Aquatics Championships in Eindhoven earlier that year. She became champion in the 400 m individual medley and the 800 m freestyle.

On 12 December 2008, at the 2008 European Short Course Swimming Championships held in Rijeka, she set the new world record in the 800 m freestyle (short course), with the time of 8:04.53.

=== Retirement ===
On 12 October 2012, at the age of 25 years, she announced her retirement from competitions.

== Personal bests ==
She currently holds 1 World record (marked as WR), 3 European records (ER) and 12 Italian records (IR). Her personal bests (as of the 25 April 2009) are:

Event	Long course (year)	Short course (year)
200 m freestyle	1:58.42 (2008)	1:59.40 (2008)
400 m freestyle	4:07.15 (2009)	3:59.35 (2008) IR
800 m freestyle	8:17.21 (2009) IR	8:04.53 (2008) WR
1500 m freestyle	15:44.93 (2009) ER	16:14.3 (2006)
100 m backstroke	1:01.52 (2006)	1:01.25 (2006)
200 m backstroke	2:08.44 (2009) IR	2:04.55 (2009) IR
200 m individual medley	2:13.08 (2007)	2:11.69 (2008)
400 m individual medley	4:34.34 (2008) IR	4:26.06 (2008) IR
4 × 100 m freestyle relay		3:39.18 (2006) IR
4 × 200 m freestyle relay	7:49.76 (2008) ER	7:50.39 (2006) IR
4 × 100 m medley relay	4:04.90 (2008) IR	

== See also ==
- Italian swimmers multiple medalists at the international competitions
- World record progression 800 metres freestyle

Records
Preceded by Kate Ziegler	Women's 800 metre freestyle world record holder (short course); 12 December 2008 – present	Succeeded by Incumbent
