= Wendy Trott =

South African swimmer (born 1990)

Personal information
- Full name: Wendy Trott
- National team: South Africa
- Born: 14 February 1990 (age 36) Sandton, Johannesburg, South Africa

Sport
- Sport: Swimming
- Strokes: Freestyle
- College team: University of Georgia

Wendy Trott (born 14 February 1990) is a South African swimmer. She competed at the 2008 Summer Olympics in the Women's 400 and Women's 800 metre freestyle, finishing 9th in the latter and the 2012 Summer Olympics in the Women's 400 and Women's 800 metre freestyle, finishing 12th in the latter.

She is currently working at a global philanthropic organizations Luminate Group.

== See also ==
- List of University of Georgia people
- List of Commonwealth Games medallists in swimming (women)
