= Lotte Friis =

Danish swimmer

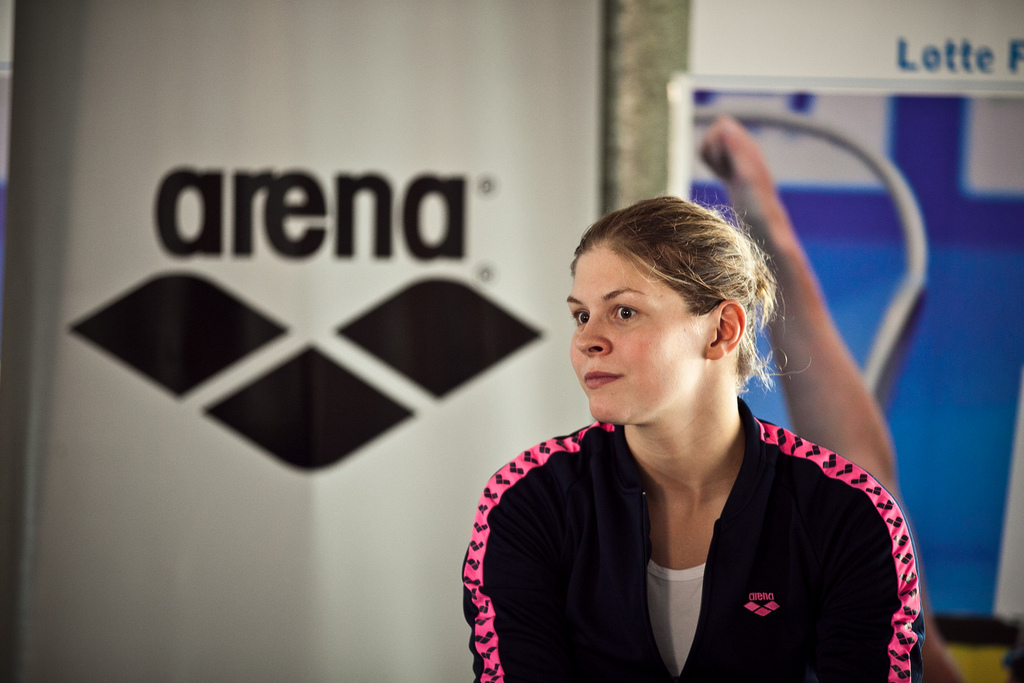
- Friis in 2011

Personal information
- Full name: Lotte Friis
- National team: Denmark
- Born: 9 February 1988 (age 38) Blovstrød, Denmark
- Height: 1.84 m (6 ft 0 in)
- Weight: 72 kg (159 lb)

Sport
- Sport: Swimming
- Strokes: Freestyle
- Club: Gentofte Svømmeklub; North Baltimore Aquatic Club
Medal record
Women's swimming
Representing Denmark
Olympic Games
Bronze medal – third place	2008 Beijing	800 m freestyle
World Championships (LC)
Gold medal – first place	2009 Rome	800 m freestyle
Gold medal – first place	2011 Shanghai	1500 m freestyle
Silver medal – second place	2009 Rome	1500 m freestyle
Silver medal – second place	2011 Shanghai	800 m freestyle
Silver medal – second place	2013 Barcelona	800 m freestyle
Silver medal – second place	2013 Barcelona	1500 m freestyle
World Championships (SC)
Silver medal – second place	2012 Istanbul	800 m freestyle
European Championships (LC)
Gold medal – first place	2010 Budapest	800 m freestyle
Gold medal – first place	2010 Budapest	1500 m freestyle
Bronze medal – third place	2010 Budapest	400 m freestyle
Bronze medal – third place	2008 Eindhoven	1500 m freestyle
European Championships (SC)
Gold medal – first place	2011 Szczecin	800 m freestyle
Gold medal – first place	2009 Istanbul	800 m freestyle
Gold medal – first place	2007 Debrecen	800 m freestyle
Gold medal – first place	2012 Chartres	800 m freestyle
Silver medal – second place	2011 Szczecin	400 m freestyle
Silver medal – second place	2009 Istanbul	400 m freestyle
Silver medal – second place	2004 Vienna	800 m freestyle
Silver medal – second place	2012 Chartres	400 m freestyle
Silver medal – second place	2013 Herning	400 m freestyle
Silver medal – second place	2013 Herning	800 m freestyle
Bronze medal – third place	2008 Rijeka	800 m freestyle

Lotte Friis (born 9 February 1988) is a Danish competitive swimmer from Allerød Municipality.

== Career ==
Friis was born in Blovstrød. Finishing third in the 1500 metre freestyle competition at the European Championships 2008 in Eindhoven she won her first major long course medal. At the 2008 Summer Olympics in Beijing, she won bronze in the 800 metre freestyle competition. At the 2009 World Championships she won silver in the 1500 metre freestyle competition and gold in the 800 metre freestyle competition with the second fastest time ever and a new championship record. At the 2011 World Aquatics Championships in Shanghai Friis won gold in the women's 1500 metre freestyle in the time 15:49.59 and silver in the women's 800 metre freestyle. Friis participated in the women's 400 metre freestyle and reached the final. She finished in fifth in a time of 4:04.68, which was a new Nordic record.

== See also ==
- World record progression 1500 metres freestyle

Awards and achievements
Preceded by Denmark men's national handball team	Danish Sports Name of the Year; 2009	Succeeded by Caroline Wozniacki
