= Erika Villaécija =

Spanish swimmer

Personal information
- Full name: Erika Villaécija García
- Nationality: Spain
- Born: 2 June 1984 (age 42) Barcelona, Spain
- Height: 1.77 m (5 ft 10 in)
- Weight: 61 kg (134 lb)

Sport
- Sport: Swimming
- Strokes: Freestyle
- Club: C.N. Hospitalet (2008); C.N. Sant Andreu (2009)
Medal record
Women's swimming
Representing Spain
European Championships
Gold medal – first place	2004 Madrid	800 m freestyle
Gold medal – first place	2004 Madrid	4×200 m freestyle
Silver medal – second place	2002 Berlin	4×200 m freestyle
Silver medal – second place	2008 Eindhoven	800 m freestyle
Silver medal – second place	2008 Eindhoven	1500 m freestyle
Bronze medal – third place	2010 Budapest	1500 m freestyle
Bronze medal – third place	2012 Debrecen	1500 m freestyle
Mediterranean Games
Gold medal – first place	2001 Tunis	800 m freestyle
Gold medal – first place	2005 Almería	800 m freestyle
Silver medal – second place	2005 Almería	1500 m freestyle
Silver medal – second place	2005 Almería	4×100 m freestyle
Silver medal – second place	2005 Almería	4×200 m freestyle
Short Course Worlds
Gold medal – first place	2010 Dubai	800 m freestyle
Bronze medal – third place	2008 Manchester	800 m freestyle
Short Course Europeans
Gold medal – first place	2003 Dublin	800 m freestyle
Silver medal – second place	2007 Debrecen	800 m freestyle
Silver medal – second place	2009 Istanbul	800 m freestyle
Silver medal – second place	2011 Szczecin	800 m freestyle
Bronze medal – third place	2004 Vienna	400 m freestyle
Bronze medal – third place	2004 Vienna	800 m freestyle
Bronze medal – third place	2006 Helsinki	800 m freestyle

Erika Villaécija García (Note: In this Spanish name, the first or paternal surname is Villaécija and the second or maternal family name is García.) (born 2 June 1984 in Barcelona, Spain), known as Erika Villaécija, is a three-time Olympic swimmer from Spain. She swam at the 2004, 2008 and 2012 Olympic team. And she has qualified for the 2016 Olympic team.

As of June 2009, she holds the Spanish Records in the long course 400, 800 and 1500 freestyles.

== 2012 Summer Olympics ==
2012 Summer Olympics Events
Event	Time	Place
800 m freestyle	8:27.99	10
10 km open water	1-58:49.5	7
