= Chloe Sutton =

American swimmer

Chloe Sutton Mackey
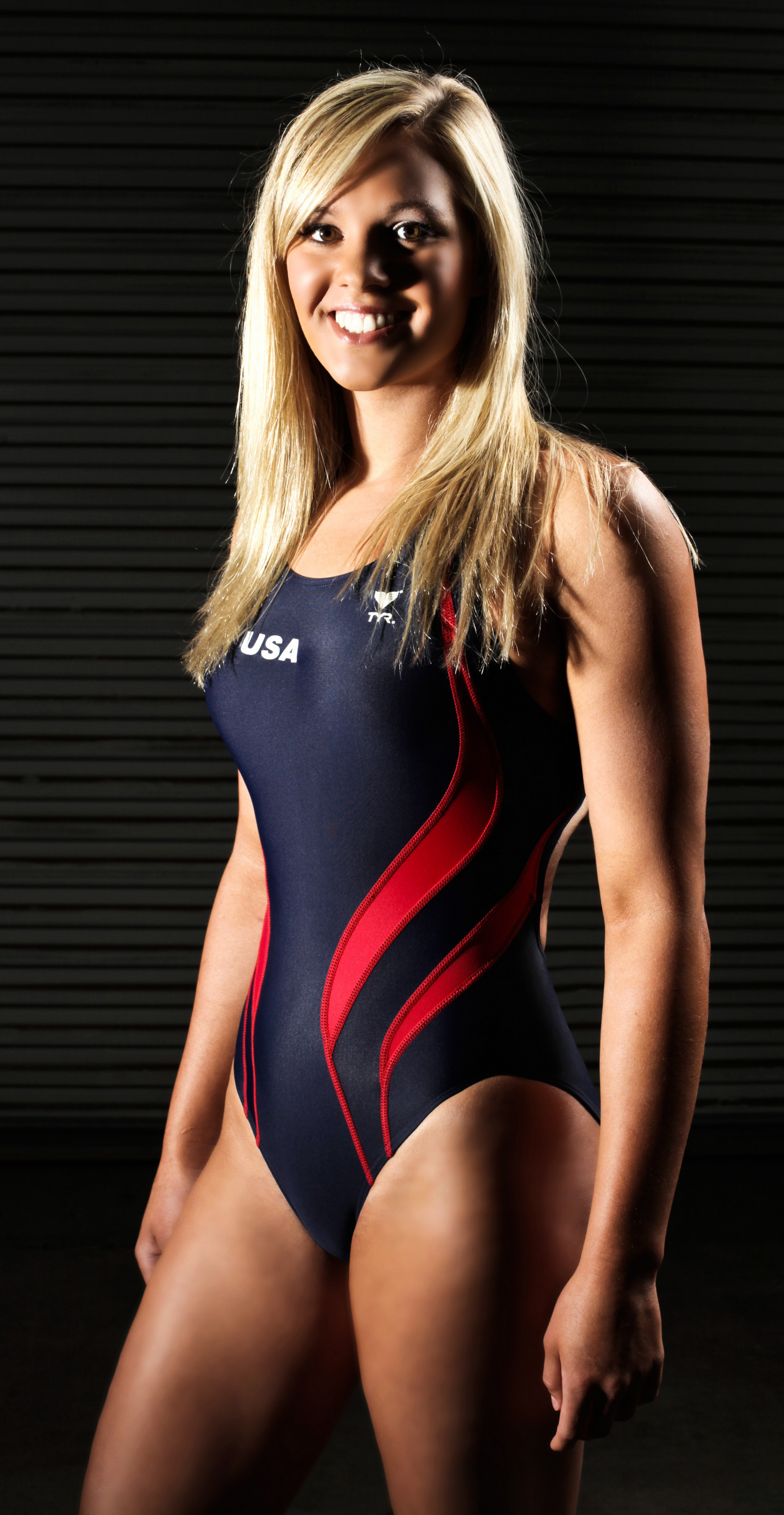
- Chloe Sutton in 2010

Personal information
- Full name: Chloe Elizabeth Sutton Mackey
- National team: United States
- Born: Chloe Elizabeth Sutton; February 3, 1992 (age 34) Vandenberg Air Force Base, California, U.S.
- Height: 5 ft 8 in (173 cm)
- Weight: 146 lb (66 kg)
- Spouse: Jacob Mackey (2019–present)

Sport
- Sport: Swimming
- Strokes: Freestyle
- Club: SEAL Innovation Team
Medal record
Women's swimming
Representing the United States
World Championships (SC)
Silver medal – second place	2012 Istanbul	400 m freestyle
Bronze medal – third place	2012 Istanbul	800 m freestyle
World Open Water Championships
Bronze medal – third place	2008 Seville	5 km open water
Pan American Games
Gold medal – first place	2007 Rio	10 km open water
Pan Pacific Championships
Gold medal – first place	2006 Victoria	10 km open water
Gold medal – first place	2010 Irvine	400 m freestyle
Silver medal – second place	2010 Irvine	800 m freestyle

Chloe Elizabeth Sutton Mackey (born February 3, 1992) is an American retired competition swimmer who specialized in freestyle and long-distance events. Sutton represented the United States at two consecutive Olympic Games. Sutton has won a total of five medals in major international competition, three gold, one silver, and one bronze spanning the Open Water Championships, Pan Pacific Championships, and Pan American Games. She was a member of the 2012 United States Olympic team, and competed in the 400-meter freestyle at the 2012 Summer Olympics.

== Biography ==
Sutton was born on Vandenberg Air Force Base (near Lompoc, California) in 1992, to David and Wendy Sutton; her parents also had a son, Colin, a few years later. Wendy was a pharmaceutical sales rep and model from Chicago. David, a U.S. Air Force officer, was in the Pentagon at the time of the September 11 attacks; he formerly played football for the U.S. Air Force Academy. Chloe's adored "little" brother Colin, who ultimately grew to 6'5" and 285 pounds, played football for the University of Colorado; he currently enjoys a career in finance.

Sutton swam on the Sequoia Farms Stingrays summer swim team in Centreville, Virginia from 1998 to 2000.

Bypassing her college eligibility, Chloe became a professional swimmer on December 22, 2009 during the annual Elite Pro-AM Meet held in Oklahoma City. In 2010, Sutton graduated from high school through the University of Nebraska Independent Study Program. In 2015 Chloe graduated with her bachelor's degree in Communications.

On September 15, 2019, Chloe married Jacob Mackey in Sedalia, Colorado. They now live in Reno, Nevada. The couple welcomed their first child, son Andrew, in October 2020; Andrew is named after his maternal grandfather, David Andrew Sutton.

== Career ==
As an open water swimmer, Sutton is a three-time medalist, and is a two-time medalist in the swimming pool. She won the first international medal of her career at the 2006 Pan Pacific Swimming Championships, winning the 10-kilometer open water event. The following year, at the 2007 Pan American Games, she won gold in the same event.

At the 2008 FINA World Open Water Swimming Championships, Sutton won the bronze medal in the women's 5-kilometer open water event, finishing behind Russians Larisa Ilchenko and Ekaterina Seliverstova. Sutton qualified for the 2008 Summer Olympics in Beijing at the test event in Beijing by beating compatriot Kirsten Groome. At the Olympics, Sutton finished the 10 km event in twenty-second place with a time of 2:02:13.6.

In 2009, Sutton qualified for the 2009 World Aquatics Championships by finishing second in the 400-meter freestyle and first in the 800-meter freestyle at the 2009 National Championships. At the 2009 World Aquatics Championships, Sutton's best performance was eighth place in the 1,500-meter freestyle.

At the 2010 National Championships, the selection meet for the 2010 Pan Pacific Swimming Championships and the 2011 World Aquatics Championships, Sutton placed eighth in the 200-meter freestyle, third in the 400-meter freestyle, and first in the 800-meter freestyle. At the 2010 Pan Pacific Swimming Championships, Sutton won gold in the 400-meter freestyle and silver in the 800-meter freestyle, the first medals of her career in the pool. Sutton also competed in the 10-kilometer open water event, but was disqualified.

At the end of 2010, Sutton competed at the 2010 FINA Short Course World Championships in Dubai, but finished out of medal contention. She placed fourth in the 400-meter freestyle and seventh in the 800-meter freestyle.

In June 2012, Sutton became the first American to make Olympic swimming teams in both open water and pool events. At the 2012 United States Olympic Trials, she earned a spot for the U.S. Olympic team in the 400-meter freestyle to go along with her 2008 Olympic appearance in the open water event. In the 400-meter freestyle final, Sutton placed second behind Allison Schmitt. She also competed in the 800-meter freestyle and finished fourth in the final. At the 2012 Summer Olympics in London, she finished tenth in the preliminary heats of the 400-meter freestyle, and was not among the top eight to advance to the final.

On February 3, 2015, during her 23rd birthday, she announced her retirement from swimming.

== Personal bests (long course) ==
As of June 25, 2013.

Event	Time	Venue	Date
200 m freestyle	1:59.38	Columbia	February 18, 2011
400 m freestyle	4:04.18	Omaha	June 26, 2012
800 m freestyle	8:23.24	Indianapolis	June 25, 2013
1500 m freestyle	16:07.83	Charlotte	May 9, 2013

== See also ==
- List of United States records in swimming
