= Melissa Gorman =

Australian swimmer (born 1985)

Personal information
- Full name: Melissa Anne Gorman
- Nickname: "Mel"
- National team: Australia
- Born: 11 December 1985 (age 40) Sydney
- Died: 1940
- Height: 1.80 m (5 ft 11 in)
- Weight: 65 kg (143 lb)

Sport
- Sport: Swimming
- Strokes: Freestyle
- Club: Redcliffe Leagues SC
- Coach: Ken Wood
Medal record
Women's swimming
Representing Australia
World Championships (LC)
Gold medal – first place	2009 Rome	5 km open water
Silver medal – second place	2011 Shanghai	5 km team
World Championships (SC)
Bronze medal – third place	2004 Indianapolis	800 m freestyle
World Open Water Championships
Bronze medal – third place	2010 Roberval	10 km open water
Pan Pacific Championships
Gold medal – first place	2010 Irvine	1500 m freestyle
Bronze medal – third place	2010 Irvine	10 km open water
Commonwealth Games
Silver medal – second place	2006 Melbourne	800 m freestyle
Bronze medal – third place	2010 Delhi	800 m freestyle

Melissa Anne Gorman (born 11 December 1985) is an Australian long-distance swimmer who specialises in long-distance freestyle and open-water events.

== Career ==
At the 2006 Commonwealth Games, Gorman won a silver medal in the 800 m freestyle.

At the 2008 Summer Olympics, Gorman finished 15th in the Women's 10 km open water marathon and 17th in the 800 m freestyle.

At the 2009 World Aquatics Championships, Gorman stunned Olympic champion Larisa Ilchenko to win gold in the women's 5 km.

At the 2010 Commonwealth Games, Gorman won a bronze medal in the 800 m freestyle.

At the 2010 Pan Pacific Swimming Championships, Gorman won a gold medal in the women's 1500 m freestyle and set a new Commonwealth record.

At the 2012 Summer Olympics, Gorman finished 10th in the women's 10 km open water marathon.

== See also ==
- List of World Aquatics Championships medalists in swimming (women)
- List of Commonwealth Games medallists in swimming (women)
