= Savannah King (swimmer) =

Canadian swimmer (born 1992)

Savannah King OLY
Personal information
- Full name: Savannah King
- National team: Canada
- Born: June 4, 1992 (age 34) Scarborough, Ontario
- Height: 1.78 m (5 ft 10 in)
- Weight: 67 kg (148 lb)

Sport
- Sport: Swimming
- Strokes: Freestyle
- College team: University of British Columbia
Medal record
Women's swimming
Representing Canada
Pan American Games
Silver medal – second place	2007 Rio de Janeiro	4x200 m freestyle
Bronze medal – third place	2007 Rio de Janeiro	800 m freestyle

Savannah King (born June 4, 1992) is a Canadian former competition swimmer who competed primarily in freestyle events. She claimed a bronze medal in the 800-metre freestyle at the 2007 Pan American Games in Rio de Janeiro, Brazil. She also won a silver medal in the 4x200-metre freestyle relay by participating in the preliminary heats.

She made her Olympic debut at the 2008 Summer Olympics in Beijing, China. In the 2009 Canadian Spring Nationals in Toronto, King broke the Canadian national records in both the 800-metre freestyle and the 1500-metre freestyle in a 25-metre short course pool with times of 8:19.99 and 16:00.68 respectively. That summer she swam at the 2009 World Aquatics Championships in Rome, Italy, with a best placing of 20th in the 400-metre freestyle. Most recently, King broke the Canadian record and CIS record in the 400-metre freestyle at the 2012 CIS Championships in Montreal with a time of 4:02.76. At the 2012 Olympic Trials in Montreal, Savannah qualified for the 400-meter freestyle with a second-place finish (4:07:02), swimming under the Canadian record time held by Brittney Reimer. Savannah also won the 800-metre free (8:30:79) coming well under the FINA A standard. Her objective at the trials was to qualify for two individual distance events at the London 2012 Olympics.

She was an All-Canadian swimmer at the University of British Columbia in Vancouver, British Columbia, and earned her bachelor's degree there in 2016. She earned her master's degree in biomechanics and kinesiology from McGill University in Montreal, Quebec, in 2019, and joined the coaching staff of McGill's swim team. She became a full-time assistant coach at McGill in 2022.
