= Marathon swimming at the 2008 Summer Olympics =

Marathon swimming at the Games of the XXIX Olympiad
- Venue: Shunyi Olympic Rowing-Canoeing Park
- Dates: 20–21 August 2008
- Competitors: 50 from 28 nations

The 2008 Summer Games saw the introduction of the aquatic discipline of marathon swimming. The newly introduced open water marathon events (10 km) were held on 20 and 21 August 2008 at Shunyi Olympic Rowing-Canoeing Park.

There were two events, one for men and one for women.

== Event schedule ==
The women's event took place on 20 August, followed by the men's event on 21 August. Both events started at 08:00 local time.

== Qualification ==
A nation could qualify up to two marathon swimmers per event, but only 25 swimmers competed in both the men's and women's 10 kilometre races. Those 25 spots were allocated/awarded as follows:

=== Men's 10 km ===
Event	Location	Date	Vacancies	Qualified
2008 Open Water; World Championships	(Spain) Seville	May 3–4, 2008	10	(Russia) Vladimir Dyatchin (United Kingdom) David Davies (Germany) Thomas Lurz (Netherlands) Maarten van der Weijden (Russia) Evgeny Drattsev (Australia) Ky Hurst (United States) Mark Warkentin (Italy) Valerio Cleri (Greece) Spyridon Gianniotis (Belgium) Brian Ryckeman
2008 Open Water; World Championships	(Spain) Seville	May 3–4, 2008	Continental; Representation*; 5**	(France) Gilles Rondy (Mexico) Luis Escobar (Egypt) Mohamed El Zanaty (Syria) Saleh Mohammad
			Host Nation= 1	(China) Xin Tong
Olympic Marathon Swim; Qualifier	(China) Beijing	May 31 - Jun 1, 2008	9	(Bulgaria) Petar Stoychev (Hungary) Csaba Gercsák (Czech Republic) Rostislav Vitek (South Africa) Chad Ho (Venezuela) Erwin Maldonado (Brazil) Allan do Carmo (Argentina) Damián Blaum (Spain) Francisco Jose Hervas (Portugal) Arseniy Lavrentyev**
TOTAL			25	

* The first eligible finisher from each of the five Continents at the 2008 Open Water World Championship.
** Since Australia was the only Oceanian country at the 2008 OW WC and the country had a qualifier in the top-10, Oceania did not receive any continental berth and the place redistributed to the Olympic Marathon Swim Qualifier for allocation.

=== Women's 10 km ===
Event	Location	Date	Vacancies	Qualified
2008 Open Water Swimming; World Championships	(Spain) Seville	May 3–4, 2008	10	(Russia) Larisa Ilchenko (United Kingdom) Cassandra Patten (Spain) Yurema Requena (South Africa) Natalie du Toit (Czech Republic) Jana Pechanová (Brazil) Poliana Okimoto (Germany) Angela Maurer (United Kingdom) Keri Anne Payne (France) Aurélie Muller (Brazil) Ana Marcela Cunha
2008 Open Water Swimming; World Championships	(Spain) Seville	May 3–4, 2008	Continental; Representation*; 5**	(Netherlands) Edith van Dijk (China) Fang Yanqiao*** (Venezuela) Andreina Pinto (Australia) Melissa Gorman
			Host Nation= 1***	
Olympic Marathon Swim; Qualifier	(China) Beijing	May 31 - Jun 1, 2008	9	(United States) Chloe Sutton (Italy) Martina Grimaldi (Greece) Marianna Lymperta (Ukraine) Nataliya Samorodina (Chile) Kristel Köbrich (Mexico) Imelda Martinez (Sweden) Eva Berglund (Slovenia) Teja Zupan (Argentina) Antonella Bogarin** (Portugal) Daniela Inacio***
TOTAL			25	

* The first eligible finisher from each of the five continents at the 2008 Open Water World Championships. Basically the top finisher from each continent that was outside the top-10 finishers, and from a country who did not have a finisher in the top-10.
**Because South Africa was the only African country at the championships and they had Natalie du Toit qualify for the Olympics via her top-10 finish at the 2008 Open Water World Championships, the Africa continental berth was not allocated to the other South African entrant in the race. The entry allocation instead was added to those available for awarding at the Olympic Marathon Swim Qualifier.
***The Host Nation allocated entry was only if China did not have someone qualify in another fashion. China's Fang Yanqiao qualified at the 2008 Open Water World Championships via the Asia Continental Representative allocation, and therefore the Host Nation allocated spot became available at the Olympic Marathon Swim Qualifier.
****The Olympic committee of Israel did not approve the participation of Daniel Katzir (men) and Olga Berenseva (women) in the Olympic team, as their results were not good enough to make the national Olympic criteria. Their appeals to court against this decision were denied.

== Participating nations ==
- Argentina (2)
- Australia (2)
- Belgium (1)
- Brazil (3)
- Bulgaria (1)
- Chile (1)
- China (2)
- Czech Republic (2)
- Egypt (1)
- France (2)
- Germany (2)
- Great Britain (3)
- Greece (2)
- Hungary (1)
- Italy (2)
- Mexico (2)
- Netherlands (2)
- Portugal (2)
- Russia (3)
- Slovenia (1)
- South Africa (2)
- Spain (2)
- Sweden (1)
- Switzerland (1)
- Syria (1)
- Ukraine (2)
- United States (2)
- Venezuela (2)

== Medal summary ==
=== Medal table ===
Rank	Nation	Gold	Silver	Bronze	Total
1	Netherlands	1	0	0	1
1	Russia	1	0	0	1
3	Great Britain	0	2	1	3
4	Germany	0	0	1	1
Totals (4 entries)		2	2	2	6

=== Men's events ===
Games	Gold		Silver		Bronze	
10 km open water	Maarten van der Weijden; Netherlands	1:51:51.6	David Davies; Great Britain	1:51:53.1	Thomas Lurz; Germany	1:51:53.6

=== Women's events ===
Games	Gold		Silver		Bronze	
10 km open water	Larisa Ilchenko; Russia	1:59:27.7	Keri-Anne Payne; Great Britain	1:59:29.2	Cassandra Patten; Great Britain	1:59:31.0

== See also ==
- 2008 in swimming
