= 2010 FINA World Open Water Swimming Championships – Women's 10K =

The Women's 10K race at the 2010 FINA World Open Water Swimming Championships was swum on Saturday, July 17, 2010, in Roberval, Quebec, Canada. It was the first event of the 2010 Open Water Worlds.

The race began at 11:30 a.m., and was swum in the Lac Saint-Jean in the city center. 37 women swam the event.

The 10 kilometre distance of the race was reached by completed 4 laps of the 2.5-kilometre course set up for the championships.

== Results ==
All times in hours:minutes:seconds

Place	Swimmer	Country	Time	Notes
1	Martina Grimaldi	Italy	2:05:45.2	
2	Giorgia Consiglio	Italy	2:05:57.4	
3	Melissa Gorman	Australia	2:05:57.9	result reinstated
4	Fang Yanqiao	China	2:05:59.1	
5	Angela Maurer	Germany	2:05:59.2	
6	Ana Marcela Cunha	Brazil	2:05:59.7	
7	Christine Jenning	USA	2:06:01.1	
8	Keri-Anne Payne	Great Britain	2:06:01.4	
9	Erika Villaecija	Spain	2:06:01.5	
10	Linsy Heister	Netherlands	2:06:04.6	
11	Ophélie Aspord	France	2:06:04.8	
12	Alejandra Gonzalez	Mexico	2:06:07.0	
13	Yurema Requena	Spain	2:06:25.8	
14	Jana Pechanová	Czech Republic	2:06:28.5	
15	Cassandra Patten	Great Britain	2:06:39.5	
16	Ekaterina Seliverstova	Russia	2:06:44.2	
17	Cara Baker	New Zealand	2:06:45.8	
18	Zaira Cardenas Hernandez	Mexico	2:06:48.4	
19	Stacey Hansford	Australia	2:07:39.7	
20	Karla Šitić	Croatia	2:08:33.2	
21	Siyu Yan	China	2:08:33.2	
22	Katia Barros Esquivel	Ecuador	2:08:38.2	
23	Nadine Reichert	Germany	2:08:40.1	
24	Olga Beresnyeva	Ukraine	2:08:44.8	
25	Nataly Caldas-Calle	Ecuador	2:08:48.8	
26	Natalie du Toit	South Africa	2:09:00.1	
27	Anastasia Zhidkova	Azerbaijan	2:09:01.0	
28	Nadine Williams	Canada	2:10:05.8	
29	Inha Kotsur	Azerbaijan	2:12:16.8	
--	Eva Fabian	USA	DQ	
--	Poliana Okimoto	Brazil	DQ	
--	Aurélie Muller	France	DQ	
--	Marianna Lymperta	Greece	DQ	
--	Kalliopi Araouzou	Greece	DNF	
--	Teja Zupan	Slovenia	DNF	
--	Zsofia Balazs	Canada	DNF	
--	Manon Lammens	Belgium	DNF	

=== Gorman disqualification ===
During the race Australia's Melissa Gorman was disqualified (DQ'd) for unsportsmanlike conduct. Three days later, on Tuesday, July 20, 2010, following a protest of her DQ by Swimming Australia, FINA overturned Gorman's DQ, reinstating her result which placed her in third. This moved China's FANG Yanqiao (and the rest of the finishers below them) down one place; Fang moving from third to fourth. France's Aurélie Muller's similar DQ for unsportsmanlike conduct was also reviewed; however, her disqualification was not overturned.
