= Open water swimming at the 2009 World Aquatics Championships – Women's 10 km =

Women's 10 km at the 2009 World Aquatics Championships
- Location: Rome
- Dates: 22 July
- Competitors: 45 from 26 nations

The women's 10K (10 kilometer) race at the 2009 World Championships occurred on Wednesday, 22 July at Ostia Beach in Rome, Italy. In total, 45 women from 26 countries competed in the race.

== Results ==
Rank	Swimmer	Nationality	Time
1st place, gold medalist(s)	Keri-Anne Payne	(United Kingdom) Great Britain	2:01:37.1
2nd place, silver medalist(s)	Ekaterina Seliverstova	Russia	2:01:38.0
3rd place, bronze medalist(s)	Martina Grimaldi	Italy	2:01:38.6
4	Andreina Pinto	Venezuela	2:01:40.8
5	Angela Maurer	Germany	2:01:40.9
6	Linsy Heister	Netherlands	2:01:41.0
7	Poliana Okimoto	Brazil	2:01:41.5
8	Margarita Dominguez	Spain	2:01:45.6
9	Marianna Lymperta	Greece	2:01:45.7
10	Jana Pechanová	Czech Republic	2:01:50.2
11	Alona Berbasova	Ukraine	2:01:58.9
12	Manon Lammens	Belgium	2:02:00.3
13	Alannah Jury	New Zealand	2:02:01.0
14	Teja Zupan	Slovenia	2:02:03.1
15	Fang Yanqiao	China	2:02:04.0
16	Olga Beresneva	Ukraine	2:02:04.0
17	Nika Kozamernik	Slovenia	2:02:04.4
18	Karla Šitić	Croatia	2:02:04.5
18	Odette Saldivar	Mexico	2:02:04.5
20	Iris Matthey-Jaquet	Switzerland	2:02:04.6
21	Patricia Maldonado	Venezuela	2:02:05.9
22	Ana Marcela Cunha	Brazil	2:02:06.4
23	Silvie Rybarova	Czech Republic	2:02:06.5
24	Emily Brunemann	USA	2:02:06.6
25	Alejandra Gonzalez	Mexico	2:02:06.7
26	Stefanie Biller	Germany	2:02:07.1
27	Eva Fabian	USA	2:02:09.9
28	Maaike Waaijer	Netherlands	2:02:10.1
29	Melissa Gorman	Australia	2:02:16.0
30	Katia Barros	Ecuador	2:02:20.3
31	Alice Franco	Italy	2:02:22.1
32	Ophélie Aspord	France	2:02:22.9
33	Zsofia Balazs	Canada	2:02:24.3
34	Shi Yu	China	2:02:28.3
35	Katy Whitfield	(United Kingdom) Great Britain	2:02:37.7
36	Danielle de Francesco	Australia	2:02:55.4
37	Yurema Requena Juarez	Spain	2:03:16.8
38	Natalie du Toit	South Africa	2:06:22.5
39	Nataly Caldas Calle	Ecuador	2:06:26.9
40	Wing Yung Natasha Terri Tang	Hong Kong	2:09:15.4
41	Aurélie Muller	France	2:09:23.7
42	Nadine Williams	Canada	2:12:07.9
43	Cindy Toscano	Guatemala	2:26:09.1
--	Larisa Ilchenko	Russia	DNF
--	Swann Gabrielle Oberson	Switzerland	DNF

Key: DNF = Did not finish

== See also ==
- Open water swimming at the 2007 World Aquatics Championships – Women's 10 km
- Swimming at the 2008 Summer Olympics
