= Open water swimming at the 2007 World Aquatics Championships – Women's 10 km =

Women's 10 km at the 2007 World Aquatics Championships
- Venue: St Kilda Beach
- Location: Melbourne
- Dates: 20 March

The Women's 10K open water swimming race at the 2007 World Championships was held on March 20, 2007, at the beach St Kilda.

== Result ==
Place	Name	Country	Time	Points
1	Larisa Ilchenko	Russia	2:03:57.9	18
2	Cassandra Patten	(United Kingdom) Great Britain	2:03:58.9	16
3	Kate Brookes-Peterson	Australia	2:03:59.5	14
4	Angela Maurer	Germany	2:04:00.7	12
5	Ksenia Popova	Russia	2:04:03.7	10
6	Britta Kamrau-Crestein	Germany	2:044:05.8	8
7	Jana Pechanová	Czech Republic	2:04:07.6	6
8	Poliana Okimoto	Brazil	2:04:09.1	5
9	Kalyn Keller	USA	2:04:10.0	4
10	Eva Berglund	Sweden	2:04:13.7	3
11	Keri-Anne Payne	(United Kingdom) Great Britain	2:04:37.5	2
12	Laura la Piana	Italy	2:05:29.8	1
13	Cathy Dietrich	France	2:05:30.6	
14	Alexandra Bagley	Australia	2:05:32.9	
15	Rita Judit Kovacs	Hungary	2:05:36.7	
16	Yurema Requena Juarez	Spain	2:05:52.6	
17	Federica Vitale	Italy	2:05:55.2	
18	Nika Kozamernik	Slovenia	2:07:54.4	
19	Zheng Jing	China	2:07:56.2	
20	Xenia Lopez Rodriguez	Spain	2:08:13.3	
21	Andreina del Valle Perez	Venezuela	2:10:01.7	
22	Natalya Samorodina	Ukraine	2:10:50.3	
23	Alejandra Galan	Mexico	2:10:52.2	
24	Pilar Geijo	Argentina	2:11:06.9	
25	Imelda Martinez	Mexico	2:11:30.4	
26	Ana Marcela Cunha	Brazil	2:13:17.6	
27	Svitlana Rastoropova	Ukraine	2:13:23.5	
28	Chloe Sutton	USA	2:15:00.0	
29	Linsy Heister	Netherlands	2:17:08.4	
30	Caroline Murray	Canada	2:19:22.3	
31	Francis Mishell Tixe Cobos	Ecuador	2:19:24.6	
32	Malwina Bukszowana	Poland	2:19:24.6	
33	Nataly Caldas Calle	Ecuador	2:19:24.6	
34	Michelle Savchenka Santiago	Venezuela	2:19:24.6	
35	Natasha Tang	Hong Kong	2:24:19.8	
36	Anja Trisic	Croatia	2:25:31.4	
	Cindy Toscano Merida	Guatemala	OTL	
	Ana Bukovac	Croatia	DNF	
	Marianne Erdmenger Gutierrez	Guatemala	DNF	
	Klaudia Barsi	Hungary	DNF	
	Tanya Hunks	Canada	DSQ	
	Li Xue	China	DSQ	

== See also ==
- 2005 World Aquatics Championships
- 2006 FINA World Open Water Championships
- 2008 FINA World Open Water Championships
- Open water swimming at the 2009 World Aquatics Championships – Women's 10 km
