= Marathon swimming at the 2012 Summer Olympics – Women's 10 kilometre =

Women's marathon swimming at the Games of the XXX Olympiad
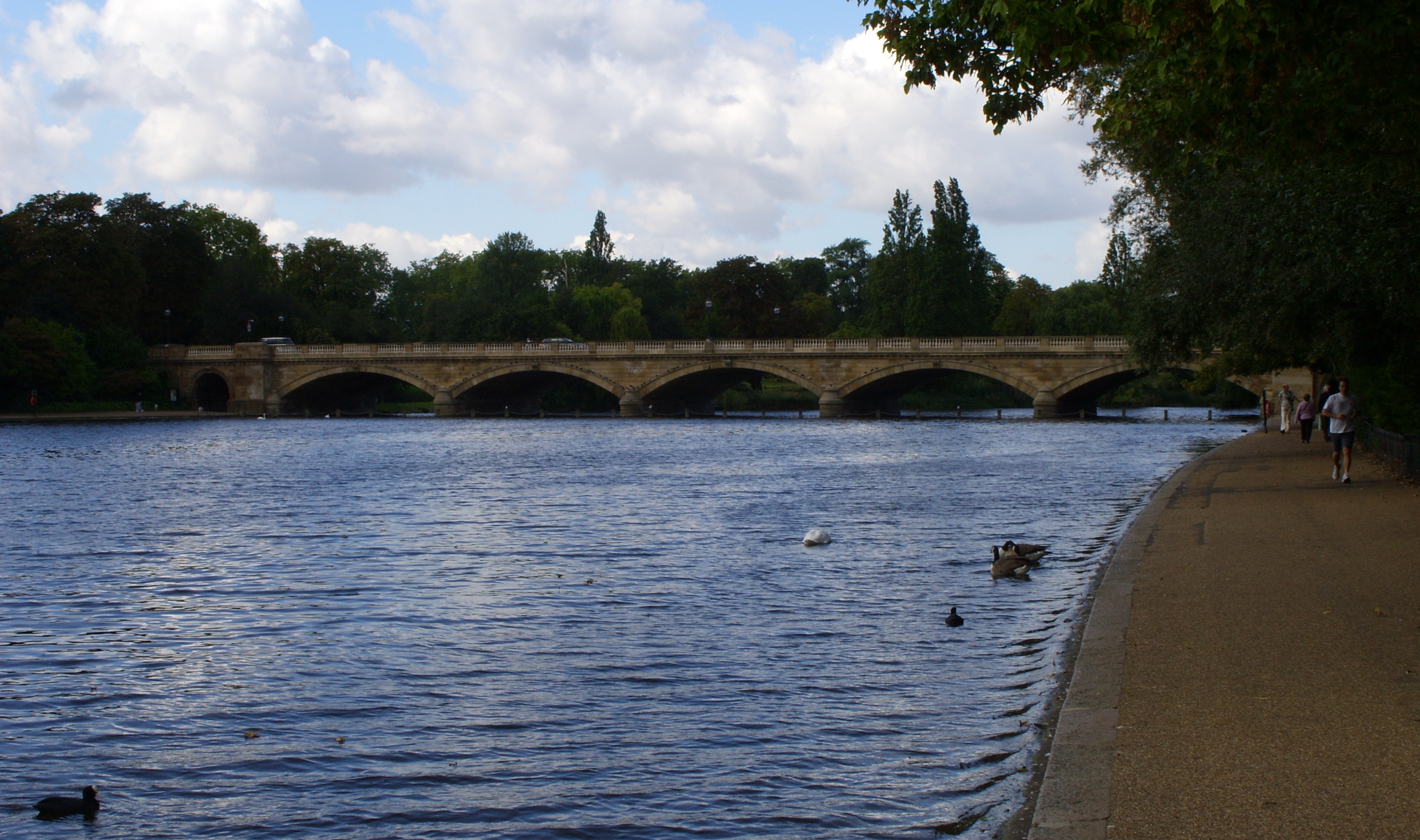
- The race was held in the Serpentine lake
- Venue: The Serpentine, Hyde Park
- Dates: August 9, 2012
- Competitors: 25 from 25 nations
- Winning time: 1:57:38.2

Medalists
1st place, gold medalist(s)		Éva Risztov	Hungary
2nd place, silver medalist(s)		Haley Anderson	United States
3rd place, bronze medalist(s)		Martina Grimaldi	Italy

The women's marathon swimming over a distance of 10 kilometres at the 2012 Olympic Games in London took place on 9 August in the Serpentine at Hyde Park in London, United Kingdom.

Hungary's Éva Risztov ended her eight-year absence from Olympic action to capture the women's 10 km marathon title in open water swimming. Leading most of the stretch in a grueling race, she held off a late resistant surge from American teen Haley Anderson on the last 50 metres to slam the timing touch pads and claim her first Olympic gold medal in 1:57:38.2. Swimming into the sixth and final lap, Anderson mounted a serious challenge against Italy's Martina Grimaldi for two more Olympic medals, but finished closely behind Risztov by 0.4 seconds with a silver-medal time in 1:57:38.6. Meanwhile, Grimaldi stunned the entire home crowd that lined the lake in one of London's iconic parks, as she picked off Great Britain's overwhelming favorite Keri-anne Payne (1:57:42.2) by a small fraction of a second for the bronze in 1:57:41.8.

Germany's Angela Maurer dropped off from the leading pack before the final stretch to fifth in 1:57:52.8, while Australia's Melissa Gorman, who opened the race with an early lead, faded further from the field to eleventh in 1:58:53.1.

Among the twenty-five swimmers registered in the field, two of them were unable to finish the race, while the other one did not officially compete. South Africa's Jessica Roux was pulled from the water halfway through the race to seek medical attention, while Brazil's Poliana Okimoto, who started the race in fourteenth but steadily fell back to twentieth with only two laps left, fainted from dehydration after she was hauled into one of the safety boats.

== Qualification ==
The women's 10 km open water marathon at the 2012 Olympics featured a field of 25 swimmers:

- 10: the top-10 finishers in the 10 km race at the 2011 FINA World Championships.
- 9: the top-9 finishers at the 2012 Olympic Marathon Swim Qualifier (8–9 June 2012 in Setúbal, Portugal).
- 5: one representative from each FINA continent (Africa, Americas, Asia, Europe and Oceania). (These were selected based on the finishes at the qualifying race in Setúbal.)
- 1: from the host nation (Great Britain) if not qualified by other means. If Great Britain already had a qualifier in the race, this spot was allocated back into the general pool from the 2012 qualifying race.

== Results ==
Rank	Athlete	Nation	Time	Time behind	Notes
1st place, gold medalist(s)	Éva Risztov	Hungary	1:57:38.2		
2nd place, silver medalist(s)	Haley Anderson	United States	1:57:38.6	+0.4	Warning
3rd place, bronze medalist(s)	Martina Grimaldi	Italy	1:57:41.8	+3.6	
4	Keri-anne Payne	Great Britain	1:57:42.2	+4.0	
5	Angela Maurer	Germany	1:57:52.8	+14.6	Warning
6	Ophélie Aspord	France	1:58:43.1	+1:04.9	
DSQ	Olga Beresnyeva	Ukraine	1:58:44.4	+1:06.2	DSQ
7	Erika Villaécija	Spain	1:58:49.5	+1:11.3	
8	Jana Pechanová	Czech Republic	1:58:52.8	+1:14.6	
9	Anna Guseva	Russia	1:58:53.0	+1:14.8	
10	Melissa Gorman	Australia	1:58:53.1	+1:14.9	Warning
11	Karla Šitić	Croatia	1:58:54.7	+1:16.5	
12	Yumi Kida	Japan	1:58:59.1	+1:20.9	Warning
13	Yanel Pinto	Venezuela	1:59:05.8	+1:27.6	
14	Natalia Charlos	Poland	1:59:58.7	+2:20.5	Warning
15	Heidi Gan	Malaysia	2:00:45.0	+3:06.8	
16	Cecilia Biagioli	Argentina	2:01:02.2	+3:24.0	
17	Zsofia Balazs	Canada	2:01:17.8	+3:39.6	
18	Swann Oberson	Switzerland	2:01:38.0	+3:59.8	
19	Natasha Tang	Hong Kong	2:02:33.4	+4:55.2	
20	Lizeth Rueda	Mexico	2:02:46.1	+5:07.9	
21	Marianna Lymperta	Greece	2:04:26.5	+6:48.3	
	Poliana Okimoto	Brazil	DNF		
	Jessica Roux	South Africa	DNF		
	Fang Yanqiao	China	DNS		
