= Swimming at the 2008 Summer Olympics – Event Order =

The schedule of swimming events at the 2008 Summer Olympics occurred in two segments:

- pools events: evening of August 9 through the morning of August 17, at the "Water Cube"
- open water events: August 20 and 21 at Shunyi Olympic Rowing-Canoeing Park (held between rowing events on the Olympic Rowing course).

For the pool events, prelims were held in the evening, with semifinals/final in the following morning session, with a day between semifinals and finals in those events with semifinals. The shift of the normal morning preliminary heats and evening finals (to evening prelims and morning finals) occurred for the 2008 Olympics due to a request made by USA's broadcaster NBC, so that the finals from the event could be shown "live" in the USA. (Live ended up being 11:00 p.m.-midnight on the East Coast; with a tape delay to the same time for the West Coast.)

== Pool schedule ==
date	Morning session Semifinals & Finals (10:00 a.m. local time)	Evening session Preliminary heats (6:30 p.m. local time)
Saturday; August 9	no session	men's 400 I.M. (prelims) women's 100 butterfly (prelims) men's 400 freestyle (prelims) women's 400 I.M. (prelims) men's 100 breaststroke (prelims) women's 4x100 Free Relay (prelims)
Sunday; August 10	men's 400 I.M. (final) women's 100 butterfly (semifinals) men's 400 freestyle (final) women's 400 I.M. (final) men's 100 breaststroke (semifinals) women's 4x100 Free Relay (final)	women's 100 backstroke (prelims) men's 200 freestyle (prelims) women's 100 breaststroke (prelims) men's 100 backstroke (prelims) women's 400 freestyle (prelims) men's 4x100 Free Relay (prelims)
Monday; August 11	women's 100 backstroke (semifinals) men's 200 freestyle (semifinals) women's 100 butterfly (final) men's 100 breaststroke (final) women's 100 breaststroke (semifinals) men's 100 backstroke (semifinals) women's 400 freestyle (final) men's 4x100 Free Relay (final)	women's 200 freestyle (prelims) men's 200 butterfly (prelims) women's 200 I.M.(prelims)
Tuesday; August 12	women's 200 freestyle (semifinals) men's 200 freestyle (final) women's 100 backstroke (final) men's 100 backstroke (final) women's 100 breaststroke (final) men's 200 butterfly (semifinals) women's 200 I.M.(semifinals & swim-off)	men's 100 freestyle (prelims) women's 200 butterfly (prelims) men's 200 breaststroke (prelims) men's 4x200 Free Relay (prelims)
Wednesday; August 13	men's 100 freestyle (semifinals) women's 200 freestyle (final) men's 200 butterfly (final) women's 200 butterfly (semifinals) men's 200 breaststroke (semifinals) women's 200 I.M. (final) men's 4x200 Free Relay (final)	women's 100 freestyle (prelims) men's 200 backstroke (prelims) women's 200 breaststroke (prelims) men's 200 I.M. (prelims) women's 4x200 Free Relay (prelims)
Thursday; August 14	men's 200 breaststroke (final) women's 100 freestyle (semifinals) men's 200 backstroke (semifinals) women's 200 butterfly (final) men's 100 freestyle (final) women's 200 breaststroke (semifinals) men's 200 I.M. (semifinals) women's 4x200 Free Relay (final)	men's 50 freestyle (prelims) women's 800 freestyle (prelims) men's 100 butterfly (prelims) women's 200 backstroke (prelims)
Friday; August 15	men's 50 freestyle (semifinals) women's 200 breaststroke (final) men's 200 backstroke (final) women's 200 backstroke (semifinals) men's 200 I.M. (final) women's 100 freestyle (final) men's 100 butterfly (semifinals)	women's 50 freestyle (prelims) men's 1500 freestyle (prelims) women's 4×100 medley relay (prelims) men's 4×100 medley relay (prelims)
Saturday; August 16	women's 200 backstroke (final) men's 100 butterfly (final) women's 800 freestyle (final) men's 50 freestyle (final) women's 50 freestyle (semifinals)	no session (all preliminary heats completed)
Sunday; August 17	women's 50 free (final) men's 1500 freestyle (final) women's 4×100 medley relay (final) men's 4×100 medley relay (final)	no session (all events concluded)

== Open Water schedule ==
date	Event (9:00 a.m. local time)
Wednesday; August 20	Women's Marathon 10K
Thursday; August 21	Men's Marathon 10K
