= Swimming at the 2011 Pan American Games – Women's marathon 10 kilometres =

Women's marathon 10 kilometres at the 2011 Pan American Games
- Venue: API Maritime Terminal
- Dates: October 22
- Competitors: 16 from 10 nations

Medalists
Gold medal	Cecilia Biagioli	Argentina
Silver medal	Poliana Okimoto	Brazil
Bronze medal	Christine Jennings	United States

The women's marathon 10 kilometres competition of the swimming events at the 2011 Pan American Games took place on the 22 of October at the API Maritime Terminal in Puerto Vallarta, Mexico. The defending Pan American Games champion was Chloe Sutton of the United States.

== Schedule ==
All times are Central Standard Time (UTC-6).

Date	Time	Round
October 22, 2011	9:00	Final

== Results ==
16 competitors from 10 countries are scheduled to compete.

Rank	Swimmer	Time
1st place, gold medalist(s)	Cecilia Biagioli (ARG)	2:04:11.5
2nd place, silver medalist(s)	Poliana Okimoto (BRA)	2:05:51.3
3rd place, bronze medalist(s)	Christine Jennings (USA)	2:05:52.2
4	Eva Fabian (USA)	2:05:54.8
5	Ana Marcela Cunha (BRA)	2:05:55.2
5	Nataly Caldas (ECU)	2:05:57.0
7	Zsofia Balazs (CAN)	2:06:22.2
8	Lizeth Rueda (MEX)	2:06:26.8
9	Yanel Pinto (VEN)	2:06:57.2
10	Pilar Geijo (ARG)	2:07:00.2
11	Alejandra Gonzalez (MEX)	2:11:38.0
12	Cindy Toscano (GUA)	2:21:20.8
13	Zuleimarie Hornedo (PUR)	2:22:27.2
14	Maria Muñoz (GUA)	2:27:31.4
–	Yadira Guerra (ESA)	DNF
–	Betsmara Cruz (PUR)	DNF
