= List of Summer Olympics venues: S =

Schwimmhalle in Munich. For the 1972 Summer Olympics, the venue hosted the diving, swimming part of the modern pentathlon, swimming, and water polo finals.

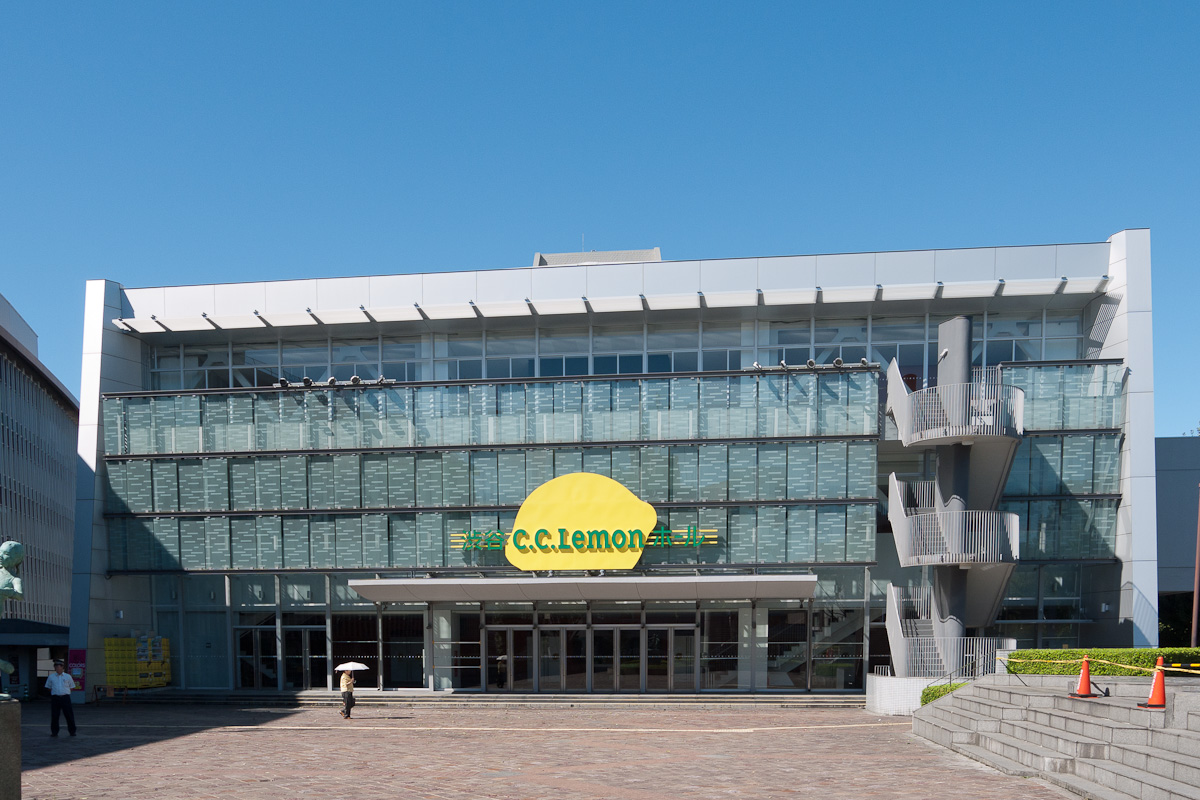
Shibuya Public Hall at Tokyo in 2011. The venue hosted weightlifting competitions for the 1964 Summer Olympics.

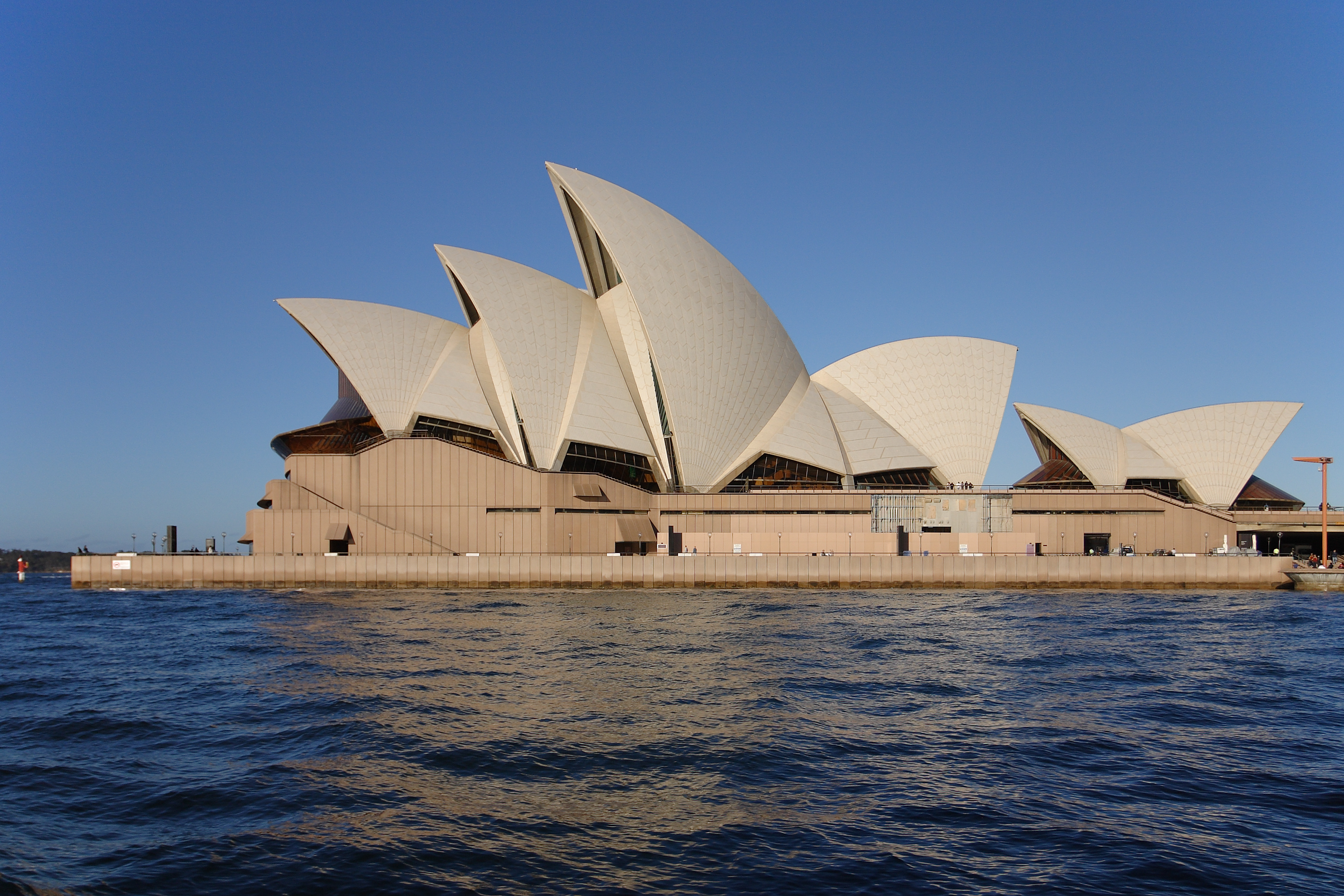
The Sydney Opera House hosted the triathlon events for the 2000 Summer Olympics.

For the Summer Olympics, there are 79 venues starting with the letter 'S'. This is the most among all venues alphabetically.

Venue	Games	Sports	Capacity	Ref.
Saint-Cloud	1924 Paris	Polo	7,836	
St James' Park	2012 London	Football	52,000	
St Kilda Town Hall	1956 Melbourne	Fencing	Not listed.	
St. Michel Arena	1976 Montreal	Weightlifting	2,000	
Saemaul Sports Hall	1988 Seoul	Volleyball	4,500	
Sambódromo	2016 Rio de Janeiro	Archery, Athletics (marathon)	36,000	
Sanford Stadium	1996 Atlanta	Football (final)	86,100	
Sangmu Gymnasium	1988 Seoul	Wrestling	5,000	
Sant Sadurní Cycling Circuit	1992 Barcelona	Cycling (individual road race)	45,000	
Santa Anita Park	1984 Los Angeles	Equestrian (all but eventing endurance)	33,500	
Santa Monica College	1984 Los Angeles	Athletics (marathon start)	Not listed.	
São Januário Stadium	2016 Rio de Janeiro	Rugby Sevens	40,000	
Sasazuka-machi	1964 Tokyo	Athletics (marathon, 50 km walk)	Not listed.	
Satellite Circuit	1968 Mexico City	Cycling (road)	Not listed	
Satory	1900 Paris	Shooting	Not listed.	
Schermzaal	1928 Amsterdam	Fencing, Modern pentathlon (fencing)	559	
Schießanlage	1972 Munich	Modern pentathlon (shooting), Shooting	4,500	
Schinias Olympic Rowing and Canoeing Centre	2004 Athens	Canoeing (sprint), Rowing	14,000	
Schwimmhalle	1972 Munich	Diving, Modern pentathlon (swimming), Swimming, Water polo (final)	9,182	
Selhurst Park	1948 London	Football	26,309	
Seine	1900 Paris	Rowing, Swimming, and Water polo	Not listed.	
Seongnam Stadium	1988 Seoul	Field hockey	23,262	
Seoul Equestrian Park	1988 Seoul	Equestrian (all but jumping individual final), Modern pentathlon (riding)	30,000	
Seoul National University Gymnasium	1988 Seoul	Badminton (demonstration), table tennis	5,000	
Shanghai Stadium	2008 Beijing	Football	80,000	
Shenyang Olympic Sports Center Stadium	2008 Beijing	Football	60,000	
Sherbrooke Sports Palace	1976 Montreal	Handball	4,400	
Sherbrooke Stadium	1976 Montreal	Football	10,000	
Shibuya Public Hall	1964 Tokyo	Weightlifting	2,200	
Shinjuku	1964 Tokyo	Athletics (marathon, 50 km walk)	Not listed	
Shunyi Olympic Rowing-Canoeing Park	2008 Beijing	Canoeing, Marathon swimming and Rowing	37,000	
Sloten	1928 Amsterdam	Rowing	2,230	
Sokolniki Sports Palace	1980 Moscow	Handball (final)	6,800	
Solent	1908 London	Sailing	Not listed.	
Southampton Water	1908 London	Sailing, Water motorsports	Not listed.	
Sparta Stadion Het Kasteel	1928 Amsterdam	Football	11,026	
Sporthalle Augsburg	1972 Munich	Handball	3,093	
Sports Palace	1980 Moscow	Gymnastics, Judo	11,500	
Stade Bergeyre	1924 Paris	Football	10,455	
Stade Joseph Marien	1920 Antwerp	Football	Not listed.	
Stade Nautique d'Antwerp	1920 Antwerp	Diving, Swimming, Water polo	Not listed.	
Stade de Colombes	1924 Paris	Athletics, Cycling (road), Equestrian, Fencing, Football (final), Gymnastics, Modern pentathlon (fencing, running), Rugby union, Tennis	22,737	
Stade de France	2024 Paris	Ceremonies (opening/closing), Athletics	78,338	
Stade de Paris	1924 Paris	Football	5,145	
Stade Pershing	1924 Paris	Football	8,110	
Stade Yves-du-Manoir	2024 Paris	Field hockey (preliminaries, 5-12 place classifications)	5,000	
Stade Yves-du-Manoir	2024 Paris	Field hockey (preliminaries, final four)	10,000	
Stadio dei Marmi	1960 Rome	Field hockey	15,000	
Stadio Flaminio	1960 Rome	Football (final)	32,000	
Stadio Olimpico	1960 Rome	Athletics	72,698	
Stadio Olimpico del Nuoto	1960 Rome	Diving, Modern pentathlon (swimming), Swimming, Water polo (final)	20,000	
Stadion Broodstraat	1920 Antwerp	Football	Not listed.	
Stadium at Olympia	2004 Athens	Athletics (shot put)	Not listed.	
Stanford Stadium	1984 Los Angeles	Football	85,500	
State Hockey Centre	2000 Sydney	Field hockey	15,000	
State Sports Centre	2000 Sydney	Table tennis, Taekwondo	5,006	
Stockholm Olympic Stadium	1912 Stockholm	Athletics, Equestrian, Football (final), Gymnastics, Modern pentathlon (running), Tug of war, Wrestling	33,000.	
Stone Mountain Park Archery Center and Velodrome	1996 Atlanta	Archery, Cycling (track)	5,200 (archery); 6,000 (cycling track)	
Stone Mountain Tennis Center	1996 Atlanta	Tennis	27,500	
Streets of Los Angeles	1984 Los Angeles	Athletics (20 km/ 50 km walk, marathon)	Not listed.	
Streets of Mission Viejo	1984 Los Angeles	Cycling (individual road race)	Not listed.	
Streets of Montreal	1976 Montreal	Athletics (marathon)	Not listed.	
Streets of Moscow	1980 Moscow	Athletics (20 km/ 50 km walk, marathon)	Not listed.	
Streets of Santa Monica	1984 Los Angeles	Athletics (marathon)	Not listed.	
Streets of Seoul	1988 Seoul	Athletics (20 km/ 50 km walk, marathon)	Not listed.	
Sunset Fields Golf Club	1932 Los Angeles	Modern pentathlon (running)	Not listed.	
Suwon Gymnasium	1988 Seoul	Handball	6,000	
Swimming Pool - Indoor	1980 Moscow	Water polo	10,500	
Swimming Pool - Olympiysky	1980 Moscow	Diving, Modern pentathlon (swimming), Swimming, Water polo (final)	13,000	
Swimming Stadium	1932 Los Angeles	Diving, Modern pentathlon (swimming), Swimming, Water polo	10000	
Swimming Stadium	1952 Helsinki	Diving, Swimming, Water polo	12,500	
Swimming/Diving Stadium	1956 Melbourne	Diving, Modern pentathlon (swimming), Swimming, Water polo	6,000	
Sydney Baseball Stadium	2000 Sydney	Baseball (final), Modern pentathlon (riding, running)	21,000	
Sydney Convention and Exhibition Centre	2000 Sydney	Boxing, Fencing, Judo, Weightlifting, Wrestling	7,500 (weightlifting), 9,000 (judo & wrestling), 10,000 (boxing & fencing)	
Sydney Entertainment Centre	2000 Sydney	Volleyball (indoor final)	11,000	
Sydney Football Stadium	2000 Sydney	Football (women's final)	42,000	
Sydney Football Stadium	2032 Brisbane	Football	42,500	
Sydney International Archery Park	2000 Sydney	Archery	17,500	
Sydney International Aquatic Centre	2000 Sydney	Diving, Modern pentathlon (swimming), Swimming, Synchronized swimming, Water polo (men's final)	10,000	
Sydney International Equestrian Centre	2000 Sydney	Equestrian	50,000	
Sydney International Regatta Centre	2000 Sydney	Canoeing (sprint), Rowing	20,000	
Sydney International Shooting Centre	2000 Sydney	Shooting	7,000	
Sydney Opera House	2000 Sydney	Triathlon	Not listed.	
Sydney SuperDome	2000 Sydney	Basketball (final), Gymnastics (artistic/ trampoline)	21,000	
