= Swimming at the 2012 European Aquatics Championships – Women's 800 metre freestyle =

Women's 800 metre freestyle at the 2012 European Aquatics Championships
- Dates: May 23, 2012 (heats); May 24, 2012 (final)
- Competitors: 15 from 12 nations
- Winning time: 8:26.49

Medalists
gold medal	Boglárka Kapás	Hungary
silver medal	Coralie Balmy	France
bronze medal	Éva Risztov	Hungary

The women's 800 metre freestyle competition of the swimming events at the 2012 European Aquatics Championships took place May 23 and 24. The heats took place on May 23, the final on May 24.

== Records ==
Prior to the competition, the existing world, European and championship records were as follows.

	Name	Nation	Time	Location	Date
World record European record	Rebecca Adlington	Great Britain	8:14.10	Beijing	August 16, 2008
Championship record	Laure Manaudou	France	8:19.29	Budapest	August 2, 2006

== Results ==
=== Heats ===
16 swimmers participated in 2 heats.

Rank	Heat	Lane	Name	Nationality	Time	Notes
1	1	5	Coralie Balmy	France	8:32.45	Q
2	2	5	Éva Risztov	Hungary	8:33.44	Q
3	2	3	Melanie Costa Schmid	Spain	8:34.00	Q
4	1	4	Erika Villaécija García	Spain	8:36.07	Q
5	2	4	Boglárka Kapás	Hungary	8:36.18	Q
6	1	3	Camelia Potec	Romania	8:37.05	Q
7	1	7	Julia Hassler	Liechtenstein	8:40.38	Q, NR
8	2	2	Martina de Memme	Italy	8:41.46	Q
9	2	6	Alessia Filippi	Italy	8:41.51	
10	1	6	Isabelle Härle	Germany	8:43.00	
11	2	1	Spela Bohinc	Slovenia	8:52.22	
12	1	2	Nina Dittrich	Austria	8:55.23	
13	2	7	Donata Kilijanska	Poland	8:56.77	
14	2	8	Sigrún Brá Sverrisdóttir	Iceland	9:16.50	
15	1	8	Cecilia Eysturdal	Faroe Islands	9:40.31	
	1	1	Theodora Giareni	Greece	DNS	

=== Final ===
The final was held at 17:02.

Rank	Lane	Name	Nationality	Time	Notes
1st place, gold medalist(s)	2	Boglárka Kapás	Hungary	8:26.49	
2nd place, silver medalist(s)	4	Coralie Balmy	France	8:27.79	
3rd place, bronze medalist(s)	5	Éva Risztov	Hungary	8:27.87	
4	6	Erika Villaécija García	Spain	8:29.21	
5	3	Melanie Costa Schmid	Spain	8:29.71	
6	7	Camelia Potec	Romania	8:37.01	
7	1	Julia Hassler	Liechtenstein	8:38.18	NR
8	8	Martina de Memme	Italy	8:38.86	
