= Marathon swimming at the 2008 Summer Olympics – Women's 10 kilometre =

Women's 10 km open water marathon at the Games of the XXIX Olympiad
- Venue: Shunyi Olympic Rowing-Canoeing Park
- Date: August 20, 2008
- Competitors: 25 from 23 nations
- Winning time: 1:59:27.7

Medalists
1st place, gold medalist(s)		Larisa Ilchenko	Russia
2nd place, silver medalist(s)		Keri-Anne Payne	Great Britain
3rd place, bronze medalist(s)		Cassandra Patten	Great Britain

The women's marathon swimming 10 kilometre event at the 2008 Olympic Games took place on 20 August at the Shunyi Olympic Rowing-Canoeing Park in Beijing, China.

Russia's Larisa Ilchenko sprinted to a top finish in the final stages. With only 150 metres left, she put in a late charge to overhaul the British duo Keri-Anne Payne and Cassandra Patten on the right side of the pack, and slapped the yellow pads to capture the gold in a sterling time of 1:59:27.7. Payne trailed behind Ilchenko by exactly half a second (0.50), but powered home with a silver in 1:59:29.2, while Patten snatched the bronze in 1:59:31.0 to hold off a grueling battle from Germany's Angela Maurer (1:59:31.9) by almost a full second.

Netherlands' two-time world champion Edith van Dijk earned a fourteenth spot in 2:00:02.8, while South Africa's Natalie du Toit, the first ever amputee in history to compete at the Olympics, enjoyed the race of her life as she finished with a highly respectable, sixteenth-place effort in 2:00:49.9. A member of the nation's swim team, she lost her leg below the knee from a motor scooter accident in 2001.

== Qualification ==
The women's 10 km races at the 2008 Olympics featured a field of twenty-five swimmers:

- 10: the top-10 finishers in the 10 km races at the 2008 FINA World Championships in Seville, Spain.
- 9: the top-9 finishers at the Good Luck Beijing Olympic 10K Marathon Test Event (31 May–1 June 2008 in Beijing, China).
- 5: one representative from each FINA continent (Africa, Americas, Asia, Europe and Oceania). (These were selected based on the finishes at the World Championships.)
- 1: from the host nation (China) if not qualified by other means.

== Competition format ==
Unlike all of the swimming events in the pool, the men's and women's marathon 10 kilometre races were held in open water. No preliminary heats were held, with only the single mass-start race being contested. This race is held using freestyle swimming, with a lack of stroke regulations. For most of the event swimmers use the front crawl, but modifications are used situationally, especially when swimmers reach feeding stations.

Open water swimming events require different tactics and showcase several different racing strategies that are more common to competitive cycling, marathon running and water polo than traditional pool swimming. It is one of the few Olympic sports where the athlete's coaches play a critical role during the actual event. The coaches have four opportunities to provide drinks to their athletes as the athletes swim by floating pontoons in the course. If the coach falls in the water, his or her athlete is immediately disqualified.

== Results ==
Rank	Athlete	Nation	Time	Time behind	Notes
1st place, gold medalist(s)	Larisa Ilchenko	Russia	1:59:27.7		
2nd place, silver medalist(s)	Keri-Anne Payne	Great Britain	1:59:29.2	1.5	
3rd place, bronze medalist(s)	Cassandra Patten	Great Britain	1:59:31.0	3.3	
4	Angela Maurer	Germany	1:59:31.9	4.2	
5	Ana Marcela Cunha	Brazil	1:59:36.8	9.1	
6	Swann Oberson	Switzerland	1:59:36.9	9.2	
7	Poliana Okimoto	Brazil	1:59:37.4	9.7	
8	Jana Pechanová	Czech Republic	1:59:39.7	12.0	
9	Andreína Pinto	Venezuela	1:59:40.0	12.3	
10	Martina Grimaldi	Italy	1:59:40.7	13.0	
11	Marianna Lymperta	Greece	1:59:42.3	14.6	
12	Teja Zupan	Slovenia	1:59:43.7	16.0	
13	Yurema Requena	Spain	1:59:46.9	19.2	
14	Edith van Dijk	Netherlands	2:00:02.8	35.1	
15	Melissa Gorman	Australia	2:00:33.6	1:05.9	
16	Natalie du Toit	South Africa	2:00:49.9	1:22.2	
17	Daniela Inácio	Portugal	2:00:59.0	1:31.3	
18	Eva Berglund	Sweden	2:01:05.0	1:37.3	
19	Fang Yanqiao	China	2:01:07.9	1:40.2	
20	Imelda Martínez	Mexico	2:01:07.9	1:40.2	
21	Aurelie Muller	France	2:02:04.1	2:36.4	
22	Chloe Sutton	United States	2:02:13.6	2:45.9	
23	Nataliya Samorodina	Ukraine	2:10:41.6	11:13.9	
24	Antonella Bogarin	Argentina	2:11:35.9	12:08.2	
	Kristel Köbrich	Chile	DNF		
