= Swimming at the 2010 South American Games – Women's 10 km open water =

The women's 10 km open water event at the 2010 South American Games was held on March 25 at 9:10.

== Medalists ==
Gold	Silver	Bronze
Andreina Pinto; Venezuela	Ana Marcela Cunha; Brazil	Antonella Bogarin; Argentina

== Results ==
Rank	Athlete	Result
1st place, gold medalist(s)	Andreina Pinto (VEN)	1:58:10.1
2nd place, silver medalist(s)	Ana Marcela Cunha (BRA)	1:58:10.3
3rd place, bronze medalist(s)	Antonella Bogarin (ARG)	1:58:15.5
4	Nataly Rosalta Calle (ECU)	1:58:18.8
5	Katia Paola Esquivel (ECU)	1:58:21.8
6	Patricia Maldonado (VEN)	1:59:51.1
7	Marianela Mendoza (ARG)	2:05:50.7
8	María Muñoz (COL)	2:06:59.5
9	Diana Franco (COL)	2:13:40.4
10	Tania Tamara Sanchez (PAR)	2:16:47.6
	Patricia Mariana San Martin (PER)	DNS
	Alexandra Rosel Blanco (BOL)	DNS
	Isabelle Longo (BRA)	DNS
	Carolina Pfeifer (CHI)	DNS
