= Nataliya Samorodina =

Ukrainian swimmer (born 1983)

Personal information
- Full name: Nataliya Anatoliïvna Samorodina
- National team: Ukraine
- Born: 17 March 1983 (age 43) Zaporizhia, Ukrainian SSR, Soviet Union
- Height: 1.70 m (5 ft 7 in)
- Weight: 58 kg (128 lb)

Sport
- Sport: Swimming
- Strokes: Butterfly, open water
- Club: Ukraïna Zaporizhzhia

Nataliya Anatoliïvna Samorodina (Ukrainian: Наталія Анатоліївна Самородіна; born March 17, 1983) is a Ukrainian former swimmer, who specialized in butterfly events and open water marathon. She represented Ukraine in two editions of the Olympic Games (2004 and 2008) and also swam for Ukraïna Zaporizhzhia.

Samorodina made her first Ukrainian team at the 2004 Summer Olympics in Athens, where she competed in the women's 200 m butterfly. Swimming in heat one, she put up a sprint race with neighboring Russia's Maria Bulakhova and Chinese Taipei's Cheng Wan-jung on the final lap, but could not catch them by almost a full-body length to finish third and twenty-seventh overall in 2:17.15.

At the 2008 Summer Olympics in Beijing, Samorodina shifted her focus from the pool to the open water surface, competing in the inaugural women's 10 km marathon. Leading up to the Games, she placed fourth in the 10 km Marathon Swimming Olympic test event at Shunyi Olympic Rowing-Canoeing Park. Swimming against a field of twenty-four, including South African amputee Natalie du Toit, British duo Keri-Anne Payne and Cassandra Patten, and sixteen-year-old American Chloe Sutton, Samorodina finished the grueling race in twenty-third position with a total time of 2:10:41.6, eleven minutes and thirteen seconds (11:13) behind winner Larisa Ilchenko of Russia.
