= Swimming at the 2012 European Aquatics Championships – Women's 1500 metre freestyle =

Women's 1500 metre freestyle at the 2012 European Aquatics Championships
- Dates: May 25, 2012 (heats); May 26, 2012 (final)
- Competitors: 10 from 8 nations
- Winning time: 16:05.34

Medalists
gold medal	Mireia Belmonte García	Spain
silver medal	Éva Risztov	Hungary
bronze medal	Erika Villaécija García	Spain

The women's 1500 metre freestyle competition of the swimming events at the 2012 European Aquatics Championships took place May 25 and 26. The heats took place on May 25, the final on May 26.

== Records ==
Prior to the competition, the existing world, European and championship records were as follows.

	Name	Nation	Time	Location	Date
World record	Kate Ziegler	United States	15:42.54	Mission Viejo	June 17, 2007
European record	Alessia Filippi	Italy	15:44.93	Rome	July 28, 2009
Championship record	Flavia Rigamonti	Switzerland	15:58.54	Eindhoven	March 23, 2008

== Results ==
=== Heats ===
12 swimmers participated in 2 heats.

Rank	Heat	Lane	Name	Nationality	Time	Notes
1	2	7	Mireia Belmonte García	Spain	16:21.60	Q
2	2	4	Erika Villaécija García	Spain	16:32.69	Q
3	1	4	Éva Risztov	Hungary	16:33.56	Q
4	2	5	Camelia Potec	Romania	16:35.46	Q
5	1	3	Julia Hassler	Liechtenstein	16:37.75	Q
6	1	5	Marianna Lymperta	Greece	16:47.02	Q
7	1	6	Donata Kilijanska	Poland	16:55.08	Q
8	2	2	Theodora Giareni	Greece	17:06.85	Q
9	2	6	Nina Dittrich	Austria	17:08.49	
10	1	7	Iryna Glavnyk	Ukraine	17:16.21	
	1	2	Nuala Murphy	Ireland	DNS	
	2	3	Martina Grimaldi	Italy	DNS	

=== Final ===
The final was held at 17:02.

Rank	Lane	Name	Nationality	Time	Notes
1st place, gold medalist(s)	4	Mireia Belmonte García	Spain	16:05.34	
2nd place, silver medalist(s)	3	Éva Risztov	Hungary	16:10.04	NR
3rd place, bronze medalist(s)	5	Erika Villaécija García	Spain	16:15.85	
4	6	Camelia Potec	Romania	16:17.88	
5	2	Julia Hassler	Liechtenstein	16:31.66	NR
6	7	Marianna Lymperta	Greece	16:36.97	
7	8	Theodora Giareni	Greece	17:01.57	
8	1	Donata Kilijanska	Poland	17:08.61	
