= St. Mary of the Angels Church, Hollywood =

- St. Mary of the Angels Anglo-Catholic Church, Hollywood, California
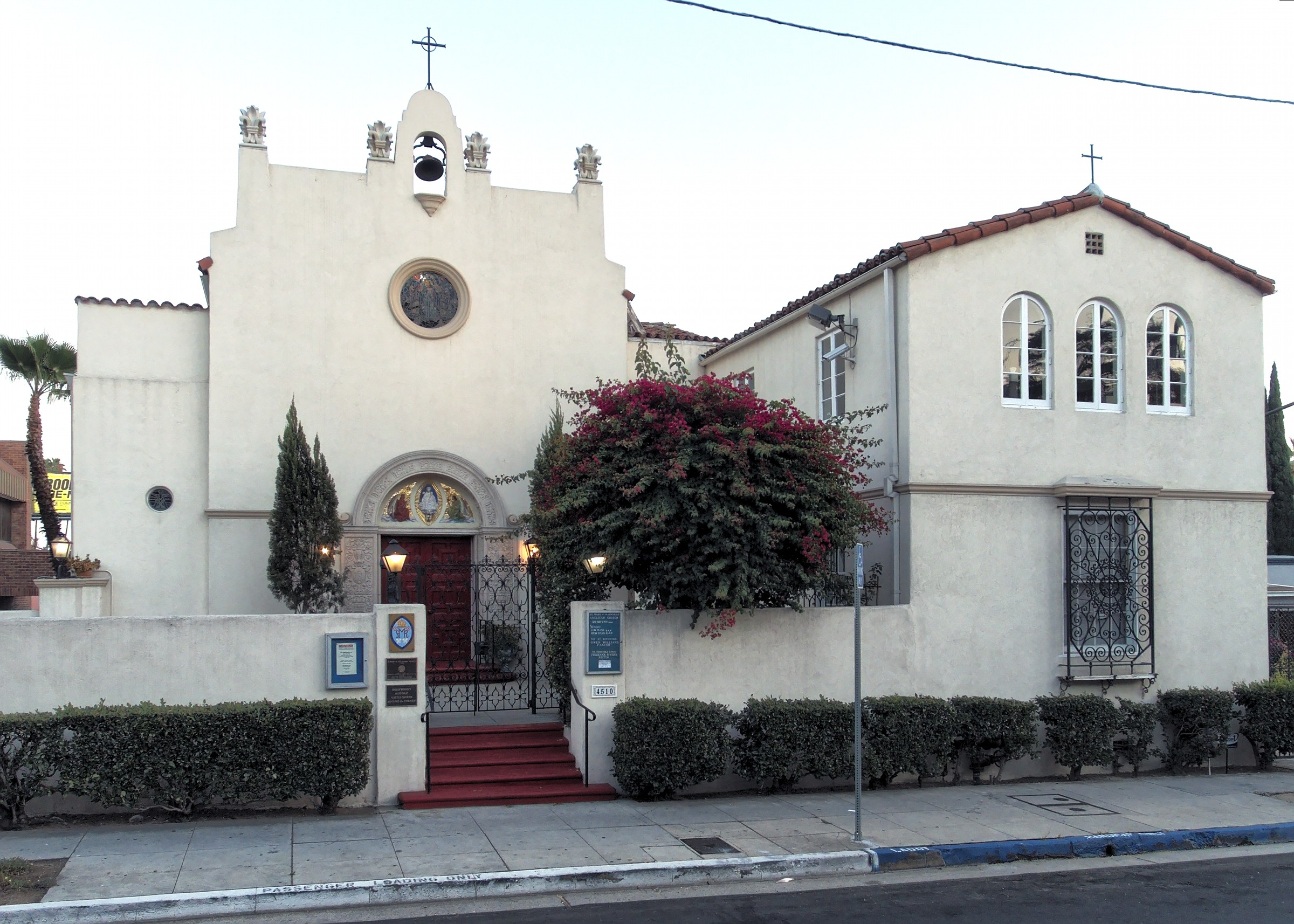
- St. Mary of the Angels Church in 2015

- Shown within Hollywood, CA
- 34.107420°N 118.287903°W
- Location: Hollywood, California
- Country: United States of America
- Denomination: Anglo-Catholic
- Website: stmaryshollywood.org

History
- Former name(s): St. Mary of the Angels Anglican Church; St. Mary of the Angels Episcopal Church
- Founded: February 3, 1918
- Consecrated: February 3, 1918

Architecture
- Heritage designation: Hollywood Cultural Historical Landmark No. 136
- Designated: 1974
- Architect: Carleton Winslow
- Architectural type: Spanish Mission-style
- Years built: 1929-1930
- Groundbreaking: 1929
- Completed: 1930

Administration
- Province: Anglican Catholic Church
- Diocese: Diocese of the West

Clergy
- Archbishop: The Most Reverend Mark Haverland
- Bishop: The Rt Rev'd Robert M. Hammond
- Rector: The Rev'd Michael Erickson, JD

St. Mary of the Angels Church, Hollywood, formally the St. Mary of the Angels Anglo-Catholic Church, Hollywood, California, and referred to locally as "St. Mary's", is an Anglo-Catholic church in the Los Feliz neighborhood of Hollywood, California.

== History ==
St. Mary's was founded by the Rev. Neal Dodd, an Iowan native who moved to Hollywood, California and became a technical advisor and eventual actor in the early years of Hollywood's film industry development. His involvement in the early days of Hollywood as priest on and off screen earned him many nicknames, like "The Padre of Hollywood", "Hollywood’s Padre", and "One Take Dodd".

Originally, St. Mary's and her congregation gathered in a small storefront on N. Vermont Avenue in Hollywood, before moving to a space on New Hampshire Avenue where a Lutheran church now stands. The old church building on New Hampshire was razed in preparations for the Lutheran church's construction.

== Architecture ==
The first church building for St. Mary's was a rented storefront on N Vermont Avenue that still stands. However, St. Mary's moved not too long after. After having raised US$1100 (February 4, 2018 equivalent: $17,832.09), a small church building was built in a week on New Hampshire Avenue.

The present building was designed in the Spanish Mission-style by noted architect Carleton Winslow. Much of the planning occurred in 1929. Church records of tentative specifications for St. Mary's include specific details for a great deal of wood carpentry, including oak and birch wood with oil staining, varnish, and Lammens "Permo" waterproof brush coats, as well as hand made mission tiles for the roofing. Galvanized iron, steel, copper, concrete, and other materials help complete St. Mary's.

Finials, decorative additions at the top of the building's façade, were included as well, made of cast stone. At some point, they were no longer a part of the building but were replaced in 2011. A stained-glass window depicting St. Genesius was dedicated in 1988.

A part of its architecture also includes an addition made in the mid-1900s wherein the altar space was changed slightly to accommodate a 16th-century della Robbia faience from Florence.

=== The della Robbia faience ===
The faience is a terra cotta and porcelain altarpiece of the Annunciation, along with two side statues of St. John and St. Francis as well as two smaller side statues of floral arrangements in large vases. It was donated to St. Mary's according to church history in the 1920s by the founder of The Broadway and Bullocks department stores and was a fixture in the church when it was on New Hampshire Avenue.

When the current church building for St. Mary's was built, it was installed outside as a permanent fixture in one of the walls of the small church courtyard garden before being moved inside during the mid-1900s.

According to church records, the remodel of the sanctuary to accommodate the della Robbia required extensive flexibility. The pews inside the church were removed in order to make room for a track to be temporarily installed from the front doors of the church to the altar. A crane was required to carry each piece of the faience to and down the track, sideways. The entirety of the faience weighs over 15 tons.

Furthermore, the church building's floor was reinforced, especially under the altar sanctuary before any of the installation could occur. The area where the faience currently resides was originally a squared-off ending to the building but was replaced with a curved, steel shell was installed behind the altar at the time of installation. Wrought iron work was installed where the della Robbia had been in the garden.

== Music and choirs ==
=== Organ ===
- Details of the organ from the OHS Pipe Organ Database.

The organ at St Mary's was originally built in 1906 for the S.A. Sanderson residence in Long Beach, California. It was sold in 1912 to E.F. Robbins for his home in Pasadena, California. In 1927, William Ripley Dorr purchased the organ for his studio in Los Angeles, California. Some time after, it was sold to St. Mary's and dedicated. Also according to church history, W.C. Fields underwrote part of the organ.

The organ has tubular pneumatic key action and pneumatic stop action. It also has two (2) manuals, 10 stops, and 10 ranks. Its manual compass is 61 notes and its pedal compass is 30. It also has an attached keydesk.

=== Organists and Choirmasters ===
The Organist and Choirmaster has the responsibility of directing the St Mary of the Angels Schola Cantorum.

Since 1820 the posts of Organist and Choirmaster have been held by a number of musicians, often being combined.

=== Choirs ===
The choir at St. Mary's is known as the St. Mary of the Angels Schola Cantorum. They sing at each Sunday Solemn High Mass as well as specific High Holy Days throughout the year, including Christmas, Holy Week, and Easter Masses.

Much of their repertoire comes from the hymnals found in the pews. They also practice anthems or special Mass Parts responses for the weekly services.

Prior selections include: •"I Was Glad" by C. Hubert H. Parry •"Laud We The Name Of God Most Holy" by J.S. Bach •"Magnificat and Nunc Dimittis" by Orlando Gibbons •"How Lovely is Thy Dwelling Place" by Johannes Brahms •"Kyrie" and "Agnus Dei I" from Palestrina's "Missa Brevis"

== Church service schedule ==
=== High or Low Masses ===
St. Mary's has a rich tradition with regards to their celebration of the Mass. However, this tradition is shared in different ways. A "High Mass" has more music and song in the form of Gregorian Chant or other kinds of chant throughout the Mass. There are also more people involved with the ceremonial aspect of the Mass helping the priest, usually including a deacon and a subdeacon. Incense is also used during the service. A sermon is almost always shared after the Gospel readings at a High Mass. Usually, the High Mass at St. Mary's is a Solemn High Mass; however, Festal High Masses are celebrated on major feast days, with principal service on Sundays and major holy days.

By contrast, a Low Mass is celebrated by one priest, usually assisted by an acolyte. The words of the liturgy are spoken, not sung, incense is not used, and sermons are rarely included.

The Solemn High Mass for the church is celebrated every Sunday at 10:00 AM PST. Low Masses include the Sunday Low Mass at 8:00 AM.

== See also ==
- List of oldest church buildings
- Carleton Winslow
- Church architecture
- Church (building)
- List of the oldest churches in the United States
- List of Anglo-Catholic churches

== Video clips ==
Walkthroughs, and interviews

- St. Mary of the Angels Hollywood, California QUICK LOOK (2016) on YouTube
