= Lammens =

Lammens is a surname. Notable people with the surname include:

- Albert Lammens (1890–1933), Belgian tennis player
- Hank Lammens (born 1966), Canadian ice hockey player
- Henri Lammens (1862–1937), Belgian Orientalist historian and Jesuit
- Manon Lammens (born 1991), Belgian swimmer
- Matías Lammens (born 1980), Argentine politician
- Senne Lammens (born 2002), Belgian footballer
