= Swimming at the 2007 Pan American Games – Women's marathon 10 kilometres =

The Women's 10K Marathon swim at the 2007 Pan American Games took place in the waters of Copacabana Beach in Rio de Janeiro, Brazil on 14 July 2007.

== Medalists ==
Gold	Chloe Sutton; United States
Silver	Poliana Okimoto; Brazil
Bronze	Tanya Hunks; Canada

== Results ==
Rank	Swimmer	Time	Time Behind
1	Chloe Sutton (USA)	2:13:47.6	0.0
2	Poliana Okimoto (BRA)	2:13:48.4	0.8
3	Tanya Hunks (CAN)	2:13:50.5	2.9
4	Kalyn Keller (USA)	2:14:20.9	33.3
5	Andreina Pinto (VEN)	2:14:24.4	36.8
6	Karley Stutzel (CAN)	2:14:37.3	49.7
7	Ana Marcela Cunha (BRA)	2:17:12.2	3:24.6
8	Alejandra Galan Lopez (MEX)	2:18:26.0	4:38.4
9	Mitchell Santiago (VEN)	2:21:17.1	7:29.5
10	Imelda Martinez (MEX)	2:23:52.3	10:04.7
11	Nataly Caldas Calle (ECU)	2:29:24.2	15:36.6
12	Marianela Mendoza (ARG)	2:35:29.8	21:42.2
13	Michel Tixe Cobos (ECU)	2:47:34.2	33:46.6
14	Maria Jose Mailliard (CHI)	2:47:34.6	33:47.0
15	Mariam Marcucci (PAN)	2:59:54.9	46:07.3
16	Cindy Toscano (GUA)	3:00:17.2	46:29.6
—	Pilar Geijo (ARG)	DNF	
