= Genesius of Rome =

3rd-century Roman comedian, actor and Christian martyr

Saint Genesius of Rome
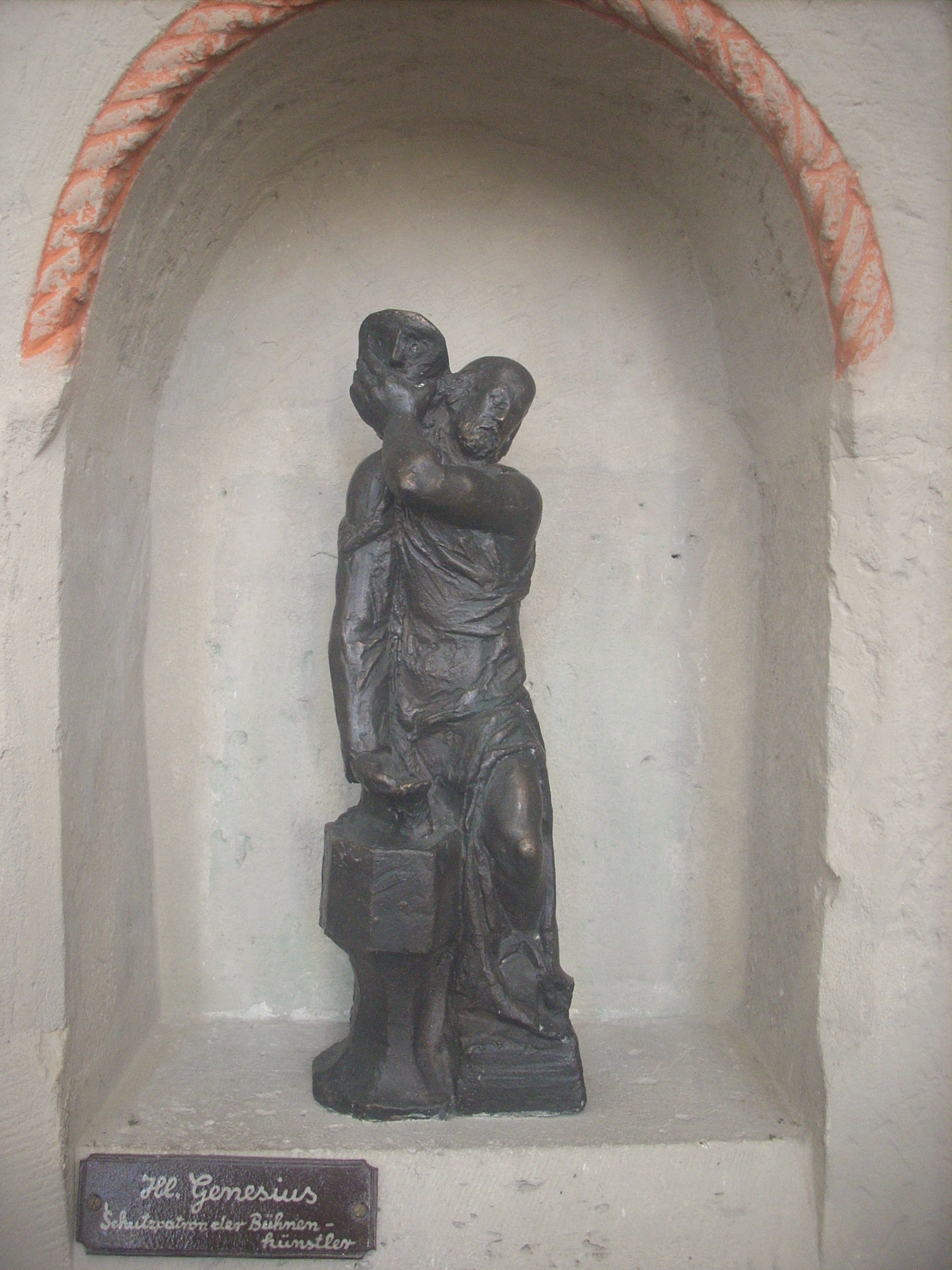
- Statue of St. Genesius with drama mask and baptismal font in St. Giles Church in Braunschweig, Lower Saxony, Germany

Actor & martyr
- Born: 3rd century
- Died: 303
- Venerated in: Roman Catholic Church and Eastern Orthodox Church
- Major shrine: Church of Santa Susanna, Rome, Italy
- Feast: August 25
- Patronage: Actors, playwrights, clowns, comedians, comics, converts, dancers, musicians, stenographers, printers, lawyers, epileptics, thieves, torture victims

Genesius of Rome is a legendary Christian saint, once a comedian and actor who had performed in plays that mocked Christianity. According to legend, while performing in a play that made fun of baptism, he had an experience on stage that converted him. He proclaimed his new belief, and he steadfastly refused to renounce it, even when the emperor Diocletian ordered him to do so.

Genesius is considered the patron saint of actors, lawyers, barristers, clowns, comedians, converts, dancers, people with epilepsy, musicians, printers, stenographers, and victims of torture. His feast day is August 25.

== Hagiography ==
One day Genesius, leader of a theatrical troupe in Rome, was performing before the Roman Emperor Diocletian. Intending to expose Christian religious rites to ridicule by his audience, he pretended to receive the Sacrament of Baptism.

As the play continued, however, Genesius suddenly while performing had a conversion experience on stage. He announced his new faith, and refused to renounce it, even when ordered to do so by emperor Diocletian. Genesius persisted in his faith, and he was finally ordered to be beheaded.

== Veneration ==
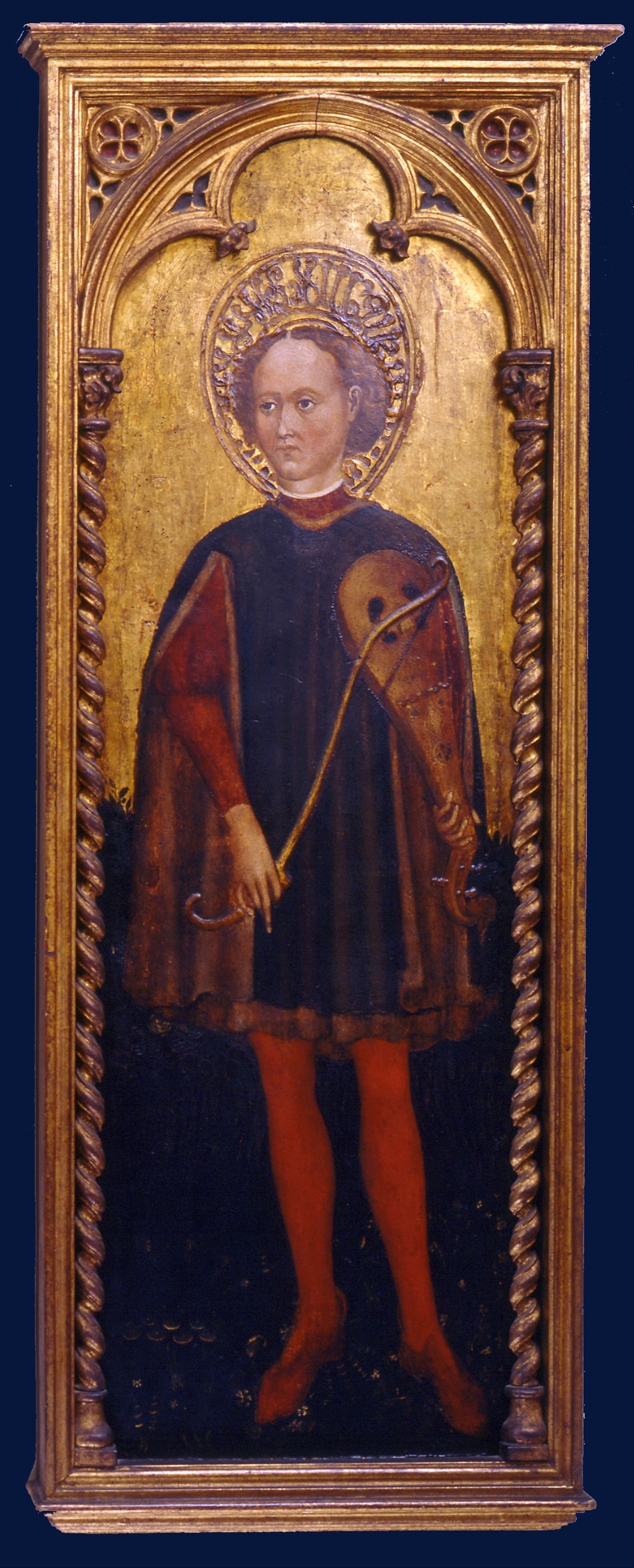
Saint Genesius by Cristoforo Moretti

Genesius of Rome is said to have been buried in the Cemetery of St. Hippolytus on the Via Tiburtina. His relics are claimed to be kept in San Giovanni della Pigna, Santa Susanna di Termini, and the chapel of St. Lawrence. His legend was dramatized in the 15th century. It was embodied later in the oratorio "Polus Atella" by Löwe, and more recently in a play by Weingartner. The accuracy of the Acts, dating from the 7th century, is very questionable, though it was defended by Tillemont (Mémoires, IV s. v. Genesius). Nevertheless, a Saint Genesius was venerated at Rome as early as 4th Century. A church was built in his honor, and it was repaired and beautified by Pope Gregory III in 741. A gold glass portrait of him dating to the 4th Century also exists.

== Contemporary relevance ==
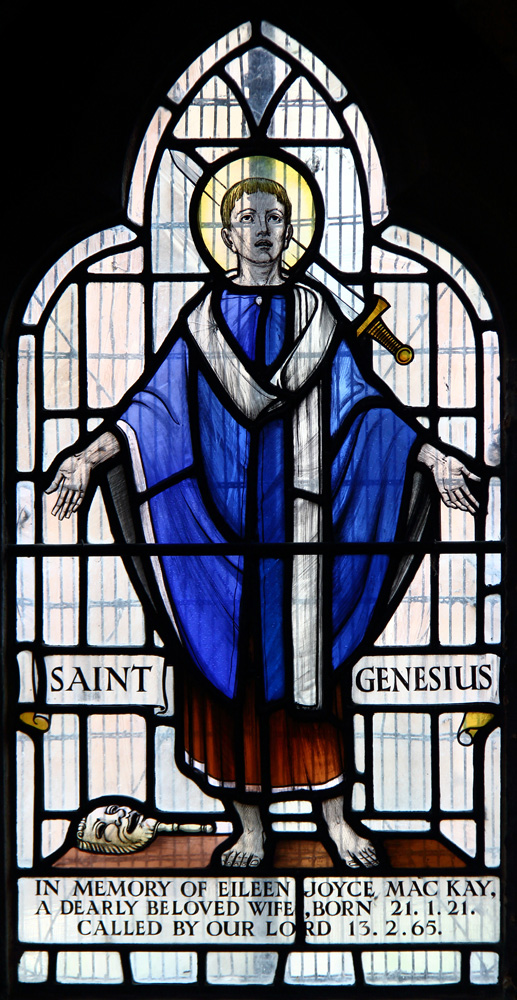
Stained glass window of St Genesius at St Chad, Chadwell Heath

The veneration of St Genesius continues today, and the actor-martyr is considered the patron of actors and acting societies, including those that assist actors. The British Catholic Stage Guild regards him as their patron saint, and the Shrine of St. Genesius in Saint Malachy's Roman Catholic Church in the New York City Borough of Manhattan, serves as a spiritual landmark for the city's acting community. As the patron saint of epilepsy, many thus afflicted turn to him for his help. Because he is associated with stagecraft, Genesius is also venerated by stage magicians and illusionists. He is one of the patrons of the Catholic Magicians' Guild. A stained-glass window depicting St. Genesius was dedicated at St. Mary of the Angels Church in Hollywood, California, in 1988.

A Genesian Theatre in Sydney, Australia hosts six seasons each year and is the centre of an amateur acting community. Other amateur companies around the world also use his name, including the Genesius Guild of Hammond, Indiana, which hosts an average of four productions each year and an annual children's theater camp, the Genesius Theater of Reading, Pennsylvania, basis for the Lincoln Center production of Douglas Carter Beane's "Shows for Days" starring Patti LuPone, Saint Genesius Productions of Villa Park, Illinois, a youth theatre group that aims to build leadership and community through the theatre arts, and the Genesius Guild and Foundation in the Quad Cities in the United States, which focuses on classical Greek Drama.

A new association in the Roman Catholic Church, The Fraternity of St Genesius, has been founded under this Saint's patronage. It aims to support men and women who work in theatre and cinema.

== See also ==
- Saint Vitus
