= The Wave (game show) =

British game show television series

- Genre: Game show
- Presented by: Rylan Clark-Neal
- Starring: Keri-anne Payne
- Composer: Nick Foster
- Country of origin: United Kingdom
- Original language: English
- No. of seasons: 1
- No. of episodes: 10

Production
- Running time: 48 minutes
- Production company: Primal Media

Original release
- Network: W
- Release: 15 January – 19 March 2018

The Wave is a British game show which premiered on 15 January 2018 until 19 March 2018, as a ten-part series on W. It is hosted by Rylan Clark-Neal with Keri-anne Payne overseeing the contestants. The concept of the show is that teams consisting of two members would enter the show together. One of the team members would be in the sea whilst the other will stay on land. The teammate in the sea will swim to pontoons to answer questions to win a cash prize. If they got an answer wrong, they would get weighed down by rocks.

== Transmissions ==
Series	Start date	End date	Episodes
1	15 January 2018	19 March 2018	10
