= Daniela Inácio =

Portuguese swimmer

Personal information
- Full name: Daniela Guerra Inácio
- National team: Portugal
- Born: 24 May 1989 (age 37) Moscow, Russian SFSR, Soviet Union
- Height: 1.69 m (5 ft 7 in)
- Weight: 51 kg (112 lb)

Sport
- Sport: Swimming
- Strokes: Open water
- Club: Belenenses

Daniela Guerra Inácio (born May 24, 1989) is a Russian-born Portuguese swimmer, who specialized in open water marathon. She represented her nation Portugal at the 2008 Summer Olympics, finishing seventeenth in the inaugural 10 km race.

Inacio competed as a lone female open water swimmer for Portugal in the 10 km marathon at the 2008 Summer Olympics in Beijing. Leading up to the Games, she finished with a fourteenth-place time in 2:04:29.6 to take one of the eleven available Olympic spots at the 10 km Marathon Swimming Olympic test event in Shunyi Olympic Rowing-Canoeing Park. Farther from the leaders by about eight body lengths, Inacio could not release herself from the middle of the pack to claim the seventeenth spot in 2:00:59.0, one minute and thirty-one seconds (1:31) behind winner Larisa Ilchenko of Russia.
