= Imelda Martínez =

Mexican swimmer

Personal information
- Full name: Imelda Martínez Gómez
- Nationality: Mexico
- Born: 16 July 1982 (age 44) Monterrey, Nuevo León, Mexico
- Height: 1.63 m (5 ft 4 in)
- Weight: 60 kg (132 lb)

Sport
- Sport: Swimming
- Event: Open water marathon

Imelda Martínez Gómez (born July 16, 1982, in Monterrey, Nuevo León) is a Mexican swimmer, who specialized in open water marathon. Martinez qualified for the 2008 Summer Olympics in Beijing, after placing seventh in the 10 km Marathon Swimming Olympic test event at Shunyi Olympic Rowing-Canoeing Park. Martinez swam in the first-ever women's 10 km open water marathon, against a field of 24 other competitors, including South African amputee swimmer Natalie du Toit, British duo Keri-Anne Payne and Cassandra Patten, and sixteen-year-old American Chloe Sutton. Martinez finished the race in twentieth place, with a time of 2:01:07.9, one minute and forty seconds (1:40) behind winner Larisa Ilchenko of Russia.
