= Teja Zupan =

Slovenian swimmer (born 1990)

Personal information
- Nationality: Slovenia
- Born: 4 December 1990 (age 35) Radovljica, SR Slovenia, SFR Yugoslavia
- Height: 1.68 m (5 ft 6 in)
- Weight: 60 kg (132 lb)

Sport
- Sport: Swimming
- Strokes: Open water
- Club: PK Radovljica

Teja Zupan (born 4 December 1990, in Radovljica) is a Slovenian swimmer, who specialized in open water marathon. Zupan qualified for the 2008 Summer Olympics in Beijing, after placing tenth in the 10 km Marathon Swimming Olympic test event at Shunyi Olympic Rowing-Canoeing Park. Zupan swam in the first-ever women's 10 km open water marathon, against a field of 24 other competitors, including South African amputee swimmer Natalie du Toit, British duo Keri-Anne Payne and Cassandra Patten, and sixteen-year-old American Chloe Sutton. Zupan finished the race in twelfth place, with a total time of 1:59:43.7, sixteen seconds behind winner Larisa Ilchenko of Russia.
