= Éva Risztov =

Hungarian swimmer (born 1985)

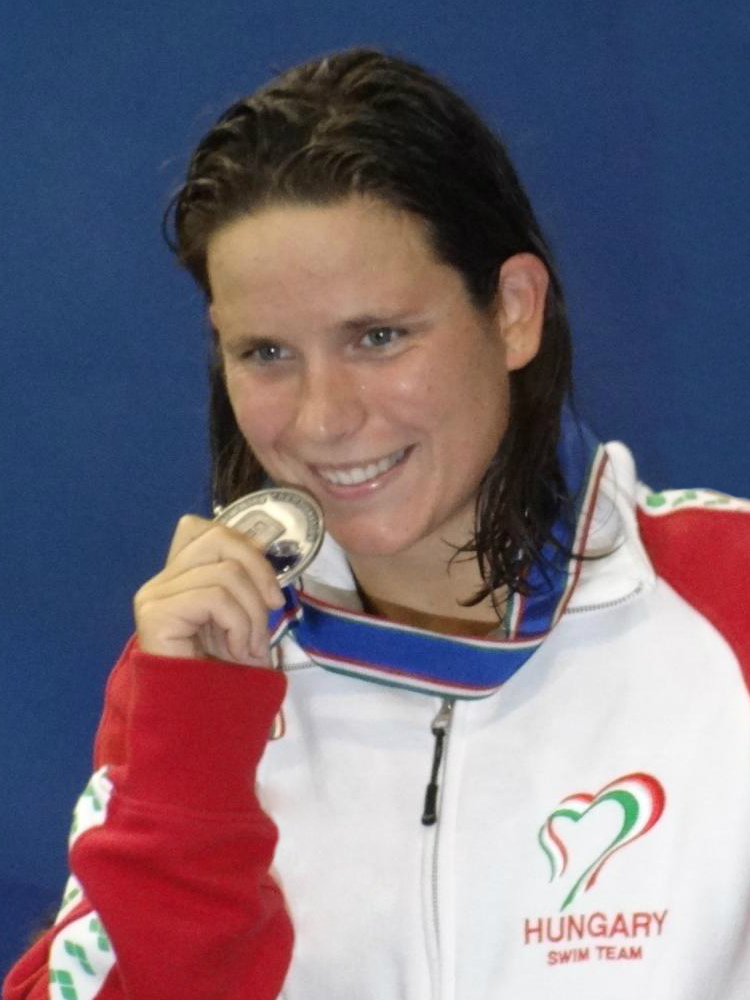

Personal information
- Full name: Risztov Éva
- Born: 30 August 1985 (age 41) Hódmezővásárhely, Csongrád, Hungary
- Height: 1.73 m (5 ft 8 in)
- Weight: 64 kg (141 lb)

Sport
- Sport: Swimming
- Strokes: Butterfly, medley
- Club: Hódúszó SE (-2000); Budapest Spartacus (2001–2004); Kőbánya SC Budapest (2005); Debreceni Sportcentrum-Sportiskola (2009-)
Medal record
Women's swimming
Representing Hungary
Event	1st	2nd	3rd
Olympic Games	1	0	0
World Championships (LC)	0	3	0
European Championships (LC)	0	7	1
European Championships (SC)	6	1	1
Total	7	11	2
Olympic Games
Gold medal – first place	2012 London	10 km marathon
World Championships (LC)
Silver medal – second place	2003 Barcelona	400 m freestyle
Silver medal – second place	2003 Barcelona	200 m butterfly
Silver medal – second place	2003 Barcelona	400 m medley
European Championships (LC)
Silver medal – second place	2002 Berlin	400 m freestyle
Silver medal – second place	2002 Berlin	800 m freestyle
Silver medal – second place	2002 Berlin	200 m butterfly
Silver medal – second place	2002 Berlin	400 m medley
Silver medal – second place	2004 Madrid	400 m medley
Silver medal – second place	2012 Debrecen	1500 m freestyle
Silver medal – second place	2014 Berlin	10 km
Bronze medal – third place	2012 Debrecen	800 m freestyle
European Championships (SC)
Gold medal – first place	2002 Riesa	400 m freestyle
Gold medal – first place	2002 Riesa	800 m freestyle
Gold medal – first place	2002 Riesa	200 m butterfly
Gold medal – first place	2003 Dublin	200 m butterfly
Gold medal – first place	2003 Dublin	400 m medley
Gold medal – first place	2004 Vienna	400 m medley
Silver medal – second place	2002 Riesa	400 m medley
Bronze medal – third place	2003 Dublin	800 m freestyle

Éva Risztov (pronounced [ˈeːvɒ ˈristov]; born 30 August 1985) is a Hungarian Olympic gold medalist female swimmer.

She won four silver medals at the 2002 European Aquatics Championships and three silver medals at the 2003 World Aquatics Championships. She won a further silver medal at the 2004 European Aquatics Championships and competed at the 2004 Summer Olympics where she came 4th in 400 m individual medley. At the European Short Course Swimming Championships she won six gold medals, one silver medal and one bronze medal between 2002 and 2004.

She retired in 2005, but announced her comeback in 2009 as an open water swimmer and she competed at the 2010 European Aquatics Championships in Women's 10 km where she came 7th.

At the 2012 Summer Olympics in London she competed in the 400 metre freestyle (16th), 800 metre freestyle (13th), 4 × 100 metre freestyle relay (15th) and the 10 kilometre marathon, in which she won the gold medal, having dominated the race from the outset.

== Achievements ==
- Olympic Games
  - Olympic Champion in 2012 (10 km marathon)
  - 4th place in 2004 (400 m individual medley)
- World Championships
  - 2003 3 Silver medals (in 400 m freestyle, 200 m butterfly, 400 m individual medley)
- European LC Championships
  - 2002 4 Silver medals (in 400 m freestyle, 200 m butterfly, 400 m individual medley, 800 m freestyle)
  - 2004 1 Silver medal (in 400 m individual medley)
  - 2012 1 Silver medal, 1 Bronze medal (in 1500 m medley and in 800 m individual medley)
  - 2014 1 Silver medal (10 km marathon)
- European SC Championships
  - 2002: 3 Gold medals (in 400 m freestyle, 800 m freestyle, 200 m butterfly); 1 Silver medal (in 400 m individual medley
  - 2003: 2 Gold medals (in 200 m butterfly, 400 m individual medley), 1 Bronze medal (in 800 m freestyle)
  - 2004: 1 Gold medal (in 400 m individual medley)
- 58 times Hungarian champion.

== Other interests ==
She is interested in different sports and physical activities. She tried motocross, skiing, yoga, jetski.

She is fond of abandoned dogs and supports them with collecting textiles and taking care of them regularly.

== Awards ==
- Hungarian swimmer of the Year (3): 2002, 2003, 2012
- Cross of Merit of the Republic of Hungary – Silver Cross (2004)
- Best Hungarian long-distance swimmer of the Year (1): 2010
- Order of Merit of Hungary – Officer's Cross (2012)
- Hajós Alfréd award (2012)
- Swimming World Magazine – Open Water Swimmer of the Year (1): 2012
- Hajdú-Bihar County Príma award (2012)
- Hungarian Sportswoman of the Year (1) – votes of sports journalists: 2012
- Open water swimmer of the year (FINA) (2012)
- Honorary Citizen of Debrecen (2013)

Awards
Preceded by Tamara Csipes	Hungarian Sportswoman of The Year; 2012	Succeeded by Katinka Hosszú
Preceded by (United Kingdom) Keri-Anne Payne	Open Water Swimmer of the Year; 2012	Succeeded by (Brazil) Poliana Okimoto
Preceded by (United Kingdom) Keri-Anne Payne	FINA Open Water Swimmer of the Year; 2012	Succeeded by (Brazil) Poliana Okimoto
