= Manon Lammens =

Belgian swimmer

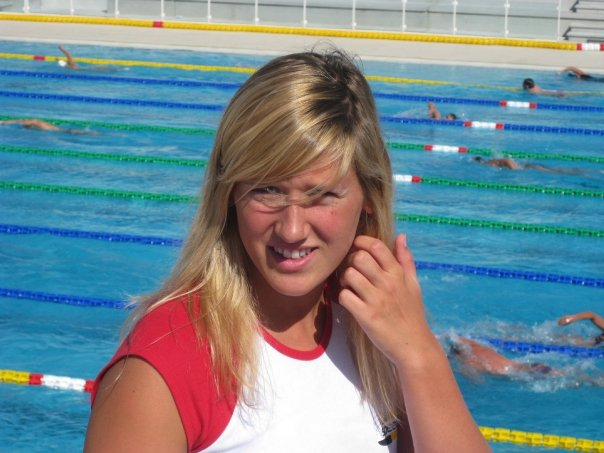

Personal information
- National team: Belgium
- Born: 19 February 1991 (age 34)

Sport
- Sport: Swimming
- Strokes: Open water swimming

Manon Lammens (born 19 February 1991) is a Belgian female swimmer who competes in the Open water swimming category.

== Career ==
She has competed for Belgium in few international competitions including the 2009 World Aquatics Championships where she took part in the women's 10km open water event finishing 12th out of 45 competitors in the relevant competition.

She also competed at the 2010 FINA World Open Water Swimming Championships and finished on 8th position in the women's 10K category.
