= Karla Šitić =

Croatian swimmer

Medal record

Women's swimming

Representing Croatia

Universiade
Bronze medal – third place	2013 Kazan	10 km marathon

Karla Šitić (born 6 May 1992 in Split, Croatia) is a Croatian distance swimmer. At the 2012 Summer Olympics, she competed in the women's 10 km marathon. She eventually finished 12th, with a time of 1:58:54.7, 1 minute 16.5 seconds behind winner Éva Risztov.
