= Antonella Bogarín =

Argentine swimmer (born 1991)

Personal information
- Full name: Antonella Bogarín
- National team: Argentina
- Born: 11 November 1991 (age 34) Santa Fe, Argentina
- Height: 1.70 m (5 ft 7 in)
- Weight: 66 kg (146 lb)

Sport
- Sport: Swimming
- Strokes: Open water

Antonella Bogarín (born November 11, 1991) is an Argentine swimmer, who specialized in open water marathon events. She represented her nation Argentina at the 2008 Summer Olympics, finishing twenty-fourth in the inaugural open water marathon.

Bogarin competed as a lone female open water swimmer for Argentina in the 10 km marathon at the 2008 Summer Olympics in Beijing. Leading up to the Games, she placed twelfth in the 10 km Marathon Swimming Olympic test event at Shunyi Olympic Rowing-Canoeing Park. Bogarin finished the grueling race in twenty-fourth place with a total time of 2:11:35.9, approximately twelve minutes behind winner Larisa Ilchenko of Russia.
