= Theodora Giareni =

Greek swimmer (born 1990)

Personal information
- Born: 3 March 1990 (age 36) Marousi, Athens, Greece
Medal record
Women's swimming
Representing Greece
Mediterranean Games
Silver medal – second place	2013 Mersin	4x100 m freestyle

Theodora Giareni (born 3 March 1990 in Marousi, Athens, Greece) is a Greek swimmer. At the 2012 Summer Olympics, she competed for the national team in the Women's 4 x 100 metre freestyle relay. The team finished in 16th (last) place in the heats, failing to reach the final.

== 2016 Olympics ==
She failed a doping control test was sent home from the 2016 Rio Olympic Games. In 2017 she received a 4-year ban from swimming competition.
