= Zsofia Balazs =

Hungarian-born Canadian distance swimmer

Personal information
- Full name: Zsofia Balazs
- National team: Canada
- Born: July 4, 1990 (age 36) Budapest, Hungary
- Height: 1.68 m (5 ft 6 in)
- Weight: 58 kg (128 lb)

Sport
- Sport: Swimming
- Strokes: Freestyle
- Club: Toronto Swim Club
Medal record
Women's swimming
Representing Canada
Pan American Games
Silver medal – second place	2007 Rio	4x200 m freestyle

Zsofia Balazs (born July 4, 1990) is a Canadian distance swimmer. At the 2012 Summer Olympics, she competed in the women's marathon 10 kilometre, finishing in 18th place.

She participated in the 2011 FINA World Championships in the 10K Olympic qualifier in Shanghai, China and the 2012 FINA 10 km Marathon Swimming World Cup circuit. She finished sixth in the final FINA Olympic marathon swim qualifier with the fastest closing sprint where she qualified for the Olympic 10 km marathon swim in London.

At the 2007 Pan American Games in Rio de Janeiro, Brazil, she claimed a silver medal in the 4x200-metre freestyle relay by participating in heats.

Balazs immigrated to Canada with her family in 2004 from Hungary, made the 2005 Canada Games team and won silver in the 200 butterfly. She won the Canadian National Open Water 10 km title in 2006, 2008, 2009 and 2010 and the 1500 m freestyle in 2010.

She swims for the Toronto Swim Club and her idol is Hungarian swimming great Ágnes Kovács.

Balazs now currently works for the Toronto Police Service as a police officer.
