= Fang Yanqiao =

Chinese swimmer

Personal information
- Born: January 18, 1989 (age 37) Beijing, China

Sport
- Sport: Swimming
Medal record
Representing China
World Open Water Championships
Bronze medal – third place	2010 Roberval	10km open water

Fang Yanqiao (born 18 January 1989) is a Chinese swimmer who competed for Team China at the 2008 Summer Olympics.

== Major achievements ==
- 2008 World Open Water Championships – 12th 10 km
- 2010 World Open Water Championships – 3rd 10 km

== See also ==
- China at the 2012 Summer Olympics – Swimming
