= Poliana Okimoto =

Brazilian swimmer (born 1983)

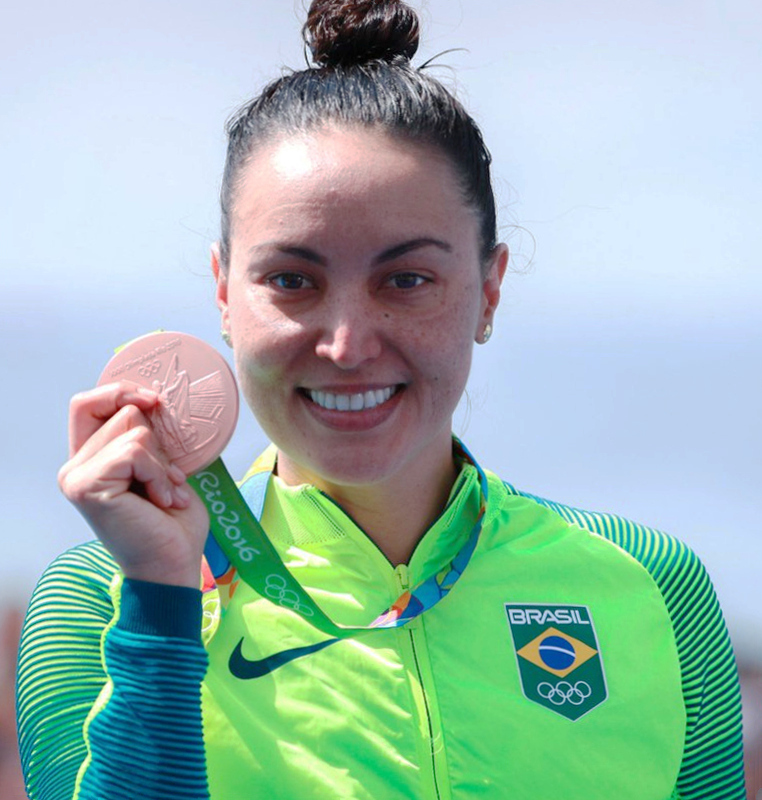
- Okimoto at the 2016 Olympics

Personal information
- Full name: Poliana Okimoto Cintra
- Nationality: Brazil
- Born: 8 March 1983 (age 43) São Paulo, Brazil
- Height: 1.65 m (5 ft 5 in)
- Weight: 52 kg (115 lb)

Sport
- Sport: Swimming
- Strokes: Freestyle
- Club: Unisanta
- Coach: Ricardo Cintra
Medal record
Women's swimming
Representing Brazil
Olympic Games
Bronze medal – third place	2016 Rio de Janeiro	10 km open water
World Championships
Gold medal – first place	2013 Barcelona	10 km open water
Silver medal – second place	2013 Barcelona	5 km open water
Bronze medal – third place	2009 Rome	5 km open water
Bronze medal – third place	2013 Barcelona	Team open water
World Open Water Championships
Silver medal – second place	2006 Naples	5 km open water
Silver medal – second place	2006 Naples	10 km open water
Pan American Games
Silver medal – second place	2007 Rio de Janeiro	10 km open water
Silver medal – second place	2011 Guadalajara	10 km open water

Poliana Okimoto Cintra (born 8 March 1983) is a Brazilian long-distance swimmer.

== Career ==
She was at the 2002 FINA World Swimming Championships (25 m) in Moscow, where she finished 18th in the 800-metre freestyle.

She won the Travessia dos Fortes in 2005.

Okimoto competed in the 2007 Pan American Games in Rio de Janeiro, in the first appearance of the marathon swimming, where she received the silver medal in the Women's 10K, the first Brazilian medal at this edition.

Okimoto finished 7th in the inaugural aquatic marathon (10 km race) at the 2008 Olympics.

She also swam at the 2008 Open Water World Championships in Seville, Spain.

In 2009, Okimoto won the marathon swimming World Cup, winning 9 of 11 stages held, becoming the first Brazilian champion of the sport.

At the 2009 World Aquatics Championships in Rome, obtained the bronze medal. With that, she broke a 15 years-fast for Brazil in the World Championships, and became the first Brazilian woman to win a medal in the competition's history. She was considered by Época magazine one of the 100 most influential Brazilians in 2009.

She was at the 2010 Pan Pacific Swimming Championships in Irvine, where she finished 20th in the 400-metre freestyle.

In 2010, she broke the short-course Brazilian records of the 800-metre freestyle (8:27.77) and 1500-metre freestyle (16:09.04).

At the 2011 Pan American Games in Guadalajara, Okimoto repeated the 2007 result, and again won the silver.

In the 2012 Olympics in London Okimoto was unable to complete the race due to the water temperature, being disqualified. The frustration that followed led Okimoto to clinical depression and thoughts of abandoning the sport, before being convinced otherwise by among others her husband-coach Ricardo Cintra.

At the 2013 World Aquatics Championships, in Barcelona, Poliana had a historical participation. She won the silver medal in the Women's 5K race, and, some days later, became the World Champion in the 10K race. Finishing, in the team event, she won the bronze medal with the Brazilian team, along with Samuel de Bona and Allan do Carmo.

On 12 August 2013, Okimoto broke the Brazilian record in the 1500-metre freestyle, with a time of 16:26.90.

At the 2015 FINA World Championships in Kazan, Okimoto finished 6th in the 10 km marathon.

Okimoto initially finished fourth at the 10 km race at the 2016 Olympics hosted by Brazil. A disqualification of second placed Aurélie Muller upgraded her to the bronze, making Okimoto the first Brazilian woman to win a swimming Olympic medal.

The following year, Okimoto wound up absent of the 2017 World Championships, finishing third in the national 10 km qualifiers and skipping the 5 km ones.

== See also ==
- List of Brazilian records in swimming

Awards
Preceded by Sheilla Castro	Brazilian Sportswomen of the Year; 2013	Succeeded by Martine Grael and Kahena Kunze
Preceded by (Hungary) Éva Risztov	FINA Open Water Swimmer of the Year; 2013	Succeeded by (Brazil) Ana Marcela Cunha
