= Cassie Patten =

British swimmer

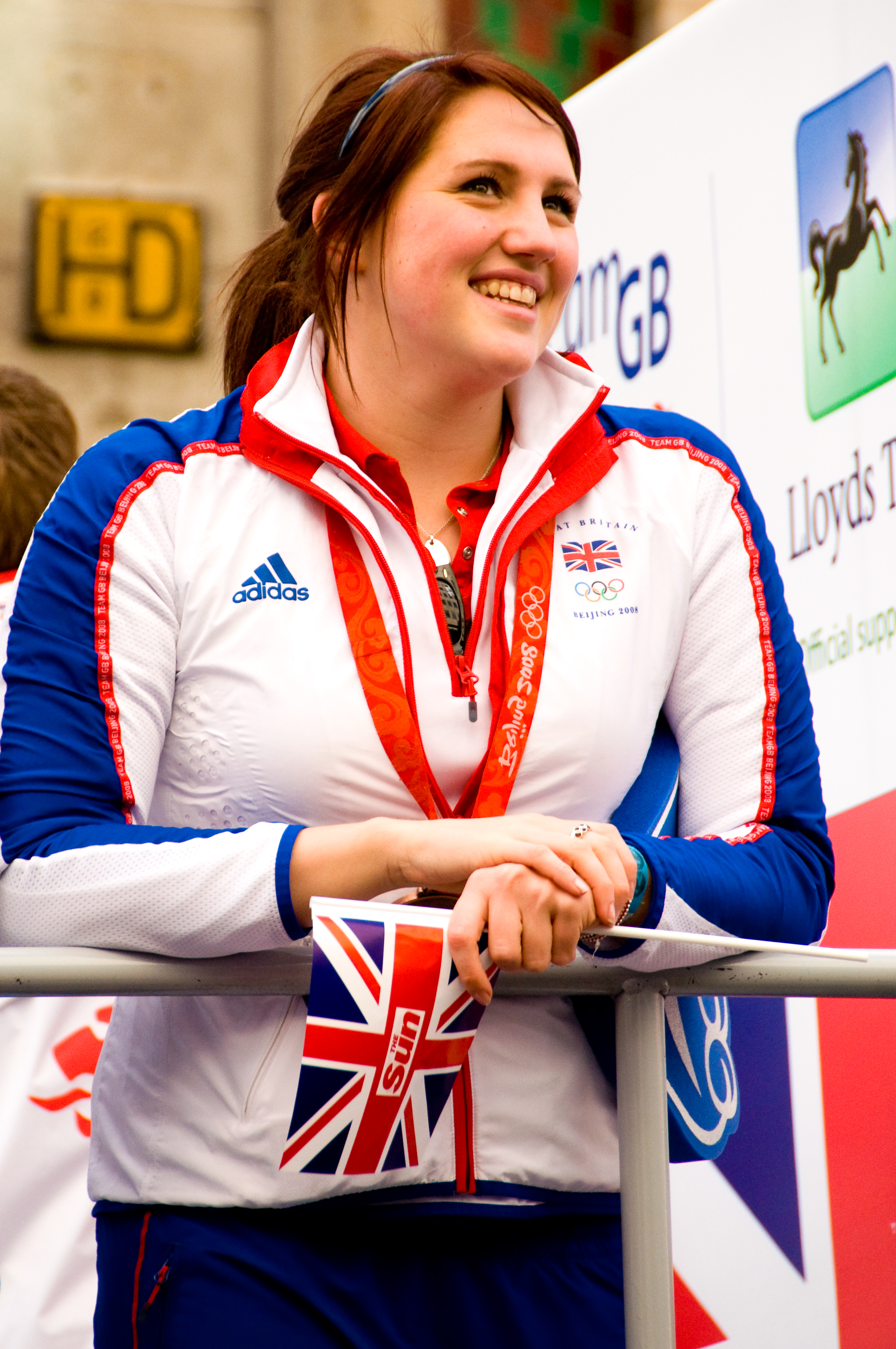
- Patten in 2008

Personal information
- Full name: Cassandra Lily Patten
- Nationality: British
- Born: 1 January 1987 (age 39) Cardinham, England
- Height: 179 cm (5 ft 10 in)
- Weight: 84 kg (185 lb)

Sport
- Sport: Swimming
- Strokes: Freestyle
- Club: Stockport Metro
Medal record
Women's swimming
Representing Great Britain
Olympic Games
Bronze medal – third place	2008 Beijing	Marathon 10 km
World Championships (LC)
Silver medal – second place	2007 Melbourne	10 km open water

Cassandra ("Cassie") Lily Patten (born 1 January 1987) is a British freestyle swimmer and coach who won the bronze in the 10 km open-water event at the 2008 Beijing Olympics.

== Early life ==
Her first swimming lesson took place with Dave Darborne in Bodmin when she was five years old. She joined Bodmin Swimming Club. She stayed there for the next eight years where, aged 13, she went to her first national age group championships where she came 5th in the 200m butterfly.

Aged 14, she attended Plymouth College as a swimming scholar. She enjoyed her time at the school and she was made senior prefect and the house captain of Chaytor's House. Patten was coached by Jon Rudd, Amanda Booth and Jo Johns in the highly successful Plymouth Leander Swimming programme at this time.

Aged 19, she moved to Stockport Metro Swimming club outside Manchester, to be coached by Sean Kelly. He moved her away from the 200m butterfly and trained her to become a distance freestyle swimmer. Shee would often swim 80–100 km per week at the Grand Central Pools in Stockport. Kelly was her coach at the Beijing Olympics.

== Swimming career ==
Patten was a late developer in swimming. She won her first national medal, a bronze, in 2003 aged 16, in the 200m butterfly. Also in 2003, she first represented Great Britain at the European Championships in Dublin.

The next year was her most successful in her youth career. At the 2004 Youth National championships, she won four golds (100m and 200m butterfly, 400m and 800m freestyle) as well as two silver (200 freestyle and 400 individual medley). She also qualified for the World short course Championships in Indianapolis, where she came 4th in the 800m freestyle.

At the British Championships in 2006, she won a bronze in the 400m and a silver in the 800m. At the British Championships in 200, she won a bronze in the 400m freestyle and a silver in the 200m butterfly. In her third year at the championships, which doubled as the 2008 Olympic trials, she won silver in the 800m freestyle and qualified to represent Team GB in this event.

Her open water career started in 2006 when she competed in several world and European Cup events. In her first year open water swimming, she was the overall best female in Europe and took home the LEN cup.

She won a silver medal in the 10 km freestyle at the 2007 World championship, only three seconds behind Larisa Ilchenko, the gold medallist. Patten represented Great Britain at the 2008 Summer Olympics in the 800m freestyle and also in the 10 km open water swimming event, where she won a bronze medal. Her international swimming career lasted eight years and she competed in one Olympics, eight World championship events and ten European Championship events.

== Post swimming career ==
Since retiring from swimming, Patten has taken up coaching which has seen her travel all over Europe delivering coaching sessions, with various companies including SwimQuest, Speedo, Zoggs, Swim Smooth and British swimming. Alongside her coaching career, she has a growing career as a sports commentator. Patten was the lead swimming pundit at the London Olympic Games for Sky Sports News in 2012 and commentated on the 10 km open water marathons in Hyde Park. Patten has a swim coaching column in Outdoor Swimmer magazine.

== Personal life ==
Cassie is married with two children and lives in Oxfordshire

== See also ==
- List of Olympic medalists in swimming (women)
