= Keri-anne Payne =

British swimmer

Keri-Anne Payne
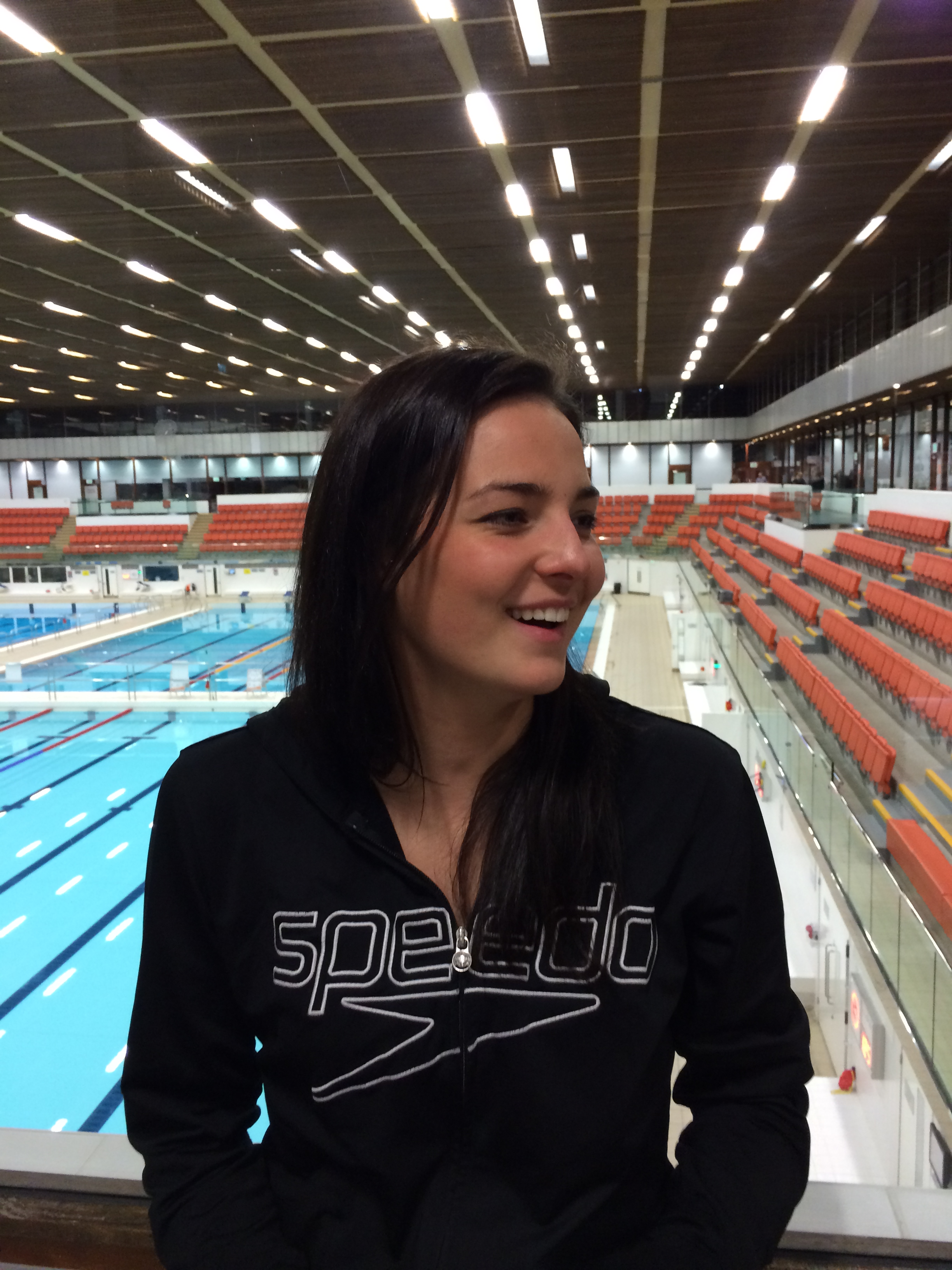
- Payne at the Royal Commonwealth Pool in Edinburgh, 2013

Personal information
- Full name: Keri-Anne Payne
- National team: Great Britain
- Born: 9 December 1987 (age 38) Johannesburg, South Africa
- Height: 1.78 m (5 ft 10 in)
- Weight: 67 kg (148 lb; 10.6 st)

Sport
- Sport: Swimming
- Strokes: Freestyle, medley
- Club: Warrender Baths SC; Stockport Metro SC
Medal record
Women's swimming
Representing Great Britain
Olympic Games
Silver medal – second place	2008 Beijing	Marathon 10 km
World Championships (LC)
Gold medal – first place	2009 Rome	10 km open water
Gold medal – first place	2011 Shanghai	10 km open water
European Championships (SC)
Gold medal – first place	2004 Vienna	400 m freestyle
Representing England
Commonwealth Games
Bronze medal – third place	2010 Delhi	400 m medley

Keri-Anne Payne (born 9 December 1987), is a South African-born British swimmer, specialising in marathon open water swimming, and long-distance freestyle swimming in the pool. She is a two-time 10-kilometre open water world champion, and an Olympic silver medallist.

== Swimming career ==
Payne was born on 9 December 1987 in Johannesburg, South Africa, to British parents, who registered her birth at the British Consulate. She started swimming aged 4, and was noticed aged 8 by British Swimming's national performance director Bill Sweetenham at a training camp in South Africa. As a result, the family returned to the UK to live in Heywood, Greater Manchester, when she was 13.

Payne attended Cardinal Langley Roman Catholic High School. Joining Stockport Metro, she has been coached since by Sean Kelly. Having broken the British junior 800-metre freestyle record in 2002, Payne's central financial support was cut after she failed to win a medal at the 2006 Commonwealth Games. As a result, Kelly suggested that she try open water swimming, allowing her to access additional central funding.

At the 2008 Summer Olympics in Beijing, she competed in the 200-metre individual medley and 400-metre individual medley swimming events, as well as the 10-kilometre open water event, in which she placed second and won a silver medal.

At the 2009 World Aquatics Championships, held in Rome, Payne won the 10-kilometre open water event. She finished first in a time of two hours, one minute and 37.1 seconds.

In 2011 in Shanghai, Payne reclaimed the World Championship in the 10 km open water event, becoming in the process the first British athlete in any sport to confirm qualification for the 2012 Summer Olympics. She took part in the 10-kilometre open water event at the 2012 Summer Olympics in London, and finished fourth, four seconds behind the winner.

Payne trained at British Swimming's Intensive Training Centre at Stockport's Grand Central Pools. Keri-anne then relocated to Edinburgh, where Payne joined Warrender Baths Club.

In 2014, she won the LEN European Open Water Swimming Cup Super Final in Castellabate, Italy.

In January 2017 Payne announced her retirement from competitive swimming

Starting in January 2018, Payne will be co-presenting The Wave on UKTV channel W.

== See also ==
- List of Olympic medalists in swimming (women)
- List of World Aquatics Championships medalists in swimming (women)
- List of Commonwealth Games medallists in swimming (women)

Awards
Preceded by Larisa Ilchenko	World Open Water Swimmer of the Year; 2009	Succeeded by Martina Grimaldi
Preceded by Ana Marcela Cunha	FINA Open Water Swimmer of the Year; 2011	Succeeded by Éva Risztov
