= Shunyi Olympic Rowing-Canoeing Park =

Olympic sports venue near Beijing, China

Coordinates: 40.1737°N 116.6866°E

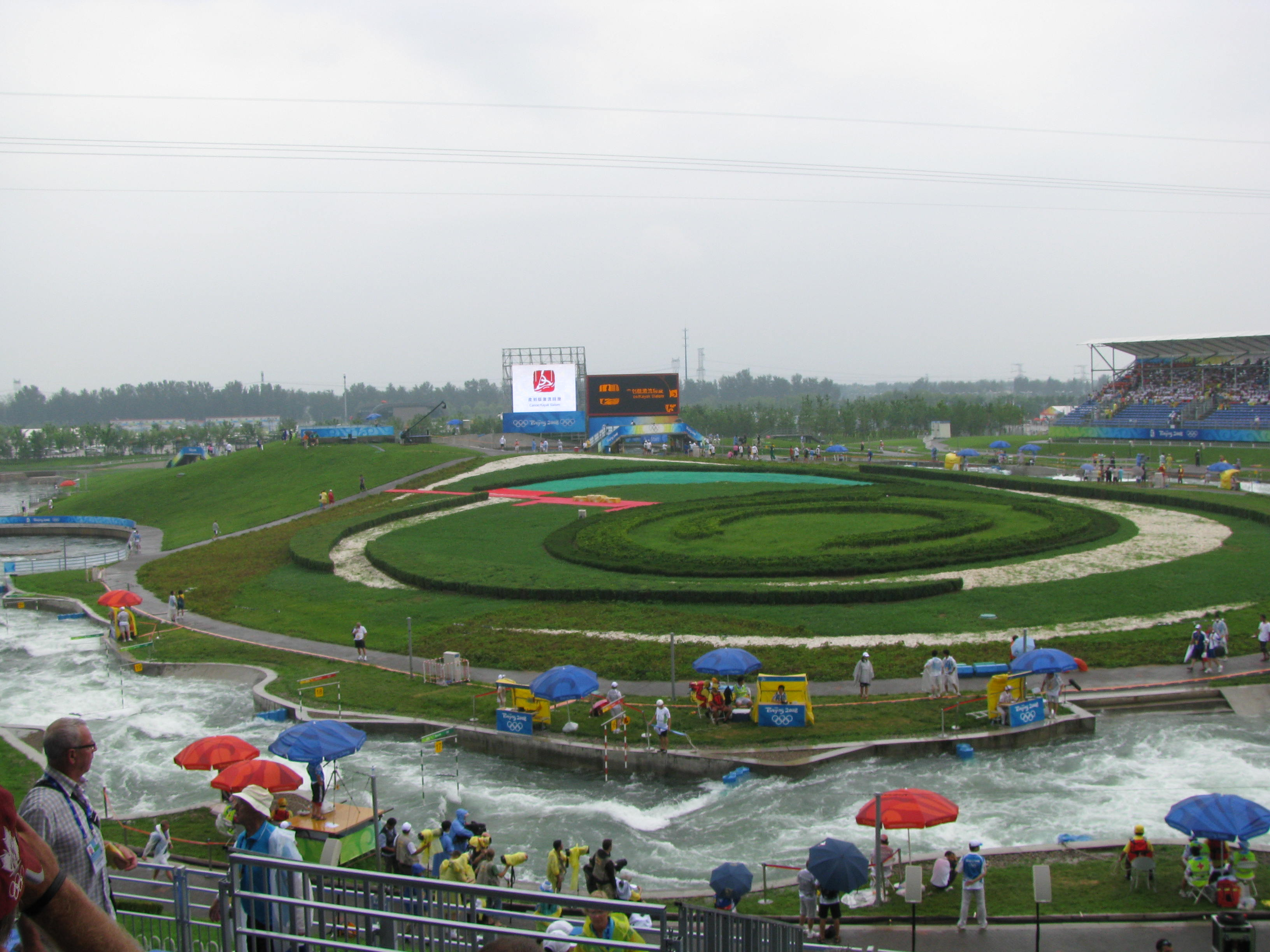
A view over the venue. Gates #16 - #19.

The Shunyi Olympic Rowing-Canoeing Park (simplified Chinese: 顺义奥林匹克水上公园; traditional Chinese: 順義奧林匹克水上公園; pinyin: Shùnyì Àolínpǐkè Shuǐshàng Gōngyuán) was built for the rowing, canoeing and 10 km open-water swimming events in the 2008 Summer Olympics. It is located in Mapo Village in the Shunyi District in Beijing.

The first competitions at the venue were held in August 2007, a year ahead of the 2008 Olympic Games for which it was built. The World Junior Rowing Championships, China Open Canoe/Kayak Slalom and China Canoe/Kayak Flatwater Open were all held in that month as part of the "Good Luck Beijing" series of sporting events. The 10 km marathon swimming event and the second qualifying event of the 2008 Summer Olympics were also held there.

== Slalom course ==
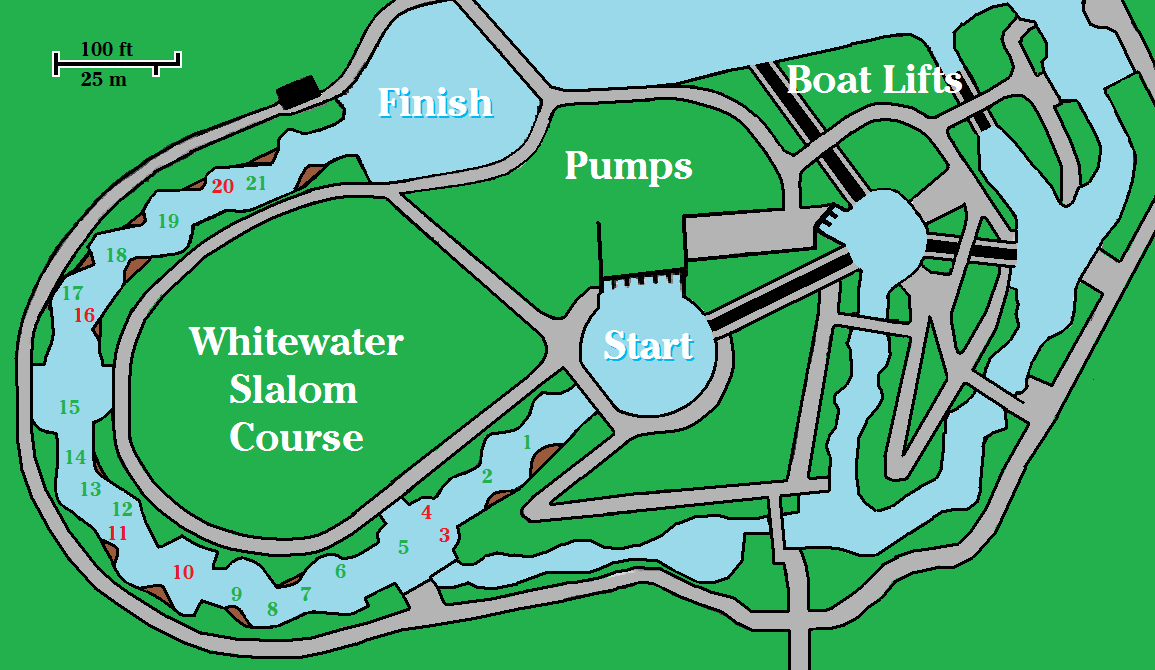
Shunyi Olympic Slalom course map

The slalom course is generally considered to be difficult, even by Olympic standards. The water speed is 7.5 meters/second. With a drop of 6.3 meters (21 ft), the 300-meter course has a 2.1% slope of 20.9 m/km (110 ft/mile).

Powered by electric pumps, the slalom course is located at the southwest corner of the long rectangular rowing pond, from which it draws its water. Its western loop is the competition course; the eastern loop, with branches, is for training and warmup. Conveyor-belt boat lifts carry paddlers to the start pool.

The green and red numbers on the map show the gate configuration used for the finals at the 2008 Olympics. There were six upstream gates (red numbers): two in right eddies, three in left eddies, and gate #10, the S-turn gate, in the middle of the stream below a midstream stack of plastic bollards. Paddlers entered gate #10 from the left side and exited from the right. The drop between gates #14 and #15 was called "stir fry".

Gates #3 and #4 were both upstream gates, side by side below the same drop. Paddlers did a figure-8 maneuver, crossing the tongue of water produced by the drop to get from #3 to #4. This difficulty was added for the finals. Earlier heats had #3 as a downstream gate above the drop, and gate #6 as an upstream gate to preserve the number of upstream gates.

Six of the green downstream gates were wider than normal (2, 5, 8, 13, 15, & 19) with each pole hanging from its own wire to allow one pole to be farther downstream than the other.

The last picture in the gallery below shows construction features which have recently become standard for such courses: vertical side walls (except for strategically placed slanted walls to dampen water oscillations), modular turbulence generators on the channel floor, and clusters of movable plastic bollards attached to the floor as water diverters. There are no concrete boulders in the channel.

=== Gallery ===
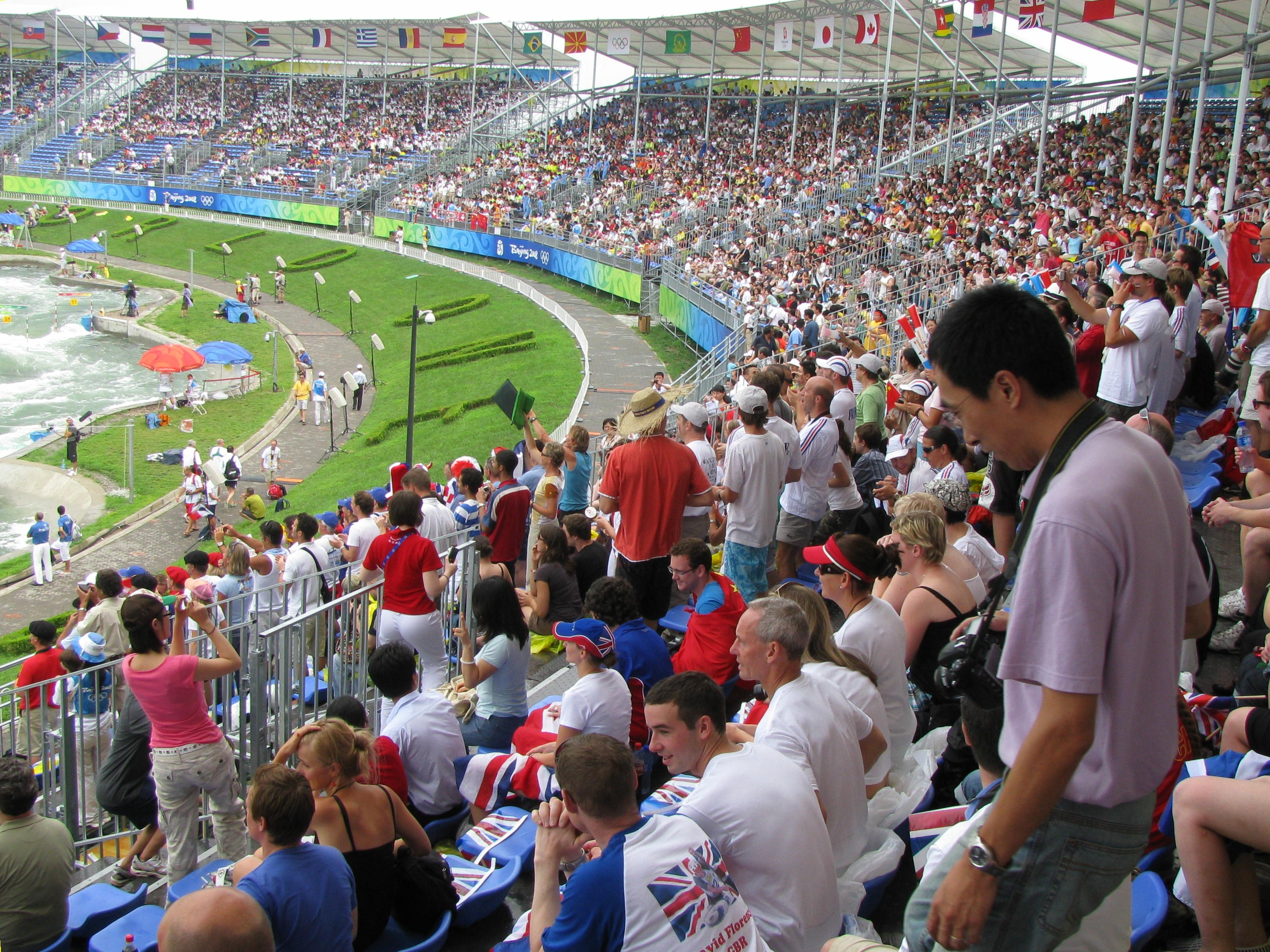
Viewing stands.

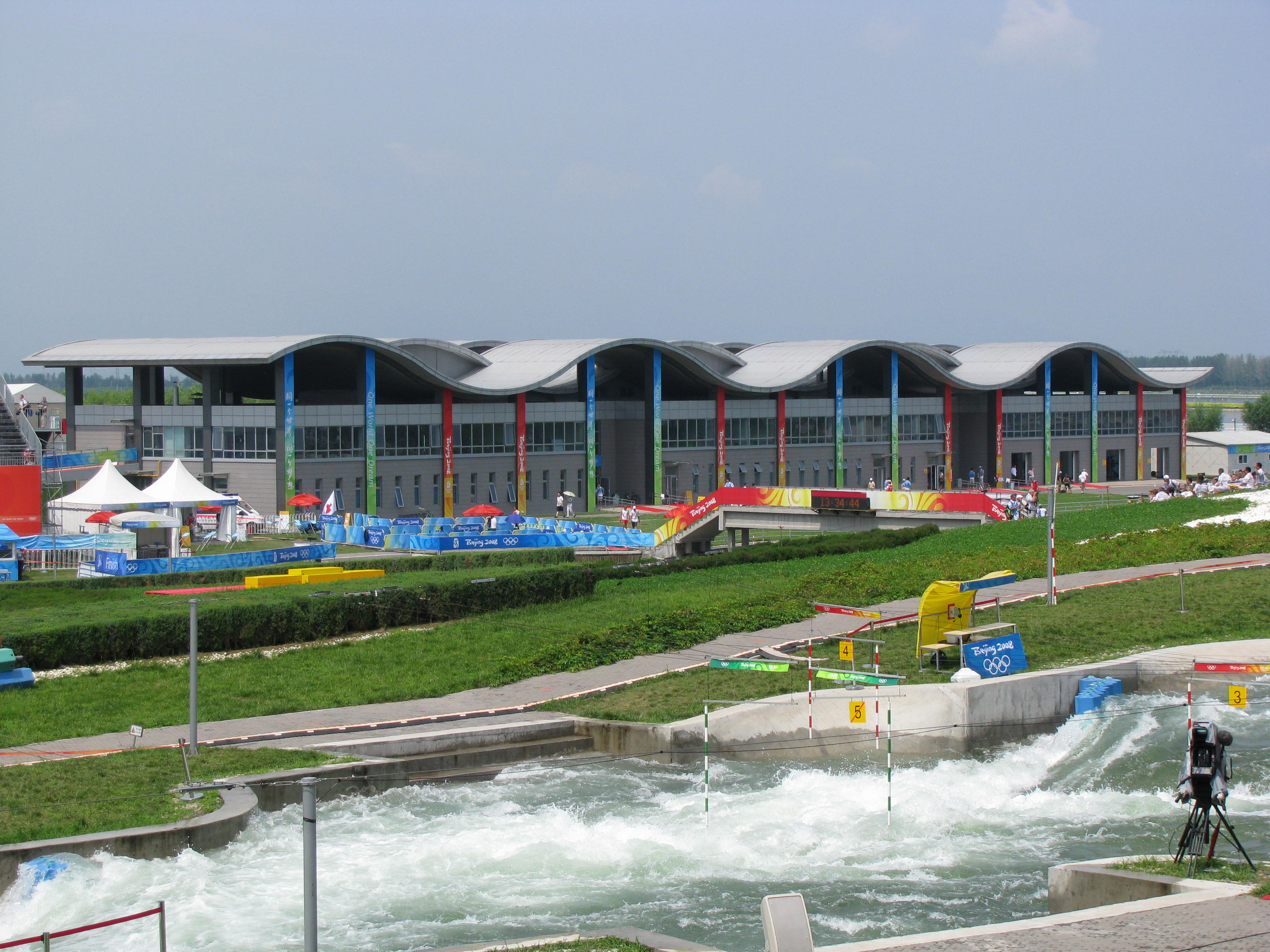
Gates #3 - #5.

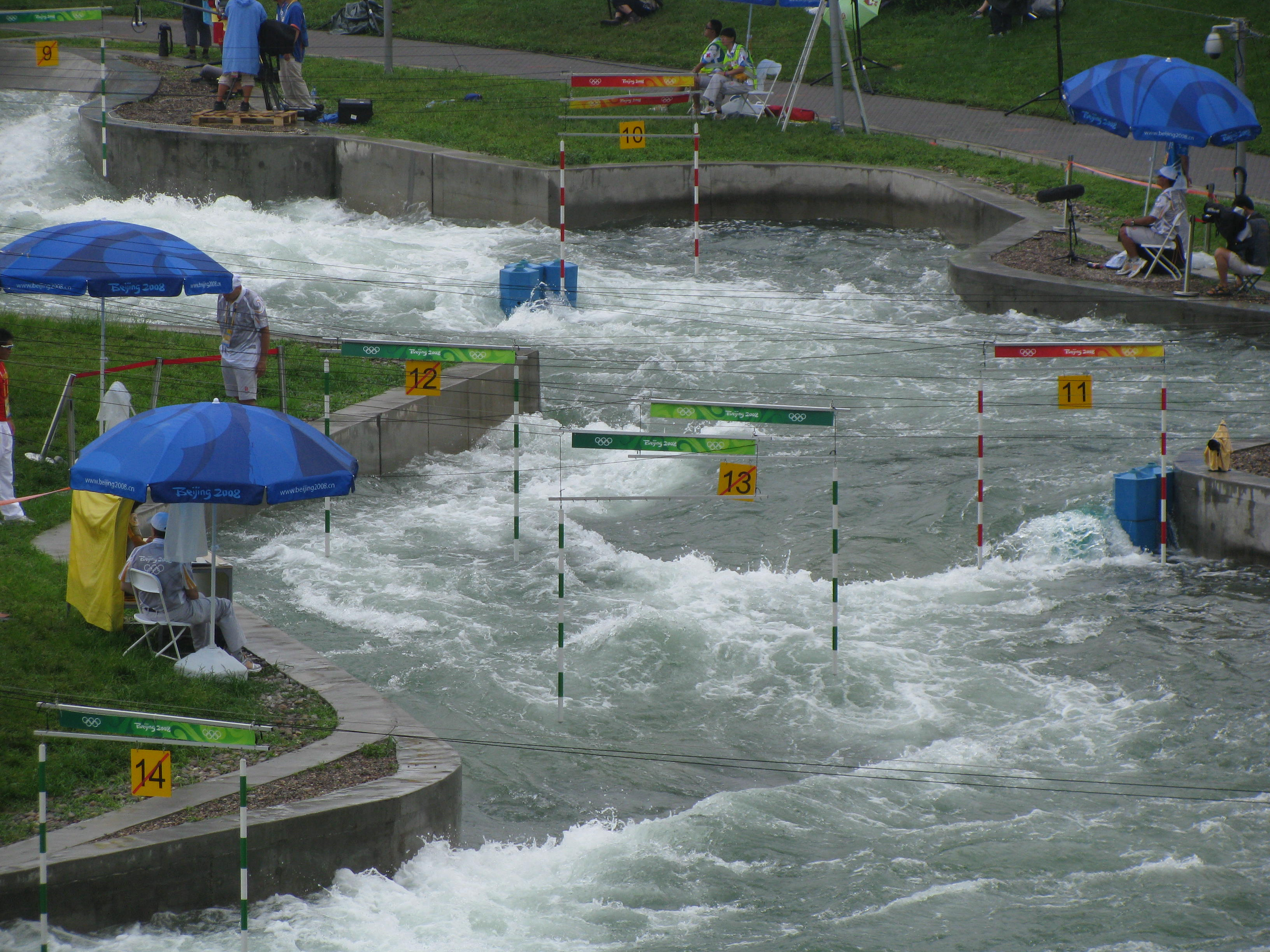
Gates #9 - #14.

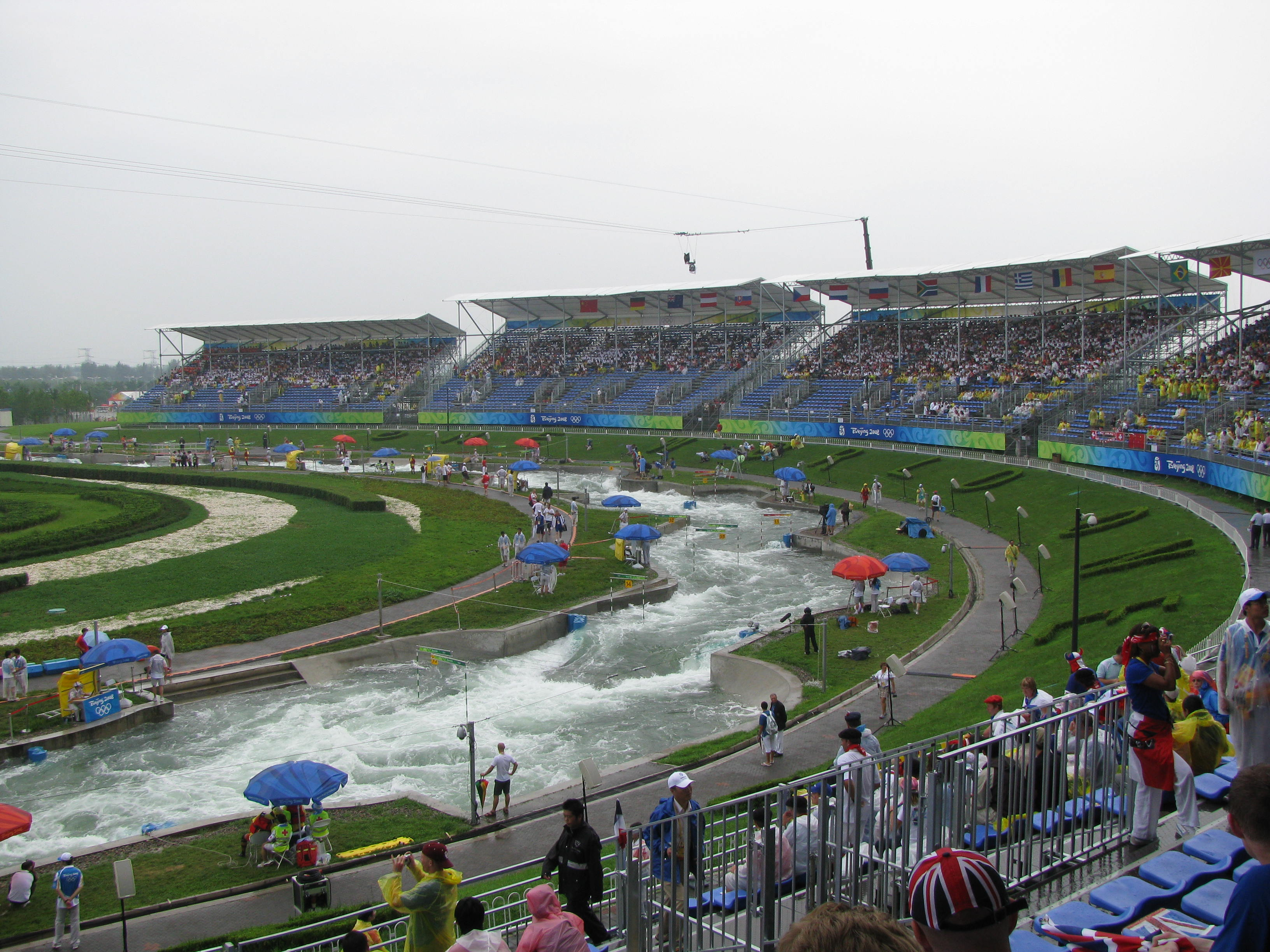
Gate #15, "stir fry."

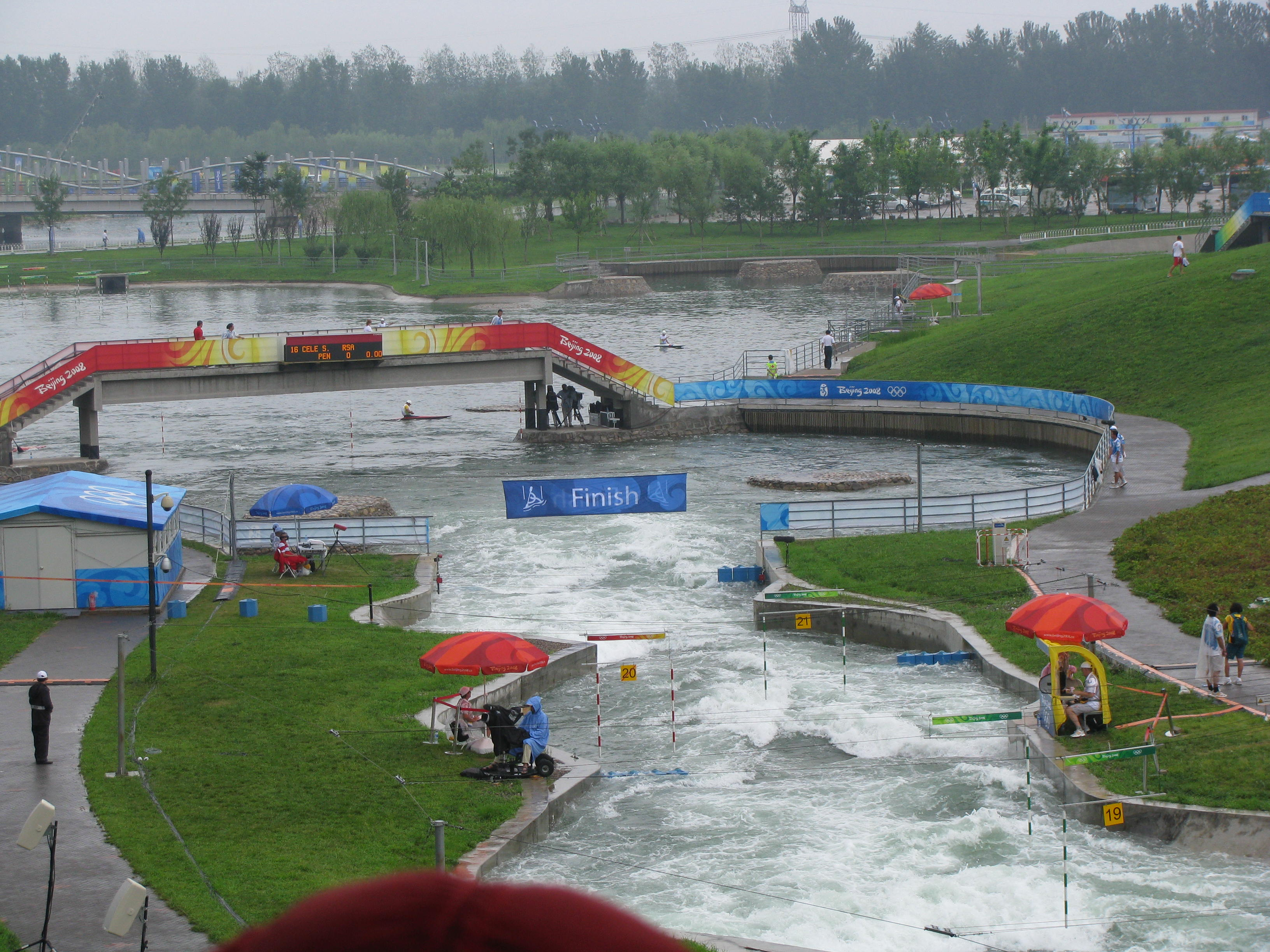
Gates #19 - #21.

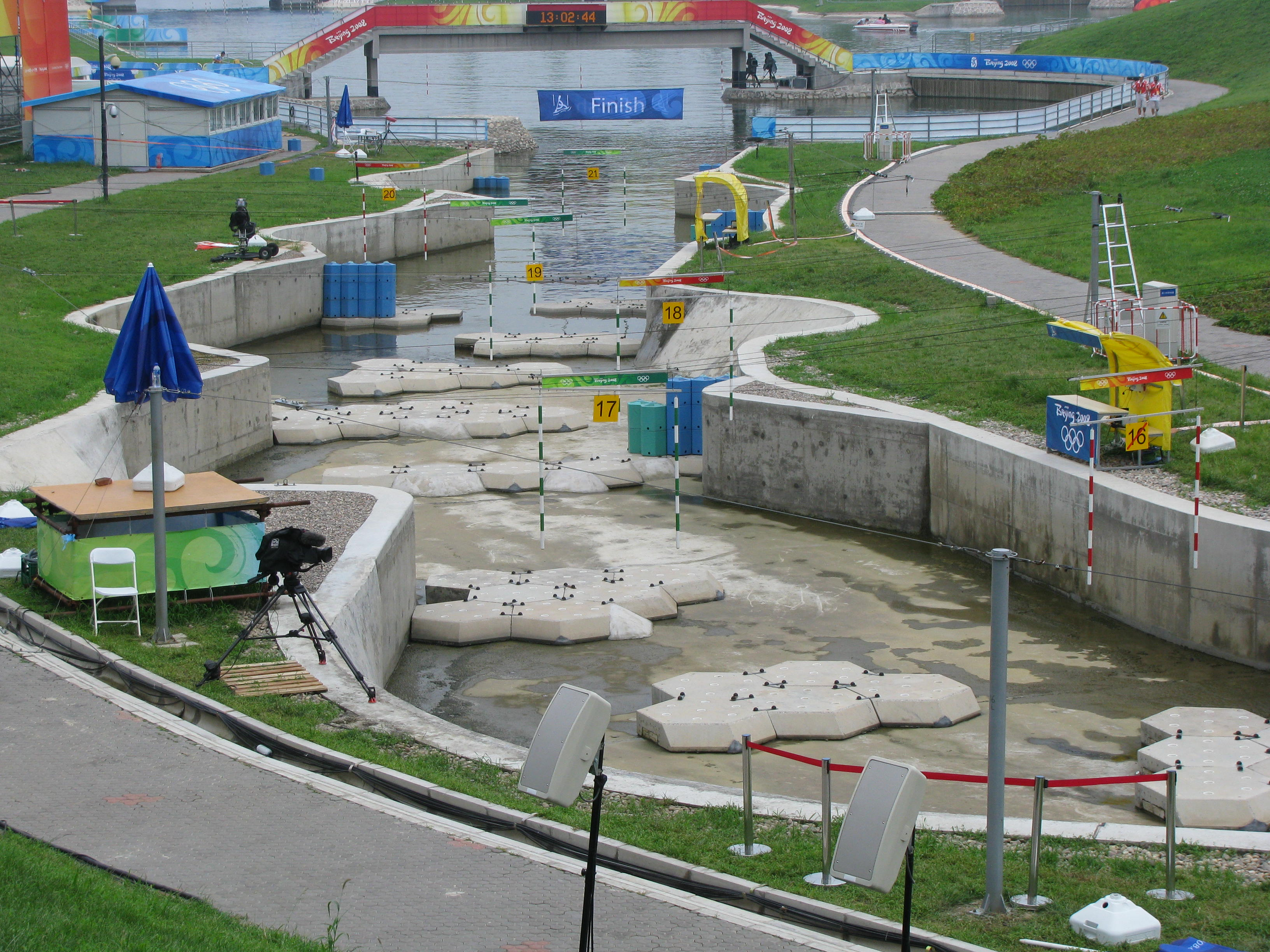
Gates #16 - #21, dry.

== Venue details ==
- Area covered: 318,500 square metres
- Fixed Seating: 1,200
- Temporary Seating: 25,800 (including 10,000 standing)
- Construction commenced: 2005
- Construction completed: 28 July 2007

== See also ==
- Venues of the 2008 Summer Olympics
