= Arthur Albiero =

American swimming coach (1973–

Biographical details
- Born: June 1973 (age 52–53); São Bernardo do Campo, Brazil
- Education: Oakland University 1996; U of Alabama MA 2003

Playing career
- 1992–1993: Cal State Bakersfield; Coach Ernie Maglischo
- 1993–1996: Oakland University; Coach Pete Hovland
- Position: Individual Medley

Coaching career (HC unless noted)
- 1996–1999: Kenyon College; Asst. to Coach Jim Steen
- 1999–2003: University of Alabama; Asst. to Don Wagner, Don Gambril
- 2003–: University of Louisville
- 2008: Romanian Olympic Team
- 2012: Portuguese Olympic Team
- 2015–2016: USA Nat. Team Staff

Accomplishments and honors

Championships
- Big East Team Championships (2010-11, Louisville Men) (2012-13, Louisville Women); AAC Championships (2014 Louisville Men, Women)

Awards
- 2xCoach of the Year (Swimswam); CSCAA 100 Greatest Coaches of the Century U. of Oakland Athletic Hall of Honor

Arthur Albiero (born 1973) is a Brazilian-born American swimming coach who was an All-American swimming competitor for Oakland University who coached swimming at the University of Louisville for over twenty years beginning in August, 2003. At the University of Louisville, he led both the men's and women's teams to championships in the Big East and AAC Conferences from 2010 to 2014 and led his women's team to a fourth place NCAA team championship in 2022–2023. Through 2024, he had twenty of his swimmers qualify for and participate in the Olympic games. Olympians he has coached include 2016 Rio Olympic gold medalist Kelsi Worrell Dahlia who competed for America in the 4x100-meter medley relay, and 2004 Athens breaststroke Olympic bronze medalist Anne Poleska who competed for Germany.

While serving as an Associate Coach at the University of Alabama from 1999 to 2003, he coached bronze medalist Anne Poleska, and 2000-2004 Olympic participant Ioan Stefan Gherghel. While Head Coach at the University of Louisville, he sent three of his swimmers, Valentin Preda, Andrei Radzionau and Adam Madarassy to the 2008 Beijing Olympics, four of his swimmers to the 2012 London Olympics, seven of his swimmers to the 2016 Rio Olympics, one of his swimmers to the 2020 Tokyo Olympics and four of his swimmers to the 2024 Paris Olympics.

== Early life ==
Albiero was born around June, 1973 in São Bernardo do Campo, in greater Sao Paulo, Brazil. He began swimming at age seven when his sister Fernanda took up swimming to help with her breathing problems and his mother Najir took him to the pool as well. At 13, he began enjoying competition, and attended a summer swim program at the University of Alabama. He attended Collegio Rio Branco, a prestigious greater Sao Paulo area school that stressed an International Education, and the teaching of English and European languages. He holds dual American and Brazilian citizenship. An internationalist in many ways, Albiero is fluent in English, his native Portuguese, and Spanish, and can read Italian and French. Many of his swimmers and the vast majority of the Olympic participants he coached would compete for countries other than the United States.

== Collegiate swimming ==
After High School graduation in Brazil, beginning in the Fall of 1992, Albiero began his Freshman year at Cal State Bakersfield in Bakersfield, California. With Albiero's help in his Freshman year, Cal State won its eighth consecutive NCAA Division II National Championship under Hall of Fame Coach Dr. Ernie Maglischo in the 1992–1993 season. Maglischo held a PHd. in Exercise Physiology and was a noted author on swimming technique. When Maglischo left Cal State for Arizona, Albiero considered a transfer to Oakland.

== Swimming for Oakland ==
In his Sophomore through Senior years, Albiero swam for Michigan's Oakland University in Auburn and Rochester Hills, under Hall of Fame Coach Pete Hovland from 1993 to 1996. He may have also received some mentoring from Oakland's women's coach at the time and future Oakland Athletic Director Tracy Huth. While at Oakland, Albiero won an individual national title in the 200-yard individual medley and competed with 800 freestyle relay teams that won national titles. By his Senior year in 1996, Albiero was a defending National champion in the 200 Individual Medley and favored to repeat at the Division II NCAA Championship's that year. According to Albiero's Coach Pete Hovland, during Albiero's time with Oakland, the team went undefeated in dual meets two years in a row, and won the Great Lakes Intercollegiate Conference Championships (GLIAC) in two years as well. Under Coach Hovland, Oakland also won consecutive Division II NCAA National Team Championships during Albiero's time with the team from 1993 to 1996.

Albiero earned three NCAA championship titles and was a Scholastic All-American in three of his years as an Oakland swimmer. He earned a total of 14 All-American honors during his time with Oakland, and as a Senior was the captain of the 1996 team that set an NCAA record for most points scored at a national championship meet. He graduated in Oakland in 1996 with a degree in psychology, while minoring in exercise physiology.

== Coaching ==
Albiero coached at Kenyon College and the University of Alabama where he was mentored by outstanding coaches before beginning his long coaching tenure at the University of Louisville.

== Kenyon College ==
In one of his first coaching stints between 1996 and 1999, Albiero was an Assistant swimming Coach at Kenyon College, a strong Division III program. At Kenyon, Albiero was mentored by Hall of Fame Coach Jim Steen. Enjoying outstanding success as a coach, Steen led the Kenyon men and women swim teams to an exceptional number of Division III NCAA championships during his tenure. While Albiero served as an Assistant coach, the men's and women's teams under Head Coach Steen captured six national championships, divided equally between the men's and women's teams. Albiero also worked at the club level, during this period, coaching a swim camp and an Oakland YMCA team.

== University of Alabama ==
Before his tenure with the University of Louisville, Albiero coached at the University of Alabama under Head Coach Don Wagner. At Alabama, Albiero also received occasional mentoring from Hall of Fame and Olympic Coach Don Gambril. Gambril was a former Alabama swim coach who was working as an Associate Alabama Athletic Director during Albiero's Coaching tenure. Albiero spent four years at Alabama, roughly between 1999 and 2003 beginning as an assistant for the university. He was Alabama's Associate head coach from 2001 to 2003. Albiero completed a master's degree in Human Performance Studies from Alabama in 2002–3.

In 2002–03, partly under Albiero's coaching guidance, the Alabama men's swim team, captured a twelfth place in national competition after placing fifth at the Southeastern Conference Championships. In 2002–3, the women took 15th place in the NCAA meet.

== University of Louisville ==
Albiero began coaching swimming at the University of Louisville around age 29 in August, 2003. While coaching Louisville, he and his wife Amy, a former Oakland competitive swimmer, coached the Cardinal Aquatics club, an age-group team. In the 2021–2 season, the University of Louisville men earned a second-place finish in the Atlantic Coast Conference Championship. The Louisville women earned a third place conference finish. During that season, the Louisville women placed sixth at the NCAA Championship. In the 2013–14 season, Albiero brought the Cardinal men and women swim teams to a championship at the American Athletic Conference.

From 2009 to 2014, Rachel Komisarz, a 2004 Olympic freestyle gold medalist, worked as an Assistant coach with Albiero. Albiero, in 2010–11, led both the men's and women's swim teams to the Big East Conference title with the women taking their first conference championship. He led Louisville men's swimming to another Big East Conference Championship in 2011–12. The Louisville men's team placed second in the Big East Conference in 2015–16. In the banner year of 2019, the men's team finished fifth at the NCAA National, and the Louisville women captured a fourth place.

At another high point in 2022–23, Albiero's Louisville women's swim and diving team won a trophy by finishing fourth at the NCAA Championships. Under Albiero's reign, both the Louisville men's and women's swim and diving teams have had several years with national ratings in the top 20, and a few in the top 10.

== Outstanding swimmers and Olympians ==
Albiero's more outstanding swimmers while at Alabama included Ioan Stefan Gherghel, who repeated as an NCAA Champion twice. A 2000 and 2004 Olympian, Gherghel set an Alabama collegiate swimming record in the 200-butterfly while taking his second NCAA title. Albiero also coached Anne Poleska who was a bronze medalist in the 2004 Athens Olympics in the 200-meter breaststroke.

At the University of Louisville, in 2007–8, Albiero had three of his swimmers compete in the 2008 Beijing Olympics. In that year, he was tapped to work as a member of the Olympic coaching staff for Romania. At the 2008 Olympics, Albiero's Louisville swimmers Adam Madarassy competed for Hungary, Andrei Radzionau competed for Belarus, and Valentin Preda competed for Romania.

Louisville sent four swimmers to the 2012 Olympics. These included Brazilian team member Joao de Lucca, Hungarian team member Eszter Povazsay, and Portuguese team members Carlos Almeida (swimmer) and Pedro Oliveira. With his international coaching experience, and Portuguese fluency, Albiero coached Portugal's swim team at the London 2012 Olympic Games. Albiero was again named Swimswam Magazine's National Coach of the Year in 2012.

2016 Olympic participants Albiero coached at Louisville included American gold medalist Kelsi Worrell, Marcelo Acosta, Carlos Claverie, Joao de Lucca, Tanja Kylliainen, Andrea Kneppers and Grigory Tarasevich. Albiero sent a single swimmer to the 2020 Olympics, Zach Harting, which took place in 2021 due to COVID. In the 2024 Paris Olympics, Albiero's son Nick qualified for the Brazilian team but did not compete. Swim and diving competitors at the 2024 Paris Olympics coached by Albiero at the University of Louisville included Israeli team member Denis Loktev, Polish team member Bartosz Piszczorowicz, Kyrgyzstani team member Denis Petrashov, Brazilian team member Murilo Sartori, and Ilia Sibirtsev who swam the 400 and 800 freestyle for Uzbekistan.

Albiero's son Nick was an outstanding swimmer for Louisville by 2020. An accomplished collegiate swimmer, and a member of the U.S. National team, he made the Brazilian Olympic team in the 200 butterfly in 2024.

== Service to the swimming community ==
For the London 2012 Olympic Games, Albiero accepted a position as the Portuguese Olympic coach. In 2015, while at Louisville, Albiero served on the USA Coaching Staff, coaching the American team at the Pan American Games. Among his more significant achievements as Louisville swim coach, Albiero greatly expanded scholarship opportunities, and oversaw the building of the new Ralph Wright Natatorium. He served as the President of College Swimming and Diving Coaches Association of America (CSCAA) and testified before the House Judiciary Committee in 2025 concerning Anti-trust law.

Albiero married Amy Comerford on April 27, 1996, a former outstanding swimmer at Oakland University who has also coached and would become a member of the Oakland University Athletic Hall of Honor. Their children are Estefan, Nicolas, an accomplished competitive swimmer for Louisville, and Gabriela, who also swam for Louisville.

== Honors ==
Around the 2009-2011 swim seasons, Albiero was twice named the Big East Conference Coach of the Year. He became a member of the University of Oakland Athletic Hall of Honor in 2012. He was twice honored as the National Coach of the Year by Swimswam Magazine. In a unique honor, he became a member of the College Swimming and Diving Coaches Association of America's 100 greatest coaches of the Century in 2021.

== See also ==
- List of American Athletic Conference champions
