= Sean Peters =

American swimmer and coach (1972)

Sean M. Peters
Biographical details
- Born: November 30, 1971 (age 54); Clinton Township, Michigan, U.S.
- Education: Oakland University

Playing career
- 1991–1994: Oakland University; Coached by Pete Hovland
- Positions: freestyle, distance

Coaching career (HC unless noted)
- Oakland University Asst. Coach: 1994–1997
- Wayne State: 1997–Present

Accomplishments and honors

Championships
- National NCAA Championship (2011–2012 Wayne State Women); 11 GLIAC Championships (2006–2018 Wayne State Women); 9 GLIAC Championships (2003–2014 Wayne State Men)

Awards
- CSCAA Greatest 100 College Coaches, 2021

Sean M. Peters (born November 30, 1971) was an All American competitive swimmer for Oakland University and is currently the head coach for men’s and women’s swimming and diving at Wayne State University. During his first twenty-eight years as a Wayne State coach from 1997 to 2025, he led the 2011–12 Women's team to a National NCAA Championship, led the men's and women's teams to a combined total of 20 Great Lakes Intercollegiate Athletic Conference (GLIAC) championships. During his coaching tenure, Wayne State Swimmers swimmers broke every standing varsity collegiate record for both the men's and women's teams.

Peters was born November 30, 1971 in Clinton Township, Michigan. He graduated Fraser High School in 1990. Swimming for Fraser as a Junior at the March, 1989 Class A Michigan State Meet, he placed fifth in the 50 freestyle with a 21.99 and tenth in the 100-freestyle with a 48.73.

== Oakland University ==
From 1991 to 1994, Peters swam for Oakland University in Rochester, Michigan, under Head Coach Pete Hovland and became an NCAA National Champion four times, with his first championship coming as a member of 1993's 200 and 400 Freestyle Relay teams. In 1994, Peters was team captain and that year helped lead the team to a national title, swimming as anchor to the 200 Medley Championship Relay team. Peters was named an All-American 13 times during his collegiate career at Oakland.

While at Oakland, he completed a BS in environmental health. He and his wife, Kelly, were married in August 2004 and as of 2024 resided in Beverly Hills, Michigan with their daughter, Claire.

== Coaching ==
Peters served as an assistant coach for the swimming teams at Oakland University from 1994–1997 under Pete Hovland as the Men's Head Coach. At Oakland, Peters had a small part in leading the men's team to three Division II national championships from 1995–1997, though the men's team also took the NCAA National Championship in 1994, while Peters was still competing for the team, but may have worked as a student coach. From 1990–1994, the Oakland University Women's swimming team also won the NCAA National championship, though Peters was not yet serving as a coach.

=== Wayne State University ===
Peters coached at Wayne State University where between 1997–2025 he led the 2011–12 Women's team to a National NCAA Championship, the team's first title since 1989. When he first came to Wayne State, he worked initially as an Assistant Coach and taught in the Masters in Arts Teaching program for Science and Math. He continued to coach after 2025. During his coaching tenure, he led Wayne State women's team to 11 Great Lakes Intercollegiate Athletic Conference (GLIAC) Championships from 2006–2018. From 2003–2014, he led the Wayne State men's team to nine GLIAC titles. He was named GLIAC conference Women's Swimming Coach of the year in ten years, including 2006–8, 2010–12, 2014–2016, and 2018. He was also named the GLIAC Men's Swimming Coach of the Year in ten years including 2002–7, 2009, 2011, and 2013–14. Peters has been honored with six NCAA Division II Coach of the Year Awards from the CSCAA. During Peters' tenure as coach, every Wayne State swimming record for both the men's and women's varsity teams have been bettered.

During his first twenty-eight years at Wayne State through 2025, Peters mentored nearly 300 All-Americans in first team individual events, and just over 220 All Americans who were Second Team and/or Honorable Mention individual All-Americans in individual events. Peter had just over twenty Wayne State swimmers admitted to the Wayne State Athlete's Hall of Fame. His Wayne State Hall of Fame members included six divers and eighteen swimmers, with the 2023 Hall of Fame members consisting of Joaquin Abascal Gallegos, Gloria Martinez Perez and Elizabeth Rawlings, and the more recent 2024 addition of Ellyson Maleski.

=== Honors ===
Peters was inducted into College Swimming Coaches Association of America’s Top 100 College Swim and Dive Coaches of the past 100 years in December, 2021. He was named the GLIAC conference Women's Swimming Coach of the year in ten years, as well as the GLIAC Men's Swimming Coach of the year for in ten years. By 2025, he was an CSCAA Division II Coach of the Year in six years with four years as the Women's Coach of the Year and two as the CSCAA Men's Coach of the Year.
