= Swimming at the 2016 European Aquatics Championships – Women's 4 × 200 metre freestyle relay =

Women's 4 × 200 metre freestyle relay at the 2016 European Aquatics Championships
- Dates: 19 May
- Competitors: 60 from 13 nations
- Winning time: 7:51.63

Medalists
gold medal	Zsuzsanna Jakabos; Evelyn Verrasztó; Boglárka Kapás; Katinka Hosszú	Hungary
silver medal	Melani Costa; Patricia Castro; Fatima Gallardo Carapeto; Mireia Belmonte	Spain
bronze medal	Andrea Kneppers; Esmee Vermeulen; Robin Neumann; Femke Heemskerk	Netherlands

The Women's 4 × 200 metre freestyle relay competition of the 2016 European Aquatics Championships was held on 19 May 2016.

== Records ==
Prior to the competition, the existing world, European and championship records were as follows.

	Nation	Time	Location	Date
World record	China	7:42.08	Rome	30 July 2009
European record	Great Britain	7:45.51	Rome	30 July 2009
Championship record	Italy	7:50.53	Berlin	21 August 2014

== Results ==
=== Heats ===
The heats were held at 11:32.

Rank	Heat	Lane	Nation	Swimmers	Time	Notes
1	1	5	Spain	Patricia Castro (1:58.61); Fatima Gallardo Carapeto (1:59.15); Melani Costa (1:58.44); Africa Zamorano Sanz (2:01.00)	7:57.20	Q
2	1	3	Hungary	Evelyn Verrasztó (1:58.55); Boglárka Kapás (2:01.18); Ajna Késely (1:58.96); Zsuzsanna Jakabos (1:59.25)	7:57.94	Q
3	1	6	Netherlands	Andrea Kneppers (2:00.53); Esmee Vermeulen (1:58.55); Marrit Steenbergen (1:59.98); Robin Neumann (1:59.43)	7:58.49	Q
4	2	2	Italy	Stefania Pirozzi (2:00.80); Martina De Memme (2:00.43); Erica Musso (1:59.24); Alice Mizzau (1:59.05)	7:59.52	Q
5	2	6	Great Britain	Georgia Coates (2:00.10); Camilla Hattersley (1:59.57); Ellie Faulkner (2:00.68); Hannah Miley (1:59.38)	7:59.73	Q
6	1	2	Slovenia	Janja Šegel (1:59.94); Tjasa Pintar (2:00.43); Nastja Govejšek (2:02.56); Anja Klinar (2:00.03)	8:02.96	Q
7	2	3	Sweden	Ida Marko-Varga (2:01.11); Stina Gardell (2:00.81); Louise Hansson (2:01.39); Henriette Stenkvist (2:01.58)	8:04.89	Q
8	1	4	Belgium	Juliette Casini (2:02.73); Lotte Goris (1:59.47); Camille Bouden (2:04.57); Valentine Dumont (2:00.73)	8:07.50	Q
9	1	7	France	Camille Gheorghiu (2:00.93); Margaux Fabre (2:00.72); Mathilde Cini (2:04.39); Cloé Hache (2:01.47)	8:07.51	
10	2	4	Switzerland	Noemi Girardet (2:01.48); Maria Ugolkova (2:00.28); Martina van Berkel (2:03.55); Danielle Carmen Villars (2:04.60)	8:09.91	
11	2	5	Austria	Lisa Zaiser (2:02.23); Joerdis Steinegger (2:01.70); Claudia Hufnagl (2:03.61); Julia Kukla (2:02.41)	8:09.95	
12	2	1	Finland	Hanna-Maria Seppälä (2:05.74); Laura Lajunen (2:09.57); Anniina Ala-Seppälä (2:04.57); Aino Otava (2:06.26)	8:26.14	
	2	7	Poland	Diana Sokołowska (2:01.49); Paula Żukowska; Monika Czerniak; Wioletta Orczykowska	DSQ	

=== Final ===
The final was held at 19:45.

Rank	Lane	Nation	Swimmers	Time	Notes
1st place, gold medalist(s)	5	Hungary	Zsuzsanna Jakabos (1:58.60); Evelyn Verrasztó (1:58.16); Boglárka Kapás (1:58.22); Katinka Hosszú (1:56.65)	7:51.63	
2nd place, silver medalist(s)	4	Spain	Melani Costa (1:58.69); Patricia Castro (1:58.21); Fatima Gallardo Carapeto (1:58.63); Mireia Belmonte (1:57.85)	7:53.38	
3rd place, bronze medalist(s)	3	Netherlands	Andrea Kneppers (2:00.19); Esmee Vermeulen (1:58.53); Robin Neumann (1:59.75); Femke Heemskerk (1:55.16)	7:53.63	
4	2	Great Britain	Jazmin Carlin (1:57.83); Siobhan-Marie O'Connor (1:57.46); Hannah Miley (2:00.04); Georgia Coates (1:58.64)	7:53.97	
5	6	Italy	Alice Mizzau (1:59.02); Erica Musso (1:59.57); Stefania Pirozzi (1:59.82); Federica Pellegrini (1:56.38)	7:54.79	
6	1	Sweden	Sarah Sjöström (1:55.30); Stina Gardell (2:00.59); Louise Hansson (2:00.02); Ida Marko-Varga (1:59.83)	7:55.74	
7	8	Belgium	Juliette Casini (2:00.82); Lotte Goris (1:59.26); Kimberly Buys (2:01.91); Valentine Dumont (2:00.68)	8:02.67	
8	7	Slovenia	Janja Šegel (2:00.59); Anja Klinar (1:59.73); Tjasa Pintar (1:59.99); Nastja Govejšek (2:02.87)	8:03.18	
