= Valentin Preda =

Romanian swimmer (born 1985)

Personal information
- Full name: Valentin Preda
- Nickname: Vali
- Nationality: Romania
- Born: 24 May 1985 (age 41) Brăila, Romania
- Height: 1.96 m (6 ft 5 in)
- Weight: 72 kg (159 lb)

Sport
- Sport: Swimming
- Strokes: Breaststroke
- Club: SCM Piteşti
- College team: University of Louisville (U.S.)
- Coach: Arthur Albiero (U. of Louisville)

Valentin "Vali" Preda (born 24 May 1985, in Brăila) is a Romanian swimmer who specialized in breaststroke events. He represented his nation Romania at the 2008 Summer Olympics, and has also claimed multiple Romanian national records in the breaststroke (both 100 and 200 m), and medley relays (both 200 and 400 m).

Preda is a former member of the swimming team for the University of Louisville in Louisville, Kentucky, where he competed and trained under Head Coach Arthur Albiero, and completed an undergraduate degree in exercise science.

== 2008 European Aquatics Championships ==
Leading up to the 2008 Olympic Games, Preda scored an eighteenth-place time in 1:02.16 (100 m breaststroke) to beat the FINA B-cut (1:03.72) at the European Championships five months earlier in Eindhoven, Netherlands.

== 2008 Olympics ==
Preda competed for Romania in two swimming events at the 2008 Summer Olympics in Beijing. In the 100 m breaststroke, Preda fired off a 1:01.77 to drop his own Romanian record on a tech body suit by 0.11 of a second and tie for third with Sweden's Jonas Andersson in heat five, but failed to advance to the semifinals, finishing thirty-first overall in the prelims.

In his second 2008 Olympic event, Preda teamed up with Răzvan Florea, Ioan Gherghel, and Norbert Trandafir in the 4 × 100 m medley relay. Swimming the breaststroke leg in heat one, Preda recorded a split of 1:01.41, before the Romanian foursome finished the race in fifth position and thirteenth overall with a new national record of 3:38.00.
