= Gregg Parini =

American swim coach (1960 –)

Biographical details
- Born: August 24, 1960 (age 66)
- Education: Kenyon College BA 1982; Michigan State MA 1984

Playing career
- 1978–1982: Kenyon College; Jim Steen, Coach
- Positions: Freestyle; Backstroke water polo

Coaching career (HC unless noted)
- 1984–85: Michigan State University (Asst. Coach Women)
- 1985–1986: East Lansing High School
- 1986–1987: University of Mount Union; Alliance, Ohio
- 1987–: Denison University; Men & Women

Accomplishments and honors

Championships
- 7 NCAA Div. III Championships as of 2023 (Denison Women 2001, 2003) (Denison Men 2011–2012, 2016, 2018, 2019)

Awards
- Charles Brickman Teaching Award 2007; National Collegiate & Scholastic Trophy 2011; 9 x NCAA Div. III Coach of the Year; CSCAA 100 Greatest Coaches 2021

Joseph Gregg Parini (born August 24, 1960) is an American former competitive swimmer for Kenyon College who served as a swim coach for Denison University beginning in 1987. As of 2025, he had led Denison's men's and women's teams to seven National Collegiate Athletic Association (NCAA) Division III championships, seventeen second-place NCAA finishes, and 39 years with the men's or women's teams rated nationally in the top ten.

== Early life ==
Parini was born August 24, 1960, to Mr. and Mrs. Joseph A. Parini. He grew up in Grand Rapids, Michigan, and attended Michigan's East Grand Rapids High School where he graduated in 1978. Swimming for East Grand Rapids, at the O-K Red Swimming Championships in March 1977, he won the 200 Medley Relay in a conference record time of 1:43.303, and placed second in both the 200 Individual Medley, and the 100 backstroke. By 1979, as a strong multi-stroke competitor, he held the conference record for the 200 IM with a time of 2:05.9. Swimming for East Grand Rapids at the Detroit News Invitational Swim Meet in February, 1978, Parini's relay team placed first in the 200 yard Medley Relay. In 1977 Parini's 200-yard East Grand Rapids Medley Relay team held the fastest time in the region with a 1:42.3.

== Kenyon College ==
Graduating in 1982, Parini attended Kenyon College from the fall of 1978 through 1982 where he studied Psychology and Theology (where his stepson, Andrew Irvin, also graduated in 2008). In 1979, Parini, as a swimmer for Kenyon College under Coach Jim Steen was part of the college's NCAA national championship team. An exceptional mentor as Head Coach, Steen had at least five of his swimmers become collegiate coaches, including John Howell, who coached Emory University to an NCAA National Championship.

One of three captains in 1981 through 1982, Parini helped the team win its third NCAA National Title. He received All-American honors eighteen times, was an NCAA National Champion in seven instances, and set five division three national records during his college years. In 1981, he was a Kenyon swim team MVP, and in 1982, was an Athlete of the Year. At Kenyon, he was a championship sprinter, winning two successive titles in the 50-yard freestyle, and one in the 100-yard freestyle. He became the first Division III swimmer to finish the 50-yard freestyle below the 21 second mark. While at Kenyon, Parini was chosen All Mid-East Conference in Water Polo in three years.

== Coaching ==
In 1984, Parini was an Assistant Coach at Michigan State University in Lansing, Michigan for about a year under Coach Dick Fetters, who started as Head Coach at Michigan State in 1970. An accomplished coach, Fetter produced 19 individual Big Ten Conference champions, and five national champions in individual events during his tenure. While at Michigan State, Parini received a Masters in counseling psychology, completing the degree around 1986. He briefly left his graduate studies to work at a private psychiatric hospital, and seriously considered the priesthood before focusing on swim coaching as a career.

He coached swimming at East Lansing High School from August 1985 – August 1986, and at Alliance, Ohio's Mount Union College from August 1986 – July 1987. He coached at Columbus Ohio's Upper Arlington Swim Club, an outstanding program within commuting distance of Denison University.

== Coaching Denison University ==
Parini began coaching Denison University's men's and women's teams in 1987. By 2023, collectively the men and women's teams had won seven national championships, and had 13 second-place finishes in NCAA national competition. The combined men's and women's teams had 53 successive national finishes in the top ten.

In 2001, Denison women's team won their first NCAA national championship under Parini's tenure defeating a dominant Kenyon team that had captured seventeen successive NCAA national championships. They won their second championship in 2023.

Parini's Denison men's team won their first NCAA National Championship in 2011, defeating Kenyon College, in a very close and unexpected victory over a dominating Kenyon team that had captured 31 successive NCAA championships. In September, 2012, the Denison swim team began working out at a new campus aquatics facility.

The men's team won their second NCAA National Championship in 2012, again beating an outstanding Kenyon team, with the men's swimmers setting six new NCAA records. By 2012, both the men's and women's teams had won five straight North Coast Atlantic Conference (NCAC) championships. The Denison men's swimming team won the NCAA national championship again in 2016, 2018, and 2019.

Parini was remembered by many of his Denison swimmers as being a good communicator and a strong motivator, yet not overbearing, or abusive. He claimed to focus on one season at a time, and tried to limit the amount of stress on his swimmers, while still building a strong desire to achieve for the team.

Parini is a member of United States Swimming and the College Swimming Coaches Association of America. He is married to Alice Freitas Parini, and the couple, who lived in Granville, Ohio near the Denison campus as of 2025, have children.

== Honors ==
Parini was admitted to Kenyon's Hall of Fame in 2002. The Collegiate Swimming Coaches Association of America (CSCAA) honored him with the National Collegiate and Scholastic Trophy, their greatest honor in 2011, and in 2021 he was recognized on CSCAA's list of the 100 Greatest Coaches of the last 100 years. He was voted to the CSCAA Hall of Fame 2025 Class for his accomplishments as a swimmer at Kenyon College.

Highly recognized by the NCAA as an accomplished national competitor, he was made an NCAA Division III Coach of the year in nine separate years.

Away from the pool and inside the classroom, Denison University honored him with the Charles A. Brickman Teaching Award in 2007.
