= Colleen Murphy (swim coach) =

American swimming coach

Current position
- Team: Air Force Falcons

Biographical details
- Born: March 11, 1975 (age 51); Flint, Michigan
- Education: Oakland University (BA, 1997); University of Kentucky (MA)

Playing career
- 1993–1997: Oakland
- Positions: freestyle, backstroke

Coaching career (HC unless noted)
- 1997–1999: Wildcat Aquatics
- 2001–2002: Iowa (assistant)
- 2002–2005: Truman
- 2007–2012: Xavier College Prep
- 2010–2011: Phoenix Swim Club
- 2012–2016: Air Force (assistant)
- 2016–present: U.S. Air Force Academy

Accomplishments and honors

Championships
- 5 Arizona State Championships (Xavier College Prep); 3 NCAA Division II Championships 2003–2005 (Truman State Women)

Awards
- Oakland University Hall of Fame '94; NCAA Div. II Coach of Year 2003–05 (Truman); CSCAA Coach of the Century

Records
- 13 dual wins .77 Win % (Air Force 2019–20)

Colleen Renee Murphy is an American swimming coach who was an all American swimmer for Michigan's Oakland University. She was the first female swimming coach to ever win a National Championship as she did in three successive years as the women's coach at Truman State from 2002 to 2005, and also win an NCAA national championship as a collegiate swimmer as she did for Oakland University in the 1994 season. After beginning as the swim coach at the U.S. Air Force Academy in 2012, she led the team to break every standing school record and in the 2019–20 season, led the team to 13 dual meet wins, a .722 winning percentage, and the Western Athletic Conference Championship.

== Early life and swimming ==
Colleen Murphy was born in the greater Flint, Michigan area on March 11, 1975, to the former Mary Christine Linker and Dennis James Murphy, a firefighter for the Flint Fire Department. Her father was an avid golfer, and served in the Air Force during the Viet Nam era from 1964 to 1968.

Growing up in greater Flint, Michigan, Colleen attended Gates Elementary School in nearby Davison, and was swimming competitively by the age of eleven. She swam in a 200 medley relay for Powers Catholic High School in October 1989 in a regular meet against Grand Blanc High School where the team finished with a time of 2:02.23. In November, 1989, Murphy was part of a Prep School Honor Roll for the Flint Journal, for swimming a 50 freestyle for Powers High in a time of 28.20.

=== Grand Blanc High ===
For most of her High School career, Murphy swam for the Grand Blanc High School Bobcats in Grand Blanc, Michigan, under Coach Craig Oldham, where she helped lead Grand Blanc to a sixth-place team finish at the finals of the Michigan State Championships in 1992.

By the fall of the 1991 season, Grand Blanc had finished sixth at the Battle Creek Lakeview Invitational, a meet that featured some of the strongest teams in the Midwest. In the Fall of 1991, the Grand Blanc's women's team had fifty members, including divers, an unusually large number for a women's High School team. Oldham included weight training in the training regiment for his women's team, and encouraged his swimmers to compete in multiple strokes, as did Murphy, qualifying in 1991 for the Michigan State Meet in a backstroke event. In August, 1992, she competed on a winning 200 medley relay team in the 15–17 age group that set a time of 1:58.18, a winning 200 freestyle relay team that set a time of 1:50.27, and swam a 100-backstroke in 1:03.65. Murphy also competed as a golfer while at Grand Blanc, and in July 1953 received an Honorable Mention in the Flint Journal for her play that year. She graduated Grand Blanc in 1993.

== Oakland University ==
As a swimmer at Oakland University beginning in September, 1993, Murphy was an All-American five times and an Academic All-American on three occasions. As only a Freshman in 1994 she earned points as a swimmer, helping the strong Oakland team under Coach Tracy Huth take the NCAA Division II Championship in Canton, Ohio with the U.S. Air Force swim team coached by Casey Converse, taking second. For the strong Oakland team, 1994 marked their fifth consecutive NCAA Division II National Championship, but it was Murphy's first and only NCAA Division II championship swimming for the team. Oakland earned an 8–2 record in 1993–94, and also won the Great Lakes Intercollegiate Athletic Conference Championship.

In 1995 again in Canton, Ohio, the Oakland swim team with Murphy as a swimmer finished second in the NCAA Division II Championships with the U.S. Air Force team under Coach Casey Converse winning the championship. In 1996 in North Dakota, Huth's Oakland swim team with Murphy contributing again placed second in the NCAA Division II Championships against the U.S. Air Force team which won the championship. Murphy would later serve as a coach for the U.S. Air Force team beginning in 2012. As an Oakland Senior in February 1997, she swam a 1:01.33 in the 100 backstroke, taking second at the Great Lakes Intercollegiate Athletic Conference Invitational. Murphy graduated Oakland University, cum laude, earning a B.A. in history, and minoring in exercise science. Around 1997–1999, she completed a master's degree in history from the University of Kentucky and later earned a counseling certificate from U. Cal San Diego.

== Coaching ==
In club swimming, from 1997 to 1999, Murphy coached the Wildcat Aquatics team while studying at the University of Kentucky. She has worked at swim camps, including those at the University of Texas, Arizona State, and Penn State.

As swim coach at the University of Iowa from 2001 to 2002, the team set 10 new school records, and as an Assistant Coach, the team qualified for the 2001 NCAA championship, a notable achievement for a young women's coach.

=== Truman State ===
From 2002 to 2005, Murphy was a Head swimming coach from 2003 to 2005 for the strong program at Truman State in Kirksville, Missouri, beginning for a year as an Assistant in 2001-2 under Head Coach Seth Huston. While Murphy was at Truman as Women's Coach, the team won NCAA Division II National titles in three successive years from 2003 to 2005, defeating Missouri's Drury University each year. While coaching Truman, she was honored as an NCAA Division II Coach of the Year on three occasions. Truman's 2001-2 NCAA Championship team, where she served as an Assistant Coach, defeated Drury University and included outstanding performances from Jess Martin with four titles, setting a record in the 1000 freestyle, and a first place by Kelly Dudley in the 100-backstroke with Martin, Sara Hatcher, Katie May, and Bryna Busch winning the 200 freestyle relay. While serving as the head of both the men's and women's teams, she also worked as an exercise instructor. Her men's teams in 2005 earned an NCAA 10th-place finish. With her outstanding record winning championships, Murphy was made a member of the Truman State Hall of Fame in 2011. Sarah Dance, an All American twenty-eight times at Truman State and a top student, was one of her top performer at the NCAA Championships in 2004–5. Murphy left Truman when her husband Joseph Fanthorp took a position as an athletic director at another school. A motivated and resilient team, under Mark Gole, Murphy's replacement as Head Coach, Truman's women's team again won the NCAA Division II national championship in 2006, taking its fifth consecutive championship. Murphy resigned from Truman at the end of 2005.

=== Xavier College Prep ===
As head coach at Xavier College Preparatory in Phoenix, Arizona, from 2007 to 2012, Colleen's swimmers captured the team championship at the 5A Arizona State Championships five consecutive years. In her first year as head coach in October, 2007, having lost 12 starting Senior women swimmers the prior year, Xavier Prep ended their 23-year national record dual meet winning streak of 217 wins, after a loss to Scottsdale's Desert Mountain High School. The Xavier Prep women recovered from the loss to win against Desert Mountain in their following meets that year. They would place first in two of three relay events to win the 2007 Arizona State Title championship on November 5 in Murphy's first year as coach, with rival Desert Mountain High of Scottsdale taking second. Remaining a highly accomplished program before and after Murphy served as Coach, Phoenix's Xavier Prep women's swim team has won the State title 27 times since 1985 and won all but eight years since 1980. The team did not win the state title in '87, '98, 2013–2016, and 2018–19. Murphy's five consecutive State title wins directing the women's team demonstrated her remarkable consistency as a Coach, and it could be noted, Xavier Prep did not win another Arizona state title for four years after her departure. Murphy simultaneously coached the Phoenix Swim Club while at Xavier Prep.

=== Air Force Academy ===
Murphy began coaching at the U.S. Air Force Academy in 2012, serving as an Assistant Coach under Head Coach Casey Converse from 2012 to 2016, and as Head Coach since 2016. Converse had coached the Air Force women's swim team to NCAA Division II Championships in 1995–96 with Murphy competing as a swimmer for Oakland University's women's team which placed second in the championships both years. Since Murphy's first year in 2012, Air Force swim teams have broken every standing school record. In her first year, six Air Force swimmers earned All Mountain West Conference honors. In 2015–16, Murphy was honored as a finalist for the College Swimming Rising Assistant Coach of the Year, and in 2016 received the Judy Sweet Award at the NCAA Women's Coaching Academy. One of her most outstanding swimmers, Genevieve Miller in 2016–17, became Air Force's first four-time All American, and a 2017 Mountain West Conference Swimmer of the Year.

As Head Coach in the 2019–20 season, the team had 13 dual meet wins, and a .722 winning percentage. Winning the Western Athletic Conference in 2019–20, the team went an undefeated 9–0 against Western Conference competition that year. After her move, Murphy's husband Joe would work as a Science teacher in Colorado Springs.

Murphy is married to Joe Fanthorp, and they have two children. The couple met at the University of Kentucky and married around 2000. Fanthorp worked as an Assistant swim coach when wife Colleen was Head swim coach at Truman State University from 2002 to 2005.

=== Honors ===
In 2011, she was inducted into the Truman State Hall of Fame as a Coach. In 2016, she won the Judy Sweet Award at the NCAA Women's Coaching Academy. She was elected as a member of the CSCAA's 100 Greatest Coaches of the Century in 2021, and in January 2024, Murphy became part of Oakland University's Hall of Fame.
