= Andrei Radzionau =

Belarusian swimmer

Personal information
- Nickname: Radz
- Nationality: Belarus
- Born: 16 June 1985 (age 41) Minsk, Belarusian SSR
- Height: 1.92 m (6 ft 3 1/2 in)
- Weight: 85 kg (187 lb)

Sport
- Sport: Swimming
- Strokes: Freestyle
- Club: RTsFVS Minsk (BLR)
- College team: Louisville Cardinals (USA)
- Coach: Arthur Albiero (Louisville)

Andrei Radzionau (Belarusian: Андрэй Радзіонаў; born June 16, 1985) is a former Belarusian competitive swimmer, and 2008 Olympic participant who specialized in sprint freestyle events.

Radzionau swam for RTsFVS Minsk Club in Belarus in his hometown of Minsk.

== University of Louisville ==
Radzionau was a varsity swimmer for the Louisville Cardinals under Coach Arthur Albiero, and graduated with a Bachelor of Arts in environmental analysis from University of Louisville in Louisville, Kentucky.

== 2008 Beijing Olympics ==
Radzionau qualified for the men's 50 m freestyle at the 2008 Summer Olympics in Beijing, by establishing a new Belarusian record and clearing a FINA B-standard entry time of 22.72 from the national championships in his hometown of Minsk. He challenged seven other swimmers on the ninth heat, including three-time Olympian Camilo Becerra of Colombia. Radzionau edged out Filipino-American tanker and Florida-based resident Daniel Coakley to take the fifth spot by four hundredths of a second (0.04), posting his personal best of 22.65. Radzionau placed twenty-sixth out of 97 swimmers in the preliminaries.
