= Ádám Madarassy =

Hungarian swimmer

Personal information
- Full name: Ádám Madarassy
- National team: Hungary
- Born: 14 March 1985 (age 41) Budapest, Hungary
- Height: 1.86 m (6 ft 1 in)
- Weight: 78 kg (172 lb)

Sport
- Sport: Swimming
- Strokes: Butterfly
- Club: Ferencvárosi TC
- College team: University of Louisville (U.S.)
- Coach: Arthur Albiero (U. of Louisville)

Ádám Madarassy (born March 14, 1985, in Budapest) is a Hungarian swimmer who specialized in butterfly events and was a 2008 Olympic participant.

Madarassy swam for the Ferencvárosi TC Club in Ferencvárosi, and was a member of the swimming team for the Louisville Cardinals under Coach Arthur Albiero. Completing his studies, he was a management graduate at the University of Louisville in Louisville, Kentucky.

== 2008 Beijing Olympics ==
Madarassy competed for Hungary in the men's 100 m butterfly at the 2008 Summer Olympics in Beijing. Leading up to the Games, he registered a time of 54.28 to eclipse the FINA B-cut (54.70) by 0.42 of a second at the USA Swimming Grand Prix in Columbus, Ohio. Madarassy threw down his lifetime best of 53.93 to hit the wall with a fourth-place finish in heat three, trailing winner Rimvydas Šalčius of Lithuania by just more than a second. Madarassy failed to advance into the semifinals, as he placed fiftieth out of 66 swimmers in the prelims.
