= Tracy Huth =

American swimming coach and administrator

Biographical details
- Education: Oakland University; B.A. Secondary Education

Playing career
- 1980-1984: Oakland University; Coach Pete Hovland
- Position: Medley swimming

Coaching career (HC unless noted)
- 1987-1997: Oakland University; Women's Swimming Coach
- 1997-2007: Oakland University; Assistant, Associate Director of Athletics
- 2007-2014: Oakland University; Director of Athletics
- 2014-2018: University California, Los Angeles; Asst to Athletic Director
- 2018-: University of Northern Colorado; Ath. Director Revenue Dev.

Accomplishments and honors

Championships
- 5 x NCAA Div. II Championships 1990-94 (Oakland Women)

Awards
- Oakland University Hall of Fame; ASCA Greatest 100 Coaches

Tracy Huth was a swimming competitor for Michigan's Oakland University in the early 1980's, and later their Women's swimming coach from 1987-1997, where he led the team to 5 consecutive NCAA Division II Championships from 1990-94. While working as an Athletic Administrator and then Athletic Director at Oakland through 2014, he helped transition Oakland to a National Collegiate Athletic Association Division I team, and oversaw the swim program win 14 consecutive Summit League Conference championships between 2000-2014. He later worked in Athletic administration for the University of California Los Angeles from 2014-2018 and after 2018 for the University of Northern Colorado.

Huth grew up in Yakima, Washington, where he was a High School All American swimmer and represented the Yakima YMCA.

On June 29, 2974, Huth competed in a regional Junior Olympic meet representing Yakima in the 11-12 age groups and placed second in the 100-meter fly. In July 1977, at the finals of the Spokane AAU Holiday Invitational Swim meet, he swam a 2:26.22 in the 200 individual medley leading his Yakima YMCA team to place third in the meet. As a young competitor again at the Spokane Holiday Invitational Swimming Meet in July 1978, he swam for the Yakima YMCA, recording a time of 17:42.74 for 1500 meters, qualifying for that year's Junior Olympics.

== Oakland University swimmer ==
Huth was recruited as a swimmer for Oakland in 1979, the same year Pete Hovland started as Coach. Hovland served as a coach at Oakland from 1979-2023, where he led the men's team to four NCAA Division II team national championships from 1994-1997 and 44 conference titles.

Huth earned a total of 24 All-American honors and 13 individual national championships during his swimming career with Oakland. He was a four-time national champion in the 200- and 400-yard individual medley events and earned NCAA Division II Swimmer of the Year three times. Swimming for Oakland in March, 1981, he set an NCAA record at the NCAA National Championships in Youngstown, Ohio, in the 400-meter Individual Medley of 4:03.03. He served as team Captain in 1983. In 1983 as an Oakland swim team competitor, he set a record for the 1650-meter freestyle of 15:53.44. While swimming for Oakland, he won both the 200 and 400 IM NCAA Championships all four years of his collegiate swimming career, and served as team Captain in his Senior year. Huth subsequently merited induction into Oakland’s Athletic Hall of Honor as a champion swimmer.

Huth completed a master’s degree in sports administration from Wayne State University and a bachelor’s degree in secondary education, from Oakland University, in 1985.

== Oakland University women's coach ==
Huth coached Women's swimming at Oakland from 1987-1997. During his accomplished tenure, his teams finished in the top three nationally in nine consecutive seasons, winning five consecutive national championships and three straight runner-up finishes from 1990-97. In one of his best coaching years, the 1994 Women's Swim and Dive Team was inducted into Oakland's Hollie Lepley Hall of Honor in 2024. Hollie Lepley was a former Director of Athletics at Oakland. The 1994 team was part of a sequential championship run for the Oakland program. Under Coach Huth, Oakland's women swimmers finished the 1993-94 season with an 8-2 record, and captured a Great Lake's Intercollegiate Athletic Conference (GLIAC) Championship and Oakland's fifth straight NCAA Division II Championship, which they won consecutively from 1990 through 1994.

== Oakland athletic administrator ==
From 1997-2007, Huth served as Associate Athletic Director and then Assistant Athletic Director from 1998-2007 before being appointed as Director of Athletics in 2007, where he served through January 2014. While serving as an administrator in the late 1990's he saw Oakland transition from a Division I to a Division II NCAA team. The Oakland swim program won 14 Summit Conference championships between 2000-2014. Under Huth's tenure as Athletic Director, Oakland acquired over $10 million in new facilities and improvements, and brought the NCAA tournament to The Palace of Auburn Hills, as Oakland served as host to the tournament’s second and third rounds in March 2021. Huth had formerly served as tournament manager when Oakland welcomed the 2006 tournament. In January 2014, the year Huth retired as athletic administrator, Oakland's Men's and Women's Swimming and Diving captured Oakland's first Horizon League titles and their 15th consecutive conference championship.

=== Outstanding swimmers ===
Nancy Schermer, an Oakland Senior in 1988, was a top swimmer for Huth while he was women's coach. Huth's outstanding 1994 team featured freestyle sprinter Ellen Lessig, backstroker Amy Comerford, middle and long distance freestyler Kristen Barwell and distance freestyler Debby Nichols. Colleen Murphy, an Oakland All American, and another one of Huth's outstanding swimmers on the women's 1994 Division II NCAA Championship team, became a career coach who would lead the swimming team at Truman State University to three successive NCAA championships between 2002-2005, and later coach swimming at the U.S. Air Force Academy beginning in 2012.

Several athletes at Oakland during Huth's time at the University participated in the Olympics. Haitham Hazem, who swam for Oakland while Huth was an Oakland Athletic administrator, participated in the 2000 Olympics for the Egyptian Olympic team in the butterfly, IM and backstroke. Cheryl Angelelli who graduated Oakland University in 1993, was a paralympic swimmer and medalist in the 2004 and 2008 Olympics. There were no known Olympic participants in swimming who swam with Huth during his time as women's swim coach, but several male Olympic participants who swam for Oakland while Huth worked as a coach or administrator. Eric McIlquham, a 1992 graduate of Oakland, and a swimmer for the men's team, coached the Egyptian Olympic team in 1996 and 2000, and coached for the University of West Virginia. 1992 Oakland graduate Hilton Woods who swam for Coach Pete Hovland, represented the Netherlands Antilles in the 1988 Olympic Games and also participated in the 1984 Olympics.

== UCLA, University Northern Colorado administrator ==
Huth worked for several years from around 2014-2018 as a Special Assistant to the Athletic Director at UCLA. In June, 2018, he accepted a position as Athletic Director of Revenue Development at the University of Northern Colorado where he joined his wife Jenny who took over as a University of Colorado women's basketball coach.

He married the former Jenny Roulier in 2007. Jenny was an Assistant Women's Basketball Coach at UCLA, and had served as an Assistant Coach at Oakland from 1987-1989, when the couple likely met.

Active in swimming community administration, Huth served as an NCAA Swimming and Diving Committee Chair beginning in 2006, where he worked largely with the rules committee and reviewing entries for national championship meets. He served a four year term at least through 2010, though likely longer.

== Honors ==
Huth was elected to the Oakland University Hall of Fame twice, once as a swimming competitor and once as a coach. He was elected to the College Swimming & Diving Coaches Association of America's (CSCAA), Greatest 100 Coaches of the Century in 2021, along with Oakland Men's Coach Pete Hovland.
