= Andrea Kneppers =

Dutch swimmer (born 1993)

Personal information
- National team: Netherlands
- Born: 24 February 1993 (age 33) Hartford, Connecticut, U.S.

Sport
- Sport: Swimming
- Strokes: Freestyle
- College team: University of Louisville
- Coach: Arthur Albiero (Louisville)
Medal record
Women's swimming
Representing the Netherlands
European Championships (LC)
Bronze medal – third place	2016 London	4 × 200 m freestyle

Andrea Kneppers (born 24 February 1993) is a Dutch competitive swimmer who specialises in freestyle.

At the 2016 European Aquatics Championships in London, Kneppers won a bronze medal in the 4 × 200 m freestyle relay, together with her teammates Esmee Vermeulen, Robin Neumann, and Femke Heemskerk.

Kneppers attended and swam for the University of Louisville under Head Coach Arthur Albiero.

She qualified for the 2016 Summer Olympics in Rio de Janeiro. In the 4 × 200 metre freestyle relay, her team finished 14th in the heats.
