= Ernest W. Maglischo =

American physiological researcher and swimming coach

Biographical details
- Born: April 5, 1938 (age 88); Ohio
- Education: Ohio University 1960

Playing career
- 1957–1960: Ohio State University; Mike Peppe, Coach
- Positions: Medley, Freestyle

Coaching career (HC unless noted)
- 1966–1976: Chico State
- 1979–1981: Oakland University; Head coach
- 1981–1983: Chico State
- 1983–1993: Cal State Bakersfield
- 1993–1998: Arizona State
- 2002–2003: Oakland University

Head coaching record
- Overall: 173-61, 73.9 Winning %

Accomplishments and honors

Championships
- 13 x NCAA Div. II, III National Champions; 19 x Conference Championships (Chico St., Oakland, Cal St. Bakers.)

Awards
- 16 x Conference Coach of the Year 67–72; 5xNorth. Cal. College Coach of the Year 70–76; Master Coach (ASCAA) 78; 7 X NCAA Div. II Swim Coach of Year 80–93; National Colleg. and Schol. Swim Trophy 91

Ernest W. Maglischo is an American former competitive swimmer for Ohio State University who taught, performed physiological research, authored books and articles, and served as a Hall of Fame collegiate swimming coach for 38 years. From 1966–1993, he won 13 NCAA national championships at the Division II or III level and 19 conference championships during his most successful coaching years at Chico State, Oakland University, and Cal State Bakersfield.

== Early life and swimming ==
Maglischo was born on April 5, 1938 and was a native of Massillon, Ohio. He graduated Massillon Washington High School in 1956, where he was recognized as a Distinguished Alumni in 2007. While at Washington High in the mid-50's, he was a swim star for local YMCA teams. Excelling in freestyle at 16 while representing the High School Division of the Massillon YMCA, Maglischo took first in both the 40 and 100-yard freestyle competition in November, 1954 leading the Massillon Y to win the season opening meet. On March 19, 1955, Maglischo swam on a winning 4x50-yard freestyle relay team for the Massillon Y that won their event and the High School Division in 1:55.3 at the Northeastern Ohio Championships in Akron, Ohio.

Again representing the Massillon YMCA at Youngstown's Northeast Ohio District Championship, a region-wide meet, on March 10, 1956, he swam with a 200-yard medley relay team that broke a pool record with a time of 2:04, leading the team to win the District Championship. In the Spring of his Senior year, on April 16, 1956, Maglischo was awarded a trophy for the Outstanding High School Swimmer at the YMCA's All Sports Banquet.

== Ohio State swimmer ==
Attending Ohio State from 1956 to 1960, Maglischo served as a team Co-captain for their outstanding swim program in his Senior Year. While competing for the University, Maglischo held first places in the 50-yard freestyle, and the 200-yard Individual Medley, and led the team to a 5–1 season in 1960. He earned two letters in swimming, and was trained and managed by Hall of Fame Coach Mike Peppe. In the early 1940s, James "Doc" Councilman had also swum for Peppe at Ohio State. Maglischo would later study and admire the work of Counsilman, who held a PHd from the University of Iowa, and like Maglischo, researched the biomechanics of swimming.

== Education and memberships ==
Maglischo earned a PhD in exercise physiology from the Ohio State University and previously earned a Masters in Physical Education in 1961 from Bowling Green. He received his BA from Ohio University in 1960 in Physical Education. He is a member of the College Swimming Coaches Association, the American Swimming Coaches Association, and U.S.A. Swimming, where he has served on the Sports Medicine Committee.

== Marriage ==
Maglischo married Cheryl Worden Maglischo in 1968. Worden was a college instructor who was a graduate of USC. Much of her research dealt with swimming physiology and complimented her husband's research. She worked on a biomechanical analysis of freestylers who swam distance for the 1984 U.S. Olympic team. She died in September, 2002. The couple met while Ernest was coaching at California State Chico.

== Coaching ==
Though several were brief and performed while he was completing his education, Maglischo's earliest coaching assignments were at Ohio's Bowling Green, where he completed his Masters in 1961, Ohio Wesleyan, Michigan's Alpena High School, State University of New York at New Paltz, and Ohio State, where he was a Doctoral student in the early 1970s.

He coached the Chico Aquajets, a youth team, from 1967 to 1974 while working as Chico State head coach. He coached at Chico State from 1966 to 76, where he led the team to qualify and attend four NCAA National Championships. At Chico State, his teams won seven Far Western Conference Titles. One of his outstanding swimmers was a future Hall of Fame Coach at Oakland State, Pete Hovland. During his tenure, he coached 19 NCAA individual titlists, and eighty All American swimmers.

After leaving Chico State, Maglisco coached Rochester, Michigan's Oakland University Golden Grizzlies initially for two years, from 1979 to 81, where he led the team to its first national championship and set the basis for the University's future successes. After leaving Oakland, he returned to coach California State at Chico from 1981 to 1983.

Maglischo then served as a coach at Cal State Bakersfield from 1983 to 93 where during one of his longer coaching tenures, he led the Roadrunner's swimming team to eight NCAA Division II national titles. During his tenure, he coached Arthur Albiero, who would swim as an All American medley swimmer for Oakland University from 1993–1996 and later coach at the University of Louisville for over 20 years.

He more recently coached at Arizona State University (ASU) from 1993 to 98 where he led the Sun Devils to an eleventh place NCAA finish in both the 1997 and 1998 seasons. His 1997 ASU swim team had four swimmers achieve all-America honors. Maglischo helped lead the 1996 Arizona swim squad to a ninth-place NCAA finish. In 1995, ASU finished second in the PAC-10 Championships, and had its first individual NCAA Champion in 13 years with Francisco Sanchez's victory in the 50-yard freestyle.

In international coaching, Maglisco was a consultant for the 1984, 1988 and 1992 US Olympic Swim Team. In 1996, he was a coach for the Ecuador Olympic Swim Team.

== Coaching record ==
As of 2002, Maglischo's earned a career coaching record of 173–61 and his teams captured 13 NCAA Division II or Division III National Championships. He is the only coach to win NCAA championships at three separate universities, likely consisting of Chico State, Oakland University and Cal State Bakersfield. His teams have won 19 conference championships at three different universities.

In 1995, Maglischo served as a Director of Research at the University of Arizona School of Health Sciences. He was joined at the School of Health Sciences by his wife Cherylee who also served as a Director. Cherlyee moved from California where she had been teaching at Chico State University. Retiring from coaching initially in 1998 when he left Arizona State, Maglischo continued to live in Phoenix, Arizona.

In 2002, he returned to coaching at Oakland University after a five-year hiatus from the profession but only served about a year. He was appointed by serving Athletic Director Tracy Huth, one of his former swimmers at Oakland University.

== Author and researcher ==
Maglischo co-authored or authored six books used as texts, consisting of three booklets on swimming and two textbooks on nutrition for athletes. He was the author of computer programs on various aspects of competitive swimming, and produced fifty-four publications for periodicals which detailed his biomechanical and physiological research. He produced technical articles focusing on swim training and stroke mechanics and participated in government research projects.

== Coaching focus ==
Maglischo contributed to the science of swimming through his research. His coaching philosophy, as described in his book Swimming Fastest is based on scientific principles and a deep understanding of the mechanics of swimming. Critical aspects include:

- Applying scientific research to training that uses biomechanics, physiology, and psychology.
- Paying careful attention to technique to improve performance and reduce injury
- Focusing training on the needs of individual swimmers, addressing their unique strengths and weaknesses.
- Structuring training into separate phases to time peak performances for major competitions
- Using mental preparation that increases psychological resilience to achieve increasing success

Maglischo's book "Swimming Even Faster" was released in 1993. A more comprehensive volume, "Swimming Fastest" was released in 2003.

== Selected booklist ==
- Swimming Fastest, Maglischo, Ernest W.
- Swimming Even Faster, Maglischo, Ernest W.
- Swimming Faster, Maglischo, Ernest W.
- Swimming, Costill, David L., Maglischo, Ernest W., Richardson, A.B.
- A Primer for Swimming Coaches: Physiological Foundations, Maglischo, Ernest W.
- Handbook of Sports Medicine and Science, Swimming (Olympic Handbook of Sports Medicine), Costill, David L. (editor), Maglischo, Ernest W.
- A Primer for Swimming Coaches: Biomedical Foundations, Maglischo, Ernest W.

== Honors ==
For his accomplishments as a coach, he was admitted to the Oakland University Hall of Honor in 1995. Prior to that honor, he was admitted to the California-Chico Hall of Fame, the city of Chico Hall of Fame, the Massillon Washington High School Alumni Hall of Fame, the State University of New York at New Paltz Hall of Fame and the Canton Ohio Swimming Hall of Fame.

He received one of the more exclusive coaching awards, the National Collegiate and Scholastic Swimming Trophy in 1991.

In 1978, he was awarded the title of Master Coach by the College Swimming Coaches Association of America (ASCAA), and was presented with the Honor Award for outstanding contributions to aquatics by the American Alliance for Health, Physical Education Recreation and Dance (AAHPERD) in 1987. Between 1980 and 1993, he was the NCAA Division II Swimming Coach of the Year seven times. Between 1967 and 1992, he was recognized as a Conference Coach of the Year sixteen times, and was a five-time Northern California College Swimming Coach of the Year between from 1970 to 76.
