= Jim Steen =

Biographical details
- Born: c. 1948
- Education: Kent State University; University of Miami; M.A. Education

Playing career
- 1967–1971: Kent State University
- Positions: Sprint, Back Stroke

Coaching career (HC unless noted)
- 1974–1975: Miami University; Oxford, Ohio; Graduate Student; Assistant Coach
- 1976–2012: Kenyon College Men
- 1976–2010: Kenyon College Women

Accomplishments and honors

Championships
- 29 NCAA Men's Championships; Credited As Head Coach (1980–2011), Div. III (Steen on sabbatical 2 years); 21 NCAA Women's Championships; Credited as Head Coach (17 Consec. 1984–2001); 23 combined NCAC Conference Championships since '83 (Men and Women)

Awards
- 14 x CSCAA Coach of the Year '12 CSCAA’s Lifetime Achievement Award; 26 x ASCAA Certificate of Excellence '94 Nat. Colleg. & Schol. Swim. Trophy

James Steen served as a swim coach at Kenyon College from 1976 to 2012, where he became the first coach in NCAA collegiate history to have his men's and women's teams win a combined 50 Division III NCAA championships.

== Education, early swimming ==
=== Malabar High School ===
In 1966, as captain of the Malabar High School Swim Team in Mansfield, Ohio, he set records in the 50 and 100-yard freestyle of 23.4 and 1:01.7. Swimming for Malabar in the same year, he also set the Cardinal Conference swimming record of 2:17.2 in the 200-yard individual medley. In 1965–66, showing stroke diversity, he held records in the 100 free, 100 back and 100 fly in the Greater Mansfield Aquatic Conference. While at Malabar, Steen swam for Coach Frank Bartholow.

=== Kent State University ===
Steen was a graduate of Kent State University, where he received All Mid-American Honors for three successive years, primarily in his conference swimming sprint events and back stroke. Kent State, in Kent, Ohio, was seventy-five miles northeast of Mansfield, where Steen went to high school.

In the Mid-American Conference Championships in December 1968, he swam on a 400-yard medley relay team that set a conference record, as well as on a winning 4-member conference record-setting back stroke team that swam a 1:43.7. In the Mid-American Conference Relay Championships in Oxford in December, 1969, he swam in a 200-yard backstroke relay that won first place, and set a new conference record time of 1:41.4, beating his prior record.

Majoring in political science, he made dean's list at Kent State in the fall of 1969. After graduating in 1971, he received a master's in education from Miami of Ohio University.

== Coaching swimming at Kenyon ==
Around 1975, while working as an assistant coach as a graduate student at Miami University, Steen applied for a Kenyon position as student housing director. When he learned that Kenyon's head swimming coach Dick Sloan had left to work for Ohio State, he withdrew his application to be housing director, and applied as the new swimming coach.

=== NCAA championships, All-Americans ===
Steen's teams have won more NCAA championships than any other team in any division or any sport. Under his tenure, the Kenyon Lords Men's Swimming Team won 31 consecutive NCAA Division III championships, the first having been in 1980. Twenty-nine (29) NCAA Men's Championships are officially credited to Steen as head coach, as he was not credited in two years when he was taking sabbaticals from Kenyon, including 1968. Kenyon's women's swim team have won 17 consecutive (23 nonconsecutive) titles beginning 1984, of which 21 are officially credited to Steen. In over 30 years at Kenyon, Steen has developed over 150 NCAA champions and over 300 All-Americans.

=== NCAC Conference performance ===
Steen's championship seasons have been just as consistent on the conference level. Since the 1984–85 season, when Kenyon joined the North Coast Athletic Conference (NCAC), the Kenyon's men's and women's swimming and diving teams have taken 23 conference NCAC championships.

=== Honors ===
Steen's honors in the swimming community are extensive, and have repeated in many consecutive years, as have his NCAA championship seasons. He has been voted College Swimming Coaches Association of America (CSCAA) Division III Coach-of-the-year twelve times. He is a 26-time winner of the American Swimming Coaches Association (ASCA) Certificate of Excellence. He received the National Collegiate and Scholastic Swimming Trophy in 1994. He has also received the ASCA Gold Award of Excellence in 1996 and shortly after his retirement received CSCAA’s Lifetime Achievement Award in 2012.

For his work with the Kenyon Men, Steen was made a five-time NCAC Coach of the Year and he received the same award eight times for the Kenyon women's team.

Academically he has produced more postgraduate scholars than any other coach in any division, and places high importance on students' academic performance as well as athletic success.

== Work outside coaching ==
In 1996 Coach Steen took a one-year sabbatical from Kenyon College to consult with many of America's top coaches prior to the Atlanta Olympic Games. Like a number of long-serving college swim coaches, he was consulted during the designing and building of the swimming facilities for the Kenyon Athletic Center in 2002. In August 2008, he was invited to give an informational "pep talk" to the Ohio State Buckeyes football team.

Steen was an early adopter of sports psychology and used visualization and cross training practices long before other programs.

Steen has served on both the CSCAA Executive and NCAA Rules Committee. During his career, he has traveled throughout the U.S. conducting a number of swim clinics. He has achieved recognition in both America and internationally through his training methods, scholarly articles, vigorous presentation skills, and Kenyon's unprecedented success as champions.

=== Retirement ===
Steen retired from coaching in 2012 after 36 years. He was replaced by former Kenyon swimmer Jess Book, who has won three consecutive NCAA Division III titles.

=== Legacy ===
Former Kenyon swimmers who coached at the college level include former NCAA Champions Kami Gardner (Washington & Lee), Tracy Menzel (DePauw), Dani Korman (Kenyon), Gregg Parini (Denison) a three-time NCAA national champion, and Jon Howell (Emory); as noted, the latter two have gone on to coach their teams to an NCAA Championship.

At the 2012 NCAA's, Steen's last championship as Coach, Steen's coaching successor Jess Book estimated there were 24 former Kenyon swimming or coaching alumni at the meet working as Head or Assistant coaches.
