= List of American Conference champions =

The American Conference (formerly the American Athletic Conference) is an NCAA Division I conference that sponsors championships in 22 sports (10 men's and 12 women's). For every sport except football, the champion is determined using a postseason tournament or meet.

== Members ==
– All-sports member
– Full, non-football member
– Affiliate member (football)
– Affiliate member (other)

The American has 13 full member institutions:

- Charlotte
- East Carolina
- Florida Atlantic
- Memphis
- North Texas
- Rice
- South Florida
- Temple
- Tulane
- Tulsa
- UAB
- UTSA
- Wichita State (non-football member)

In addition, the conference has nine current affiliate members:

- Army (football)
- FIU (men's soccer and women's swimming and diving)
- James Madison (women's lacrosse and women's swimming and diving)
- Liberty (women's swimming & diving)
- Marshall (women's swimming & diving)
- Missouri State (men's soccer)
- Navy (football)
- Old Dominion (women's lacrosse)
- Vanderbilt (women's lacrosse)

=== Former members ===
Seven schools were formerly full members of The American:

- Cincinnati (2013–23)
- Houston (2013–23)
- Louisville (2013–14)
- Rutgers (2013–14)
- SMU (2013–24)
- UCF (2013–23)
- UConn (2013–20)

Several other schools have been affiliate members in the past. Five have completely left the American. One current affiliate member had previously been an affiliate in a second sport. Five others, indicated in italics, were affiliate members for one season before becoming full conference members.

- Charlotte (men's soccer, 2022–23)
- Cincinnati (women's lacrosse, 2023–24)
- Florida (women's lacrosse, 2018–24)
- Florida Atlantic (men's soccer, women's swimming & diving; 2022–23)
- North Texas (women's swimming & diving, 2022–23)
- Old Dominion (women's rowing, 2020–24) — still a women's lacrosse affiliate
- Rice (women's swimming, 2022–23) – Rice dropped diving from its women's aquatics program in 1991 and did not reinstate the discipline until 2024, after it had become a full conference member.
- Sacramento State (women's rowing, 2015–24)
- San Diego State (women's rowing, 2015–21)
- UAB (men's soccer, 2022–23)
- Villanova (women's rowing, 2013–15)

=== Membership timeline ===
Full members Full members (non-football) Affiliate members (football only) Affiliate members (one sport, non-football) Affiliate members (multiple sports)

Key: MS – Men's Soccer; WSD – Women's Swimming and Diving; WR – Women's rowing; WL – Women's lacrosse

== Most recent champions ==
=== 2025–26 ===
| Sport | Champion |
|---|---|
| Baseball | UTSA (regular season, shared) |
| Baseball | East Carolina (regular season, shared) |
| Baseball | East Carolina (tournament) |
| Men's basketball | South Florida (regular season & tournament) |
| Women's basketball | Rice (regular season) |
| Women's basketball | UTSA (tournament) |
| Men's cross country | Tulsa |
| Women's cross country | Tulane |
| Football | Tulane |
| Men's golf | Charlotte |
| Women's golf | Tulsa |
| Women's lacrosse | South Florida (regular season) |
| Women's lacrosse | James Madison (tournament) |
| Men's soccer | Charlotte (regular season) |
| Men's soccer | Florida Atlantic (tournament) |
| Women's soccer | Memphis (regular season) |
| Women's soccer | UTSA (tournament) |
| Softball | South Florida (regular season, shared) |
| Softball | Wichita State (regular season, shared) |
| Softball | South Florida (tournament) |
| Women's swimming & diving | Rice |
| Men's tennis | Tulsa |
| Women's tennis | Rice |
| Men's indoor track & field | North Texas |
| Women's indoor track & field | South Florida |
| Men's outdoor track & field | Wichita State |
| Women's outdoor track & field | Rice |
| Women's volleyball | Rice (regular season) |
| Women's volleyball | Tulsa (tournament) |

=== 2024–25 ===
| Sport | Champion |
|---|---|
| Baseball | UTSA (regular season) |
| Baseball | East Carolina (tournament) |
| Men's basketball | Memphis (regular season & tournament) |
| Women's basketball | UTSA (regular season) |
| Women's basketball | South Florida (tournament) |
| Men's cross country | Tulane |
| Women's cross country | Tulsa |
| Football | Army |
| Men's golf | Charlotte |
| Women's golf | Tulsa |
| Women's lacrosse | James Madison (regular season & tournament) |
| Men's soccer | Memphis (regular season) |
| Men's soccer | Charlotte (tournament) |
| Women's soccer | Memphis (regular season) |
| Women's soccer | East Carolina (tournament) |
| Softball | Florida Atlantic (regular season) |
| Softball | South Florida (tournament) |
| Women's swimming & diving | Rice |
| Men's tennis | Rice |
| Women's tennis | Memphis |
| Men's indoor track & field | South Florida |
| Women's indoor track & field | Tulane |
| Men's outdoor track & field | South Florida |
| Women's outdoor track & field | Charlotte |
| Volleyball | South Florida (regular season) |
| Volleyball | Wichita State (tournament) |

=== 2023–24 ===
| Sport | Champion |
|---|---|
| Baseball | East Carolina (regular season) |
| Baseball | Tulane (tournament) |
| Men's basketball | South Florida (regular season) |
| Men's basketball | UAB (tournament) |
| Women's basketball | North Texas (regular season, shared) |
| Women's basketball | Temple (regular season, shared) |
| Women's basketball | Tulsa (regular season, shared) |
| Women's basketball | Rice (tournament) |
| Men's cross country | Tulsa |
| Women's cross country | Tulane |
| Football | SMU |
| Men's golf | South Florida |
| Women's golf | SMU |
| Women's lacrosse | Florida (regular season and tournament) |
| Women's rowing | SMU |
| Men's soccer | SMU (regular season) |
| Men's soccer | Charlotte (tournament) |
| Women's soccer | Memphis (regular season and tournament) |
| Softball | Charlotte (regular season, shared) |
| Softball | Florida Atlantic (regular season, shared) |
| Softball | Charlotte (tournament) |
| Women's swimming & diving | FIU |
| Men's tennis | Charlotte |
| Women's tennis | SMU |
| Men's indoor track & field | South Florida |
| Women's indoor track & field | Charlotte |
| Men's outdoor track & field | South Florida |
| Women's outdoor track & field | Charlotte |
| Volleyball | SMU |

=== 2022–23 ===
| Sport | Champion |
|---|---|
| Baseball | East Carolina (regular season) |
| Baseball | Tulane (tournament) |
| Men's basketball | Houston (regular season) |
| Men's basketball | Memphis (tournament) |
| Women's basketball | South Florida (regular season) |
| Women's basketball | East Carolina (tournament) |
| Men's cross country | Tulsa |
| Women's cross country | Tulsa |
| Football | Tulane |
| Men's golf | Houston |
| Women's golf | SMU |
| Women's lacrosse | James Madison (regular season) |
| Women's lacrosse | Florida (tournament) |
| Women's rowing | SMU |
| Men's soccer | FIU (regular season and tournament) |
| Women's soccer | UCF (regular season) |
| Women's soccer | Memphis (tournament) |
| Softball | Wichita State (regular season) |
| Softball | UCF (tournament) |
| Men's swimming & diving | SMU |
| Women's swimming & diving | Houston |
| Men's tennis | SMU |
| Women's tennis | SMU |
| Men's indoor track & field | Cincinnati |
| Women's indoor track & field | UCF |
| Men's outdoor track & field | Wichita State |
| Women's outdoor track & field | UCF |
| Volleyball | Houston |
| Volleyball | UCF |
| Volleyball | (tied) |

=== 2021–22 ===
| Sport | Champion |
|---|---|
| Baseball | East Carolina (Regular season and tournament) |
| Men's basketball | Houston (Regular season and tournament) |
| Women's basketball | UCF (Regular season and tournament) |
| Men's cross country | Tulsa |
| Women's cross country | Tulsa |
| Football | Cincinnati |
| Men's golf | SMU |
| Women's golf | Tulane |
| Women's lacrosse | Florida (Regular season and tournament) |
| Women's rowing | SMU |
| Men's soccer | Tulsa (Regular season and tournament) |
| Women's soccer | South Florida (Regular season) |
| Women's soccer | Memphis (Tournament) |
| Softball | UCF (Regular season and tournament) |
| Men's swimming & diving | SMU |
| Women's swimming & diving | Houston |
| Men's tennis | SMU |
| Women's tennis | Memphis |
| Men's indoor track & field | Houston |
| Men's outdoor track & field | Wichita State |
| Women's indoor track & field | UCF |
| Women's outdoor track & field | UCF |
| Volleyball | UCF |

== Baseball ==
Baseball is sponsored by 10 of the 13 full American Conference members. The only schools which do not sponsor baseball are North Texas, Temple, and Tulsa (though Temple had a team in the 2014 season, which was dropped after that season).

| Year | Regular Season champion | Tournament champion |
|---|---|---|
| 2014 | Louisville^{†} | Houston^{†} |
| 2015 | Houston^{†} | East Carolina |
| 2016 | Tulane | UConn^{†} |
| 2017 | UCF^{†} | Houston^{†} |
| 2017 | Houston^{†} | Houston^{†} |
| 2017 | (tied) (Note: UCF is listed first because they were named the 1 seed for the 2017 conference tournament) | Houston^{†} |
| 2018 | Houston^{†} | East Carolina |
| 2019 | East Carolina | Cincinnati^{†} |
| 2020 | No games played due to COVID-19 | |
| 2021 | East Carolina | South Florida |
| 2022 | East Carolina | |
| 2023 | East Carolina | Tulane |
| 2024 | East Carolina | Tulane |
| 2025 | UTSA | East Carolina |
| 2026 | East Carolina | East Carolina |
| 2026 | UTSA | East Carolina |

†: No longer members of the conference

== Men's basketball ==
All 13 full members of the American support men's basketball, making it the only men's sport sponsored by every team in the conference.

| Year | Regular Season champion | Tournament champion |
|---|---|---|
| 2013–14 | Cincinnati^{†} | Louisville^{†} (vacated) |
| 2013–14 | Louisville^{†} (vacated) | Louisville^{†} (vacated) |
| 2013–14 | (tied) (Note: Cincinnati is listed first because they were named the 1 seed for the 2014 conference tournament) | Louisville^{†} (vacated) |
| 2014–15 | SMU^{†} | |
| 2015–16 | Temple | UConn^{†} |
| 2016–17 | SMU^{†} | |
| 2017–18 | Cincinnati^{†} | |
| 2018–19 | Houston^{†} | Cincinnati^{†} |
| 2019–20 | Cincinnati^{†} | Not played due to COVID-19 |
| 2019–20 | Houston^{†} | Not played due to COVID-19 |
| 2019–20 | Tulsa | Not played due to COVID-19 |
| 2019–20 | (all tied) (Note: Cincinnati is listed first because they were named the 1 seed for the 2020 conference tournament, which was later canceled due to COVID-19) | Not played due to COVID-19 |
| 2020–21 | Wichita State | Houston^{†} |
| 2021–22 | Houston^{†} | |
| 2022–23 | Houston^{†} | Memphis |
| 2023–24 | South Florida | UAB |
| 2024–25 | Memphis | Memphis |
| 2025–26 | South Florida | |

†: No longer members of the conference

== Women's basketball ==
Like men's basketball, women's basketball is also sponsored by all 13 full members of the conference.

| Year | Regular Season champion | Tournament champion |
|---|---|---|
| 2013–14 | UConn^{†} | |
| 2014–15 | UConn^{†} | |
| 2015–16 | UConn^{†} | |
| 2016–17 | UConn^{†} | |
| 2017–18 | UConn^{†} | |
| 2018–19 | UConn^{†} | |
| 2019–20 | UConn^{†} | |
| 2020–21 | South Florida | |
| 2021–22 | UCF^{†} | |
| 2022–23 | South Florida | East Carolina |
| 2023–24 | Tulsa | Rice |
| 2023–24 | North Texas | Rice |
| 2023–24 | Temple | Rice |
| 2024–25 | UTSA | South Florida |
| 2025–26 | Rice | UTSA |

†: No longer members of the conference

== Men's cross country ==
Men's cross country is supported by 12 of the 13 American Conference teams, with the only exception being UAB.

| Year | Champion |
|---|---|
| 2013 | Louisville^{†} |
| 2014 | Tulsa |
| 2015 | Tulsa |
| 2016 | Tulsa |
| 2017 | Tulsa |
| 2018 | Tulsa |
| 2019 | Tulsa |
| 2020 | Tulsa |
| 2021 | Tulsa |
| 2022 | Tulsa |
| 2023 | Tulsa |
| 2024 | Tulane |
| 2025 | Tulsa |

†: No longer members of the conference

== Women's cross country ==
Unlike men's cross country, women's cross country is sponsored by every full member of the conference.

| Year | Champion |
|---|---|
| 2013 | SMU |
| 2014 | Tulsa |
| 2015 | Tulsa |
| 2016 | SMU |
| 2017 | UConn^{†} |
| 2018 | Wichita State |
| 2019 | Tulsa |
| 2020 | Tulsa |
| 2021 | Tulsa |
| 2022 | Tulsa |
| 2023 | Tulane |
| 2024 | Tulsa |
| 2025 | Tulane |

†: No longer members of the conference

== Football ==
Football is sponsored by every full American Conference member except Wichita State. Affiliate members Army and Navy also play football in the conference.

| Year | Champion |
|---|---|
| 2013 | UCF^{†} |
| 2014 | Memphis |
| 2014 | Cincinnati^{†} |
| 2014 | UCF^{†} |
| 2014 | (all tied) (Note: Prior to 2015 the conference champion was determined by regular season conference record, which allowed for ties in the standings. Memphis, Cincinnati, and UCF each went 7–1 in conference games with Memphis beating Cincinnati, Cincinnati beating UCF, and UCF beating Memphis. Memphis is listed first because they had a better overall record than Cincinnati and UCF.) |
| 2015 | Houston^{†} |
| 2016 | Temple |
| 2017 | UCF^{†} |
| 2018 | UCF^{†} |
| 2019 | Memphis |
| 2020 | Cincinnati^{†} |
| 2021 | Cincinnati |
| 2022 | Tulane |
| 2023 | SMU^{†} |
| 2024 | Army |
| 2025 | Tulane |

†: No longer members of the conference

== Men's golf ==
As of the upcoming 2026–27 NCAA men's golf season, two conference members do not sponsor men's golf: Tulane and Wichita State, the latter of which dropped men's and women's golf after the 2025–26 season. Tulsa dropped men's golf after the 2015–16 season, but reinstated the sport in 2026–27.

| Year | Champion |
|---|---|
| 2014 | SMU^{†} |
| 2015 | South Florida |
| 2016 | South Florida |
| 2017 | South Florida |
| 2018 | South Florida |
| 2019 | Memphis |
| 2020 | Not played due to COVID-19 |
| 2021 | South Florida |
| 2022 | SMU^{†} |
| 2023 | Houston^{†} |
| 2024 | South Florida |
| 2025 | Charlotte |
| 2026 | Charlotte |

†: No longer members of the conference

== Women's golf ==
In 2026–27, Temple and Wichita State are the only full conference members that do not sponsor women's golf, with the latter having dropped both of its golf teams after the 2025–26 season. Rice added the sport in 2026–27.

| Year | Champion |
|---|---|
| 2014 | Louisville^{†} |
| 2015 | UCF^{†} |
| 2016 | Houston^{†} |
| 2017 | UCF^{†} |
| 2018 | Houston^{†} |
| 2019 | Houston^{†} |
| 2020 | Not played due to COVID-19 |
| 2021 | UCF^{†} |
| 2022 | Tulane |
| 2023 | SMU^{†} |
| 2024 | SMU^{†} |
| 2025 | Tulsa |
| 2026 | Tulsa |

†: No longer members of the conference

== Women's lacrosse ==
Four full conference members offer women's lacrosse, which The American first sponsored in the 2019 season. These schools are Charlotte, East Carolina, South Florida, and Temple. Three affiliate members also compete: James Madison, Old Dominion, and Vanderbilt.

The most recent departures from American Conference women's lacrosse are affiliate members Cincinnati and Florida. Cincinnati had kept women's lacrosse in the American after otherwise leaving for the Big 12 Conference in 2023, but left after the spring 2024 season when the Big 12 began sponsoring the sport. Florida followed Cincinnati to Big 12 women's lacrosse.

| Year | Regular Season champion | Tournament champion |
|---|---|---|
| 2019 | Florida^{†} | |
| 2020 | Not played due to COVID-19 | |
| 2021 | Florida^{†} | |
| 2022 | Florida^{†} | |
| 2023 | James Madison | Florida^{†} |
| 2024 | Florida^{†} | |
| 2025 | James Madison | |
| 2026 | South Florida | James Madison |

†: No longer members of the conference

== Women's rowing ==
The American dropped women's rowing after the 2023–24 school year. In the final season, full members SMU, Temple, and Tulsa were joined by affiliate members Old Dominion and Sacramento State. Villanova competed as an affiliate member in rowing from 2013 to 2015 before leaving for the Colonial Athletic Association (now known as the Coastal Athletic Association) and San Diego State competed as an affiliate member in rowing from 2015 to 2021 but discontinued its program because of financial difficulties caused by the COVID-19 pandemic.

SMU left for the Atlantic Coast Conference in 2024, leading the American to drop the sport. Old Dominion and Tulsa became affiliates of the Big 12 Conference; Sacramento State became an affiliate of the West Coast Conference; and Temple was an independent for the 2024–25 school year before becoming an affiliate of the Mid-American Conference.

| Year | Champion |
|---|---|
| 2014 | Louisville^{†} |
| 2015 | UCF^{†} |
| 2016 | UCF^{†} |
| 2017 | UCF^{†} |
| 2018 | UCF^{†} |
| 2019 | UCF^{†} |
| 2020 | Not played due to COVID-19 |
| 2021 | SMU^{†} |
| 2022 | SMU^{†} |
| 2023 | SMU^{†} |
| 2024 | SMU^{†} |

†: No longer members of the conference

== Men's soccer ==
Men's soccer is offered by seven full members of the conference: Charlotte, FAU, Memphis, South Florida, Temple, Tulsa, and UAB; it is also sponsored by affiliate member FIU. Cincinnati also had a men's soccer team before cutting it in April 2020. Charlotte, FAU, FIU and UAB joined the conference in 2022–23 as affiliate members for men's soccer. This was one year before those schools (besides FIU) joined as full members.

| Year | Regular Season champion | Tournament champion |
|---|---|---|
| 2013 | Louisville^{†} | South Florida |
| 2014 | UConn^{†} | Tulsa |
| 2015 | SMU^{†} | Tulsa |
| 2016 | South Florida | Tulsa |
| 2017 | SMU^{†} | |
| 2018 | UCF^{†} | SMU^{†} |
| 2019 | UCF^{†} | SMU^{†} |
| 2020 | UCF^{†} | |
| 2021 | Tulsa | |
| 2022 | FIU | |
| 2023 | SMU^{†} | Charlotte |
| 2024 | Memphis | Charlotte |
| 2025 | Charlotte | Florida Atlantic |

†: No longer members of the conference

== Women's soccer ==
Women's soccer is sponsored by every school in the conference except Tulane and Wichita State.

| Year | Regular Season champion | Tournament champion |
|---|---|---|
| 2013 | UCF^{†} | |
| 2014 | UCF^{†} | UConn^{†} |
| 2015 | UConn^{†} | Cincinnati^{†} |
| 2016 | UConn^{†} | |
| 2017 | UCF^{†} | South Florida |
| 2018 | South Florida | Memphis |
| 2019 | Memphis | South Florida |
| 2020 | South Florida | |
| 2021 | South Florida | Memphis |
| 2022 | UCF^{†} | Memphis |
| 2023 | Memphis | |
| 2024 | Memphis | East Carolina |
| 2025 | Memphis | UTSA |

†: No longer members of the conference

== Softball ==
Softball is sponsored by 10 of the 13 schools in the conference, the exceptions being Rice, Temple, and Tulane (though Temple sponsored it until 2014).

| Year | Regular Season champion | Tournament champion |
|---|---|---|
| 2014 | UCF^{†} | Louisville^{†} |
| 2015 | UCF^{†} | |
| 2016 | South Florida | Tulsa |
| 2017 | Tulsa | |
| 2018 | South Florida | Tulsa |
| 2019 | South Florida | Tournament canceled due to weather (Note: The tournament title officially went unawarded. Under conference rules for this scenario, South Florida was given the AAC's autobid to the NCAA tournament as the regular season champion.) |
| 2020 | No games played due to COVID-19 | |
| 2021 | Wichita State | |
| 2022 | UCF^{†} | |
| 2023 | Wichita State | UCF^{†} |
| 2024 | Charlotte | Charlotte |
| 2024 | Florida Atlantic | Charlotte |
| 2025 | Florida Atlantic | South Florida |
| 2026 | South Florida | South Florida |
| 2026 | Wichita State | South Florida |

†: No longer members of the conference

== Men's swimming and diving ==
The American dropped men's swimming & diving after the 2022–23 season. Of the conference's 13 members in 2024–25, only Florida Atlantic offers men's swimming and diving. East Carolina competed in the sport until 2020 but eliminated the program in the wake of the COVID-19 pandemic. Both FAU and SMU joined the Atlantic Sun Conference for that conference's inaugural swimming & diving season in 2023–24, with SMU moving from there to the ACC in 2024–25.

| Year | Champion |
|---|---|
| 2014 | Louisville^{†} |
| 2015 | East Carolina |
| 2016 | East Carolina |
| 2017 | East Carolina |
| 2018 | Cincinnati^{†} |
| 2019 | Cincinnati^{†} |
| 2020 | East Carolina |
| 2021 | SMU |
| 2022 | SMU |
| 2023 | SMU |

†: No longer members of the conference

== Women's swimming and diving ==
In 2026–27, the conference features nine women's swimming and diving teams: full members FAU, East Carolina, (Note: ECU's women's swimming and diving team was discontinued after the 2019–20 season, but returned for 2021–22 after not fielding a team in the 2020–21 season.) North Texas, Rice, and Tulane plus affiliate members FIU, James Madison, Liberty, and Marshall. FAU, North Texas, and Rice joined as affiliate members along with FIU in 2022–23, the year before the former three joined the conference as full members. Note: Rice only competed in swimming until 2024–25, when it reinstated diving after an absence of more than 30 years.

| Year | Champion |
|---|---|
| 2014 | Louisville^{†} |
| 2015 | SMU |
| 2016 | SMU |
| 2017 | Houston^{†} |
| 2018 | Houston^{†} |
| 2019 | Houston^{†} |
| 2020 | Houston^{†} |
| 2021 | Houston^{†} |
| 2022 | Houston^{†} |
| 2023 | Houston^{†} |
| 2024 | FIU |
| 2025 | Rice |
| 2026 | Rice |

†: No longer members of the conference

== Men's tennis ==
Every school in the American apart from East Carolina and North Texas offers men's tennis; though East Carolina offered the sport until 2020 when it was dropped due to budget concerns brought on by COVID-19.

| Year | Champion |
|---|---|
| 2014 | South Florida |
| 2015 | South Florida |
| 2016 | South Florida |
| 2017 | South Florida |
| 2018 | Tulane |
| 2019 | South Florida |
| 2020 | Not played due to COVID-19 |
| 2021 | UCF^{†} |
| 2022 | SMU |
| 2023 | SMU |
| 2024 | Charlotte |
| 2025 | Rice |
| 2026 | Tulsa |

†: No longer members of the conference

== Women's tennis ==
All current American Conference schools sponsor women's tennis. (Note: ECU's women's tennis team was discontinued after the 2019–20 season, but returned for 2021–22 after not fielding a team in the 2020–21 season.)

| Year | Champion |
|---|---|
| 2014 | South Florida |
| 2015 | Tulsa |
| 2016 | Tulsa |
| 2017 | South Florida |
| 2018 | Tulsa |
| 2019 | UCF^{†} |
| 2020 | Not played due to COVID-19 |
| 2021 | UCF^{†} |
| 2022 | Memphis |
| 2023 | SMU^{†} |
| 2024 | SMU^{†} |
| 2025 | Memphis |
| 2026 | Rice |

†: No longer members of the conference

== Men's track and field ==
=== Men's indoor ===
Men's indoor track & field is sponsored by 9 of the current 13 full members, with the exceptions being Florida Atlantic, Temple, Tulane, and UAB. Temple sponsored the sport in 2014 but dropped it after that season.

| Year | Champion |
|---|---|
| 2014 | UConn^{†} |
| 2015 | Houston^{†} |
| 2016 | Houston^{†} |
| 2017 | Houston^{†} |
| 2018 | Houston^{†} |
| 2019 | Houston^{†} |
| 2020 | Houston^{†} |
| 2021 | Not held due to COVID-19 |
| 2022 | Houston^{†} |
| 2023 | Cincinnati^{†} |
| 2024 | South Florida |
| 2025 | South Florida |
| 2026 | North Texas |

=== Men's outdoor ===
Men's outdoor track and field is sponsored by all the same schools that sponsor men's indoor track and field with the addition of Tulane. Like with men's indoor track and field, Temple sponsored men's outdoor track and field until 2014.

| Year | Champion |
|---|---|
| 2014 | Houston^{†} |
| 2015 | UConn^{†} |
| 2016 | Houston^{†} |
| 2017 | Houston^{†} |
| 2018 | Houston^{†} |
| 2019 | Houston^{†} |
| 2020 | Not held due to COVID-19 |
| 2021 | Houston^{†} |
| 2022 | Wichita State |
| 2023 | Wichita State |
| 2024 | South Florida |
| 2025 | South Florida |
| 2026 | Wichita State |

†: No longer members of the conference

== Women's track and field ==
Every school in the conference sponsors both indoor and outdoor women's track and field.

=== Women's indoor ===
| Year | Champion |
|---|---|
| 2014 | SMU |
| 2015 | UConn^{†} |
| 2016 | UConn^{†} |
| 2017 | UCF^{†} |
| 2018 | Cincinnati^{†} |
| 2019 | Houston^{†} |
| 2020 | Houston^{†} |
| 2021 | Not held due to COVID-19 |
| 2022 | UCF^{†} |
| 2023 | UCF^{†} |
| 2024 | Charlotte |
| 2025 | Tulane |
| 2026 | South Florida |

=== Women's outdoor ===
| Year | Champion |
|---|---|
| 2014 | SMU |
| 2015 | SMU |
| 2016 | Cincinnati^{†} |
| 2017 | Cincinnati^{†} |
| 2018 | Houston^{†} |
| 2019 | Wichita State |
| 2020 | Not held due to COVID-19 |
| 2021 | Houston^{†} |
| 2022 | UCF^{†} |
| 2023 | UCF^{†} |
| 2024 | Charlotte |
| 2025 | Charlotte |
| 2026 | Rice |

†: No longer members of the conference

== Volleyball ==
Every American Conference school sponsors women's volleyball. No conference member sponsors men's volleyball.

| Year | Regular Season champion | Tournament champion |
|---|---|---|
| 2013 | Louisville^{†} | N/A (Note: The then-American Athletic Conference first sponsored a postseason tournament in volleyball in 2018, discontinuing it after the 2020–21 school year. The tournament was reinstated in 2024–25. In all other years, the regular season conference champion received the conference's autobid to the NCAA tournament.) |
| 2014 | UCF^{†} | N/A |
| 2015 | SMU^{†} | N/A |
| 2016 | SMU^{†} | N/A |
| 2017 | Wichita State | N/A |
| 2018 | UCF^{†} | |
| 2019 | Cincinnati^{†} | UCF^{†} |
| 2020 | UCF^{†} | |
| 2021 | UCF^{†} | N/A |
| 2022 | Houston^{†} | N/A |
| 2022 | UCF^{†} | N/A |
| 2022 | (tied) | N/A |
| 2023 | SMU^{†} | N/A |
| 2024 | South Florida | Wichita State |
| 2025 | Rice | Tulsa |

†: No longer members of the conference

== Summary ==
Note: Shared titles (ex: 2014 football, 2020 men's basketball) are counted as a full title for each co-champion.

Accurate as of June 14, 2023.

| School | Years in conference | Number of titles | Titles by sport | Sports played |
|---|---|---|---|---|
| UCF† | 2013–2023 | 46 | Baseball: 1 (1 regular season, 0 tournament); Women's basketball: 2 (1 regular season, 1 tournament); Football: 4 Women's golf: 3 Women's rowing: 5 Men's soccer: 4 (3 regular season, 1 tournament); Women's soccer: 5 (4 regular season, 1 tournament); Softball: 6 (3 regular season, 3 tournament); Men's tennis: 1 Women's tennis: 2 Women's track & field: 5 (3 indoor, 2 outdoor); Volleyball: 8 (5 regular season, 3 tournament) | 16: Baseball; Men's basketball Women's basketball Women's cross country Football; Men's golf Women's golf Women's rowing Men's soccer Women's soccer Softball; Men's tennis Women's tennis Women's indoor track and field Women's outdoor track and field Volleyball |
| Houston† | 2013–2023 | 41 | Baseball: 5 (3 regular season, 2 tournament); Men's basketball: 6 (4 regular season, 2 tournament); Football: 1 Men's golf: 1 Women's golf: 3 Women's swimming & diving: 7 Men's track & field: 13 (7 indoor, 6 outdoor); Women's track & field: 4 (2 indoor, 2 outdoor); Volleyball: 1 (1 regular season, 0 tournament) | 17: Baseball; Men's basketball Women's basketball Men's cross country Women's cross country Football; Men's golf Women's golf Women's soccer Softball; Women's swimming and diving Women's tennis Men's indoor track and field Men's outdoor track and field Women's indoor track and field Women's outdoor track and field Volleyball |
| SMU | 2013–present | 30 | Men's basketball: 4 (2 regular season, 2 tournament); Women's cross country: 2 Men's golf: 2 Women's golf: 1 Women's rowing: 3 Men's soccer: 5 (2 regular season, 3 tournament); Men's swimming & diving: 3 Women's swimming & diving: 2 Men's tennis: 2 Women's tennis: 1 Women's track & field: 3 (1 indoor, 2 outdoor); Volleyball: 2 (2 regular season, 0 tournament) | 16: Men's basketball Women's basketball Women's cross country Football; Men's golf Women's golf Women's rowing Men's soccer Women's soccer Men's swimming and diving Women's swimming and diving Men's tennis Women's tennis Women's indoor track and field Women's outdoor track and field Volleyball |
| Tulsa | 2014–present | 28 | Men's basketball: 1 (1 regular season, 0 tournament); Men's cross country: 9 Women's cross country: 6 Men's soccer: 5 (1 regular season, 4 tournament); Softball: 4 (1 regular season, 3 tournament); Women's tennis: 3 | 17: (Note: Tulsa had 18 teams compete in AAC play from 2014–16 and 17 in all other years); Men's basketball Women's basketball Men's cross country Women's cross country Football; Men's golf (until 2015–16); Women's golf Women's rowing Men's soccer Women's soccer Softball; Men's tennis Women's tennis Men's indoor track and field Men's outdoor track and field Women's indoor track and field Women's outdoor track and field Volleyball |
| South Florida | 2013–present | 27 | Baseball: 1 (0 regular season, 1 tournament); Women's basketball: 3 (2 regular season, 1 tournament); Men's golf: 5 Men's soccer: 2 (1 regular season, 1 tournament); Women's soccer: 6 (3 regular season, 3 tournament); Softball: 3 (3 regular season, 0 tournament); Men's tennis: 5 Women's tennis: 2 | 18: Baseball; Men's basketball Women's basketball Men's cross country Women's cross country Football; Men's golf Women's golf Men's soccer Women's soccer Softball; Men's tennis Women's tennis Men's indoor track and field Men's outdoor track and field Women's indoor track and field Women's outdoor track and field Volleyball |
| UConn† | 2013–2020 | 26 | Baseball: 1 (0 regular season, 1 tournament); Men's basketball: 1 (0 regular season, 1 tournament); Women's basketball: 14 (7 regular season, 7 tournament); Women's cross country: 1 Men's soccer: 1 (1 regular season, 0 tournament); Women's soccer: 4 (2 regular season, 2 tournament); Men's track & field: 2 (1 indoor, 1 outdoor); Women's track & field: 2 (2 indoor, 0 outdoor) | 21: (Note: UConn had 20 teams compete in AAC play from 2013–18 and 21 in all other years); Baseball; Men's basketball Women's basketball Men's cross country Women's cross country Football; Men's golf Women's lacrosse (beginning in 2018–19); Women's rowing Men's soccer Women's soccer Softball; Men's swimming and diving Women's swimming and diving Men's tennis Women's tennis Men's indoor track and field Men's outdoor track and field Women's indoor track and field Women's outdoor track and field Volleyball |
| Cincinnati† | 2013–2023 | 17 | Baseball: 1 (0 regular season, 1 tournament); Men's basketball: 5 (3 regular season, 2 tournament); Football: 3 Women's soccer: 1 (0 regular season, 1 tournament); Men's swimming & diving: 2 Men's track & field: 1 (1 indoor, 0 outdoor); Women's track & field: 3 (1 indoor, 2 outdoor); Volleyball: 1 (1 regular season, 0 tournament) | 18: (Note: Cincinnati had 19 teams compete in AAC play from 2018–20 and 18 in all other years); Baseball; Men's basketball Women's basketball Men's cross country Women's cross country Football; Men's golf Women's golf Women's lacrosse (beginning in 2018–19); Men's soccer (until 2019–20); Women's soccer Men's swimming and diving Women's swimming and diving Women's tennis Men's indoor track and field Men's outdoor track and field Women's indoor track and field Women's outdoor track and field Volleyball |
| East Carolina | 2014–present | 12 | Baseball: 7 (4 regular season, 3 tournament); Women's basketball: 1 (0 regular season, 1 tournament); Men's swimming & diving: 4 | 18: (Note: ECU had 19 teams compete in AAC play from 2014–18, 20 from 2018–20, 16 in 2020–21, and 18 in all other years); Baseball; Men's basketball Women's basketball Men's cross country Women's cross country Football; Men's golf Women's golf Women's lacrosse (beginning in 2018–19); Women's soccer Softball; Men's swimming and diving (until 2019–20); Women's swimming and diving (on hiatus in 2020–21); Men's tennis (until 2019–20); Women's tennis (on hiatus in 2020–21); Men's indoor track and field Men's outdoor track and field Women's indoor track and field Women's outdoor track and field Volleyball |
| Louisville† | 2013–2014 | 9* | Baseball: 1 (1 regular season, 0 tournament); Men's basketball: 2 (1 regular season, 1 tournament), vacated Men's cross country: 1 Women's golf: 1 Women's rowing: 1 Men's soccer: 1 (1 regular season, 0 tournament); Softball: 1 (0 regular season, 1 tournament); Men's swimming & diving: 1 Women's swimming & diving: 1 Volleyball: 1 (1 regular season, 0 tournament) | 21: Baseball; Men's basketball Women's basketball Men's cross country Women's cross country Football; Men's golf Women's golf Women's rowing Men's soccer Women's soccer Softball; Men's swimming and diving Women's swimming and diving Men's tennis Women's tennis Men's indoor track and field Men's outdoor track and field Women's indoor track and field Women's outdoor track and field Volleyball |
| Memphis | 2013–present | 9 | Men's basketball: 1 (0 regular season, 1 tournament); Football: 2 Men's golf: 1 Women's soccer: 4 (1 regular season, 3 tournament); Women's tennis: 1 | 18: Baseball; Men's basketball Women's basketball Men's cross country Women's cross country Football; Men's golf Women's golf Men's soccer Women's soccer Softball; Men's tennis Women's tennis Men's indoor track and field Men's outdoor track and field Women's indoor track and field Women's outdoor track and field Volleyball |
| Wichita State | 2017–present | 9 | Men's basketball: 1 (1 regular season, 0 tournament); Women's cross country: 1 Softball: 3 (2 regular season, 1 tournament); Men's track & field: 2 (0 indoor, 2 outdoor); Women's track & field: 1 (0 indoor, 1 outdoor); Volleyball: 1 (1 regular season, 0 tournament) | 15: Baseball; Men's basketball Women's basketball Men's cross country Women's cross country Men's golf Women's golf Softball; Men's tennis Women's tennis Men's indoor track and field Men's outdoor track and field Women's indoor track and field Women's outdoor track and field Volleyball |
| Florida‡ | 2018–present | 7 | Women's lacrosse: 7 (3 regular season, 4 tournament) | 1: Women's lacrosse |
| Tulane | 2014–present | 5 | Baseball: 2 (1 regular season, 1 tournament); Football: 1 Women's golf: 1 Men's tennis: 1 | 14: Baseball; Men's basketball Women's basketball Men's cross country Women's cross country Football; Women's golf Women's swimming and diving Men's tennis Women's tennis Men's outdoor track and field Women's indoor track and field Women's outdoor track and field Volleyball |
| FIU‡ | 2022–present | 2 | Men's soccer: 2 (1 regular season, 1 tournament) | 2: Men's soccer Women's swimming and diving |
| Temple | 2013–present | 2 | Men's basketball: 1 (1 regular season, 0 tournament); Football: 1 | 15: (Note: Temple had 17 teams compete in AAC play in 2013–14, 14 from 2014–18, and 15 in all other years); Baseball (until 2013–14); Men's basketball Women's basketball Men's cross country Women's cross country Football; Men's golf Women's lacrosse (beginning in 2018–19); Women's rowing Men's soccer Women's soccer Softball (until 2013–14); Men's tennis Women's tennis Men's indoor track and field (until 2013–14); Men's outdoor track and field (until 2013–14); Women's indoor track and field Women's outdoor track and field Volleyball |
| James Madison‡ | 2022–present | 1 | Women's lacrosse: 1 (1 regular season, 0 tournament) | 1: Women's lacrosse |
| Navy‡ | 2015–present | 0 | – | 1: Football |
| Old Dominion‡ | 2018–present | 0 | – | 2: (Note: Old Dominion had 1 team compete in AAC play from 2018–20 and 2 in all other years); Women's lacrosse Women's rowing (beginning in 2020–21) |
| Sacramento State‡ | 2015–present | 0 | – | 1: Women's rowing |
| Vanderbilt‡ | 2018–present | 0 | – | 1: Women's lacrosse |
| Rutgers† | 2013–2014 | 0 | – | 19: Baseball; Men's basketball Women's basketball Men's cross country Women's cross country Football; Men's golf Women's golf Women's rowing Men's soccer Women's soccer Softball; Women's swimming and diving Women's tennis Men's indoor track and field Men's outdoor track and field Women's indoor track and field Women's outdoor track and field Volleyball |
| San Diego State†‡ | 2015–2021 | 0 | – | 1: Women's rowing |
| Villanova†‡ | 2013–2015 | 0 | – | 1 Women's rowing |

*- Does not include vacated championships

†- No longer a member of the AAC

‡- Affiliate member

== See also ==
- American Conference baseball tournament
- American Conference men's basketball tournament
- American Conference women's basketball tournament
- American Conference Football Championship Game
- American Conference men's soccer tournament
- American Conference women's soccer tournament
- American Conference softball tournament
