= Dick Sloan =

American college athlete and swimming coach

Richard H. "Dick" Sloan
Biographical details
- Born: circa 1937
- Died: 28 December 2024
- Education: Monmouth College; B.A. 1959; University of Illinois; M.A. 1966

Playing career
- 1955–1959: Monmouth College
- Positions: Swimming, tennis teams Defensive back Football

Coaching career (HC unless noted)
- 1961–1966: University of Illinois; Graduate student Asst. swim and football coach
- 1966–1968: Lakewood High School; Head swim coach
- 1968–1975: Kenyon College; Head swim coach (Tennis, football coach)
- 1975–1989: Ohio State; Head swim coach Retired
- 1989–1998: Ohio State; Asst. to director athletics

Head coaching record
- Overall: 48-25-1; Kenyon tennis team

Accomplishments and honors

Championships
- 7 Ohio Athletic Conference championships ('68-'75) (Kenyon College) 8 Big Ten Conference Champions (Ohio State)

Richard H. "Dick" Sloan was an American college athlete and swimming coach best known for his fourteen-year tenure at Ohio State University from 1975 to 1989. From 1968 to 1975, he coached both tennis and swimming at Kenyon College where his team won seven consecutive Ohio Athletic Conference (OAC) Championships. He died on December 28, 2024, at the age of 88.

== Education, early swimming ==
=== Evanston High School ===
A native of Evanston, Illinois, Sloan attended Evanston High School where he was on the tennis team. The team won 52 consecutive matches before their winning streak was broken in April 1954.

=== Monmouth College ===
Sloan was a 1959 graduate of Monmouth College in Monmouth, Illinois, where he lettered two years as a defensive end in football. He was also a three-year letter winner in tennis and swimming. At Monmouth College, he studied education.

During the summers he worked as a lifeguard, primarily at Illinois pools, and for the summer of 1957 around the age of 19, at the Epworth Heights Resort in Ludington, Michigan, sometimes known as Epworth Assembly. Dick had spent at least part of 11 prior summers at Epworth Heights, likely spending some time at the beach. He also lifeguarded at the Westmoreland Club in Wilmette, and Evanston Golf Club in Skokie, and had taught swimming and lifeguarded at the Monmouth YMCA during his college years. At Epworth Heights in June 1957, he taught both group and private swimming lessons, and helped to organize two swim meets.

== Swim coaching positions ==
While pursuing his master's degree at the University of Illinois, he had his first position as assistant swim coach from 1962 to 1966 where he helped produce five All-Americans in swimming. At Illinois, he also spent three years as an assistant freshman football coach, and spent several years teaching physical education.

From 1966 to 1968, he coached swimming at Lakewood High School, near Cleveland.

=== Kenyon College Swimming Coach ===
From 1968 to 1975, he was head swimming coach at Kenyon College, where he led the team to seven Ohio Conference Championships, and second place at the NCAA championship in 1969. He was also a head tennis coach and was an assistant coach to the football team while at Kenyon. As tennis coach, he led the team to win the 1970 Ohio Athletic Conference Title, securing an overall dual meet record of 48–25–1.

For six successive summers prior to 1975, Sloan continued to work as an activities director at Epworth Heights Resort, where he had formerly been a lifeguard and swim instructor in his youth.

== Ohio State head swimming coach ==
He was probably best known for his fourteen-year tenure as head swimming coach at Ohio State University from 1975 to 1989, where his buckeye team had four All-Americans, two national titlists in U.S. Swimming, and eight Big 10 Conference champions.

Sloan may have struggled a bit his first year as head swim coach at OSU, where his team went 5–7 by March 1976, but their diving team was still dominant in the Big 10 and winning seasons for the swimmers were soon in store. By 1978, OSU would finish in second place in the Big 10 Conference. Division 1 swimming at Ohio State included competition as fierce as Indiana University's team coached by Olympic coach James "Doc" Councilman. In 1981, Sloan signed Coshocton High School All American Bill Clark, a specialist in the 50, 100, and 200 freestyle events, where he would be joined by distance swimmer Greg Masica, who was a distance specialist, who swam for the Coshocton, Ohio Swim Club. In 1982, Sloan coached David Cowell, who was on the U.S. Swimming Coaches All American Squad for his performance in the 100-yard Butterfly and at 54.40 for the 100-meter fly, was only one second off the world record for the event.

From 1987 to 1998, he served as special assistant to the director of athletics at Ohio State University. He managed events and facilities in this position, which included practices and athletic events, high school athletic events at OSU, concerts, sports camps, and clinics.

In 1984, he was a swim coach for U.S. Swimming's International Team.

=== Retirement ===
Sloan retired from swim coaching in 1989, and as Ohio State assistant to the director of athletics in 1998, and both he and his wife Diane retired to South Carolina.
