= Hilton Woods =

Dutch Antillean swimmer (1968–2026)

Personal information
- Born: 10 September 1968
- Died: 22 January 2026 (aged 57)

Sport
- Sport: Swimming
- Strokes: Freestyle
- College team: Oakland University
- Coach: Pete Hovland (Oakland)
Medal record
Representing Netherlands Antilles
Pan American Games
Bronze medal – third place	1987 Indianapolis	50m freestyle

Hilton Woods (10 September 1968 – 22 January 2026) was a Dutch Antillean swimmer who swam for Michigan's Oakland University, and represented the Netherlands Antilles at the 1984 Los Angeles and 1988 Korea Olympics.

== Olympics ==
Woods competed at the 1984 Summer Olympics and the 1988 Summer Olympics. Participating in the 1984 Los Angeles Olympics at 15, Woods competed in the 100-meter freestyle, placing 40th with a time of 53.92 in his preliminary heat. He was around 3.6 seconds from medal contention among the swimmers who made the finals.

At the 1988 Seoul Olympics on 24 September 1988, as a Sophomore at Oakland, he improved to 16th overall in the 100-meter freestyle with a time of 51.25 only around 1.6 seconds from medal contention, had he made the finals. He was 16th overall in the 50-meter freestyle with a time of 23.65, around .94 seconds from medal contention had he made the finals. He served as the flag bearer for his country at the Olympic procession. Pete Hovland, Woods's coach at Oakland University coached the Netherlands Antilles swim team at the 1988 Olympics, though Woods was the only swimming competitor.

In April 1987, Woods became the first Black swimmer to break a YMCA national record, swimming his best event, the 50-meter freestyle, in a time of 20.82 at the National YMCA Swimming and Diving Championships at the Justus Aquatic Center in greater Orlando, Florida, now the Rosen Aquatic Center. The record was broken the same day by Tim Jackson, a Black swimmer from Bolles High School in a time of 20.64.

== Pan American games ==
In international competition at the age of only 18, Woods won a bronze medal in his most competitive event, the 50 metre freestyle with a time of 23.39 at the 10th annual 1987 Pan American Games in Indianapolis on 14 August 1987. He officially represented the United States at the games. In the 100-meter freestyle, in which Woods also competed, he swam a 52.13.7, placing sixth in the fierce international competition. At the collegiate level, as he would attend a Division II NCAA University, Woods would be nationally ranked in the event.

== Oakland University ==
Woods attended Michigan's Oakland University beginning around 1988. He graduated Oakland in 1992 with a medical laboratory science degree, and competed and trained with their swim team under Head Coach Pete Hovland. He was an outstanding swimmer at Oakland, helping to win four consecutive team GLIAC Conference titles and four NCAA National Division II second-place team finishes while at Oakland. A three-time All-American, Woods finished in first place in over 14 total championship events spanning both the conference and national level.

As a Freshman at Oakland, at the 1988 Championship of the Great Lakes Interscholastic Athletic Conference, he won the 50m Freestyle, 100m Freestyle, 100m Backstroke, and 400m Relay. Also excelling at the national level, he won the 50 freestyle at the National Championship three times from 1988 to 90, as well as the 200m Freestyle in 1989, and the 100m Freestyle in 1990. Competing with relay teams, he twice won National titles in the 800m Freestyle Relay in 1988 and 89 as well as winning the 400m Freestyle Relay three times from 1988 to 90.

He was admitted to the Oakland University Athletic Hall of Fame in 2024, and was an NCAA Division II Swimmer of the year during his time at Oakland.

== Personal life and death ==
Woods grew up in Willemstad, Curacao in the Netherlands Antilles.

He died on 22 January 2026, at the age of 57.
