= Pete Hovland =

American swimming coach (born 1954)

Biographical details
- Born: August 17, 1954 (age 72); Shasta, California
- Education: Chico State 1977

Playing career
- 1973–1976: Chico State; Ernest Maglischo, Coach
- Position: Freestyle

Coaching career (HC unless noted)
- 1979–1981: Oakland University; Asst. Men's Coach
- 1981–2023: Oakland University; Head coach

Head coaching record
- Overall: 275–111 71.2 winning % (Oakland Men thru '21); 163–78 67.6 winning % (Oakland Women thru '21)

Accomplishments and honors

Championships
- 4 x NCAA Div. II Championships 94–97; 43 Conference Championships (Oakland Men)

Awards
- 29xConference Coach of Year M&W; Summit League Hall of Fame; Michigan Sports Hall of Fame; ASCA Greatest 100 Coaches

Peter Neal Hovland (August 17, 1954–) was a competitive swimmer for Chico State, and an Assistant and Head coach for Michigan's Oakland University from 1979 to 2023, where he led the men's team to four consecutive NCAA national titles from 1994 to 1997, and an exceptional forty-four consecutive conference championships from 1979 to 2023. He simultaneously led the women's team to 21 conference titles through his retirement at Oakland in 1923. As of 2023, his span of service as a head coach for Oakland was tied for the second-longest of any NCAA Division I head coach. Recognized as a greatly more competitive swim program, Oakland moved from NCAA Division II to Division I in 1997 during Hovland's time as a coach.

Hovland was born August 17, 1954, in Shasta, California, but grew up in the San Jose Valley area. He swam as a youngster at the local San Jose YMCA, which would later combine with the renowned Santa Clara Swim Club. He later attended nearby Campbell High School in Campbell, California, 50 miles Southeast of San Francisco in the North central coastal area of California. Representing Campbell High at the age of 16 in West Valley Athletic League Competition in May, 1971, he won the 200 freestyle in 1:51.2, and the 100 freestyle in a West Valley Athletic League record time of 49.2.

== Chico State swimmer ==
In the Fall of 1972, Hovland began attending Chico State in Chico, California, in the state's North Central region, 90 minutes North of Sacramento. In his first year, he swam with All American swimmers Steve Battin, Jerry Roster, Bob Grieve, and Jeff Lamb on the swimming roster. Hovland swam for four years, and officially received his B.S. in 1977, while majoring in Physical Education, which later helped transition him to a role as a collegiate coach. He swam middle-distance freestyle, finishing in the upper echelon of Division II competition and was coached and trained by Dr. Ernie Maglischo. Maglischo, coached at Chico State from 1966 to 1976, led the team to four Western Conference titles, and was named Northern California's College Coach of the Year in June 1972, shortly before Hovland began as a swimmer.

As a consistent high point in Hovlands swimming career at Chico State, the team won four consecutive NCAA Swimming and Diving Team Championships from 1973 to 1976 under the coaching of Dr. Ernest Maglischo. Hovland held six Chico State school records which were also NCAA records by the time he ended his Chico State swimming career in 1976.

=== Four NCAA Championships at Chico ===
Already excelling in his Freshman year at Chico State, at the 1973 Division II NCAA Championships, Hovland swam for the record breaking 4x200-yard freestyle relay team of Bruce Oliver, Neil Glenesk, and Chis Webb, which set a new national record of 7:06.6 minutes. At Chico State's 1976 Division II NCAA Championships in Springfield, Massachusetts, Hovland and the team won the title with a record 428 points over Northridge State and a record 145 point margin of victory, the largest lead over a second place team in the history of NCAA championships. Winning their fourth straight championship, the team had moved up from Division III the prior year to Division II. Hovland had six gold medals at the 1976 NCAA national championship meet, winning the 100-yard freestyle in an NCAA record time of :46.08, and swimming on a winning 4x100-yard freestyle relay team that set an NCAA record time of 3:04.5. Hovland also won the 50-yard freestyle in non-record time, won the 200-yard freestyle with a 1:40.416 and swam on the winning 400 medley and 800 freestyle relay teams. In 1976, for his swimming achievements at Chico State, Hovland was chosen to be the Far Western Conference (FWC) Athlete of the Year.

Hovland's coach Dr. Ernie Maglischo at Chico State, was Oakland's women's team coach when Pete began working as an Assistant Coach in 1979. After Chico State, Hovland completed a Masters at the University of Northern Iowa in 1979. While completing his degree at Chico State in 1977, Hovland briefly worked as an Assistant Coach under Chico State Coach Clark Yeager.

== Oakland University coach ==
After graduating Chico State in 1977, and completing graduate school, Hovland began coaching the Oakland University golden grizzlies swim team in 1979 as the Women's team Head Coach and the Men's team Assistant Coach. Oakland is located in Rochester, Michigan, about 40 minutes North of Detroit, and was an NCAA Division II competitor at the time. Hovland was recruited to Oakland by his former Chico State Coach Dr. Ernie Maglischo. He was mentored by Maglischo during his first year coaching the women's team at Oakland State, and said of Maglischo, his swimming and coaching mentor, that "He was a scientist", and "was considered one of the brightest swimming minds in the world.” Hovland also noted that Maglischo had "written some of the best books on the sport". Hovland assumed the Head Coaching position at Oakland in 1981, where he led the Golden Grizzlies for 42 years. Hovland's men's teams won four NCAA Division II team national championships between 1994 and 1997 with 54 individual national champions.

Hovland also coached for a period during his early years at Oakland University for the Oakland Live Y-ers swim program, a youth program that met at the Oakland University pool. Oakland University's collegiate men's teams under Hovland won their respective conference 44 times, making them undefeated in conference championships. He also led the women's program for 24 years spanning two intervals: initially during the 1979–1980 and 1980–1981 seasons, and then consecutively for 22 years, from 2001 to 2023. Pete was a coach for the women's program when they won their fifth National Championship. After his retirement Hovland was replaced in 2023 by acting Associate Coach Mitch Alters, who had formerly swum for Hovland at Oakland.

=== Outstanding swimmers coached ===
Hovland had many outstanding swimmers as a coach, and several who became coaches. Mike Koleber, a 1984 graduate of Oakland, served as swim team captain, won 11 NCAA national titles between 1984 and 1987, and later helped found the large Nitro Center swimming facility in Cedar Park, in greater Austin, Texas where he had served as head coach. Koliber also served as a President on the Board of the American Swimming Coaches Association. Tracy Huth swam for Hovland through 1984, and was a team captain his Senior Year. Huth would later coach Oakland's Women's swim team from 1987 to 1997, leading them to five Division II NCAA Championships from 1990 to 1994, and later serve as an athletic administrator and director at Oakland through 2014. Mitch Alters, who became head coach at Oakland in 2023, had swum for Hovland, served as team Captain around 2013–2015, and had coached at the University of Richmond. Haitham Hazem, participated in the 2000 Olympics for the Egyptian Olympic team in the butterfly, IM and backstroke. Eric McIlquham, a 1992 graduate of Oakland, and a swimmer for the men's team, coached the Egyptian Olympic team in 1996 and 2000, and coached for the University of West Virginia. Hovland would also coach Sean Peters at Oakland, who would later serve as a coach for Michigan's Wayne State University.

1992 Oakland graduate Hilton Woods, a native of Curaçao, represented the Netherlands Antilles in the 1988 Olympic Games and also participated in the 1984 Olympics. Hovland attended the 1988 Olympic games with Woods, and served as the swim coach for the Netherlands Antilles. Hovland also coached Olympians at the 2000 Olympic games.

In his 43-year career, Hovland, who won his team conference nearly every year he coached, had 763 individual conference champions consisting of 434 men, and 329 women. He had 29 total conference coach of the year awards, consisting of 16 for his men's teams and 13 for his women's teams. Hovland had 14 NCAA Division I Championship qualifiers consisting of 9 men and 5 women, though his teams at Oakland were Division II through 1997 for much of his coaching tenure.

In service to the swimming community, Hovland served as a member of the Rules Committee for NCAA Swimming and Diving and prior to 1998 was a member of the College Swim Coaches Association of America (CSCAA) Board of Directors.

=== Honors ===
Hovland was a 1998 inductee into the Chico State Hall of Honor and a 2009 inductee into the City of Chico Hall of Fame. As a swimmer, Hovland was a 1976 NCAA Division II Swimmer-of-the-Year, and in what was likely his most accomplished years as a collegiate swimmer, was a 1976 Chico State Senior Athlete-of-the-Year.

A regional standout, he was inducted into the Michigan Sports Hall of Fame in 2016. With his teams winning an unprecedented 14 consecutive Summit League conference championships, he was elected to the Summit League Hall of Fame, where his teams competed from 1999 to 2013, winning the Summit Conference each year. He was named conference coach of the year 23 times which spanned Hovland's time coaching Oakland's swim teams in two separate conferences. Hovland was a six-time NCAA Coach of the Year during his career, and mentored a total of seven NCAA Swimmers of the Year.

In a somewhat more exclusive honor, near the end of his coaching career, Hovland was elected to the American Swimming Coaches Association (ASCA), Greatest 100 Coaches of the Century, along with Oakland's former women's swim team Coach Tracy Huth. His former coach at Chico State, Dr. Ernie Maglischo, who helped recruit him to Oakland, also was elected to the honor.
