= Swimming at the 2011 World Aquatics Championships – Women's 200 metre backstroke =

Women's 200 metre backstroke at the 2011 World Aquatics Championships
- Dates: July 29, 2011 (heats and semifinals); July 30, 2011 (final)
- Competitors: 41 from 34 nations
- Winning time: 2:05.10

Medalists
gold medal	Missy Franklin	United States
silver medal	Belinda Hocking	Australia
bronze medal	Sharon van Rouwendaal	Netherlands

The women's 200 metre backstroke competition of the swimming events at the 2011 World Aquatics Championships was held on July 29 with the heats and the semifinals and July 30 with the final.

The final was won by sixteen-year-old American Missy Franklin in a time of 2:05.10. Franklin's time was the third-fastest ever in the event, only behind Zimbabwean Kirsty Coventry (2:04.81) and Russian Anastasia Zuyeva (2:04.94).

== Records ==
Prior to the competition, the existing world and championship record were as follows.

	Name	Nation	Time	Location	Date
World record Championship record	Kirsty Coventry	Zimbabwe	2:04.81	Rome	August 1, 2009

== Results ==
=== Heats ===
39 swimmers participated in 6 heats.

Rank	Heat	Lane	Name	Nationality	Time	Notes
1	5	3	Missy Franklin	United States	2:07.71	Q
2	4	7	Daryna Zevina	Ukraine	2:08.35	Q
3	4	5	Elizabeth Beisel	United States	2:08.40	Q
4	4	4	Belinda Hocking	Australia	2:08.50	Q
5	6	5	Meagen Nay	Australia	2:08.50	Q
6	4	6	Sinead Russell	Canada	2:08.92	Q
7	4	3	Kirsty Coventry	Zimbabwe	2:09.03	Q
8	5	5	Shiho Sakai	Japan	2:09.25	Q
9	4	1	Sharon van Rouwendaal	Netherlands	2:09.65	Q
10	5	4	Elizabeth Simmonds	Great Britain	2:10.02	Q
11	5	6	Alexianne Castel	France	2:10.38	Q
12	6	4	Zhao Jing	China	2:10.40	Q
13	6	1	Duane da Rocha	Spain	2:10.41	Q
14	4	2	Melissa Ingram	New Zealand	2:10.59	Q
15	6	2	Stephanie Proud	Great Britain	2:10.65	Q
16	5	7	Genevieve Cantin	Canada	2:11.09	Q
17	6	3	Anastasia Zuyeva	Russia	2:11.23	
18	6	6	Zhu Jiani	China	2:11.84	
19	3	1	Fernanda González	Mexico	2:12.29	NR
20	6	7	Jenny Mensing	Germany	2:12.38	
21	3	7	Anja Čarman	Slovenia	2:12.73	
22	4	8	Kimberly Buys	Belgium	2:13.01	
23	3	4	Melanie Nocher	Ireland	2:13.39	
24	6	8	Simona Baumrtova	Czech Republic	2:13.48	
25	2	3	Anna Volchkov	Israel	2:13.99	NR
26	5	1	Alicja Tchorz	Poland	2:14.27	
27	3	5	Ekaterina Avramova	Bulgaria	2:14.85	
28	3	6	Ham Chan-Mi	South Korea	2:14.88	
29	3	8	Lau Yin Yan	Hong Kong	2:15.09	
30	2	5	Eyglo Gustafsdottir	Iceland	2:15.16	
31	2	4	Leone Vorster	South Africa	2:16.45	
3 2	5	8	Sophia Batachelor	New Zealand	2:17.06	
33	3	3	Therese Svendsen	Sweden	2:18.12	
34	2	6	Yulduz Kuchkarova	Uzbekistan	2:18.62	
35	2	7	Ines Remarsaro	Uruguay	2:21.07	
36	2	2	Tatiana Perstineva	Moldova	2:21.25	
37	1	4	Karen Vilorio	Honduras	2:24.43	
38	1	5	Estellah Fils Rabetsara	Madagascar	2:33.83	
39	1	3	Aure Fanchette	Seychelles	2:52.04	
–	3	2	Evelyn Verrasztó	Hungary		DNS
–	5	2	Aya Terakawa	Japan		DNS

=== Semifinals ===
The semifinals were held at 19:12.

==== Semifinal 1 ====
Rank	Lane	Name	Nationality	Time	Notes
1	5	Belinda Hocking	Australia	2:07.76	Q
2	4	Daryna Zevina	Ukraine	2:08.22	Q
3	2	Elizabeth Simmonds	Great Britain	2:08.79	Q
4	3	Sinead Russell	Canada	2:08.80	NR
5	7	Zhao Jing	China	2:08.86	
6	6	Shiho Sakai	Japan	2:08.93	
7	1	Melissa Ingram	New Zealand	2:10.77	
8	8	Genevieve Cantin	Canada	2:12.12	

==== Semifinal 2 ====
Rank	Lane	Name	Nationality	Time	Notes
1	4	Missy Franklin	United States	2:05.90	Q, AM
2	5	Elizabeth Beisel	United States	2:07.82	Q
3	7	Alexianne Castel	France	2:08.41	Q
4	2	Sharon van Rouwendaal	Netherlands	2:08.42	Q
5	3	Meagen Nay	Australia	2:08.53	Q
6	6	Kirsty Coventry	Zimbabwe	2:09.33	
7	8	Stephanie Proud	Great Britain	2:10.57	
8	1	Duane da Rocha	Spain	2:10.74	

=== Final ===
The final was held at 18:33.

Rank	Lane	Name	Nationality	Time	Notes
1st place, gold medalist(s)	4	Missy Franklin	United States	2:05.10	AM
2nd place, silver medalist(s)	5	Belinda Hocking	Australia	2:06.06	OC
3rd place, bronze medalist(s)	7	Sharon van Rouwendaal	Netherlands	2:07.78	NR
4	6	Daryna Zevina	Ukraine	2:07.82	NR
5	3	Elizabeth Beisel	United States	2:08.16	
6	1	Meagen Nay	Australia	2:08.69	
7	8	Elizabeth Simmonds	Great Britain	2:08.76	
8	2	Alexianne Castel	France	2:09.07	
