= Swimming at the 2012 Summer Olympics – Women's 200 metre backstroke =

Women's 200 metre backstroke at the Games of the XXX Olympiad
- Venue: London Aquatics Centre
- Dates: August 2, 2012 (heats & semifinals); August 3, 2012 (final)
- Competitors: 37 from 31 nations
- Winning time: 2:04.06 WR

Medalists
1st place, gold medalist(s)		Missy Franklin	United States
2nd place, silver medalist(s)		Anastasia Zuyeva	Russia
3rd place, bronze medalist(s)		Elizabeth Beisel	United States

The women's 200-metre backstroke event at the 2012 Summer Olympics took place on 2–3 August at the London Aquatics Centre in London, United Kingdom.

U.S. teenage sensation Missy Franklin blistered the field with a remarkable world record in textile to strike a backstroke double for the first time, since Romania's Diana Mocanu did so in 2000. Dominating the race from the start, she threw down a sterling time of 2:04.06 to broaden a full-body length gap over the rest of the field and to slice three-quarters of a second (0.75) off the previous record set by Zimbabwe's Kirsty Coventry in a now-banned polyurethane bodysuit from the 2009 World Championships. Russia's Anastasia Zuyeva cleared a 2:06-barrier to take the silver in 2:05.92, while Franklin's teammate Elizabeth Beisel snatched the bronze in 2:06.55, handing over an entire medal haul for the Americans with a one-three finish.

Backed by a raucous home crowd, Great Britain's Elizabeth Simmonds fell short of the podium with a fourth-place time in 2:07.26. Australia's Meagan Nay finished fifth in 2:07.43, while Coventry, a two-time Olympic champion, missed a chance to produce another historic three-peat as she claimed a distant sixth spot in 2:08.18. France's Alexianne Castel (2:08.43) and Canada's Sinead Russell (2:09.86) closed out the championship field.

== Records ==
Prior to this competition, the existing world and Olympic records were as follows.

World record	Kirsty Coventry (ZIM)	2:04.81	Rome, Italy	1 August 2009
Olympic record	Kirsty Coventry (ZIM)	2:05.24	Beijing, China	16 August 2008

The following records were established during the competition:

Date	Event	Name	Nationality	Time	Record
August 3	Final	Missy Franklin	United States	2:04.06	WR

== Results ==
=== Heats ===
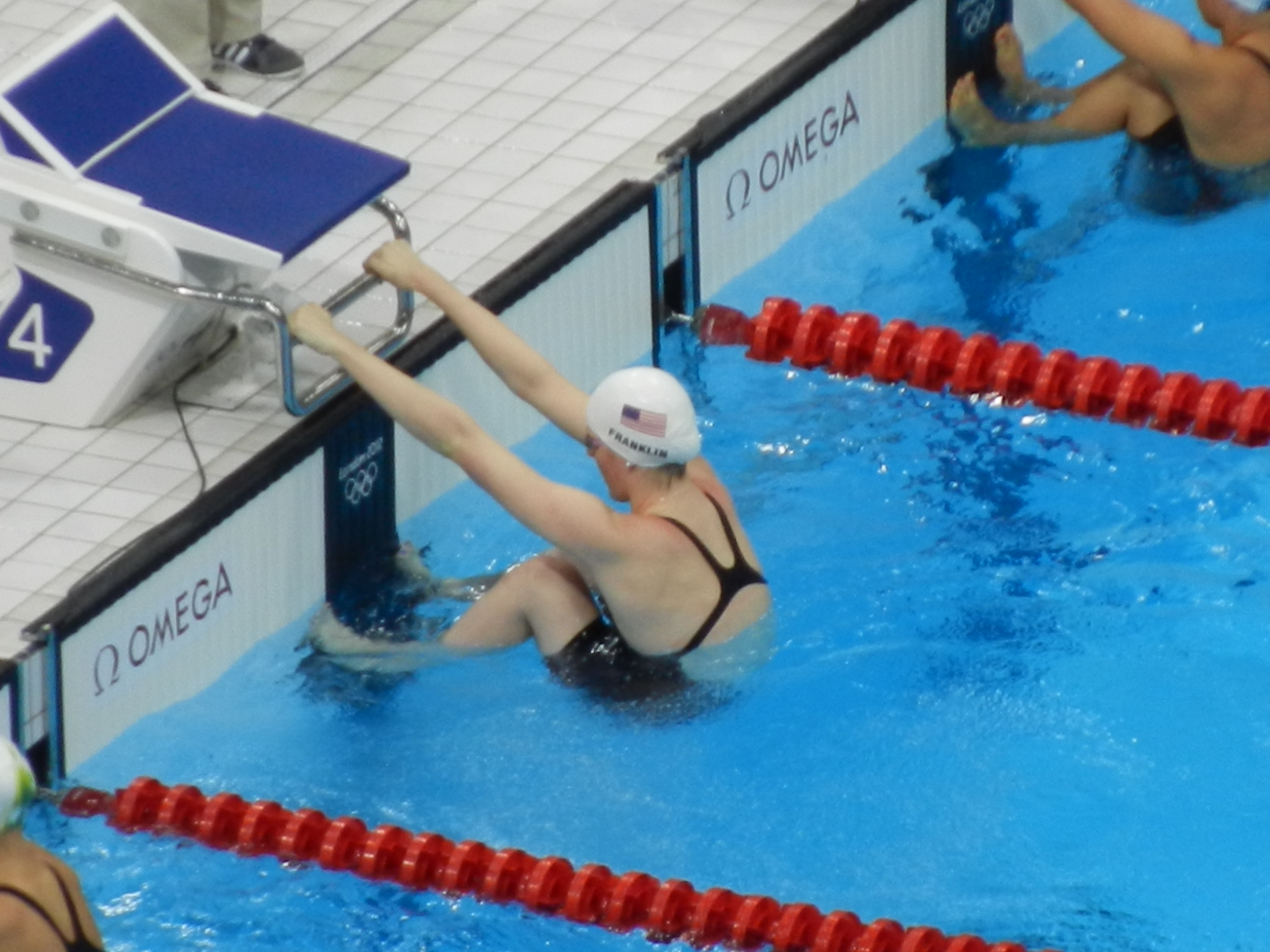
Missy Franklin during the heats

Rank	Heat	Lane	Name	Nationality	Time	Notes
1	5	4	Missy Franklin	United States	2:07.54	Q
2	3	5	Elizabeth Beisel	United States	2:07.82	Q
3	5	2	Kirsty Coventry	Zimbabwe	2:08.14	Q
4	5	5	Meagen Nay	Australia	2:08.40	Q
5	4	4	Belinda Hocking	Australia	2:08.75	Q
6	3	6	Alexianne Castel	France	2:08.92	Q
7	3	3	Sinead Russell	Canada	2:09.04	Q
8	3	4	Anastasia Zuyeva	Russia	2:09.36	Q
9	4	3	Daryna Zevina	Ukraine	2:09.40	Q
10	4	7	Duane da Rocha	Spain	2:09.72	Q
11	5	7	Stephanie Proud	Great Britain	2:10.01	Q
12	2	6	Simona Baumrtová	Czech Republic	2:10.03	Q, NR
13	3	1	Karin Prinsloo	South Africa	2:10.34	Q
14	4	5	Elizabeth Simmonds	Great Britain	2:10.37	Q
15	4	6	Jenny Mensing	Germany	2:10.54	Q
16	5	3	Sharon van Rouwendaal	Netherlands	2:10.60	Q
17	4	1	Melissa Ingram	New Zealand	2:10.63	
18	4	2	Hilary Caldwell	Canada	2:10.75	
19	3	7	Bai Anqi	China	2:11.26	
20	5	8	Eygló Ósk Gústafsdóttir	Iceland	2:11.31	NR
21	2	4	Miyu Otsuka	Japan	2:11.65	
22	5	1	Yao Yige	China	2:12.14	
23	3	2	Alessia Filippi	Italy	2:12.40	
24	2	5	María Fernanda González	Mexico	2:12.75	
25	2	7	Anja Čarman	Slovenia	2:13.01	
26	1	4	Nguyễn Thị Ánh Viên	Vietnam	2:13.35	
27	1	6	Carolina Colorado Henao	Colombia	2:13.64	NR
28	2	2	Mie Nielsen	Denmark	2:13.89	
29	3	8	Alicja Tchórz	Poland	2:14.02	
30	5	6	Laure Manaudou	France	2:14.29	
31	1	2	Ham Chan-mi	South Korea	2:15.30	
32	4	8	Ekaterina Avramova	Bulgaria	2:15.44	
33	2	1	Kim Daniela Pavlin	Croatia	2:15.67	
34	2	3	Melanie Nocher	Ireland	2:16.29	
35	1	3	Dorina Szekeres	Hungary	2:18.16	
36	2	8	Hoi Shun Stephanie Au	Hong Kong	2:18.47	
37	1	5	Yulduz Kuchkarova	Uzbekistan	2:18.60	

=== Semifinals ===
==== Semifinal 1 ====
Rank	Lane	Name	Nationality	Time	Notes
1	4	Elizabeth Beisel	United States	2:06.18	Q
2	5	Meagen Nay	Australia	2:07.42	Q
3	6	Anastasia Zuyeva	Russia	2:07.88	Q
4	3	Alexianne Castel	France	2:08.24	Q
5	1	Elizabeth Simmonds	Great Britain	2:08.48	Q
6	8	Sharon van Rouwendaal	Netherlands	2:09.50	
7	2	Duane da Rocha	Spain	2:09.88	
8	7	Simona Baumrtová	Czech Republic	2:10.18	

==== Semifinal 2 ====
Rank	Lane	Name	Nationality	Time	Notes
1	4	Missy Franklin	United States	2:06.84	Q
2	5	Kirsty Coventry	Zimbabwe	2:08.32	Q
3	6	Sinead Russell	Canada	2:08.76	Q
4	7	Stephanie Proud	Great Britain	2:09.04	
5	3	Belinda Hocking	Australia	2:09.35	
6	2	Daryna Zevina	Ukraine	2:09.70	
7	8	Jenny Mensing	Germany	2:10.68	
8	1	Karin Prinsloo	South Africa	2:11.42	

=== Final ===
Rank	Lane	Name	Nationality	Time	Notes
1st place, gold medalist(s)	5	Missy Franklin	United States	2:04.06	WR
2nd place, silver medalist(s)	6	Anastasia Zuyeva	Russia	2:05.92	
3rd place, bronze medalist(s)	4	Elizabeth Beisel	United States	2:06.55	
4	1	Elizabeth Simmonds	Great Britain	2:07.26	
5	3	Meagen Nay	Australia	2:07.43	
6	7	Kirsty Coventry	Zimbabwe	2:08.18	
7	2	Alexianne Castel	France	2:08.43	
8	8	Sinead Russell	Canada	2:09.86	
