= Swimming at the 2015 World Aquatics Championships – Women's 200 metre backstroke =

Women's 200 metre backstroke at the 2015 World Aquatics Championships
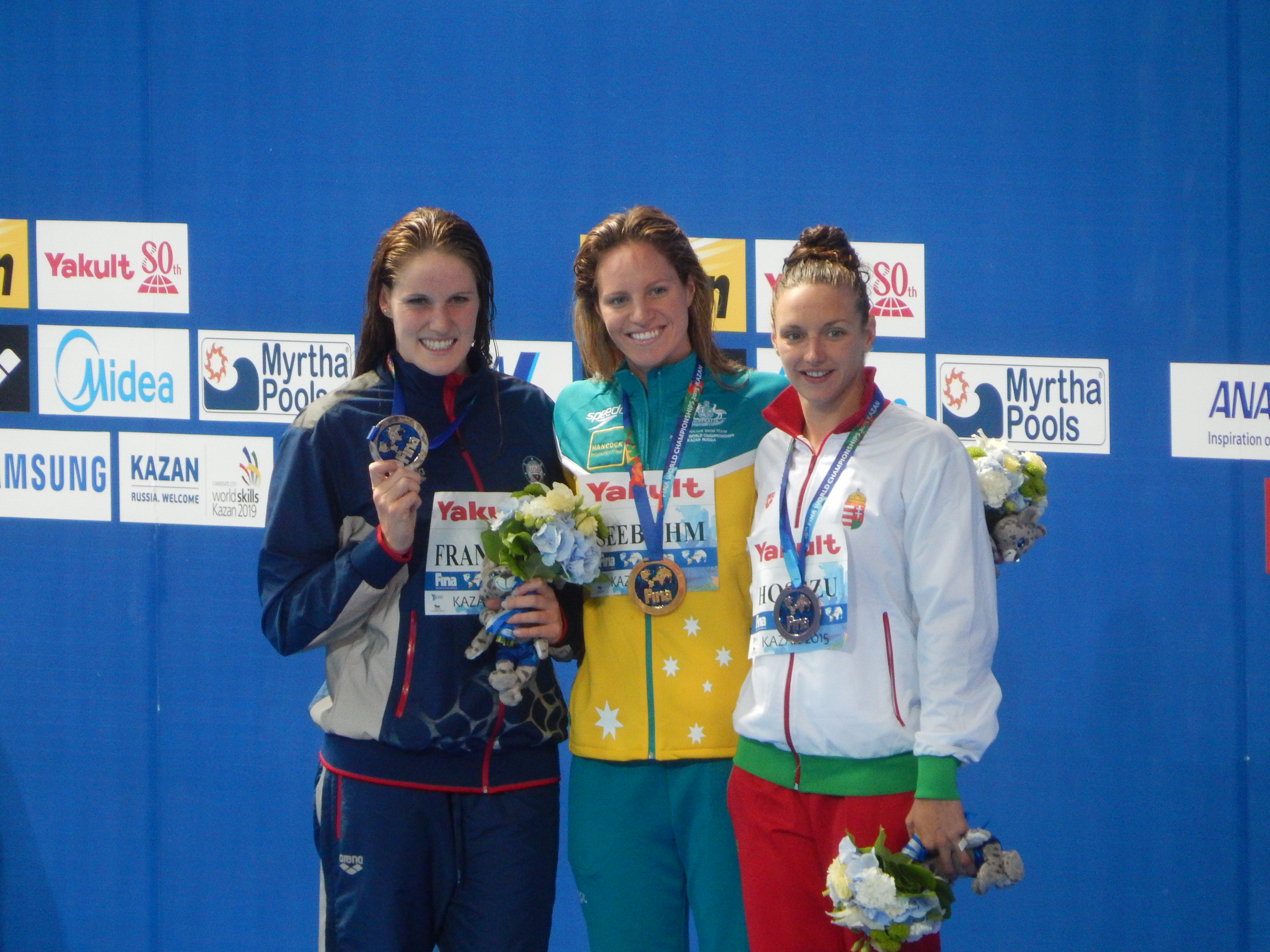
- Victory Ceremony
- Dates: 7 August (heats); 8 August (final)
- Competitors: 44 from 37 nations
- Winning time: 2:05.81

Medalists
gold medal	Emily Seebohm	Australia
silver medal	Missy Franklin	United States
bronze medal	Katinka Hosszú	Hungary

The Women's 200 metre backstroke competition of the swimming events at the 2015 World Aquatics Championships was held on 7 August with the heats and 8 August with the final.

== Records ==
Prior to the competition, the existing world and championship records were as follows.

World record	Missy Franklin (USA)	2:04.06	London, Great Britain	3 August 2012
Competition record	Missy Franklin (USA)	2:04.76	Barcelona, Spain	3 August 2013

== Results ==
=== Heats ===
The heats were held on 7 August at 10:30

Rank	Heat	Lane	Name	Nationality	Time	Notes
1	4	4	Katinka Hosszú	Hungary	2:07.17	Q
2	5	3	Missy Franklin	United States	2:07.84	Q
3	3	3	Dominique Bouchard	Canada	2:08.66	Q
4	3	4	Daria Ustinova	Russia	2:09.16	Q, WJ
4	3	6	Eygló Ósk Gústafsdóttir	Iceland	2:09.16	Q, NR
6	4	3	Jenny Mensing	Germany	2:09.43	Q
7	5	4	Emily Seebohm	Australia	2:09.44	Q
8	3	5	Elizabeth Beisel	United States	2:09.54	Q
9	5	1	Lisa Graf	Germany	2:09.68	Q
10	3	1	Alicja Tchórz	Poland	2:10.04	Q
11	5	7	Kirsty Coventry	Zimbabwe	2:10.38	Q
12	5	2	Margherita Panziera	Italy	2:10.39	Q
13	4	5	Elizabeth Simmonds	Great Britain	2:10.48	Q
14	4	1	Irina Prikhodko	Russia	2:10.81	Q
15	5	6	Hilary Caldwell	Canada	2:10.92	Q
16	4	6	Duane Da Rocha	Spain	2:11.53	Q
17	5	5	Hayley Baker	Australia	2:11.63	
18	3	2	Liu Yaxin	China	2:11.75	
19	4	7	Simona Baumrtová	Czech Republic	2:11.78	
20	5	8	Daryna Zevina	Ukraine	2:12.14	
21	4	0	Joanna Maranhão	Brazil	2:12.26	
22	4	2	Chen Jie	China	2:12.30	
23	5	9	Gisela Morales	Guatemala	2:12.92	
24	4	8	Katalin Burián	Hungary	2:12.96	
25	2	5	Bobbie Gichard	New Zealand	2:13.45	
26	3	8	Matea Samardžić	Croatia	2:14.05	
27	2	3	Claudia Lau	Hong Kong	2:14.51	
28	2	4	Andrea Berrino	Argentina	2:14.96	
29	2	2	Martina van Berkel	Switzerland	2:14.99	
30	4	9	Jördis Steinegger	Austria	2:15.37	
31	3	9	Carolina Colorado Henao	Colombia	2:15.55	
32	2	7	Halime Zülal Zeren	Turkey	2:15.87	
33	2	6	Karin Tomečková	Slovakia	2:16.63	
34	2	0	Zanrè Oberholzer	Namibia	2:18.13	
35	1	5	Karen Vilorio	Honduras	2:18.70	
36	3	0	Lourdes Villaseñor	Mexico	2:19.07	
37	2	1	Tatiana Perstniova	Moldova	2:19.37	
38	2	9	Roxanne Yu	Philippines	2:19.45	
39	2	8	Yessy Yosaputra	Indonesia	2:20.47	
40	1	4	Inés Remersaro	Uruguay	2:20.55	
41	1	3	Kimiko Raheem	FINA Independent Athletes	2:21.18	
42	1	6	Talisa Lanoe	Kenya	2:24.45	
43	1	2	Lauren Hew	Cayman Islands	2:29.52	
44	1	7	Kaya Forson	Ghana	2:43.94	
	3	7	Melani Costa	Spain		DNS
	5	0	Andrea García	Mexico		DNS

=== Semifinals ===
The semifinals were held at 17:49.

==== Semifinal 1 ====
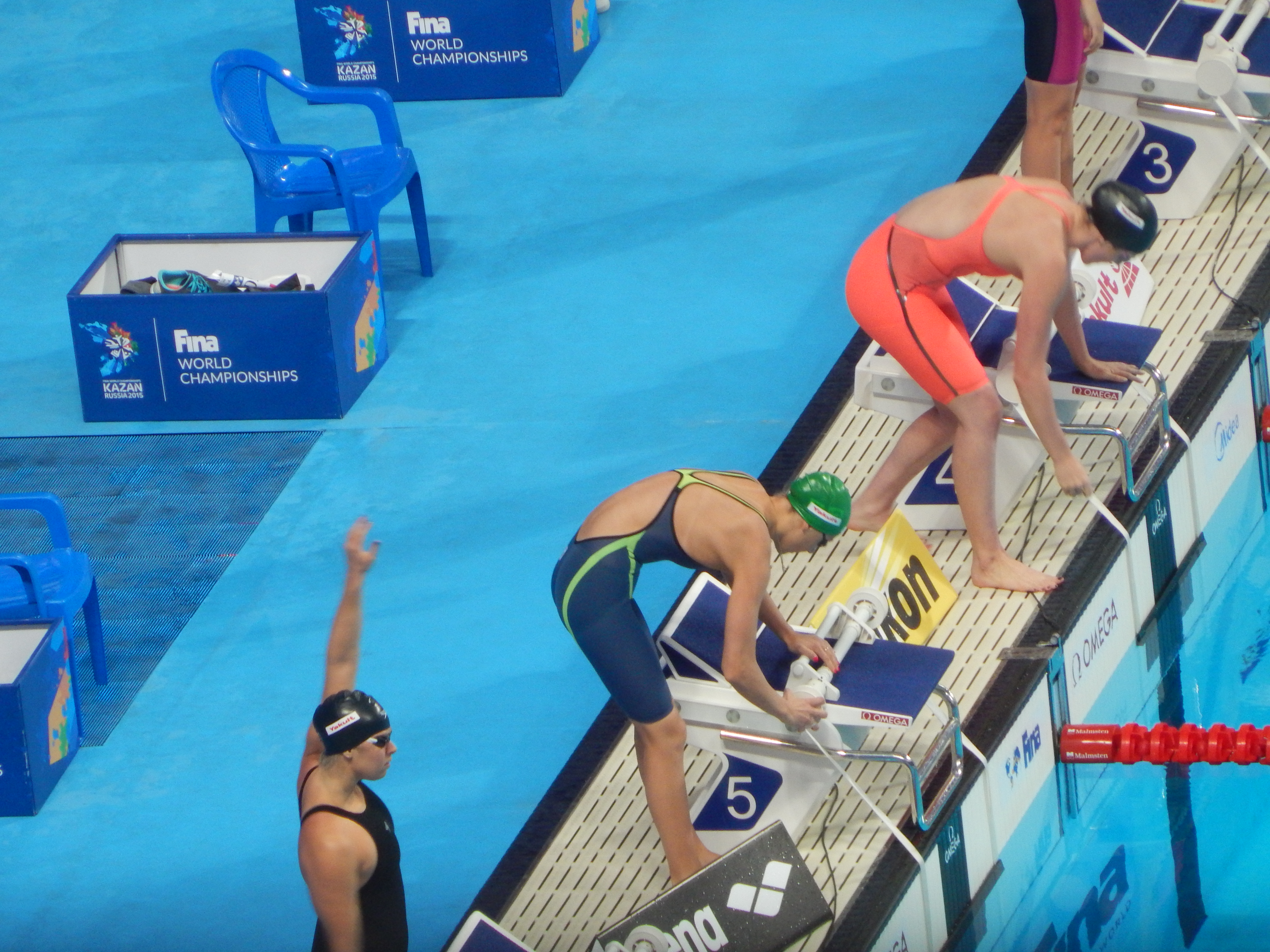
Ustinova and Franklin before first semifinal

Rank	Lane	Name	Nationality	Time	Notes
1	4	Missy Franklin	United States	2:07.79	Q
2	5	Daria Ustinova	Russia	2:08.74	Q, WJ
3	3	Jenny Mensing	Germany	2:09.16	Q
4	7	Margherita Panziera	Italy	2:09.54	
5	1	Irina Prikhodko	Russia	2:10.36	
6	6	Elizabeth Beisel	United States	2:10.68	
7	8	Duane Da Rocha	Spain	2:12.90	
8	2	Alicja Tchórz	Poland	2:14.49	

==== Semifinal 2 ====
Rank	Lane	Name	Nationality	Time	Notes
1	4	Katinka Hosszú	Hungary	2:06.18	Q, NR
2	6	Emily Seebohm	Australia	2:06.56	Q
3	5	Dominique Bouchard	Canada	2:08.16	Q
4	8	Hilary Caldwell	Canada	2:08.99	Q
5	3	Eygló Ósk Gústafsdóttir	Iceland	2:09.04	Q, NR
6	2	Lisa Graf	Germany	2:09.40	
7	1	Elizabeth Simmonds	Great Britain	2:10.57	
8	7	Kirsty Coventry	Zimbabwe	2:10.74	

=== Final ===
The final was held on 8 August at 17:47.

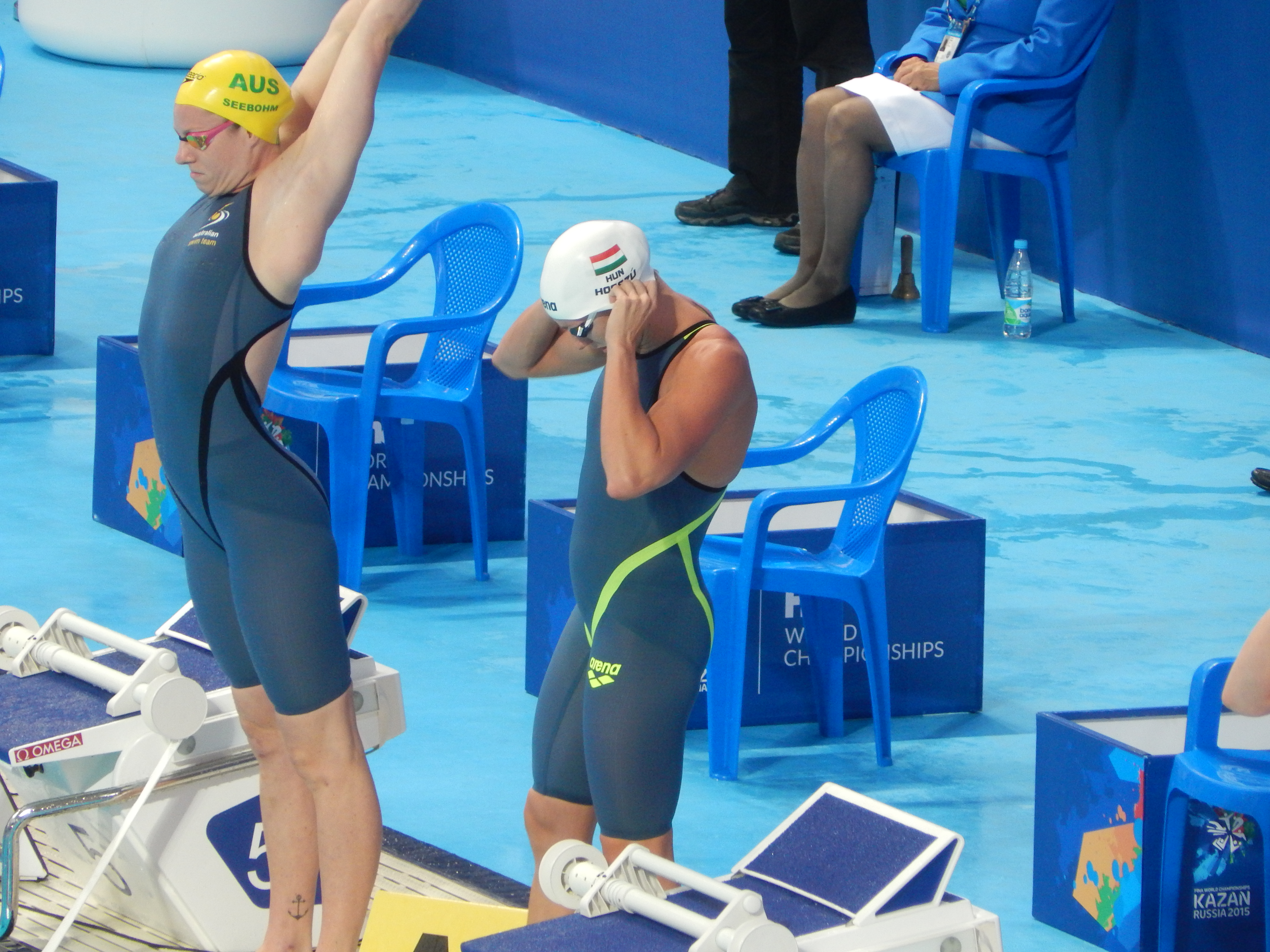
Seebohm and Hosszu before the final

Rank	Lane	Name	Nationality	Time	Notes
1st place, gold medalist(s)	5	Emily Seebohm	Australia	2:05.81	OC
2nd place, silver medalist(s)	3	Missy Franklin	United States	2:06.34	
3rd place, bronze medalist(s)	4	Katinka Hosszú	Hungary	2:06.84	
4	2	Daria Ustinova	Russia	2:07.64	WJ
5	8	Jenny Mensing	Germany	2:08.49	
6	6	Dominique Bouchard	Canada	2:08.51	
7	7	Hilary Caldwell	Canada	2:08.66	
8	1	Eygló Ósk Gústafsdóttir	Iceland	2:09.53	
