= 2012 FINA World Swimming Championships (25 m) – Women's 200 metre backstroke =

Women's 200m Backstroke at the 2012 Short Course Worlds
- Dates: 14 December (heats and final)
- Winning time: 2:02.24

Medalists
gold medal	Daryna Zevina	Ukraine
silver medal	Bonnie Brandon	United States
bronze medal	Duane Da Rocha	Spain

The women's 200 metre backstroke event at the 11th FINA World Swimming Championships (25m) took place 14 December 2012 at the Sinan Erdem Dome.

== Records ==
Prior to this competition, the existing world and championship records were as follows.

	Name	Nation	Time	Location	Date
World record	Missy Franklin	United States	2:00.03	Berlin	22 October 2011
Championship record	Kirsty Coventry	Zimbabwe	2:00.91	Manchester	11 April 2008

No new records were set during this competition.

== Results ==
=== Heats ===
Rank	Heat	Lane	Name	Time	Notes
1	4	4	Daryna Zevina (UKR)	2:03.41	Q
2	5	7	Bonnie Brando (USA)	2:04.45	Q
3	5	3	Anja Čarman (SLO)	2:04.95	Q
4	4	3	Marie Kamimura (JPN)	2:04.96	Q
5	5	5	Duane Da Rocha (ESP)	2:05.18	Q
6	3	5	Melissa Ingram (NZL)	2:05.20	Q
7	4	5	Simona Baumrtová (CZE)	2:05.38	Q
8	5	4	Elizabeth Simmonds (GBR)	2:05.65	Q
9	3	2	Evelyn Verrasztó (HUN)	2:05.83	
10	3	6	Bai Anqi (CHN)	2:06.63	
11	4	6	Fernanda González (MEX)	2:07.23	
12	4	8	Yao Yige (CHN)	2:07.41	
13	5	2	Jenny Mensing (GER)	2:07.59	
14	4	2	Ellen Fullerton (AUS)	2:08.37	
15	3	4	Sharon van Rouwendaal (NED)	2:08.51	
16	5	6	Polina Lapshina (RUS)	2:09.11	
17	3	1	Carolina Colorado Henao (COL)	2:09.82	NR
18	5	9	Martina van Berkel (SUI)	2:10.46	
19	5	0	Jessica Ashley-Cooper (RSA)	2:10.52	
20	3	3	Georgia Hohmann (GBR)	2:10.64	
21	2	2	Ranohon Amanova (UZB)	2:11.14	
22	4	9	Jördis Steinegger (AUT)	2:11.16	
23	5	1	Sandra Hafström (SWE)	2:11.35	
24	3	8	Nguyen Thi Anh Vien (VIE)	2:12.92	
25	3	9	Sarah Rolko (LUX)	2:13.04	
26	2	5	Hazal Sarıkaya (TUR)	2:13.17	
27	4	7	Ida Lindborg (SWE)	2:13.83	
28	1	2	Yekaterina Rudenko (KAZ)	2:13.87	
29	4	0	Halime Zulal Zeren (TUR)	2:14.48	
30	2	3	Tatiana Perstniova (MDA)	2:15.67	NR
31	3	0	Agata Magner (POL)	2:16.53	
32	2	6	Inés Remersaro (URU)	2:17.67	NR
33	2	4	Yessy Yosaputra (INA)	2:17.87	
34	2	1	Araya Wongvat (THA)	2:20.06	
35	2	8	Vong Erica Man Wai (MAC)	2:20.45	
36	2	9	Lanoe Talisa Erwan (KEN)	2:22.36	NR
37	2	7	Mónica Ramírez (AND)	2:24.28	
38	1	4	Kuan Weng I (MAC)	2:27.18	
39	2	0	Kimiko Shihara Raheem (SRI)	2:27.51	
40	1	3	Estellah Fils Rabetsara (MAD)	2:32.27	
41	1	5	Field Anita Zahra (KEN)	2:36.27	
	1	6	Andreina Pinto (VEN)	DNS	
	1	7	Erika Torrellas (VEN)	DNS	
	3	7	Megan Romano (USA)	DNS	
	4	1	Alicja Tchórz (POL)	DNS	
	5	8	Karin Prinsloo (RSA)	DNS	

=== Final ===
The final was held at 19:23.

Rank	Lane	Name	Nationality	Time	Notes
1st place, gold medalist(s)	4	Daryna Zevina	Ukraine	2:02.24	
2nd place, silver medalist(s)	5	Bonnie Brandon	United States	2:03.19	
3rd place, bronze medalist(s)	2	Duane Da Rocha	Spain	2:04.15	
4	6	Marie Kamimura	Japan	2:04.22	
5	8	Elizabeth Simmonds	Great Britain	2:04.55	
6	7	Melissa Ingram	New Zealand	2:05.45	
7	1	Simona Baumrtová	Czech Republic	2:05.49	
8	3	Anja Čarman	Slovenia	2:05.62	
