= Swimming at the 2016 Summer Olympics – Women's 200 metre backstroke =

Women's 200 metre backstroke at the Games of the XXXI Olympiad
- Venue: Olympic Aquatics Stadium
- Dates: 11 August 2016 (heats & semifinals); 12 August 2016 (final)
- Competitors: 28 from 20 nations
- Winning time: 2:05.99

Medalists
1st place, gold medalist(s)		Maya DiRado	United States
2nd place, silver medalist(s)		Katinka Hosszú	Hungary
3rd place, bronze medalist(s)		Hilary Caldwell	Canada

The women's 200 metre backstroke event at the 2016 Summer Olympics took place on 11–12 August at the Olympic Aquatics Stadium.

== Summary ==
U.S. swimmer Maya DiRado saved her best race for last before retiring from the sport, as she upset Hungary's Katinka Hosszú on the home stretch to claim the distance backstroke title. Coming from behind at the 150-metre turn, DiRado produced a late surge to touch out the Hungarian favorite by six hundredths of a second for the gold medal in 2:05.99. Hosszú commanded a solid lead through the first half of the race, but she was unable to hold off DiRado about the midway of the final lap, leaving with a silver in 2:06.05. Meanwhile, Canada's Hilary Caldwell swam her way into the bronze-medal position with a 2:07.54.

Russia's Daria Ustinova, who was allowed to compete in Rio after successfully appealing from her doping ban, obtained the fourth spot in 2:07.89, edging out Australia's Belinda Hocking (2:08.02) to fifth by 0.13 of a second. Zimbabwe's Kirsty Coventry, a five-time Olympian and double gold medalist in this event, capped off her illustrious Olympic career with a sixth-place finish in 2:08.80. Chinese teenager Liu Yaxin (2:09.03) and Iceland's Eygló Ósk Gústafsdóttir (2:09.44) rounded out the top eight.

World-record holder Missy Franklin missed the opportunity to defend her Olympic title in the final, after placing fourteenth in the semifinals (2:09.74). Other notable swimmers failed to reach the top eight roster, including Hocking's teammate and reigning world champion Emily Seebohm, London 2012 silver medalist Anastasia Fesikova of Russia, and Ukraine's Daryna Zevina, runner-up at the European Championships two months earlier.

== Records ==
Prior to this competition, the existing world and Olympic records were as follows.

World record	Missy Franklin (USA)	2:04.06	London, United Kingdom	3 August 2012
Olympic record	Missy Franklin (USA)	2:04.06	London, United Kingdom	3 August 2012

== Competition format ==
The competition consisted of three rounds: heats, semifinals, and a final. The swimmers with the best 16 times in the heats advanced to the semifinals. The swimmers with the best 8 times in the semifinals advanced to the final. Swim-offs were used as necessary to break ties for advancement to the next round.

== Results ==
=== Heats ===
Rank	Heat	Lane	Name	Nationality	Time	Notes
1	3	4	Katinka Hosszú	Hungary	2:06.09	Q, NR
2	3	3	Hilary Caldwell	Canada	2:07.40	Q
3	3	5	Maya DiRado	United States	2:08.60	Q
4	2	6	Lisa Graf	Germany	2:08.67	Q
4	4	5	Belinda Hocking	Australia	2:08.67	Q
6	3	7	Liu Yaxin	China	2:08.84	Q
7	2	3	Dominique Bouchard	Canada	2:08.87	Q
8	4	3	Daryna Zevina	Ukraine	2:08.88	Q
9	3	2	Kirsty Coventry	Zimbabwe	2:08.91	Q
10	4	4	Emily Seebohm	Australia	2:09.00	Q
11	2	4	Missy Franklin	United States	2:09.36	Q
12	4	2	Eygló Ósk Gústafsdóttir	Iceland	2:09.62	Q
13	2	5	Daria Ustinova	Russia	2:09.96	Q
14	3	6	Anastasia Fesikova	Russia	2:10.39	Q
15	2	2	Matea Samardžić	Croatia	2:10.51	Q
16	4	6	Jenny Mensing	Germany	2:10.68	Q
17	2	7	Margherita Panziera	Italy	2:10.92	
18	4	7	Claudia Lau	Hong Kong	2:10.94	
19	2	1	Duane da Rocha	Spain	2:11.17	
20	2	8	Alicja Tchórz	Poland	2:11.40	
21	1	5	Ekaterina Avramova	Turkey	2:12.98	
22	3	1	Réka György	Hungary	2:12.99	
23	1	4	Simona Baumrtova	Czech Republic	2:13.26	
24	1	3	Martina van Berkel	Switzerland	2:13.46	
25	4	8	África Zamorano	Spain	2:13.74	
26	3	8	Natsumi Sakai	Japan	2:13.99	
27	4	1	Chen Jie	China	2:14.18	
28	1	6	Yessy Yosaputra	Indonesia	2:20.88	

=== Semifinals ===
==== Semifinal 1 ====
Rank	Lane	Name	Nationality	Time	Notes
1	4	Hilary Caldwell	Canada	2:07.17	Q
2	3	Liu Yaxin	China	2:07.56	Q
3	7	Eygló Ósk Gústafsdóttir	Iceland	2:08.84	Q, NR
4	6	Daryna Zevina	Ukraine	2:09.07	
5	1	Anastasia Fesikova	Russia	2:09.12	
6	2	Emily Seebohm	Australia	2:09.39	
7	5	Lisa Graf	Germany	2:09.56	
8	8	Jenny Mensing	Germany	2:10.15	

==== Semifinal 2 ====
Rank	Lane	Name	Nationality	Time	Notes
1	4	Katinka Hosszú	Hungary	2:06.03	Q, NR
2	5	Maya DiRado	United States	2:07.53	Q
3	3	Belinda Hocking	Australia	2:07.83	Q
4	2	Kirsty Coventry	Zimbabwe	2:08.83	Q
5	1	Daria Ustinova	Russia	2:08.84	Q
6	6	Dominique Bouchard	Canada	2:09.07	
7	7	Missy Franklin	United States	2:09.74	
8	8	Matea Samardžić	Croatia	2:09.83	

=== Final ===
Rank	Lane	Name	Nationality	Time	Notes
1st place, gold medalist(s)	3	Maya DiRado	United States	2:05.99	
2nd place, silver medalist(s)	4	Katinka Hosszú	Hungary	2:06.05	
3rd place, bronze medalist(s)	5	Hilary Caldwell	Canada	2:07.54	
4	8	Daria Ustinova	Russia	2:07.89	
5	2	Belinda Hocking	Australia	2:08.02	
6	7	Kirsty Coventry	Zimbabwe	2:08.80	
7	6	Liu Yaxin	China	2:09.03	
8	1	Eygló Ósk Gústafsdóttir	Iceland	2:09.44	
