= Swimming at the 2012 European Aquatics Championships – Women's 200 metre backstroke =

Women's 200 metre backstroke at the 2012 European Aquatics Championships
- Dates: May 21, 2012 (heats and semifinals); May 22, 2012 (final)
- Competitors: 29 from 22 nations
- Winning time: 2:08.41

Medalists
gold medal	Alexianne Castel	France
silver medal	Jenny Mensing	Germany
bronze medal	Duane Da Rocha Marce	Spain

The women's 200 metre backstroke competition of the swimming events at the 2012 European Aquatics Championships took place May 21 and 22. The heats and semifinals took place on May 21, the final on May 22.

== Records ==
Prior to the competition, the existing world, European and championship records were as follows.

	Name	Nation	Time	Location	Date
World record	Kirsty Coventry	Zimbabwe	2:04.81	Rome	August 1, 2009
European record	Anastasia Zuyeva	Russia	2:04.94	Rome	August 1, 2009
Championship record	Krisztina Egerszegi	Hungary	2:06.62	Athens	August 22, 1991

== Results ==
=== Heats ===
29 swimmers participated in 4 heats.

Rank	Heat	Lane	Name	Nationality	Time	Notes
1	3	4	Alexianne Castel	France	2:10.04	Q
2	3	5	Jenny Mensing	Germany	2:11.05	Q
3	4	4	Daryna Zevina	Ukraine	2:11.31	Q
4	4	6	Anja Čarman	Slovenia	2:12.55	Q
5	2	3	Simona Baumrtová	Czech Republic	2:12.66	Q
6	4	5	Duane da Rocha Marce	Spain	2:12.73	Q
7	2	4	Alessia Filippi	Italy	2:12.89	Q
8	3	6	Melanie Nocher	Ireland	2:13.09	Q
9	3	3	Alicja Tchórz	Poland	2:13.40	Q
10	3	2	Kira Toussaint	Netherlands	2:13.67	Q
11	2	5	Eygló Ósk Gústafsdóttir	Iceland	2:13.81	Q, NR
12	2	6	Marie Jugnet	France	2:14.14	Q
13	2	1	Kim Daniela Pavlin	Croatia	2:14.25	Q
14	3	1	Uschi Halbreiner	Austria	2:14.40	Q, NR
15	4	2	Annemarie Worst	Netherlands	2:14.82	Q
16	4	1	Klaudia Nazieblo	Poland	2:15.72	Q
17	2	7	Dorina Szekeres	Hungary	2:16.67	
18	3	8	Eszter Povázsay	Hungary	2:17.05	
19	4	3	Ekaterina Avramova	Bulgaria	2:17.11	
20	1	4	Martina van Berkel	Switzerland	2:17.94	
21	3	7	Camille Gheorghiu	France	2:18.08	
22	4	7	Anna Volchkov	Israel	2:18.18	
23	2	2	Therese Svendsen	Sweden	2:18.28	
24	1	6	Veronica Orheim Bjørlykke	Norway	2:19.37	
25	1	3	Alzbeta Rehorkova	Czech Republic	2:19.47	
26	2	8	Boglárka Kapás	Hungary	2:19.56	
27	1	5	Karin Tomecková	Slovakia	2:21.37	
28	4	8	Hazal Sarikaya	Turkey	2:22.28	
29	1	2	Monica Ramirez Abella	Andorra	2:24.65	

=== Semifinals ===
The eight fastest swimmers advanced to the final.

==== Semifinal 1 ====
Rank	Lane	Name	Nationality	Time	Notes
1	4	Jenny Mensing	Germany	2:09.49	Q
2	6	Melanie Nocher	Ireland	2:11.68	Q
3	3	Duane da Rocha Marce	Spain	2:11.86	Q
4	5	Anja Čarman	Slovenia	2:12.10	Q
5	2	Kira Toussaint	Netherlands	2:13.09	
6	7	Marie Jugnet	France	2:14.41	
7	8	Klaudia Nazieblo	Poland	2:17.22	
8	1	Uschi Halbreiner	Austria	2:17.77	

==== Semifinal 2 ====
Rank	Lane	Name	Nationality	Time	Notes
1	4	Alexianne Castel	France	2:09.03	Q
2	5	Daryna Zevina	Ukraine	2:10.17	Q
3	6	Alessia Filippi	Italy	2:10.89	Q
4	3	Simona Baumrtová	Czech Republic	2:11.20	Q
5	1	Kim Daniela Pavlin	Croatia	2:12.79	
6	7	Eygló Ósk Gústafsdóttir	Iceland	2:13.77	NR
7	8	Annemarie Worst	Netherlands	2:13.92	
8	2	Alicja Tchórz	Poland	2:13.95	

=== Final ===
The final was held at 17:58.

Rank	Lane	Name	Nationality	Time	Notes
1st place, gold medalist(s)	4	Alexianne Castel	France	2:08.41	
2nd place, silver medalist(s)	5	Jenny Mensing	Germany	2:09.55	
3rd place, bronze medalist(s)	1	Duane Da Rocha Marce	Spain	2:09.56	
4	3	Daryna Zevina	Ukraine	2:09.57	
5	7	Melanie Nocher	Ireland	2:10.75	NR
6	2	Simona Baumrtová	Czech Republic	2:10.85	
7	6	Alessia Filippi	Italy	2:11.20	
8	8	Anja Čarman	Slovenia	2:12.51	
