= 2010 FINA World Swimming Championships (25 m) – Women's 100 metre backstroke =

Women's 100m Backstroke at the 2010 Short Course Worlds
- Dates: 15 December 2010 (heats and semifinals); 16 December 2010 (final)
- Competitors: 61
- Winning time: 56.08

Medalists
gold medal	Natalie Coughlin	United States
silver medal	Zhao Jing	China
bronze medal	Gao Chang	China

The Women's 100 Backstroke event at the 10th FINA World Swimming Championships (25m) took place 15 – 16 December in Dubai, United Arab Emirates. The heats and semifinals were 15 December; the final was 16 December.

61 swimmers swam the event.

== Records ==
Prior to the competition, the existing world and championship records were as follows.

	Name	Nation	Time	Location	Date
World record	Shiho Sakai	Japan	55.23	Berlin	15 November 2009
Championship record	Kirsty Coventry	Zimbabwe	57.10	Manchester	10 April 2008

The following records were established during the competition:

Date	Round	Name	Nation	Time	WR	CR
15 December 2010	Semifinals	Gao Chang	China	56.58		CR
16 December 2010	Final	Natalie Coughlin	United States	56.08		CR

== Results ==
=== Heats ===
Rank	Heat	Lane	Name	Time	Notes
1	7	1	Missy Franklin (USA)	57.33	Q
2	8	6	Rachel Goh (AUS)	57.54	Q
3	8	4	Gao Chang (CHN)	57.56	Q
4	7	6	Marieke Guehrer (AUS)	57.78	Q
5	7	7	Natalie Coughlin (USA)	57.91	Q
6	1	2	Zhao Jing (CHN)	58.17	Q
7	7	5	Daryna Zevina (UKR)	58.37	Q
8	6	4	Aleksandra Gerasimenya (BLR)	58.41	Q
9	8	5	Anastasia Zuyeva (RUS)	58.48	Q
10	8	2	Alexianne Castel (FRA)	58.51	Q
11	6	3	Sharon van Rouwendaal (NED)	58.62	Q
12	6	2	Fabíola Molina (BRA)	58.88	Q
13	7	8	Chanelle Van Wyk (RSA)	58.89	Q
14	7	3	Mercedes Peris (ESP)	58.90	Q
15	7	4	Kseniya Moskvina (RUS)	58.96	Q
16	7	2	Simona Baumrtová (CZE)	59.13	Q
17	6	5	Elena Gemo (ITA)	59.24	
18	8	7	Sarah Sjöström (SWE)	59.26	
19	6	1	Sinead Russell (CAN)	59.31	
20	4	4	Fernanda González (MEX)	59.39	
21	6	6	Miyuki Takemura (JPN)	59.55	
22	6	8	Michelle Coleman (SWE)	59.73	
23	7	8	Ekaterina Avramova (BUL)	59.82	
24	5	2	Leone Vorster (RSA)	1:00.09	
25	5	8	Laura Letrari (ITA)	1:00.13	
26	1	6	Theodora Drakou (GRE)	1:00.28	
27	8	1	Ingvild Snildal (NOR)	1:00.47	
28	8	3	Pernille Jessing Larsen (DEN)	1:00.60	
29	6	7	Sophia Batchelor (NZL)	1:00.66	
30	5	4	Etiene Medeiros (BRA)	1:00.78	
31	5	5	Hanna-Maria Seppälä (FIN)	1:00.80	
32	5	1	Sanja Jovanovic (CRO)	1:00.95	
33	4	5	Alana Kathryn Dillette (BAH)	1:01.33	
34	5	6	Katarina Milly (SVK)	1:01.36	
35	5	3	Hazal Sarikaya (TUR)	1:01.49	
36	4	1	Yulduz Kuchkarova (UZB)	1:01.91	
37	4	3	Kätlin Sepp (EST)	1:01.92	
38	4	2	Sarah Rolko (LUX)	1:02.00	
39	4	8	Jeserik Pinto (VEN)	1:02.09	
40	5	7	Cecilia Bertoncello (ARG)	1:02.11	
41	4	7	Chen Ting (TPE)	1:02.33	
42	4	6	Isabella Arcila (COL)	1:02.46	
43	3	3	Massie Milagros Carrillo (PER)	1:03.78	
44	3	2	Elimar Barrios (VEN)	1:04.15	
45	3	4	Monica Ramirez (AND)	1:04.45	
46	2	3	Lara Butler (CAY)	1:04.77	
47	3	6	Kirsten Ann Lapham (ZIM)	1:05.23	
48	2	4	Nicola Muscat (MLT)	1:05.54	
49	2	2	Karen Torrez (BOL)	1:05.66	NR
50	3	7	Carolina Alejandra Aguilar (PER)	1:06.26	
51	2	5	Karen Vilorio (HON)	1:06.58	
52	3	5	Iulia Olari (MDA)	1:06.61	
53	2	6	Jade Howard (ZAM)	1:06.91	
54	3	8	Vong Erica Man Wai (MAC)	1:07.40	
55	3	1	Sara Hyajna (JOR)	1:08.51	
56	2	7	Talisa Lanoe (KEN)	1:08.90	
57	2	8	Estellah Fils Rabetsara (MAD)	1:11.59	
58	2	1	Cheyenne Rova (FIJ)	1:13.20	
59	1	5	Osisang Chilton (PLW)	1:16.48	
60	1	4	Shaila Rana (NEP)	1:21.82	
61	1	3	Keanna Villagomez (NMI)	1:22.99	

=== Semifinals ===
Semifinal 1

Rank	Lane	Name	Time	Notes
1	5	Natalie Coughlin (USA)	57.61	Q
2	4	Rachel Goh (AUS)	57.76	Q
3	6	Anastasia Zuyeva (RUS)	57.79	Q
4	3	Daryna Zevina (UKR)	58.58	
5	2	Sharon van Rouwendaal (NED)	58.69	
6	7	Chanelle Van Wyk (RSA)	58.84	
7	1	Kseniya Moskvina (RUS)	58.91	
8	8	Elena Gemo (ITA)	59.05	

Semifinal 2

Rank	Lane	Name	Time	Notes
1	5	Gao Chang (CHN)	56.58	Q, CR
2	4	Missy Franklin (USA)	57.49	Q
3	3	Zhao Jing (CHN)	57.54	Q
4	6	Aleksandra Gerasimenya (BLR)	58.03	Q
5	1	Mercedes Peris (ESP)	58.31	Q
6	2	Alexianne Castel (FRA)	58.49	
7	7	Fabíola Molina (BRA)	58.63	
8	8	Simona Baumrtová (CZE)	59.24	

=== Final ===
Rank	Lane	Name	Time	Notes
1st place, gold medalist(s)	6	Natalie Coughlin (USA)	56.08	CR
2nd place, silver medalist(s)	3	Zhao Jing (CHN)	56.18	
3rd place, bronze medalist(s)	4	Gao Chang (CHN)	56.21	
4	5	Missy Franklin (USA)	56.92	
5	2	Rachel Goh (AUS)	57.36	
6	7	Anastasia Zuyeva (RUS)	57.67	
7	8	Mercedes Peris (ESP)	57.87	
8	1	Aleksandra Gerasimenya (BLR)	58.48	
