= 2014 FINA World Swimming Championships (25 m) – Women's 200 metre backstroke =

Women's 200 metre backstroke at the 2014 FINA World Swimming Championships (25 m)
- Dates: 5 December
- Competitors: 48 from 37 nations
- Winning time: 1:59.23

Medalists
gold medal	Katinka Hosszú	Hungary
silver medal	Emily Seebohm	Australia
bronze medal	Sayaka Akase	Japan

The Women's 200 metre backstroke competition of the 2014 FINA World Swimming Championships (25 m) was held on 5 December.

== Records ==
Prior to the competition, the existing world and championship records were as follows.

	Name	Nation	Time	Location	Date
World record	Melissa Franklin	United States	2:00.03	Berlin	22 October 2011
Championship record	Kirsty Coventry	Zimbabwe	2:00.91	Manchester	11 April 2008

The following records were established during the competition:

Date	Event	Name	Nation	Time	Record
5 December	Final	Katinka Hosszú	Hungary	1:59.23	WR, CR

== Results ==
=== Heats ===
The heats were held at 10:01.

Rank	Heat	Lane	Name	Nationality	Time	Notes
1	5	4	Katinka Hosszú	Hungary	2:02.69	Q
2	6	4	Daryna Zevina	Ukraine	2:03.18	Q
3	4	4	Madison Wilson	Australia	2:03.39	Q
4	5	5	Sayaka Akase	Japan	2:03.40	Q
5	5	2	Hilary Caldwell	Canada	2:03.44	Q
6	6	5	Emily Seebohm	Australia	2:03.49	Q
7	5	6	Elizabeth Beisel	United States	2:03.66	Q
8	4	5	Simona Baumrtová	Czech Republic	2:03.95	Q
9	6	2	Daria Ustinova	Russia	2:04.38	
10	6	6	Eygló Ósk Gústafsdóttir	Iceland	2:04.97	
11	5	3	Kathleen Baker	United States	2:04.99	
12	4	9	Yao Yige	China	2:05.00	
13	4	8	Andrea Berrino	Argentina	2:05.06	SA
14	4	3	Jenny Mensing	Germany	2:05.47	
15	6	7	Genevieve Cantin	Canada	2:05.61	
16	6	3	Federica Pellegrini	Italy	2:05.76	
17	6	1	Michelle Coleman	Sweden	2:05.82	
18	4	6	Duane Da Rocha	Spain	2:05.94	
19	6	8	Rena Nishiwaki	Japan	2:06.89	
20	6	0	Jördis Steinegger	Austria	2:07.54	
21	5	7	Anastasiia Osipenko	Russia	2:07.58	
22	5	8	Sarah Bro	Denmark	2:07.98	
23	4	7	Carolina Colorado Henao	Colombia	2:08.44	
24	4	0	Alicja Tchórz	Poland	2:08.63	
25	3	5	Chen Jie	China	2:08.89	
26	6	9	Martina van Berkel	Switzerland	2:09.26	
37	3	6	Stephanie Au	Hong Kong	2:09.36	
38	3	1	Ekaterina Avramova	Turkey	2:09.39	
29	5	0	Ida Lindborg	Sweden	2:10.36	
30	2	7	Nguyễn Thị Ánh Viên	Vietnam	2:10.52	
31	3	7	Zanre Oberholzer	Namibia	2:10.95	
32	3	2	Ranohon Amanova	Uzbekistan	2:11.32	
33	5	9	Tereza Grusová	Czech Republic	2:13.27	
34	3	4	Karolina Hájková	Slovakia	2:13.51	
35	5	1	Ambra Esposito	Italy	2:14.07	
36	3	0	Inés Remersaro	Uruguay	2:14.22	
37	3	3	Florencia Perotti	Argentina	2:14.34	
38	2	5	Roxanne Yu	Philippines	2:14.72	
39	3	8	Tatiana Perstniova	Moldova	2:16.48	
40	3	9	Alexus Laird	Seychelles	2:18.20	
41	2	4	Talisa Tanoe	Kenya	2:19.55	
42	2	3	Ariana Herranz	Philippines	2:23.94	
43	2	2	Deandre Small	Barbados	2:24.22	
44	2	6	Lauren Hew	Cayman Islands	2:24.38	
45	2	1	Yuliya Stisyuk	Azerbaijan	2:27.49	
46	2	8	Diana Basho	Albania	2:38.82	
47	1	5	Roylin Akiwo	Palau	2:52.55	
—	1	4	Shanice Paraka	Papua New Guinea		DNS
—	4	1	Evelyn Verrasztó	Hungary		DNS
—	4	2	Dorte Baumert	Germany		DNS
—	1	3	Tanja Kylliainen	Finland		DSQ

=== Final ===
The final were held at 18:32.

Rank	Lane	Name	Nationality	Time	Notes
1st place, gold medalist(s)	4	Katinka Hosszú	Hungary	1:59.23	WR
2nd place, silver medalist(s)	7	Emily Seebohm	Australia	2:00.13	OC
3rd place, bronze medalist(s)	6	Sayaka Akase	Japan	2:02.30	
4	5	Daryna Zevina	Ukraine	2:02.44	
5	3	Madison Wilson	Australia	2:02.67	
6	2	Hilary Caldwell	Canada	2:03.06	
7	1	Elizabeth Beisel	United States	2:04.22	
8	8	Simona Baumrtová	Czech Republic	2:04.24	
