= Swimming at the 2014 European Aquatics Championships – Women's 200 metre backstroke =

Women's 200 metre backstroke at the Swimming at the 2014 European Aquatics Championships
- Dates: 18–19 August
- Competitors: 25 from 18 nations
- Winning time: 2:09.37

Medalists
gold medal	Duane Da Rocha	Spain
silver medal	Elizabeth Simmonds	Great Britain
bronze medal	Daria Ustinova	Russia

The Women's 200 metre backstroke competition of the 2014 European Aquatics Championships was held on 18–19 August.

== Records ==
Prior to the competition, the existing world, European and championship records were as follows.

	Name	Nation	Time	Location	Date
World record	Missy Franklin	United States	2:04.06	London	28 July 2012
European record	Anastasia Zuyeva	Russia	2:04.94	Rome	1 August 2009
Championship record	Krisztina Egerszegi	Hungary	2:06.62	Athens	22 August 1991

== Results ==
=== Heats ===
The heats were held at 11:02.

Rank	Heat	Lane	Name	Nationality	Time	Notes
1	2	5	Jenny Mensing	Germany	2:10.33	Q
2	2	6	Duane Da Rocha	Spain	2:10.34	Q
3	2	3	Lisa Graf	Germany	2:10.75	Q
4	3	5	Katinka Hosszú	Hungary	2:11.09	Q
5	1	6	Melani Costa	Spain	2:11.63	Q
6	1	3	Carlotta Zofkova	Italy	2:11.74	Q
7	1	5	Simona Baumrtová	Czech Republic	2:11.88	Q
8	1	4	Elizabeth Simmonds	Great Britain	2:12.32	Q
9	3	6	Sonnele Öztürk	Germany	2:13.15	
10	3	4	Daria Ustinova	Russia	2:13.93	Q
11	3	3	Alicja Tchórz	Poland	2:14.51	Q
12	2	4	Daryna Zevina	Ukraine	2:14.79	Q
13	3	2	Jördis Steinegger	Austria	2:15.14	Q
14	2	2	Klaudia Nazieblo	Poland	2:15.69	Q
15	1	7	Matea Samardžić	Croatia	2:15.80	Q
16	2	7	Ida Lindborg	Sweden	2:16.23	Q
17	1	2	Ekaterina Tomashevskaya	Russia	2:16.30	Q
18	3	7	Sarah Bro	Denmark	2:16.76	
19	2	8	Věra Kopřivová	Czech Republic	2:17.67	
20	2	1	Martina van Berkel	Switzerland	2:17.90	
21	3	1	Justine Ress	France	2:17.91	
22	1	1	Camille Gheorghiu	France	2:18.78	
23	3	8	Karin Tomecková	Slovakia	2:19.04	
24	3	0	Aliaksandra Kavaleva	Belarus	2:22.75	
25	1	8	Andrea Basaraba	Serbia	2:23.13	

=== Semifinals ===
The semifinals were held 18:52.

==== Semifinal 1 ====
Rank	Lane	Name	Nationality	Time	Notes
1	4	Duane Da Rocha	Spain	2:09.13	Q
2	6	Elizabeth Simmonds	Great Britain	2:09.71	Q
3	3	Carlotta Zofkova	Italy	2:12.06	Q
4	2	Alicja Tchórz	Poland	2:13.29	
5	8	Ekaterina Tomashevskaya	Russia	2:14.27	
6	7	Jördis Steinegger	Austria	2:16.10	
7	1	Matea Samardžić	Croatia	2:16.26	
8	5	Katinka Hosszú	Hungary	2:20.04	

==== Semifinal 2 ====
Rank	Lane	Name	Nationality	Time	Notes
1	6	Simona Baumrtová	Czech Republic	2:10.22	Q
2	4	Jenny Mensing	Germany	2:10.26	Q
3	5	Lisa Graf	Germany	2:10.29	Q
4	3	Melani Costa	Spain	2:10.83	Q
5	2	Daria Ustinova	Russia	2:11.40	Q
6	7	Daryna Zevina	Ukraine	2:13.58	
7	8	Ida Lindborg	Sweden	2:15.03	
8	1	Klaudia Nazieblo	Poland	2:15.98	

=== Final ===
The final was held at 19:03.

Rank	Lane	Name	Nationality	Time	Notes
1st place, gold medalist(s)	4	Duane Da Rocha	Spain	2:09.37	
2nd place, silver medalist(s)	5	Elizabeth Simmonds	Great Britain	2:09.66	
3rd place, bronze medalist(s)	1	Daria Ustinova	Russia	2:09.79	
4	2	Lisa Graf	Germany	2:10.64	
5	3	Simona Baumrtová	Czech Republic	2:10.99	
6	7	Melani Costa	Spain	2:11.15	
7	6	Jenny Mensing	Germany	2:11.77	
8	8	Carlotta Zofkova	Italy	2:13.49	
