= 2010 FINA World Swimming Championships (25 m) – Women's 200 metre backstroke =

Women's 200m Backstroke at the 2010 Short Course Worlds
- Date: 17 December 2010
- Winning time: 2:01.67

Medalists
gold medal	Alexianne Castel	France
silver medal	Missy Franklin	United States
bronze medal	Zhou Yanxin	China

The Women's 200 Backstroke at the 10th FINA World Swimming Championships (25m) was swum on 17 December 2010 in Dubai, United Arab Emirates. 36 swimmers swam in the preliminary heats, with the top-8 advancing to a final that evening.

At the start of the event, the existing World (WR) and Championship records (CR) were:

- WR: (Japan) Shiho Sakai, (Berlin, Germany, 14 November 2009)
- CR: (Zimbabwe) Kirsty Coventry, (Manchester 2008)

== Results ==
=== Heats ===
Rank	Heat	Lane	Name	Time	Notes
1	3	3	Missy Franklin (USA)	2:03.26	Q
2	5	4	Alexianne Castel (FRA)	2:03.51	Q
3	1	6	Zhou Yanxin (CHN)	2:04.37	Q
4	5	5	Daryna Zevina (UKR)	2:04.62	Q
5	3	4	Sharon van Rouwendaal (NED)	2:04.63	Q
6	5	2	Madison White (USA)	2:05.93	Q
7	3	5	Simona Baumrtova (CZE)	2:06.13	Q
8	3	6	Zsuzsanna Jakabos (HUN)	2:06.50	Q
9	4	2	Fernanda González (MEX)	2:06.76	
10	5	6	Sinead Russell (CAN)	2:06.99	
11	4	5	Maria Gromova (RUS)	2:07.27	
11	5	3	Sophia Batchelor (NZL)	2:07.27	
13	4	3	Miyuki Takemura (JPN)	2:08.43	
14	4	6	Ekaterina Avramova (BUL)	2:09.00	
15	1	3	Xu Tianlongzi (CHN)	2:09.13	
16	4	4	Pernille Jessing Larsen (DEN)	2:09.48	
17	4	1	Jessica Pengelly (RSA)	2:11.25	
18	5	1	Martina van Berkel (SUI)	2:12.27	
19	3	7	Chen Ting (TPE)	2:13.04	
20	4	7	Isabella Arcila (COL)	2:13.18	
21	5	7	Sarah Rolko (LUX)	2:13.43	
22	4	8	Yulduz Kuchkarova (UZB)	2:15.25	
23	2	4	Jeserik Pinto (VEN)	2:16.95	
24	5	8	Carolina Alejandra Aguilar (PER)	2:17.43	
25	3	2	Hazal Sarikaya (TUR)	2:18.45	
26	3	8	Elimar Barrios (VEN)	2:18.90	
27	2	5	Monica Ramirez (AND)	2:19.32	
28	3	1	Iulia Olari (MDA)	2:20.20	
29	2	6	Nicola Muscat (MLT)	2:22.45	
30	2	3	Karen Vilorio (HON)	2:24.15	
31	2	1	Talisa Lanoe (KEN)	2:24.30	
32	2	2	Sara Hyajna (JOR)	2:27.43	
33	1	4	Vong Erica Man Wai (MAC)	2:33.00	
34	2	8	Cheyenne Rova (FIJ)	2:45.41	
35	1	5	Keanna Villagomez (NMI)	2:58.74	
–	2	7	Kirsten Ann Lapham (ZIM)	DNS	

=== Final ===
Rank	Lane	Name	Time	Notes
1st place, gold medalist(s)	5	Alexianne Castel (FRA)	2:01.67	
2nd place, silver medalist(s)	4	Missy Franklin (USA)	2:02.01	
3rd place, bronze medalist(s)	3	Zhou Yanxin (CHN)	2:03.22	
4	6	Daryna Zevina (UKR)	2:03.61	
5	2	Sharon van Rouwendaal (NED)	2:04.10	
6	1	Simona Baumrtova (CZE)	2:06.05	
7	7	Madison White (USA)	2:06.23	
8	8	Zsuzsanna Jakabos (HUN)	2:06.74	
