= Dorina Szekeres =

Hungarian swimmer

Personal information
- Nationality: Hungary
- Born: 30 July 1992 (age 34) Zalaegerszeg, Hungary

Sport
- Sport: Swimming
- Strokes: Backstroke
- Club: EuropTec Zalavíz (HUN)
- College team: Indiana Hoosiers (USA)
- Coach: Ray Looze (USA); Csaba Horvath (HUN)

Dorina Szekeres (born 30 July 1992 in Zalaegerszeg) is a former Hungarian swimmer, who specialized in the backstroke and IM events. She graduated from Indiana University with a bachelor's degree in sports marketing and management. Dorina is a founding member of the International Swimming League and held the role of general manager for Team Iron until August 2023.

== Swimming career ==
Szekeres is a three-time Hungarian national champion in the 200m backstroke event.

=== College career ===
Szekeres was member of the varsity swimming team for the Indiana Hoosiers and represented her school at three NCAA Championships. She was named team captain of the women's team at the end of her second year. In her sophomore year she became a Big Ten champion and an All-American in the 400m individual medley. Szekeres is also a Scholar All-American, an award presented to university athletes who have achieved both academic and athletic excellence.

=== International career ===
In 2007 Szekeres qualified for her first major international competition, the European Short Course championships. She finished 15th in the 200m backstroke.

In 2008 she placed 10th at the European Junior Championships in Belgrade. She qualified for the 2010 European Championships where she placed 15th.

She competed at the 2012 European Championship finishing 17th in the 200 backstroke.

She qualified for the women's 200 m backstroke at the 2012 Summer Olympics in London, by clearing a FINA B-standard entry time of 2:14.28 from the Hungarian Long Course Nationals in Debrecen. Szekeres failed to advance into the semifinals, as she placed thirty-fifth overall in the preliminaries.

In 2013 she cleared the FINA A-standard in the 400m individual medley.
