= Stephanie Proud =

English swimmer (born 1988)

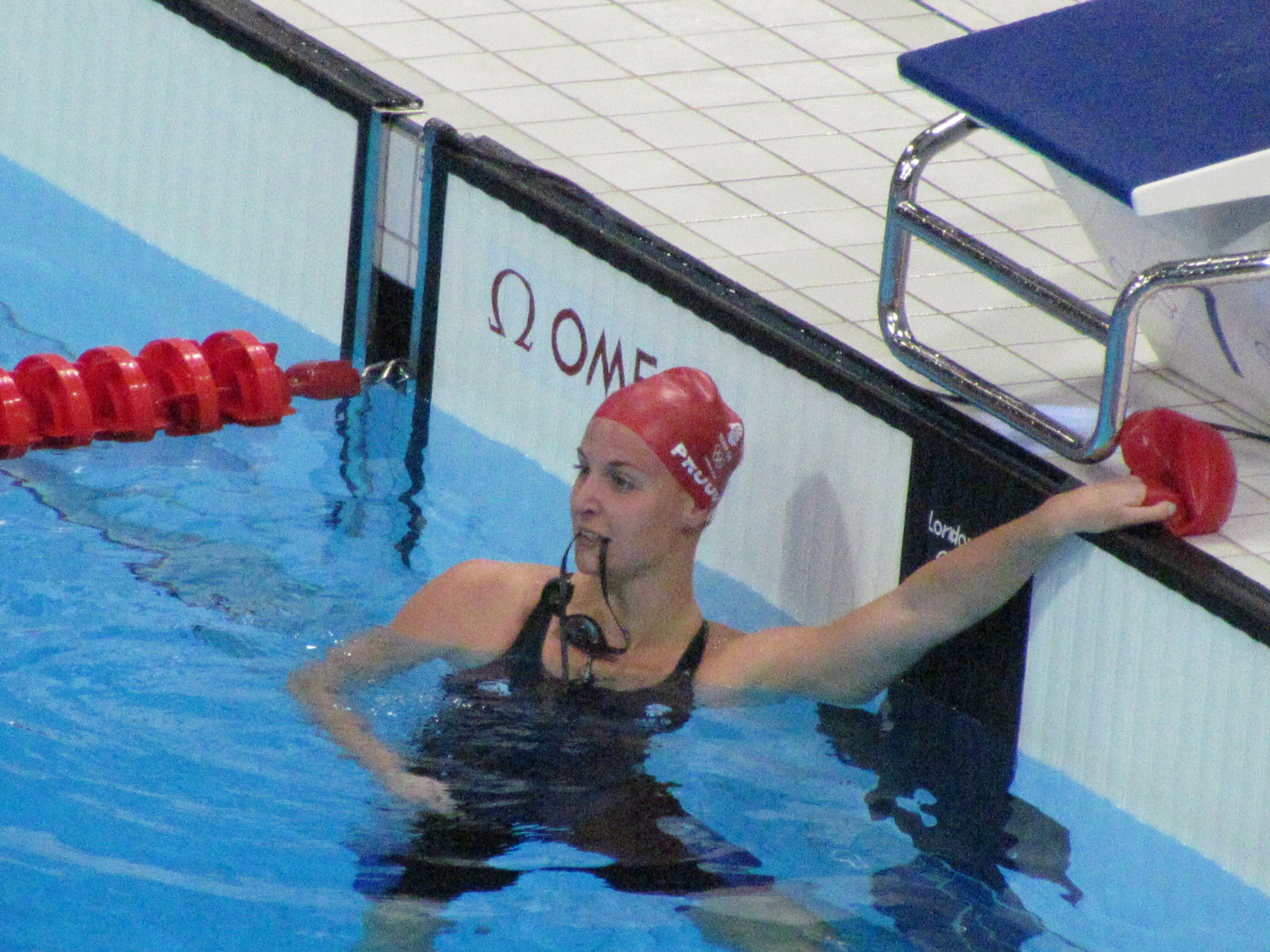
- Proud at the 2012 Summer Olympics

Personal information
- Full name: Stephanie Mary Proud
- National team: Great Britain
- Born: 29 August 1988 (age 37) Durham, England
- Height: 1.70 m (5 ft 7 in)
- Weight: 64 kg (141 lb; 10.1 st)

Sport
- Sport: Swimming
- Strokes: Backstroke
- College team: University of Florida (US)
Medal record
Women's swimming
Representing Great Britain
Summer Universiade
Gold medal – first place	2009 Belgrade	200 m backstroke

Stephanie Mary Proud (born 29 August 1988) is an English competitive swimmer who has represented Great Britain at the Olympics, and England in the Commonwealth Games.

As a member of the British team at the 2012 Summer Olympics in London, Proud competed in the women's 200-metre backstroke event. She advanced to the 200-metre event semifinals, and came ninth overall, with a time of 2:09.04.

== Personal bests and records held ==
Event	Long course	Short course
100 m backstroke	1:01.25, Delhi, 2010	59.38, Istanbul, 2009
200 m backstroke	2:08.91, Belgrade, 2009	2:05.52, Istanbul, 2009
200 m individual medley	2:18.10, Belgrade, 2009	2:13.82, Istanbul, 2009
400 m individual medley	4:41.21, Sunderland, 2010	4:35.55, Vienna, 2004
