= Lisa Graf =

German swimmer

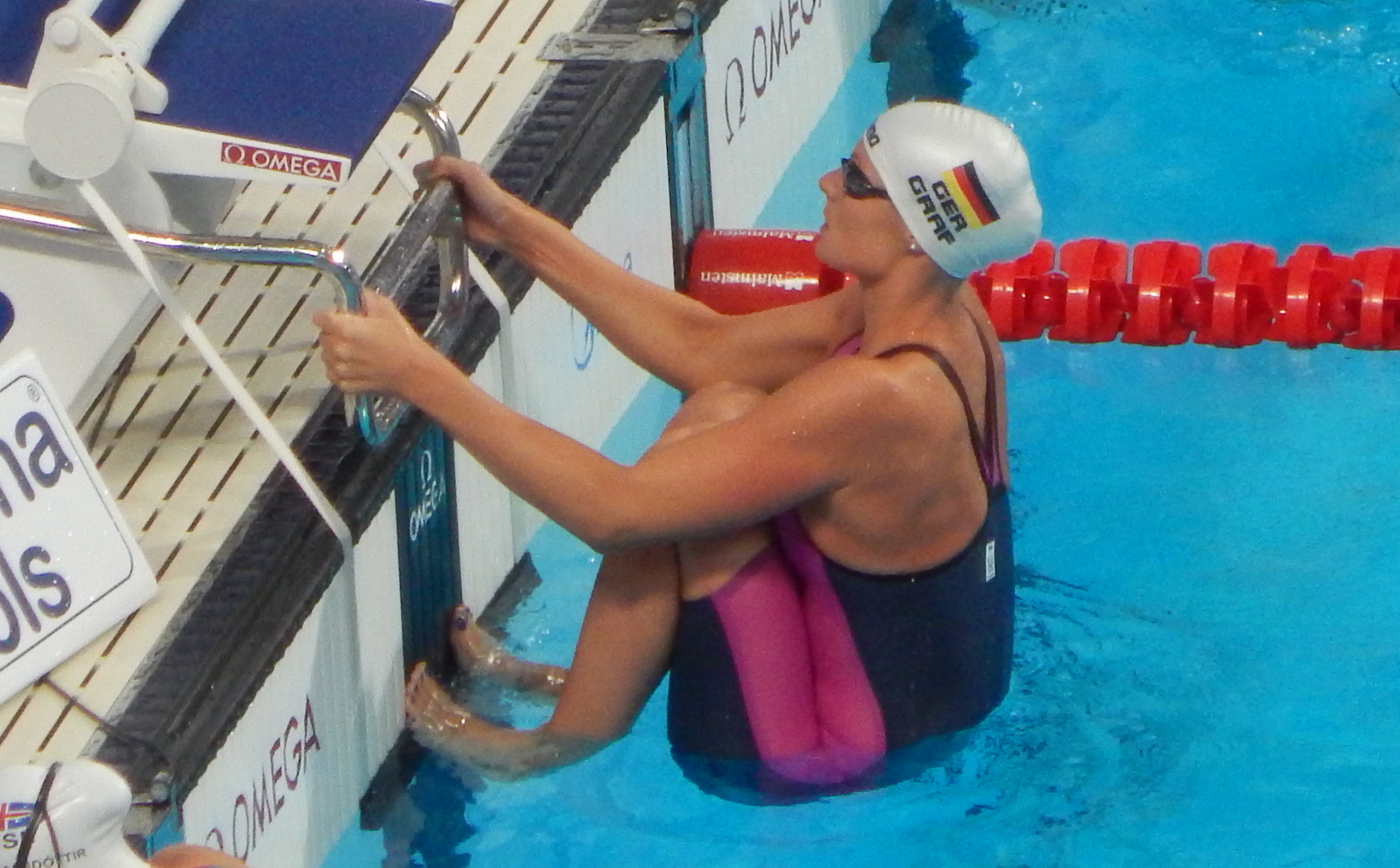
- Graf before 200m semi backstroke

Personal information
- National team: Germany
- Born: 13 November 1992 (age 33) Leipzig, Germany

Sport
- Sport: Swimming
- Strokes: Backstroke
- Club: SG Neukölln Berlin
- Coach: Gerd Esser
Medal record
Representing Germany
European Championships (LC)
Gold medal – first place	2012 Debrecen	4 × 100 m medley

Lisa Graf (born 13 November 1992) is a German competitive swimmer who specializes in backstroke. At the 2016 Summer Olympics in Rio de Janeiro she competed in the 200 meter backstroke. She qualified in tied 4th place for the semifinals where she was eliminated, finishing in 13th place.

At the 2014 European Aquatics Championships in Berlin, she finished 4th in the 200 meter backstroke. At the 2012 European Championships, she won a gold medley relay medal for swimming in the heats.
