= Yao Yige =

Chinese swimmer

Personal information
- National team: China
- Born: April 30, 1996 (age 28)

Sport
- Sport: Swimming

Yao Yige (born 30 April 1996) is a Chinese backstroke swimmer. She competed for China at the 2012 Summer Olympics.

== See also ==
- China at the 2012 Summer Olympics - Swimming
