= Shiho Sakai =

Japanese swimmer (born 1990)

Personal information
- Full name: Shiho Sakai
- Nationality: Japan
- Born: December 1, 1990 (age 35)
- Height: 159 cm (5 ft 3 in)
- Weight: 53 kg (117 lb)

Sport
- Sport: Swimming
- Strokes: backstroke
- Club: Bridgestone swimming school Koga
Medal record
Women's swimming
Summer Universiade
| Gold medal – first place | 2009 Belgrade | 50m backstroke |
| Gold medal – first place | 2009 Belgrade | 100m backstroke |
| Gold medal – first place | 2011 Shenzhen | 100 m backstroke |
| Gold medal – first place | 2011 Shenzhen | 200 m backstroke |
| Bronze medal – third place | 2011 Shenzhen | 4x100 m medley |
Asian Games
| Gold medal – first place | 2014 Incheon | 4x100m medley relay |
| Silver medal – second place | 2010 Guangzhou | 100m backstroke |
| Silver medal – second place | 2010 Guangzhou | 200m backstroke |

Shiho Sakai (酒井 志穂, Sakai Shiho; born December 1, 1990 in Koga, Fukuoka) is a Japanese backstroke swimmer.

== Major achievements ==
2009 Junior Pan Pacific Swimming Championships

- 100m backstroke 1st (1:01.13)
- 200m backstroke 2nd (2:12.00)

== Personal bests ==
In long course

- 50m backstroke: 27.88 (July 29, 2009)
- 100m backstroke: 59.14 Asian Japanese Record (July 28, 2009)
- 200m backstroke: 2:09.06 (August 28, 2008)

In short course

- 50m backstroke: 26.42 (February 21, 2009)
- 100m backstroke: 55.23 World record (November 15, 2009)
- 200m backstroke: 2:00.18 Former world record (November 14, 2009)

== See also ==
- World record progression 100 metres backstroke
- World record progression 200 metres backstroke

Records
| Preceded by Natalie Coughlin | Women's 100-meter backstroke world record-holder (short course); February 22, 2009 – December 4, 2014 | Succeeded by Katinka Hosszú |
| Preceded by Kirsty Coventry | Women's 200-meter backstroke world record-holder (short course); November 14, 2009 – October 22, 2011 | Succeeded by Missy Franklin |
