= Missy Franklin =

American swimmer, Olympic gold medalist (born 1995)

Missy Franklin Johnson
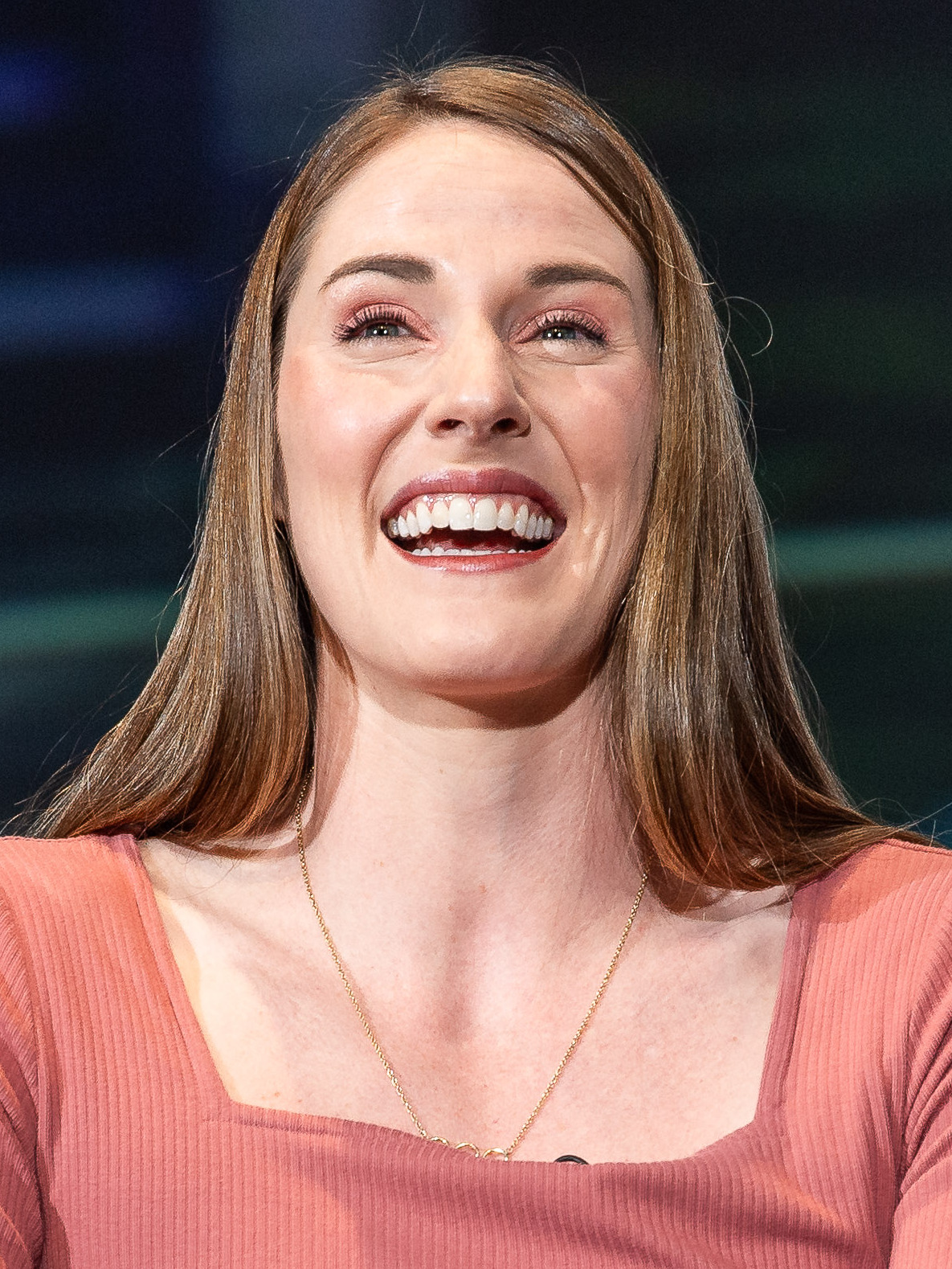
- Franklin in 2024

Personal information
- Full name: Melissa Franklin Johnson
- Nicknames: Missy, Missile
- National team: United States (Note: Franklin is a natural-born U.S. citizen who, by virtue of her parents being Canadian citizens, has Canadian citizenship. Franklin represents the United States exclusively in international competition.)
- Born: May 10, 1995 (age 31) Pasadena, California, U.S.
- Height: 6 ft 3 in (191 cm)
- Weight: 165 lb (75 kg)
- Spouse: Hayes Johnson (m. 2019)

Sport
- Sport: Swimming
- Strokes: Backstroke, freestyle, medley
- Club: Colorado Stars
- College team: University of California, Berkeley; University of Georgia
Medal record
Women's swimming
Representing United States
Event	1st	2nd	3rd
Summer Olympics	5	0	1
World Championships (LC)	11	2	3
World Championships (SC)	0	2	0
Pan Pacific Championships	1	2	1
Total	17	6	5
Olympic Games
Gold medal – first place	2012 London	100 m backstroke
Gold medal – first place	2012 London	200 m backstroke
Gold medal – first place	2012 London	4×200 m freestyle
Gold medal – first place	2012 London	4×100 m medley
Gold medal – first place	2016 Rio de Janeiro	4×200 m freestyle
Bronze medal – third place	2012 London	4×100 m freestyle
World Championships (LC)
Gold medal – first place	2011 Shanghai	200 m backstroke
Gold medal – first place	2011 Shanghai	4×200 m freestyle
Gold medal – first place	2011 Shanghai	4×100 m medley
Gold medal – first place	2013 Barcelona	100 m backstroke
Gold medal – first place	2013 Barcelona	200 m backstroke
Gold medal – first place	2013 Barcelona	200 m freestyle
Gold medal – first place	2013 Barcelona	4×100 m freestyle
Gold medal – first place	2013 Barcelona	4×200 m freestyle
Gold medal – first place	2013 Barcelona	4×100 m medley
Gold medal – first place	2015 Kazan	4×200 m freestyle
Gold medal – first place	2015 Kazan	4×100 m mixed freestyle
Silver medal – second place	2011 Shanghai	4×100 m freestyle
Silver medal – second place	2015 Kazan	200 m backstroke
Bronze medal – third place	2011 Shanghai	50 m backstroke
Bronze medal – third place	2015 Kazan	200 m freestyle
Bronze medal – third place	2015 Kazan	4×100 m freestyle
World Championships (SC)
Silver medal – second place	2010 Dubai	200 m backstroke
Silver medal – second place	2010 Dubai	4×100 m medley
Pan Pacific Championships
Gold medal – first place	2014 Gold Coast	4×200 m freestyle
Silver medal – second place	2014 Gold Coast	4×100 m freestyle
Silver medal – second place	2014 Gold Coast	4×100 m medley
Bronze medal – third place	2014 Gold Coast	100 m backstroke

Melissa Franklin Johnson (née Franklin; born May 10, 1995) is an American former competitive swimmer and five-time Olympic gold medalist. She held the world record in the 200-meter backstroke (long course) from 2012 to 2019. As a member of the U.S. national swim team, she also held the world records in the 4×100-meter medley relay (short course and long course).

In her Olympic debut at the 2012 Summer Olympics at age 17, Franklin won a total of five medals, four of which were gold. She swept the women's backstroke events, winning gold in both the 100-meter and 200-meter backstroke. Franklin's successes earned her Swimming World's World Swimmer of the Year and the American Swimmer of the Year award in 2012 as well as the FINA Swimmer of the Year Award in 2011 and 2012. In total, she won twenty-eight medals in international competition: seventeen gold, six silver, and five bronze, spanning the Olympics, the World Championships, the short course World Championships, and the Pan Pacific Championships. Franklin's eleven gold medals at the World Aquatics Championships was a record in women's swimming before Katie Ledecky broke it in 2017.

Franklin won the Laureus World Sportswoman of the Year award in 2014. In December 2018, she announced her retirement from the sport.

== Early life ==
Franklin was born in Pasadena, California, the only child of Dick and D. A. Franklin. When she was a baby, her mother was very worried about water safety, so Franklin started swimming purely because her parents wanted her to get comfortable with the water. She grew up in Aurora, Colorado, and began taking swimming classes there at the age of five, at the urging of her mother. She attended Regis Jesuit High School in Aurora, Colorado, and graduated in 2013.

Both of Franklin's parents are Canadian and Franklin holds American and Canadian dual citizenship. Her father, Dick, was born in St. Catharines, Ontario. A former All-Canadian football player for Saint Mary's University in Halifax, Nova Scotia, he played briefly for the Toronto Argonauts of the Canadian Football League as an offensive lineman. After an injury ended his football career, he returned to Halifax to pursue an MBA degree at Dalhousie University, where he met his future wife, a medical student. While working for 7-Up in Ontario, Dick was transferred to the United States. Ultimately the family settled in Denver, Colorado, where Dick had a senior position with Coors Brewing Company. Franklin's mother suggested that her daughter consider competing for Canada to ease the pressure of qualifying for the U.S. National Team due to the competitive depth of American swimmers. Franklin, however, chose to represent the United States, citing her patriotism for her homeland.

Franklin is 6 ft 2 in (188 cm) tall and has women's size 13 inch feet. "We call them built-in flippers," says her father. She has been coached by Todd Schmitz from the Colorado Stars club team since she was 7 years old.

During her rise to stardom surrounding the 2012 Olympics, Franklin continued to refuse prize money and endorsements so that she could maintain her amateur status to compete in college.

=== University of California Berkeley ===
In 2012, she accepted an athletic scholarship to attend the University of California, Berkeley, where she began swimming for coach Teri McKeever's California Golden Bears women's swimming team during the 2013–14 academic year. At Cal, Franklin was a four-time individual NCAA champion: winning the 200-yard freestyle in 2014 and 2015, and the 200-yard backstroke and individual medley in 2015. She won the Honda Sports Award as the nation's top female swimmer in 2015, as well as the Honda Cup awarded to the nation's top female athlete.

After the 2015 NCAA Swimming and Diving Championships, in which Franklin won three individual NCAA titles, Franklin turned professional, thus ending her NCAA career. After leaving Berkeley to train for the 2016 Olympics with her Colorado team, in January 2018 Franklin elected to begin training at the University of Georgia. She graduated with a degree in religion from the University of Georgia in December 2019.

== Swimming career ==
=== Early career ===
At the age of seven, Franklin joined the Colorado Stars travel swim team. It was not obvious to Franklin's parents that Missy possessed such a natural talent until other members’ parents brought it to her parents’ attention. At the age of twelve, Franklin began competing against girls who were much older than her. At the age of 13, Franklin competed at the 2008 U.S. Olympic Team Trials in Omaha, Nebraska, but did not qualify to swim in any events at the 2008 Summer Olympics. Her best result was 37th place in the 100-meter freestyle. By the time Missy graduated from high school, she possessed half of the Colorado High School Activities Association time records for girls high school swim.

=== 2010 ===
At the 2010 National Championships, Franklin competed in six individual events, and qualified to swim at the 2010 Pan Pacific Swimming Championships by finishing second in the 100- and 200-meter backstroke. At the 2010 Pan Pacific Swimming Championships, Franklin finished fourth in the 100-meter backstroke and did not make the A final for the 50- and 200-meter backstroke. Franklin earned the first international medals of her career at the 2010 FINA Short Course World Championships in Dubai. In the 200-meter backstroke, Franklin finished in second place, behind French swimmer Alexianne Castel. Franklin also earned a silver medal in the 4×100-meter medley relay for her contribution in the heats. For her performance in 2010, Franklin won the Breakout Performer of the Year Award at the seventh annual Golden Goggle Awards.

=== 2011 ===
==== 2011 World Championships ====
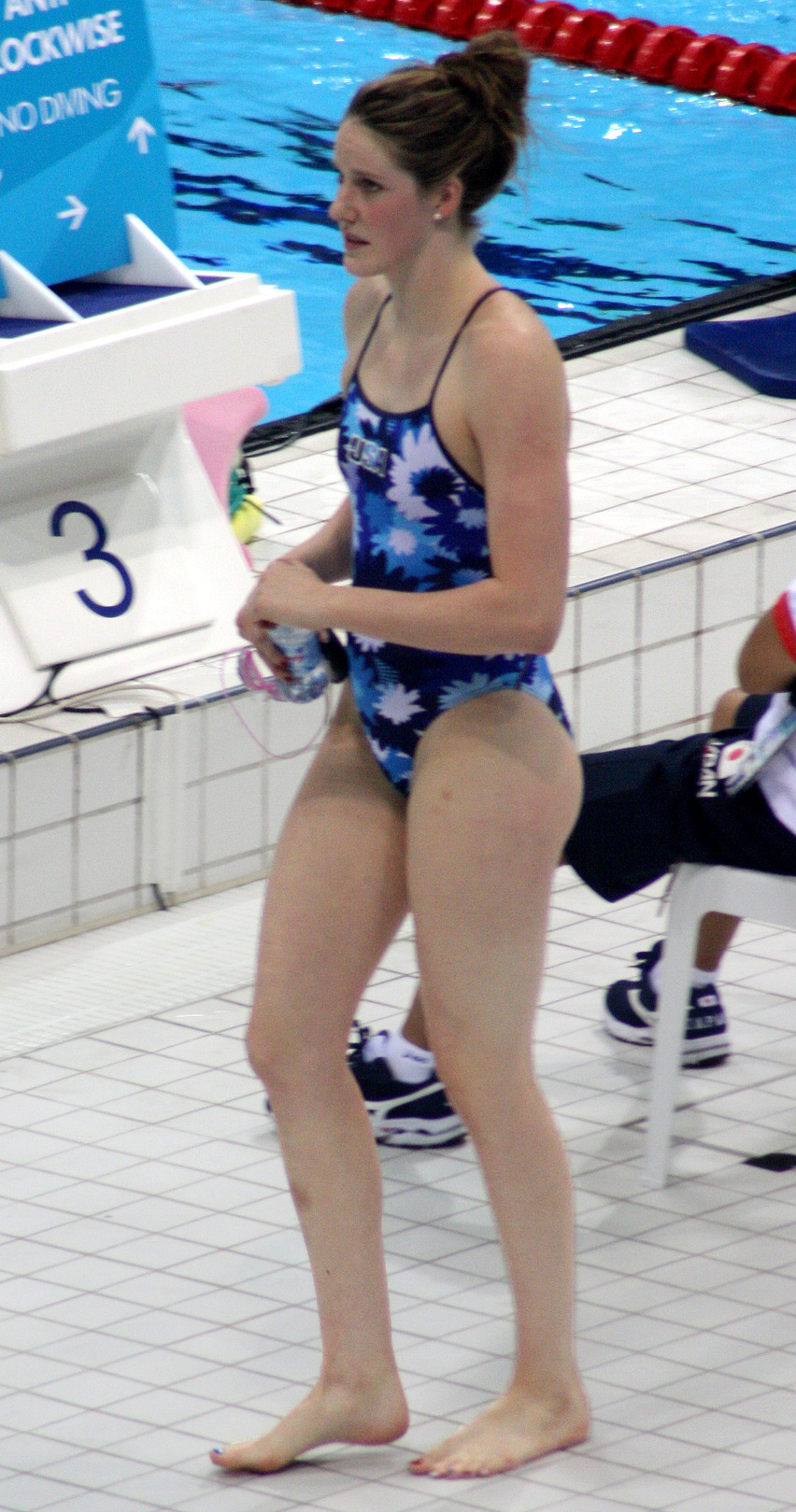
Franklin during warm up at the Aquatics Centre in 2012

In her first long course world championship meet at the 2011 World Aquatics Championships in Shanghai, Franklin won a total of five medals, three gold, one silver, and one bronze. In her first event, the 4×100-meter freestyle relay, Franklin won a silver medal with Natalie Coughlin, Jessica Hardy and Dana Vollmer in a time of 3:34.47. Swimming the second leg, Franklin had a split of 52.99, the second-best among all participants. Franklin won her first individual medal, a bronze, in the 50-meter backstroke, finishing behind Russian Anastasia Zuyeva and Japanese Aya Terakawa. Shortly after the 50-meter backstroke final, Franklin competed in the 4×200-meter freestyle relay with Dagny Knutson, Katie Hoff and Allison Schmitt and won gold ahead of Australia and China in a time of 7:46.14. Franklin's lead-off time of 1:55.06 was faster than the winning time of Italian Federica Pellegrini in the individual 200-meter freestyle final (1:55.58). After setting the national record in the semi-finals of the 200-meter backstroke (2:05.90), Franklin dominated the field in the final with a time of 2:05.10, breaking her own national record and winning gold. This was Franklin's first individual world title, and her time in the final was the third-fastest effort of all time. Shortly after the 200-meter backstroke final, Franklin competed in the 4×100-meter medley relay with Natalie Coughlin, Rebecca Soni, and Dana Vollmer and won gold with a time of 3:52.36, over three seconds ahead of second-place finisher China. Swimming the freestyle leg, Franklin had a split of 52.79, the fastest in the field. The final time of 3:52.36 for the medley relay was the second-fastest effort of all time, just behind the Chinese-owned world record of 3:52.19. For her performance at these championships, she won the Female Athlete of the Year, Female Race of the Year (200-meter backstroke), and the Relay Performance of the Year (4×100-meter medley relay) Award at the eighth annual Golden Goggle Awards. She was also named the best female swimmer for 2011 by FINA Aquatics World Magazine.

==== 2011 National Championships ====
Three days after the 2011 World Aquatics Championships ended in Shanghai on July 30, Franklin traveled to Palo Alto, California to compete at the 2011 National Championships, which began on August 2. At these championships, Franklin competed in four individual events, and the 4×100er career in the 100-meter backstroke and freestyle. She also placed fourth in the 200-meter individual medley and twelfth in the 50-meter freestyle.

==== First world records ====
Towards the end of 2011 in October, at the 2011 FINA Swimming World Cup, Franklin set the first world record of her career in the 200-meter backstroke, bettering the previous record of 2:00.13 held by Shiho Sakai with a time of 2:00.03. In breaking the record, Franklin became the first female to break an individual world record since the high-tech bodysuits were banned in January 2010. Franklin's second world record came at the 2011 Duel in the Pool in December. In the 4×100-meter medley relay, Franklin combined with Natalie Coughlin, Rebecca Soni, and Dana Vollmer to break the previous American-owned world record in a time of 3:45.56, bettering the previous record of 3:47.97. Swimming the freestyle leg, Franklin had a split of 51.32.

=== 2012 London Summer Olympics ===
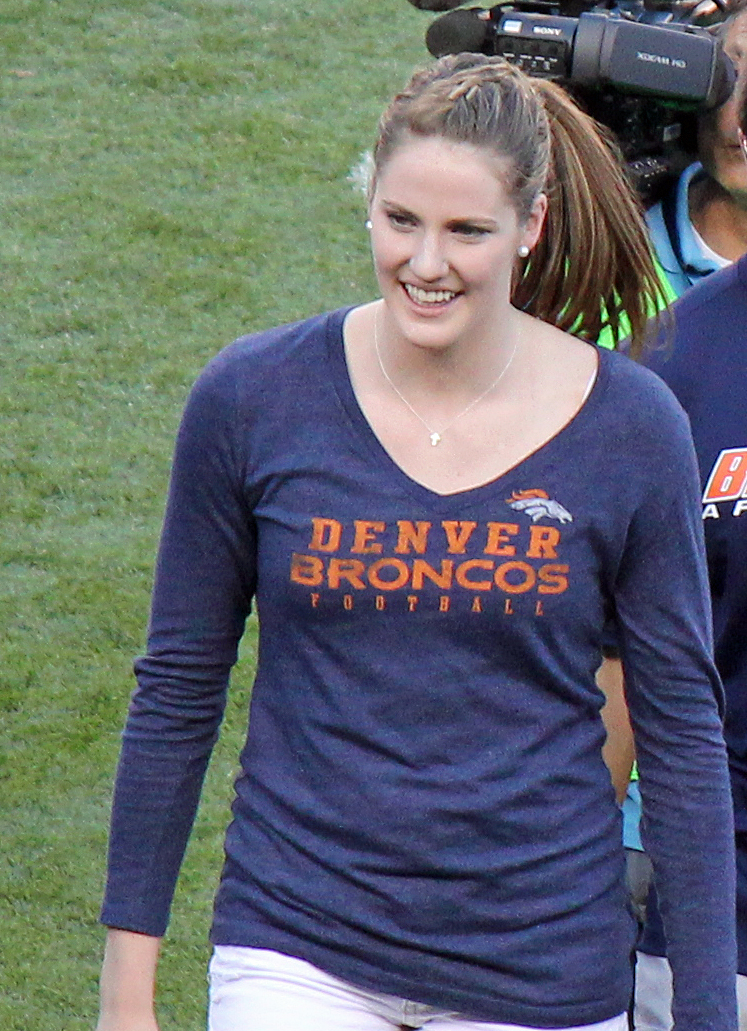
Franklin at an NFL game between the Denver Broncos and Pittsburgh Steelers on September 9, 2012

Medal record

Swimming

Representing the United States

Summer Olympics
Gold medal – first place	100 m backstroke	58.33 (AM)
Gold medal – first place	200 m backstroke	2:04.06 (WR)
Gold medal – first place	4×200 m freestyle	7:42.92 (OR)
Gold medal – first place	4×100 m medley	3:52.05 (WR)
Bronze medal – third place	4×100 m freestyle	3:34.24 (AM)

During the preparation for the London Summer Olympic trials, Franklin could be drug tested from six in the morning until eleven at night, and had to report where she was at all times. She would be given one hour a day and within that hour she had to be at that exact location, in case they would come to drug test her. Franklin started training for the London Olympics with Kara Lynn Joyce on the Colorado stars swim team. Within the London Olympic trials, Franklin became the first female to qualify for seven Olympic events.

==== Trials ====
At the 2012 United States Olympic Trials, Franklin qualified to swim in four individual events at the 2012 Summer Olympics. In her first event, the 100-meter backstroke, Franklin won the final with a time of 58.85, breaking Natalie Coughlin's American record of 58.94 seconds. In her second event, the 200-meter freestyle, Franklin placed second behind Allison Schmitt by over two seconds with a time of 1:56.79. In her third individual event, Franklin finished second in the 100-meter freestyle behind Jessica Hardy with a time of 54.15. Her second-place finish came less than half an hour after swimming in the 200-meter backstroke semi-finals, where she finished first overall with a time of 2:07.91. In the 200-meter backstroke final, her fourth individual event, Franklin finished first with a time of 2:06.12.

==== Olympics ====
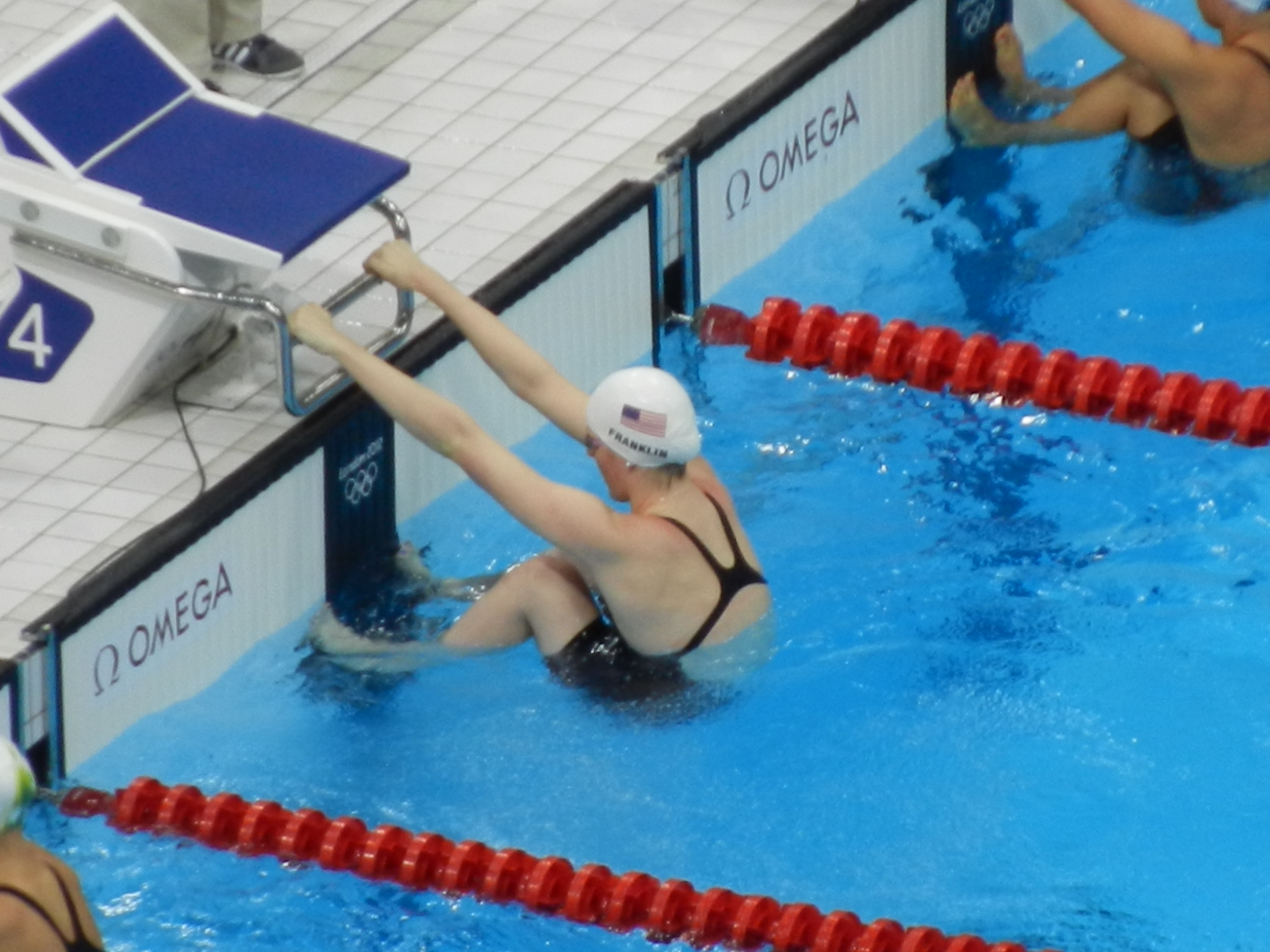
Franklin at the start of the 200-meter backstroke heats

On the first day of the swimming competition at the 2012 Olympics in London, Franklin won a bronze medal in the 4×100-meter freestyle relay with Jessica Hardy, Lia Neal, and Allison Schmitt, with the U.S. team finishing behind Australia and the Netherlands. Swimming the lead-off leg, Franklin had a personal best of 53.52 seconds and the team finished with a total time of 3:34.24, an American record. Franklin's first leg in the relay was also the fastest lead-off of the field. In her first individual event on the third day of the swimming competition, the 100-meter backstroke, Franklin won the gold medal with a time of 58.33 seconds, beating her own national record. Her win in the backstroke came less than fifteen minutes after completing the 200-meter freestyle semi-finals, where she qualified for the final. The following day, Franklin competed in the 200-meter freestyle and placed fourth in the final with a time of 1:55.82, one one-hundredth of a second behind third-place finisher Bronte Barratt. A day after the 200-meter freestyle, Franklin won her third medal of the meet, a gold, in the 4×200-meter freestyle relay with Dana Vollmer, Shannon Vreeland and Allison Schmitt. Swimming the lead-off leg, Franklin posted a time of 1:55.96 and the U.S. team finished with a time of 7:42.92, a new American record. A day after completing the relay, Franklin competed in her third individual event, 100-meter freestyle. In the final, Franklin placed fifth with a time of 53.64 seconds. Franklin was able to bounce back from that performance, and in her fourth and last individual event held the following day, the 200-meter backstroke, Franklin won her second individual gold of the Olympics with a world record time of 2:04.06, bettering Kirsty Coventry's record of 2:04.81. In winning the 200-meter backstroke, Franklin also became the first American female to win the event at the Olympics since Melissa Belote did in 1972, forty years earlier. In her final event, the 4×100-meter medley relay, Franklin won gold with Rebecca Soni, Dana Vollmer and Allison Schmitt. Swimming the backstroke leg, Franklin recorded a time of 58.50 seconds, and the U.S. team went on to set the world record with a time of 3:52.05, besting the Chinese-owned record of 3:52.19 set in 2009.

At the end of the year, Franklin was named the World Swimmer of the Year and American Swimmer of the Year by Swimming World Magazine. She was also named the best female swimmer for 2012 by FINA Aquatics World Magazine.

=== 2013 World Championships ===
Medal record

Swimming

Representing the United States

World Championships
Gold medal – first place	100 m backstroke	58.42
Gold medal – first place	200 m backstroke	2:04.76 (CR)
Gold medal – first place	200 m freestyle	1:54.81
Gold medal – first place	4×100 m freestyle	3:32.31 (AM)
Gold medal – first place	4×200 m freestyle	7:45.14
Gold medal – first place	4×100 m medley	3:53.23

At the 2013 US National Championships, Franklin qualified to swim in five individual events at the 2013 World Aquatics Championships. At the National Championships, she finished first in the 100- and 200-meter freestyle and backstroke, and second in the 50-meter backstroke.

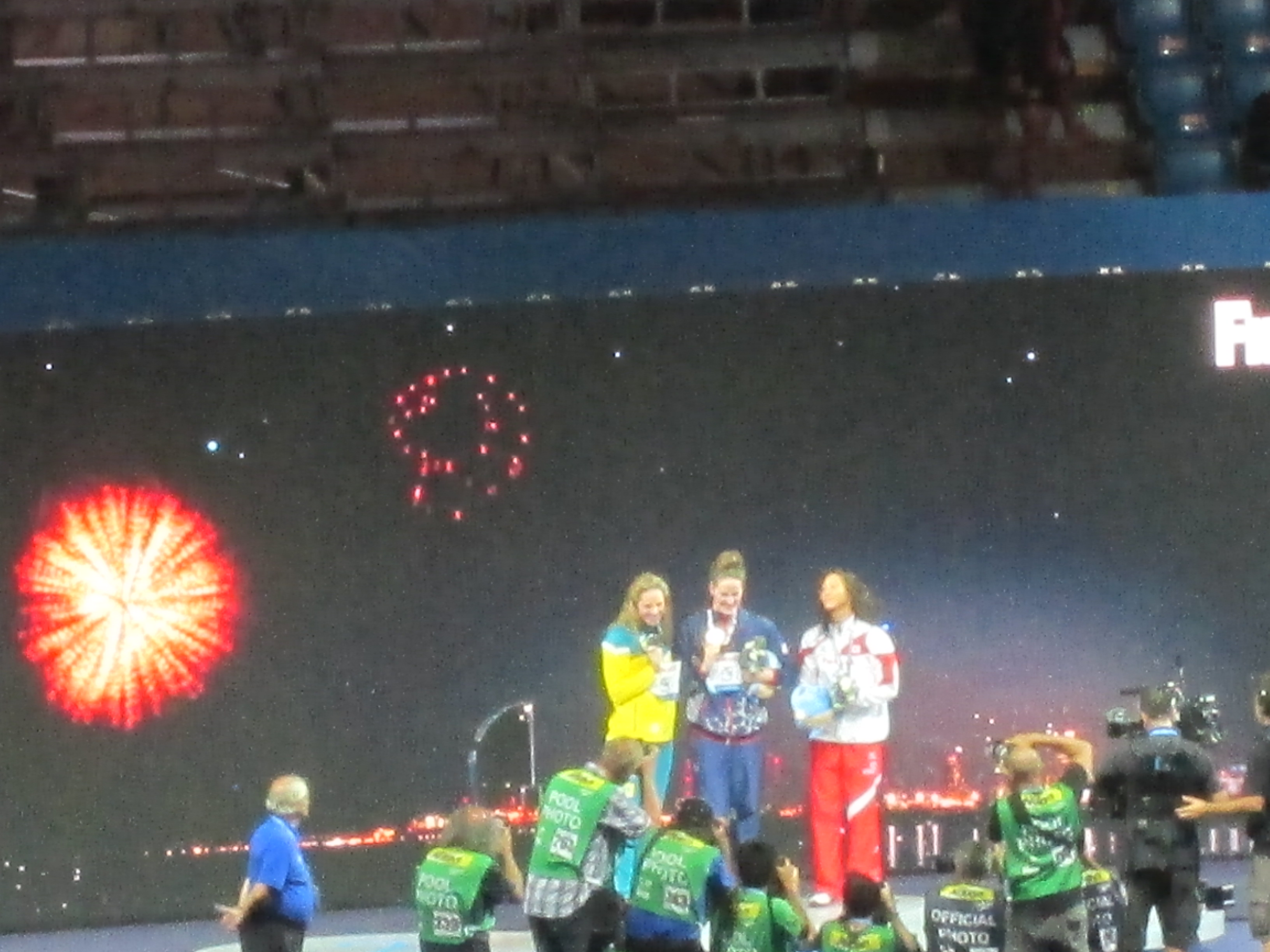
Franklin (middle) in 2013 World Aquatics Championships

At the 2013 World Aquatics Championships in Barcelona, Franklin swam seven total events – four individual and three relays, though she later withdrew from the 50-meter backstroke after the heats. At the meet, Franklin won six gold medals, setting a new record for the most golds won by a female swimmer at a single edition of the World Championships. Despite being the first woman in history to win six gold medals at a single World Championships, she lost out the award of Swimmer of the Meet to teammate Katie Ledecky for her two world record-breaking performances and four gold medals.

On the first day of the pool competition and her first event the 4×100-meter freestyle relay, Franklin lead-off the relay with a time of 53.51. She was over a second behind Australia's lead-off Cate Campbell, but teammates Natalie Coughlin and Shannon Vreeland made up some ground and anchor Megan Romano overtook the Australian team in the last 20 meters to give the Americans the gold medal. The final time of 3:32.31 was an American record, breaking the previous record of 3:34.24. In her first individual event held on the third day of the pool competition, the 100-meter backstroke, Franklin won gold in a time of 58.42, six-tenths of a second ahead of Emily Seebohm of Australia. On the fourth day, Franklin decided to scratch the 50-meter backstroke since it was right before the 200-meter freestyle. In the 200-meter freestyle, Franklin won her third gold in a personal best time of 1:54.81, touching 0.33 seconds ahead of second-place finisher Federica Pellegrini. On the fifth day, Franklin won gold in the 4×200-meter freestyle relay along with teammates Katie Ledecky, Shannon Vreeland, and Karlee Bispo. Swimming the anchor leg and diving in with a deficit of over a second, Franklin was able to track down Australian Alicia Coutts, recording a split of 1:54.27 and the team finishing with a time of 7:45.14. On the sixth day, Franklin competed in the 100-meter freestyle and placed fourth in the final with a time of 53.47, just missing the medal podium. A day after her 100-meter freestyle swim, Franklin successfully defended her title in the 200-meter backstroke, winning with a time of 2:04.76 and setting a new championship record. In her last event, the 4×100-meter medley relay, Franklin combined with Jessica Hardy, Dana Vollmer, and Megan Romano to win gold in a time of 3:53.23. Swimming the backstroke leg, Franklin recorded a time of 58.39.

=== 2014 ===
==== 2014 U.S. National Championships ====
At the 2014 U.S. National Championships, Franklin won the 100-meter backstroke with the third fastest American time ever, leading a sweep of the event by Cal Berkeley swimmers. She also won the 200-meter backstroke and the 100-meter freestyle, and finished second in the 200-meter freestyle behind Katie Ledecky.

==== 2014 Pan-Pacific Championships ====
Despite being hampered by a back injury, Franklin swam in four individual events and three team relays at the 2014 Pan Pacific Swimming Championships. In total, she won one gold, two silvers, and one bronze medal.

Franklin won her only individual medal in the 100-meter backstroke by finishing third with a time of 1:00.30. In the 100-meter freestyle and the 200-meter backstroke, she placed fourth. In the 200-meter freestyle, Franklin failed to qualify for the A final, but won the B final with the second-fastest time among all finalists, securing her place on the U.S. team for the 2015 World Championships in this event.

Franklin teamed with Shannon Vreeland, Leah Smith, and Katie Ledecky to win the 4×200-meter freestyle relay. Swimming with Simone Manuel, Abbey Weitzeil, and Vreeland, Franklin placed second in the 4×100-meter freestyle relay, and with teammates Jessica Hardy, Kendyl Stewart, and Manuel, she finished second in the 4×100-meter medley relay.

=== 2015 World Championships ===
Medal record

Swimming

Representing the United States

World Championships
Silver medal – second place	200 m backstroke	2:06.34
Bronze medal – third place	200 m freestyle	1:55.49
Bronze medal – third place	4×100 m freestyle	3:34.61
Gold medal – first place	4×100 m freestyle mixed	3:23.05 (WR)
Gold medal – first place	4×200 m freestyle	7:45.37

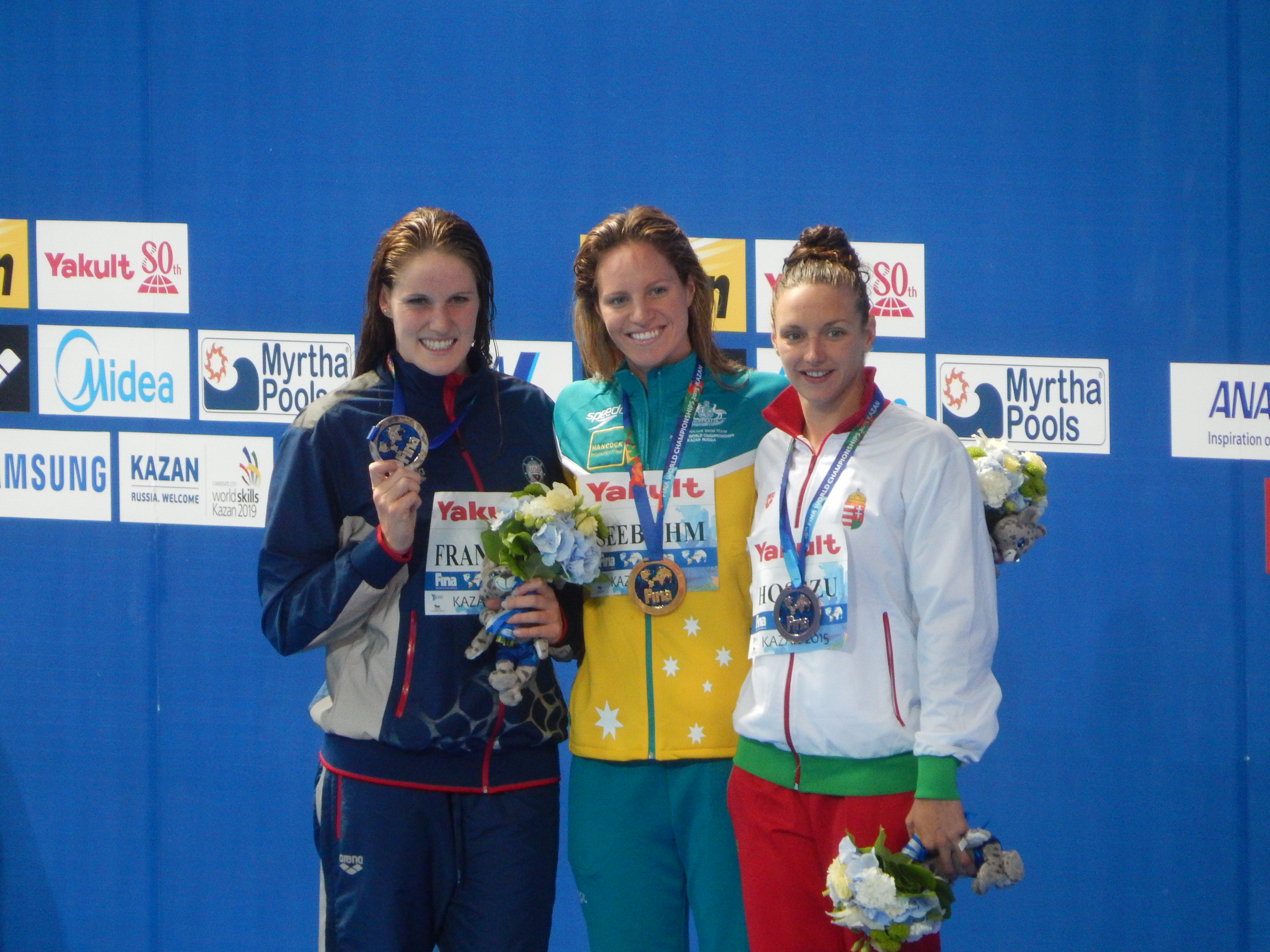
Franklin (left), Emily Seebohm and Katinka Hosszú in a victory ceremony of 2015 World Aquatics Championships

At the 2015 World Aquatics Championships in Kazan, Russia, Franklin competed in the 100- and 200-meter backstroke, the 100- and 200-meter freestyle, and four relay events. She won a bronze medal as a member of the U.S. team in the 4×100-meter freestyle relay, and another bronze in the 200-meter freestyle. She finished fifth in the final of the 100-meter backstroke. Franklin won her first gold medal of the 2015 championships as a member of the first-place U.S. team in the women's 4×200-meter freestyle relay. She also won a silver in the 200-meter backstroke event and gold in the mixed 4×100-meter freestyle relay.

=== 2015 FINA World Cup ===
On August 15 and 16, Franklin swam in the second stop of the 2015 FINA World Cup. She competed in four events: 100- and 200-meter backstroke; 100- and 200-meter freestyle. In the first day of the races she qualified for the final in the 200-meter backstroke and 200-meter freestyle events where she won bronze and silver, respectively. During the next day of the event, Franklin won silver in 100-meter freestyle and bronze in 100-meter backstroke.

=== 2016 Rio Summer Olympics ===
==== Trials ====
In 2016, Franklin placed second in the 200 m freestyle, 200 m backstroke, and also qualified for the 4 × 200 m freestyle team at the US Olympic Swimming Trials.

==== Olympics ====
At the 2016 Summer Olympics Franklin tied for 13th place in the 200m freestyle semifinals, with a time of 1:57.56, and did not make the cut for the finals. She placed 7th in the 200 meter backstroke for her heat in the semifinals and did not make the finals. Also at the 2016 Summer Olympics, Franklin won a gold medal in the 4 × 200 m freestyle relay for swimming in the heats.

=== Retirement ===
Franklin announced her retirement from the sport of swimming on December 19, 2018. She is an ambassador for the USA Swimming Foundation and is a principal spokesperson for the Saving Lives Is Always in Season national campaign.

== Personal bests ==
As of April 7, 2017

Long course
Event	Time	Meet	Date	Note(s)
50 m backstroke	27.98	2013 US National Championships	June 28, 2013	
100 m backstroke	58.33	2012 Summer Olympics	July 30, 2012	Former AM
200 m backstroke	2:04.06	2012 Summer Olympics	August 3, 2012	Former WR
100 m freestyle	53.36	2013 World Championships	August 1, 2013	
200 m freestyle	1:54.81	2013 World Championships	July 31, 2013	

Short course
Event	Time	Meet	Date	Note(s)
100 m backstroke	56.73	2011 World Cup	October 23, 2011	
200 m backstroke	2:00.03	2011 World Cup	October 22, 2011	
100 m freestyle	52.09	2011 World Cup	October 23, 2011	
200 m freestyle	1:52.74	2015 Duel in the Pool	December 12, 2019	
200 yd freestyle	1:39.10	2015 NCAA Division I Women's Swimming and Diving Champions	March 20, 2015	NR

== World records ==
No.	Pool	Distance	Event	Time	Meet	Location	Date	Age	Note(s)	Ref
1	SC	200 m	Backstroke	2:00.03	2011 World Cup	Berlin, Germany	October 22, 2011	16		
2	SC	4×100 m	Medley relay	3:45.56	2011 Duel in the Pool	Atlanta, Georgia, US	December 16, 2011	16	^{[a]}	
3	LC	200 m	Backstroke	2:04.06	2012 Summer Olympics	London, United Kingdom	August 3, 2012	17		
4	LC	4×100 m	Medley relay	3:52.05	2012 Summer Olympics	London, United Kingdom	August 4, 2012	17	^{[b]}	

^{a} Short course record with Natalie Coughlin, Rebecca Soni, and Dana Vollmer. Franklin swam the freestyle leg (anchor leg) in a time of 51.32.
^{b} Record set with Rebecca Soni, Dana Vollmer, and Allison Schmitt. Franklin swam the backstroke leg (lead-off leg) in a time of 58.50.

== Personal life ==
Franklin says her favorite athlete is Natalie Coughlin.

Franklin was raised Christian but did not attend church or identify as religious until reading the Bible and taking theology classes in high school. As a Religion major at the University of Georgia, she took courses in several religions, including Christianity, Judaism, Islam, Buddhism, and Hinduism. She had already practiced yoga recreationally for three years, but learning about its Hindu roots in college made it a more spiritual experience for her. At the time of her retirement, her academic interest in Hinduism was misreported as her being an adherent; in an interview about her Christian faith, Franklin said her Hindu interests were "blown a little bit out of proportion."

Franklin got engaged to Hayes Johnson, who swam at the University of Texas, on September 22, 2018. The couple married on September 14, 2019. In March 2021 she and her husband announced they were expecting a child. On August 11, 2021, their daughter Sarah Caitlin Johnson was born. On October 31, 2024, Franklin announced that she was pregnant with their second daughter. She gave birth to Chase Campbell Johnson on March 19, 2025.

== In popular culture ==
Franklin appeared in a March 2013 episode of Pretty Little Liars as herself. She is the subject of the 2014 documentary Touch the Wall along with Kara Lynn Joyce. The film is directed by Christo Brock and Grant Barbeito, and documents Franklin's and Joyce's journey to the 2012 London Olympics. The film was noted for its celebration of female physical and emotional strength. Franklin had a cameo in the big-budget comedy The Internship, starring Vince Vaughn and Owen Wilson.

== See also ==
- List of multiple Olympic gold medalists
- List of Olympic medalists in swimming (women)
- List of United States records in swimming
- List of World Aquatics Championships medalists in swimming (women)
- List of world records in swimming
- World record progression 200 metres backstroke
- World record progression 4 × 100 metres medley relay

== Bibliography ==
- Franklin, Missy; Franklin, D.A.; Franklin, Dick; with Daniel Paisner. Relentless Spirit: The Unconventional Raising of a Champion. New York, Dutton, December 6, 2016. ISBN 978-1-101-98492-5.

== Notes ==
Records
Preceded by Shiho Sakai	Women's 200-meter backstroke world record-holder (short course); October 22, 2011 – December 5, 2014	Succeeded by Katinka Hosszú
Preceded by Kirsty Coventry	Women's 200-meter backstroke world record-holder (long course); August 3, 2012 – July 26, 2019	Succeeded by Regan Smith
Awards
Preceded by Rebecca Soni	Swimming World; World Swimmer of the Year; 2012	Succeeded by Katie Ledecky
Preceded by Therese Alshammar	FINA Swimmer of the Year; 2011, 2012	Succeeded by Katie Ledecky
Preceded by Rebecca Soni	Swimming World; American Swimmer of the Year; 2012	Succeeded by Katie Ledecky
Preceded by Breanna Stewart	Best Female College Athlete ESPY Award; 2015	Succeeded by Incumbent
