= Lizzie Simmonds =

English swimmer

Elizabeth Simmonds
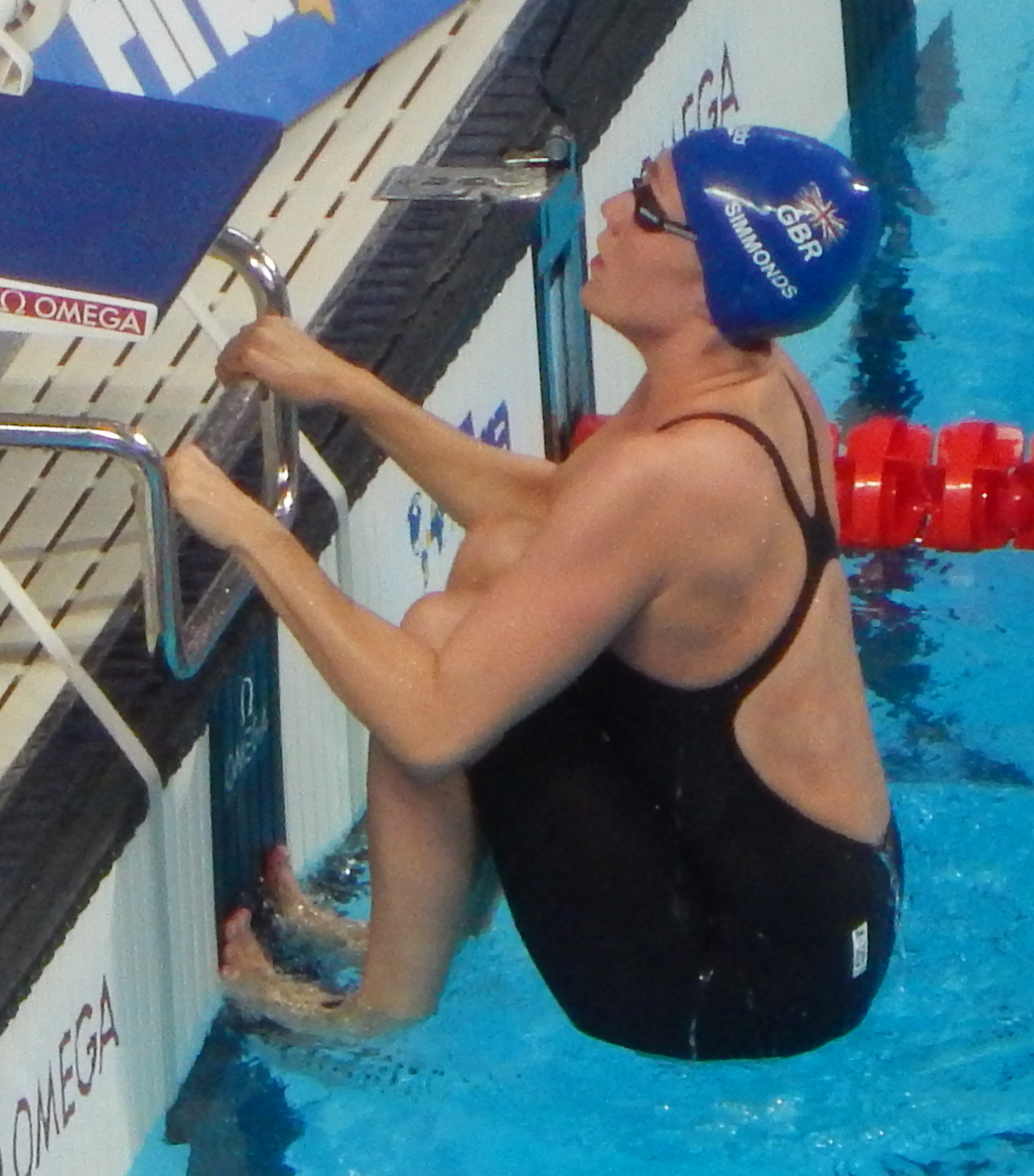
- Simmonds in Kazan 2015

Personal information
- Full name: Elizabeth Clare Simmonds
- National team: Great Britain
- Born: 22 January 1991 (age 35) Beverley, England
- Height: 1.71 m (5 ft 7 in)
- Weight: 60 kg (132 lb)
- Relative: Sibling: William Simmonds

Sport
- Sport: Swimming
- Strokes: Backstroke
- Club: Loughborough University SC; Lincoln Vulcans
Medal record
Women's swimming
Representing Great Britain
World Championships - Short course
Silver medal – second place	2008 Manchester	200 m backstroke
Bronze medal – third place	2008 Manchester	4×100 m medley
European Championships - Long course
Gold medal – first place	2008 Eindhoven	4×100 m medley
Gold medal – first place	2010 Budapest	200 m backstroke
Silver medal – second place	2010 Budapest	100 m backstroke
Silver medal – second place	2014 Berlin	200 m backstroke
European Championships - Short course
Bronze medal – third place	2006 Helsinki	200 m backstroke
Bronze medal – third place	2006 Helsinki	4×50 m medley
Bronze medal – third place	2008 Rijeka	200 m backstroke
Representing England
Commonwealth Games
Silver medal – second place	2010 Delhi	200 m backstroke
Silver medal – second place	2010 Delhi	4 x 100 metre medley relay

Elizabeth Clare Simmonds (born 22 January 1991) is an English competitive swimmer who has represented Great Britain in the Olympics, FINA World Aquatics Championships, and European championships, and England in the Commonwealth Games. She specialises in backstroke events, and is a former European champion in the 200-metre backstroke.

Simmonds represented Great Britain at the 2008 Summer Olympics in both the 100-metre and 200-metre backstroke swimming events. She also competed at the 2012 Summer Olympics in the 200-metre backstroke swimming event, coming in fourth place.

Simmonds went to secondary school in Lincoln and trained with the Vulcans Swimming Club, later attending Loughborough University. Her early career largely coincided with that of her friend, teammate and former World champion and record holder Gemma Spofforth, with whom she shared the gold and silver medals at both the 100 and 200 metre backstroke at the 2010 European Aquatics Championships.

== Personal bests and records held ==
Event	Long course	Short course
50 m backstroke	28.58	26.88
100 m backstroke	59.43	56.69 ^{NR}
200 m backstroke	2:06.79	2:00.91 ^{CR NR}
100 m individual medley	—N/a	1.02.01
200 m individual medley	2:14.44	2:08.61
400 m individual medley	4:55.56	4.51.09
100 m freestyle	58.19	54.95
200 m freestyle	2.01.68	1.57.78
400 m freestyle	4.15.26	4.06.19
Key: CR= Commonwealth Record, NR= National Record
