= Anja Čarman =

Slovenian swimmer (born 1985)

Personal information
- Full name: Anja Čarman
- Nationality: Slovenia
- Born: March 22, 1985 (age 41) Škofja Loka
- Height: 1.74 m (5 ft 9 in)
- Weight: 69 kg (152 lb)

Sport
- Sport: Swimming
- Strokes: Freestyle and backstroke
- Club: Plavalni Klub Tigrlav Kranj
Medal record
Women's swimming
European Championships (LC)
Silver medal – second place	2004 Madrid	200 m backstroke
Silver medal – second place	2004 Madrid	800 m freestyle
European Championships (SC)
Gold medal – first place	2001 Antwerp	400 m freestyle
Gold medal – first place	2007 Debrecen	200 m backstroke
Silver medal – second place	2001 Antwerp	800 m freestyle
Silver medal – second place	2012 Chartres	4×50 m mixed medley
Bronze medal – third place	2000 Valencia	200 m backstroke
Mediterranean Games
Gold medal – first place	2001 Tunis	400 m freestyle

Anja Čarman (born March 22, 1985) is a Slovenian swimmer. She won several medals at European LC and SC Championships and competed at 2004, 2008 and 2012 Summer Olympics. Anja is an alumnus of swimming powerhouse The Bolles School.
