= Alexianne Castel =

French swimmer (born 1990)

Personal information
- Nationality: France
- Born: 25 July 1990 (age 36) Bordeaux, France
- Height: 180 cm (5 ft 11 in)
- Weight: 76 kg (168 lb)

Sport
- Sport: Swimming
Medal record
Women's swimming
Representing France
World Championships (SC)
Gold medal – first place	2010 Dubai	200 m backstroke
European Championships (LC)
Gold medal – first place	2012 Debrecen	200 m backstroke
European Championships (SC)
Gold medal – first place	2009 Istanbul	200 m backstroke
Silver medal – second place	2008 Rijeka	200 m backstroke
Silver medal – second place	2012 Chartres	200 m backstroke
Mediterranean Games
Gold medal – first place	2009 Pescara	100 m backstroke
Bronze medal – third place	2009 Pescara	200 m backstroke

Alexianne Castel (born 25 July 1990) is a French swimmer from Bordeaux. She has won gold at World Championships. Castel represented France at the 2008 and 2012 Summer Olympics.
