= Duane Da Rocha =

Spanish swimmer

Duane Da Rocha Marcé
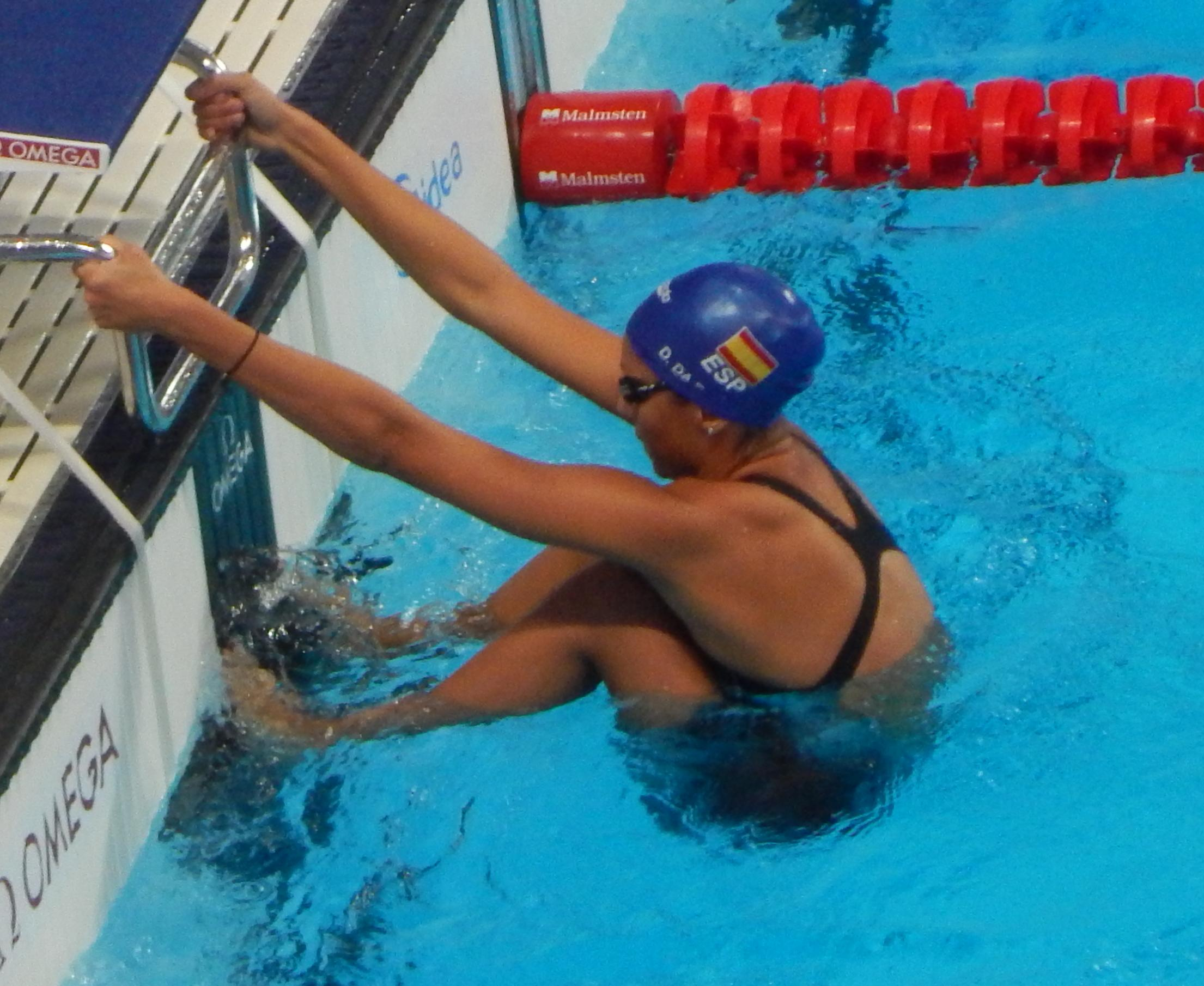
- Kazan 2015

Personal information
- Nationality: Brazilian; Spanish
- Born: January 7, 1988 (age 38) Brasília, DF, Brazil

Sport
- Sport: Swimming
Medal record
World Championships (SC)
Bronze medal – third place	2012 Istanbul	200 m backstroke
European Championships (LC)
Gold medal – first place	2014 Berlin	200 m backstroke
Bronze medal – third place	2010 Budapest	200 m backstroke
Bronze medal – third place	2012 Debrecen	200 m backstroke
European Championships (SC)
Gold medal – first place	2010 Eindhoven	200 m backstroke
Silver medal – second place	2011 Szczecin	200 m backstroke
Bronze medal – third place	2010 Eindhoven	100 m backstroke
Mediterranean Games
Silver medal – second place	2018 Tarragona	50 m backstroke
Silver medal – second place	2009 Pescara	100 m backstroke
Silver medal – second place	2009 Pescara	200 m backstroke
Silver medal – second place	2009 Pescara	4×100 m medley
Silver medal – second place	2018 Tarragona	4x100 m medley

Duane Da Rocha Marcé (born 7 January 1988) is a Brazilian-born Spanish swimmer. She has received medals for the Mediterranean Games, World Championships and European Championships.

She won the 200 metres backstroke gold medal in the 2014 European Swimming Championships in Berlin (Germany).

She was born in Brasília, Distrito Federal, to a Brazilian mother (Soraia da Rocha) and a Spanish father (José María Marcé).
