= Alicja Tchórz =

Polish swimmer (born 1992)

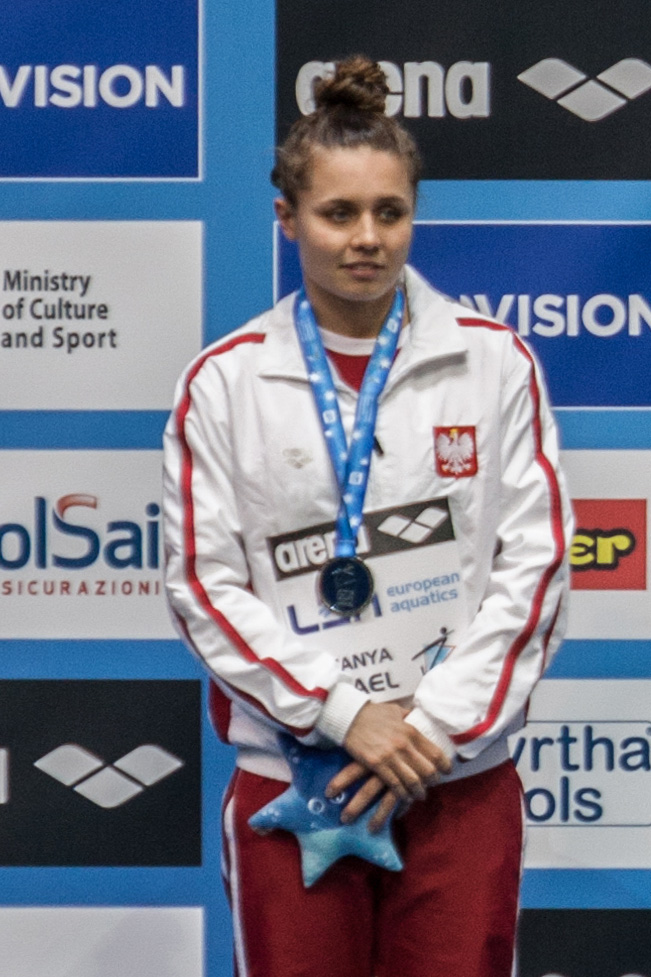
- Tchórz in 2015.

Personal information
- Nationality: Polish
- Born: 13 August 1992 (age 33) Kalisz, Greater Poland Voivodeship, Poland

Sport
- Sport: Swimming
- Strokes: Backstroke
Medal record
Representing Poland
Women's swimming
European Championships (SC)
Gold medal – first place	2019 Glasgow	4×50 m medley
Gold medal – first place	2021 Kazan	100 m medley
Silver medal – second place	2015 Netanya	100 m backstroke
Silver medal – second place	2017 Copenhagen	50 m backstroke
Bronze medal – third place	2019 Glasgow	50 m backstroke
Bronze medal – third place	2021 Kazan	4×50 m freestyle
Bronze medal – third place	2021 Kazan	4×50 m mixed freestyle
Military World Games
Bronze medal – third place	2019 Wuhan	50 m backstroke
Bronze medal – third place	2019 Wuhan	100 m backstroke
Bronze medal – third place	2019 Wuhan	4×100 m freestyle
Bronze medal – third place	2019 Wuhan	4×100 m medley
Women's lifesaving
World Games
Gold medal – first place	2022 Birmingham	4x50 m obstacle
Silver medal – second place	2017 Wrocław	200 m obstacle
Bronze medal – third place	2017 Wrocław	4×50 m medley
Bronze medal – third place	2022 Birmingham	200 m obstacle

Alicja Tchórz (born 13 August 1992) is a Polish swimmer. She competed at the 2012 Summer Olympics in the Women's 100 metre backstroke, finishing in 25th place in the heats, failing to qualify for the semifinals. She competed at the 2016 Summer Olympics in the Women's 100 metre backstroke.

In 2017, she competed at The World Games in 2017 in Lifesaving, where she won a silver and a bronze medal.

Alicja was part of the New York Breakers for the season 2 of the International Swimming League in 2020.

In 2021, she won gold medal in the 100m medley at the 2021 European Short Course Swimming Championships in Kazan, Russia.
