= Daryna Zevina =

Ukrainian swimmer

Personal information
- Nationality: Ukrainian
- Born: 1 September 1994 (age 31) Kyiv, Ukraine
- Height: 1.80 m (5 ft 11 in)
- Weight: 75 kg (165 lb)

Sport
- Sport: Swimming
- Strokes: Backstroke
- Club: Dynamo
Medal record
World Championships (SC)
Gold medal – first place	2012 Istanbul	200 m backstroke
Silver medal – second place	2016 Windsor	200 m backstroke
Bronze medal – third place	2014 Doha	100 m backstroke
European Championships (LC)
Silver medal – second place	2016 London	200 m backstroke
European Championships (SC)
Gold medal – first place	2010 Eindhoven	100 m backstroke
Gold medal – first place	2011 Szczecin	100 m backstroke
Gold medal – first place	2011 Szczecin	200 m backstroke
Gold medal – first place	2012 Chartres	100 m backstroke
Gold medal – first place	2012 Chartres	200 m backstroke
Gold medal – first place	2013 Herning	200 m backstroke
Silver medal – second place	2017 Copenhagen	200 m backstroke
Silver medal – second place	2019 Glasgow	200 m backstroke
Bronze medal – third place	2010 Eindhoven	200 m backstroke
Bronze medal – third place	2013 Herning	100 m backstroke
Summer Universiade
Silver medal – second place	2013 Kazan	200 m backstroke
Youth Olympic Games
Gold medal – first place	2010 Singapore	100 m backstroke
Silver medal – second place	2010 Singapore	50 m backstroke
Bronze medal – third place	2010 Singapore	200 m backstroke
World Junior Championships
Gold medal – first place	2011 Lima	50 m backstroke
Gold medal – first place	2011 Lima	100 m backstroke
Gold medal – first place	2011 Lima	200 m backstroke
European Junior Championships
Gold medal – first place	2009 Prague	100 m backstroke
Gold medal – first place	2009 Prague	200 m backstroke
Gold medal – first place	2010 Helsinki	100 m backstroke
Silver medal – second place	2009 Prague	50 m backstroke
Silver medal – second place	2010 Helsinki	50 m backstroke
Silver medal – second place	2010 Helsinki	200 m backstroke

Daryna Zevina (Ukrainian: Дарина Зевіна; born 1 September 1994) is a Ukrainian swimmer.

== Career ==
She has won several international juniors medals in her career, a gold medal at the 100 meter backstroke and a bronze medal at the 200 meter backstroke during the 2010 European Short Course Swimming Championships.

Also, in the 2010 Youth Olympic Games held in Singapore, she won a gold medal in the Women's 100 metre backstroke, a silver medal in the Women's 50m Backstroke and a bronze medal in the Women's 200 metre backstroke.

Zevina represented Ukraine at the 2012 Summer Olympics in London.
