= Swimming at the 2014 European Aquatics Championships – Women's 100 metre backstroke =

Women's 100 metre backstroke at the Swimming at the 2014 European Aquatics Championships
- Dates: 20–21 August
- Competitors: 39 from 21 nations
- Winning time: 59.63

Medalists
gold medal	Katinka Hosszú	Hungary
gold medal	Mie Nielsen	Denmark
bronze medal	Georgia Davies	Great Britain

The Women's 100 metre backstroke competition of the 2014 European Aquatics Championships was held on 20–21 August.

== Records ==
Prior to the competition, the existing world, European and championship records were as follows.

	Name	Nation	Time	Location	Date
World record	Gemma Spofforth	Great Britain	58.12	Rome	28 July 2009
European record	Gemma Spofforth	Great Britain	58.12	Rome	28 July 2009
Championship record	Anastasia Zuyeva	Russia	59.41	Eindhoven	21 March 2008

== Results ==
=== Heats ===
The heats were held at 10:17.

Rank	Heat	Lane	Name	Nationality	Time	Notes
1	4	4	Katinka Hosszú	Hungary	1:00.08	Q
2	5	4	Mie Nielsen	Denmark	1:00.13	Q
3	3	4	Georgia Davies	Great Britain	1:00.32	Q
4	3	5	Daryna Zevina	Ukraine	1:00.80	Q
5	3	3	Carlotta Zofkova	Italy	1:00.83	Q
6	5	3	Elizabeth Simmonds	Great Britain	1:00.92	Q
7	4	5	Simona Baumrtová	Czech Republic	1:00.98	Q
8	5	7	Ida Lindborg	Sweden	1:01.14	Q
9	5	5	Daria Ustinova	Russia	1:01.24	Q
10	4	3	Arianna Barbieri	Italy	1:01.40	Q
11	5	6	Jenny Mensing	Germany	1:01.52	Q
12	4	6	Duane Da Rocha	Spain	1:01.59	Q
13	5	2	Lisa Graf	Germany	1:01.67	Q
14	4	1	Mimosa Jallow	Finland	1:02.26	Q
15	4	8	Sanja Jovanović	Croatia	1:02.30	Q
16	3	0	Justine Ress	France	1:02.34	Q
17	3	2	Alicja Tchórz	Poland	1:02.47	
18	3	1	Mathilde Cini	France	1:02.51	
19	4	2	Mercedes Peris	Spain	1:02.56	
20	4	7	Ekaterina Tomashevskaya	Russia	1:02.82	
21	3	7	Klaudia Nazieblo	Poland	1:02.93	
22	5	9	Jördis Steinegger	Austria	1:03.40	
23	2	3	Camille Gheorghiu	France	1:03.51	
24	2	5	Sarah Bro	Denmark	1:03.63	
25	2	2	Anni Alitalo	Finland	1:03.96	
26	2	6	Ava Schollmayer	Slovenia	1:03.99	
27	5	1	Alina Vats	Ukraine	1:04.05	
28	4	9	Maria Kameneva	Russia	1:04.08	
29	5	8	Béryl Gastaldello	France	1:04.09	
30	4	0	Aliaksandra Kavaleva	Belarus	1:04.11	
31	3	9	Magdalena Kuras	Sweden	1:04.13	
32	5	0	Sviatlana Khakhlova	Belarus	1:04.40	
33	2	1	Ingibjörg Jónsdóttir	Iceland	1:04.46	
34	2	7	Matea Samardžić	Croatia	1:05.02	
35	1	4	Kätlin Sepp	Estonia	1:05.39	
36	2	8	Sigrid Sepp	Estonia	1:05.61	
37	2	0	Eva Gliožerytė	Lithuania	1:06.57	
38	1	5	Susanne Hirvonen	Finland	1:06.61	
39	1	3	Amina Kajtaz	Bosnia and Herzegovina	1:07.92	
—	2	4	Věra Kopřivová	Czech Republic		DNS
—	3	6	Michelle Coleman	Sweden		DNS
—	3	8	Karin Tomečková	Slovakia		DNS

=== Semifinals ===
The semifinals were held at 19:34.

==== Semifinal 1 ====
Rank	Lane	Name	Nationality	Time	Notes
1	4	Mie Nielsen	Denmark	59.51	Q
2	5	Daryna Zevina	Ukraine	1:00.42	Q
3	2	Arianna Barbieri	Italy	1:01.03	Q
4	3	Elizabeth Simmonds	Great Britain	1:01.35	
5	7	Duane Da Rocha	Spain	1:01.53	
6	6	Ida Lindborg	Sweden	1:01.66	
7	1	Mimosa Jallow	Finland	1:02.03	
8	8	Justine Ress	France	1:02.53	

==== Semifinal 2 ====
Rank	Lane	Name	Nationality	Time	Notes
1	5	Georgia Davies	Great Britain	1:00.18	Q
2	4	Katinka Hosszú	Hungary	1:00.19	Q
3	6	Simona Baumrtová	Czech Republic	1:00.53	Q
4	3	Carlotta Zofkova	Italy	1:00.60	Q
5	2	Daria Ustinova	Russia	1:00.95	Q
6	1	Lisa Graf	Germany	1:01.51	
6	7	Jenny Mensing	Germany	1:01.51	
8	8	Sanja Jovanović	Croatia	1:02.42	

=== Final ===
The final was held at 18:58.

Rank	Lane	Name	Nationality	Time	Notes
1st place, gold medalist(s)	3	Katinka Hosszú	Hungary	59.63	
1st place, gold medalist(s)	4	Mie Nielsen	Denmark	59.63	
3rd place, bronze medalist(s)	5	Georgia Davies	Great Britain	59.74	
4	6	Daryna Zevina	Ukraine	1:00.33	
5	2	Simona Baumrtová	Czech Republic	1:00.38	
6	7	Carlotta Zofkova	Italy	1:00.80	
7	8	Arianna Barbieri	Italy	1:00.86	
8	1	Daria Ustinova	Russia	1:00.90	
