= Swimming at the 2014 European Aquatics Championships – Women's 50 metre backstroke =

Women's 50 metre backstroke at the Swimming at the 2014 European Aquatics Championships
- Dates: 22–23 August
- Competitors: 44 from 22 nations
- Winning time: 27.81

Medalists
gold medal	Francesca Halsall	Great Britain
silver medal	Georgia Davies	Great Britain
bronze medal	Mie Nielsen	Denmark

The Women's 50 metre backstroke competition of the 2014 European Aquatics Championships was held on 22–23 August.

== Records ==
Prior to the competition, the existing world, European and championship records were as follows.

	Name	Nation	Time	Location	Date
World record	Zhao Jing	China	27.06	Rome	30 July 2009
European record	Daniela Samulski	Germany	27.23	Rome	30 July 2009
Championship record	Aleksandra Gerasimenya	Belarus	27.64	Budapest	14 August 2010

== Results ==
=== Heats ===
The heats were held at 10:14.

Rank	Heat	Lane	Name	Nationality	Time	Notes
1	3	4	Mie Nielsen	Denmark	27.93	Q
2	5	4	Georgia Davies	Great Britain	28.05	Q
3	4	4	Mercedes Peris	Spain	28.24	Q
4	4	5	Francesca Halsall	Great Britain	28.25	Q
5	5	6	Arianna Barbieri	Italy	28.32	Q
6	5	5	Aleksandra Gerasimenya	Belarus	28.34	Q
7	4	3	Aleksandra Urbanczyk	Poland	28.40	Q
8	3	5	Daria Ustinova	Russia	28.43	Q
9	5	3	Simona Baumrtová	Czech Republic	28.79	Q
10	4	2	Katinka Hosszú	Hungary	28.81	Q
11	5	7	Elena Gemo	Italy	28.83	Q
12	4	6	Sanja Jovanović	Croatia	28.86	Q
13	3	2	Elizabeth Simmonds	Great Britain	28.88	
14	3	1	Mathilde Cini	France	28.89	Q
15	3	0	Mimosa Jallow	Finland	28.91	Q
15	5	0	Carlotta Zofkova	Italy	28.91	
15	3	3	Duane Da Rocha	Spain	28.91	Q
18	4	7	Anni Alitalo	Finland	29.05	Q
19	3	8	Ida Lindborg	Sweden	29.06	
20	2	3	Justine Ress	France	29.15	
21	5	8	Béryl Gastaldello	France	29.17	
22	5	1	Klaudia Nazieblo	Poland	29.20	
23	4	1	Sviatlana Khakhlova	Belarus	29.21	
24	3	6	Maria Kameneva	Russia	29.24	
25	5	2	Amit Ivry	Israel	29.25	
26	2	5	Ekaterina Tomashevskaya	Russia	29.28	
27	2	1	Caroline Pilhatsch	Austria	29.46	
27	2	4	Ava Schollmayer	Slovenia	29.46	
29	4	8	Alicja Tchórz	Poland	29.47	
30	5	9	Camille Gheorghiu	France	29.50	
31	3	7	Ingibjörg Jónsdóttir	Iceland	29.52	
32	2	6	Desiree Felner	Austria	29.71	
33	2	2	Alina Vats	Ukraine	29.72	
34	2	0	Patricia Hais	Austria	29.81	
35	3	9	Magdalena Kuras	Sweden	29.92	
36	2	8	Hanna-Maria Seppälä	Finland	29.96	
37	4	9	Aliaksandra Kavaleva	Belarus	30.01	
38	1	5	Sigrid Sepp	Estonia	30.11	
39	2	7	Karin Tomecková	Slovakia	30.14	
40	1	4	Susanne Hirvonen	Finland	30.16	
41	2	9	Julia Kukla	Austria	30.61	
42	1	2	Kätlin Sepp	Estonia	30.72	
43	1	3	Eva Gliožerytė	Lithuania	31.01	
44	1	6	Amina Kajtaz	Bosnia and Herzegovina	31.54	
—	4	0	Katarína Listopadová	Slovakia		DNS

=== Semifinals ===
The semifinals were held at 18:51.

==== Semifinal 1 ====
Rank	Lane	Name	Nationality	Time	Notes
1	4	Georgia Davies	Great Britain	28.13	Q
2	5	Francesca Halsall	Great Britain	28.19	Q
3	3	Aleksandra Gerasimenya	Belarus	28.46	Q
4	6	Daria Ustinova	Russia	28.48	Q
5	7	Sanja Jovanović	Croatia	28.50	
6	1	Mimosa Jallow	Finland	28.71	
7	2	Katinka Hosszú	Hungary	28.86	
8	8	Anni Alitalo	Finland	28.94	

==== Semifinal 2 ====
Rank	Lane	Name	Nationality	Time	Notes
1	4	Mie Nielsen	Denmark	27.78	Q
2	5	Mercedes Peris	Spain	27.91	Q
3	3	Arianna Barbieri	Italy	28.30	Q
4	7	Elena Gemo	Italy	28.44	Q
5	6	Aleksandra Urbanczyk	Poland	28.49	
6	1	Mathilde Cini	France	28.55	
7	2	Simona Baumrtová	Czech Republic	28.64	
8	8	Duane Da Rocha	Spain	28.81	

=== Final ===
The final was held at 16:57.

Rank	Lane	Name	Nationality	Time	Notes
1st place, gold medalist(s)	6	Francesca Halsall	Great Britain	27.81	
2nd place, silver medalist(s)	3	Georgia Davies	Great Britain	27.82	
3rd place, bronze medalist(s)	4	Mie Nielsen	Denmark	27.87	
4	5	Mercedes Peris	Spain	27.98	
5	2	Arianna Barbieri	Italy	28.36	
6	1	Aleksandra Gerasimenya	Belarus	28.37	
7	7	Elena Gemo	Italy	28.59	
8	8	Daria Ustinova	Russia	28.63	
