= Swimming at the 2012 European Aquatics Championships – Women's 100 metre backstroke =

Women's 100 metre backstroke at the 2012 European Aquatics Championships
- Dates: May 23, 2012 (heats and semifinals); May 24, 2012 (final)
- Competitors: 45 from 25 nations
- Winning time: 1:00.08

Medalists
| gold medal | Jenny Mensing | Germany |
| silver medal | Arianna Barbieri | Italy |
| bronze medal | Simona Baumrtová | Czech Republic |

The women's 100 metre backstroke competition of the swimming events at the 2012 European Aquatics Championships took place May 23 and 24. The heats and semifinals took place on May 23, the final on May 24.

== Records ==
Prior to the competition, the existing world, European and championship records were as follows.

| | Name | Nation | Time | Location | Date |
|---|---|---|---|---|---|
| World record European record | Gemma Spofforth | Great Britain | 58.12 | Rome | July 28, 2009 |
| Championship record | Anastasia Zuyeva | Russia | 59.41 | Eindhoven | March 21, 2008 |

== Results ==
=== Heats ===
45 swimmers participated in 6 heats.

| Rank | Heat | Lane | Name | Nationality | Time | Notes |
|---|---|---|---|---|---|---|
| 1 | 4 | 5 | Arianna Barbieri | Italy | 1:00.26 | Q, NR |
| 2 | 5 | 6 | Carlotta Zofkova | Italy | 1:00.76 | Q |
| 3 | 6 | 4 | Daryna Zevina | Ukraine | 1:00.98 | Q |
| 4 | 6 | 5 | Jenny Mensing | Germany | 1:01.23 | Q |
| 5 | 4 | 4 | Duane da Rocha Marce | Spain | 1:01.28 | Q |
| 6 | 4 | 3 | Ekaterina Avramova | Bulgaria | 1:01.38 | Q |
| 7 | 5 | 3 | Elena Gemo | Italy | 1:01.43 | |
| 8 | 4 | 6 | Simona Baumrtová | Czech Republic | 1:01.44 | Q, NR |
| 9 | 6 | 3 | Cloe Credeville | France | 1:01.49 | Q |
| 10 | 6 | 7 | Lisa Graf | Germany | 1:01.61 | Q |
| 11 | 5 | 4 | Alexianne Castel | France | 1:01.65 | Q |
| 12 | 5 | 5 | Mercedes Peris | Spain | 1:01.78 | Q |
| 13 | 5 | 2 | Alicja Tchorz | Poland | 1:02.27 | Q |
| 14 | 5 | 1 | Eszter Povázsay | Hungary | 1:02.38 | Q |
| 15 | 6 | 1 | Klaudia Nazieblo | Poland | 1:02.64 | Q |
| 16 | 5 | 8 | Sanja Jovanović | Croatia | 1:02.75 | Q |
| 17 | 4 | 1 | Hazal Sarikaya | Turkey | 1:02.82 | Q |
| 18 | 3 | 6 | Uschi Halbreiner | Austria | 1:02.97 | |
| 19 | 3 | 4 | Iryna Glavnyk | Ukraine | 1:03.10 | |
| 20 | 5 | 7 | Annemarie Worst | Netherlands | 1:03.12 | |
| 21 | 4 | 7 | Eygló Ósk Gústafsdóttir | Iceland | 1:03.30 | NR |
| 22 | 4 | 2 | Melanie Nocher | Ireland | 1:03.42 | |
| 23 | 2 | 5 | Alzbeta Rehorková | Czech Republic | 1:03.58 | |
| 23 | 6 | 8 | Ivana Gabrilo | Switzerland | 1:03.58 | |
| 25 | 6 | 2 | Therese Svendsen | Sweden | 1:03.80 | |
| 26 | 3 | 3 | Klára Václavíková | Czech Republic | 1:03.95 | |
| 27 | 2 | 3 | Anni Alitalo | Finland | 1:04.14 | |
| 28 | 3 | 5 | Anna Volchkov | Israel | 1:04.20 | |
| 29 | 3 | 2 | Fabienne Nadarajah | Austria | 1:04.50 | |
| 30 | 2 | 6 | Lotta Nevalainen | Finland | 1:04.51 | |
| 31 | 2 | 1 | Gizem Cam | Turkey | 1:04.68 | |
| 32 | 3 | 1 | Katarína Milly | Slovakia | 1:04.69 | |
| 33 | 2 | 8 | Tatiana Perstniova | Moldova | 1:04.71 | |
| 34 | 2 | 7 | Mimosa Jallow | Finland | 1:04.85 | |
| 35 | 2 | 4 | Veronica Orheim Bjørlykke | Norway | 1:04.99 | |
| 36 | 3 | 8 | Dorina Szekeres | Hungary | 1:05.02 | |
| 37 | 1 | 2 | Johanna Gerda Gustafsdottir | Iceland | 1:05.38 | |
| 38 | 2 | 2 | Desiree Felner | Austria | 1:05.50 | |
| 39 | 1 | 5 | Mònica Ramirez Abella | Andorra | 1:05.77 | |
| 40 | 1 | 3 | Valeria Mihhailova | Estonia | 1:06.47 | |
| 41 | 1 | 4 | Karin Tomecková | Slovakia | 1:06.89 | |
| 42 | 1 | 6 | Birita Debes | Faroe Islands | 1:07.21 | |
| | 3 | 7 | Katarzyna Gorniak | Poland | DSQ | |
| | 4 | 8 | Michelle Coleman | Sweden | DSQ | |
| | 6 | 6 | Kira Toussaint | Netherlands | DSQ | |

=== Semifinals ===
The eight fasters swimmers advanced to the final.

==== Semifinal 1 ====
| Rank | Lane | Name | Nationality | Time | Notes |
|---|---|---|---|---|---|
| 1 | 2 | Alexianne Castel | France | 1:00.48 | |
| 2 | 5 | Jenny Mensing | Germany | 1:00.58 | Q |
| 3 | 4 | Carlotta Zofkova | Italy | 1:01.00 | Q |
| 4 | 6 | Cloe Credeville | France | 1:01.44 | Q |
| 5 | 3 | Ekaterina Avramova | Bulgaria | 1:01.48 | Q |
| 6 | 7 | Alicja Tchorz | Poland | 1:02.33 | |
| 7 | 1 | Klaudia Nazieblo | Poland | 1:02.51 | |
| 8 | 8 | Hazal Sarikaya | Turkey | 1:02.98 | |

==== Semifinal 2 ====
| Rank | Lane | Name | Nationality | Time | Notes |
|---|---|---|---|---|---|
| 1 | 5 | Daryna Zevina | Ukraine | 1:00.45 | Q |
| 2 | 4 | Arianna Barbieri | Italy | 1:00.52 | Q |
| 3 | 3 | Duane da Rocha Marce | Spain | 1:00.56 | Q |
| 4 | 6 | Simona Baumrtová | Czech Republic | 1:00.88 | Q, NR |
| 5 | 7 | Mercedes Peris | Spain | 1:01.71 | |
| 6 | 2 | Lisa Graf | Germany | 1:02.05 | |
| 7 | 8 | Sanja Jovanović | Croatia | 1:02.47 | |
| 8 | 1 | Eszter Povázsay | Hungary | 1:02.74 | |

=== Final ===
The final was held at 17:53.

| Rank | Lane | Name | Nationality | Time | Notes |
|---|---|---|---|---|---|
| 1st place, gold medalist(s) | 6 | Jenny Mensing | Germany | 1:00.08 | |
| 2nd place, silver medalist(s) | 5 | Arianna Barbieri | Italy | 1:00.54 | |
| 3rd place, bronze medalist(s) | 2 | Simona Baumrtová | Czech Republic | 1:00.57 | NR |
| 4 | 4 | Daryna Zevina | Ukraine | 1:00.59 | |
| 5 | 3 | Duane da Rocha Marce | Spain | 1:00.89 | |
| 6 | 7 | Carlotta Zofkova | Italy | 1:01.01 | |
| 7 | 8 | Ekaterina Avramova | Bulgaria | 1:01.48 | |
| 8 | 1 | Cloe Credeville | France | 1:01.54 | |
