= 2014 FINA World Swimming Championships (25 m) – Women's 100 metre backstroke =

Women's 100 metre backstroke at the 2014 FINA World Swimming Championships (25 m)
- Dates: 3 December (heats and semifinals); 4 December (final)
- Competitors: 73 from 55 nations
- Winning time: 55.03

Medalists
gold medal	Katinka Hosszú	Hungary
silver medal	Emily Seebohm	Australia
bronze medal	Daryna Zevina	Ukraine

The women's 100 metre backstroke competition of the 2014 FINA World Swimming Championships (25 m) was held on 3 December with the heats and the semifinals and 4 December with the final.

== Records ==
Prior to the competition, the existing world and championship records were as follows.

	Name	Nation	Time	Location	Date
World record	Shiho Sakai	Japan	55.23	Berlin	15 November 2009
Championship record	Natalie Coughlin	United States	56.08	Dubai	16 December 2010

The following records were established during the competition:

Date	Event	Name	Nation	Time	Record
3 December	Heats	Katinka Hosszú	Hungary	55.70	CR
4 December	Final	Katinka Hosszú	Hungary	55.03	WR, CR

== Results ==
=== Heats ===
The heats were held at 11:28.

Rank	Heat	Lane	Name	Nationality	Time	Notes
1	8	4	Katinka Hosszú	Hungary	55.70	Q, CR
2	7	4	Emily Seebohm	Australia	56.59	Q
3	6	4	Mie Nielsen	Denmark	57.05	Q
4	8	5	Daryna Zevina	Ukraine	57.07	Q
5	6	3	Kathleen Baker	United States	57.11	Q
6	8	3	Etiene Medeiros	Brazil	57.36	Q, SA
7	7	5	Madison Wilson	Australia	57.48	Q
8	8	2	Simona Baumrtová	Czech Republic	57.61	Q
9	6	5	Sayaka Akase	Japan	57.67	Q
10	7	3	Michelle Coleman	Sweden	57.70	Q
11	5	0	Amy Bilquist	United States	57.82	Q
12	7	6	Georgia Davies	Great Britain	57.90	Q
13	6	8	Duane Da Rocha	Spain	58.15	Q
13	7	8	Hilary Caldwell	Canada	58.15	Q
15	6	6	Daria Ustinova	Russia	58.16	Q
16	6	1	Arianna Barbieri	Italy	58.26	Q
17	8	8	Yekaterina Rudenko	Kazakhstan	58.44	
18	8	7	Shiho Sakai	Japan	58.46	
19	7	9	Alicja Tchórz	Poland	58.56	
20	5	5	Andrea Berrino	Argentina	58.60	
21	6	7	Carolina Colorado Henao	Colombia	58.75	
22	5	8	Kimberly Buys	Belgium	58.87	
23	7	7	Eygló Ósk Gústafsdóttir	Iceland	59.06	
24	8	1	Amit Ivry	Israel	59.08	
25	8	6	Wang Xueer	China	59.21	
26	5	4	Genevieve Cantin	Canada	59.42	
27	7	2	Stephanie Au	Hong Kong	59.44	
28	6	0	Ekaterina Avramova	Turkey	59.46	
29	6	9	Chen Jie	China	59.54	
30	8	0	Mathilde Cini	France	59.55	
31	7	0	Ida Lindborg	Sweden	59.63	
31	8	9	Mimosa Jallow	Finland	59.63	
33	4	5	Isabella Arcila	Colombia	59.73	
34	7	1	Jenny Mensing	Germany	59.77	
35	6	2	Anastasiia Osipenko	Russia	59.95	
36	5	3	Jördis Steinegger	Austria	1:00.04	
37	5	7	Tereza Grusová	Czech Republic	1:00.27	
38	5	2	Sarah Bro	Denmark	1:00.40	
39	4	3	Anni Alitalo	Finland	1:00.83	
40	4	8	Zanre Oberholzer	Namibia	1:00.90	
41	4	4	Elise Olsen	Norway	1:00.94	
42	4	7	Ranohon Amanova	Uzbekistan	1:00.98	
43	3	2	Anna Schegoleva	Cyprus	1:01.02	
44	3	4	Erin Gallagher	South Africa	1:01.17	
45	5	9	Lehesta Kemp	South Africa	1:01.22	
46	4	6	Karolina Hájková	Slovakia	1:01.40	
47	4	9	Ajna Késely	Hungary	1:02.01	
48	4	2	Tatiana Perstniova	Moldova	1:02.19	
49	5	1	Alexus Laird	Seychelles	1:02.20	
50	2	7	Caylee Watson	United States Virgin Islands	1:02.22	
51	5	6	Ambra Esposito	Italy	1:02.53	
52	3	3	Sezin Eligül	Turkey	1:03.07	
53	3	5	Roxanne Yu	Philippines	1:03.09	
53	4	1	Inés Remersaro	Uruguay	1:03.09	
55	3	8	Araya Wongvat	Thailand	1:03.77	
56	3	9	Mónica Ramírez	Andorra	1:03.93	
57	3	6	Lauren Hew	Cayman Islands	1:04.37	
58	3	7	Talisa Lanoe	Kenya	1:04.47	
59	4	0	Lara Butler	Cayman Islands	1:05.32	
60	2	6	Chiara Gualtieri	San Marino	1:06.00	
61	2	3	Maeform Borriello	Honduras	1:06.27	
62	2	5	Evelina Afoa	Samoa	1:06.46	
63	3	0	Deandre Small	Barbados	1:07.20	
64	3	1	Ariana Herranz	Philippines	1:07.36	
65	2	2	Anna-Liza Mopio-Jane	Papua New Guinea	1:07.98	
66	2	8	Yuliya Stisyuk	Azerbaijan	1:08.45	
67	2	1	Shanice Paraka	Papua New Guinea	1:09.72	
68	2	4	Estellah Fils	Madagascar	1:09.99	
69	2	0	Meryem Bada	Morocco	1:10.70	
70	2	9	Areeba Shaikh	Pakistan	1:14.49	
71	1	4	Sonia Tumiotto	Tanzania	1:16.35	
72	1	5	Diana Basho	Albania	1:16.86	
73	1	6	Roylin Akiwo	Palau	1:19.18	
—	1	3	Goodnews Egirgi	Nigeria		DNS

=== Semifinals ===
The semifinals were held at 18:44.

==== Semifinal 1 ====
Rank	Lane	Name	Nationality	Time	Notes
1	5	Daryna Zevina	Ukraine	56.23	Q
2	4	Emily Seebohm	Australia	56.32	Q
3	7	Georgia Davies	Great Britain	56.82	Q
4	3	Etiene Medeiros	Brazil	57.13	Q, SA
5	6	Simona Baumrtová	Czech Republic	57.37	
6	2	Michelle Coleman	Sweden	57.51	
7	1	Hilary Caldwell	Canada	57.88	
8	8	Arianna Barbieri	Italy	58.50	

==== Semifinal 2 ====
Rank	Lane	Name	Nationality	Time	Notes
1	4	Katinka Hosszú	Hungary	56.65	Q
2	5	Mie Nielsen	Denmark	56.87	Q
3	6	Madison Wilson	Australia	56.91	Q
4	3	Kathleen Baker	United States	57.25	Q
5	2	Sayaka Akase	Japan	57.52	
6	7	Amy Bilquist	United States	57.65	
7	1	Duane Da Rocha	Spain	57.80	
8	8	Daria Ustinova	Russia	58.07	

=== Final ===
The final was held at 19:00.

Rank	Lane	Name	Nationality	Time	Notes
1st place, gold medalist(s)	3	Katinka Hosszú	Hungary	55.03	WR
2nd place, silver medalist(s)	5	Emily Seebohm	Australia	55.31	OC
3rd place, bronze medalist(s)	4	Daryna Zevina	Ukraine	55.54	
4	7	Madison Wilson	Australia	56.37	
5	2	Mie Nielsen	Denmark	56.62	
6	8	Kathleen Baker	United States	57.07	
7	1	Etiene Medeiros	Brazil	57.72	
8	6	Georgia Davies	Great Britain	57.77	
