= Swimming at the 2012 European Aquatics Championships – Women's 50 metre backstroke =

Women's 50 metre backstroke at the 2012 European Aquatics Championships
- Dates: May 25, 2012 (heats and semifinals); May 26, 2012 (final)
- Competitors: 42 from 24 nations
- Winning time: 28.25

Medalists
gold medal	Mercedes Peris	Spain
silver medal	Arianna Barbieri	Italy
silver medal	Sanja Jovanović	Croatia

The women's 50 metre backstroke competition of the swimming events at the 2012 European Aquatics Championships took place May 25 and 26. The heats and semifinals took place on May 25, the final on May 26.

== Records ==
Prior to the competition, the existing world, European and championship records were as follows.

	Name	Nation	Time	Location	Date
World record	Zhao Jing	China	27.06	Rome	July 30, 2009
European record	Daniela Samulski	Germany	27.23	Rome	July 30, 2009
Championship record	Aleksandra Gerasimenya	Belarus	27.64	Budapest	August 14, 2010

== Results ==
=== Heats ===
43 swimmers participated in 6 heats.

Rank	Heat	Lane	Name	Nationality	Time	Notes
1	6	5	Aleksandra Urbanczyk	Poland	28.44	NR
2	6	4	Mercedes Peris	Spain	28.45	Q
3	4	5	Arianna Barbieri	Italy	28.55	Q
4	4	7	Carlotta Zofkova	Italy	28.72	Q
5	4	4	Jenny Mensing	Germany	28.75	Q
6	5	6	Sanja Jovanović	Croatia	28.81	Q
7	5	3	Ekaterina Avramova	Bulgaria	28.97	Q
8	5	4	Theodora Drakou	Greece	29.05	Q
9	6	7	Klaudia Nazieblo	Poland	29.07	Q
10	4	3	Simona Baumrtová	Czech Republic	29.19	Q
11	6	6	Lisa Graf	Germany	29.20	Q
12	6	2	Ingibjörg Kristín Jónsdóttir	Iceland	29.23	Q
13	5	5	Daryna Zevina	Ukraine	29.25	Q
14	5	7	Ivana Gabrilo	Switzerland	29.31	Q
15	5	8	Anni Alitalo	Finland	29.32	Q
16	3	5	Kira Toussaint	Netherlands	29.35	Q
17	6	1	Alicja Tchórz	Poland	29.51	
18	5	2	Hazal Sarikaya	Turkey	29.52	Q
19	4	1	Alzbeta Rehorkova	Czech Republic	29.58	
20	4	6	Fabienne Nadarajah	Austria	29.59	
21	3	7	Aneta Pechancova	Czech Republic	29.68	
21	4	8	Klára Václavíková	Czech Republic	29.68	
23	3	1	Hanna-Maria Seppälä	Finland	29.75	
24	6	8	Valery Svigir	Croatia	29.82	
25	2	4	Mimosa Jallow	Finland	29.90	
26	2	5	Katarína Milly	Slovakia	30.02	
26	3	4	Annemarie Worst	Netherlands	30.02	
28	3	6	Eszter Povázsay	Hungary	30.05	
29	5	1	Therese Svendsen	Sweden	30.06	
30	2	2	Uschi Halbreiner	Austria	30.09	
31	3	2	Lotta Nevalainen	Finland	30.10	
32	3	3	Desiree Felner	Austria	30.13	
33	3	8	Gizem Cam	Turkey	30.23	
34	2	7	Tatiana Perstniova	Moldova	30.38	
34	2	8	Valeria Mihhailova	Estonia	30.38	
36	1	5	Birita Debes	Faroe Islands	30.60	NR
36	2	6	Veronica Orheim Bjørlykke	Norway	30.60	
38	2	3	Dorina Szekeres	Hungary	30.69	
39	2	1	Anna Volchkov	Israel	30.97	
40	1	4	Gabriela Ņikitina	Latvia	31.11	
41	1	3	Johanna Gerda Gústafsdóttir	Iceland	31.48	
	4	2	Katarzyna Gorniak	Poland	DSQ	
	6	3	Elena Gemo	Italy	DNS	

=== Semifinals ===
The eight fasters swimmers advanced to the final.

==== Semifinal 1 ====
Rank	Lane	Name	Nationality	Time	Notes
1	4	Arianna Barbieri	Italy	28.30	Q
2	5	Jenny Mensing	Germany	28.47	Q
3	6	Klaudia Nazieblo	Poland	28.72	Q
4	3	Ekaterina Avramova	Bulgaria	28.78	Q
5	7	Daryna Zevina	Ukraine	29.18	
6	2	Lisa Graf	Germany	29.22	
7	8	Hazal Sarikaya	Turkey	29.29	
8	1	Anni Alitalo	Finland	29.30	

==== Semifinal 2 ====
Rank	Lane	Name	Nationality	Time	Notes
1	4	Mercedes Peris	Spain	28.33	Q
2	3	Sanja Jovanović	Croatia	28.52	Q
3	2	Simona Baumrtová	Czech Republic	28.57	Q
4	5	Carlotta Zofkova	Italy	28.65	Q
5	6	Theodora Drakou	Greece	28.93	
6	7	Ingibjörg Kristín Jónsdóttir	Iceland	29.14	
7	1	Ivana Gabrilo	Switzerland	29.26	
8	8	Kira Toussaint	Netherlands	29.40	

=== Final ===
The final was held at 17:57.

Rank	Lane	Name	Nationality	Time	Notes
1st place, gold medalist(s)	5	Mercedes Peris	Spain	28.25	
2nd place, silver medalist(s)	4	Arianna Barbieri	Italy	28.31	
2nd place, silver medalist(s)	6	Sanja Jovanović	Croatia	28.31	
4	3	Jenny Mensing	Germany	28.36	
5	7	Carlotta Zofkova	Italy	28.72	
6	2	Simona Baumrtová	Czech Republic	28.75	
7	1	Klaudia Nazieblo	Poland	28.93	
8	8	Ekaterina Avramova	Bulgaria	29.09	
