= Swimming at the 2015 World Aquatics Championships – Women's 50 metre backstroke =

Women's 50 metre backstroke at the 2015 World Aquatics Championships
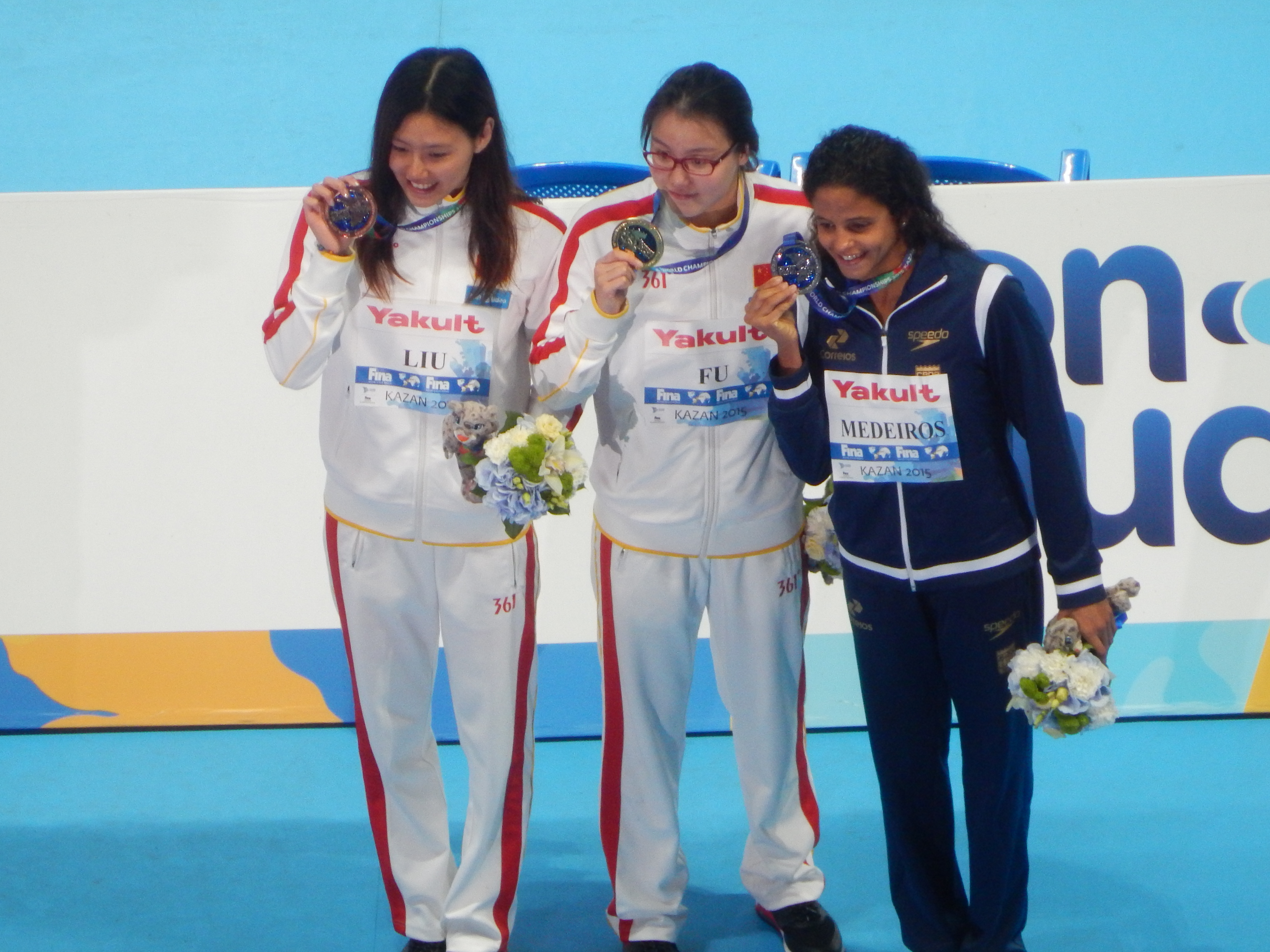
- Victory Ceremony
- Dates: 5 August (heats and semifinals); 6 August (final)
- Competitors: 53 from 48 nations
- Winning time: 27.11

Medalists
gold medal	Fu Yuanhui	China
silver medal	Etiene Medeiros	Brazil
bronze medal	Liu Xiang	China

The Women's 50 metre backstroke competition of the swimming events at the 2015 World Aquatics Championships was held on 5 August with the heats and the semifinals and 6 August with the final.

== Records ==
Prior to the competition, the existing world and championship records were as follows.

World record	Zhao Jing (CHN)	27.06	Rome, Italy	30 July 2009
Competition record	Zhao Jing (CHN)	27.06	Rome, Italy	30 July 2009

== Results ==
=== Heats ===
The heats were held on 5 August at 09:30.

Rank	Heat	Lane	Name	Nationality	Time	Notes
1	4	4	Fu Yuanhui	China	27.66	Q
2	6	4	Etiene Medeiros	Brazil	27.74	Q
3	5	4	Emily Seebohm	Australia	27.75	Q
4	5	5	Liu Xiang	China	27.79	Q
5	4	5	Mie Nielsen	Denmark	27.89	Q
6	6	5	Lauren Quigley	Great Britain	27.94	Q
7	4	6	Béryl Gastaldello	France	28.02	Q, NR
7	6	3	Madison Wilson	Australia	28.02	Q
9	5	6	Kirsty Coventry	Zimbabwe	28.15	Q
9	6	2	Anastasia Fesikova	Russia	28.15	Q
11	6	6	Elena Gemo	Italy	28.18	Q
12	6	0	Theodora Drakou	Greece	28.35	Q
13	4	7	Aleksandra Urbańczyk	Poland	28.36	Q
14	6	8	Sanja Jovanović	Croatia	28.40	Q
15	6	1	Mathilde Cini	France	28.46	Q
16	5	2	Daria Ustinova	Russia	28.52	Q
17	5	8	Sviatlana Khakhlova	Belarus	28.62	
18	5	0	Katarína Listopadová	Slovakia	28.63	
19	5	9	Dominique Bouchard	Canada	28.66	
20	5	3	Yekaterina Rudenko	Kazakhstan	28.67	
20	5	1	Simona Baumrtová	Czech Republic	28.67	
22	6	9	Stephanie Au	Hong Kong	28.70	
23	4	0	Eygló Ósk Gústafsdóttir	Iceland	28.75	
24	5	7	Park Han-byeol	South Korea	28.85	
25	6	7	Maaike de Waard	Netherlands	28.86	
26	4	1	Alicja Tchórz	Poland	28.87	
27	3	5	Gisela Morales	Guatemala	28.94	
28	4	8	Daryna Zevina	Ukraine	28.97	
29	4	9	Bobbie Gichard	New Zealand	29.15	
30	3	4	Magdalena Kuras	Sweden	29.33	
31	2	5	Naomi Ruele	Botswana	29.36	
32	3	6	Yulduz Kuchkarova	Uzbekistan	29.37	
33	3	3	Amit Ivry	Israel	29.50	
34	3	2	Ekaterina Avramova	Turkey	29.60	
35	3	0	Carolina Colorado Henao	Colombia	29.61	
36	3	7	Sigrid Sepp	Estonia	29.95	
37	3	9	Chan Caroline Zi Xin	Malaysia	30.14	
38	2	4	Jessika Cossa	Mozambique	30.17	
39	3	1	Anak Ratih	Indonesia	30.33	
40	2	3	Ariel Weech	Bahamas	30.77	
41	2	2	Monica Ramírez	Andorra	30.89	
42	3	8	Andrea García	Mexico	30.94	
43	2	7	Evelina Afoa	Samoa	31.74	
44	2	6	Lauren Hew	Cayman Islands	32.33	
45	2	1	Colleen Furgeson	Marshall Islands	33.04	
46	2	0	Rita Zeqiri	Kosovo	33.65	
47	2	8	Rahaf Baqleh	Jordan	33.67	
48	2	9	Debra Daniel	Federated States of Micronesia	33.75	
49	1	4	Yesui Bayar	Mongolia	35.44	
50	1	5	Anastasiya Tyurina	Tajikistan	38.48	
51	1	3	Tayamika Chang'Anamuno	Malawi	38.81	
52	1	6	Fatema Abdulmohsen	Bahrain	40.40	
	4	2	Mimosa Jallow	Finland	DSQ	
	4	3	Rachel Bootsma	United States	DNS	

=== Semifinals ===
The semifinals were held at 17:42.

==== Semifinal 1 ====
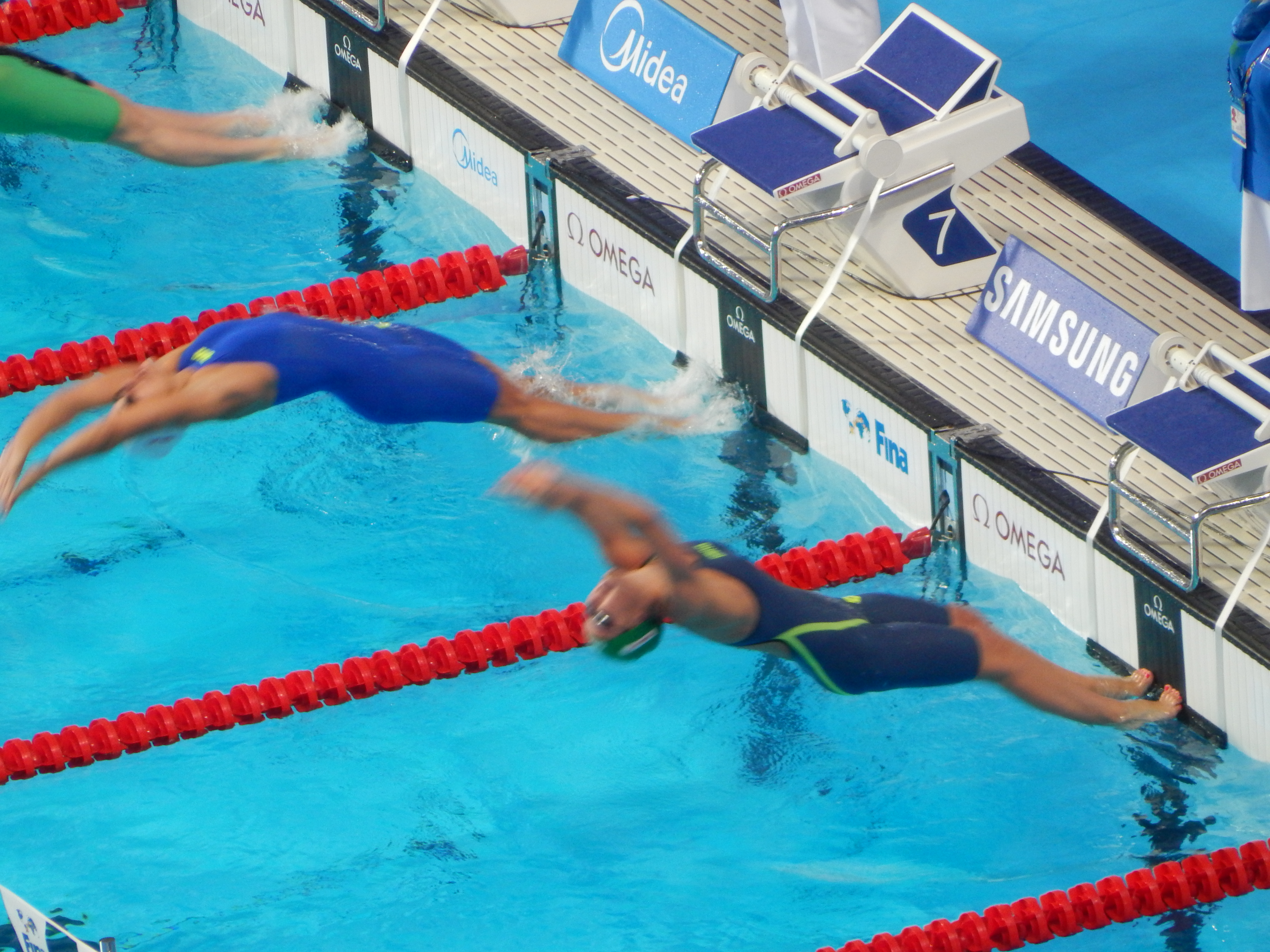
Start of first semifinal

Rank	Lane	Name	Nationality	Time	Notes
1	4	Etiene Medeiros	Brazil	27.41	Q
2	5	Liu Xiang	China	27.67	Q
3	6	Madison Wilson	Australia	27.83	Q
4	3	Lauren Quigley	Great Britain	27.88	Q
5	7	Theodora Drakou	Greece	28.01	Q, NR
6	2	Anastasia Fesikova	Russia	28.11	
7	8	Daria Ustinova	Russia	28.39	
8	1	Sanja Jovanović	Croatia	28.59	

==== Semifinal 2 ====
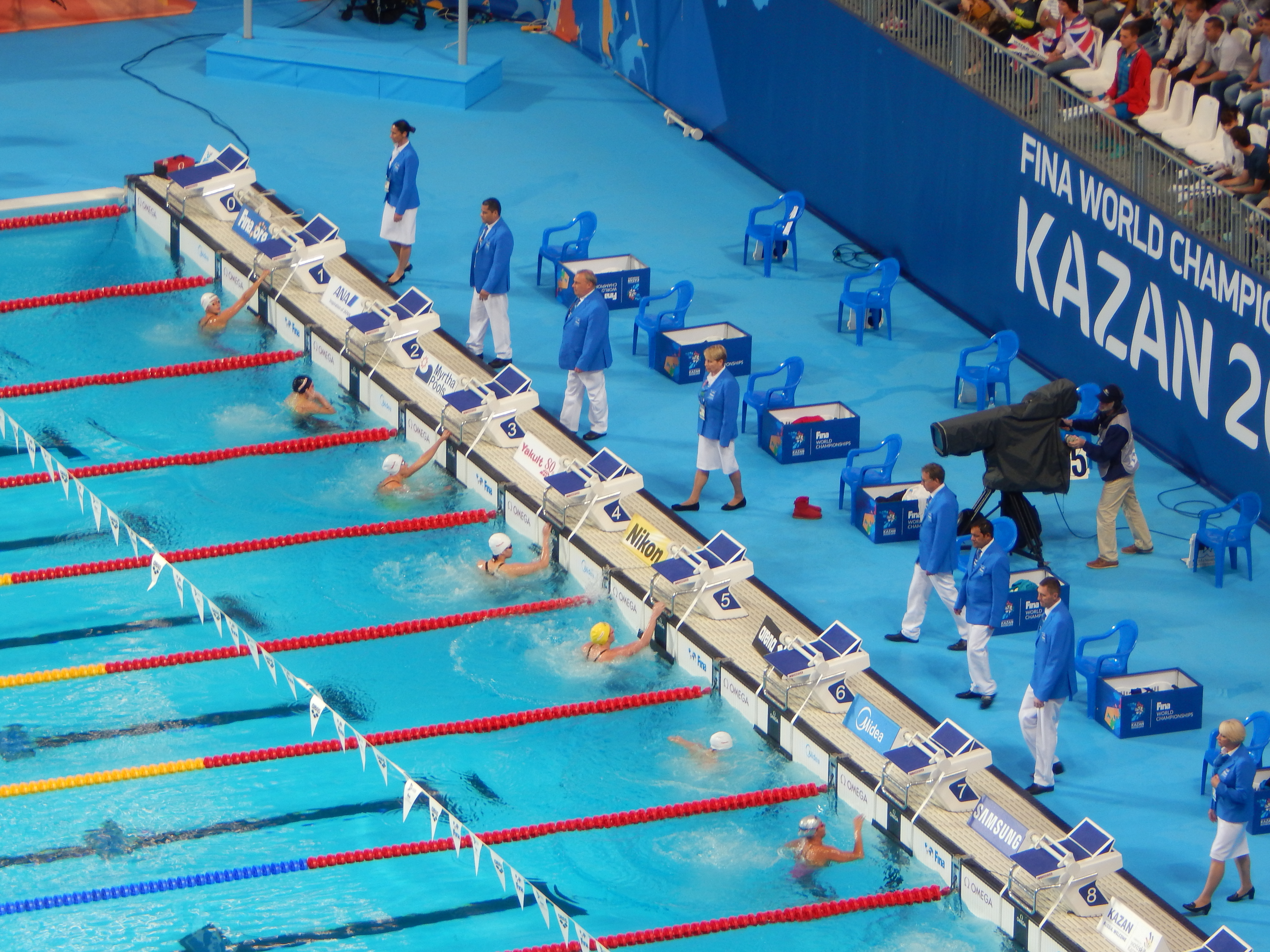
Second semifinal

Rank	Lane	Name	Nationality	Time	Notes
1	4	Fu Yuanhui	China	27.18	Q
2	3	Mie Nielsen	Denmark	27.63	Q, NR
3	5	Emily Seebohm	Australia	27.70	Q
4	8	Mathilde Cini	France	28.16	
5	7	Elena Gemo	Italy	28.21	
6	2	Kirsty Coventry	Zimbabwe	28.28	
7	6	Béryl Gastaldello	France	28.30	
8	1	Aleksandra Urbańczyk	Poland	28.46	

=== Final ===
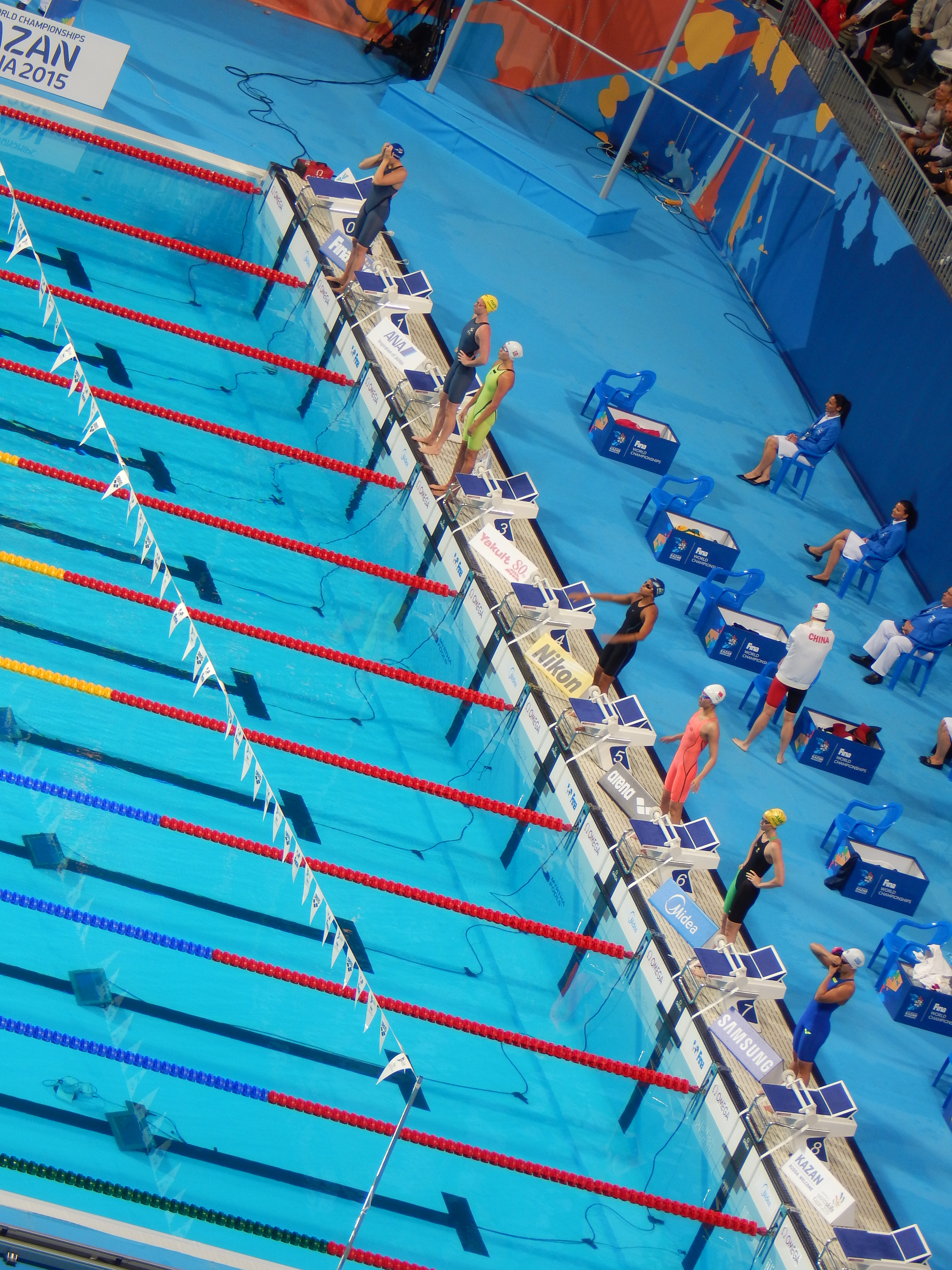
Final heat

The final was held at 18:49.

Rank	Lane	Name	Nationality	Time	Notes
1st place, gold medalist(s)	4	Fu Yuanhui	China	27.11	
2nd place, silver medalist(s)	5	Etiene Medeiros	Brazil	27.26	AM
3rd place, bronze medalist(s)	6	Liu Xiang	China	27.58	
4	2	Emily Seebohm	Australia	27.66	
5	3	Mie Nielsen	Denmark	27.73	
6	7	Madison Wilson	Australia	27.92	
7	1	Lauren Quigley	Great Britain	27.99	
8	8	Theodora Drakou	Greece	28.17	
