= Swimming at the 2018 European Aquatics Championships – Women's 100 metre backstroke =

Women's 100 metre backstroke at the 2018 European Aquatics Championships
- Venue: Tollcross International Swimming Centre
- Dates: 6 August (heats and semifinals); 7 August (final)
- Competitors: 47 from 25 nations
- Winning time: 59.19

Medalists
| gold medal | Anastasia Fesikova | Russia |
| silver medal | Georgia Davies | Great Britain |
| bronze medal | Carlotta Zofkova | Italy |

The Women's 100 metre backstroke competition of the 2018 European Aquatics Championships was held on 6 and 7 August 2018.

== Records ==
Prior to the competition, the existing world and championship records were as follows.

| | Name | Nation | Time | Location | Date |
|---|---|---|---|---|---|
| World record | Kathleen Baker | United States | 58.00 | Irvine | 28 July 2018 |
| European record | Gemma Spofforth | Great Britain | 58.12 | Rome | 28 July 2009 |
| Championship record | Mie Østergaard Nielsen | Denmark | 58.73 | London | 19 May 2016 |

== Results ==
=== Heats ===
The heats were started on 6 August at 10:22.

| Rank | Heat | Lane | Name | Nationality | Time | Notes |
|---|---|---|---|---|---|---|
| 1 | 5 | 3 | Margherita Panziera | Italy | 59.86 | Q |
| 2 | 4 | 4 | Anastasia Zuyeva | Russia | 59.87 | Q |
| 3 | 5 | 5 | Mie Nielsen | Denmark | 59.99 | Q |
| 4 | 5 | 6 | Georgia Davies | Great Britain | 1:00.03 | Q |
| 5 | 3 | 6 | Carlotta Zofkova | Italy | 1:00.07 | Q |
| 6 | 3 | 3 | Kira Toussaint | Netherlands | 1:00.12 | Q |
| 7 | 5 | 4 | Katinka Hosszú | Hungary | 1:00.15 | Q |
| 8 | 5 | 7 | Katalin Burián | Hungary | 1:00.28 | Q |
| 8 | 4 | 1 | Mimosa Jallow | Finland | 1:00.28 | Q |
| 10 | 3 | 5 | Simona Baumrtová | Czech Republic | 1:00.29 | Q |
| 11 | 4 | 3 | Kathleen Dawson | Great Britain | 1:00.30 | Q |
| 12 | 4 | 6 | Mathilde Cini | France | 1:00.55 | Q |
| 13 | 3 | 4 | Daria Ustinova | Russia | 1:00.67 | Q |
| 14 | 5 | 2 | Laura Riedemann | Germany | 1:00.77 | Q |
| 15 | 3 | 7 | Tessa Vermeulen | Netherlands | 1:00.79 | Q |
| 16 | 5 | 1 | Silvia Scalia | Italy | 1:00.92 | |
| 17 | 4 | 5 | Polina Egorova | Russia | 1:01.05 | |
| 18 | 3 | 2 | Anastasiia Avdeeva | Russia | 1:01.17 | |
| 19 | 5 | 8 | Theodora Drakou | Greece | 1:01.18 | Q |
| 20 | 3 | 1 | Duane Da Rocha | Spain | 1:01.36 | |
| 20 | 4 | 7 | Cassie Wild | Great Britain | 1:01.36 | |
| 22 | 4 | 2 | Lisa Graf | Germany | 1:01.67 | |
| 23 | 2 | 3 | Caroline Pilhatsch | Austria | 1:01.73 | |
| 24 | 2 | 5 | Nina Kost | Switzerland | 1:01.85 | |
| 25 | 2 | 4 | Julie Kepp Jensen | Denmark | 1:01.87 | |
| 26 | 3 | 0 | Ida Lindborg | Sweden | 1:02.00 | |
| 27 | 4 | 8 | África Zamorano | Spain | 1:02.11 | |
| 28 | 4 | 0 | Ekaterina Avramova | Turkey | 1:02.12 | |
| 29 | 2 | 2 | Anika Apostalon | Czech Republic | 1:02.19 | |
| 30 | 4 | 9 | Victoria Bierre | Denmark | 1:02.55 | |
| 31 | 2 | 8 | Cristina García | Spain | 1:02.84 | |
| 32 | 2 | 6 | Gabriela Georgieva | Bulgaria | 1:02.97 | |
| 33 | 2 | 1 | Shahar Menahem | Israel | 1:03.15 | |
| 34 | 5 | 9 | Agata Naskręt | Poland | 1:03.28 | |
| 35 | 2 | 0 | Signhild Joensen | Faroe Islands | 1:03.30 | |
| 36 | 1 | 4 | Lena Grabowski | Austria | 1:03.36 | |
| 37 | 3 | 9 | Karolina Hájková | Slovakia | 1:03.48 | |
| 38 | 1 | 3 | Elçin Türkmenoğlu | Turkey | 1:03.65 | |
| 39 | 1 | 7 | Margaret Markvardt | Estonia | 1:03.77 | |
| 40 | 3 | 8 | Eygló Ósk Gústafsdóttir | Iceland | 1:03.82 | |
| 41 | 1 | 2 | Aviv Barzelay | Israel | 1:04.01 | |
| 42 | 1 | 5 | Vilma Ruotsalainen | Finland | 1:04.41 | |
| 43 | 1 | 6 | Weronika Górecka | Poland | 1:04.82 | |
| 44 | 1 | 1 | Sezin Eliguel | Turkey | 1:04.85 | |
| 45 | 1 | 8 | Fjorda Shabani | Kosovo | 1:05.87 | |
| 46 | 2 | 9 | Arina Baikova | Latvia | 1:06.63 | |
| 47 | 1 | 0 | Eda Zeqiri | Kosovo | 1:09.75 | |
| — | 2 | 7 | Jenna Laukkanen | Finland | Did not start | |
| — | 5 | 0 | Alicja Tchórz | Poland | Did not start | |

=== Semifinals ===
The semifinals were started on 6 August at 17:13.

==== Semifinal 1 ====
| Rank | Lane | Name | Nationality | Time | Notes |
|---|---|---|---|---|---|
| 1 | 4 | Anastasia Zuyeva | Russia | 59.38 | Q |
| 2 | 5 | Georgia Davies | Great Britain | 59.97 | Q |
| 3 | 3 | Kira Toussaint | Netherlands | 1:00.02 | Q |
| 4 | 7 | Mathilde Cini | France | 1:00.18 | |
| 5 | 2 | Simona Baumrtová | Czech Republic | 1:00.49 | |
| 6 | 1 | Laura Riedemann | Germany | 1:00.53 | |
| 7 | 6 | Mimosa Jallow | Finland | 1:00.83 | |
| 8 | 8 | Theodora Drakou | Greece | 1:01.82 | |

==== Semifinal 2 ====
| Rank | Lane | Name | Nationality | Time | Notes |
|---|---|---|---|---|---|
| 1 | 6 | Katinka Hosszú | Hungary | 59.67 | Q |
| 2 | 3 | Carlotta Zofkova | Italy | 59.88 | Q |
| 3 | 5 | Mie Nielsen | Denmark | 59.89 | Q |
| 4 | 4 | Margherita Panziera | Italy | 59.90 | Q |
| 5 | 2 | Katalin Burián | Hungary | 1:00.01 | Q |
| 6 | 1 | Daria Ustinova | Russia | 1:00.56 | |
| 7 | 7 | Kathleen Dawson | Great Britain | 1:00.57 | |
| 8 | 8 | Tessa Vermeulen | Netherlands | 1:00.98 | |

=== Final ===
The final was started on 7 August at 16:55.

| Rank | Lane | Name | Nationality | Time | Notes |
|---|---|---|---|---|---|
| 1st place, gold medalist(s) | 4 | Anastasia Fesikova | Russia | 59.19 | |
| 2nd place, silver medalist(s) | 7 | Georgia Davies | Great Britain | 59.36 | |
| 3rd place, bronze medalist(s) | 3 | Carlotta Zofkova | Italy | 59.61 | |
| 4 | 5 | Katinka Hosszú | Hungary | 59.64 | |
| 5 | 2 | Margherita Panziera | Italy | 59.71 | |
| 6 | 6 | Mie Nielsen | Denmark | 59.93 | |
| 7 | 1 | Katalin Burián | Hungary | 1:00.05 | |
| 8 | 8 | Kira Toussaint | Netherlands | 1:00.14 | |
