= 2010 FINA World Swimming Championships (25 m) – Women's 50 metre backstroke =

Women's 50m Backstroke at the 2010 Short Course Worlds
- Dates: 18 December 2010 (heats and semifinals); 19 December 2010 (final)
- Competitors: 73
- Winning time: 26.27

Medalists
gold medal	Zhao Jing	China
silver medal	Rachel Goh	Australia
bronze medal	Mercedes Peris	Spain

The Women's 50 Backstroke event at the 10th Short Course World Swimming Championships took place 18–19 December 2010 in Dubai, United Arab Emirates. The heats and semifinals were 18 December; the final was 19 December.

73 swimmers swam the event.

== Records ==
Prior to the competition, the existing world and championship records were as follows.

	Name	Nation	Time	Location	Date
World record	Sanja Jovanović	Croatia	25.70	Istanbul	12 December 2009
Championship record	Sanja Jovanović	Croatia	26.37	Manchester	13 April 2008

The following records were established during the competition:

Date	Round	Name	Nation	Time	WR	CR
18 December 2010	Semifinals	Zhao Jing	China	26.37		=CR
19 December 2010	Final	Zhao Jing	China	26.27		CR

== Results ==
=== Heats ===
Rank	Heat	Lane	Name	Time	Notes
1	9	2	Rachel Goh (AUS)	26.73	Q
2	1	3	Zhao Jing (CHN)	26.99	Q
2	10	3	Mercedes Peris (ESP)	26.99	Q
4	9	4	Aleksandra Gerasimenya (BLR)	27.02	Q
5	10	5	Anastasia Zuyeva (RUS)	27.12	Q
6	10	4	Gao Chang (CHN)	27.26	Q
7	9	5	Aleksandra Urbanczyk (POL)	27.27	Q
8	8	6	Elena Gemo (ITA)	27.39	Q
8	8	1	Chanelle van Wyk (RSA)	27.39	Q
10	8	5	Marieke Guehrer (AUS)	27.45	Q
10	9	6	Miyuki Takemura (JPN)	27.45	Q
12	7	3	Missy Franklin (USA)	27.48	Q
13	9	3	Simona Baumrtova (CZE)	27.50	Q
14	10	2	Laura Letrari (ITA)	27.55	Q
15	8	2	Fabiola Molina (BRA)	27.62	Q
16	10	1	Fabienne Nadarajah (AUT)	27.73	Q
17	10	6	Etiene Medeiros (BRA)	27.78	
18	7	2	Sinead Russell (CAN)	27.90	
19	7	6	Fernanda González (MEX)	27.96	
20	9	8	Theodora Drakou (GRE)	27.98	
21	8	3	Sanja Jovanovic (CRO)	28.03	
22	9	7	Kseniya Moskvina (RUS)	28.09	
23	7	1	Michelle Coleman (SWE)	28.27	
24	10	7	Katharina Stiberg (NOR)	28.31	
25	8	8	Ekaterina Avramova (BUL)	28.33	
26	6	4	Alana Kathryn Dillette (BAH)	28.36	
27	5	6	Madison White (USA)	28.47	
28	7	8	Hazal Sarikaya (TUR)	28.57	
29	7	4	Katarina Milly (SVK)	28.60	
30	10	8	Cecilia Bertoncello (ARG)	28.61	
31	6	1	Yulduz Kuchkarova (UZB)	28.68	
32	6	2	Jeserik Pinto (VEN)	28.84	
33	6	8	Sarah Rolko (LUX)	28.89	
34	6	6	Chen Ting (TPE)	29.01	
34	9	1	Alexianne Castel (FRA)	29.01	
36	6	5	Isabella Arcila (COL)	29.03	
37	8	7	Pernille Jessing Larsen (DEN)	29.16	
38	6	3	Kätlin Sepp (EST)	29.19	
39	5	4	Massie Milagros Carrillo (PER)	29.48	
40	6	7	Carmen Cianci (COL)	29.62	
41	7	7	Gizem Cam (TUR)	29.67	
42	5	2	Monica Ramirez (AND)	30.08	
43	5	3	Farida Osman (EGY)	30.49	
44	5	1	Nicola Muscat (MLT)	30.56	
45	4	3	Lara Butler (CAY)	30.59	
46	4	4	Sara Hyajna (JOR)	30.74	
47	5	8	Silvie Ketelaars (AHO)	30.92	
48	5	7	Vong Erica Man Wai (MAC)	30.98	
49	4	5	Iulia Olari (MDA)	31.31	
50	4	7	Karen Torrez (BOL)	31.44	NR
51	3	3	Jade Howard (ZAM)	31.48	
52	4	2	Dalia Torrez (NCA)	31.82	
53	4	1	Sylvia Brunlehner (KEN)	32.01	
54	4	6	Karen Vilorio (HON)	32.14	
55	4	8	Rachel Fortunato (GIB)	32.43	
56	3	4	Talisa Lanoe (KEN)	32.63	
57	3	7	Kiran Khan (PAK)	32.72	
58	3	6	Estellah Fils Rabetsara (MAD)	32.76	
59	1	4	Cheyenne Rova (FIJ)	32.97	
60	3	5	Lou Wai Sam (MAC)	32.99	
61	2	7	Debra Daniel (FSM)	33.94	
62	3	1	Mariam Foum (TAN)	35.40	
63	2	4	Mahnoor Maqsood (PAK)	35.72	
64	2	5	Osisang Chilton (PLW)	35.85	
65	3	8	Ann-Marie Hepler (MHL)	36.04	
66	2	6	Keanna Villagomez (NMI)	36.72	
67	3	2	Britany van Lange (GUY)	36.91	
68	1	5	Ophelia Swyne (GHA)	36.99	
69	2	3	Shaila Rana (NEP)	37.43	
70	2	2	Yanet Seyoum (ETH)	37.77	
-	5	5	Sharon van Rouwendaal (NED)	DNS	
-	7	5	Genevieve Saumur (CAN)	DNS	
-	8	4	Hinkelien Schreuder (NED)	DNS	

=== Semifinals ===
==== Semifinal 1 ====
Rank	Lane	Name	Time	Notes
1	4	Zhao Jing (CHN)	26.37	Q, =CR
2	5	Aleksandra Gerasimenya (BLR)	26.77	Q
3	3	Gao Chang (CHN)	27.11	Q
3	2	Marieke Guehrer (AUS)	27.17	
5	6	Elena Gemo (ITA)	27.19	
6	8	Fabienne Nadarajah (AUT)	27.48	
6	7	Missy Franklin (USA)	27.49	
8	1	Laura Letrari (ITA)	27.54	

==== Semifinal 2 ====
Rank	Lane	Name	Time	Notes
1	4	Rachel Goh (AUS)	26.68	Q
2	5	Mercedes Peris (ESP)	26.92	Q
3	3	Anastasia Zuyeva (RUS)	27.09	Q
4	7	Miyuki Takemura (JPN)	27.10	Q
5	8	Fabiola Molina (BRA)	27.13	Q
6	2	Chanelle van Wyk (RSA)	27.27	
7	1	Simona Baumrtova (CZE)	27.33	
8	6	Aleksandra Urbańczyk (POL)	27.65	

=== Final ===
Rank	Lane	Name	Time	Notes
1st place, gold medalist(s)	4	Zhao Jing (CHN)	26.27	CR
2nd place, silver medalist(s)	5	Rachel Goh (AUS)	26.54	
3rd place, bronze medalist(s)	6	Mercedes Peris (ESP)	26.80	
4	7	Miyuki Takemura (JPN)	26.91	
5	1	Gao Chang (CHN)	27.00	
6	2	Anastasia Zuyeva (RUS)	27.01	
7	3	Aleksandra Gerasimenya (BLR)	27.02	
8	8	Fabiola Molina (BRA)	27.67	
