= Swimming at the 2016 Summer Olympics – Women's 4 × 100 metre medley relay =

Women's 4 × 100 metre medley relay at the Games of the XXXI Olympiad
- Venue: Olympic Aquatics Stadium
- Dates: 12 August 2016 (heats); 13 August 2016 (final)
- Competitors: 76 from 16 nations
- Teams: 16
- Winning time: 3:53.13

Medalists
1st place, gold medalist(s)		Kathleen Baker, Lilly King, Dana Vollmer, Simone Manuel, Olivia Smoliga*, Katie Meili*, Kelsi Worrell*, Abbey Weitzeil*	United States
2nd place, silver medalist(s)		Emily Seebohm, Taylor McKeown, Emma McKeon, Cate Campbell, Madison Wilson*, Madeline Groves*, Brittany Elmslie*	Australia
3rd place, bronze medalist(s)		Mie Nielsen, Rikke Møller Pedersen, Jeanette Ottesen, Pernille Blume; *Indicates the swimmer only competed in the preliminary heats.	Denmark

The women's 4 × 100 metre medley relay event at the 2016 Summer Olympics took place on 12–13 August at the Olympic Aquatics Stadium in Rio de Janeiro. By winning gold, the U.S. women brought home America's 1000th gold medal in the nation's Summer Olympics history.

== Summary ==
The U.S. women's team outlasted the rest of the field to solidify its Olympic title defense in the medley relay final with the help of a freestyle anchor leg from Simone Manuel. Leading from the start, the foursome of Kathleen Baker (59.00), Lilly King (1:05.70), Dana Vollmer (56.00), and Manuel (52.43) put together a perfect ending with a final time of 3:53.13 to give the Americans their tenth gold medal in this event, and their thousandth overall in Summer Olympic history.

Australia's Emily Seebohm (58.83), Taylor McKeown (1:07.05), and Emma McKeon (56.95) struggled to hold on their momentum throughout the race, until Cate Campbell jumped into the pool at the final exchange. Then, Campbell produced a freestyle anchor split of 52.17 to deliver the Australian relay team a silver medal in 3:55.00. After winning the 50 m freestyle title an hour earlier, anchor Pernille Blume (53.21) helped her fellow Danish swimmers Mie Nielsen (58.75), Rikke Møller Pedersen (1:06.62), and Jeanette Ottesen (56.43) shatter the European record for the bronze in 3:55.01, a hundredth of a second behind Australia.

China's Fu Yuanhui (59.53), Shi Jinglin (1:06.00), Lu Ying (56.49), and Zhu Menghui (53.16) slipped off the podium to fourth in 3:55.18, while the Canadian combination of Kylie Masse (58.77), Rachel Nicol (1:06.81), Penny Oleksiak (56.75), and Chantal van Landeghem (53.16) established a national record of 3:55.49 to take the fifth spot. Russia's Anastasia Fesikova (59.49), Yuliya Yefimova (1:04.98), Svetlana Chimrova (57.54), and Veronika Popova (53.65) finished sixth with a 3:55.66, holding off the British quartet of Georgia Davies (59.43), Chloe Tutton (1:06.43), Siobhan-Marie O’Connor (57.47), and Francesca Halsall (53.63) by 1.3 seconds, a seventh-place time in 3:56.96. Meanwhile, Italy (3:59.50), anchored by freestyle swimmer and four-time Olympian Federica Pellegrini, rounded out the championship field.

== Records ==
Prior to this competition, the existing world and Olympic records were as follows.

World record	United States (USA); Missy Franklin (58.50); Rebecca Soni (1:04.82); Dana Vollmer (55.48); Allison Schmitt (53.25)	3:52.05	London, United Kingdom	4 August 2012
Olympic record	United States; Missy Franklin (58.50); Rebecca Soni (1:04.82); Dana Vollmer (55.48); Allison Schmitt (53.25)	3:52.05	London, United Kingdom	4 August 2012

== Competition format ==
The competition consisted of two rounds: heats and a final. The relay teams with the best 8 times in the heats advanced to the final. Swim-offs were used as necessary to break ties for advancement to the next round.

== Results ==
=== Heats ===
A total of sixteen countries have qualified to participate. The best eight from two heats advanced to the final.

Rank	Heat	Lane	Nation	Swimmers	Time	Notes
1	2	5	United States	Olivia Smoliga (59.57); Katie Meili (1:04.93); Kelsi Worrell (56.47); Abbey Weitzeil (53.70)	3:54.67	Q
2	1	3	Canada	Kylie Masse (58.66) NR; Rachel Nicol (1:06.97); Noemie Thomas (57.66); Taylor Ruck (53.51)	3:56.80	Q, NR
3	1	5	Denmark	Mie Nielsen (59.48); Rikke Møller Pedersen (1:06.88); Jeanette Ottesen (57.38); Pernille Blume (53.24)	3:56.98	Q
4	1	2	Russia	Anastasia Fesikova (1:00.16); Yulia Efimova (1:05.78); Svetlana Chimrova (57.65); Veronika Popova (53.85)	3:57.44	Q
5	2	3	Australia	Madison Wilson (59.38); Taylor McKeown (1:07.48); Madeline Groves (57.87); Brittany Elmslie (53.07)	3:57.80	Q
6	2	4	China	Fu Yuanhui (59.20); Zhang Xinyu (1:07.86); Lu Ying (57.45); Shen Duo (53.72)	3:58.23	Q
7	2	2	Italy	Carlotta Zofkova (1:01.42); Arianna Castiglioni (1:06.33); Ilaria Bianchi (57.76); Federica Pellegrini (53.58)	3:59.09	Q
8	2	6	Great Britain	Georgia Davies (59.35); Chloe Tutton (1:07.25); Siobhan-Marie O’Connor (57.61); Georgia Coates (55.13)	3:59.34	Q
9	1	4	Sweden	Michelle Coleman (1:01.13); Jennie Johansson (1:06.62); Sarah Sjöström (56.70); Louise Hansson (55.00)	3:59.45	
10	1	6	Japan	Natsumi Sakai (1:01.57); Satomi Suzuki (1:07.40); Rikako Ikee (56.73); Miki Uchida (54.12)	3:59.82	
11	1	7	Finland	Mimosa Jallow (1:01.03); Jenna Laukkanen (1:06.49); Emilia Pikkarainen (59.02); Hanna-Maria Seppälä (55.07)	4:01.61	
12	2	7	Germany	Jenny Mensing (1:01.27); Vanessa Grimberg (1:07.99); Alexandra Wenk (58.55); Annika Bruhn (54.38)	4:02.19	
13	1	1	Brazil	Natalia de Luccas (1:01.93); Jhennifer da Conceição (1:08.23); Daynara de Paula (58.18); Larissa Oliveira (54.49)	4:02.83	
14	1	8	Hong Kong	Stephanie Au (1:01.55); Yvette Kong (1:08.39); Sze Hang Yu (59.54); Camille Cheng (54.37)	4:03.85	
	2	1	France	Béryl Gastaldello (1:00.60); Fanny Deberghes (1:08.83); Marie Wattel; Charlotte Bonnet	DSQ	
	2	8	Czech Republic	Simona Baumrtová (1:01.27); Martina Moravčíková; Lucie Svěcená; Barbora Seemanová	DSQ	

=== Final ===
Rank	Lane	Nation	Swimmers	Time	Notes
1st place, gold medalist(s)	4	United States	Kathleen Baker (59.00); Lilly King (1:05.70); Dana Vollmer (56.00); Simone Manuel (52.43)	3:53.13	
2nd place, silver medalist(s)	2	Australia	Emily Seebohm (58.83); Taylor McKeown (1:07.05); Emma McKeon (56.95); Cate Campbell (52.17)	3:55.00	
3rd place, bronze medalist(s)	3	Denmark	Mie Nielsen (58.75); Rikke Møller Pedersen (1:06.62); Jeanette Ottesen (56.43); Pernille Blume (53.21)	3:55.01	ER
4	7	China	Fu Yuanhui (59.53); Shi Jinglin (1:06.00); Lu Ying (56.49); Zhu Menghui (53.16)	3:55.18	
5	5	Canada	Kylie Masse (58.77); Rachel Nicol (1:06.81); Penny Oleksiak (56.75); Chantal van Landeghem (53.16)	3:55.49	NR
6	6	Russia	Anastasia Fesikova (59.49); Yulia Efimova (1:04.98); Svetlana Chimrova (57.54); Veronika Popova (53.65)	3:55.66	NR
7	8	Great Britain	Georgia Davies (59.43); Chloe Tutton (1:06.43); Siobhan-Marie O’Connor (57.47); Francesca Halsall (53.63)	3:56.96	NR
8	1	Italy	Carlotta Zofkova (1:01.29); Arianna Castiglioni (1:06.65); Ilaria Bianchi (58.21); Federica Pellegrini (53.35)	3:59.50	
