= Swimming at the 2018 European Aquatics Championships – Women's 4 × 100 metre medley relay =

Women's 4 × 100 metre medley relay at the 2018 European Aquatics Championships
- Venue: Tollcross International Swimming Centre
- Dates: 9 August
- Competitors: 72 from 16 nations
- Teams: 16
- Winning time: 3:54.22

Medalists
| gold medal | Anastasia Fesikova; Yuliya Yefimova; Svetlana Chimrova; Maria Kameneva; Daria Ustinova; Vitalina Simonova; Arina Openysheva | Russia |
| silver medal | Mie Nielsen; Rikke Møller Pedersen; Emilie Beckmann; Pernille Blume | Denmark |
| bronze medal | Georgia Davies; Siobhan-Marie O'Connor; Alys Thomas; Freya Anderson; Kathleen Dawson | Great Britain |

The Women's 4 × 100 metre medley relay competition of the 2018 European Aquatics Championships was held on 9 August 2018.

== Records ==
Before the competition, the existing world and championship records were as follows.

| | Team | Time | Location | Date |
|---|---|---|---|---|
| World record | United States | 3:51.55 | Budapest | 30 July 2017 |
| European record | Russia | 3:53.38 | Budapest | 30 July 2017 |
| Championship record | Denmark | 3:55.62 | Berlin | 24 August 2014 |

The following new records were set during this competition.

| Date | Event | Nation | Time | Record |
|---|---|---|---|---|
| 9 August | Final | Russia | 3:54.22 | CR |

== Results ==
=== Heats ===
The heats were started at 10:05.

| Rank | Heat | Lane | Nation | Swimmers | Time | Notes |
|---|---|---|---|---|---|---|
| 1 | 1 | 3 | Denmark | Mie Nielsen (59.95); Rikke Møller Pedersen (1:07.70); Emilie Beckmann (58.48); Pernille Blume (52.27) | 3:58.40 | Q |
| 2 | 1 | 6 | Great Britain | Kathleen Dawson (1:00.17); Siobhan-Marie O'Connor (1:06.74); Alys Thomas (58.44); Freya Anderson (54.63) | 3:59.98 | Q |
| 3 | 2 | 7 | Italy | Carlotta Zofkova (1:00.22); Martina Carraro (1:07.92); Ilaria Bianchi (57.79); Giada Galizi (54.59) | 4:00.52 | Q |
| 4 | 1 | 1 | Netherlands | Kira Toussaint (1:00.13); Tes Schouten (1:08.63); Kinge Zandringa (59.51); Femke Heemskerk (53.23) | 4:01.50 | Q |
| 5 | 1 | 8 | France | Mathilde Cini (1:00.79); Fanny Deberghes (1:08.06); Marie Wattel (58.96); Charlotte Bonnet (53.71) | 4:01.52 | Q |
| 6 | 2 | 8 | Russia | Daria Ustinova (1:01.23); Vitalina Simonova (1:08.61); Svetlana Chimrova (57.86); Arina Openysheva (54.44) | 4:02.14 | Q |
| 7 | 1 | 5 | Germany | Laura Riedemann (1:00.65); Jessica Steiger (1:08.71); Franziska Hentke (58.89); Annika Bruhn (54.15) | 4:02.40 | Q |
| 8 | 2 | 5 | Hungary | Katinka Hosszú (1:01.01); Anna Sztankovics (1:08.50); Liliána Szilágyi (59.02); Evelyn Verrasztó (55.39) | 4:03.92 | Q |
| 9 | 1 | 4 | Sweden | Ida Lindborg (1:01.71); Sophie Hansson (1:08.18); Louise Hansson (58.19); Magdalena Kuras (55.86) | 4:03.94 | |
| 10 | 1 | 2 | Switzerland | Nina Kost (1:02.00); Lisa Mamié (1:08.73); Svenja Stoffel (1:00.29); Maria Ugolkova (53.36) | 4:04.38 | |
| 11 | 2 | 4 | Poland | Alicja Tchórz (1:01.53); Weronika Hallmann (1:09.09); Anna Dowgiert (59.21); Katarzyna Wasick (54.66) | 4:04.49 | |
| 12 | 2 | 1 | Spain | Duane Da Rocha (1:01.44); Jessica Vall (1:07.16); Lidón Muñoz (1:00.99); Melani Costa (55.20) | 4:04.79 | |
| 13 | 2 | 2 | Israel | Shahar Menahem (1:03.44); Anastasia Gorbenko (1:10.86); Amit Ivry (58.78); Andrea Murez (54.10) | 4:07.18 | |
| 14 | 1 | 7 | Turkey | Ekaterina Avramova (1:03.02); Viktoriya Zeynep Güneş (1:10.59); Aleyna Özkan (1:01.29); Selen Özbilen (56.09) | 4:10.99 | |
| 15 | 2 | 6 | Austria | Caroline Pilhatsch (1:01.89); Elena Guttmann (1:12.63); Lena Kreundl (1:01.38); Cornelia Pammer (57.98) | 4:13.88 | |
| 16 | 2 | 3 | Slovakia | Karolina Hájková (1:03.37); Nikoleta Trníková (1:13.15); Andrea Podmaníková (1:03.39); Laura Benková (57.73) | 4:17.64 | |
| | 2 | 0 | Finland | Did not start | | |

=== Final ===
The final was held at 18:07.

| Rank | Lane | Nation | Swimmers | Time | Notes |
|---|---|---|---|---|---|
| 1st place, gold medalist(s) | 7 | Russia | Anastasia Fesikova (59.56); Yuliya Yefimova (1:03.95); Svetlana Chimrova (57.34); Maria Kameneva (53.37) | 3:54.22 | CR |
| 2nd place, silver medalist(s) | 4 | Denmark | Mie Nielsen (59.76); Rikke Møller Pedersen (1:07.50); Emilie Beckmann (57.66); Pernille Blume (51.77) | 3:56.69 | |
| 3rd place, bronze medalist(s) | 5 | Great Britain | Georgia Davies (59.44); Siobhan-Marie O'Connor (1:07.22); Alys Thomas (57.56); Freya Anderson (52.69) | 3:56.91 | |
| 4 | 3 | Italy | Carlotta Zofkova (59.86); Arianna Castiglioni (1:06.50); Elena Di Liddo (57.34); Federica Pellegrini (53.30) | 3:57.00 | |
| 5 | 6 | Netherlands | Kira Toussaint (59.81); Tes Schouten (1:08.05); Kinge Zandringa (58.24); Femke Heemskerk (52.84) | 3:58.94 | |
| 6 | 2 | France | Mathilde Cini (1:01.00); Fanny Deberghes (1:07.46); Marie Wattel (58.54); Charlotte Bonnet (52.85) | 3:59.85 | |
| 7 | 1 | Germany | Laura Riedemann (1:00.58); Jessica Steiger (1:08.38); Aliena Schmidtke (58.29); Annika Bruhn (53.85) | 4:01.10 | |
| 8 | 8 | Hungary | Katinka Hosszú (1:00.93); Anna Sztankovics (1:08.78); Liliána Szilágyi (58.71); Evelyn Verrasztó (56.16) | 4:04.58 | |
