= Povázsay =

Povázsay is a surname. Notable people with the surname include:

- Eszter Povázsay (born 1990), Hungarian swimmer
- Péter Povázsay (1946–2024), Hungarian canoeist
