= Eszter Povázsay =

Hungarian swimmer (born 1990)

Personal information
- Nationality: Hungary
- Born: 14 November 1990 (age 35) Budapest, Hungary
- Height: 1.83 m (6 ft 0 in)
- Weight: 74 kg (163 lb)

Sport
- Sport: Swimming
- Strokes: Backstroke
- College team: Louisville Cardinals (USA)
- Coach: Arthur Albiero (Louisville)

Eszter Povázsay (born 14 November 1990 in Budapest) is a Hungarian swimmer, who specialized in backstroke events. She is a five-time All-Big East performer, a varsity swimmer for the Louisville Cardinals, and a marketing student at the University of Louisville in Louisville, Kentucky.

Povázsay attended and swam for the University of Louisville under Head Coach Arthur Albiero.

== 2012 Olympics ==
Povazsay qualified for the women's 100 m backstroke at the 2012 Summer Olympics in London by clearing a FINA B-standard entry time of 1:02.38 at the European Championships in Debrecen. She challenged seven other swimmers on the second heat, including three-time Olympians Anja Čarman of Slovenia and Sanja Jovanović of Croatia. She was faster than Kazakhstan's Yekaterina Rudenko to grab a sixth spot by 0.09 of a second in 1:03.55. Povazsay failed to advance into the semifinals, as she placed thirty-seventh overall in the preliminaries.
