= Laura Riedemann =

German swimmer

Personal information
- Nationality: German
- Born: 29 May 1998 (age 28) Halle (Saale), Germany

Sport
- Sport: Swimming

Laura Riedemann (born 29 May 1998) is a German swimmer. She competed in the women's 100 metre backstroke at the 2019 World Aquatics Championships. She qualified to represent Germany at the 2020 Summer Olympics.
