= Georgia Davies (swimmer) =

British swimmer (born 1990)

Personal information
- Full name: Georgia Beth Davies
- National team: Great Britain; Wales
- Born: 11 October 1990 (age 35) London, England
- Height: 1.75 m (5 ft 9 in)
- Weight: 60 kg (9 st 6 lb)

Sport
- Sport: Swimming
- Strokes: Backstroke
- Club: Energy Standard; Loughborough University
- Coach: James Gibson
Medal record
Women's swimming
Representing Great Britain
World Championships
Bronze medal – third place	2019 Gwangju	4×100 m mixed medley
World Championships (SC)
Bronze medal – third place	2016 Windsor	100 m backstroke
Bronze medal – third place	2018 Hangzhou	100 m backstroke
European Championships (LC)
Gold medal – first place	2016 London	4×100 m mixed medley
Gold medal – first place	2016 London	4×100 m medley
Gold medal – first place	2018 Glasgow	50 m backstroke
Gold medal – first place	2018 Glasgow	4×100 m mixed medley
Silver medal – second place	2014 Berlin	50 m backstroke
Silver medal – second place	2018 Glasgow	100 m backstroke
Bronze medal – third place	2014 Berlin	100 m backstroke
Bronze medal – third place	2014 Berlin	4x100 m medley
Bronze medal – third place	2016 London	50 m backstroke
Bronze medal – third place	2018 Glasgow	4×100 m medley
European Championships (SC)
Silver medal – second place	2011 Szczecin	50 m backstroke
Bronze medal – third place	2019 Glasgow	100 m backstroke
Representing Wales
Commonwealth Games
Gold medal – first place	2014 Glasgow	50 m backstroke
Silver medal – second place	2014 Glasgow	100 m backstroke
Bronze medal – third place	2010 Delhi	50 m backstroke
Bronze medal – third place	2018 Gold Coast	50 m backstroke
Bronze medal – third place	2018 Gold Coast	4×100 m medley

Georgia Beth Davies (born 11 October 1990) is a British competition swimmer who has represented Great Britain in the Olympic Games and European championships, and swam for Wales in the Commonwealth Games. She has won gold in the Commonwealth Games and European Championships. She currently represents Energy Standard in the International Swimming League.

== Career ==
=== Early career (2010-2012) ===
Georgia Davies made her senior breakthrough as part of the Wales team at the 2010 Commonwealth Games, entering 5 events. She won a bronze medal in the 50 metre backstroke. She also made the finals in the 100 metre backstroke, where she finished 6th, the 4x100 metre medley relay, where she finished 4th and the 4x200 metre freestyle relay, where she finished 6th. She also competed in the 200 metre freestyle, finishing 15th.

She competed for Team GB at the 2011 World Championships, where she made the final as part of the 4x100 metre medley team, eventually finishing 6th. She also competed in the 50m backstroke, finishing 10th and missing out on the final.

At the 2012 Summer Olympics, she competed in the women's 100-metre backstroke, finishing 6th in the heats. However, she was eliminated in the semifinal in 15th position.

=== Later career (2014-present) ===
Georgia Davies competed in 2 events in the 2013 World Championships, the 50 metre backstroke, where she made the final and finished 6th and the 100 metre backstroke, where she finished 19th.

In 2014, Davies won the gold medal in the 50 metre backstroke in a Games record, and silver in the 100 metre backstroke at the 2014 Commonwealth Games. A month later, she won silver in the 50m backstroke and bronze in the 100-metre backstroke and 4×100-metre medley relay at the 2014 European Championships. She won the bronze medal in the 100 metre backstroke at the 2014 World Championships (SC).

She represented Team GB again in the 2016 Summer Olympics, where she competed in the 100 metre backstroke but again went out in the semifinals, finishing 10th. She made an Olympic final as part of the 4x100 metre medley relay team, finishing 7th.

At the 2017 World Championships, Davies made finals in the 4x100 metre medley relay and 50 metre backstroke, finishing 7th and 8th respectively. She also competed in the 100 metre backstroke, finishing 10th.

Davies represented Team Wales for the third time at the 2018 Commonwealth Games and Davies returned from Australia a double bronze medallist in the 50 metre backstroke and 4x100 metre medley relay.

At the 2018 European Championships, Davies won gold in the 50 metre backstroke finishing in 27.23 seconds. She won another gold when she won as part of the team in the mixed 4 × 100m medley. She added a silver in the 100 metre backstroke, and a bronze in the women's 4 × 100 metre medley relay.

At the 2019 World Aquatics Championships held in Gwangju, South Korea, Davies won a bronze as part of the British team in the 4 × 100 m mixed medley relay.

=== International Swimming League ===
In the Autumn of 2019 she was member of the inaugural International Swimming League swimming for the Energy Standard International Swim Club, who won the team title in Las Vegas, Nevada, in December.
