= Arianna Barbieri =

Italian swimmer (born 1989)

Personal information
- Nationality: Italy
- Born: 23 February 1989 (age 37) Camposampiero, Italy

Sport
- Sport: Swimming
- Strokes: Backstroke
- Club: G.S. Fiamme Gialle
Medal record
European Championships
Silver medal – second place	2012 Debrecen	50 m backstroke
Silver medal – second place	2012 Debrecen	100 m backstroke
Silver medal – second place	2012 Debrecen	4 x 100 m medley
Mediterranean Games
Bronze medal – third place	2013 Mersin	50 m backstroke

Arianna Barbieri (born 23 February 1989) is an Italian swimmer.

== Biography ==
In 2012 Arianna Barbieri qualified for her first Olympic appearance in London 2012, she competed in the 100 m backstroke and the Italian 4 x 100 m medley relay team.

== See also ==
- Italy at the 2012 Summer Olympics - Swimming
