= Jenny Mensing =

German swimmer

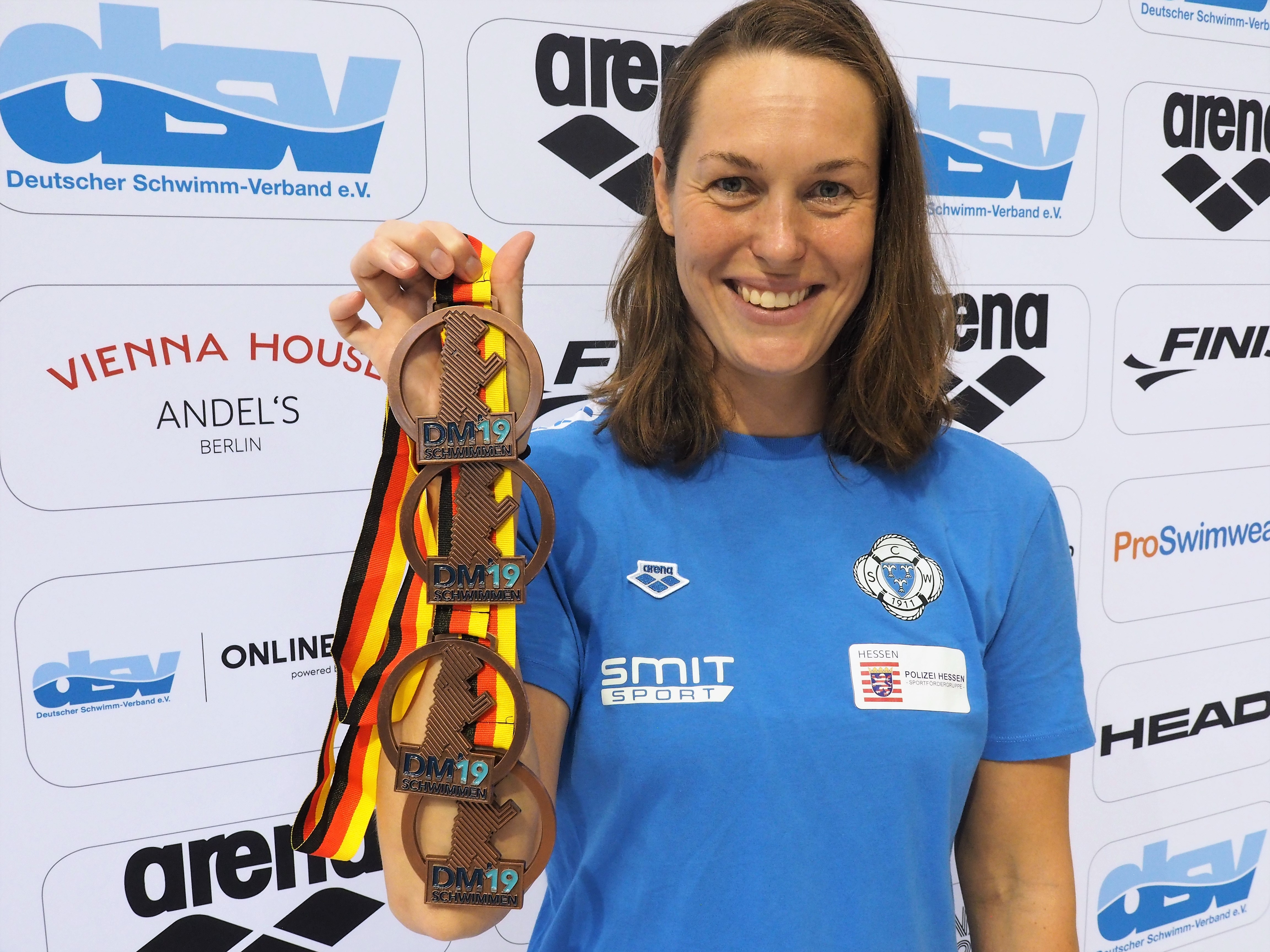
- Mensing in 2019

Personal information
- Nationality: German
- Born: February 26, 1986 (age 40) Berlin, Germany
- Height: 183 cm (6 ft 0 in)
- Weight: 70 kg (154 lb)

Sport
- Sport: Swimming
Medal record
European Championships (LC)
Gold medal – first place	2012 Debrecen	100 m backstroke
Gold medal – first place	2012 Debrecen	4 x 100 m medley
Silver medal – second place	2012 Debrecen	200 m backstroke
Bronze medal – third place	2010 Budapest	100 m backstroke
European Championships (SC)
Silver medal – second place	2009 Istanbul	200 m backstroke
Silver medal – second place	2010 Eindhoven	4×50 m medley

Jenny Mensing (born 26 February 1986) is a German swimmer from Berlin. She has received several medals at European Championships. At the 2016 Summer Olympics in Rio de Janeiro, she competed in the women's 200 metre backstroke. She finished in 16th place in the semifinals and did not qualify for the final. She was a member of the 4 x 100 metre medley relay team which finished 12th in the heats and did not qualify for the final.

Outside her sports career, Mensing works as a police officer, currently holding the rank of Polizeikommissar (police inspector).
