= Gizem Çam =

Turkish swimmer (born 1991)

Personal information
- Nationality: TUR
- Born: April 4, 1991 (age 35)

Sport
- Sport: Swimming
- Strokes: Butterfly, backstroke
- Club: Fenerbahçe Swimming

Gizem Çam (born 4 April 1991) is a Turkish female swimmer competing in butterfly and backstroke events.

A member of Fenerbahçe Swimming in Istanbul, she is holder of many national records in different age categories. She set a national record in the 50m backstroke event with 27.82 at the FINA World Short Course Swimming Championships held in Istanbul, Turkey.

== Achievements ==
Year	Competition	Venue	Position	Event	Notes
2012	FINA World Swimming Championships (25 m)	Istanbul, Turkey	19th	50m backstroke	27.82 NR

== See also ==
- Turkish women in sports
