= Hazal Sarıkaya =

Turkish swimmer (born 1996)

Personal information
- Nationality: TUR
- Born: 4 September 1996 (age 29) Istanbul, Turkey
- Height: 1.68 m (5 ft 6 in) (2012)
- Weight: 63 kg (139 lb) (2012)

Sport
- Sport: Swimming
- Strokes: Backstroke
- Club: FMV Işık Sport Club, Istanbul
- Coach: Ali Can

Hazal Sarıkaya (pronounced [ˈhazaɫ ˌsaɾɯˈkaja]; born on 4 September 1996 in Istanbul, Turkey) is a Turkish swimmer competing in backstroke events. She is a member of FMV Işık Sport Club in Istanbul.

Sarıkaya won the silver medal at the Swim Cup held in Amsterdam, Netherlands with a score of 29.68.

She is the holder of several national records in backstroke.

She was invited to participate in the 100 m backstroke event at the 2012 Summer Olympics.

== Personal bests ==
- 50 m backstroke: 29.10 NR - 30 April 2011 Balkan Junior Championships, Banja Luka, Bosnia and Herzegovina
- 100 m backstroke: 1:02.58 NR - 25 March 2011 French Championships, Strasbourg, France
- 2:15.40 200 m backstroke: 2:15.40 NR - 6 July 2011 European Junior Championships, Belgrade, Serbia
- 4 × 100 m medley relay: 4:07.56 NR - 27 May 2012 European Aquatics Championships, Debrecen, Hungary

== Achievements ==
Year	Competition	Venue	Position	Event	Notes
2011	French Championships	Strasbourg, France	3rd	100 m backstroke	1:02.58 NR
2012	Amsterdam Swim Cup	Amsterdam, Netherlands	2nd	50 m backstroke	29.68

== See also ==
- Turkish women in sports
