= Mie Nielsen =

Danish swimmer (born 1996)

Mie Ø. Nielsen
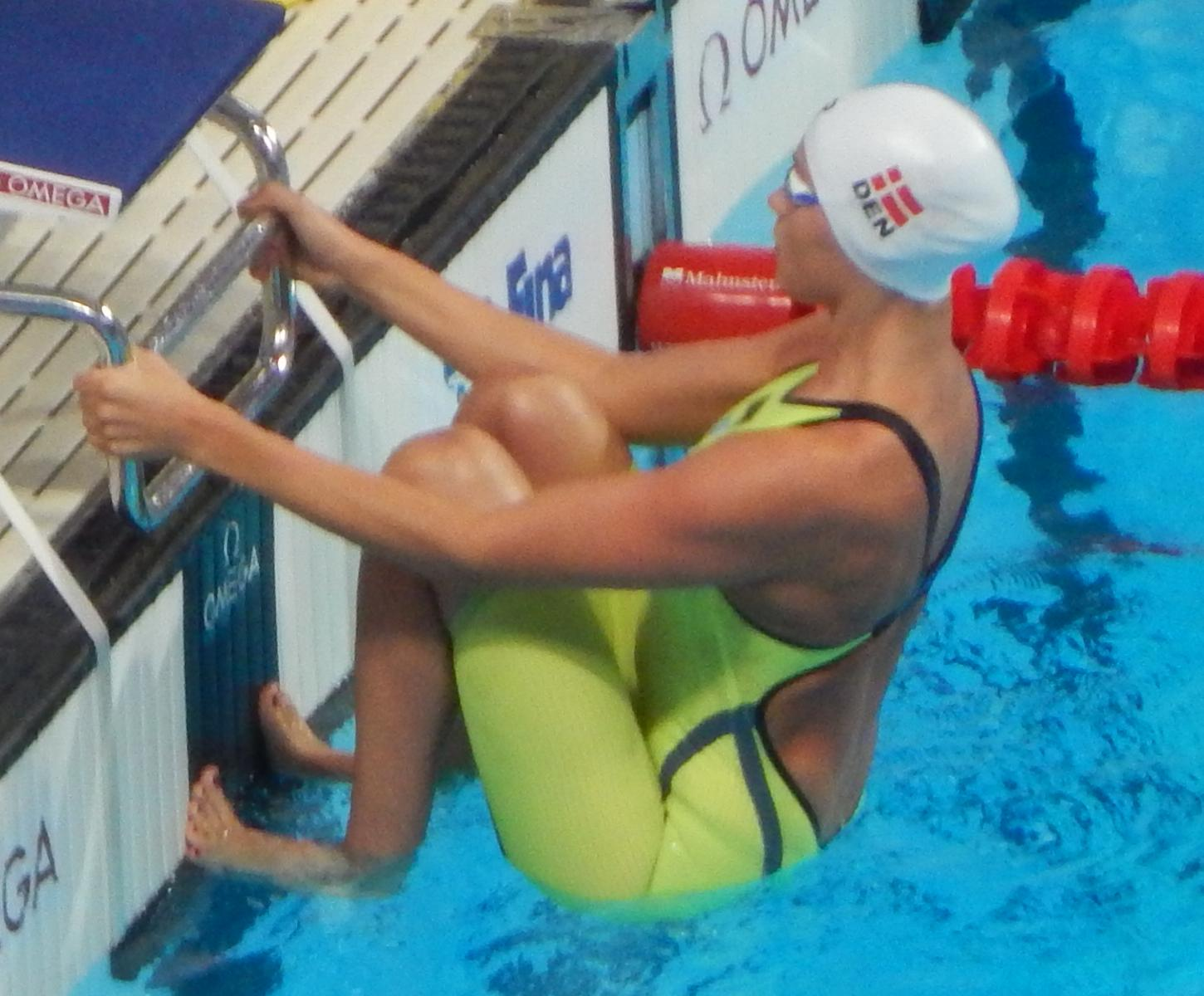

Personal information
- Full name: Mie Østergaard Nielsen
- National team: Denmark
- Born: 25 September 1996 (age 29) Aalborg, Denmark
- Height: 1.84 m (6 ft 0 in)
- Weight: 67 kg (148 lb)

Sport
- Sport: Swimming
- Strokes: Backstroke, Freestyle
- Club: Aalborg Swimming Club
- Coach: Eyleifur Jóhannesson
Medal record
Olympic Games
| Bronze medal – third place | 2016 Rio de Janeiro | 4×100 m medley |
World Championships (LC)
| Bronze medal – third place | 2015 Kazan | 100 m backstroke |
World Championships (SC)
| Gold medal – first place | 2012 Istanbul | 4×100 m medley |
| Gold medal – first place | 2014 Doha | 4×50 m medley |
| Gold medal – first place | 2014 Doha | 4×100 m medley |
| Silver medal – second place | 2012 Istanbul | 100 m backstroke |
| Bronze medal – third place | 2012 Istanbul | 4×100 m freestyle |
| Bronze medal – third place | 2014 Doha | 4×50 m freestyle |
| Bronze medal – third place | 2016 Windsor | 4x50 m medley |
European Championships (LC)
| Gold medal – first place | 2014 Berlin | 100 m backstroke |
| Gold medal – first place | 2014 Berlin | 4×100 m medley |
| Gold medal – first place | 2016 London | 100 m backstroke |
| Silver medal – second place | 2016 London | 50 m backstroke |
| Silver medal – second place | 2018 Glasgow | 4×100 m medley |
| Bronze medal – third place | 2014 Berlin | 50 m backstroke |
| Bronze medal – third place | 2018 Glasgow | 4×100 m freestyle |
European Championships (SC)
| Gold medal – first place | 2011 Szczecin | 4×50 m medley |
| Gold medal – first place | 2013 Herning | 100 m backstroke |
| Gold medal – first place | 2013 Herning | 4×50 m freestyle |
| Silver medal – second place | 2011 Szczecin | 4×50 m freestyle |
| Silver medal – second place | 2013 Herning | 4×50 m medley |
| Bronze medal – third place | 2011 Szczecin | 100 m backstroke |
| Bronze medal – third place | 2011 Szczecin | 100 m medley |
| Bronze medal – third place | 2017 Copenhagen | 4×50 m freestyle |
European Junior Championships
| Gold medal – first place | 2011 Belgrade | 50 m backstroke |
| Gold medal – first place | 2011 Belgrade | 100 m backstroke |
| Silver medal – second place | 2011 Belgrade | 100 m freestyle |
| Bronze medal – third place | 2011 Belgrade | 4×100 m medley |

Mie Østergaard Nielsen (born 25 September 1996) is a Danish former competitive swimmer who holds the Danish record in several backstroke events.

== Career ==
Nielsen won her first international senior medals at the 2011 European Short Course Swimming Championships, where she won four medals and was named newcomer of the championship.

She made her Olympics debut at the 2012 games where she was taking part in the 100 and 200 m backstroke and the 4×100 m relays in freestyle and medley.

Nielsen missed the 2013 World Aquatics Championships with a knee injury, but won the bronze medal in the 100 m backstroke at the 2015 World Aquatics Championships in Kazan, Russia.

At the 2016 European Aquatics Championships in London, she successfully defended her title in the 100 m backstroke, breaking the Championships record and national record with a time of 58.73.

At the 2016 Summer Olympics in Rio de Janeiro, she won a bronze medal as a part of the 4 × 100 m medley relay alongside Rikke Møller Pedersen, Jeanette Ottesen and Pernille Blume. Here they also broke the European record with a time of 3:55.01.

In October 2020 Nielsen announced her retirement from competitive swimming, citing continued shoulder problems and the uncertainty regarding the postponed 2020 Summer Olympics.

== Personal life ==
She is the daughter of Benny Nielsen, who won silver in the 200 m butterfly at the 1988 Summer Olympics and Lone Jensen, who participated in the 1978 World Aquatics Championships.
