= Mercedes Peris =

Spanish swimmer

Personal information
- Full name: María Mercedes Peris Minguet
- Nickname: Merche
- Nationality: Spain
- Born: 5 January 1985 (age 41) Paiporta, Valencia, Spain
- Height: 1.75 m (5 ft 9 in)
- Weight: 59 kg (130 lb)

Sport
- Sport: Swimming
- Strokes: Backstroke
Medal record
World Championships (SC)
Bronze medal – third place	2010 Dubai	50 m backstroke
European Championships (LC)
Gold medal – first place	2012 Debrecen	50 m backstroke
Bronze medal – third place	2010 Budapest	50 m backstroke
Mediterranean Games
Silver medal – second place	2005 Almería	100 m backstroke
Silver medal – second place	2005 Almería	4x100 m medley
Bronze medal – third place	2005 Almería	50 m backstroke

María Mercedes "Merche" Peris Minguet (Note: In this Spanish name, the first or paternal surname is Peris and the second or maternal family name is Minguet.) (born 5 January 1985 in Paiporta, Valencia, Spain) is an Olympic and national record holding backstroke swimmer from Spain. She competed for Spain at the 2008 Olympics.
