= Klaudia Naziębło =

Polish swimmer (born 1993)

Personal information
- Born: 3 December 1993 (age 32)

Sport
- Sport: Swimming
Medal record
Representing Poland
Women's lifesaving
World Games
Gold medal – first place	2022 Birmingham	4x50 m obstacle

Klaudia Naziębło (born 3 December 1993) is a Polish swimmer. She competed in the women's 200 metre butterfly event at the 2017 World Aquatics Championships.
