= Elena Gemo =

Italian swimmer (born 1987)

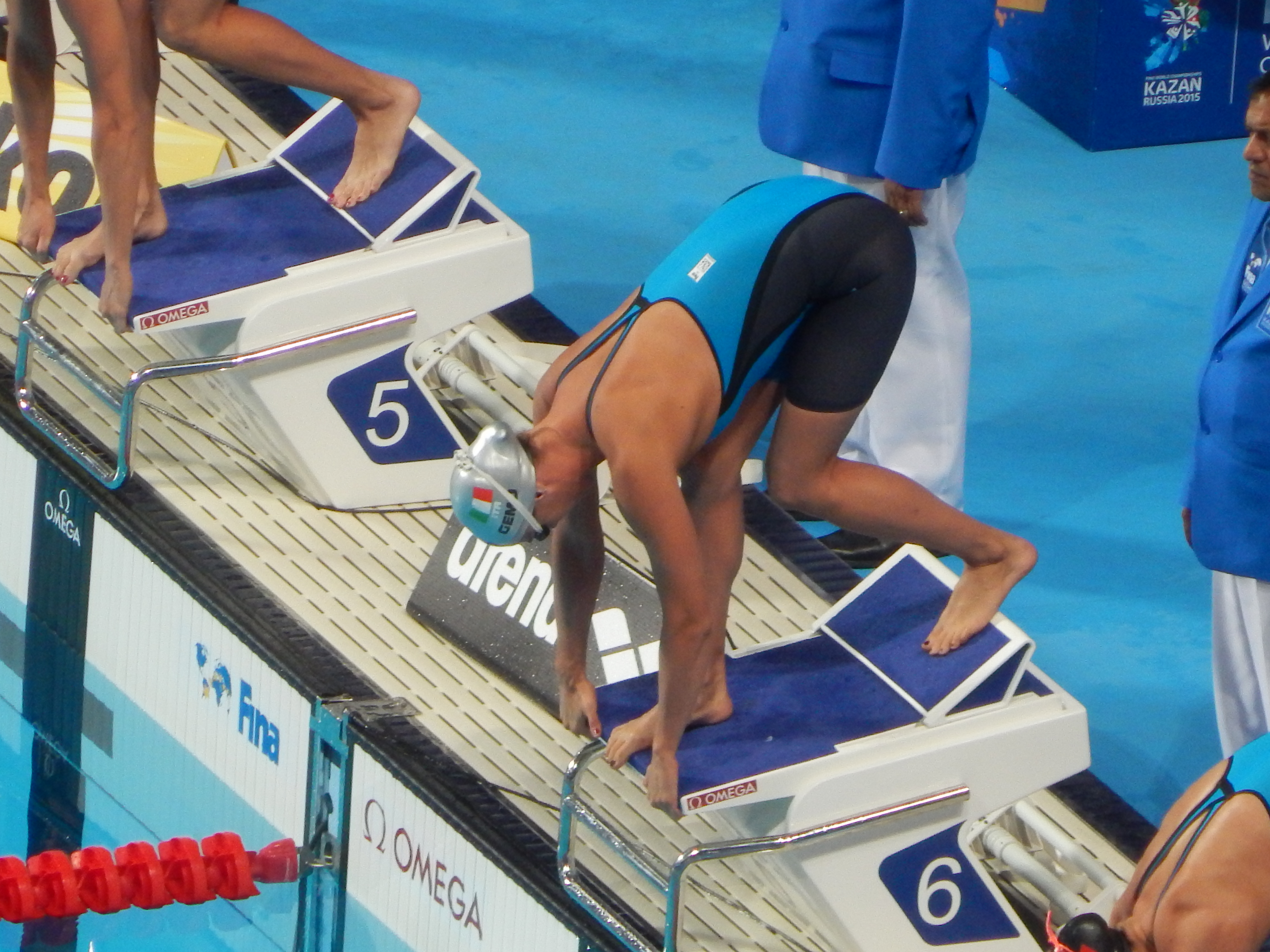
- Kazan 2015

Personal information
- Nationality: Italy
- Born: 17 March 1987 (age 39) Galzignano Terme, Italy
- Height: 180 cm (5 ft 11 in)
- Weight: 65 kg (143 lb)

Sport
- Sport: Swimming
- Strokes: Backstroke
- Club: Circolo Canottieri Aniene
- Coach: Andrea Palloni
Medal record
European Championships (SC)
Silver medal – second place	2010 Eindhoven	50 m backstroke
Bronze medal – third place	2008 Rijeka	50 m backstroke
Bronze medal – third place	2008 Rijeka	4×50 m medley
Bronze medal – third place	2010 Eindhoven	4×50 m medley
Bronze medal – third place	2015 Netanya	4×50 m medley
Universiade
Silver medal – second place	2009 Belgrade	4×100 m medley relay
Silver medal – second place	2013 Kazan	4×100 m medley relay
Mediterranean Games
Gold medal – first place	2005 Almeria	50 m butterfly
Gold medal – first place	2009 Pescara	50 m backstroke
Gold medal – first place	2013 Mersin	100 m backstroke
Gold medal – first place	2013 Mersin	4×100 m medley
Silver medal – second place	2005 Almeria	50 m backstroke
European Junior Championships
Bronze medal – third place	2002 Linz	100 m butterfly

Elena Gemo (born 17 March 1987, in Galzignano Terme) is an Italian swimmer. She is 180 cm tall and weighs 69 kg.

== Biography ==
Gemo qualified for her first Olympic appearance in London 2012. At the 2012 European Aquatics Championships, despite having swum the 7th time in the heat, was not admitted to the semifinals, because each nation could only have a maximum of two athletes in the semifinals and three Italian athletes had qualified.

She is the Italian record holder in the 50-metre-long course and 50 and 100 meter short course backstroke.

== Achievements ==
Year	Competition	Venue	Position	Event	Performance	Notes
2012	European Championships (LC)	(Hungary) Debrecen	4th	100 m Backstroke	55"07	
2012	European Championships (LC)	(Hungary) Debrecen	1st	4 × 200 m Backstroke	7'52"90	
2012	European Championships (LC)	(Hungary) Debrecen	3rd	4 × 100 m Backstroke	3'39"84	

== See also ==
- Italy at the 2012 Summer Olympics - Swimming
- List of Mediterranean Games records in swimming
