= Anastasia Fesikova =

Russian swimmer

Anastasia Zueva
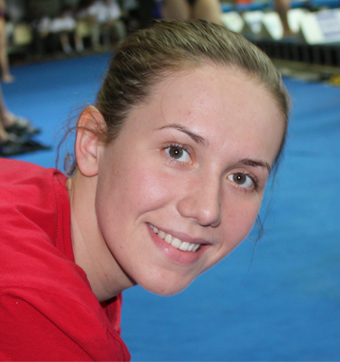

Personal information
- Full name: Anastasia Valeryevna Fesikova
- Nickname: "Nastya"
- National team: Russia
- Born: 8 May 1990 (age 36) Voskresensk, Russian SFSR, Soviet Union (now Russia)
- Height: 1.83 m (6 ft 0 in)
- Weight: 70 kg (154 lb)

Sport
- Sport: Swimming
- Strokes: Backstroke
- Club: Penza school of Olympic reserve
- Coach: Natalia Kozlova
Medal record
Women's swimming
Representing Russia
Olympic Games
Silver medal – second place	2012 London	200 m backstroke
World Championships (LC)
Gold medal – first place	2011 Shanghai	50 m backstroke
Silver medal – second place	2009 Rome	100 m backstroke
Silver medal – second place	2009 Rome	200 m backstroke
Silver medal – second place	2011 Shanghai	100 m backstroke
Silver medal – second place	2017 Budapest	4×100 m medley
European Championships (LC)
Gold medal – first place	2008 Eindhoven	50 m backstroke
Gold medal – first place	2008 Eindhoven	100 m backstroke
Gold medal – first place	2018 Glasgow	100 m backstroke
Gold medal – first place	2018 Glasgow	4×100 m medley
Silver medal – second place	2008 Eindhoven	200 m backstroke
Silver medal – second place	2008 Eindhoven	4×100 m medley
Silver medal – second place	2018 Glasgow	50 m backstroke
Silver medal – second place	2020 Budapest	4×100 m medley
European Championships (SC)
Gold medal – first place	2011 Szczecin	50 m backstroke
Silver medal – second place	2011 Szczecin	100 m backstroke
Silver medal – second place	2011 Szczecin	4×50 m medley
Summer Universiade
Gold medal – first place	2013 Kazan	50 m backstroke
Gold medal – first place	2013 Kazan	100 m backstroke
Gold medal – first place	2013 Kazan	4×100 m medley

Anastasia Valeryevna Fesikova (Russian: Анастасия Валерьевна Фесикова; born 8 May 1990), née Anastasia Zuyeva, is a Russian swimmer who holds the Russian national records for the 50, 100 and 200 metres backstroke events. She swam for Russia at the 2008 Olympics, the 2012 Olympics and the 2016 Olympics. At the 2012 Olympic Games, she won a silver medal in the 200 m backstroke.

== Career ==
=== International Swimming League ===
In spring 2020, Fesikova signed to the Toronto Titans, the first Canadian based professional swim team, in their inaugural season.

=== World Championships ===
At the 2012 London Olympics, Zueva won a silver medal in 200 m backstroke behind American Missy Franklin. Zueva competed at the 2007 World Championships taking 7th place in 100 m backstroke, 5th place 4×100 meters medley relay.

=== European Championships ===
Zueva made her debut in the national team of Russia at the 2006 European Championships in Mallorca, Spain. At the 2008 European Championships in Eindhoven, she won gold in 50 m and 100 m backstroke, silver in the 200m backstroke, and silver in the 4 x 100 meters medley relay. Zueva aggravated an old back injury and she was forced to miss the beginning of the 2009 season.

=== Other ===
On 28 April 2009 at the 2009 Russian Championships, Zueva twice swam under the existing world record in the women's long-course 50 m backstroke of 27.67 (held by Australia's Sophie Edington). In prelims of the meet, Zueva clocked a 27.48 to lead qualifying for the final, where she won the event in 27.47. However, on 29 June 2009, FINA announced they were not recognizing either of these two swims by Zueva as the world record. This subsequently became problematic, as Zueva swam a 27.56 at the Monte Carlo meet of the 2009 Mare Nostrum series on 14 June 2009. This time by Zueva was not viewed as a world record at the time of the meet, as it is slower than either time she swam in April at the Russian Championships. However, the time is still faster than Edington's world record time. She swam under the existing world record in 2009 in the women's long-course 50 m backstroke 3 times. However, two of these 3 times have not been approved as the world record, and the third, as of July 2009, is a likely candidate to not be approved as well.

Zueva's time from Monaco now becomes the next candidate for the world record, but reports indicate that this time will also not be approved as the world record as Zueva was not drug tested at the time of the swim because she did not break what was thought to be the world record (and all world record applications must have a cleared drug-test for approval). Zueva also lost-out on a world record prize money bonus from the meet organizers.

== Achievements ==
In March 2008, she set the European records in winning the 50 m and 100 m backstrokes (28.05 and 59.41) at the 2008 European Championships.

At the 2008 Olympics, she set and held the Olympic record in the women's 100 m backstroke (59.61) for a heat during the preliminary rounds of the event. At the 2012 Olympics, she won her first medal, a silver in the 200 m backstroke.

== Personal life ==
At age 5, Zueva was brought by her mother, Valentina Ivanovna, to the pool. She and her family later moved from Moscow to Penza. She trained in Penza school of Olympic reserve. Her hobbies include hiking and sailing. In August 2013, Zueva married fellow Russian swimmer Sergey Fesikov and gave birth to her first child in 2014. Zueva (now Fesikova) returned to international competition in 2015 for the 2015 World Championships in Kazan, Russia.

=== Olympic results ===
- Beijing 2008:
  - Women's 100 Metres Backstroke Final, 5th
  - Women's 200 Metres Backstroke Final, 4th
  - Women's 4 x 100 Metres Medley Relay Final, 5th
- London 2012:
  - Women's 100 Metres Backstroke Final, 4th
  - Women's 200 Metres Backstroke Final, 2nd
  - Women's 4 x 100 Metres Medley Relay Final, 4th

== See also ==
- World record progression 50 metres backstroke
- World record progression 100 metres backstroke

Records
Preceded by Kirsty Coventry	Women's 100 metre backstroke world record holder (long course); 27 July 2009 – 28 July 2009	Succeeded by Gemma Spofforth
Sporting positions
Preceded by Sophie Edington	Mare Nostrum Tour Overall Winner; 2009	Succeeded by Rebecca Soni
