= Daria Ustinova =

Russian swimmer

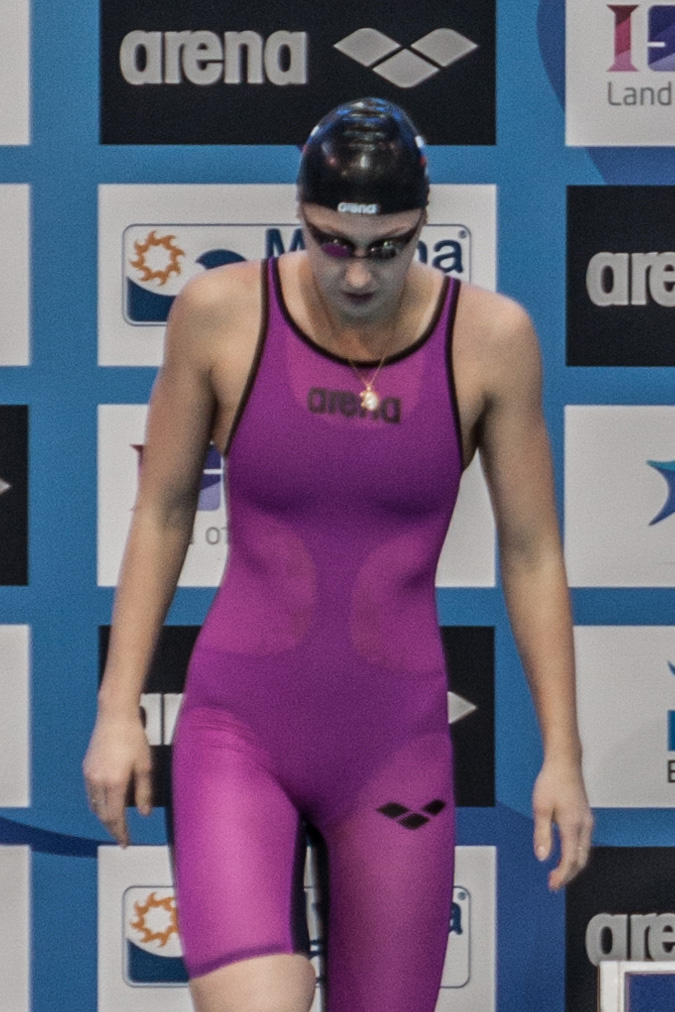
- Ustinova in 2015

Personal information
- Full name: Daria Konstantinovna Ustinova
- National team: Russia
- Born: 29 August 1998 (age 27) Kamensk-Uralsky, Sverdlovsk Oblast, Russia
- Height: 183 cm (6 ft 0 in)
- Weight: 70 kg (154 lb)

Sport
- Sport: Swimming
- Strokes: Backstroke, freestyle
- Coach: Dmitry Shalagin, Svetlana Shalagina
Medal record
Women's swimming
Representing Russia
World Championships (LC)
Bronze medal – third place	2013 Barcelona	4×100 m medley
World Championships (SC)
Bronze medal – third place	2016 Windsor	4x200 m freestyle
European Championships (LC)
Gold medal – first place	2018 Glasgow	4×100 m medley
Silver medal – second place	2018 Glasgow	200 m backstroke
Bronze medal – third place	2014 Berlin	200 m backstroke
European Championships (SC)
Silver medal – second place	2015 Netanya	200 m backstroke
Military World Games
Silver medal – second place	2019 Wuhan	200 m backstroke
Silver medal – second place	2019 Wuhan	4×100 m freestyle
Silver medal – second place	2019 Wuhan	4×100 m medley
Silver medal – second place	2019 Wuhan	4×100 m mixed freestyle

Daria Konstantinovna Ustinova (Russian: Дарья Константиновна Устинова; born 29 August 1998) is a Russian backstroke swimmer. She is a former Junior World record holder in women's 200 m backstroke.

== Career ==
At the 2013 European Junior Championships Ustinova won 5 golds (100 m backstroke, 4 × 100 m mixed medley, 4 × 100 m medley, 50 m backstroke and 4 × 100 m freestyle). At the 2013 World Junior Championships she won gold in 4 × 100 m medley, 100 m backstroke, 4x100 mixed medley, silver in 50 m backstroke and bronze in 200 m backstroke.

Ustinova (together with Svetlana Chimrova, Rozaliya Nasretdinova and Yuliya Yefimova) won gold in 4x50 m medley at the 2013 European Short Course Championships but was later disqualified due to Yefimova's positive test for DHEA, a prescription steroid banned in professional sports. Ustinova herself was the subject of a reprimand from Russian authorities after abnormalities occurred in a doping test when she was 14 years old. In light of her youth, no further sanction was made at the time.

In 2014, Ustinova won 6 golds at the 2014 European Junior Championships. She won a bronze medal in the individual 200 m at the 2014 European Aquatics Championships and a bronze in the medley relay at the 2013 World Aquatics Championships. She competed at the 2014 FINA World Swimming Championships (25 m) in Doha, Qatar.

In 2–9 August, Ustinova competed at the 2015 World Championships in Kazan. She reached the semifinals in women's 50 m backstroke and qualified for the finals in women's 200 m backstroke; Ustinova finished in 4th place behind Katinka Hosszú and set a new Junior World record in a time of 2:07.64. Ustinova then competed in the FINA Swimming World Cup series in Moscow, taking the gold medal in 200 m and bronze in 50 m backstroke. At the FINA World Cup in Chartres, Ustinova won the gold medal in women's 200 m backstroke. Ustinova finished 4th in 100 m backstroke behind American Missy Franklin and 7th in 50 m backstroke.

On 25 July 2016, Ustinova was named by FINA as an athlete who had been identified by WADA as one that had benefited from the "disappearing positive methodology", and as such FINA declared her ineligible for the 2016 Summer Olympics in accordance with the requirements issued by the International Olympic Committee the previous day. No further information was released as to possible further punishments for this second doping offence. However, Ustinova appealed to the Court of Arbitration for Sport, which on 6 August allowed her to take part in the Olympics.
