= Ida Lindborg =

Swedish swimmer

Personal information
- Nationality: Swedish
- Born: 13 June 1994 (age 32)

Sport
- Sport: Swimming

Ida Lindborg (born 13 June 1994) is a Swedish backstroke, butterfly and freestyle swimmer.

She competed at the 2016 Summer Olympics in Rio de Janeiro.
