= Mathilde Cini =

French swimmer (born 1994)

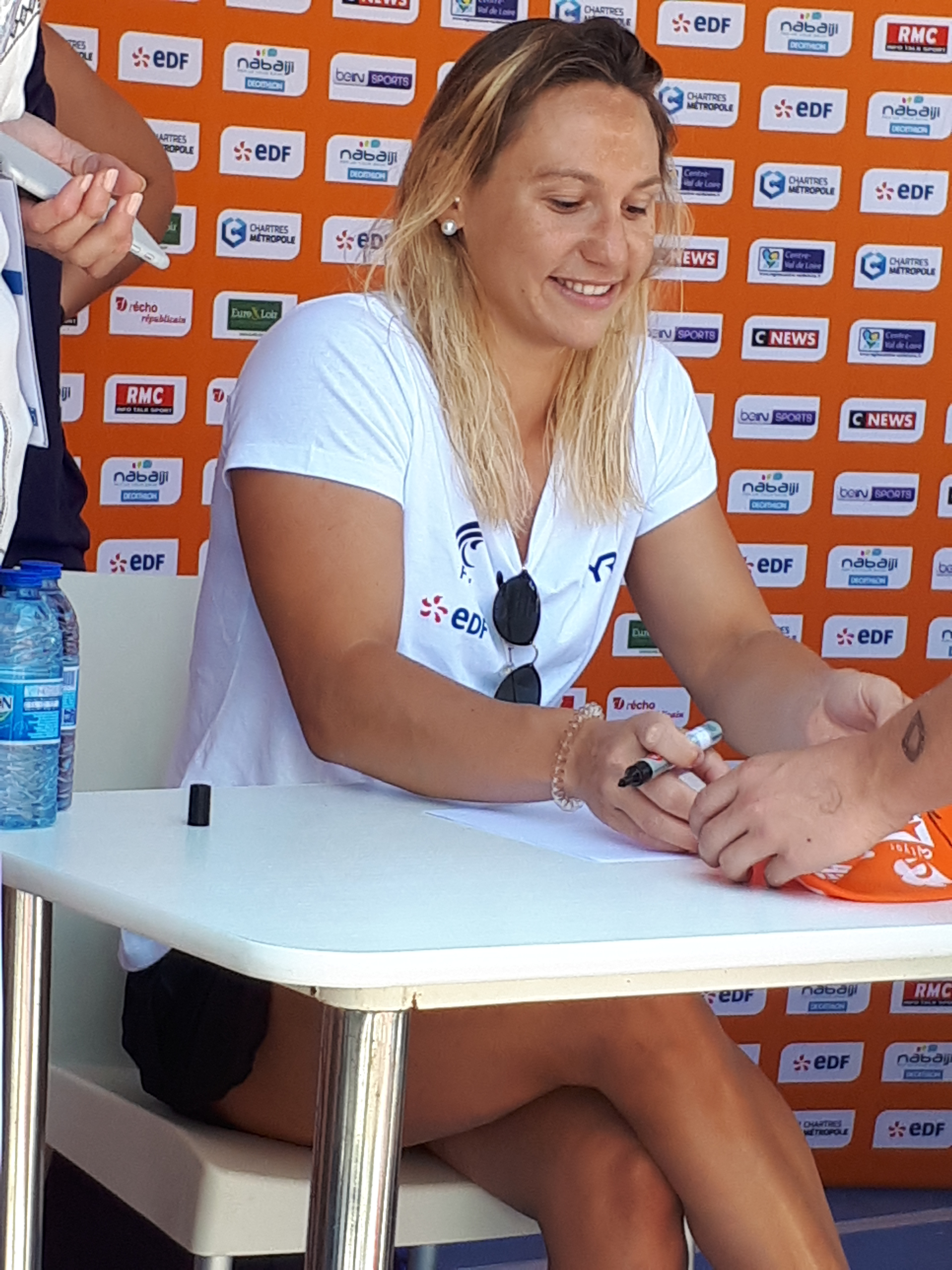
- Cini in 2018

Personal information
- Nationality: French
- Born: 18 November 1994 (age 31) Briançon, France
- Height: 1.66 m (5 ft 5 in)
- Weight: 62 kg (137 lb)

Sport
- Sport: Swimming
- Club: Valence Triathlon
Medal record
European Championships (SC)
Bronze medal – third place	2017 Copenhagen	4×50 m medley

Mathilde Cini (born 18 November 1994) is a French swimmer.

She competed at the 2015 World Aquatics Championships and at the 2016 Summer Olympics in Rio de Janeiro.

== Biography ==
Born in Briançon, Mathilde Cini moved with her family during childhood to Montmeyran in the Drôme. She began her sporting career with triathlon at the age of seven, before devoting herself exclusively to swimming, the triathlon discipline in which she is most at ease in competition.

In 2010, she took part in the Youth Olympic Games, winning gold in the 50-meter backstroke. At the age of eighteen, Mathilde Cini heads for Paris and the INSEP, where a 50-meter pool is at her disposal, unlike in Valence.

After winning all three backstroke titles (50, 100 and 200 meters) at the 2014 French Short Course Championships, at the World Short Course Championships in Doha, she and her teammates won the bronze medal in the 4 x 50 m medley relay, during which she beat the French 50 m backstroke record held by Laure Manaudou in 26 s 61.
