= Sanja Jovanović =

Croatian swimmer (born 1986)

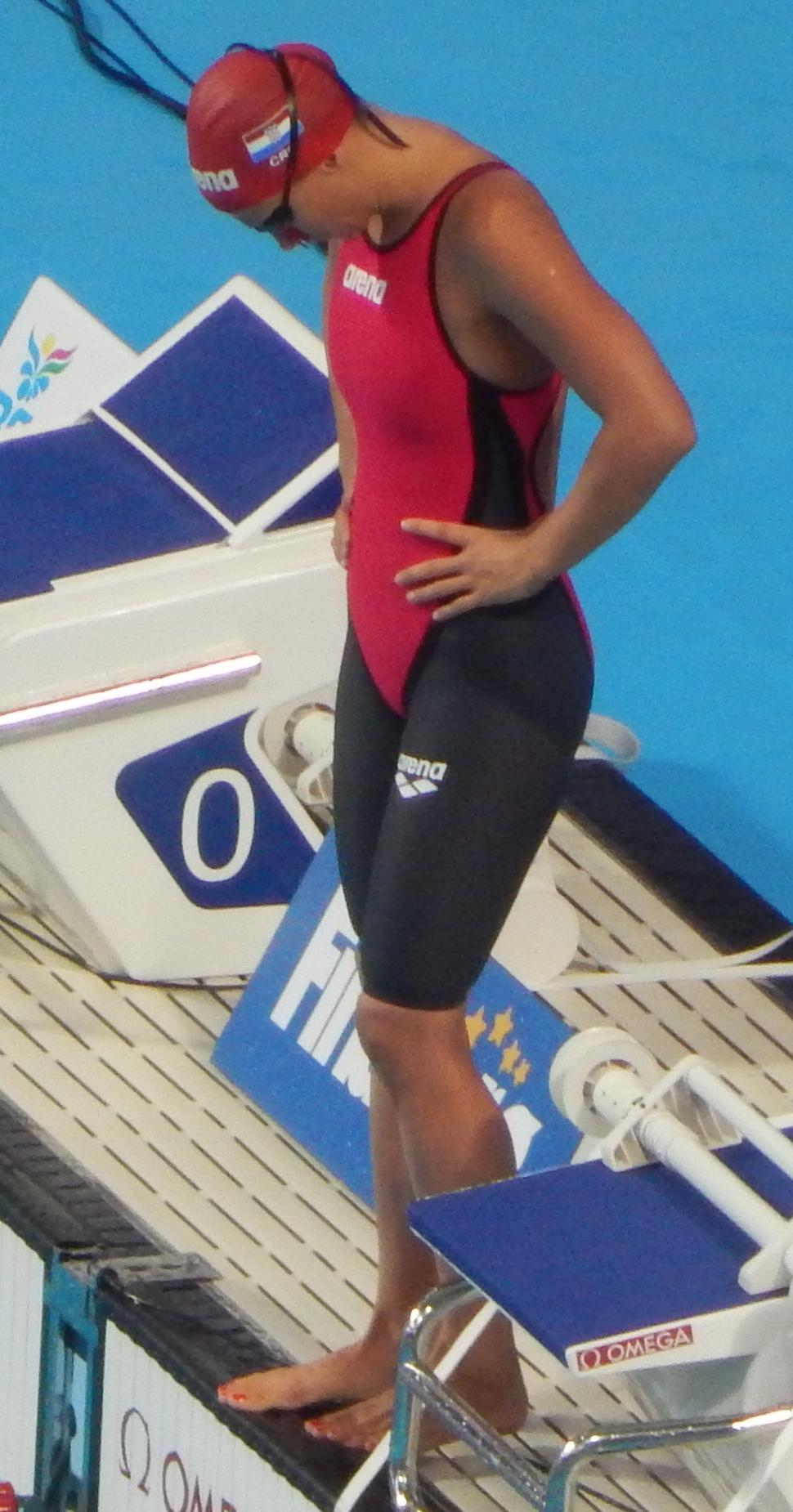
- Kazan in 2015

Personal information
- Nationality: Croatia
- Born: 15 September 1986 (age 39) Dubrovnik, Croatia, Yugoslavia
- Height: 1.73 m (5 ft 8 in)

Sport
- Sport: Swimming
- Strokes: Backstroke
- Club: PK Jug Dubrovnik
Medal record
World SC Championships
Gold medal – first place	2008 Manchester	50 m backstroke
Bronze medal – third place	2008 Manchester	100 m backstroke
European Championships (LC)
Silver medal – second place	2012 Debrecen	50 m backstroke
Bronze medal – third place	2004 Madrid	200 m backstroke
Bronze medal – third place	2008 Eindhoven	50 m backstroke
European Championships (SC)
Gold medal – first place	2007 Debrecen	50 m backstroke
Gold medal – first place	2008 Rijeka	50 m backstroke
Gold medal – first place	2008 Rijeka	100 m backstroke
Gold medal – first place	2009 Istanbul	50 m backstroke
Gold medal – first place	2010 Eindhoven	50 m backstroke
Silver medal – second place	2007 Debrecen	100 m backstroke
Silver medal – second place	2009 Istanbul	100 m backstroke
Silver medal – second place	2012 Chartres	50 m backstroke
Bronze medal – third place	2015 Netanya	50 m backstroke
Mediterranean Games
Gold medal – first place	Mersin 2013	50 m backstroke
Silver medal – second place	Tunis 2001	100 m backstroke
Silver medal – second place	Almeria 2005	50 m butterfly
Bronze medal – third place	Tunis 2001	100 m freestyle
Bronze medal – third place	Almeria 2005	100 m backstroke
Bronze medal – third place	Pescara 2009	50 m backstroke

Sanja Jovanović (born 15 September 1986 in Dubrovnik) is a female backstroke swimmer from Croatia, who made her Olympic debut for her native country at the 2004 Summer Olympics in Athens, Greece. There she competed in the 100 m and 200 m backstroke, where she finished in 17th and 13th position. On 13 April 2008 she broke the world record in 50 meters backstroke on European Short Course Swimming Championships, improving her record set on 15 December 2007. She has a twin sister and two other sisters, and lives in suburb of Dubrovnik called Mokošica.

== Olympic results ==
Olympic results
Event	2004	2008	2012
100 m backstroke	17th 1:02.47	22nd 1:01.30	36th 1:03.38
200 m backstroke	13th 2:13.76	31st 2:15.57	—N/a

At the 2013 Mediterranean Games held in Mersin, Turkey she won the gold medal in 50 meters backstroke (28:48)

== World records ==
Discipline			Time	Date and place
backstroke	50m	SC	26.50	2007-12-15, Debrecen
backstroke	50m	SC	26.37	2008-04-13, Manchester
backstroke	50m	SC	26.23	2008-12-13, Rijeka
backstroke	50m	SC	25.70	2009-12-12, Istanbul

== See also ==
- World record progression 50 metres backstroke

Records
Preceded by Li Hui; Zhao Jing	Women's 50 metres backstroke world record holder (short course); 15 December 2007 – 6 November 2009; 12 December 2009 – 7 December 2014	Succeeded by Marieke Guehrer; Etiene Medeiros
