= Carlotta Zofkova =

Italian swimmer (born 1993)

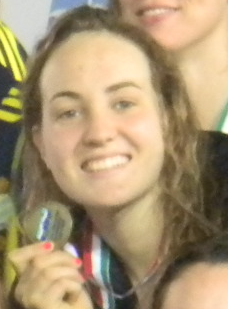
- Zofkova in 2015

Personal information
- Nationality: Italian
- Born: 22 February 1993 (age 33)
- Height: 1.83 m (6 ft 0 in)
- Weight: 74 kg (163 lb)

Sport
- Sport: Swimming
- Strokes: Backstroke
Medal record
Women's swimming
Representing Italy
European Championships (LC)
Bronze medal – third place	2018 Glasgow	100 m backstroke
Mediterranean Games
Gold medal – first place	2022 Oran	4×100 m medley
Silver medal – second place	2022 Oran	100 m backstroke

Carlotta Zofkova Costa de Saint-Genix de Beauregard (born 22 February 1993) is an Italian backstroke swimmer. She represented her country at the 2016 Summer Olympics.
