= Simona Kubová =

Czech swimmer (born 1991)

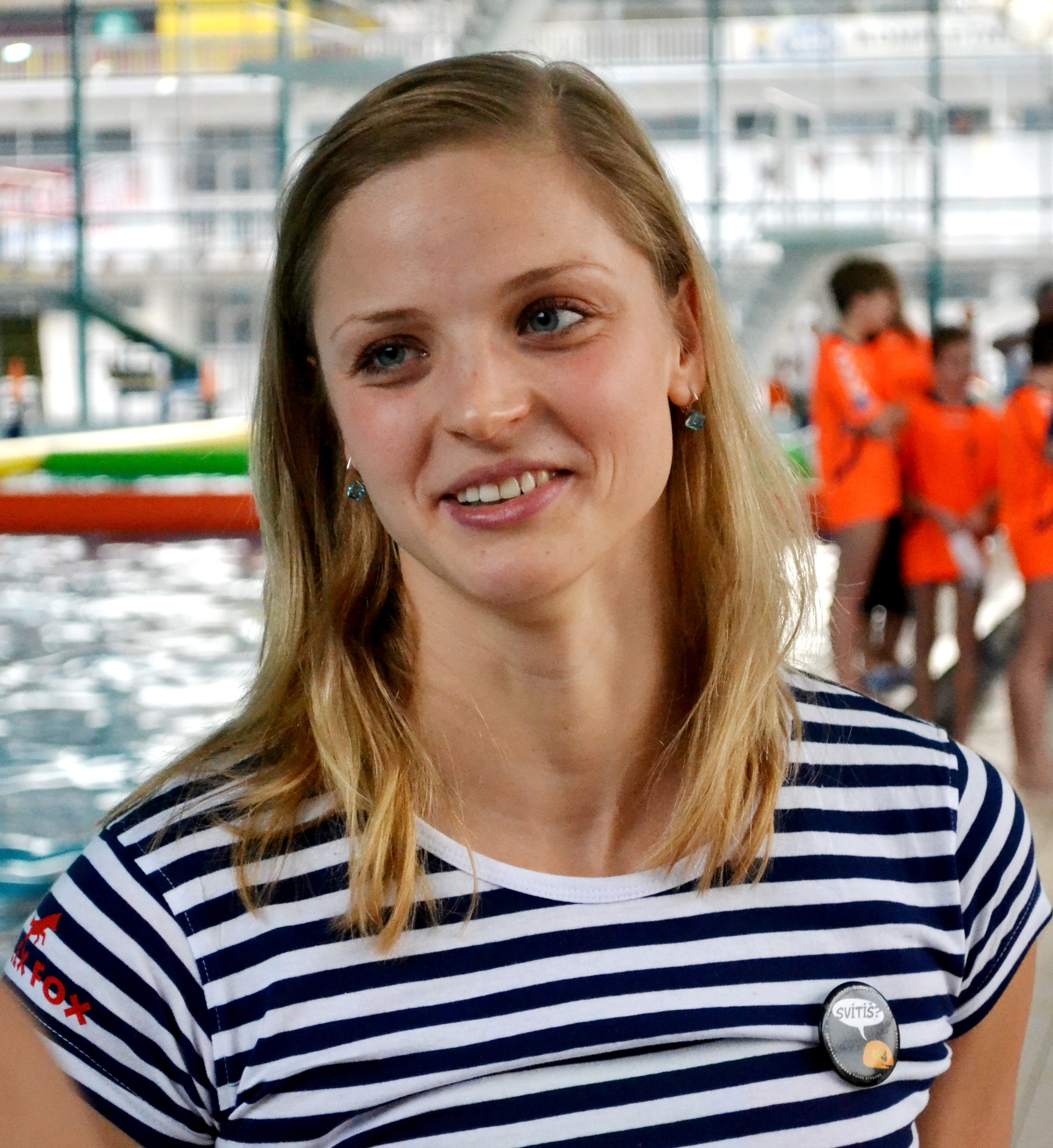
- Baumrtová in 2015

Personal information
- Nationality: Czech
- Born: 24 August 1991 (age 34) Chomutov, Czechoslovakia
- Height: 1.76 m (5 ft 9 in)
- Weight: 68 kg (150 lb)

Sport
- Sport: Swimming
- Strokes: Backstroke
- Club: TJ Slavia Chomutov
Medal record
World Championships (SC)
Bronze medal – third place	2012 Istanbul	100 m backstroke
European Championships (LC)
Bronze medal – third place	2012 Debrecen	100 m backstroke
European Championships (SC)
Gold medal – first place	2013 Herning	50 m backstroke
Silver medal – second place	2012 Chartres	4×50 m medley
Silver medal – second place	2013 Herning	100 m backstroke
Silver medal – second place	2013 Herning	200 m backstroke
Bronze medal – third place	2010 Eindhoven	50 m backstroke
Bronze medal – third place	2011 Szczecin	50 m backstroke
Bronze medal – third place	2012 Chartres	50 m backstroke
Bronze medal – third place	2012 Chartres	100 m backstroke
Bronze medal – third place	2012 Chartres	200 m backstroke
Bronze medal – third place	2013 Herning	4x50 m mixed medley
Summer Universiade
Silver medal – second place	2015 Gwangju	200 m backstroke

Simona Kubová (née Baumrtová; Czech pronunciation: [ˈsɪmona ˈkubovaː ˈbaumr̩tovaː], born 24 August 1991) is a Czech swimmer most successfully competing in backstroke events. Kubová is the first Czech female to swim 100 metre backstroke in long course swimming pool under one minute.

== Biography ==
Simona Baumrtová was born and raised in Chomutov, where she was coached by her father Tomáš Baumrt. She was originally interested in gymnastics but switched to swimming after suffering from spondylolisthesis. While competing in various events, including individual medley, Baumrtová achieved the most success in backstroke events, both in long and short course.

At 2010 European Short Course Championships in Eindhoven, Baumrtová won a bronze medal in 50-metre backstroke. A year later in Szczecin, she won again a bronze medal in the same event clocking 26.94, a national record. In May 2012 at long-course European championships in Debrecen, Baumrtová was third in 100-metre backstroke in another national record of 1:00.57.

At 2012 Summer Olympics in London, Simona Baumrtová competed in 100-metre and 200-metre backstroke. In both events, she set new national records in heats — 59.99 and 2:10.03 — advanced to semi-finals but did not manage to reach the finals and finished 10th and 14th respectively.

Later that year, she pushed down short-course national records in 50 m and 100 m backstroke to 26.83 and 57.73 respectively. At 2012 European Short Course Championships in Chartres, Baumrtová won three bronze medals in all three individual backstroke events and added silver medal in 4x50 medley relay. At 200-metre backstroke distance she cut off another 1.5 second from her national record.

Three weeks later at 2012 World Short Course Championships in Istanbul, Baumrtová won her first medal at the world stage by finishing third in 100 m backstroke and further pushing down her personal best to 57.18. She also finished 5th in 50-metre and 7th in 200-metre backstroke.

In 2013, Baumrtová won gold at the 2013 European Short Course Championship in the 50 m backstroke. At the same event, she also won silver in the 100 m and 200 m backstroke and bronze in the 4 x 50 m mixed medley relay.

She qualified for both the 2016 and 2020 Summer Olympics, but her 2016 Olympics were badly affected by episodes of cervicovestibular syndrome.

Kubová has won Czech swimmer of the Year six times.

== Personal life ==
She graduated at the Faculty of Physical Education and Sport, Charles University in Prague.

In August 2018, she married physiotherapist Kryštof Kuba and changed her surname to Kubová.

== Personal bests ==
Long course

- 50 m backstroke 27.78 NR (4 August 2018, Glasgow, United Kingdom)
- 100 m backstroke 59.65 NR (24 July 2017, Budapest, Hungary)
- 200 m backstroke 2:09.92 NR (13 June 2014, Rome, Italy)

Short course

- 50 m backstroke 26.22 NR (14 November 2020, Budapest, Hungary)
- 100 m backstroke 56.28 NR (13 December 2013, Herning, Denmark)
- 200 m backstroke 2:03.06 NR (15 December 2013, Herning, Denmark)
- 100 m individual medley 59.82 NR (28 November 2013, Plzeň, Czech Republic)
- 200 m individual medley 2:08.61 NR (29 November 2013, Plzeň, Czech Republic)

She was also part of the Czech teams that set national records:

Short course: in the 4 x 50 m freestyle relay (1:38.24) and 4 x 50 m medley relay (1:46.17), both set at the 2018 Short Course World Championships, and 4 x 200 m freestyle relay (7:52.89, set at the 2016 Short Course World Championships).

Long course: 4 x 100 m freestyle relay (3:40.78) set at the 2019 World Championships and 4 x 100 m medley relay (4:02.23) set at the 2017 World Championships.
