= Mimosa Jallow =

Finnish swimmer

Personal information
- Nationality: Finnish
- Born: 17 June 1994 (age 32) Jyväskylä, Finland

Sport
- Sport: Swimming
- Strokes: Backstroke
Medal record
Women's swimming
Representing Finland
European Championships (LC)
Bronze medal – third place	2016 London	4×100 m medley
Bronze medal – third place	2018 Glasgow	50 m backstroke

Mimosa Jallow (born 17 June 1994) is a Finnish swimmer. She competed in the women's 100 metre backstroke event at the 2016 Summer Olympics. Jallow was born to a Gambian father and a Finnish mother in Jyväskylä.
