= 2010 Pan Pacific Swimming Championships – Women's 100 metre backstroke =

Women's 100 metre backstroke at the 2010 Pan Pacific Swimming Championships
- Venue: William Woollett Jr. Aquatics Center
- Dates: August 18, 2010 (heats & finals)
- Competitors: 25 from 7 nations
- Winning time: 59.45

Medalists
gold medal	Emily Seebohm	Australia
silver medal	Aya Terakawa	Japan
bronze medal	Natalie Coughlin	United States

The women's 100 metre backstroke competition at the 2010 Pan Pacific Swimming Championships took place on August 18 at the William Woollett Jr. Aquatics Center. The last champion was Hanae Ito of Japan.

This race consisted of two lengths of the pool, all in backstroke.

== Records ==
Prior to this competition, the existing world and Pan Pacific records were as follows:

World record	Gemma Spofforth (GBR)	58.12	Rome, Italy	July 28, 2009
Pan Pacific Championships record	Natalie Coughlin (USA)	59.72	Yokohama, Japan	August 24, 2002

== Results ==
All times are in minutes and seconds.

KEY:	q	Fastest non-qualifiers	Q	Qualified	CR	Championships record	NR	National record	PB	Personal best	SB	Seasonal best

=== Heats ===
The first round was held on August 18, at 10:48.

Rank	Heat	Lane	Name	Nationality	Time	Notes
1	4	4	Emily Seebohm	Australia	59.62	QA, CR
2	4	3	Natalie Coughlin	United States	59.89	QA
3	3	6	Sophie Edington	Australia	1:00.34	QA
4	2	4	Aya Terakawa	Japan	1:00.41	QA
5	2	5	Belinda Hocking	Australia	1:00.51	QA
6	3	3	Missy Franklin	United States	1:00.56	QA
7	3	4	Shiho Sakai	Japan	1:00.58	QA
8	4	5	Elizabeth Pelton	United States	1:00.63	QA
9	4	6	Miyuki Takemura	Japan	1:00.81	QB
10	3	5	Fabíola Molina	Brazil	1:00.82	QB
11	4	1	Julia Wilkinson	Canada	1:00.87	QB
12	2	3	Rachel Bootsma	United States	1:01.10	QB
13	4	2	Elizabeth Beisel	United States	1:01.20	QB
13	1	2	Katy Murdoch	Canada	1:01.20	QB
15	1	6	Marie Kamimura	Japan	1:01.23	QB
16	2	7	Emily Thomas	New Zealand	1:01.55	QB
17	2	2	Grace Loh	Australia	1:01.62	
18	3	2	Sinead Russell	Canada	1:01.65	
19	3	7	Melissa Ingram	New Zealand	1:01.75	
20	1	4	Dominique Bouchard	Canada	1:02.63	
20	1	5	Genevieve Cantin	Canada	1:02.63	
22	4	8	Lauren Lavigna	Canada	1:02.64	
23	3	1	Fernanda Alvarenga	Brazil	1:03.72	
24	1	3	Lau Yin-Yan	Hong Kong	1:04.18	
25	2	1	Hannah Riordan	Canada	1:04.19	

=== B Final ===
The B final was held on August 18, at 19:10.

Rank	Lane	Name	Nationality	Time	Notes
9	5	Elizabeth Pelton	United States	1:00.15	
10	4	Belinda Hocking	Australia	1:00.65	
11	7	Sinead Russell	Canada	1:01.21	
12	3	Miyuki Takemura	Japan	1:01.65	
13	2	Emily Thomas	New Zealand	1:01.93	
14	6	Katy Murdoch	Canada	1:01.98	
15	8	Lau Yin-Yan	Hong Kong	1:03.66	
16	1	Fernanda Alvarenga	Brazil	1:04.29	

=== A Final ===
The A final was held on August 18, at 19:10.

Rank	Lane	Name	Nationality	Time	Notes
1st place, gold medalist(s)	4	Emily Seebohm	Australia	59.45	CR
2nd place, silver medalist(s)	6	Aya Terakawa	Japan	59.59	
3rd place, bronze medalist(s)	5	Natalie Coughlin	United States	59.70	
4	2	Missy Franklin	United States	1:00.16	
5	8	Julia Wilkinson	Canada	1:00.44	
6	3	Sophie Edington	Australia	1:00.54	
7	7	Shiho Sakai	Japan	1:00.68	
8	1	Fabíola Molina	Brazil	1:02.02	
