= 2010 Pan Pacific Swimming Championships – Women's 50 metre backstroke =

Women's 50 metre backstroke at the 2010 Pan Pacific Swimming Championships
- Venue: William Woollett Jr. Aquatics Center
- Dates: August 19, 2010 (heats & finals)
- Competitors: 20 from 7 nations
- Winning time: 27.83

Medalists
gold medal	Sophie Edington	Australia
silver medal	Aya Terakawa	Japan
bronze medal	Emily Thomas	New Zealand
bronze medal	Fabíola Molina	Brazil
bronze medal	Rachel Bootsma	United States

The women's 50 metre backstroke competition at the 2010 Pan Pacific Swimming Championships took place on August 19 at the William Woollett Jr. Aquatics Center. It was the first appearance of this event in the Pan Pacific Swimming Championships.

== Records ==
Prior to this competition, the existing world record was as follows:

World record	Zhao Jing (CHN)	27.06	Rome, Italy	July 30, 2009

== Results ==
All times are in minutes and seconds.

KEY:	q	Fastest non-qualifiers	Q	Qualified	CR	Championships record	NR	National record	PB	Personal best	SB	Seasonal best

=== Heats ===
The first round was held on August 19, at 11:32.

Rank	Heat	Lane	Name	Nationality	Time	Notes
1	3	4	Sophie Edington	Australia	28.12	QA
2	2	5	Aya Terakawa	Japan	28.17	QA
3	3	5	Fabíola Molina	Brazil	28.30	QA
3	3	6	Rachel Bootsma	United States	28.35	QA
5	1	3	Grace Loh	Australia	28.39	QA
6	2	4	Emily Seebohm	Australia	28.44	QA
7	2	6	Julia Wilkinson	Canada	28.47	QA
8	1	5	Emily Thomas	New Zealand	28.49	QA
9	3	3	Belinda Hocking	Australia	28.73	QB
10	1	4	Shiho Sakai	Japan	28.76	QB
11	2	3	Miyuki Takemura	Japan	28.79	QB
12	3	2	Elizabeth Pelton	United States	28.87	QB
13	3	7	Missy Franklin	United States	29.01	QB
14	1	2	Katy Murdoch	Canada	29.26	QB
15	1	6	Marie Kamimura	Japan	29.39	QB
15	2	7	Sinead Russell	Canada	29.39	QB
17	1	1	Julyana Kury	Brazil	29.89	
18	3	8	Dominique Bouchard	Canada	30.15	
19	2	2	Fernanda Alvarenga	Brazil	30.19	
20	2	1	Lau Yin-Yan	Hong Kong	30.29	
-	1	7	Meagen Nay	Australia	DNS	
-	3	1	Stephanie Rice	Australia	DNS	

=== B Final ===
The B final was held on August 19, at 19:39.

Rank	Lane	Name	Nationality	Time	Notes
9	4	Emily Seebohm	Australia	28.30	
10	3	Missy Franklin	United States	28.58	
11	5	Miyuki Takemura	Japan	28.74	
12	6	Katy Murdoch	Canada	29.07	
13	8	Sinead Russell	Canada	29.11	
14	2	Julyana Kury	Brazil	29.80	
15	7	Fernanda Alvarenga	Brazil	29.90	
16	1	Lau Yin-Yan	Hong Kong	30.43	

=== A Final ===
The A final was held on August 19, at 19:39.

Rank	Lane	Name	Nationality	Time	Notes
1st place, gold medalist(s)	4	Sophie Edington	Australia	27.83	
2nd place, silver medalist(s)	5	Aya Terakawa	Japan	28.04	
3rd place, bronze medalist(s)	1	Emily Thomas	New Zealand	28.44	
3rd place, bronze medalist(s)	3	Fabíola Molina	Brazil	28.44	
3rd place, bronze medalist(s)	6	Rachel Bootsma	United States	28.44	
6	2	Grace Loh	Australia	28.45	
7	7	Julia Wilkinson	Canada	28.55	
8	8	Shiho Sakai	Japan	28.75	
