= 2014 Pan Pacific Swimming Championships – Women's 100 metre backstroke =

Women's 100 metre backstroke at the 2014 Pan Pacific Swimming Championships
- Venue: Gold Coast Aquatic Centre
- Dates: August 21, 2014 (heats & finals)
- Competitors: 21
- Winning time: 58.84

Medalists
gold medal	Emily Seebohm	Australia
silver medal	Belinda Hocking	Australia
bronze medal	Missy Franklin	United States

The women's 100 metre backstroke competition at the 2014 Pan Pacific Swimming Championships took place on August 21 at the Gold Coast Aquatic Centre. The last champion was Emily Seebohm of Australia.

This race consisted of two lengths of the pool, all in backstroke.

== Records ==
Prior to this competition, the existing world and Pan Pacific records were as follows:

World record	Gemma Spofforth (GBR)	58.12	Rome, Italy	July 28, 2009
Pan Pacific Championships record	Emily Seebohm (AUS)	59.45	Irvine, United States	August 18, 2010

== Results ==
All times are in minutes and seconds.

KEY:	q	Fastest non-qualifiers	Q	Qualified	CR	Championships record	NR	National record	PB	Personal best	SB	Seasonal best

=== Heats ===
The first round was held on August 21, at 10:55.

Rank	Name	Nationality	Time	Notes
1	Emily Seebohm	Australia	59.72	QA
2	Belinda Hocking	Australia	1:00.46	QA
3	Missy Franklin	United States	1:00.60	QA
4	Elizabeth Pelton	United States	1:01.05	QA
5	Kathleen Baker	United States	1:01.09	QA
6	Dominique Bouchard	Canada	1:01.10	QA
7	Rachel Bootsma	United States	1:01.27	QA
8	Hilary Caldwell	Canada	1:01.34	QA
9	Brooklynn Snodgrass	Canada	1:01.54	QB
9	Miyuki Takemura	Japan	1:01.54	QB
11	Sayaka Akase	Japan	1:01.72	QB
12	Etiene Medeiros	Brazil	1:01.81	QB
13	Shiho Sakai	Japan	1:01.86	QB
14	Genevieve Cantin	Canada	1:02.03	QB
15	Kendyl Stewart	United States	1:02.08	QB
16	Zhao Ying	China	1:02.99	QB
17	Lisa Bratton	United States	1:03.19	
18	Claudia Lau	Hong Kong	1:04.12	
19	Marie Kamimura	Japan	1:04.27	
20	Marce Loubser	South Africa	1:05.37	
21	Beatrix Malan	South Africa	1:06.22	

=== B Final ===
The B final was held on August 21, at 20:06.

Rank	Name	Nationality	Time	Notes
9	Kathleen Baker	United States	1:00.35	
10	Brooklynn Snodgrass	Canada	1:00.57	
11	Etiene Medeiros	Brazil	1:00.82	
12	Shiho Sakai	Japan	1:01.86	
13	Zhao Ying	China	1:02.88	
14	Claudia Lau	Hong Kong	1:03.43	
15	Marce Loubser	South Africa	1:04.95	
16	Beatrix Malan	South Africa	1:05.66	

=== A Final ===
The A final was held on August 21, at 20:06.

Rank	Name	Nationality	Time	Notes
1st place, gold medalist(s)	Emily Seebohm	Australia	58.84	CR
2nd place, silver medalist(s)	Belinda Hocking	Australia	59.78	
3rd place, bronze medalist(s)	Missy Franklin	United States	1:00.30	
4	Sayaka Akase	Japan	1:00.65	
5	Dominique Bouchard	Canada	1:00.82	
6	Hilary Caldwell	Canada	1:00.99	
7	Elizabeth Pelton	United States	1:01.37	
8	Miyuki Takemura	Japan	1:01.88	
