= Swimming at the 2010 Commonwealth Games – Women's 100 metre backstroke =

Event at the 2010 Commonwealth Games

The Women's 100 metre backstroke event at the 2010 Commonwealth Games took place on 5 and 6 October 2010, at the SPM Swimming Pool Complex.

Four heats were held, with both containing the seven swimmers. The heat in which a swimmer competed did not formally matter for advancement, as the swimmers with the top sixteen times advanced to the semifinals and the top eight times from there qualified for the finals.

== Heats ==
=== Heat 1 ===
Rank	Lane	Name	Nationality	Time	Notes
1	3	Fariha Zaman	India	01:10.38	
2	4	Talisa Lanoe	Kenya	01:13.19	
3	5	Kristie Millar	Malawi	01:20.83	

=== Heat 2 ===
Rank	Lane	Name	Nationality	Time	Notes
1	3	Georgia Davies	Wales	01:01.63	Q
2	4	Gemma Spofforth	England	01:01.68	Q
3	5	Sophie Edington	Australia	01:01.88	Q
4	6	Lauren Lavigna	Canada	01:02.58	Q
5	2	Jennifer Oldham	Wales	01:05.64	
6	1	Jade Howard	Zambia	01:09.35	
7	7	Siona Huxley	Saint Lucia	01:12.85	

=== Heat 3 ===
Rank	Lane	Name	Nationality	Time	Notes
1	4	Elizabeth Simmonds	England	01:01.05	Q
2	3	Sinead Russell	Canada	01:01.49	Q
3	6	Melissa Ingram	New Zealand	01:01.51	Q
4	5	Emily Thomas	New Zealand	01:01.77	Q
5	2	Melanie Nocher	Northern Ireland	01:03.53	Q
6	7	Kah Chan	Malaysia	01:05.48	Q
7	1	Jyotsna Pansare	India	01:10.07	

=== Heat 4 ===
Rank	Lane	Name	Nationality	Time	Notes
1	5	Belinda Hocking	Australia	01:00.87	Q
2	4	Emily Seebohm	Australia	01:00.90	Q
3	6	Stephanie Proud	England	01:01.68	Q
4	3	Julia Wilkinson	Canada	01:01.71	Q
5	2	Kiera Aitken	Bermuda	01:04.82	Q
6	7	Chelsey Wilson	Northern Ireland	01:05.23	Q
7	1	Alexia Royal-Eatmon	Jamaica	01:08.67	
8	8	Rachel Fortunato	Gibraltar	01:15.10	

== Semifinals ==
=== Semifinal 1 ===
Rank	Lane	Name	Nationality	Time	Notes
1	4	Emily Seebohm	Australia	01:00.28	Q, CG
2	5	Sinead Russell	Canada	01:01.07	Q
3	3	Georgia Davies	Wales	01:01.14	Q
4	6	Stephanie Proud	England	01:01.25	
5	2	Emily Thomas	New Zealand	01:01.58	
6	7	Lauren Lavigna	Canada	01:02.08	
7	1	Kiera Aitken	Bermuda	01:04.87	
8	8	Kah Chan	Malaysia	01:05.80	

=== Semifinal 2 ===
Rank	Lane	Name	Nationality	Time	Notes
1	4	Belinda Hocking	Australia	01:00.71	Q
2	7	Sophie Edington	Australia	01:00.80	Q
3	2	Julia Wilkinson	Canada	01:00.82	Q
4	3	Melissa Ingram	New Zealand	01:00.92	Q
5	6	Gemma Spofforth	England	01:01.05	Q
6	5	Elizabeth Simmonds	England	01:01.42	
7	1	Melanie Nocher	Northern Ireland	01:02.60	
8	8	Chelsey Wilson	Northern Ireland	01:04.60	

== Final ==
Rank	Lane	Name	Nationality	Time	Notes
1st place, gold medalist(s)	4	Emily Seebohm	Australia	59.79	CG
2nd place, silver medalist(s)	7	Gemma Spofforth	England	01:00.02	
3rd place, bronze medalist(s)	6	Julia Wilkinson	Canada	01:00.74	
4	3	Sophie Edington	Australia	01:00.81	
4	5	Belinda Hocking	Australia	01:00.81	
6	8	Georgia Davies	Wales	01:01.05	
7	2	Melissa Ingram	New Zealand	01:01.14	
8	1	Sinead Russell	Canada	01:01.42	
