= Swimming at the 2010 Commonwealth Games – Women's 50 metre backstroke =

The Women's 50 metre backstroke event at the 2010 Commonwealth Games took place on 7 and 8 October 2010, at the SPM Swimming Pool Complex.

Five heats were held, with most containing the maximum number of swimmers (eight). The top sixteen advanced to the semifinals and the top eight from there qualified for the finals.

== Heats summary ==
Rank	Heat	Lane	Name	Nationality	Time	Notes
1	1	5	Gemma Spofforth	England	28.30	Q
2	4	4	Emily Seebohm	Australia	28.72	Q
3	3	4	Grace Loh	Australia	28.78	Q
4	3	5	Julia Wilkinson	Canada	29.04	Q
5	5	4	Sophie Edington	Australia	29.07	Q
6	5	5	Emily Thomas	New Zealand	29.17	Q
7	4	5	Georgia Davies	Wales	29.19	Q
8	4	3	Sinead Russell	Canada	29.21	Q
9	3	3	Emma Saunders	England	29.68	Q
10	4	6	Kiera Aitken	Bermuda	30.12	Q
11	5	2	Lauren Lavigna	Canada	30.17	Q
12	3	2	Kah Chan	Malaysia	30.41	Q
13	5	6	Jennifer Oldham	Wales	30.58	Q
14	4	1	Anna-Liza Mopio-Jane	Papua New Guinea	31.18	Q
15	1	3	Fariha Zaman	India	31.34	Q
16	3	7	Chelsey Wilson	Northern Ireland	31.60	Q

== Semifinals ==
=== Semifinal 1 ===
Rank	Lane	Name	Nationality	Time	Notes
1	4	Emily Seebohm	Australia	28.03	Q, CG
2	5	Julia Wilkinson	Canada	28.65	Q
3	3	Emily Thomas	New Zealand	28.85	Q
4	6	Sinead Russell	Canada	29.09	Q
5	2	Kiera Aitken	Bermuda	30.06	
6	7	Jennifer Oldham	Wales	30.20	
7	1	Fariha Zaman	India	31.35	
8	8	Alexia Royal-Eatmon	Jamaica	31.41	

=== Semifinal 2 ===
Rank	Lane	Name	Nationality	Time	Notes
1	4	Gemma Spofforth	England	28.29	Q
2	6	Georgia Davies	Wales	28.45	Q
3	3	Sophie Edington	Australia	28.53	Q
4	5	Grace Loh	Australia	28.72	Q
5	2	Emma Saunders	England	29.59	
6	7	Kah Chan	Malaysia	30.19	
7	1	Anna-Liza Mopio-Jane	Papua New Guinea	31.03	
8	8	Chelsey Wilson	Northern Ireland	31.24	

== Final ==
Rank	Lane	Name	Nationality	Time	Notes
1st place, gold medalist(s)	6	Sophie Edington	Australia	28.00	CG
2nd place, silver medalist(s)	5	Gemma Spofforth	England	28.03	
3rd place, bronze medalist(s)	3	Georgia Davies	Wales	28.33	
3rd place, bronze medalist(s)	4	Emily Seebohm	Australia	28.33	
5	7	Grace Loh	Australia	28.66	
6	2	Julia Wilkinson	Canada	28.76	
7	1	Emily Thomas	New Zealand	29.02	
8	8	Sinead Russell	Canada	29.14	
