= Swimming at the 2012 Summer Olympics – Women's 100 metre backstroke =

Women's 100 metre backstroke at the Games of the XXX Olympiad
- Venue: London Aquatics Centre
- Date: July 29, 2012 (heats & semifinals); July 30, 2012 (final)
- Competitors: 45 from 38 nations
- Winning time: 58.33 AM

Medalists
1st place, gold medalist(s)		Missy Franklin	United States
2nd place, silver medalist(s)		Emily Seebohm	Australia
3rd place, bronze medalist(s)		Aya Terakawa	Japan

The women's 100 metre backstroke event at the 2012 Summer Olympics took place on 29–30 July at the London Aquatics Centre in London, United Kingdom.

At only 17 years of age, U.S. teenage sensation Missy Franklin, billed as "Missy the Missile" by her fans, stormed home on the final stretch to pick up her first ever Olympic gold medal in swimming. Trailing behind at the halfway turn, she pulled away from a tightly packed field with a more destructive force to hit the wall first in an American record of 58.33. Australia's Emily Seebohm started the race with a marginal lead over the rest of the field, but faded down the stretch to settle only for the silver in 58.68. Meanwhile, Japan's Aya Terakawa grabbed the bronze in an Asian record of 58.83, holding off the fast-charging Russian swimmer Anastasia Zuyeva to a fourth spot in 59.00.

Great Britain's Gemma Spofforth, the reigning world record holder, finished fifth in 59.20, while China's Zhao Jing (59.23), Australia's Belinda Hocking (59.29) and Zhao's teammate Fu Yuanhui (1:00.50) rounded out the field.

Earlier in the prelims, Seebohm blitzed the field from heat four to lead all swimmers with a sterling Olympic and Oceanian record in 58.23, shaving 0.54 seconds off the standard set by Zimbabwe's Kirsty Coventry in Beijing four years earlier. Coventry, double Olympic silver medalist, missed a chance to reach the final roster with a fourteenth-place effort (1:00.39) from the semifinals.

== Records ==
Prior to this competition, the existing world and Olympic records were as follows.

World record	Gemma Spofforth (GBR)	58.12	Rome, Italy	28 July 2009
Olympic record	Kirsty Coventry (ZIM)	58.77	Beijing, China	11 August 2008

The following records were established during the competition:

Date	Event	Name	Nationality	Time	Record
July 29	Heat 4	Emily Seebohm	Australia	58.23	OR

== Results ==
=== Heats ===
Rank	Heat	Lane	Name	Nationality	Time	Notes
1	4	5	Emily Seebohm	Australia	58.23	Q, OR, OC
2	6	4	Missy Franklin	United States	59.37	Q
3	6	3	Belinda Hocking	Australia	59.61	Q
4	6	5	Aya Terakawa	Japan	59.82	Q
5	5	4	Anastasia Zuyeva	Russia	59.88	Q
6	4	6	Georgia Davies	Great Britain	59.92	Q
7	5	6	Julia Wilkinson	Canada	59.94	Q
8	6	2	Fu Yuanhui	China	59.96	Q
9	4	4	Zhao Jing	China	59.97	Q
10	6	8	Simona Baumrtová	Czech Republic	59.99	Q, NR
11	5	5	Rachel Bootsma	United States	1:00.03	Q
12	5	7	Gemma Spofforth	Great Britain	1:00.05	Q
13	5	3	Sinead Russell	Canada	1:00.10	Q
14	6	1	Alexianne Castel	France	1:00.16	Q
15	4	8	Kirsty Coventry	Zimbabwe	1:00.24	Q
16	4	7	Arianna Barbieri	Italy	1:00.25	Q, NR
17	4	3	Mie Nielsen	Denmark	1:00.38	
18	4	1	Duane da Rocha	Spain	1:00.57	
18	5	2	Daryna Zevina	Ukraine	1:00.57	
20	4	2	Sharon van Rouwendaal	Netherlands	1:00.61	
21	6	6	Jenny Mensing	Germany	1:00.72	
22	6	7	Laure Manaudou	France	1:01.03	
23	3	4	Maria Fernanda Gonzalez	Mexico	1:01.28	
24	5	1	Fabíola Molina	Brazil	1:01.40	
25	3	5	Alicja Tchórz	Poland	1:01.44	
26	2	8	Tao Li	Singapore	1:01.60	NR
27	5	8	Elena Gemo	Italy	1:01.77	
28	3	2	Carolina Colorado Henao	Colombia	1:01.81	
29	3	8	Kimberly Buys	Belgium	1:01.92	NR
30	3	7	Melissa Ingram	New Zealand	1:01.94	
31	3	6	Ekaterina Avramova	Bulgaria	1:02.20	
32	2	3	Eygló Ósk Gústafsdóttir	Iceland	1:02.40	NR
33	2	4	Melanie Nocher	Ireland	1:02.44	
34	2	1	Anja Čarman	Slovenia	1:02.68	
35	3	1	Therese Svendsen	Sweden	1:03.11	
36	2	5	Sanja Jovanović	Croatia	1:03.38	
37	2	6	Eszter Povázsay	Hungary	1:03.55	
38	2	7	Yekaterina Rudenko	Kazakhstan	1:03.64	
39	3	3	Hoi Shun Stephanie Au	Hong Kong	1:04.31	
40	2	2	Hazal Sarikaya	Turkey	1:04.80	
41	1	3	Karen Vilorio	Honduras	1:06.38	
42	1	4	Monica Ramirez	Andorra	1:07.72	
43	1	5	Ines Remersaro	Uruguay	1:08.03	
44	1	6	Anahit Barseghyan	Armenia	1:08.19	
45	1	2	Angelique Trinquier	Monaco	1:10.79	

=== Semifinals ===
==== Semifinal 1 ====
Rank	Lane	Name	Nationality	Time	Notes
1	4	Missy Franklin	United States	59.12	Q
2	5	Aya Terakawa	Japan	59.34	Q
3	7	Gemma Spofforth	Great Britain	59.70	Q
4	6	Fu Yuanhui	China	59.82	Q
5	2	Simona Baumrtová	Czech Republic	1:00.02	
6	1	Alexianne Castel	France	1:00.24	
7	8	Arianna Barbieri	Italy	1:00.27	
8	3	Georgia Davies	Great Britain	1:00.56	

==== Semifinal 2 ====
Rank	Lane	Name	Nationality	Time	Notes
1	4	Emily Seebohm	Australia	58.39	Q
2	2	Zhao Jing	China	59.55	Q
3	3	Anastasia Zuyeva	Russia	59.68	Q
4	5	Belinda Hocking	Australia	59.79	Q
5	6	Julia Wilkinson	Canada	59.91	
6	7	Rachel Bootsma	United States	1:00.04	
7	8	Kirsty Coventry	Zimbabwe	1:00.39	
8	1	Sinead Russell	Canada	1:00.57	

=== Final ===
Rank	Lane	Name	Nationality	Time	Notes
1st place, gold medalist(s)	5	Missy Franklin	United States	58.33	AM
2nd place, silver medalist(s)	4	Emily Seebohm	Australia	58.68	
3rd place, bronze medalist(s)	3	Aya Terakawa	Japan	58.83	AS
4	2	Anastasia Zuyeva	Russia	59.00	
5	7	Gemma Spofforth	Great Britain	59.20	
6	6	Zhao Jing	China	59.23	
7	1	Belinda Hocking	Australia	59.29	
8	8	Fu Yuanhui	China	1:00.50	
