= Swimming at the 2013 World Aquatics Championships – Women's 100 metre backstroke =

Women's 100 metre backstroke at the 2013 World Aquatics Championships
- Venue: Palau Sant Jordi
- Date: July 29, 2013 (heats & semifinals); July 30, 2013 (final)
- Competitors: 50 from 43 nations
- Winning time: 58.42

Medalists
| gold medal | Missy Franklin | United States |
| silver medal | Emily Seebohm | Australia |
| bronze medal | Aya Terakawa | Japan |

Barcelona Palau San Jordi

The women's 100 metre backstroke event in swimming at the 2013 World Aquatics Championships took place on 29–30 July at the Palau Sant Jordi in Barcelona, Spain.

== Records ==
Prior to this competition, the existing world and championship records were:

| World record | Gemma Spofforth (GBR) | 58.12 | Rome, Italy | 28 July 2009 |
| Competition record | Gemma Spofforth (GBR) | 58.12 | Rome, Italy | 28 July 2009 |

== Results ==
=== Heats ===
The heats were held at 10:00.

| Rank | Heat | Lane | Name | Nationality | Time | Notes |
|---|---|---|---|---|---|---|
| 1 | 4 | 4 | Missy Franklin | United States | 59.13 | Q |
| 2 | 4 | 6 | Katinka Hosszú | Hungary | 59.40 | Q, NR, WD |
| 3 | 5 | 5 | Elizabeth Pelton | United States | 59.94 | Q |
| 4 | 3 | 5 | Fu Yuanhui | China | 1:00.01 | Q |
| 5 | 5 | 4 | Emily Seebohm | Australia | 1:00.02 | Q |
| 6 | 4 | 3 | Simona Baumrtová | Czech Republic | 1:00.05 | Q |
| 7 | 3 | 4 | Aya Terakawa | Japan | 1:00.09 | Q |
| 8 | 5 | 3 | Sinead Russell | Canada | 1:00.17 | Q |
| 9 | 4 | 5 | Belinda Hocking | Australia | 1:00.39 | Q |
| 10 | 5 | 2 | Daryna Zevina | Ukraine | 1:00.43 | Q |
| 11 | 4 | 2 | Cloe Credeville | France | 1:00.70 | Q |
| 12 | 3 | 6 | Duane Da Rocha | Spain | 1:00.80 | Q |
| 13 | 4 | 7 | Zhou Yanxin | China | 1:00.99 | Q |
| 14 | 3 | 1 | Mercedes Peris | Spain | 1:01.19 | Q |
| 15 | 3 | 3 | Lauren Quigley | Great Britain | 1:01.23 | Q |
| 16 | 3 | 0 | Karin Prinsloo | South Africa | 1:01.25 | Q |
| 17 | 4 | 1 | Kimberly Buys | Belgium | 1:01.35 | Q |
| 18 | 5 | 0 | Carolina Colorado Henao | Colombia | 1:01.41 | |
| 19 | 5 | 6 | Georgia Davies | Great Britain | 1:01.61 | |
| 20 | 5 | 1 | Eygló Ósk Gústafsdóttir | Iceland | 1:01.71 | |
| 21 | 3 | 7 | Etiene Medeiros | Brazil | 1:01.75 | |
| 22 | 5 | 9 | Klaudia Nazieblo | Poland | 1:01.77 | |
| 23 | 5 | 8 | María Fernanda González | Mexico | 1:01.84 | |
| 24 | 1 | 9 | Daria Ustinova | Russia | 1:02.04 | |
| 25 | 2 | 5 | Stephanie Au | Hong Kong | 1:02.10 | |
| 26 | 2 | 6 | Gisela Morales | Guatemala | 1:02.12 | |
| 27 | 3 | 9 | Yekaterina Rudenko | Kazakhstan | 1:02.49 | |
| 28 | 3 | 2 | Sayaka Akase | Japan | 1:02.51 | |
| 29 | 4 | 9 | Ekaterina Avramova | Bulgaria | 1:02.79 | |
| 30 | 2 | 4 | Halime Zeren | Turkey | 1:02.91 | |
| 31 | 4 | 8 | Selina Hocke | Germany | 1:02.94 | |
| 32 | 5 | 7 | Kristina Steins | Canada | 1:03.15 | |
| 33 | 3 | 8 | Tao Li | Singapore | 1:03.31 | |
| 34 | 2 | 8 | Zanre Oberholzer | Namibia | 1:03.36 | |
| 35 | 2 | 3 | Yulduz Kuchkarova | Uzbekistan | 1:03.54 | |
| 36 | 2 | 9 | Tatiana Perstniova | Moldova | 1:03.59 | |
| 37 | 4 | 0 | Kim Ji-Hyun | South Korea | 1:04.66 | |
| 38 | 2 | 1 | Karen Vilorio | Honduras | 1:04.79 | |
| 39 | 2 | 2 | McKayla Lightbourn | Bahamas | 1:04.97 | |
| 40 | 2 | 0 | Birita Debes | Faroe Islands | 1:05.64 | NR |
| 41 | 2 | 7 | Inés Remersaro | Uruguay | 1:06.70 | |
| 42 | 1 | 4 | Siona Huxley | Saint Lucia | 1:09.05 | |
| 43 | 1 | 3 | Evelina Afoa | Samoa | 1:09.11 | |
| 44 | 1 | 5 | Kuan Weng I | Macau | 1:09.70 | |
| 44 | 1 | 6 | Nadeera Jayasekera | Sri Lanka | 1:09.70 | |
| 46 | 1 | 7 | Caylee Watson | (United States Virgin Islands) Virgin Islands | 1:09.90 | NR |
| 47 | 1 | 2 | Elvira Hasanova | Azerbaijan | 1:10.47 | |
| 48 | 1 | 8 | Nur Hamizah Ahmad | Brunei | 1:13.25 | |
| 49 | 1 | 1 | Altansukh Nomin | Mongolia | 1:18.95 | |
| 50 | 1 | 0 | Vivie Geneva Chamberlain | Laos | 1:29.16 | |

=== Semifinals ===
The semifinals were held at 18:55.

==== Semifinal 1 ====
| Rank | Lane | Name | Nationality | Time | Notes |
|---|---|---|---|---|---|
| 1 | 5 | Emily Seebohm | Australia | 59.38 | Q |
| 2 | 4 | Elizabeth Pelton | United States | 59.44 | Q |
| 3 | 3 | Aya Terakawa | Japan | 59.80 | Q |
| 4 | 6 | Belinda Hocking | Australia | 1:00.24 | Q |
| 5 | 7 | Zhou Yanxin | China | 1:00.85 | |
| 6 | 1 | Lauren Quigley | Great Britain | 1:00.96 | |
| 7 | 2 | Cloe Credeville | France | 1:01.16 | |
| 8 | 8 | Kimberly Buys | Belgium | 1:01.24 | |

==== Semifinal 2 ====
| Rank | Lane | Name | Nationality | Time | Notes |
|---|---|---|---|---|---|
| 1 | 4 | Missy Franklin | United States | 59.31 | Q |
| 2 | 5 | Fu Yuanhui | China | 59.82 | Q |
| 3 | 2 | Daryna Zevina | Ukraine | 59.90 | Q, NR |
| 4 | 3 | Simona Baumrtová | Czech Republic | 59.99 | Q, =NR |
| 5 | 6 | Sinead Russell | Canada | 1:00.37 | |
| 6 | 7 | Duane Da Rocha | Spain | 1:00.53 | |
| 7 | 8 | Karin Prinsloo | South Africa | 1:01.05 | |
| 8 | 1 | Mercedes Peris | Spain | 1:01.59 | |

=== Final ===
The final was held at 18:10.

| Rank | Lane | Name | Nationality | Time | Notes |
|---|---|---|---|---|---|
| 1st place, gold medalist(s) | 4 | Missy Franklin | United States | 58.42 | |
| 2nd place, silver medalist(s) | 5 | Emily Seebohm | Australia | 59.06 | |
| 3rd place, bronze medalist(s) | 6 | Aya Terakawa | Japan | 59.23 | |
| 4 | 3 | Elizabeth Pelton | United States | 59.45 | |
| 5 | 2 | Fu Yuanhui | China | 59.61 | |
| 6 | 1 | Simona Baumrtová | Czech Republic | 59.84 | NR |
| 7 | 7 | Daryna Zevina | Ukraine | 1:00.16 | |
| 8 | 8 | Belinda Hocking | Australia | 1:00.29 | |
