= 2018 FINA World Swimming Championships (25 m) – Women's 50 metre backstroke =

Women's 50 metre backstroke at the 2018 FINA World Swimming Championships (25 m)
- Venue: Hangzhou Sports Park Stadium
- Dates: 14 December (heats and semifinals); 15 December (final)
- Competitors: 57
- Winning time: 25.88

Medalists
| gold medal | Olivia Smoliga | United States |
| silver medal | Caroline Pilhatsch | Austria |
| bronze medal | Holly Barratt | Australia |

The women's 50 metre backstroke competition of the 2018 FINA World Swimming Championships (25 m) was held on 14 and 15 December 2018.

== Records ==
Prior to the competition, the existing world and championship records were as follows.

| | Name | Nation | Time | Location | Date |
|---|---|---|---|---|---|
| World record Championship record | Etiene Medeiros | Brazil | 25.67 | Doha | 7 December 2014 |

== Results ==
=== Heats ===
The heats were started on 14 December at 9:38.

| Rank | Heat | Lane | Name | Nationality | Time | Notes |
|---|---|---|---|---|---|---|
| 1 | 5 | 4 | Etiene Medeiros | Brazil | 26.13 | Q |
| 2 | 5 | 6 | Fu Yuanhui | China | 26.26 | Q |
| 3 | 6 | 3 | Olivia Smoliga | United States | 26.41 | Q |
| 4 | 3 | 4 | Maaike de Waard | Netherlands | 26.48 | Q |
| 5 | 5 | 7 | Caroline Pilhatsch | Austria | 26.51 | Q |
| 6 | 4 | 3 | Miyuki Takemura | Japan | 26.53 | Q |
| 7 | 4 | 5 | Georgia Davies | Great Britain | 26.56 | Q |
| 7 | 6 | 2 | Holly Barratt | Australia | 26.56 | Q |
| 9 | 5 | 2 | Mathilde Cini | France | 26.57 | Q |
| 10 | 5 | 3 | Simona Kubová | Czech Republic | 26.58 | Q |
| 11 | 4 | 6 | Mimosa Jallow | Finland | 26.60 | Q |
| 12 | 5 | 5 | Ranomi Kromowidjojo | Netherlands | 26.63 | Q |
| 13 | 6 | 1 | Anastasia Fesikova | Russia | 26.70 | Q |
| 14 | 6 | 5 | Alicja Tchórz | Poland | 26.74 | Q |
| 15 | 6 | 6 | Kathleen Baker | United States | 26.77 | Q |
| 16 | 4 | 4 | Emily Seebohm | Australia | 26.81 | Q |
| 17 | 3 | 6 | Karolína Hájková | Slovakia | 27.13 | |
| 18 | 4 | 2 | Liu Xiang | China | 27.21 | |
| 18 | 5 | 0 | Andrea Berrino | Argentina | 27.21 | |
| 20 | 4 | 0 | Laura Riedemann | Germany | 27.22 | |
| 21 | 3 | 2 | Ingrid Wilm | Canada | 27.25 | |
| 22 | 3 | 5 | Isabella Arcila | Colombia | 27.26 | |
| 23 | 5 | 8 | Anastasiya Shkurdai | Belarus | 27.40 | |
| 24 | 6 | 7 | Emi Moronuki | Japan | 27.50 | |
| 25 | 4 | 1 | Hanna Rosvall | Sweden | 27.54 | |
| 26 | 5 | 1 | Stephanie Au | Hong Kong | 27.57 | |
| 27 | 5 | 9 | Carlotta Zofkova | Italy | 27.62 | |
| 28 | 6 | 9 | Seraina Sturzenegger | Switzerland | 27.64 | |
| 29 | 4 | 8 | Ekaterina Avramova | Turkey | 27.81 | |
| 30 | 3 | 3 | Jeserik Pinto | Venezuela | 27.99 | NR |
| 30 | 4 | 9 | Ingibjörg Kristín Jónsdóttir | Iceland | 27.99 | |
| 32 | 6 | 0 | Paige Flynn | New Zealand | 28.20 | |
| 33 | 3 | 7 | Hiba Fahsi | Morocco | 29.22 | NR |
| 34 | 3 | 1 | Nimia Murua | Panama | 30.34 | |
| 35 | 3 | 8 | Guiliana Dudok | Uruguay | 30.74 | |
| 36 | 3 | 9 | Kimberly Ince | Grenada | 31.38 | |
| 37 | 1 | 1 | Britheny Joassaint | Haiti | 31.48 | NR |
| 38 | 3 | 0 | Eda Zeqiri | Kosovo | 31.55 | |
| 39 | 2 | 0 | Therese Soukup | Seychelles | 31.97 | |
| 40 | 2 | 4 | Jannat Bique | Mozambique | 32.05 | |
| 41 | 2 | 3 | Annie Hepler | Marshall Islands | 33.19 | |
| 42 | 1 | 6 | Naima Akter | Bangladesh | 33.86 | |
| 42 | 2 | 6 | Roylin Akiwo | Palau | 33.86 | |
| 44 | 2 | 8 | Daniela Costa | Angola | 34.01 | |
| 45 | 2 | 5 | Ada Thioune | Senegal | 34.32 | |
| 46 | 1 | 7 | Fatema Almahmeed | Brunei | 34.35 | |
| 47 | 1 | 5 | Noelani Day | Tonga | 34.45 | |
| 48 | 1 | 3 | Danielle George | Guyana | 34.74 | |
| 49 | 2 | 2 | Kayla Temba | Tanzania | 36.48 | |
| 50 | 2 | 9 | Ina Gadama | Malawi | 42.87 | |
| 51 | 1 | 2 | Kanu Isha | Sierra Leone | 48.97 | |
| 52 | 2 | 1 | R.B.A.Ibrahim | Sudan | 49.06 | |
| | 1 | 4 | Bopha Sam | Cambodia | DNS | |
| | 4 | 7 | Elena Di Liddo | Italy | DNS | |
| | 6 | 4 | Katinka Hosszú | Hungary | DNS | |
| | 6 | 8 | Jenna Laukkanen | Finland | DNS | |
| | 2 | 7 | Evalyn Tome | Solomon Islands | DSQ | |

=== Semifinals ===
The semifinals were started on 14 December at 20:15.

==== Semifinal 1 ====
| Rank | Lane | Name | Nationality | Time | Notes |
|---|---|---|---|---|---|
| 1 | 3 | Miyuki Takemura | Japan | 26.31 | Q |
| 2 | 4 | Fu Yuanhui | China | 26.33 | Q |
| 3 | 1 | Alicja Tchórz | Poland | 26.36 | Q |
| 4 | 6 | Holly Barratt | Australia | 26.38 | Q |
| 5 | 7 | Ranomi Kromowidjojo | Netherlands | 26.54 | QSO |
| 6 | 2 | Simona Kubová | Czech Republic | 26.60 | |
| 7 | 5 | Maaike de Waard | Netherlands | 26.74 | |
| 8 | 8 | Emily Seebohm | Australia | 26.93 | |

==== Semifinal 2 ====
| Rank | Lane | Name | Nationality | Time | Notes |
|---|---|---|---|---|---|
| 1 | 5 | Olivia Smoliga | United States | 26.06 | Q |
| 2 | 3 | Caroline Pilhatsch | Austria | 26.21 | Q |
| 3 | 6 | Georgia Davies | Great Britain | 26.28 | Q |
| 4 | 2 | Mathilde Cini | France | 26.54 | QSO |
| 5 | 7 | Mimosa Jallow | Finland | 26.74 | |
| 6 | 1 | Anastasia Fesikova | Russia | 26.76 | |
| 6 | 8 | Kathleen Baker | United States | 26.76 | |
| 8 | 4 | Etiene Medeiros | Brazil | 26.91 | |

=== Final ===
The final was held on 15 December at 20:10.

| Rank | Lane | Name | Nationality | Time | Notes |
|---|---|---|---|---|---|
| 1st place, gold medalist(s) | 4 | Olivia Smoliga | United States | 25.88 | NR |
| 2nd place, silver medalist(s) | 5 | Caroline Pilhatsch | Austria | 25.99 | NR |
| 3rd place, bronze medalist(s) | 1 | Holly Barratt | Australia | 26.04 | |
| 4 | 2 | Fu Yuanhui | China | 26.06 | |
| 5 | 8 | Mathilde Cini | France | 26.17 | |
| 6 | 6 | Miyuki Takemura | Japan | 26.30 | |
| 7 | 3 | Georgia Davies | Great Britain | 26.31 | |
| 8 | 7 | Alicja Tchórz | Poland | 26.42 | |
