= Swimming at the 2014 Commonwealth Games – Women's 4 × 100 metre medley relay =

Women's 4 × 100 metre medley relay at the 2014 Commonwealth Games
- Venue: Tollcross International Swimming Centre
- Dates: 29 July 2014
- Competitors: 54 from 9 nations
- Winning time: 3:56.23 GR

Medalists
gold medal	Emily Seebohm; Lorna Tonks; Emma McKeon; Cate Campbell; Belinda Hocking*; Sally Hunter*; Alicia Coutts*; Bronte Campbell*	Australia
silver medal	Lauren Quigley; Sophie Taylor; Siobhan-Marie O'Connor; Francesca Halsall; Elizabeth Simmonds*; Molly Renshaw*; Rachael Kelly*; Amy Smith*	England
bronze medal	Sinead Russell; Tera van Beilen; Katerine Savard; Sandrine Mainville; Kierra Smith*; Audrey Lacroix*; Michelle Williams*	Canada

The women's 4 × 100 metre medley relay event at the 2014 Commonwealth Games as part of the swimming programme took place on 29 July at the Tollcross International Swimming Centre in Glasgow, Scotland.

The medals were presented by Bruce Robertson, Vice-President of the Commonwealth Games Federation and the quaichs were presented by David Downie, President of Scottish Swimming.

== Records ==
Prior to this competition, the existing world and Commonwealth Games records were as follows.

World record	United States; Missy Franklin (58.50); Rebecca Soni (1:04.82); Dana Vollmer (55.48); Allison Schmitt (53.25)	3:52.05	London, United Kingdom	4 August 2012
Commonwealth record				
Games record	Australia; Sophie Edington (1:01.06); Leisel Jones (1:05.51); Jessicah Schipper (56.86); Libby Lenton (52.87)	3:56.30	Melbourne, Australia	21 March 2006

The following records were established during the competition:

Date	Event	Nation	Swimmers	Time	Record
29 July	Final	Australia	Emily Seebohm (59.41); Lorna Tonks (1:08.28); Emma McKeon (56.95); Cate Campbell (51.59)	3:56.23	GR

== Results ==
=== Heats ===
Rank	Heat	Lane	Nation	Swimmers	Time	Notes
1	2	4	Australia	Belinda Hocking (59.94); Sally Hunter (1:08.44); Alicia Coutts (57.59); Bronte Campbell (53.47)	3:59.44	Q
2	2	5	England	Elizabeth Simmonds (1:00.83); Molly Renshaw (1:10.46); Rachael Kelly (58.57); Amy Smith (54.70)	4:04.56	Q
3	1	4	Canada	Sinead Russell (1:00.61); Kierra Smith (1:10.80); Audrey Lacroix (1:00.89); Michelle Williams (54.83)	4:07.13	Q
4	2	6	Scotland	Lucy Hope (1:03.79); Corrie Scott (1:09.64); Fiona Donnelly (1:00.21); Rachel Masson (55.53)	4:09.17	Q
5	2	2	Wales	Rachel Williams (1:03.46); Chloe Tutton (1:09.94); Alys Thomas (59.52); Hannah McCarthy (56.84)	4:09.76	Q
6	1	3	South Africa	Jessica Ashley-Cooper (1:03.72); Tara-Lynn Nicholas (1:10.35); Marne Erasmus (1:01.25); Marlies Ross (56.02)	4:11.34	Q
7	1	6	Singapore	Tao Li (1:04.70); Samantha Yeo (1:12.80); Quah Ting Wen (1:01.99); Marina Chan (57.94)	4:17.43	Q
8	1	5	Northern Ireland	Danielle Hill (1:07.96); Sycerika McMahon (1:11.49); Gemma Kane (1:03.13); Rachel Bethel (59.76)	4:22.34	Q
9	2	3	Papua New Guinea	Savannah Tkatchenko (1:13.96); Barbara Vali-Skelton (1:18.71); Tegan McCarthy (1:10.14); Jocelyn Flynn (1:06.23)	4:49.04	

=== Final ===
Rank	Lane	Nation	Swimmers	Time	Notes
1st place, gold medalist(s)	4	Australia	Emily Seebohm (59.41); Lorna Tonks (1:08.28); Emma McKeon (56.95); Cate Campbell (51.59)	3:56.23	GR
2nd place, silver medalist(s)	5	England	Lauren Quigley (1:00.17); Sophie Taylor (1:06.39); Siobhan-Marie O'Connor (57.89); Francesca Halsall (52.58)	3:57.03	=NR
3rd place, bronze medalist(s)	3	Canada	Sinead Russell (59.94); Tera van Beilen (1:08.01); Katerine Savard (57.72); Sandrine Mainville (54.90)	4:00.57	
4	6	Scotland	Kathleen Dawson (1:01.25); Katie Armitage (1:08.57); Fiona Donnelly (1:00.16); Sian Harkin (55.61)	4:05.59	
5	7	South Africa	Karin Prinsloo (1:01.68); Tara-Lynn Nicholas (1:09.80); Marne Erasmus (1:00.93); Erin Gallagher (56.90)	4:09.31	
	2	Wales	Georgia Davies (59.69); Chloe Tutton; Jemma Lowe; Hannah McCarthy		DSQ
	8	Northern Ireland	Danielle Hill (1:07.47); Sycerika McMahon (1:10.97); Gemma Kane (1:02.12); Rachel Bethel		DSQ
	1	Singapore			DNS
