= Dudok =

Dudok is a surname. Notable people with the surname include:

- Willem Marinus Dudok (1884–1974), Dutch architect
- Evert Dudok (born 1959), Dutch business executive
- Giuliana Dudok (born 2000), Uruguayan swimmer
- Rodrigo Dudok (born 2007), Uruguayan footballer
