= 2014 Pan Pacific Swimming Championships – Women's 200 metre backstroke =

Women's 200 metre backstroke at the 2014 Pan Pacific Swimming Championships
- Venue: Gold Coast Aquatic Centre
- Dates: August 23, 2014 (heats & finals)
- Competitors: 21
- Winning time: 2:07.49

Medalists
gold medal	Belinda Hocking	Australia
silver medal	Emily Seebohm	Australia
bronze medal	Elizabeth Beisel	United States

The women's 200 metre backstroke competition at the 2014 Pan Pacific Swimming Championships took place on August 23 at the Gold Coast Aquatic Centre. The last champion was Elizabeth Beisel of United States.

This race consisted of four lengths of the pool, all in backstroke.

== Records ==
Prior to this competition, the existing world and Pan Pacific records were as follows:

World record	Missy Franklin (USA)	2:04.06	London, UK	August 3, 2012
Pan Pacific Championships record	Elizabeth Pelton (USA)	2:07.48	Irvine, United States	August 20, 2010

== Results ==
All times are in minutes and seconds.

KEY:	q	Fastest non-qualifiers	Q	Qualified	CR	Championships record	NR	National record	PB	Personal best	SB	Seasonal best

=== Heats ===
The first round was held on August 23, at 11:24.

Rank	Name	Nationality	Time	Notes
1	Belinda Hocking	Australia	2:08.99	QA
2	Missy Franklin	United States	2:09.00	QA
3	Elizabeth Beisel	United States	2:09.24	QA
4	Hilary Caldwell	Canada	2:09.72	QA
5	Dominic Bouchard	Canada	2:09.73	QA
6	Elizabeth Pelton	United States	2:09.95	QA
7	Brooklyn Snodgrass	Canada	2:10.22	QA
8	Emily Seebohm	Australia	2:10.99	QA
9	Genevieve Cantin	Canada	2:11.12	QB
10	Sayaka Akase	Japan	2:11.24	QB
11	Hali Flickinger	United States	2:12.14	QB
12	Kathleen Baker	United States	2:13.38	QB
13	Lisa Bratton	United States	2:13.55	QB
14	Marie Kamimura	Japan	2:13.96	QB
15	Shiho Sakai	Japan	2:14.16	QB
16	Sydney Pickrem	Canada	2:14.83	QB
17	Miyu Otsuka	Japan	2:16.00	
18	Zhao Ying	China	2:18.82	
19	Claudia Lau	Hong Kong	2:19.06	
20	Beatrix Malan	South Africa	2:20.25	
21	Marce Loubser	South Africa	2:20.43	

=== B Final ===
The B final was held on August 23, at 20:36.

Rank	Name	Nationality	Time	Notes
9	Elizabeth Pelton	United States	2:09.36	
10	Brooklynn Snodgrass	Canada	2:09.76	
11	Genevieve Cantin	Canada	2:10.76	
12	Shiho Sakai	Japan	2:12.36	
13	Zhao Ying	China	2:17.65	
14	Claudia Lau	Hong Kong	2:18.12	
15	Beatrix Malan	South Africa	2:19.42	
16	Marce Loubser	South Africa	2:19.63	

=== A Final ===
The A final was held on August 23, at 20:36.

Rank	Name	Nationality	Time	Notes
1st place, gold medalist(s)	Belinda Hocking	Australia	2:07.49	
2nd place, silver medalist(s)	Emily Seebohm	Australia	2:07.61	
3rd place, bronze medalist(s)	Elizabeth Beisel	United States	2:08.33	
4	Missy Franklin	United States	2:08.82	
5	Hilary Caldwell	Canada	2:09.02	
6	Dominic Bouchard	Canada	2:09.59	
7	Sayaka Akase	Japan	2:09.65	
8	Marie Kamimura	Japan	2:12.69	
