= Swimming at the 2014 Commonwealth Games – Women's 200 metre backstroke =

Women's 200 metre backstroke at the 2014 Commonwealth Games
- Venue: Tollcross International Swimming Centre
- Dates: 27 July 2014
- Competitors: 16 from 9 nations
- Winning time: 2:07.24 GR

Medalists
gold medal	Belinda Hocking	Australia
silver medal	Emily Seebohm	Australia
bronze medal	Hilary Caldwell	Canada

The women's 200 metre backstroke event at the 2014 Commonwealth Games as part of the swimming programme took place on 27 July at the Tollcross International Swimming Centre in Glasgow, Scotland.

The medals were presented by David Sparkes, chief executive officer of British Swimming and the quaichs were presented by Ian Mason, Director of World Class Operations, British Swimming.

== Records ==
Prior to this competition, the existing world and Commonwealth Games records were as follows.

World record	Missy Franklin (USA)	2:04.06	London, Great Britain	3 August 2012
Commonwealth record	Belinda Hocking (AUS)	2:06.06	Shanghai, China	30 July 2011
Games record	Meagen Nay (AUS)	2:07.56	Delhi, India	8 October 2010

The following records were established during the competition:

Date	Event	Name	Nationality	Time	Record
27 July	Final	Belinda Hocking	Australia	2:07.24	GR

== Results ==
=== Heats ===
Rank	Heat	Lane	Name	Nationality	Time	Notes
1	1	4	Hilary Caldwell	Canada	2:09.47	Q
2	1	5	Elizabeth Simmonds	England	2:10.81	Q
3	2	4	Belinda Hocking	Australia	2:11.07	Q
4	2	5	Emily Seebohm	Australia	2:11.47	Q
5	2	3	Madison Wilson	Australia	2:11.53	Q
6	2	6	Genevieve Cantin	Canada	2:11.59	Q
7	1	3	Sinead Russell	Canada	2:12.78	Q
8	1	6	Lauren Quigley	England	2:13.45	Q
9	2	2	Jessica Fullalove	England	2:15.95	
10	1	2	Rachel Williams	Wales	2:16.53	
11	2	7	Danielle Stirrat	Wales	2:21.20	
12	1	1	Kimiko Raheem	Sri Lanka	2:24.63	
13	2	1	Talisa Lanoe	Kenya	2:26.12	
14	1	7	Danielle Hill	Northern Ireland	2:26.52	
15	2	8	Lauren Hew	Cayman Islands	2:27.16	
16	1	8	Areeba Shaikh	Pakistan	2:46.30	

=== Final ===
Rank	Lane	Name	Nationality	Time	Notes
1st place, gold medalist(s)	3	Belinda Hocking	Australia	2:07.24	GR
2nd place, silver medalist(s)	6	Emily Seebohm	Australia	2:08.51	
3rd place, bronze medalist(s)	4	Hilary Caldwell	Canada	2:08.55	
4	5	Elizabeth Simmonds	England	2:09.29	
5	8	Lauren Quigley	England	2:09.51	
6	2	Madison Wilson	Australia	2:10.35	
7	7	Genevieve Cantin	Canada	2:10.91	
8	1	Sinead Russell	Canada	2:12.61	
