= Swimming at the 2013 World Aquatics Championships – Women's 200 metre backstroke =

Women's 200 metre backstroke at the 2013 World Aquatics Championships
- Venue: Palau Sant Jordi
- Date: August 2, 2013 (heats & semifinals); August 3, 2013 (final)
- Competitors: 34 from 29 nations
- Winning time: 2:04.76 CR

Medalists
gold medal	Missy Franklin	United States
silver medal	Belinda Hocking	Australia
bronze medal	Hilary Caldwell	Canada

Barcelona Palau San Jordi

The women's 200 metre backstroke event in swimming at the 2013 World Aquatics Championships took place on 2–3 August at the Palau Sant Jordi in Barcelona, Spain.

== Records ==
Prior to this competition, the existing world and championship records were:

World record	Missy Franklin (USA)	2:04.06	London, Great Britain	3 August 2012
Competition record	Kirsty Coventry (ZIM)	2:04.81	Rome, Italy	1 August 2009

The following new records were set during this competition.

Date	Event	Name	Nationality	Time	Record
3 August	Final	Missy Franklin	United States	2:04.76	CR

== Results ==
=== Heats ===
The heats were held at 10:54.

Rank	Heat	Lane	Name	Nationality	Time	Notes
1	4	4	Missy Franklin	United States	2:07.57	Q
2	2	4	Belinda Hocking	Australia	2:07.64	Q
3	2	3	Hilary Caldwell	Canada	2:07.81	Q, NR
4	2	5	Daria Ustinova	Russia	2:08.69	Q
5	2	6	Katinka Hosszú	Hungary	2:08.93	Q
6	4	3	Sinead Russell	Canada	2:09.24	Q
7	3	3	Daryna Zevina	Ukraine	2:09.31	Q
8	3	4	Elizabeth Pelton	United States	2:09.56	Q
9	4	5	Meagen Nay	Australia	2:10.62	Q
10	3	5	Federica Pellegrini	Italy	2:10.65	Q
11	2	2	Karin Prinsloo	South Africa	2:10.71	Q
12	4	1	Evelyn Verrasztó	Hungary	2:10.86	Q
13	4	6	Sayaka Akase	Japan	2:10.87	Q
14	3	7	Miyu Otsuka	Japan	2:11.69	Q
15	4	2	Simona Baumrtová	Czech Republic	2:11.86	Q
16	3	1	Bai Anqi	China	2:12.14	Q
17	4	7	Eygló Ósk Gústafsdóttir	Iceland	2:12.32	
18	3	8	Fernanda González	Mexico	2:12.53	
19	2	8	Nguyen Thi Anh Vien	Vietnam	2:12.75	
20	4	8	Sophia Batchelor	New Zealand	2:12.89	
21	3	6	Duane Da Rocha	Spain	2:14.01	
22	3	0	Carolina Colorado Henao	Colombia	2:14.02	
23	2	1	Im Da-Sol	South Korea	2:14.07	
24	2	7	Selina Hocke	Germany	2:14.10	
25	3	2	Lauren Quigley	Great Britain	2:14.27	
26	2	9	Ugne Mazutaityte	Lithuania	2:14.41	
27	1	3	Zanre Oberholzer	Namibia	2:14.52	
28	2	0	Klaudia Nazieblo	Poland	2:14.76	
29	4	9	Halime Zeren	Turkey	2:15.48	
30	1	4	Gisela Morales	Guatemala	2:15.63	
31	1	5	Tatiana Perstniova	Moldova	2:17.19	
32	1	2	Karen Vilorio	Honduras	2:18.04	
33	1	6	Inés Remersaro	Uruguay	2:24.15	
34	1	7	Kimiko Shihara Raheem	Sri Lanka	2:26.61	
	3	9	Ekaterina Avramova	Bulgaria		DNS
	4	0	Joanna Maranhão	Brazil		DNS

=== Semifinals ===
The semifinals were held at 18:18.

==== Semifinal 1 ====
Rank	Lane	Name	Nationality	Time	Notes
1	6	Elizabeth Pelton	United States	2:08.20	Q
2	4	Belinda Hocking	Australia	2:08.49	Q
3	5	Daria Ustinova	Russia	2:09.08	Q
4	3	Sinead Russell	Canada	2:09.84	Q
5	2	Federica Pellegrini	Italy	2:09.97	
6	8	Bai Anqi	China	2:11.18	
7	1	Miyu Otsuka	Japan	2:11.68	
8	7	Evelyn Verrasztó	Hungary	2:11.83	

==== Semifinal 2 ====
Rank	Lane	Name	Nationality	Time	Notes
1	4	Missy Franklin	United States	2:06.46	Q
2	5	Hilary Caldwell	Canada	2:07.15	Q, NR
3	6	Daryna Zevina	Ukraine	2:08.74	Q
4	3	Katinka Hosszú	Hungary	2:08.97	Q
5	7	Karin Prinsloo	South Africa	2:10.04	
6	8	Simona Baumrtová	Czech Republic	2:10.46	
7	1	Sayaka Akase	Japan	2:11.48	
8	2	Meagen Nay	Australia	2:11.72	

=== Final ===
The final was held at 18:17.

Rank	Lane	Name	Nationality	Time	Notes
1st place, gold medalist(s)	4	Missy Franklin	United States	2:04.76	CR
2nd place, silver medalist(s)	6	Belinda Hocking	Australia	2:06.66	
3rd place, bronze medalist(s)	5	Hilary Caldwell	Canada	2:06.80	NR
4	2	Daryna Zevina	Ukraine	2:08.72	
5	3	Elizabeth Pelton	United States	2:08.98	
6	7	Katinka Hosszú	Hungary	2:09.08	
7	8	Sinead Russell	Canada	2:10.46	
8	1	Daria Ustinova	Russia	2:11.30	
