= Emily Thomas (swimmer) =

New Zealand swimmer

Personal information
- Nationality: New Zealand
- Born: 10 December 1990 (age 35) Waipukurau, New Zealand
- Height: 1.76 m (5 ft 9 in)

Sport
- Sport: Swimming
- Strokes: Backstroke
- Club: Enterprise / Comet / North Shore
- Coach: Scott Talbot / Greg Meade
Medal record
Women's swimming
Representing New Zealand
World Youth Championships
Silver medal – second place	2006 Rio de Janeiro	50 m Backstroke
Pan Pacific Championships
Bronze medal – third place	2010 Irvine	50 m Backstroke

Emily Thomas (born 10 December 1990 in Waipukurau, New Zealand) is a former competitive swimmer for New Zealand. She won a bronze medal at the 2010 Pan Pacific Championships in the 50 metre backstroke, she also represented New Zealand at the 2010 Commonwealth Games.

== Swimming career ==
=== 2006 Youth Worlds ===
Thomas claimed the silver medal in the 50 metre backstroke at the 2006 FINA Youth World Swimming Championships held in Rio de Janeiro, Brazil. After clocking a 30.31 in the heats, Thomas progressed to the semi-final where she swam a 29.92. In the final, Thomas finished in a time of 29.58 behind Yanxin Zhou of China. Thomas narrowly missed out of the final in the 100 metre backstroke with a time of 1:04.65. The race was eventually won by compatriot Natalie Wiegersma. She also competed in the 200 metre backstroke finishing with a time of 2:19.39

=== 2010 Pan Pacific championships ===
Thomas made her senior international debut at the 2010 Pan Pacific Championships held in Irvine, United States. In the heats of the 50 metre backstroke, Thomas swum a 28.49 to make the A Final where she finished third in a three way tie along Fabiola Molina and Rachel Bootsma. Thomas was the first New Zealand swimmer to finish on the podium at this meet since 1997 when Trent Bray finished third in the 200 metre freestyle individually, and the men's 4x100 and 4x200 metre freestyle relays also claimed the bronze medal.

Thomas additionally made the B Final in the 100 metre backstroke following her heats swim of 1:01.55. In the final, she finished fifth in a time of 1:01.93, she also raced the 50 metre freestyle but did not progress with a time of 26.95.

=== 2010 Commonwealth Games ===
At the 2010 Commonwealth games held in Delhi, India, Thomas competed in both the 50 and 100 metre backstroke. In the 50 metre backstroke, Thomas qualified for the final following a heat swim of 29.17 and a semi-final swim of 28.85. She finished in seventh place in the final with a time of 29.02. In the 100 metre backstroke, she progressed to the semi-final following a heat swim of 1:01.77 and finished fifth in the semi-final in a time of 1:01.58.

Thomas is the New Zealand current record holder in the 100 metre long course backstroke with a time of 1:00.22 set in 2009.
