= Hilary Caldwell =

Canadian swimmer (born 1991)

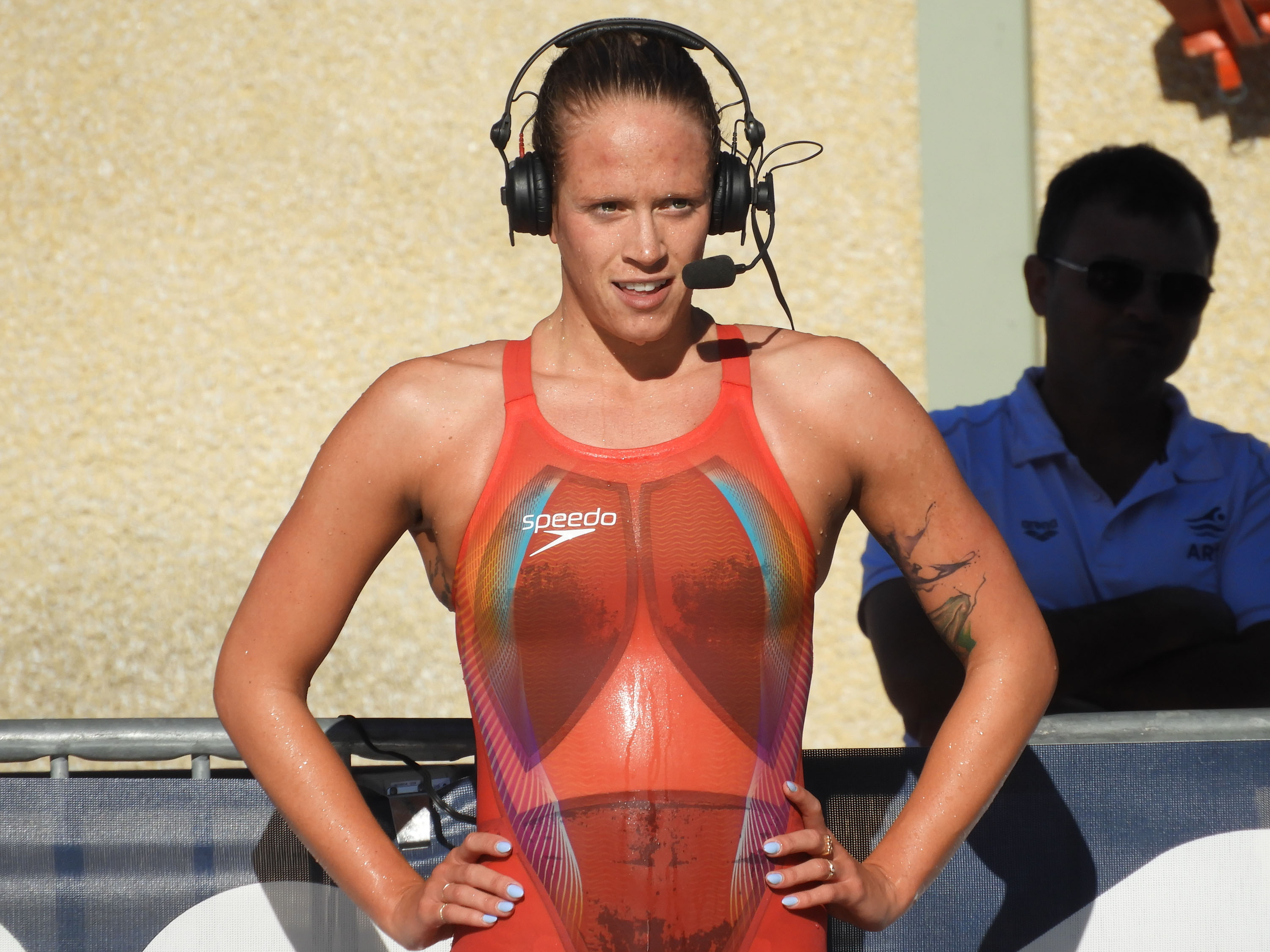

Personal information
- National team: Canada
- Born: March 13, 1991 (age 35) London, Ontario, Canada
- Height: 1.73 m (5 ft 8 in)
- Weight: 61 kg (134 lb)

Sport
- Sport: Swimming
- Strokes: Backstroke, Individual Medley
- Club: Pacific Sea Wolves (Surrey, B.C., Canada); Island Swimming (Victoria B.C.)
- College team: University of Victoria
- Coach: Brad Dingey (Pacific Sea Wolves); Randy Bennett (Island Swimming); Ryan Mallette (Victoria HPC)
Medal record
Women's swimming
Representing Canada
Olympic Games
Bronze medal – third place	2016 Rio de Janeiro	200 m backstroke
World Championships (LC)
Bronze medal – third place	2013 Barcelona	200 m backstroke
World Championships (SC)
Silver medal – second place	2016 Windsor	4×100 m medley
Commonwealth Games
Bronze medal – third place	2014 Glasgow	200 m backstroke
Pan American Games
Gold medal – first place	2015 Toronto	200 m backstroke

Hilary Anne Caldwell (born March 13, 1991) is a former Canadian competition swimmer who swam for the University of Victoria, and participated in the 2012 Summer Olympics in London, though she did not medal. She later won a bronze medal in the 200 m backstroke at the 2016 Summer Olympics in Rio de Janeiro. She performed most of her Olympic training at the High Performance Center in Victoria, British Columbia under Coach Randy Bennett, and after 2015 with Coach Ryan Mallette. A prolific competitor on the international stage, and a former Canadian record holder in the 200 meter backstroke, she won a bronze medal in the 200 meter backstroke at the 2013 World Aquatics Championships, and another bronze in the same event at the 2014 Commonwealth Games. She later won a gold in the 200 m backstroke at the 2015 Pan American Games in Toronto.

== Early swimming ==
Caldwell was born March 13, 1991 in London, Ontario, Canada, to Gillian and Chalmers Caldwell though after a family move to Canada's West Coast she grew up in White Rock, British Columbia, around 22 miles Northwest of Vancouver.

Hilary began swimming in her backyard pool, started competitive swimming at six, and was soon training and competing with nearby South Surrey's Pacific Sea Wolves Swim Team. Her sister Kathleen, three years younger than Hilary and known as Kate, also competed in swimming with the Sea Wolves and won several events in local and regional meets. While swimming with the Sea Wolves, Hilary swam primarily at the South Surrey Indoor pool, a modest six lane 25 meter facility where she was trained by Sea Wolves' Coaches Brad Dingey and Annie Wolf for over ten years. Caldwell competed in multiple strokes from an early age. Swimming for the Sea Wolves shortly after her twelfth birthday in April 2003, at the Lower Mainland Regional Meet in Haney B.C., she placed first in the 1500 and 200 meter freestyle, second in the 50 meter backstroke, and third in the 50 meter butterfly, 50 meter breastroke, and 100 meter freestyle.

=== Secondary School swimming ===
Caldwell attended and competed as a High School swimmer for the Earl Mariott Secondary School (EMS) Mariners in greater Surrey under Head Coach Carole Gair. Becoming a Provincial champion at age 14 in November, 2005, at the British Columbia High School State Championships, Caldwell swam anchor in the winning 4x100 meter freestyle relay, though she placed sixth in both the 100 backstroke and 200 Individual Medley events. In the 2006 B.C. State Championships, Caldwell's Earl Mariott High placed second, though the team may have placed first in the final tally. Repeating as a Provincial Champion in November 2007, Earl Mariott Secondary won the British Columbia Swim Championship in Victoria, with Caldwell taking a third in the 4x100 freestyle relay, and a first in the 100 backstroke.

Both Hilary and her sister Kate qualified to compete in the Canadian Olympic trials in April, 2008 in Montreal.

=== University of Victoria ===
In 2009, Caldwell enrolled at the University of Victoria, where she studied French and history. She swam for the Victoria Vikes, training primarily at the Olympic pool at Saanich Commonwealth Place, which had been used by the university since 1994. The university's head coach in 2009 was Dr. Peter Vizsolyi, who coached ten Canadian Olympic swimmers during his coaching tenure. During her time as a collegiate swimmer, Caldwell performed her most extensive training as part of the Island Swimming/Victoria Academy Swim Club, under head coach Randy Bennett, where she trained with Canadian Olympic medalist Ryan Cochrane. The Saanich Commonwealth Pool is in greater Victoria, about six miles from the University of Victoria campus, and has a 50-meter competition pool, a 25-meter lap pool, and a diving facility.

While attending the University of Victoria, in February 2011, she won both the 50- and 200-meter backstroke events and was part of a relay team that won the bronze medal at the Canadian Interuniversity Sport (CIS) Championships. Recognized as an outstanding coach, Caldwell's Pacific Sea Wolves' Coach Brad Dingey would coach at Canada's High Performance Clinic beginning in 2015, a training facility for Canada's National team, where he would again coach Caldwell.

=== 2012-2016 Olympics ===
At the 2012 Olympic trials in Montreal, Caldwell finished second in the 200-meter backstroke to Canadian rival Sinead Russell, granting Caldwell a berth on the Canadian Olympic team. Her Island Swimming Coach Randy Bennett would also serve as the Canadian Olympic Team Head Coach that year.

At the 2012 Summer Olympics in London, at 21, Hilary competed in the women's 200-metre backstroke, finishing in 18th place overall with a time of 2:10.75 in the heats, and failed to qualify for the semi-finals.

For the 2016 Summer Olympics in Rio, Caldwell was named to Canada's Olympic team. In the 200 metre backstroke event, she won the bronze medal with a time of 2:07.54, with silver medalist Katinka Hosszu of Hungary swimming a 2:06.05, and gold medalist Maya DiRado of the U.S. swimming a 2:05.99. In an outstanding year for the Canadian Olympic team, Caldwell took their sixth swimming medal. Positioned in Lane 5, Caldwell was in fourth place after 50 meters, but a great turn advanced her position. By the 150-meter mark, she was clearly in a close race with the leaders Though DiRado and Hosszu were considered favorites, Caldwell showed consisting having formerly finished third in both the 2015 World Championships and the 2014 Commonwealth Games. At the Rio Olympics, Caldwell swam under Canadian Olympic Head Coach Ben Titley. After the event she told CBC reporters that the previous year had been difficult and in winning the bronze, she was pleased to have made her new coach Ryan Mallette proud.

=== International competition ===
Having enrolled at the University of Victoria in 2009, and swimming for both the University and Victoria's Island Swimming Club with Randy Bennett as her Coach, Caldwell believed she greatly benefitted from Randy Bennett's knowledge of backstroke technique. She did most of her swimming during her college years at the Victoria High Performance Clinic at the Saanich Commonwealth place pool. Caldwell credited Bennett with greater success in backstroke events as she had previously competed somewhat more frequently in the individual medley. When Bennett died in April 2015, after Bennett had completed college, Ryan Mallette took over as the HPC-Victoria Head Coach.

At the 2013 World Aquatics Championships Caldwell swam to a surprise bronze medal in the 200-metre backstroke. She set and broke the national record for the 200-metre backstroke in each of the qualifying, semi-final, and final rounds in the process. Her time in the final was 2:06.90, a new Canadian record, though it placed her third behind gold medalist American Missy Franklin and Australian Belinda Hocking who placed second in a close finish with a time of 2:06.80. This broke Canadian teammate Sinead Russell's former Canadian record. Russell finished seventh in the same event.

Continuing to perform well under the tutelage of Bennett, Caldwell swam to a bronze medal at the 2014 Commonwealth Games in her feature event, the 200 m backstroke. She also swam in the 50 and 100 m backstroke. On July 15, 2015, Caldwell took the gold medal in the 200-meter backstroke at the 2015 Pan American Games in Toronto. The win was an emotional one has it came just months after the death of her esteemed coach, Bennett, who helped propel her to such heights.

She won a silver medal in the 4x100 Meter Medley Relay in Windsor, Ontario, at the Short Course World Championships in 2016.

In September 2017, Caldwell was named to Canada's 2018 Commonwealth Games team. She trained with Coach Michael Bohl to prepare for the 2018 Commonwealth Games at Australia's Griffith University.

In May 2018, Caldwell retired from competitive swimming with the Gold Coast Commonwealth Games as her last meet. She placed fifth in the finals of the 200 backstroke with a time of 2:09.22.

=== Honors ===
In 2013, Caldwell won Swimming Canada's Female Swimmer of the Year. She was inducted into the Victoria Sports Hall of Fame in 2024.

Caldwell had a supporting role as an actor in the film Nadia, Butterfly, about an Olympic swimmer trying to come to grips after retiring from the sport after participating in the 2020 Olympics. The film, released in September 2020, and directed by Canadian director Pascal Plant was the only Canadian-based work selected for the Cannes Film Festival, though it was not shown due to the COVID epidemic and premiered later.

== See also ==
- List of World Aquatics Championships medalists in swimming (women)
