= Giuliana Dudok =

Uruguayan swimmer (born 2000)

Personal information
- Nationality: Uruguayan
- Born: 20 August 2000 (age 25)

Sport
- Sport: Swimming

Giuliana Dudok (born 20 August 2000) is a Uruguayan swimmer. She competed in the women's 50 metre backstroke event at the 2018 FINA World Swimming Championships (25 m), in Hangzhou, China.
