= Emily Seebohm =

Australian swimmer (born 1992)

Emily Seebohm OAM
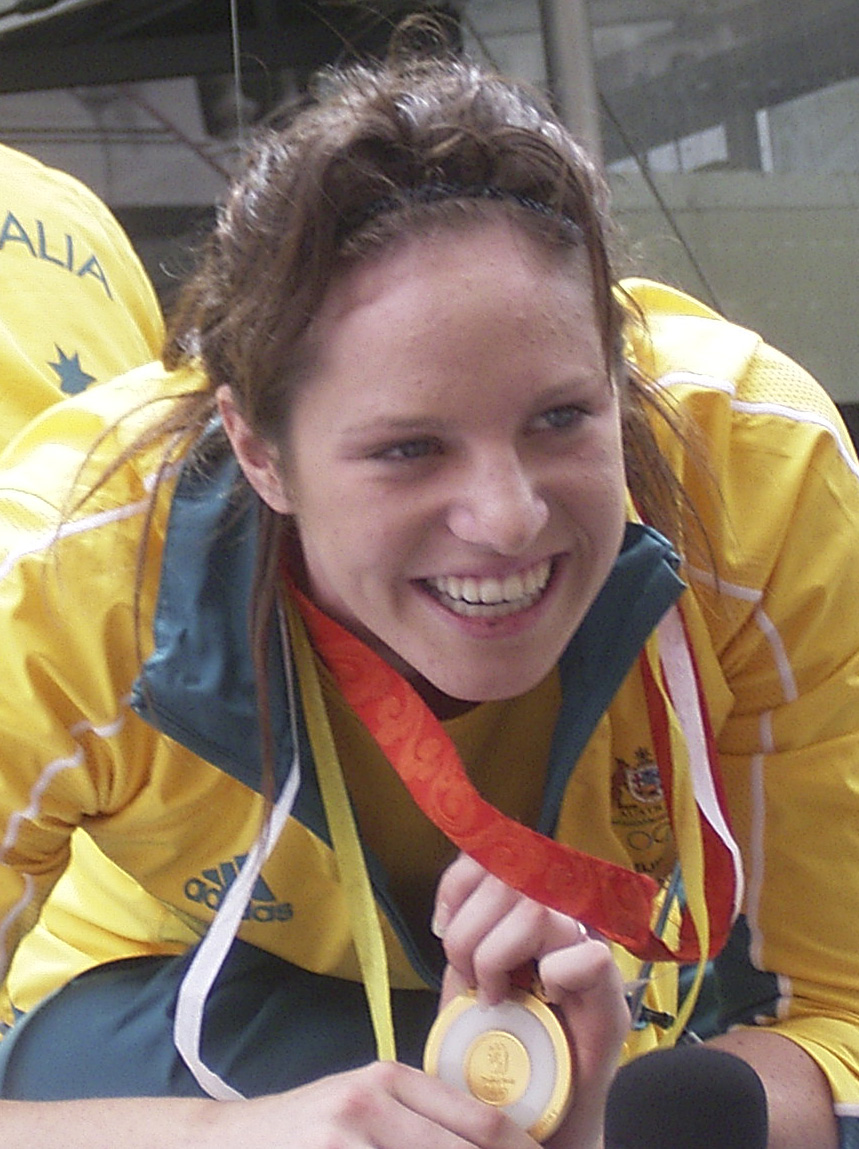
- Seebohm at the 2008 Summer Olympics

Personal information
- Full name: Emily Jane Seebohm
- National team: Australia
- Born: 5 June 1992 (age 34) Adelaide, South Australia
- Height: 1.83 m (6 ft 0 in)
- Weight: 64 kg (141 lb)

Sport
- Sport: Swimming
- Strokes: Backstroke, freestyle, butterfly, medley
- Club: Energy Standard; Griffith University
- Coach: Michael Bohl
Medal record
Women's swimming
Representing Australia
Event	1st	2nd	3rd
Olympic Games	3	3	1
World Championships (LC)	5	5	4
World Championships (SC)	0	5	5
Pan Pacific Championships	6	6	0
Commonwealth Games	7	4	4
Total	21	23	14
Olympic Games
Gold medal – first place	2008 Beijing	4×100 m medley
Gold medal – first place	2012 London	4×100 m freestyle
Gold medal – first place	2020 Tokyo	4×100 m medley
Silver medal – second place	2012 London	100 m backstroke
Silver medal – second place	2012 London	4×100 m medley
Silver medal – second place	2016 Rio de Janeiro	4×100 m medley
Bronze medal – third place	2020 Tokyo	200 m backstroke
World Championships (LC)
Gold medal – first place	2007 Melbourne	4×100 m medley
Gold medal – first place	2015 Kazan	100 m backstroke
Gold medal – first place	2015 Kazan	200 m backstroke
Gold medal – first place	2015 Kazan	4×100 m freestyle
Gold medal – first place	2017 Budapest	200 m backstroke
Silver medal – second place	2009 Rome	4×100 m medley
Silver medal – second place	2013 Barcelona	100 m backstroke
Silver medal – second place	2013 Barcelona	4×100 m freestyle
Silver medal – second place	2013 Barcelona	4×100 m medley
Silver medal – second place	2017 Budapest	4×100 m freestyle
Bronze medal – third place	2009 Rome	100 m backstroke
Bronze medal – third place	2015 Kazan	4×100 m medley
Bronze medal – third place	2017 Budapest	100 m backstroke
Bronze medal – third place	2017 Budapest	4×100 m medley
World Championships (SC)
Silver medal – second place	2014 Doha	50 m backstroke
Silver medal – second place	2014 Doha	100 m backstroke
Silver medal – second place	2014 Doha	200 m backstroke
Silver medal – second place	2014 Doha	4×100 m medley
Silver medal – second place	2016 Windsor	100 m medley
Bronze medal – third place	2014 Doha	100 m medley
Bronze medal – third place	2016 Windsor	200 m backstroke
Bronze medal – third place	2016 Windsor	4×100 m medley
Bronze medal – third place	2018 Hangzhou	200 m backstroke
Bronze medal – third place	2018 Hangzhou	4×50 m freestyle
Pan Pacific Championships
Gold medal – first place	2010 Irvine	100 m backstroke
Gold medal – first place	2010 Irvine	200 m medley
Gold medal – first place	2014 Gold Coast	100 m backstroke
Gold medal – first place	2014 Gold Coast	4×100 m medley
Gold medal – first place	2018 Tokyo	4×100 m freestyle
Gold medal – first place	2018 Tokyo	4×100 m medley
Silver medal – second place	2010 Irvine	100 m freestyle
Silver medal – second place	2010 Irvine	50 m butterfly
Silver medal – second place	2010 Irvine	4×100 m freestyle
Silver medal – second place	2010 Irvine	4×100 m medley
Silver medal – second place	2014 Gold Coast	200 m backstroke
Silver medal – second place	2018 Tokyo	100 m backstroke
Commonwealth Games
Gold medal – first place	2010 Delhi	100 m backstroke
Gold medal – first place	2010 Delhi	4×100 m freestyle
Gold medal – first place	2010 Delhi	4×100 m medley
Gold medal – first place	2014 Glasgow	100 m backstroke
Gold medal – first place	2014 Glasgow	4×100 m medley
Gold medal – first place	2018 Gold Coast	50 m backstroke
Gold medal – first place	2018 Gold Coast	4×100 m medley
Silver medal – second place	2010 Delhi	100 m freestyle
Silver medal – second place	2010 Delhi	200 m medley
Silver medal – second place	2014 Glasgow	200 m backstroke
Silver medal – second place	2018 Gold Coast	100 m backstroke
Bronze medal – third place	2010 Delhi	50 m backstroke
Bronze medal – third place	2010 Delhi	200 m backstroke
Bronze medal – third place	2010 Delhi	50 m butterfly
Bronze medal – third place	2018 Gold Coast	200 m backstroke

Emily Jane Seebohm, OAM (born 5 June 1992) is an Australian retired swimmer and television personality. She has appeared at four Olympic Games between 2008 and 2021; and won three Olympic gold medals, five world championship gold medals and seven Commonwealth Games gold medals.

In 2009, Seebohm was awarded the Medal of the Order of Australia.

Seebohm appeared as a contestant in the 8th season of the Australian version of I'm a Celebrity...Get Me Out of Here! in January 2022. Later the same year, she competed on The Challenge: Australia, and in 2023 she competed on The Challenge: World Championship. In 2026 she took part in the celebrity version of the Channel 4 show SAS: Who Dares Wins, finishing as joint winner alongside Gabby Allen and Dani Dyer.

== Early life and education ==
Seebohm was born on 5 June 1992 in Adelaide, South Australia. At age two, Seebohm and her family moved to Brisbane, Queensland so her mother Karen could coach swimming. Her father John Seebohm was also an accomplished footballer in the SANFL, who played over 300 games for the Glenelg Tigers. Growing up, Seebohm attended St Joseph's Catholic Primary School, St Margaret's Anglican Girls School and St John Fisher College, a Catholic school for girls.

== Career ==
At the age of 14, Seebohm won the 100 m backstroke at the 2007 Australian Championships, the selection meet for the 2007 World Aquatics Championships. At the World Championships in Melbourne, Seebohm won a gold medal in the 4 × 100 m medley relay. She also placed fourth in the final of the 100 m backstroke and 14th in the 50 m backstroke.

Seebohm also won gold in both the 100 m backstroke and 4 × 100 m medley relay at the 2007 Junior Pan Pacific Swimming Championships.

On 6 March 2008 at the Brisbane Catholic Schoolgirls Championships, Seebohm broke the 50 m backstroke Commonwealth and Australian records with a time of 28.10 seconds, missing Li Yang's then world record of 28.09 by one hundredth of a second.

On 22 March 2008, Seebohm broke the world record in the 50 m backstroke in the semi-finals of the 2008 Australian Championships, with a time of 27.95s, taking five hundredths of a second off Hayley McGregory's world record of 28.00 set only 15 days earlier on 7 March 2008. A day later, this record was beaten again, this time by Australian Sophie Edington in a time of 27.67 seconds in the final of the same event. Seebohm decided not to swim in the final of this event as it is not an Olympic event and instead decided to focus on the semi-final of the 100 m backstroke. Her decision paid off when she became the first Australian woman to break the one-minute barrier in the event, her 59.78 making her the fifth-fastest of all time. She then lowered the record to 59.58 s in the final, winning the Australian championship and gaining selection for the Olympic Games in Beijing.

At the 2008 Summer Olympics, Seebohm placed ninth overall in the 100 m backstroke, barely missing a spot in the final. Seebohm then swam in both the preliminaries and final of the 4 × 100 m medley relay, in which Australia won the gold medal.

At the 2009 World Aquatics Championships in Rome, Seebohm won the bronze medal in the 100 m backstroke with a time of 58.88. She also won silver in the 4 × 100 m medley relay, and placed 7th in the 50 m backstroke and 15th in the 200 m IM.

At the 2009 Australian Short Course Championships, Seebohm broke the world record in the 100 m IM in 58.54.

At the 2010 Pan Pacific Swimming Championships, on the first night she defeated Olympic champion Natalie Coughlin in the 100 m backstroke, taking gold in championship record time, as well as taking silver in the 50 m butterfly. On the second night, she took silver in the 100 m freestyle in her first attempt at the event at international level. On night 3 she took another silver in the 4 × 100 m freestyle relay. Final night saw her take the gold in the 200 m individual medley, topping world champion and record holder Ariana Kukors. Later on in the night she broke the 100 m backstroke championship record in the lead off leg of the 4 × 100 m medley relay, Australia finished with silver. Later on in the year she collected 8 medals at the 2010 Commonwealth Games

Seebohm was tracked by the BBC as part of their series World Olympic Dreams, which followed her as she prepared for London 2012.

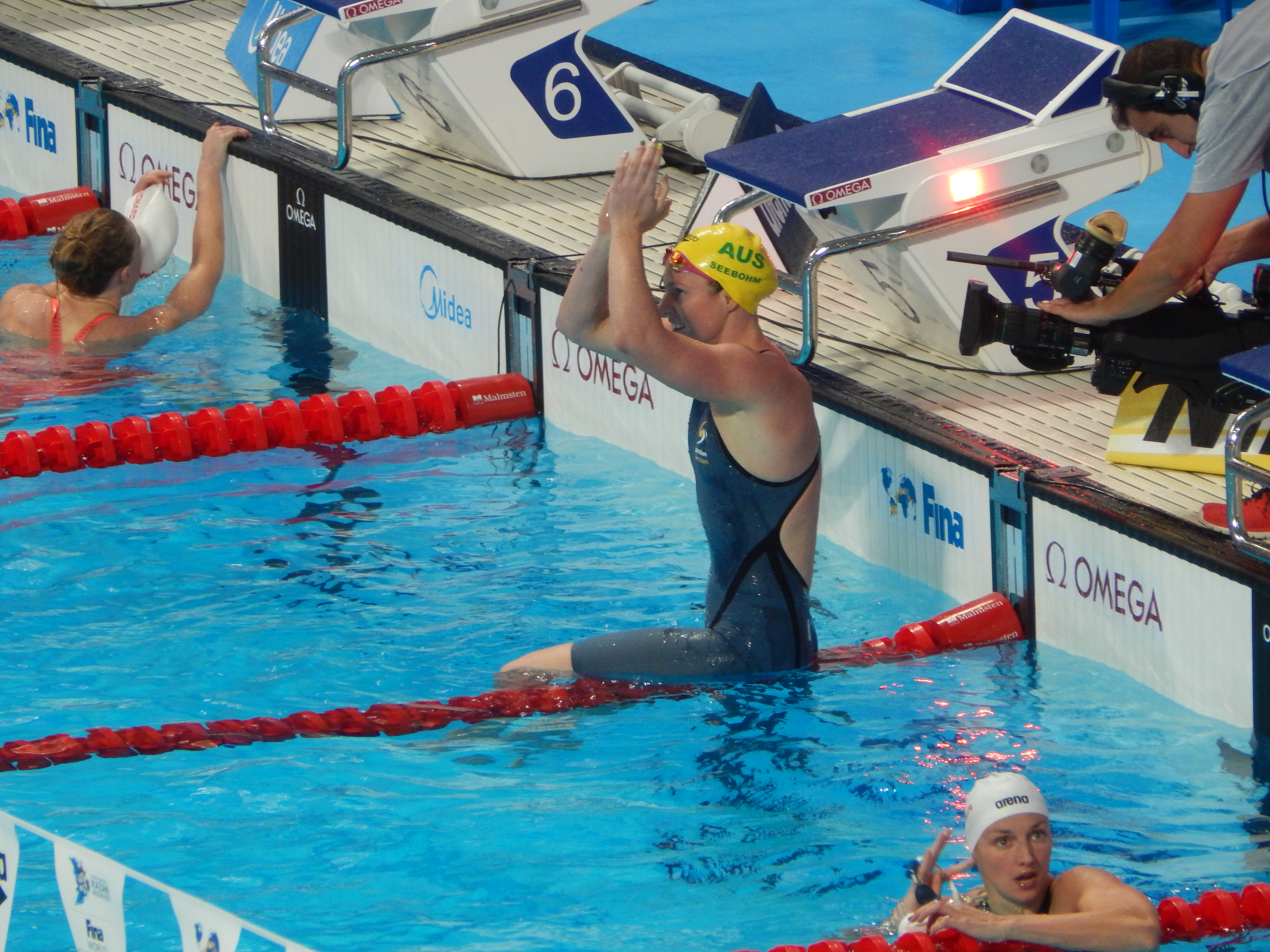
Seebohm wins 200m final in Kazan

At the 2012 London Olympics, Seebohm set a new Olympic record in a 100m backstroke qualifier and was heavily backed to win the gold in the final of the event but fell just short and gained a silver medal.

At the 2013 Australian Swimming Championships she won gold in the 50 m and 100 m backstroke and silver in 200 m individual medley and bronze in the 200 m backstroke events, qualifying for the 2013 World Aquatics Championships. At the World Championships, she teamed up with Bronte Campbell, Emma McKeon and Brittany Elmslie in the heats of the 4 × 100 m freestyle, finishing second in their heat and overall. In the final sisters Cate and Bronte Campbell, Emma McKeon and Alicia Coutts won the silver medal, finishing 0.12 seconds behind the United States.

At the 2016 Summer Olympics, Seebohm represented Australia in both the 100 m and 200 m backstroke and won silver in the 4 × 100 m medley relay.

In June 2021, Seebohm qualified for the 2020 Summer Olympics after finishing second in the 100m backstroke event at the Australian Olympic trials in a time of 58.59. The Tokyo Olympics were Seebohm's fourth consecutive Olympic Games, making her only one of three Australian swimmers to compete at four Olympic Games. At those Olympics she won a gold medal in the 4 x 100 metre medley relay, and a bronze medal in 200 metre backstroke.

=== International Swimming League ===
In the Autumn of 2019 she was member of the inaugural International Swimming League swimming for the Energy Standard International Swim Club, who won the team title in Las Vegas, Nevada, in December.

== Results in major championships ==
Meet	100 free	50 back	100 back	200 back	50 fly	200 medley	4×100 free	4×100 medley
WC 2007		14th	4th					1st place, gold medalist(s)
OG 2008			9th					1st place, gold medalist(s)
WC 2009		7th	3rd place, bronze medalist(s)			15th		2nd place, silver medalist(s)
PP 2010	2nd place, silver medalist(s)	9th	1st place, gold medalist(s)	WD^{[a]}	2nd place, silver medalist(s)	1st place, gold medalist(s)	2nd place, silver medalist(s)	2nd place, silver medalist(s)
CG 2010	2nd place, silver medalist(s)	3rd place, bronze medalist(s)	1st place, gold medalist(s)	3rd place, bronze medalist(s)	3rd place, bronze medalist(s)	2nd place, silver medalist(s)	1st place, gold medalist(s)	1st place, gold medalist(s)
WC 2011		5th	4th					
OG 2012			2nd place, silver medalist(s)				1st place, gold medalist(s)	2nd place, silver medalist(s)
WC 2013		12th	2nd place, silver medalist(s)			WD^{[b]}	2nd place, silver medalist(s)	2nd place, silver medalist(s)
CG 2014		4th	1st place, gold medalist(s)	2nd place, silver medalist(s)		7th		1st place, gold medalist(s)
PP 2014			1st place, gold medalist(s)	2nd place, silver medalist(s)		7th		1st place, gold medalist(s)
WC 2015		4th	1st place, gold medalist(s)	1st place, gold medalist(s)		4th	1st place, gold medalist(s)	3rd place, bronze medalist(s)
OG 2016			7th	12th				2nd place, silver medalist(s)
WC 2017		4th	3rd place, bronze medalist(s)	1st place, gold medalist(s)		4th	2nd place, silver medalist(s)	3rd place, bronze medalist(s)
CG 2018		1st place, gold medalist(s)	2nd place, silver medalist(s)	3rd place, bronze medalist(s)				1st place, gold medalist(s)
PP 2018			2nd place, silver medalist(s)	6th			1st place, gold medalist(s)	1st place, gold medalist(s)
OG 2021			5th	3rd place, bronze medalist(s)				1st place, gold medalist(s)

^{a} Seebohm withdrew after the heat
^{b} Seebohm withdrew after the semi-final

== Career best times ==
=== Long course metres (50 m pool) ===
As of 29 July 2017

Event	Time	Meet	Location	Date	Notes
50 m freestyle	25.05	2015 BHP Billiton Aquatic Super Series	Perth, Australia	30 January 2015	
100 m freestyle	53.92	2015 World Aquatics Championships	Kazan, Russia	2 August 2015	
200 m freestyle	1:59.95	2010 Australian Age Championships	Sydney, Australia	5 April 2010	
50 m backstroke	27.37	2017 World Aquatics Championships	Budapest, Hungary	27 July 2017	
100 m backstroke	58.23	2012 Summer Olympics	London, England	28 July 2012	
200 m backstroke	2:05.68	2017 World Aquatics Championships	Budapest, Hungary	29 July 2017	
50 m butterfly	26.05	2015 NSW State Open Championships	Sydney, Australia	27 February 2015	
100 m butterfly	58.52	2010 Australian Age Group Championships	Sydney, Australia	5 April 2010	
200 m individual medley	2:09.93	2010 Pan Pacific Swimming Championships	Irvine, California	21 August 2010	

=== Short course metres (25 m pool) ===
As of 6 October 2018

Event	Time	Meet	Location	Date	Notes
50 m freestyle	24.27	2016 Australian Championships (25m)	Brisbane, Australia	4 November 2016	
100 m freestyle	52.67	2015 Australian Championships (25m)	Sydney, Australia	26 November 2015	
50 m backstroke	25.83	2014 FINA World Swimming Championships (25 m)	Doha, Qatar	7 December 2014	
100 m backstroke	55.31	2014 FINA World Swimming Championships (25 m)	Doha, Qatar	4 December 2014	
200 m backstroke	1:59.49	2015 Australian Championships (25m)	Sydney, Australia	26 November 2015	
50 m breaststroke	29.96	2018 FINA Swimming World Cup	Budapest, Hungary	6 October 2018	
50 m butterfly	25.65	2017 FINA Swimming World Cup	Berlin, Germany	6 August 2017	
100 m butterfly	1:02.95	2017 FINA Swimming World Cup	Doha, Qatar	5 October 2017	
100 m individual medley	57.97	2016 FINA World Swimming Championships (25 m)	Windsor, Canada	9 December 2016	
200 m individual medley	2:05.46	2017 FINA Swimming World Cup	Singapore	18 November 2017	

== World records ==
=== Long course metres ===
No.	Event	Time		Meet	Location	Date	Status	Ref
1	4x100 m medley relay^{[a]}	3:55.74		2007 World Aquatics Championships	Melbourne, Australia	31 March 2007	Former	
2	50 m backstroke	27.95	sf	Australian Swimming Championships	Sydney, Australia	22 March 2008	Former	
3	4x100 m medley relay (2)^{[b]}	3:52.69		2008 Summer Olympics	Beijing, China	17 August 2008	Former	

^{a} split 1:00.79 (1st leg); with Leisel Jones (2nd leg), Jessica Schipper (3rd leg), Libby Lenton (4th leg)
^{b} split 59.33 (1st leg); with Leisel Jones (2nd leg), Jessica Schipper (3rd leg), Libby Trickett (4th leg)

=== Short course metres ===
No.	Event	Time	Meet	Location	Date	Status	Ref
1	100 m individual medley	58.54	Australian Short Course Championships	Hobart, Australia	10 August 2009	Former	

Legend: OC – Oceanian record; NR – Australian record; e – equalled existing record;
Records not set in finals: h – heat; sf – semifinal; r – relay 1st leg; rh – relay heat 1st leg; b – B final; † – en route to final mark; so – swim-off; tt – time trial

== Olympic records ==
=== Long course metres ===
No.	Event	Time		Meet	Location	Date	Status	Notes	Ref
1	4x100 m medley relay^{[a]}	3:52.69		2008 Summer Olympics	Beijing, China	17 August 2008	Former	Former WR, OC, NR	
2	100 m backstroke	58.23	h	2012 Summer Olympics	London, United Kingdom	29 July 2012	Former	Former OC, NR	

Legend: WR – World record; OC – Oceanian record; NR – Australian record; e – equalled existing record;
Records not set in finals: h – heat; sf – semifinal; r – relay 1st leg; rh – relay heat 1st leg; b – B final; † – en route to final mark; so – swim-off; tt – time trial

^{a} split 59.33 (backstroke leg); with Leisel Jones (breaststroke leg ), Jessicah Schipper (butterfly leg), Libby Trickett (freestyle leg)

== Personal life ==
In 2015, Seebohm began a relationship with fellow swimmer, Mitch Larkin. Seebohm announced their separation in July 2018. In 2019, Seebohm moved on with breakfast radio host David Lutteral, however after more than a year of dating, the pair split in March 2021. Seebohm confirmed in December 2022 that she was dating Ryan Gallagher, who she met while filming The Challenge Australia. In March 2023, the couple announced their engagement, and in September of the same year, their first child, a son, was born.

Seebohm, who has endometriosis, is an ambassador for the non-profit organisation Endometriosis Australia.

The Emily Seebohm Aquatic Centre, situated in the Brisbane suburb of Bracken Ridge, was named after the swimmer and officially opened in February 2016.

== Filmography ==
=== Television ===
Year	Title	Role	Notes	Ref.
2022	I'm a Celebrity...Get Me Out of Here!	Contestant	4th place	
2022	The Challenge: Australia	Contestant	6th place	
2023	The Challenge: World Championship	Contestant (with Yes Duffy)	5th place	
2025	Claire Hooper's House of Games	Self	5 episodes	
2026	SAS: Who Dares Wins	Contestant	Joint winner	

== See also ==
- List of Olympic medalists in swimming (women)
- List of World Aquatics Championships medalists in swimming (women)
- List of Commonwealth Games medallists in swimming (women)
- World record progression 50 metres backstroke
- World record progression 100 metres individual medley
- World record progression 4 × 100 metres medley relay

Records
Preceded by Hayley McGregory	Women's 50 metre backstroke world record holder (long course); 22 March 2008 – 23 March 2008	Succeeded by Sophie Edington
Preceded by Natalie Coughlin	Women's 100 metres individual medley world record holder (short course); 10 August 2009 – 17 October 2009	Succeeded by Therese Alshammar
Awards
Preceded by Cate Campbell	Pacific Rim Swimmer of the Year; 2015	Succeeded by Rie Kaneto
