= Kathleen Baker =

American swimmer (born 1997)

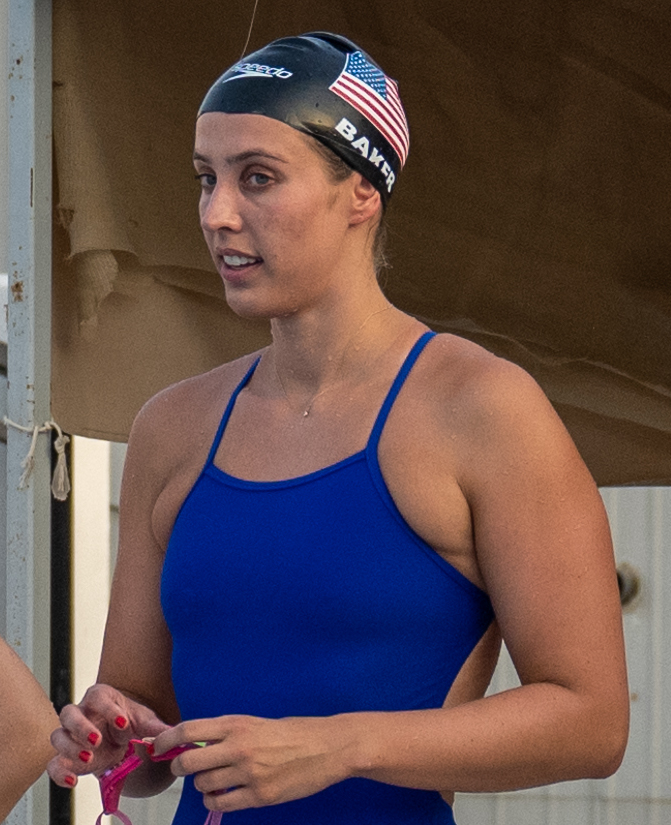
- Baker in 2024

Personal information
- Nicknames: Thleen, ThleenBean, Little Bean
- National team: United States
- Born: February 28, 1997 (age 29) Winston-Salem, North Carolina, U.S.
- Height: 5 ft 8 in (173 cm)
- Weight: 149 lb (68 kg)

Sport
- Sport: Swimming
- Strokes: Backstroke, Freestyle
- Club: SwimMAC Carolina
- College team: University of California, Berkeley
Medal record
Women's swimming
Representing the United States
Olympic Games
Gold medal – first place	2016 Rio de Janeiro	4×100 m medley
Silver medal – second place	2016 Rio de Janeiro	100 m backstroke
World Championships (LC)
Gold medal – first place	2017 Budapest	4×100 m medley
Silver medal – second place	2017 Budapest	100 m backstroke
Bronze medal – third place	2017 Budapest	200 m backstroke
World Championships (SC)
Gold medal – first place	2018 Hangzhou	4×50 m medley
Gold medal – first place	2018 Hangzhou	4×100 m medley
Silver medal – second place	2018 Hangzhou	200 m backstroke
Bronze medal – third place	2018 Hangzhou	200 m medley
Pan Pacific Championships
Gold medal – first place	2018 Tokyo	200 m backstroke
Silver medal – second place	2018 Tokyo	4×100 m medley
Bronze medal – third place	2018 Tokyo	100 m backstroke
Bronze medal – third place	2018 Tokyo	4×100 m mixed medley

Kathleen Baker (born February 28, 1997) is an American competition swimmer who specializes in freestyle and backstroke events. At the 2016 Summer Olympics, she won a gold medal in the 4x100-meter medley relay and a silver medal in the individual 100-meter backstroke. She is the former world-record holder in 100 meter backstroke, set on July 28, 2018, in 58.00 at the William Woollett Jr. Aquatics Center in Irvine, CA. Baker is also the former world-record holder in the 4x100 meter medley relay with Lilly King, Dana Vollmer, and Simone Manuel.

== Early life ==
Baker attended Forsyth Country Day School until the tenth grade and then was home-schooled, so it would be easy to travel back and forth between Winston-Salem, North Carolina and Charlotte, North Carolina to swim and train with SwimMAC Carolina. Her mother swam for the College of Charleston in Charleston, South Carolina, and her older sister, Rachel, swam for Washington and Lee University.

In 2010, Baker was diagnosed with Crohn's disease.

== Career ==
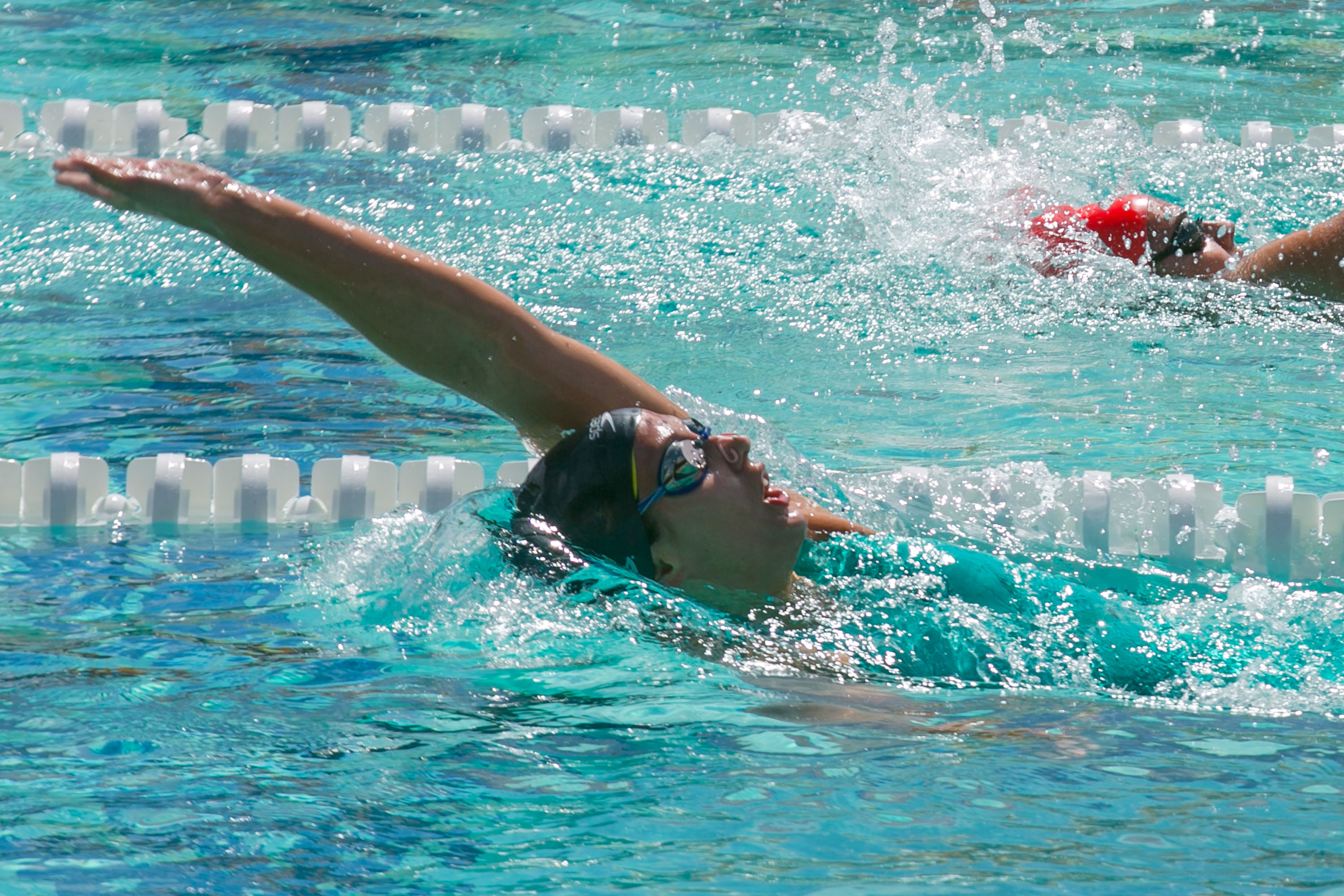
Baker competing in 2017

=== College swimming ===
Baker attended the University of California, Berkeley, where she competed for the California Golden Bears swimming and diving team for three years from 2015 to 2018.

=== 2014–2015 ===
At the 2014 Phillips 66 Nationals, the qualification meet for the 2014 Pan Pacifics, Baker finished second in the 200-meter backstroke and qualified for the team. She finished ninth in the 200-meter backstroke at Pan Pacifics, just outside the final.

Baker was also selected to the 2015 World Championships roster in the 100-meter backstroke. She placed eighth in the final of the 100-meter backstroke. She also swam in the prelims for the 4x100-meter medley relay, but did not receive a medal as the final squad finished fourth.

=== 2016 Summer Olympics ===
At the 2016 Olympic Trials, Baker qualified for her first Olympics in the 100-meter backstroke by finishing second with a time of 59.29.

In Rio, she won a silver medal in the 100-meter backstroke with a time of 58.75, three tenths behind the winner Katinka Hosszú. She was not considered by many to be a medal threat since she had never broken 59 seconds prior to the Olympics. Baker also won a gold medal alongside Lilly King, Dana Vollmer, and Simone Manuel as the lead off of the 4x100-meter medley relay.

=== 2017 ===
2017 World Championships
Gold medal – first place	4×100 m medley	3:51.55 (WR)
Silver medal – second place	100 m backstroke	58.58
Bronze medal – third place	200 m backstroke	2:06.48

At the 2017 World Championships, Baker won three medals. She won silver in the 100-meter backstroke, bronze in the 200-meter backstroke, and gold in the 4x100-meter medley relay. Though she did not medal in the 50-meter backstroke, Baker broke Natalie Coughlin's American record in the event in the semifinals with a time of 27.48. Baker led off the women's 4x100-meter medley relay, with the team winning with a time of 3:51.55. The team of Baker, Lilly King, Kelsi Worrell, and Simone Manuel broke the 2012 world record of 3:52.05 set by Missy Franklin, Rebecca Soni, Dana Vollmer, and Allison Schmitt.

== Coaching career ==
Baker signed with Athletes Untapped as a private swimming coach on Aug 10, 2025.

== Personal life ==
In July 2021, Baker announced her engagement to her long-time boyfriend and United States Marine, Sean Dowling.

== See also ==
- List of people diagnosed with Crohn's disease

Records
Preceded by Kylie Masse	Women's 100 metre backstroke world record holder (long course); 28 July 2018 – 28 July 2019	Succeeded by Regan Smith
