= Miyuki Takemura =

Japanese swimmer (born 1989)

Personal information
- Nationality: Japanese
- Born: 25 July 1989 (age 36)

Sport
- Sport: Swimming
Medal record
Representing Japan
Asian Games
Bronze medal – third place	2014 Incheon	50m backstroke

Miyuki Takemura (born 25 July 1989) is a Japanese swimmer. She competed in the women's 50 metre backstroke event at the 2018 FINA World Swimming Championships (25 m), in Hangzhou, China.
