= Rachel Bootsma =

American swimmer (born 1993)

Personal information
- Full name: Rachel Kristine Bootsma
- National team: United States
- Born: December 15, 1993 (age 32) Minneapolis, Minnesota, U.S.
- Height: 5 ft 8 in (173 cm)
- Weight: 146 lb (66 kg)
- Spouse: Cole Reiser

Sport
- Sport: Swimming
- Strokes: Backstroke
- College team: University of California, Berkeley
Medal record
Women's swimming
Representing the United States
Olympic Games
Gold medal – first place	2012 London	4×100 m medley
Pan American Games
Gold medal – first place	2011 Guadalajara	100 m backstroke
Gold medal – first place	2011 Guadalajara	4×100 m medley
Pan Pacific Championships
Bronze medal – third place	2010 Irvine	50 m backstroke
Summer Universiade
Bronze medal – third place	2015 Gwangju	100 m backstroke

Rachel Kristine Bootsma (born December 15, 1993) is an American competition swimmer who specializes in the backstroke, and is an Olympic gold medalist. Bootsma earned a gold medal as a member of the winning U.S. team in the 4×100-meter medley relay at the 2012 Summer Olympics, and also competed in the 100-meter backstroke.

== Career ==
Bootsma attended Eden Prairie High School in Eden Prairie, Minnesota. On November 20, 2010, Bootsma set the national high school record in the 100-yard backstroke with a time of 51.53, bettering Cindy Tran's record of 51.85 (Bootsma's record has since been broken). On October 16, 2011 at the Pan American Games, she broke the games' record in the 100-meter backstroke with a time of 1:00.37. Bootsma clocked a 29.56 on the way out before closing out the win with a 30.81 final 50 meters. The previous record was held by Elizabeth Pelton.

At the 2010 National Championships, the selection meet for both the 2010 Pan Pacific Swimming Championships and the 2011 World Aquatics Championships, Bootsma placed third in the 100-meter backstroke. At the 2010 Pan Pacific Swimming Championships, Bootsma earned a bronze medal in the 50-meter backstroke, tying with Emily Thomas of New Zealand and Fabiola Molina of Brazil.

After graduating high school in 2012, Bootsma attended the University of California, Berkeley, where she swam for Teri McKeever's California Golden Bears women's swimming team. In 2013 and 2015, she was NCAA national champion in the 100-yard backstroke.

=== 2012 Summer Olympics ===
At the 2012 U.S. Olympic Trials in Omaha, Nebraska, the U.S. qualifying meet for the Olympics, Bootsma earned a place on the U.S. Olympic team for the first time by finishing second behind Missy Franklin in the 100-meter backstroke with a time of 59.49. In the heats and semi-finals, Bootsma posted times of 59.69 and 59.10, placing behind Franklin both times. In placing second, she defeated her childhood idol, Natalie Coughlin, who finished third.

At the 2012 Summer Olympics in London, Bootsma posted a time of 1.00.03 in the heats for the 100-meter backstroke, finishing in eleventh place overall and qualifying for a place in the semifinals. She then finished in sixth place of semi-final 2 with a time of 1.00.04, failing to gain a place in the final. Bootsma earned a gold medal as a member of the winning U.S. team in the 4×100-meter medley relay. She swam the backstroke leg in the preliminary races, helping the U.S. team win a spot in the final.

== Personal bests ==
Event	Time	Date	Note(s)
50 m backstroke (long course)	27.68	June 27, 2013	NR
100 m backstroke (long course)	59.10	June 26, 2012	
200 m backstroke (long course)	2:18.08	August 2009	

== See also ==
- List of Olympic medalists in swimming (women)
- California Golden Bears
