= Sophie Edington =

Australian swimmer

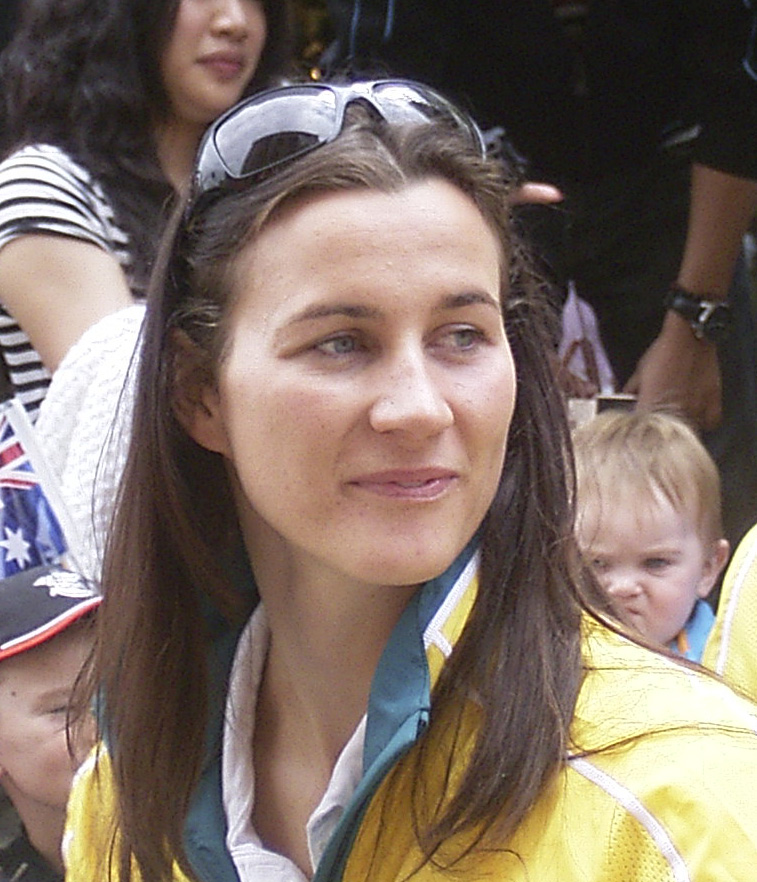

Personal information
- Full name: Sophie Jane Edington
- Nickname: "Soph"
- National team: Australia
- Born: 12 December 1984 (age 41) Loxton, South Australia
- Height: 1.79 m (5 ft 10 in)
- Weight: 65 kg (143 lb)

Sport
- Sport: Swimming
- Strokes: Backstroke, freestyle
- Club: Kingscliff SC; Melbourne Vicentre
Medal record
Women's swimming
Representing Australia
World Championships (LC)
Gold medal – first place	2005 Montreal	4×100 m medley
Gold medal – first place	2005 Montreal	4×100 m freestyle
World Championships (SC)
Gold medal – first place	2004 Indianapolis	4×100 m medley
Gold medal – first place	2006 Shanghai	4×100 m medley
Silver medal – second place	2006 Shanghai	4×100 m freestyle
Bronze medal – third place	2004 Indianapolis	50 m backstroke
Bronze medal – third place	2004 Indianapolis	100 m backstroke
Bronze medal – third place	2004 Indianapolis	4×100 m freestyle
Pan Pacific Championships
Gold medal – first place	2010 Irvine	50 m backstroke
Commonwealth Games
Gold medal – first place	2006 Melbourne	50 m backstroke
Gold medal – first place	2006 Melbourne	100 m backstroke
Gold medal – first place	2006 Melbourne	4×100 m medley
Gold medal – first place	2010 Delhi	50 m backstroke

Sophie Jane Edington (born 12 December 1984) is an Australian backstroke and freestyle swimmer.

== Biography ==
Edington trained at the Kingscliff ASC club under Greg Salter. After Salter took up an overseas coaching role Edington moved to Queensland to train under the QAS program from the end of 2008. In 2010, she moved to Melbourne where she trained at MSAC. At the 2005 World Aquatics Championships in Montréal she won two gold medals, with the backstroke leg in 4×100-metre medley relay, and as a heat swimmer in the 4×100-metre freestyle relay. She won three gold medals at the 2006 Commonwealth Games in Melbourne: 50-metre and 100-metre backstroke, and the 4×100-metre medley relay in world record time of 3:56.30 seconds with teammates Leisel Jones, Libby Lenton and Jessicah Schipper. Edington set a new world record for the 50-metre backstroke at the 2008 Australian Olympic Trials. She was part of the relay team in 2004 that broke the World Record at the world short course championships. Four years after winning three gold medals at the Melbourne Commonwealth Games, Edington was successful in defending the 50m backstroke title to claim her fourth Commonwealth gold medal at Delhi in 2010.

After narrowly missing the 2012 Olympic team, Edington competed in the European summer circuit prior to working with Channel 7 News during the London Games. Continuing in the sports world, Edington moved to Switzerland and worked at the International Olympic Committee until the end of 2014. Edington now works for The Cambridge Strategy (Asset Management) and resides in Monaco.

Edington is pursuing a Doctorate of Business Administration at the International School of Management in Paris.

== See also ==
- List of World Aquatics Championships medalists in swimming (women)
- List of Commonwealth Games medallists in swimming (women)
- Commonwealth Games records in swimming
- World record progression 50 metres backstroke
- World record progression 4 × 100 metres medley relay

Records
Preceded by Emily Seebohm	Women's 50 metre backstroke world record-holder (long course); 23 March 2008 – 9 April 2009	Succeeded by shared between Sophie Edington & Zhao Jing
Preceded by Sophie Edington & Zhao Jing	Women's 50 metre backstroke world record-holder (long course); 9 April 2009 – 26 June 2009	Succeeded by Daniela Samulski
Preceded by Giaan Rooney; Leisel Jones; Petria Thomas; Jodie Henry	Women's 4 x 100 metres medley relay world record-holder (long course); 21 March 2004 – 31 March 2007 Sophie Edington; Leisel Jones; Jessicah Schipper; Libby Lenton	Succeeded by Emily Seebohm; Leisel Jones; Jessicah Schipper; Libby Lenton
Sporting positions
Preceded by Tara Kirk	Mare Nostrum Tour Overall Winner; 2008	Succeeded by Anastasia Zuyeva
