= Grace Loh =

Australian swimmer

Personal information
- Full name: Grace Elizabeth Loh
- Nationality: Australian
- Born: 1 August 1991 (age 35) Kew, Victoria, Australia
- Height: 1.68 m (5 ft 6 in)
- Weight: 64 kg (141 lb)

Sport
- Sport: Swimming
- Strokes: Backstroke
- Club: MSAC
- Coach: Craig Jackson / Ian Pope
Medal record
Women's swimming
Representing Australia
World Championships (SC)
Silver medal – second place	2012 Istanbul	4×100 m medley
Universiade
Bronze medal – third place	2011 Shenzhen	50 m backstroke
FINA Youth World Swimming Championships
Gold medal – first place	2008 Monterrey	50 m backstroke
Gold medal – first place	2008 Monterrey	100 m backstroke
Silver medal – second place	2008 Monterrey	4×100 m medley

Grace Elizabeth Loh (born 1 August 1991) is a competitive Australian swimmer. She was Australia's first World Junior Swimming Champion.

Loh won the women's 50m and 100m backstroke events at the 2nd FINA Youth World Swimming Championships in Monterrey, Mexico. The competition ran from 8 to 13 July 2008, and attracted over 600 swimmers from over 66 countries with strong contingents from major swimming nations (including USA, Great Britain, Russia and Japan).

At the Australian Short Course Championship held in Melbourne from 20 to 24 September 2008, Loh won her first national title in the 100m backstroke, following up with a silver medal in the 50m sprint event.

At the 2010 Telstra Australian Swimming Championships she came 3rd in the 50m Backstroke in 28.52

Loh also came first in the 3rd heat of the 50m backstroke at the 2010 Commonwealth Games in Delhi, finishing 5th in the final.
