= Gemma Spofforth =

British swimmer (born 1987)

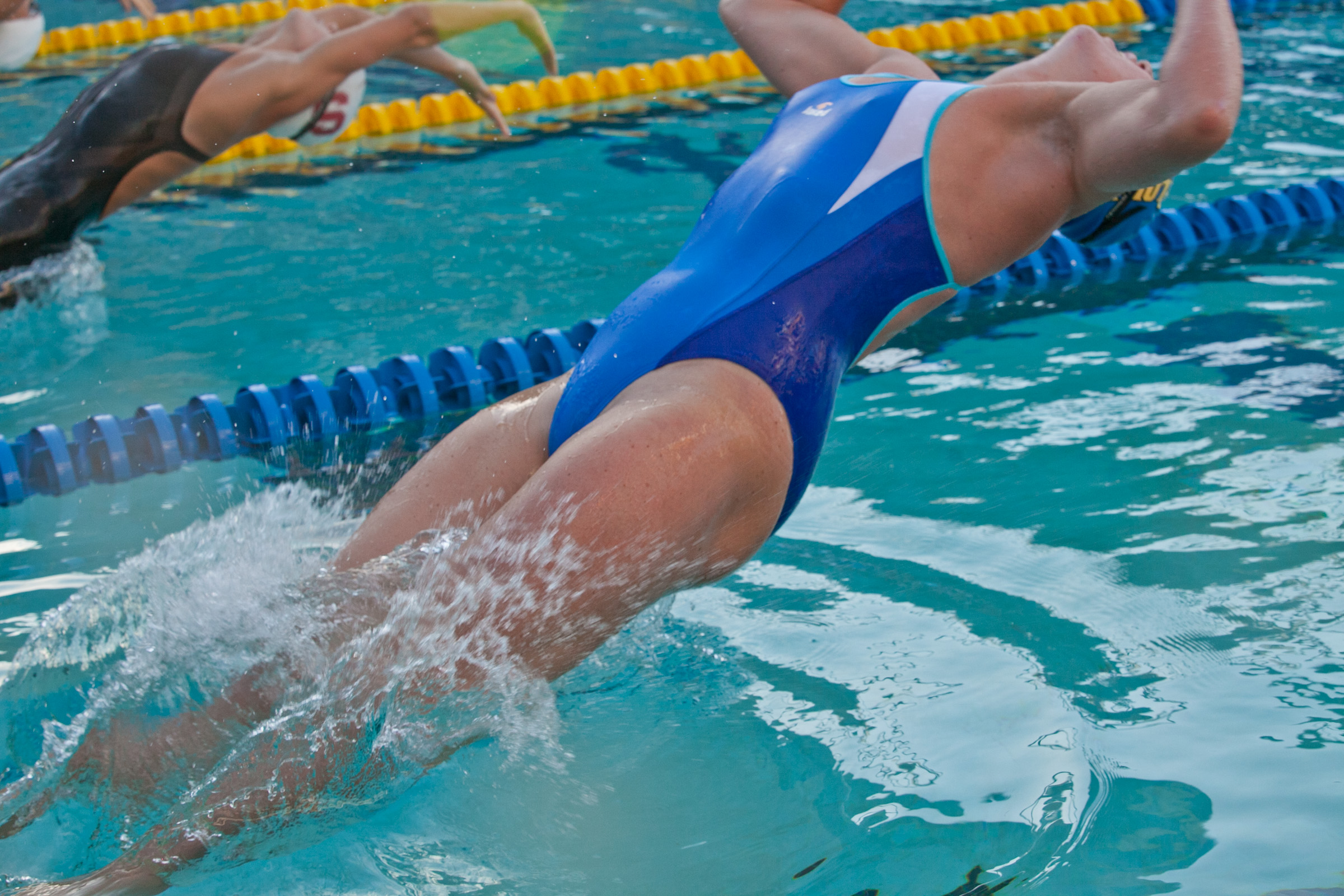

Personal information
- Full name: Gemma Mary Spofforth
- National team: Great Britain
- Born: 17 November 1987 (age 38) Shoreham-by-Sea, England
- Height: 1.86 m (6 ft 1 in)
- Weight: 73 kg (161 lb; 11.5 st)

Sport
- Sport: Swimming
- Strokes: Backstroke
- Club: Portsmouth Northsea
- College team: University of Florida (US)
Medal record
Women's swimming
Representing Great Britain
World Championships – Long Course
Gold medal – first place	2009 Rome	100 m backstroke
European Championships – Long Course
Gold medal – first place	2010 Budapest	100 m backstroke
Gold medal – first place	2010 Budapest	4x100 m medley
Silver medal – second place	2010 Budapest	200 m backstroke
European Championships – Short Course
Bronze medal – third place	2004 Vienna	200 m backstroke
Representing England
Commonwealth Games
Silver medal – second place	2010 Delhi	100 m backstroke
Silver medal – second place	2010 Delhi	50 m backstroke
Silver medal – second place	2010 Delhi	4x100 m medley

Gemma Mary Spofforth (born 17 November 1987) is an English former competition swimmer who represented Great Britain in the Olympics, FINA world championships and European championships, and England in the Commonwealth Games. Spofforth is the former world record-holder and former world champion in the 100-metre backstroke, and won a total of eight medals in major international championships.

Spofforth was born in Shoreham-by-Sea, England.

Spofforth represented 2008 Summer Olympics in Beijing, China, coming fourth in the 100-metre backstroke, four one-hundredths of a second (0.04) behind bronze medalist Margaret Hoelzer. She also came ninth in the 200-metre backstroke.

At the 2009 World Aquatic Championships in Rome, she took the gold medal in the 100-metre backstroke, in a world record time of 58.12 seconds. Spofforth broke the 100-metre Backstroke world record on her way to winning her first world title in Rome, her time of 58.12 erased previous record holder Anastasia Zuyeva time of 58.48 set in the semi-finals of the event.

Spofforth accepted an athletic scholarship to attend the University of Florida in Gainesville, Florida, where she swam for coach Gregg Troy's Florida Gators swimming and diving team in National Collegiate Athletic Association (NCAA) and Southeastern Conference (SEC) competition from 2007 to 2010. During her four seasons of American college swimming, she won seven NCAA national championships, including three titles in the 100-yard backstroke (2008, 2009, 2010), three in the 200-yard backstroke (2007, 2008, 2009), and one in the 200-yard freestyle relay (2010), and was a key contributor to the Gators winning the NCAA national team championship in 2010. She received eleven All-American honours and four All-Southeastern Conference (SEC) selections, was a two-time SEC champion, and set two SEC records.

She was a member of Great Britain's 2012 Olympic team, and competed in the 100-metre backstroke event at the 2012 Summer Olympics in London, where she achieved fifth place in 59.20 seconds. After the 2012 Olympics, Spofforth announced her retirement from competitive swimming.

== Personal bests and records held ==
Event	Long course	Short course
50 m backstroke	27.92	28.63
100 m backstroke	58.12	57.17
200 m backstroke	2:06.66	2:04.95
Key CR:Commonwealth NR:British

== See also ==
- List of United States records in swimming
- List of University of Florida Olympians
- List of World Aquatics Championships medalists in swimming (women)
- List of world records in swimming
- World record progression 100 metres backstroke

Records
Preceded by Anastasia Zuyeva	Women's 100-metre backstroke world record holder (long course); 28 July 2009 – 25 July 2017	Succeeded by Kylie Masse
