= Julia Wilkinson =

Canadian swimmer (born 1987)

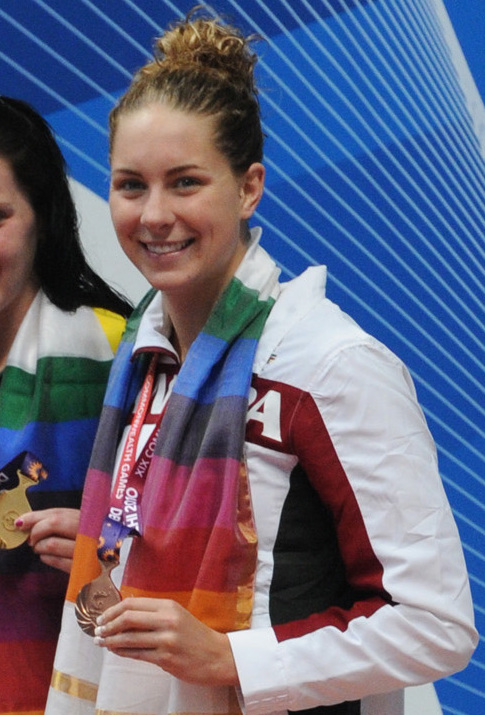
- Wilkinson at 2010 Delhi Commonwealth Games

Personal information
- Full name: Julia Rose Wilkinson
- National team: Canada
- Born: June 12, 1987 (age 39) Stratford, Ontario, Canada
- Occupations: Marketing, communications
- Height: 1.78 m (5 ft 10 in)
- Weight: 70 kg (154 lb)
- Spouse: Shane Minks (2013)

Sport
- Sport: Swimming
- Strokes: Backstroke, medley, freestyle
- Club: Stratford Kinsmen "Y"; North York Aquatic Club (NYAC)
- College team: Texas A&M University
- Coach: Andrew Ethier (Stratford Y); Murray Drudge (NYAC); Steve Bultman (Texas A&M); Randy Benett (National Team)
Medal record
Women's swimming
Representing Canada
Pan Pacific Championships
| Silver medal – second place | 2006 Victoria | 4x100 m free relay |
| Bronze medal – third place | 2010 Irvine | 4x100 m freestyle |
| Bronze medal – third place | 2010 Irvine | 4x200 m freestyle |
Commonwealth Games
| Bronze medal – third place | 2010 Delhi | 100 m backstroke |
| Bronze medal – third place | 2010 Delhi | 200 m medley |
| Bronze medal – third place | 2010 Delhi | 4x100 m medley relay |

Julia Rose Wilkinson (born June 12, 1987) is a Canadian former competitive swimmer who competed for Texas A&M University, swam in major international championships, and competed for Canada in the 2008 Beijing and 2012 London Olympics. She specialized in backstroke, medley and freestyle events, and was a Canadian record holder in backstroke and freestyle. After her Olympic career, she worked in coaching, and sports broadcasting for Fox, and in marketing and communications after 2016 with the Canadian Tire Company in Toronto.

== Early life and swimming ==
Wilkinson was born in Stratford, Ontario on June 12, 1987 to father Dr. Mark Wilkinson and mother Mary Wilkinson, who served as an 8th grade English teacher. Both parents originally hailed from Windsor, Ontario, and encouraged Julia to pursue sports with her mother taking Julia to local swim lessons from a very early age. With her parents support, Julia began training and competition in elementary school. Her older sister Jane also swam competitively, and later competed on the collegiate level. Julia attended High School at Stratford Central Secondary School through her Junior year. She obtained most of her early competitive training and opportunities for competition through the Stratford YMCA Club in Stratford, Ontario though it had only four lanes and was around only 25-yards in length. At the Stratford pool, she swam for the Stratford Kinsmen Y Aquatic Club, where from ages 11-17 she was under the direction of Coach Andrew Ethier. She credited Ethier with much of her early success and focus on the sport. Her Stratford YMCA training sessions frequently began at 5:30 am, as the pool was often busy with lessons and open swim.

=== North York Aquatic Club ===
After eleventh grade she relocated to Toronto, Ontario, about 90 miles Northeast of Stratford, and attended Vaughan Road Academy. In Toronto, she trained with the more competitive North York Aquatic Club under Head Coach Murray Drudge, who coached the club through 2019. In 2005 she graduated Vaughan Road Academy where she was an Honor roll member, and was in the band and Student Council. As an outstanding program, while at North York Aquatic Club, Drudge managed several national champions and helped lead Stephanie Richardson in 1996 and Kyle Smerdon in 2000 to Olympic team berths.

== Texas A&M ==
Julia attended Texas A&M University on an athletic scholarship from 2005-2010 where she swam under Head Coach Steve Bultman, and majored in communications with minors in English and sports management. She finished her collegiate swimming career with 20 conference championships and 8 individual titles, a rare achievement for a Texas A&M swimmer. She held Texas A&M records in the 200 freestyle, 100 backstroke, and 200 Individual Medley. In 2008, she was named A&M's most valuable swimmer, and the Big 12 Women's Swimmer of the Year.

=== 2009 Big 12 Championship ===
At the Big 12 Championships in College Station Texas on February 24–27, 2009, Wilkinson carried her team to a victory upset against the #3 Texas Longhorns. She was named Outstanding Swimmer of the Meet with 6 first-place finishes and 1 second-place finish. The first night, the A&M women brought the crowd to its feet with a winning effort in the 800-yard freestyle relay. The Aggie foursome of senior Kristen Heiss, senior Melissa Hain, freshman Maureen McLaine and senior Julia Wilkinson hit the wall in an NCAA "A" cut of 7:01.63 to edge out the Longhorns (7:02.10). The Aggies trailed the Longhorns by more than a second after 600 yards, but Wilkinson closed with an impressive 1:43.41 split to overtake Texas’ Kathleen Hersey for the win. She continued her dominance in the 200-yard freestyle relay where Aggies trailed after the first 100 yards by .39 of a second, but Woods turned in a third-leg split of 22.20 and Wilkinson went 22.00 on the anchor for the win out-touching Longhorns 1:29.31 to 1:29.45. In the 200 IM, Julia was first in an NCAA "A" cut time of 1:55.81. Continuing on, Julia finished first in the 100 back with a season's best of 52.77 and second in the 400 medley relay in 3:33.91. In the final day of competition, Julia set a new meet record bettering her old time with 47.74 in the 100 free. She helped set another meet record in the 400 free relay, where the foursome of Heiss, Doerge, Woods and Wilkinson hit the wall in a time of 3:15.23. Wilkinson entered the water facing a .66 second deficit, but turned in a 47.27 anchor split for the win.

Despite a shoulder injury in 2008 after the Olympics which required surgery, Wilkinson was instrumental in the late 2009-2010 season in A&M’s dual victory against Missouri, winning three individual events and swimming the backstroke on the first-place 200 medley relay. She also swam in four winning relays as the Aggies claimed the team title at the Big 12 Relays. She received the Big 12 Swimming of the Week Award for her performance.

=== 2010 NCAAs ===
At the 2010 NCAA's Wilkinson became the first National Champion for Texas A&M by winning the 100 free with a time of 47.61 with swimmers from Georgia and California taking second and third. Her win was the first for the Aggies with a second win following from Alia Atkinson. Julia showed her dominating performance at the NCAAs in 2010 by taking 2nd in the 200 IM and 3rd in the 200 freestyle.

== Olympics ==
=== 2008 Beijing Olympics ===
At the March-April 2008 Canadian Olympic Trials, she broke the Canadian national record in the women's 200 meter freestyle in 1:58.73. She broke the Canadian record in the 100 m backstroke with her time of 1:01.41, automatically qualifying for the 2008 Summer Olympics. She broke the same record again by swimming the 100 m in 1:00.59 at the final swimming meet before the Olympics. Erin Gammel previously held the record with her 1:01.93 time set in 2005. The record was previously held by Jennifer Carroll, who set it in the 2003 World Championships. In July 2008, Wilkinson travelled with the Canadian team for pre-training in Singapore prior to the Olympics. Prior to Olympic competition, Wilkinson addressed her pre-event nervousness that sometimes affected her event performance, and worked with Canadian team sports psychologist Hap Davis.

Wilkinson qualified to compete in the 100 m back, 200 m free, 200 m individual medley, the 4 x 100 and 4 x 200 free, and the 4 x 100 medley relays at the 2008 Summer Olympics, making the finals in several events. In the 4 × 100 m relay, her team finished 8th, compiling a record time of 3:38:32. She dropped the 200 m freestyle to concentrate on the 200 m individual medley. In the 200 m individual medley, she finished in 7th place, with a time of 2:12.43, and in the 4 × 100 m medley event, she finished in 7th place.

=== 2012 London Olympics ===
At the Spring 2012 Canadian trials in Montreal, Wilkinson swam the 100-meter backstroke in a time of 59.85, a personal best. Her prior shoulder injury in 2009 may have influenced her decision to focus on distances not exceeding 100 meters in her trial events.

In the 2012 Summer Olympics in London, Wilkinson swam for Canada in the 100 m freestyle, the 100 m backstroke the 4 x 100 m freestyle relay and the 4 x 100 medley relays. She finished 13th in the 100-meter freestyle, 11th in the 4x100-meter freestyle relay, 9th in the 100-meter backstroke, and 12th in the 4x100-meter Medley Relay. She was disappointed in her ninth place finish in the 100-meter backstroke as she came up just .08 seconds short of making it to the finals.

== 2008–2010 International competition ==
At the 2008 Mel Zajac, Jr. International swim meet in Vancouver, British Columbia, she broke the Canadian record for the 50 m backstroke with her time of 28.53. The record was previously held by Jennifer Carroll, who set it in the 2003 World Championships.

In the summer of 2009, Julia represented Canada at the World Championships.

She was named to Canada's Senior National Team for the 2009–2010 season at the Canada Cup opening night in Toronto. She went on to win the 100 free that evening with 54.19 with no shoulder complications after her surgery and recovery.

She was nominated to carry the Vancouver 2010 Olympic Torch through her hometown of Stratford, Ontario on December 27, 2009. She cited the great support Stratford has given her in reaching her dreams.

In other international meets, she participated in both the 2006 Victoria and 2010 Irving Pan Pacific Games winning a silver in 2006 in Victoria, British Columbia, and two bronzes in Irving, California in 2010.

=== 2010 Commonwealth Games ===
Wilkinson entered in several events at the 2010 Delhi Commonwealth Games where she successfully earned a bronze medal in both the 200m individual medley, and the 100m backstroke under the management of Head Canadian team coach Randy Bennett. In a disappointing turn of events in the women's 4 × 100 m freestyle relay final, the Wilkinson's Canadian foursome clocked the second fastest time only to learn they had been disqualified due to an illegal takeover—this would have been Wilkinson's third medal in these Games.

After the 2012 Olympics, she returned to Victoria and resumed training with coach Randy Bennett who coached the Canadian National Swim team, and was the Canadian Olympic Team Coach when Wilkinson participated in 2012. Bennett coached at Victoria's High Performance Center beginning in 2008, and coached Canada's Senior National teams at the significant international meets, beginning in 2009.

=== Honors ===
An outstanding scholar, at A&M, she was a 2010 Distinguished Lettermen award winner, a 2009 Bill Erwin Scholar-Athlete, a first-team Academic All-Big 12 in three years, and an Academic All-American in both 2008 and 2010. She was admitted to the Texas A&M Hall of Fame in 2016. As an Olympian and Canadian record breaking swimmer who received most of her High School training from the Stratford Kinsmen "Y" club, in 2018 she was admitted to the Stratford Sports Wall of Fame.

== Marriage and post-swimming careers ==
Wilkinson married former Texas A&M baseball player Shane Minks around January 2013, though her marriage is not referenced in Canadian newspapers subsequent to 2014.

She retired from active competition in February 2013, after her marriage.

Prior to her retirement from swimming she taught a few clinics, coached swimming and worked with Swim Canada helping to restructure the website while being managed by Swim Canada's Media Information Director. From around 2013-2015 after her marriage, she settled in Texas for a period, wrote for Swimming World Magazine and worked with Nike Swim where she consulted in their swimwear design and serviced and recruited Nike-sponsored swim teams. In 2014, she served as a swimming broadcaster primarily for Fox. At the 2015 PanAm and Parapan Am games, she worked as a co-ordinator for engaging athletes planning to compete in the games.

Since 2016, she has used her Texas A&M degree in communications, to serve as a communications adviser, Senior writer, and Communications Director for Canadian Tire in Toronto, Ontario, Canada.
