= Belinda Hocking =

Australian swimmer

Personal information
- Nickname: "Bindy"
- National team: Australia
- Born: 14 September 1990 (age 35) Wangaratta, Victoria
- Height: 1.65 m (5 ft 5 in)
- Weight: 56 kg (123 lb)

Sport
- Sport: Swimming
- Strokes: Backstroke
- Club: Nunawading Swimming Club
- Coach: Rohan Taylor
Medal record
Women's swimming
Representing Australia
World Championships (LC)
Silver medal – second place	2011 Shanghai	200 m backstroke
Silver medal – second place	2013 Barcelona	200 m backstroke
Bronze medal – third place	2011 Shanghai	4×100 m medley
Pan Pacific Championships
Gold medal – first place	2014 Gold Coast	200 m backstroke
Silver medal – second place	2014 Gold Coast	100 m backstroke
Bronze medal – third place	2010 Irvine	200 m backstroke
Commonwealth Games
Gold medal – first place	2014 Glasgow	200 m backstroke
Gold medal – first place	2014 Glasgow	4×100 m medley
Bronze medal – third place	2014 Glasgow	100 m backstroke

Belinda Hocking is a retired Australian backstroke swimmer. She is an Australian Institute of Sport scholarship holder.

== Career ==
Hocking was fifth in the 200-metre back and sixth in the 50 and 100m back at the Telstra Australian Swimming Championships in Brisbane in December 2007, won gold in 4×200-metre freestyle and was fourth in 200-metre backstroke at the Junior Pan Pacific Championships in Maui, Hawaii, claimed gold in the 100- and 200-metre backstroke and 4×100-metre medley relay, to go with silver in the 4×100-metre and 4×200-metre freestyle relays at the Australian Youth Olympic Festival in Sydney, won gold in the 100- and 200-metre backstroke and bronze in the 200-metre freestyle at the Australian Age Championships in Perth, won silver in 100-metre backstroke, was fourth in 50-metre backstroke and fifth in 200-metre backstroke at the Telstra Australian Short Course Championships in Melbourne, and placed third in the 100-metre backstroke at the FINA World Cup in Sydney.

Hocking qualified for the 2008 Summer Olympics in Beijing, and came eighth in the 200-metre backstroke. She placed second in the 200-metre backstroke, and was third in 100-metre backstroke at the Australian Swimming Championships and Olympic Trials in Sydney. That year, she also won silver in the 4×100-metre medley (heat swim), and came fifth in the 100-metre backstroke and sixth in the 50-metre backstroke at the FINA World Short Course Championships in Manchester. She set a Commonwealth record in 50-metre backstroke at World Short Course Championships and she won 100- and 200-metre backstroke at the Monaco leg of the Mare Nostrum series. She was also second in 100- and 200-metre backstroke at the Barcelona leg of the Mare Nostrum series.

At the 2012 Summer Olympics, she competed in the 100 and 200 m backstroke events, finishing in 7th and 10th respectively.

At the 2014 Commonwealth Games, she won two gold medals in the 200 m backstroke and the 4 × 100 m medley relay, setting Commonwealth Games records in both. She also won a bronze medal in the 100 m backstroke.

She had to take a break from competing in 2015, after a series of accidents and injuries, including a shoulder injury which required surgery, a dislocated knee and a burn injury caused while studying. In 2015, she also began to study for a degree in primary education.

At the 2016 Summer Olympics in Rio de Janeiro, Hocking came fifth in the 200 metre backstroke.

Belinda Hocking announced her retirement from competitive Swimming on 3 March 2017.

== Personal ==
Hocking was born in Wangaratta, Victoria. She started swimming when she was 4.

She went to St. Bernard's Catholic Primary School in Wangaratta, and later swam at Nunawading Swimming Club.

== See also ==
- List of World Aquatics Championships medalists in swimming (women)
