= Sinéad Russell =

Canadian swimmer

Personal information
- Full name: Sinéad C. Russell
- National team: Canada
- Born: June 15, 1993 (age 33) Oshawa, Ontario, Canada
- Height: 1.76 m (5 ft 9 in)
- Weight: 69 kg (152 lb)

Sport
- Sport: Swimming
- Strokes: Backstroke
- Club: Blue Waves Swim Club
- College team: University of Florida
Medal record
Women's swimming
Representing Canada
Commonwealth Games
Bronze medal – third place	2014 Glasgow	4×100 m medley

Sinéad C. Russell (born June 15, 1993) is a Canadian competition swimmer from Burlington, Ontario who swam for the Oakville Dolphins swim club in Oakville, Ontario.

In March 2012, Russell competed at the 2012 Canadian Olympic swim trials in Montreal, where she qualified for two events, the 100 metre backstroke and the 200 metre backstroke. At the 2012 Summer Olympics in the women's 100-metre backstroke, Russell finished in 13th place in the heats and qualified for the semifinals, but did not secure a place in the finals. In the 200-metre backstroke heats, Russell was third in her heat and advanced to the semifinals. In the semifinals, she was in first position after the first length, touching the wall before eventual gold medal winner Missy Franklin, but lost speed and came third with a time of 2:08.76, which was still enough to qualify her for the 8th and final spot in the final. In the final, she finished 8th with a time of 2:09.86.

Russell attended the University of Florida on an athletic scholarship, and swam for coach Gregg Troy's Florida Gators swimming and diving team in National Collegiate Athletic Association (NCAA) and Southeastern Conference (SEC) competition in 2013 and 2014, while continuing to swim at the international level with Swim Canada. During her freshman and sophomore seasons as a Gator, she received fourteen All-American honours, the most an American college swimmer may receive in two years.

Russell was sidelined with a blood clot in her brain in mid-January 2015.

She is the younger sister of Colin Russell, another Canadian swimmer who competed in the 2008 and 2012 Olympics.

== See also ==
- List of University of Florida alumni
- List of University of Florida Olympians
- List of Commonwealth Games medallists in swimming (women)
