= List of Kosovan records in swimming =

The Kosovar records in swimming are the fastest ever performances of swimmers from Kosovo, which are recognised and ratified by the Kosovo Swimming Federation (FNK).

All records were set in finals unless noted otherwise.

== Long Course (50 m) ==
=== Men ===
Event	Time		Name	Club	Date	Meet	Location	Ref
50 m freestyle	24.23	h	Lum Zhaveli	Kosovo	3 August 2012	-	Istanbul, Turkey	
50 m freestyle	24.06	h, #	Adell Sabovic	Ilirida	16 May 2024	Atlanta Classic	Atlanta, United States	
100 m freestyle	51.77	h	Adell Sabovic	Kosovo	30 July 2024	Olympic Games	Paris, France	
100 m freestyle	51.46	h, #	Adell Sabovic	Ilirida	16 May 2024	Atlanta Classic	Atlanta, United States	
200 m freestyle	1:58.03	h	Arti Krasniqi	Kosovo	20 May 2021	European Championships	Budapest, Hungary	
200 m freestyle	1:54.49	h, #	Adell Sabovic	Ilirida	16 May 2024	Atlanta Classic	Atlanta, United States	
400 m freestyle	4:03.39	h	Arti Krasniqi	Kosovo	17 May 2021	European Championships	Budapest, Hungary	
800 m freestyle	8:17.41		Arti Krasniqi	Kosovo	4 April 2021	Qualifikationswettkampf	Heidelberg, Germany	
1500 m freestyle	16:58.68		Mal Gashi	Kosovo	10 June 2022	Teuta Cup	Durrës, Albania	
50 m backstroke	27.81		Martin Muja	ZEN	28 May 2023	-	Kranj, Slovenia	
100 m backstroke	1:00.90	h	Martin Muja	Kosovo	16 August 2022	European Championships	Rome, Italy	
200 m backstroke	2:13.81		Arion Budima	Sc Step Prishtine	8 July 2026	Kosova Open Championships	Pristina, Kosovo	
50 m breaststroke	29.74	h	Dasar Xhambazi	Kosovo	20 August 2019	World Junior Championships	Budapest, Hungary	
100 m breaststroke	1:09.34		Lum Zhaveli	Kosovo	3 August 2012	-	Istanbul, Turkey	
200 m breaststroke	2:37.08		Dasar Xhambazi	Kosovo	12 November 2017	-	Skopje, North Macedonia	
50 m butterfly	26.44		Bledion Meha	Dielli	7 July 2026	Kosova Open Championships	Pristina, Kosovo	
50 m butterfly	26.04	h, #	Arion Budima	Kosovo	10 August 2026	European Championships	Paris, France	
100 m butterfly	59.21		Arion Budima	Kosovo	29 March 2026	Multinations Junior Meet	Prague, Czech Republic	
100 m butterfly	56.93	h, #	Adell Sabovic	Ilirida	16 May 2024	Atlanta Classic	Atlanta, United States	
200 m butterfly	2:09.57		Alush Telaku	Kosovo	11 May 2024	Vienna International Meet	Vienna, Austria	
200 m individual medley	2:07.29	h	Art Kosumi	Kosovo	19 May 2021	European Championships	Budapest, Hungary	
400 m individual medley	5:03.71		Arion Budima	Step	24 May 2026	Orion Cup	Skopje, North Macedonia	
4×100 m freestyle relay	3:53.86		Dardan Vishi; Meriton Veliu; Eris Mustava; Vigan Bytyqi	Termopann - Prishtinë	11 September 2020	-	Durrës, Albania	
4×200 m freestyle relay	8:54.18		Desku Sidrit; Mal Gashi; Aron Zeka; Klevis Imeri	Step - Prishtinë	12 September 2020	-	Durrës, Albania	
4×100 m medley relay	4:28.37		Ardit Hysejni; Meriton Veliu; Vigan Bytyqi; Dardan Vishi	Termopann - Prishtinë	11 September 2020	-	Durrës, Albania	

Legend: # – Record awaiting ratification by FNK; WR – World record; ER – European record;
Records not set in finals: h – heat; sf – semifinal; r – relay 1st leg; rh – relay heat 1st leg; b – B final; † – en route to final mark; so – swim-off; tt – time trial

=== Women ===
Event	Time		Name	Club	Date	Meet	Location	Ref
50 m freestyle	26.65		Hana Beiqi	K.S.U OTRILA Prishtine	2 June 2024	International Basler Cup	Basel, Switzerland	
100 m freestyle	58.64		Hana Beiqi	Kosovo	10 May 2025	-	Dubrovnik, Croatia	
100 m freestyle	57.57	#	Hana Beiqi	Kosovo	1 August 2026	Slovenian Championships	Maribor, Slovenia	
200 m freestyle	2:12.74		Riga Shala	Kosovo	9 May 2025	-	Dubrovnik, Croatia	
200 m freestyle	2:12.42	#	Hana Beiqi	Kosovo	2 August 2026	Slovenian Championships	Maribor, Slovenia	
400 m freestyle	4:31.62	†	Eda Zeqiri	Kosovo	15 January 2021	-	Geneva, Switzerland	
800 m freestyle	9:33.25		Eda Zeqiri	Kosovo	15 January 2021	-	Geneva, Switzerland	
1500 m freestyle	19:02.14		Eda Zeqiri	Kosovo	12 September 2020	-	Durrës, Albania	
50 m backstroke	29.70		Hana Beiqi	K.S.U OTRILA Prishtine	25 June 2025	Kosovan Championships	Zllakuqan, Kosovo	
100 m backstroke	1:04.95		Erina Idrizaj	Kosovo	9 May 2025	-	Dubrovnik, Croatia	
100 m backstroke	1:04.67	#	Hana Beiqi	Kosovo	31 July 2026	Slovenian Championships	Maribor, Slovenia	
200 m backstroke	2:24.30	h	Eda Zeqiri	Kosovo	24 April 2019	-	Győr, Hungary	
50 m breaststroke	35.00	h	Sara Imeri	Kosovo	2 March 2018	-	Bratislava, Czech Republic	
100 m breaststroke	1:16.32		Rida Haxhani	Sc Step Prishtine	20 February 2026	Slovenian Championships	Maribor, Slovenia	
200 m breaststroke	2:46.57		Olta Berisha	Kosovo	9 May 2026	International Competition "Golden Orlando"	Dubrovnik, Croatia	
50 m butterfly	28.09	h, #	Hana Beiqi	Kosovo	22 August 2026	Mediterranean Games	Taranto, Italy	
100 m butterfly	1:05.25		Hana Beiqi	K.S.U OTRILA Prishtine	29 March 2025	MM Maribor	Maribor, Slovenia	
200 m butterfly	2:31.35		Hana Fajzullahu	Kosovo	20 August 2019	-	Budapest, Hungary	
200 m individual medley	2:31.84		Jana Beqiri	Kosovo	21 June 2021	-	Durrës, Albania	
400 m individual medley	5:34.40		Eda Zeqiri	Kosovo	21 June 2021	-	Durrës, Albania	
4×100 m freestyle relay								
4×200 m freestyle relay								
4×100 m medley relay								

Legend: # – Record awaiting ratification by FNK; WR – World record; ER – European record;
Records not set in finals: h – heat; sf – semifinal; r – relay 1st leg; rh – relay heat 1st leg; b – B final; † – en route to final mark; so – swim-off; tt – time trial

== Short Course (25 m) ==
=== Men ===
Event	Time		Name	Club	Date	Meet	Location	Ref
50 m freestyle	23.90		Lum Zhaveli	Step Prishtina	16 November 2014	-	Skopje, North Macedonia	
100 m freestyle	51.70		Martin Muja	Nemo Prishtina	19 November 2022	-	Skopje, North Macedonia	
200 m freestyle	1:55.03	h	Mal Gashi	Step Prishtina	4 March 2023	-	Skopje, North Macedonia	
400 m freestyle	4:00.46	h	Mal Gashi	Kosovo	5 December 2023	European Championships	Otopeni, Romania	
800 m freestyle								
1500 m freestyle								
50 m backstroke	29.97	h	Dren Ukimeraj	Kosovo	17 December 2017	European Championships	Copenhagen, Denmark	
100 m backstroke								
200 m backstroke								
50 m breaststroke	31.39	h	Meriton Veliu	Kosovo	10 December 2016	World Championships	Windsor, Canada	
100 m breaststroke	1:10.67	h	Meriton Veliu	Kosovo	6 December 2016	World Championships	Windsor, Canada	
200 m breaststroke								
50 m butterfly	27.58	h	Meriton Veliu	Kosovo	9 December 2016	World Championships	Windsor, Canada	
100 m butterfly	59.96	h	Dion Dion	Kosovo	12 December 2018	World Championships	Hangzhou, China	
200 m butterfly								
100 m individual medley	1:05.28	h	Meriton Veliu	Kosovo	8 December 2016	World Championships	Windsor, Canada	
200 m individual medley								
400 m individual medley								
4×50 m freestyle relay								
4×100 m freestyle relay								
4×200 m freestyle relay								
4×50 m medley relay								
4×100 m medley relay								

Legend: # – Record awaiting ratification by FNK; WR – World record; ER – European record;
Records not set in finals: h – heat; sf – semifinal; r – relay 1st leg; rh – relay heat 1st leg; b – B final; † – en route to final mark; so – swim-off; tt – time trial

=== Women ===
Event	Time		Name	Club	Date	Meet	Location	Ref
50 m freestyle	27.45	h	Fjorda Shabani	Kosovo	15 December 2018	World Championships	Hangzhou, China	
100 m freestyle	1:02.09	h	Fjorda Shabani	Kosovo	12 December 2018	World Championships	Hangzhou, China	
200 m freestyle								
400 m freestyle								
800 m freestyle								
1500 m freestyle								
50m backstroke	31.55	h	Eda Zeqiri	Kosovo	14 December 2018	World Championships	Hangzhou, China	
100m backstroke	1:08.69	h	Eda Zeqiri	Kosovo	11 December 2018	World Championships	Hangzhou, China	
200 m backstroke								
50m breaststroke	34.00	h	Melisa Zhdrella	Kosovo	6 December 2016	World Championships	Windsor, Canada	
100m breaststroke	1:16.30	h	Melisa Zhdrella	Kosovo	9 December 2016	World Championships	Windsor, Canada	
200 m breaststroke								
50m butterfly	30.95	h	Flaka Pruthi	Kosovo	3 December 2015	European Championships	Netanya, Israel	
100 m butterfly								
200 m butterfly								
100m individual medley	1:12.12	h	Melisa Zhdrella	Kosovo	8 December 2016	World Championships	Windsor, Canada	
200 m individual medley								
400 m individual medley								
4×50 m freestyle relay								
4×100 m freestyle relay								
4×200 m freestyle relay								
4×50 m medley relay								
4×100 m medley relay								

Legend: # – Record awaiting ratification by FNK; WR – World record; ER – European record;
Records not set in finals: h – heat; sf – semifinal; r – relay 1st leg; rh – relay heat 1st leg; b – B final; † – en route to final mark; so – swim-off; tt – time trial
