= Kosovo at the 2015 World Aquatics Championships =

- Flag of Kosovo
- FINA code: KOS
- National federation: Kosovo Swimming Federation

in Kazan, Russia
- Competitors: 4 in 1 sport
- Medals: Gold 0 Silver 0 Bronze 0 Total 0

World Aquatics Championships appearances
- 2015; 2017; 2019; 2022; 2023; 2024

Other related appearances
- Yugoslavia (1973–1991); Serbia and Montenegro (1998–2005); Serbia (2007–2013)

Kosovo competed at the 2015 World Aquatics Championships in Kazan, Russia from 24 July to 9 August 2015. This will be Kosovo's first participation at the World Championships since gaining membership by FINA in February 2015.

== Swimming ==
Kosovar swimmers have achieved qualifying standards in the following events (up to a maximum of 2 swimmers in each event at the A-standard entry time, and 1 at the B-standard):

Men

Athlete	Event	Heat		Semifinal		Final	
Athlete	Event	Time	Rank	Time	Rank	Time	Rank
Meriton Veliu	100 m freestyle	1:00.41	109	did not advance			
Meriton Veliu	50 m butterfly	28.67	65	did not advance			
Lum Zhaveli	50 m freestyle	24.91	74	did not advance			
Lum Zhaveli	50 m breaststroke	30.95	59	did not advance			

Women

Athlete	Event	Heat		Semifinal		Final	
Athlete	Event	Time	Rank	Time	Rank	Time	Rank
Flaka Pruthi	50 m freestyle	30.16	89	did not advance			
Flaka Pruthi	100 m backstroke	1:14.29	63	did not advance			
Rita Zeqiri	50 m backstroke	33.65	46	did not advance			
