= Kosovo at the 2017 World Aquatics Championships =

- Flag of Kosovo
- FINA code: KOS
- National federation: Kosovo Swimming Federation

in Budapest, Hungary
- Competitors: 4 in 1 sport
- Medals: Gold 0 Silver 0 Bronze 0 Total 0

World Aquatics Championships appearances
- 2015; 2017; 2019; 2022; 2023; 2024

Other related appearances
- Yugoslavia (1973–1991); Serbia and Montenegro (1998–2005); Serbia (2007–2013)

Kosovo competed at the 2017 World Aquatics Championships in Budapest, Hungary from 14 July to 30 July.

== Swimming ==
Kosovo has received a Universality invitation from FINA to send a maximum of four swimmers (two men and two women) to the World Championships.

Athlete	Event	Heat		Semifinal		Final	
Athlete	Event	Time	Rank	Time	Rank	Time	Rank
Dasar Xhambazi	Men's 50 m breaststroke	DNS		did not advance			
Dasar Xhambazi	Men's 100 m breaststroke	DNS		did not advance			
Lum Zhaveli	Men's 50 m freestyle	24.92	95	did not advance			
Lum Zhaveli	Men's 50 m butterfly	27.47	70	did not advance			
Flaka Pruthi	Women's 50 m freestyle	29.19	66	did not advance			
Flaka Pruthi	Women's 100 m freestyle	1:03.81	67	did not advance			
Melisa Zhdrella	Women's 50 m breaststroke	37.06	43	did not advance			
Melisa Zhdrella	Women's 100 m breaststroke	1:21.47	49	did not advance			
