= Kosovo at the 2016 Summer Olympics =

- IOC code: KOS
- NOC: Olympic Committee of Kosovo
- Website: noc-kosovo.org (in Albanian and Serbian)

in Rio de Janeiro
- Competitors: 8 in 5 sports
- Flag bearer: Majlinda Kelmendi
- Medals Ranked 54th: Gold 1 Silver 0 Bronze 0 Total 1

Summer Olympics appearances (overview)
- 2016; 2020; 2024

Other related appearances
- Yugoslavia (1920–1992W); Independent Olympic Participants (1992S); Serbia and Montenegro (1996–2006); Serbia (2008–2012)

Kosovo participated at the 2016 Summer Olympics in Rio de Janeiro, Brazil from 5 to 21 August 2016. It was represented by the Olympic Committee of Kosovo (KOK/OKK) with a delegation of eight people, including three men and five women. Most of them were awarded places in their respective sporting events through wild card entries and Tripartite Commission invitations. Two Kosovar athletes, on the other hand, qualified directly for the Olympics on merit: judoka Nora Gjakova (women's 57 kg) and Majlinda Kelmendi (women's 52 kg), the lone returning Olympian on the team after representing Albania four years earlier in London. The world's top-ranked judoka in her weight category and the frontrunner for the country's first Olympic medal, Kelmendi was selected to become Kosovo's flag bearer in the opening ceremony.

Kosovo left Rio de Janeiro with its first Olympic medal of any color, an Olympic gold medal, won by Kelmendi.

== Background ==
This was Kosovo's first participation in the Olympics since gaining membership by the International Olympic Committee (IOC) in December 2014. Serbia protested Kosovo's admission to the IOC, as it officially claims that Kosovo is an autonomous province of Serbia. However, Serbia, considering the harmful effects of Yugoslavia's expulsion in 1992, decided against boycotting the 2016 Rio Olympics as a consequence. Kosovo is currently recognised as a state by 97 UN member states.

== Medalists ==
Medal	Name	Sport	Event	Date
Gold	Majlinda Kelmendi	Judo	Women's 52 kg	7 August

== Athletics ==
Kosovar athletes achieved qualifying standards in the following athletics events (up to a maximum of 3 athletes in each event):

Key

- Note–Ranks given for track events are within the athlete's heat only
- Q = Qualified for the next round
- q = Qualified for the next round as a fastest loser or, in field events, by position without achieving the qualifying target
- NR = National record
- N/A = Round not applicable for the event
- Bye = Athlete not required to compete in round

Track & road events

Athlete	Event	Heat		Semifinal		Final	
Athlete	Event	Result	Rank	Result	Rank	Result	Rank
Musa Hajdari	Men's 800 m	1:48.41	7	Did not advance			
Vijona Kryeziu	Women's 400 m	54.30	7	Did not advance			

== Cycling ==
=== Road ===
Kosovo received an invitation from the Tripartite Commission to send a rider competing in the men's road race to the Olympics.

Athlete	Event	Time	Rank
Qëndrim Guri	Men's road race	Did not finish	

== Judo ==
Kosovo qualified two judokas for each of the following weight classes at the Games. Nora Gjakova and Majlinda Kelmendi, who previously represented Albania at the 2012 Summer Olympics, were ranked among the top 14 for women in the IJF World Ranking List of May 30, 2016.

Athlete	Event	Round of 32	Round of 16	Quarterfinals	Semifinals	Repechage	Final / BM	
Athlete	Event	Opposition Result	Opposition Result	Opposition Result	Opposition Result	Opposition Result	Opposition Result	Rank
Majlinda Kelmendi	Women's −52 kg	Bye	Tschopp (SUI); W 100–000	Legentil (MRI); W 000–000 S	Nakamura (JPN); W 000–000 S	Bye	Giuffrida (ITA); W 001–000	1st place, gold medalist(s)
Nora Gjakova	Women's −57 kg	Amarís (COL); W 100–000	Căprioriu (ROM); L 000–002	Did not advance				

== Shooting ==
Kosovo received an invitation from the Tripartite Commission to send a women's 10 m air rifle shooter to the Olympics, as long as the minimum qualifying score (MQS) was fulfilled by March 31, 2016.

Athlete	Event	Qualification		Final	
Athlete	Event	Points	Rank	Points	Rank
Urata Rama	Women's 10 m air rifle	402.3	48	Did not advance	

== Swimming ==
Kosovo received a universality invitation from FINA to send two swimmers (one male and one female) to the Olympics.

Athlete	Event	Heat		Semifinal		Final	
Athlete	Event	Time	Rank	Time	Rank	Time	Rank
Lum Zhaveli	Men's 50 m freestyle	24.53	57	Did not advance			
Rita Zeqiri	Women's 100 m backstroke	1:12.31 NR	34	Did not advance			
