= 2012 FINA World Swimming Championships (25 m) =

Water sport tournament in Istanbul

11th FINA World Swimming Championships (25 m)
- Host city: Istanbul, Turkey
- Date: 12–16 December 2012
- Venue: Sinan Erdem Dome
- Nations: 161
- Athletes: 958
- Events: 40

The 11th FINA World Swimming Championships (25m) were held in Istanbul, Turkey on 12–16 December 2012. This swimming-only championships took place in the Sinan Erdem Dome; all events were swum in a 25-meter (short-course) pool.

The United States topped the medal standings with a total of 27 medals and had the most gold medals with 11. A total of 18 championship records were set and 2 world records (both set by American Ryan Lochte) broken. Lochte and Hungarian Katinka Hosszú were named the best male and female swimmers of the competition. Lochte finished the meet with 8 total medals (breaking his previous record of 7 set in 2010) and Hosszú had 5 total medals.

== Bidding process ==
FINA announced on 12 April 2008 that Istanbul had defeated the only other bidder Vienna, Austria after a meeting of the FINA Bureau in Manchester, UK.

== Venue ==
The events took place at the Sinan Erdem Dome, which has a seating capacity of 22,500.

== Events ==
The swimming competition featured races in a short-course (25 m) pool in 40 events (20 for males, 20 for females; 17 individual events and 3 relays for each gender). Prelim events were held in the morning session and semi-finals/final in the evening session.

- Freestyle: 50, 100, 200, 400, 800 (women), and 1500 (men);
- Backstroke: 50, 100, and 200;
- Breaststroke: 50, 100, and 200;
- Butterfly: 50, 100, and 200;
- Individual medley: 100, 200, and 400;
- Relays: 4 × 100 free, 4 × 200 free; 4 × 100 medley

== Schedule ==
Date	Morning session Preliminary heats (10:00 EET)	Evening session Semi-finals and finals (19:00 EET)
Wednesday; 12 December	Men's 200 freestyle Women's 50 breaststroke Men's 100 backstroke Women's 200 butterfly Men's 100 breaststroke Women's 100 backstroke Men's 100 butterfly Women's 400 medley Men's 4 × 100 freestyle Women's 4 × 200 freestyle	Men's 200 freestyle (final); Women's 50 breaststroke (semi-finals); Men's 100 backstroke (semi-finals); Women's 200 butterfly (final); Men's 100 breaststroke (semi-finals); Women's 100 backstroke (semi-finals); Men's 100 butterfly (semi-finals); Women's 400 medley (final); Men's 4 × 100 freestyle (final); Women's 4 × 200 freestyle (final)
Thursday; 13 December	Women's 100 freestyle Men's 400 medley Women's 50 butterfly Men's 50 freestyle Women's 100 medley Men's 4 × 200 freestyle Women's 800 freestyle (slower heats)	Women's 100 freestyle (semi-finals); Men's 400 medley (final); Women's 50 breaststroke (final); Men's 100 backstroke (final); Women's 50 butterfly (semi-finals); Men's 50 freestyle (semi-finals); Women's 100 backstroke (final); Men's 100 breaststroke (final); Women's 100 medley (semi-finals); Men's 100 butterfly (final); Women's 800 freestyle (final); Men's 4 × 200 freestyle (final)
Friday; 14 December	Men's 50 backstroke Women's 200 backstroke Men's 50 butterfly Women's 100 breaststroke Men's 400 freestyle Men's 200 medley Women's 400 freestyle Men's 200 breaststroke Women's 4 × 100 medley	Men's 50 backstroke (semi-finals); Women's 100 freestyle (final); Men's 50 butterfly (semi-finals); Women's 200 backstroke (final); Men's 200 breaststroke (final); Women's 50 butterfly (final); Men's 400 freestyle (final); Women's 100 breaststroke (semi-finals); Women's 400 freestyle (final); Men's 50 freestyle (final); Men's 100 medley (final); Men's 200 medley (final); Women's 4 × 100 medley (final)
Saturday; 15 December	Women's 50 backstroke Men's 100 freestyle Women's 100 butterfly Men's 100 medley Women's 50 freestyle Women's 200 medley Men's 50 breaststroke Women's 4 × 100 freestyle	Women's 100 breaststroke (final); Men's 50 backstroke (final); Women's 50 backstroke (semi-finals); Men's 100 freestyle(semi-finals); Women's 50 freestyle (semi-finals); Men's 50 butterfly (final); Women's 100 butterfly(semi-finals); Men's 100 medley (semi-finals); Women's 200 medley (final); Men's 50 breaststroke(semi-finals); Women's 4 × 100 freestyle (final)
Sunday; 16 December	Men's 200 backstroke Women's 200 breaststroke Men's 200 butterfly Women's 200 freestyle Men's 4 × 100 medley Men's 1500 freestyle (slower heats)	Men's 100 freestyle (final); Women's 50 backstroke (final); Men's 200 backstroke (final); Women's 200 breaststroke (final); Men's 100 medley (final); Women's 100 butterfly (final); Men's 50 breaststroke (final); Women's 50 freestyle (final); Men's 200 butterfly (final); Men's 1500 freestyle (final); Women's 200 freestyle (final); Men's 4 × 100 medley (final)

== Medal summary ==
Rank	Nation	Gold	Silver	Bronze	Total
1	United States (USA)	11	8	8	27
2	China (CHN)	3	5	3	11
3	Hungary (HUN)	3	4	3	10
4	Denmark (DEN)	3	2	4	9
5	Russia (RUS)	2	3	4	9
6	Italy (ITA)	2	2	0	4
7	Germany (GER)	2	1	1	4
7	Japan (JPN)	2	1	1	4
9	Lithuania (LTU)	2	1	0	3
10	Australia (AUS)	1	5	3	9
11	Great Britain (GBR)	1	2	3	6
12	South Africa (RSA)	1	1	0	2
13	New Zealand (NZL)	1	0	2	3
13	Spain (ESP)	1	0	2	3
15	Brazil (BRA)	1	0	1	2
15	Poland (POL)	1	0	1	2
17	Belarus (BLR)	1	0	0	1
17	Norway (NOR)	1	0	0	1
17	Ukraine (UKR)	1	0	0	1
20	Jamaica (JAM)	0	2	0	2
20	Slovenia (SVN)	0	2	0	2
22	France (FRA)	0	1	1	2
23	Czech Republic (CZE)	0	0	1	1
23	Faroe Islands (FRO)	0	0	1	1
23	Trinidad and Tobago (TRI)	0	0	1	1
Totals (25 entries)		40	40	40	120

=== Changes in medal standings ===
In June 2013, Danish swimmer Mads Glæsner was stripped by FINA of a gold and bronze medal from the 400- and 1500-meter freestyle after testing positive for levomethamphetamine.

In January 2014 the Court of Arbitration for Sport partially overturned FINA's ruling and returned the gold medal in 1500 m freestyle.

List of changes in medal standings
Ruling date	Event	Nation	Gold	Silver	Bronze	Total
17 June 2013	Men's 400 metre freestyle	Denmark			−1	−1
17 June 2013	Men's 400 metre freestyle	New Zealand			+1	+1
17 June 2013	Men's 1500 metre freestyle	Denmark	−1			−1
17 June 2013	Men's 1500 metre freestyle	Italy	+1	−1		0
17 June 2013	Men's 1500 metre freestyle	Faroe Islands		+1	−1	0
17 June 2013	Men's 1500 metre freestyle	Poland			+1	+1
31 January 2014	Men's 1500 metre freestyle	Denmark	+1			+1
31 January 2014	Men's 1500 metre freestyle	Italy	-1	+1		0
31 January 2014	Men's 1500 metre freestyle	Faroe Islands		-1	+1	0
31 January 2014	Men's 1500 metre freestyle	Poland			-1	-1

== Results ==
=== Men's events ===
Event	Gold		Silver		Bronze	
Freestyle
50 m freestyle	Vladimir Morozov; Russia	20.55 NR	Florent Manaudou; France	20.88	Anthony Ervin; United States	20.99
100 m freestyle	Vladimir Morozov; Russia	45.65	Tommaso D'Orsogna; Australia	46.80	Yevgeny Lagunov; Russia	46.81
200 m freestyle	Ryan Lochte; United States	1:41.92	Paul Biedermann; Germany	1:42.07	Conor Dwyer; United States	1:43.78
400 m freestyle	Paul Biedermann; Germany	3:39.15	Hao Yun; China	3:39.48	Matthew Stanley; New Zealand	3:41.01
1500 m freestyle	Mads Glæsner; Denmark	14:30.01	Gregorio Paltrinieri; Italy	14:31.13	Pál Joensen; Faroe Islands	14:36.93
Backstroke
50 m backstroke	Robert Hurley; Australia	23.04	Matt Grevers; United States	23.17	Stanislav Donets; Russia	23.19
100 m backstroke	Matt Grevers; United States	49.89	Stanislav Donets; Russia	49.91	Guilherme Guido; Brazil	50.50
200 m backstroke	Radosław Kawęcki; Poland	1:48.48	Ryan Lochte; United States	1:48.50	Ryan Murphy; United States	1:48.86
Breaststroke
50 m breaststroke	Aleksander Hetland; Norway	26.30	Damir Dugonjič; Slovenia	26.32	Florent Manaudou; France	26.33
100 m breaststroke	Fabio Scozzoli; Italy	57.10	Damir Dugonjič; Slovenia	57.32	Kevin Cordes; United States	57.83
200 m breaststroke	Dániel Gyurta; Hungary	2:01.35 CR	Michael Jamieson (United Kingdom) Great Britain	2:03.00	Viatcheslav Sinkevich; Russia	2:03.08
Butterfly
50 m butterfly	Nicholas Santos; Brazil	22.22 CR	Chad le Clos; South Africa	22.26	Tom Shields; United States	22.46 NR
100 butterfly	Chad le Clos; South Africa	48.82 CR, AF	Tom Shields; United States	49.54	Ryan Lochte; United States	49.59
200 m butterfly	Kazuya Kaneda; Japan	1:51.01 CR	László Cseh; Hungary	1:51.66	Nikolay Skvortsov; Russia	1:52.33
Individual medley
100 m individual medley	Ryan Lochte; United States	51.21	Kenneth To; Australia	51.38	George Bovell; Trinidad and Tobago	51.66
200 m individual medley	Ryan Lochte; United States	1:49.63 WR	Daiya Seto; Japan	1:52.80	László Cseh; Hungary	1:52.89
400 m individual medley	Daiya Seto; Japan	3:59.15 AS	László Cseh; Hungary	4:00.50	Dávid Verrasztó; Hungary	4:02.87
Relays
4 × 100 m freestyle relay	United States; Anthony Ervin (47.28); Ryan Lochte (45.64); Jimmy Feigen (47.25); Matt Grevers (46.23); Garrett Weber-Gale^{[a]} Tyler Reed^{[a]}	3:06.40	Italy; Luca Dotto (46.84); Marco Orsi (45.94); Michele Santucci (47.46); Filippo Magnini (46.83)	3:07.07	Australia; Tommaso D'Orsogna (46.68); Kyle Richardson (46.92); Travis Mahoney (47.32); Kenneth To (46.35)	3:07.27
4 × 200 m freestyle relay	United States; Ryan Lochte (1:41.17); Conor Dwyer (1:43.04); Michael Klueh (1:43.04); Matt McLean (1:43.99); Garrett Weber-Gale^{[a]} Michael Weiss^{[a]}	6:51.40	Australia; Tommaso D'Orsogna (1:42.49); Jarrod Killey (1:42.82); Kyle Richardson (1:44.59); Robert Hurley (1:42.39); Travis Mahoney^{[a]}	6:52.29	Germany; Paul Biedermann (1:41.93); Dimitri Colupaev (1:42.96); Christoph Fildebrandt (1:45.40); Yannick Lebherz (1:42.93)	6:53.22
4 × 100 m medley relay	United States; Matt Grevers (50.00); Kevin Cordes (57.15); Tom Shields (48.66); Ryan Lochte (45.22); Ryan Murphy^{[a]} Mihail Alexandrov^{[a]} Anthony Ervin^{[a]}	3:21.03	Russia; Stanislav Donets (50.10); Viatcheslav Sinkevich (57.54); Nikolay Skvortsov (50.27); Vladimir Morozov (44.95); Viacheslav Prudnikov^{[a]} Yevgeny Lagunov^{[a]}	3:22.86	Australia; Robert Hurley (50.44); Kenneth To (57.44); Grant Irvine (50.75); Tommaso D'Orsogna (46.14); Kyle Richardson^{[a]}	3:24.77

^{a} Swimmers who participated in the heats only and received medals.

=== Women's events ===
Event	Gold		Silver		Bronze	
Freestyle
50 m freestyle	Aleksandra Gerasimenya; Belarus	23.64	Francesca Halsall (United Kingdom) Great Britain	23.87	Jeanette Ottesen; Denmark	24.00
100 m freestyle	Britta Steffen; Germany	52.31	Megan Romano; United States	52.48	Tang Yi; China	52.73
200 m freestyle	Allison Schmitt; United States	1:53.59	Katinka Hosszú; Hungary	1:54.31	Melanie Costa; Spain	1:54.45
400 m freestyle	Melanie Costa; Spain	4:01.18	Chloe Sutton; United States	4:01.20	Lauren Boyle; New Zealand	4:01.24
800 m freestyle	Lauren Boyle; New Zealand	8:08.62 OC	Lotte Friis; Denmark	8:10.99	Chloe Sutton; United States	8:15.53
Backstroke
50 m backstroke	Zhao Jing; China	25.95 CR	Olivia Smoliga; United States	26.13 NR	Aleksandra Urbanczyk; Poland	26.50
100 m backstroke	Olivia Smoliga; United States	56.64	Mie Nielsen; Denmark	57.07 NR	Simona Baumrtová; Czech Republic	57.18 NR
200 m backstroke	Daryna Zevina; Ukraine	2:02.24	Bonnie Brandon; United States	2:03.19	Duane Da Rocha; Spain	2:04.15
Breaststroke
50 m breaststroke	Rūta Meilutytė; Lithuania	29.44 CR, ER	Alia Atkinson; Jamaica	29.67 NR	Sarah Katsoulis; Australia	29.94
100 m breaststroke	Rūta Meilutytė; Lithuania	1:03.52 CR, ER	Alia Atkinson; Jamaica	1:03.80 NR	Rikke Møller Pedersen; Denmark	1:04.05
200 m breaststroke	Rikke Møller Pedersen; Denmark	2:16.08 CR	Laura Sogar; United States	2:16.93	Kanako Watanabe; Japan	2:19.39
Butterfly
50 m butterfly	Lu Ying; China	25.14	Jiao Liuyang; China	25.23	Jeanette Ottesen; Denmark	25.55
100 butterfly	Ilaria Bianchi; Italy	56.13	Liu Zige; China	56.58	Jemma Lowe (United Kingdom) Great Britain	56.66
200 m butterfly	Katinka Hosszú; Hungary	2:02.20 CR, ER	Jiao Liuyang; China	2:02.28	Jemma Lowe (United Kingdom) Great Britain	2:03.19
Individual medley
100 m individual medley	Katinka Hosszú; Hungary	58.49 CR	Rūta Meilutytė; Lithuania	58.79 NR	Zhao Jing; China	58.80
200 m individual medley	Ye Shiwen; China	2:04.64 CR	Katinka Hosszú; Hungary	2:04.72	Hannah Miley (United Kingdom) Great Britain	2:07.12
400 m individual medley	Hannah Miley (United Kingdom) Great Britain	4:23.14 CR, ER	Ye Shiwen; China	4:23.33 AS	Katinka Hosszú; Hungary	4:25.95
Relays
4 × 100 m freestyle relay	United States; Megan Romano (52.86); Jessica Hardy (53.32); Lia Neal (52.44); Allison Schmitt (52.39); Shannon Vreeland^{[b]} Olivia Smoliga^{[b]}	3:31.01	Australia; Angie Bainbridge (53.04); Marieke Guehrer (52.32); Brianna Throssell (54.19); Sally Foster (53.35)	3:32.90	Denmark; Mie Nielsen (53.07); Pernille Blume (53.61); Kelly Rasmussen (54.59); Jeanette Ottesen (52.24)	3:33.51
4 × 200 m freestyle relay	United States; Megan Romano (1:56.03); Chelsea Chenault (1:54.78); Shannon Vreeland (1:55.43); Allison Schmitt (1:53.01); Jasmine Tosky^{[b]}	7:39.25	Russia; Veronika Popova (1:55.36); Elena Sokolova (1:55.61); Daria Belyakina (1:55.73); Ksenia Yuskova (1:56.07)	7:42.77	China; Qiu Yuhan (1:57.30); Pang Jiaying (1:56.72); Guo Junjun (1:55.91); Tang Yi (1:53.33); Wang Fei^{[b]}	7:43.26
4 × 100 m medley relay	Denmark; Mie Nielsen (56.73); Rikke Møller Pedersen (1:03.48); Jeanette Ottesen (56.49); Pernille Blume (53.17)	3:49.87	Australia; Rachel Goh (58.16); Sarah Katsoulis (1:03.89); Marieke Guehrer (56.36); Angie Bainbridge (52.47); Grace Loh^{[b]} Samantha Marshall^{[b]} Brianna Throssell^{[b]} Sally Foster^{[b]}	3:50.88	United States; Olivia Smoliga (57.25); Jessica Hardy (1:04.61); Claire Donahue (57.67); Megan Romano (51.90); Laura Sogar^{[b]} Christine Magnuson^{[b]} Lia Neal^{[b]}	3:51.43

^{b} Swimmers who participated in the heats only and received medals.

== Championship and world records broken ==
=== Men ===
Event	Date	Round	Name	Nationality	Time	Record	Day
Men's 100 m freestyle^{[c]}	12 December	Final	Vladimir Morozov	Russia	45.52	CR	1
Men's 100 m butterfly	13 December	Final	Chad le Clos	South Africa	48.82	CR	2
Men's 50 m butterfly	14 December	Heats	Nicholas Santos	Brazil	22.40	=CR	3
Men's 50 m butterfly	14 December	Semifinal	Nicholas Santos	Brazil	22.23	CR	3
Men's 200 m breaststroke	14 December	Final	Dániel Gyurta	Hungary	2:01.35	CR	3
Men's 200 m medley	14 December	Final	Ryan Lochte	United States	1:49.63	WR	3
Men's 50 m butterfly	15 December	Final	Nicholas Santos	Brazil	22.22	CR	4
Men's 100 m medley	15 December	Semifinal	Ryan Lochte	United States	50.71	WR	4
Men's 200 m butterfly	16 December	Final	Kazuya Kaneda	Japan	1:51.01	CR	5

=== Women ===
Event	Date	Round	Name	Nationality	Time	Record	Day
Women's 50 m breaststroke	12 December	Heats	Rūta Meilutytė	Lithuania	29.56	CR	1
Women's 50 m breaststroke	12 December	Semifinal	Rūta Meilutytė	Lithuania	29.51	CR	1
Women's 200 m butterfly	12 December	Final	Katinka Hosszú	Hungary	2:02.20	CR	1
Women's 400 m medley	12 December	Final	Hannah Miley	(United Kingdom) Great Britain	4:23.14	CR	1
Women's 50 m breaststroke	13 December	Final	Rūta Meilutytė	Lithuania	29.44	CR	2
Women's 100 m medley	14 December	Final	Katinka Hosszú	Hungary	58.49	CR	3
Women's 100 m breaststroke	15 December	Final	Rūta Meilutytė	Lithuania	1:03.52	CR	4
Women's 50 m backstroke	15 December	Semifinal	Zhao Jing	China	26.11	CR	4
Women's 200 m medley	15 December	Final	Ye Shiwen	China	2:04.64	CR	4
Women's 50 m backstroke	16 December	Final	Zhao Jing	China	25.95	CR	5
Women's 200 m breaststroke	16 December	Final	Rikke Møller Pedersen	Denmark	2:16.08	CR	5

- All world records (WR) are subsequently championship records (CR).

^{c} Morozov broke the championship record in the 100 m freestyle as the lead-off leg in the 4 × 100 m freestyle relay.

== Broadcasting rights ==
- Europe – Eurosport
- Finland – Yle
- Hungary – M2; Kossuth Rádió
- Lithuania – LRT televizija
- Turkey – TRT SPOR

== Participating nations ==
161 nations entered the competition. Ecuador, currently suspended by FINA due to government interference, participated under the FINA flag. Venezuela later withdrew.

- Albania (3)
- Algeria (1)
- Andorra (3)
- Angola (4)
- Argentina (8)
- Armenia (3)
- Aruba (3)
- Australia (19)
- Austria (4)
- Azerbaijan (4)
- Bahrain (5)
- Bangladesh (3)
- Barbados (4)
- Belarus (7)
- Belgium (1)
- Benin (2)
- Bolivia (3)
- Bosnia and Herzegovina (2)
- Botswana (6)
- Brazil (22)
- Brunei (4)
- Bulgaria (2)
- Burkina Faso (3)
- Burundi (3)
- Cambodia (3)
- Cameroon (3)
- Canada (13)
- China (36)
- Chinese Taipei (4)
- Chile (2)
- Colombia (3)
- Comoros (3)
- Cook Islands (3)
- Costa Rica (3)
- Ivory Coast (3)
- Croatia (6)
- Cuba (3)
- Cyprus (3)
- Czech Republic (7)
- Denmark (12)
- Djibouti (2)
- Dominican Republic (3)
- Democratic Republic of the Congo (3)
- Ecuador (2)
- El Salvador (3)
- Estonia (6)
- Faroe Islands (2)
- Fiji (3)
- Finland (6)
- France (9)
- Georgia (3)
- Germany (12)
- Ghana (5)
- Gibraltar (5)
- United Kingdom (19)
- Greece (3)
- Grenada (3)
- Guam (4)
- Guatemala (3)
- Guinea (3)
- Guyana (3)
- Honduras (3)
- Hong Kong (3)
- Hungary (15)
- Iceland (3)
- India (9)
- Indonesia (4)
- Iran (2)
- Iraq (3)
- Ireland (1)
- Israel (4)
- Italy (26)
- Jamaica (2)
- Japan (29)
- Jordan (3)
- Kazakhstan (5)
- Kenya (7)
- Kuwait (3)
- Kyrgyzstan (6)
- Laos (3)
- Latvia (3)
- Libya (1)
- Liechtenstein (2)
- Lithuania (6)
- Lesotho (2)
- Luxembourg (3)
- Macau (9)
- Macedonia (3)
- Madagascar (3)
- Mali (3)
- Maldives (3)
- Marshall Islands (3)
- Mauritius (4)
- Mexico (4)
- Malta (7)
- Moldova (3)
- Mongolia (3)
- Mozambique (3)
- Myanmar (3)
- Namibia (4)
- Nepal (3)
- Netherlands (4)
- New Zealand (6)
- Nicaragua (3)
- Niger (2)
- Nigeria (3)
- Northern Mariana Islands (3)
- North Korea (3)
- Norway (2)
- Pakistan (6)
- Palau (3)
- Palestine (3)
- Panama (3)
- Papua New Guinea (4)
- Paraguay (6)
- Peru (10)
- Philippines (2)
- Poland (13)
- Portugal (3)
- Puerto Rico (2)
- Qatar (6)
- Romania (1)
- Russia (28)
- Rwanda (3)
- Saint Lucia (3)
- Saint Vincent and the Grenadines (6)
- Samoa (3)
- Senegal (3)
- Serbia (2)
- Seychelles (4)
- Sierra Leone (5)
- Singapore (9)
- Slovakia (5)
- Slovenia (10)
- South Africa (19)
- South Korea (4)
- Spain (7)
- Sri Lanka (3)
- Sudan (4)
- Syria (3)
- Sweden (11)
- Switzerland (5)
- Tajikistan (3)
- Tanzania (4)
- Thailand (3)
- Togo (3)
- Tonga (1)
- Trinidad and Tobago (3)
- Tunisia (2)
- Turkey (26) (host)
- Turkmenistan (9)
- Uganda (4)
- Ukraine (8)
- United Arab Emirates (3)
- United States (43)
- Uruguay (4)
- Uzbekistan (4)
- Vietnam (3)
- Zambia (3)
- Zimbabwe (2)
