= Kosovo at the 2022 World Aquatics Championships =

- Flag of Kosovo
- FINA code: KOS
- National federation: Kosovo Swimming Federation

in Budapest, Hungary
- Competitors: 2 in 1 sport
- Medals: Gold 0 Silver 0 Bronze 0 Total 0

World Aquatics Championships appearances
- 2015; 2017; 2019; 2022; 2023; 2024

Other related appearances
- Yugoslavia (1973–1991); Serbia and Montenegro (1998–2005); Serbia (2007–2013)

Kosovo competed at the 2022 World Aquatics Championships in Budapest, Hungary from 17 June to 3 July.

== Swimming ==
Kosovo entered two swimmers.

Men

Athlete	Event	Heat		Semifinal		Final	
Athlete	Event	Time	Rank	Time	Rank	Time	Rank
Martin Muja	50 m freestyle	25.45	74	did not advance			
Martin Muja	100 m freestyle	56.57	88	did not advance			

Women

Athlete	Event	Heat		Semifinal		Final	
Athlete	Event	Time	Rank	Time	Rank	Time	Rank
Hana Beiqi	50 m freestyle	28.03	53	did not advance			
Hana Beiqi	100 m freestyle	1:03.68	53	did not advance			
