= FNK =

FNK may refer to:

- Friday Night Kiss, a British house music project
- Kosovo Swimming Federation (Albanian: Federata e Notit të Kosovës)
