= 2012 FINA World Swimming Championships (25 m) – Women's 200 metre breaststroke =

Women's 200m Breaststroke at the 2012 Short Course Worlds
- Dates: 16 December (heats and final)
- Winning time: 2:16.08

Medalists
gold medal	Rikke Møller Pedersen	Denmark
silver medal	Laura Sogar	United States
bronze medal	Kanako Watanabe	Japan

The women's 200 metre breaststroke event at the 11th FINA World Swimming Championships (25m) took place 16 December 2012 at the Sinan Erdem Dome.

== Records ==
Prior to this competition, the existing world and championship records were as follows.

	Name	Nation	Time	Location	Date
World record	Rebecca Soni	United States	2:14.57	Manchester	18 December 2009
Championship record	Rebecca Soni	United States	2:16.39	Dubai	19 December 2010

The following records were established during the competition:

Date	Event	Name	Nation	Time	Record
16 December	Final	Rikke Møller Pedersen	Denmark	2:16.08	CR

== Results ==
=== Heats ===
Rank	Heat	Lane	Name	Time	Notes
1	3	7	Laura Sogar (USA)	2:17.85	Q
2	5	4	Rikke Møller Pedersen (DEN)	2:18.65	Q
3	3	3	Maria Temnikova (RUS)	2:20.96	Q
4	5	1	Andrea Kropp (USA)	2:21.23	Q
5	3	1	Alia Atkinson (JAM)	2:21.69	Q
6	5	6	Tera van Beilen (CAN)	2:21.84	Q
7	5	3	Martha McCabe (CAN)	2:21.91	Q
8	3	6	Kanako Watanabe (JPN)	2:21.99	Q
9	3	5	Hanna Dzerkal (UKR)	2:22.79	
10	4	4	Sally Foster (AUS)	2:23.01	
11	5	5	Vitalina Simonova (RUS)	2:23.22	
12	3	4	Marina García Urzainqui (ESP)	2:23.79	
13	4	6	Jenna Laukkanen (FIN)	2:23.81	
14	1	1	Sun Ye (CHN)	2:24.26	
15	5	2	Dilara Buse Günaydın (TUR)	2:24.35	
16	4	7	Martina Moravčíková (CZE)	2:24.46	
17	4	3	Fumiko Kawanabe (JPN)	2:24.58	
18	1	7	Hrafnhildur Lúthersdóttir (ISL)	2:24.59	
19	4	8	Caroline Ruhnau (GER)	2:24.66	
20	4	1	Hannah Miley (GBR)	2:25.81	
21	4	5	Joline Höstman (SWE)	2:25.92	
22	1	2	Ji Liping (CHN)	2:26.03	
23	4	2	Elin Mårtensson (SWE)	2:27.19	
24	3	8	Samantha Marshall (AUS)	2:28.08	
25	3	2	Back Su-Yeon (KOR)	2:28.36	
26	5	7	Fanny Babou (FRA)	2:28.71	
27	5	0	Alona Ribakova (LAT)	2:28.74	
28	1	5	Sophie Allen (GBR)	2:28.77	
29	5	8	Jessica Pengelly (RSA)	2:28.92	
30	4	0	Julia Sebastian (ARG)	2:29.40	
31	3	0	Beatriz Travalon (BRA)	2:35.11	
32	2	3	Daniela Lindemeier (NAM)	2:35.12	
33	3	9	Dariya Talanova (KGZ)	2:35.20	
34	2	5	Isabel Riquelme (CHI)	2:37.25	
35	2	4	Michaela Millo (MLT)	2:39.85	NR
36	2	1	Barbara Vali-Skelton (PNG)	2:43.75	
37	2	7	Lianna Catherine Swan (PAK)	2:48.24	
38	2	9	Tegan McCarthy (PNG)	2:50.44	
39	2	8	Patricia Cani (ALB)	2:50.69	
40	2	6	Jaywant Arcot Vijaykumar (IND)	2:51.00	
41	1	6	Bonita Imisirovic (BOT)	2:53.92	
42	2	0	Anum Bandey (PAK)	2:54.23	
43	1	3	Domoinanavalona Amboaratiana (MAD)	3:03.15	
44	1	4	Shne Joachim (VIN)	3:05.63	
	4	9	Raminta Dvariškytė (LTU)	DSQ	
	5	9	Samantha Yeo (SIN)	DSQ	
	1	8	Mercedes Toledo (VEN)	DNS	
	2	2	Elodie Poo Cheong (MRI)	DNS	

=== Final ===
The final was held at 19:24.

Rank	Lane	Name	Nationality	Time	Notes
1st place, gold medalist(s)	5	Rikke Møller Pedersen	Denmark	2:16.08	CR, ER
2nd place, silver medalist(s)	4	Laura Sogar	United States	2:16.93	
3rd place, bronze medalist(s)	8	Kanako Watanabe	Japan	2:19.39	
4	3	Maria Temnikova	Russia	2:19.76	
5	6	Andrea Kropp	United States	2:20.08	
6	1	Martha McCabe	Canada	2:20.70	
7	7	Tera van Beilen	Canada	2:21.11	
8	2	Alia Atkinson	Jamaica	2:21.64	
