= 2012 FINA World Swimming Championships (25 m) – Women's 4 × 100 metre medley relay =

Women's Swimming World Championships

Women's 4 × 100 m Medley Relay at the 2012 Short Course Worlds
- Dates: 14 December (heats and final)
- Winning time: 3:49.87

Medalists
gold medal	Denmark; Mie Nielsen, Rikke Møller Pedersen, Jeanette Ottesen, Pernille Blume
silver medal	Australia; Rachel Goh, Sarah Katsoulis, Marieke Guehrer, Angie Bainbridge, Grace Loh*, Samantha Marshall*, Brianna Throssell*, Sally Foster*
bronze medal	United States; Olivia Smoliga, Jessica Hardy, Claire Donahue, Megan Romano, Laura Sogar*, Christine Magnuson*, Lia Neal*; *Indicates the swimmer only competed in the preliminary heats.

The women's 4 × 100 metre medley relay event at the 11th FINA World Swimming Championships (25m) took place 14 December 2012 at the Sinan Erdem Dome.

== Records ==
Prior to this competition, the existing world and championship records were as follows.

	Nation	Swimmers	Time	Location	Date
World record	United States	Natalie Coughlin (55.97); Rebecca Soni (1:02.91); Dana Vollmer (55.36); Missy Franklin (51.32)	3:45.56	Atlanta	16 December 2011
Championship record	China	Zhao Jing (56.52); Zhao Jin (1:04.20); Liu Zige (55.80); Tang Yi (51.77)	3:48.29	Dubai	17 December 2010

No new records were set during this competition.

== Results ==
=== Heats ===
18 teams participated in 2 heats.

Rank	Heat	Lane	Nation	Swimmers	Time	Notes
1	1	1	Denmark	Mie Nielsen (57.59); Rikke Møller Pedersen (1:04.40); Jeanette Ottesen (57.42); Pernille Blume (53.69)	3:53.10	Q, NR
2	2	4	United States	Olivia Smoliga (58.05); Laura Sogar (1:04.43); Christine Magnuson (57.31); Lia Neal (53.38)	3:53.17	Q
3	1	5	Japan	Marie Kamimura (58.83); Kanako Watanabe (1:05.58); Nao Kobayashi (57.03); Miki Uchida (52.97)	3:54.41	Q, NR
4	2	8	Great Britain	Georgia Davies (58.57); Sophie Allen (1:06.04); Jemma Lowe (57.14); Francesca Halsall (52.75)	3:54.50	Q
5	2	9	China	Fu Yuanhui (58.99); Sun Ye (1:05.56); Jiao Liuyang (56.64); Wang Haibin (53.33)	3:54.52	Q
6	1	8	Italy	Arianna Barbieri (57.94); Chiara Boggiatto (1:07.23); Ilaria Bianchi (56.75); Federica Pellegrini (53.74)	3:55.66	Q, NR
7	2	5	Germany	Jenny Mensing (59.50); Caroline Ruhnau (1:06.45); Paulina Schmiedel (58.49); Britta Steffen (52.70)	3:57.14	Q, NR
8	1	4	Australia	Grace Loh (58.79); Samantha Marshall (1:06.08); Brianna Throssell (58.81); Sally Foster (53.68)	3:57.36	Q
9	2	1	Canada	Chantal van Landeghem (59.87); Tera van Beilen (1:06.04); Noemie It-Ting Thomas (57.50); Heather MacLean (54.08)	3:57.49	
10	2	2	Brazil	Fabíola Molina (59.19); Beatriz Travalon (1:07.46); Daynara de Paula (57.69); Larissa Oliveira (53.32)	3:57.66	SA
11	2	3	Russia	Polina Lapshina (59.31); Valentina Artemyeva (1:05.97); Daria Tcvetkova (1:00.01); Veronika Popova (52.75)	3:58.04	
12	2	0	Spain	Duane Da Rocha (58.31); Marina García Urzainqui (1:07.55); Judit Ignacio Sorribes (58.34); Melanie Costa (54.22)	3:58.42	NR
13	1	3	Sweden	Michelle Coleman (59.52); Rebecca Ejdervik (1:07.04); Louise Hansson (58.67); Sandra Hafström (55.21)	4:00.44	
14	1	6	Finland	Hanna-Maria Seppälä (1:01.45); Jenna Laukkanen (1:06.50); Sini Kuutamo (1:00.51); Emilia Pikkarainen (54.71)	4:03.17	NR
15	1	2	South Africa	Jessica Ashley-Cooper (59.62); Jessica Pengelly (1:10.67); Marne Erasmus (59.47); Lehesta Kemp (55.10)	4:04.86	
16	2	7	Macau	Vong Erica Man Wai (1:05.16); Lei On Kei (1:12.26); Kuan Weng I (1:05.39); Tan Chi Yan (1:00.71)	4:23.52	NR
17	1	7	Pakistan	Lianna Catherine Swan (1:09.82); Anum Bandey (1:23.25); Kiran Khan (1:09.02); Mahnoor Maqsood (1:14.70)	4:56.79	
	2	6	Turkey	Hazal Sarıkaya (1:01.72); Dilara Buse Günaydın (1:08.53); İris Rosenberger; Esra Kübra Kaçmaz	DSQ	
	1	0	Venezuela		DNS	

=== Final ===
The final was held at 21:16.

Rank	Lane	Nation	Swimmers	Time	Notes
1st place, gold medalist(s)	4	Denmark	Mie Nielsen (56.73/NR); Rikke Møller Pedersen (1:03.48); Jeanette Ottesen (56.49); Pernille Blume (53.17)	3:49.87	ER
2nd place, silver medalist(s)	8	Australia	Rachel Goh (58.16); Sarah Katsoulis (1:03.89); Marieke Guehrer (56.36); Angie Bainbridge (52.47)	3:50.88	
3rd place, bronze medalist(s)	5	United States	Olivia Smoliga (57.25); Jessica Hardy (1:04.61); Claire Donahue (57.67); Megan Romano (51.90)	3:51.43	
4	6	Great Britain	Georgia Davies (57.45); Sophie Allen (1:05.90); Jemma Lowe (56.51); Francesca Halsall (51.99)	3:51.85	NR
5	2	China	Zhou Yanxin (57.85); Sun Ye (1:05.89); Lu Ying (56.36); Tang Yi (52.43)	3:52.53	
6	3	Japan	Marie Kamimura (59.17); Kanako Watanabe (1:05.15); Nao Kobayashi (57.30); Haruka Ueda (53.11)	3:54.73	
7	7	Italy	Arianna Barbieri (58.25); Chiara Boggiatto (1:07.60); Ilaria Bianchi (56.14); Federica Pellegrini (54.13)	3:56.12	
8	1	Germany	Jenny Mensing (59.90); Caroline Ruhnau (1:06.24); Paulina Schmiedel (58.31); Britta Steffen (52.40)	3:56.85	NR
