= Kosovo at the 2019 World Aquatics Championships =

- Flag of Kosovo
- FINA code: KOS
- National federation: Kosovo Swimming Federation

in Gwangju, South Korea
- Medals: Gold 0 Silver 0 Bronze 0 Total 0

World Aquatics Championships appearances
- 2015; 2017; 2019; 2022; 2023; 2024

Other related appearances
- Yugoslavia (1973–1991); Serbia and Montenegro (1998–2005); Serbia (2007–2013)

Kosovo competed at the 2019 World Aquatics Championships in Gwangju, South Korea from 12 to 28 July.

== Swimming ==
Kosovo entered three swimmers.

Men

Athlete	Event	Heat		Semifinal		Final	
Athlete	Event	Time	Rank	Time	Rank	Time	Rank
Dren Ukimeraj	100 m freestyle	56.33	103	did not advance			
Dren Ukimeraj	200 m freestyle	2:05.29	64	did not advance			

Women

Athlete	Event	Heat		Semifinal		Final	
Athlete	Event	Time	Rank	Time	Rank	Time	Rank
Fjorda Shabani	50 m freestyle	28.34	66	did not advance			
Fjorda Shabani	100 m freestyle	1:02.05	74	did not advance			
Eda Zeqiri	100 m backstroke	1:08.37	54	did not advance			
Eda Zeqiri	200 m backstroke	2:27.11	39	did not advance			
