= 2012 FINA World Swimming Championships (25 m) – Women's 100 metre backstroke =

Women's 100m Backstroke at the 2012 Short Course Worlds
- Dates: 12 December (heats and semifinals); 13 December (final)
- Winning time: 56.64

Medalists
gold medal	Olivia Smoliga	United States
silver medal	Mie Nielsen	Denmark
bronze medal	Simona Baumrtová	Czech Republic

The women's 100 metre backstroke event at the 11th FINA World Swimming Championships (25m) took place 12 – 13 December 2012 at the Sinan Erdem Dome.

== Records ==
Prior to this competition, the existing world and championship records were as follows.

	Name	Nation	Time	Location	Date
World record	Shiho Sakai	Japan	55.23	Berlin	15 November 2009
Championship record	Natalie Coughlin	United States	56.08	Dubai	16 December 2010

No new records were set during this competition.

== Results ==
=== Heats ===
67 swimmers participated in 7 heats.

Rank	Heat	Lane	Name	Time	Notes
1	6	5	Simona Baumrtová (CZE)	57.65	Q
2	7	4	Daryna Zevina (UKR)	57.66	Q
3	5	8	Olivia Smoliga (USA)	57.75	Q
4	7	3	Mie Nielsen (DEN)	57.83	Q
5	5	5	Grace Loh (AUS)	57.89	Q
6	5	3	Georgia Davies (GBR)	57.94	Q
7	7	2	Arianna Barbieri (ITA)	58.02	Q
8	7	5	Kira Toussaint (NED)	58.23	Q
9	5	4	Rachel Goh (AUS)	58.35	Q
10	6	3	Duane Da Rocha (ESP)	58.40	Q
11	5	9	Megan Romano (USA)	58.45	Q
12	6	4	Elizabeth Simmonds (GBR)	58.48	Q
13	7	6	Zhou Yanxin (CHN)	58.73	Q
14	5	1	Marie Kamimura (JPN)	58.75	Q
15	6	6	Michelle Coleman (SWE)	58.83	Q
16	5	6	Sharon van Rouwendaal (NED)	58.86	Q
17	5	7	Fernanda González (MEX)	58.94	NR
18	6	2	Anja Čarman (SLO)	59.02	
19	4	4	Carolina Colorado Henao (COL)	59.19	NR
20	5	0	Jessica Ashley-Cooper (RSA)	59.35	
21	6	8	Melissa Ingram (NZL)	59.36	
22	6	7	Fabíola Molina (BRA)	59.37	
23	7	9	Karin Prinsloo (RSA)	59.68	
24	4	3	Evelyn Verrasztó (HUN)	59.69	
25	7	1	Jenny Mensing (GER)	59.76	
26	7	0	Alicja Tchórz (POL)	59.84	
27	6	1	Polina Lapshina (RUS)	1:00.10	
28	6	0	Etiene Medeiros (BRA)	1:00.88	
29	7	8	Noriko Inada (JPN)	1:00.93	
30	6	9	Fu Yuanhui (CHN)	1:01.08	
30	7	7	Chantal van Landeghem (CAN)	1:01.08	
32	4	6	Hanna-Maria Seppälä (FIN)	1:01.14	
33	1	8	Yekaterina Rudenko (KAZ)	1:01.16	
34	4	5	Ida Lindborg (SWE)	1:01.23	
35	4	1	Sarah Rolko (LUX)	1:01.37	
36	4	0	Birita Debes (FRO)	1:01.68	
37	4	2	Hazal Sarıkaya (TUR)	1:01.86	
38	4	7	Halime Zulal Zeren (TUR)	1:02.40	
39	4	8	Kätlin Sepp (EST)	1:02.97	
40	3	5	Lynette Ng (SIN)	1:03.54	NR
41	5	2	Nguyễn Thị Ánh Viên (VIE)	1:03.63	
42	3	7	Araya Wongvat (THA)	1:03.78	
43	3	2	Inés Remersaro (URU)	1:04.32	
44	3	9	Caroline Pickering Puamau (FIJ)	1:04.37	
45	3	6	Vong Erica Man Wai (MAC)	1:04.69	
46	3	4	Agata Magner (POL)	1:04.94	
47	4	9	Tatiana Perstniova (MDA)	1:05.07	
48	2	3	Mariangel Hidalgo (CRC)	1:05.43	
49	2	5	Lanoe Talisa Erwan (KEN)	1:05.64	NR
50	3	1	Anahit Barseghyan (ARM)	1:05.71	NR
51	3	0	Mónica Ramírez (AND)	1:05.81	
52	3	3	Yessy Yosaputra (INA)	1:05.84	
53	2	4	Kuan Weng I (MAC)	1:06.71	
54	3	8	Kimiko Shihara Raheem (SRI)	1:07.25	
55	2	6	Naomi Ruele (BOT)	1:07.59	
56	2	2	Field Anita Zahra (KEN)	1:08.32	
57	2	8	Nur Hamizah Ahmad (BRU)	1:09.68	NR
58	2	7	Fabiola Espinoza (NCA)	1:10.88	
59	2	1	Lianna Catherine Swan (PAK)	1:11.53	
60	2	0	Monica Saili (SAM)	1:11.88	
61	1	7	K. Zin Win (MYA)	1:12.01	
62	2	9	Tegan McCarthy (PNG)	1:12.61	
63	1	4	Victoria Chentsova (NMI)	1:14.14	
64	1	2	Domoinanavalona Amboaratiana (MAD)	1:14.39	
65	1	6	Felicity Passon (SEY)	1:15.64	
66	1	3	Danielle Atoigue (GUM)	1:19.86	
67	1	5	Ann Marie Hepler (MHL)	1:21.89	
	1	0	Erika Torrellas (VEN)	DNS	
	1	1	Andreina Pinto (VEN)	DNS	

=== Semifinals ===
16 swimmers participated in 2 heats.

Rank	Heat	Lane	Name	Nationality	Time	Notes
1	1	5	Mie Nielsen	Denmark	57.15	Q, NR
2	2	2	Rachel Goh	Australia	57.39	Q
3	1	3	Georgia Davies	Great Britain	57.41	Q
4	2	4	Simona Baumrtová	Czech Republic	57.62	Q
4	2	3	Grace Loh	Australia	57.62	Q
6	1	4	Daryna Zevina	Ukraine	57.66	Q
7	2	5	Olivia Smoliga	United States	57.74	Q
8	1	2	Duane Da Rocha	Spain	58.15	Q
9	2	1	Zhou Yanxin	China	58.21	
10	1	7	Elizabeth Simmonds	Great Britain	58.34	
11	1	6	Kira Toussaint	Netherlands	58.36	
12	2	7	Megan Romano	United States	58.46	
13	2	6	Arianna Barbieri	Italy	58.50	
14	2	8	Michelle Coleman	Sweden	58.65	
15	1	8	Sharon van Rouwendaal	Netherlands	58.89	
16	1	1	Marie Kamimura	Japan	59.23	

=== Final ===
The final was held at 19:59.

Rank	Lane	Name	Nationality	Time	Notes
1st place, gold medalist(s)	1	Olivia Smoliga	United States	56.64	
2nd place, silver medalist(s)	4	Mie Nielsen	Denmark	57.07	NR
3rd place, bronze medalist(s)	6	Simona Baumrtová	Czech Republic	57.18	NR
4	5	Rachel Goh	Australia	57.31	
5	3	Georgia Davies	Great Britain	57.32	
6	2	Grace Loh	Australia	57.34	
7	7	Daryna Zevina	Ukraine	57.67	
8	8	Duane Da Rocha	Spain	58.14	
