= Swimming at the 2016 Summer Olympics – Women's 100 metre backstroke =

Women's 100 metre backstroke at the Games of the XXXI Olympiad
- Venue: Olympic Aquatics Stadium
- Dates: 7 August 2016 (heats & semifinals); 8 August 2016 (final)
- Competitors: 34 from 28 nations
- Winning time: 58.45

Medalists
1st place, gold medalist(s)		Katinka Hosszú	Hungary
2nd place, silver medalist(s)		Kathleen Baker	United States
3rd place, bronze medalist(s)		Kylie Masse	Canada
3rd place, bronze medalist(s)		Fu Yuanhui	China

The women's 100 metre backstroke event at the 2016 Summer Olympics took place on 7–8 August at the Olympic Aquatics Stadium.

== Summary ==
After a world-record breaking victory in the 400 m individual medley two days earlier, Hungary's Katinka Hosszú touched out the U.S. swimmer Kathleen Baker at the home stretch to capture the sprint backstroke crown, and her second gold medal at these Games. Approaching the 50-metre lap, Baker pulled herself ahead of the field with a marginal lead, but Hosszú passed the American at the final 25-metre stretch to touch the wall first with a Hungarian record of 58.45. Falling three tenths of a second short of the Olympic title, Baker picked up the silver instead at 58.75. Meanwhile, Canada's Kylie Masse and China's Fu Yuanhui tied for the bronze in a matching 58.76, breaking their national records respectively.

Trailing Hosszú by a 0.35-second margin, Denmark's Mie Nielsen finished off the podium with a fifth-place time in 58.80, while Baker's teammate Olivia Smoliga moved up to sixth with a 58.95. London 2012 silver medalist and reigning World champion Emily Seebohm faded to seventh in 59.19, with fellow Australian swimmer Madison Wilson (59.23) finishing behind her by 0.04 of a second to round out the championship field.

The medals for the competition were presented by Frankie Fredericks, Namibia, IOC member, and the gifts were presented by Ben Ekumbo, Bureau Member of the FINA.

== Records ==
Prior to this competition, the existing world and Olympic records were as follows.

World record	Gemma Spofforth (GBR)	58.12	Rome, Italy	28 July 2009
Olympic record	Emily Seebohm (AUS)	58.23	London, United Kingdom	29 July 2012

== Competition format ==
The competition consisted of three rounds: heats, semifinals, and a final. The swimmers with the best 16 times in the heats advanced to the semifinals. The swimmers with the best 8 times in the semifinals advanced to the final. Swim-offs were used as necessary to break ties for advancement to the next round.

== Results ==
=== Heats ===
Rank	Heat	Lane	Name	Nationality	Time	Notes
1	4	3	Kathleen Baker	United States	58.84	Q
2	5	4	Emily Seebohm	Australia	58.99	Q
3	5	3	Kylie Masse	Canada	59.07	Q
4	4	4	Mie Nielsen	Denmark	59.13	Q
4	5	5	Katinka Hosszú	Hungary	59.13	Q
6	3	5	Olivia Smoliga	United States	59.60	Q
7	4	6	Georgia Davies	Great Britain	59.86	Q
8	3	4	Madison Wilson	Australia	59.92	Q
9	4	5	Fu Yuanhui	China	1:00.02	Q
10	3	3	Anastasia Fesikova	Russia	1:00.04	Q
11	3	2	Kirsty Coventry	Zimbabwe	1:00.13	Q
12	5	2	Dominique Bouchard	Canada	1:00.18	Q
13	4	8	Matea Samardžić	Croatia	1:00.46	Q
14	4	2	Wang Xueer	China	1:00.59	Q
15	4	1	Duane da Rocha	Spain	1:00.87	Q
16	3	7	Eygló Ósk Gústafsdóttir	Iceland	1:00.89	Q
17	3	8	Simona Baumrtová	Czech Republic	1:01.08	
18	5	1	Kira Toussaint	Netherlands	1:01.17	
19	2	5	Claudia Lau	Hong Kong	1:01.27	
20	5	8	Yekaterina Rudenko	Kazakhstan	1:01.28	
21	2	4	Alicja Tchórz	Poland	1:01.31	
22	4	7	Katarína Listopadová	Slovakia	1:01.43	
23	3	6	Daria Ustinova	Russia	1:01.45	
24	3	1	Mimosa Jallow	Finland	1:01.58	
25	5	6	Etiene Medeiros	Brazil	1:01.70	
26	5	7	Natsumi Sakai	Japan	1:01.74	
27	2	3	Alexus Laird	Seychelles	1:03.33	
28	2	2	Kimiko Raheem	Sri Lanka	1:04.21	
29	2	6	Lara Butler	Cayman Islands	1:04.98	NR
30	2	1	Caylee Watson	Virgin Islands	1:07.19	NR
31	1	4	Gaurika Singh	Nepal	1:08.45	
32	1	5	Evelina Afoa	Samoa	1:08.74	
33	2	7	Talisa Lanoe	Kenya	1:10.02	
34	1	3	Rita Zeqiri	Kosovo	1:12.31	NR

=== Semifinals ===
==== Semifinal 1 ====
Rank	Lane	Name	Nationality	Time	Notes
1	6	Madison Wilson	Australia	59.03	Q
2	5	Mie Nielsen	Denmark	59.18	Q
3	4	Emily Seebohm	Australia	59.32	Q
4	3	Olivia Smoliga	United States	59.35	Q
5	2	Anastasia Fesikova	Russia	59.68	
6	7	Dominique Bouchard	Canada	1:00.54	
7	8	Eygló Ósk Gústafsdóttir	Iceland	1:00.65	
8	1	Wang Xueer	China	1:01.44	

==== Semifinal 2 ====
Rank	Lane	Name	Nationality	Time	Notes
1	4	Kathleen Baker	United States	58.84	Q
2	3	Katinka Hosszú	Hungary	58.94	Q
3	2	Fu Yuanhui	China	58.95	Q
4	5	Kylie Masse	Canada	59.06	Q, NR
5	6	Georgia Davies	Great Britain	59.85	
6	7	Kirsty Coventry	Zimbabwe	1:00.26	
7	1	Matea Samardžić	Croatia	1:00.60	
8	8	Duane da Rocha	Spain	1:00.85	

=== Final ===
Rank	Lane	Name	Nationality	Time	Notes
1st place, gold medalist(s)	5	Katinka Hosszú	Hungary	58.45	NR
2nd place, silver medalist(s)	4	Kathleen Baker	United States	58.75	
3rd place, bronze medalist(s)	2	Kylie Masse	Canada	58.76	NR
3rd place, bronze medalist(s)	3	Fu Yuanhui	China	58.76	NR
5	7	Mie Nielsen	Denmark	58.80	
6	8	Olivia Smoliga	United States	58.95	
7	1	Emily Seebohm	Australia	59.19	
8	6	Madison Wilson	Australia	59.23	
