= Kosovo at the 2023 World Aquatics Championships =

- Flag of Kosovo
- FINA code: KOS
- National federation: Kosovo Aquatic Sports Federation

in Fukuoka, Japan
- Competitors: 2 in 1 sport
- Medals: Gold 0 Silver 0 Bronze 0 Total 0

World Aquatics Championships appearances
- 2015; 2017; 2019; 2022; 2023; 2024

Other related appearances
- Yugoslavia (1973–1991); Serbia and Montenegro (1998–2005); Serbia (2007–2013)

Kosovo is set to compete at the 2023 World Aquatics Championships in Fukuoka, Japan from 14 to 30 July.

== Swimming ==
Kosovo entered 2 swimmers.

Men

Athlete	Event	Heat		Semifinal		Final	
Athlete	Event	Time	Rank	Time	Rank	Time	Rank
Mal Gashi	200 metre freestyle	1:59.20	66	Did not advance			
Mal Gashi	400 metre freestyle	4:07.65	44	—		Did not advance	

Women

Athlete	Event	Heat		Semifinal		Final	
Athlete	Event	Time	Rank	Time	Rank	Time	Rank
Eda Zeqiri	50 metre backstroke	30.96	45	Did not advance			
Eda Zeqiri	100 metre backstroke	1:07.17	52	Did not advance			
