= 2012 FINA World Swimming Championships (25 m) – Women's 4 × 100 metre freestyle relay =

Women's 4 × 100 m Freestyle Relay at the 2012 Short Course Worlds
- Dates: 15 December (heats and final)
- Winning time: 3:31.01

Medalists
gold medal	United States; Megan Romano, Jessica Hardy, Lia Neal, Allison Schmitt, Shannon Vreeland*, Olivia Smoliga*
silver medal	Australia; Angie Bainbridge, Marieke Guehrer, Brianna Throssell, Sally Foster
bronze medal	Denmark; Mie Nielsen, Pernille Blume, Kelly Rasmussen, Jeanette Ottesen

The women's 4 × 100 metre freestyle relay event at the 11th FINA World Swimming Championships (25m) took place 15 December 2012 at the Sinan Erdem Dome.

== Records ==
Prior to this competition, the existing world and championship records were as follows.

	Nation	Swimmers	Time	Location	Date
World record	Netherlands	Hinkelien Schreuder (52.88); Inge Dekker (52.24); Ranomi Kromowidjojo (52.12); Marleen Veldhuis (50.98)	3:28.22	Amsterdam	19 December 2008
Championship record	Netherlands	Femke Heemskerk (52.33); Inge Dekker (52.47); Hinkelien Schreuder (52.32); Ranomi Kromowidjojo (51.42)	3:28.54	Dubai	18 December 2010

No new records were set during this competition.

== Results ==
=== Heats ===
Rank	Heat	Lane	Nation	Swimmers	Time	Notes
1	2	4	United States	Lia Neal (53.70); Allison Schmitt (53.16); Shannon Vreeland (53.34); Olivia Smoliga (54.07)	3:34.27	Q
2	1	4	Australia	Sally Foster (53.62); Angie Bainbridge (53.24); Brianna Throssell (54.79); Marieke Guehrer (53.61)|	3:35.26	Q
3	1	1	Denmark	Mie Nielsen (53.66); Pernille Blume (54.12); Kelly Rasmussen (54.84); Jeanette Ottesen (53.36)	3:35.98	Q
4	2	3	Brazil	Larissa Oliveira (53.90); Alessandra Marchioro (53.78); Tatiana Lemos (54.21); Flávia Cazziolato (54.47)	3:36.36	Q
5	2	1	China	Qiu Yuhan (54.22); Guo Junjun (53.79); Liu Xinyi (54.94); Pang Jiaying (54.48)	3:37.43	Q
6	1	5	Russia	Veronika Popova (53.54); Elena Sokolova (54.19); Vitalina Simonova (54.47); Polina Lapshina (55.42)	3:37.62	Q
7	2	8	Great Britain	Francesca Halsall (53.91); Rebecca Turner (54.52); Ellie Faulkner (55.05); Elizabeth Simmonds (54.72)	3:38.20	Q
8	2	5	Japan	Haruka Ueda (53.83); Miki Uchida (54.74); Kanako Watanabe (55.58); Nao Kobayashi (54.60)	3:38.75	Q
9	1	7	Canada	Chantal van Landeghem (54.83); Heather MacLean (54.51); Noemie It-Ting Thomas (56.06); Katerine Savard (55.39)	3:40.79	
10	1	6	South Africa	Trudi Maree (54.97); Lehesta Kemp (54.70); Megan Stephens (56.45); Vanessa Mohr (55.68)	3:41.80	AF
11	1	3	Turkey	Esra Kübra Kaçmaz (56.50); Ilknur Nihan Cakici (57.10); Nilüfer Kuru (58.37); Burcu Dolunay (55.80)	3:47.77	NR
12	2	6	Singapore	Mylene Ong (56.16); Amanda Lim (57.72); Lynette Ng (58.27); Samantha Yeo (58.42)	3:50.57	
13	2	2	Macau	Lei On Kei (58.21); Vong Erica Man Wai (58.60); Kuan Weng I (59.21); Tan Chi Yan (58.87)	3:54.89	NR
14	1	2	Peru	Jessica Cattaneo (59.52); Andrea Cedrón (59.61); Daniela Miyahara (59.93); Oriele Espinoza (1:00.26)	3:59.32	
15	2	7	Pakistan	Kiran Khan (1:03.74); Anum Bandey (1:07.89); Mahnoor Maqsood (1:11.52); Lianna Catherine Swan (1:02.62)	4:25.77	
	1	8	Venezuela		DNS	

=== Final ===
The final was held at 20:41.

Rank	Lane	Nation	Swimmers	Time	Notes
1st place, gold medalist(s)	4	United States	Megan Romano (52.86); Jessica Hardy (53.32); Lia Neal (52.44); Allison Schmitt (52.39)	3:31.01	
2nd place, silver medalist(s)	5	Australia	Angie Bainbridge (53.04); Marieke Guehrer (52.32); Brianna Throssell (54.19); Sally Foster (53.35)	3:32.90	
3rd place, bronze medalist(s)	3	Denmark	Mie Nielsen (53.07); Pernille Blume (53.61); Kelly Rasmussen (54.59); Jeanette Ottesen (52.24)	3:33.51	NR
4	2	China	Qiu Yuhan (54.32); Guo Junjun (54.52); Wang Haibing (53.44); Chen Xinyi (53.94)	3:36.22	
5	7	Russia	Veronika Popova (53.60); Elena Sokolova (54.08); Daria Belyakina (54.41); Vitalina Simonova (54.63)	3:36.72	
6	6	Brazil	Larissa Oliveira (53.90); Alessandra Marchioro (54.34); Flávia Cazziolato (54.55); Tatiana Lemos (54.26)	3:37.05	
7	8	Japan	Haruka Ueda (53.63); Miki Uchida (53.93); Asami Chida (55.44); Nao Kobayashi (55.44)	3:37.91	
8	1	Great Britain	Rebecca Turner (54.37); Elizabeth Simmonds (55.00); Ellie Faulkner (54.55); Francesca Halsall (54.31)	3:38.23	
