= Angie Bainbridge =

Australian swimmer (born 1989)

Personal information
- Full name: Angie Lee Bainbridge
- National team: Australia
- Born: 16 October 1989 (age 36) Newcastle, New South Wales
- Height: 1.81 m (5 ft 11 in)
- Weight: 67 kg (148 lb)

Sport
- Sport: Swimming
- Strokes: Freestyle
- Club: Hunter
Medal record
Women's swimming
Representing Australia
Olympic Games
Gold medal – first place	2008 Beijing	4×200 m freestyle
Silver medal – second place	2012 London	4×200 m freestyle
World Championships (LC)
Silver medal – second place	2011 Shanghai	4×200 m freestyle
World Championships (SC)
Silver medal – second place	2008 Manchester	4×100 m freestyle
Silver medal – second place	2008 Manchester	4×100 m medley
Silver medal – second place	2012 Istanbul	4×100 m freestyle
Silver medal – second place	2012 Istanbul	4×100 m medley
Bronze medal – third place	2008 Manchester	4×200 m freestyle

Angie Lee Bainbridge, OAM (born 16 October 1989) is an Australian freestyle swimmer who specialises in the 200-metre event.

At the 2008 Australian Swimming Championships she qualified for the 2008 Summer Olympics in Beijing as a member of the 4×100-metre and 4×200-metre freestyle relay squads by coming sixth and third in the respective individual events.

She was not used as the Australians won bronze in the shorter race. She then swam the preliminary heats of the longer relay, and collected gold when the first-choice quartet won the final in a world record time.

In 2009, she received the Medal of the Order of Australia "For service to sport as a gold medallist at the Beijing 2008 Olympic Games".

She was part of the Australian 4 × 200 m freestyle team at the 2012 Summer Olympics, again swimming in the heats.

She was an Australian Institute of Sport scholarship holder.

== See also ==
- List of Olympic medalists in swimming (women)
