= Kosovo at the 2024 World Aquatics Championships =

- Flag of Kosovo
- FINA code: KOS
- National federation: Kosovo Aquatic Sports Federation

in Doha, Qatar
- Competitors: 2 in 1 sport

World Aquatics Championships appearances
- 2015; 2017; 2019; 2022; 2023; 2024

Other related appearances
- Yugoslavia (1973–1991); Serbia and Montenegro (1998–2005); Serbia (2007–2013)

Kosovo competed at the 2024 World Aquatics Championships in Doha, Qatar from 2 to 18 February.

== Athletes by discipline ==
Sport	Men	Women	Total
Swimming	1	1	2
Total	1	1	2

== Swimming ==
Men

Athlete	Event	Heat		Semifinal		Final	
Athlete	Event	Time	Rank	Time	Rank	Time	Rank
Mal Gashi	400 metre freestyle	4:08.51	48	—		Did not advance	
Mal Gashi	800 metre freestyle	8:35.97	41	—		Did not advance	

Women

Athlete	Event	Heat		Semifinal		Final	
Athlete	Event	Time	Rank	Time	Rank	Time	Rank
Eda Zeqiri	50 metre backstroke	30.69	41	Did not advance			
Eda Zeqiri	100 metre backstroke	1:06.64	46	Did not advance			
