= Eda Zeqiri =

Kosovan swimmer (born 2004)

Personal information
- Nationality: Kosovo
- Born: August 7, 2004 (age 21)
- Height: 176 cm (5 ft 9 in)

Sport
- Sport: Swimming
- Strokes: Backstroke, Freestyle

Eda Zeqiri (born 7 August 2004), is a Kosovan swimmer who competed in the women's 400m freestyle at the 2020 Summer Olympics.

== Early life ==
Eda Zeqiri was born on 7 August 2004. Her older sister, Rita Zeqiri, is also a swimmer who competed at the 2016 Summer Olympics. Her father is the former president of the Kosovo Swimming Federation.

== Career ==
Zeqiri competed at the 2018 Mediterranean Games, finishing 15th in the 50 metre backstroke and 11th in the 100 metre backstroke. She then competed at the 2018 European Championships and was the youngest swimmer there, turning 14 years old during the competition. She finished 47th in the 100 metre backstroke, and she was slated to compete in the 100 metre freestyle but did not start. At the 2018 World Short-Course Championships, she finished 51st in the 100 metre backstroke and 38th in the 50 metre backstroke.

Zeqiri represented Kosovo at the 2019 World Aquatics Championships and finished 54th in the 100 metre backstroke and 39th in the 200 metre backstroke. She also competed at the 2020 European Championships, held in 2021 due to the COVID-19 pandemic. She finished 61st in the 50 metre freestyle, 52nd in the 50 metre backstroke, 67th in the 100 metre freestyle, 65th in the 200 metre freestyle, and 43rd in the 400 metre freestyle. Additionally, she competed in the women's and mixed 4 × 100 metre freestyle relay teams that both finished 16th.

Zeqiri was one of 11 athletes to represent Kosovo at the 2020 Summer Olympics. She was awarded a Universality Place in the 400 metres freestyle event. She finished 24th out of the 26 competitors with a time of 4:38.02.

Zeqiri was one of two athletes that represented Kosovo at the 2023 World Aquatics Championships. She competed in the 50 metre and 100 metre backstroke events, finishing 45th and 52nd, respectively. She was then one of two athletes to represent Kosovo at the 2024 World Aquatics Championships. She competed in the 100 metre backstroke and finished 46th in the heats with a time of 1:06.64. She then competed in the 50 metre backstroke and finished 41st in the heats with a time of 30.69, an improvement on her time from the previous World Championships.
