= Laura Sogar =

American swimmer (born 1991)

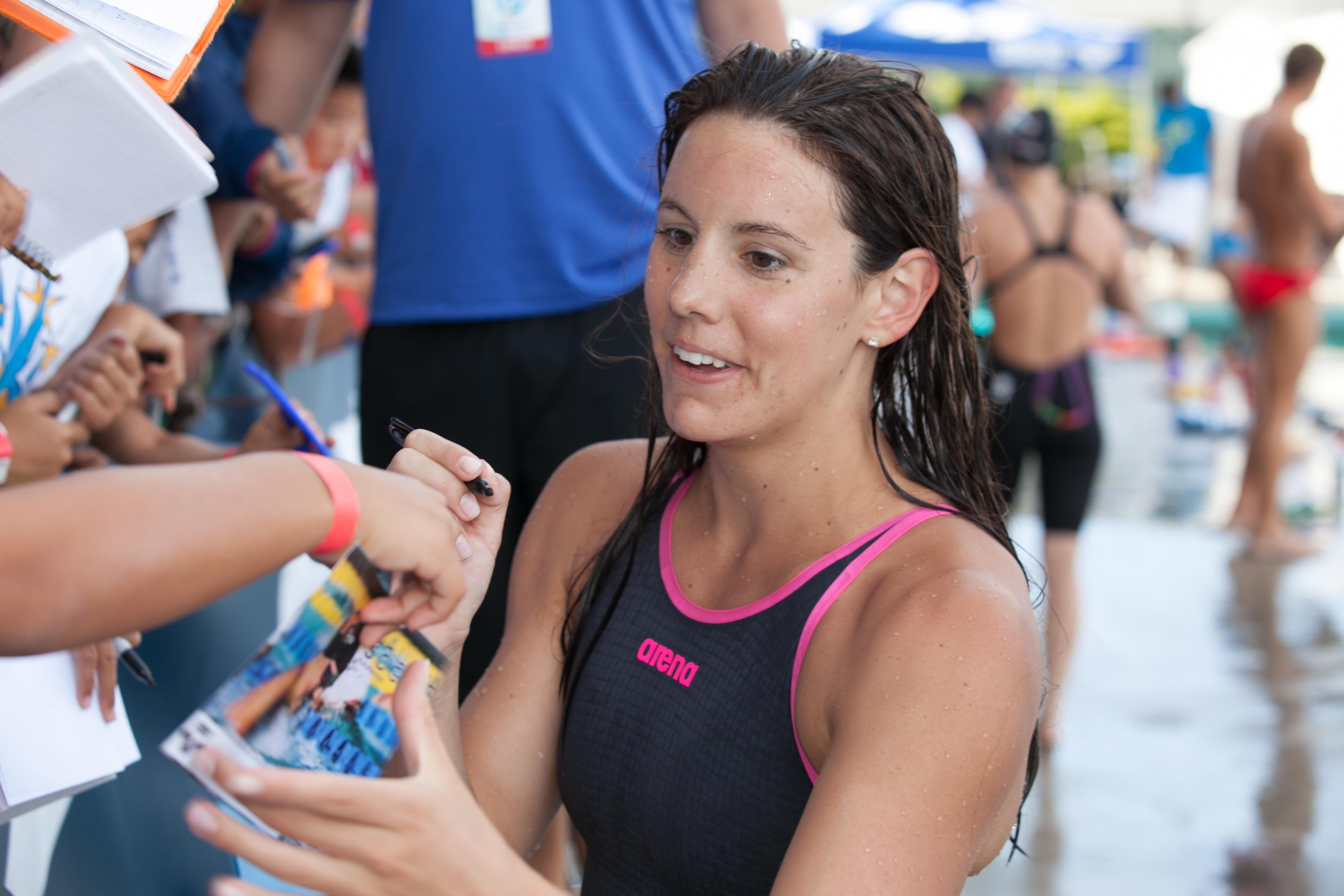
- Sogar in 2017 signing autographs

Personal information
- National team: United States
- Born: April 27, 1991 (age 35) Dallas, Texas, U.S.
- Height: 1.78 m (5 ft 10 in)

Sport
- Sport: Swimming
- Strokes: Breaststroke
- Club: University of Texas
Medal record
Representing United States
Women's swimming
FINA Youth World Swimming Championships
Gold medal – first place	2008 Monterrey	4 × 100 m relay medley
Silver medal – second place	2008 Monterrey	50m breaststroke
Bronze medal – third place	2008 Monterrey	200m breaststroke
FINA World Swimming Championships (25 m)
Silver medal – second place	2012 Istanbul	200m breaststroke
Bronze medal – third place	2012 Istanbul	4 × 100 m medley relay
Summer Universiade
Silver medal – second place	2013 Kazan	200m breaststroke
Bronze medal – third place	2013 Kazan	4 × 100 metre medley relay

Laura Sogar (born April 27, 1991) is an American comedian and former competitive swimmer. After a collegiate career at the University of Texas, she won two medals representing the United States at the 2012 World Swimming Championships. After retiring from professional swimming in 2016, Sogar began a career in improv and stand-up comedy.

== Early life ==
Sogar was born in Dallas and grew up in Exeter, Rhode Island. She attended The Prout School in Wakefield where she was a five-time all-state swimmer and was named Rhode Island Female Swimmer of the Year.

== College career ==
In college, Sogar competed for the University of Texas Longhorns. She was named Big 12 Swimmer of the Year in 2012. Sogar won an NCAA title in 2013 in the women's 200 breaststroke.

== International career ==
Sogar competed at the 2008 Youth World Swimming Championships, winning three medals including a gold in the girls 4×100 m relay medley.

Sogar first represented the United States in senior level competitions at the 25m 2012 World Swimming Championships in Istanbul. She won silver in the women's 200m breaststroke and a bronze medal in the women's 4 × 100 m relay medley event.

Sogar completed twice at the US Olympic Swimming Trials. In 2008, she finished eighth in the 200m breaststroke and 13th in the 100m breaststroke event. At the 2012 Trials, Sogar finished fourth in the 200m breaststroke and ninth in the 100m breaststroke.

== Post-swimming career ==
Since 2016, Sogar has been an improviser and stand-up comedian. In 2025, she married comedian Matthew Broussard.
