= Olivia Smoliga =

American swimmer (born 1994)

- Smoliga at the 2017 World Aquatics Championships

Personal information
- National team: United States
- Born: October 12, 1994 (age 32) Glenview, Illinois, U.S.
- Height: 6 ft 2 in (188 cm)
- Weight: 163 lb (74 kg)

Sport
- Sport: Swimming
- Strokes: Backstroke, freestyle
- Club: Cali Condors; Athens Bulldog Swim Club
- College team: University of Georgia
- Coach: Jack Bauerle
Medal record
Women's swimming
Representing United States
Olympic Games
Gold medal – first place	2016 Rio de Janeiro	4×100 m medley
Bronze medal – third place	2020 Tokyo	4×100 m freestyle
World Championships (LC)
Gold medal – first place	2017 Budapest	4×100 m freestyle
Gold medal – first place	2017 Budapest	4×100 m medley
Gold medal – first place	2019 Gwangju	50 m backstroke
Gold medal – first place	2019 Gwangju	4×100 m medley
Silver medal – second place	2023 Fukuoka	4×100 m freestyle
Silver medal – second place	2023 Fukuoka	4×100 m mixed freestyle
Bronze medal – third place	2019 Gwangju	100 m backstroke
World Championships (SC)
Gold medal – first place	2012 Istanbul	100 m backstroke
Gold medal – first place	2012 Istanbul	4×100 m freestyle
Gold medal – first place	2018 Hangzhou	50 m backstroke
Gold medal – first place	2018 Hangzhou	100 m backstroke
Gold medal – first place	2018 Hangzhou	4×50 m freestyle
Gold medal – first place	2018 Hangzhou	4×100 m freestyle
Gold medal – first place	2018 Hangzhou	4×50 m medley
Gold medal – first place	2018 Hangzhou	4×100 m medley
Gold medal – first place	2018 Hangzhou	4×50 m mixed freestyle
Gold medal – first place	2018 Hangzhou	4×50 m mixed medley
Silver medal – second place	2012 Istanbul	50 m backstroke
Bronze medal – third place	2012 Istanbul	4×100 m medley
Pan American Games
Silver medal – second place	2015 Toronto	100 m backstroke
Junior Pan Pacific Championships
Gold medal – first place	2012 Honolulu	100 m backstroke
Gold medal – first place	2012 Honolulu	4×100 m freestyle
Gold medal – first place	2012 Honolulu	4×100 m medley
Silver medal – second place	2012 Honolulu	50 m freestyle

Olivia Smoliga (born October 12, 1994) is a two-time Olympian and American competitive swimmer who specializes in backstroke and freestyle events. She won a record eight gold medals at the 2018 World Championships, becoming the first swimmer, male or female, to win eight or more gold medals in a single FINA World Swimming Championships or FINA World Aquatics Championships. She is the current Guinness World Record holder for "most gold medals won at a single FINA World Championships" by an individual swimmer. At the 2016 Summer Olympics held in Rio de Janeiro, she won a gold medal for swimming the backstroke leg in the preliminary heat of the 4x100-meter medley relay.

She swam for the Cali Condors as part of the International Swimming League.

== Early life and education ==
Her parents, Tomasz and Elżbieta Smoliga, emigrated from Poland to the United States in 1991. She has a younger brother, Matt, who plays hockey. After graduating from Glenbrook South High School in 2013, Smoliga attended the University of Georgia on athletic scholarship, where she swam for coach Jack Bauerle's Georgia Bulldogs swimming and diving team for four years.

== Swimming career ==
=== 2012: Breakthrough ===
2012 World Short Course Championships
Gold medal – first place	100 m backstroke	56.64
Gold medal – first place	4x100 m freestyle	3:31.01
Silver medal – second place	50 m backstroke	26.13 (NR)
Bronze medal – third place	4x100 m medley	3:49.87

At the 2012 United States Olympic Trials, the qualifying meet for the 2012 Olympics, Smoliga missed the Olympic team by finishing fourth in the 100-meter backstroke (1:00.46) and twenty-third in the 50-meter freestyle (25.66). During the semifinals, Smoliga swam a personal best of 59.82 breaking the long course one-minute barrier for the first time.

At the Illinois State High School Championships in November 2012, Smoliga broke the national high school records in both the 100-yard backstroke (51.43) and 50-yard freestyle (21.99).

At the 2012 FINA Short Course World Championships in Istanbul, her first major international competition, Smoliga won a total of four medals: two gold, one silver, and one bronze. In the 100-meter backstroke final, Smoliga surprised the field by winning gold in a time of 56.64 swimming from lane 1. In the last 50-meters, Smoliga had the fastest split in the field with a time of 29.74. Smoliga also earned gold in the 4×100-meter freestyle relay, silver in the 50-meter backstroke (in which she set the American record), and bronze in the 4×100-meter medley relay.

=== 2013–2015: NCAA Championship, Pan American Games ===
Smoliga has won the 2013–14 NCAA Women's Division I Swimming and Diving Championships with the Georgia Bulldogs, with a gold at the 50yd freestyle, and bronze at the 400yd medley relay.

She was struck with mononucleosis prior to the 2014 Phillips 66 National Championships, leading her to bad results in both that championship and the 2015 NCAA tournament. However, being the fifth best time at the 100m backstroke, she retained her spot at the national swimming team, and was qualified for the 2015 Pan American Games. She won the silver at the 100m backstroke with a 1:00.06, her third fastest time ever.

=== 2016: Rio Summer Olympics ===
At the 2016 United States Olympic Trials, Smoliga qualified for the Olympics by winning the 100m backstroke with a time of 59.02. In doing so, she beat out the previous two Olympic gold medallists in the 100m backstroke, Missy Franklin and Natalie Coughlin.

In Rio, Smoliga finished sixth in the individual 100m backstroke with a time of 58.95, a personal best. Her American teammate Kathleen Baker won a silver medal with a time of 58.75. Smoliga also swam on the prelims relay of the 4 × 100 m medley relay, and won a gold medal when the finals lineup of Baker, Lilly King, Dana Vollmer, and Simone Manuel touched first.

=== 2018 World Championships ===
2018 World Short Course Championships
Gold medal – first place	50 m backstroke	25.88 (NR)
Gold medal – first place	100 m backstroke	56.19
Gold medal – first place	4x50 m freestyle	1:34.03
Gold medal – first place	4x100 m freestyle	3:27.78
Gold medal – first place	4x50 m medley	1:42.38 (WR)
Gold medal – first place	4x100 m medley	3:45.58 (CR)
Gold medal – first place	4x50 m mixed freestyle	1:27.89
Gold medal – first place	4x50 m mixed medley	1:36.40 (WR)

At the 2018 World Championships in Hangzhou, China, Smoliga won a record eight gold medals, setting a new Guinness World Record for the "most number of gold medals won at a single FINA World Championships" (short course or long course) by one swimmer, and breaking the former record of seven gold medals held by Michael Phelps and Caeleb Dressel. Smoliga went eight-for-eight at the Championships, winning the gold medal in every event she raced.

=== 2020 Tokyo Olympics ===
On the 2nd day of the 2020 U.S. Olympic Trials, Olivia Smoliga swam the prelim heats of the 100 backstroke touching 4th with a time of 59.24, just enough to secure a lane for the semifinals. During the semifinals, Smoliga won her heat with a 58.50, making her 2nd seed for the final.

On the 3rd day of the Trials, Olivia Smoliga scratched out of the 200 freestyle to focus on the 100 Backstroke final. During the final, Smoliga turned up just short of her 2nd Olympic berth, falling 12 hundredths behind Rhyan White.

On the sixth day of trials, Olivia posted a time of 53.63 in the 100 freestyle final to earn a spot on the Olympic team as a member of the 4x100 freestyle relay team.

At the Olympic Games, Olivia swam the lead-off leg during the prelims of the 4x100 Freestyle Relay, Splitting a 54.06. She was not chosen to swim in the finals.

=== International Swimming League ===
In 2019 Olivia was a member of the inaugural International Swimming League representing the Cali Condors, who finished third place in the final match in Las Vegas, Nevada in December. She was a top 10 point scorer for the season winning many events including the 50 backstroke in the final.

== Guinness World Records ==
- "Most gold medals won at a single FINA World Championships (individual)", December 16, 2018: 8 gold medals at the 14th FINA World Swimming Championships (25 m).

== Awards and honors ==
- SwimSwam Top 100 (Women's): 2021 (#36)
