= Paulina Schmiedel =

German swimmer

Personal information
- Nationality: German
- Born: 29 May 1993 (age 33)
- Height: 175 cm (5 ft 9 in)
- Weight: 61 kg (134 lb)

Sport
- Sport: Swimming

Paulina Schmiedel (born 29 May 1993) is a German swimmer. She competed in the women's 4 × 200 metre freestyle relay event at the 2016 Summer Olympics.
