= Fjorda Shabani =

Kosovan swimmer

Personal information
- Born: 8 July 2004 (age 22)

Sport
- Sport: Swimming

Fjorda Shabani (born 8 July 2004) is a Kosovan swimmer.

In 2018, represented Kosovo at the 2018 Mediterranean Games held in Tarragona, Spain. In that same year, she competed in the women's 50 metre freestyle and women's 100 metre freestyle events at the 2018 FINA World Swimming Championships (25 m) held in Hangzhou, China. In both events she did not advance to compete in the semi-finals.

In 2019, she represented Kosovo at the 2019 World Aquatics Championships held in Gwangju, South Korea. She competed in the women's 50 metre freestyle and women's 100 metre freestyle events. In both events she did not advance to compete in the semi-finals.
