= 2018 FINA World Swimming Championships (25 m) – Women's 100 metre backstroke =

Women's 100 metre backstroke at the 2018 FINA World Swimming Championships (25 m)
- Venue: Hangzhou Sports Park Stadium
- Dates: 11 December (heats and semifinals); 12 December (final)
- Competitors: 55 from 47 nations
- Winning time: 56.19

Medalists
gold medal	Olivia Smoliga	United States
silver medal	Katinka Hosszú	Hungary
bronze medal	Georgia Davies	Great Britain
bronze medal	Minna Atherton	Australia

The women's 100 metre backstroke competition of the 2018 FINA World Swimming Championships (25 m) was held on 11 and 12 December 2018.

== Records ==
Prior to the competition, the existing world and championship records were as follows.

	Name	Nation	Time	Location	Date
World record Championship record	Katinka Hosszú	Hungary	55.03	Doha	4 December 2014

== Results ==
=== Heats ===
The heats were started on 11 December at 11:49.

Rank	Heat	Lane	Name	Nationality	Time	Notes
1	4	5	Olivia Smoliga	United States	55.47	Q, AM
2	6	4	Emily Seebohm	Australia	57.08	Q
3	4	4	Katinka Hosszú	Hungary	57.09	Q
4	4	3	Simona Kubová	Czech Republic	57.13	Q
5	5	4	Kathleen Baker	United States	57.16	Q
6	6	5	Minna Atherton	Australia	57.17	Q
7	5	5	Michelle Coleman	Sweden	57.21	Q
8	6	3	Georgia Davies	Great Britain	57.24	Q
9	5	6	Sayaka Akase	Japan	57.36	Q
10	5	3	Emi Moronuki	Japan	57.42	Q
11	6	6	Fu Yuanhui	China	57.66	Q
12	4	2	Alicja Tchórz	Poland	57.78	Q
13	4	6	Anastasia Fesikova	Russia	57.85	Q
14	5	2	Mimosa Jallow	Finland	57.93	Q
15	4	0	Margherita Panziera	Italy	58.14	Q
16	4	7	Mathilde Cini	France	58.16	Q
17	6	2	Daria Ustinova	Russia	58.21	
18	5	9	Laura Riedemann	Germany	58.27	
19	5	1	Anastasiya Shkurdai	Belarus	58.44	
20	4	8	Andrea Berrino	Argentina	58.58	
21	6	7	Etiene Medeiros	Brazil	58.62	
22	5	7	Hanna Rosvall	Sweden	58.80	
23	3	5	Isabella Arcila	Colombia	58.83	
24	4	1	Caroline Pilhatsch	Austria	58.91	
25	6	9	Jenny Mensing	Germany	59.08	
26	3	1	Karolína Hájková	Slovakia	59.25	
27	6	0	Ekaterina Avramova	Turkey	59.26	
28	3	6	Ingrid Wilm	Canada	59.31	
29	6	1	Chen Jie	China	59.36	
30	5	8	Stephanie Au	Hong Kong	59.38	
31	5	0	Carlotta Zofkova	Italy	59.57	
32	3	3	Krystal Lara	Dominican Republic	1:00.28	NR
33	3	4	Gabriela Georgieva	Bulgaria	1:00.58	
34	3	2	África Zamorano	Spain	1:00.74	
35	3	8	Lushavel Stickland	Samoa	1:00.75	NR
36	1	5	Felicity Passon	Seychelles	1:00.81	NR
37	6	8	Paige Flynn	New Zealand	1:00.89	
38	4	9	Signhild Joensen	Faroe Islands	1:00.98	
39	2	4	Celina Márquez	El Salvador	1:01.27	NR
40	3	7	Tatiana Salcuțan	Moldova	1:02.96	
41	2	3	Andrea Becali	Cuba	1:03.96	
42	3	9	Mónica Ramírez	Andorra	1:04.06	
43	3	0	Trinidad Ardiles	Chile	1:04.23	NR
44	1	6	Camille Koenig	Mauritius	1:04.47	
45	2	6	Nimia Murua	Panama	1:05.09	
46	1	3	Ri Hye-gyong	North Korea	1:05.53	
47	2	2	Danielle Treasure	Barbados	1:06.74	
48	2	8	Colleen Furgeson	Marshall Islands	1:07.44	
49	2	1	Kimberly Ince	Grenada	1:07.68	
50	2	5	Yolani Blake	Fiji	1:07.87	
51	2	7	Eda Zeqiri	Kosovo	1:08.69	
52	1	4	Britheny Joassaint	Haiti	1:09.58	
53	2	0	Osisang Chilton	Palau	1:12.10	
54	2	9	Ada Thioune	Senegal	1:16.82	
55	1	7	Amanda Poppe	Guam	1:21.44	
	1	1	Hamna Ahmed	Maldives		DNS
	1	2	Naima Akter	Bangladesh		DNS

=== Semifinals ===
The semifinals were started on 11 December at 20:14.

==== Semifinal 1 ====
Rank	Lane	Name	Nationality	Time	Notes
1	6	Georgia Davies	Great Britain	56.49	Q
2	4	Emily Seebohm	Australia	56.84	Q
3	3	Minna Atherton	Australia	57.05	Q
4	5	Simona Kubová	Czech Republic	57.18	Q
5	2	Emi Moronuki	Japan	57.32	Q
6	8	Mathilde Cini	France	57.70	
7	1	Mimosa Jallow	Finland	57.86	
8	7	Alicja Tchórz	Poland	58.40	

==== Semifinal 2 ====
Rank	Lane	Name	Nationality	Time	Notes
1	4	Olivia Smoliga	United States	56.13	Q
2	3	Kathleen Baker	United States	56.27	Q
3	5	Katinka Hosszú	Hungary	56.46	Q
4	2	Sayaka Akase	Japan	57.48	
5	6	Michelle Coleman	Sweden	57.57	
6	7	Fu Yuanhui	China	57.83	
7	1	Anastasia Fesikova	Russia	57.88	
8	8	Margherita Panziera	Italy	58.31	

=== Final ===
The final was held on 12 December at 20:31.

Rank	Lane	Name	Nationality	Time	Notes
1st place, gold medalist(s)	4	Olivia Smoliga	United States	56.19	
2nd place, silver medalist(s)	3	Katinka Hosszú	Hungary	56.26	
3rd place, bronze medalist(s)	6	Georgia Davies	Great Britain	56.74	
3rd place, bronze medalist(s)	7	Minna Atherton	Australia	56.74	
5	5	Kathleen Baker	United States	56.89	
6	2	Emily Seebohm	Australia	56.98	
7	1	Simona Kubová	Czech Republic	57.03	
8	8	Emi Moronuki	Japan	57.18	
