= Andrea Kropp =

American swimmer (born 1993)

Personal information
- Nationality: United States
- Born: June 25, 1993
- Height: 5 ft 7 in (170 cm)

Sport
- Sport: Swimming
- Event: 100, 200 breaststroke
- Strokes: Breaststroke, Individual Medley
- Club: Rattler Swim Club (Age Group team)
- College team: University Southern California; Princeton University
- Coach: Susan Teeter (Princeton); Dave Salo (USC)
Medal record
Women's swimming
Representing the United States
World University Games
Silver medal – second place	2011 Shenzhen	200 m breaststroke

Andrea Kropp (June 25, 1993) is an American swimmer who competed for Princeton University and the University of Southern California. She competed at the 2011 World University Games winning a silver medal in the 200m breast. In a career, high point, she placed third in the 200m breaststroke final with a 2:24.82 in the US Women's Olympic Swimming Trials for the 2012 Olympics. A second place finish would have qualified her for the 2012 team.

== Early life ==
Andrea Kropp was born June 25, 1993 to father Robert and mother Laura Kropp. Her father was in business management and her mother worked as a teacher. In High School, she attended Flintridge Sacred Heart. During her High School years, she was a recipient of All-American honors for swimming nine times. She established age group records for Southern California in the 400 IM for ages 11-12, in the 200 breast for ages 11-12, and in the 100 breast for ages 15-16. She set four school records at Flintridge Sacred Heart in the 50-yard freestyle, the 200-yard IM, the 100-yard butterfly, and the 100-yard breaststroke. In addition to representing her High School in competition, she competed and trained representing the strong program at the Rattler Swim Club. 2008 Pasadena Star-News Cross Country Runner of the Year A multi-sport athlete in High School, in addition to swimming, she was an All-State honoree in the California Interscholastic Federation in Cross Country, she was a Runner of the Year in Cross Country in 2008 as announced by the Pasadena Star-News.

== College swimming ==
Kropp swam at Princeton University during her Freshman year under women's Coach Susan Teeter, but transferred to the USC in hopes that their strong program would help her qualify for the US Olympic Swimming Team. While at Princeton, Kropp set University records in the 100 breaststroke with a time of 1:01.38, and the 200 breaststroke with a time of 2:11.52.

At the University of Southern California, where she attended from 2012-2015, she again earned All American honors, and in her Junior year was twice a PAC-12 Conference finalist. At USC, she swam under the guidance and mentoring of Head Coach Dave Salo, and Head Assistant Coach Jeremy Kipp, and majored in Communications. Salo became a USC Coach around 2011. Kropp, as an able student, 2012 Pac-12 second team Academic honors with a 3.51 grade point average.
