= Megan Romano =

American swimmer (born 1991)

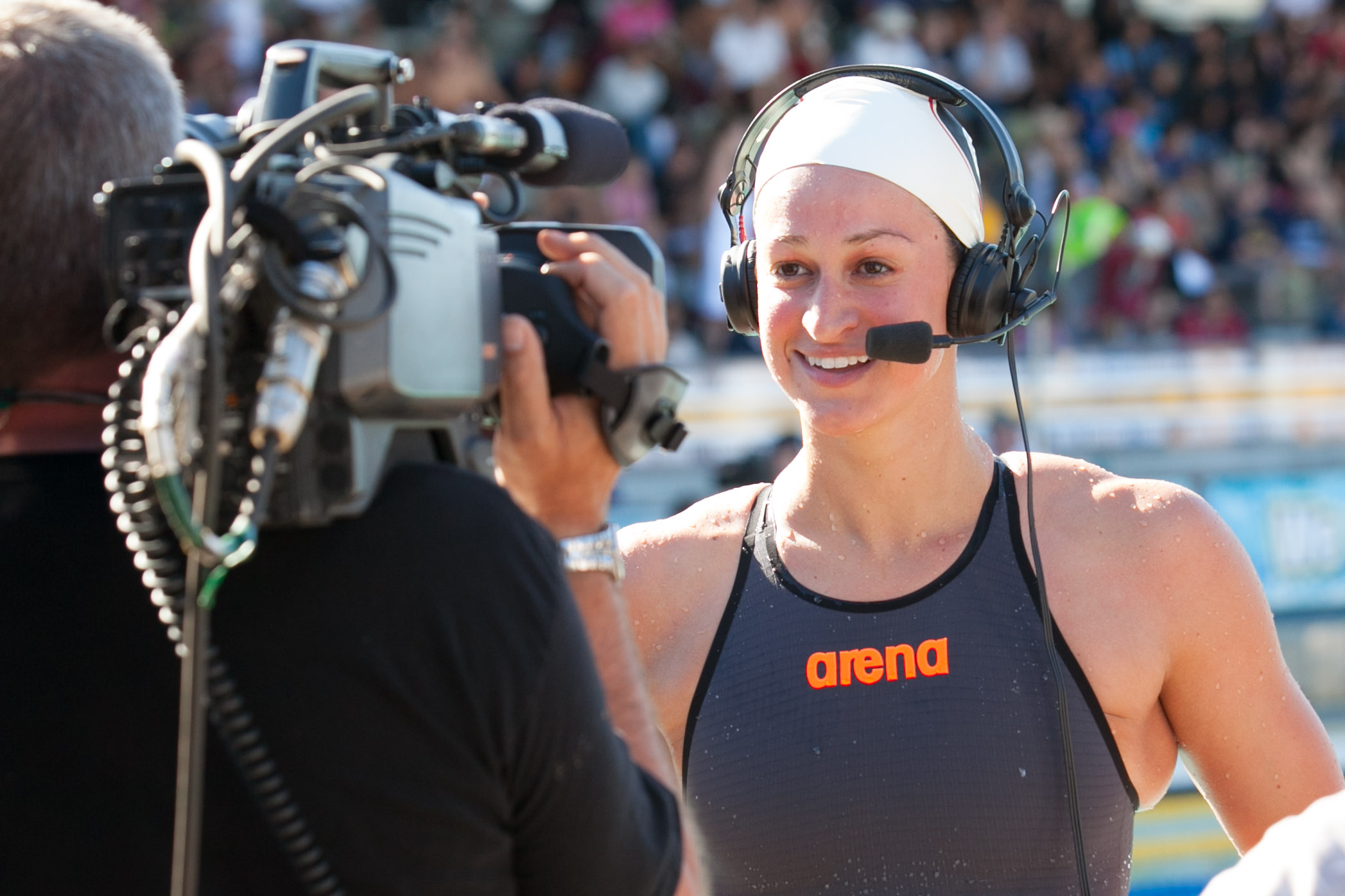
- Romano in 2013

Personal information
- National team: United States
- Born: February 2, 1991 (age 35) St. Petersburg, Florida, U.S.
- Height: 6 ft 2 in (1.88 m)
- Weight: 170 lb (77 kg)

Sport
- Sport: Swimming
- Strokes: Backstroke, freestyle
- Club: New York Athletic Club
- College team: University of Georgia
Medal record
Women's swimming
Representing the United States
World Championships (LC)
Gold medal – first place	2013 Barcelona	4×100 m freestyle
Gold medal – first place	2013 Barcelona	4×100 m medley
World Championships (SC)
Gold medal – first place	2012 Istanbul	4×100 m freestyle
Gold medal – first place	2012 Istanbul	4×200 m freestyle
Silver medal – second place	2012 Istanbul	100 m freestyle
Bronze medal – third place	2012 Istanbul	4×100 m medley
Summer Universiade
Gold medal – first place	2011 Shenzhen	4×200 m freestyle
Gold medal – first place	2013 Kazan	4×200 m freestyle
Silver medal – second place	2011 Shenzhen	4×100 m freestyle
Silver medal – second place	2011 Shenzhen	4×100 m medley
Silver medal – second place	2013 Kazan	100 m backstroke
Silver medal – second place	2013 Kazan	4×100 m freestyle
Bronze medal – third place	2011 Shenzhen	100 m freestyle
Bronze medal – third place	2013 Kazan	50 m freestyle
Bronze medal – third place	2013 Kazan	100 m freestyle
Bronze medal – third place	2013 Kazan	4×100 m medley

Megan Romano (born February 2, 1991) is an American competition swimmer who specializes in backstroke and freestyle events. She is part of the former American record women's 4x100-meter freestyle relay team, and is a former short-course yards American record-holder in the 200-yard freestyle and 4x200-meter freestyle relay. Along with her Georgia Bulldogs teammates, she won the NCAA Division I women's team championship in 2013.

== Swimming career ==
At the 2012 United States Olympic Trials, the qualifying meet for the 2012 Olympics, Romano narrowly missed the Olympic team by finishing seventh in the 200-meter freestyle with a time of 1:58.56 (the top six finishers were selected for the relay). Romano also competed in the final of the 100-meter backstroke and place eighth in the final.

At the 2012 Short Course World Championships, Romano won four medals: two gold, one silver, and one bronze. On the first day, Romano led off the relay and had a split of 1:56.03 in the 4×200 free relay. Along with teammates Chelsea Chenault, Shannon Vreeland, and Allison Schmitt, they won with a time of 7:39.25. Romano earned her first individual medal with a silver in the 100-meter free on the third day of competition, finishing behind Germany's Britta Steffen with a 52.48. Later, she anchored the 4×100 medley relay to a bronze-medal-winning 3:51.43 with the fastest split in the field of 51.90. In Romano's last event, she led off the relay with a split of 52.86, and along with Jessica Hardy, Lia Neal, and Allison Schmitt, won the 4×100 free relay in 3:31.01, nearly two seconds ahead of second-place finisher Australia.

At the 2013 World Aquatics Championships in Barcelona, Romano anchored the women's 4×100-meter freestyle relay to a gold medal, overtaking Australia's Alicia Coutts in the final 100 meters. She entered the water 7 tenths of a second behind Coutts, but beat the Australian by a margin of 0.12. Her split of 52.60 was a personal best and second-fastest of anyone in the field. The final relay time of 3:32.31 bettered the previous American record of 3:34.24. Romano earned her second medal, a gold, in the 4×100-meter medley relay with Missy Franklin, Jessica Hardy, and Dana Vollmer. Swimming the anchor leg, Romano recorded a split of 53.43 and the team finished with a time of 3:53.23.

In 2025, Romano announced that she would participate in the Enhanced Games in 2026, the first woman to say she will participate.

== Personal bests ==
Long course (50 m pool)
Event	Time	City	Date
50 m backstroke	28.56	Charlotte	May 10, 2013
100 m backstroke	59.85	Kazan	July 13, 2013
200 m backstroke	2:09:08	Indianapolis	August 11, 2012
50 m freestyle	24.98	Kazan	July 16, 2013
100 m freestyle	53.90	Indianapolis	June 25, 2013
200 m freestyle	1:57.54	Indianapolis	August 10, 2012

== See also ==
- List of University of Georgia people
- Georgia Bulldogs
