= Sally Hunter (swimmer) =

Australian swimmer (born 1985)

Personal information
- Full name: Sally Hunter
- National team: Australia
- Born: 13 April 1985 (age 41) Perth, Western Australia
- Height: 1.72 m (5 ft 8 in)
- Weight: 62 kg (137 lb)

Sport
- Sport: Swimming
- Strokes: Freestyle, breaststroke
- Club: Central Aquatic; Marion
- Coach: Peter Bishop
Medal record
Swimming
Representing Australia
World Championships (LC)
Gold medal – first place	2007 Melbourne	4×100 m freestyle
Silver medal – second place	2009 Rome	4×100 m medley
Silver medal – second place	2013 Barcelona	4×100 m medley
Bronze medal – third place	2009 Rome	4×100 m freestyle
World Championships (SC)
Silver medal – second place	2008 Manchester	200 m breaststroke
Silver medal – second place	2008 Manchester	4×100 m freestyle
Silver medal – second place	2012 Istanbul	4×100 m freestyle
Silver medal – second place	2012 Istanbul	4×100 m medley
Silver medal – second place	2014 Doha	4×100 m medley
Commonwealth Games
Gold medal – first place	2014 Glasgow	4×100 m medley
Silver medal – second place	2014 Glasgow	200 m breaststroke

Sally Hunter (born 13 April 1985), née Sally Foster, is an Australian breaststroke swimmer. She won the silver medal in the 200-metre breaststroke event at the 2008 FINA Short Course World Championships. Hunter is an Australian Institute of Sport scholarship holder. She competed in the 200-metre breaststroke at the 2008 Summer Olympics in Beijing and at the 2012 Summer Olympics in London, reaching the final in 2012. She won the silver medal in the 200 m breaststroke at the 2014 Commonwealth Games, and was a member of Australia's gold-medal-winning 4×100-metre medley relay team.
