= Melisa Zhdrella =

Kosovan swimmer

Personal information
- Nationality: Kosovan
- Born: 10 May 2000 (age 26) Pristina, FR Yugoslavia

Sport
- Sport: Swimming

Melisa Zhdrella (born 10 May 2000) is a Kosovan swimmer. She competed in the women's 100 metre breaststroke event at the 2017 World Aquatics Championships.
