= Rita Zeqiri =

Kosovan swimmer

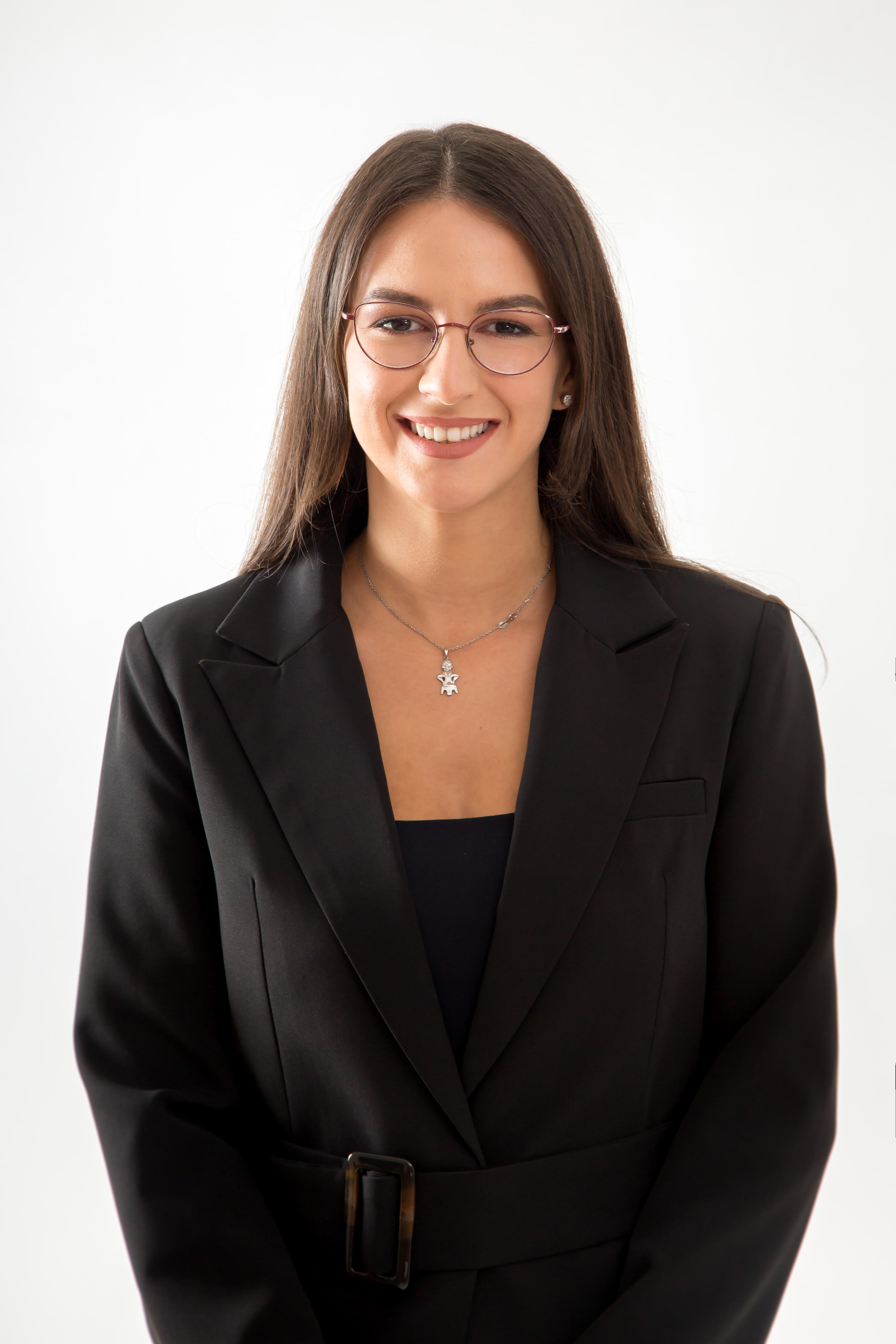

Personal information
- Nationality: Kosovo
- Born: 8 December 1995 (age 30)

Sport
- Sport: Swimming
- Club: STEP

Rita Zeqiri (born 8 December 1995) is a Kosovan swimmer. She competed in the women's 100 metre backstroke event at the 2016 Summer Olympics. She currently works for STEP swimming center as a trainer. She also is the sister of olympian Eda Zeqiri, who represented Kosovo in the 2020 Summer Olympics in Tokyo.
