= Lum Zhaveli =

Kosovan swimmer

Personal information
- Nationality: Kosovan
- Born: 5 March 1990 (age 35); Pristina, SAP Kosovo, SR Serbia, SFR Yugoslavia
- Height: 1.94 m (6 ft 4 in)
- Weight: 88 kg (194 lb)

Sport
- Country: Kosovo
- Sport: Swimming

Lum Zhaveli (born 5 March 1990) is a Kosovan Olympic swimmer. He represented his country at the 2016 Summer Olympics in the Men's 50 metre freestyle event where he ranked at #57 with a time of 24.32 seconds. He did not advance to the semifinals.

Zhaveli graduated from the University of Arizona in Tucson, Arizona with his master's degree in computer science in the spring of 2017.
