= Kosovo Swimming Federation =

Sports governing body in Kosovo

LEN
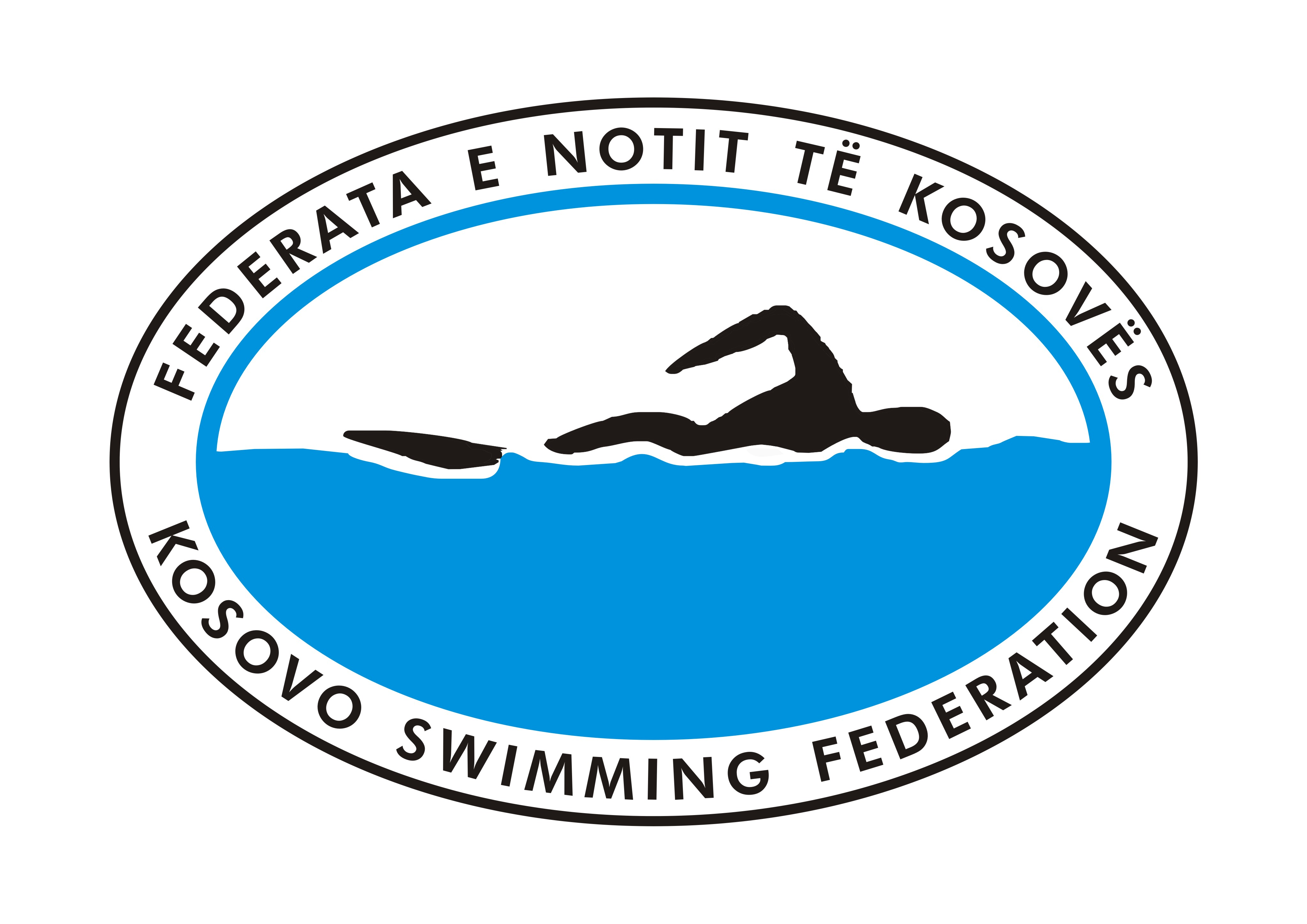
- Association crest
- Founded: 1997
- FINA affiliation: 17 February 2015
- LEN affiliation: 2015
- President: Ymer Rama

The Kosovo Swimming Federation, also known as the Swimming Federation of Kosovo (Albanian: Federata e Notit të Kosovës, Serbian: Пливачки савез Косова / Plivački savez Kosova; abbr. Albanian: FNK, Serbian: ПСК / PSK), is the national governing body of swimming in Kosovo. Founded in 1997, the FNK became a full member of the International Swimming Federation (FINA) on 17 February 2015. The FNK collaborates with the Albanian Swimming Federation where in 2012 a joint swimming tournament was hosted by the two federations.

The Kosovo Swimming Federation participated in its first FINA international competition in the 2015 World Aquatics Championships in Kazan, Russia.

FNK participated in the 2016 Olympic games in Rio de Janeiro, Brazil.

== See also ==
- Olympic Committee of Kosovo
- Kosovo at the Olympics
