= List of Games of the Small States of Europe records in swimming =

Below is a complete list of the Games of the Small States of Europe records in swimming, ratified by the National Olympic Committees of the 9 European member federations. They all are members of the European Olympic Committees (EOC) and have a population of less than one million. Participating countries are:

- Andorra
- Cyprus
- Iceland
- Liechtenstein
- Luxembourg
- Malta,
- Monaco
- Montenegro*
- San Marino

(*) Montenegro became the ninth GSSE country on June 1, 2009; at a meeting held presumably at the 2009 Games.

Competition is held in long course (50 m) pools.

== Men ==
Event	Time		Name	Nationality	Date	Meet	Location	Ref
50m freestyle	22.68		Kyle Micallef	Malta	1 June 2023	2023 GSSE	Msida, Malta	
100m freestyle	49.04		Ralph Daleiden	Luxembourg	27 May 2025	2025 GSSE	Andorra la Vella, Andorra	
200m freestyle	1:49.46	r	Ralph Daleiden	Luxembourg	29 May 2025	2025 GSSE	Andorra la Vella, Andorra	
400m freestyle	3:56.17		Pit Brandenburger	Luxembourg	29 May 2019	2019 GSSE	Podgorica, Montenegro	
800m freestyle	8:17.44		Théo Druenne	Monaco	30 May 2023	2023 GSSE	Msida, Malta	
1500m freestyle	15:47.49		Pit Brandenburger	Luxembourg	28 May 2019	2019 GSSE	Podgorica, Montenegro	
50m backstroke	25.46	h	Rufus Bernhardt	Liechtenstein	28 May 2025	2025 GSSE	Andorra la Vella, Andorra	
100m backstroke	55.82		Rufus Bernhardt	Liechtenstein	29 May 2025	2025 GSSE	Andorra la Vella, Andorra	
200m backstroke	2:01.71		Jean-François Schneiders	Luxembourg	28 May 2013	2013 GSSE	Luxembourg, Luxembourg	
50m breaststroke	27.93	=	Anton Sveinn McKee	Iceland	29 May 2019	2019 GSSE	Podgorica, Montenegro	
50m breaststroke	27.93	=	Snorri Einarsson	Iceland	30 May 2025	2025 GSSE	Andorra la Vella, Andorra	
100m breaststroke	1:00.33		Anton Sveinn McKee	Iceland	30 May 2019	2019 GSSE	Podgorica, Montenegro	
200m breaststroke	2:10.41		Anton Sveinn McKee	Iceland	29 May 2019	2019 GSSE	Podgorica, Montenegro	
50m butterfly	23.77	h	Miloš Milenković	Montenegro	28 May 2025	2025 GSSE	Andorra la Vella, Andorra	
100m butterfly	53.71		Miloš Milenković	Montenegro	29 May 2025	2025 GSSE	Andorra la Vella, Andorra	
200m butterfly	2:02.34		Christoph Meier	Liechtenstein	28 May 2019	2019 GSSE	Podgorica, Montenegro	
200m individual medley	2:00.28		Raphaël Stacchiotti	Luxembourg	2 June 2015	2015 GSSE	Reykjavík, Iceland	
400m individual medley	4:23.36		Christoph Meier	Liechtenstein	2 June 2017	2017 GSSE	Serravalle, San Marino	
4×100m freestyle relay	3:23.78		Julien Henx (50.77); Max Mannes (51.74); Pit Brandenburger (50.64); Raphaël Stacchiotti (50.63)	Luxembourg	2 June 2017	2017 GSSE	Serravalle, San Marino	
4×200m freestyle relay	7:28.91		Ralph Daleiden (1:52.04); Pit Brandenburger (1:52.77); Florian Frippiat (1:53.16); Max Mannes (1:50.94)	Luxembourg	31 May 2023	2023 GSSE	Msida, Malta	
4×100m medley relay	3:43.14		Gudmundur Rafnsson (56.60); Snorri Einarsson (1:02.28); Birnir Hálfdánarsson (53.98); Simon Statkevicius (50.28)	Iceland	28 May 2025	2025 GSSE	Andorra la Vella, Andorra	

Legend: # – Record awaiting ratification by Games of the Small States of Europe NOC; WR – World record; ER – European record;
Records not set in finals: h – heat; sf – semifinal; r – relay 1st leg; rh – relay heat 1st leg; b – B final; † – en route to final mark; so – swim-off; tt – time trial

== Women ==
Event	Time		Name	Nationality	Date	Meet	Location	Ref
50m freestyle	25.23		Kalia Antoniou	Cyprus	1 June 2023	2023 GSSE	Msida, Malta	
100m freestyle	54.70		Kalia Antoniou	Cyprus	27 May 2025	2025 GSSE	Andorra la Vella, Andorra	
200m freestyle	1:58.91		Snæfríður Jórunnardóttir	Iceland	1 June 2023	2023 GSSE	Msida, Malta	
400m freestyle	4:12.31		Julia Hassler	Liechtenstein	31 May 2017	2017 GSSE	Serravalle, San Marino	
800m freestyle	8:36.14		Julia Hassler	Liechtenstein	2 June 2017	2017 GSSE	Serravalle, San Marino	
1500m freestyle	16:57.00		Lisa Pou	Monaco	28 May 2025	2025 GSSE	Andorra la Vella, Andorra	
50m backstroke	29.27		Kalia Antoniou	Cyprus	30 May 2025	2025 GSSE	Andorra la Vella, Andorra	
100m backstroke	1:00.95	r	Eygló Ósk Gústafsdóttir	Iceland	1 June 2017	2017 GSSE	Serravalle, San Marino	
200m backstroke	2:12.52		Eygló Ósk Gústafsdóttir	Iceland	2 June 2015	2015 GSSE	Reykjavík, Iceland	
50m breaststroke	31.53	†	Hrafnhildur Lúthersdóttir	Iceland	4 June 2015	2015 GSSE	Reykjavík, Iceland	
100m breaststroke	1:08.07		Hrafnhildur Lúthersdóttir	Iceland	4 June 2015	2015 GSSE	Reykjavík, Iceland	
200m breaststroke	2:25.39		Hrafnhildur Lúthersdóttir	Iceland	3 June 2015	2015 GSSE	Reykjavík, Iceland	
50m butterfly	26.80		Kalia Antoniou	Cyprus	30 May 2025	2025 GSSE	Andorra la Vella, Andorra	
100m butterfly	1:00.91		Jóhanna Gerða Gústafsdóttir	Iceland	3 June 2015	2015 GSSE	Reykjavík, Iceland	
200m butterfly	2:15.39		Julia Hassler	Liechtenstein	28 May 2019	2019 GSSE	Podgorica, Montenegro	
200m individual medley	2:13.83		Hrafnhildur Lúthersdóttir	Iceland	2 June 2015	2015 GSSE	Reykjavík, Iceland	
400m individual medley	4:46.70		Hrafnhildur Lúthersdóttir	Iceland	5 June 2015	2015 GSSE	Reykjavík, Iceland	
4×100m freestyle relay	3:47.27		Bryndís Rún Hansen (55.98); Eygló Ósk Gústafsdóttir (56.72); Ingibjörg Kristín Jónsdóttir (57.34); Jóhanna Gerða Gústafsdóttir (57.23)	Iceland	5 June 2015	2015 GSSE	Reykjavík, Iceland	
4×200m freestyle relay	8:20.96		Bryndís Rún Hansen (2:03.80); Inga Elin Cryer (2:06.43); Ingibjörg Kristín Jónsdóttir (2:06.32); Jóhanna Gerða Gústafsdóttir (2:04.41)	Iceland	3 June 2015	2015 GSSE	Reykjavík, Iceland	
4×100m medley relay	4:10.50		Eygló Ósk Gústafsdóttir (1:00.95); Hrafnhildur Lúthersdóttir (1:08.52); Inga Elin Cryer (1:04.22); Bryndís Rún Hansen (56.81)	Iceland	1 June 2017	2017 GSSE	Serravalle, San Marino	

Legend: # – Record awaiting ratification by Games of the Small States of Europe NOC; WR – World record; ER – European record;
Records not set in finals: h – heat; sf – semifinal; r – relay 1st leg; rh – relay heat 1st leg; b – B final; † – en route to final mark; so – swim-off; tt – time trial

== Mixed relay ==
Event	Time	Name	Nationality	Date	Location	Ref
4×100m medley relay	3:54.91	Gudmundur Rafnsson (56.67); Einar Agustsson (1:01.46); Johanna Gudmundsdottir (1:01.50); Snaefriou Jorunnardóttir (55.28)	Iceland	30 May 2025	2025 GSSE	Andorra la Vella, Andorra

Legend: # – Record awaiting ratification by Games of the Small States of Europe NOC; WR – World record; ER – European record;
Records not set in finals: h – heat; sf – semifinal; r – relay 1st leg; rh – relay heat 1st leg; b – B final; † – en route to final mark; so – swim-off; tt – time trial
