= List of Luxembourgish records in swimming =

This is a complete list of the Luxembourgish records in swimming, which are ratified by the Fédération Luxembourgeoise de Natation et de Sauvetage (FLNS).

== Long course (50 m) ==
=== Men ===
| Event | Time | | Name | Club | Date | Meet | Location | Ref |
|---|---|---|---|---|---|---|---|---|
| 50 m freestyle | 21.91 | h | Rémi Fabiani | Unattached | 4 December 2025 | U.S. Open | Austin, United States | |
| 100 m freestyle | 48.60 | rh | Ralph Daleiden | Luxembourg | 27 July 2025 | World Championships | Singapore, Singapore | |
| 100 m freestyle | 48.44 | h, # | Rémi Fabiani | Luxembourg | 11 August 2026 | European Championships | Paris, France | |
| 200 m freestyle | 1:47.74 | h | Ralph Daleiden | Luxembourg | 28 July 2025 | World Championships | Singapore, Singapore | |
| 400 m freestyle | 3:56.17 | | Pit Brandenburger | Luxembourg | 29 May 2019 | Games of the Small States of Europe | Podgorica, Montenegro | |
| 800 m freestyle | 8:20.88 | | Pit Brandenburger | Luxembourg | 6 April 2019 | Bergen Swim Festival | Bergen, Norway | |
| 1500 m freestyle | 15:47.49 | | Pit Brandenburger | Luxembourg | 28 May 2019 | Games of the Small States of Europe | Podgorica, Montenegro | |
| 50 m backstroke | 25.29 | | Rémi Fabiani | Sun Devil | 18 June 2026 | TYR Pro Swim Series | Indianapolis, United States | |
| 50 m backstroke | 24.73 | h, # | Rémi Fabiani | Luxembourg | 13 August 2026 | European Championships | Paris, France | |
| 100 m backstroke | 54.21 | | Rémi Fabiani | Schwammclub Deifferdang | 12 July 2026 | Luxembourgish Championships | Luxembourg, Luxembourg | |
| 200 m backstroke | 2:01.71 | | Jean François Schneiders | Luxembourg | 28 May 2013 | Games of the Small States of Europe | Luxembourg, Luxembourg | |
| 50m breaststroke | 27.94 | h | Laurent Carnol | Luxembourg | 4 August 2015 | World Championships | Kazan, Russia | |
| 100m breaststroke | 1:00.76 | h | Laurent Carnol | Luxembourg | 28 July 2013 | World Championships | Barcelona, Spain | |
| 200m breaststroke | 2:09.78 | | Laurent Carnol | SC Le Dauphin Ettelbruck | 28 January 2012 | - | Luxembourg | |
| 50m butterfly | 23.55 | | Julien Henx | Cercle de Natation Dudelange | 30 April 2022 | Diddelenger Schwammfest | Luxembourg City, Luxembourg | |
| 100m butterfly | 53.51 | | Florian Frippiat | Luxembourg | 9 May 2026 | Acropolis Open | Athens, Greece | |
| 100m butterfly | 53.49 | h, # | Florian Frippiat | Luxembourg | 12 August 2026 | European Championships | Paris, France | |
| 200m butterfly | 2:00.61 | | Florian Frippiat | Schwammclub Deifferdang | 14 March 2026 | CIJ Meet | Luxembourg City, Luxembourg | |
| 200m individual medley | 1:59.62 | h | Raphaël Stacchiotti | Luxembourg | 24 July 2019 | World Championships | Gwangju, South Korea | |
| 400m individual medley | 4:17.20 | h | Raphaël Stacchiotti | Luxembourg | 28 July 2012 | Olympic Games | London, Great Britain | |
| 4×100m freestyle relay | 3:20.07 | h | Ralph Daleiden (48.86); Rémi Fabiani (48.65); Joao Soares Carneiro (51.90); Finn Kemp (50.66) | Luxembourg | 20 June 2024 | European Championships | Belgrade, Serbia | |
| 4×100m freestyle relay | 3:17.32 | h, # | Ralph Daleiden (48.55); Rémi Fabiani (48.37); Finn Kemp (50.64); Florian Frippiat (49.76) | Luxembourg | 13 August 2026 | European Championships | Paris, France | |
| 4×200m freestyle relay | 7:28.91 | | Ralph Daleiden (1:52.04); Pit Brandenburger (1:52.77); Florian Frippiat (1:53.16); Max Mannes (1:50.94) | Luxembourg | 31 May 2023 | Games of the Small States of Europe | Msida, Malta | |
| 4×100m medley relay | 3:41.40 | h | Rémi Fabiani (55.65); Finn Kemp (1:02.24); Joao Soares Carneiro (55.01); Ralph Daleiden (48.50) | Luxembourg | 23 June 2024 | European Championships | Belgrade, Serbia | |
| 4×100m medley relay | 3:40.99 | h, not ratified | Rémi Fabiani (55.91); Joao Carneiro (1:01.63); Julien Henx (54.57); Ralph Daleiden (48.88) | Luxembourg | 3 August 2025 | World Championships | Singapore, Singapore | |

Legend: # – Record awaiting ratification by FLNS; WR – World record; ER – European record; e – equalled existing record;
Records not set in finals: h – heat; sf – semifinal; r – relay 1st leg; rh – relay heat 1st leg; b – B final; † – en route to final mark; so – swim-off; tt – time trial

=== Women ===
| Event | Time | | Name | Club | Date | Meet | Location | Ref |
|---|---|---|---|---|---|---|---|---|
| 50m freestyle | 24.78 | sf | Julie Meynen | Luxembourg | 27 July 2019 | World Championships | Gwangju, South Korea | |
| 100m freestyle | 54.44 | h | Julie Meynen | Luxembourg | 25 July 2019 | World Championships | Gwangju, South Korea | |
| 200m freestyle | 2:00.71 | | Monique Olivier | University of Edinburgh | 14 March 2020 | Edinburgh International Meet | Edinburgh, Great Britain | |
| 400m freestyle | 4:11.59 | | Monique Olivier | University of Edinburgh | 13 March 2020 | Edinburgh International Meet | Edinburgh, Great Britain | |
| 800m freestyle | 8:45.37 | h | Monique Olivier | Luxembourg | 7 August 2015 | World Championships | Kazan, Russia | |
| 1500m freestyle | 16:43.21 | | Monique Olivier | Luxembourg | 3 August 2015 | World Championships | Kazan, Russia | |
| 50m backstroke | 29.46 | | Sarah Rolko | - | 10 July 2009 | - | Prague, Czech Republic | |
| 100m backstroke | 1:02.97 | h | Sarah Rolko | Luxembourg | 27 July 2009 | World Championships | Rome, Italy | |
| 200m backstroke | 2:14.51 | | Sarah Rolko | - | 8 July 2009 | - | Prague, Czech Republic | |
| 50m breaststroke | 33.26 | | Maud Allar | Luxembourg | 27 April 2025 | Berlin Open | Berlin, Germany | |
| 100m breaststroke | 1:12.39 | | Maud Allar | Differdange | 4 May 2024 | Diddelenger Schwammfest | Luxembourg City, Luxembourg | |
| 200m breaststroke | 2:34.58 | b | Emma Barthel | Luxembourg | 31 January 2026 | Euro Meet | Luxembourg, Luxembourg | |
| 200m breaststroke | 2:33.93 | h, # | Emma Barthel | Luxembourg | 13 August 2026 | European Championships | Paris, France | |
| 50m butterfly | 27.66 | | Julie Meynen | Auburn University Swim Club | 21 June 2019 | Richard Quick Invitational | Auburn, United States | |
| 100m butterfly | 1:02.02 | sf | Lena Peters | Luxembourg | 24 July 2019 | European Youth Olympic Festival | Baku, Azerbaijan | |
| 200m butterfly | 2:15.58 | b | Monique Olivier | Luxembourg | 24 January 2020 | Euro Meet | Luxembourg City, Luxembourg | |
| 200 m individual medley | 2:19.21 | h | Emma Barthel | Luxembourg | 11 July 2026 | European Junior Championships | Munich, Germany | |
| 400 m individual medley | 4:52.95 | h | Emma Barthel | Luxembourg | 20 March 2026 | Giant Open | Saint-Denis, France | |
| 400 m individual medley | 4:52.24 | h, # | Emma Barthel | Luxembourg | 12 August 2026 | European Championships | Paris, France | |
| 4×100m freestyle relay | 3:52.69 | | Julie Meynen (55.98); Monique Olivier (58.27); Jacqueline Banky (59.08); Sarah Rolko (59.36) | Luxembourg | 31 May 2013 | Games of the Small States of Europe | Luxembourg, Luxembourg | |
| 4×200m freestyle relay | 8:28.24 | | Julie Meynen (2:04.66); Monique Olivier (2:05.00); Jacqueline Banky (2:09.64); Christina Roch (2:08.94) | Luxembourg | 29 May 2013 | Games of the Small States of Europe | Luxembourg, Luxembourg | |
| 4×100m medley relay | 4:23.22 | | Sarah Rolko (1:05.76); Julie Meynen (1:03.35); Jil Einhorn (1:15.51); Christina Roch (58.60) | Luxembourg | 30 May 2013 | Games of the Small States of Europe | Luxembourg, Luxembourg | |

Legend: # – Record awaiting ratification by FLNS; WR – World record; ER – European record; e – equalled existing record;
Records not set in finals: h – heat; sf – semifinal; r – relay 1st leg; rh – relay heat 1st leg; b – B final; † – en route to final mark; so – swim-off; tt – time trial

=== Mixed relay ===
| Event | Time | | Name | Club | Date | Meet | Location | Ref |
|---|---|---|---|---|---|---|---|---|
| 4×100 m freestyle relay | 3:33.55 | h | Julien Henx (51.30); Raphaël Stacchiotti (49.82); Julie Meynen (55.22); Monique Olivier (57.21) | Luxembourg | 27 July 2019 | World Championships | Gwangju, South Korea | |
| 4×100 m medley relay | 4:00.59 | | Rémi Fabiani (57.35); Raphaël Stacchiotti (1:03.56); Lena Peters (1:02.49); Monique Olivier (57.19) | Luxembourg | 26 January 2020 | Euro Meet | Luxembourg City, Luxembourg | |

Legend: # – Record awaiting ratification by FLNS; WR – World record; ER – European record; e – equalled existing record;
Records not set in finals: h – heat; so – swim-off

== Short Course (25 m) ==
=== Men ===
| Event | Time | | Name | Club | Date | Meet | Location | Ref |
|---|---|---|---|---|---|---|---|---|
| 50m freestyle | 21.36 | h | Ralph Daleiden | Sun Devil Aquatics | 29 October 2026 | World Championship Trials | Westmont, United States | |
| 100m freestyle | 46.63 | h | Ralph Daleiden | Sun Devil Aquatics | 30 October 2026 | World Championship Trials | Westmont, United States | |
| 200m freestyle | 1:42.93 | h | Ralph Daleiden | Sun Devil Aquatics | 31 October 2026 | World Championship Trials | Westmont, United States | |
| 400m freestyle | 3:46.42 | | Raphaël Stacchiotti | SC Le Dauphin Ettelbruck | 2 December 2017 | Luxembourgish Championships | Oberkorn, Luxembourg | |
| 800m freestyle | 8:07.96 | h, † | Pit Brandenburger | Luxembourg | 15 December 2018 | World Championships | Hangzhou, China | |
| 1500m freestyle | 15:25.72 | h | Pit Brandenburger | Luxembourg | 15 December 2018 | World Championships | Hangzhou, China | |
| 50m backstroke | 23.57 | | Rémi Fabiani | Arizona State University | 25 September 2026 | - | Phoenix, United States | |
| 100m backstroke | 53.34 | h | Raphaël Stacchiotti | Luxembourg | 5 December 2019 | European Championships | Glasgow, Great Britain | |
| 200m backstroke | 1:56.29 | | Rémi Fabiani | Schwammclub Deifferdang | 17 November 2019 | Luxembourgish Championships | Differdange, Luxembourg | |
| 50m breaststroke | 27.30 | | Laurent Carnol | SC Le Dauphin Ettelbruck | 12 December 2015 | Luxembourgish Championships | Dudelange, Luxembourg | |
| 100m breaststroke | 58.76 | | Finn Kemp | Loughborough University | 15 November 2025 | BUCS Championships | Sheffield, Great Britain | |
| 200m breaststroke | 2:07.10 | h | Laurent Carnol | Luxembourg | 17 December 2010 | World Championships | Dubai, United Arab Emirates | |
| 50m butterfly | 23.15 | | Julien Henx | Cercle Des Nageurs de Talence | 14 December 2019 | French Championships | Angers, France | |
| 100m butterfly | 51.52 | | Philippe Weyland | Luxembourg Sharks | 14 November 2026 | International Challenge of the City of Dudelange | Dudelange, Luxembourg | |
| 200m butterfly | 1:54.56 | | Philippe Weyland | Luxembourg Sharks | 15 November 2026 | International Challenge of the City of Dudelange | Dudelange, Luxembourg | |
| 100m individual medley | 53.44 | sf | Raphaël Stacchiotti | Luxembourg | 5 December 2015 | European Championships | Netanya, Israel | |
| 200m individual medley | 1:55.53 | h | Raphaël Stacchiotti | Luxembourg | 4 December 2015 | European Championships | Netanya, Israel | |
| 400m individual medley | 4:06.48 | | Raphaël Stacchiotti | Luxembourg | 3 December 2015 | European Championships | Netanya, Israel | |
| 4×50m freestyle relay | 1:28.84 | h | Julien Henx (21.78); Rémi Fabiani (22.93); Raphaël Stacchiotti (22.00); Max Mannes (22.13) | Luxembourg | 4 December 2019 | European Championships | Glasgow, Great Britain | |
| 4×100m freestyle relay | 3:22.61 | | Florian Frippiat (50.28); Stefano Valentini (51.11); Pit Brandenburger (51.72); Stanislas Chausson (50.04) | Schwammclub Deifferdang | 30 November 2024 | Luxembourgish Championships | Oberkorn, Luxembourg | |
| 4×200m freestyle relay | 7:47.17 | | Florian Frippiat (1:52.40); Stefano Valentini (1:59.66); Pit Brandenburger (1:57.71); Stanislas Chausson (1:57.40) | Schwammclub Deifferdang | 5 October 2024 | Endurance Challenge | Bonnevoie, Luxembourg | |
| 4×50m medley relay | 1:37.34 | h | Rémi Fabiani (25.23); Raphaël Stacchiotti (27.17); Julien Henx (22.77); Max Mannes (22.17) | Luxembourg | 8 December 2019 | European Championships | Glasgow, Great Britain | |
| 4×100m medley relay | 3:42.85 | | Max Mannes (54.85); Yann Van Den Bossche (1:01.75); Ralph Daleiden (55.69); Stephan Vanderschrick (50.56) | Swimming Luxembourg | 19 November 2019 | Luxembourgish Championships | Differdange, Luxembourg | |

Legend: # – Record awaiting ratification by FLNS; WR – World record; ER – European record; e – equalled existing record;
Records not set in finals: h – heat; sf – semifinal; r – relay 1st leg; rh – relay heat 1st leg; b – B final; † – en route to final mark; so – swim-off; tt – time trial

=== Women ===
| Event | Time | | Name | Club | Date | Meet | Location | Ref |
|---|---|---|---|---|---|---|---|---|
| 50 m freestyle | 24.75 | | Julie-Marie Meynen | Toronto Titans | 6 November 2020 | International Swimming League | Budapest, Hungary | |
| 100 m freestyle | 53.39 | r | Julie-Marie Meynen | Toronto Titans | 24 October 2020 | International Swimming League | Budapest, Hungary | |
| 200 m freestyle | 1:58.36 | h | Monique Olivier | Luxembourg | 7 December 2019 | European Championships | Glasgow, Great Britain | |
| 400 m freestyle | 4:09.42 | | Monique Olivier | University of Edinburgh | 30 October 2021 | North Sea Meet | Stavanger, Norway | |
| 800 m freestyle | 8:35.09 | | Monique Olivier | Luxembourg | 4 December 2014 | World Championships | Doha, Qatar | |
| 1500 m freestyle | 16:46.47 | h | Lou Jominet | Luxembourg | 6 December 2025 | European Championships | Lublin, Poland | |
| 50m backstroke | 28.46 | h | Sarah Rolko | Luxembourg | 14 November 2009 | World Cup | Berlin, Germany | |
| 100m backstroke | 1:00.98 | h | Sarah Rolko | Luxembourg | 15 November 2009 | World Cup | Berlin, Germany | |
| 200m backstroke | 2:11.31 | h | Sarah Rolko | Luxembourg | 25 November 2012 | European Championships | Chartres, France | |
| 50m breaststroke | 31.95 | | Julie-Marie Meynen | SC Le Dauphin Ettelbruck | 12 December 2015 | Luxembourgish Championships | Dudelange, Luxembourg | |
| 100m breaststroke | 1:10.87 | | Maud Allar | Schwammclub Deifferdeng | 26 November 2023 | - | Oberkorn, Luxembourg | |
| 200m breaststroke | 2:31.49 | h | Aurélie Waltzing | Schwammclub Deifferdeng | 28 November 2010 | International Junior Meet | Bonn, Germany | |
| 50m butterfly | 27.13 | | Julie-Marie Meynen | SC Le Dauphin Ettelbruck | 13 December 2015 | Luxembourgish Championships | Dudelange, Luxembourg | |
| 100m butterfly | 1:00.90 | | Julie-Marie Meynen | Plymouth Leander SC | 8 December 2013 | ASA South West Region Championships | Great Britain | |
| 200m butterfly | 2:13.12 | | Monique Olivier | Edinburgh | 1 November 2019 | North Sea Meet | Stavanger, Norway | |
| 100m individual medley | 1:02.13 | | Julie-Marie Meynen | SC Le Dauphin Ettelbruck | 12 December 2015 | Luxembourgish Championships | Dudelange, Luxembourg | |
| 200m individual medley | 2:16.63 | | Monique Olivier | Luxembourg | 19 November 2015 | French Championships | Angers, France | |
| 400m individual medley | 4:48.36 | | Monique Olivier | Luxembourg | 22 November 2015 | French Championships | Angers, France | |
| 4×50m freestyle relay | | | | | | | | |
| 4×100m freestyle relay | 3:51.76 | | Monique Olivier (57.30); Sarah Rolko (58.03); Jacqueline Banky (56.72); Laura Vanderschrick (59.71) | Swimming Luxembourg | 2 December 2017 | Luxembourgish Championships | Oberkorn, Luxembourg | |
| 4×200m freestyle relay | 8:32.40 | | Bridget Sullivan (2:07.19); Leni Leonard (2:10.71); Emma Barthel (2:08.38); Lou Jominet (2:06.12) | Luxembourg Sharks | 3 October 2026 | Endurance Challenge | Bonnevoie, Luxembourg | |
| 4×50m medley relay | | | | | | | | |
| 4×100m medley relay | 4:21.28 | | Mara Soffio (1:08.35); Maud Allar (1:11.01); Leeloo Reinesch (1:01.93); Nora Bohler (59.99) | Schwammclub Deifferdang | 1 December 2024 | Luxembourgish Championships | Oberkorn, Luxembourg | |

Legend: # – Record awaiting ratification by FLNS; WR – World record; ER – European record; e – equalled existing record;
Records not set in finals: h – heat; sf – semifinal; r – relay 1st leg; rh – relay heat 1st leg; b – B final; † – en route to final mark; so – swim-off; tt – time trial

=== Mixed relay ===
| Event | Time | | Name | Club | Date | Meet | Location | Ref |
|---|---|---|---|---|---|---|---|---|
| 4×50 m freestyle relay | 1:35.60 | h | Julien Henx (22.45); Max Mannes (22.43); Julie Meynen (25.15); Monique Olivier (25.57) | Luxembourg | 17 December 2021 | World Championships | Abu Dhabi, United Arab Emirates | |
| 4×50 m medley relay | 1:44.31 | h | Sarah Rolko (28.66); Raphaël Stacchiotti (27.26); Julien Henx (23.63); Julie-Marie Meynen (24.76) | Luxembourg | 3 December 2015 | European Championships | Netanya, Israel | |

Legend: # – Record awaiting ratification by FLNS; e – equalled existing record;
Records not set in finals: h – heat; so – swim-off
