= List of Liechtenstein records in swimming =

The Liechtenstein records in swimming are the fastest ever performances of swimmers from Liechtenstein, which are recognised and ratified by the Liechtenstein Swimming Association (LSchV).

All records were set in finals unless noted otherwise.

== Long Course (50 m) ==
=== Men ===
Event	Time		Name	Club	Date	Meet	Location	Ref
50 m freestyle	23.22		Patrick Vetsch	Liechtenstein	30 May 2019	Games of the Small States of Europe	Podgorica, Montenegro	
100 m freestyle	51.20		Patrick Vetsch	Liechtenstein	30 May 2017	Games of the Small States of Europe	Serravalle, San Marino	
200 m freestyle	1:52.51		Patrick Vetsch	Liechtenstein	8 July 2018	Luxembourgish Championships	Luxembourg, Luxembourg	
400 m freestyle	4:01.03		Christoph Meier	Liechtenstein	28 May 2016	-	Bergen, Norway	
800 m freestyle	8:26.31	†	Christoph Meier	Liechtenstein	5 June 2015	Games of the Small States of Europe	Reykjavík, Iceland	
1500 m freestyle	15:55.71		Christoph Meier	Liechtenstein	5 June 2015	Games of the Small States of Europe	Reykjavík, Iceland	
50m backstroke	25.24		Rufus Bernhardt	Unattached	19 July 2026	Florida Summer Senior Championships	Ocala, United States	
100m backstroke	55.50		Rufus Bernhardt	Unattached	18 July 2026	Florida Summer Senior Championships	Ocala, United States	
200m backstroke	2:08.72	b	Fabio Toscan	SV St. Gallen - Wittenbach	12 July 2025	Swiss Summer Championships	Sursee, Switzerland	
50m breaststroke	29.03		Christoph Meier	Liechtenstein	29 May 2016	-	Bergen, Norway	
100m breaststroke	1:02.88		Christoph Meier	Liechtenstein	28 May 2016	-	Bergen, Norway	
200m breaststroke	2:14.65		Christoph Meier	SC Uster Wallisellen	21 March 2019	Swiss Championships	Uster, Switzerland	
50m butterfly	25.79		Patrick Vetsch	Bern Swimming Club	15 December 2018	Christmas Cup	Uster, Switzerland	
100m butterfly	57.36		Patrick Vetsch	Liechtenstein	13 July 2018	Swiss Summer Championships	Aarau, Switzerland	
200m butterfly	2:02.34		Christoph Meier	Liechtenstein	28 May 2019	Games of the Small States of Europe	Podgorica, Montenegro	
200m individual medley	2:02.68	h	Christoph Meier	Liechtenstein	24 July 2019	World Championships	Gwangju, South Korea	
400m individual medley	4:19.19	h	Christoph Meier	Liechtenstein	6 August 2016	Olympic Games	Rio de Janeiro, Brazil	
4×100m freestyle relay	3:41.50		Liechtenstein	2 June 2017	Games of the Small States of Europe	Serravalle, San Marino		
4×200m freestyle relay	8:48.04		T. Gross; Alexander Höpker; T. Mathis; Thomas Wanger	Liechtenstein	26 June 1999	-	Kreuzlingen, Switzerland	
4×100m medley relay	4:01.74		Tarik Hoch (1:04.41); Simon-Aramis Greuter (1:09.48); Christoph Meier (56.88); Patrick Vetsch (50.97)	Liechtenstein	1 June 2017	Games of the Small States of Europe	Serravalle, San Marino	

Legend: # – Record awaiting ratification by LSchV; WR – World record; ER – European record;
Records not set in finals: h – heat; sf – semifinal; r – relay 1st leg; rh – relay heat 1st leg; b – B final; † – en route to final mark; so – swim-off; tt – time trial

=== Women ===
Event	Time		Name	Club	Date	Meet	Location	Ref
50m freestyle	27.08		Julia Hassler	SV Nikar Heidelberg	12 March 2021	SV Nikar Heidelberg Invitation Meet	Heidelberg, Germany	
100m freestyle	57.03		Julia Hassler	SV Nikar Heidelberg	13 March 2021	SV Nikar Heidelberg Invitation Meet	Heidelberg, Germany	
200m freestyle	2:00.28		Julia Hassler	Liechtenstein	25 June 2021	Sette Colli Trophy	Rome, Italy	
400m freestyle	4:06.98	h	Julia Hassler	Liechtenstein	25 July 2021	Olympic Games	Tokyo, Japan	
800m freestyle	8:26.99	h	Julia Hassler	Liechtenstein	29 July 2021	Olympic Games	Tokyo, Japan	
1500m freestyle	16:12.55	h	Julia Hassler	Liechtenstein	26 July 2021	Olympic Games	Tokyo, Japan	
50m backstroke	32.63		Theresa Banzer	Schwimmclub Aquarius Triesen	30 June 2012	Swiss Championships	Nyon, Switzerland	
100m backstroke	1:07.42		Maria Batliner	-	17 July 2009	-	Renens, Switzerland	
200m backstroke	2:29.59		Maria Batliner	-	29 January 2011	-	Enzersdorf, Austria	
50m breaststroke	34.42		Theresa Banzer	Schwimmclub Aquarius Triesen	19 February 2012	-	Montreux, Switzerland	
100m breaststroke	1:13.25		Theresa Banzer	-	11 March 2016	-	Oerlikon, Switzerland	
200m breaststroke	2:34.91		Theresa Banzer	Liechtenstein	29 May 2013	Games of the Small States of Europe	Luxembourg, Luxembourg	
50m butterfly	29.00	h	Theresa Hefel	Liechtenstein	7 July 2018	Luxembourgish Championships	Luxembourg, Luxembourg	
100m butterfly	1:02.27		Julia Hassler	Liechtenstein	29 May 2019	Games of the Small States of Europe	Podgorica, Montenegro	
200m butterfly	2:15.39		Julia Hassler	Liechtenstein	28 May 2019	Games of the Small States of Europe	Podgorica, Montenegro	
200m individual medley	2:23.26		Teresa Banzer	Liechtenstein	2 June 2015	Games of the Small States of Europe	Reykjavík, Iceland	
400m individual medley	4:58.29		Julia Hassler	Liechtenstein	30 May 2019	Games of the Small States of Europe	Podgorica, Montenegro	
4×50m freestyle relay	1:55.09		Laura Manco; Theresa Banzer; Tamara Vetsch; Valentina Banzer	-	27 April 2013	-	Geneva, Switzerland	
4×100m freestyle relay	4:00.94		Jasmin Buechel (1:02.16); Theresa Banzer (59.31); Julia Hassler (57.45); Tamara Vetsch (1:02.02)	Liechtenstein	31 May 2013	Games of the Small States of Europe	Luxembourg, Luxembourg	
4×200m freestyle relay	8:43.34		Celina Kind (2:16.90); Jasmin Büchel (2:13.95); Theresa Banzer (2:08.75); Julia Hassler (2:03.74)	Liechtenstein	29 May 2013	Games of the Small States of Europe	Luxembourg, Luxembourg	
4×50m medley relay	2:21.05		Nora Zenhäusern; Nicole Wenaweser; Nicole Rothmund; Petra Wolfinger	-	3 May 1997	-	Antwerp, Belgium	
4×100m medley relay	4:28.03		Celina Kind (1:10.00); Theresa Banzer (1:13.50); Julia Hassler (1:02.75); Jasmin Büchel (1:01.78)	Liechtenstein	30 May 2013	Games of the Small States of Europe	Luxembourg, Luxembourg	

Legend: # – Record awaiting ratification by LSchV; WR – World record; ER – European record;
Records not set in finals: h – heat; sf – semifinal; r – relay 1st leg; rh – relay heat 1st leg; b – B final; † – en route to final mark; so – swim-off; tt – time trial

== Short Course (25 m) ==
=== Men ===
Event	Time		Name	Club	Date	Meet	Location	Ref
50m freestyle	22.52		Patrick Vetsch	Bern Swimming Club	16 November 2018	Swiss Championships	Uster, Switzerland	
100m freestyle	49.48	h	Patrick Vetsch	Liechtenstein	16 December 2017	European Championships	Copenhagen, Denmark	
200m freestyle	1:48.16		Patrick Vetsch	Schwimmgemeinschaft Liechtenstein	25 November 2017	Swiss Championships	Uster, Switzerland	
400m freestyle	3:48.67		Christoph Meier	Liechtenstein	19 March 2016	-	Lausanne, Switzerland	
800m freestyle	7:59.81	†	Christoph Meier	Liechtenstein	7 December 2014	World Championships	Doha, Qatar	
1500m freestyle	15:09.40		Christoph Meier	Liechtenstein	21 March 2015	-	Lugano, Switzerland	
50m backstroke	26.21		Patrick Vetsch	Bern Swimming Club	16 November 2018	Swiss Championships	Uster, Switzerland	
100m backstroke	56.64	b	Fabio Toscan	SV St.Gallen-Witten	16 November 2024	Swiss Championships	Sursee, Switzerland	
200m backstroke	2:02.86	b	Fabio Toscan	SV St.Gallen-Witten	17 November 2024	Swiss Championships	Sursee, Switzerland	
50m breaststroke	28.71		Christoph Meier	Liechtenstein	21 December 2016	-	Uster, Switzerland	
100m breaststroke	1:01.07		Christoph Meier	Liechtenstein	21 March 2015	-	Lugano, Switzerland	
200m breaststroke	2:10.67		Christoph Meier	Liechtenstein	21 November 2014	-	Uster, Switzerland	
50m butterfly	25.27	b	Patrick Vetsch	Schwimmgemeinschaft Liechtenstein	26 November 2017	Swiss Championships	Uster, Switzerland	
100m butterfly	56.14		Christoph Meier	SC Uster Wallisellen	24 November 2017	Swiss Championships	Uster, Switzerland	
200m butterfly	1:59.55		Christoph Meier	-	21 March 2015	-	Lugano, Switzerland	
100m individual medley	55.46	h	Christoph Meier	Liechtenstein	16 December 2017	European Championships	Copenhagen, Denmark	
200m individual medley	1:58.13	h	Christoph Meier	Liechtenstein	15 December 2017	European Championships	Copenhagen, Denmark	
400m individual medley	4:11.12	h	Christoph Meier	Liechtenstein	14 December 2017	European Championships	Copenhagen, Denmark	
4×50m freestyle relay								
4×100m freestyle relay								
4×200m freestyle relay								
4×50m medley relay								
4×100m medley relay								

Legend: # – Record awaiting ratification by LSchV; WR – World record; ER – European record;
Records not set in finals: h – heat; sf – semifinal; r – relay 1st leg; rh – relay heat 1st leg; b – B final; † – en route to final mark; so – swim-off; tt – time trial

=== Women ===
Event	Time		Name	Club	Date	Meet	Location	Ref
50m freestyle	26.45		Julia Hassler	SV Nikar Heidelberg	19 September 2020	Malbun Championships	Eschen, Liechtenstein	
100m freestyle	55.58		Julia Hassler	Liechtenstein	16 October 2021	International Swim Meet	Saint-Dizier, France	
200m freestyle	1:56.27		Julia Hassler	SV Nikar Heidelberg	15 November 2019	German Championships	Berlin, Germany	
400m freestyle	4:01.09		Julia Hassler	Toronto Titans	9 September 2021	International Swimming League	Naples, Italy	
800m freestyle	8:15.73		Julia Hassler	Liechtenstein	5 December 2019	European Championships	Glasgow, Great Britain	
1500m freestyle	16:11.01		Julia Hassler	SV Nikar Heidelberg	2 February 2020	German Team Championships	Wiesbaden, Germany	
50m backstroke	31.53		Theresa Hefel	Gamprin Swim Team Club	17 November 2018	Cambomare Sprintpokal	Kempten, Switzerland	
100m backstroke	1:03.52		Maria Batliner	SVS Schwimmen	8 November 2009	Austrian Team Championships	Vienna, Austria	
200m backstroke	2:16.64		Maria Batliner	SVS Schwimmen	7 November 2009	Austrian Team Championships	Vienna, Austria	
50m breaststroke	33.94		Theresa Banzer	Liechtenstein	7 November 2015	-	Bolzano, Italy	
100m breaststroke	1:11.97		Theresa Banzer	Region Ostschweiz	15 December 2013	-	Singen, Germany	
200m breaststroke	2:30.39		Theresa Banzer	Schwimmclub Unterland	21 November 2014	Swiss Championships	Uster, Switzerland	
50m butterfly	28.86	b	Theresa Hefel	Schwimmclub Unterland	9 December 2017	5. Int. Oesterr. Kurzbahnstaatsmeisterschaften	Graz, Austria	
100m butterfly	1:01.98		Julia Hassler	SV Nikar Heidelberg	1 February 2020	German Team Championships	Wiesbaden, Germany	
200m butterfly	2:12.90	h	Julia Hassler	Liechtenstein	3 December 2014	World Championships	Doha, Qatar	
100m individual medley	1:05.79		Theresa Banzer	-	17 September 2016	Liechtensteinian Championships	Eschen, Liechtenstein	
200m individual medley	2:19.51		Theresa Banzer	Region Ostschweiz	14 December 2013	-	Singen, Germany	
400m individual medley	4:51.64		Julia Hassler	SC Uster Wallisellen	25 March 2012	Swiss Team Championships	Uster, Switzerland	
4×50m freestyle relay	1:52.88		Laura Manco (28.37); Tamara Vetsch (28.64); Jasmin Büchel (28.45); Theresa Banzer (27.42)	Schwimmclub Aquarius Triesen	27 October 2012	-	Chur, Switzerland	
4×100m freestyle relay	4:08.44		Laura Manco (1:01.04); Jasmin Büchel (1:02.98); Tamara Vetsch (1:02.49); Theresa Banzer (1:01.93)	Schwimmclub Aquarius Triesen	17 December 2011	Liechtensteinian Championships	Eschen, Liechtenstein	
4×200m freestyle relay	9:42.82		Nicole Wenaweser (2:21.31); Petra Wolfinger (2:30.14); Nora Zenhäusern (2:20.88); Nicole Rothmund (2:30.49)	Liechtenstein	20 March 1998	Swiss Championships	Lausanne, Switzerland	
4×50m medley relay	2:06.88		Laura Manco (32.56); Theresa Banzer (35.07); Jasmin Büchel (31.08); Tamara Vetsch (28.17)	Schwimmclub Aquarius Triesen	28 October 2012	-	Chur, Switzerland	
4×100m medley relay	4:55.80		Nora Zenhäusern; Nicole Wenaweser; Nicole Rothmund; Petra Wolfinger	Liechtenstein	7 February 1999	-	Biel, Switzerland	

Legend: # – Record awaiting ratification by LSchV; WR – World record; ER – European record;
Records not set in finals: h – heat; sf – semifinal; r – relay 1st leg; rh – relay heat 1st leg; b – B final; † – en route to final mark; so – swim-off; tt – time trial
