= List of Monegasque records in swimming =

The Monégasque records in swimming are the fastest ever performances of swimmers from Monaco, which are recognised and ratified by the Federation Monegasque de Natation (FMN).

All records were set in finals unless noted otherwise.

== Long Course (50 m) ==
=== Men ===
Event	Time		Name	Club	Date	Meet	Location	Ref
50 m freestyle	22.80		Issei Kim	Monaco	29 May 2025	Games of the Small States of Europe	Andorra la Vella, Andorra	
100 m freestyle	50.86		Gabriel Crassard	Monaco	27 May 2025	Games of the Small States of Europe	Andorra la Vella, Andorra	
200 m freestyle	1:52.21		Gabriel Crassard	Monaco	28 May 2025	Games of the Small States of Europe	Andorra la Vella, Andorra	
400 m freestyle	4:02.23		Theo Druenne	Monaco	31 May 2023	Games of the Small States of Europe	Msida, Malta	
800 m freestyle	8:17.44		Théo Druenne	Monaco	30 May 2023	Games of the Small States of Europe	Msida, Malta	
1500 m freestyle	15:54.67		Théo Druenne	Monaco	2 June 2023	Games of the Small States of Europe	Msida, Malta	
50m backstroke	26.27		Ladislas Salczer	Monaco	30 May 2025	Games of the Small States of Europe	Andorra la Vella, Andorra	
100m backstroke	59.13	r	Andrea Bolognesi	Monaco	4 June 2015	Games of the Small States of Europe	Reykjavík, Iceland	
200m backstroke	2:13.49	b	Noe Druenne	AS Monaco Natation	14 February 2026	Lisbon International Meeting	Lisbon, Portugal	
50m breaststroke	29.53	h	Marcus Sainton	Monaco	2 June 2023	Games of the Small States of Europe	Msida, Malta	
100m breaststroke	1:03.53		Andrea Bolognesi	Monaco	4 June 2015	Games of the Small States of Europe	Reykjavík, Iceland	
200m breaststroke	2:22.75		Francois Xavier Paquot	Monaco	3 June 2015	Games of the Small States of Europe	Reykjavík, Iceland	
50m butterfly	24.09	h	Issei Kim	Monaco	2 June 2023	Games of the Small States of Europe	Msida, Malta	
100m butterfly	55.72		Andrea Bolognesi	Monaco	3 June 2015	Games of the Small States of Europe	Reykjavík, Iceland	
200m butterfly	2:06.77		Filippo Novara	Monaco	2 June 2015	Games of the Small States of Europe	Reykjavík, Iceland	
200m individual medley	2:09.25		Andrea Bolognesi	Monaco	2 June 2015	Games of the Small States of Europe	Reykjavík, Iceland	
400m individual medley	4:44.35		Théo Druenne	Monaco	2 June 2024	Mare Nostrum	Monte Carlo, Monaco	
4×100m freestyle relay	3:29.37		Sott Bole (52.12); Francois Xavier Paquot (52.72); Andrea Bolognesi (51.87); Antonia Sica (52.66)	Monaco	5 June 2015	Games of the Small States of Europe	Reykjavík, Iceland	
4×200m freestyle relay	7:45.19		Gabriel Crassard (1:53.24); Antoine Petit (1:57.04); Theo Druenne (1:56.92); Enzo Oumailia (1:57.99)	Monaco	29 May 2025	Games of the Small States of Europe	Andorra la Vella, Andorra	
4×100m medley relay	3:54.00		Andrea Bolognesi (59.13); Francois Xavier Paquot (1:06.13); Filippo Novara (56.77); Scot Bole (51.97)	Monaco	4 June 2015	Games of the Small States of Europe	Reykjavík, Iceland	

Legend: # – Record awaiting ratification by Federation Monegasque de Natation; WR – World record; ER – European record;
Records not set in finals: h – heat; sf – semifinal; r – relay 1st leg; rh – relay heat 1st leg; b – B final; † – en route to final mark; so – swim-off; tt – time trial

=== Women ===
Event	Time		Name	Club	Date	Meet	Location	Ref
50 m freestyle	27.24		Tiffany Pou	Monaco	4 June 2015	Games of the Small States of Europe	Reykjavík, Iceland	
100 m freestyle	58.21	r	Pauline Viste	Monaco	2 June 2017	Games of the Small States of Europe	Serravalle, San Marino	
200 m freestyle	2:03.28		Giulia Viacava	Monaco	1 June 2023	Games of the Small States of Europe	Msida, Malta	
400 m freestyle	4:18.13	b	Lisa Pou	AS Monaco Natation	16 June 2024	French Championships	Chartres, France	
800 m freestyle	8:44.47		Lisa Pou	AS Monaco Natation	14 February 2026	Lisbon International Meeting	Lisbon, Portugal	
1500 m freestyle	16:41.26		Lisa Pou	AS Monaco Natation	18 June 2024	French Championships	Chartres, France	
50 m backstroke	30.30		Giulia Viacava	Monaco	2 June 2023	Games of the Small States of Europe	Msida, Malta	
100 m backstroke	1:04.23	h	Giulia Viacava	Monaco	31 May 2023	Games of the Small States of Europe	Msida, Malta	
200 m backstroke	2:17.32		Giulia Viacava	Monaco	30 May 2023	Games of the Small States of Europe	Msida, Malta	
50m breaststroke	34.19		Claudia Verdino	Monaco	2 June 2023	Games of the Small States of Europe	Msida, Malta	
100m breaststroke	1:16.16	h	Claudia Verdino	Monaco	1 June 2023	Games of the Small States of Europe	Msida, Malta	
200m breaststroke	2:43.76		Lea Maric	Monaco	31 May 2023	Games of the Small States of Europe	Msida, Malta	
50m butterfly	27.89		Anais Arlandis	Monaco	2 June 2023	Games of the Small States of Europe	Msida, Malta	
100m butterfly	1:02.39		Tiffany Pou	Monaco	31 May 2017	Games of the Small States of Europe	Serravalle, San Marino	
200m butterfly	2:20.93		Tiffany Pou	Monaco	30 May 2017	Games of the Small States of Europe	Serravalle, San Marino	
200m individual medley	2:21.84		Giulia Viacava	Monaco	30 May 2023	Games of the Small States of Europe	Msida, Malta	
400m individual medley	5:00.06		Giulia Viacava	Monaco	2 June 2023	Games of the Small States of Europe	Msida, Malta	
4×100m freestyle relay	3:55.15		Pauline Viste (58.21); Tiffany Pou (57.84); Tifenn Bertaux (58.76); Lauriane Gerbaudo (1:00.34)	Monaco	2 June 2017	Games of the Small States of Europe	Serravalle, San Marino	
4×200m freestyle relay	8:43.84		Giulia Viacava (2:07.35); Eliza Nikandrov (2:14.35); Lisa Pou (2:06.16); Lea Maric (2:15.98)	Monaco	29 May 2025	Games of the Small States of Europe	Andorra la Vella, Andorra	
4×100m medley relay	4:25.70		Giulia Viacava (1:05.24); Claudia Verdino (1:16.67); Anais Arlandis (1:02.80); Pauline Viste (1:00.99)	Monaco	1 June 2023	Games of the Small States of Europe	Msida, Malta	

Legend: # – Record awaiting ratification by Federation Monegasque de Natation; WR – World record; ER – European record;
Records not set in finals: h – heat; sf – semifinal; r – relay 1st leg; rh – relay heat 1st leg; b – B final; † – en route to final mark; so – swim-off; tt – time trial

== Short Course (25 m) ==
=== Men ===
Event	Time	Name	Club	Date	Meet	Location	Ref
50 m freestyle							
100 m freestyle							
200 m freestyle							
400 m freestyle							
800 m freestyle							
1500 m freestyle							
50 m backstroke							
100 m backstroke							
200 m backstroke							
50 m breaststroke							
100 m breaststroke							
200 m breaststroke							
50 m butterfly							
100 m butterfly							
200 m butterfly							
100 m individual medley							
200 m individual medley							
400 m individual medley							
4×50 m freestyle relay							
4×100 m freestyle relay							
4×200 m freestyle relay							
4×50 m medley relay							
4×100 m medley relay							

Legend: # – Record awaiting ratification by Federation Monegasque de Natation; WR – World record; ER – European record;
Records not set in finals: h – heat; sf – semifinal; r – relay 1st leg; rh – relay heat 1st leg; b – B final; † – en route to final mark; so – swim-off; tt – time trial

=== Women ===
Event	Time		Name	Club	Date	Meet	Location	Ref
50 m freestyle								
100 m freestyle								
200 m freestyle	2:02.55	†	Lisa Pou	As Monaco Natation	15 November 2025	Interclub All Categories - Southern Region - Group A	Istres, France	
400 m freestyle	4:10.11		Lisa Pou	As Monaco Natation	15 November 2025	Interclub All Categories - Southern Region - Group A	Istres, France	
800 m freestyle	8:34.75	h	Lisa Pou	Monaco	4 December 2025	European Championships	Lublin, Poland	
1500 m freestyle	16:13.05	h	Lisa Pou	Monaco	6 December 2025	European Championships	Lublin, Poland	
50 m backstroke								
100 m backstroke								
200 m backstroke								
50 m breaststroke								
100 m breaststroke								
200 m breaststroke								
50 m butterfly								
100 m butterfly								
200 m butterfly								
100 m individual medley								
200 m individual medley								
400 m individual medley								
4×50 m freestyle relay								
4×100 m freestyle relay								
4×200 m freestyle relay								
4×50 m medley relay								
4×100 m medley relay								

Legend: # – Record awaiting ratification by Federation Monegasque de Natation; WR – World record; ER – European record;
Records not set in finals: h – heat; sf – semifinal; r – relay 1st leg; rh – relay heat 1st leg; b – B final; † – en route to final mark; so – swim-off; tt – time trial
