= 2023 Games of the Small States of Europe =

Multi-sports event in Europe

XIX Games of the Small States of Europe XIX Logħob tal-Pajjiżi ż-Żgħar tal-Ewropa
- Host city: Valletta
- Country: Malta
- Nations: 9
- Athletes: 835
- Opening: 28 May 2023
- Closing: 3 June 2023
- Website: gssemalta2023.mt

The 2023 Games of the Small States of Europe, also known as the XIX Games of the Small States of Europe or informally Malta 2023 took place in Valletta, Malta from 28 May to 3 June 2023.

Malta previously hosted the 1993 and 2003 editions of the Games. The 2023 installation was originally planned to be the XX Games rather than the XIX Games, but the 2021 edition in Andorra was cancelled due to the COVID-19 pandemic.

== Bid and preparation ==
In February 2017, Julian Pace Bonello, the president of the Maltese Olympic Committee (MOC), announced that Malta would bid for the 2023 Games.

In June 2021, after the Games in Andorra had been cancelled, Marti Mandinco, the president of the Andorran Olympic Committee, handed over the presidency of the Games to Bonello.

In February 2022, the MOC officially launched the Games with Bonello saying he hoped the event would "make the country proud" and "serve as a catalyst to inspire young athletes". Malta hosted the Games of the Small States of Europe Assembly in June 2022, approving the final sports programme for the Games. The Maltese government committed to supporting the games and Maltese athletes with €5 million worth of funding through Sport Malta.

=== Logo and mascot ===
In December 2021, the MOC and the Ministry for Education's Centre for Physical Education and Sport launched a design competition for the Games' logo and mascot, open to children aged 10 to 18. Drawing inspiration from submissions, the logo was then designed by Concept Stadium and unveiled in June 2022 by Clifton Grima, the Minister for Education, Sports, Youth, Research and Innovation. The logo was said to "[merge] the famous Olympic rings with the sea, fish and a Maltese icon recognized by many – the eye symbol". The eye symbol is present in several different parts of Maltese culture, such as charms against the evil eye or as a mark of spiritual identity on the luzzu (a traditional Maltese fishing boat), or on 'Il-Gardjola' (a distinctive watchtower in Senglea) representing guardianship and observance. The logo's overlapping colours represent "Malta's values of diversity and inclusion".

== Development and preparation ==
=== Venues ===
Sport/Event	Venues	City/Locality
Athletics	Matthew Micallef St. John Stadium	Marsa
Basketball	Ta’Qali Basketball Stadium	Ta' Qali
Judo	National Sports School	Pembroke
Rugby sevens	Hibernians Stadium	Paola
Sailing	Gillieru	St. Paul's Bay
Table Tennis	University Sports Hall	Msida
Shooting	Kirkop Sports Complex	Kirkop
Swimming	National Swimming Pool Complex Tal Qroqq	Msida
Tennis	Marsa Sports Club	Marsa
Squash	Marsa Sports Club	Marsa

== Games ==
=== Participating teams ===
- Andorra (details) (98)
- Cyprus (details) (188)
- Iceland (details) (73)
- Liechtenstein (details) (19)
- Luxembourg (details) (130)
- Malta (details) (215)
- Monaco (details) (98)
- Montenegro (details) (61)
- San Marino (details) (51)

=== Sports ===
The following competitions are expected to take place:

2023 Games of the Small States of Europe Sports Programme
- Athletics
- Basketball
- Judo
- Rugby sevens
- Sailing
- Shooting
- Squash
- Swimming
- Table tennis
- Tennis

=== Calendar ===
OC	Opening ceremony	●	Event competitions	1	Event finals	CC	Closing ceremony

May / June	29 Mon	30 Tue	31 Wed	1 Thu	2 Fri	3 Sat	Total
Ceremonies	OC					CC	
Athletics		10		12		12	34
Basketball	●	●	●	2	●	2	4
Judo		11		2			13
Rugby			●		2		2
Sailing		●	●	●	●	7	7
Shooting		●	4	1	2	1	8
Squash	●	2	●	1	2	1	6
Swimming		12	10	8	10		40
Table tennis		●	2	2	●	2	6
Tennis	●	●	●	●	3	2	5
Total events		35	16	28	19	27	125
May / June	29 Mon	30 Tue	31 Wed	1 Thu	2 Fri	3 Sat	Total

== Medal table ==
* Host nation (Malta)

Rank	Nation	Gold	Silver	Bronze	Total
1	Malta*	38	30	29	97
2	Cyprus	30	28	29	87
3	Luxembourg	16	22	28	66
4	Monaco	13	8	12	33
5	Iceland	11	13	18	42
6	San Marino	6	9	7	22
7	Montenegro	5	6	8	19
8	Andorra	4	7	10	21
9	Liechtenstein	2	2	5	9
Totals (9 entries)		125	125	146	396

== Medalists ==
=== Basketball ===
Event	Gold	Silver	Bronze
Men's 5×5	Luxembourg; Mihailo Andjelkovic; Malcolm Mandela Carreira; Lou Demuth; Ivan Do; Xavier Robert Francois; Thomas Grün; Philippe Gutenkauf; Joe Kalmes; Alex Laurent; Clancy Rugg; Oliver Vujakovic; Derek Wilson	Malta; David Bugeja; Kurt Cassar; Samuel Deguara; Aaron Falzon; Tevin Falzon; Alec Felice; Ian Felice Pace; Jacob Formosa; Nelson Kahler; Joshua Tomasi; Eric Washington; Nathan Xuereb	Cyprus; Stefanos Iliadis; Aeneas Jung; Michalis Koumis; Christos Lozides; Roberto Alexander Mantovani; Kyprianos Ioannis Maragkos; Panagiotis Markou; Zayd Muosa; Ioannis Pasiali; Konstantinos Simitzis; Nikolaos Stylianou; Filippos Tigkas
Women's 5×5	Montenegro; Maja Bigović; Milena Jakšić; Milica Jovanović; Bojana Kovačević; Marija Leković; Božica Mujović; Zorana Radonjić; Ksenija Ščepanović; Jelena Vučetić; Lana Vukčević; Sofija Živaljević; Dragana Živković	Luxembourg; Charlie Bidinger; Amanda Brooke Cahill; Kyra Coulon; Faith Ehi Etute; Mandy Geniets; Liz Irthum; Magaly Meynadier; Jo Oly; Anne Simon; Esmeralda Skrijelj; Julija Vujakovic; Cathrin Wolff	Cyprus; Veatriki Akathiotou; Styliana Velinova Chenaklieva; Stefania Georgiou; Andriana Kasapi; Rafaelia Melissa Kasini; Ioanna Kyprionou; Cassidy Rose Mihalko; Petra Orlovic; Marissa Ariella Pangalos; Eleni Pilakouta; Tijana Raja; Sofia Stylianidi
Men's 3×3	Cyprus; Andreas Chimonas; Marios Georgiou; Michalis Mythillos; Georgios Tretiakov	Luxembourg; Sam Ferreira; Christophe Laures; Scott Morton; Victor Stein	Andorra; Bruno Bartolome; Josep Oriol Fernandez; Sergi Marin; Daniel Mofreita
Women's 3×3	Luxembourg; Lisa Jablonowski; Nadia Mossong; Cathy Schmit; Bridget Yoerger	Andorra; Cristina Andres; Claudia Brunet; Laura Laurent; Julia Marquez	Cyprus; Emmelia Georgiou; Katerina Kontou; Panayiota Kyriakou; Anthia Papadouri

=== Judo ===
Event	Gold	Silver	Bronze
Men's 60 kg	Petros Christodoulides; Cyprus	James Zahra; Malta	Manuel Tischhauser; Liechtenstein
Men's 66 kg	Georgios Balarjishvili; Cyprus	Emil Sinanović; Montenegro	Tristan Frei; Liechtenstein
Men's 66 kg	Georgios Balarjishvili; Cyprus	Emil Sinanović; Montenegro	Tom Schmit; Luxembourg
Men's 73 kg	Kyprianos Andreou; Cyprus	Cédric Bessi; Monaco	Claudio Nunes; Luxembourg
Men's 73 kg	Kyprianos Andreou; Cyprus	Cédric Bessi; Monaco	Panagiotis Shakos; Cyprus
Men's 81 kg	Nikola Gardasević; Montenegro	Marc-Elie Gnamien; Monaco	Odysseas Georgakis; Cyprus
Men's 81 kg	Nikola Gardasević; Montenegro	Marc-Elie Gnamien; Monaco	Petros Kesov; Cyprus
Men's 90 kg	Aristos Michael; Cyprus	Paolo Persoglia; San Marino	Árni Lund; Iceland
Men's 90 kg	Aristos Michael; Cyprus	Paolo Persoglia; San Marino	Valerian Ogbaidze; Malta
Men's 100 kg	Georgios Kroussaniotakis; Cyprus	Danilo Pantić; Montenegro	Isaac Bezzina; Malta
Men's 100 kg	Georgios Kroussaniotakis; Cyprus	Danilo Pantić; Montenegro	Egill Blöndal; Iceland
Men's +100 kg	Giannis Antoniou; Cyprus	Marvin Gadeau; Monaco	Nick Kunnert; Luxembourg
Men's +100 kg	Giannis Antoniou; Cyprus	Marvin Gadeau; Monaco	Karl Stefánsson; Iceland
Women's 48 kg	Katryna Esposito; Malta	Veronika Kalaitsidou; Cyprus	Marina Kyprianou; Cyprus
Women's 52 kg	Sofia Asvesta; Cyprus	Yamina Sarah Allag; Monaco	Adamantia Christodoulidou; Cyprus
Women's 52 kg	Sofia Asvesta; Cyprus	Yamina Sarah Allag; Monaco	Milana Stevanović; Montenegro
Women's 63 kg	Rania Drid; Monaco	Anetta Mosr; Luxembourg	Diana Dimitriou; Cyprus
Women's 63 kg	Rania Drid; Monaco	Anetta Mosr; Luxembourg	Tamara Gardasević; Montenegro
Women's 70 kg	Florine Soula; Monaco	Ivana Sunjević; Montenegro	Mareen Hollenstein; Liechtenstein
Women's 70 kg	Florine Soula; Monaco	Ivana Sunjević; Montenegro	Jessica Zannoni; San Marino
Men's team	Cyprus; Kyprianos Andreou; Giannis Antoniou; Georgios Balarjishvili; Petros Christodoulides; Odysseas Georgakis; Georgios Kroussaniotakis	Luxembourg; Bilgee Bayanaa; Nick Kunnert; Claudio Nunes; Tom Schmit	Monaco; Marc-Elie Gnamien; Nicolas Grinda; Abdesalem Khiri; Louis Lallau; Benjamin Scariot; Franck Vatan
Men's team	Cyprus; Kyprianos Andreou; Giannis Antoniou; Georgios Balarjishvili; Petros Christodoulides; Odysseas Georgakis; Georgios Kroussaniotakis	Luxembourg; Bilgee Bayanaa; Nick Kunnert; Claudio Nunes; Tom Schmit	Montenegro; Nikola Gardasević; Danilo Pantić; Emil Sinanović
Women's team	Montenegro; Tamara Gardasević; Milana Stevanović; Ivana Sunjević	Luxembourg; Monique Kedinger; Anetta Mosr; Lena Schmit	Cyprus; Sofia Asvesta; Diana Dimitriou; Charis Iordanou; Veronika Kalaitsidou; Zanet Michaelidou
Women's team	Montenegro; Tamara Gardasević; Milana Stevanović; Ivana Sunjević	Luxembourg; Monique Kedinger; Anetta Mosr; Lena Schmit	Monaco; Yamina Sarah Allag; Rania Drid; Margaux Gonella; Florine Soula

=== Rugby sevens ===
Event	Gold	Silver	Bronze
Men	Luxembourg; Hugo Bertani; Liam Carroll; Matteo Franzina; Fintan Lawlor Jr; Adrian Mendez Elola; Louis Mousel; Christian Olsen; Gael Pujadas; Chobe Sweetnam; Gabriel Vai; Rhys Williams; Luca Zanette	Malta; Michael Banks; Mariano Cutajar; Brendan Dalton; Jeremy Debattista; Christopher Dudman; Joel Farquharson; Zarrin Galea; Josh Gatt; Robert Holloway; Thomas Holloway; Jon Micallef; Jean Scholey; Jethro Zammit	Andorra; Josep Arasanz; Adria Bonell; Galdric Calvet; Adria Calvo; Marti Casals; Storm Fachaux; Samuel Franekn; Pau Gallardo; Leon Laguerre; Aymar Ponsolle; Nil Tome; Thibaut Trape
Women	Andorra; Mariona Barcons; Chiara Cerqueda; Anna Fornsubira; Mireia Galiano; Carla Micas; Cristina Modesto; Lea Mora; Nadia Olm; Celia Palumbo; Noelia Pauls; Noa Sanchez; Zoe Sanchez	Malta; Marion Azzopardi; Myra Bonello; Rodianne Bugeja; Denise Camilleri; Sairita Cassar; Caroline Gafa'; Christina Galea; Jacqueline Richard; Penelope Saverton; Francesca Schembri; Donevellon Sladden; Maria Spiteri; Tessabelle Sultana	Montenegro; Anđela Andrić; Maja Baosic; Ivana Čađenović; Zorica Kostić; Dragica Kovačević; Aleksandra Lukačević; Katarina Martinović; Olivera Mišković; Auset Nehesi Mitchell; Marija Rašović; Saba Sekulović; Amina Tukić

=== Sailing ===
Event	Gold	Silver	Bronze
Men's optimist senior	Timmy Vassallo; Malta	Jonas Micallef; Malta	Matthias Spiteri; Malta
Men's ILCA 4	Noah Garcia; Monaco	Jake Mallia; Malta	Benjamin Vassallo; Malta
Men's ILCA 6	Emilios Max Boeros; Cyprus	Charis Nikolaou; Cyprus	Georgios Yiasemides; Cyprus
Men's ILCA 7	Milivoj Dukić; Montenegro	Ilija Marković; Montenegro	Alexander Denisiuc; Malta
Women's optimist senior	Emily Fenech; Malta	Aleksandra Nagrudnaya; Malta	Katrina Briffa; Malta
Women's ILCA 4	Katrina Micallef; Malta	Andriani Georgiu; Cyprus	Mia Busuttil; Malta
Women's ILCA 6	Marilena Makri; Cyprus	Lacey Aquilina; Malta	Michela Mifsud; Malta

=== Squash ===
Event	Gold	Silver	Bronze
Men's singles	David Maier; Liechtenstein	Luca Wilhelmi; Liechtenstein	Kijan Sultana; Malta
Women's singles	Colette Sultana; Malta	Lijana Sultana; Malta	Sandra Denis; Luxembourg
Men's doubles	Malta; Bradley Hindle; Kijan Sultana	Malta; Niall Engerer; Daniel Zammit-Lewis	Luxembourg; Mark Radley; Amir Samimi
Women's doubles	Malta; Colette Sultana; Lijana Sultana	Malta; Johanna Rizzo; Amke Fischer	Luxembourg; Sandra Denis; Michele Meyer
Mixed doubles	Malta; Niall Engerer; Colette Sultana	Malta; Kijan Sultana; Lijana Sultana	Luxembourg; Miguel Duarte; Sandra Denis
Men's team	Malta; Niall Engerer; Dean Gera; Bradley Hindle; Kresten Hougaard; Julian Scerri; Duncan Stahl; Kijan Sultana; Daniel Zammit-Lewis	Liechtenstein; David Maier; Patrick Maier; Peter Maier; Marcel Rothmund; Alois Widmann; Luca Wilhelmi	Luxembourg; Miguel Duarte; Kyllian Hebbelinck; Daniel Hutchines; Guillaume Plancke; Mark Radley; Amir Samimi

=== Swimming ===
Men

Event	Gold	Silver	Bronze
50 m freestyle	Kyle Micallef; Malta	Rémi Fabiani; Luxembourg	Issei Kim; Monaco
100 m freestyle	Nikolas Antoniou; Cyprus	Rémi Fabiani; Luxembourg	Ralph Daleiden-Ciuferri; Luxembourg
200 m freestyle	Pit Brandenburger; Luxembourg	Max Mannes; Luxembourg	Loris Bianchi; San Marino
400 m freestyle	Loris Bianchi; San Marino	Pit Brandenburger; Luxembourg	Dylan Cachia; Malta
800 m freestyle	Théo Druenne; Monaco	Loris Bianchi; San Marino	Dylan Cachia; Malta
1500 m freestyle	Théo Druenne; Monaco	Loris Bianchi; San Marino	Dylan Cachia; Malta
50 m backstroke	Rémi Fabiani; Luxembourg	Filippos Iakovidis; Cyprus	Max Mannes; Luxembourg
100 m backstroke	Rémi Fabiani; Luxembourg	Filippos Iakovidis; Cyprus	Max Mannes; Luxembourg
200 m backstroke	Max Mannes; Luxembourg	Antonio Nikolaou; Cyprus	Thomas Wareing; Malta
50 m breaststroke	Panayiotis Panaretos; Cyprus	Snorri Einarsson; Iceland	Daði Björnsson; Iceland
100 m breaststroke	Anton McKee; Iceland	Panayiotis Panaretos; Cyprus	Joao Reisen; Luxembourg
200 m breaststroke	Anton McKee; Iceland	Giacomo Casadei; San Marino	Panayiotis Panaretos; Cyprus
50 m butterfly	Julien Henx; Luxembourg	Issei Kim; Monaco	Bernat Lomero; Andorra
50 m butterfly	Julien Henx; Luxembourg	Issei Kim; Monaco	Tomas Lomero; Andorra
50 m butterfly	Julien Henx; Luxembourg	Issei Kim; Monaco	Loukas Marinos; Cyprus
100 m butterfly	Loukas Marinos; Cyprus	Simon Statkevičius; Iceland	Ralph Daleiden-Ciuferri; Luxembourg
200 m butterfly	Florian Frippiat; Luxembourg	Alessandro Rebosio; San Marino	João Reisen; Luxembourg
200 m individual medley	Birnir Hálfdánarson; Iceland	João Reisen; Luxembourg	Florian Frippiat; Luxembourg
400 m individual medley	Anton McKee; Iceland	Thomas Wareing; Malta	João Reisen; Luxembourg
4 × 100 m freestyle relay	Malta; Matthew Galea; Kyle Micallef; Rudi Spiteri; Raoul Stafrace	Iceland; Birnir Hálfdánarson; Guðmundur Rafnsson; Ymir Solvason; Simon Statkevičius	Andorra; Bernat Lomero; Tomas Lomero; Patrick Pelegrina; Kevin Teixeira
4 × 200 m freestyle relay	Luxembourg; Pit Brandenburger; Ralph Daleiden-Ciuferri; Florian Frippiat; Max Mannes	Cyprus; Nikolas Antoniou; Christos Manoli; Loukas Marinos; Stavros Tzirtzipis	Iceland; Birnir Hálfdánarson; Anton McKee; Veigar Sigþórsson; Ymir Solvason
4 × 100 m medley relay	Luxembourg; Ralph Daleiden-Ciuferri; Rémi Fabiani; Julien Henx; João Reisen	Cyprus; Nikolas Antoniou; Filippos Iakovidis; Loukas Marinos; Panayiotis Panaretos	Iceland; Anton McKee; Guðmundur Rafnsson; Ymir Solvason; Simon Statkevičius

Women

Event	Gold	Silver	Bronze
50 m freestyle	Kalia Antoniou; Cyprus	Johanna Guðmundsdóttir; Iceland	Anna Hadjiloizou; Cyprus
100 m freestyle	Kalia Antoniou; Cyprus	Snæfríður Jórunnardóttir; Iceland	Anna Hadjiloizou; Cyprus
200 m freestyle	Snæfríður Jórunnardóttir; Iceland	Kalia Antoniou; Cyprus	Giulia Viacava; Monaco
400 m freestyle	Snæfríður Jórunnardóttir; Iceland	Arianna Valloni; San Marino	Sasha Gatt; Malta
800 m freestyle	Arianna Valloni; San Marino	Sasha Gatt; Malta	Freyja Birkisdóttir; Iceland
1500 m freestyle	Arianna Valloni; San Marino	Sasha Gatt; Malta	Freyja Birkisdóttir; Iceland
50 m backstroke	Kalia Antoniou; Cyprus	Steingerður Hauksdóttir; Iceland	Giulia Viacava; Monaco
100 m backstroke	Georgia Bohl; Malta	Maria Erokhina; Cyprus	Birgitta Ingólfsdóttir; Iceland
200 m backstroke	Giulia Viacava; Monaco	Ylfa Kristmannsdóttir; Iceland	Victoria Balderacchi; Malta
50 m breaststroke	Georgia Bohl; Malta	Maria Erokhina; Cyprus	Birgitta Ingólfsdóttir; Iceland
100 m breaststroke	Georgia Bohl; Malta	Maria Erokhina; Cyprus	Birgitta Ingólfsdóttir; Iceland
200 m breaststroke	Maria Erokhina; Cyprus	Georgia Bohl; Malta	Nadia Tudo; Andorra
50 m butterfly	Snæfríður Jórunnardóttir; Iceland	Kalia Antoniou; Cyprus	Johanna Guðmundsdóttir; Iceland
100 m butterfly	Anna Hadjiloizou; Cyprus	Vala Cicero; Iceland	Anaïs Arlandis; Monaco
200 m butterfly	Agathi Manoli; Cyprus	Sarah Demicoli; Malta	Kristin Hákonardóttir; Iceland
200 m individual medley	Eva Falsdóttir; Iceland	Nadia Tudo; Andorra	Giulia Viacava; Monaco
400 m individual medley	Giulia Viacava; Monaco	Eva Falsdóttir; Iceland	Vala Cicero; Iceland
4 × 100 m freestyle relay	Iceland; Vala Cicero; Johanna Guðmundsdóttir; Kristin Hákonardóttir; Snæfríður Jórunnardóttir	Cyprus; Christina Agiomamitou; Kalia Antoniou; Anna Hadjiloizou; Chrysoula Karamanou	Monaco; Anaïs Arlandis; Tiffany Pou; Giulia Viacava; Pauline Viste
4 × 200 m freestyle relay	Iceland; Freyja Birkisdóttir; Vala Cicero; Kristin Hákonardóttir; Snæfríður Jórunnardóttir	Malta; Mya Azzopardi; Sarah Demicoli; Francesca Falzon Young; Sasha Gatt	Luxembourg; Jacqueline Banky; Lou Jominet; Leeloo Reinesch; Sarah Rolko
4 × 100 m medley relay	Cyprus; Kalia Antoniou; Maria Erokhina; Anna Hadjiloizou; Maria Panaretou	Iceland; Vala Cicero; Birgitta Ingólfsdóttir; Snæfríður Jórunnardóttir; Ylfa Kristmannsdóttir	Malta; Mya Azzopardi; Victoria Balderacchi; Georgia Bohl; Nirvana Micallef

=== Table tennis ===
Event	Gold	Silver	Bronze
Men's singles	Felix Wetzel; Malta	Eric Glod; Luxembourg	Luka Mladenovic; Luxembourg
Men's singles	Felix Wetzel; Malta	Eric Glod; Luxembourg	Filip Radović; Montenegro
Women's singles	Xiaoxin Yang; Monaco	Camella Iacob; Malta	Renáta Štrbíková; Malta
Women's singles	Xiaoxin Yang; Monaco	Camella Iacob; Malta	Ariel Barbosa; Luxembourg
Men's doubles	Luxembourg; Luka Mladenovic; Eric Glod	Malta; Felix Wetzel; Dimitrij Prokopcov	San Marino; Mattias Mongiusti; Lorenzo Ragni
Men's doubles	Luxembourg; Luka Mladenovic; Eric Glod	Malta; Felix Wetzel; Dimitrij Prokopcov	Montenegro; Filip Radović; Filip Radulović
Women's doubles	Malta; Camella Iacob; Renáta Štrbíková	Luxembourg; Ariel Barbosa; Tessy Gonderinger	Monaco; Sannah Lagsir; Xiaoxin Yang
Women's doubles	Malta; Camella Iacob; Renáta Štrbíková	Luxembourg; Ariel Barbosa; Tessy Gonderinger	Montenegro; Simona Perović; Ivona Petrić
Men's team	Malta; Daniel Bajada; Gabriel Grixti; Dimitrij Prokopcov; Felix Wetzel	Luxembourg; Eric Glod; Luka Mladenovic; Eric Thillen; Xia Cheng	Cyprus; Sharpel Elia; Hristo Hristonov; Christos Savva; Marios Yiangou
Men's team	Malta; Daniel Bajada; Gabriel Grixti; Dimitrij Prokopcov; Felix Wetzel	Luxembourg; Eric Glod; Luka Mladenovic; Eric Thillen; Xia Cheng	San Marino; Federico Giardi; Mattias Mongiusti; Lorenzo Ragni
Women's team	Malta; Anthea Cutajar; Camella Iacob; Viktoria Lucenkova; Renáta Štrbíková	Monaco; Sannah Lagsir; Anne Ulrika Qvist; Xiaoxin Yang	Cyprus; Georgia Avraam; Foteini Meletie; Konstantina Meletie
Women's team	Malta; Anthea Cutajar; Camella Iacob; Viktoria Lucenkova; Renáta Štrbíková	Monaco; Sannah Lagsir; Anne Ulrika Qvist; Xiaoxin Yang	Luxembourg; Ariel Barbosa; Tessy Gonderinger; Ni Xiaojing; Julie Poncin
