= Swimming at the 2019 Games of the Small States of Europe =

- Venue: Morača Sports Center
- Location: (Montenegro) Podgorica
- Dates: 28–30 May
- Competitors: 112 from 9 nations

Swimming at the 2019 Games of the Small States of Europe was held from 28 to 30 May 2019 at the Morača Sports Center, Podgorica.

== Medal table ==
Rank	Nation	Gold	Silver	Bronze	Total
1	Luxembourg	15	11	5	31
2	Iceland	9	2	10	21
3	Liechtenstein	7	5	1	13
4	Monaco	6	4	9	19
5	Cyprus	2	8	2	12
6	Andorra	1	0	5	6
7	Malta	0	5	5	10
8	San Marino	0	1	1	2
Totals (8 entries)		40	36	38	114

== Medalists ==
=== Men ===
Event	Gold		Silver		Bronze	
50 m freestyle	Julien Henx; Luxembourg	23.14	shared gold		Dadó Fenrir Jasminuson; Iceland	23.15
50 m freestyle	Omiros Zagkas; Cyprus	23.14	shared gold		Dadó Fenrir Jasminuson; Iceland	23.15
100 m freestyle	Julien Henx; Luxembourg	51.05	Harry Stacey; Malta	51.10	Pit Brandenburger; Luxembourg	51.15
200 m freestyle	Pit Brandenburger; Luxembourg	1:52.60	Patrick Vetsch; Liechtenstein	1:55.77	Þröstur Bjarnason; Iceland	1:56.59
400 m freestyle	Pit Brandenburger; Luxembourg	3:56.17 GR	Adib Khalil; Monaco	4:05.96	Jacques Schmitz; Luxembourg	4:06.29
1500 m freestyle	Pit Brandenburger; Luxembourg	15:47.49 GR	Adib Khalil; Monaco	16:09.54	Loris Bianchi; San Marino	16:21.76
50 m backstroke	Kolbeinn Hrafnkelsson; Iceland	26.33 GR	shared gold		Kristinn Þórarinsson; Iceland	26.63
50 m backstroke	Raphaël Stacchiotti; Luxembourg	26.33 GR	shared gold		Kristinn Þórarinsson; Iceland	26.63
100 m backstroke	Raphaël Stacchiotti; Luxembourg	56.95	Filippos Iakovidis; Cyprus	57.22	Kristinn Þórarinsson; Iceland	57.39
200 m backstroke	Raphaël Stacchiotti; Luxembourg	2:05.03	Rémi Fabiani; Luxembourg	2:06.71	Romain Vanmoen; Monaco	2:08.34
50 m breaststroke	Anton Sveinn McKee; Iceland	27.93 GR	Omiros Zagkas; Cyprus	28.86	Christoph Meier; Liechtenstein	29.35
100 m breaststroke	Anton Sveinn McKee; Iceland	1:00.33 GR	Christoph Meier; Liechtenstein	1:03.93	Marcus Sainton; Monaco	1:04.10
200 m breaststroke	Anton Sveinn McKee; Iceland	2:10.41 GR	Christoph Meier; Liechtenstein	2:16.71	Marcus Sainton; Monaco	2:17.72
50 m butterfly	Julien Henx; Luxembourg	24.30 GR	Andrew Chetcuti; Malta	24.61	Bernat Lomero; Andorra	25.27
100 m butterfly	Raphaël Stacchiotti; Luxembourg	55.07	Julien Henx; Luxembourg	55.35	Mikhail Umnov; Malta	56.07
200 m butterfly	Christoph Meier; Liechtenstein	2:02.34 GR	Joao Carneiro; Luxembourg	2:06.04	Mikhail Umnov; Malta	2:07.65
200 m individual medley	Raphaël Stacchiotti; Luxembourg	2:03.11	Christoph Meier; Liechtenstein	2:04.31	Thomas Tsiopanis; Cyprus	2:06.79
400 m individual medley	Raphaël Stacchiotti; Luxembourg	4:24.33	Christoph Meier; Liechtenstein	4:30.27	Joao Carneiro; Luxembourg	4:37.78
4 × 100 m freestyle relay	Luxembourg; Julien Henx (51.95); Bob Sauber (52.73); Pit Brandenburger (51.08); Raphaël Stacchiotti (50.67)	3:26.43	Malta; Matthew Galea (53.30); Harry Stacey (50.65); Andrew Chetcuti (51.34); Dylan Cachia (53.38)	3:28.67	Iceland; Kristinn Þórarinsson (52.36); Kristofer Sigurðsson (52.17); Kolbeinn Hrafnkelsson (53.42); Dadó Fenrir Jasminuson (51.65)	3:29.60
4 × 200 m freestyle relay	Luxembourg; Rémi Fabiani (1:54.99); Jacques Schmitz (1:56.40); Pit Brandenburger (1:52.96); Raphaël Stacchiotti (1:56.40)	7:40.75	Malta; Andrew Chetcuti (1:57.57); Harry Stacey (1:54.30); Matthew Galea (1:56.89); Dylan Cachia (1:57.56)	7:46.32	Iceland; Þröstur Bjarnason (1:56.61); Kristinn Þórarinsson (1:55.77); Kristofer Sigurðsson (1:58.32); Patrik Viggó Vilbergsson (1:57.51)	7:48.21
4 × 100 m medley relay	Iceland; Kristinn Þórarinsson (58.19); Anton Sveinn McKee (59.87); Dadó Fenrir Jasminuson (57.29); Kristofer Sigurðsson (51.28)	3:46.63	Luxembourg; Rémi Fabiani (58.87); Raphaël Stacchiotti (1:02.80); Julien Henx (55.59); Pit Brandenburger (50.71)	3:47.97	Cyprus; Filippos Iakovidis (56.75); Panayiotis Panaretos (1:04.97); Zacharias Pavlou (56.69); Omiros Zagkas (51.32)	3:49.73

=== Women ===
Event	Gold		Silver		Bronze	
50 m freestyle	Cassandra Petit; Monaco	25.78	Kalia Antoniou; Cyprus	26.01	Jóhanna Elín Guðmundsdóttir; Iceland	26.15
100 m freestyle	Cassandra Petit; Monaco	56.40	Kalia Antoniou; Cyprus	56.83	Pauline Viste; Monaco	57.72
200 m freestyle	Julia Hassler; Liechtenstein	2:01.58	Monique Olivier; Luxembourg	2:02.79	Cassandra Petit; Monaco	2:05.54
400 m freestyle	Julia Hassler; Liechtenstein	4:15.18	Monique Olivier; Luxembourg	4:18.63	Lisa Pou; Monaco	4:22.24
800 m freestyle	Julia Hassler; Liechtenstein	8:46.60	Arianna Valloni; San Marino	8:54.84	Lisa Pou; Monaco	8:56.09
50 m backstroke	Eygló Ósk Gústafsdóttir; Iceland	29.46	Sarah Rolko; Luxembourg	30.22	Mónica Ramírez; Andorra	30.28
100 m backstroke	Eygló Ósk Gústafsdóttir; Iceland	1:02.02	Sarah Rolko; Luxembourg	1:04.36	Mónica Ramírez; Andorra	1:05.99
200 m backstroke	Eygló Ósk Gústafsdóttir; Iceland	2:17.36	Sarah Rolko; Luxembourg	2:19.89	Lisa Pou; Monaco	2:21.25
50 m breaststroke	Cassandra Petit; Monaco	33.62	Alexandra McGonigle; Malta	33.91	Nàdia Tudó; Andorra	33.94
100 m breaststroke	Nàdia Tudó; Andorra	1:12.86	Karen Mist Arngeirsdóttir; Iceland	1:13.96	Sunna Svanlaug Vilhjálmsdóttir; Iceland	1:14.48
200 m breaststroke	Isabella Ioannou; Cyprus	2:37.95	Karen Mist Arngeirsdóttir; Iceland	2:38.69	Nàdia Tudó; Andorra	2:39.19
50 m butterfly	Cassandra Petit; Monaco	27.76 GR	Alexandra Schegoleva; Cyprus	28.14	Jóhanna Elín Guðmundsdóttir; Iceland	28.31
100 m butterfly	Julia Hassler; Liechtenstein	1:02.27	Lena Peters; Luxembourg	1:02.54	Cassandra Petit; Monaco	1:02.86
200 m butterfly	Julia Hassler; Liechtenstein	2:15.39 GR	Monique Olivier; Luxembourg	2:18.30	Lena Peters; Luxembourg	2:21.76
200 m individual medley	Cassandra Petit; Monaco	2:21.38	Alexandra Schegoleva; Cyprus	2:21.44	Mya Azzopardi; Malta	2:21.58
400 m individual medley	Julia Hassler; Liechtenstein	4:58.29	Lisa Pou; Monaco	4:58.95	María Fanney Kristjánsdóttir; Iceland	5:04.39
4 × 100 m freestyle relay	Monaco; Pauline Viste (57.45); Laëticia Antunes Da Costa (58.59); Cassandra Petit (57.41); Tifeen Bertaux (59.88)	3:53.33	Cyprus; Kalia Antoniou (57.41); Christalla Papadopoulou (1:00.24); Ioli Nikolaidou (59.39); Tonia Papapetrou (59.01)	3:56.05	Malta; Mya Azzopardi (58.93); Francesca Falzon Young (59.61); Martina Valletta (1:00.51); Michelle Van Rooyen (58.56)	3:57.61
4 × 200 m freestyle relay	Luxembourg; Monique Olivier (2:02.70); Jacqueline Banky (2:08.85); Emma Peters (2:09.15); Lou Jominet (2:09.68)	8:30.38	Monaco; Laëticia Antunes Da Costa (2:09.45); Pauline Viste (2:09.81); Lisa Pou (2:07.71); Cassandra Petit (2:04.77)	8:31.74	Malta; Mya Azzopardi (2:07.20); Michelle Van Rooyen (2:05.51); Sasha Gatt (2:12.36); Francesca Falzon Young (2:07.37)	8:32.44
4 × 100 m medley relay	Iceland; Eygló Ósk Gústafsdóttir (1:02.79); Karen Mist Arngeirsdóttir (1:13.85); Katarína Róbertsdóttir (1:05.26); Jóhanna Elin Guðmundsdóttir (58.26)	4:20.16	Cyprus; Ioli Nikolaidou (1:08.25); Isabella Ioannou (1:16.08); Alexandra Schegoleva (1:02.72); Kalia Antoniou (56.73)	4:23.78	Luxembourg; Sarah Rolko (1:05.03); Neele Albers (1:18.68); Emma Peters (1:03.39); Monique Olivier (57.00)	4:24.10
