= Shooting at the 2023 Games of the Small States of Europe =

- Location: (Malta) Kirkop
- Dates: 30 May – 3 June

Sport shooting at the 2023 Games of the Small States of Europe was held at the Kirkop Sports Complex in Kirkop from 30 May to 3 June 2023. The top nations qualified for the 2023 European Games in Poland.

== Medal table ==
* Host nation (Malta)

Rank	Nation	Gold	Silver	Bronze	Total
1	Malta*	3	2	0	5
2	San Marino	1	2	0	3
3	Cyprus	1	1	4	6
4	Monaco	1	1	2	4
5	Liechtenstein	1	0	1	2
5	Luxembourg	1	0	1	2
7	Iceland	0	1	0	1
7	Montenegro	0	1	0	1
Totals (8 entries)		8	8	8	24

== Medalists ==
=== Men ===
Event	Gold	Silver	Bronze
10 m air pistol	Boris Jeremenko; Monaco	Ívar Ragnarsson; Iceland	Savvas Evangelou; Cyprus
10 m air rifle	Andreas Charalambous; Cyprus	Miloš Božović; Montenegro	Eric Lanza; Monaco
Trap	Gian Marco Berti; San Marino	Alfio Tomassoni; San Marino	Nihat Akterzi; Cyprus
Double trap	Matthew Grech; Malta	William Chetcuti; Malta	Lyndon Sosa; Luxembourg
Skeet	Clive Farrugia; Malta	Marcello Attard; Malta	Nicolas Vasiliou; Cyprus

=== Women ===
Event	Gold	Silver	Bronze
10 m air pistol	Eleanor Bezzina; Malta	Magali Pierre-Forest; Monaco	Carine Ornella; Monaco
10 m air rifle	Leonie Mautz; Liechtenstein	Marilena Constantinou; Cyprus	Larissa Vanoni; Liechtenstein
Trap	Lena Bidoli; Luxembourg	Alessandra Perilli; San Marino	Madina Kuchkarova; Cyprus
