= Swimming at the 2017 Games of the Small States of Europe =

Swimming at the 2017 Games of the Small States of Europe was held at the Multieventi Swimming Pool, San Marino from 30 May to 2 June 2017.

== Medal table ==
Rank	Nation	Gold	Silver	Bronze	Total
1	Luxembourg	12	11	4	27
2	Iceland	12	4	8	24
3	Liechtenstein	4	3	4	11
4	Cyprus	3	8	6	17
5	Monaco	1	2	1	4
6	Malta	0	2	5	7
7	San Marino*	0	2	3	5
8	Andorra	0	0	1	1
Totals (8 entries)		32	32	32	96

== Medalists ==
=== Men ===
Event	Gold		Silver		Bronze	
50m freestyle	Julien Henx (LUX)	22.81 GR	Andrew Chetcuti (MLT)	23.05	Matthew Zammit (MLT)	23.36
100m freestyle	Julien Henx (LUX)	50.11	Pit Brandenburger (LUX)	50.69	Andrew Chetcuti (MLT)	51.14
200m freestyle	Raphaël Stacchiotti (LUX)	1:51:76	Pit Brandenburger (LUX)	1:52:80	Constantinos Hadjittooulis (CYP)	1:53:19
400m freestyle	Constantinos Hadjittooulis (CYP)	3:59.04	Pit Brandenburger (LUX)	3:59.32	Patrik Oliver Vetsch (LIE)	4:04.34
1500m freestyle	Constantinos Hadjittooulis (CYP)	16:00.98	Christoph Meier (LIE)	16:08.38	Nicolas Ioannides (CYP)	16:12.68
100m backstroke	Raphaël Stacchiotti (LUX)	56.61	Filippos Iakovidis (CYP)	57.37	Davíð Hildiberg Aðalsteinsson (ISL)	57.50
200m backstroke	Sebastian Konnaris (CYP)	2:06.57	Max Mannes (LUX)	2:06.78	Davíð Hildiberg Aðalsteinsson (ISL)	2:09.76
100m breaststroke	Laurent Carnol (LUX)	1:02:43	Viktor Máni Vilbergsson (ISL)	1:03:73	Michael Stafrace (MLT)	1:05:23
200m breaststroke	Laurent Carnol (LUX)	2:15.00	Christoph Meier (LIE)	2:17.20	Viktor Máni Vilbergsson (ISL)	2:17.21
100m butterfly	Julien Henx (LUX)	54.78	Raphaël Stacchiotti (LUX)	55.08	Ágúst Júlíusson (ISL)	55.67
200m butterfly	Raphaël Stacchiotti (LUX)	2:02.60 GR	Mikhail Umnov (MLT)	2:04.73	Þröstur Bjarnason (ISL)	2:12.51
200m individual medley	Raphaël Stacchiotti (LUX)	2:02.25	Thomas Tsiopanis (CYP)	2:07.13	Viktor Máni Vilbergsson (ISL)	2:14.31
400m individual medley	Christoph Meier (LIE)	4:23.36 GR	Raphaël Stacchiotti (LUX)	4:31.38	Thomas Tsiopanis (CYP)	4:33.15
4 × 100m freestyle relay	Luxembourg; Julien Henx (50.77); Max Mannes (51.74); Pit Brandenburger (50.64); Raphaël Stacchiotti (50.63)	3:23.78 GR	Iceland; Aron Örn Stefánsson (52.02); Kristofer Sigurdsson (52.19); Kristinn Þórarinsson (52.00); Davíð Hildiberg Aðalsteinsson (51.18)	3:27.39	Malta; Andrew Chetcuti (51.42); Matthew Galea (52.24); Mikhail Umnov (53.61); Matthew Zammit (51.61)	3:28.88
4 × 200m freestyle relay	Luxembourg; Julien Henx (1:53.33); Pit Brandenburger (1:52.54); Max Mannes (1:56.00); Raphaël Stacchiotti (1:53.10)	7:34.97	Iceland; Kristofer Sigurdsson (1:56.12); Aron Örn Stefánsson (1:56.32); Þröstur Bjarnason (1:57.93); Davíð Hildiberg Aðalsteinsson (1:55.97)	7:46.34	Cyprus; Constantinos Hadjittooulis (1:55.07); Thomas Tsiopanis (1:56.12); Nicolas Ioannides (2:01.04); Sebastian Konnaris (1:55.05)	7:47.28
4 × 100m medley relay	Luxembourg; Raphaël Stacchiotti (56.49); Laurent Carnol (1:02.14); Julien Henx (54.59); Pit Brandenburger (50.81)	3:44.03	Iceland; Davíð Hildiberg Aðalsteinsson (58.11); Viktor Máni Vilbergsson (1:03.14); Ágúst Júlíusson (54.95); Aron Örn Stefánsson (51.47)	3:47.67	Malta; Thomas James Wareing (1:02.11); Michael Stafrace (1:04.31); Mikhail Umnov (55.61); Andrew Chetcuti (50.55)	3:52.58

=== Women ===
Event	Gold		Silver		Bronze	
50m freestyle	Bryndís Rún Hansen (ISL)	26.22	Kalia Antoniou (CYP)	26.34	Pauline Viste (MON)	26.73
100m freestyle	Bryndís Rún Hansen (ISL)	57.11	Julia Hassler (LIE)	57.27	Kalia Antoniou (CYP)	57.83
200m freestyle	Julia Hassler (LIE)	2:01:47 GR	Monique Oliver (LUX)	2:03:59	Eygló Ósk Gústafsdóttir (ISL)	2:04:24
400m freestyle	Julia Hassler (LIE)	4:12.31 GR	Monique Oliver (LUX)	4:18.12	Arianna Valloni (SMR)	4:21.38
800m freestyle	Julia Hassler (LIE)	8:36.14 GR	Monique Oliver (LUX)	8:54.90	Arianna Valloni (SMR)	8:58.91
100m backstroke	Eygló Ósk Gústafsdóttir (ISL)	1:01.67	Sara Rolko (LUX)	1:04.15	Jacqueline Banky (LUX)	1:05.20
200m backstroke	Eygló Ósk Gústafsdóttir (ISL)	2:17.30	Jacqueline Banky (LUX)	2:20.70	Mónica Ramírez (AND)	2:24.81
100m breaststroke	Hrafnhildur Lúthersdóttir (ISL)	1:08:84	Alexandra Schegoleva (CYP)	1:13:62	Theresa Banzer (LIE)	1:13:98
200m breaststroke	Hrafnhildur Lúthersdóttir (ISL)	2:28.89	Alexandra Schegoleva (CYP)	2:34.97	Theresa Banzer (LIE)	2:38.15
100m butterfly	Bryndís Rún Hansen (ISL)	1:01.57	Tiffany Pou (MON)	1:02.39	Sotiria Neofytou (CYP)	1:02.83
200m butterfly	Tiffany Pou (MON)	2:20.93	Beatrice Felici (SMR)	2:21.39	Bryndís Bolladóttir (ISL)	2:23.80
200m individual medley	Hrafnhildur Lúthersdóttir (ISL)	2:17.82	Eleni Stefanidou (CYP)	2:21.35	Monique Olivier (LUX)	2:23.56
400m individual medley	Hrafnhildur Lúthersdóttir (ISL)	4:55.05	Eleni Stefanidou (CYP)	5:00.44	Theresa Regina Hefel (LIE)	5:06.89
4 × 100m freestyle relay	Iceland; Bryndís Rún Hansen (56.70); Eygló Ósk Gústafsdóttir (56.58); Bryndís Bolladóttir (59.09); Hrafnhildur Lúthersdóttir (56.87)	3:49.24	Monaco; Pauline Viste (58.21); Tiffany Pou (57.84); Tifenn Bertaux (58.76); Lauriane Gerbaudo (1:00.34)	3:55.15	San Marino; Sara Lettoli (58.14); Carlotta Bulzoni (59.80); Elisa Bernardi (58.90); Beatrice Felici (58.88)	3:55.72
4 × 200m freestyle relay	Iceland; Bryndís Rún Hansen (2:06.25); Eygló Ósk Gústafsdóttir (2:04.72); Sunneva Dögg Friðriksdóttir (2:05.96); Hrafnhildur Lúthersdóttir (2:04.20)	8:21.13	San Marino; Sara Lettoli (2:06.26); Elena Giovannini (2:06.93); Arianna Valloni (2:07.12); Elisa Bernardi (2:08.09)	8:28.40	Luxembourg; Yaël Hamen Saieg (2:10.18); Maria Perez Garcia (2:12.62); Jacqueline Banky (2:09.86); Monique Olivier (2:03.86)	8:36.52
4 × 100m medley relay	Iceland; Eygló Ósk Gústafsdóttir (1:00.95 GR); Hrafnhildur Lúthersdóttir (1:08.52); Inga Elin Cryer (1:04.22); Bryndís Rún Hansen (56.81)	4:10.50 GR	Cyprus; Sofia Papadopoulou (1:08.84); Alexandra Schegoleva (1:13.67); Sotiria Neofytou (1:03.30); Kalia Antoniou (57.63)	4:23.44	Luxembourg; Sara Rolko (1:05.30); Jacqueline Banky (1:18.36); Monique Olivier (1:03.20); Yaël Hamen Saieg (58.89)	4:25.75
