= Swimming at the 2015 Games of the Small States of Europe =

Swimming at the 2015 Games of the Small States of Europe was held from 2–5 June 2015 at Laugardalslaug Aquatic Center, Reykjavík.

== Medal summary ==
=== Medal table ===
* Host nation (Iceland)

Rank	Nation	Gold	Silver	Bronze	Total
1	Luxembourg	16	8	5	29
2	Iceland*	10	13	11	34
3	Liechtenstein	5	4	5	14
4	Malta	0	2	3	5
5	Cyprus	0	2	1	3
6	Monaco	0	1	4	5
7	San Marino	0	1	1	2
8	Andorra	0	0	1	1
Totals (8 entries)		31	31	31	93

=== Men ===
Event	Gold		Silver		Bronze	
50 m freestyle	Julien Henx (LUX)	23.17	Andrew Chetcuti (MLT)	23.28	Alexander Jóhannesson (ISL)	23.70
100 m freestyle	Julien Henx (LUX)	50.39	Andrew Chetcuti (MLT)	51.69	Jean-François Schneiders (LUX)	51.71
200 m freestyle	Raphaël Stacchiotti (LUX)	1:51.34	Jean-François Schneiders (LUX)	1:52.77	Sebastian Konnaris (CYP)	1:53.42
400 m freestyle	Raphaël Stacchiotti (LUX)	3:57.43	Christoph Meier (LIE)	4:02.05	Antoine Biver (LUX)	4:04.21
1500 m freestyle	Christoph Meier (LIE)	15:55.71	Iacovos Hadjiconstantinou (CYP)	16:14.05	Pol Arias Dourdet (AND)	16:18.50
100 m backstroke	Kolbeinn Hrafnkelsson (ISL)	57.66	Jean-François Schneiders (LUX)	57.67	Kristinn Þórarinsson (ISL)	58.21
200 m backstroke	Jean-François Schneiders (LUX)	2:05.41	Sebastian Konnaris (CYP)	2:05.88	Kristinn Þórarinsson (ISL)	2:08.92
100 m breaststroke	Laurent Carnol (LUX)	1:01.24 GR	Anton Sveinn McKee (ISL)	1:02.81	Andrea Bolognesi (MON)	1:03.53
200 m breaststroke	Laurent Carnol (LUX)	2:11.99 GR	Anton Sveinn McKee (ISL)	2:12.66	Christoph Meier (LIE)	2:17.30
100 m butterfly	Raphaël Stacchiotti (LUX)	54.30	Julien Henx (LUX)	55.12	Andrew Chetcuti (MLT)	55.31
200 m butterfly	Laurent Carnol (LUX)	2:02.93 GR	Christoph Meier (LIE)	2:03.15	Michael Umnov (MLT)	2:05.77
200 m individual medley	Raphaël Stacchiotti (LUX)	2:00.28 GR	Anton Sveinn McKee (ISL)	2:04.53	Christoph Meier (LIE)	2:05.13
400 m individual medley	Raphaël Stacchiotti (LUX)	4:24.02 GR	Christoph Meier (LIE)	4:26.58	Anton Sveinn McKee (ISL)	4:32.99
4×100 m freestyle relay	Luxembourg; Julien Henx; Jean-François Schneiders; Laurent Carnol; Raphaël Stacchiotti	3:24.18 GR	Monaco; Scott Bole; François Xavier Paquot; Andrea Bolognesi; Antonio Sica	3:29.37	Malta; Andrew Chetcuti; Matthew Galea; Michael Umnov; Julian Harding	3:30.57
4×200 m freestyle relay	Luxembourg; Jean-François Schneiders; Julien Henx; Laurent Carnol; Raphaël Stacchiotti	7:35.41 GR	Iceland; Kristofer Sigurdsson; Daniel Hannes Paulson; Kristinn Þórarinsson; Anton Sveinn McKee	7:41.54	Monaco; Filippo Novara; François Xavier Paquot; Scott Bole; Andrea Bolognesi	7:51.22
4×100 m medley relay	Luxembourg; Jean-François Schneiders; Laurent Carnol; Raphaël Stacchiotti; Julien Henx	3:43.75	Iceland; Kolbeinn Hrafnkelsson; Anton Sveinn McKee; Ágúst Júlíusson; Alexander Jóhannesson	3:49.01	Monaco; Andrea Bolognesi; François Xavier Paquot; Filippo Novara; Scott Bole	3:54.00

=== Women ===
Event	Gold		Silver		Bronze	
50 m freestyle	Julie Meynen (LUX)	25.72	Bryndís Rún Hansen (ISL)	25.95	Ingibjörg Kristín Jónsdóttir (ISL)	26.39
100 m freestyle	Julie Meynen (LUX)	55.66 GR	Bryndís Rún Hansen (ISL)	56.12	Ingibjörg Kristín Jónsdóttir (ISL)	58.13
200 m freestyle	Julia Hassler (LIE)	2:02.61	Monique Olivier (LUX)	2:02.75	Inga Elin Cryer (ISL)	2:05.40
400 m freestyle	Julia Hassler (LIE)	4:14.32 GR	Monique Olivier (LUX)	4:16.74	Inga Elin Cryer (ISL)	4:24.07
800 m freestyle	Julia Hassler (LIE)	8:42.06 GR	Monique Olivier (LUX)	8:49.57	Inga Elin Cryer (ISL)	9:03.66
100 m backstroke	Eygló Ósk Gústafsdóttir (ISL)	1:01.20 GR	Ingibjörg Kristín Jónsdóttir (ISL)	1:03.84	Julie Meynen (LUX)	1:05.42
200 m backstroke	Eygló Ósk Gústafsdóttir (ISL)	2:12.52 GR	Jóhanna Gústafsdóttir (ISL)	2:19.11	Eline Van Den Bossche (LUX)	2:23.63
100 m breaststroke	Hrafnhildur Lúthersdóttir (ISL)	1:08.07 GR	Johanna Gerda Gústafsdóttir (ISL)	1:13.19	Theresa Banzer (LIE)	1:13.52
200 m breaststroke	Hrafnhildur Lúthersdóttir (ISL)	2:25.39 GR	Theresa Banzer (LIE)	2:37.87	Karin Arngeirsdóttir (ISL)	2:41.91
100 m butterfly	Johanna Gerda Gústafsdóttir (ISL)	1:00.91 GR	Bryndís Rún Hansen (ISL)	1:01.10	Julia Hassler (LIE)	1:02.93
200 m butterfly	Julia Hassler (LIE)	2:16.38	Monique Olivier (LUX)	2:18.18	Inga Elin Cryer (ISL)	2:19.39
200 m individual medley	Hrafnhildur Lúthersdóttir (ISL)	2:13.83 GR	Johanna Gerda Gústafsdóttir (ISL)	2:18.14	Monique Olivier (LUX)	2:21.70
400 m individual medley	Hrafnhildur Lúthersdóttir (ISL)	4:46.70 GR	Johanna Gerda Gústafsdóttir (ISL)	4:53.55	Julia Hassler (LIE)	5:02.37
4×100 m freestyle relay	Iceland; Bryndís Rún Hansen; Eygló Ósk Gústafsdóttir; Ingibjörg Kristín Jónsdóttir; Johanna Gerda Gústafsdóttir	3:47.27 GR	San Marino; Sara Lettoli; Martina Ceccaroni; Elena Giovannini; Beatrice Felici	3:57.38	Monaco; Tiffany Pou; Marion Natalicchi; Pauline Viste; Runa Shimizu	4:01.95
4×200 m freestyle relay	Iceland; Bryndís Rún Hansen; Inga Elin Cryer; Ingibjörg Kristín Jónsdóttir; Johanna Gerda Gústafsdóttir	8:20.96 GR	Luxembourg; Julie Meynen; Monique Olivier; Christiana Angelidis; Eline van den Bossche	8:29.26	San Marino; Sara Lettoli; Elena Giovannini; Elisa Bernardi; Beatrice Felici	8:39.58

== Men's results ==
=== 100 m freestyle ===
Rank	Heat	Lane	Name	Nationality	Time	Notes
1	2		Andrew Chetcuti	Malta	51,83	A
2	2		Julien Henx	Luxembourg	51,91	A
3	1		Jean-François Schneiders	Luxembourg	52,30	A
4	2		Sebastian Konnaris	Cyprus	52,54	A
5	1		Alexander Jóhannesson	Iceland	52,68	A
6	2		Scott Bole	Monaco	52,78	A
7	2		Iacovos Hadjiconstantinou	Cyprus	53,19	A
8	1		Matthew Galea	Malta	53,27	A
9	2		Birkir Snær Fannarsson	Iceland	53,36	R
10	1		François-Xavier Paquot	Monaco	53,36	R
11	1		Patrick Vetsch	Liechtenstein	54,29	

== Women's results ==
=== 100 m freestyle ===
Rank	Heat	Lane	Name	Nationality	Time	Notes
1	1		Bryndís Rún Hansen	Iceland	57.80	A
2	2		Julie Meynen	Luxembourg	58.18	A
3	1		Ingibjoerg Kristin Jonsdottir	Iceland	58.32	A
4	1		Chrysoula Karamanou	Cyprus	59.11	A
5	2		Tiffany Pou	Monaco	59.21	A
6	2		Julia Hassler	Liechtenstein	59.28	A
7	1		Mónica Ramírez	Andorra	59.79	A
8	2		Cristiana Angelidis	Luxembourg	1:00.30	A
9	1		Beatrice Felici	San Marino	1:00.36	R
10	2		Elena Giovannini	San Marino	1:00.43	R
11	1		Nadia Tudo Cubells	Andorra	1:00.47	
12	2		Ksenija Milutinovic	Montenegro	1:01.14	
13	1		Pauline Viste	Monaco	1:01.17	
14	2		Saskia Senti	Liechtenstein	1:02.62	
