= Sotiria Neofytou =

Cypriot swimmer (born 1998)

Personal information
- Native name: Σωτηρία Νεοφύτου
- Born: 23 April 1998 (age 28)

Sport
- Sport: Swimming
Medal record
Women's swimming
Representing Cyprus
Games of the Small States of Europe
Silver medal – second place	2017 San Marino	4x100 m medley
Silver medal – second place	2013 Luxembourg	4x100 m medley
Bronze medal – third place	2017 San Marino	100 m butterfly

Sotiria Neofytou (Σωτηρία Νεοφύτου, born 23 April 1998) is a Cypriot swimmer. She competed in the women's 100 metre butterfly event at the 2016 Summer Olympics.
