= Omiros Zagkas =

Cypriot swimmer (born 1993)

Personal information
- Native name: Όμηρος Ζάγκας
- Born: 18 January 1993 (age 33)

Sport
- Sport: Swimming
Medal record
Men's swimming
Representing Cyprus
Games of the Small States of Europe
Gold medal – first place	2019 Montenegro	50 m freestyle
Silver medal – second place	2013 Luxembourg	100 m freestyle
Silver medal – second place	2013 Luxembourg	4×100 m freestyle
Silver medal – second place	2019 Montenegro	50 m breaststroke
Bronze medal – third place	2013 Luxembourg	50 m freestyle
Bronze medal – third place	2013 Luxembourg	4×200 m freestyle
Bronze medal – third place	2013 Luxembourg	4×100 m medley
Bronze medal – third place	2019 Montenegro	4×100 m medley

Omiros Zagkas (Greek: Όμηρος Ζάγκας; born 18 January 1993) is a Cypriot swimmer. In 2010, he competed at the 2010 Summer Youth Olympics in the boys' 50 metre freestyle. In 2019, he represented Cyprus at the 2019 World Aquatics Championships held in Gwangju, South Korea and he finished in 60th place in the heats in the men's 50 metre freestyle event. In the men's 100 metre freestyle he finished in 79th place in the heats. In the same year, he competed at the 2019 Games of the Small States of Europe held in Budva, Montenegro.
