= Mònica Ramírez =

Andorran swimmer (born 1993)

Personal information
- Full name: Mònica Ramírez Abella
- Born: 27 December 1993 (age 32) Escaldes-Engordany, Andorra
- Height: 170 cm (5 ft 7 in)
- Weight: 55 kg (121 lb)

Sport
- Country: Andorra
- Sport: Swimming
Medal record
Women's swimming
Representing Andorra
Games of the Small States of Europe
Silver medal – second place	2011 Liechtenstein	100 m backstroke
Silver medal – second place	2011 Liechtenstein	200 m backstroke
Bronze medal – third place	2017 San Marino	200 m backstroke
Bronze medal – third place	2019 Budva	50 m backstroke
Bronze medal – third place	2019 Budva	100 m backstroke

Mònica Ramírez Abella (Note: In this Catalan name, the first or paternal surname is Ramírez and the second or maternal family name is Abella; both are generally joined by the conjunction "i".) (born 27 December 1993 in Escaldes-Engordany) is an Andorran swimmer. She competed at the 2012 Summer Olympics in the Women's 100 metre backstroke, finishing in 42nd place in the heats, failing to qualify for the semifinals. She also competed in the 50 m freestyle event at the 2013 World Aquatics Championships.

In 2019, she won two bronze medals at the 2019 Games of the Small States of Europe held in Budva, Montenegro.
