= Julia Hassler =

Liechtenstein swimmer (born 1993)

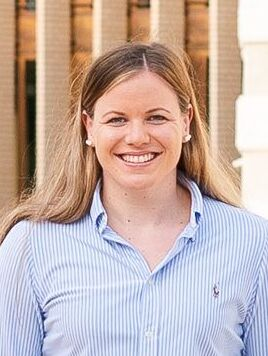
- Hassler in 2021

Personal information
- Born: 27 February 1993 (age 33) Schellenberg, Liechtenstein
- Height: 1.77 m (5 ft 10 in)
- Weight: 73 kg (161 lb)

Sport
- Country: Liechtenstein
- Sport: Swimming
- Event: Freestyle
- Club: SC Unterland, Eschen
Medal record
European Championships (SC)
Bronze medal – third place	2017 Copenhagen	400 m freestyle
Games of the Small States of Europe
Gold medal – first place	2011 Liechtenstein	800 m freestyle
Gold medal – first place	2011 Liechtenstein	200 m butterfly
Gold medal – first place	2013 Luxembourg	400 m freestyle
Gold medal – first place	2013 Luxembourg	800 m freestyle
Gold medal – first place	2013 Luxembourg	100 m butterfly
Gold medal – first place	2013 Luxembourg	200 m butterfly
Gold medal – first place	2015 Iceland	200 m freestyle
Gold medal – first place	2015 Iceland	400 m freestyle
Gold medal – first place	2015 Iceland	800 m freestyle
Gold medal – first place	2017 San Marino	200 m freestyle
Gold medal – first place	2017 San Marino	400 m freestyle
Gold medal – first place	2017 San Marino	800 m freestyle
Gold medal – first place	2019 Montenegro	200 m freestyle
Gold medal – first place	2019 Montenegro	400 m freestyle
Gold medal – first place	2019 Montenegro	800 m freestyle
Gold medal – first place	2019 Montenegro	100 m butterfly
Gold medal – first place	2019 Montenegro	200 m butterfly
Gold medal – first place	2019 Montenegro	400 m medley
Silver medal – second place	2011 Liechtenstein	200 m freestyle
Silver medal – second place	2011 Liechtenstein	400m freestyle
Silver medal – second place	2011 Liechtenstein	400 m medley
Silver medal – second place	2013 Luxembourg	200 m freestyle
Silver medal – second place	2017 San Marino	100 m freestyle
Bronze medal – third place	2013 Luxembourg	100 m freestyle
Bronze medal – third place	2013 Luxembourg	400 m medley
Bronze medal – third place	2013 Luxembourg	4x100 m freestyle
Bronze medal – third place	2013 Luxembourg	4x200 m freestyle
Bronze medal – third place	2015 Iceland	100 m butterfly
Bronze medal – third place	2015 Iceland	400 m medley

Julia Hassler (born 27 February 1993) is a national-record holding swimmer from Liechtenstein and three-time Olympian. She was the Liechtenstein flag-bearer in the closing-ceremony of the 2012 Olympics, as well as the opening ceremonies in 2016 and 2021. She won the bronze medal at the 2017 European Short Course Swimming Championships.

== Career ==
Hassler swam for Liechtenstein at numerous international competitions. From 2011 she won 18 gold medals over five editions of the Games of the Small States of Europe, and 29 medals overall.

At the 2012 Olympics, she was one of three athletes to compete for Liechtenstein. She swam the 400 and 800 freestyles, setting national records in both (4:12.99 and 8:35.18), finishing 27th in the 400 and 17th in the 800. She carried Liechtenstein's flag at the Closing Ceremony of the Games.

At the 2016 Summer Olympics, Hassler competed in the 800 m freestyle event. She placed 21st in the heats with a time of 8:38.19 and did not qualify for the final. She was the flagbearer for Liechtenstein during the Parade of Nations at the start of the event.

In 2017, Hassler won the 400 metres freestyle bronze medal at the European Short Course Swimming Championships. She competed in her third Olympics at the 2020 Summer Olympics, held in 2021, carrying her national flag in the opening ceremony and taking part in the 400 metres, 800 metres and 1500 metres events.

In November 2021, Hassler announced her retirement from competitive swimming. At that time she held Liechtenstein Records, both long course (50m) and short course (25m), in the: 100, 200, 400, 800 and 1500 freestyle; 100 and 200 butterfly; and 400 metres individual medley, as well as the short course 50m freestyle.

Olympic Games
Preceded by Stephanie Vogt	Flagbearer for Liechtenstein; Rio de Janeiro 2016	Succeeded by Incumbent
