= Monique Olivier =

Luxembourgish swimmer

Personal information
- Born: 13 May 1998 (age 28) Alberton, South Africa

Sport
- Country: Luxembourg
- Sport: Swimming
- Team: University of Edinburgh/ Swimming Luxembourg
Medal record
Games of the Small States of Europe
Silver medal – second place	2013 Luxembourg	400 m Freestyle
Silver medal – second place	2013 Luxembourg	800 m freestyle
Silver medal – second place	2013 Luxembourg	4x100 m freestyle
Silver medal – second place	2013 Luxembourg	4x200 m freestyle
Silver medal – second place	2015 Iceland	200 m butterfly
Silver medal – second place	2017 San Marino	200 m freestyle
Silver medal – second place	2017 San Marino	400 m freestyle
Silver medal – second place	2017 San Marino	800 m freestyle
Bronze medal – third place	2013 Luxembourg	200 m medley
Bronze medal – third place	2015 Iceland	200 m medley
Bronze medal – third place	2017 San Marino	200 m medley
Bronze medal – third place	2017 San Marino	4x200 m freestyle
Bronze medal – third place	2017 San Marino	4x100 m medley

Monique Olivier (born 13 May 1998) is a Luxembourgish swimmer. She attended the International School of Luxembourg in Luxembourg City and has swum for Luxembourg at several international competitions, including the 2013 Games of the Small States of Europe, 2014 FINA World Swimming Championships (25 m), and 2014 Summer Youth Olympics.

As of March 2019, she holds Luxembourg records in long course (50m) 200m,400m 800m and 1500 freestyle, 200m and 400 m individual medley and 200 butterfly, 4x100 and 4x200 freestyle relay, as well as short course (25m)200m,400m,800m and 1500 freestyle, 200m and 400m individual medley and 200m butterfly
