= Filippos Iakovidis =

Cypriot swimmer (born 1998)

Personal information
- Born: 14 April 1998 (age 28)

Sport
- Sport: Swimming
Medal record
Men's swimming
Representing Cyprus
Games of the Small States of Europe
Silver medal – second place	2017 San Marino	100 m backstroke
Silver medal – second place	2019 Budva	100 m backstroke
Bronze medal – third place	2019 Budva	4 × 100m medley relay

Filippos Iakovidis (born 14 April 1998) is a Cypriot swimmer. He represented Cyprus at the 2019 World Aquatics Championships in Gwangju, South Korea. He competed in the men's 50 metre backstroke and men's 100 metre backstroke events and in both events he did not advance to compete in the semi-finals.

In the same year, he won the silver medal in the men's 100 metre backstroke event at the 2019 Games of the Small States of Europe held in Budva, Montenegro.
