= Arianna Valloni =

Sammarinese swimmer (born 2001)

Personal information
- Born: 10 April 2001 (age 25)

Sport
- Sport: Swimming
Medal record
Women's swimming
Representing San Marino
Games of the Small States of Europe
Silver medal – second place	2017 San Marino	4 × 200 m freestyle
Silver medal – second place	2019 Budva	800 m freestyle
Bronze medal – third place	2017 San Marino	400 m freestyle
Bronze medal – third place	2017 San Marino	800 m freestyle

Arianna Valloni (born 10 April 2001) is a Sammarinese swimmer.

== Career ==
In 2018, she finished in 22nd place in the heats in the girls' 400 metre freestyle at the 2018 Summer Youth Olympics held in Buenos Aires, Argentina. She also competed in the girls' 800 metre freestyle where she finished in 15th place.

In 2019, she won the silver medal in the women's 800 metre freestyle at the 2019 Games of the Small States of Europe held in Budva, Montenegro. In 2019, she represented San Marino at the 2019 World Aquatics Championships held in Gwangju, South Korea. She competed in the women's 800 metre freestyle and women's 1500 metre freestyle events. In both events she did not advance to compete in the final.

At the 2020 European Aquatics Championships held in Budapest, Hungary, she competed in the women's 800 metre freestyle and women's 1500 metre freestyle events.

In 2021, she represented San Marino at the 2020 Summer Olympics held in Tokyo, Japan. She competed in the women's 800 metre freestyle and women's 1500 metre freestyle events. She was also one of the flagbearers for San Marino during the 2020 Summer Olympics Parade of Nations as part of the opening ceremony on 23 July 2021, along with wrestler Myles Amine.

Olympic Games
Preceded by Arianna Perilli	Flagbearer for San Marino (with Myles Amine); Tokyo 2020	Succeeded by Incumbent
