= Laurent Carnol =

Luxembourgish swimmer

Personal information
- Full name: Laurent Carnol
- National team: Luxembourg
- Born: 17 October 1989 (age 36) Ettelbruck, Luxembourg
- Height: 1.86 m (6 ft 1 in)
- Weight: 80 kg (176 lb)

Sport
- Sport: Swimming
- Strokes: Breaststroke
- Club: SC Le Dauphin Ettelbruck (LUX)
- College team: Loughborough University (GBR)
- Coach: Ian Armiger
Medal record
Men's swimming
Representing Luxembourg
Games of the Small States of Europe
Gold medal – first place	2011 Liechstenstein	200 m breaststroke
Gold medal – first place	2015 Iceland	100 m breaststroke
Gold medal – first place	2015 Iceland	200 m breaststroke
Gold medal – first place	2015 Iceland	200 m butterfly
Gold medal – first place	2015 Iceland	4x100 m freestyle
Gold medal – first place	2015 Iceland	4x100 m medley
Gold medal – first place	2015 Iceland	4x200 m freestyle
Gold medal – first place	2017 San Marino	100 m breaststroke
Gold medal – first place	2017 San Marino	200 m breaststroke
Gold medal – first place	2017 San Marino	4x100 m medley
Silver medal – second place	2011 Liechstenstein	100 m breaststroke
Silver medal – second place	2011 Liechstenstein	4x100 m medley
Bronze medal – third place	2007 Monaco	200 m breaststroke
Bronze medal – third place	2013 Luxembourg	400 m medley

Laurent Carnol (born 17 October 1989) is a Luxembourgish swimmer, who specialized in breaststroke events. Carnol set national records of 1:01.39 (100 m) and 2:09.78 (200 m) in the men's breaststroke at the 2010 European Aquatics Championships in Budapest, Hungary, and at the 2012 European Long Course Meet in Luxembourg City, respectively. Carnol is also a member of SC Le Dauphin Ettelbruck under his personal coach Ian Armiger, and currently, a chemistry student at Loughborough University in Leicestershire, England.

Carnol made his first Luxembourgish team, as a 19-year-old, at the 2008 Summer Olympics in Beijing. He qualified for the men's 200 m breaststroke by eclipsing a FINA B-cut of 2:17.29 from the European Championships in Eindhoven, Netherlands. Carnol challenged seven other swimmers on the second heat including three-time Olympian Jakob Jóhann Sveinsson of Iceland. He raced to third place by 0.29 of a second behind Sveinsson in his lifetime best of 2:15.87. Carnol failed to qualify for the semifinals, as he placed fortieth overall in the evening preliminaries.

Four years after competing in his last Olympics, Carnol qualified for his second Luxembourgish team, as a 23-year-old, at the 2012 Summer Olympics in London, by attaining an A-standard entry time of 2:09.78 (200 m breaststroke) from the European Long Course Meet in Luxembourg City. On the first day of the morning preliminaries, Carnol won the second heat of the men's 100 m breaststroke by nearly half a second (0.50) ahead of Serbia's Čaba Silađi, with a time of 1:01.46. His storming victory was not sufficiently enough to put him through the next round, as Carnol placed twenty-sixth out of 44 swimmers in the preliminary heats. In the 200 m breaststroke, Carnol recorded the twelfth fastest qualifying time of 2:10.83 to secure his place for the semifinals. Carnol fell short in his bid for the final, as he finished the semifinal run by 0.03 of a second behind New Zealand's Glenn Snyders in a second slowest time of 2:11.17. Achieving his best finish, Carnol became the first ever Luxembourgish swimmer to reach the semifinals at the Olympics.

He again competed for Luxembourg in both events at the 2016 Olympics.
