= Christoph Meier =

Liechtenstein swimmer (born 1993)

Personal information
- Nationality: Liechtenstein
- Born: 3 January 1993 (age 33) Vaduz, Liechtenstein
- Height: 197 cm (6 ft 6 in)
- Weight: 95 kg (209 lb)

Sport
- Sport: Swimming
Medal record
Men's swimming
Representing Liechtenstein
Games of the Small States of Europe
| Gold medal – first place | 2013 Luxembourg | 200 m butterfly |
| Gold medal – first place | 2015 Iceland | 1500 m freestyle |
| Gold medal – first place | 2017 San Marino | 400 m medley |
| Gold medal – first place | 2019 Podgorica | 200 m butterfly |
| Silver medal – second place | 2011 Liechtenstein | 200 m butterfly |
| Silver medal – second place | 2013 Luxembourg | 1500 m freestyle |
| Silver medal – second place | 2013 Luxembourg | 200 m medley |
| Silver medal – second place | 2013 Luxembourg | 400 m medley |
| Silver medal – second place | 2015 Iceland | 400 m freestyle |
| Silver medal – second place | 2015 Iceland | 200 m butterfly |
| Silver medal – second place | 2015 Iceland | 400 m medley |
| Silver medal – second place | 2017 San Marino | 200 m breaststroke |
| Silver medal – second place | 2017 San Marino | 1500 m freestyle |
| Silver medal – second place | 2019 Podgorica | 100 m breaststroke |
| Silver medal – second place | 2019 Podgorica | 200 m breaststroke |
| Silver medal – second place | 2019 Podgorica | 200 m medley |
| Silver medal – second place | 2019 Podgorica | 400 m medley |
| Bronze medal – third place | 2013 Luxembourg | 200 m breaststroke |
| Bronze medal – third place | 2015 Iceland | 200 m breaststroke |
| Bronze medal – third place | 2015 Iceland | 200 m medley |
| Bronze medal – third place | 2019 Podgorica | 50 m breaststroke |

Christoph Meier (born 3 January 1993) is a Liechtensteiner swimmer. He competed at the 2016 and 2020 Summer Olympics and is a four-time Games of the Small States of Europe champion.

== Career ==
Meier competed at the 2011 Games of the Small States of Europe and won a silver medal in the 200 metre butterfly behind Andorra's Hocine Haciane. At the 2012 World Short-Course Championships, he finished 47th in the 200 metre freestyle and 26th in the 400 metre individual medley. He finished 36th in the 1500 metres freestyle and set a national record time of 15:39.38. He also set a national record in the 200 metre individual medley with a time of 2:01.25.

Meier won the gold medal in the 200 metre butterfly at the 2013 Games of the Small States of Europe. Additionally, he won silver medals in the 200 and 400 medley and 1500 metre freestyle events. He then represented Liechtenstein at the 2013 World Aquatics Championships in the 200 and 400 metre individual medley events, finishing 43rd and 25th, respectively. He set new national records in both events.

Meier competed at the 2014 European Championships and finished 48th in the 100 metre breaststroke, 23rd in the 200 metre breaststroke, 27th in the 200 metre individual medley, and 14th in the 400 metre individual medley. He then competed at the 2014 World Short-Course Championships and finished 60th in the 50 metre breaststroke, 51st in the 100 metre breaststroke, 29th in the 200 metre breaststroke, 54th in the 100 metre individual medley, 27th in the 400 metre individual medley, and 31st in the 1500 metre freestyle.

Meier won a gold medal in the 1500 metre freestyle at the 2015 Games of the Small States of Europe and broke his own national record with a time of 15:55.71. Additionally, he won silver medals in the 400 metre freestyle, 200 metre butterfly, and 400 metre individual medley. He then represented Liechtenstein at the 2015 World Aquatics Championships and finished 41st in the 200 metre breaststroke and 30th in both the 200 and 400 metre individual medley events.

Meier qualified to represent Liechtenstein at the 2016 Summer Olympics by meeting the Olympic Selection Time in the 400 metre individual medley. At the Olympics, he placed 22nd in the heats and did not qualify for the semifinals. He was the flag bearer for Liechtenstein during the closing ceremony.

Meier won the gold medal in the 400 metre individual medley at the 2017 Games of the Small States of Europe, where he also won silver medals in the 1500 metre freestyle and 200 metre breaststroke events. He then represented Liechtenstein at the 2017 World Aquatics Championships and finished 27th and 26th in the 200 and 400 metre individual medley events, respectively.

Meier competed at the 2019 Games of the Small States of Europe held in Podgorica, Montenegro, and won a gold medal in the 200 metre butterfly. He also won silver medals in the 100 and 200 metre breaststroke events and in the 200 and 400 metre individual medley. Additionally, he won a bronze medal in the 50 metre breaststroke.

Meier qualified to represent Liechtenstein at the 2020 Summer Olympics by meeting the Olympic Selection Time in the 200 metre individual medley and also received a Universality Place for the 400 metre individual medley. He finished 28th out of the 29 competitors in the 400 metre individual medley heats with a time of 4:25.17. Then in the 200 metre individual medley, he finished 44th out of the 45 swimmers in the heats.
