= Andrew Chetcuti =

Maltese swimmer (born 1992)

Personal information
- Full name: Andrew Chetcuti
- Nationality: Maltese
- Born: 19 November 1992 (age 33) Pietà, Malta
- Height: 1.778 m (5 ft 10 in)
- Weight: 165 lb (75 kg)

Sport
- Sport: Swimming
- Strokes: Freestyle, butterfly
Medal record
Games of the Small States of Europe
| Silver medal – second place | 2011 Liechtenstein | 100 m freestyle |
| Silver medal – second place | 2013 Luxembourg | 50 m freestyle |
| Silver medal – second place | 2013 Luxembourg | 100 m butterfly |
| Silver medal – second place | 2015 Iceland | 50 m freestyle |
| Silver medal – second place | 2015 Iceland | 100 m freestyle |
| Silver medal – second place | 2017 San Marino | 50 m freestyle |
| Bronze medal – third place | 2011 Liechtenstein | 50 m freestyle |
| Bronze medal – third place | 2013 Luxembourg | 100 m freestyle |
| Bronze medal – third place | 2015 Iceland | 100 m butterfly |
| Bronze medal – third place | 2015 Iceland | 4x100 m medley |
| Bronze medal – third place | 2017 San Marino | 100 m freestyle |
| Bronze medal – third place | 2017 San Marino | 4x100 m freestyle |
| Bronze medal – third place | 2017 San Marino | 4x100 m medley |

Andrew Chetcuti (born 19 November 1992 in Pietà) is a Maltese freestyle and butterfly swimmer specialising in short course events. He holds 5 individual national records, and 2 in relays.

Chetcuti was one of five athletes to represent Team Malta in the 2012 Summer Olympics. Chetcuti placed third in his heat of the 100 m freestyle, but did not qualify for the semi-finals.

== Personal life ==
Chetcuti is married and joined Bain & Company after earning his Master of Business Administration from the Scheller College of Business. He currently lives in Atlanta, Georgia in the United States after residing in the United Arab Emirates, his place of residence since 1995. Chetcuti holds a Doctorate in Physical Therapy from Massachusetts College of Pharmacy and Health Sciences and a Bachelors of Science in Biology from Georgia Institute of Technology. Chetcuti attended high school at Dubai College where he was Head Boy.

== Personal bests and records held ==
Long course (50 m)

| Event | Time | | Date | Meet | Location | Ref |
|---|---|---|---|---|---|---|
| 50 m freestyle | 29.14 | NR | 29 July 2011 | XIV FINA World Championships | Shanghai, China | |
| 100 m freestyle | 51.98 | NR | 31 May 2011 | Games of the Small States of Europe | Vaduz, Liechtenstein | |
| 200 m freestyle | 1:57.41 | NR | 29 Feb 2012 | Irish Olympic Trials | Dublin, Ireland | |
| 100 m freestyle | 51.67 | (h)NR | 31 July 2012 | London Olympics (Team Malta) | London, United Kingdom | |

Short course (25 m)

| Event | Time | | Date | Meet | Location | Ref |
|---|---|---|---|---|---|---|
| 50 m freestyle | 29.14 | (h)NR | 16 Dec 2010 | 2010 FINA World Swimming Championships | Dubai, United Arab Emirates | |
| 100 m freestyle | 50.86 | (h)NR | 18 Dec 2010 | 2010 FINA World Swimming Championships | Dubai, United Arab Emirates | |
| 50 m butterfly | 24.99 | (h)NR | 17 Dec 2010 | 2010 FINA World Swimming Championships | Dubai, United Arab Emirates | |
| 100 m butterfly | 56.98 | (h)NR | 15 Dec 2010 | 2010 FINA World Swimming Championships | Dubai, United Arab Emirates | |

Legend: WR – World record; ER – European record; NR – Maltese record;
Records not set in finals: h – heat; sf – semifinal; r – relay 1st leg; rh – relay heat 1st leg; b – B final; † – en route to final mark; so – swim-off; tt – time trial

Olympic Games
| Preceded by William Chetcuti | Flagbearer for Malta; Rio de Janeiro 2016 | Succeeded by Incumbent |
