= Raphaël Stacchiotti =

Luxembourgish swimmer

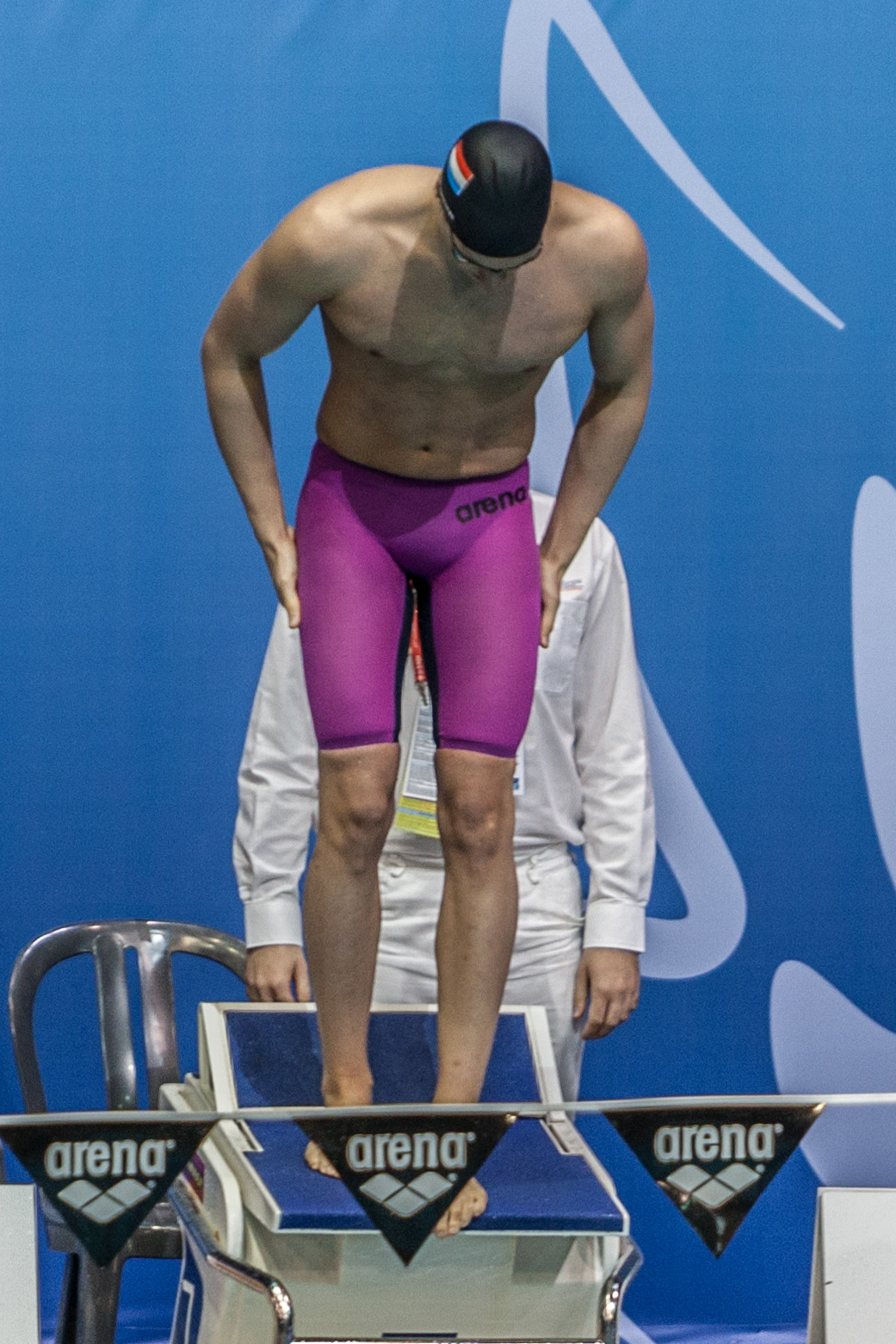
- Netanya 2015

Personal information
- National team: Luxembourg
- Born: 9 March 1992 (age 34) Luxembourg City, Luxembourg
- Height: 1.83 m (6 ft 0 in)
- Weight: 78 kg (172 lb)

Sport
- Sport: Swimming
- Strokes: Freestyle, medley
- Club: SC Le Dauphin Ettelbruck (LUX)
Medal record
Men's swimming
Representing Luxembourg
European Junior Championships
Gold medal – first place	2009 Prague	200 m medley
Gold medal – first place	2010 Helsinki	200 m medley
Silver medal – second place	2010 Helsinki	400 m medley
Games of the Small States of Europe
Gold medal – first place	2007 Monaco	100 m backstroke
Gold medal – first place	2009 Cyprus	100 m freestyle
Gold medal – first place	2009 Cyprus	200 m freestyle
Gold medal – first place	2009 Cyprus	400 m freestyle
Gold medal – first place	2009 Cyprus	100 m backstroke
Gold medal – first place	2009 Cyprus	200 m backstroke
Gold medal – first place	2009 Cyprus	200 m medley
Gold medal – first place	2009 Cyprus	400 m medley
Gold medal – first place	2011 Liechtenstein	200 m freestyle
Gold medal – first place	2011 Liechtenstein	400 m freestyle
Gold medal – first place	2011 Liechtenstein	200 m backstroke
Gold medal – first place	2011 Liechtenstein	200 m medley
Gold medal – first place	2011 Liechtenstein	400 m medley
Gold medal – first place	2011 Liechtenstein	4×200 m freestyle
Gold medal – first place	2013 Luxembourg	4×100 m freestyle
Gold medal – first place	2013 Luxembourg	4×200 m freestyle
Gold medal – first place	2013 Luxembourg	4×100 m medley
Gold medal – first place	2015 Iceland	200 m freestyle
Gold medal – first place	2015 Iceland	400 m freestyle
Gold medal – first place	2015 Iceland	100 m butterfly
Gold medal – first place	2015 Iceland	200 m medley
Gold medal – first place	2015 Iceland	400 m medley
Gold medal – first place	2015 Iceland	4x100 m freestyle
Gold medal – first place	2015 Iceland	4x100 m medley
Gold medal – first place	2015 Iceland	4x200 m freestyle
Gold medal – first place	2017 San Marino	200 m freestyle
Gold medal – first place	2017 San Marino	100 m backstroke
Gold medal – first place	2017 San Marino	200 m butterfly
Gold medal – first place	2017 San Marino	200 m medley
Gold medal – first place	2017 San Marino	4x100 m freestyle
Gold medal – first place	2017 San Marino	4x100 m medley
Gold medal – first place	2017 San Marino	4x200 m freestyle
Gold medal – first place	2019 Montenegro	50 m backstroke
Gold medal – first place	2019 Montenegro	100 m backstroke
Gold medal – first place	2019 Montenegro	200 m backstroke
Gold medal – first place	2019 Montenegro	100 m butterfly
Gold medal – first place	2019 Montenegro	200 m medley
Gold medal – first place	2019 Montenegro	400 m medley
Gold medal – first place	2019 Montenegro	4x100 m freestyle
Gold medal – first place	2019 Montenegro	4x200 m freestyle
Silver medal – second place	2007 Monaco	200 m backstroke
Silver medal – second place	2007 Monaco	4x100 m medley
Silver medal – second place	2009 Cyprus	50 m freestyle
Silver medal – second place	2011 Liechtenstein	4×100 m medley
Silver medal – second place	2017 San Marino	100 m butterfly
Silver medal – second place	2017 San Marino	400 m medley
Silver medal – second place	2019 Montenegro	4x100 m medley
Bronze medal – third place	2007 Monaco	400 m medley
Bronze medal – third place	2011 Liechtenstein	4×100 m freestyle

Raphaël Stacchiotti (born 9 March 1992) is a Luxembourgish swimmer, who specialized in the freestyle and individual medley events. He is a four-time Olympian (2008, 2012, 2016 and 2020), a multiple-time Luxembourgish record holder in all freestyle and medley events, and a double European junior champion. Stacchiotti also holds numerous meet records and collects a total of 49 medals (40 golds, seven silvers, and two bronzes) from the Games of the Small States of Europe (2007, 2009, 2011, 2013, 2015, 2017 and 2019). At the 2008 Summer Olympics, Stacchiotti became the youngest athlete (aged 16) to be chosen by the Luxembourg squad, and was given the honor of carrying the nation's flag in the opening ceremony.

== Career ==
=== International career ===
He won his first international medal at the 2007 Games of the Small States of Europe in the 100 m backstroke.

Stacchiotti made his official debut, as Luxembourg's youngest athlete in history (aged 16) at the 2008 Summer Olympics in Beijing, where he was given the honour of carrying the nation's flag in the opening ceremony. He qualified for the men's 200 m freestyle by eclipsing a FINA B-cut of 1:50.30 from the FINA World Junior Championships in Monterrey, Mexico. Stacchiotti challenged seven other swimmers in heat four, including India's 16-year-old Virdhawal Khade and Czech Republic's three-time Olympian Květoslav Svoboda. He rounded out the field to last place by 0.15 of a second behind Khade in 1:52.01. Stacchiotti failed to advance into the semifinals, as he placed forty-ninth overall out of 58 swimmers in the prelims.

In 2009, Stacchiotti earned his first ever career gold medal in the 200 m individual medley (2:02.56) at the European Junior Championships in Prague, Czech Republic. Two weeks later, at the FINA World Championships in Rome, Italy, Stacchiotti placed forty-seventh in the 200 m individual medley (2:05.51), thirty-fifth in the 400 m individual medley (4:26.63), and forty-fifth in the 200 m freestyle (1:49.61, a Luxembourgish record).

At the 2010 European Junior Swimming Championships in Helsinki, Finland, Stacchiotti stormed home on the final lap to defend his 200 m individual medley title in 2:02.52, holding off Great Britain's Ieuan Lloyd by two-tenths of a second (0.20). He also collected a silver medal in the 400 m individual medley at 4:21.28.

At the 2011 FINA World Championships in Shanghai, Stacchiotti failed to reach the semifinals in any of his individual events, finishing twentieth each in the 200 m individual medley (2:00.87) and 400 m individual medley (4:20.64), both with a personal textile best and a new Luxembourgish record.

=== 2012 Summer Olympics ===
Stacchiotti competed in an individual medley double, as a 20-year-old, at the 2012 Summer Olympics in London. He achieved Olympic invitation times (formerly a FINA B-standard) of 2:00.22 (200 m individual medley) and 4:18.98 (400 m individual medley) from the European Long Course Meet in Luxembourg City.

On the first day of the Games, Stacchiotti placed eighteenth in the 400 m individual medley. Swimming in heat two, he blasted a new Luxembourgish record of 4:17.20, but came up short in second place by nearly half a second (0.50) behind Belgium's Ward Bauwens. Four days later, in the 200 m individual medley, Stacchiotti registered a time of 2:00.38, just a small fraction outside his own record, but missed the semifinals by a tenth of a second (0.10) behind Canada's Andrew Ford. Ending up with frustration and disbelief, Stacchiotti failed in what was to be his most surprising moment of all time: "It's my fault. I completely lost my rhythm during the breaststroke”.

He also competed at the 2016 and 2020 Olympics before retiring after the 2020 Olympics.

== Personal bests ==
As of 25 October 2025.

Long course
Event	Time	Meet
200 m freestyle	1:49.61	2009 World Championships
200 m butterfly	2:02.60	17th Games of the Small States of Europe 2017
200 m individual medley	1:59.62	2019 World Championships
400 m individual medley	4:17.20	2012 Summer Olympics

Short course
Event	Time	Meet
200 m freestyle	1:45.47	French National Championships (25 m)
400 m freestyle	3:46.42	Luxembourg National Championships (25 m)
50 m backstroke	24.65	Luxembourg National Championships (25 m)
100 m backstroke	53.34	2019 European Championships
200 m backstroke	1:56.80	Luxembourg National Championships (25 m)
100 m breaststroke	59.48	French National Championships (25 m)
100 m butterfly	52.64	31e Challenge International de la Ville d'Ettelbruck
200 m butterfly	1:57.20	French National Championships (25 m)
100 m individual medley	53.44	2015 European Championships
200 m individual medley	1:55.53	2015 European Championships
400 m individual medley	4:06.48	2015 European Championships

Olympic Games
Preceded by Gilles Müller	Flagbearer for Luxembourg (with Christine Majerus); Tokyo 2020	Succeeded by Incumbent
