= Eygló Ósk Gústafsdóttir =

Icelandic swimmer (born 1995)

Eygló Ósk
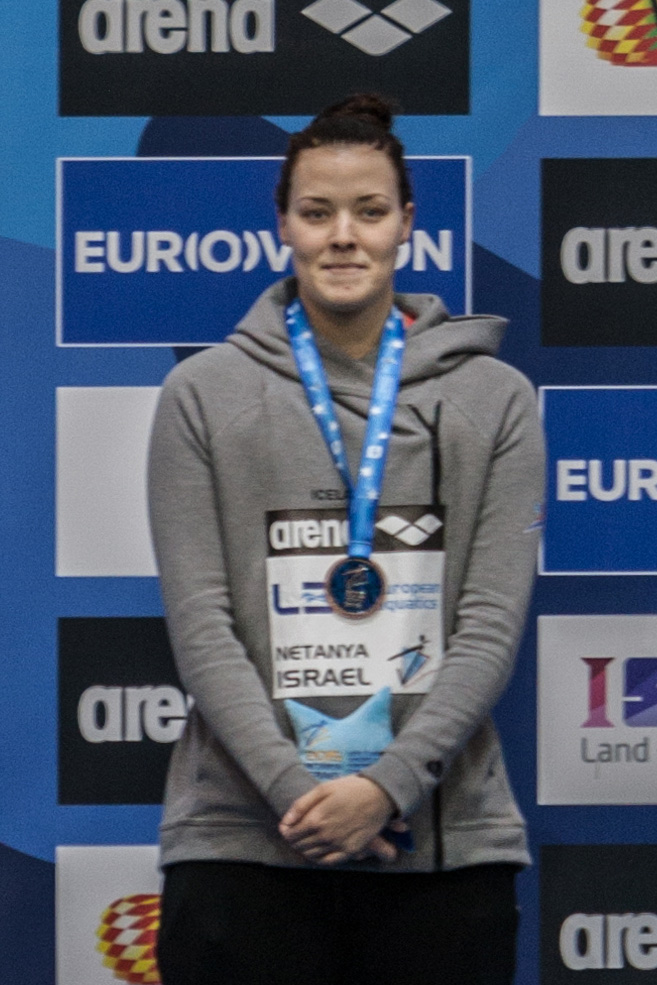
- Netanya 2015

Personal information
- Full name: Eygló Ósk Gústafsdóttir
- Nationality: Iceland
- Born: 1 February 1995 (age 31) Reykjavík, Iceland

Sport
- Sport: Swimming
- Strokes: Backstroke
- Club: Ægir Swim Club
- Coach: Jacky Pellerin
Medal record
Women's swimming
Representing Iceland
European Championships (SC)
Bronze medal – third place	2015 Netanya	100 m backstroke
Bronze medal – third place	2015 Netanya	200 m backstroke
Games of the Small States of Europe
Gold medal – first place	2013 Luxembourg	200 m freestyle
Gold medal – first place	2013 Luxembourg	100 m backstroke
Gold medal – first place	2013 Luxembourg	200 m backstroke
Gold medal – first place	2013 Luxembourg	4×100 m freestyle
Gold medal – first place	2013 Luxembourg	4×200 m freestyle
Gold medal – first place	2013 Luxembourg	4×100 m medley
Gold medal – first place	2015 Iceland	100 m backstroke
Gold medal – first place	2015 Iceland	200 m backstroke
Gold medal – first place	2015 Iceland	4x100 m freestyle
Gold medal – first place	2017 San Marino	100 m backstroke
Gold medal – first place	2017 San Marino	200 m backstroke
Gold medal – first place	2017 San Marino	4x100 m freestyle
Gold medal – first place	2017 San Marino	4x200 m freestyle
Gold medal – first place	2017 San Marino	4x100 m medley
Silver medal – second place	2013 Luxembourg	200 m medley
Silver medal – second place	2013 Luxembourg	400 m medley
Bronze medal – third place	2017 San Marino	200 m freestyle
- Updated on 31 May 2013

Eygló Ósk Gústafsdóttir (born 1 February 1995) is an Icelandic swimmer. She competed at the 2012 Summer Olympics in the women's 100 metre backstroke, finishing 2nd in her heat but in 32nd place overall in the heats, failing to qualify for the semifinals.

On 30 March 2015 Eygló Ósk swam the 200 m backstroke in 2:09.86 minutes, setting new Icelandic and Nordic records; the previous Icelandic record was 2:10.34, set by her herself, while the old Nordic record was 2:10.27. Her time was also below the maximum required to qualify for the 2016 Summer Olympics in Brazil, which is 2:10.60.

At the Olympics, she made the final of the 200 meter backstroke.
