= Kyle Micallef (swimmer) =

Maltese swimmer (born 2001)

Personal information
- Born: June 20, 2001 (age 25)

Sport
- Sport: Swimming

Kyle Micallef (born 20 June 2001) is a Maltese swimmer. He competed in the men's 50 metre freestyle event at the 2024 Summer Olympics.
