= Bryndís Rún Hansen =

Icelandic swimmer

Personal information
- Born: 9 May 1993 (age 33)

Sport
- Sport: Swimming

Bryndís Rún Hansen (born 9 May 1993) is an Icelandic swimmer. She competed in the women's 100 metre butterfly event at the 2017 World Aquatics Championships.
