= Julien Henx =

Luxembourgish swimmer (born 1995)

Personal information
- Born: 20 June 1995 (age 31)

Sport
- Sport: Swimming
Medal record
Men's swimming
Representing Luxembourg
Games of the Small States of Europe
Gold medal – first place	2011 Liechtenstein	4×200 m freestyle
Gold medal – first place	2013 Luxembourg	4×100 m freestyle
Gold medal – first place	2013 Luxembourg	4×200 m freestyle
Gold medal – first place	2013 Luxembourg	4×100 m medley
Gold medal – first place	2015 Iceland	50 m freestyle
Gold medal – first place	2015 Iceland	100 m freestyle
Gold medal – first place	2015 Iceland	4×100 m freestyle
Gold medal – first place	2015 Iceland	4×200 m freestyle
Gold medal – first place	2015 Iceland	4×100 m medley
Gold medal – first place	2017 San Marino	50 m freestyle
Gold medal – first place	2017 San Marino	100 m freestyle
Gold medal – first place	2017 San Marino	100 m butterfly
Gold medal – first place	2017 San Marino	4×100 m freestyle
Gold medal – first place	2017 San Marino	4×200 m freestyle
Gold medal – first place	2017 San Marino	4×100 m medley
Gold medal – first place	2019 Montenegro	50 m freestyle
Gold medal – first place	2019 Montenegro	100 m freestyle
Gold medal – first place	2019 Montenegro	50 m butterfly
Gold medal – first place	2019 Montenegro	4×100 m freestyle
Gold medal – first place	2025 Andorra la Vella	4×100 m freestyle
Gold medal – first place	2025 Andorra la Vella	4×200 m freestyle
Silver medal – second place	2015 Iceland	100 m butterfly
Silver medal – second place	2019 Montenegro	100 m butterfly
Silver medal – second place	2019 Montenegro	4×100 m medley
Gold medal – first place	2025 Andorra la Vella	4×100 m medley
Bronze medal – third place	2011 Liechtenstein	4×100 m freestyle
Bronze medal – third place	2025 Andorra la Vella	50 m freestyle

Julien Henx (born 20 June 1995) is a Luxembourgish swimmer. He competed in the men's 100 metre freestyle event at the 2017 World Aquatics Championships. In 2019, he competed in swimming at the 2019 Games of the Small States of Europe held in Budva, Montenegro.
