= Pit Brandenburger =

Luxembourgish swimmer

Personal information
- Born: 6 August 1995 (age 30)

Sport
- Sport: Swimming

Pit Brandenburger (born 6 August 1995) is a Luxembourgish swimmer. He competed in the men's 200 metre freestyle event at the 2017 World Aquatics Championships. In 2019, he competed in swimming at the Games of the Small States of Europe held in Budva, Montenegro.
