= Swimming at the 2011 Games of the Small States of Europe =

Swimming at the 2011 Games of the Small States of Europe was held from 31 May – 3 June 2011.

== Medal summary ==
=== Men ===
Event	Gold		Silver		Bronze	
50 m freestyle	Árni Már Árnason (ISL)	23.17	Alexandre Bakhtiarov (CYP)	23.25	Andrew Chetcuti (MLT)	23.67
100 m freestyle	Alexandre Bakhtiarov (CYP)	51.52	Andrew Chetcuti (MLT)	51.98	Árni Már Árnason (ISL)	52.33
200 m freestyle	Raphaël Stacchiotti (LUX)	1:54.06	Anton Sveinn McKee (ISL)	1:55.26	Alexandre Bakhtiarov (CYP)	1:55.43
400 m freestyle	Raphaël Stacchiotti (LUX)	4:01.03	Anton Sveinn McKee (ISL)	4:01.82	Emanuele Nicolini (SMR)	4:05.54
1500 m freestyle	Anton Sveinn McKee (ISL)	15:49.61 MR	Iacovos Hadjiconstantinou (CYP)	16:23.39	Emanuele Nicolini (SMR)	16:37.20
100 m backstroke	Jean-François Schneiders (LUX)	58.41	Davíð Hildiberg Aðalsteinsson (ISL)	58.55	Kolbeinn Aðalsteinsson (ISL)	1:00.09
200 m backstroke	Raphaël Stacchiotti (LUX)	2:05.50 MR	Jean-François Schneiders (LUX)	2:06.21	Davíð Hildiberg Aðalsteinsson (ISL)	2:09.09
100 m breaststroke	Jakob Jóhann Sveinsson (ISL)	1:02.60 MR	Laurent Carnol (LUX)	1:02.70	Árni Már Árnason (ISL)	1:03.08
200 m breaststroke	Laurent Carnol (LUX)	2:14.66 MR	Jakob Jóhann Sveinsson (ISL)	2:17.94	Hocine Haciane (AND)	2:19.45
100 m butterfly	Alexandre Bakhtiarov (CYP)	54.70	Ágúst Júlíusson (ISL)	56.77	Orri Freyr Guðmundsson (ISL)	56.98
200 m butterfly	Hocine Haciane (AND)	2:05.05	Christoph Meier (LIE)	2:08.60	Anton Sveinn McKee (ISL)	2:08.70
200 m individual medley	Raphaël Stacchiotti (LUX)	2:06.08	Hocine Haciane (AND)	2:08.39	Anton Sveinn McKee (ISL)	2:11.57
400 m individual medley	Raphaël Stacchiotti (LUX)	4:29.46	Anton Sveinn McKee (ISL)	4:31.87	Hocine Haciane (AND)	4:33.08
4 × 100 m freestyle relay	Monaco; Thomas Molina; François-Xavier Paquot; Sebastien Brillouet; Michael Aubert	3:27.33	Iceland; Árni Már Árnason; Davíð Hildiberg Aðalsteinsson; Orri Freyr Guðmundsson; Ágúst Júlíusson	3:28.89	Luxembourg; Raphaël Stacchiotti; Thibault Assini; Julien Henx; Damien Assini	3:32.98
4 × 200 m freestyle relay	Luxembourg; Jean-François Schneider; Raphaël Stacchiotti; Julien Henx; Damien Assini	7:44.18	Iceland; Anton Sveinn McKee; Davíð Hildiberg Aðalsteinsson; Orri Freyr Guðmundsson; Árni Már Árnason	7:49.12	Monaco; Thomas Molina; Sebastien Brillouet; François-Xavier Paquot; Michael Aubert	7:53.74
4 × 100 m medley relay	Iceland; Davíð Hildiberg Aðalsteinsson; Ágúst Júlíusson; Jakob Jóhann Sveinsson; Árni Már Árnason	3:48.14	Luxembourg; Raphaël Stacchiotti; Thibault Assini; Laurent Carnol; Damien Assini	3:52.96	Monaco; Michael Aubert; Sebastien Brillouet; François-Xavier Paquot; Thomas Molina	3:57.59

=== Women ===
Event	Gold		Silver		Bronze	
50 m freestyle	Ragnheiður Ragnarsdóttir (ISL)	26.13	Ingibjörg Kristín Jónsdottir (ISL)	26.32	Clelia Tini (SMR)	26.73
100 m freestyle	Ragnheiður Ragnarsdóttir (ISL)	56.61	Anna Stylianou (CYP)	56.94	Ingibjörg Kristín Jónsdottir (ISL)	58.48
200 m freestyle	Anna Stylianou (CYP)	2:02.26 MR	Julia Hassler (LIE)	2:04.05	Eygló Ósk Gústafsdóttir (ISL)	2:05.10
400 m freestyle	Anna Stylianou (CYP)	4:16.64 MR	Julia Hassler (LIE)	4:18.08	Inga Elín Cryer (ISL)	4:30.67
800 m freestyle	Julia Hassler (LIE)	8:50.99 MR	Inga Elín Cryer (ISL)	9:12.06	Eygló Ósk Gústafsdóttir (ISL)	9:15.79
100 m backstroke	Eygló Ósk Gústafsdóttir (ISL)	1:04.82	Monica Ramirez Abella (AND)	1:05.67	Ingibjörg Kristín Jónsdóttir (ISL)	1:06.33
200 m backstroke	Eygló Ósk Gústafsdóttir (ISL)	2:18.21	Monica Ramirez Abella (AND)	2:25.51	Julie Meynen (LUX)	2:25.85
100 m breaststroke	Hrafnhildur Lúthersdóttir (ISL)	1:10.92 MR	Erla Dögg Haraldsdóttir (ISL)	1:11.29	Aurelie Waltzing (LUX)	1:16.38
200 m breaststroke	Hrafnhildur Lúthersdóttir (ISL)	2:32.94	Erla Dögg Haraldsdóttir (ISL)	2:37.61	Aurelie Waltzing (LUX)	2:41.84
100 m butterfly	Maria Papadopoulos (CYP)	1:03.37	Anna Schegoleva (CYP)	1:04.19	Bryndís Rún Hansen (ISL)	1:04.48
200 m butterfly	Julia Hassler (LIE)	2:19.34	Anna Schegoleva (CYP)	2:21.67	Simona Muccioli (SMR)	2:22.23
200 m individual medley	Hrafnhildur Lúthersdóttir (ISL)	2:18.56 MR	Erla Dögg Haraldsdóttir (ISL)	2:22.15	Anna Schegoleva (CYP)	2:22.56
400 m individual medley	Jóna Helena Bjarnadóttir (ISL)	5:03.79	Julia Hassler (LIE)	5:06.01	Inga Elín Cryer (ISL)	5:06.09
4 × 100 m freestyle relay	Iceland; Ragnheiður Ragnarsdóttir; Bryndís Rún Hansen; Ingibjörg Kristín Jónsdóttir; Eygló Ósk Gústafsdóttir	3:51.03 MR	Luxembourg; Jacqueline Banky; Julie Meynen; Christine Mailliet; Charne Olivier	3:59.98	Cyprus; Anna Stylianou; Maria Papadopoulos; Anastasia Christoforou; Anna Schegoleva	4:00.48
4 × 200 m freestyle relay	Iceland; Eygló Ósk Gústafsdóttir; Ingibjörg Kristín Jónsdóttir; Bryndís Rún Hansen; Inga Elín Cryer	8:36.43	Malta; Nicola Muscat; Talisa Pace; Melinda Sue Micallef; Davina Mangion	8:58.15	Monaco; Angelique Trinquier; Johanna Vasse; Amelie Trinquier; Lucie La Pointe	9:21.90
4 × 100 m medley relay	Cyprus; Anna Schegoleva; Maria Papadopoulos; Anastasia Christoforou; Anna Stylianou	4:18.94	Iceland; Eygló Ósk Gústafsdóttir; Ingibjörg Kristín Jónsdóttir; Hrafnhildur Lúthersdóttir; Ragnheiður Ragnarsdóttir	4:19.21	Luxembourg; Julie Meynen; Christine Mailliet; Aurelie Waltzing; Jacqueline Banky	4:29.68

=== Medal table ===
After 32 events.

Rank	Nation	Gold	Silver	Bronze	Total
1	Iceland	14	14	14	42
2	Luxembourg	8	4	5	17
3	Cyprus	6	5	3	14
4	Liechtenstein	2	4	0	6
5	Andorra	1	3	2	6
6	Monaco	1	0	3	4
7	Malta	0	2	1	3
8	San Marino	0	0	4	4
Totals (8 entries)		32	32	32	96
