= Luxembourg at the 2025 World Aquatics Championships =

- Flag of Luxembourg
- World Aquatics code: LUX
- National federation: Luxembourg Swimming and Rescue Federation
- Website: flns.lu (in French)

in Singapore
- Competitors: 4 in 1 sport
- Medals: Gold 0 Silver 0 Bronze 0 Total 0

World Aquatics Championships appearances
- 1973; 1975; 1978; 1982; 1986; 1991; 1994; 1998; 2001; 2003; 2005; 2007; 2009; 2011; 2013; 2015; 2017; 2019; 2022; 2023; 2024; 2025

Luxembourg is competing at the 2025 World Aquatics Championships in Singapore from 11 July to 3 August 2025.

== Competitors ==
The following is the list of competitors in the Championships.

Sport	Men	Women	Total
Swimming	4	0	4
Total	4	0	4

== Swimming ==
Men

Athlete	Event	Heat		Semifinal		Final	
Athlete	Event	Time	Rank	Time	Rank	Time	Rank
Joao Carneiro	50 m breaststroke	28.57	53	Did not advance			
Joao Carneiro	100 m breaststroke	1:02.38	44	Did not advance			
Ralph Daleiden Ciuferri	100 m freestyle	49.08	33	Did not advance			
Ralph Daleiden Ciuferri	200 m freestyle	1:47.74 NR	25	Did not advance			
Remi Fabiani	50 m freestyle	22.42	40	Did not advance			
Remi Fabiani	50 m backstroke	26.02	47	Did not advance			
Remi Fabiani	100 m backstroke	56.39	42	Did not advance			
Julien Henx	50 m butterfly	24.12	42	Did not advance			
Julien Henx	100 m butterfly	55.57	55	Did not advance			
Joao Carneiro; Ralph Daleiden Ciuferri; Remi Fabiani; Julien Henx	4 × 100 m freestyle relay	3:21.39	20	—		Did not advance	
Joao Carneiro; Ralph Daleiden Ciuferri; Remi Fabiani; Julien Henx	4 × 100 m medley relay	3:40.99 NR	22	—		Did not advance	
