= Swimming at the 2009 Games of the Small States of Europe =

European sports competition event

Swimming at the 13th Games of the Small States of Europe was held June 2–5, 2009 at the Limassol Swimming Pool in Limassol, Cyprus. The competition featured 32 events, swum in a long course (50 m) pool. Events for both sexes, by stroke, were:

- freestyle: 50, 100, 200, 400, 800 (women only), and 1500 (men only);
- backstroke: 100 and 200;
- breaststroke: 100 and 200;
- butterfly: 100 and 200;
- individual medley (I.M.): 200 and 400;
- relays: 4 × 100 free, 4 × 200 free, and 4 × 100 medley

Of note about the competition: every women's Games record was bettered, except one (the 200 fly); and all eight participating countries at the Games had swimmers: Andorra, Cyprus, Iceland, Liechtenstein, Luxembourg, Malta (women only), Monaco and San Marino.

== Competition schedule ==
session	Tuesday 2 June 2009	Wednesday 3 June 2009	Thursday 4 June 2009	Friday 5 June 2009
preliminary heats ---- 10:00	200 back (w); 100 free (w); 100 free (m); 200 IM (m)	100 back (w); 400 free (w); 100 breast (m); 100 fly (m)	50 free (w); 200 free (w); 200 free (m)	none
finals ---- 18:00	200 back (w); 200 back (m); 200 fly (w); 200 fly (m); 100 free (w); 100 free (m); 200 IM (w); 200 IM (m)	100 back (w); 100 back (m); 400 free (w); 400 free (m); 100 fly (w); 100 fly (m); 100 breast (w); 100 breast (m); 4 × 200 free relay (w); 4 × 200 free relay (m)	50 free (w); 50 free (m); 200 breast (w); 200 breast (m); 200 free (w); 200 free (m); 4 × 100 medley relay (w); 4 × 100 medley relay (m)	800 free (w); 1500 free (m); 400 IM (w); 400 IM (m); 4 × 100 free relay (w); 4 × 100 free relay (m)

== Results ==
=== Men ===
Event	Gold		Silver		Bronze	
50 free	Árni Már Árnason; Iceland	22.87; GR	Raphaël Stacchiotti; Luxembourg	23.57	François-Xavier Paquot; Monaco	23.84
100 free	Raphaël Stacchiotti; Luxembourg	50.80	Alexandre Bakhtiarov; Cyprus	51.36	Árni Már Árnason; Iceland	51.39
200 free	Raphaël Stacchiotti; Luxembourg	1:50.35; GR	Alexandre Bakhtiarov; Cyprus	1:53.44	François-Xavier Paquot; Monaco	1:54.32
400 free	Raphaël Stacchiotti; Luxembourg	4:00.30	Emanuele Nicolini; San Marino	4:04.25	Sindri Þór Jakobsson; Iceland	4:06.14
1500 free	Sindri Þór Jakobsson; Iceland	16:17.74	Emanuele Nicolini; San Marino	16:27.29	Marios Papagiannopoulos; Cyprus	16:28.45
100 back	Raphaël Stacchiotti; Luxembourg	57.05; GR	Davíð Hildiberg Aðalsteinsson; Iceland	58.03	Marios Panagi; Cyprus	1:00.13
200 back	Raphaël Stacchiotti; Luxembourg	2:06.37	Davíð Hildiberg Aðalsteinsson; Iceland	2:10.48	Giannis Zinonos; Cyprus	2:11.52
100 breast	Jakob Jóhann Sveinsson; Iceland	1:02.75; GR	Árni Már Árnason; Iceland	1:02.85	Hocine Haciane Constantin; Andorra	1:03.54
200 breast	Jakob Jóhann Sveinsson; Iceland	2:16.34	Hocine Haciane Constantin; Andorra	2:17.10	Árni Már Árnason; Iceland	2:21.55
100 fly	Alexandre Bakhtiarov; Cyprus	54.80	Birkir Már Jónsson; Iceland	56.40	Sebastien Brillouet; Monaco	57.67
200 fly	Sindri Þór Jakobsson; Iceland	2:03.58; GR	Hocine Haciane Constantin; Andorra	2:03.79	Pietro Paolo Camilloni; San Marino	2:10.47
200 I.M.	Raphaël Stacchiotti; Luxembourg	2:04.36; GR	Hocine Haciane Constantin; Andorra	2:09.29	Sebastien Brillouet; Monaco	2:16.28
400 I.M.	Raphaël Stacchiotti; Luxembourg	4:28.78; GR	Hocine Haciane Constantin; Andorra	4:35.77	Jakob Jóhann Sveinsson; Iceland	4:41.15
4x100 free relay	Iceland; Bragi Thorsteinsson, Davíð Hildiberg Aðalsteinsson, Birkir Már Jónsson, Árni Már Árnason	3:28.80	Monaco; Tomas Molina, Sebastien Brillouet, François-Xavier Paquot, Cedric Rousseau	3:32.49	San Marino; Pietro Paolo Camilloni, Alberto Tasini, Juan Cruz Guidi, Emanuele Nicolini	3:43.40
4x200 free relay	Iceland; Sindri Þór Jakobsson, Davíð Hildiberg Aðalsteinsson, Árni Már Árnason, Birkir Mar Jonsson	7:45.15	Cyprus; Nicolas Aresti, Marios Papagiannopoulos, Alexandros Papagiannopoulos, Alexandre Bakhtiarov	7:51.07	(Monaco) Monoco; Tomas Molina, Cedric Rousseau, François-Xavier Paquot, Sebastien Brillouet	7:52.83
4x100 medley relay	Iceland; Davíð Hildiberg Aðalsteinsson, Jakob Jóhann Sveinsson, Birkir Már Jónsson, Árni Már Árnason	3:49.99	Cyprus; Marios Panagi, Georgios Lagos, Alexandre Bakhtiarov, Alexandros Arestis	4:01.39	San Marino; Alberto Tasini, Mattia Guerra, Pietro Paolo Camilloni, Emanuele Nicolini	4:21.25

=== Women ===
Event	Gold		Silver		Bronze	
50 free	Ragnheiður Ragnarsdóttir; Iceland	25.62; GR	Ingibjörg Jónsdóttir; Iceland	26.69	Rania Pavlou; Cyprus	26.98
100 free	Ragnheiður Ragnarsdóttir; Iceland	55.97; GR	Anna Stylianou; Cyprus	56.47	Christine Mailliet; Luxembourg	58.02
200 free	Anna Stylianou; Cyprus	2:02.28; GR	Christine Mailliet; Luxembourg	2:05.10	Sigrún Brá Sverrisdóttir; Iceland	2:05.73
400 free	Anna Stylianou; Cyprus	4:19.36; GR	Julia Hassler; Liechtenstein	4:21.34	Sigrún Brá Sverrisdóttir; Iceland	4:24.95
800 free	Julia Hassler; Liechtenstein	8:52.18; GR	Anna Stylianou; Cyprus	9:08.63	Sigrún Brá Sverrisdóttir; Iceland	9:15.67
100 back	Sarah Rolko; Luxembourg	1:03.32; GR	Sarah Blake Bateman; Iceland	1:04.76	Dana Gales; Luxembourg	1:05.70
200 back	Sarah Rolko; Luxembourg	2:15.77; GR	Jóhanna Gerða Gústafsdóttir; Iceland	2:19.82	Dana Gales; Luxembourg	2:21.74
100 breast	Hrafnhildur Lúthersdóttir; Iceland	1:11.21; GR	Erla Dögg Haraldsdóttir; Iceland	1:12.88	Anastasia Christoforou; Cyprus	1:13.12
200 breast	Hrafnhildur Lúthersdóttir; Iceland	2:32.29; GR	Erla Dögg Haraldsdóttir; Iceland	2:36.16	Aurelie Waltzing; Luxembourg	2:44.21
100 fly	Anna Schoholeva; Cyprus	1:01.00; GR	Sarah Blake Bateman; Iceland	1:02.72	Christine Mailliet; Luxembourg	1:02.94
200 fly	Simona Muccioli; San Marino	2:18.21	Anna Schoholeva; Cyprus	2:19.56	Julia Hassler; Liechtenstein	2:21.03
200 I.M.	Hrafnhildur Lúthersdóttir; Iceland	2:19.48; GR	Erla Dögg Haraldsdóttir; Iceland	2:22.84	Simona Muccioli; San Marino	2:27.28
400 I.M.	Inga Elín Cryer; Iceland	5:03.56; GR	Julia Hassler; Liechtenstein	5:05.82	Simona Muccioli; San Marino	5:09.45
4x100 free relay	Iceland; Ragnheiður Ragnarsdóttir, Sarah Blake Bateman, Ingibjörg Jónsdóttir, Jóhanna Gerða Gústafsdóttir	3:52.06; GR	Luxembourg; Christine Mailliet, Sarah Rolko, Kim Nickels, Dana Gales	3:59.05	Cyprus; Rania Pavlou, Anastasia Christoforou, Stella Papamiltiadous, Anna Stylianou	4:03.57
4x200 free relay	Iceland; Sigrún Brá Sverrisdóttir, Ingibjörg Jónsdóttir, Sarah Blake Bateman, Jóhanna Gerða Gústafsdóttir	8:33.25; GR, NR	Luxembourg; Christine Mailliet, Sarah Rolko, Christina Roch, Dana Gales	8:37.86	Cyprus; Rania Pavlou, Anna Schoholeva, Marilena Georgiou, Anna Stylianou	8:39.16
4x100 medley relay	Iceland; Jóhanna Gerða Gústafsdóttir, Hrafnhildur Lúthersdóttir, Sarah Blake Bateman, Ragnheiður Ragnarsdóttir	4:15.26; GR, NR	Cyprus; Sofia Papadopoulou, Anastasia Christoforou, Anna Schoholeva, Anna Stylianou	4:21.54	Luxembourg; Sarah Rolko, Aurelie Waltzing, Christine Mailliet, Kim Nickels	4:23.29

=== Medal standings ===
Rank	Nation	Gold	Silver	Bronze	Total
1	Iceland (ISL)	17	11	7	35
2	Luxembourg (LUX)	9	4	6	19
3	Cyprus (CYP)	4	8	7	19
4	Liechtenstein (LIE)	1	2	1	4
5	Andorra (AND)	0	4	1	5
6	San Marino (SMR)	0	2	5	7
7	Monaco (MON)	0	1	5	6
Totals (7 entries)		31	32	32	95

Note: Malta was the only country not to medal in Swimming.
