= List of Icelandic records in swimming =

The Icelandic records in swimming are the fastest-ever performances by an Iceland swimmer. The records are recognised and ratified by the Icelandic Swimming Association (Sundsamband Íslands - SSÍ). SSÍ maintains records in both long course (50m) and short course (25m) pools, in the following distances and strokes:

- freestyle (in Icelandic= skrið): 50, 100, 200, 400, 800 and 1500.
- backstroke (bak): 50, 100 and 200.
- breaststroke (bringa): 50, 100 and 200.
- butterfly (flug): 50, 100 and 200.
- Individual Medley (fjór): 100 (25m only), 200 and 400.
- relays (boðsund): 4x50 free (25m only), 4x100 free, 4x200 free, 4x50 medley (25m only), and 4x100 medley. (Club and national team categories for all.)

Note: fjór is Icelandic for "four". Also, the stroke order in the SSÍ report has breast before back.

All records were set in finals unless noted otherwise.

== Long Course (50m) ==
=== Men ===
Event	Time		Name	Club	Date	Meet	Location	Ref
50 m freestyle	22.53		Árni Már Árnason	Iceland	6 June 2012	Mare Nostrum	Canet-en-Roussillon, France	
100 m freestyle	49.97		Örn Arnarson	Iceland	5 June 2007	Mare Nostrum	Monaco	
200 m freestyle	1:49.78	h	Örn Arnarson	Iceland	17 September 2000	Olympic Games	Sydney, Australia	
400 m freestyle	3:54.36		Anton Sveinn McKee	-	18 July 2014	-	Los Angeles, United States	
800 m freestyle	8:08.09	†	Anton Sveinn McKee	Ægir	13 April 2012	-	Reykjavík, Iceland	
1500 m freestyle	15:27.08		Anton Sveinn McKee	Ægir	13 April 2012	-	Reykjavík, Iceland	
50 m backstroke	25.86	sf	Örn Arnarson	Iceland	20 March 2008	European Championships	Eindhoven, Netherlands	
100 m backstroke	54.75		Örn Arnarson	Iceland	23 July 2001	World Championships	Fukuoka, Japan	
200 m backstroke	1:58.37	NR	Örn Arnarson	Iceland	27 July 2001	World Championships	Fukuoka, Japan	
50m breaststroke	27.46	h	Anton Sveinn McKee	Iceland	23 July 2019	World Championships	Gwangju, South Korea	
100m breaststroke	1:00.21		Anton Sveinn McKee	Iceland	12 April 2024	Icelandic Championships	Reykjavík, Iceland	
200m breaststroke	2:08.74	sf	Anton Sveinn McKee	Iceland	22 June 2022	World Championships	Budapest, Hungary	
50m butterfly	23.99		Birnir Hálfdánarsson	Sundfélag Hafnarfjarðar	13 April 2025	Icelandic Championships	Reykjavík, Iceland	
100m butterfly	53.29		Birnir Hálfdánarsson	Sundfélag Hafnarfjarðar	11 April 2025	Icelandic Championships	Reykjavík, Iceland	
200m butterfly	2:02.97	h	Sindri Þór Jakobsson	Iceland	9 July 2009	European Junior; Championships	Prague, Czech Republic	
200m individual medley	2:04.05		Birnir Hálfdánarsson	SH	2 April 2023	Icelandic Championships	Reykjavík, Iceland	
400m individual medley	4:23.99	h	Anton Sveinn McKee	Iceland	4 August 2013	World Championships	Barcelona, Spain	
4×100m freestyle relay	3:25.01		Gudmundur Rafnsson (51.99); Ýmir Sölvason (51.14); Birnir Hálfdánarsson (51.46); Simon Statkevicius (50.42)	Iceland	27 May 2025	Games of the Small States of Europe	Andorra la Vella, Andorra	
4×200m freestyle relay	7:39.15		Davíð H. Aðalsteinsson (1:54.90); Aron Örn Stefánsson (1:55.79); Daniel Hannes Pálsson (1:54.70); Anton Sveinn McKee (1:53.76)	Iceland	29 May 2013	Games of the Small States of Europe	Luxembourg, Luxembourg	
4×200m freestyle relay	7:37.92	#	Birnir Hálfdánarsson (1:54.91); Hólmar Grétarsson (1:53.99); Magnús Jónsson (1:56.20); Ýmir Sölvason (1:52.82)	Sundfélag Hafnarfjarðar	27 March 2026	Icelandic Championships	Reykjavík, Iceland	
4×100m medley relay	3:43.14		Gudmundur Rafnsson (56.60); Snorri Einarsson (1:02.28); Birnir Hálfdánarsson (53.98); Simon Statkevicius (50.28)	Iceland	28 May 2025	Games of the Small States of Europe	Andorra la Vella, Andorra	
4×100m medley relay	3:42.35	h, #	Gudmundur Rafnsson (55.94); Einar Ágústsson (1:01.38); Birnir Hálfdánarsson (54.27); Simon Statkevicius (50.76)	Iceland	16 August 2026	European Championships	Paris, France	

Legend: # – Record awaiting ratification by SSÍ; WR – World record; ER – European record; NR – Nordic record; e – equalled existing record;
Records not set in finals: h – heat; sf – semifinal; r – relay 1st leg; rh – relay heat 1st leg; b – B final; † – en route to final mark; so – swim-off; tt – time trial

=== Women ===
Event	Time		Name	Club	Date	Meet	Location	Ref
50m freestyle	25.24	sf, so	Sarah Bateman	Iceland	26 May 2012	European Championships	Debrecen, Hungary	
100m freestyle	54.74	h	Snæfríður Jórunnardóttir	Iceland	27 July 2023	World Championships	Fukuoka, Japan	
200m freestyle	1:57.85		Snæfríður Jórunnardóttir	Iceland	20 June 2024	European Championships	Belgrade, Serbia	
400m freestyle	4:17.79		Snæfríður Jórunnardóttir	Iceland	29 May 2025	Games of the Small States of Europe	Andorra la Vella, Andorra	
800m freestyle	8:53.76		Sigrún Brá Sverrisdóttir	-	11 March 2012	USA Grand Prix	Columbus, United States	
1500m freestyle	17:17.61		Sigrún Brá Sverrisdóttir	Razorback; Aquatics	23 July 2011	USA Region VIII Championships	Columbia, United States	
50m backstroke	28.53	h	Ingibjörg Jónsdóttir	Iceland	26 July 2017	World Championships	Budapest, Hungary	
100m backstroke	1:00.25	h	Eygló Ósk Gústafsdóttir	Iceland	3 August 2015	World Championships	Kazan, Russia	
200m backstroke	2:08.84	sf, NR	Eygló Ósk Gústafsdóttir	Iceland	11 August 2016	Olympic Games	Rio de Janeiro, Brazil	
50m breaststroke	30.71	sf	Hrafnhildur Lúthersdóttir	Iceland	29 July 2017	World Championships	Budapest, Hungary	
100m breaststroke	1:06.45		Hrafnhildur Lúthersdóttir	Iceland	18 May 2016	European Championships	London, Great Britain	
200m breaststroke	2:22.96		Hrafnhildur Lúthersdóttir	Iceland	20 May 2016	European Championships	London, Great Britain	
50m butterfly	26.68	h	Bryndís Rún Hansen	Iceland	16 May 2016	European Championships	London, Great Britain	
100m butterfly	59.87	h	Sarah Bateman	Iceland	28 July 2012	Olympic Games	London, United Kingdom	
200m butterfly	2:18.79		Erla Dögg Haraldsdóttir	ÍRB	6 April 2008	-	Reykjavík, Iceland	
200m individual medley	2:13.83		Hrafnhildur Lúthersdóttir	Iceland	2 June 2015	Games of the Small States of Europe	Reykjavík, Iceland	
400m individual medley	4:46.70		Hrafnhildur Lúthersdóttir	Iceland	5 June 2015	Games of the Small States of Europe	Reykjavík, Iceland	
4×100m freestyle relay	3:47.27		Bryndís Hansen (55.98); Eygló Ósk Gústafsdóttir (56.72); Ingibjörg Jónsdóttir (57.34); Jóhanna Gerða Gústafsdóttir (57.23)	Iceland	5 June 2015	Games of the Small States of Europe	Reykjavík, Iceland	
4×200m freestyle relay	8:20.96		Bryndís Rún Hansen (2:03.80); Inga Elín Cryer (2:06.43); Ingibjörg Jónsdóttir (2:06.32); Jóhanna Gerða Gústafsdóttir (2:04.41)	Iceland	3 June 2015	Games of the Small States of Europe	Reykjavík, Iceland	
4×100m medley relay	4:04.43	h	Eygló Ósk Gústafsdóttir (1:00.42); Hrafnhildur Lúthersdóttir (1:06.99); Jóhanna Gústafsdóttir (1:01.88); Bryndís Hansen (55.14)	Iceland	9 August 2015	World Championships	Kazan, Russia	

Legend: # – Record awaiting ratification by SSÍ; WR – World record; ER – European record; NR – Nordic record; e – equalled existing record;
Records not set in finals: h – heat; sf – semifinal; r – relay 1st leg; rh – relay heat 1st leg; b – B final; † – en route to final mark; so – swim-off; tt – time trial

=== Mixed relay ===
Event	Time		Name	Club	Date	Meet	Location	Ref
4×50 m freestyle relay	1:40.32		Aron Örn Stefánsson (23.65); Predrag Milos (23.93); Ingibjörg Jónsdóttir (26.45); Hrafnhildur Lúthersdóttir (26.29)	Sundfélag Hafnarfjarðar	24 April 2016	Icelandic Championships	Reykjavík, Iceland	
4×100 m freestyle relay	3:34.65	h	Birnir Hálfdánarsson (51.54); Gudmundur Rafnsson (50.89); Snæfríður Jórunnardóttir (55.19); Jóhanna Guðmundsdóttir (57.03)	Iceland	2 August 2025	World Championships	Singapore, Singapore	
4×50 m medley relay	1:51.33		Kolbeinn Hrafnkelsson (27.46); Predrag Milos (26.46); Hrafnhildur Lúthersdóttir (31.27); Ingibjörg Jónsdóttir (26.14)	Sundfelag Hafnarfjardar	10 April 2015	Icelandic Championships	Reykjavík, Iceland	
4×100 m medley relay	3:54.91		Gudmundur Rafnsson (56.67); Einar Agustsson (1:01.46); Johanna Gudmundsdottir (1:01.50); Snaefriou Jorunnardóttir (55.28)	Iceland	30 May 2025	Games of the Small States of Europe	Andorra la Vella, Andorra	

Legend: # – Record awaiting ratification by SSÍ; WR – World record; ER – European record; NR – Nordic record; e – equalled existing record;
Records not set in finals: h – heat; so – swim-off

== Short Course (25m) ==
=== Men ===
Event	Time		Name	Club	Date	Meet	Location	Ref
50m freestyle	21.75		Símon Statkevicius	Sundfelag Hafnarfjardar	7 November 2025	Icelandic Championships	Reykjavík, Iceland	
50m freestyle	21.73	#	Símon Statkevicius	Sundfelag Hafnarfjardar	24 October 2026	Cube Meet SH	Hafnarfjörður, Iceland	
100m freestyle	48.42		Örn Arnarson	Sundfélag; Hafnarfjarðar	16 November 2007	Icelandic Championships	Reykjavík, Iceland	
200m freestyle	1:46.72		Örn Arnarson	Iceland	10 December 1999	European Championships	Lisbon, Portugal	
400m freestyle	3:47.83	h	Anton Sveinn McKee	Iceland	14 December 2012	World Championships	Istanbul, Turkey	
800m freestyle	7:52.84	†	Anton Sveinn McKee	Iceland	16 December 2012	World Championships	Istanbul, Turkey	
1500m freestyle	15:00.51		Anton Sveinn McKee	Iceland	16 December 2012	World Championships	Istanbul, Turkey	
50m backstroke	24.05		Örn Arnarson	Iceland	14 December 2007	European Championships	Debrecen, Hungary	
100m backstroke	51.74		Örn Arnarson	Iceland	14 December 2003	European Championships	Dublin, Ireland	
200m backstroke	1:52.90		Örn Arnarson	Iceland	14 December 2000	European Championships	Valencia, Spain	
50m breaststroke	26.14	=NR	Anton Sveinn McKee	Iceland	4 December 2019	European Championships	Glasgow, Great Britain	
100m breaststroke	56.30	NR	Anton Sveinn McKee	Toronto Titans	25 October 2020	International Swimming League	Budapest, Hungary	
200m breaststroke	2:01.65	NR	Anton Sveinn McKee	Toronto Titans	1 November 2020	International Swimming League	Budapest, Hungary	
50m butterfly	23.55		Örn Arnarson	Iceland	10 December 2006	European Championships	Helsinki, Finland	
100m butterfly	52.41		Birnir Halfdanarsson	Sundfelag Hafnarfjardar	7 November 2025	Icelandic Championships	Reykjavík, Iceland	
200m butterfly	1:57.21	h	Sindri Þór Jakobsson	Iceland	12 December 2009	European Championships	Istanbul, Turkey	
100m individual medley	53.85	h	Kristinn Þórarinsson	Rvk	8 November 2019	Icelandic Championships	Hafnarfjörður, Iceland	
200m individual medley	1:57.91		Örn Arnarson	ÍRB	21 March 2003	?	Vestmannaeyjar, Iceland	
200m individual medley	1:57.57	#	Birnir Halfdanarsson	Sundfelag Hafnarfjardar	24 October 2026	Cube Meet SH	Hafnarfjörður, Iceland	
400m individual medley	4:11.78		Örn Arnarson	Sundfélag; Hafnarfjarðar	17 March 2001	?	Vestmannaeyjar, Iceland	
4×50m freestyle relay	1:31.07	h	Aron Örn Stefánsson (22.87); Viktor Máni Vilbergsson (22.82); Kristinn Þórarinsson (22.95); Davíð Hildiberg Aðalsteinsson (22.43)	Iceland	9 December 2016	World Championships	Windsor, Canada	
4×100m freestyle relay	3:17.16		Birnir Halfdanarsson (49.39); Veigar Sigthorsson (50.27); Ymir Solvason (48.88); Simon Statkevicius (48.62)	Sundfelag Hafnarfjardar	8 November 2025	Icelandic Championships	Reykjavík, Iceland	
4×200m freestyle relay	7:17.51		Ymir Solvason (1:48.62); Birnir Halfdanarsson (1:48.73); Magnus Jonsson (1:50.93); Veigar Sigthorsson (1:49.23)	Sundfelag Hafnarfjardar	9 November 2024	Icelandic Championships	Hafnarfjörður, Iceland	
4×50m medley relay	1:36.97	h	Kolbeinn Hrafnkelsson (24.90); Anton Sveinn McKee (25.72); Kristinn Þórarinsson (23.94); Dadó Fenrir Jasminuson (22.41)	Iceland	8 December 2019	European Championships	Glasgow, United Kingdom	
4×100m medley relay	3:33.68	h	Guðmundur Leo Rafnsson (53.19); Snorri Einarsson (58.59); Birnir Halfdanarsson (53.03); Simon Statkevicius (48.87)	Iceland	15 December 2024	World Championships	Budapest, Hungary	

Legend: # – Record awaiting ratification by SSÍ; WR – World record; ER – European record; NR – Nordic record; e – equalled existing record;
Records not set in finals: h – heat; sf – semifinal; r – relay 1st leg; rh – relay heat 1st leg; b – B final; † – en route to final mark; so – swim-off; tt – time trial

=== Women ===
Event	Time		Name	Club	Date	Meet	Location	Ref
50m freestyle	24.68	rh	Snaefriou Jorunnardóttir	Iceland	2 December 2025	European Championships	Lublin, Poland	
100m freestyle	52.68	sf	Snaefriou Jorunnardóttir	Iceland	11 December 2024	World Championships	Budapest, Hungary	
200m freestyle	1:53.78	sf	Snaefriou Jorunnardóttir	Iceland	3 December 2025	European Championships	Lublin, Poland	
400m freestyle	4:11.61	h	Inga Elín Cryer	Iceland	5 December 2014	World Championships	Doha, Qatar	
800m freestyle	8:38.79		Inga Elín Cryer	Iceland	4 December 2014	World Championships	Doha, Qatar	
1500m freestyle	16:46.95		Eygló Ósk Gústafsdóttir	Ægir	27 October 2012	?	Hafnarfjörður, Iceland	
50m backstroke	27.40	rh	Eygló Ósk Gústafsdóttir	Iceland	7 December 2016	World Championships	Windsor, Canada	
100m backstroke	57.42		Eygló Ósk Gústafsdóttir	Iceland	3 December 2015	European Championships	Netanya, Israel	
200m backstroke	2:03.53		Eygló Ósk Gústafsdóttir	Iceland	4 December 2015	European Championships	Netanya, Israel	
50m breaststroke	30.03	=, sf	Hrafnhildur Lúthersdóttir	Iceland	13 December 2017	European Championships	Copenhagen, Denmark	
50m breaststroke	30.03	=	Hrafnhildur Lúthersdóttir	Iceland	13 December 2017	European Championships	Copenhagen, Denmark	
100m breaststroke	1:05.67	sf	Hrafnhildur Lúthersdóttir	Iceland	9 December 2016	World Championships	Windsor, Canada	
200m breaststroke	2:22.69	h	Hrafnhildur Lúthersdóttir	Iceland	7 December 2014	World Championships	Doha, Qatar	
50m butterfly	26.22	h	Bryndís Rún Hansen	Iceland	8 December 2016	World Championships	Windsor, Canada	
100m butterfly	59.95	h	Bryndís Rún Hansen	Iceland	10 December 2016	World Championships	Windsor, Canada	
200m butterfly	2:12.95	h	Inga Elín Cryer	Iceland	4 December 2015	European Championships	Netanya, Israel	
100m individual medley	1:00.31	sf	Hrafnhildur Lúthersdóttir	Iceland	8 December 2016	World Championships	Windsor, Canada	
200m individual medley	2:11.57		Hrafnhildur Lúthersdóttir	Sundfélag; Hafnarfjarðar	13 November 2015	Icelandic Championships	Hafnarfjörður, Iceland	
400m individual medley	4:43.56		Hrafnhildur Lúthersdóttir	Sundfélag; Hafnarfjarðar	15 November 2015	Icelandic Championships	Hafnarfjörður, Iceland	
4×50m freestyle relay	1:40.61	h	Snaefriou Jorunnardóttir (24.68); Johanna Gudmundsdottir (25.19); Vala Cicero (24.98); Birgitta Ingolfsdottir (25.76)	Iceland	2 December 2025	European Championships	Lublin, Poland	
4×100m freestyle relay	3:45.58		Johanna Gudmundsdottir (55.69); Nadja Djurovic (56.35); Katja Andriysdottir (59.22); Vala Dis Cicero (54.32)	SH	9 November 2024	Icelandic Championships	Hafnarfjörður, Iceland	
4×200m freestyle relay	8:14.55		Nadja Djurovic (2:06.03); Katja Andriysdottir (2:05.09); Johanna Gudmundsdottir (2:04.07); Vala Dis Cicero (1:59.36)	SH	9 November 2024	Icelandic Championships	Hafnarfjörður, Iceland	
4×50m medley relay	1.49.41	h	Eygló Ósk Gústafsdóttir (27.40); Hrafnhildur Lúthersdóttir (30.04); Bryndís Rún Hansen (26.01); Johanna Gustafsdóttir (25.96)	Iceland	7 December 2016	World Championships	Windsor, Canada	
4×100m medley relay	4:00.08	h	Eygló Ósk Gústafsdóttir (58.14); Hrafnhildur Lúthersdóttir (1:06.20); Bryndís Rún Hansen (59.71); Johanna Gustafsdóttir (56.03)	Iceland	11 December 2016	World Championships	Windsor, Canada	

Legend: # – Record awaiting ratification by SSÍ; WR – World record; ER – European record; NR – Nordic record; e – equalled existing record;
Records not set in finals: h – heat; sf – semifinal; r – relay 1st leg; rh – relay heat 1st leg; b – B final; † – en route to final mark; so – swim-off; tt – time trial

=== Mixed relay ===
Event	Time		Name	Club	Date	Meet	Location	Ref
4×50 m freestyle relay	1:33.36	h	Símon Statkevicius (21.74); Ymir Chatenay-Solvason (22.10); Johanna Gúomundsdóttir (24.65); Vala Cicero (24.87)	Iceland	4 December 2025	European Championships	Lublin, Poland	
4×100 m freestyle relay	3:39.86		Árni Már Árnason (51.18); Kristófer Sigurðsson (50.25); Sunneva Dögg Robertson (58.49); Eydís Ósk Kolbeinsdóttir (59.94)	ÍBR	20 November 2016	Icelandic Championships	Hafnarfjörður, Iceland	
4×50 m medley relay	1:43.84	h	Davíð Hildiberg Aðalsteinsson (25.15); Hrafnhildur Lúthersdóttir (30.00); Bryndís Rún Hansen (26.17); Aron Orn Stefansson (22.52)	Iceland	8 December 2016	World Championships	Windsor, Canada	
4×100 m medley relay	3:45.01	h	Guðmundur Rafnsson (53.14); Einar Ágústsson (57.95); Jóhanna Guðmundsdóttir (1:00.90); Snæfríður Jórunnardóttir (53.02)	Iceland	14 December 2024	World Championships	Budapest, Hungary	

Legend: # – Record awaiting ratification by SSÍ; WR – World record; ER – European record; NR – Nordic record; e – equalled existing record;
Records not set in finals: h – heat; so – swim-off
