= Swimming at the 2012 European Aquatics Championships – Women's 100 metre freestyle =

Women's 100 metre freestyle at the 2012 European Aquatics Championships
- Dates: May 22, 2012 (heats and semifinals); May 23, 2012 (final)
- Competitors: 61 from 30 nations
- Winning time: 53.61

Medalists
gold medal	Sarah Sjöström	Sweden
silver medal	Britta Steffen	Germany
bronze medal	Daniela Schreiber	Germany

The women's 100 metre freestyle competition of the swimming events at the 2012 European Aquatics Championships took place May 22, 2012 (heats) and May 23, 2012 (final).

== Records ==
Prior to the competition, the existing world, European and championship records were as follows.

	Name	Nation	Time	Location	Date
World record European record	Britta Steffen	Germany	52.07	Rome	July 31, 2009
Championship record	Britta Steffen	Germany	53.30	Budapest	August 2, 2006

== Results ==
=== Heats ===
62 swimmers participated in 8 heats.

Rank	Heat	Lane	Name	Nationality	Time	Notes
1	7	4	Britta Steffen	Germany	54.65	Q
2	8	4	Sarah Sjöström	Sweden	54.68	Q
3	6	4	Daniela Schreiber	Germany	54.69	Q
4	7	3	Hanna-Maria Seppälä	Finland	55.40	Q
5	7	5	Gabriella Fagundez	Sweden	55.46	Q
6	8	5	Ida Marko-Varga	Sweden	55.52	
7	6	5	Silke Lippok	Germany	55.57	
8	6	3	Michelle Coleman	Sweden	55.59	
9	8	1	Birgit Koschischek	Austria	55.63	Q
10	7	2	Alice Mizzau	Italy	55.64	Q
11	5	2	Katarína Filová	Slovakia	55.66	Q
12	5	1	Nery Mantey Niangkouara	Greece	55.68	Q
13	6	1	Erika Ferraioli	Italy	55.69	Q
14	7	6	Burcu Dolunay	Turkey	55.84	Q
15	8	6	Hinkelien Schreuder	Netherlands	55.85	Q
16	4	4	Nastja Govejšek	Slovenia	55.92	Q
17	4	5	Eszter Dara	Hungary	55.92	Q
18	5	4	Miroslava Najdanovski	Serbia	55.97	Q
19	7	7	Nina Rangelova	Bulgaria	55.98	Q
20	6	2	Theodora Drakou	Greece	55.99	
21	8	8	Sara Isaković	Slovenia	56.08	
22	6	7	Evelyn Verrasztó	Hungary	56.10	
23	6	6	Darya Stepanyuk	Ukraine	56.14	
24	5	5	Erica Buratto	Italy	56.15	
24	7	1	Cecilie Johannessen	Norway	56.15	
26	7	8	Yuliya Khitraya	Belarus	56.18	
27	6	8	Aksana Dziamidava	Belarus	56.19	
28	8	7	Mylène Lazare	France	56.23	
29	4	7	Miroslava Syllabová	Slovakia	56.38	
30	4	1	Eva Hannesdóttir	Iceland	56.42	
31	4	3	Henriette Brekke	Norway	56.46	
32	8	2	Ágnes Mutina	Hungary	56.60	
33	3	4	Danielle Carmen Villars	Switzerland	56.67	
34	5	6	Maria Ugolkova	Russia	56.75	
35	3	6	Laura Kurki	Finland	56.81	
36	4	6	Sarah Blake Bateman	Iceland	57.03	
36	5	3	Theodora Giareni	Greece	57.03	
38	3	7	Bethany Carson	Ireland	57.06	
39	2	3	Urša Bežan	Slovenia	57.15	
40	5	7	Ragnheidur Ragnarsdóttir	Iceland	57.25	
41	4	8	Anna Stylianou	Cyprus	57.27	
42	5	8	Eva Chavez-Diaz	Austria	57.35	
43	2	7	Jūratė Ščerbinskaitė	Lithuania	57.59	
44	3	3	Monica Johannessen	Norway	57.60	
45	2	1	Gabriela Ņikitina	Latvia	57.61	NR
46	2	6	Vaiva Gimbutytė	Lithuania	57.69	
46	3	2	Linda Laihorinne	Finland	57.69	
48	2	2	Sara Joo	Hungary	58.06	
49	2	8	Clelia Tini	San Marino	58.12	NR
50	2	4	Lotta Nevalainen	Finland	58.19	
51	3	5	Susann Bjørnsen	Norway	58.37	
52	2	5	Katarzyna Gorniak	Poland	58.43	
53	3	8	Valeriya Podlesna	Ukraine	58.44	
54	4	2	Yana Parakhouskaya	Belarus	58.92	
55	3	1	Ingibjørg Kristin Jonsdóttir	Iceland	59.58	
56	1	4	Anastasia Bogdanovski	Macedonia	59.70	
57	1	6	Birita Debes	Faroe Islands	1:00.47	
58	1	3	Monica Ramirez Abella	Andorra	1:01.00	
59	1	5	Milica Marković	Montenegro	1:01.10	
60	1	7	Gudrun Mortensen	Faroe Islands	1:01.62	
61	1	2	Cecilia Eysturdal	Faroe Islands	1:03.69	
	8	3	Lisa Vitting	Germany	DNS	

=== Semifinals ===
The eight fasters swimmers advanced to the final.

==== Semifinal 1 ====
Rank	Lane	Name	Nationality	Time	Notes
1	4	Sarah Sjöström	Sweden	55.14	Q
2	5	Hanna-Maria Seppälä	Finland	55.40	Q
3	1	Eszter Dara	Hungary	55.70	
4	2	Erika Ferraioli	Italy	55.88	
5	8	Nina Rangelova	Bulgaria	55.92	
6	6	Katarína Filová	Slovakia	56.00	
7	3	Birgit Koschischek	Austria	56.04	
8	7	Hinkelien Schreuder	Netherlands	56.26	

==== Semifinal 2 ====
Rank	Lane	Name	Nationality	Time	Notes
1	5	Daniela Schreiber	Germany	54.53	Q
2	4	Britta Steffen	Germany	54.71	Q
3	2	Nery-Mantey Niangkouara	Greece	54.98	Q
4	6	Alice Mizzau	Italy	55.07	Q
5	3	Gabriella Fagundez	Sweden	55.57	Q
6	8	Miroslava Najdanovski	Serbia	55.65	Q
7	7	Burcu Dolunay	Turkey	56.00	
8	1	Nastja Govejšek	Slovenia	56.05	

=== Final ===
The final was held at 18.13.

Rank	Lane	Name	Nationality	Time	Notes
1st place, gold medalist(s)	2	Sarah Sjöström	Sweden	53.61	
2nd place, silver medalist(s)	5	Britta Steffen	Germany	54.15	
3rd place, bronze medalist(s)	4	Daniela Schreiber	Germany	54.41	
4	6	Alice Mizzau	Italy	55.03	
5	3	Nery-Mantey Niangkouara	Greece	55.17	
6	1	Gabriella Fagundez	Sweden	55.51	
7	7	Hanna-Maria Seppälä	Finland	55.68	
8	8	Miroslava Najdanovski	Serbia	56.31	
