= Swimming at the 2012 European Aquatics Championships – Women's 50 metre freestyle =

Women's 50 metre freestyle at the 2012 European Aquatics Championships
- Dates: May 26, 2012 (heats and semifinals); May 27, 2012 (final)
- Competitors: 59 from 27 nations
- Winning time: 24.37

Medalists
gold medal	Britta Steffen	Germany
silver medal	Hinkelien Schreuder	Netherlands
bronze medal	Nery Mantey Niangkouara	Greece

The women's 50 metre freestyle competition of the swimming events at the 2012 European Aquatics Championships took place May 26 and 27. The heats and semifinals took place on May 26, the final on May 27.

== Records ==
Prior to the competition, the existing world, European and championship records were as follows.

	Name	Nation	Time	Location	Date
World record and European record	Britta Steffen	Germany	23.73	Rome	August 2, 2009
Championship record	Marleen Veldhuis	Netherlands	24.09	Eindhoven	March 24, 2008

== Results ==
=== Heats ===
59 swimmers participated in 8 heats.

Rank	Heat	Lane	Name	Nationality	Time	Notes
1	8	4	Britta Steffen	Germany	24.66	Q
2	6	4	Hinkelien Schreuder	Netherlands	24.92	Q
3	7	8	Anna Dowgiert	Poland	25.23	Q
4	5	2	Aleksandra Urbanczyk	Poland	25.30	Q
5	6	3	Nery Mantey Niangkouara	Greece	25.33	Q
6	6	6	Daniela Schreiber	Germany	25.35	Q
7	8	5	Sviatlana Khakhlova	Belarus	25.38	Q
8	8	3	Triin Aljand	Estonia	25.41	Q
9	7	4	Dorothea Brandt	Germany	25.42	
10	7	6	Sarah Blake Bateman	Iceland	25.43	Q, NR
11	6	5	Theodora Drakou	Greece	25.46	Q
12	6	1	Hanna-Maria Seppälä	Finland	25.46	Q
13	3	3	Eszter Dara	Hungary	25.56	Q
14	7	3	Anna Santamans	France	25.60	Q
15	8	7	Nathalie Lindborg	Sweden	25.60	Q
16	8	6	Burcu Dolunay	Turkey	25.63	Q
17	7	2	Jane Trepp	Estonia	25.64	Q
18	5	6	Erika Ferraioli	Italy	25.66	
19	6	2	Yuliya Khitraya	Belarus	25.68	
20	6	8	Henriette Brekke	Norway	25.70	NR
21	8	8	Miroslava Syllabová	Slovakia	25.70	
22	8	1	Lisa Vitting	Germany	27.73	
23	7	5	Darya Stepanyuk	Ukraine	25.80	
24	7	1	Nadiya Koba	Ukraine	25.86	
25	8	2	Jolien Sysmans	Belgium	25.87	
26	4	2	Nastja Govejšek	Slovenia	25.88	NR
27	5	4	Miroslava Najdanovski	Serbia	25.90	
28	4	1	Martina Moravcová	Slovakia	25.95	
29	5	3	Erica Buratto	Italy	25.98	
30	5	5	Laura Kurki	Finland	25.98	
31	6	7	Birgit Koschischek	Austria	26.10	
32	7	7	Ragnheiður Ragnarsdóttir	Iceland	26.14	
33	5	8	Aksana Dziamidava	Belarus	26.15	
34	5	7	Cecilie Johannessen	Norway	26.16	
35	4	7	Eva Hannesdóttir	Iceland	26.22	
36	4	6	Lotta Nevalainen	Finland	26.24	
37	4	4	Kristel Vourna	Greece	26.28	
38	4	5	Justine Bruno	France	26.29	
39	2	7	Katarína Milly	Slovakia	26.36	
40	5	1	Louise Hansson	Sweden	26.37	
41	3	4	Gabriela Ņikitina	Latvia	26.40	
42	4	8	Aneta Pechancova	Czech Republic	26.50	
43	3	2	Susann Bjørnsen	Norway	26.56	
44	3	7	Fanni Pataki	Hungary	26.64	
45	2	5	Katarína Filová	Slovakia	26.69	
46	3	1	Eva Chavez-Diaz	Austria	26.76	
47	3	6	Monica Johannessen	Norway	26.76	
48	3	5	Sandra Kazíková	Czech Republic	26.86	
49	2	4	Linda Laihorinne	Finland	26.88	
50	2	2	Clelia Tini	San Marino	26.94	
51	2	8	Klara Vaclavikova	Czech Republic	27.05	
52	2	3	Katarzyna Gorniak	Poland	27.07	
53	3	8	Ivana Gabrilo	Switzerland	27.08	
54	4	3	Ingibjørg Kristin Jonsdóttir	Iceland	27.10	
55	2	6	Hazal Sarikaya	Turkey	27.11	
56	1	5	Gudrun Mortensen	Faroe Islands	27.23	NR
57	2	1	Anastasia Bogdanovski	Macedonia	27.27	
58	1	3	Tatiana Perstniova	Moldova	27.29	
59	1	4	Birita Debes	Faroe Islands	27.94	

=== Semifinals ===
The eight fastest swimmers advanced to the final.

==== Semifinal 1 ====
Rank	Lane	Name	Nationality	Time	Notes
1	4	Hinkelien Schreuder	Netherlands	24.81	Q
2	6	Triin Aljand	Estonia	25.12	Q, =NR
3	2	Theodora Drakou	Greece	25.21	Q, NR
4	3	Daniela Schreiber	Germany	25.38	
5	5	Aleksandra Urbanczyk	Poland	25.44	
6	8	Jane Trepp	Estonia	25.47	
7	7	Hanna-Maria Seppälä	Finland	25.52	
8	1	Nathalie Lindborg	Sweden	25.53	

==== Semifinal 2 ====
Rank	Lane	Name	Nationality	Time	Notes
1	4	Britta Steffen	Germany	24.56	Q
2	3	Nery Mantey Niangkouara	Greece	25.09	Q, NR
3	1	Anna Santamans	France	25.20	Q
4	6	Sviatlana Khakhlova	Belarus	25.26	Q
5	2	Sarah Blake Bateman	Iceland	25.38	NR
5	5	Anna Dowgiert	Poland	25.38	
7	7	Eszter Dara	Hungary	25.41	
8	8	Burcu Dolunay	Turkey	26.02	

==== Swim-off ====
A swim-off was needed to determine the last participant in the final.

Rank	Lane	Name	Nationality	Time	Notes
1	5	Sarah Blake Bateman	Iceland	25.24	Q, NR
2	4	Daniela Schreiber	Germany	25.46	
3	3	Anna Dowgiert	Poland	25.54	

=== Final ===
The final was held at 17:02.

Rank	Lane	Name	Nationality	Time	Notes
1st place, gold medalist(s)	4	Britta Steffen	Germany	24.37	
2nd place, silver medalist(s)	5	Hinkelien Schreuder	Netherlands	24.78	
3rd place, bronze medalist(s)	3	Nery Mantey Niangkouara	Greece	24.93	NR
4	6	Triin Aljand	Estonia	25.01	NR
5	7	Theodora Drakou	Greece	25.05	
6	1	Sviatlana Khakhlova	Belarus	25.12	
7	2	Anna Santamans	France	25.26	
8	8	Sarah Blake Bateman	Iceland	25.38	
