= Árnason =

Árnason (also Anglicised as Arnason) is a surname of Icelandic origin, meaning son of Árni. In proper Icelandic names, it would be written with the accent acute over the initial Á. In Icelandic names, it is not strictly a surname, but a patronymic. The name refers to:

- Árni Már Árnason (born 1987), Icelandic swimmer
- Árni Páll Árnason (born 1966), Icelandic politician
- Barbara Árnason (1911–1975), English-born Icelandic artist
- Chuck Arnason (born 1951), Canadian professional ice hockey player
- David Arnason (born 1940), Canadian author and poet
- Eleanor Arnason (born 1942), American author of science-fiction novels and short stories
- Garðar Árnason (born 1938), Icelandic footballer
- H. Harvard Arnason (1909–1986), American academic, administrator, author and art historian
- Hjalti Árnason (born 1963), Icelandic strongman competitor and powerlifter
- Hörður Árnason (born 1989), Icelandic football left back
- Jón Árnason (disambiguation), multiple people, including:
  - Jón Árnason (author) (1819–1888), Icelandic author
  - Jón Loftur Árnason (born 1960), Icelandic chess grandmaster
  - Jón Gunnar Árnason (1931–1989), Icelandic sculptor
- Kálfr Árnason (c. 990–1051), Norwegian chieftain
- Kári Árnason (born 1982), Icelandic professional football player
- Kári Árnason (footballer, born 1944) (1944–2024), Icelandic professional football player
- Mörður Árnason (born 1953), Icelandic politician
- Örn Árnason (born 1959), Icelandic actor, comedian and screenwriter
- Tómas Árnason (1923–2014), Icelandic politician
- Tyler Arnason (born 1979), American professional ice hockey player
- Vilhjálmur Árnason (born 1953), Icelandic professor of philosophy, researcher in genetics, and author
- Þórólfur Árnason, Icelandic politician; mayor of Reykjavík 2003–04

== Other ==
- Árnason JFP-2S-8, 1990s Icelandic experimental aeroplane
- Árnason Global 3, 2000s Icelandic experimental aeroplane
