= Luxembourg at the 2015 World Aquatics Championships =

- Flag of Luxembourg
- FINA code: LUX
- National federation: Fédération Luxembourgeoise de Natation et de Sauvetage
- Website: www.flns.lu

in Kazan, Russia
- Competitors: 6 in 1 sport
- Medals: Gold 0 Silver 0 Bronze 0 Total 0

World Aquatics Championships appearances
- 1973; 1975; 1978; 1982; 1986; 1991; 1994; 1998; 2001; 2003; 2005; 2007; 2009; 2011; 2013; 2015; 2017; 2019; 2022; 2023; 2024

Luxembourg competed at the 2015 World Aquatics Championships in Kazan, Russia from 24 July to 9 August 2015.

== Swimming ==
Luxembourgian swimmers have achieved qualifying standards in the following events (up to a maximum of 2 swimmers in each event at the A-standard entry time, and 1 at the B-standard):

Men

| Athlete | Event | Heat | | Semifinal | | Final | |
| Athlete | Event | Time | Rank | Time | Rank | Time | Rank |
|---|---|---|---|---|---|---|---|
| Pit Brandenburger | 200 m freestyle | 1:52.12 | 58 | Did not advance | | | |
| Laurent Carnol | 50 m breaststroke | 27.94 | 22 | Did not advance | | | |
| Laurent Carnol | 100 m breaststroke | 1:00.82 | 25 | Did not advance | | | |
| Laurent Carnol | 200 m breaststroke | 2:11.65 | =18 | Did not advance | | | |
| Julian Henx | 50 m freestyle | 22.97 | 37 | Did not advance | | | |
| Julian Henx | 100 m freestyle | 50.77 | 52 | Did not advance | | | |
| Raphaël Stacchiotti | 400 m freestyle | 4:01.63 | 58 | — | | Did not advance | |
| Raphaël Stacchiotti | 100 m butterfly | 55.96 | 54 | Did not advance | | | |
| Raphaël Stacchiotti | 200 m individual medley | 2:02.60 | 23 | Did not advance | | | |
| Raphaël Stacchiotti | 400 m individual medley | DNS | | — | | Did not advance | |
| Raphaël Stacchiotti; Laurent Carnol; Julian Henx; Pit Brandenburger | 4 × 100 m medley relay | 3:44.22 | 25 | — | | Did not advance | |

Women

| Athlete | Event | Heat | | Semifinal | | Final | |
| Athlete | Event | Time | Rank | Time | Rank | Time | Rank |
|---|---|---|---|---|---|---|---|
| Julie Meynen | 50 m freestyle | 25.55 | =19 | Did not advance | | | |
| Julie Meynen | 100 m freestyle | 55.54 | 28 | Did not advance | | | |
| Monique Olivier | 200 m freestyle | 2:03.23 | 45 | Did not advance | | | |
| Monique Olivier | 400 m freestyle | 4:15.24 | 25 | — | | Did not advance | |
| Monique Olivier | 800 m freestyle | 8:45.37 | 28 | — | | Did not advance | |
| Monique Olivier | 1500 m freestyle | 16:43.21 | 19 | — | | Did not advance | |

Mixed

| Athlete | Event | Heat | | Final | |
| Athlete | Event | Time | Rank | Time | Rank |
|---|---|---|---|---|---|
| Julien Henx; Pit Brandenburger; Julie Meynen; Monique Olivier | 4 × 100 m freestyle relay | 3:35.19 | 15 | Did not advance | |
