= Luxembourg at the 2013 World Aquatics Championships =

- Flag of Luxembourg
- FINA code: LUX
- National federation: Fédération Luxembourgeoise de Natation et de Sauvetage
- Website: www.flns.lu

in Barcelona, Spain
- Competitors: 4 in 1 sports
- Medals: Gold 0 Silver 0 Bronze 0 Total 0

World Aquatics Championships appearances
- 1973; 1975; 1978; 1982; 1986; 1991; 1994; 1998; 2001; 2003; 2005; 2007; 2009; 2011; 2013; 2015; 2017; 2019; 2022; 2023; 2024

Luxembourg is competing at the 2013 World Aquatics Championships in Barcelona, Spain between 19 July and 4 August 2013.

== Swimming ==
Luxembourgian swimmers achieved qualifying standards in the following events (up to a maximum of 2 swimmers in each event at the A-standard entry time, and 1 at the B-standard):

Men

Athlete	Event	Heat		Semifinal		Final	
Athlete	Event	Time	Rank	Time	Rank	Time	Rank
Laurent Carnol	100 m breaststroke	1:00.76 NR	21	Did not advance			
Laurent Carnol	200 m breaststroke	2:10.94	9 Q	2:11.73	15	Did not advance	
Jean-François Schneiders	100 m backstroke	56.88	34	Did not advance			
Jean-François Schneiders	200 m backstroke	2:02.96	25	Did not advance			
Raphaël Stacchiotti	200 m freestyle	1:53.55	50	Did not advance			
Raphaël Stacchiotti	200 m individual medley	2:01.71	24	Did not advance			
Raphaël Stacchiotti	400 m individual medley	DNS		—		Did not advance	

Women

Athlete	Event	Heat		Semifinal		Final	
Athlete	Event	Time	Rank	Time	Rank	Time	Rank
Julie Meynen	50 m freestyle	25.74	27	Did not advance			
Julie Meynen	100 m freestyle	56.16	32	Did not advance			
