= Luxembourg at the 2017 World Aquatics Championships =

- Flag of Luxembourg
- FINA code: LUX
- National federation: Fédération Luxembourgeoise de Natation et de Sauvetage
- Website: www.flns.lu

in Budapest, Hungary
- Competitors: 7 in 2 sports
- Medals: Gold 0 Silver 0 Bronze 0 Total 0

World Aquatics Championships appearances
- 1973; 1975; 1978; 1982; 1986; 1991; 1994; 1998; 2001; 2003; 2005; 2007; 2009; 2011; 2013; 2015; 2017; 2019; 2022; 2023; 2024

Luxembourg competed at the 2017 World Aquatics Championships in Budapest, Hungary from 14 July to 30 July.

== High diving ==
Luxembourg qualified one male high diver.

Athlete	Event	Points	Rank
Alain Kohl	Men's high diving	207.30	17

== Swimming ==
Luxembourgian swimmers have achieved qualifying standards in the following events (up to a maximum of 2 swimmers in each event at the A-standard entry time, and 1 at the B-standard):

Men

Athlete	Event	Heat		Semifinal		Final	
Athlete	Event	Time	Rank	Time	Rank	Time	Rank
Pit Brandenburger	200 m freestyle	1:51.14	51	did not advance			
Laurent Carnol	100 m breaststroke	1:01.91	35	did not advance			
Laurent Carnol	200 m breaststroke	2:14.87	27	did not advance			
Julien Henx	50 m freestyle	22.98	52	did not advance			
Julien Henx	100 m freestyle	50.06	49	did not advance			
Raphaël Stacchiotti	200 m individual medley	2:01.60	23	did not advance			

Women

Athlete	Event	Heat		Semifinal		Final	
Athlete	Event	Time	Rank	Time	Rank	Time	Rank
Julie Meynen	50 m freestyle	25.67	31	did not advance			
Julie Meynen	100 m freestyle	55.99	29	did not advance			
Monique Olivier	200 m freestyle	2:03.26	31	did not advance			
Monique Olivier	400 m freestyle	4:18.04	22	—		did not advance	
Monique Olivier	800 m freestyle	8:54.27	25	—		did not advance	
