= List of Sammarinese records in swimming =

The Sammarinese records in swimming are the fastest ever performances of swimmers from San Marino, which are recognised and ratified by the San Marino Swimming Federation (FSN).

All records were set in finals unless noted otherwise.

== Long Course (50 m) ==
=== Men ===
Event	Time		Name	Club	Date	Meet	Location	Ref
50 m freestyle	24.26		Pietro Camilloni	San Marino	31 May 2011	Games of the Small States of Europe	Vaduz, Liechtenstein	
100 m freestyle	52.83		Diego Mularoni	San Marino	29 May 2001	Games of the Small States of Europe	Serravalle, San Marino	
200 m freestyle	1:52.15	h, #	Loris Bianchi	San Marino	20 June 2024	European Championships	Belgrade, Serbia	
400 m freestyle	3:55.89	h	Loris Bianchi	San Marino	23 June 2024	European Championships	Belgrade, Serbia	
800 m freestyle	8:12.19	h	Loris Bianchi	San Marino	18 June 2024	European Championships	Belgrade, Serbia	
1500 m freestyle	15:53.45		Diego Mularoni	-	6 April 2003	-	Ravenna, Italy	
5000 m freestyle	57:22.8		Emanuele Nicolini	-	26 March 2005	-	Pescara, Italy	
50 m backstroke	28.19	h	Davide Bernardi	San Marino	19 August 2014	Youth Olympic Games	Nanjing, China	
100 m backstroke	1:00.89		Davide Bernardi	-	13 July 2016	Finali Regionali Riccione	Riccione, Italy	
200 m backstroke	2:08.86		Marco Cesarini	San Marino	29 May 2001	Games of the Small States of Europe	Serravalle, San Marino	
50 m breaststroke	28.90		Giacomo Casadei	Gens Aquatica San Marino	30 July 2022	Italian Summer Championships	Rome, Italy	
100 m breaststroke	1:01.93		Giacomo Casadei	San Marino	28 May 2025	Games of the Small States of Europe	Andorra la Vella, Andorra	
200 m breaststroke	2:15.54		Giacomo Casadei	San Marino	31 May 2023	Games of the Small States of Europe	Msida, Malta	
50m butterfly	25.65		Alessandro Rebosio	Gens Aquatica San Marino	29 April 2022	Meeting Squalo Blu	Serravalle, San Marino	
100m butterfly	56.42		Alessandro Rebosio	Gens Aquatica San Marino	1 May 2022	Meeting Squalo Blu	Serravalle, San Marino	
200m butterfly	2:04.07		Alessandro Rebosio	Gens Aquatica San Marino	31 July 2022	Italian Age Group Championships	Rome, Italy	
200m individual medley	2:10.81		Giacomo Casadei	San Marino	30 May 2023	Games of the Small States of Europe	Msida, Malta	
400m individual medley	4:39.12		Giacomo Casadei	San Marino	2 June 2023	Games of the Small States of Europe	Msida, Malta	
4×100m freestyle relay	3:38.07		San Marino	2 June 2017	Games of the Small States of Europe	Serravalle, San Marino		
4×200m freestyle relay	7:52.72		Emanuele Nicolini; Matteo Cesarini; Marco Cesarini; Diego Mularoni	San Marino	30 May 2001	Games of the Small States of Europe	Serravalle, San Marino	
4×100m medley relay	4:02.78		Marco Cesarini; Danilo Zavoli; Emanuele Nicolini; Diego Mularoni	San Marino	31 May 2001	Games of the Small States of Europe	Serravalle, San Marino	

Legend: # – Record awaiting ratification by FSN; WR – World record; ER – European record;
Records not set in finals: h – heat; sf – semifinal; r – relay 1st leg; rh – relay heat 1st leg; b – B final; † – en route to final mark; so – swim-off; tt – time trial

=== Women ===
Event	Time		Name	Club	Date	Meet	Location	Ref
50m freestyle	26.58		Clelia Tini	-	2 June 2012	S.S.E. Swimming Championships	Andorra la Vella, Andorra	
100m freestyle	58.12	h	Clelia Tini	San Marino	22 May 2012	European Championships	Debrecen, Hungary	
200m freestyle	2:04.12		Sara Lettoli	Gens Acquatica	15 July 2017	Finali Campionati Regionali di Categoria Estivi	Bologna, Italy	
400m freestyle	4:21.38		Arianna Valloni	San Marino	31 May 2017	Games of the Small States of Europe	Serravalle, San Marino	
800m freestyle	8:48.79		Arianna Valloni	Pol Comunale Riccione	7 August 2021	Italian Summer Championships	Rome, Italy	
1500m freestyle	16:45.40		Arianna Valloni	San Marino	11 August 2020	Sette Colli Trophy	Rome, Italy	
5000m freestyle	59:56.30		Arianna Valloni	Nuoto Venezia	25 February 2018	Campionati Regionali di Fondo Veneto	Italy	
50m backstroke	31.26	b	Carlotta Bulzoni	San Marino	31 January 2016	3° Gran Prix d'inverno	Serravalle, San Marino	
100m backstroke	1:07.82		Carlotta Bulzoni	San Marino	31 May 2017	Games of the Small States of Europe	Serravalle, San Marino	
200m backstroke	2:28.46		Elisa Bernardi	-	3 July 2013	-	Riccione, Italy	
200m backstroke	2:22.25	#	Margherita Gregoroni	San Marino	22 August 2026	Mediterranean Games	Taranto, Italy	
50m breaststroke	36.03		Martina Savaglia	-	25 April 2008	Coppa Latina	Serravalle, San Marino	
100m breaststroke	1:16.31		Martina Savaglia	San Marino	2 June 2005	Games of the Small States of Europe	Andorra la Vella, Andorra	
200m breaststroke	2:45.12		Martina Savaglia	San Marino	4 July 2005	European Youth Olympic Festival	Lignano Sabbiadoro, Italy	
50m butterfly	28.23		Beatrice Felici	Gens Acquatica	28 April 2018	Meeting Squalo Blu	Serravalle, San Marino	
100m butterfly	1:02.87		Beatrice Felici	Gens Acquatica	2 August 2017	Italian Summer Championships	Rome, Italy	
200m butterfly	2:17.51		Simona Muccioli	-	20 May 2010	Coppa Latina	Mar del Plata, Argentina	
200m individual medley	2:25.57		Simona Muccioli	-	25 April 2009	-	Ravenna, Italy	
400m individual medley	5:09.45		Simona Muccioli	San Marino	5 June 2009	Games of the Small States of Europe	Limassol, Cyprus	
4×100m freestyle relay	3:55.72		Sara Lettoli (58.14); Carlotta Bulzoni (59.80); Elisa Bernardi (58.90); Beatrice Felici (58.88)	San Marino	2 June 2017	Games of the Small States of Europe	Serravalle, San Marino	
4×200m freestyle relay	8:28.40	h	Sara Lettoli (2:06.26); Elena Giovannini (2:06.93); Arianna Valloni (2:07.12); Elisa Bernardi (2:08.09)	San Marino	31 May 2017	Games of the Small States of Europe	Serravalle, San Marino	
4×100m medley relay	4.30.91		Carlotta Bulzoni (1:08.03); Linda Canti (1:19.38); Beatrice Felici (1:04.37); Sara Lettoli (59.13)	San Marino	25 February 2017	Meeting del Titano	Serravalle, San Marino	

Legend: # – Record awaiting ratification by FSN; WR – World record; ER – European record;
Records not set in finals: h – heat; sf – semifinal; r – relay 1st leg; rh – relay heat 1st leg; b – B final; † – en route to final mark; so – swim-off; tt – time trial

=== Mixed relay ===
Event	Time		Name	Club	Date	Meet	Location	Ref
4×100 m freestyle relay	3:47.48	h	Davide Bernardi (53.39); Christian Santi (54.95); Elisa Bernardi (59.81); Martina Cecciaroni (59.33)	San Marino	20 May 2016	European Championships	London, Great Britain	
4×200 m freestyle relay	8:21.31	h	Cristian Santi (1:58.98); Gianluca Pasolini (2:01.25); Elisa Bernardi (2:10.29); Arianna Valloni (2:10.79)	San Marino	4 August 2018	European Championships	Glasgow, Great Britain	
4×100 m medley relay	4:02.86	'#'	Matteo Oppioli (58.57); Elisa Celli (1:10.36); Alessandro Rebosio (55.77); Ilaria Ceccaroni (58.16)	San Marino	30 May 2025	Games of the Small States of Europe	Andorra la Vella, Andorra	

Legend: # – Record awaiting ratification by FSN; WR – World record; ER – European record;
Records not set in finals: h – heat; so – swim-off

== Short Course (25 m) ==
=== Men ===
Event	Time		Name	Club	Date	Meet	Location	Ref
50m freestyle	23.60		Stefano Berti	-	23 December 2018	Coppa Caduti di Brema	Riccione, Italy	
100m freestyle	51.50		Loris Bianchi	-	24 March 2024	Regional Championships	Carpi, Italy	
200m freestyle	1:48.91	h	Loris Bianchi	San Marino	8 December 2023	European Championships	Otopeni, Romania	
400m freestyle	3:48.52	h	Loris Bianchi	San Marino	5 December 2023	European Championships	Otopeni, Romania	
800m freestyle	7:54.35	h	Loris Bianchi	San Marino	9 December 2023	European Championships	Otopeni, Romania	
1500m freestyle	15:24.62		Loris Bianchi	Gens Aquatica San Marino	22 October 2023	Trofeo Nuoto	Riccione, Italy	
50m backstroke	26.98		Davide Bernardi	-	23 March 2015	-	Riccione, Italy	
100m backstroke	58.41		Davide Bernardi	-	2 November 2014	Trofeo Nico Sapio	Genoa, Italy	
200m backstroke	2:07.95		Alberto Tasini	-	28 February 2010	-	Forlì, Italy	
50m breaststroke	28.27 (Note: by official result source; 28.25 by FSN source, probably a typo)	h, †	Giacomo Casadei	San Marino	2 December 2025	European Championships	Lublin, Poland	
100m breaststroke	59.65	h	Giacomo Casadei	San Marino	2 December 2025	European Championships	Lublin, Poland	
200m breaststroke	2:11.91	h	Giacomo Casadei	San Marino	13 December 2024	World Championships	Budapest, Hungary	
50m butterfly	25.64		Alessandro Rebosio	Gens Aquatica San Marino	21 December 2021	Qualifiche regionali	Riccione, Italy	
100m butterfly	55.37		Alessandro Rebosio	Gens Aquatica San Marino	29 March 2022	Italian Junior Championships	Riccione, Italy	
200m butterfly	2:02.70		Alessandro Rebosio	Gens Aquatica San Marino	28 March 2022	Italian Junior Championships	Riccione, Italy	
100m individual medley	1:00.27		Alberto Guidi	Gens Acquatica	9 February 2020	Qual. Regionali Forlì	Riccione, Italy	
200m individual medley	2:08.39		Giacomo Casadei	Gens Aquatica San Marino	22 December 2022	Coppa Brema	Riccione, Italy	
400m individual medley	4:37.6		Diego Mularoni	-	14 April 2002	-	Bologna, Italy	
4×50m freestyle relay								
4×100m freestyle relay	3:36.08		Raffaele Tamagnini; Loris Bianchi; Andrea Gatti; Giacomo Casadei	Gens Acquatica	23 Fedruary 2019	Regional Championships	Forlì, Italy	
4×200m freestyle relay								
4×50m medley relay								
4×100m medley relay	3:56.30		Matteo Prosperi; Giacomo Casadei; Alessandro Rebosio; Loris Bianchi	Gens Aquatica San Marino	22 December 2022	Coppa Brema	Riccione, Italy	

Legend: # – Record awaiting ratification by FSN; WR – World record; ER – European record;
Records not set in finals: h – heat; sf – semifinal; r – relay 1st leg; rh – relay heat 1st leg; b – B final; † – en route to final mark; so – swim-off; tt – time trial

=== Women ===
Event	Time		Name	Club	Date	Meet	Location	Ref
50 m freestyle	26.14		Clelia Tini	-	22 December 2010	Italian Championships	Riccione, Italy	
100m freestyle	57.09		Ilaria Ceccaroni	-	16 March 2025	Finali regionali CRCVC	Riccione, Italy	
100m freestyle	56.58	#	Ilaria Ceccaroni	San Marino	29 March 2026	Italian Junior Championships	Riccione, Italy	
200m freestyle	2:02.44	h	Sara Lettoli	San Marino	16 December 2017	European Championships	Copenhagen, Denmark	
400m freestyle	4:14.53		Arianna Valloni	Pol Comunale Riccione	20 December 2020	Coppa Caduti di Brema	Riccione, Italy	
800m freestyle	8:40.45		Arianna Valloni	Pol Comunale Riccione	20 December 2020	Coppa Caduti di Brema	Riccione, Italy	
1500m freestyle	16:27.62		Arianna Valloni	Pol Comunale Riccione	13 February 2021	Italian Regional Meet	Riccione, Italy	
50m backstroke	29.98		Beatrice Felici	-	21 January 2017	-	Forlì, Italy	
100m backstroke	1:04.72		Carlotta Bulzoni	-	24 January 2016	-	Riccione, Italy	
200m backstroke	2:25.69		Carlotta Modula	-	22 December 2024	Coppa Brema	Riccione, Italy	
50m breaststroke	35.22		Linda Canti	-	20 March 2016	Trofeo Città di Milano	Milan, Italy	
100m breaststroke	1:15.56		Linda Canti	-	28 February 2016	-	Forlì, Italy	
200m breaststroke	2:41.75		Linda Canti	-	20 December 2015	Coppa Caduti di Brema	Riccione, Italy	
50m butterfly	28.24		Beatrice Felici	Gens Acquatica	15 December 2018	Qual. Regionali Forlì	Riccione, Italy	
100m butterfly	1:02.41		Beatrice Felici	Gens Acquatica	4 March 2018	Campionati Regionali Vasca Corta	Forlì, Italy	
200m butterfly	2:17.51		Simona Muccioli	-	20 May 2010	Coppa Latina	Mar Del Plata, Argentina	
100m individual medley	1:09.93		Simona Muccioli	-	7 November 2009	-	Bolzano, Italy	
200m individual medley	2:23.75		Beatrice Felici	Gens Acquatica	28 January 2018	Campionato Regionale vasca corta conc.C Seconda prova	Riccione, Italy	
400m individual medley	5:02.70		Simona Muccioli	-	14 March 2009	-	Forlì, Italy	
4×50m freestyle relay	1:51.02	h	Beatrice Felici (27.12); Elena Giovannini (27.51); Elisa Bernardi (28.10); Chiara Gualtieri (28.29)	San Marino	7 December 2014	World Championships	Doha, Qatar	
4×100m freestyle relay								
4×200m freestyle relay	9:18.60		Michela Broccoli; Linda Leardini; Monica Toccaceli; Simona Muccioli	San Marino	10 April 1999	-	Bologna, Italy	
4×50m medley relay								
4×100m medley relay	4:23.58		Carlotta Bulzoni (1:05.54); Linda Canti (1:15.77); Beatrice Felici (1:04.65); Sara Lettoli (57.62)	Gens Acquatica	18 December 2016	Coppa Caduti di Brema	Riccione, Italy	

Legend: # – Record awaiting ratification by FSN; WR – World record; ER – European record;
Records not set in finals: h – heat; sf – semifinal; r – relay 1st leg; rh – relay heat 1st leg; b – B final; † – en route to final mark; so – swim-off; tt – time trial

=== Mixed relay ===
Event	Time		Name	Club	Date	Meet	Location	Ref
4×50m freestyle relay	1:44.65	h	Gianluca Pasolini (25.08); Cristian Santi (24.43); Beatrice Felici (28.11); Elena Giovannini (27.03)	San Marino	6 December 2014	World Championships	Doha, Qatar	
4×50m medley relay								

Legend: # – Record awaiting ratification by FSN; WR – World record; ER – European record;
Records not set in finals: h – heat; so – swim-off
