= Luxembourg at the 2019 World Aquatics Championships =

- Flag of Luxembourg
- FINA code: LUX
- National federation: Luxembourg Swimming and Rescue Federation
- Website: flns.lu (in French)

World Aquatics Championships appearances
- 1973; 1975; 1978; 1982; 1986; 1991; 1994; 1998; 2001; 2003; 2005; 2007; 2009; 2011; 2013; 2015; 2017; 2019; 2022; 2023; 2024

Luxembourg competed at the 2019 World Aquatics Championships in Gwangju, South Korea from 12 to 28 July.

== High diving ==
Luxembourg qualified one male high diver.

Athlete	Event	Points	Rank
Alain Kohl	Men's high diving	236.30	13

== Swimming ==
Luxembourg entered five swimmers.

Men

Athlete	Event	Heat		Semifinal		Final	
Athlete	Event	Time	Rank	Time	Rank	Time	Rank
Pit Brandenburger	200 m freestyle	1:50.10	38	did not advance			
Pit Brandenburger	800 m freestyle	8:23.99	35	—		did not advance	
Julien Henx	50 m freestyle	22.71	42	did not advance			
Julien Henx	100 m freestyle	50.43	52	did not advance			
Julien Henx	50 m butterfly	23.91	=28	did not advance			
Raphaël Stacchiotti	200 m individual medley	1:59.62	14 Q	2:00.26	16	did not advance	
Raphaël Stacchiotti	400 m individual medley	4:27.80	28	—		did not advance	

Women

Athlete	Event	Heat		Semifinal		Final	
Athlete	Event	Time	Rank	Time	Rank	Time	Rank
Julie Meynen	50 m freestyle	25.07	16 Q	24.78	12	did not advance	
Julie Meynen	100 m freestyle	54.44	17	did not advance			
Monique Olivier	200 m freestyle	2:01.96	28	did not advance			
Monique Olivier	400 m freestyle	4:14.29	22	—		did not advance	

Mixed

Athlete	Event	Heat		Final	
Athlete	Event	Time	Rank	Time	Rank
Julien Henx; Raphaël Stacchiotti; Julie Meynen; Monique Olivier	4×100 m freestyle relay	3:33.55	18	did not advance	
