= Luxembourg at the 2023 World Aquatics Championships =

- Flag of Luxembourg
- FINA code: LUX
- National federation: Luxembourg Swimming and Rescue Federation
- Website: flns.lu (in French)

in Fukuoka, Japan
- Competitors: 4 in 1 sport
- Medals: Gold 0 Silver 0 Bronze 0 Total 0

World Aquatics Championships appearances
- 1973; 1975; 1978; 1982; 1986; 1991; 1994; 1998; 2001; 2003; 2005; 2007; 2009; 2011; 2013; 2015; 2017; 2019; 2022; 2023; 2024

Luxembourg competed at the 2023 World Aquatics Championships in Fukuoka, Japan, from 14 to 30 July.

== Swimming ==
Luxembourg entered four swimmers.

Men

Athlete	Event	Heat		Semifinal		Final	
Athlete	Event	Time	Rank	Time	Rank	Time	Rank
Pit Brandenburger	200 metre freestyle	1:51.27	39	Did not advance			
Ralph Daleiden	100 metre freestyle	48.77 NR	26	Did not advance			
Remi Fabiani	50 metre freestyle	22.47 NR	37	Did not advance			
Remi Fabiani	50 metre backstroke	25.87	33	Did not advance			
Julien Henx	50 metre butterfly	23.65	27	Did not advance			
