= Trišić =

Trišić is a surname. Notable people with the surname include:

- Ana Trišić-Babić (born 1967), Bosnian politician
- Anja Trišić (born 1987), Croatian swimmer
- Ivana Trišić (fl. from 2017), Serbian beauty pageant titleholder
