= Árni Árnason =

Árni Árnason may refer to:

- Árni Már Árnason (born 1987), Icelandic Olympic swimmer
- Árni Páll Árnason (born 1966), Icelandic politician, former Minister for Social Affairs
- Árni Árnason (musician), musician and member of The Vaccines
