= Luxembourg at the 2024 World Aquatics Championships =

- Flag of Luxembourg
- FINA code: LUX
- National federation: Luxembourg Swimming and Rescue Federation
- Website: flns.lu (in French)

in Doha, Qatar
- Competitors: 3 in 1 sport
- Medals: Gold 0 Silver 0 Bronze 0 Total 0

World Aquatics Championships appearances
- 1973; 1975; 1978; 1982; 1986; 1991; 1994; 1998; 2001; 2003; 2005; 2007; 2009; 2011; 2013; 2015; 2017; 2019; 2022; 2023; 2024

Luxembourg competed at the 2024 World Aquatics Championships in Doha, Qatar from 2 to 18 February.

== Competitors ==
The following is the list of competitors in the Championships.

Sport	Men	Women	Total
Swimming	3	0	3
Total	3	0	3

== Swimming ==
Luxembourg entered 3 swimmers.

Men

Athlete	Event	Heat		Semifinal		Final	
Athlete	Event	Time	Rank	Time	Rank	Time	Rank
Remi Fabiani	50 metre freestyle	22.55	35	Did not advance			
Remi Fabiani	100 metre backstroke	56.21	32	Did not advance			
Julien Henx	50 metre butterfly	23.77	25	Did not advance			
Max Mannes	200 metre freestyle	1:52.76	43	Did not advance			
