= Luxembourg at the 2022 World Aquatics Championships =

- Flag of Luxembourg
- FINA code: LUX
- National federation: Luxembourg Swimming and Rescue Federation
- Website: flns.lu (in French)

in Budapest, Hungary
- Competitors: 4 in 1 sport
- Medals: Gold 0 Silver 0 Bronze 0 Total 0

World Aquatics Championships appearances
- 1973; 1975; 1978; 1982; 1986; 1991; 1994; 1998; 2001; 2003; 2005; 2007; 2009; 2011; 2013; 2015; 2017; 2019; 2022; 2023; 2024

Luxembourg competed at the 2022 World Aquatics Championships in Budapest, Hungary from 17 June to 3 July.

== Swimming ==
Luxembourg entered four swimmers.

Men

Athlete	Event	Heat		Semifinal		Final	
Athlete	Event	Time	Rank	Time	Rank	Time	Rank
Ralph Daleiden	100 m freestyle	50.01	=41	did not advance			
Rémi Fabiani	50 m freestyle	22.80	47	did not advance			
Julien Henx	50 m butterfly	23.69	=26	did not advance			
Max Mannes	200 m freestyle	1:51.06	40	did not advance			
Max Mannes	50 m backstroke	26.19	32	did not advance			
Max Mannes	100 m backstroke	56.90	33	did not advance			
