= Swimming at the 2008 Summer Olympics – Women's 200 metre freestyle =

Women's 200 metre freestyle at the Games of the XXIX Olympiad
- Venue: Beijing National Aquatics Center
- Date: August 11, 2008 (heats); August 12, 2008(semifinals); August 13, 2008 (final)
- Competitors: 46 from 37 nations
- Winning time: 1:54.82 WR

Medalists
1st place, gold medalist(s)		Federica Pellegrini	Italy
2nd place, silver medalist(s)		Sara Isakovič	Slovenia
3rd place, bronze medalist(s)		Pang Jiaying	China

The women's 200 metre freestyle event at the 2008 Olympic Games took place on 11–13 August at the Beijing National Aquatics Center in Beijing, China.

Italy's Federica Pellegrini broke a new world record of 1:54.82 to claim a gold medal in the event. Sara Isakovič, who finished behind Pellegrini by 0.15 of a second, cleared a 1:55 barrier to set a new Slovenian record of 1:54.97, and ultimately become the nation's first ever medalist in swimming. China's Pang Jiaying edged out U.S. swimmer Katie Hoff on the final lap to pick up a bronze in 1:55.05. Hoff finished in fourth place in an American record of 1:55.78.

Defending champion Camelia Potec finished outside the medals in fifth place, posting a Romanian record of 1:56.87. Great Britain's Caitlin McClatchey earned a sixth spot in 1:57.65, and was followed by a seventh-place tie between Australia's Bronte Barratt and France's Ophélie-Cyrielle Étienne in a matching time of 1:57.83. For the first time in Olympic history, all eight swimmers went faster than a winning time of 1:58.03, previously set by Potec in Athens four years earlier.

Earlier in the prelims, Pang broke one of the oldest Olympic records in the book, when she clocked at 1:57.37 to lead the fourth heat, slashing 0.28 seconds off the old mark set by East Germany's Heike Friedrich from Seoul in 1988. Two heats later, Pellegrini posted a top-seeded time of 1:55.45 to erase Laure Manaudou's world record, set in 2007.

== Records ==
Prior to this competition, the existing world and Olympic records were as follows.

World record	Laure Manaudou (FRA)	1:55.52	Melbourne, Australia	28 March 2007	
Olympic record	Heike Friedrich (GDR)	1:57.65	Seoul, South Korea	21 September 1988	-

The following new world and Olympic records were set during this competition.

Date	Event	Name	Nationality	Time	Record
August 11	Heat 4	Pang Jiaying	China	1:57.37	OR
August 11	Heat 5	Sara Isakovič	Slovenia	1:55.86	OR
August 11	Heat 6	Federica Pellegrini	Italy	1:55.45	WR
August 13	Final	Federica Pellegrini	Italy	1:54.82	WR

== Results ==
=== Heats ===
Rank	Heat	Lane	Name	Nationality	Time	Notes
1	6	5	Federica Pellegrini	Italy	1:55.45	Q, WR
2	5	4	Sara Isakovič	Slovenia	1:55.86	Q, NR
3	5	3	Caitlin McClatchey	Great Britain	1:56.97	Q, NR
4	6	4	Katie Hoff	United States	1:57.20	Q
5	6	2	Ágnes Mutina	Hungary	1:57.25	Q, NR
6	4	2	Pang Jiaying	China	1:57.37	Q, AS
7	4	4	Allison Schmitt	United States	1:57.38	Q
8	6	1	Haruka Ueda	Japan	1:57.64	Q, NR
9	4	3	Camelia Potec	Romania	1:57.65	Q, NR
10	5	5	Bronte Barratt	Australia	1:57.75	Q
11	5	2	Ophélie-Cyrielle Étienne	France	1:57.93	Q
12	6	3	Linda Mackenzie	Australia	1:57.96	Q
13	5	6	Josefin Lillhage	Sweden	1:57.98	Q
14	4	5	Joanne Jackson	Great Britain	1:58.00	Q
15	6	6	Aurore Mongel	France	1:58.11	Q
16	5	1	Ida Marko-Varga	Sweden	1:58.21	Q
17	4	7	Stephanie Horner	Canada	1:58.35	
18	4	1	Melania Costa	Spain	1:59.50	
19	6	7	Zhu Qianwei	China	1:59.52	
20	6	8	Daria Belyakina	Russia	1:59.72	
21	4	8	Maki Mita	Japan	1:59.96	
22	4	6	Annika Lurz	Germany	1:59.98	
23	3	5	Ranomi Kromowidjojo	Netherlands	2:00.02	
24	5	7	Petra Dallmann	Germany	2:00.21	
25	5	8	Geneviève Saumur	Canada	2:00.49	
26	3	7	Jördis Steinegger	Austria	2:00.52	NR
27	3	1	Anna Stylianou	Cyprus	2:00.55	
28	3	6	Monique Ferreira	Brazil	2:00.64	
28	2	4	Elina Partõka	Estonia	2:00.64	NR
30	2	5	Nina Rangelova	Bulgaria	2:00.66	
31	2	7	Hoi Shun Stephanie Au	Hong Kong	2:00.85	
32	3	3	Paulina Barzycka	Poland	2:00.92	
33	3	4	Melissa Corfe	South Africa	2:00.95	
34	2	2	Louise Mai Jansen	Denmark	2:01.30	
35	1	4	Nataliya Khudyakova	Ukraine	2:02.27	
36	2	6	Lynette Lim	Singapore	2:02.30	
37	3	8	Yang Chin-kuei	Chinese Taipei	2:02.84	
38	1	5	Natthanan Junkrajang	Thailand	2:02.88	
39	2	8	Christine Mailliet	Luxembourg	2:02.91	
40	1	2	Milica Ostojić	Serbia	2:03.19	
41	1	7	Heysi Villarreal	Cuba	2:03.23	
42	1	3	Anja Trišić	Croatia	2:03.57	
43	2	3	Melanie Nocher	Ireland	2:04.29	
44	3	2	Eleni Kosti	Greece	2:04.55	
45	1	6	Sigrún Brá Sverrisdóttir	Iceland	2:04.82	
46	2	1	Lee Keo-ra	South Korea	2:05.71	

=== Semifinals ===
==== Semifinal 1 ====
Rank	Lane	Name	Nationality	Time	Notes
1	4	Sara Isakovič	Slovenia	1:56.50	Q
2	5	Katie Hoff	United States	1:57.01	Q
3	3	Pang Jiaying	China	1:57.34	Q
4	2	Bronte Barratt	Australia	1:57.55	Q
5	7	Linda Mackenzie	Australia	1:58.19	
6	6	Haruka Ueda	Japan	1:58.44	
7	1	Joanne Jackson	Great Britain	1:58.70	
8	8	Ida Marko-Varga	Sweden	1:59.41	

==== Semifinal 2 ====
Rank	Lane	Name	Nationality	Time	Notes
1	4	Federica Pellegrini	Italy	1:57.23	Q
2	2	Camelia Potec	Romania	1:57.71	Q
3	5	Caitlin McClatchey	Great Britain	1:57.73	Q
4	7	Ophélie-Cyrielle Étienne	France	1:58.00	Q
5	6	Allison Schmitt	United States	1:58.01	
6	8	Aurore Mongel	France	1:58.08	
7	3	Ágnes Mutina	Hungary	1:58.15	
8	1	Josefin Lillhage	Sweden	1:59.29	

=== Final ===
Rank	Lane	Name	Nationality	Time	Notes
1st place, gold medalist(s)	3	Federica Pellegrini	Italy	1:54.82	WR
2nd place, silver medalist(s)	4	Sara Isakovič	Slovenia	1:54.97	NR
3rd place, bronze medalist(s)	6	Pang Jiaying	China	1:55.05	AS
4	5	Katie Hoff	United States	1:55.78	AM
5	7	Camelia Potec	Romania	1:56.87	NR
6	1	Caitlin McClatchey	Great Britain	1:57.65	
7	2	Bronte Barratt	Australia	1:57.83	
7	8	Ophélie-Cyrielle Étienne	France	1:57.83	
