= Swimming at the 2013 Games of the Small States of Europe =

Swimming at the 2013 Games of the Small States of Europe was held from 28–31 May 2013 at d'Coque, Luxembourg.

== Medal summary ==
=== Medal table ===
* Host nation (Luxembourg)

| Rank | Nation | Gold | Silver | Bronze | Total |
|---|---|---|---|---|---|
| 1 | Iceland | 16 | 15 | 8 | 39 |
| 2 | Luxembourg* | 9 | 7 | 6 | 22 |
| 3 | Liechtenstein | 5 | 6 | 6 | 17 |
| 4 | Cyprus | 2 | 2 | 10 | 14 |
| 5 | Malta | 0 | 2 | 1 | 3 |
| 6 | Monaco | 0 | 0 | 1 | 1 |
| Totals (6 entries) | | 32 | 32 | 32 | 96 |

=== Men ===
| Event | Gold | | Silver | | Bronze | |
|---|---|---|---|---|---|---|
| 50 m freestyle | Alexandre Bakhtiarov (CYP) | 23.45 | Andrew Chetcuti (MLT) | 23.50 | Omiros Zagkas (CYP) | 23.54 |
| 100 m freestyle | Jean-François Schneiders (LUX) | 50.88 | Omiros Zagkas (CYP) | 51.37 | Andrew Chetcuti (MLT) | 51.61 |
| 200 m freestyle | Jean-François Schneiders (LUX) | 1:53.06 | Anton Sveinn McKee (ISL) | 1:54.27 | Iacovos Hadjiconstantinou (CYP) | 1:55.50 |
| 400 m freestyle | Anton Sveinn McKee (ISL) | 3:59.25 | Pit Brandenburger (LUX) | 4:03.41 | Iacovos Hadjiconstantinou (CYP) | 4:05.58 |
| 1500 m freestyle | Anton Sveinn McKee (ISL) | 16:11.97 | Christoph Meier (LIE) | 16:17.76 | Amor Stefánsson (ISL) | 16:22.90 |
| 100 m backstroke | Jean-François Schneiders (LUX) | 56.33 | Davíð Hildiberg Aðalsteinsson (ISL) | 57.91 | Sebastian Konnaris (CYP) | 58.86 |
| 200 m backstroke | Jean-François Schneiders (LUX) | 2:01.71 | Kristinn Þórarinsson (ISL) | 2:09.34 | Kolbeinn Hfrafnkelsson (ISL) | 2:10.64 |
| 100 m breaststroke | Anton Sveinn McKee (ISL) | 1:03.17 | Hrafn Traustason (ISL) | 1:05.21 | Francois-Xavier Paquot (MON) | 1:05.35 |
| 200 m breaststroke | Anton Sveinn McKee (ISL) | 2:16.97 | Hrafn Traustason (ISL) | 2:19.56 | Christoph Meier (LIE) | 2:21.06 |
| 100 m butterfly | Alexandre Bakhtiarov (CYP) | 55.12 | Andrew Chetcuti (MLT) | 55.58 | Daníel Hannes Pálsson (ISL) | 57.14 |
| 200 m butterfly | Christoph Meier (LIE) | 2:05.44 | Daníel Hannes Pálsson (ISL) | 2:06.61 | Louis Gloesener (LUX) | 2:09.10 |
| 200 m individual medley | Anton Sveinn McKee (ISL) | 2:05.94 | Christoph Meier (LIE) | 2:06.46 | Thomas Tsiopanis (CYP) | 2:09.32 |
| 400 m individual medley | Anton Sveinn McKee (ISL) | 4:27.29 | Christoph Meier (LIE) | 4:27.97 | Laurent Carnol (LUX) | 4:34.01 |
| 4×100 m freestyle relay | Luxembourg; Pit Brandenburger; Julien Henx; Jean-François Schneiders; Raphaël Stacchiotti | 3:24.75 | Cyprus; Alexandre Bakhtiarov; Thomas Tsiopanis; Sebastian Konnaris; Omiros Zagkas | 3:28.81 | Iceland; Davíð Hildiberg Aðalsteinsson; Anton Sveinn McKee; Alexander Johannesson; Aron Örn Stefánsson | 3:29.00 |
| 4×200 m freestyle relay | Luxembourg; Pit Brandenburger; Julien Henx; Jean-François Schneiders; Raphaël Stacchiotti | 7:34.08 | Iceland; Davíð Hildiberg Aðalsteinsson; Anton Sveinn McKee; Daníel Hannes Pálsson; Aron Örn Stefánsson | 7:39.15 | Cyprus; Alexandre Bakhtiarov; Iacovos Hadjiconstantinou; Sebastian Konnaris; Omiros Zagkas | 8:00.53 |
| 4×100 m medley relay | Luxembourg; Pit Brandenburger; Julien Henx; Jean-François Schneiders; Raphaël Stacchiotti | 3:47.61 | Iceland; Davíð Hildiberg Aðalsteinsson; Anton Sveinn McKee; Daníel Hannes Pálsson; Aron Örn Stefánsson | 3:47.72 | Cyprus; Alexandre Bakhtiarov; Sebastian Konnaris; Lefkios Xanthhou; Omiros Zagkas | 3:54.76 |

=== Women ===
| Event | Gold | | Silver | | Bronze | |
|---|---|---|---|---|---|---|
| 50 m freestyle | Julie Meynen (LUX) | 25.59 | Ingibjörg Kristín Jónsdóttir (ISL) | 26.08 | Karen Sif Vilhjálmsdóttir (ISL) | 26.39 |
| 100 m freestyle | Julie Meynen (LUX) | 56.19 | Ingibjörg Kristín Jónsdóttir (ISL) | 57.39 | Julia Hassler (LIE) | 57.77 |
| 200 m freestyle | Eygló Ósk Gústafsdóttir (ISL) | 2:02.44 | Julia Hassler (LIE) | 2:02.57 | Julie Meynen (LUX) | 2:03.16 |
| 400 m freestyle | Julia Hassler (LIE) | 4:17.71 | Monique Olivier (LUX) | 4:20.44 | Inga Elin Cryer (ISL) | 4:24.73 |
| 800 m freestyle | Julia Hassler (LIE) | 8:45.09 | Monique Olivier (LUX) | 8:59.50 | Inga Elin Cryer (ISL) | 9:09.35 |
| 100 m backstroke | Eygló Ósk Gústafsdóttir (ISL) | 1:02.89 | Ingibjörg Kristín Jónsdóttir (ISL) | 1:04.47 | Sarah Rolko (LUX) | 1:05.51 |
| 200 m backstroke | Eygló Ósk Gústafsdóttir (ISL) | 2:15.21 | Jóhanna Gústafsdóttir (ISL) | 2:18.04 | Sarah Rolko (LUX) | 2:19.11 |
| 100 m breaststroke | Hrafnhildur Lúthersdóttir (ISL) | 1:11.11 | Theresa Banzer (LIE) | 1:13.40 | Irene Chrysostomou (CYP) | 1:13.42 |
| 200 m breaststroke | Hrafnhildur Lúthersdóttir (ISL) | 2:31.28 | Theresa Banzer (LIE) | 2:34.91 | Irene Chrysostomou (CYP) | 2:38.88 |
| 100 m butterfly | Julia Hassler (LIE) | 1:02.28 | Julie Meynen (LUX) | 1:02.51 | Johanna Gerda Gústafsdóttir (ISL) | 1:02.92 |
| 200 m butterfly | Julia Hassler (LIE) | 2:15.96 | Inga Elín Cryer (ISL) | 2:21.45 | Jasmin Büchel (LIE) | 2:29.76 |
| 200 m individual medley | Hrafnhildur Lúthersdóttir (ISL) | 2:17.27 | Eygló Ósk Gústafsdóttir (ISL) | 2:20.99 | Monique Olivier (LUX) | 2:23.47 |
| 400 m individual medley | Johanna Gerda Gústafsdóttir (ISL) | 4:54.57 | Eygló Ósk Gústafsdóttir (ISL) | 4:55.17 | Julia Hassler (LIE) | 5:02.55 |
| 4×100 m freestyle relay | Iceland; Eygló Ósk Gústafsdóttir; Ingibjörg Kristín Jónsdóttir; Hrafnhildur Lúthersdóttir; Karen Sif Vilhjálmsdóttir | 3:49.75 | Luxembourg; Jacqueline Banky; Julie Meynen; Monique Olivier; Sarah Rolko | 3:52.69 | Liechtenstein; Theresa Banzer; Jasmin Büchel; Julia Hassler; Tamara Vetsch | 4:00.69 |
| 4×200 m freestyle relay | Iceland; Inga Elin Cryer; Eygló Ósk Gústafsdóttir; Johanna Gerda Gústafsdóttir; Hrafnhildur Lúthersdóttir | 8:25.24 | Luxembourg; Jacqueline Banky; Julie Meynen; Monique Olivier; Christina Roch | 8:28.24 | Liechtenstein; Theresa Banzer; Jasmin Büchel; Julia Hassler; Celina Kind | 8:43.34 |
| 4×100 m medley relay | Iceland; Eygló Ósk Gústafsdóttir; Johanna Gerda Gústafsdóttir; Ingibjörg Kristín Jónsdóttir; Hrafnhildur Lúthersdóttir | 4:12.96 | Luxembourg; Jil Einhorn; Julie Meynen; Christina Roch; Sarah Rolko | 4:23.22 | Cyprus; Irene Chrysostomou; Sofina Neofytou; Chrysoula Karamanou; Sofia Papadopoulou | 4:23.78 |
