= Árnason Global 3 =

Icelandic experimental aeroplane

Global 3

General information
- Type: Experimental aircraft
- National origin: Iceland
- Manufacturer: Verkfraedistofa Kristj Arnarsonar
- Designer: Kristján Árnason
- Status: On display
- Number built: 1

History
- First flight: 6 June 2008
- Retired: 2011

The Árnason Global 3 was a 2000s Icelandic twin pusher aeroplane intended to make an aerial circumnavigation.

== Design and development ==
Kristján Árnason was an aircraft engineer, who had previously designed and built the JFP-2S-8 canard. He wished to make fly around the world but could not find a suitable twin-engined aircraft that met his criteria. That led to his designing the Global 3. The model name references it being a 3-place aircraft intended to make a global circumnavigation. The registration of TP-VKA refers to Verkfraedistofa Kristj Arnarsonar - the company that Árnason created in order to construct the aircraft.

The aeroplane was a low-wing monoplane of all-metal construction. It had a fully faired fuselage, with the pilot and passengers positioned well ahead of the wing in order to give unobstructed visibility. It had a fixed tricycle undercarriage. Power was supplied by two Jabiru 2200 engines, positioned above the wing, which drove two pusher propellers. The aircraft's systems were designed to deal with possible engine failure. The propellers were fitted with folding blades, and would feather in the event of engine failure. Each engine had independent electrical and fuel systems, arranged so that they be applied to the other engine if necessary. Two fuel tanks were built into the wings, with it being possible to transfer fuel between tanks.

== Operational history ==
Construction commenced in 2004, with the first flight taking place on 6 June 2008. Testing determined that the aircraft did not met the flight specifications that Árnason had hoped for. After Árnason's death, his widow donated the Global 3 to the Icelandic Aviation Museum, where it is currently on display.

== Specifications ==
Data from Piloot en Vliegtuig

General characteristics

- Capacity: 3
- Max takeoff weight: 803 kg (1,770 lb)
- Powerplant: 2 × Jabiru 2200
- Propellers: 2-bladed , folding

Performance

- Maximum speed: 288 km/h (179 mph, 156 kn)
- Cruise speed: 207 km/h (129 mph, 112 kn)
- Range: 1,400 km (870 mi, 760 nmi) including 45 minutes reserve
- Service ceiling: 4,500 m (14,800 ft)
- Rate of climb: 5.5 m/s (1,080 ft/min)

Avionics
Garmin 430 WAAS, EFIS Dynon D-100 and engine instruments on two Dynon D-10s

== See also ==
Aircraft of comparable role, configuration, and era

- Margański & Mysłowski EM-11 Orka
- Softeks V-24 Lastivka
- Softex-Aero V-24
- Velocity V-Twin
