= Daniela Schreiber =

German swimmer

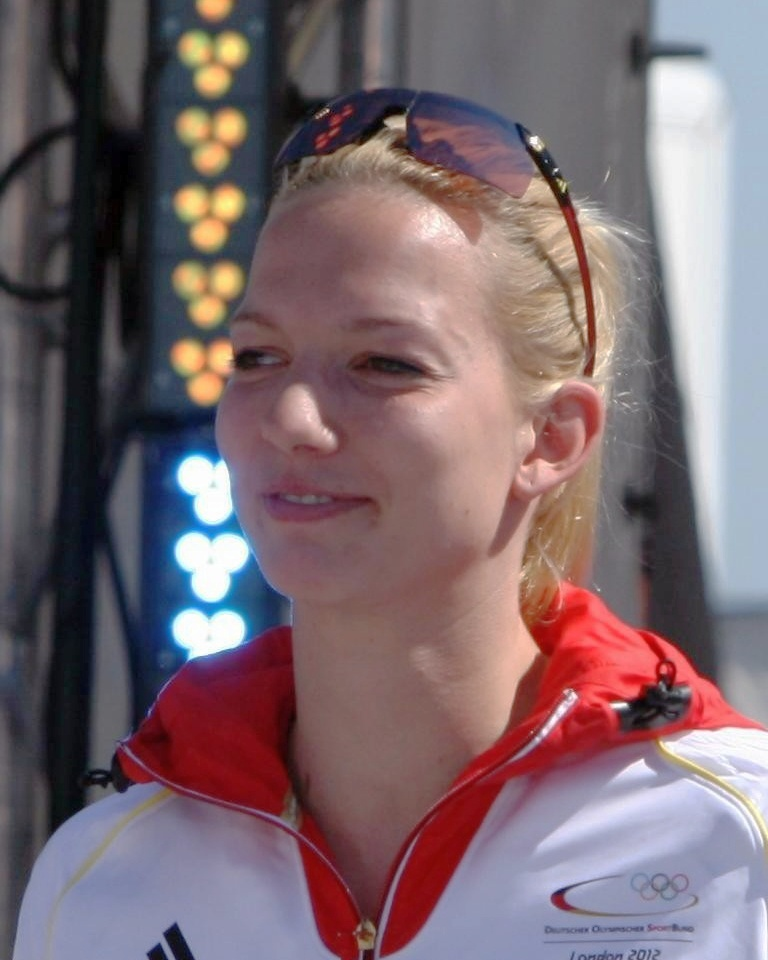
- Schreiber in 2012

Personal information
- Nationality: Germany
- Born: 26 June 1989 (age 37) Dessau, East Germany
- Height: 1.84 m (6 ft 0 in)
- Weight: 67 kg (148 lb)
- Website: DanielaSchreiber.de

Sport
- Sport: Swimming
- Strokes: Freestyle
- Club: SV Halle
Medal record
World Championships (LC)
Silver medal – second place	2009 Rome	4×100 m freestyle
Bronze medal – third place	2009 Rome	4×100 m medley
Bronze medal – third place	2011 Shanghai	4×100 m freestyle
European Championships (LC)
Gold medal – first place	2010 Budapest	4×100 m freestyle
Gold medal – first place	2012 Debrecen	4×100 m freestyle
Bronze medal – third place	2012 Debrecen	100 m freestyle
European Championships (SC)
Gold medal – first place	2011 Szczecin	4×50 m freestyle
Silver medal – second place	2010 Eindhoven	4×50 m freestyle
Bronze medal – third place	2008 Rijeka	4×50 m freestyle
Bronze medal – third place	2009 Istanbul	4×50 m freestyle
Youth World Championships
Gold medal – first place	2006 Rio de Janeiro	50 m freestyle
Gold medal – first place	2006 Rio de Janeiro	100 m freestyle
Silver medal – second place	2006 Rio de Janeiro	4×100 m freestyle
Bronze medal – third place	2006 Rio de Janeiro	4×200 m freestyle

Daniela Schreiber (born 26 June 1989) is a German swimmer. She competed at the 2012 Summer Olympics in the 100 m, 4 × 100 m, and 4 × 200 m freestyle events, and finished in 15th, 9th, and 11th place, respectively.

Between 2009 and 2012, she won three gold, two silver and five bronze medals at European and world championships, mostly in the 4×50 m and 4 × 100 m freestyle relays.
