= Jón Árnason =

Jón Árnason may refer to:

- Jón Árnason (bishop of Garðar) (died 1209)
- Jón Árnason (author) (1819–1888), Icelandic author
- Jón Loftur Árnason (born 1960), Icelandic chess player
- Jón Gunnar Árnason (1931–1989), Icelandic sculptor
