= Milica Ostojić =

Serbian swimmer

Personal information
- Born: October 16, 1991 (age 34) Belgrade, SR Serbia, SFR Yugoslavia

Sport
- Sport: Swimming

Milica Ostojić (Serbian Cyrillic: Милица Остојић, born 16 October 1991) is a Serbian Olympic swimmer.

She represented Serbia at the 2008 Summer Olympics in Beijing, People's Republic of China. At only 16 years of age, she was the youngest member of the Serbian Olympic team. She participated in the women's 200 metre freestyle, in which she took 40th place overall among 46 competitors with a time of 2.03.19.

== See also ==
- List of Serbian records in swimming
