= Sigrún Brá Sverrisdóttir =

Icelandic swimmer

Personal information
- Full name: Sigrún Brá Sverrisdóttir
- National team: Iceland
- Born: 23 March 1990 (age 36) Reykjavík, Iceland
- Height: 1.67 m (5 ft 6 in)
- Weight: 60 kg (132 lb)

Sport
- Sport: Swimming
- Strokes: Freestyle
- College team: University of Arkansas (U.S.)

Sigrún Brá Sverrisdóttir (born March 23, 1990, in Reykjavík) is an Icelandic swimmer, who specialized in freestyle events. She represented her nation Iceland at the 2008 Summer Olympics, and has held multiple Icelandic championship titles and national records in the women's freestyle (100, 200, and 400 m). Sverrisdottir is also a member of the swimming team for the Arkansas Razorbacks, while pursuing her studies at the University of Arkansas in Fayetteville.

Sverrisdottir competed for Iceland in the women's 200 m freestyle at the 2008 Summer Olympics in Beijing. Leading up to the Games, she scored a time of 2:03.35 to beat the insurmountable FINA B-cut (2:03.50) by 0.15 of a second at the Mare Nostrum Monte Carlo Swim Meet in Monaco. Swimming on the outside lane in heat one, Sverrisdottir touched with a 2:04.82 to round out a six-strong field to last place, but was unable to hold off the fast-charging Croatian swimmer Anja Trišić, who finished ahead of her by more than a second on a late surge, at the final turn. Sverrisdottir failed to advance to the semifinals, as she placed forty-fifth overall in the prelims.
