= Anja Trišić =

Croatian swimmer (born 1987)

Personal information
- Full name: Anja Trišić
- National team: Croatia
- Born: 28 April 1987 (age 39) Pula, Socialist Republic of Croatia, Socialist Federative Republic of Yugoslavia
- Height: 1.71 m (5 ft 7 in)
- Weight: 60 kg (132 lb)

Sport
- Sport: Swimming
- Strokes: Freestyle
- Club: Zagrebački plivački klub
- Coach: Pero Kuterovac

Anja Trišić (born April 28, 1987) is a Croatian swimmer, who specialized in freestyle events. Representing her nation Croatia at the 2008 Summer Olympics, Trisic has been a member of the swimming team throughout her career for Zagrebacki plivacki klub, under the tutelage of her personal coach Pero Kuterovac.

Trisic competed for the Croatian swimming team in the women's 200 m freestyle at the 2008 Summer Olympics in Beijing. Leading up to the Games, she posted a time of 2:03.01 to eclipse the FINA B-cut (2:03.50) at the Croatian Open Championships in Dubrovnik. Coming from fourth at the final turn in heat one, Trisic tried to hold on with 16-year-old Milica Ostojić of Serbia throughout the race for the fourth spot, but could not catch her on the late surge to finish only with the fifth-place time in 2:03.57. Trisic failed to advance into the semifinals, as she placed forty-second overall in the prelims.
