= Árnason JFP-2S-8 =

Icelandic experimental aeroplane

JFP-2S-8
- The Árnason_JFP-2S-8 as displayed at the Icelandic Aviation Museum

General information
- Type: Experimental aircraft
- National origin: Iceland
- Manufacturer: Kristján Árnason
- Number built: 1

History
- Introduction date: 1996

The Árnason JFP-2S-8 was a 1990s Icelandic experimental aircraft that utilised jet flap technology. It did not fly.

== Design and development ==
Kristján Árnason was an aircraft engineer who designed and built the JFP-2S-8 to incorporate a 'jet flap propulsion' system he had devised and for which he had been granted a WIPO patent.

The aeroplane was a high-wing monoplane, of canard configuration. Two intakes, positioned midway along the fuselage, fed air to two high-pressure turbines, powered by a pair of 52 hp (39 kW) two-stroke engines. The compressed air was then expelled out over full-span flaps that formed the trailing edges of both the forewing and the main wing. The aeroplane featured a fully faired fuselage, an enclosed cockpit, a central tailfin, and a fixed tricycle undercarriage.

Design commenced in 1975, construction started circa 1987 and was completed in 1996. Both the aircraft's model name and its registration of TP-JFP reference its 'jet flap propulsion' system. According to Árnason, the JFP-2S-8 was the only aeroplane of its kind in the world.

== Operational history ==
From WO patent 1997012804 - "Aircraft with jet flap propulsion"

In 1996, the aeroplane was displayed in a semi-completed state at the Reykjavík–Keflavík Airport. During subsequent runway tests, it reached a speed of 40 kn (74 km/h), but could not take off.

The aeroplane is currently on display at the Icelandic Aviation Museum. It had been delivered to the museum in 2013 using the Icelandic patrol boat ICGV Þór.

== See also ==
Aircraft of comparable role, configuration, and era

- Ball-Bartoe Jetwing
- Hunting H.126
- Windstar YF-80
