= Erla Dögg Haraldsdóttir =

Icelandic swimmer

Personal information
- Full name: Erla Dögg Haraldsdóttir
- National team: Iceland
- Born: 19 April 1988 (age 38) Njarðvík, Iceland
- Height: 1.80 m (5 ft 11 in)
- Weight: 68 kg (150 lb)

Sport
- Sport: Swimming
- Strokes: Breaststroke, medley
- College team: Old Dominion University (U.S.)

Erla Dögg Haraldsdóttir (born 19 April 1988) is an Icelandic swimmer, who specialized in breaststroke and individual medley events. She represented her nation Iceland at the 2008 Summer Olympics, and has claimed a total of twenty-four Icelandic championship titles and eleven national records in both the 50 and 100 m breaststroke.

Haraldsdottir competed for Iceland in two swimming events at the 2008 Summer Olympics in Beijing. Leading up to the Games, she posted a time of 1:10.66 (100 m breaststroke) to eclipse the FINA B-cut at the Mare Nostrum Arena International Meet in Canet-en-Roussillon, France, and 2:18.74 (200 m individual medley) at the Icelandic Championships in Reykjavík. In the 100 m breaststroke, Haraldsdottir touched with a 1:11.78 for the sixth spot and fortieth overall in heat three, just a shy of her entry time by 1.12 seconds. The following day, Haraldsdottir raced her way to fourth place in heat one of the 200 m individual medley with a 2:20.53, but failed to advance to the semifinals, finishing thirty-fifth overall in the prelims.

Haraldsdottir is a member of the swimming team, along with her compatriot Árni Már Árnason, for the Old Dominion Monarchs, and a graduate of civil engineering at the Old Dominion University in Norfolk, Virginia. Haraldsdottir also became the first female swimmer to represent her university at the 2011 NCAA Swimming & Diving Championships, where she set her own personal record of 1:01.15 in the women's breaststroke.
