= Christine Mailliet =

Luxembourgish swimmer

Personal information
- Full name: Christine Mailliet
- National team: Luxembourg
- Born: 9 January 1987 (age 39) Luxembourg City, Luxembourg
- Height: 1.69 m (5 ft 7 in)
- Weight: 55 kg (121 lb)

Sport
- Sport: Swimming
- Strokes: Freestyle, butterfly
- Club: SC Le Dauphin

Christine Mailliet (born 9 January 1987) is a Luxembourgish swimmer, who specialized in sprint freestyle and butterfly events. She is a multiple-time Luxembourgish record holder in both long and short course freestyle (200 and 400 m) and butterfly (50, 100, and 200 m).

Mailliet competed as a lone female swimmer for Luxembourg in the 200 m freestyle at the 2008 Summer Olympics in Beijing. Leading up to the Games, she smashed a Luxembourgish record in 2:02.71 to clear the FINA B-cut (2:03.50) by nearly a second at the Open Luxembourg Nationals in Luxembourg City. Swimming on the outside in heat two, Mailliet raced her way to sixth place with a steady 2:02.91, just two tenths of a second (0.2) shy off her entry time. Mailliet failed to advance to the semifinals, as she placed thirty-ninth overall in the prelims.
