= Árni Már Árnason =

Icelandic swimmer

Árni Árnason
Personal information
- Full name: Árni Már Árnason
- Nationality: Iceland
- Born: October 9, 1987 (age 38) Mosfellsbær, Iceland
- Height: 1.94 m (6 ft 4 in)

Sport
- Sport: Swimming
- Strokes: freestyle
- Club: Íþróttamaður Reykjanesbæjar (ÍRB)
- College team: Old Dominion (US: 2008-2012)

Árni Már Árnason (born 9 October 1987, in Mosfellsbær, Iceland) is an Olympic and national record holding freestyle swimmer from Iceland. He swam for Iceland at the 2008 Olympics.

He has swum for Iceland at:

- Olympics: 2008, 2012
- Games of the Small States of Europe: 2009 and 2011
- European Junior Championships.

At the 2008 Olympics, he set the Icelandic Record in the 50 free at 22.81.

From 2008 to 2012, he has attended college and swam collegiately for the US's Old Dominion University.
