= Anton McKee =

Icelandic swimmer

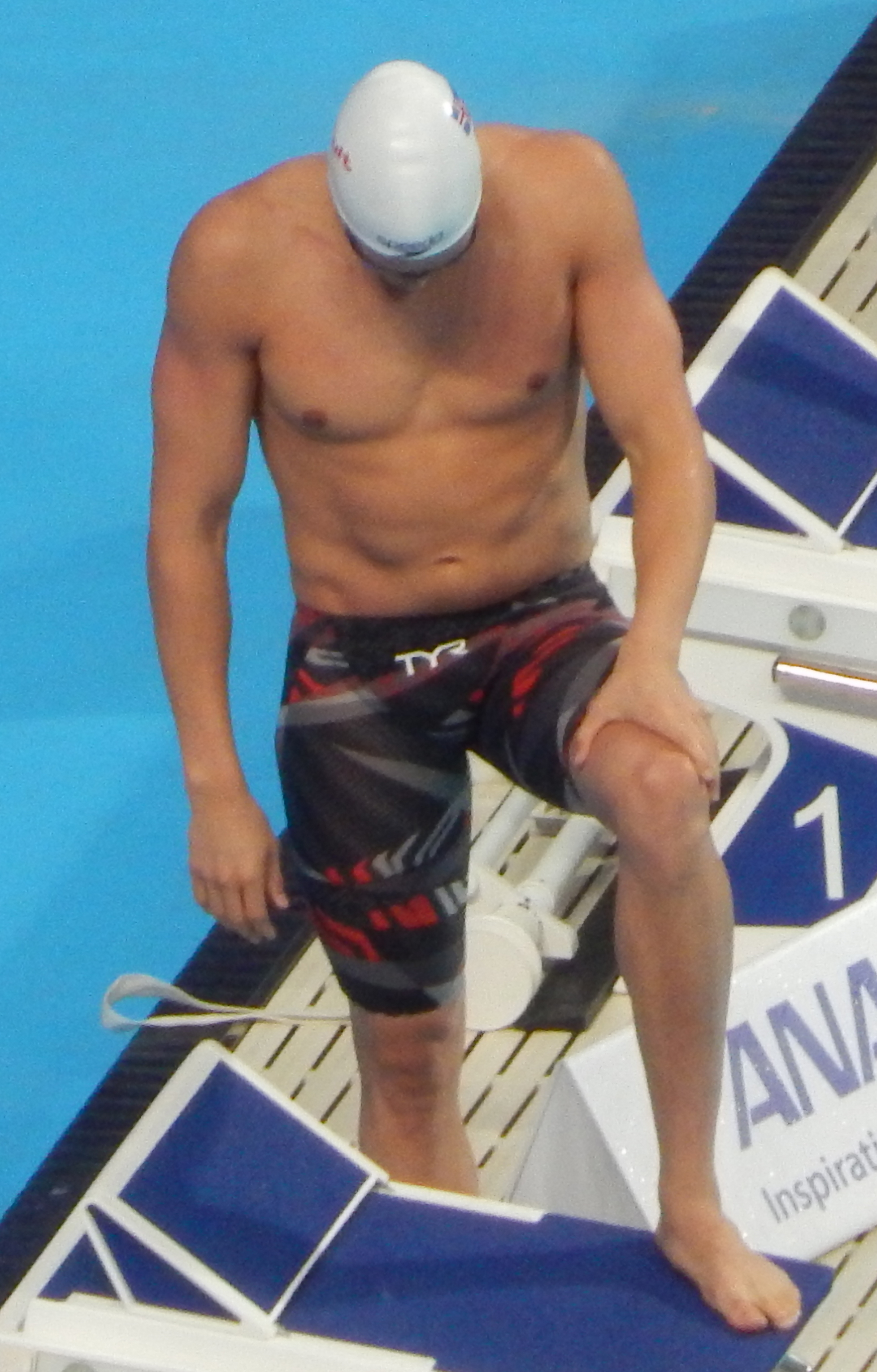
- Kazan 2015

Personal information
- Full name: Anton Sveinn McKee
- Born: 18 December 1993 (age 32) Reykjavík, Iceland
- Height: 1.83 m (6 ft 0 in)
- Weight: 84 kg (185 lb)

Sport
- University team: University of Alabama Crimson Tide
- Club: Toronto Titans (ISL 2020)
Medal record
Men's swimming
European Short Course Swimming Championships
Silver medal – second place	2023 Romania	200 m breaststroke
Representing Iceland
Games of the Small States of Europe
Gold medal – first place	2013 Luxembourg	400 m freestyle
Gold medal – first place	2013 Luxembourg	1500 m freestyle
Gold medal – first place	2013 Luxembourg	100 m breaststroke
Gold medal – first place	2013 Luxembourg	200 m breaststroke
Gold medal – first place	2013 Luxembourg	200 m medley
Gold medal – first place	2013 Luxembourg	400 m medley
Silver medal – second place	2013 Luxembourg	200 m freestyle
Silver medal – second place	2013 Luxembourg	4x200 m freestyle
Silver medal – second place	2013 Luxembourg	4×100 m medley
Silver medal – second place	2015 Iceland	200 m breaststroke
Silver medal – second place	2015 Iceland	200 m medley
Silver medal – second place	2015 Iceland	4x200 m freestyle
Bronze medal – third place	2013 Luxembourg	4x100 m freestyle

Anton Sveinn McKee (born 18 December 1993 in Reykjavík) is a retired Icelandic swimmer who competes in the Men's 400m individual medley.

== Career ==
=== International Swimming League ===
In spring of 2020, Anton signed for the Toronto Titans, the first Canadian based team in the ISL.

=== Olympic Games ===
At the 2012 Summer Olympics, he finished 31st overall in the heats of the Men's 400 metre individual medley and failed to reach the final.

At the 2016 Summer Olympics, he finished 18th overall in the heats of the Men's 200 metre breaststroke and failed to reach the final.

At the 2020 Summer Olympics, he finished 24th overall in the heats of the Men's 200 metre breaststroke and failed to reach the final.

At the 2024 Summer Olympics, he finished 9th overall in the heats of the Men's 200 metre breaststroke, qualifying for the semi-finals. He finished 8th in the second semi-final, and failed to reach the final.

=== Other ===
At the 2015 Games of the Small States of Europe in Iceland, Anton won three silver medals, for 200 m breaststroke, 200 m medley and as part of the 4 × 200 m freestyle team. At the 2013 Games of the Small States of Europe in Luxemburg, Anton won six gold medals for 400 m freestyle, 1500 m freestyle, 100 m breaststroke, 200 m breaststroke, 200 m medley and the 400 m medley. He also won three silver medals in 200 m freestyle and as part if the 4 × 200 m and 4 × 100 m freestyle teams. He also took home a bronze medal from these games as part of the 4 × 100 m freestyle team.

McKee retired from competitive swimming in 2024.

Olympic Games
Preceded by Þormóður Árni Jónsson	Flagbearer for Iceland (with Snæfríður Jórunnardóttir); Tokyo 2020	Succeeded by Hákon Svavarsson
