= Simona Muccioli =

Sammarinese swimmer

Personal information
- Born: 15 March 1984 (age 42)

Sport
- Sport: Swimming
- Strokes: Butterfly

Simona Muccioli (born 15 March 1984) is an Olympic swimmer from San Marino. She has swum for San Marino at the Olympics (2008), World Championships (2003, 2005, 2007, 2009, 2011) and Mediterranean Games (2005), and other international meets.

As of August 2013, she holds the long course San Marino Records in 10 events (400, 800, 1500 and 5,000 frees; 50, 100, 200 flies; and 200 and 400 IM).

At the 2008 Olympics, she swam in the first heat of the Women's 100 Butterfly, finishing in 1:04.91 for last place overall.
