= Anna Stylianou =

Cypriot swimmer (born 1986)

Personal information
- Nationality: Cyprus
- Born: 20 May 1986 (age 40) Larnaca, Cyprus
- Height: 1.70 m (5 ft 7 in)
- Weight: 55 kg (121 lb)

Sport
- Sport: Swimming
- Strokes: Freestyle
- Club: Olympiacos (GRE)

Anna Stylianou (Greek: Άννα Στυλιανού; born May 20, 1986) is a Cypriot swimmer, who specialized in freestyle events. Stylianou made her official debut, as a 14-year-old, at the 2000 Summer Olympics in Sydney, where she placed forty-fourth overall in the women's 100 m freestyle, with a time of 59.08 seconds.

Eight years after competing in her last Olympics, Stylianou qualified for her second Cypriot team, as a 22-year-old, at the 2008 Summer Olympics in Beijing. In the 200 m freestyle, Stylianou challenged seven other swimmers on the third heat, including freestyle relay champion Ranomi Kromowidjojo of the Netherlands. She snared the third spot and twenty-seventh overall by three hundredths of a second (0.03) Austria's Jördis Steinegger in 2:00.55. In her second event, 100 m freestyle, Stylianou finished sixth on the same heat and thirty-sixth overall by 0.03 of a second behind Iceland's Ragnheiður Ragnarsdóttir, lowering her Olympic time to 56.38.

At the 2012 Summer Olympics in London, Stylianou qualified only for the 200 m freestyle in a B-standard entry time of 2:00.88. She challenged seven other swimmers on the second heat, including four-time Olympian Hanna-Maria Seppälä of Finland and former Olympic champion Camelia Potec of Romania. Stylianou raced to fourth place by more than half a second (0.50) behind Mexico's Liliana Ibanez, outside her entry time of 2:01.87. Stylianou failed to advance into the semifinals, as she matched her overall position from Beijing in the preliminary heats.
