= Clelia Tini =

Sammarinese swimmer

Personal information
- Born: 2 January 1992 (age 34) Borgo Maggiore, San Marino
- Height: 1.65 m (5 ft 5 in)
- Weight: 57 kg (126 lb)

Sport
- Sport: Swimming
- Strokes: Freestyle

Clelia Tini (born 2 January 1992) is a Sammarinese swimmer who competed in the 2012 Summer Olympics. She did not advance to the semifinals.
