= Sarah Bateman =

American-born competition swimmer

Personal information
- Full name: Sarah Blake Bateman
- National team: Iceland
- Born: June 15, 1990 (age 36) Orlando, Florida, U.S.
- Height: 5 ft 7 in (1.70 m)
- Weight: 128 lb (58 kg)

Sport
- Sport: Swimming
- Strokes: Backstroke, breaststroke, butterfly, freestyle, individual medley
- Club: Ægir (Iceland); Patriot Aquatics (USA)
- College team: University of Florida

Sarah Blake Bateman (born June 15, 1990) is an American-born competitive swimmer who has represented Iceland in international events. She was born and raised in the United States, but has dual citizenship from her Icelandic maternal grandmother Johanna Hjaltalin.

At the 2008 Summer Olympics, she competed in the 100 m backstroke, but did not advance beyond the first round.

At the 2012 Summer Olympics, she finished 32nd overall in the preliminary heats in the 100-meter butterfly, and did not advance. In the 50-meter freestyle heats, she tied for 16th with two other swimmers and took part in a qualification swim-off, but did not advance. She was part of the Icelandic 4 × 100 m medley team, which also did not advance beyond the first round.
