= Julie Meynen =

Luxembourgish swimmer

Personal information
- Born: 15 August 1997 (age 28) Luxembourg City, Luxembourg

Sport
- Sport: Swimming
Medal record
Women's swimming
Representing Luxembourg
Games of the Small States of Europe
Gold medal – first place	2013 Luxembourg	50 m freestyle
Gold medal – first place	2013 Luxembourg	100 m freestyle
Gold medal – first place	2015 Iceland	50 m freestyle
Gold medal – first place	2015 Iceland	100 m freestyle
Silver medal – second place	2013 Luxembourg	100 m butterfly
Silver medal – second place	2013 Luxembourg	4×100 m freestyle
Silver medal – second place	2013 Luxembourg	4×200 m freestyle
Silver medal – second place	2013 Luxembourg	4×100 m medley
Silver medal – second place	2015 Iceland	4×200 m freestyle
Bronze medal – third place	2013 Luxembourg	200 m freestyle
Bronze medal – third place	2015 Iceland	100 m backstroke
European Junior Championships
Bronze medal – third place	2013 Poznań	100 m freestyle

Julie Meynen (born 15 August 1997) is a Luxembourgish swimmer. She competed in the women's 100 metre freestyle event at the 2016 Summer Olympics.

In 2019, she represented Luxembourg at the 2019 World Aquatics Championships held in Gwangju, South Korea. She competed in the women's 50 metre freestyle and women's 100 metre freestyle events. In the 50 metres event she advanced to the semi-finals and in the 100 metres event she did not advance to compete in the semi-finals. She also competed in the 4 × 100 metre mixed freestyle relay event.
