= Ingibjörg Jónsdóttir =

Icelandic swimmer

Personal information
- Born: 24 October 1993 (age 32)

Sport
- Sport: Swimming

Ingibjörg Jónsdóttir (born 24 October 1993) is an Icelandic swimmer. She competed in the women's 50 metre backstroke event at the 2017 World Aquatics Championships. She also competed in the women's 50 metre freestyle event at the 2018 FINA World Swimming Championships (25 m), in Hangzhou, China.
