= Ragnheiður Ragnarsdóttir =

Icelandic actress and swimmer

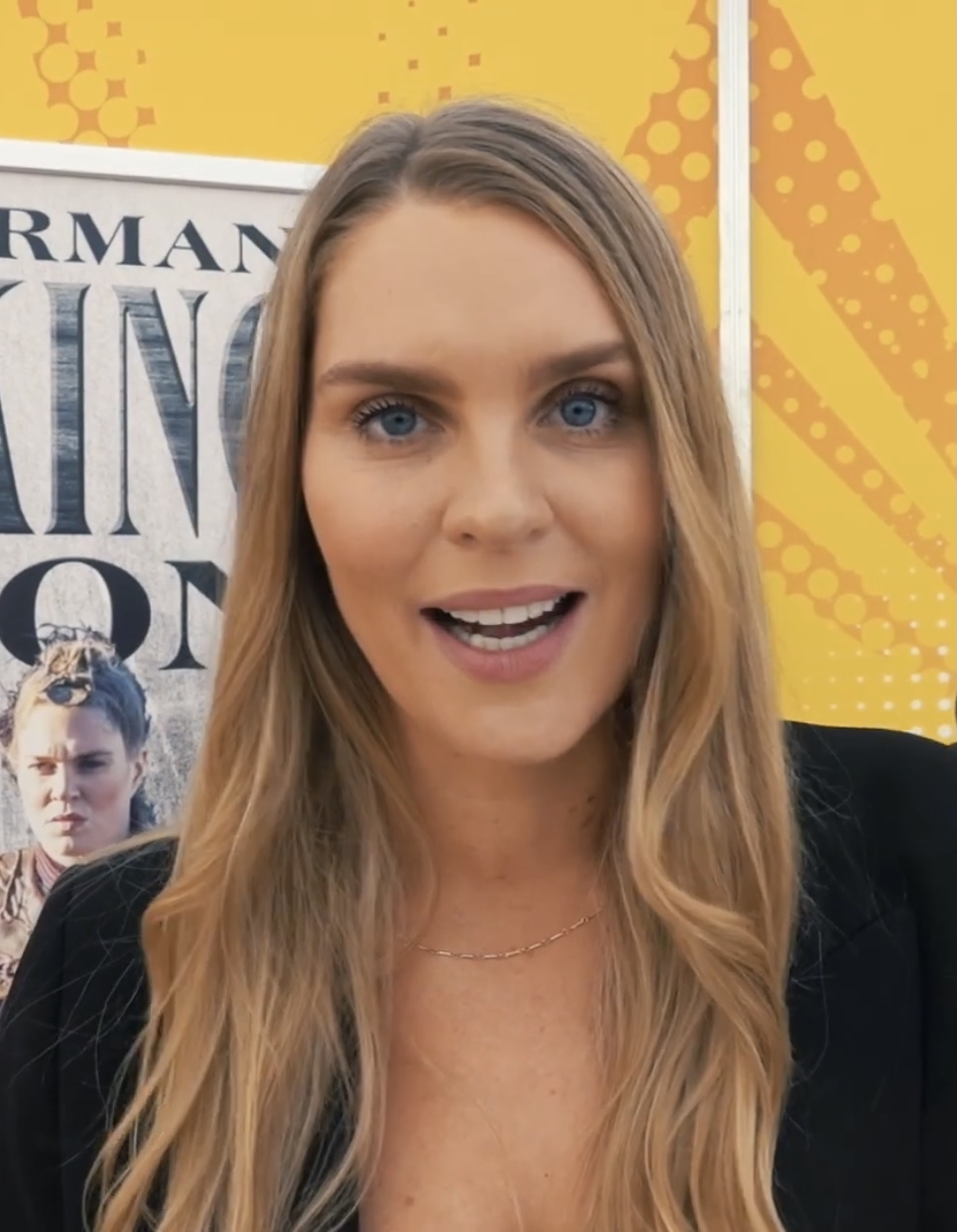
- Ragnheiður at the 2022 German Vikings Con

Personal information
- National team: Iceland
- Born: 24 October 1984 (age 41) Reykjavík, Iceland
- Height: 1.88 m (6 ft 2 in)
- Weight: 74 kg (163 lb)

Sport
- Sport: Swimming
- Strokes: Freestyle
- Club: Mission Viejo Nadadores (U.S.)

Ragnheiður Ragnarsdóttir, also known as Ragga Ragnars (born 24 October 1984) is an Icelandic actress and former swimmer, who specialised in sprint freestyle events. She is a multiple-time Icelandic record holder in both long and short course freestyle (both 50 metres and 100 metres). After retiring from swimming, Ragnheiður studied acting and played the role of Gunnhild on the TV series Vikings from 2018 to 2020.

== Career ==
=== Swimming ===
Ragnheiður made her Olympic debut at the 2004 Summer Olympics in Athens, where she was Iceland's youngest swimmer (aged 19). She qualified for two swimming events by attaining B-standard entry times of 26.34 (50 m freestyle) and 56.74 (100 m freestyle). In the 100 m freestyle, Ragnheiður finished last in heat three and 40th overall with a time of 58.47 seconds. In the 50 m freestyle, Ragnheiður missed victory in heat five by a hundredth of a second (0.01) behind Luxembourg's Lara Heinz, finishing second and thirty-first overall in 26.36 seconds.

At the 2008 Summer Olympics in Beijing, Ragnheiður again qualified in the same two swimming events. She cleared FINA B-cuts of 25.95 (50 m freestyle) from the Dutch Open Swim Cup in Eindhoven and 56.06 (100 m freestyle) from FINA World Championships in Melbourne. In the 100 m freestyle, she was reassigned in heat three against seven other swimmers, including Hong Kong's Hannah Wilson and Bahamas' Arianna Vanderpool-Wallace. She touched out Cyprus' Anna Stylianou to take the fifth spot and thirty-fifth overall by three hundredths of a second (0.03), in a time of 56.35 seconds. In the 50 m freestyle, Ragnheiður finished fourth in heat eight by 0.13 of a second behind Jamaica's Natasha Moodie, clocking at 25.82. Ragnheiður failed to advance into the semifinals, as she placed thirty-sixth out of 92 swimmers in the evening prelims.

Ragnheiður did not compete at the 2012 Summer Olympics in London as she was pregnant with her son.

=== Acting ===
Ragnheiður has said that she always had a passion for acting; and after retiring from swimming, she decided to study acting. She took an eight-week "Acting for Film" course with New York Film Academy in Los Angeles, which she "loved", and then enrolled for a one-year programme. She graduated in 2015. It was also announced in the 2020 Game Awards that she would star in an animated series based on the popular Studio Wildcard game Ark: Survival Evolved in 2022 playing the role of Queen Sigrid.

Ragnheiður had also starred as Gunnhild on the TV series Vikings.

She also played a supporting role in The Wheel of Time in its 3rd and final season.

== Personal life ==
Ragnheiður was married to Atli Bjarnason, a business administrator, from 2013 to 2017. Their son was born in 2013.
