= Flag of Luxembourg =

Grand Duchy of Luxembourg
- Rout-Wäiss-Blo ("Red-White-Blue")
- Use: National flag
- Proportion: 3∶5
- Adopted: 1848 (de facto); 1993 (de jure)
- Design: A horizontal triband of red, white and light blue
- Use: National flag
- Proportion: 1∶2
- Design: A horizontal triband of red, white and light blue, only in 1:2 ratio.
- Civil ensign of Luxembourg
- Use: Civil flag and ensign
- Proportion: 1:2 or 3:5 (civil) and 5:7 (ensign)
- Design: Ten alternating stripes of white and light blue, with a red lion taken from the coat of arms superimposed on the center.

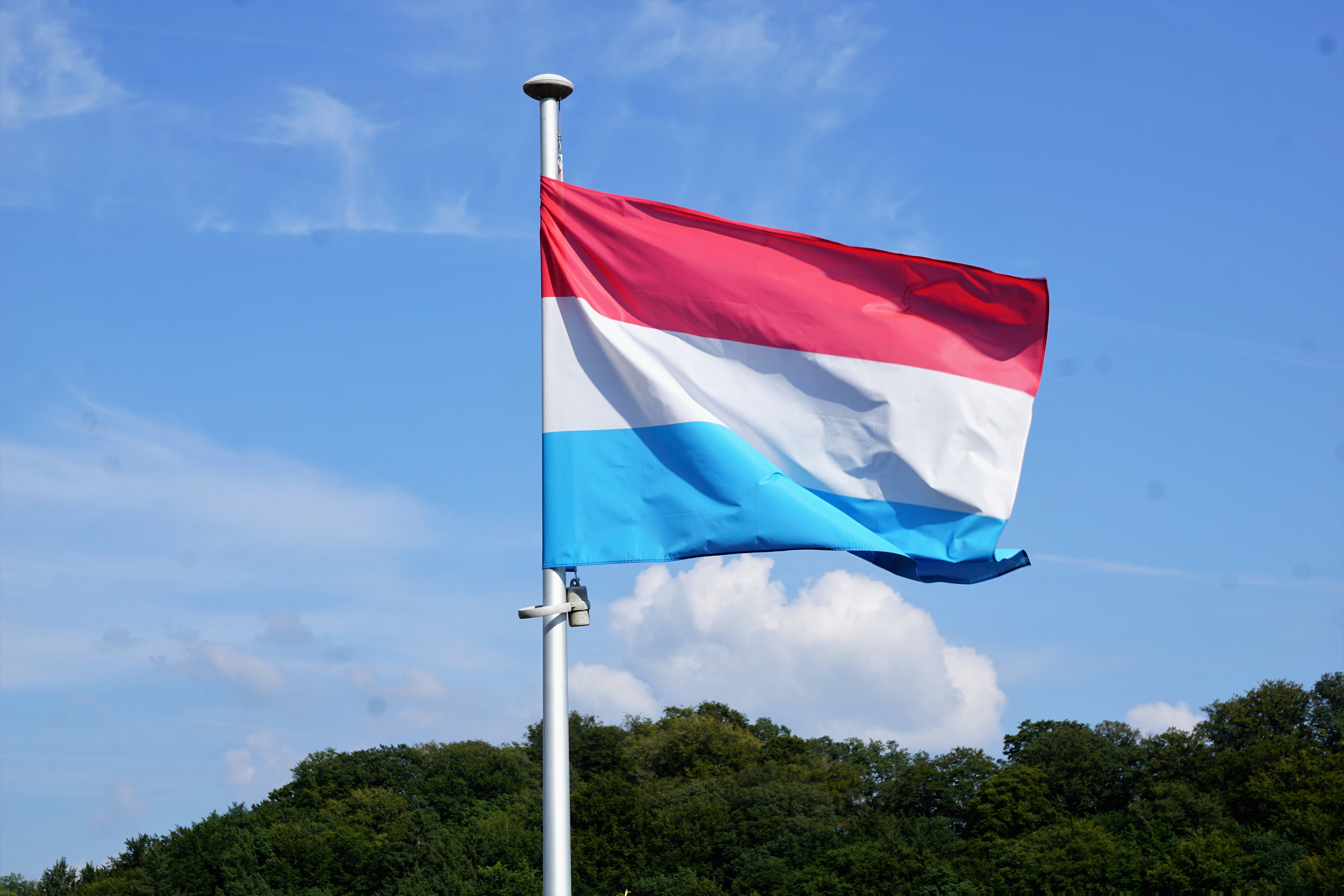
Luxembourg flag

The national flag of Luxembourg (Note: Luxembourgish: Lëtzebuerger Fändel; German: Flagge Luxemburgs; French: Drapeau du Luxembourg) is a tricolour flag, that consists of three horizontal stripes; watermelon red, white and light blue, and can be in 2:1 or 5:3 ratio. It was first used between 1845 and 1848 and officially adopted in 1993. It is informally called in the country: «Rout-Wäiss-Blo» ("Red-White-Blue").

Luxembourg had no flag until 1830, when patriots were urged to display the national colours. The flag was defined as a horizontal tricolour of red, white, and blue in 1848, but it was not officially adopted until 1993. The tricolour flag of Luxembourg is graphically almost identical to the flag of the Netherlands, except that it is longer and its light blue stripe and red stripe are a lighter shade. The red, white, and light blue colours were derived from the coat of arms of the House of Luxembourg.

== History ==
The colours of the flag of Luxembourg were first adopted around 1830 during the Belgian Revolution. They were probably derived from the coat of arms of the County and later Duchy of Luxembourg, which in turn was derived from the combination of the lion of the dukes of Limbourg and the supposed striped banner of the early counts of Luxembourg. The three-coloured horizontal design was fixed on 12 June 1845.

It took until 1993 before a law was passed regulating the flag of Luxembourg. The same law also prescribed ensign and roundel for aircraft and ships registered in Luxembourg.

One important clarification brought by this law was that the colour blue was defined as being a bright blue, in contrast to the flag of the Netherlands (exactly the same design, but the Dutch flag uses a darker shade of red and blue, and a less oblong shape).

The heraldic blazon for the flag is per fess Gules and Azure, a fess Argent.

== Ensign ==
The Red Lion (Luxembourgish: Roude Léiw) is the official ensign for ships registered in Luxembourg. It is used for river and sea shipping, as well as for aviation. This flag is based on the coat of arms of Luxembourg (a banner of arms) and is used as the ensign to avoid the possibility of Luxembourg's ensign being confused for that of the Netherlands. Ten white and blue stripes serve as the field for a red lion with a yellow tongue, claws and crown, and a doubled tail (à la queue fourchée). The proper ratio for this ensign is 5:7.

The Règlement Grand-Ducal of 27 July 1993 defined the ensign's colours as follows: (Note: Règlement grand-ducal du 27 juillet 1993 précisant la composition chromatique des couleurs du drapeau national luxembourgeois et du pavillon de la batellerie et de l’aviation)

The flag of Luxembourg displayed vertically

Scheme	Red	Celestial blue	White
Pantone	032C	299C	N/A
RGB colour model	239; 51; 64	0; 163; 224	255; 255; 255
(HEX)	#EF3340	#00A3E0	#FFFFFF
CMYK colour model	0; 90; 76; 0	79; 7; 0; 0	0; 0; 0; 0

== Roundel ==

The roundel of Luxembourg is based on the Red Lion ensign. It is seen on the AWACS aircraft used by NATO and on the Airbus A400M operated by the Luxembourg Armed Forces.

== Flag change debate ==
Flag of the Netherlands

The resemblance of the Luxembourgish flag with the Dutch flag has given rise to a national debate to change it.

On 5 October 2006, MP Michel Wolter introduced a legislative proposition to replace the current red-white-blue national flag with the Red Lion ensign. He argued that the current flag was commonly confused with that of the Netherlands and that the Red Lion on the other hand was more popular, more aesthetic and of greater historic value. Wolter also claimed he had personally discussed the matter with some three hundred people, most of whom expressed their support for his initiative. On the other hand, many national politicians (including leading members of Wolter's own CSV) and VIPs have expressed astonishment in the local media concerning both the timing and necessity for such a change. Wolter was supported in his initiative by the ADR.

On 24 October 2006, a local group called Initiativ Roude Léiw ("Red Lion Initiative") held a press conference explaining their intention to support Wolter's project on a non-partisan basis. Their first actions would include distribution of red lion bumper stickers, a petition and a poll. During sporting events like the Tour de France, supporters for Luxembourgish participants now overwhelmingly use the Red Lion instead of the national flag.

In end of July 2015, Luxembourger Marc Dax submitted a formal petition to the Chamber of Deputies to replace the current national flag with the Red Lion. It received a little less than 500 signatures.

For historical reasons, the adjacent Belgian province of Luxembourg also uses a flag featuring a lion superimposed on horizontal stripes. Elsewhere, similar designs can also be found, for instance in the Belgian city of Bruges and the German state of Hesse.

=== Two civil official flags ===
On 6 July 2007, the government stated the Roude Léiw would be accepted as a civil flag only within the territory of the Grand Duchy along with the national flag keeping the same proportions, i.e. 1:2 or 3:5 as the national flag to avoid confusion with the civil ensign.

The Luxembourg flag is prominently displayed during national celebrations, particularly on the Grand Duke’s Official Birthday, observed on 23 June. This was changed in 1962 from its former date of 23 January, the birthday of Grand Duchess Charlotte, so the festivities may be held in more favourable summer weather. On this day, flags are flown throughout the country, including at the Gëlle Fra war memorial in Luxembourg City. During periods of national mourning, the flag is flown at half-mast.

== See also ==
- List of flags of Luxembourg
