= Luxembourg at the 2011 World Aquatics Championships =

Sporting event delegation

Flag of Luxembourg

Luxembourg competed at the 2011 World Aquatics Championships in Shanghai, China between July 16 and 31, 2011.

== Swimming ==
Luxembourg qualified 3 swimmers.

Men

Athlete	Event	Heats		Semifinals		Final	
Athlete	Event	Time	Rank	Time	Rank	Time	Rank
Jean-François Schneiders	Men's 50m Backstroke	26.70	26	did not advance			
Jean-François Schneiders	Men's 100m Backstroke	57.03	42	did not advance			
Jean-François Schneiders	Men's 200m Backstroke	2:03.68	28	did not advance			
Laurent Carnol	Men's 50m Breaststroke	28.63	33	did not advance			
Laurent Carnol	Men's 100m Breaststroke	1:01.57	30	did not advance			
Laurent Carnol	Men's 200m Breaststroke	2:12.56	12 Q	2:12.23	15	did not advance	
Raphaël Stacchiotti	Men's 200m IM	2:00.87	20	did not advance			
Raphaël Stacchiotti	Men's 400m IM	4:20.64	20			did not advance	
