= Malta at the 2025 World Aquatics Championships =

- Flag of Malta
- World Aquatics code: MLT
- National federation: Aquatic Sports Association of Malta
- Website: asaofmalta.eu

in Singapore
- Competitors: 4 in 2 sports
- Medals: Gold 0 Silver 0 Bronze 0 Total 0

World Aquatics Championships appearances
- 1973; 1975; 1978; 1982; 1986; 1991; 1994; 1998; 2001; 2003; 2005; 2007; 2009; 2011; 2013; 2015; 2017; 2019; 2022; 2023; 2024; 2025

Malta competed at the 2025 World Aquatics Championships in Singapore from 11 July to 3 August 2025.

== Competitors ==
The following is the list of competitors in the Championships.

Sport	Men	Women	Total
Artistic swimming	0	3	3
Swimming	0	1	1
Total	0	4	4

== Artistic swimming ==
Women

Athlete	Event	Preliminary		Final	
Athlete	Event	Points	Rank	Points	Rank
Zea Montfort	Solo technical	206.2883	22	Did not advance	
Zea Montfort	Solo free	180.4912	20	Did not advance	
Ana Culic; Thea Grima Buttigieg	Duet technical	214.5317	30	Did not advance	
Ana Culic; Thea Grima Buttigieg	Duet free	173.0667	29	Did not advance	

== Swimming ==
Women

Athlete	Event	Heat		Semifinal		Final	
Athlete	Event	Time	Rank	Time	Rank	Time	Rank
Sasha Gatt	200 m freestyle	2:04.16	37	Did not advance			
Sasha Gatt	400 m freestyle	4:19.36	24	—		Did not advance	
