= Syria at the 2017 World Aquatics Championships =

- Flag of Syria
- World Aquatics code: SYR
- National federation: Syrian Arab Swimming and Aquatic Sports Federation

in Budapest, Hungary
- Competitors: 4 in 2 sports
- Medals: Gold 0 Silver 0 Bronze 0 Total 0

World Aquatics Championships appearances
- 1973; 1975; 1978; 1982; 1986; 1991; 1994; 1998; 2001; 2003; 2005; 2007; 2009; 2011; 2013; 2015; 2017; 2019; 2022; 2023; 2024; 2025

Syria is scheduled to compete at the 2017 World Aquatics Championships in Budapest, Hungary from 14 July to 30 July.

== Open water swimming ==
Syria has entered one open water swimmer

Athlete	Event	Time	Rank
Saleh Mohammad	Men's 25 km	5:47:08.2	24

== Swimming ==
Syrian swimmers have achieved qualifying standards in the following events (up to a maximum of 2 swimmers in each event at the A-standard entry time, and 1 at the B-standard):

Athlete	Event	Heat		Semifinal		Final	
Athlete	Event	Time	Rank	Time	Rank	Time	Rank
Azad Al-Barazi	Men's 50 m breaststroke	28.13	=36	did not advance			
Azad Al-Barazi	Men's 100 m breaststroke	1:02.26	42	did not advance			
Ayman Kelzi	Men's 100 m butterfly	56.59	60	did not advance			
Ayman Kelzi	Men's 200 m butterfly	2:01.44	34	did not advance			
Bayan Jumah	Women's 100 m freestyle	59.08	=50	did not advance			
