= 2018 FINA World Swimming Championships (25 m) – Women's 100 metre freestyle =

Women's 100 metre freestyle at the 2018 FINA World Swimming Championships (25 m)
- Venue: Hangzhou Sports Park Stadium
- Dates: 12–13 December (heats and final)
- Competitors: 97
- Winning time: 51.14

Medalists
gold medal	Ranomi Kromowidjojo	Netherlands
silver medal	Femke Heemskerk	Netherlands
bronze medal	Mallory Comerford	United States

The women's 100 metre freestyle competition of the 2018 FINA World Swimming Championships (25 m) was held on 12 and 13 December 2018.

== Records ==
Prior to the competition, the existing world and championship records were as follows.

	Name	Nation	Time	Location	Date
World record	Cate Campbell	Australia	50.25	Adelaide	26 October 2017
Championship record	Femke Heemskerk	Netherlands	51.37	Doha	5 December 2014

== Results ==
=== Heats ===
The heats were started on 12 December at 10:03.

Rank	Heat	Lane	Name	Nationality	Time	Notes
1	10	6	Mallory Comerford	United States	52.18	Q
2	9	4	Femke Heemskerk	Netherlands	52.27	Q
3	8	4	Michelle Coleman	Sweden	52.37	Q
4	10	5	Larissa Oliveira	Brazil	52.87	Q
5	10	4	Ranomi Kromowidjojo	Netherlands	52.93	Q
6	8	8	Barbora Seemanová	Czech Republic	52.94	Q
7	9	5	Lia Neal	United States	52.99	Q
8	8	3	Mariia Kameneva	Russia	53.00	Q
9	10	2	Erin Gallagher	South Africa	53.09	Q
10	8	5	Federica Pellegrini	Italy	53.17	Q
11	10	3	Zhu Menghui	China	53.20	Q
12	9	3	Anika Apostalon	Czech Republic	53.21	Q
13	8	7	Tomomi Aoki	Japan	53.54	Q
14	10	7	Annika Bruhn	Germany	53.61	Q
15	9	6	Veronika Andrusenko	Russia	53.80	Q
16	9	2	Carla Buchanan	Australia	53.82	Q
17	9	9	Isabella Arcila	Colombia	53.88	R
18	8	6	Lidón Muñoz	Spain	53.96	R
19	9	1	Lena Kreundl	Austria	54.10	
20	8	2	Wang Jingzhuo	China	54.26	
21	10	1	Manuella Lyrio	Brazil	54.38	
22	9	0	Neža Klančar	Slovenia	54.55	
23	10	8	Susann Bjørnsen	Norway	54.65	
24	8	0	Nastassia Karakouskaya	Belarus	55.01	
25	9	7	Mimosa Jallow	Finland	55.11	
26	8	1	Sze Hang Yu	Hong Kong	55.37	
27	7	5	Jasmine Alkhaldi	Philippines	55.38	NR
28	7	3	Natthanan Junkrajang	Thailand	55.44	
29	7	4	Elisbet Gámez Matos	Cuba	55.50	
30	8	9	Barbora Mikuskova	Slovakia	55.52	
31	10	0	Selen Özbilen	Turkey	55.62	
32	7	2	Karen Torrez	Bolivia	55.64	
33	10	9	Gabriela Ņikitina	Latvia	55.81	
34	9	8	Paige Flynn	New Zealand	55.85	
35	7	6	Ko Miso	South Korea	55.90	
36	7	1	Lushavel Stickland	Samoa	56.19	NR
37	2	8	Felicity Passon	Seychelles	56.47	
38	3	5	Pak Mi-song	North Korea	56.89	
39	7	7	Jessica Cattaneo	Peru	56.97	
40	7	0	Inés Remersaro	Uruguay	57.05	NR
41	6	5	Bayan Jumah	Syria	57.07	
42	6	6	Ines Marin	Chile	57.08	NR
43	6	4	Matelita Buadromo	Fiji	57.14	
44	6	2	Tonia Papapetrou	Cyprus	57.16	
45	7	9	Francesca Falzon Young	Malta	57.35	=NR
46	6	8	Elodie Poo-cheong	Mauritius	57.66	
47	6	3	Jeanne Boutbien	Senegal	57.75	NR
48	6	7	Shivani Kataria	India	57.76	
49	6	1	Elisabeth Timmer	Aruba	58.00	
50	6	0	Mónica Ramírez	Andorra	58.06	
51	5	4	Enkhkhuslen Batbayar	Mongolia	58.10	NR
52	3	2	Ariel Weech	Bahamas	58.13	
53	5	5	Ani Poghosyan	Armenia	58.14	
54	7	8	Gabriela Santis	Guatemala	58.22	NR
55	5	6	Nikol Merizaj	Albania	58.82	
56	1	7	María Hernández	Nicaragua	59.07	
57	5	7	Kaya Forson	Ghana	59.24	
58	5	3	Mariam Imnadze	Georgia	59.65	
59	6	9	Noura Mana	Morocco	59.73	
60	1	2	Savindi Jayaweera	Sri Lanka	1:00.07	
61	1	5	María Castillo	Panama	1:00.15	
62	5	2	Imara-Bella Thorpe	Kenya	1:00.21	
63	3	9	Bisma Khan	Pakistan	1:00.32	NR
64	3	4	Olivia Fuller	Antigua and Barbuda	1:00.86	NR
65	4	5	Leedia Alsafadi	Jordan	1:01.00	
66	3	6	Dirngulbai Misech	Palau	1:01.50	NR
67	5	0	Lidia Boguslawska	United States Virgin Islands	1:01.79	
68	5	1	Fjorda Shabani	Kosovo	1:02.09	NR
69	2	9	Araoluwa Oyetunji	Nigeria	1:02.34	
70	4	2	Georgia-Leigh Vele	Papua New Guinea	1:02.59	
71	3	3	Alicia Mateus	Mozambique	1:02.80	
72	4	4	Selina Katumba	Uganda	1:03.36	
73	2	6	Tisa Shakya	Nepal	1:03.81	
74	4	6	Ammara Pinto	Malawi	1:03.96	
75	5	9	Mineri Kurotori Gomez	Guam	1:04.06	
76	3	1	Danielle George	Guyana	1:04.20	
77	1	1	Charissa Panuve	Tonga	1:04.80	
77	4	3	Samantha Rakotovelo	Madagascar	1:04.80	
79	5	8	Catarina Ferreira	Cape Verde	1:05.25	
80	1	3	Anastasiya Tyurina	Tajikistan	1:05.27	
81	2	4	Anna-Sica Guerard	Togo	1:05.51	
82	4	7	Dania Nour	Palestine	1:05.72	
83	2	5	Amantle Mogara	Botswana	1:06.48	
84	2	2	Larissa Joassaint	Haiti	1:07.23	
85	2	3	Alaa Binrajab	Bahrain	1:07.85	
86	4	1	Taeyanna Adams	Federated States of Micronesia	1:08.41	
87	4	8	Senamile Dlamini	Eswatini	1:08.54	
88	3	7	Jin Ju Thompson	Northern Mariana Islands	1:09.05	
89	2	7	Alex Maclaren	Turks and Caicos Islands	1:10.46	
90	4	0	Laraïba Seibou	Benin	1:10.94	
91	4	9	Evalyn Tome	Solomon Islands	1:19.98	
92	3	0	Haneen Ibrahim	Sudan	1:20.27	
93	1	6	Odrina Kaze	Burundi	1:22.10	
94	3	8	Imelda Ximenes	Timor-Leste	1:23.07	
	1	4	Fatoumata Konate	Mali	DNS	
	2	1	Lidwine Umuhoza Uwase	Rwanda	DNS	
	2	0	Laurence Mokope	Central African Republic	DSQ	

=== Semifinals ===
The semifinals were held on 12 December at 20:07.

==== Semifinal 1 ====
Rank	Lane	Name	Nationality	Time	Notes
1	4	Femke Heemskerk	Netherlands	51.84	Q
2	3	Barbora Seemanová	Czech Republic	52.71	Q
3	6	Maria Kameneva	Russia	52.85	R
4	2	Federica Pellegrini	Italy	52.86	R
5	5	Larissa Oliveira	Brazil	52.98	
6	7	Anika Apostalon	Czech Republic	53.14	
7	8	Carla Buchanan	Australia	53.68	
8	1	Annika Bruhn	Germany	53.75	

==== Semifinal 2 ====
Rank	Lane	Name	Nationality	Time	Notes
1	3	Ranomi Kromowidjojo	Netherlands	51.95	Q
2	7	Zhu Menghui	China	52.04	Q
3	5	Michelle Coleman	Sweden	52.18	Q
4	4	Mallory Comerford	United States	52.36	Q
5	6	Lia Neal	United States	52.69	Q
6	2	Erin Gallagher	South Africa	52.70	Q, AF
7	1	Tomomi Aoki	Japan	53.27	
8	8	Veronika Andrusenko	Russia	53.35	

=== Final ===
The final took place on 13 December at 19:09.

Rank	Lane	Name	Nationality	Time	Notes
1st place, gold medalist(s)	5	Ranomi Kromowidjojo	Netherlands	51.14	CR
2nd place, silver medalist(s)	4	Femke Heemskerk	Netherlands	51.60	
3rd place, bronze medalist(s)	2	Mallory Comerford	United States	51.63	AM
4	6	Michelle Coleman	Sweden	52.24	
5	3	Zhu Menghui	China	52.40	
6	8	Barbora Seemanová	Czech Republic	52.46	NR
7	7	Lia Neal	United States	52.50	
8	1	Erin Gallagher	South Africa	53.14	
