= Syria at the 2015 World Aquatics Championships =

- Flag of Syria
- FINA code: SYR
- National federation: Syrian Arab Swimming and Aquatic Sports Federation

in Kazan, Russia
- Competitors: 4 in 2 sports
- Medals: Gold 0 Silver 0 Bronze 0 Total 0

World Aquatics Championships appearances
- 1973; 1975; 1978; 1982; 1986; 1991; 1994; 1998; 2001; 2003; 2005; 2007; 2009; 2011; 2013; 2015; 2017; 2019; 2022; 2023; 2024

Syria competed at the 2015 World Aquatics Championships in Kazan, Russia from 24 July to 9 August 2015.

== Open water swimming ==
Syria has qualified one swimmer to compete in the open water marathon.

Athlete	Event	Time	Rank
Saleh Mohammad	Men's 25 km	5:31:21.1	24

== Swimming ==
Syrian swimmers have achieved qualifying standards in the following events (up to a maximum of 2 swimmers in each event at the A-standard entry time, and 1 at the B-standard):

Men

Athlete	Event	Heat		Semifinal		Final	
Athlete	Event	Time	Rank	Time	Rank	Time	Rank
Azad Al-Barazi	100 m breaststroke	1:02.51	42	did not advance			
Azad Al-Barazi	200 m breaststroke	2:18.19	43	did not advance			
Ayman Kelzi	100 m butterfly	55.84	53	did not advance			
Ayman Kelzi	200 m butterfly	2:04.60	35	did not advance			

Women

Athlete	Event	Heat		Semifinal		Final	
Athlete	Event	Time	Rank	Time	Rank	Time	Rank
Bayan Jumah	50 m freestyle	26.81	54	did not advance			
Bayan Jumah	100 m freestyle	57.81	50	did not advance			
