= Syria at the 2019 World Aquatics Championships =

- Flag of Syria
- World Aquatics code: SYR
- National federation: Syrian Arab Swimming and Aquatic Sports Federation

in Gwangju, South Korea
- Competitors: 2 in 1 sport
- Medals: Gold 0 Silver 0 Bronze 0 Total 0

World Aquatics Championships appearances
- 1973; 1975; 1978; 1982; 1986; 1991; 1994; 1998; 2001; 2003; 2005; 2007; 2009; 2011; 2013; 2015; 2017; 2019; 2022; 2023; 2024; 2025

Syria competed at the 2019 World Aquatics Championships in Gwangju, South Korea from 12 to 28 July.

== Swimming ==
Syria entered two swimmers.

Men

Athlete	Event	Heat		Semifinal		Final	
Athlete	Event	Time	Rank	Time	Rank	Time	Rank
Omar Abbas	200 m freestyle	1:52.78	51	did not advance			
Omar Abbas	400 m freestyle	DSQ		—		did not advance	
Ayman Kelzi	100 m butterfly	55.15	50	did not advance			
Ayman Kelzi	200 m butterfly	2:00.59	31	did not advance			
