= Syria at the 2013 World Aquatics Championships =

- Flag of Syria
- FINA code: SYR
- National federation: Syrian Arab Swimming and Aquatic Sports Federation

in Barcelona, Spain
- Medals: Gold 0 Silver 0 Bronze 0 Total 0

World Aquatics Championships appearances
- 1973; 1975; 1978; 1982; 1986; 1991; 1994; 1998; 2001; 2003; 2005; 2007; 2009; 2011; 2013; 2015; 2017; 2019; 2022; 2023; 2024

Syria is competing at the 2013 World Aquatics Championships in Barcelona, Spain between 19 July and 4 August 2013.

== Open water swimming ==
Syria qualified two quota places for the following events in open water swimming.

Athlete	Event	Time	Rank
Saleh Mohammad	Men's 10 km	DNS	
Saleh Mohammad	Men's 25 km	5:04:03.6	30

== Swimming ==
Syrian swimmers achieved qualifying standards in the following events (up to a maximum of 2 swimmers in each event at the A-standard entry time, and 1 at the B-standard):

Men

Athlete	Event	Heat		Semifinal		Final	
Athlete	Event	Time	Rank	Time	Rank	Time	Rank
Ayman Klzie	100 m butterfly	56.48	46	Did not advance			
Ayman Klzie	400 m individual medley	4:41.12	39	—		Did not advance	
Welliam Maksi	200 m freestyle	1:56.02	53	Did not advance			
Welliam Maksi	400 m freestyle	4.05.01	41	—		Did not advance	

Women

Athlete	Event	Heat		Semifinal		Final	
Athlete	Event	Time	Rank	Time	Rank	Time	Rank
Bayan Jumah	50 m freestyle	26.94	47	Did not advance			
Bayan Jumah	100 m freestyle	58.13	47	Did not advance			
