= List of Syrian records in swimming =

The Syrian records in swimming are the fastest ever performances of swimmers from Syria, which are recognised and ratified by the Syrian Arab Swimming and Aquatic Sports Federation.

All records were set in finals unless noted otherwise.

== Long Course (50 m) ==
=== Men ===
Event	Time		Name	Club	Date	Meet	Location	Ref
50 m freestyle	22.41		Rafed El-Masri	SG Neukölln	2006	Asian Games	Doha, Qatar	
100 m freestyle	51.24		Rafed El-Masri	SG Neukölln	2004	Syrian Championships	Damascus, Syria	
200 m freestyle	1:51.36		Omar Abbass	Syria	10 April 2023	Thailand Age Group Championships	Samutprakan, Thailand	
400 m freestyle	3:55.86		Hisham Al-Masri	Syria	1994	Asian Games	Hiroshima, Japan	
800 m freestyle	8:14.11		Hisham Al-Masri	Syria	1994	Asian Games	Hiroshima, Japan	
1500 m freestyle	15:29.70		Hisham Al-Masri	Syria	1994	Asian Games	Hiroshima, Japan	
50 m backstroke	28.11		Souhaib Kalala	Al Muhafaza	2008	Cairo International Championships	Cairo, Egypt	
100 m backstroke	59.59		Laith Lakmoush	Syria	12 May 2023	Grand Prix	Pardubice, Czech Republic	
200 m backstroke	2:10.02		Laith Lakmoush	Syria	10 July 2023	Pan Arab Games	Oran, Algeria	
200m backstroke	2:09.89	'#'	Laith Lakmoush	Syria	29 October 2023	Arab Championships	Abu Dhabi, United Arab Emirates	
50m breaststroke	27.99		Azad Al-Barazi	Syria	17 November 2016	Asian Championships	Tokyo, Japan	
100m breaststroke	1:01.15		Azad Al-Barazi	Trojan	21 May 2016	Bermuda Championships	Hamilton, Bermuda	
200m breaststroke	2:15.43		Azad Al-Barazi	Trojan	24 April 2014	Mesa Grand Prix	Mesa, United States	
50m butterfly	25.04	h	Ayman Kelzi	Syria	18 June 2022	World Championships	Budapest, Hungary	
50m butterfly	24.99	'#'	Ayman Kelzi	Syria	28 October 2023	Arab Championships	Abu Dhabi, United Arab Emirates	
100m butterfly	54.53	h	Ayman Kelzi	Syria	1 November 2019	World Cup	Kazan, Russia	
200m butterfly	1:59.57	h	Ayman Kelzi	Syria	26 July 2021	Olympic Games	Tokyo, Japan	
200m individual medley	2:07.12		Syria	2 April 2015	12th Arab Age Group Championships	Dubai, United Arab Emirates		
200m individual medley	2:06.80	'#'	Ayman Kelzi	Syria	6 April 2019	Thailand Age Group Championships	Samut Prakan, Thailand	
400m individual medley	4:29.69		Ayman Kelzi	Syria	3 November 2019	World Cup	Kazan, Russia	
4×100m freestyle relay	3:31.21		Laith Lukmoush (53.37); Nassib Tomeh (53.10); Osama Trabulsi (53.51); Omar Abbass (51.23)	Syria	29 August 2025	Arab Championships	Casablanca, Morocco	
4×200m freestyle relay	7:51.82	h	Laith Lukmoush (1:59.75); Mouhamad Kenan Algharib (2:01.24); Osama Trabulsi (1:57.27); Omar Abbass (1:53.56)	Syria	23 July 2022	Solidarity Games	Kazan, Russia	
4×100m medley relay	3:58.67		Laith Lukmoush (1:00.95); Osama Trabulsi (1:07.41); Nader Nablsi (58.51); Omar Abbass (51.80)	Syria	31 August 2025	Arab Championships	Casablanca, Morocco	

Legend: # – Record awaiting ratification by Syrian Arab Swimming and Aquatic Sports Federation; WR – World record; AS – Asian record;
Records not set in finals: h – heat; sf – semifinal; r – relay 1st leg; rh – relay heat 1st leg; b – B final; † – en route to final mark; so – swim-off; tt – time trial

=== Women ===
Event	Time		Name	Club	Date	Meet	Location	Ref
50 m freestyle	26.13	h	Bayan Jumah	Syria	22 April 2016	Russian Championships	Moscow, Russia	
100 m freestyle	56.56		Goana Reyes	Syria	6 July 2023	Pan Arab Games	Oran, Algeria	
200 m freestyle	2:05.94	h	Bayan Jumah	Syria	24 September 2014	Asian Games	Incheon, South Korea	
400 m freestyle	4:23.46		Goana Reyes	Syria	8 July 2023	Pan Arab Games	Oran, Algeria	
800 m freestyle	9:11.20		Goana Reyes	Syria	6 July 2023	Pan Arab Games	Oran, Algeria	
1500 m freestyle	17:27.15		Inana Soleman	Syria	27 February 2024	Asian Age Group Championships	New Clark City, Philippines	
50 m backstroke	32.34		Meray Hakeeme	Syria	24 September 2004	Pan Arab Games	Algiers, Algeria	
100 m backstroke	1:10.58		Meray Hakeeme	Syria	3 May 2004	West Asia Championships	Syria	
200 m backstroke	2:34.86		Meray Hakeeme	Syria	24 September 2004	Pan Arab Games	Algiers, Algeria	
50 m breaststroke	33.95		Syria	5 July 2023	Pan Arab Games	Oran, Algeria		
50 m breaststroke	33.83	'#'	Leen Aiash	Syria	27 February 2024	Asian Age Group Championships	New Clark City, Philippines	
100 m breaststroke	1:14.04		Leen Aiash	Syria	26 February 2024	Asian Age Group Championships	New Clark City, Philippines	
200 m breaststroke	2:40.86		Leen Aiash	Syria	10 July 2023	Pan Arab Games	Oran, Algeria	
50 m butterfly	30.63	h, †	Yusra Mardini	Syria	24 July 2021	Olympic Games	Tokyo, Japan	
100 m butterfly	1:05.91	b	Yusra Mardini	Syria	9 April 2021	Eindhoven Qualification Meet	Eindhoven, Netherlands	
200 m butterfly	2:23.21	h	Inana Soleman	Syria	14 February 2024	World Championships	Doha, Qatar	
200 m individual medley	2:27.15	h	Inana Soleman	Syria	11 February 2024	World Championships	Doha, Qatar	
400 m individual medley	4:59.90		Inana Soleman	Syria	20 June 2024	BRICS Games	Kazan, Russia	
4×100 m freestyle relay								
4×200 m freestyle relay								
4×100 m medley relay								

Legend: # – Record awaiting ratification by Syrian Arab Swimming and Aquatic Sports Federation; WR – World record; AS – Asian record;
Records not set in finals: h – heat; sf – semifinal; r – relay 1st leg; rh – relay heat 1st leg; b – B final; † – en route to final mark; so – swim-off; tt – time trial

== Short Course (25 m) ==
=== Men ===
Event	Time		Name	Club	Date	Meet	Location	Ref
50 m freestyle	23.49	h	Azad Al-Barazi	Syria	30 October 2016	World Cup	Hongkong, Hong Kong	
100 m freestyle	50.01	h	Omar Abbas	Syria	14 December 2022	World Championships	Melbourne, Australia	
200 m freestyle	1:48.73	h	Omar Abbas	Syria	18 December 2022	World Championships	Melbourne, Australia	
400 m freestyle	3:53.66	h	Omar Abbas	Syria	16 December 2021	World Championships	Abu Dhabi, United Arab Emirates	
800 m freestyle	8:21.06		Omar Abbas	Syria	26 October 2021	Arab Championships	Abu Dhabi, United Arab Emirates	
1500 m freestyle								
50m backstroke	27.19	h	Ayman Kelzi	Syria	15 December 2022	World Championships	Melbourne, Australia	
100m backstroke	58.33	h	Ayman Kelzi	Syria	2 July 2013	Asian Indoor and Martial Arts Games	Incheon, South Korea	
200m backstroke								
50m breaststroke	27.23	h	Azad Al-Barazi	Syria	10 December 2016	World Championships	Windsor, Canada	
100m breaststroke	59.55	h	Azad Al-Barazi	Syria	6 December 2016	World Championships	Windsor, Canada	
200m breaststroke	2:10.21	h	Azad Al-Barazi	Syria	5 December 2014	World Championships	Doha, Qatar	
50m butterfly	24.34	h	Ayman Kelzi	Syria	13 December 2022	World Championships	Melbourne, Australia	
100m butterfly	53.70	h	Ayman Kelzi	Syria	15 November 2018	World Cup	Singapore, Singapore	
200m butterfly	1:57.50	h	Ayman Kelzi	Syria	16 November 2018	World Cup	Singapore, Singapore	
100m individual medley	56.59		Ayman Kelzi	Syria	27 October 2021	Arab Championships	Abu Dhabi, United Arab Emirates	
200m individual medley	2:03.89	h	Ayman Kelzi	Syria	14 December 2012	World Championships	Istanbul, Turkey	
400m individual medley	4:19.84	h	Ayman Kelzi	Syria	17 November 2018	World Cup	Singapore, Singapore	
4×50m freestyle relay	1:37.52	h	Laith Lukmoush (24.47); Omar Abbass (22.98); Osama Trabulsi (24.89); Mouhamad Kenan Algharib (25.18)	Syria	23 November 2022	Solidarity Games	Kazan, Russia	
4×100m freestyle relay	3:33.32	h	Laith Lukmoush (52.90); Osama Trabulsi (53.72); Nassib Tomeh (55.38); Omar Abbass (51.32)	Syria	20 November 2022	Solidarity Games	Kazan, Russia	
4×200m freestyle relay	7:43.53	h	Osama Trabulsi (1:56.29); Omar Abbass (1:51.11); Laith Lukmoush (1:56.33); Mouhamad Kenan Algharib (1:59.80)	Syria	23 November 2022	Solidarity Games	Kazan, Russia	
4×50m medley relay								
4×100m medley relay								

Legend: # – Record awaiting ratification by Syrian Arab Swimming and Aquatic Sports Federation; WR – World record; AS – Asian record;
Records not set in finals: h – heat; sf – semifinal; r – relay 1st leg; rh – relay heat 1st leg; b – B final; † – en route to final mark; so – swim-off; tt – time trial

=== Women ===
Event	Time		Name	Club	Date	Meet	Location	Ref
50 m freestyle	26.24	h	Bayan Jumah	Syria	15 December 2018	World Championships	Hangzhou, China	
100 m freestyle	56.87		Bayan Jumah	Syria	3 July 2013	Asian Indoor and Martial Arts Games	Incheon, South Korea	
200 m freestyle	2:04.73		Bayan Jumah	Syria	2 July 2013	Asian Indoor and Martial Arts Games	Incheon, South Korea	
400 m freestyle	4:25.71	†	Inana Soleman	Syria	20 October 2024	World Cup	Shanghai, China	
800 m freestyle	8:59.07		Inana Soleman	Syria	20 October 2024	World Cup	Shanghai, China	
1500 m freestyle								
50 m backstroke								
100 m backstroke								
200 m backstroke								
50 m breaststroke								
100 m breaststroke	1:16.95	h	Bayan Jumah	Syria	30 June 2013	Asian Indoor and Martial Arts Games	Incheon, South Korea	
200 m breaststroke								
50 m butterfly	30.93	h	Diana Al-Zamel	Syria	2 July 2013	Asian Indoor and Martial Arts Games	Incheon, South Korea	
100 m butterfly	1:08.71	h	Diana Al-Zamel	Syria	1 July 2013	Asian Indoor and Martial Arts Games	Incheon, South Korea	
200 m butterfly								
100 m individual medley	1:10.83	h	Diana Al-Zamel	Syria	3 July 2013	Asian Indoor and Martial Arts Games	Incheon, South Korea	
200 m individual medley	2:28.21	h	Inana Suleiman	Syria	11 December 2018	World Championships	Hangzhou, China	
400 m individual medley	5:35.02	h	Diana Al-Zamel	Syria	9 April 2008	World Championships	Manchester, Great Britain	
4×50 m freestyle relay								
4×100 m freestyle relay								
4×200 m freestyle relay								
4×50 m medley relay								
4×100 m medley relay								

Legend: # – Record awaiting ratification by Syrian Arab Swimming and Aquatic Sports Federation; WR – World record; AS – Asian record;
Records not set in finals: h – heat; sf – semifinal; r – relay 1st leg; rh – relay heat 1st leg; b – B final; † – en route to final mark; so – swim-off; tt – time trial
