= Malta at the 2017 World Aquatics Championships =

- Flag of Malta
- World Aquatics code: MLT
- National federation: Aquatic Sports Association of Malta
- Website: www.asaofmalta.org

in Budapest, Hungary
- Competitors: 3 in 1 sport
- Medals: Gold 0 Silver 0 Bronze 0 Total 0

World Aquatics Championships appearances
- 1973; 1975; 1978; 1982; 1986; 1991; 1994; 1998; 2001; 2003; 2005; 2007; 2009; 2011; 2013; 2015; 2017; 2019; 2022; 2023; 2024; 2025

Malta competed at the 2017 World Aquatics Championships in Budapest, Hungary from 14 July to 30 July 2017.

== Swimming ==
Malta has received a Universality invitation from FINA to send three swimmers (two men and one woman) to the World Championships.

Athlete	Event	Heat		Semifinal		Final	
Athlete	Event	Time	Rank	Time	Rank	Time	Rank
Mikhail Umnov	Men's 100 m butterfly	55.58	57	did not advance			
Mikhail Umnov	Men's 200 m butterfly	2:06.45	42	did not advance			
Matthew Zammit	Men's 50 m freestyle	23.53	66	did not advance			
Matthew Zammit	Men's 100 m freestyle	52.09	=66	did not advance			
Amy Micallef	Women's 50 m breaststroke	33.46 NR	33	did not advance			
Amy Micallef	Women's 100 m breaststroke	1:12.79 NR	37	did not advance			
