= Syria at the 2022 World Aquatics Championships =

- Flag of Syria
- FINA code: SYR
- National federation: Syrian Arab Swimming and Aquatic Sports Federation

in Budapest, Hungary
- Competitors: 2 in 1 sport
- Medals: Gold 0 Silver 0 Bronze 0 Total 0

World Aquatics Championships appearances
- 1973; 1975; 1978; 1982; 1986; 1991; 1994; 1998; 2001; 2003; 2005; 2007; 2009; 2011; 2013; 2015; 2017; 2019; 2022; 2023; 2024

Syria competed at the 2022 World Aquatics Championships in Budapest, Hungary from 17 June to 3 July.

== Swimming ==
Syria entered two swimmers.

Men

Athlete	Event	Heat		Semifinal		Final	
Athlete	Event	Time	Rank	Time	Rank	Time	Rank
Omar Abbas	100 m freestyle	51.99	63	did not advance			
Omar Abbas	200 m freestyle	1:52.78	46	did not advance			
Ayman Klzie	50 m butterfly	25.04	=51	did not advance			
Ayman Klzie	100 m butterfly	Withdrawn		did not advance			

== See also ==
- List of Syrian records in swimming
