= 2018 FINA World Swimming Championships (25 m) – Mixed 4 × 50 metre medley relay =

Mixed 4 × 50 metre medley relay at the 2018 FINA World Swimming Championships (25 m)
- Venue: Hangzhou Sports Park Stadium
- Dates: 13 December (heats and final)
- Nations: 47
- Winning time: 1:36.40 WR

Medalists
gold medal	Olivia Smoliga; Michael Andrew; Kelsi Dahlia; Caeleb Dressel; Ryan Murphy; Katie Meili; Kendyl Stewart; Michael Chadwick	United States
silver medal	Jesse Puts; Ties Elzerman; Ranomi Kromowidjojo; Femke Heemskerk; Maaike de Waard; Kim Busch	Netherlands
bronze medal	Kliment Kolesnikov; Oleg Kostin; Rozaliya Nasretdinova; Maria Kameneva; Evgeny Rylov; Arina Surkova	Russia

The mixed 4 × 50 metre medley relay competition of the 2018 FINA World Swimming Championships (25 m) was held on 13 December 2018.

== Records ==
Prior to the competition, the existing world and championship records were as follows.

	Name	Nation	Time	Location	Date
World record	Eugene Godsoe (22.88); Kevin Cordes (25.40); Claire Donahue (25.28); Simone Manuel (23.61)	United States	1:37.17	Glasgow	21 December 2013
Championship record	Tom Shields (23.45); Lilly King (28.74); Kelsi Worrell (24.59); Michael Chadwick (20.44)	United States	1:37.22	Windsor, Canada	8 December 2016

The following records were established during the competition:

Date	Event	Name	Nation	Time	Record
13 December	Final	Olivia Smoliga (25.85); Michael Andrew (25.75); Kelsi Dahlia (24.71); Caeleb Dressel (20.09)	United States	1:36.40	WR

== Results ==
=== Heats ===
The heats were started at 11:25.

Rank	Heat	Lane	Nation	Swimmers	Time	Notes
1	5	5	United States	Ryan Murphy (22.77); Katie Meili (29.13); Kendyl Stewart (24.95); Michael Chadwick (20.48)	1:37.33	Q
2	1	2	Germany	Christian Diener (23.09); Fabian Schwingenschlögl (25.91); Aliena Schmidtke (25.23); Jessica Steiger (24.16)	1:38.39	Q
3	5	3	Australia	Mitch Larkin (23.29); Grayson Bell (26.35); Holly Barratt (25.13); Emily Seebohm (23.94)	1:38.71	Q
4	3	5	Italy	Simone Sabbioni (23.18); Fabio Scozzoli (25.97); Elena Di Liddo (25.20); Federica Pellegrini (25.20)	1:38.75	Q
5	4	5	Russia	Evgeny Rylov (23.18); Oleg Kostin (25.67); Arina Surkova (25.71); Rozaliya Nasretdinova (24.29)	1:38.85	Q
6	4	3	Japan	Miyuki Takemura (26.47); Masaki Niiyama (26.03); Takaya Yasue (22.43); Aya Sato (24.07)	1:39.00	Q
7	2	6	Finland	Mimosa Jallow (26.60); Jenna Laukkanen (29.05); Riku Pöytäkivi (22.51); Ari-Pekka Liukkonen (20.86)	1:39.02	Q
7	5	4	Netherlands	Jesse Puts (24.09); Ties Elzerman (25.90); Maaike de Waard (25.14); Kim Busch (23.89)	1:39.02	Q
9	4	8	Brazil	Etiene Medeiros (26.30); João Gomes Júnior (25.93); Nicholas Santos (22.27); Larissa Oliveira (24.74)	1:39.24	R
10	4	4	Belarus	Viktar Staselovich (23.67); Ilya Shymanovich (25.68); Anastasiya Shkurdai (25.43); Nastassia Karakouskaya (24.69)	1:39.47	R
11	3	4	China	Wang Peng (24.47); Wang Lizhuo (26.21); Zhang Yufei (25.70); Wu Yue (23.72)	1:40.10	
12	5	6	Turkey	İskender Başlakov (23.62); Hüseyin Emre Sakçı (26.00); Aleyna Özkan (26.37); Selen Özbilen (24.52)	1:40.51	NR
13	2	5	Austria	Caroline Pilhatsch (26.66); Christopher Rothbauer (26.84); Sascha Subarsky (23.12); Cornelia Pammer (25.29)	1:41.91	
14	4	9	Norway	Markus Lie (23.82); Tomoe Zenimoto Hvas (27.27); Emilie Løvberg (26.95); Susann Bjørnsen (24.13)	1:42.17	
15	3	3	Hong Kong	Stephanie Au (27.81); Kenneth To (26.48); Nicholas Lim (23.91); Sze Hang Yu (24.69)	1:42.89	
16	4	6	Chinese Taipei	Chuang Mu-lun (24.74); Wu Chun-feng (26.64); Huang Mei-chien (26.31); Lin Pei-wun (25.38)	1:43.07	NR
17	2	7	Canada	Ingrid Wilm (27.43); Sophie Angus (30.16); Alexandre Perreault (23.61); Oleksandr Loginov (21.95)	1:43.15	
18	3	8	Bulgaria	Gabriela Georgieva (28.35); Lyubomir Epitropov (27.24); Antani Ivanov (23.46); Diana Petkova (24.52)	1:43.57	
19	4	0	Slovakia	Karolina Hájková (28.20); Marek Botík (26.60); Ádám Halás (23.63); Barbora Mikuskova (25.38)	1:43.81	
20	1	6	New Zealand	Andrew Jeffcoat (24.31); Ciara Smith (32.25); Wilrich Coetzee (23.30); Rebecca Moynihan (24.76)	1:44.62	
21	2	2	Latvia	Ģirts Feldbergs (25.18); Daniils Bobrovs (28.47); Ieva Maļuka (27.81); Gabriela Ņikitina (25.16)	1:46.62	
22	2	1	South Korea	Lee Ju-ho (25.30); Kang Ji-seok (31.98); Park Ye-rin (26.36); Ko Miso (24.94)	1:48.58	
23	1	5	Moldova	Tatiana Salcuțan (29.39); Tatiana Chișca (30.64); Nichita Bortnicov (25.99); Dan Siminel (23.44)	1:49.46	
24	1	1	Panama	Nimia Murua (30.34); Édgar Crespo (27.16); Isaac Beitia Lasso (24.89); María Castillo (27.22)	1:49.61	
25	1	3	Andorra	Mónica Ramírez (29.28); Patrick Pelegrina Cuén (29.02); Bernat Lomero (25.19); Nàdia Tudó Cubells (26.41)	1:49.90	
26	5	7	Costa Rica	Bryan Alvaréz (26.49); Arnoldo Herrera (28.40); Daniela Alfaro (29.01); Beatriz Padrón (26.13)	1:50.03	
27	5	8	Malta	Francesca Falzon Young (30.07); Michael Stafrace (28.76); Mya Azzopardi (29.12); Matt Galea (23.05)	1:51.00	
28	5	2	Seychelles	Therese Soukup (31.91); Samuele Rossi (28.70); Felicity Passon (27.26); Dean Hoffman (23.84)	1:51.71	
29	4	7	Mozambique	Igor Mogne (26.20); Ludovico Corsini (27.80); Jannat Bique (29.94); Alicia Mateus (28.26)	1:52.20	
30	2	8	Kenya	Imara-Bella Thorpe (30.77); Rebecca Kamau (32.59); Ridhwan Mohamed (25.92); Danilo Rosafio (23.23)	1:52.51	
31	3	9	Mauritius	Bradley Vincent (26.02); Elodie Poo-cheong (33.55); Mathieu Marquet (25.74); Camille Koenig (27.58)	1:52.89	
32	4	2	Armenia	Ani Poghosyan (32.74); Varsenik Manucharyan (33.87); Artur Barseghyan (23.99); Vladimir Mamikonyan (22.79)	1:53.39	
33	5	1	Macau	Lin Sizhuang (28.88); Cheang Weng Lam (32.87); Chao Man Hou (23.96); Tan Chi Yan (27.74)	1:53.45	
34	3	1	Mongolia	Enkhkhuslen Batbayar (31.56); Delgerkhuu Myagmar (28.34); Zandanbal Gunsennorov (26.19); Enkhzul Khuyagbaatar (27.93)	1:54.02	
35	4	1	Nicaragua	Eisner Barberena (26.56); Kener Torrez (31.98); Karla Abarca (29.10); María Hernández (26.77)	1:54.41	
36	3	2	Senegal	Ada Thioune (33.16); Amadou Ndiaye (31.42); Abdoul Niane (26.05); Jeanne Boutbien (26.32)	1:56.95	NR
37	2	9	Madagascar	Heriniavo Rasolonjatovo (27.24); Samantha Rakotovelo (37.67); Lalanomena Andrianirina (26.02); Tiana Rabarijaona (28.12)	1:59.05	
38	2	3	Antigua and Barbuda	Noah Mascoll-Gomes (27.39); Bianca Mitchell (38.35); Stefano Mitchell (25.10); Olivia Fuller (28.31)	1:59.15	
39	5	0	Tonga	Finau Ohuafi (29.22); Amini Fonua (29.09); Charissa Panuve (25.10); Noelani Day (29.07)	1:59.74	
40	1	4	Guam	Amanda Joy Poppe (35.68); Benjamin Schulte (27.61); Mineri Kurotori Gomez (32.41); James Hendrix (25.06)	2:00.76	
41	5	9	Papua New Guinea	Josh Tarere (30.74); Leonard Kalate (29.54); Georgia-Leigh Vele (31.37); Rehema Kalate (31.13)	2:02.78	
42	3	0	Turks and Caicos Islands	Alex Maclaren (36.07); Luke Haywood (31.31); Jack Parlee (29.70); Arleigha Hall (28.04)	2:05.12	
43	2	0	Tajikistan	Olimjon Ishanov (30.66); Karina Klimyk (40.76); Fakhriddin Madkamov (27.71); Anastasiya Tyurina (28.80)	2:07.93	
44	2	4	Benin	Nafissath Radji (36.22); Gildas Koumondji (35.87); Jefferson Kpanou (30.13); Laraïba Seibou (30.80)	2:13.02	
45	3	7	Maldives	Aishath Sausan (34.84); Mubal Azzam Ibrahim (35.60); Ali Imaan (31.70); Hamna Ahmed (32.32)	2:14.46	
	1	7	Venezuela	Jeserik Pinto; Carlos Claverie; Isabella Paez; Cristian Quintero	DSQ	
	3	6	Jordan	Mohammed Bedour; Amro Al-Wir; Lara Aklouk; Leedia Alsafadi	DSQ	

=== Final ===
The final was held at 20:50.

Rank	Lane	Nation	Swimmers	Time	Notes
1st place, gold medalist(s)	4	United States	Olivia Smoliga (25.85); Michael Andrew (25.75); Kelsi Dahlia (24.71); Caeleb Dressel (20.09)	1:36.40	WR
2nd place, silver medalist(s)	8	Netherlands	Jesse Puts (23.87); Ties Elzerman (26.01); Ranomi Kromowidjojo (24.27); Femke Heemskerk (22.90)	1:37.05	ER
3rd place, bronze medalist(s)	2	Russia	Kliment Kolesnikov (22.97); Oleg Kostin (25.52); Rozaliya Nasretdinova (25.23); Maria Kameneva (23.61)	1:37.33	NR
4	7	Japan	Miyuki Takemura (26.03); Yasuhiro Koseki (25.64); Takeshi Kawamoto (21.95); Aya Sato (24.05)	1:37.67	
5	6	Italy	Simone Sabbioni (23.10); Fabio Scozzoli (25.47); Elena Di Liddo (25.47); Federica Pellegrini (24.04)	1:38.08	
6	5	Germany	Christian Diener (22.91); Fabian Schwingenschlögl (26.20); Aliena Schmidtke (25.09); Jessica Steiger (24.15)	1:38.35	
7	3	Australia	Mitch Larkin (23.16); Grayson Bell (26.62); Holly Barratt (24.67); Emily Seebohm (24.24)	1:38.69	
8	1	Finland	Mimosa Jallow (26.52); Jenna Laukkanen (29.86); Riku Pöytäkivi (22.35); Ari-Pekka Liukkonen (20.65)	1:39.38	
