= 2018 FINA World Swimming Championships (25 m) – Men's 50 metre breaststroke =

Men's 50 metre breaststroke at the 2018 FINA World Swimming Championships (25 m)
- Venue: Hangzhou Sports Park Stadium
- Dates: 15 December (heats and semifinals); 16 December (final)
- Competitors: 83
- Winning time: 25.41 CR

Medalists
| gold medal | Cameron van der Burgh | South Africa |
| silver medal | Ilya Shymanovich | Belarus |
| bronze medal | Felipe Lima | Brazil |

The Men's 50 metre breaststroke competition of the 2018 FINA World Swimming Championships (25 m) was held on 15 and 16 December 2018 at the Hangzhou Olympic Sports Center.

== Records ==
Prior to the competition, the existing world and championship records were as follows.

| | Name | Nation | Time | Location | Date |
|---|---|---|---|---|---|
| World record | Cameron van der Burgh | South Africa | 25.25 | Berlin | 14 November 2009 |
| Championship record | Felipe França Silva | Brazil | 25.63 | Doha | 7 December 2014 |

The following new records were set during this competition:

| Date | Event | Name | Nation | Time | Record |
|---|---|---|---|---|---|
| 16 December | Final | Cameron van der Burgh | South Africa | 25.41 | CR |

== Results ==
=== Heats ===
The heats were started at 11:31.

| Rank | Heat | Lane | Name | Nationality | Time | Notes |
|---|---|---|---|---|---|---|
| 1 | 8 | 5 | Ilya Shymanovich | Belarus | 25.97 | Q |
| 2 | 7 | 4 | Felipe Lima | Brazil | 26.09 | Q |
| 3 | 7 | 3 | João Gomes Júnior | Brazil | 26.11 | Q |
| 4 | 7 | 7 | Johannes Skagius | Sweden | 26.17 | Q |
| 5 | 9 | 6 | Huseyin Sakci | Turkey | 26.18 | Q |
| 6 | 9 | 1 | Cameron van der Burgh | South Africa | 26.20 | Q |
| 6 | 9 | 4 | Fabio Scozzoli | Italy | 26.20 | Q |
| 8 | 8 | 4 | Kirill Prigoda | Russia | 26.25 | Q |
| 9 | 9 | 5 | Oleg Kostin | Russia | 26.30 | Q |
| 10 | 7 | 5 | Fabian Schwingenschlögl | Germany | 26.32 | Q |
| 11 | 7 | 6 | Nicolò Martinenghi | Italy | 26.34 | Q |
| 12 | 8 | 2 | Yan Zibei | China | 26.42 | Q |
| 12 | 9 | 3 | Yasuhiro Koseki | Japan | 26.42 | Q |
| 14 | 8 | 1 | Masaki Niiyama | Japan | 26.45 | Q |
| 15 | 7 | 2 | Ties Elzerman | Netherlands | 26.56 | Q |
| 16 | 9 | 2 | Wang Lizhuo | China | 26.57 | Q |
| 17 | 7 | 9 | Andrew Wilson | United States | 26.58 | |
| 18 | 8 | 3 | Michael Andrew | United States | 26.62 | |
| 19 | 7 | 1 | Andrei Tuomola | Finland | 26.66 | |
| 20 | 9 | 7 | Arno Kamminga | Netherlands | 26.70 | |
| 21 | 6 | 4 | Anton Sveinn McKee | Iceland | 26.74 | |
| 21 | 8 | 6 | Renato Prono | Paraguay | 26.74 | |
| 23 | 7 | 8 | Grayson Bell | Australia | 26.75 | |
| 24 | 9 | 0 | Bernhard Reitshammer | Austria | 26.85 | |
| 25 | 6 | 5 | Wu Chun-feng | Chinese Taipei | 26.88 | |
| 26 | 8 | 8 | Marek Botík | Slovakia | 26.93 | |
| 27 | 5 | 4 | Youssef El-Kamash | Egypt | 26.97 | |
| 28 | 7 | 0 | Christopher Rothbauer | Austria | 27.04 | |
| 29 | 8 | 9 | Nikola Obrovac | Croatia | 27.06 | |
| 30 | 8 | 0 | Brad Tandy | South Africa | 27.10 | |
| 31 | 9 | 9 | Martin Allikvee | Estonia | 27.21 | |
| 32 | 8 | 7 | Giedrius Titenis | Lithuania | 27.23 | |
| 33 | 6 | 8 | Édgar Crespo | Panama | 27.27 | |
| 34 | 6 | 6 | Azad Al-Barzi | Syria | 27.28 | |
| 34 | 6 | 7 | Thibaut Capitaine | France | 27.28 | |
| 36 | 6 | 2 | Jolann Bovey | Switzerland | 27.31 | |
| 37 | 5 | 5 | Carlos Claverie | Venezuela | 27.37 | |
| 38 | 9 | 8 | Ari-Pekka Liukkonen | Finland | 27.38 | |
| 39 | 6 | 1 | Darragh Greene | Ireland | 27.43 | |
| 40 | 3 | 0 | Kirill Vais | Kyrgyzstan | 27.50 | NR |
| 41 | 6 | 0 | Carlos Mahecha | Colombia | 27.55 | |
| 42 | 6 | 9 | Martin Melconian | Uruguay | 27.60 | |
| 43 | 6 | 3 | Dávid Horváth | Hungary | 27.71 | |
| 44 | 4 | 2 | Santiago Cavanagh | Bolivia | 27.96 | |
| 45 | 3 | 7 | Benjamin Schulte | Guam | 28.05 | |
| 46 | 5 | 2 | Ludovico Corsini | Mozambique | 28.12 | |
| 47 | 5 | 6 | Serginni Marten | Curaçao | 28.25 | |
| 48 | 5 | 8 | Sebastien Kouma | Mali | 28.37 | |
| 49 | 2 | 1 | Zandanbal Gunsennorov | Mongolia | 28.49 | |
| 50 | 5 | 7 | Epeli Rabua | Fiji | 28.61 | |
| 51 | 5 | 3 | Malcolm Richardson | Cook Islands | 28.63 | |
| 52 | 5 | 9 | Samuele Rossi | Seychelles | 28.67 | |
| 53 | 2 | 7 | Amini Fonua | Tonga | 28.73 | |
| 54 | 5 | 0 | Ronan Wantenaar | Namibia | 28.75 | |
| 55 | 4 | 1 | Tasi Limtiaco | Federated States of Micronesia | 28.89 | |
| 56 | 5 | 1 | Michael Stafrace | Malta | 29.14 | |
| 57 | 4 | 3 | Brandon Cheong | Aruba | 29.34 | |
| 58 | 4 | 6 | Patrick Pelegrina Cuén | Andorra | 29.35 | |
| 59 | 4 | 4 | Mario Ervedosa | Angola | 29.38 | |
| 60 | 4 | 7 | Muis Ahmad | Bahrain | 29.65 | |
| 61 | 4 | 5 | Alexandros Axiotis | Zambia | 29.66 | |
| 62 | 3 | 9 | Kitso Matija | Botswana | 30.21 | |
| 63 | 2 | 4 | Daniel Scott | Guyana | 30.57 | |
| 64 | 4 | 8 | Alejandro Panting | Honduras | 30.63 | |
| 65 | 3 | 6 | Abdulmalik Ben Musa | Libya | 31.30 | |
| 66 | 3 | 8 | Slava Sihanouvong | Laos | 31.51 | |
| 67 | 2 | 9 | Luke Haywood | Turks and Caicos Islands | 31.62 | |
| 68 | 2 | 3 | Shuvam Shrestha | Nepal | 32.02 | |
| 69 | 4 | 9 | Yaya Yeressa | Guinea | 33.12 | |
| 70 | 4 | 0 | Clayment Lafiara | Solomon Islands | 33.37 | |
| 71 | 1 | 5 | Alassane Seydou Lancina | Niger | 34.29 | |
| 72 | 3 | 2 | Hamid Rahimi | Afghanistan | 35.29 | |
| 73 | 3 | 4 | Gildas Koumondji | Benin | 35.96 | |
| 74 | 2 | 6 | Abdelmalik Muktar | Ethiopia | 36.02 | |
| 75 | 3 | 3 | Hollingsword Wolul | Vanuatu | 36.39 | |
| 76 | 2 | 8 | Alie Kamara | Sierra Leone | 36.76 | |
| 77 | 2 | 5 | Darshan Koffi | Togo | 37.99 | |
| 78 | 1 | 4 | Ebenezer Osabutey | Ghana | 38.18 | |
| 79 | 1 | 3 | Mamadi Jarju | Gambia | 39.51 | |
| 80 | 2 | 0 | Houssein Gaber Ibrahim | Djibouti | 39.83 | |
| | 2 | 2 | Tindwende Sawadogo | Burkina Faso | DNS | |
| | 3 | 1 | Amini Harindimana | Rwanda | DNS | |
| | 3 | 5 | Phillip Kinono | Marshall Islands | DSQ | |

=== Semifinals ===
The semifinals were held at 20:01.

==== Semifinal 1 ====
| Rank | Lane | Name | Nationality | Time | Notes |
|---|---|---|---|---|---|
| 1 | 3 | Cameron van der Burgh | South Africa | 25.76 | Q |
| 2 | 2 | Fabian Schwingenschlögl | Germany | 25.87 | Q |
| 3 | 6 | Kirill Prigoda | Russia | 25.95 | Q |
| 4 | 4 | Felipe Lima | Brazil | 26.01 | Q |
| 5 | 5 | Johannes Skagius | Sweden | 26.18 | |
| 6 | 8 | Wang Lizhuo | China | 26.20 | |
| 7 | 7 | Yan Zibei | China | 26.22 | |
| 8 | 1 | Masaki Niiyama | Japan | 26.27 | |

==== Semifinal 2 ====
| Rank | Lane | Name | Nationality | Time | Notes |
|---|---|---|---|---|---|
| 1 | 5 | João Gomes Júnior | Brazil | 25.94 | Q |
| 2 | 4 | Ilya Shymanovich | Belarus | 25.95 | Q |
| 3 | 3 | Huseyin Sakci | Turkey | 25.97 | Q |
| 4 | 2 | Oleg Kostin | Russia | 26.00 | Q |
| 5 | 7 | Nicolo Martinenghi | Italy | 26.03 | |
| 6 | 6 | Fabio Scozzoli | Italy | 26.04 | |
| 7 | 8 | Ties Elzerman | Netherlands | 26.40 | |
| 8 | 1 | Yasuhiro Koseki | Japan | 26.70 | |

=== Final ===
The final was held at 19:21.

| Rank | Lane | Name | Nationality | Time | Notes |
|---|---|---|---|---|---|
| 1st place, gold medalist(s) | 4 | Cameron van der Burgh | South Africa | 25.41 | CR |
| 2nd place, silver medalist(s) | 2 | Ilya Shymanovich | Belarus | 25.77 | NR |
| 3rd place, bronze medalist(s) | 8 | Felipe Lima | Brazil | 25.80 | |
| 4 | 6 | Kirill Prigoda | Russia | 25.83 | |
| 5 | 7 | Huseyin Sakci | Turkey | 25.89 | |
| 6 | 3 | João Gomes Júnior | Brazil | 26.02 | |
| 7 | 5 | Fabian Schwingenschlögl | Germany | 26.12 | |
| 8 | 1 | Oleg Kostin | Russia | 26.18 | |
