= 2018 FINA World Swimming Championships (25 m) – Women's 50 metre freestyle =

Women's 50 metre freestyle at the 2018 FINA World Swimming Championships (25 m)
- Venue: Hangzhou Olympic Sports Center
- Dates: 15 December (heats and semifinals); 16 December (final)
- Competitors: 97
- Winning time: 23.19

Medalists
gold medal	Ranomi Kromowidjojo	Netherlands
silver medal	Femke Heemskerk	Netherlands
bronze medal	Etiene Medeiros	Brazil

The Women's 50 metre freestyle competition of the 2018 FINA World Swimming Championships (25 m) was held on 15 and 16 December 2018 at the Hangzhou Olympic Sports Center.

== Records ==
Prior to the competition, the existing world and championship records were as follows.

	Name	Nation	Time	Location	Date
World record	Ranomi Kromowidjojo	Netherlands	22.93	Berlin	7 August 2017
Championship record	Marleen Veldhuis	Netherlands	23.25	Manchester	13 April 2008

== Results ==
=== Heats ===
The heats were started on 15 December at 11:09.

Rank	Heat	Lane	Name	Nationality	Time	Notes
1	8	4	Femke Heemskerk	Netherlands	23.90	Q
2	9	5	Mariia Kameneva	Russia	23.93	Q
3	10	6	Holly Barratt	Australia	23.94	Q
4	9	3	Etiene Medeiros	Brazil	24.00	Q
5	10	4	Ranomi Kromowidjojo	Netherlands	24.07	Q
6	9	1	Mallory Comerford	United States	24.18	Q
6	10	3	Anika Apostalon	Czech Republic	24.18	Q
8	10	5	Zhu Menghui	China	24.20	Q
9	10	7	Aya Sato	Japan	24.23	Q
10	8	1	Madison Kennedy	United States	24.24	Q
11	8	6	Wu Yue	China	24.25	Q
12	10	1	Melanie Henique	France	24.31	Q
13	8	3	Michelle Coleman	Sweden	24.39	Q
14	8	2	Erin Gallagher	South Africa	24.41	Q, AF
15	10	2	Lidón Muñoz	Spain	24.60	Q
16	9	4	Rozaliya Nasretdinova	Russia	24.62	Q
17	9	6	Mimosa Jallow	Finland	24.65	R
18	9	7	Barbora Seemanová	Czech Republic	24.76	R
19	8	7	Nastassia Karakouskaya	Belarus	24.80	
20	10	0	Isabella Arcila	Colombia	24.83	
21	9	2	Susann Bjørnsen	Norway	24.87	
22	7	3	Ko Miso	South Korea	25.16	
22	8	9	Diana Petkova	Bulgaria	25.16	
24	9	9	Jeserik Pinto	Venezuela	25.17	
25	10	9	Neža Klančar	Slovenia	25.19	
26	9	0	Sze Hang Yu	Hong Kong	25.44	
27	8	8	Selen Özbilen	Turkey	25.46	
28	8	0	Rebecca Moynihan	New Zealand	25.51	
29	7	5	Karen Torrez	Bolivia	25.53	
30	10	8	Gabriela Ņikitina	Latvia	25.63	
31	7	4	Ingibjörg Kristín Jónsdóttir	Iceland	25.67	
32	7	6	Barbora Mikuskova	Slovakia	25.78	
32	9	8	Rūta Meilutytė	Lithuania	25.78	
34	7	8	Lamija Medošević	Bosnia and Herzegovina	25.80	NR
35	4	8	Pak Mi-song	North Korea	25.91	
36	7	2	Francesca Falzon Young	Malta	26.03	NR
37	7	0	Bayan Jumah	Syria	26.24	NR
38	6	3	Ariel Weech	Bahamas	26.28	
39	7	9	Mariel Mencia	Dominican Republic	26.40	NR
40	7	1	Inés Remersaro	Uruguay	26.41	
41	6	2	Elisabeth Timmer	Aruba	26.51	
42	7	7	Yolani Julia Blake	Fiji	26.54	
43	6	1	Tonia Papapetrou	Cyprus	26.57	
44	6	7	Nikol Merizaj	Albania	26.68	NR
45	6	8	Varsenik Manucharyan	Armenia	26.80	
46	6	4	Jeanne Boutbien	Senegal	26.81	NR
47	6	5	Noura Mana	Morocco	27.07	
48	1	7	Savindi Jayaweera	Sri Lanka	27.15	
49	4	0	Arleigha Hall	Turks and Caicos Islands	27.31	
50	6	0	Mariam Imnadze	Georgia	27.37	
51	2	3	Enkhzul Khuyagbaatar	Mongolia	27.44	
52	6	9	Fjorda Shabani	Kosovo	27.45	
53	3	5	Olivia Fuller	Antigua and Barbuda	27.58	
54	3	4	Maayaa Ayawere	Ghana	27.60	
55	4	1	María Castillo	Panama	27.73	
56	2	4	Abiola Ogunbanwo	Nigeria	27.83	
57	6	6	Tan Chi Yan	Macau	27.88	
58	5	8	Daila Ismatul	Guatemala	28.00	
59	5	3	Colleen Furgeson	Marshall Islands	28.32	
60	5	4	Jamila Sanmoogan	Guyana	28.33	
61	5	5	Selina Katumba	Uganda	28.42	
62	3	8	Jannat Bique	Mozambique	28.68	
63	2	0	Andrea Schuster	Samoa	28.81	
64	5	1	Margie Winter	Federated States of Micronesia	28.86	
65	5	9	Georgia-Leigh Vele	Papua New Guinea	28.89	
66	2	1	Larissa Joassaint	Haiti	28.91	
67	3	7	Mary Al-Atrash	Palestine	28.95	
68	1	4	Noelani Day	Tonga	29.04	
69	5	2	Ammara Pinto	Malawi	29.07	
70	2	8	Anastasiya Tyurina	Tajikistan	29.24	
71	5	6	Samantha Rakotovelo	Madagascar	29.39	
72	4	9	Tisa Shakya	Nepal	29.46	
73	1	5	Anna-Sica Guerard	Togo	29.55	
74	3	0	Alaa Binrajab	Bahrain	29.81	
75	3	9	Daniela Costa	Angola	29.90	
76	5	7	Catarina Ferreira	Cape Verde	29.97	
77	1	1	Sonia Aktar	Bangladesh	30.21	
78	4	5	Nafissath Radji	Benin	30.40	
79	4	3	Senamile Dlamini	Eswatini	30.88	
80	4	4	Siri Arun Budcharern	Laos	31.19	
81	5	0	Kayla Temba	Tanzania	31.37	
82	2	6	San Bopha	Cambodia	32.87	
83	4	2	Wendy Charles	Solomon Islands	34.16	
84	3	3	Odrina Kaze	Burundi	34.72	
85	2	5	Haneen Ibrahim	Sudan	34.86	
86	3	1	Roukaya Mahamane	Niger	34.91	
87	2	9	Lina Selo	Ethiopia	35.42	
88	4	7	Safia Houssein Barkat	Djibouti	35.77	
89	3	6	Raaidah Aqeel	Pakistan	36.15	
90	3	2	Tity Dumbuya	Sierra Leone	36.71	
91	1	2	Gniene Faouzia Sessouma	Burkina Faso	38.94	
92	1	3	Ana Oafini	Timor-Leste	41.11	
93	2	7	Sainabou Sam	Gambia	46.14	
	1	6	Lucie Kouadio-Patinier	Ivory Coast	DNS	
	2	2	Fatoumata Samassékou	Mali	DNS	
	4	6	Chloe Sauvourel	Central African Republic	DNS	
	8	5	Larissa Oliveira	Brazil	DNS	

=== Semifinals ===
The semifinals were held on 15 December at 19:47.

==== Semifinal 1 ====
Rank	Lane	Name	Nationality	Time	Notes
1	5	Etiene Medeiros	Brazil	23.82	Q, =AM
2	3	Mallory Comerford	United States	23.83	Q
3	4	Maria Kameneva	Russia	23.87	Q
4	6	Zhu Menghui	China	23.95	Q, AS
5	2	Madison Kennedy	United States	24.00	Q
6	7	Melanie Henique	France	24.14	R
7	1	Erin Gallagher	South Africa	24.38	AF
8	8	Rozaliya Nasretdinova	Russia	24.47	

==== Semifinal 2 ====
Rank	Lane	Name	Nationality	Time	Notes
1	3	Ranomi Kromowidjojo	Netherlands	23.50	Q
2	4	Femke Heemskerk	Netherlands	23.75	Q
3	5	Holly Barratt	Australia	23.89	Q
4	1	Michelle Coleman	Sweden	24.21	R
5	2	Aya Sato	Japan	24.25	
6	6	Anika Apostalon	Czech Republic	24.30	
7	7	Wu Yue	China	24.33	
8	8	Lidón Muñoz del Campo	Spain	24.75	

=== Final ===
The Final was held on 16 December at 19:33.

Rank	Lane	Name	Nationality	Time	Notes
1st place, gold medalist(s)	4	Ranomi Kromowidjojo	Netherlands	23.19	CR
2nd place, silver medalist(s)	5	Femke Heemskerk	Netherlands	23.67	
3rd place, bronze medalist(s)	3	Etiene Medeiros	Brazil	23.76	AM
4	6	Mallory Comerford	United States	23.86	
5	7	Holly Barratt	Australia	23.92	
5	8	Melanie Henique	France	24.01	
7	2	Maria Kameneva	Russia	24.06	
8	1	Madison Kennedy	United States	24.11	
