= Syria at the 2024 World Aquatics Championships =

- Flag of Syria
- FINA code: SYR
- National federation: Syrian Arab Swimming and Aquatic Sports Federation

in Doha, Qatar
- Competitors: 3 in 1 sport
- Medals: Gold 0 Silver 0 Bronze 0 Total 0

World Aquatics Championships appearances
- 1973; 1975; 1978; 1982; 1986; 1991; 1994; 1998; 2001; 2003; 2005; 2007; 2009; 2011; 2013; 2015; 2017; 2019; 2022; 2023; 2024

Syria competed at the 2024 World Aquatics Championships in Doha, Qatar from 2 to 18 February.

== Competitors ==
The following is the list of competitors in the Championships.

Sport	Men	Women	Total
Swimming	2	1	3
Total	2	1	3

== Swimming ==
Syria entered 3 swimmers.

Men

Athlete	Event	Heat		Semifinal		Final	
Athlete	Event	Time	Rank	Time	Rank	Time	Rank
Omar Abbass	200 metre freestyle	1:54.28	50	Did not advance			
Omar Abbass	400 metre freestyle	4:03.21	41	—		Did not advance	
Osama Trabulsi	100 metre freestyle	54.49	82	Did not advance			
Osama Trabulsi	100 metre breaststroke	1:08.62	65	Did not advance			

Women

Athlete	Event	Heat		Semifinal		Final	
Athlete	Event	Time	Rank	Time	Rank	Time	Rank
Inana Soleman	200 metre butterfly	2:23.21	23	Did not advance			
Inana Soleman	200 metre individual medley	2:27.15	23	Did not advance			
