= Malta at the 2015 World Aquatics Championships =

- Flag of Malta
- FINA code: MLT
- National federation: Aquatic Sports Association of Malta
- Website: www.asaofmalta.org

in Kazan, Russia
- Competitors: 4 in 1 sport
- Medals: Gold 0 Silver 0 Bronze 0 Total 0

World Aquatics Championships appearances
- 1973; 1975; 1978; 1982; 1986; 1991; 1994; 1998; 2001; 2003; 2005; 2007; 2009; 2011; 2013; 2015; 2017; 2019; 2022; 2023; 2024

Malta competed at the 2015 World Aquatics Championships in Kazan, Russia from 24 July to 9 August 2015.

== Swimming ==
Maltese swimmers have achieved qualifying standards in the following events (up to a maximum of 2 swimmers in each event at the A-standard entry time, and 1 at the B-standard):

Men

| Athlete | Event | Heat | | Semifinal | | Final | |
| Athlete | Event | Time | Rank | Time | Rank | Time | Rank |
|---|---|---|---|---|---|---|---|
| Andrew Chetcuti | 50 m freestyle | 23.43 | 46 | did not advance | | | |
| Andrew Chetcuti | 100 m freestyle | 51.35 | 63 | did not advance | | | |
| Julian Harding | 50 m breaststroke | 29.93 | 53 | did not advance | | | |
| Julian Harding | 100 m breaststroke | 1:07.28 | 64 | did not advance | | | |

Women

| Athlete | Event | Heat | | Semifinal | | Final | |
| Athlete | Event | Time | Rank | Time | Rank | Time | Rank |
|---|---|---|---|---|---|---|---|
| Nicola Muscat | 50 m freestyle | 27.10 | 59 | did not advance | | | |
| Nicola Muscat | 100 m freestyle | 1:00.07 | 69 | did not advance | | | |
| Amy Micallef | 50 m breaststroke | 34.78 | 52 | did not advance | | | |
| Amy Micallef | 100 m breaststroke | 1:16.02 | 53 | did not advance | | | |
