= 2018 FINA World Swimming Championships (25 m) – Men's 100 metre breaststroke =

Men's 100 metre breaststroke at the 2018 FINA World Swimming Championships (25 m)
- Venue: Hangzhou Sports Park Stadium
- Dates: 11 December (heats and semifinals); 12 December (final)
- Competitors: 76
- Winning time: 56.01 CR

Medalists
gold medal	Cameron van der Burgh	South Africa
silver medal	Ilya Shymanovich	Belarus
bronze medal	Yasuhiro Koseki	Japan

The Men's 100 metre breaststroke competition of the 2018 FINA World Swimming Championships (25 m) was held on 11 and 12 December 2018 at the Hangzhou Olympic Sports Center.

== Records ==
Prior to the competition, the existing world and championship records were as follows.

	Name	Nation	Time	Location	Date
World record	Cameron van der Burgh	South Africa	55.61	Berlin	15 November 2009
Championship record	Felipe França Silva	Brazil	56.29	Doha	4 December 2014

The following new records were set during this competition:

Date	Event	Name	Nation	Time	Record
12 December	Final	Cameron van der Burgh	South Africa	56.01	CR

== Results ==
=== Heats ===
The heats were started at 11:25.

Rank	Heat	Lane	Name	Nationality	Time	Notes
1	6	5	Ilya Shymanovich	Belarus	56.47	Q
2	7	4	Fabio Scozzoli	Italy	56.94	Q
3	5	4	Andrew Wilson	United States	57.01	Q
4	8	6	Wang Lizhuo	China	57.03	Q
5	7	3	Felipe Lima	Brazil	57.14	Q
6	8	5	Yasuhiro Koseki	Japan	57.15	Q
7	8	4	Kirill Prigoda	Russia	57.17	Q
8	7	6	Nicolo Martinenghi	Italy	57.27	Q
9	7	2	Cameron van der Burgh	South Africa	57.39	Q
10	8	3	Arno Kamminga	Netherlands	57.41	Q
11	6	6	Hayato Watanabe	Japan	57.53	Q
12	5	3	Anton Sveinn McKee	Iceland	57.57	Q
12	6	3	Fabian Schwingenschlögl	Germany	57.57	Q
14	7	1	Marco Koch	Germany	57.60	Q
15	8	2	João Gomes Júnior	Brazil	57.62	Q
16	6	2	Michael Andrew	United States	57.63	
17	7	5	Yan Zibei	China	57.65	
18	6	0	Hüseyin Emre Sakçı	Turkey	57.76	
19	8	1	Erik Persson	Sweden	57.83	
20	6	4	Oleg Kostin	Russia	57.85	
21	7	9	Tomáš Klobučník	Slovakia	58.11	
22	7	7	Andrius Šidlauskas	Lithuania	58.20	
23	8	7	Giedrius Titenis	Lithuania	58.50	
24	6	1	Grayson Bell	Australia	58.54	
25	6	8	Martin Allikvee	Estonia	58.61	
25	7	0	Yannick Käser	Switzerland	58.61	
27	8	0	Thibaut Capitaine	France	58.72	
28	6	7	Peter John Stevens	Slovenia	58.73	
29	8	9	Dávid Horváth	Hungary	58.86	
30	5	6	Darragh Greene	Ireland	58.91	
30	7	8	Chao Man Hou	Macau	58.91	
32	5	1	Carlos Claverie	Venezuela	58.98	
33	6	9	Renato Prono	Paraguay	59.35	
34	4	2	Édgar Crespo	Panama	59.40	
35	5	9	Youssef El-Kamash	Egypt	59.61	
36	5	5	Nikola Obrovac	Croatia	59.86	
37	5	8	Lyubomir Epitropov	Bulgaria	59.92	
38	5	2	Azad Al-Barzi	Syria	1:00.05	
39	1	5	Cai Bing-rong	Chinese Taipei	1:00.09	
40	4	5	Carlos Mahecha	Colombia	1:00.31	
41	4	6	Denis Petrashov	Kyrgyzstan	1:00.49	
42	5	7	Martin Melconian	Uruguay	1:00.67	
43	4	4	Mykyta Koptielov	Ukraine	1:00.98	
44	5	0	George Schroder	New Zealand	1:01.09	
45	4	7	Taichi Vakasama	Fiji	1:01.16	
46	4	0	Santiago Cavanagh	Bolivia	1:01.29	
47	4	1	Adriel Sanes	United States Virgin Islands	1:01.87	
47	4	3	Serginni Marten	Curaçao	1:01.87	
49	2	9	Benjamin Schulte	Guam	1:02.01	
50	3	5	Sebastien Kouma	Mali	1:02.11	
51	3	3	Arnoldo Herrera	Costa Rica	1:02.20	
52	4	9	Amro Al-Wir	Jordan	1:02.78	
53	1	4	Zandanbal Gunsennorov	Mongolia	1:02.93	
54	3	6	Ronan Wantenaar	Namibia	1:03.51	
55	3	0	Samuele Rossi	Seychelles	1:03.52	
56	3	2	Liam Davis	Zimbabwe	1:03.93	
57	3	1	Filipe Gomes	Malawi	1:04.18	
57	3	4	Ludovico Corsini	Mozambique	1:04.18	
59	4	8	Michael Stafrace	Malta	1:04.19	
60	2	3	Muis Ahmad	Bahrain	1:04.45	
61	3	7	Alexandros Axiotis	Zambia	1:04.58	
62	3	8	Mario Ervedosa	Angola	1:04.60	
63	3	9	Leonard Kalate	Papua New Guinea	1:04.89	
64	2	5	Brandon Cheong	Aruba	1:05.48	
65	2	4	Patrick Pelegrina Cuén	Andorra	1:05.60	
66	2	7	Shane Cadogan	Saint Vincent and the Grenadines	1:05.78	
67	2	6	Vali Israfilov	Azerbaijan	1:07.29	
68	1	3	Abdulmalik Ben Musa	Libya	1:08.59	
69	2	0	Luke Haywood	Turks and Caicos Islands	1:09.30	
70	1	2	Shuvam Shrestha	Nepal	1:09.43	
71	2	1	Yaya Yeressa	Guinea	1:15.15	
72	2	8	Gildas Koumondji	Benin	1:21.44	
73	1	7	Ebenezer Osabutey	Ghana	1:24.49	
	1	6	Ramah Arifi	Afghanistan	DSQ	
	2	2	Nkosi Dunwoody	Barbados	DSQ	
	8	8	Ari-Pekka Liukkonen	Finland	DSQ	

=== Semifinals ===
The semifinals were held at 20:04.

==== Semifinal 1 ====
Rank	Lane	Name	Nationality	Time	Notes
1	4	Fabio Scozzoli	Italy	56.30	Q
2	3	Yasuhiro Koseki	Japan	56.42	Q
3	5	Wang Lizhuo	China	56.89	Q
4	2	Arno Kamminga	Netherlands	57.09	Q
5	8	Michael Andrew	United States	57.24	
6	1	Marco Koch	Germany	57.39	
7	6	Nicolo Martinenghi	Italy	57.47	
8	7	Anton Sveinn McKee	Iceland	57.94	

==== Semifinal 2 ====
Rank	Lane	Name	Nationality	Time	Notes
1	6	Kirill Prigoda	Russia	56.31	Q
2	4	Ilya Shymanovich	Belarus	56.43	Q
3	2	Cameron van der Burgh	South Africa	56.90	Q
4	5	Andrew Wilson	United States	56.92	Q
5	1	Fabian Schwingenschlögl	Germany	57.21	
6	8	João Gomes Júnior	Brazil	57.26	
7	3	Felipe Lima	Brazil	57.30	
8	7	Hayato Watanabe	Japan	57.51	

=== Final ===
The final was held at 19:29.

Rank	Lane	Name	Nationality	Time	Notes
1st place, gold medalist(s)	7	Cameron van der Burgh	South Africa	56.01	CR
2nd place, silver medalist(s)	6	Ilya Shymanovich	Belarus	56.10	NR
3rd place, bronze medalist(s)	3	Yasuhiro Koseki	Japan	56.13	AS
4	4	Fabio Scozzoli	Italy	56.48	
5	5	Kirill Prigoda	Russia	56.56	
6	2	Wang Lizhuo	China	56.91	
7	8	Arno Kamminga	Netherlands	57.10	
8	1	Andrew Wilson	United States	57.19	
