= List of Maltese records in swimming =

Below is a complete list of the Maltese records in swimming, which are ratified by the Aquatic Sports Association of Malta.

== Long course (50 m) ==
=== Men ===
Event	Time		Name	Club	Date	Meet	Location	Ref
50 m freestyle	22.79		Kyle Micallef	Neptunes WPSC	28 June 2025	Maltese Championships	Cospicua, Malta	
50 m freestyle	22.68	not ratified	Kyle Micallef	Malta	1 June 2023	Games of the Small States of Europe	Msida, Malta	
100 m freestyle	50.92	b	Andrew Chetcuti	Sirens ASC	5 May 2017	Arena Pro Swim Series	Atlanta, United States	
200 m freestyle	1:53.30	r	Andrew Chetcuti	-	1 July 2016	Maltese Championships	Gżira, Malta	
400 m freestyle	4:00.17		Dylan Cachia	Sliema ASC	14 July 2021	7th Time Trials	Gzira, Malta	
800 m freestyle	8:22.73		Dylan Cachia	Malta	30 May 2023	Games of the Small States of Europe	Msida, Malta	
1500 m freestyle	16:06.96		Dylan Cachia	Malta	2 June 2023	Games of the Small States of Europe	Msida, Malta	
50 m backstroke	26.78	h	Ryan Gambin	Malta	20 March 2008	European Championships	Eindhoven, Netherlands	
100 m backstroke	59.52	h	Thomas Wareing	Malta	31 May 2023	Games of the Small States of Europe	Msida, Malta	
200 m backstroke	2:07.39		Thomas Wareing	Malta	30 May 2023	Games of the Small States of Europe	Msida, Malta	
50 m breaststroke	28.98		Julian Harding	Sliema ASC	28 June 2015	Maltese Championships	Msida, Malta	
100 m breaststroke	1:05.01		Julian Harding	Neptunes WPSC	11 April 2015	Easter International Meet	Malta, Malta	
200 m breaststroke	2:19.72		Michael Umnov	Sirens ASC	2 July 2016	Maltese Championships	Gzira, Malta	
50m butterfly	24.47	b	Andrew Chetcuti	Malta	30 January 2016	Luxembourg Euro-Meet	Luxembourg, Luxembourg	
100m butterfly	53.70	h	Ryan Gambin	Malta	14 August 2008	Olympic Games	Beijing, China	
200m butterfly	2:03.30		Nathan Cachia	Sliema ASC	24 May 2026	AP Race London International	London, United Kingdom	
200m individual medley	2:06.75	h	Matthew Satariano	Malta	8 July 2026	European Junior Championships	Munich, Germany	
400m individual medley	4:30.67	b	Matthew Satariano	Sliema ASC	23 May 2026	AP Race London International	London, United Kingdom	
4×50m freestyle relay	1:35.31		Matthew Zammit (23.31); Raoul Stafrace; Matthew Galea; Neil Muscat	-	November 2014	-	Bolzano, Italy	
4×100m freestyle relay	3:28.67		Matthew Galea (53.30); Harry Stacey (50.65); Andrew Chetcuti (51.34); Dylan Cachia (53.38)	Malta	28 May 2019	Games of the Small States of Europe	Podgorica, Montenegro	
4×200m freestyle relay	7:46.32		Andrew Chetcuti (1:57.57); Harry Stacey (1:54.30); Matthew Galea (1:56.89); Dylan Cachia (1:57.56)	Malta	29 May 2019	Games of the Small States of Europe	Podgorica, Montenegro	
4×50m medley relay	1:45.72		Neil Muscat (27.62); Julian Harding (29.46); Matthew Zammit (25.54); Raoul Stafrace (23.10)	Neptunes WPSC	19 July 2014	Maltese Championships	Msida, Malta	
4×100m medley relay	3:51.81		Thomas Wareing (1:00.37); Michael Stafrace (1:04.78); Michael Umnov (56.07); Harry Stacey (50.59)	Malta	30 May 2019	Games of the Small States of Europe	Podgorica, Montenegro	

Legend: # – Record awaiting ratification by ASA Malta; WR – World record; ER – European record; e – equalled existing record;
Records not set in finals: h – heat; sf – semifinal; r – relay 1st leg; rh – relay heat 1st leg; b – B final; † – en route to final mark; so – swim-off; tt – time trial

=== Women ===
Event	Time		Name	Club	Date	Meet	Location	Ref
50 m freestyle	26.19		Nicola Muscat	Neptunes WP	28 June 2015	Maltese Championships	Msida, Malta	
100 m freestyle	57.73		Mya Azzopardi	Neptunes WPSC	30 June 2025	Maltese Championships	Cospicua, Malta	
200 m freestyle	2:02.47	b	Sasha Gatt	Sliema ASC	24 May 2026	AP Race London International	London, United Kingdom	
400 m freestyle	4:16.36		Sasha Gatt	Sirens ASC	24 April 2025	Easter International Meet	Gzira, Malta	
800 m freestyle	8:46.69		Sasha Gatt	Sliema ASC	25 May 2026	AP Race London International	London, United Kingdom	
1500 m freestyle	16:38.75		Sasha Gatt	Malta	10 July 2021	European Junior Championships	Rome, Italy	
50m backstroke	30.45		Francesca Falzon Young	Sirens ASC	6 April 2018	Guess Easter International Meet	Gzira, Malta	
100m backstroke	1:06.12	h	Mya Azzopardi	Neptunes WPSC	28 June 2025	Maltese Championships	Cospicua, Malta	
200m backstroke	2:23.14		Victoria Balderacchi	Malta	30 May 2023	Games of the Small States of Europe	Msida, Malta	
50m breaststroke	33.44	h	Alexandra McGonigle	Malta	18 May 2018	Cij Meet	Luxembourg, Luxembourg	
100m breaststroke	1:12.79	h	Amy Micallef	Malta	24 July 2017	World Championships	Budapest, Hungary	
200m breaststroke	2:36.00		Amy Micallef	Sirens ASC	26 April 2019	Easter International Swim Meet	Gzira, Malta	
50m butterfly	28.00		Michela Portelli	Sirens ASC	4 April 2024	Easter International Meet	Gzira, Malta	
100m butterfly	1:03.15		Michela Portelli	Sirens ASC	5 April 2024	Easter International Meet	Gzira, Malta	
200m butterfly	2:19.67		Angela Galea	-	June 2003	-	Msida, Malta	
200m individual medley	2:21.58		Mya Azzopardi	Malta	28 May 2019	Games of the Small States of Europe	Podgorica, Montenegro	
400m individual medley	5:06.06		Mya Azzopardi	Malta	30 May 2019	Games of the Small States of Europe	Podgorica, Montenegro	
4×100m freestyle relay	3:57.61		Mya Azzopardi (58.93); Francesca Falzon Young (59.61); Martina Valletta (1:00.51); Michelle Van Rooyen (58.56)	Malta	28 May 2019	Games of the Small States of Europe	Podgorica, Montenegro	
4×200m freestyle relay	8:32.44		Mya Azzopardi (2:07.20); Michelle Van Rooyen (2:05.51); Sasha Gatt (2:12.36); Francesca Falzon Young (2:07.37)	Malta	29 May 2019	Games of the Small States of Europe	Podgorica, Montenegro	
4×100m medley relay	4:26.92		Mya Azzopardi (1:06.82); Amy Micallef (1:14.23); Leah Tanti (1:07.31); Francesca Falzon Young (58.56)	Malta	1 June 2017	Games of the Small States of Europe	Serravalle, San Marino	

Legend: # – Record awaiting ratification by ASA Malta; WR – World record; ER – European record; e – equalled existing record;
Records not set in finals: h – heat; sf – semifinal; r – relay 1st leg; rh – relay heat 1st leg; b – B final; † – en route to final mark; so – swim-off; tt – time trial

=== Mixed relay ===
Event	Time	Name	Club	Date	Meet	Location	Ref
4×100m freestyle relay	3:43.16	Andrew Chetcuti (51.36); Raoul Stafrace (52.76); Francesca Falzon Young (59.84); Nicola Muscat (59.20)	Malta	1 April 2016	Easter International Meet	Gżira, Malta	
4×100m medley relay	4:11.73	Francesca Falzon Young; Michael Starface; Andrew Chetcuti; Nicola Muscat	Malta	2 April 2016	Easter International Meet	Gżira, Malta	

Legend: # – Record awaiting ratification by ASA Malta; WR – World record; ER – European record; e – equalled existing record;
Records not set in finals: h – heat; sf – semifinal; r – relay 1st leg; rh – relay heat 1st leg; b – B final; † – en route to final mark; so – swim-off; tt – time trial

== Short Course (25 m) ==
=== Men ===
Event	Time		Name	Club	Date	Meet	Location	Ref
50m freestyle	22.26		Matthew Zammit	Plymouth Leander	22 October 2016	Manchester International Meet	Manchester, Great Britain	
100m freestyle	49.89		Matthew Zammit	Plymouth Leander	23 October 2016	Manchester International Meet	Manchester, Great Britain	
200m freestyle	1:51.36	h	Dylan Cachia	Malta	5 November 2021	European Championships	Kazan, Russia	
400m freestyle	3:57.26	h	Dylan Cachia	Malta	2 November 2021	European Championships	Kazan, Russia	
800m freestyle	8:11.85	h	Dylan Cachia	Malta	6 November 2021	European Championships	Kazan, Russia	
1500m freestyle	15:49.89		Dylan Cachia	Sliema ASC	21 December 2024	Maltese Championships	Cospicua, Malta	
50m backstroke	26.60	h	Neil Muscat	Malta	5 December 2014	World Championships	Doha, Qatar	
100m backstroke	57.16	h	Thomas Wareing	Malta	5 December 2019	European Championships	Glasgow, Great Britain	
200m backstroke	2:02.47	h	Thomas Wareing	Malta	4 December 2019	European Championships	Glasgow, Great Britain	
50m breaststroke	28.82	h	Julian Harding	Malta	6 December 2014	World Championships	Doha, Qatar	
100m breaststroke	1:03.38	h	Andrea Agius	Malta	15 December 2010	World Championships	Dubai, United Arab Emirates	
200m breaststroke	2:19.45	b	Andrea Mallia	Malta	23 October 2022	Slovak Cup	Šamorín, Slovakia	
50m butterfly	24.56	h, =	Andrew Chetcuti	Malta	14 December 2012	World Championships	Istanbul, Turkey	
50m butterfly	24.56	h, =	Michael Umnov	Malta	16 December 2017	European Championships	Copenhagen, Denmark	
100m butterfly	54.26	h	Michael Umnov	Malta	13 December 2017	European Championships	Copenhagen, Denmark	
200m butterfly	2:00.26		Nathan Cachia	Sliema ASC	7 November 2026	Swedish Games	Upplands Väsby, Sweden	
100m individual medley	57.23	h	Thomas Wareing	Malta	6 November 2021	European Championships	Kazan, Russia	
200m individual medley	2:02.75	h	Michael Umnov	Malta	15 December 2017	European Championships	Copenhagen, Denmark	
400m individual medley	4:20.56		Matthew Satariano	Sliema ASC	19 December 2025	Maltese Championships	Cospicua, Malta	
4×50m freestyle relay	1:35.31		Matthew Zammit; Raoul Stafrace; Matthew Galea; Neil Muscat	Malta	November 2014	-	Bolzano, Italy	
4×100m freestyle relay	3:30.91		Dylan Cachia (52.55); Matthew Satariano (53.49); Nathan Cachia (52.96); Sean Wareing (51.91)	Sliema ASC	21 December 2024	Maltese Championships	Cospicua, Malta	
4×200m freestyle relay	7:40.06		Nathan Cachia (1:55.07); Sean Wareing (1:54.62); Matthew Satariano (1:55.65); Dylan Cachia (1:54.72)	Sliema ASC	21 December 2024	Maltese Championships	Cospicua, Malta	
4×50m medley relay	1:42.78	h	Matthew Galea (27.01); Michael Stafrace (28.83); Michael Umnov (24.41); Matthew Zammit (22.53)	Malta	17 December 2017	European Championships	Copenhagen, Denmark	
4×100m medley relay	3:51.07	h	Mark Sammut (59.39); Andrea Agius (1:04.36); Neil Agius (57.22); Andrew Chetcuti (50.10)	Malta	19 December 2010	World Championships	Dubai, United Arab Emirates	

Legend: # – Record awaiting ratification by ASA Malta; WR – World record; ER – European record; e – equalled existing record;
Records not set in finals: h – heat; sf – semifinal; r – relay 1st leg; rh – relay heat 1st leg; b – B final; † – en route to final mark; so – swim-off; tt – time trial

=== Women ===
Event	Time		Name	Club	Date	Meet	Location	Ref
50m freestyle	26.03	h	Francesca Falzon Young	Malta	15 December 2018	World Championships	Hangzhou, China	
100m freestyle	56.20		Mya Azzopardi	Neptunes WPSC	20 December 2025	Maltese Championships	Cospicua, Malta	
200m freestyle	1:59.86		Sasha Gatt	Sliema ASC	8 December 2025	3nd Time Trial	Cospicua, Malta	
400m freestyle	4:10.92		Sasha Gatt	Sliema ASC	20 December 2025	Maltese Championships	Cospicua, Malta	
800m freestyle	8:31.85		Sasha Gatt	Sliema ASC	7 November 2026	Swedish Games	Upplands Väsby, Sweden	
1500m freestyle	16:14.93		Sasha Gatt	Sliema ASC	6 November 2026	Swedish Games	Upplands Väsby, Sweden	
50m backstroke	29.22	h	Francesca Falzon Young	Malta	16 December 2017	European Championships	Copenhagen, Denmark	
100m backstroke	1:04.56	h	Francesca Falzon Young	Malta	13 December 2017	European Championships	Copenhagen, Denmark	
200m backstroke	2:22.02		Julienne Woods	Neptunes WPSC	21 December 2025	Maltese Championships	Cospicua, Malta	
50m breaststroke	33.30		Alexandra McGonigle	Malta	28 October 2018	Opera Swim Classics	Wuppertal, Germany	
100m breaststroke	1:12.27	h	Amy Micallef	Sirens ASC	25 October 2019	Opera Swim Classics	Wuppertal, Germany	
200m breaststroke	2:35.64	h	Amy Micallef	Sirens ASC	25 October 2019	Opera Swim Classics	Wuppertal, Germany	
50m butterfly	27.71		Michela Portelli	Sirens ASC	13 July 2024	End of Season Meet	Cospicua, Malta	
100m butterfly	1:03.87		Michela Portelli	Malta	22 October 2023	Slovak Cup	Šamorín, Slovakia	
200m butterfly	2:20.36		Michela Portelli	Sirens ASC	13 July 2024	End of Season Meet	Cospicua, Malta	
100m individual medley	1:05.54		Mya Azzopardi	Malta	23 March 2021	Turkish Championships	Istanbul, Turkey	
200m individual medley	2:19.39		Mya Azzopardi	Tiro a Volo Nuoto	16 November 2019	-	Frosinone, Italy	
400m individual medley	4:57.75	h	Mya Azzopardi	Malta	23 March 2021	Turkish Championships	Istanbul, Turkey	
4×50m freestyle relay	1:55.26		Sophia Allen; Yulya Bonnici; Ema Cassar; Juleanne Woods	National Sports School Malta	13 May 2023	World School Swim Championships	London, United Kingdom	
4×100m freestyle relay	3:57.36	h	Nicola Muscat (58.28); Talisa Pace (58.68); Melinda Sue Micallef (59.73); Davina Mangion (1:00.67)	Malta	18 December 2010	World Championships	Dubai, United Arab Emirates	
4×200m freestyle relay	9:03.90	#	Julienne Woods (2:12.41); Madeleine Cassar (2:17.06); Michela Portelli (2:19.93); Mya Azzopardi (2:14.50)	Neptunes WPSC	19 December 2025	Maltese Championships	Cospicua, Malta	
4×50m medley relay	1:59.23		Madeleine Cassar (31.21); Julienne Woods (34.04); Michela Portelli (27.91); Mya Azzopardi (26.07)	Neptunes WPSC	21 December 2025	Maltese Championships	Cospicua, Malta	
4×100m medley relay	4:28.67	h	Nicola Muscat (1:06.12); Melinda Sue Micallef (1:15.28); Davina Mangion (1:07.88); Talisa Pace (59.39)	Malta	17 December 2010	World Championships	Dubai, United Arab Emirates	

Legend: # – Record awaiting ratification by ASA Malta; WR – World record; ER – European record; e – equalled existing record;
Records not set in finals: h – heat; sf – semifinal; r – relay 1st leg; rh – relay heat 1st leg; b – B final; † – en route to final mark; so – swim-off; tt – time trial

=== Mixed relay ===
Event	Time		Name	Club	Date	Meet	Location	Ref
4×50m freestyle relay	1:38.77	h	Matthew Zammit (22.76); Matthew Galea (22.81); Francesca Falzon Young (25.80); Mya Azzopardi (27.40)	Malta	16 December 2017	European Championships	Copenhagen, Denmark	
4×50m medley relay	1:51.00	h	Francesca Falzon Young (30.07); Michael Stafrace (28.76); Mya Azzopardi (29.12); Matt Galea (23.05)	Malta	13 December 2018	World Championships	Hangzhou, China	

Legend: # – Record awaiting ratification by ASA Malta; e – equalled existing record;
Records not set in finals: h – heat; so – swim-off
