= Syria at the 2023 World Aquatics Championships =

- Flag of Syria
- FINA code: SYR
- National federation: Syrian Arab Swimming and Aquatic Sports Federation

in Fukuoka, Japan
- Competitors: 2 in 1 sport
- Medals: Gold 0 Silver 0 Bronze 0 Total 0

World Aquatics Championships appearances
- 1973; 1975; 1978; 1982; 1986; 1991; 1994; 1998; 2001; 2003; 2005; 2007; 2009; 2011; 2013; 2015; 2017; 2019; 2022; 2023; 2024

Syria is set to compete at the 2023 World Aquatics Championships in Fukuoka, Japan from 14 to 30 July.

== Swimming ==
Syria entered 2 swimmers.

Men

Athlete	Event	Heat		Semifinal		Final	
Athlete	Event	Time	Rank	Time	Rank	Time	Rank
Omar Abbass	100 metre freestyle	51.24	60	Did not advance			
Omar Abbass	200 metre freestyle	1:52.11	42	Did not advance			
Osama Trabulsi	100 metre breaststroke	1:07.33	62	Did not advance			
Osama Trabulsi	100 metre butterfly	58.90	63	Did not advance			
