= Malta at the 2019 World Aquatics Championships =

- Flag of Malta
- FINA code: MLT
- National federation: Aquatic Sports Association of Malta
- Website: www.asaofmalta.org

in Gwangju, South Korea
- Medals: Gold 0 Silver 0 Bronze 0 Total 0

World Aquatics Championships appearances
- 1973; 1975; 1978; 1982; 1986; 1991; 1994; 1998; 2001; 2003; 2005; 2007; 2009; 2011; 2013; 2015; 2017; 2019; 2022; 2023; 2024

Malta competed at the 2019 World Aquatics Championships in Gwangju, South Korea from 12 to 28 July.

== Swimming ==
Malta entered four swimmers.

Men

Athlete	Event	Heat		Semifinal		Final	
Athlete	Event	Time	Rank	Time	Rank	Time	Rank
Andrew Chetcuti	50 m freestyle	23.17	56	did not advance			
Matt Galea	100 m freestyle	53.63	87	did not advance			
Matt Galea	200 m freestyle	1:58.57	62	did not advance			

Women

Athlete	Event	Heat		Semifinal		Final	
Athlete	Event	Time	Rank	Time	Rank	Time	Rank
Mya Azzopardi	100 m freestyle	59.37	55	did not advance			
Mya Azzopardi	200 m individual medley	2:25.24	32	did not advance			
Amy Micallef	100 m breaststroke	1:17.06	48	did not advance			
Amy Micallef	200 m breaststroke	2:44.30	30	did not advance			
