= Malta at the 2022 World Aquatics Championships =

- Flag of Malta
- FINA code: MLT
- National federation: Aquatic Sports Association of Malta

in Budapest, Hungary
- Competitors: 2 in 1 sport
- Medals: Gold 0 Silver 0 Bronze 0 Total 0

World Aquatics Championships appearances
- 1973; 1975; 1978; 1982; 1986; 1991; 1994; 1998; 2001; 2003; 2005; 2007; 2009; 2011; 2013; 2015; 2017; 2019; 2022; 2023; 2024

Malta competed at the 2022 World Aquatics Championships in Budapest, Hungary from 18 June to 3 July.

== Artistic swimming ==
Malta entered 2 artistic swimmers.

Women

Athlete	Event	Preliminaries		Final	
Athlete	Event	Points	Rank	Points	Rank
Ana Culic	Solo technical routine	67.8191	23	did not advance	
Ana Culic	Solo free routine	68.9000	24	did not advance	
Thea Blake; Ana Culic	Duet technical routine	64.5435	29	did not advance	
Thea Blake; Ana Culic	Duet free routine	65.2000	33	did not advance	
