= Swimming at the 2020 European Aquatics Championships – Women's 100 metre freestyle =

Women's 100 metre freestyle at the 2020 European Aquatics Championships
- Venue: Danube Arena
- Dates: 21 May 2021 (heats and semifinals); 22 May 2021 (final)
- Competitors: 69 from 33 nations
- Winning time: 53.05

Medalists
gold medal	Femke Heemskerk	Netherlands
silver medal	Marie Wattel	France
bronze medal	Anna Hopkin	Great Britain

The Women's 100 metre freestyle competition of the 2020 European Aquatics Championships was held on 21 and 22 May 2021.

== Records ==
Prior the competition, the existing world, European and championship records were as follows.

	Name	Nationality	Time	Location	Date
World record European record	Sarah Sjöström	Sweden	51.71	Budapest	23 July 2017
Championship record	Sarah Sjöström	Sweden	52.67	Berlin	20 August 2014

== Results ==
=== Heats ===
The heats were started on 21 May at 10:00.

Rank	Heat	Lane	Name	Nationality	Time	Notes
1	7	4	Femke Heemskerk	Netherlands	53.84	Q
2	8	5	Anna Hopkin	Great Britain	53.94	Q
3	6	4	Ranomi Kromowidjojo	Netherlands	54.04	Q
4	6	5	Marie Wattel	France	54.07	Q
5	8	6	Andrea Murez	Israel	54.19	Q, =NR
6	7	5	Freya Anderson	Great Britain	54.25	Q
7	7	2	Barbora Seemanová	Czech Republic	54.26	Q
8	6	3	Signe Bro	Denmark	54.31	Q
8	6	6	Katarzyna Wasick	Poland	54.31	Q
10	7	6	Lucy Hope	Great Britain	54.33	
11	8	4	Michelle Coleman	Sweden	54.41	Q
12	8	8	Neža Klančar	Slovenia	54.54	Q, NR
13	7	3	Maria Kameneva	Russia	54.60	Q, WD
14	8	2	Kim Busch	Netherlands	54.62	
15	6	2	Lidón Muñoz	Spain	54.67	Q
16	5	7	Fanny Teijonsalo	Finland	54.72	Q
17	6	0	Silvia Di Pietro	Italy	54.75	Q
18	5	4	Fanni Gyurinovics	Hungary	55.04	Q
19	7	7	Arina Surkova	Russia	55.19	Q
20	4	5	Janja Šegel	Slovenia	55.20	
21	8	1	Nina Kost	Switzerland	55.22	
22	8	0	Chiara Tarantino	Italy	55.24	
23	7	0	Valentine Dumont	Belgium	55.35	
24	6	1	Evelyn Davis	Great Britain	55.38	
25	6	7	Julie-Marie Weynen	Luxembourg	55.46	
26	5	6	Selen Özbilen	Turkey	55.49	
27	5	2	Petra Senánszky	Hungary	55.51	
28	5	3	Kornelia Fiedkiewicz	Poland	55.55	
29	7	8	Kalia Antoniou	Cyprus	55.56	
30	6	8	Julie Kepp Jensen	Denmark	55.66	
31	5	1	Nina Stanisavljević	Serbia	55.69	
32	4	4	Cornelia Pammer	Austria	55.74	
33	7	9	Costanza Cocconcelli	Italy	55.78	
34	3	8	Barbora Janickova	Czech Republic	55.80	
35	3	5	Aleksa Gold	Estonia	55.87	
35	4	2	Dominika Kossakowska	Poland	55.87	
37	5	0	Anna Kolářová	Czech Republic	55.90	
38	4	3	Tjaša Pintar	Slovenia	55.91	
39	5	9	Jessica Felsner	Germany	56.01	
40	7	1	Jessica Steiger	Germany	56.06	
41	5	8	Ieva Maļuka	Latvia	56.11	
42	8	7	Anastasiya Shkurdai	Belarus	56.18	
43	6	9	Julia Mrozinski	Germany	56.23	
44	3	2	Leoni Richter	Switzerland	56.24	
45	4	1	Nastassia Karakouskaya	Belarus	56.32	
46	3	3	Noémi Girardet	Switzerland	56.35	
47	4	8	Alma Thormalm	Sweden	56.38	
47	5	5	Emily Gantriis	Denmark	56.38	
49	3	4	Sara Junevik	Sweden	56.41	
50	3	7	İlknur Nihan Çakıcı	Turkey	56.47	
51	4	9	Tanja Popović	Serbia	56.60	
52	3	1	Snæfríður Jórunnardóttir	Iceland	56.63	
53	2	5	Martina Cibulková	Slovakia	56.88	
54	2	3	Teresa Ivanová	Slovakia	56.89	
55	2	2	Zora Ripková	Slovakia	57.06	
56	3	9	Gabriela Ņikitina	Latvia	57.09	
57	3	0	Sasha Touretski	Switzerland	57.28	
58	2	6	Jóhanna Guðmundsdóttir	Iceland	57.35	
59	2	4	Zohar Shikler	Israel	57.38	
60	2	7	Mia Blazevska Eminova	North Macedonia	57.85	
61	2	8	Mya Azzopardi	Malta	58.27	
62	1	2	Varsenik Manucharyan	Armenia	59.00	
63	2	0	Mónica Ramírez	Andorra	59.94	
64	1	4	Alina Vedehhova	Estonia	1:00.28	
65	2	9	Ani Poghosyan	Armenia	1:00.43	
66	1	7	Katie Rock	Albania	1:01.39	
67	1	5	Eda Zeqiri	Kosovo	1:01.69	
68	1	3	Era Budima	Kosovo	1:05.47	
69	1	6	Jona Macula	Kosovo	1:06.71	
	2	1	Lea Polonsky	Israel	Did not start	
	3	6	Daria Golovaty	Israel	Did not start	
	4	0	Panna Ugrai	Hungary	Did not start	
	4	6	Evelyn Verrasztó	Hungary	Did not start	
	4	7	Sophie Hansson	Sweden	Did not start	
	8	3	Federica Pellegrini	Italy	Did not start	

=== Semifinals ===
The semifinals were started on 21 May 2021 at 18:47.

==== Semifinal 1 ====
Rank	Lane	Name	Nationality	Time	Notes
1	5	Marie Wattel	France	53.34	Q
2	4	Anna Hopkin	Great Britain	53.74	Q
3	3	Freya Anderson	Great Britain	53.93	q
4	2	Michelle Coleman	Sweden	54.12	q
5	6	Katarzyna Wasick	Poland	54.47	
6	7	Lidón Muñoz	Spain	54.76	
7	8	Arina Surkova	Russia	54.86	
8	1	Silvia Di Pietro	Italy	54.87	

==== Semifinal 2 ====
Rank	Lane	Name	Nationality	Time	Notes
1	4	Femke Heemskerk	Netherlands	53.49	Q
2	5	Ranomi Kromowidjojo	Netherlands	53.59	Q
3	6	Barbora Seemanová	Czech Republic	53.68	q, NR
4	2	Signe Bro	Denmark	53.70	q
5	3	Andrea Murez	Israel	54.18	NR
6	7	Neža Klančar	Slovenia	54.47	NR
7	8	Fanni Gyurinovics	Hungary	55.04	
8	1	Fanny Teijonsalo	Finland	55.11	

=== Final ===
The final was held on 22 May 2021 at 18:12.

Rank	Lane	Name	Nationality	Time	Notes
1st place, gold medalist(s)	5	Femke Heemskerk	Netherlands	53.05	
2nd place, silver medalist(s)	4	Marie Wattel	France	53.32	
3rd place, bronze medalist(s)	7	Anna Hopkin	Great Britain	53.43	
4	3	Ranomi Kromowidjojo	Netherlands	53.44	
5	1	Freya Anderson	Great Britain	53.56	
6	2	Signe Bro	Denmark	53.69	
7	6	Barbora Seemanová	Czech Republic	53.74	
8	8	Michelle Coleman	Sweden	54.15	
