= Swimming at the 2020 European Aquatics Championships – Women's 200 metre freestyle =

Women's 200 metre freestyle at the 2020 European Aquatics Championships
- Venue: Danube Arena
- Dates: 19 May 2021 (heats and semifinals); 20 May 2021 (final)
- Competitors: 66 from 32 nations
- Winning time: 1:56.27

Medalists
gold medal	Barbora Seemanová	Czech Republic
silver medal	Federica Pellegrini	Italy
bronze medal	Freya Anderson	Great Britain

The Women's 200 metre freestyle competition of the 2020 European Aquatics Championships was held on 19 and 20 May 2021.

== Records ==
Prior to the competition, the existing world, European and championship records were as follows.

	Name	Nationality	Time	Location	Date
World record European record	Federica Pellegrini	Italy	1:52.98	Rome	29 July 2009
Championship record	Charlotte Bonnet	France	1:54.95	Glasgow	6 August 2018

== Results ==
=== Heats ===
The heats were started on 19 May at 10:43.

Rank	Heat	Lane	Name	Nationality	Time	Notes
1	7	5	Barbora Seemanová	Czech Republic	1:58.25	Q
2	5	4	Charlotte Bonnet	France	1:58.33	Q
3	7	4	Federica Pellegrini	Italy	1:58.48	Q
4	6	4	Freya Anderson	Great Britain	1:58.50	Q
5	7	3	Andrea Murez	Israel	1:58.84	Q
6	7	8	Janja Šegel	Slovenia	1:58.95	Q
7	6	6	Valentine Dumont	Belgium	1:59.09	Q
8	7	2	Katja Fain	Slovenia	1:59.27	Q
9	7	1	Tamryn van Selm	Great Britain	1:59.52	Q
10	6	5	Lucy Hope	Great Britain	1:59.67	
11	5	2	Stefania Pirozzi	Italy	1:59.87	Q
12	7	7	Laura Veres	Hungary	2:00.06	Q
13	7	0	Dominika Kossakowska	Poland	2:00.12	Q
14	5	1	Aleksandra Polańska	Poland	2:00.23	Q
15	7	6	Julia Mrozinski	Germany	2:00.30	Q
16	5	5	Reva Foos	Germany	2:00.44	Q
17	5	3	Holly Hibbott	Great Britain	2:00.52	
18	5	7	Fanni Fábián	Hungary	2:00.58	Q
19	6	2	Anastasia Gorbenko	Israel	2:00.62	
20	6	3	Ajna Késely	Hungary	2:00.66	
21	6	1	Evelyn Verrasztó	Hungary	2:00.69	
22	4	2	África Zamorano	Spain	2:00.81	
23	5	8	Maria Ugolkova	Switzerland	2:00.92	
24	6	0	Assia Touati	France	2:00.99	
25	5	6	Robin Neumann	Netherlands	2:01.01	
26	4	5	Silke Holkenborg	Netherlands	2:01.12	
27	4	6	Monique Olivier	Luxembourg	2:01.28	
28	5	9	Snæfríður Jórunnardóttir	Iceland	2:01.31	
29	5	0	Lotte Goris	Belgium	2:01.40	
30	2	2	Kalia Antoniou	Cyprus	2:01.94	
31	4	3	Aleksa Gold	Estonia	2:02.16	
32	4	1	Lea Polonsky	Israel	2:02.28	
33	4	4	Julia Hassler	Liechtenstein	2:02.31	
34	3	5	Daria Golovaty	Israel	2:02.39	
35	3	2	Lana Ravelingien	Belgium	2:02.45	
36	4	7	Cornelia Pammer	Austria	2:02.46	
37	3	9	Kimberly Buys	Belgium	2:02.49	
38	2	5	Selen Özbilen	Turkey	2:02.52	
39	3	4	Tanja Popović	Serbia	2:02.54	
40	6	9	Sara Gailli	Italy	2:02.55	
40	4	0	Noémi Girardet	Switzerland	2:02.55	
42	3	6	Tjaša Pintar	Slovenia	2:02.58	
43	4	8	Ieva Maļuka	Latvia	2:02.59	
44	3	7	Anastasiya Shkurdai	Belarus	2:02.68	
45	3	8	Martina Cibulková	Slovakia	2:02.70	
46	3	1	Lena Opatril	Austria	2:02.91	
47	2	6	Zora Ripková	Slovakia	2:03.18	
48	2	7	Paulina Nogaj	Poland	2:03.27	
49	4	9	Zoe Vogelmann	Germany	2:03.33	
50	2	1	Laura Benková	Slovakia	2:03.35	
51	7	9	Marta Klimek	Poland	2:03.52	
52	6	8	Beril Böcekler	Turkey	2:03.69	
53	2	3	Francisca Martins	Portugal	2:04.20	
54	6	7	Daryna Zevina	Ukraine	2:04.30	
55	3	0	Diana Durães	Portugal	2:04.41	
56	2	0	Mya Azzopardi	Malta	2:04.52	NR
57	2	8	Arina Baikova	Latvia	2:04.90	
58	3	3	Malene Rypestøl	Norway	2:05.14	
59	2	4	Rita Frischknecht	Portugal	2:06.20	
60	2	9	Fatima Alkaramova	Azerbaijan	2:09.60	
61	1	4	Ani Poghosyan	Armenia	2:10.20	
62	1	7	Varsenik Manucharyan	Armenia	2:11.71	
63	1	5	Eda Zeqiri	Kosovo	2:13.27	
64	1	6	Katie Rock	Albania	2:16.56	
65	1	3	Era Budima	Kosovo	2:18.20	
66	1	2	Jona Macula	Kosovo	2:24.20	

=== Semifinals ===
The semifinals were started on 19 May at 19:33.

==== Semifinal 1 ====
Rank	Lane	Name	Nationality	Time	Notes
1	4	Charlotte Bonnet	France	1:57.30	Q
2	5	Freya Anderson	Great Britain	1:57.71	Q
3	6	Katja Fain	Slovenia	1:58.16	q
4	1	Julia Mrozinski	Germany	1:59.21	q
5	3	Janja Šegel	Slovenia	1:59.31	
6	2	Stefania Pirozzi	Italy	1:59.57	
7	8	Fanni Fábián	Hungary	2:00.06	
8	7	Dominika Kossakowska	Poland	2:00.70	

==== Semifinal 2 ====
Rank	Lane	Name	Nationality	Time	Notes
1	4	Barbora Seemanová	Czech Republic	1:57.20	Q
2	5	Federica Pellegrini	Italy	1:57.47	Q
3	6	Valentine Dumont	Belgium	1:57.98	q, NR
4	3	Andrea Murez	Israel	1:58.81	q
5	7	Laura Veres	Hungary	1:59.50	
6	2	Tamryn van Selm	Great Britain	1:59.85	
7	8	Reva Foos	Germany	1:59.97	
8	1	Aleksandra Polańska	Poland	2:02.10	

=== Final ===
The final was held on 20 May at 19:02.

Rank	Lane	Name	Nationality	Time	Notes
1st place, gold medalist(s)	4	Barbora Seemanová	Czech Republic	1:56.27	NR
2nd place, silver medalist(s)	3	Federica Pellegrini	Italy	1:56.29	
3rd place, bronze medalist(s)	6	Freya Anderson	Great Britain	1:56.42	
4	5	Charlotte Bonnet	France	1:56.55	
5	1	Andrea Murez	Israel	1:58.48	
6	7	Katja Fain	Slovenia	1:58.76	
7	2	Valentine Dumont	Belgium	1:58.78	
8	8	Julia Mrozinski	Germany	1:59.36	
