= Malta at the 2013 World Aquatics Championships =

- Flag of Malta
- FINA code: MLT
- National federation: Aquatic Sports Association of Malta
- Website: www.asaofmalta.org

in Barcelona, Spain
- Competitors: 2 in 1 sports
- Medals Ranked -th: Gold 0 Silver 0 Bronze 0 Total 0

World Aquatics Championships appearances
- 1973; 1975; 1978; 1982; 1986; 1991; 1994; 1998; 2001; 2003; 2005; 2007; 2009; 2011; 2013; 2015; 2017; 2019; 2022; 2023; 2024

Malta competed at the 2013 World Aquatics Championships in Barcelona, Spain from 19 July to 4 August 2013.

== Swimming ==
Malta qualified 3 quota places for the following swimming events:

Men

Athlete	Event	Heat		Semifinal		Final	
Athlete	Event	Time	Rank	Time	Rank	Time	Rank
Matthew Zammit	50 m freestyle	24.11	56	did not advance			
Andrew Chetcuti	100 m freestyle	52.08	50	did not advance			
Andrew Chetcuti	50 m butterfly	24.88	42	did not advance			
