= Malta at the 2023 World Aquatics Championships =

- Flag of Malta
- FINA code: MLT
- National federation: Aquatic Sports Association of Malta
- Website: asaofmalta.eu

in Fukuoka, Japan
- Competitors: 5 in 2 sports
- Medals: Gold 0 Silver 0 Bronze 0 Total 0

World Aquatics Championships appearances
- 1973; 1975; 1978; 1982; 1986; 1991; 1994; 1998; 2001; 2003; 2005; 2007; 2009; 2011; 2013; 2015; 2017; 2019; 2022; 2023; 2024

Malta competed at the 2023 World Aquatics Championships in Fukuoka, Japan from 14 to 30 July.

== Artistic swimming ==
Malta entered 1 artistic swimmer.

Women

Athlete	Event	Preliminaries		Final	
Athlete	Event	Points	Rank	Points	Rank
Ana Culic	Solo technical routine	165.0033	22	Did not advance	
Ana Culic	Solo free routine	128.6814	20	Did not advance	

== Swimming ==
Malta entered 4 swimmers.

Men

Athlete	Event	Heat		Semifinal		Final	
Athlete	Event	Time	Rank	Time	Rank	Time	Rank
Dylan Cachia	100 metre freestyle	54.32	91	Did not advance			
Dylan Cachia	400 metre freestyle	4:16.27	52	—		Did not advance	
Thomas Wareing	200 metre backstroke	2:12.57	37	Did not advance			
Thomas Wareing	200 metre individual medley	2:13.80	45	Did not advance			

Women

Athlete	Event	Heat		Semifinal		Final	
Athlete	Event	Time	Rank	Time	Rank	Time	Rank
Mya Azzopardi	100 metre freestyle	59.27	42	Did not advance			
Mya Azzopardi	200 metre freestyle	2:11.59	54	Did not advance			
Sasha Gatt	400 metre freestyle	4:35.45	38	—		Did not advance	
Sasha Gatt	800 metre freestyle	9:08.63	33	—		Did not advance	
