= Malta at the 2024 World Aquatics Championships =

- Flag of Malta
- FINA code: MLT
- National federation: Aquatic Sports Association of Malta
- Website: asaofmalta.eu

in Doha, Qatar
- Competitors: 3 in 1 sport
- Medals: Gold 0 Silver 0 Bronze 0 Total 0

World Aquatics Championships appearances
- 1973; 1975; 1978; 1982; 1986; 1991; 1994; 1998; 2001; 2003; 2005; 2007; 2009; 2011; 2013; 2015; 2017; 2019; 2022; 2023; 2024

Malta competed at the 2024 World Aquatics Championships in Doha, Qatar from 2 to 18 February.

== Competitors ==
The following is the list of competitors in the Championships.

Sport	Men	Women	Total
Artistic swimming	0	3	3
Total	0	3	3

== Artistic swimming ==
Women

Athlete	Event	Preliminaries		Final	
Athlete	Event	Points	Rank	Points	Rank
Ana Culic	Solo technical routine	189.7283	19	Did not advance	
Ana Culic	Solo free routine	167.4229	19	Did not advance	
Thea Grima Buttigieg; Emily Ruggier	Duet technical routine	176.1333	35	Did not advance	
Thea Grima Buttigieg; Emily Ruggier	Duet free routine	158.6000	22	Did not advance	
