= Mariam Imnadze =

Georgian swimmer (born 2001)

Personal information
- Born: 5 March 2001 (age 25)

Sport
- Sport: Swimming

Mariam Imnadze (born 5 March 2001) is a Georgian swimmer.

In 2018, she competed in the women's 50 metre freestyle and women's 100 metre freestyle events at the 2018 FINA World Swimming Championships (25 m) held in Hangzhou, China. In both events she did not advance to compete in the semi-finals.

In 2019, she represented Georgia at the 2019 World Aquatics Championships held in Gwangju, South Korea. She competed in the women's 50 metre freestyle and women's 100 metre freestyle events. In both events she did not advance to compete in the semi-finals.
