= Swimming at the 2014 Asian Games – Women's 200 metre freestyle =

Women's 200 metre freestyle at the 2014 Asian Games
- Venue: Munhak Park Tae-hwan Aquatics Center
- Date: 24 September 2014
- Competitors: 18 from 12 nations

Medalists
gold medal	Shen Duo	China
silver medal	Chihiro Igarashi	Japan
bronze medal	Tang Yi	China

The women's 200 metre freestyle event at the 2014 Asian Games took place on 24 September 2014 at Munhak Park Tae-hwan Aquatics Center.

== Schedule ==
All times are Korea Standard Time (UTC+09:00)

Date	Time	Event
Wednesday, 24 September 2014	09:00	Heats
Wednesday, 24 September 2014	19:06	Final

== Records ==
Prior to this competition, the existing world, Asian and Games records were as follows.

World Record	Federica Pellegrini (ITA)	1:52.98	Rome, Italy	29 July 2009
Asian Record	Pang Jiaying (CHN)	1:55.05	Beijing, China	13 August 2008
Games Record	Zhu Qianwei (CHN)	1:56.65	Guangzhou, China	13 November 2010

== Results ==
=== Heats ===
Rank	Heat	Athlete	Time	Notes
1	1	Chihiro Igarashi (JPN)	2:00.48	
2	3	Shen Duo (CHN)	2:01.17	
3	1	Yasuko Miyamoto (JPN)	2:01.36	
4	2	Tang Yi (CHN)	2:01.43	
5	2	Siobhán Haughey (HKG)	2:01.47	
6	2	Kim Jung-hye (KOR)	2:01.93	
7	3	Camille Cheng (HKG)	2:02.33	
8	3	Natthanan Junkrajang (THA)	2:02.71	
9	3	Jasmine Al-Khaldi (PHI)	2:02.84	
10	1	Yang Chin-kuei (TPE)	2:03.12	
11	1	Amanda Lim (SIN)	2:03.89	
12	2	Ranohon Amanova (UZB)	2:04.43	
13	3	Benjaporn Sriphanomthorn (THA)	2:04.78	
14	2	Lynette Lim (SIN)	2:05.05	
15	3	Bayan Jumah (SYR)	2:05.94	
16	1	Yang Ming-hsuan (TPE)	2:06.67	
17	2	Gabriella Doueihy (LIB)	2:17.57	
18	1	Aminath Shajan (MDV)	2:28.64	

=== Final ===
Rank	Athlete	Time	Notes
1st place, gold medalist(s)	Shen Duo (CHN)	1:57.66	
2nd place, silver medalist(s)	Chihiro Igarashi (JPN)	1:59.13	
3rd place, bronze medalist(s)	Tang Yi (CHN)	1:59.34	
4	Siobhán Haughey (HKG)	1:59.66	
5	Yasuko Miyamoto (JPN)	2:00.39	
6	Natthanan Junkrajang (THA)	2:02.05	
7	Camille Cheng (HKG)	2:02.06	
8	Kim Jung-hye (KOR)	2:03.54	
