= Fanni Fábián =

Hungarian swimmer (born 2002)

Personal information
- Nationality: Hungarian
- Born: 30 October 2002 (age 23)

Sport
- Sport: Swimming
Medal record
European Championships (LC)
Silver medal – second place	2020 Budapest	4×200 m freestyle

Fanni Fábián (born 30 October 2002) is a Hungarian swimmer. She competed in the women's 200 metre freestyle event at the 2020 European Aquatics Championships, in Budapest, Hungary.

== Personal life ==
Her sister, Bettina Fábián, is an Olympic swimmer.
