= Hayato Watanabe =

Japanese swimmer (born 1993)

Personal information
- Nationality: Japanese
- Born: 12 July 1993 (age 32)

Sport
- Sport: Swimming
- Strokes: breaststroke

Hayato Watanabe (born 12 July 1993) is a Japanese swimmer. He competed in the men's 100 metre breaststroke event at the 2018 FINA World Swimming Championships (25 m), in Hangzhou, China.
