= Mya Azzopardi =

Maltese swimmer (born 2002)

Personal information
- Nationality: Maltese
- Born: 29 September 2002 (age 23) Sliema, Malta
- Height: 5'5 (1.67m)

Sport
- Sport: Swimming
Medal record
Women's swimming
Representing Malta
Games of the Small States of Europe
Silver medal – second place	2023 Malta	4 × 200 m freestyle relay
Bronze medal – third place	2019 Podgorica	200 m individual medley
Bronze medal – third place	2019 Podgorica	4 × 100 m freestyle relay
Bronze medal – third place	2019 Podgorica	4 × 200 m freestyle relay
Bronze medal – third place	2023 Malta	4 × 100 m freestyle relay

Mya Azzopardi (born 29 September 2002) is a Maltese swimmer. She competed at the 2019 and 2023 World Aquatics Championships. She won three bronze medals at the 2019 Games of the Small States of Europe held in Budva, Montenegro.

== Career ==
Azzopardi broke her own national record in the 200 metre individual medley at the 2018 International Ströck ATUS Graz Trophy. Then at the 2018 World Short-Course Championships, she finished 42nd in the 200 metre freestyle, 32nd in the 200 metre individual medley, and 27th with the Maltese mixed 4 × 50 metre medley relay team.

At the 2019 Games of the Small States of Europe, Azzopardi won bronze medals in the 200 metre individual medley with a new national record, the 4 × 100 metre freestyle relay, and the 4 × 200 metre freestyle relay. She then represented Malta at the 2019 World Aquatics Championships in the 100 metre freestyle and 200 metre individual medley, finishing 55th and 32nd, respectively.

Azzopardi competed at the 2020 European Championships and finished 56th in the 200 metre freestyle with a new national record, 61st in the 100 metre freestyle, and 36th in the 200 metre individual medley. At the 2021 International Turkcell Open, she broke the national record in the 200 metre freestyle in the heats and broke it again in the finals.

Azzopardi joined San Jose State University's swimming team in 2022. At the 2023 Games of the Small States of Europe, she helped the Maltese 4 × 200 metre freestyle relay team break the national record and win the silver medal. She then helped the 4 × 100 metre freestyle relay team also break the national record and win a bronze medal. She then represented Malta at the 2023 World Aquatics Championships and finished 42nd and 54th in the 100 and 200 metre freestyle events, respectively.
