= Odrina Kaze =

Burundian swimmer (born 2000)

Personal information
- Born: 11 August 2000 (age 25)

Sport
- Sport: Swimming

Odrina Kaze (born 11 August 2000) is a Burundian swimmer.

In 2018, she competed in the women's 50 metre freestyle and women's 100 metre freestyle events at the 2018 FINA World Swimming Championships (25 m) held in Hangzhou, China. In both events she did not advance to compete in the semi-finals.

She represented Burundi at the 2019 World Aquatics Championships held in Gwangju, South Korea. She competed in the women's 50 metre freestyle event. She did not advance to compete in the semi-finals. She also competed in the women's 50 metre breaststroke event. In the same year, she also represented Burundi at the 2019 African Games held in Rabat, Morocco.

In 2021, she competed in the women's 50 metre freestyle event at the 2020 Summer Olympics held in Tokyo, Japan.
