= Tonia Papapetrou =

Cypriot swimmer (born 2000)

Personal information
- Nationality: Cypriot
- Born: 8 December 2000 (age 25)

Sport
- Sport: Swimming
Medal record
Women's swimming
Representing Cyprus
Games of the Small States of Europe
2019 Budva	4 × 100m freestyle relay

Tonia Papapetrou (born 8 December 2000) is a Cypriot swimmer. She competed in the women's 100 metre freestyle event at the 2018 FINA World Swimming Championships (25 m), in Hangzhou, China. In 2019, she won the silver medal in the women's 4 × 100 metre freestyle relay event at the 2019 Games of the Small States of Europe held in Budva, Montenegro.
