= Julia Mrozinski =

German swimmer (born 2000)

Personal information
- Nationality: German
- Born: 16 February 2000 (age 26)

Sport
- Sport: Swimming
Medal record
Representing Germany
European Games
Gold medal – first place	2015 Baku	200 m butterfly

Julia Mrozinski (born 16 February 2000) is a German swimmer. She competed in the women's 200 metre freestyle event at the 2020 European Aquatics Championships, in Budapest, Hungary.
