= Ties Elzerman =

Dutch swimmer

Personal information
- Nationality: Dutch
- Born: 30 April 1995 (age 31)

Sport
- Sport: Swimming
Medal record
Men's swimming
Representing the Netherlands
World Championships (SC)
Silver medal – second place	2018 Hangzhou	4×50 m mixed medley

Ties Elzerman (born 30 April 1995) is a Dutch swimmer. He competed in the men's 50 metre breaststroke at the 2019 World Aquatics Championships.
