= Thibaut Capitaine =

French swimmer

Personal information
- Nationality: French
- Born: 26 April 1993 (age 33)

Sport
- Sport: Swimming

Thibaut Capitaine (born 26 April 1993) is a French swimmer. He competed in the men's 50 metre breaststroke event at the 2018 FINA World Swimming Championships (25 m), in Hangzhou, China.
