= 2018 FINA World Swimming Championships (25 m) – Women's 200 metre individual medley =

Women's 200 metre individual medley at the 2018 FINA World Swimming Championships (25 m)
- Venue: Hangzhou Sports Park Stadium
- Dates: 15 December (heats and final)
- Competitors: 38 from 31 nations
- Winning time: 2:03.25

Medalists
gold medal	Katinka Hosszú	Hungary
silver medal	Melanie Margalis	United States
bronze medal	Kathleen Baker	United States

The Women's 200 metre individual medley competition of the 2018 FINA World Swimming Championships (25 m) was held on 15 December 2018.

== Records ==
Prior to the competition, the existing world and championship records were as follows.

	Name	Nation	Time	Location	Date
World record Championship record	Katinka Hosszú	Hungary	2:01.86	Doha	6 December 2014

== Results ==
=== Heats ===
The heats were started on 15 December at 9:36.

Rank	Heat	Lane	Name	Nationality	Time	Notes
1	4	4	Katinka Hosszú	Hungary	2:05.42	Q
2	4	5	Ye Shiwen	China	2:06.45	Q
3	2	3	Kathleen Baker	United States	2:06.57	Q
4	3	3	Ilaria Cusinato	Italy	2:07.11	Q
5	3	4	Melanie Margalis	United States	2:07.39	Q
6	4	6	Abbey Harkin	Australia	2:07.45	Q
7	3	6	Sakiko Shimizu	Japan	2:07.75	Q
8	2	4	Emily Seebohm	Australia	2:07.78	Q
9	4	3	Rika Omoto	Japan	2:07.94	
10	3	5	Fantine Lesaffre	France	2:08.27	
11	2	5	Zhou Min	China	2:09.17	
12	2	6	Catalina Corro	Spain	2:09.82	
13	4	2	Kristyna Horska	Czech Republic	2:10.36	
14	2	2	Barbora Závadová	Czech Republic	2:10.78	
15	4	9	Marie Pietruschka	Germany	2:10.97	
16	3	2	Irina Krivonogova	Russia	2:11.51	
17	4	8	Florencia Perotti	Argentina	2:11.83	
18	4	7	Anastasiia Sorokina	Russia	2:12.79	
19	4	1	Victoria Kaminskaya	Portugal	2:12.82	
20	2	9	McKenna DeBever	Peru	2:13.46	
21	1	4	Aela Janvier	Canada	2:13.80	
22	2	1	Rebecca Meder	South Africa	2:14.68	
23	4	0	Claudia Hufnagl	Austria	2:14.92	
24	2	0	Kan Cheuk Tung Natalie	Hong Kong	2:15.10	
25	3	7	Viktoria Zeynep Gunes	Turkey	2:15.11	
26	3	0	G.P. McCarthy	New Zealand	2:15.40	
27	3	8	Lisa Mamie	Switzerland	2:15.79	
28	3	1	Diana Duraes	Portugal	2:16.26	
29	3	9	Sabina Kupcova	Slovakia	2:16.38	
30	2	8	Margaret Markvardt	Estonia	2:16.91	
31	1	5	Wang Wan-Chen	Chinese Taipei	2:20.32	
32	1	2	Mya Azzopardi	Malta	2:22.09	
33	1	7	Elisa Funes	El Salvador	2:23.13	
34	1	6	Sara Pastrana	Honduras	2:25.06	
35	1	3	Gabriella Doueihy	Lebanon	2:27.86	
36	1	1	Inana Suleiman	Syria	2:28.21	
37	1	0	Kaya Forson	Ghana	2:31.46	
38	1	8	Thimali Bandara	Sri Lanka	2:33.28	
	2	7	Marina Garcia	Spain		DNS

=== Final ===
The final was held on 15 December at 19:07.

Rank	Lane	Name	Nationality	Time	Notes
1st place, gold medalist(s)	4	Katinka Hosszú	Hungary	2:03.25	
2nd place, silver medalist(s)	3	Melanie Margalis	United States	2:04.62	
3rd place, bronze medalist(s)	6	Kathleen Baker	United States	2:05.54	
4	1	Ye Shiwen	China	2:05.79	
5	5	Ilaria Cusinato	Italy	2:06.17	
6	5	Emily Seebohm	Australia	2:06.80	
7	7	Abbey Harkin	Australia	2:08.30	
8	8	Sakiko Shimizu	Japan	2:08.41	
