= Lidwine Umuhoza Uwase =

Rwandan swimmer

Personal information
- Born: 13 June 1999 (age 27) Rwanda

Sport
- Sport: Swimming

Lidwine Umuhoza Uwase (born 13 June 1999) is a Rwandan competitive swimmer. She represented Rwanda in the 2024 Summer Olympics, getting a result of 70th with a time of 32.03 in the Women's 50 meter Freestyle. She received two national records in the women's 100 meter freestyle and the women's 50 meter breaststroke both during the 2024 African Swimming Championships.
