= Ko Miso =

South Korean swimmer

Ko Miso 고미소
Personal information
- Nationality: South Korean
- Born: 4 September 1997 (age 28)

Sport
- Sport: Swimming

Ko Miso (born 4 September 1997) is a South Korean swimmer. She competed in the women's 50 metre freestyle event at the 2018 FINA World Swimming Championships (25 m), in Hangzhou, China.
