= Barbora Mikuskova =

Slovak swimmer

Personal information
- Nationality: Slovak
- Born: 19 January 2001 (age 25)

Sport
- Sport: Swimming

Barbora Mikuskova (born 19 January 2001) is a Slovak swimmer. She competed in the women's 50 metre freestyle event at the 2018 FINA World Swimming Championships (25 m), in Hangzhou, China.
