= Souhaib Kalala =

Syrian swimmer

Personal information
- National team: Syria
- Born: 1 January 1991 (age 35) Damascus, Syria
- Height: 1.70 m (5 ft 7 in)
- Weight: 65 kg (143 lb)

Sport
- Sport: Swimming
- Strokes: Backstroke

Souhaib Kalala (Arabic: صهيب كلالا; born January 1, 1991) is a Syrian swimmer, who specialized in backstroke events. He represented his nation Syria at the 2008 Summer Olympics, rounding out the field of 45 swimmers in the men's 100 m backstroke.

Kalala was invited by FINA to compete for Syria in the men's 100 m backstroke at the 2008 Summer Olympics in Beijing. Swimming on the outside in heat one, Kalala maintained his pace from start to finish to deny Bangladeshi swimmer Rubel Rana a fourth spot in his lifetime best of 1:00.24. Kalala failed to advance to the semifinals, as he sealed the penultimate position from a roster of forty-five swimmers in the prelims.
