= Michael Stafrace =

Maltese swimmer

Personal information
- Nationality: Maltese
- Born: 4 October 1998 (age 27)

Sport
- Sport: Swimming

Michael Stafrace (born 4 October 1998) is a Maltese swimmer. He competed in the men's 100 metre breaststroke event at the 2018 FINA World Swimming Championships (25 m), in Hangzhou, China.
