= Francesca Falzon Young =

Maltese swimmer

Personal information
- Nationality: Maltese
- Born: 3 February 2001 (age 25)

Sport
- Sport: Swimming

Francesca Falzon Young (born 3 February 2001) is a Maltese swimmer. She competed in the women's 100 metre freestyle event at the 2018 FINA World Swimming Championships (25 m), in Hangzhou, China.
