= Amy Micallef =

Maltese swimmer

Personal information
- Born: 3 February 1998 (age 28)

Sport
- Sport: Swimming

Amy Micallef (born 3 February 1998) is a Maltese swimmer. She competed in the women's 100 metre breaststroke event at the 2017 World Aquatics Championships.
