= Azad Al-Barazi =

American-Syrian swimmer (born 1988)

Personal information
- Full name: Azad Al-Barazi
- Nationality: Syria United States
- Born: 4 January 1988 (age 38) Riyadh, Saudi Arabia
- Height: 2.05 m (6 ft 8 1/2 in)
- Weight: 110 kg (243 lb)

Sport
- Sport: Swimming
- Strokes: Breaststroke
- Club: Trojan Swim Club (USA)
- College team: University of Hawaiʻi at Mānoa (USA)
- Coach: Dave Salo (USA)
Medal record
Men's swimming
Representing Syria
Islamic Solidarity Games
Bronze medal – third place	2017 Baku	50 m breaststroke
Bronze medal – third place	2017 Baku	100 m breaststroke
Bronze medal – third place	2017 Baku	200 m breaststroke

Azad Al-Barazi (Arabic: آزاد البرازي; born January 4, 1988) is an American-Syrian swimmer, who specialized in breaststroke events. The grandson of Syrian Prime Minister Muhsin al-Barazi’s cousin, Al-Barazi holds a dual citizenship between his parents' nation Syria and the United States, where he resides.

== Biography ==
He was invited to apply for the Syrian citizenship, after he was seen swimming laps in a public pool in 2010. Following he represented Syria in several swimming events such as two Olympic Games in 2012 and 2016. His main goal is to give hope for the people in Syria who are having a difficult time during the Syrian Civil War. In the 2012 Summer Olympics in London, Al-Barazi qualified for the men's 100 m breaststroke, as a member of the Syrian team. He received a universality place by posting a personal best of 1:00.35 from the AT&T Winter National Championships in Atlanta, Georgia. He challenged seven other swimmers on the second heat, including four-time Olympians Malick Fall of Senegal and Jakob Jóhann Sveinsson of Iceland. He touched out European junior champion Dănilă Artiomov of Moldova to take a seventh spot by 0.09 of a second in 1:00.48. Al-Barazi failed to advance into the semifinals, as he placed twenty-first overall on the first day of preliminaries. He competed at several other swimming competitions like the 2014 Short Track World Championships in Doha, Qatar, the 2015 World Aquatics Championships in Kazan, Russia and the Arab Games in Dubai, UAE in April 2016. His attendance at the Olympic Games in Rio de Janeiro, shortly caused some concern as the Brazilian authorities didn't believe he was professional swimmer.

Al-Barazi has also been a Los Angeles County Lifeguard since 2007 and has competed in several international lifeguard competitions for the United States. He attended the University of Hawaiʻi at Mānoa, and earned a bachelor's degree in kinesiology and a minor in sports nutrition. Al-Barazi later became a varsity swimmer for the Hawaii Rainbow Warriors, before he graduated with honors in 2010.

Al-Barazi is a full-time member of the Trojans Swim Club at the University of Southern California in Los Angeles, under his personal coach Dave Salo.
