= Syria at the 2011 World Aquatics Championships =

Sporting event delegation

Flag of Syria

Syria competed at the 2011 World Aquatics Championships in Shanghai, China between July 16 and 31, 2011.

== Open water swimming ==
Men

Athlete	Event	Final	
Athlete	Event	Time	Position
Saleh Mohamed	Men's 10km	1:55:47.6	29

== Swimming ==
Syria qualified 3 swimmers.

Men

Athlete	Event	Heats		Semifinals		Final	
Athlete	Event	Time	Rank	Time	Rank	Time	Rank
Azad Al-Barazi	Men's 100m Breaststroke	1:04.23	60	did not advance			
Azad Al-Barazi	Men's 200m Breaststroke	2:19.71	42	did not advance			
Rami Anis	Men's 50m Butterfly	26.22	41	did not advance			
Rami Anis	Men's 100m Butterfly	56.47	46	did not advance			

Women

Athlete	Event	Heats		Semifinals		Final	
Athlete	Event	Time	Rank	Time	Rank	Time	Rank
Bayan Jumah	Women's 100m Freestyle	59.22	47	did not advance			
Bayan Jumah	Women's 200m Freestyle	2:09.08	41	did not advance			
