= Ayman Klzie =

Syrian swimmer (born 1993)

Personal information
- Born: 7 January 1993 (age 33) Aleppo, Syria

Sport
- Sport: Swimming
Medal record
Men's swimming
Representing Syria
FINA Swimming World Cup
Bronze medal – third place	2015 Dubai	4x50 medley relay mixed
Arab Championships (SC)
Silver medal – second place	2021 Abu Dhabi	50 m butterfly
Islamic Solidarity Games
Bronze medal – third place	2013 Palembang	400 m medley

Ayman Klzie, sometimes written as Ayman Kelzi (Arabic: ايمن كلزية; born 7 January 1993 in Aleppo) is a Syrian swimmer. He represented Syria at the World Aquatics Championships in 2013, 2015, 2017, 2019 and 2022. He also competed at the 2020 Summer Olympics in 200 m butterfly event.

== Career ==
In 2018, he competed in the men's 100 metre butterfly event at the 2018 FINA World Swimming Championships (25 m) held in Hangzhou, China. He also competed in the men's 200 metre butterfly event.

In 2019, he Syria at the represented Syria at the World Aquatics Championships in Gwangju, South Korea. He competed in the men's 100 metre butterfly and men's 200 metre butterfly events and in both events he did not advance to compete in the semi-finals. He also took part in the 2022 World Championships, where he competed in the 50m butterfly event.
