= Syria at the 2007 World Aquatics Championships =

Sporting event delegation

Syria at the 2007 World Aquatics Championships details the achievements of Syrian athletes at the 2007 World Aquatics Championships in Melbourne, Australia.

Men

Athlete	Event	Heat		Semifinal		Final	
Athlete	Event	Time	Rank	Time	Rank	Time	Rank
Souhaib Kalala	100 m backstroke	1.01.66	63	did not advance			
Souhaib Kalala	200 m individual medley	DNS		did not advance			
Naeem El-Masri	400 m freestyle	DNS		did not advance			
