= Syria at the 2009 World Aquatics Championships =

Sporting event delegation

== Open water swimming ==
Syria qualified one quota place for the following event in open water swimming.

Athlete	Event	Time	Rank
Saleh Mohammad	Men's 25 km	5:49:30.06	17

== Swimming ==
Women

Athlete	Event	Heat		Semifinal		Final	
Athlete	Event	Time	Rank	Time	Rank	Time	Rank
Bayan Jumah	50 m freestyle	28.04	97	did not advance			
Bayan Jumah	100 m freestyle	1.00.47	95	did not advance			
