= Malta at the 2011 World Aquatics Championships =

Sporting event delegation

Flag of Malta

Malta competed at the 2011 World Aquatics Championships in Shanghai, China between July 16 and 31, 2011.

== Swimming ==
Malta qualified 3 swimmers.

Men

Athlete	Event	Heats		Semifinals		Final	
Athlete	Event	Time	Rank	Time	Rank	Time	Rank
Andrew Chetcuti	Men's 50m Freestyle	23.65	43	did not advance			
Andrew Chetcuti	Men's 50m Butterfly	25.54	37	did not advance			
Andrea Agius	Men's 50m Breaststroke	30.47	39	did not advance			
Andrea Agius	Men's 100m Breaststroke	1:06.13	68	did not advance			

Women

Athlete	Event	Heats		Semifinals		Final	
Athlete	Event	Time	Rank	Time	Rank	Time	Rank
Nicola Muscat	Women's 50m Freestyle	27.56	45	did not advance			
Nicola Muscat	Women's 50m Backstroke	32.62	49	did not advance			
