= Bayan Jumah =

Syrian swimmer

Bayan Jumah OLY
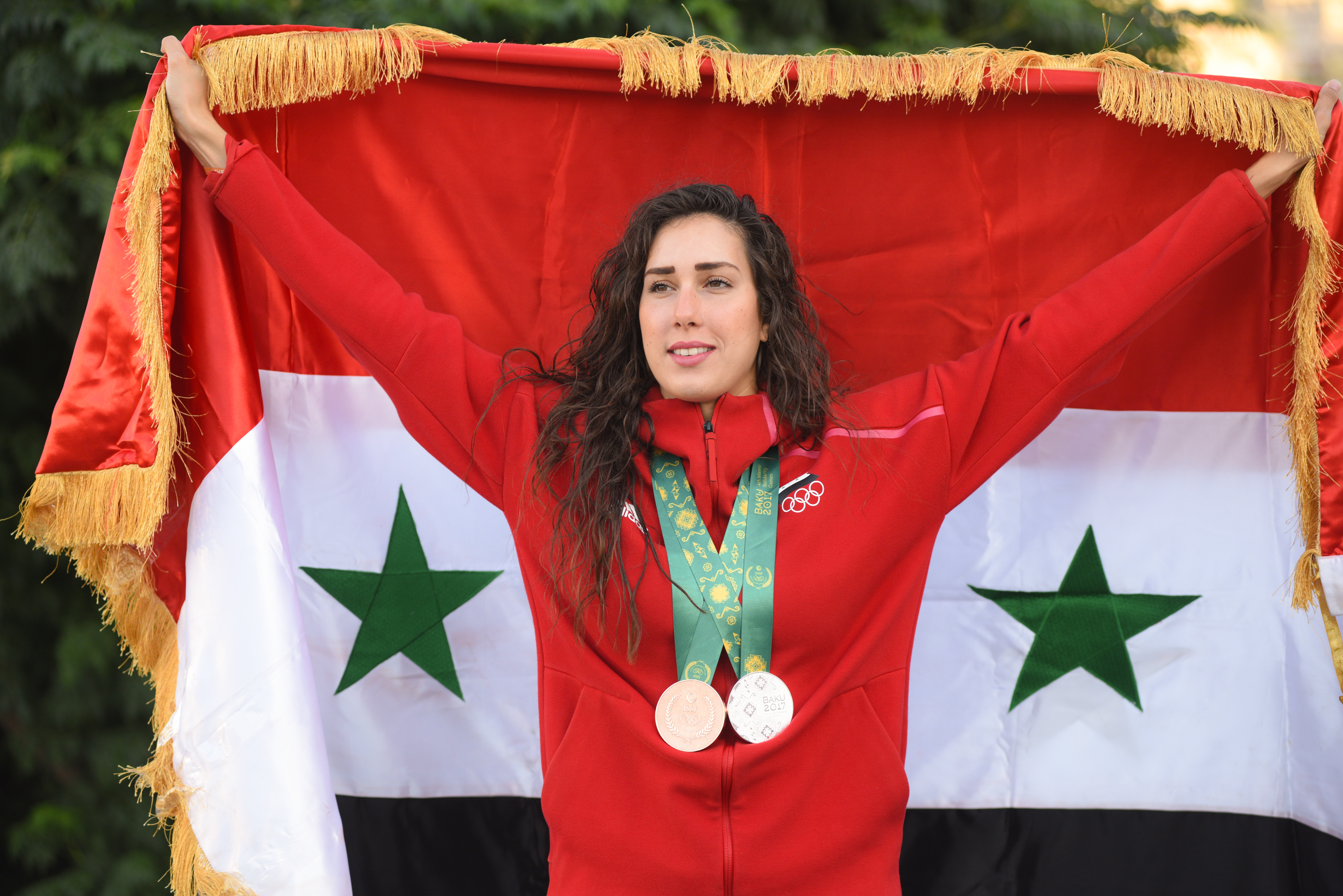
- Bayan Jumah in 2017

Personal information
- National team: Syria
- Born: April 13, 1994 (age 32) Aleppo, Syria
- Height: 1.80 m (5 ft 11 in)
- Weight: 69 kg (152 lb)

Sport
- Sport: Swimming
- Strokes: Freestyle, breaststroke
Medal record
Women's swimming
Representing Syria
FINA Swimming World Cup
Bronze medal – third place	2015 Dubai	4x50 medley relay mixed
Islamic Solidarity Games
Silver medal – second place	2017 Baku	100 m freestyle
Bronze medal – third place	2013 Palembang	200 m freestyle
Bronze medal – third place	2017 Baku	50 m breaststroke

Bayan Jumah (Arabic: بيان جمعة, born April 13, 1994) is a Syrian swimmer from Aleppo who specializes in butterfly and freestyle events. An ISG silver medalist and Syrian national champion and record-holder. Jumah was the second Syrian female swimmer to compete at the Olympic Games, following Marella Mamoun in 2000.

== Career ==
In 2007, Jumah was picked for the national team, in which she managed to break three national records in the 50m, 100m and 200m freestyle events. At the 2008 Summer Olympics, she withdrew from a heat in the 50 metre freestyle in which she would have faced Olympian Anya Gostomelsky, refusing to swim alongside an Israeli. Gostomelsky set a new Israeli national record in the race. Asked what her reaction was, Gostomelsky said: "I didn't notice that the lane was empty. That's her problem." In 2009, she won her first international medal at the Arab Games in Jordan.

At the 2012 Summer Olympics, she competed in the Women's 100 metre freestyle, finishing in 40th place overall out of 48 swimmers in the first round heats, failing to qualify for the second round. In 2013, she broke several national records in swimming, including the 100m and 200m freestyle and the 100 m breaststroke events, at the Asian Indoor and Martial Arts Games.

She also competed at the 2016 Summer Olympics in the Women's 50 m freestyle and finished 49th with a time of 26.41 seconds. In 2019, she finished 7th in the 50m freestyle event at the Asian Age Group Championships in Bengaluru, India; hence, she did not qualify to the 2020 Summer Olympics in Tokyo.

== See also ==
- Boycotts of Israel in individual sports
- List of Syrian records in swimming
