= Aquatic Sports Association of Malta =

Governing body of water sports in Malta

LEN
- Association crest
- Founded: 1925
- FINA affiliation: xxxx
- LEN affiliation: xxxx
- President: Karl Izzo

The Aquatic Sports Association of Malta is the governing body of artistic swimming, swimming, and water polo in Malta. It is affiliated with both LEN and FINA as well as COMEN. The President of the Association is Karl Izzo, while the General Secretary is George Farrugia. Its headquarters are located at the Tal-Qroqq Sports Complex, which houses the National Pool Complex, in Tal-Qroqq, Gzira. The Association receives sponsorship from Meridianbet, which includes the establishment of a branded national cup competition known as the Meridianbet Super Cup.

== History ==
Founded in 1925 as the Amateur Swimming Association of Malta, the ASA initially aimed to enable Maltese water polo participation at the Olympics, inspired by the ambitions of then‑Governor Lord Plumer. Malta competed in Berlin 1936, marking an early international milestone for water polo and athletics. Following its establishment, the ASA joined prominent international bodies such as FINA and LEN, thus expanding opportunities for Maltese swimmers and water polo players to compete globally. In 2000, the organization officially became the Aquatic Sports Association of Malta to better reflect its wider remit across swimming, water polo, artistic and open-water disciplines. A major milestone occurred in 1993, when Malta hosted the Games of the Small States of Europe and inaugurated the Tal‑Qroqq Olympic‑standard pool complex, anchoring the sport's domestic infrastructure. Today, the ASA remains the national authority for aquatic sports in Malta—overseeing swimming, water polo, artistic swimming, open‑water disciplines, organizing national championships and international meets.

== Competitions ==
Swimming

- National long and short course championships

Water Polo

- Enemed Cup
- Summer League
- Winter League
- Women League
- Age Group Competitions
