= Cyprus at the 2025 World Aquatics Championships =

- Flag of Cyprus
- World Aquatics code: CYP
- National federation: Cyprus Swimming Federation
- Website: koek.org.cy

in Singapore
- Competitors: 4 in 1 sport
- Medals: Gold 0 Silver 0 Bronze 0 Total 0

World Aquatics Championships appearances
- 1973; 1975; 1978; 1982; 1986; 1991; 1994; 1998; 2001; 2003; 2005; 2007; 2009; 2011; 2013; 2015; 2017; 2019; 2022; 2023; 2024; 2025

Cyprus is competing at the 2025 World Aquatics Championships in Singapore from 11 July to 3 August 2025.

== Competitors ==
The following is the list of competitors in the Championships.

Sport	Men	Women	Total
Swimming	2	2	4
Total	2	2	4

== Swimming ==
Men

Athlete	Event	Heat		Semifinal		Final	
Athlete	Event	Time	Rank	Time	Rank	Time	Rank
Filippos Iakovidis	50 m backstroke	26.79	54	Did not advance			
Panayiotis Panaretos	50 m breaststroke	28.61	54	Did not advance			
Panayiotis Panaretos	100 m breaststroke	1:04.25	55	Did not advance			

Women

Athlete	Event	Heat		Semifinal		Final	
Athlete	Event	Time	Rank	Time	Rank	Time	Rank
Maria Erokhina	100 m breaststroke	1:10.90	44	Did not advance			
Maria Erokhina	200 m breaststroke	2:34.62	30	Did not advance			
