= Cyprus at the 2017 World Aquatics Championships =

- Flag of Cyprus
- FINA code: CYP
- National federation: Swimming Association of Cyprus

in Budapest, Hungary
- Competitors: 4 in 1 sport
- Medals: Gold 0 Silver 0 Bronze 0 Total 0

World Aquatics Championships appearances
- 1973; 1975; 1978; 1982; 1986; 1991; 1994; 1998; 2001; 2003; 2005; 2007; 2009; 2011; 2013; 2015; 2017; 2019; 2022; 2023; 2024

Cyprus competed at the 2017 World Aquatics Championships in Budapest, Hungary from 14 to 30 July.

== Swimming ==
Cyprus has received a Universality invitation from FINA to send a maximum of four swimmers (two men and two women) to the World Championships.

| Athlete | Event | Heat | | Semifinal | | Final | |
| Athlete | Event | Time | Rank | Time | Rank | Time | Rank |
|---|---|---|---|---|---|---|---|
| Constantinos Hadjittooulis | Men's 400 m freestyle | 3:58.58 | 41 | — | | did not advance | |
| Constantinos Hadjittooulis | Men's 800 m freestyle | 8:23.30 | 29 | — | | did not advance | |
| Thomas Tsiopanis | Men's 200 m individual medley | 2:05.19 | 33 | did not advance | | | |
| Thomas Tsiopanis | Men's 400 m individual medley | 4:34.49 | 35 | — | | did not advance | |
| Kalia Antoniou | Women's 50 m freestyle | 26.31 | 42 | did not advance | | | |
| Kalia Antoniou | Women's 50 m backstroke | 30.59 | 46 | did not advance | | | |
| Alexandra Schegoleva | Women's 200 m breaststroke | 2:38.60 | 29 | did not advance | | | |
| Alexandra Schegoleva | Women's 50 m butterfly | 28.22 NR | =39 | did not advance | | | |
