= Cyprus at the 2019 World Aquatics Championships =

- Flag of Cyprus
- FINA code: CYP
- National federation: Swimming Association of Cyprus

in Gwangju, South Korea
- Medals: Gold 0 Silver 0 Bronze 0 Total 0

World Aquatics Championships appearances
- 1973; 1975; 1978; 1982; 1986; 1991; 1994; 1998; 2001; 2003; 2005; 2007; 2009; 2011; 2013; 2015; 2017; 2019; 2022; 2023; 2024

Cyprus competed at the 2019 World Aquatics Championships in Gwangju, South Korea from 12 to 28 July.

== Swimming ==
Cyprus entered four swimmers.

Men

Athlete	Event	Heat		Semifinal		Final	
Athlete	Event	Time	Rank	Time	Rank	Time	Rank
Filippos Iakovidis	50 m backstroke	27.00	54	did not advance			
Filippos Iakovidis	100 m backstroke	58.26	49	did not advance			
Omiros Zagkas	50 m freestyle	23.37	60	did not advance			
Omiros Zagkas	100 m freestyle	52.44	79	did not advance			

Women

Athlete	Event	Heat		Semifinal		Final	
Athlete	Event	Time	Rank	Time	Rank	Time	Rank
Kalia Antoniou	50 m freestyle	25.86	32	did not advance			
Kalia Antoniou	100 m freestyle	56.53	39	did not advance			
Alexandra Schegoleva	50 m butterfly	27.74	37	did not advance			
Alexandra Schegoleva	200 m individual medley	2:20.66	30	did not advance			
