= Cyprus at the 2023 World Aquatics Championships =

- Flag of Cyprus
- FINA code: CYP
- National federation: Cyprus Swimming Federation
- Website: koek.org.cy

in Fukuoka, Japan
- Competitors: 4 in 1 sport
- Medals: Gold 0 Silver 0 Bronze 0 Total 0

World Aquatics Championships appearances
- 1973; 1975; 1978; 1982; 1986; 1991; 1994; 1998; 2001; 2003; 2005; 2007; 2009; 2011; 2013; 2015; 2017; 2019; 2022; 2023; 2024

Cyprus is set to compete at the 2023 World Aquatics Championships in Fukuoka, Japan from 14 to 30 July.

== Swimming ==
Cyprus entered 4 swimmers.

Men

Athlete	Event	Heat		Semifinal		Final	
Athlete	Event	Time	Rank	Time	Rank	Time	Rank
Nikolas Antoniou	50 metre freestyle	23.27	59	Did not advance			
Nikolas Antoniou	100 metre freestyle	51.23	59	Did not advance			
Filippos Iakovidis	50 metre backstroke	26.42	42	Did not advance			
Filippos Iakovidis	100 metre backstroke	57.51	48	Did not advance			
Panayiotis Panaretos	50 metre breaststroke	28.55	35	Did not advance			
Panayiotis Panaretos	100 metre breaststroke	1:04.38	52	Did not advance			

Women

Athlete	Event	Heat		Semifinal		Final	
Athlete	Event	Time	Rank	Time	Rank	Time	Rank
Kalia Antoniou	50 metre freestyle	25.33	22	Did not advance			
Kalia Antoniou	100 metre freestyle	54.74	17	Did not advance			
