= Cyprus at the 2024 World Aquatics Championships =

- Flag of Cyprus
- FINA code: CYP
- National federation: Cyprus Swimming Federation
- Website: koek.org.cy

in Doha, Qatar
- Competitors: 3 in 1 sport
- Medals: Gold 0 Silver 0 Bronze 0 Total 0

World Aquatics Championships appearances
- 1973; 1975; 1978; 1982; 1986; 1991; 1994; 1998; 2001; 2003; 2005; 2007; 2009; 2011; 2013; 2015; 2017; 2019; 2022; 2023; 2024

Cyprus competed at the 2024 World Aquatics Championships in Doha, Qatar from 2 to 18 February.

== Competitors ==
The following is the list of competitors in the Championships.

Sport	Men	Women	Total
Swimming	2	1	3
Total	2	1	3

== Swimming ==
Cyprus entered 3 swimmers.

Men

Athlete	Event	Heat		Semifinal		Final	
Athlete	Event	Time	Rank	Time	Rank	Time	Rank
Filippos Iakovidis	50 metre backstroke	26.43	34	Did not advance			
Filippos Iakovidis	50 metre butterfly	26.00	47	Did not advance			
Panayiotis Panaretos	50 metre breaststroke	28.75	37	Did not advance			
Panayiotis Panaretos	100 metre breaststroke	1:03.35	43	Did not advance			

Women

Athlete	Event	Heat		Semifinal		Final	
Athlete	Event	Time	Rank	Time	Rank	Time	Rank
Kalia Antoniou	50 metre freestyle	25.21	16 Q	24.96	14	Did not advance	
Kalia Antoniou	100 metre freestyle	54.49	7 Q	55.04	14	Did not advance	
