= Cyprus at the 2015 World Aquatics Championships =

- Flag of Cyprus
- World Aquatics code: CYP
- National federation: Swimming Association of Cyprus

in Kazan, Russia
- Competitors: 4 in 1 sport
- Medals: Gold 0 Silver 0 Bronze 0 Total 0

World Aquatics Championships appearances
- 1973; 1975; 1978; 1982; 1986; 1991; 1994; 1998; 2001; 2003; 2005; 2007; 2009; 2011; 2013; 2015; 2017; 2019; 2022; 2023; 2024; 2025

Cyprus competed at the 2015 World Aquatics Championships in Kazan, Russia from 24 July to 9 August 2015.

== Swimming ==
Cypriot swimmers have achieved qualifying standards in the following events (up to a maximum of 2 swimmers in each event at the A-standard entry time, and 1 at the B-standard):

Men

Athlete	Event	Heat		Semifinal		Final	
Athlete	Event	Time	Rank	Time	Rank	Time	Rank
Iacovos Hadjiconstantinou	200 m freestyle	1:57.38	67	did not advance			
Iacovos Hadjiconstantinou	400 m freestyle	4:06.38	62	—N/a		did not advance	
Markos Kalopsidiotis	50 m breaststroke	29.08	48	did not advance			
Markos Kalopsidiotis	100 m breaststroke	DSQ		did not advance			

Women

Athlete	Event	Heat		Semifinal		Final	
Athlete	Event	Time	Rank	Time	Rank	Time	Rank
Chrysoula Karamanou	100 m freestyle	58.65	56	did not advance			
Chrysoula Karamanou	200 m freestyle	2:09.01	54	did not advance			
Sotiria Neofytou	50 m butterfly	28.25	41	did not advance			
Sotiria Neofytou	100 m butterfly	1:02.83	44	did not advance			
