= 2021 FINA World Swimming Championships (25 m) – Women's 50 metre freestyle =

Swimming competition

Women's 50 metre freestyle at the 2021 FINA World Swimming Championships (25 m)
- Venue: Etihad Arena
- Location: Abu Dhabi, United Arab Emirates
- Dates: 20 December (heats and semifinals); 21 December (final)
- Competitors: 90 from 84 nations
- Winning time: 23.08 CR

Medalists
gold medal	Sarah Sjöström	Sweden
silver medal	Ranomi Kromowidjojo	Netherlands
bronze medal	Katarzyna Wasick	Poland

The Women's 50 metre freestyle competition of the 2021 FINA World Swimming Championships (25 m) was held on 20 and 21 December 2021.

== Records ==
Prior to the competition, the existing world and championship records were as follows.

World record	Ranomi Kromowidjojo (NED)	22.93	Berlin, Germany	7 August 2017
Competition record	Ranomi Kromowidjojo (NED)	23.19	Hangzhou, China	16 December 2018

The following new records were set during this competition:

Date	Event	Name	Nation	Time	Record
21 December	Final	Sarah Sjöström	Sweden	23.08	CR

== Results ==
=== Heats ===
The heats were started on 20 December at 10:58.

Rank	Heat	Lane	Name	Nationality	Time	Notes
1	11	4	Sarah Sjöström	Sweden	23.31	Q
2	10	4	Katarzyna Wasick	Poland	23.63	Q
3	11	5	Abbey Weitzeil	United States	23.69	Q
4	9	4	Ranomi Kromowidjojo	Netherlands	23.86	Q
5	10	5	Maria Kameneva	Russian Swimming Federation	23.89	Q
6	9	3	Holly Barratt	Australia	24.04	Q
7	10	3	Arina Surkova	Russian Swimming Federation	24.08	Q
8	11	9	Claire Curzan	United States	24.11	Q
9	10	6	Julie Kepp Jensen	Denmark	24.15	Q
9	11	3	Michelle Coleman	Sweden	24.15	Q
9	11	6	Silvia Di Pietro	Italy	24.15	Q
12	9	5	Béryl Gastaldello	France	24.23	Q
13	11	1	Cheng Yujie	China	24.34	Q
14	11	2	Kim Busch	Netherlands	24.40	Q
15	8	3	Farida Osman	Egypt	24.43	Q
16	10	7	Wu Qingfeng	China	24.44	Q
17	9	1	Costanza Cocconcelli	Italy	24.56	
18	9	7	Nastassia Karakouskaya	Belarus	24.60	
19	7	5	Kalia Antoniou	Cyprus	24.67	NR
20	8	7	Jenjira Srisaard	Thailand	24.78	
20	8	8	Bianca Costea	Romania	24.78	
22	10	1	Danielle Hill	Ireland	24.83	
23	8	6	Diana Petkova	Bulgaria	24.86	
24	9	9	Laura Littlejohn	New Zealand	24.89	
25	8	4	Nina Stanisavljević	Serbia	24.94	
26	10	8	Tam Hoi Lam	Hong Kong	24.99	
27	11	8	Jeong So-eun	South Korea	25.04	
28	8	9	Jana Pavalić	Croatia	25.09	
29	9	0	Julie Meynen	Luxembourg	25.12	
29	11	0	Nina Kost	Switzerland	25.12	
31	7	7	Maddy Moore	Bermuda	25.15	NR
32	7	2	Maria Drasidou	Greece	25.19	
33	10	9	Nina Gangl	Austria	25.21	
34	8	2	Jóhanna Elín Guðmundsdóttir	Iceland	25.25	
35	7	3	Amel Melih	Algeria	25.35	NR
36	7	8	Nikol Merizaj	Albania	25.40	NR
37	8	0	Cherelle Thompson	Trinidad and Tobago	25.42	
38	7	6	Jasmine Alkhaldi	Philippines	25.64	
39	7	4	Gabriela Ņikitina	Latvia	25.72	
40	10	0	Selen Özbilen	Turkey	25.91	
41	1	0	María José Ribera	Bolivia	26.00	
42	6	4	Chloe Farro	Aruba	26.13	
42	7	1	Kirabo Namutebi	Uganda	26.13	
44	6	5	Zaneta Alvaranga	Jamaica	26.18	
45	6	2	Imane El Barodi	Morocco	26.32	NR
46	7	0	Marie Khoury	Lebanon	26.57	
47	6	3	Varsenik Manucharyan	Armenia	26.59	
48	6	1	Mikaili Charlemagne	Saint Lucia	26.60	
49	1	2	Alisa Bech Vestergård	Faroe Islands	26.61	
50	6	7	Lauren Hew	Cayman Islands	26.79	
51	5	2	Aleka Persaud	Guyana	26.86	
52	6	0	Samantha Roberts	Antigua and Barbuda	26.87	
53	7	9	Norah Milanesi	Cameroon	26.96	
54	6	6	Mònica Ramírez	Andorra	26.97	
55	2	0	Khuyagbaataryn Enkhzul	Mongolia	27.11	
56	5	4	Unilez Takyi	Ghana	27.21	
57	5	3	Mona Kilani	Jordan	27.25	
58	6	8	Jeanne Boutbien	Senegal	27.27	
59	6	9	Jovana Kuljača	Montenegro	27.29	
60	5	5	Gabriela Santis	Guatemala	27.30	
61	5	7	Mariam Imnadze	Georgia	27.50	
62	4	3	Marina Abu Shamaleh	Palestine	27.57	NR
63	5	6	Bhakthi Karunasena	Sri Lanka	27.61	
64	2	2	Arleigha Hall	Turks and Caicos Islands	27.76	
65	2	7	Kimberly Ince	Grenada	27.84	
66	5	9	Mya de Freitas	Saint Vincent and the Grenadines	28.03	
67	4	5	Noelani Day	Tonga	28.14	
68	5	8	Ayah Binrajab	Bahrain	28.16	
69	2	5	Viktoriia Kutuzova	Kyrgyzstan	28.38	
70	1	5	Muynin Kaing	Cambodia	28.42	NR
71	3	6	Ekaterina Bordachyova	Tajikistan	28.71	
72	5	0	Fjorda Shabani	Kosovo	28.75	
73	4	6	Jessica Makwenda	Malawi	28.98	
74	4	1	Taffi Illis	Sint Maarten	29.11	
75	4	2	Nafissath Radji	Benin	29.23	
76	4	8	Iman Kouraogo	Burkina Faso	29.71	
77	2	8	Asaka Litulumar	Northern Mariana Islands	29.96	
78	1	6	Kayla Hepler	Marshall Islands	30.03	
79	4	0	Tity Dumbuya	Sierra Leone	30.50	
80	1	8	Yuri Hosei	Palau	31.54	
81	3	5	Aya Mpali	Gabon	32.00	
82	4	9	Alyse Maniriho	Burundi	32.75	
83	3	2	Imelda Ximenes Belo	Timor-Leste	32.84	
84	3	3	Rahel Gebresilassie	Ethiopia	33.47	
85	3	4	Chloe Sauvourel	Central African Republic	33.78	
86	2	1	Claudette Ishimwe	Rwanda	36.59	
87	3	8	Mariama Toure	Guinea	37.20	
88	3	9	Aicha Ali Adabo	Djibouti	42.80	
89	1	7	Toussanti Hassani	Comoros	50.31	
	3	1	Leena Mohamedahmed	Sudan	DSQ	
	1	1	Juanita Ndong Eyenga	Equatorial Guinea	DNS	
	1	3	Sainabou Sam	Gambia	DNS	
	1	4	Anaikah Thélémaque	Haiti	DNS	
	2	3	Sonia Aktar	Bangladesh	DNS	
	2	4	Lucie Kouadio-Patinier	Ivory Coast	DNS	
	2	6	Marie Amenou	Togo	DNS	
	2	9	Eunike Mathayo	Tanzania	DNS	
	3	0	Aminata Sangafe	Mali	DNS	
	3	7	Bellore Sangala	Republic of the Congo	DNS	
	4	4	Abiola Ogunbanwo	Nigeria	DNS	
	4	7	Anushiya Tandukar	Nepal	DNS	
	5	1	Jayla Pina	Cape Verde	DNS	
	8	1	Lucy Hope	Great Britain	DNS	
	8	5	Lillian Slušná	Slovakia	DNS	
	9	2	Kayla Sanchez	Canada	DNS	
	9	6	Fanny Teijonsalo	Finland	DNS	
	9	8	Amanda Lim	Singapore	DNS	
	10	2	Marie Wattel	France	DNS	
	11	7	Barbora Seemanová	Czech Republic	DNS	

=== Semifinals ===
The semifinals were started on 20 December at 18:47.

Rank	Heat	Lane	Name	Nationality	Time	Notes
1	2	4	Sarah Sjöström	Sweden	23.30	Q
2	1	4	Katarzyna Wasick	Poland	23.41	Q
3	1	5	Ranomi Kromowidjojo	Netherlands	23.54	Q
4	2	5	Abbey Weitzeil	United States	23.63	Q
5	2	3	Maria Kameneva	Russian Swimming Federation	23.74	Q
6	1	6	Claire Curzan	United States	23.80	Q
7	1	3	Holly Barratt	Australia	23.90	Q
8	2	7	Silvia Di Pietro	Italy	23.94	Q
9	1	2	Michelle Coleman	Sweden	23.96	
10	2	6	Arina Surkova	Russian Swimming Federation	24.00	
11	1	7	Béryl Gastaldello	France	24.02	
12	2	2	Julie Kepp Jensen	Denmark	24.03	
13	2	1	Cheng Yujie	China	24.05	
14	1	8	Wu Qingfeng	China	24.15	
15	1	1	Kim Busch	Netherlands	24.43	
16	2	8	Farida Osman	Egypt	24.49	

=== Final ===
The final was held on 21 December at 19:37.

Rank	Lane	Name	Nationality	Time	Notes
1st place, gold medalist(s)	4	Sarah Sjöström	Sweden	23.08	CR
2nd place, silver medalist(s)	3	Ranomi Kromowidjojo	Netherlands	23.31	
3rd place, bronze medalist(s)	5	Katarzyna Wasick	Poland	23.40	
4	2	Maria Kameneva	Russian Swimming Federation	23.48	NR
5	6	Abbey Weitzeil	United States	23.58	
6	7	Claire Curzan	United States	23.91	
7	1	Holly Barratt	Australia	23.96	
8	8	Silvia Di Pietro	Italy	23.98	
