= Cyprus at the 2022 World Aquatics Championships =

- Flag of Cyprus
- FINA code: CYP
- National federation: Swimming Association of Cyprus

in Budapest, Hungary
- Competitors: 4 in 1 sport
- Medals: Gold 0 Silver 0 Bronze 0 Total 0

World Aquatics Championships appearances
- 1973; 1975; 1978; 1982; 1986; 1991; 1994; 1998; 2001; 2003; 2005; 2007; 2009; 2011; 2013; 2015; 2017; 2019; 2022; 2023; 2024

Cyprus competed at the 2022 World Aquatics Championships in Budapest, Hungary from 17 June to 3 July.

== Swimming ==
Cyprus entered four swimmers.

Men

Athlete	Event	Heat		Semifinal		Final	
Athlete	Event	Time	Rank	Time	Rank	Time	Rank
Nikolas Antoniou	50 m freestyle	22.77	45	did not advance			
Nikolas Antoniou	100 m freestyle	49.97	40	did not advance			
Filippos Iakovidis	50 m backstroke	26.91	36	did not advance			
Filippos Iakovidis	50 m breaststroke	30.13	49	did not advance			

Women

Athlete	Event	Heat		Semifinal		Final	
Athlete	Event	Time	Rank	Time	Rank	Time	Rank
Kalia Antoniou	50 m freestyle	25.14	10 Q	24.94	10	did not advance	
Kalia Antoniou	100 m freestyle	54.25	=9 Q	54.24	13	did not advance	
Polyxeni Toumazou	50 m breaststroke	33.31	39	did not advance			
Polyxeni Toumazou	100 m breaststroke	1:16.14	46	did not advance			
