= List of Czech records in swimming =

The Czech Records in Swimming are the fastest times ever swum by a swimmer representing the Czech Republic. These records are kept/maintained by the Czech Aquatics (Český svaz plaveckých sportů) (ČSPS).

Records are recognized for males and females in the following long course (50 m) and short course (25 m) events:

- freestyle: 50, 100, 200, 400, 800 and 1500 m
- backstroke: 50, 100 and 200 m
- breaststroke: 50, 100 and 200 m
- butterfly: 50, 100 and 200 m
- individual medley: 100 m (25 m only), 200 and 400 m
- relays: 4x50 m free (25 m only), 4x100 m free, 4x200 m free, 4x50 m medley (25 m only), and 4x100 m medley

Note: In the relay events, all records are by Czech club teams, and not by Czech national teams.

All records were set in finals unless noted otherwise.

== Long course (50 m) ==
=== Men ===
Event	Time		Name	Club	Date	Meet	Location	Ref
50 m freestyle	22.03	sf	Jan Foltyn	Czech Republic	9 July 2026 (Note: by official result source; 7 July 2026 by ČSPS source, a typo)	European Junior Championships	Munich, Germany	
100 m freestyle	48.93	h	Daniel Gracík	Czech Republic	26 May 2024 (Note: by official result source; 25 May 2024 by ČSPS source, a typo)	AP Race London International	London, Great Britain	
200 m freestyle	1:48.35	sf	Květoslav Svoboda	Czech Republic	1 August 2002	European Championships	Berlin, Germany	
400 m freestyle	3:48.32		Jan Micka	Czech Republic	26 August 2013	World Junior Championships	Dubai, United Arab Emirates	
800 m freestyle	7:48.93	h	Jan Micka	Czech Republic	23 July 2019	World Championships	Gwangju, South Korea	
1500 m freestyle	14:48.52		Jan Micka	Czech Republic	13 April 2019	Swim Open Stockholm	Stockholm, Sweden	
50 m backstroke	24.11		Miroslav Knedla	Czech Republic	14 August 2026 (Note: by official result source; 10 August 2026 by ČSPS source, a typo)	European Championships	Paris, France	
100 m backstroke	53.15	sf	Miroslav Knedla	Czech Republic	28 July 2025	World Championships	Singapore, Singapore	
200 m backstroke	1:54.40	sf	Jan Čejka	Czech Republic	11 August 2026 (Note: by official result source; 10 August 2026 by ČSPS source, a typo)	European Championships	Paris, France	
50 m breaststroke	27.18	=	Jan Foltyn	PK Slavia VS Plzen	23 April 2026	Graz Trophy	Graz, Austria	
50 m breaststroke	27.18	h, =	Jan Foltyn	Czech Republic	7 July 2026	European Junior Championships	Munich, Germany	
100 m breaststroke	1:00.63	so	Matěj Zábojník	Czech Republic	11 August 2022	European Championships	Rome, Italy	
200 m breaststroke	2:10.40		Matěj Zábojník	Czech Republic	9 April 2022	Swim Open Stockholm	Stockholm, Sweden	
50 m butterfly	23.23		Daniel Gracík	Czech Republic	27 May 2024 (Note: by official result source; 25 May 2024 by ČSPS source, a typo)	AP Race London International	London, United Kingdom	
100 m butterfly	51.40		Daniel Gracík	Czech Republic	20 June 2024	European Championships	Belgrade, Serbia	
200 m butterfly	1:56.75		Ondřej Gemov	Czech Republic	21 October 2023 (Note: by official result source; 20 October 2023 by ČSPS source, a typo)	World Cup	Budapest, Hungary	
200 m individual medley	1:58.33	sf	Jan Čejka	Czech Republic	15 August 2026 (Note: by official result source; 10 August 2026 by ČSPS source, a typo)	European Championships	Paris, France	
400 m individual medley	4:15.30		Jakub Bursa	SPK Slavia Liberec	26 April 2025	Grand Prix Pardubice	Pardubice, Czech Republic	
4 × 100 m freestyle relay	3:23.92		Miroslav Knedla (49.01); Patrik Zemek (51.48); Václav Vaculík (51.42); Štěpán Lebeda (52.01)	Plavecky klub Zlin	26 June 2026	Czech Summer Championships	Prague, Czech Republic	
4 × 200 m freestyle relay	7:29.92		David Noll; Tomáš Havránek; Jan Hanzal; Petr Novák	Bohemians Praha	14 July 2018	Czech Summer Championships	Prague, Czech Republic	
4 × 100 m medley relay	3:44.78		Jan Čejka; Albert Moc; Pavel Janeček; Daniel Gracík	SCPAP	19 March 2022	Czech Team Championships	České Budějovice, Czech Republic	

Legend: # – Record awaiting ratification by Czech Swimming Federation; WR – World record; ER – European record; e – equalled existing record;
Records not set in finals: h – heat; sf – semifinal; r – relay 1st leg; rh – relay heat 1st leg; b – B final; † – en route to final mark; so – swim-off; tt – time trial

Nation team times in relays
These appear to be the fastest times swum by Czech national relays at events; however, these times are not listed by CSPS as Czech records. (They have also not been verified as the fastest times.)

Event	Time		Name	Club	Date	Meet	Location	Ref
4×100 m freestyle relay	3:18.67	h	Michal Rubáček (49.46); Martin Verner (48.87); Jan Šefl (50.11); Květoslav Svoboda (50.23)	Czech Republic	26 July 2009	World Championships	Rome, Italy	
4×200 m freestyle relay	7:22.48	h	Jakub Štemberk (1:50.07); Adam Hloben (1:48.70); Sebastian Luňák (1:52.61); Roman Procházka (1:51.10)	Czech Republic	23 August 2019	World Junior Championships	Budapest, Hungary	
4×100 m medley relay	3:37.10	h	Tomáš Fučík (55.88); Petr Bartůněk (1:01.28); Michal Rubáček (51.26); Martin Verner (48.68)	Czech Republic	2 August 2009	World Championships	Rome, Italy	

Legend: WR – World record; ER – European record; e – equalled existing record;
Records not set in finals: h – heat; sf – semifinal; r – relay 1st leg; rh – relay heat 1st leg; b – B final; † – en route to final mark; so – swim-off; tt – time trial

=== Women ===
Event	Time		Name	Club	Date	Meet	Location	Ref
50 m freestyle	24.67		Barbora Seemanová	Czech Republic	18 May 2021	European Championships	Budapest, Hungary	
100 m freestyle	53.36		Barbora Janíčková	Czech Republic	11 August 2026 (Note: by official result source; 10 August 2026 by ČSPS source, a typo)	European Championships	Paris, France	
200 m freestyle	1:54.38		Barbora Seemanová	Czech Republic	13 August 2026 (Note: by official result source; 10 August 2026 by ČSPS source, a typo)	European Championships	Paris, France	
400 m freestyle	4:03.41		Barbora Seemanová	Czech Republic	25 May 2024	AP Race London International	London, United Kingdom	
800 m freestyle	8:35.84		Jana Pechanová	PK Příbram	8 July 2001	Czech Summer Championships	Prague, Czech Republic	
1500 m freestyle	16:34.00		Jana Pechanová	Czech Republic	28 August 2001	Universiade	Beijing, China	
50 m backstroke	27.78	h	Simona Baumrtová	Czech Republic	4 August 2018	European Championships	Glasgow, Great Britain	
100 m backstroke	59.65	sf	Simona Baumrtová	Czech Republic	24 July 2017	World Championships	Budapest, Hungary	
200 m backstroke	2:09.92		Simona Baumrtová	Czech Republic	13 June 2014	Trofeo Sette Colli	Rome, Italy	
50 m breaststroke	30.31	sf	Petra Chocová	Czech Republic	3 August 2013	World Championships	Barcelona, Spain	
100 m breaststroke	1:07.66	h	Petra Chocová	Czech Republic	19 August 2014	European Championships	Berlin, Germany	
200 m breaststroke	2:23.60		Kristýna Horská	Czech Republic	21 June 2024	European Championships	Belgrade, Serbia	
50 m butterfly	25.90		Daryna Nabojcenko	Czech Republic	28 June 2025 (Note: by official result source; 26 June 2025 by ČSPS source, a typo)	European U23 Championships	Šamorín, Slovakia	
100 m butterfly	57.43	h	Barbora Seemanová	Czech Republic	13 August 2026 (Note: by official result source; 10 August 2026 by ČSPS source, a typo)	European Championships	Paris, France	
200 m butterfly	2:11.65	sf	Barbora Závadová	Czech Republic	5 August 2018	European Championships	Glasgow, Great Britain	
200 m individual medley	2:11.25		Barbora Seemanová	Czech Republic	27 May 2024 (Note: by official result source; 25 May 2024 by ČSPS source, a typo)	AP Race London International	London, United Kingdom	
400 m individual medley	4:35.60	h	Barbora Závadová	Czech Republic	9 August 2015	World Championships	Kazan, Russia	
4 × 100 m freestyle relay	3:51.95		Dominika Geržová; Barbora Závadová; Magdaléna Osadníková; Zuzana Volovecká	KPS Ostrava	21 June 2019	Czech Summer Championships	České Budějovice, Czech Republic	
4 × 200 m freestyle relay	8:23.56		Věra Kopřivová; Tereza Závadová; Michaela Petrová; Barbora Závadová	KPS Ostrava	1 July 2016	Czech Summer Championships	Pardubice, Czech Republic	
4 × 100 m medley relay	4:15.31		Kristýna Horská; Martina Moravčíková; Anna Kolářová; Tereza Muselová	Bohemians Praha	6 July 2017	Czech Summer Championships	Prague, Czech Republic	

Legend: # – Record awaiting ratification by Czech Swimming Federation; WR – World record; ER – European record; e – equalled existing record;
Records not set in finals: h – heat; sf – semifinal; r – relay 1st leg; rh – relay heat 1st leg; b – B final; † – en route to final mark; so – swim-off; tt – time trial

Nation team times in relays
These appear to be the fastest times swum by Czech national relays at events; however, these times are not listed by CSPS as the Czech Records. (They have also not been verified as the fastest times.)

Event	Time		Name	Club	Date	Meet	Location	Ref
4×100 m freestyle relay	3:40.78	h	Barbora Seemanová (55.09); Anna Kolářová (55.93); Simona Kubová (55.50); Anika Apostalon (54.26)	Czech Republic	21 July 2019	World Championships	Gwangju, South Korea	
4×200 m freestyle relay	8:16.55		Kristýna Kyněrová; Marcela Kubalčíková; Jana Pechanová; Hana Netrefová	Czech Republic	24 August 2001	Summer Universiade	Beijing, China	
4×100 m medley relay	4:02.23	h	Simona Baumrtová (1:00.13); Martina Moravčíková (1:07.78); Lucia Svěcená (59.18); Anna Kolářová (55.16)	Czech Republic	30 July 2017	World Championships	Budapest, Hungary	

=== Mixed relay ===
Event	Time		Name	Club	Date	Meet	Location	Ref
4×100 m freestyle relay	3:23.21		Jakub Krischke (49.39); Miroslav Knedla (48.21); Barbora Janíčková (53.06); Barbora Seemanová (52.55)	Czech Republic	14 August 2026	European Championships	Paris, France	
4×100 m medley relay	3:48.86	h	Tomáš Franta (54.61); Matěj Zábojník (1:01.73); Barbora Janíčková (1:00.01); Barbora Seemanová (52.51)	Czech Republic	20 May 2021	European Championships	Budapest, Hungary	

Legend: # – Record awaiting ratification by Czech Swimming Federation; WR – World record; ER – European record; e – equalled existing record;
Records not set in finals: h – heat; so – swim-off

== Short course (25 m) ==
=== Men ===
Event	Time		Name	Club	Date	Meet	Location	Ref
50 m freestyle	21.16	h	Jan Foltyn	PK Slávia VŠ Plzeň	24 October 2026 (Note: by official result source; 23 October 2026 by ČSPS source, a typo)	Slovak Championships	Šamorín, Slovakia	
100 m freestyle	46.94	sf	Martin Verner	Czech Republic	11 December 2009	European Championships	Istanbul, Turkey	
200 m freestyle	1:43.54	h	Květoslav Svoboda	Czech Republic	14 December 2008	European Championships	Rijeka, Croatia	
400 m freestyle	3:40.60		Ondřej Gemov	PK Slavia VS Plzeň	16 October 2022	Plzeňské sprinty	Plzeň, Czech Republic	
800 m freestyle	7:33.23		Jan Micka	USK Praha	16 November 2018	Czech Championships	Plzeň, Czech Republic	
1500 m freestyle	14:24.88		Jan Micka	USK Praha	17 November 2018	Czech Championships	Plzeň, Czech Republic	
50 m backstroke	22.69		Miroslav Knedla	Czech Republic	7 December 2025 (Note: by official result source; 2 December 2025 by ČSPS source, a typo)	European Championships	Lublin, Poland	
100 m backstroke	49.60		Jan Čejka	SC Plavec.areal Pardubice	19 December 2025	Czech Championships	Plzeň, Czech Republic	
200 m backstroke	1:49.43		Jan Čejka	Czech Republic	3 December 2025	European Championships	Lublin, Poland	
50 m breaststroke	26.73	h	Matěj Zábojník	Czech Republic	6 December 2025 (Note: by official result source; 2 December 2025 by ČSPS source, a typo)	European Championships	Lublin, Poland	
100 m breaststroke	57.38	sf	Matěj Zábojník	Czech Republic	2 December 2025	European Championships	Lublin, Poland	
200 m breaststroke	2:04.57	h	Matěj Zábojník	Czech Republic	16 December 2022 (Note: by official result source; 13 December 2022 by ČSPS source, a typo)	World Championships	Melbourne, Australia	
50 m butterfly	22.38	sf	Daniel Gracík	Czech Republic	2 December 2025	European Championships	Lublin, Poland	
100 m butterfly	50.02	sf	Daniel Gracík	Czech Republic	5 December 2023	European Championships	Otopeni, Romania	
200 m butterfly	1:52.46	sf	Ondřej Gemov	Czech Republic	7 December 2023 (Note: by official result source; 5 December 2023 by ČSPS source, a typo)	European Championships	Otopeni, Romania	
100 m individual medley	51.71		Miroslav Knedla	Czech Republic	4 December 2025 (Note: by official result source; 2 December 2025 by ČSPS source, a typo)	European Championships	Lublin, Poland	
200 m individual medley	1:54.79	h	Jakub Bursa	Czech Republic	5 December 2025 (Note: by official result source; 2 December 2025 by ČSPS source, a typo)	European Championships	Lublin, Poland	
400 m individual medley	4:04.68	h	Jakub Bursa	Czech Republic	7 December 2025 (Note: by official result source; 2 December 2025 by ČSPS source, a typo)	European Championships	Lublin, Poland	
4 × 50 m freestyle relay	1:28.90		Matěj Vobořil (22.59); Ondřej Fleischmann (22.41); Dominik Vavrečka (22.12); Josef Moser (21.78)	Kometa Brno	18 December 2016	Czech Championships	Plzeň, Czech Republic	
4 × 100 m freestyle relay	3:20.01		Matěj Vobořil (51.43); Ondřej Němec (50.97); Květoslav Svoboda; Martin Verner	Kometa Brno	17 December 2011	Czech Championships	Chomutov, Czech Republic	
4 × 200 m freestyle relay	7:22.53		Martin Verner (1:49.42); Jakub Kočař (1:51.94); Ondřej Němec; Květoslav Svoboda	Kometa Brno	16 December 2011	Czech Championships	Chomutov, Czech Republic	
4 × 50 m medley relay	1:34.63	#	David Ludvík (24.76); Matěj Zábojník (26.46); Daniel Gracík (22.16); Radim Švarc (21.25)	KPSP Kometa Brno	18 December 2025	Czech Championships	Plzeň, Czech Republic	
4 × 100 m medley relay	3:39.35		Adam Liška (54.88); Petr Bartůněk (58.91); Jiří Žák; Ondřej Kubínek	TJ Chemička Ústí nad Labem	1 December 2013	Czech Championships	Plzeň, Czech Republic	

Legend: # – Record awaiting ratification by Czech Swimming Federation; WR – World record; ER – European record; e – equalled existing record;
Records not set in finals: h – heat; sf – semifinal; r – relay 1st leg; rh – relay heat 1st leg; b – B final; † – en route to final mark; so – swim-off; tt – time trial

Nation team times in relays
These appear to be the fastest times swum by Czech national relays at events; however, these times are not listed by CSPS as the Czech Records. (They have also not been verified as the fastest times.)

Event	Time		Name	Club	Date	Meet	Location	Ref
4×50 m freestyle relay	1:26.53		Tomáš Plevko (21.63); Martin Verner (21.75); Michal Ledl (21.92); Jan Šefl (21.23)	Czech Republic	25 November 2012	European Championships	Chartres, France	
4×100 m freestyle relay	3:15.28	h	Michal Rubáček (48.44); Martin Verner (48.12); Tomáš Fucík (49.97); Jan Šefl (48.75)	Czech Republic	15 December 2010	World Championships	Dubai, United Arab Emirates	
4×200 m freestyle relay	7:04.42		Jan Šefl (1:45.22); Michal Rubáček (1:46.12); Martin Verner (1:46.52); Květoslav Svoboda (1:46.56)	Czech Republic	16 December 2010	World Championships	Dubai, United Arab Emirates	
4×50 m medley relay	1:31.93		Miroslav Knedla (22.85); Matěj Zábojník (26.27); Daniel Gracík (22.03); Jan Foltyn (20.78)	Czech Republic	7 December 2025	European Championships	Lublin, Poland	
4×100 m medley relay	3:26.18	h	Tomáš Franta (50.42); Matěj Zábojník (57.42); Jan Šefl (50.48); Daniel Gracík (47.86)	Czech Republic	18 December 2022	World Championships	Melbourne, Australia	

=== Women ===
Event	Time		Name	Club	Date	Meet	Location	Ref
50 m freestyle	23.99	h	Barbora Janíčková	Czech Republic	14 December 2024 (Note: by official result source; 10 December 2024 by ČSPS source, a typo)	World Championships	Budapest, Hungary	
100 m freestyle	51.71	=	Barbora Seemanová	Iron	28 November 2021	International Swimming League	Eindhoven, Netherlands	
100 m freestyle	51.71	=	Barbora Janíčková	SK UP Olomouc	24 October 2026	Slovak Championships	Šamorín, Slovakia	
200 m freestyle	1:52.66	=	Barbora Seemanová	Czech Republic	18 December 2022 (Note: by official result source; 13 December 2022 by ČSPS, a typo)	World Championships	Melbourne, Australia	
200 m freestyle	1:52.66	=	Barbora Seemanová	MoP	15 October 2023	Plzeňské Sprinty	Plzeň, Czech Republic	
200 m freestyle	1:52.66	=	Barbora Seemanová	Czech Republic	10 December 2023	European Championships	Otopeni, Romania	
400 m freestyle	4:00.15		Barbora Seemanová	Czech Republic	21 October 2022	World Cup	Berlin, Germany	
800 m freestyle	8:27.52		Barbora Seemanová	Czech Republic	9 November 2019	Mladost Meet	Zagreb, Croatia	
1500 m freestyle	16:08.08		Martina Elhenická	TJ Lokomotiva Trutnov	21 October 2017	Plzeňské sprinty	Plzeň, Czech Republic	
50 m backstroke	26.17	h	Simona Kubová	Czech Republic	15 December 2022 (Note: by official result source; 13 December 2022 by ČSPS, a typo)	World Championships	Melbourne, Australia	
100 m backstroke	56.28		Simona Baumrtová	Czech Republic	13 December 2013	European Championships	Herning, Denmark	
200 m backstroke	2:03.06		Simona Baumrtová	Czech Republic	15 December 2013	European Championships	Herning, Denmark	
50 m breaststroke	30.00	h	Petra Chocová	Czech Republic	12 December 2013	European Championships	Herning, Denmark	
100 m breaststroke	1:04.78	h, =	Kristýna Horská	Czech Republic	11 December 2024 (Note: by official result source; 10 December 2024 by ČSPS source, a typo)	World Championships	Budapest, Hungary	
100 m breaststroke	1:04.78	sf, =	Kristýna Horská	Czech Republic	11 December 2024 (Note: by official result source; 10 December 2024 by ČSPS source, a typo)	World Championships	Budapest, Hungary	
200 m breaststroke	2:18.31		Kristýna Horská	Czech Republic	13 December 2024 (Note: by official result source; 10 December 2024 by ČSPS source, a typo)	World Championships	Budapest, Hungary	
50 m butterfly	25.30		Daryna Nabojčenko	Ustecka akademie plaveckych sp	8 November 2025	Grand Prix Brno	Brno, Czech Republic	
100 m butterfly	56.86	sf	Barbora Seemanová	SK Motorlet Praha	15 December 2023	Czech Championships	Plzeň, Czech Republic	
200 m butterfly	2:09.46		Barbora Seemanová	SK Motorlet Praha	18 October 2019	Plzeňské sprinty	Plzeň, Czech Republic	
100 m individual medley	57.97	sf	Barbora Janíčková	Czech Republic	3 December 2025 (Note: by official result source; 2 December 2025 by ČSPS source, a typo)	European Championships	Lublin, Poland	
200 m individual medley	2:08.61		Simona Baumrtová	TJ Slávie Chomutov	29 November 2013	Czech Championships	Plzeň, Czech Republic	
400 m individual medley	4:28.21		Barbora Závadová	Czech Republic	11 December 2011	European Championships	Szczecin, Poland	
4 × 50 m freestyle relay	1:43.69		Michaela Vodičková (26.89); Veronika Tondrová (25.61); Adéla Kracíková (25.78); Kristýna Štemberová (25.41)	PK Slávia VŠ Plzeň	13 December 2019	Czech Championships	Plzeň, Czech Republic	
4 × 50 m freestyle relay	1:42.05	#	Anna Plíhalová (27.23); Sára Černá (24.69); Karolína Maršíková (26.31); Daryna Nabojčenko (23.82)	Ustecka akademie plaveckych sp	19 December 2025	Czech Championships	Plzeň, Czech Republic	
4 × 100 m freestyle relay	3:48.17		Tereza Kanalošová (58.13); Michaela Petrová (57.56); Petra Gebauerová; Barbora Závadová	KPS Ostrava	30 November 2013	Czech Championships	Plzeň, Czech Republic	
4 × 200 m freestyle relay	8:16.70		Barbora Závadová (2:00.95); Tereza Závadová (2:06.03); Petra Gebauerová; Michaela Petrová	KPS Ostrava	29 November 2013	Czech Championships	Plzeň, Czech Republic	
4 × 50 m medley relay	1:50.72	#	Anežka Doksanská (29.06); Anna Plíhalová (31.58); Daryna Nabojčenko (25.47); Sára Černá (24.61)	Ustecka akademie plaveckych sp	18 December 2025	Czech Championships	Plzeň, Czech Republic	
4 × 100 m medley relay	4:11.21		Ilona Hlaváčková; Michelle Vlasáková; Andrea Šimáková; Petra Skřivánková	TJ Bohemians Praha	1 December 2001	-	Plzeň, Czech Republic	

Legend: # – Record awaiting ratification by Czech Swimming Federation; WR – World record; ER – European record; e – equalled existing record;
Records not set in finals: h – heat; sf – semifinal; r – relay 1st leg; rh – relay heat 1st leg; b – B final; † – en route to final mark; so – swim-off; tt – time trial

Nation team times in relays
These appear to be the fastest times swum by Czech national relays at events; however, these times are not listed by CSPS as the Czech Records. (They have also not been verified as the fastest times.)

Event	Time		Name	Club	Date	Meet	Location	Ref
4×50 m freestyle relay	1:38.24		Simona Kubová (25.06); Anika Apostalon (23.91); Barbora Seemanová (23.90); Barbora Závadová (25.37)	Czech Republic	16 December 2018	World Championships	Hangzhou, China	
4×100 m freestyle relay								
4×200 m freestyle relay	7:52.89	h	Barbora Seemanová (1:58.63); Simona Baumrtová (1:57.33); Barbora Závadová (1:58.15); Martina Elhenická (1:58.78)	Czech Republic	10 December 2016	World Championships	Windsor, Canada	
4×50 m medley relay	1:46.17		Simona Kubová (26.58); Petra Chocová (29.90); Lucie Svěcená (25.86); Anika Apostalon (23.83)	Czech Republic	12 December 2018	World Championships	Hangzhou, China	
4×100 m medley relay	3:56.86	h	Simona Baumrtová (57.77); Martina Moravčíková (1:07.32); Lucie Svěcená (58.13); Barbora Seemanová (53.64)	Czech Republic	11 December 2016	World Championships	Windsor, Canada	

=== Mixed relay ===
Event	Time		Name	Club	Date	Meet	Location	Ref
4×50 m freestyle relay	1:34.16	h	Tomáš Plevko (21.95); Martin Verner (21.74); Aneta Pechancová (24.92); Barbora Závadová (25.55)	Czech Republic	24 November 2012	European Championships	Chartres, France	
4×50 m medley relay	1:39.29		Miroslav Knedla (23.27); Matěj Zábojník (26.44); Daryna Nabojčenko (25.68); Barbora Janíčková (23.91)	Czech Republic	10 December 2023	European Championships	Otopeni, Romania	

Legend: # – Record awaiting ratification by Czech Swimming Federation; e – equalled existing record;
Records not set in finals: h – heat; so – swim-off
