= Cyprus at the 2013 World Aquatics Championships =

- Flag of Cyprus
- FINA code: CYP
- National federation: Swimming Association of Cyprus

in Barcelona, Spain
- Competitors: 3 in 1 sports
- Medals Ranked -th: Gold 0 Silver 0 Bronze 0 Total 0

World Aquatics Championships appearances
- 1973; 1975; 1978; 1982; 1986; 1991; 1994; 1998; 2001; 2003; 2005; 2007; 2009; 2011; 2013; 2015; 2017; 2019; 2022; 2023; 2024

Cyprus competed at the 2013 World Aquatics Championships in Barcelona, Spain from 19 July to 4 August 2013.

== Swimming ==
Cyprus qualified 3 quota places for the following swimming events:

Men

Athlete	Event	Heat		Semifinal		Final	
Athlete	Event	Time	Rank	Time	Rank	Time	Rank
Omiros Zagkas	50 m freestyle	DNS		did not advance			
Omiros Zagkas	50 m breaststroke	29.29	52	did not advance			
Alexandre Bakhtiarov	100 m butterfly	56.38	44	did not advance			

Women

Athlete	Event	Heat		Semifinal		Final	
Athlete	Event	Time	Rank	Time	Rank	Time	Rank
Irene Chrysostomou	100 m breaststroke	1:15.45	50	did not advance			
Irene Chrysostomou	200 m breaststroke	2:39.65	34	did not advance			
