= 2024 World Aquatics Swimming Championships (25 m) – Women's 200 metre breaststroke =

Swimming competition

Women's 200 metre breaststroke at the 2024 World Aquatics Swimming Championships (25 m)
- Venue: Duna Arena
- Location: Budapest, Hungary
- Dates: 13 December
- Competitors: 40 from 35 nations
- Winning time: 2:12.50 WR

Medalists
| gold medal | Kate Douglass | United States |
| silver medal | Evgeniia Chikunova |
| bronze medal | Alex Walsh | United States |

The women's 200 metre breaststroke event at the 2024 World Aquatics Swimming Championships (25 m) was held on 13 December 2024 at the Duna Arena in Budapest, Hungary.

== Records ==
Prior to the competition, the existing world and championship records were as follows:

| World record | Kate Douglass (USA) | 2:12.72 | Singapore | 31 October 2024 |
| Competition record | Kate Douglass (USA) | 2:15.77 | Melbourne, Australia | 16 December 2022 |

The following record was established during the competition:

| Date | Event | Name | Nationality | Time | Record |
|---|---|---|---|---|---|
| 13 December | Final | Kate Douglass | United States | 2:12.50 | WR |

== Results ==
=== Heats ===
The heats were started at 9:19.

| Rank | Heat | Lane | Name | Nationality | Time | Notes |
|---|---|---|---|---|---|---|
| 1 | 5 | 4 | Kate Douglass | United States | 2:16.64 | Q |
| 2 | 4 | 4 | Evgeniia Chikunova | Neutral Athletes B | 2:17.04 | Q |
| 3 | 3 | 7 | Alex Walsh | United States | 2:18.74 | Q |
| 4 | 3 | 3 | Rebecca Meder | South Africa | 2:18.79 | Q |
| 5 | 5 | 3 | Kristýna Horská | Czech Republic | 2:19.00 | Q, NR |
| 6 | 5 | 5 | Alina Zmushka | Neutral Athletes A | 2:19.19 | Q |
| 7 | 3 | 9 | Angharad Evans | Great Britain | 2:19.51 | Q |
| 8 | 4 | 3 | Clara Rybak-Andersen | Denmark | 2:19.59 | Q |
| 9 | 4 | 6 | Zhu Leiju | China | 2:19.97 | R |
| 10 | 3 | 5 | Park Si-eun | South Korea | 2:20.41 | R |
| 11 | 3 | 8 | Kotryna Teterevkova | Lithuania | 2:20.48 | NR |
| 12 | 4 | 5 | Kotomi Kato | Japan | 2:20.55 | |
| 13 | 4 | 7 | Yuliya Yefimova | Neutral Athletes B | 2:21.79 | |
| 13 | 5 | 9 | Alexanne Lepage | Canada | 2:21.79 | |
| 15 | 3 | 6 | Liu Mengyang | China | 2:21.85 | |
| 16 | 3 | 4 | Tara Kinder | Australia | 2:21.91 | |
| 17 | 4 | 9 | Ellie McCartney | Ireland | 2:23.36 | |
| 18 | 5 | 2 | Kinga Paradowska | Poland | 2:24.01 | |
| 19 | 5 | 6 | Andrea Podmaníková | Slovakia | 2:24.49 | |
| 20 | 3 | 0 | Olivia Klint Ipsa | Sweden | 2:24.60 | |
| 21 | 4 | 2 | Nikoleta Trníková | Slovakia | 2:25.16 | |
| 22 | 2 | 6 | Emily Santos | Panama | 2:25.26 | |
| 23 | 5 | 8 | Maria Romanjuk | Estonia | 2:25.30 | |
| 24 | 5 | 0 | Eszter Békési | Hungary | 2:25.60 | |
| 25 | 4 | 8 | Ko Ha-ru | South Korea | 2:25.61 | |
| 26 | 4 | 0 | Zyleika Pratt-Smith | New Zealand | 2:25.63 | |
| 27 | 5 | 7 | Ana Blažević | Croatia | 2:25.98 | |
| 28 | 4 | 1 | Brigitta Vass | Romania | 2:26.05 | |
| 29 | 2 | 4 | Macarena Ceballos | Argentina | 2:26.27 | |
| 30 | 2 | 3 | Phiangkhwan Pawapotako | Thailand | 2:26.45 | NR |
| 31 | 2 | 2 | Nàdia Tudó | Andorra | 2:29.62 | |
| 32 | 2 | 5 | Man Wui Kiu | Hong Kong | 2:30.82 | |
| 33 | 1 | 3 | Maria Erokhina | Cyprus | 2:31.31 | NR |
| 34 | 2 | 1 | Anastasia Basisto | Moldova | 2:31.37 | |
| 35 | 1 | 4 | Angelina Messina | Laos | 2:32.55 | |
| 36 | 2 | 7 | Lea Højsted | Faroe Islands | 2:33.31 | |
| 37 | 2 | 8 | Tara Al-Oul | Jordan | 2:39.05 | |
| 38 | 2 | 0 | Nicole Mack | Guatemala | 2:40.34 | |
| 39 | 2 | 9 | Maria Batallones | Northern Mariana Islands | 2:45.42 | |
| 40 | 1 | 5 | Adaya Sian Bourne | Sint Maarten | 3:04.58 | |
| | 3 | 1 | Sydney Pickrem | Canada | Did not start | |
| | 3 | 2 | Eneli Jefimova | Estonia | Did not start | |
| | 5 | 1 | Emma Carrasco | Spain | Did not start | |

=== Final ===
The final was held at 18:06.

| Rank | Lane | Name | Nationality | Time | Notes |
|---|---|---|---|---|---|
| 1st place, gold medalist(s) | 4 | Kate Douglass | United States | 2:12.50 | WR |
| 2nd place, silver medalist(s) | 5 | Evgeniia Chikunova | Neutral Athletes B | 2:15.14 | |
| 3rd place, bronze medalist(s) | 3 | Alex Walsh | United States | 2:16.83 | |
| 4 | 7 | Alina Zmushka | Neutral Athletes A | 2:17.30 | NR |
| 5 | 6 | Rebecca Meder | South Africa | 2:18.26 | |
| 6 | 2 | Kristýna Horská | Czech Republic | 2:18.31 | NR |
| 7 | 8 | Clara Rybak-Andersen | Denmark | 2:18.73 | |
| 8 | 1 | Angharad Evans | Great Britain | 2:18.77 | |
