= İsmet Güney =

Turkish Cypriot artist, cartoonist, teacher, and painter

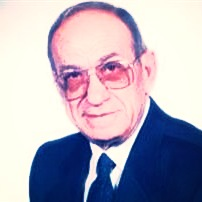
- Born: 15 July 1923; Limassol, British Cyprus
- Died: 23 June 2009 (aged 85); North Nicosia, Northern Cyprus
- Known for: Cartoonist, designer
- Notable work: Flag of Cyprus

İsmet Güney (Greek: Ισμέτ Γκιουνέι; 15 July 1923 – 23 June 2009) was a Turkish Cypriot artist, cartoonist, teacher and painter. He is best known as the designer of the modern flag of the Republic of Cyprus, the country's coat of arms and the original Cyprus lira in 1960. Güney's design was unique, as the Republic of Cyprus is the first (recognized by all nations of the world except one) country in the world to display a map on its flag.

== Biography ==
Güney was born in 1923 in Limassol, Cyprus. He began painting while he was a student in high school. After graduating from the Teachers Training College, he started working as an arts teacher in 1948.

From 1948 to 1977 he worked at Lefkoşa Erkek Lisesi teaching Art and History. In 1956, he met impressionist artist Ibrahim Çallı and worked with him until 1960.

In 1947, Güney became the first Turkish Cypriot painter to open a solo art exhibition. Güney had many solo exhibitions as well as participating in group exhibitions both in Cyprus and abroad. In 1967, a scholarship enabled him to study at Queen's University Belfast Stranmills College. In 1986 he had a grand retrospective exhibition in Nicosia. Towards the end of his life he worked on graphics and color-separation.

İsmet Güney died of cancer on 23 June 2009, at the age of 85.

== Creation of the Cyprus flag ==
Flag, ratio: 3:5, used until 2006

Before the flag of Cyprus was introduced, the flags of Turkey and Greece were used. The current flag was created as the result of a design competition in 1960. Under the constitution, the flag should not include either red or blue colors (the colours of the flag of Turkey and the flag of Greece), nor portray a cross or a crescent. All participants deliberately avoided use of these four elements in an attempt to make the flag "neutral". Thus the Greek blue and Turkish red were avoided by Güney and the other design competitors.

Güney's proposal won the contest. The design was chosen by President Makarios III with the consent of Fazil Küçük, the then-vice president, in 1960.

The white flag was chosen for the young Cyprus as a sign of peace among the two communities living there (Greek Cypriots and Turkish Cypriots). The map of the island is golden yellow, for the sake of easier reproduction of what was originally intended to be a colour of copper, a metal that the island got its name from. Most probably, since there is no brownish-reddish-copper colour in heraldry, the map was changed to golden. The two green olive branches symbolize peace between the two communities of the island.

Currently, only the government-controlled southern part of Cyprus uses Güney's original since the division of the island in 1974.

Güney sought payment from the government of the Republic of Cyprus for his flag design, in addition to compensation for its copyright use in 2006. Güney was reportedly promised £20 a year by Makarios for designing the national flag, but he was never paid for his work, according to reports by the Turkish Cypriot media. Güney had hired a Greek Cypriot law firm to take his case, and had stated that he would take his case to the European Court of Human Rights if needed.
