= List of Cypriot records in swimming =

The Cypriot records in swimming are the fastest ever performances of swimmers from Cyprus, which are recognised and ratified by the Cyprus Swimming Federation.

All records were set in finals unless noted otherwise.

== Long Course (50 m) ==
=== Men ===
| Event | Time | | Name | Club | Date | Meet | Location | Ref |
|---|---|---|---|---|---|---|---|---|
| 50 m freestyle | 22.51 | | Nikolas Antoniou | Cyprus | 2 September 2022 | World Junior Championships | Lima, Peru | |
| 100 m freestyle | 49.52 | | Nikolas Antoniou | Limassol | 22 June 2025 | Cyprian Championships | Nicosia, Cyprus | |
| 200 m freestyle | 1:50.76 | | Nikolas Antoniou | Limassol | 20 June 2025 | Cyprian Championships | Nicosia, Cyprus | |
| 400 m freestyle | 3:57.74 | | Constantinos Hadjittooulis | Cyprus | 21 July 2017 | Commonwealth Youth Games | Nassau, Bahamas | |
| 800 m freestyle | 8:23.30 | h | Constantinos Hadjittooulis | Cyprus | 25 July 2017 | World Championships | Budapest, Hungary | |
| 1500 m freestyle | 15:46.32 | | Iacovos Hadjiconstantinou | Cyprus | 28 April 2012 | Balkan Junior Championships | Kruševac, Serbia | |
| 50 m backstroke | 25.71 | | Filippos Iakovidis | Naytikos Omilos Lemesou | 28 June 2026 | Cypriot Championships | Limassol, Cyprus | |
| 100 m backstroke | 56.47 | | Filippos Iakovidis | Nicosia | 26 June 2021 | Cypriot Championships | Limassol, Cyprus | |
| 200 m backstroke | 2:05.53 | | Sebastian Konnaris | Cyprus | 26 March 2015 | Speedo Sectionals Indianapolis | Indianapolis, United States | |
| 50 m breaststroke | 27.98 | | Panayiotis Panaretos | Cyprus | 2 June 2023 | Games of the Small States of Europe | Msida, Malta | |
| 100 m breaststroke | 1:01.59 | | Panayiotis Panaretos | Cyprus | 1 June 2023 | Games of the Small States of Europe | Msida, Malta | |
| 200 m breaststroke | 2:18.07 | | Alexandros Grigoriou | Apoel | 29 June 2024 | Cyprian Championships | Limassol, Cyprus | |
| 50m butterfly | 24.32 | | Alexandre Bakhtiarov | - | 7 August 2009 | - | Athens, Greece | |
| 100m butterfly | 53.65 | | George Dovellos | Bolles School Sharks | 25 July 2025 | Futures Championships | Ocala, United States | |
| 200m butterfly | 2:03.35 | | Alexandre Bakhtiarov | - | 14 June 2009 | - | Nicosia, Cyprus | |
| 200m individual medley | 2:05.19 | h | Thomas Tsiopanis | Cyprus | 26 July 2017 | World Championships | Budapest, Hungary | |
| 400m individual medley | 4:30.92 | | Thomas Tsiopanis | Aris | 11 June 2016 | Greek Championships | Alimos, Greece | |
| 4×50m freestyle relay | 1:37.63 | | Chrysanthos Papachrysanthou; Dimitrios Dimitriou; George Oxinos; Stavros Michailidis | - | 9 May 1998 | - | Athens, Greece | |
| 4×100m freestyle relay | 3:26.88 | | Nikolas Nikolaidis; Marions Mitellas; Omiros Zagkas; Nikolas Antoniou | Limassol | 25 June 2021 | Cypriot Championships | Limassol, Cyprus | |
| 4×200m freestyle relay | 7:40.89 | | Loukas Marinos (1:55.67); Stavros Tzirtzipis (1:54.74); Christos Manoli (1:55.59); Nikolas Antoniou (1:54.89) | Cyprus | 31 May 2023 | Games of the Small States of Europe | Msida, Malta | |
| 4×50m medley relay | 1:49.97 | | Kostas Papadopoulos; Stavros Michailidis; Charalambos Panayides; Konstantinas Kleopa | - | 15 May 1994 | - | Athens, Greece | |
| 4×100m medley relay | 3:43.96 | | Filippos Iakovidis (57.38); Panayiotis Panaretos (1:02.49); Loukas Marinos (54.51); Nikolas Antoniou (49.58) | Cyprus | 1 June 2023 | Games of the Small States of Europe | Msida, Malta | |

Legend: # – Record awaiting ratification by Cyprus Swimming Federation; WR – World record; ER – European record; e – equalled existing record;
Records not set in finals: h – heat; sf – semifinal; r – relay 1st leg; rh – relay heat 1st leg; b – B final; † – en route to final mark; so – swim-off; tt – time trial

=== Women ===
| Event | Time | | Name | Club | Date | Meet | Location | Ref |
|---|---|---|---|---|---|---|---|---|
| 50m freestyle | 24.82 | sf | Kalia Antoniou | Cyprus | 14 August 2026 | European Championships | Paris, France | |
| 100m freestyle | 54.23 | | Kalia Antoniou | Cyprus | 18 June 2024 | European Championships | Belgrade, Serbia | |
| 200m freestyle | 2:00.55 | h | Anna Stylianou | Cyprus | 11 August 2008 | Olympic Games | Beijing, China | |
| 400m freestyle | 4:15.46 | h | Anna Stylianou | Cyprus | 24 July 2011 | World Championships | Shanghai, China | |
| 800m freestyle | 9:03.52 | | Anna Stylianou | - | 2 March 2012 | - | Larnaca, Cyprus | |
| 1500m freestyle | 17:39.01 | | Eirini Kyza | Iraklis | 25 July 2013 | Greek Championships | Athens, Greece | |
| 50m backstroke | 28.97 | r | Kalia Antoniou | Somateio Apoel | 20 December 2025 | Pancyprian Christmas Day Petrolina | Nicosia, Cyprus | |
| 100m backstroke | 1:03.82 | | Anna Schegoleva | - | 19 July 2009 | - | Paphos, Cyprus | |
| 200m backstroke | 2:21.04 | | Anna Schegoleva | - | 4 July 2014 | - | Limassol, Cyprus | |
| 50m breaststroke | 31.12 | | Anastasia Christoforou | Cyprus | 1 July 2009 | Mediterranean Games | Pescara, Italy | |
| 100m breaststroke | 1:08.52 | | Maria Erokhina | Naytikos Omilos Lemesou | 26 June 2026 | Cypriot Championships | Limassol, Cyprus | |
| 200m breaststroke | 2:28.92 | | Maria Erokhina | Naytikos Omilos Lemesou | 27 June 2026 | Cypriot Championships | Limassol, Cyprus | |
| 50m butterfly | 26.41 | | Kalia Antoniou | Cyprus | 22 August 2026 | Mediterranean Games | Taranto, Italy | |
| 100m butterfly | 1:00.33 | = | Anna Schegoleva | - | 8 August 2009 | - | Athens, Greece | |
| 100m butterfly | 1:00.33 | = | Alexandra Schegoleva | Cyprus | 25 March 2018 | Multinations Junior Meet | Graz, Australia | |
| 200m butterfly | 2:15.08 | | Anna Schegoleva | - | 6 August 2009 | - | Athens, Greece | |
| 200m individual medley | 2:19.08 | | Alexandra Schegoleva | Farnagusta Nautical Club | 27 June 2019 | Cypriot Championships | Limassol, Cyprus | |
| 400m individual medley | 5:00.44 | | Eleni Stefanidou | - | 2 June 2017 | Games of the Small States of Europe | Serravalle, San Marino | |
| 4×100m freestyle relay | 3:50.99 | | Christina Agiomamitou; Anna Hadjiloizou; Chrysoula Karamanou (59.93); Kalia Antoniou (55.02) | Cyprus | 30 May 2023 | Games of the Small States of Europe | Msida, Malta | |
| 4×200m freestyle relay | 8:39.16 | | Rania Pavlou (2:13.16); Anna Schegoleva (2:08.18); Marilena Georgiou (2:11.74); Anna Stylianou (2:06.08) | Cyprus | 3 June 2009 | Games of the Small States of Europe | Limassol, Cyprus | |
| 4×100m medley relay | 4:15.98 | | Maria Panaretou (1:08.35); Maria Erokhina (1:11.01); Anna Hadjiloizou (1:02.16); Kalia Antoniou (54.46) | Cyprus | 1 June 2023 | Games of the Small States of Europe | Msida, Malta | |

Legend: # – Record awaiting ratification by Cyprus Swimming Federation; WR – World record; ER – European record; e – equalled existing record;
Records not set in finals: h – heat; sf – semifinal; r – relay 1st leg; rh – relay heat 1st leg; b – B final; † – en route to final mark; so – swim-off; tt – time trial

=== Mixed relay ===
| Event | Time | Name | Club | Date | Meet | Location | Ref |
|---|---|---|---|---|---|---|---|
| 4×100 m freestyle relay | 3:30.73 | Nikolas Antoniou (49.62); Nikolas Kosta (50.79); Kalia Antoniou (54.47); Anna Hadjiloizou (55.85) | Cyprus | 21 July 2025 | World University Games | Berlin, Germany | |
| 4×100 m medley relay | 4:05.36 | Alexis Iacovides (57.91); Maria Erokhina (1:12.31); Loukas Marinos (56.00); Christina Agiomamitou (59.14) | Cyprus | 30 May 2025 | Games of the Small States of Europe | Andorra la Vella, Andorra | |

Legend: # – Record awaiting ratification by Cyprus Swimming Federation; WR – World record; ER – European record; e – equalled existing record;
Records not set in finals: h – heat; sf – semifinal; r – relay 1st leg; rh – relay heat 1st leg; b – B final; † – en route to final mark; so – swim-off; tt – time trial

== Short Course (25 m) ==
=== Men ===
| Event | Time | | Name | Club | Date | Meet | Location | Ref |
|---|---|---|---|---|---|---|---|---|
| 50m freestyle | 22.33 | h | Nikolas Antoniou | Cyprus | 18 December 2021 | World Championships | Abu Dhabi, United Arab Emirates | |
| 100m freestyle | 49.15 | h | Nikolas Antoniou | Cyprus | 20 December 2021 | World Championships | Abu Dhabi, United Arab Emirates | |
| 200m freestyle | 1:51.25 | h | Christos Manoli | University of Manchester | 14 November 2025 | BUCS Championships | Sheffield, Great Britain | |
| 400m freestyle | 4:00.82 | h | Kyriacos Andrea Papa Adams | Thanet Swim | 28 February 2015 | Kent County Championships | Gillingham, Great Britain | |
| 800m freestyle | 8:23.47 | † | Nicolas Ioannides | Cyprus | 31 December 2016 | Israeli Winter Championships | Netanya, Israel | |
| 1500m freestyle | 15:50.31 | | Nicolas Ioannides | Cyprus | 31 December 2016 | Israeli Winter Championships | Netanya, Israel | |
| 50m backstroke | 25.17 | h | Filippos Iakovidis | Cyprus | 18 December 2021 | World Championships | Abu Dhabi, United Arab Emirates | |
| 100m backstroke | 55.00 | h | Filippos Iakovidis | Cyprus | 16 December 2021 | World Championships | Abu Dhabi, United Arab Emirates | |
| 200m backstroke | 2:03.00 | | Sebastian Konnaris | - | 27 December 2013 | - | Haifa, Israel | |
| 50 m breaststroke | 27.14 | | Panayiotis Panaretos | Swansea | 14 November 2025 | BUCS Championships | Sheffield, United Kingdom | |
| 100 m breaststroke | 59.57 | | Panayiotis Panaretos | Swansea | 21 November 2021 | BUCS Championships | Sheffield, United Kingdom | |
| 200 m breaststroke | 2:14.40 | h | Alexandros Grigoriou | Cyprus | 13 December 2024 | World Championships | Budapest, Hungary | |
| 50 m butterfly | 24.08 | h | Alexandre Bakhtiarov | Cyprus | 13 December 2009 | European Championships | Istanbul, Turkey | |
| 100 m butterfly | 54.01 | h | Alexandre Bakhtiarov | Cyprus | 8 December 2011 | European Championships | Szczecin, Poland | |
| 200 m butterfly | 2:05.86 | h | Christos Manoli | University of Manchester | 16 November 2025 | BUCS Championships | Sheffield, United Kingdom | |
| 100m individual medley | 56.33 | h | Thomas Tsiopanis | Cyprus | 16 December 2017 | European Championships | Copenhagen, Denmark | |
| 200m individual medley | 2:02.05 | h | Thomas Tsiopanis | Cyprus | 15 December 2017 | European Championships | Copenhagen, Denmark | |
| 400m individual medley | 4:21.19 | | Thomas Tsiopanis | University of Bath SC | 16 December 2016 | ASA Winter Meet | Sheffield, Great Britain | |
| 4×50m freestyle relay | 1:35.25 | | Chrysanthos Papachrysanthou; Nikolas Papachrysanthou; Christoforos Skourides; Georgios Mylonas | - | 4 May 2007 | - | Larnaca, Cyprus | |
| 4×100m freestyle relay | 3:46.20 | | Sebastian Konnaris; Andreas Efstathiou; Lefkios Xanthou; Zacharias Raptopoulos | - | 6 March 2010 | - | Germany | |
| 4×200m freestyle relay | | | | | | | | |
| 4×50m medley relay | 1:47.31 | | Sebastian Konnaris; Lefkios Xanthou; Adamos Zavallis; Neoptolemos Papadiofantous | - | 20 October 2013 | - | | |
| 4×100m medley relay | 4:10.80 | | Sebastian Konnaris; Lefkios Xanthou; Manolis Timotheou; Zacharias Raptopoulos | - | 6 March 2010 | - | Germany | |

Legend: # – Record awaiting ratification by Cyprus Swimming Federation; WR – World record; ER – European record; e – equalled existing record;
Records not set in finals: h – heat; sf – semifinal; r – relay 1st leg; rh – relay heat 1st leg; b – B final; † – en route to final mark; so – swim-off; tt – time trial

=== Women ===
| Event | Time | | Name | Club | Date | Meet | Location | Ref |
|---|---|---|---|---|---|---|---|---|
| 50 m freestyle | 23.99 | sf | Kalia Antoniou | Cyprus | 6 December 2025 | European Championships | Lublin, Poland | |
| 100 m freestyle | 52.68 | h | Kalia Antoniou | Alabama | 31 October 2026 | World Championship Trials | Westmont, United States | |
| 200 m freestyle | 2:01.48 | | Anna Stylianou | Olympiacos | 19 December 2009 | Christmas Grand Prix | Agrinio, Greece | |
| 400 m freestyle | 4:26.18 | | Anna Stylianou | - | 18 November 2007 | - | Athens, Greece | |
| 800 m freestyle | 9:04.31 | | Natalie Roubina | - | 4 December 1999 | - | Thessaloniki, Greece | |
| 1500 m freestyle | 18:18.96 | | Nicole Mikellides | Es Nanterre | 16 March 2019 | Championnat Départemental Printemps | Boulogne-Billancourt, France | |
| 50m backstroke | 26.82 | h | Kalia Antoniou | Alabama | 29 October 2026 | World Championship Trials | Westmont, United States | |
| 100m backstroke | 1:01.02 | h | Anna Schegoleva | Cyprus | 3 December 2014 | World Championships | Doha, Qatar | |
| 200m backstroke | 2:22.06 | | Sofia Papadopoulou | - | 7 November 2015 | - | Germany | |
| 50m breaststroke | 30.83 | sf | Anastasia Christoforou | Cyprus | 10 December 2009 | European Championships | Istanbul, Turkey | |
| 100m breaststroke | 1:09.49 | h | Maria Erokhina | Cyprus | 11 December 2024 | World Championships | Budapest, Hungary | |
| 200m breaststroke | 2:31.31 | h | Maria Erokhina | Cyprus | 13 December 2024 (Note: by official result source; 14 December 2024 by Cyprus Federation source, a typo) | World Championships | Budapest, Hungary | |
| 50m butterfly | 25.70 | h | Kalia Antoniou | Cyprus | 2 December 2025 | European Championships | Lublin, Poland | |
| 100m butterfly | 59.97 | sf | Maria Papadopoulou | Cyprus | 13 December 2003 | European Championships | Dublin, Ireland | |
| 200m butterfly | 2:15.02 | | Maria Papadopoulou | - | 5 December 1999 | - | United States | |
| 100m individual medley | 1:03.43 | | Anna Schegoleva | - | 18 October 2009 | - | Larnaca, Cyprus | |
| 200m individual medley | 2:23.20 | | Natalie Roubina | - | 19 March 2000 | - | Athens, Greece | |
| 400m individual medley | 5:07.21 | | Natalie Roubina | - | 14 December 2002 | - | Larnaca, Cyprus | |
| 4×50m freestyle relay | 1:49.79 | | Anastasia Christoforou; Maria Papadopoulou; Eleni Pratsi; Anna Schegoleva | - | 19 November 2010 | - | Larnaca, Cyprus | |
| 4×100m freestyle relay | 4:04.80 | | | - | 31 January 1999 | - | Serres, Greece | |
| 4×200m freestyle relay | | | | | | | | |
| 4×50m medley relay | 2:01.91 | | Anna Schegoleva; Anastasia Christoforou; Victoria Sofokleous; Rania Pavlou | - | 18 October 2009 | - | Larnaca, Cyprus | |
| 4×100m medley relay | 4:51.40 | | Sofia Papadopoulou; Panayiota Georgiou; Olia Antoniou; Ifigenia Kombou | - | 6 March 2010 | - | Germany | |

Legend: # – Record awaiting ratification by Cyprus Swimming Federation; WR – World record; ER – European record; e – equalled existing record;
Records not set in finals: h – heat; sf – semifinal; r – relay 1st leg; rh – relay heat 1st leg; b – B final; † – en route to final mark; so – swim-off; tt – time trial
