= Swimming at the 2020 European Aquatics Championships – Women's 50 metre freestyle =

Women's 50 metre freestyle at the 2020 European Aquatics Championships
- Venue: Danube Arena
- Dates: 17 May 2021 (heats and semifinals); 18 May 2021 (final)
- Competitors: 62 from 33 nations
- Winning time: 23.97

Medalists
gold medal	Ranomi Kromowidjojo	Netherlands
silver medal	Pernille Blume	Denmark
silver medal	Katarzyna Wasick	Poland

The Women's 50 metre freestyle competition of the 2020 European Aquatics Championships was held on 17 and 18 May 2021.

== Records ==
Before the competition, the existing world, European and championship records were as follows.

	Name	Nationality	Time	Location	Date
World record European record	Sarah Sjöström	Sweden	23.67	Budapest	29 July 2017
Championship record	Sarah Sjöström	Sweden	23.74	Glasgow	4 August 2018

== Results ==
=== Heats ===
The heats were started on 17 May at 10:42.

Rank	Heat	Lane	Name	Nationality	Time	Notes
1	6	4	Ranomi Kromowidjojo	Netherlands	24.24	Q
2	7	4	Pernille Blume	Denmark	24.42	Q
3	5	4	Maria Kameneva	Russia	24.47	Q
4	6	5	Femke Heemskerk	Netherlands	24.51	Q
4	6	3	Katarzyna Wasick	Poland	24.51	Q, NR
6	7	5	Michelle Coleman	Sweden	24.77	Q
7	5	5	Anna Hopkin	Great Britain	24.78	Q
8	5	3	Kim Busch	Netherlands	24.85	
9	6	2	Fanny Teijonsalo	Finland	24.86	Q, NR
10	7	3	Mélanie Henique	France	24.89	Q
11	7	6	Julie Kepp Jensen	Denmark	24.92	Q
12	5	1	Barbora Seemanová	Czech Republic	24.93	Q, NR
13	4	1	Petra Senánszky	Hungary	24.99	Q
14	6	6	Lidón Muñoz	Spain	25.01	Q
15	7	1	Neža Klančar	Slovenia	25.07	Q, NR
16	7	2	Jessica Felsner	Germany	25.09	Q
17	5	6	Silvia Di Pietro	Italy	25.22	Q
18	5	2	Costanza Cocconcelli	Italy	25.30	
19	6	7	Andrea Murez	Israel	25.35	
20	7	8	Theodora Drakou	Greece	25.42	
20	6	1	Nina Stanisavljević	Serbia	25.42	
22	5	7	Jessica Steiger	Germany	25.47	
23	3	5	Teresa Ivanová	Slovakia	25.48	
24	5	8	Nastassia Karakouskaya	Belarus	25.50	
25	6	0	Kalia Antoniou	Cyprus	25.52	
26	4	5	Anna Kolářová	Czech Republic	25.53	
26	6	8	Chiara Tarantino	Italy	25.53	
28	4	9	Janja Šegel	Slovenia	25.56	
29	7	9	Kornelia Fiedkiewicz	Poland	25.59	
29	7	7	Nina Kost	Switzerland	25.59	
31	4	3	Mimosa Jallow	Finland	25.60	
32	5	0	Nina Gangl	Austria	25.61	
33	4	4	Selen Özbilen	Turkey	25.64	
34	7	0	Evelyn Davis	Great Britain	25.72	
35	4	7	Diana Petkova	Bulgaria	25.76	
36	3	1	Aleksa Gold	Estonia	25.80	
37	3	6	Beatrix Bordás	Hungary	25.83	
37	5	9	Zohar Shikler	Israel	25.83	
39	4	6	Emma Russell	Great Britain	25.85	
40	3	3	Gabriela Ņikitina	Latvia	25.88	
41	3	4	Alma Thormalm	Sweden	25.96	
42	4	8	Maria-Thaleia Drasidou	Greece	25.98	
43	4	0	Lena Kreundl	Austria	26.01	
43	3	2	Tanja Popović	Serbia	26.01	
45	4	2	İlknur Nihan Çakıcı	Turkey	26.07	
46	6	9	Bianca Costea	Romania	26.13	
47	3	7	Jóhanna Guðmundsdóttir	Iceland	26.18	
48	1	5	Maria Romanjuk	Estonia	26.31	
49	2	4	Mónika Ollé	Hungary	26.38	
50	3	9	Ida Hulkko	Finland	26.44	
51	3	0	Mia Blazevska Eminova	North Macedonia	26.64	
52	2	5	Nicola Muscat	Malta	26.84	
53	3	8	Steingerður Hauksdóttir	Iceland	26.98	
54	2	6	Laura Bernat	Poland	27.18	
55	2	7	Siiri Einiö	Finland	27.20	
56	2	2	Eneli Jefimova	Estonia	27.38	
57	2	1	Varsenik Manucharyan	Armenia	27.59	
58	2	3	Mónica Ramírez	Andorra	27.61	
59	2	0	Nàdia Tudó	Andorra	27.76	
60	2	8	Ani Poghosyan	Armenia	28.01	
61	1	4	Eda Zeqiri	Kosovo	29.16	
62	1	3	Jona Macula	Kosovo	30.22	

=== Semifinals ===
The semifinals were held on 17 May at 18:17.

==== Semifinal 1 ====
Rank	Lane	Name	Nationality	Time	Notes
1	4	Pernille Blume	Denmark	24.06	Q
2	5	Femke Heemskerk	Netherlands	24.41	Q
3	3	Michelle Coleman	Sweden	24.54	q
4	2	Julie Kepp Jensen	Denmark	24.76	
5	6	Fanny Teijonsalo	Finland	24.81	NR
6	1	Neža Klančar	Slovenia	24.96	NR
7	7	Petra Senánszky	Hungary	24.97	
8	8	Silvia Di Pietro	Italy	25.14	

==== Semifinal 2 ====
Rank	Lane	Name	Nationality	Time	Notes
1	4	Ranomi Kromowidjojo	Netherlands	24.14	Q
2	3	Katarzyna Wasick	Poland	24.34	Q, NR
3	5	Maria Kameneva	Russia	24.40	q
4	6	Anna Hopkin	Great Britain	24.66	q
5	7	Barbora Seemanová	Czech Republic	24.69	q, NR
6	1	Lidón Muñoz	Spain	24.90	
7	2	Mélanie Henique	France	25.08	
8	8	Jessica Felsner	Germany	25.14	

=== Final ===
The final was held on 18 May at 19:22.

Rank	Lane	Name	Nationality	Time	Notes
1st place, gold medalist(s)	5	Ranomi Kromowidjojo	Netherlands	23.97	
2nd place, silver medalist(s)	4	Pernille Blume	Denmark	24.17	
2nd place, silver medalist(s)	3	Katarzyna Wasick	Poland	24.17	NR
4	6	Maria Kameneva	Russia	24.29	
5	2	Femke Heemskerk	Netherlands	24.32	
6	1	Anna Hopkin	Great Britain	24.51	
7	7	Michelle Coleman	Sweden	24.65	
8	8	Barbora Seemanová	Czech Republic	24.67	NR
