= Katarzyna Wasick =

Polish swimmer (born 1992)

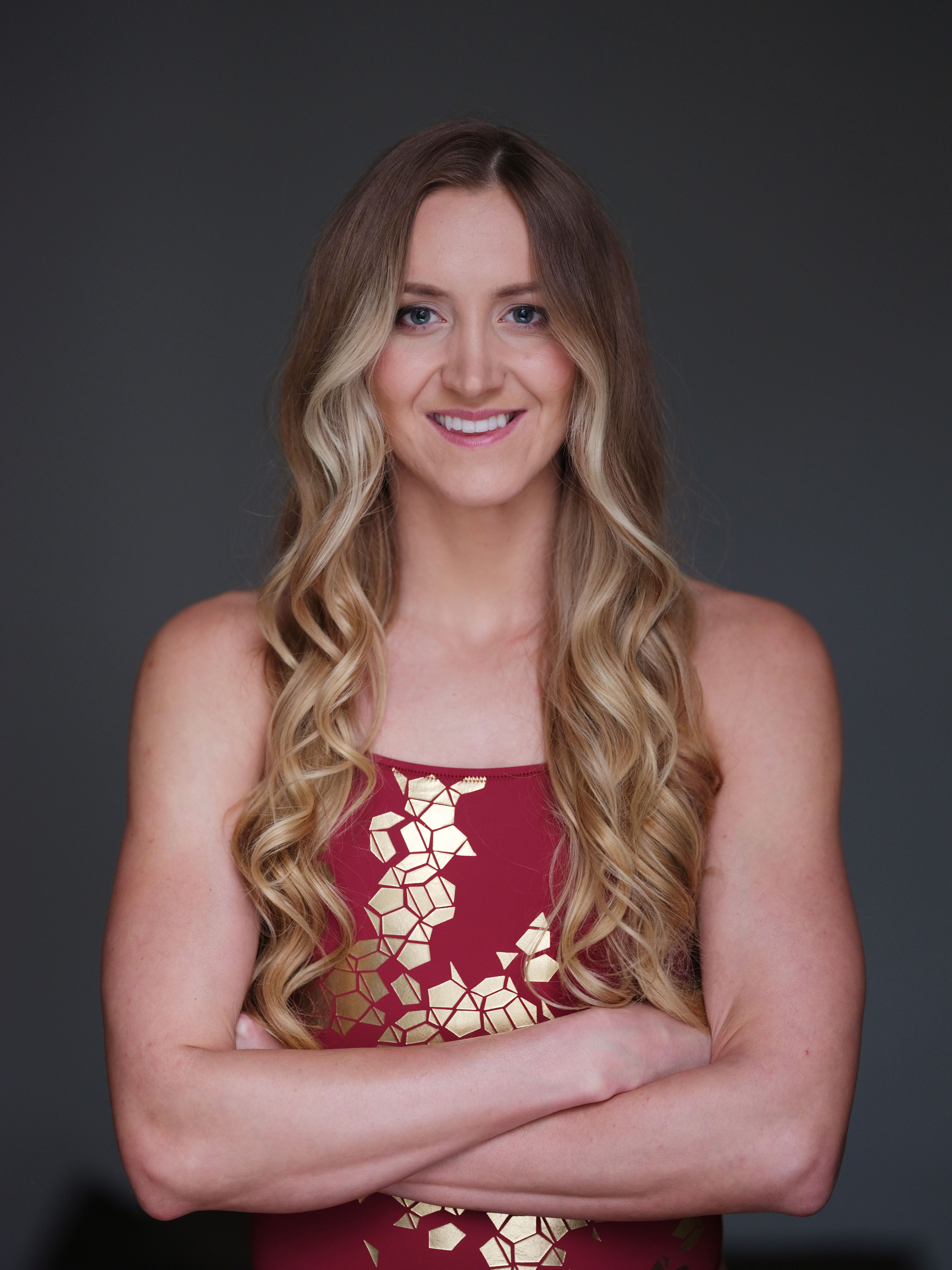
- Wasick in 2019

Personal information
- Full name: Katarzyna Maria Wasick
- Nickname: Kasia
- Nationality: Polish
- Born: 22 March 1992 (age 34) Kraków, Poland
- Height: 1.78 m (5 ft 10 in)
- Weight: 64 kg (141 lb)

Sport
- Sport: Swimming
- Strokes: Freestyle
- Club: AZS AWF Katowice
- College team: University of Southern California
Medal record
Women's swimming
Representing Poland
World Championships (LC)
Silver medal – second place	2022 Budapest	50 m freestyle
Bronze medal – third place	2024 Doha	50 m freestyle
World Championships (SC)
Silver medal – second place	2022 Melbourne	50 m freestyle
Bronze medal – third place	2021 Abu Dhabi	50 m freestyle
Bronze medal – third place	2024 Budapest	50 m freestyle
Bronze medal – third place	2024 Budapest	4×50 m mixed freestyle
European Championships (LC)
Gold medal – first place	2026 Paris	50 m freestyle
Silver medal – second place	2020 Budapest	50 m freestyle
Silver medal – second place	2022 Rome	50 m freestyle
European Championships (SC)
Gold medal – first place	2019 Glasgow	4×50 m medley
Gold medal – first place	2025 Lublin	50 m freestyle
Silver medal – second place	2021 Kazan	50 m freestyle
Silver medal – second place	2021 Kazan	100 m freestyle
Bronze medal – third place	2011 Szczecin	4×50 m medley
Bronze medal – third place	2021 Kazan	4×50 m freestyle
Bronze medal – third place	2021 Kazan	4×50 m mixed freestyle
Bronze medal – third place	2025 Lublin	4×50 m freestyle
Bronze medal – third place	2025 Lublin	4×50 m mixed medley

Katarzyna Maria "Kasia" Wasick (née Wilk; 22 March 1992) is a Polish competitive swimmer who specializes in sprint freestyle. Wasick represented Poland at the 2008, 2012, 2016, 2020, 2024 Summer Olympic Games in Beijing, London, Rio de Janeiro, Tokyo and Paris as well as other international meets. She is the fastest female swimmer in Poland holding national records in the 50 and 100 freestyle (short course & long course).

== Career ==
After graduating from high school, Wasick trained in Poland with her brother Robert Wilk at the AZS AWF Katowice swim club before the 2012 Olympics in London. After the Olympic Games she went on to study at the University of Southern California where she swam for coach Dave Salo for four years. Wasick has shown great individual scoring ability while lending a strong hand on relays. She's a twelve-time All-American and has scored four times individually at the NCAA Championships and is a six-time career Pac-12 finalist. At the 2016 NCAA Championships, she posted career bests with a third in the 100y freestyle. She also led off USC's first place 400y free relay that set a school record.

After the 2016 Olympics in Rio de Janeiro she retired from swimming due to shoulder injury. In 2018 she made a comeback to competitive swimming, first starting with the Las Vegas Masters team. She holds two American masters records in the 50 and 100 freestyle (25-29 age group short course yards records). Later in 2018 she joined the University of Nevada, Las Vegas Pro Group coached by Ben Loorz and Patrick Ota.

At the 2020 Olympic Games in Tokyo, Japan held in 2021 due to the COVID-19 pandemic, Wasick placed 5th in the 50m freestyle final. Later that year she won silver medals in the 50m and 100m freestyle as well as bronze medals in the 4x50 m freestyle relay and 4x50m mixed freestyle relay at the 2021 European Short Course Swimming Championships in Kazan, Russia. She finished the year earning a bronze medal in 50m freestyle at the 2021 World Short Course Swimming Championships in Abu Dhabi, United Arab Emirates in December.

In 2022, she won the silver medal in the 50m freestyle at the 2022 World Aquatics Championships in Budapest becoming the second Polish female swimmer, after Otylia Jędrzejczak, to win a long course world championship medal.

== International Swimming League ==
=== 2019 ===
Wasick competed for the Cali Condors in the inaugural season of International Swimming League and reached the finals at Mandalay Bay in Las Vegas. Kasia Wasick swam for the New York Breakers and reached the semi-final. She won three times in the 50 m freestyle at the Solidarity Camp in Budapest. She was drafted to compete for Toronto Titans as their first pick in the draft.

== Personal life ==
Her father, Zbigniew Wilk, is a former boxer. Kasia has three siblings, two elder brothers who also practice swimming and a sister who competed in track and field. She says her brothers inspired and motivated her to take up swimming. She received a bachelor's degree in psychology from the University of Southern California. She currently lives with her husband, Matthew Wasick, in Las Vegas.

== See also ==
- Poland at the Olympics
- List of Polish swimmers
