= Swimming at the 2024 European Aquatics Championships – Women's 200 metre breaststroke =

Women's 200 metre breaststroke at the 2024 European Aquatics Championships
- Venue: Sports Centre Milan Gale Muškatirović
- Dates: 20 June (heats and semifinals); 21 June (final)
- Winning time: 2:23.60

Medalists
gold medal	Kristýna Horská	Czech Republic
silver medal	Clara Rybak-Andersen	Denmark
bronze medal	Lisa Mamié	Switzerland

The Women's 200 metre breaststroke competition of the 2024 European Aquatics Championships was held on 20 and 21 June 2024.

== Records ==
Prior to the competition, the existing world, European and championship records were as follows.

	Name	Nation	Time	Location	Date
World record	Evgeniia Chikunova	Russia	2:17.55	Kazan	21 April 2023
European record	Rikke Pedersen	Denmark	2:19.11	Barcelona	1 August 2013
Championship record	Rikke Pedersen	Denmark	2:19.84	Berlin	22 August 2014

== Results ==
=== Heats ===
The heats were started on 20 June at 10:16.
Qualification Rules: The 16 fastest from the heats qualify to semifinals.

Rank	Heat	Lane	Name	Nationality	Time	Notes
1	2	4	Kristýna Horská	Czech Republic	2:27.45	Q
2	3	4	Thea Blomsterberg	Denmark	2:28.08	Q
=3	1	4	Clara Rybak-Andersen	Denmark	2:28.31	Q
=3	1	6	Nikoleta Trníková	Slovakia	2:28.31	Q
5	1	2	Ellie McCartney	Ireland	2:28.63	Q
6	3	3	Eneli Jefimova	Estonia	2:28.93	Q
7	2	6	Eleni Kontogeorgou	Greece	2:29.08	Q
8	3	5	Lisa Mamié	Switzerland	2:29.67	Q
9	2	5	Ana Blažević	Croatia	2:29.90	Q
10	1	7	Niamh Coyne	Ireland	2:29.99	Q
11	1	3	Eszter Békési	Hungary	2:30.63	Q
12	2	1	Laura Lahtinen	Finland	2:30.84	Q
13	3	7	Lisa Nystrand	Sweden	2:31.22	Q
14	3	2	Maria Romanjuk	Estonia	2:31.31	Q
15	3	8	Chara Angelaki	Greece	2:31.64	Q
16	1	5	Grace Palmer	Belgium	2:32.51	Q
17	3	1	Emelie Fast	Sweden	2:32.76	
18	3	6	Andrea Podmaníková	Slovakia	2:32.78	
19	2	8	Nadia Tudo	Andorra	2:33.74	
20	2	2	Martina Bukvić	Serbia	2:34.41	
21	1	8	Anna Munk Fuglsang	Denmark	2:37.89	
	1	1	Klara Thormalm	Sweden	Did not start	
	2	3	Olivia Klint Ipsa	Sweden	Did not start	
	2	7	Ida Hulkko	Finland	Did not start	

=== Semifinals ===
The semifinals were started on 20 June at 19:07.
Qualification Rules: The 8 fastest from the heats qualify to the final.

Rank	Heat	Lane	Name	Nationality	Time	Notes
1	2	4	Kristýna Horská	Czech Republic	2:24.55	Q
2	1	4	Thea Blomsterberg	Denmark	2:25.04	Q
3	2	5	Clara Rybak-Andersen	Denmark	2:26.18	Q
4	2	6	Lisa Mamié	Switzerland	2:26.34	Q
5	2	3	Ellie McCartney	Ireland	2:26.76	Q
6	1	2	Eszter Békési	Hungary	2:27.77	Q
7	1	3	Eleni Kontogeorgou	Greece	2:28.14	Q
8	1	6	Ana Blažević	Croatia	2:28.92	Q
9	1	5	Nikoleta Trníková	Slovakia	2:28.96	
10	2	1	Maria Romanjuk	Estonia	2:30.03	
11	2	7	Laura Lahtinen	Finland	2:30.11	
12	2	2	Niamh Coyne	Ireland	2:30.47	
13	1	8	Andrea Podmaníková	Slovakia	2:30.66	
14	2	8	Grace Palmer	Belgium	2:32.01	
15	1	1	Chara Angelaki	Greece	2:32.79	
16	1	7	Lisa Nystrand	Sweden	2:33.18	

=== Final ===
The final was held on 21 June at 18:43.

Rank	Lane	Name	Nationality	Time	Notes
1st place, gold medalist(s)	4	Kristýna Horská	Czech Republic	2:23.60	
2nd place, silver medalist(s)	3	Clara Rybak-Andersen	Denmark	2:25.20	
3rd place, bronze medalist(s)	6	Lisa Mamié	Switzerland	2:26.10	
4	5	Thea Blomsterberg	Denmark	2:26.42	
5	7	Eszter Békési	Hungary	2:27.72	
6	1	Eleni Kontogeorgou	Greece	2:28.20	
7	8	Ana Blažević	Croatia	2:28.44	
8	2	Ellie McCartney	Ireland	2:28.68	
