= Fanny Teijonsalo =

Finnish swimmer (born 1996)

Personal information
- Nationality: Finnish
- Born: 6 February 1996 (age 30)

Sport
- Sport: Swimming
- College team: Florida Gulf Coast University (2015–2017); Arizona State University (2017–2019)

Fanny Teijonsalo (born 6 February 1996) is a Finnish swimmer. She competed in the women's 50 metre freestyle event at the 2020 European Aquatics Championships, in Budapest, Hungary, reaching the semi-finals.
