= Swimming at the 2026 European Aquatics Championships – Women's 50 metre freestyle =

Women's 50 metre freestyle at the 2026 European Aquatics Championships
- Venue: Paris Aquatic Centre
- Dates: 14 August (heats and semifinals); 15 August (final)
- Competitors: 51 from 31 nations
- Winning time: 23.84

Medalists
| gold medal | Katarzyna Wasick | Poland |
| silver medal | Sarah Sjöström | Sweden |
| bronze medal | Sara Curtis | Italy |

The Women's 50 metre freestyle competition of the 2026 European Aquatics Championships was held on 14 and 15 August 2026.

== Records ==
Prior to the competition, the existing world, European and championship records were as follows.

| | Name | Nationality | Time | Location | Date |
|---|---|---|---|---|---|
| World record | Gretchen Walsh | United States | 23.55 | Rome | 28 June 2026 |
| European record | Sarah Sjöström | Sweden | 23.61 | Fukuoka | 29 July 2023 |
| Championship record | Sarah Sjöström | Sweden | 23.74 | Glasgow | 4 August 2018 |

== Results ==
=== Heats ===
The heats were started on 14 August at 09:30.
Qualification Rules: The 16 fastest from the heats qualify to the semifinals.

| Rank | Heat | Lane | Name | Nationality | Time | Notes |
|---|---|---|---|---|---|---|
| 1 | 5 | 5 | Milou van Wijk | Netherlands | 24.13 | Q |
| 2 | 6 | 4 | Sarah Sjöström | Sweden | 24.21 | Q |
| 3 | 4 | 4 | Sara Curtis | Italy | 24.33 | Q |
| 4 | 5 | 4 | Marrit Steenbergen | Netherlands | 24.34 | Q |
| 5 | 6 | 5 | Katarzyna Wasick | Poland | 24.39 | Q |
| 6 | 6 | 3 | Béryl Gastaldello | France | 24.65 | Q |
| 7 | 6 | 1 | Neža Klančar | Slovenia | 24.70 | Q |
| 8 | 5 | 1 | Petra Senánszky | Hungary | 24.71 | Q |
| 9 | 6 | 6 | Valerie van Roon | Netherlands | 24.73 | |
| 10 | 4 | 3 | Arina Surkova | Neutral Athletes B | 24.75 | Q |
| 11 | 6 | 7 | Tessa Giele | Netherlands | 24.85 | |
| 12 | 6 | 2 | Lillian Slušná | Slovakia | 24.92 | Q |
| 13 | 5 | 3 | Theodora Taylor | Great Britain | 24.93 | Q |
| 14 | 5 | 7 | Silvia Di Pietro | Italy | 24.94 | Q |
| 15 | 4 | 5 | Florine Gaspard | Belgium | 25.00 | Q |
| 16 | 4 | 0 | Julianna Dora Bocska | Germany | 25.03 | Q |
| 17 | 5 | 6 | Analia Pigrée | France | 25.04 | Q |
| 18 | 4 | 1 | Elena Capretta | Italy | 25.08 | |
| 18 | 5 | 8 | Kalia Antoniou | Cyprus | 25.08 | Q |
| 20 | 4 | 7 | Barbora Janíčková | Czech Republic | 25.13 | |
| 20 | 6 | 8 | Marie Wattel | France | 25.13 | |
| 22 | 4 | 2 | Aleksandra Kuznetsova | Neutral Athletes B | 25.16 | |
| 23 | 4 | 6 | Julie Kepp Jensen | Denmark | 25.23 | |
| 24 | 3 | 3 | Sofia Åstedt | Sweden | 25.33 | |
| 25 | 5 | 0 | Martine Damborg | Denmark | 25.37 | |
| 26 | 3 | 5 | Sara Junevik | Sweden | 25.38 | |
| 27 | 3 | 1 | Diana Petkova | Bulgaria | 25.40 | |
| 28 | 2 | 6 | Anna Avgousta Vlachou | Greece | 25.49 | |
| 28 | 3 | 4 | Daryna Nabojčenko | Czech Republic | 25.49 | |
| 30 | 3 | 0 | Rosalie Phelan | Ireland | 25.55 | |
| 30 | 6 | 9 | Nina Jazy | Germany | 25.55 | |
| 32 | 2 | 4 | Jóhanna Elín Guðmundsdóttir | Iceland | 25.66 | |
| 33 | 3 | 7 | Laura Lahtinen | Finland | 25.77 | |
| 34 | 4 | 9 | Louise Hansson | Sweden | 25.78 | |
| 35 | 4 | 8 | Kornelia Fiedkiewicz | Poland | 25.81 | |
| 36 | 3 | 9 | Hedda Øritsland | Norway | 25.83 | |
| 37 | 5 | 9 | Nina Stanisavljević | Serbia | 25.91 | |
| 38 | 3 | 2 | Daria Golovaty | Israel | 25.94 | |
| 39 | 3 | 6 | Barbora Mileišytė | Lithuania | 25.98 | |
| 40 | 2 | 5 | Ana Pinho Rodrigues | Portugal | 26.00 | |
| 41 | 3 | 8 | Sandra Maria Balto | Norway | 26.11 | |
| 42 | 2 | 1 | Kiia Metsakonkola | Finland | 26.28 | |
| 43 | 1 | 5 | Marlene Kahler | Austria | 26.53 | |
| 44 | 1 | 3 | Varsenik Manucharyan | Armenia | 26.63 | |
| 45 | 2 | 0 | Jovana Kuljaca | Montenegro | 26.70 | |
| 46 | 2 | 8 | Egle Salu | Estonia | 26.79 | |
| 47 | 2 | 7 | Vala Dis Cicero | Iceland | 26.82 | |
| 48 | 2 | 2 | Fia Stenman | Finland | 26.91 | |
| 49 | 2 | 6 | Milania Gunko | Armenia | 27.45 | |
| 50 | 1 | 4 | Riga Shala | Kosovo | 28.03 | |
| 51 | 2 | 9 | Stella Gjoka | Albania | 28.37 | |
| | 6 | 0 | Emma Virginia Menicucci | Italy | Did not start | |
| | 5 | 2 | Mary-Ambre Moluh | France | Did not start | |

=== Semifinals ===
The semifinals were started on 14 August at 19:18.
Qualification Rules: The first 2 competitors of each semifinal and the remaining fastest (up to a total of 8 qualified competitors) from the semifinals advance to the final.<

| Rank | Heat | Lane | Name | Nationality | Time | Notes |
|---|---|---|---|---|---|---|
| 1 | 1 | 4 | Sarah Sjöström | Sweden | 23.83 | Q |
| 2 | 2 | 4 | Milou van Wijk | Netherlands | 24.07 | Q |
| 3 | 2 | 3 | Katarzyna Wasick | Poland | 24.08 | Q |
| 4 | 2 | 5 | Sara Curtis | Italy | 24.13 | Q |
| 5 | 1 | 5 | Marrit Steenbergen | Netherlands | 24.29 | Q |
| 6 | 1 | 3 | Béryl Gastaldello | France | 24.54 | Q |
| 7 | 2 | 2 | Arina Surkova | Neutral Athletes B | 24.63 | Q |
| 8 | 2 | 6 | Neža Klančar | Slovenia | 24.69 | Q |
| 9 | 1 | 6 | Petra Senánszky | Hungary | 24.73 | |
| 10 | 1 | 7 | Silvia Di Pietro | Italy | 24.77 | |
| 11 | 1 | 2 | Lillian Slušná | Slovakia | 24.80 | |
| 12 | 1 | 8 | Kalia Antoniou | Cyprus | 24.82 | |
| 13 | 1 | 1 | Julianna Dora Bocska | Germany | 24.83 | |
| 14 | 2 | 7 | Theodora Taylor | Great Britain | 24.86 | |
| 15 | 2 | 8 | Analia Pigrée | France | 24.92 | |
| 16 | 2 | 1 | Florine Gaspard | Belgium | 25.16 | |

=== Final ===
The final was held on 15 August at 18:37.

| Rank | Lane | Name | Nationality | Time | Notes |
|---|---|---|---|---|---|
| 1st place, gold medalist(s) | 3 | Katarzyna Wasick | Poland | 23.84 | NR |
| 2nd place, silver medalist(s) | 4 | Sarah Sjöström | Sweden | 23.86 | |
| 3rd place, bronze medalist(s) | 6 | Sara Curtis | Italy | 23.99 | NR |
| 4 | 5 | Milou van Wijk | Netherlands | 24.09 | |
| 5 | 2 | Marrit Steenbergen | Netherlands | 24.18 | |
| 6 | 8 | Neža Klančar | Slovenia | 24.56 | |
| 7 | 1 | Arina Surkova | Neutral Athletes B | 24.59 | |
| 8 | 7 | Béryl Gastaldello | France | 24.73 | |
