= Eszter Békési =

Hungarian swimmer

Personal information
- Full name: Eszter Dóra Békési
- Nationality: Hungary
- Born: 19 January 2002 (age 24) Debrecen, Hungary

Sport
- Sport: Swimming
Medal record
Women's swimming
Representing Hungary
European Championships (LC)
Bronze medal – third place	2024 Belgrade	4 × 100 m mixed medley

Eszter Dóra Békési (born 19 January 2002) is a Hungarian swimmer. She competed in the 2020 Summer Olympics.
