= Alexandra Schegoleva =

Cypriot swimmer (born 2001)

Personal information
- Born: 6 July 2001 (age 25)

Sport
- Sport: Swimming

Alexandra Schegoleva (born 6 July 2001) is a Cypriot swimmer. She competed in the women's 200 metre breaststroke event at the 2017 World Aquatics Championships. In 2019, she won three silver medals at the 2019 Games of the Small States of Europe held in Budva, Montenegro.
