= Cyprus Swimming Federation =

Sports governing body in Cyprus

Cyprus Swimming Federation Κυπριακή Ομοσπονδία Κολύμβησης
- Sport: Water polo, swimming, diving, open water swimming
- Abbreviation: (ΚΟΕK)
- Founded: 1972
- Affiliation: International Swimming Federation (FINA); European Swimming League (LEN)
- Location: Nicosia, Cyprus
- President: Alexandros Christoforou

Official website
- koek.org.cy

The Cyprus Swimming Federation (Greek: Κυπριακή Ομοσπονδία Κολύμβησης) founded in 1972, is the aquatics national federation for Cyprus. It oversees competition in 4 Olympic aquatic sports (water polo, swimming, diving and open water swimming).

It is affiliated to:

- FINA, the International Swimming Federation
- LEN, the European Swimming League
- COC, the Cyprus Olympic Committee.

== See also ==
- List of Cypriot records in swimming
