= Cyprus at the 2011 World Aquatics Championships =

Sporting event delegation

Flag of Cyprus

Cyprus competed at the 2011 World Aquatics Championships in Shanghai, China between July 16 and 31, 2011.

== Swimming ==
Cyprus qualified 3 swimmers.

Men

Athlete	Event	Heats		Semifinals		Final	
Athlete	Event	Time	Rank	Time	Rank	Time	Rank
Iacovos Hadjiconstantinou	Men's 400m Freestyle	4:13.53	43			did not advance	
Iacovos Hadjiconstantinou	Men's 800m Freestyle	8:38.93	49			did not advance	
Iacovos Hadjiconstantinou	Men's 1500m Freestyle	17:02.94	26			did not advance	

Women

Athlete	Event	Heats		Semifinals		Final	
Athlete	Event	Time	Rank	Time	Rank	Time	Rank
Anna Stylianou	Women's 200m Freestyle	2:01.62	33	did not advance			
Anna Stylianou	Women's 400m Freestyle	4:15.46	21			did not advance	
Anastasia Christoforou	Women's 50m Breaststroke	32.69	22	did not advance			
Anastasia Christoforou	Women's 100m Breaststroke	1:13.15	34	did not advance			
