= Flag of Cyprus =

Republic of Cyprus
- Use: National flag and ensign
- Proportion: 2∶3
- Adopted: 16 August 1960; 66 years ago (original design); 24 April 2006; 20 years ago (current version)
- Design: An outline of Cyprus in copper above two green olive branches on a white field
- Designed by: İsmet Güney

The flag of Cyprus (Greek: Σημαία της Κύπρου, romanized: Simaía tis Kýprou; Turkish: Kıbrıs bayrağı) came into use on 16 August 1960, under the Zürich and London Agreements, whereby a constitution was drafted and Cyprus was proclaimed an independent state. The flag was designed by Turkish Cypriot artist İsmet Güney. The design of the flag deliberately employs peaceful and neutral symbols in an attempt to indicate harmony between the Greek and Turkish Cypriot communities, an ideal that has not yet been realised. In 1963, Greek Cypriot and Turkish Cypriot communities separated because of Cypriot intercommunal violence.

The national flag features the shape of the map, with two olive branches below (a symbol of peace between the island's two communities) on white (another symbol of peace). The olive branches signify peace between the Greek and Turkish Cypriots. The map on the flag is a copper-orange colour, symbolising the large deposits of copper ore on the island, from which it may have received its name.

== Creation ==
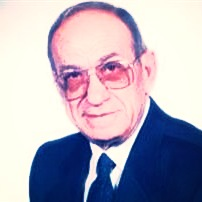
The artist İsmet Güney designed the modern flag of Cyprus in 1960.

The flag of the Republic of Cyprus was preceded by the flag of British Cyprus. Upon independence, Cyprus adopted a new flag. Under Article 4 of the constitution, the flag should be chosen jointly by the President and Vice-President and should "have a neutral design and colour," i.e. it should not include either blue or red colours (the colours of the flag of Greece and the flag of Turkey), nor portray a cross or a crescent.

The original proposal, made by the former British colonial administration, featured a rust-brown K on a white field. It was rejected by the President Makarios III and Vice-president Fazil Küçük, who preferred a flag proposed by İsmet Güney, a Turkish Cypriot artist.

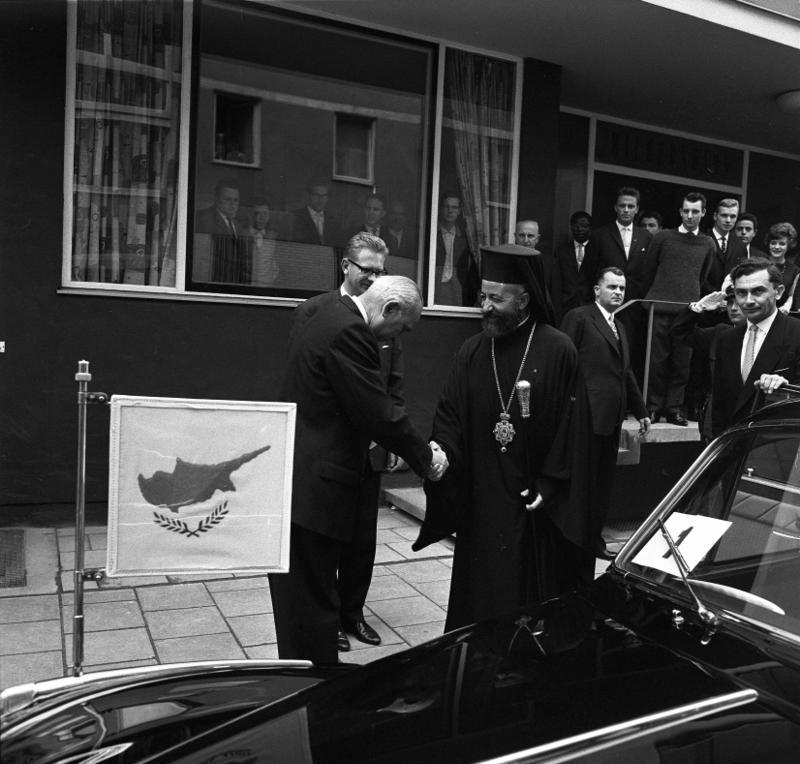
Makarios III with the flag on a visit to Munich, 1962

In the design of August 1960, the colour of the map is copper (Pantone 144-C). Both the crest and the two olive-tree leaves are olive green (Pantone 336-C). The background is white with the 3:5 ratio. In April 2006 the design was updated, the shape of the olive branches were slightly altered, its color was changed to Pantone 574, the copper color of the map was changed to Pantone 1385 and the ratio was changed to 3:2.

Flags produced on Cyprus often differ from the original specifications, both regarding the size of the map and the colours used. The government announced in October 2005, that it would take steps to "start from scratch" and assure that only flags complying with the official specifications would be produced.

Under the constitution of Cyprus, the flag of Cyprus may be flown by state institutions, public corporations, and citizens of the country.

== Colours ==
Colour scheme	Orange	Olive green	White
RGB	213-120-0	78-91-49	255-255-255
CMYK	0-44-100-16	14-0-46-64	0-0-0-0
Web colors	D57800	4E5B31	FFFFFF

== Flags ==
Flag of the Kingdom of Cyprus (15th century)

First flag of Cyprus under British colonial rule (1881–1922)

Last flag of Cyprus under British colonial rule (1922–1960)

Version of the flag used in 1960.

Version of the flag used from 16 August 1960 to 24 April 2006.

Version of the flag used since 24 April 2006.

Presidential standard of Cyprus

== Proposed national flag ==
Under the terms of the Annan Plan for Cyprus, a United Nations proposal to settle the Cyprus dispute, a new national flag would have been adopted by a reconstituted confederal republic of Cyprus. A competition was announced and the UN collected over 1000 proposals until 17 February 2003. Some of the proposals can be found on the webpage "Cyprus seeks new flag" by the BBC. It is possible that any future Cyprus settlement will include the adoption of a new flag.

In a referendum, the plan was accepted by Turkish Cypriots, but rejected by Greek Cypriots, therefore the plan was not put into place.

The British colonial administration's rejected proposal for the flag of independent Cyprus (1959).

One of the proposed flags of the United Republic of Cyprus.

== Use of the flags of Greece and Turkey ==
According to the constitution, the community authorities and their institutions have the right to hoist the Greek flag or the Turkish flag alongside the flag of Cyprus during the holidays. Any citizen may, without any restriction, fly the Greek or Turkish flag, or both, next to the flag of Cyprus. Other provisions also allow municipalities, educational institutions and the National Guard to do so as well. Since the de facto division of the island, consecutive to the 1974 invasion, the flag of Greece is the only flag of the two flown in the area under the jurisdiction of the Republic of Cyprus, due to the predominant presence of Greek-Cypriots in that part of the island. Similarly, the flag of Turkey is only observed in the area under the control of the Turkish Republic of Northern Cyprus (recognised only by Turkey).

Greek flag

Turkish flag

== See also ==
- List of Cypriot flags
- Flag of Northern Cyprus
- Coat of arms of Cyprus
- Hymn to Liberty
